= List of 2008 Primera División de Chile transfers =

This is a list of transfers that took place during the 2008 Primera División of Chile season.

== Apertura 2008 ==
=== Antofagasta ===
In:

- (Chile) Eric Pino from (Chile) Cobreloa
- (Paraguay) David Portillo from (Paraguay) Sportivo Trinidense
- (Paraguay) Juan Esteban Godoy from (Chile) Everton
- (Paraguay) Cristian Brítez from (Paraguay) Sol de América
- (Argentina) Mario Vargas from (Argentina) Brown
- (Paraguay) Rubén Darío Aguilera from (Bolivia) Real Potosi

Out:

- (Argentina) Sebastián Cobelli to (Chile) Santiago Morning
- (Chile) Patricio Aguilera to (Chile) Universidad Católica
- (Chile) Andrés Oroz to (Chile) Rangers
- (Argentina) Bruno Martelotto to (Chile) Ñublense
- (Chile) Israel Campillay Released
- (Chile) Giovanni Narváez to (Chile) San Marcos de Arica
- (Chile) Luis Alegría to (Chile) Ñublense
- (Chile) Alejandro Vásquez to (Chile) La Serena
- (Chile) Cristián Morán to (Chile) Ñublense

Manager in

- (Chile) Mario Véner

Manager out

- (Chile) Fernando Díaz

=== Audax Italiano ===
In

- (Chile) Manuel Ibarra from (Chile) Unión Española
- (Chile) Renzo Yáñez from (Chile) Huachipato
- (Chile) Sebastián Roco from (Mexico) Necaxa
- (Chile) Renato Ramos from (Mexico) Tecos B
- (Paraguay) Mario Villasanti from (Paraguay) Sportivo Luqueño
- (Uruguay) Marcelo Broli from (Uruguay) Montevideo Wanderers
- (Argentina) Lucas Suárez from (Uruguay) Tacuarembó
- (Chile) Mathias Vidangossy from (Spain) Villarreal (Loan)

Out

- (Argentina) Franco Di Santo to (England) Chelsea F.C.
- (Chile) Víctor Loyola to (Chile) Santiago Morning
- (Uruguay) Diego Scotti to (Argentina) Newell's Old Boys
- Juan González to Universidad de Chile
- (Chile) Nicolás Peric to (Turkey) Genclerbirligi
- (Uruguay) Leonardo Medina to (Colombia) Deportivo Pereira

=== Cobreloa ===
In

- (Paraguay) Elvis Marecos from (Bolivia) Club Bolívar
- (Chile) Luis Pedro Figueroa from (Argentina) Banfield
- (Uruguay) Iván Guillauma from (Chile) Cobresal
- (Argentina) Oscar Roberto Cornejo from (Colombia) Deportivo Cali
- (Chile) Rafael Celedón from (Chile) San Luis Quillota
- (Chile) Francisco Prieto from (Chile) Santiago Wanderers
- (Argentina) Rodrigo Mannara from (Chile) Deportes Puerto Montt (Loan return)
- (Paraguay) Fabián Benítez (Free agent)
- (Argentina) Gustavo Savoia from (Ecuador) Olmedo

Out

- (Chile) Esteban Paredes to (Chile) Santiago Morning (End of Loan)
- (Chile) Rodrigo Pérez to (Chile) Unión Española
- (Chile) Juan Luis González to (Chile) Everton
- (Chile) Felipe Flores to (Chile) Unión Española
- (Chile) Fernando Meneses to (Chile) Colo-Colo
- (Chile) Eric Pino to (Chile) Antofagasta
- (Chile) Jean Beausejour to (Chile) O'Higgins
- (Chile) Cristián Canío to (Chile) Everton
- (Chile) Leandro Delgado to (Chile) Everton
- (Argentina) Daniel Giménez to (Argentina) Chacarita Juniors
- (Chile) Carlos Alzamora to (Chile) La Serena
- (Chile) Luis Godoy to (Chile) Cobresal
- (Argentina) Cristian Ríos to (Chile) Cobresal

=== Cobresal ===
In

- (Chile) Oscár Fabián Ibarra from (Chile) Ñublense
- (Chile) Luis Flores Manzor from (Chile) O'Higgins
- (Argentina) Diego Guidi from (Chile) Everton
- (Chile) Fabián Alfaro from (Chile) Deportes Copiapó
- (Chile) Freddy Segura from (Chile) Universidad de Concepción
- (Chile) Marco Olea from (Chile) Everton
- (Argentina) Cristian Ríos from (Chile) Cobreloa
- (Chile) Pedro Muñoz from (Chile) Curicó Unido
- (Chile) Luis Godoy from (Chile) Cobreloa
- (Colombia) Carlos Perlaza from (Colombia) Atlético Huila

Out

- (Chile) Alejandro Blanco to (Chile) Santiago Morning
- (Chile) Gabriel Vargas to (Chile) Universidad de Concepción
- (Uruguay) Iván Guillauma to (Chile) Cobreloa
- (Chile) Cesar Diaz to (Chile) Deportes Melipilla

=== Colo-Colo ===
In

- (Argentina) Lucas Barrios from (Mexico) Atlas (On Loan)
- (Chile) Ricardo Rojas from (Mexico) América
- (Chile) Daniel González from (Chile) O'Higgins
- (Paraguay) José Domingo Salcedo from (Argentina) Racing Club de Avellaneda
- (Chile) Cristobal Jorquera from (Chile) Unión Española (Loan return)
- (Chile) Fernando Meneses from (Chile) Cobreloa (Loan return)
- (Chile) Raúl Olivares from (Chile) Santiago Morning (Loan return)
- (Chile) José Pedro Fuenzalida from (Chile) Universidad Católica
- (Colombia) John Jairo Castillo from (Venezuela) Guaros FC
- (Colombia) Carlos Eduardo Salazar from (Colombia) Deportes Tolima

Out

- (Colombia) Giovanni Hernandez to (Colombia) Atlético Junior
- (Chile) David Henriquez to (Mexico) Dorados de Sinaloa
- (Chile) Miguel Aceval to (Uruguay) Defensor Sporting
- (Chile) Rodrigo Millar to (Colombia) Once Caldas
- (Argentina) Claudio Bieler to (Ecuador) LDU Quito
- (Chile) Boris González to (Chile) Universidad Católica
- (Chile) Richard Leyton to (Chile) Puerto Montt (Loaned)
- (Chile) Ariel Salinas to (Chile) Unión San Felipe (Loaned)
- (Chile) Juan Pablo Arenas to (Chile) Deportes Melipilla (Loaned)

=== Deportes Concepción ===
In

- (Uruguay) Daniel Pereira from (Chile) O'Higgins
- (Chile) Juan José Ribera from (Chile) Universidad de Concepción
- (Chile) José Soto from (Chile) Santiago Wanderers
- (Paraguay) Nestor Bareiro from (Paraguay) 12 de Octubre
- (Chile) Jaime Rubilar from (Chile) Everton
- (Chile) Horacio del Valle from (Chile) Huachipato
- (Chile) César Reyes from (Chile) Colo-Colo
- (Argentina) Leonardo Díaz from (Argentina) Huracán
- (Argentina) Gabriel Marra from (Argentina) San Telmo
- (Chile) Alvaro Lara from (Chile) Universidad Católica
- (Chile) Carlos Escudero from (Chile) Deportes Copiapó

Out

- (Paraguay) Jaison Ibarrola to (Chile) Universidad de Concepción
- (Chile) Leonardo Monje to (Chile) Huachipato
- (Chile) Erwin Concha to (Chile) Lota Schwager
- (Argentina) Raul Sanzotti to (Argentina) Defensores de Belgrano
- (Paraguay) Héctor Benítez to (Paraguay) Olimpia
- (Chile) Clarence Acuña to (Chile) Unión Española
- (Chile) Alejandro Osorio to (Chile) Ñublense
- (Chile) Luis Chavarría to (Chile) Fernandez Vial
- (Chile) Sebastián Montecinos to (Chile) San Marcos de Arica

=== Everton ===
In

- (Chile) Jaime Riveros from (Chile) Huachipato
- (Chile) Mauricio Arias from (Chile) Huachipato
- (Chile) Claudio Núñez from (Mexico) Tigres los Mochis
- (Chile) Cristián Oviedo from (Chile) Lota Schwager
- (Chile) Leandro Delgado from (Chile) Cobreloa
- (Chile) Roberto Silva from (Chile) Lota Schwager
- Ángel Rojas from Universidad de Chile
- (Chile) Cristián Canío from (Chile) Cobreloa
- (Uruguay) Gustavo Tejería from (Uruguay) Cerro Largo
- (Chile) Juan Luis González from (Chile) Cobreloa
- (Chile) Fernando Saavedra from (Chile) La Serena
- (Argentina) Ezequiel Miralles from (Argentina) Talleres de Córdoba
- (Chile) Adrián Rojas from (Chile) O'Higgins

Out

- (Argentina) Matías Urbano to (Chile) Cúcuta Deportivo
- (Chile) Alejandro Escalona Unattached
- (Chile) Marco Olea to (Chile) Cobresal
- (Chile) Camilo Rozas Unattached
- (Chile) Jaime Rubilar to (Chile) Deportes Concepción
- (Argentina) Patricio Pérez to (Argentina) San Martín de Tucumán
- (Chile) Joel Reyes to (Chile) Ñublense
- (Paraguay) Juan Esteban Godoy to (Chile) Antofagasta
- (Chile) Samuel Teuber to (Chile) Provincial Osorno
- (Argentina) Diego Guidi to (Chile) La Serena
- (Chile) Michael Barrientos to (Chile) Fernandez Vial
- (Chile) Felipe Soto Unattached

=== Huachipato ===
In

- (Paraguay) Henry Lapczyk from (Paraguay) Olimpia
- (Chile) Leonardo Monje from (Chile) Deportes Concepción
- (Paraguay) José Carlos Burgos from (Paraguay) 12 de Octubre
- (Argentina) Gustavo Semino from (Argentina) Gimnasia y Esgrima de La Plata
- (Chile) Hernán Madrid from (Chile) Antofagasta
- (Chile) Victor Hugo Sarabia from (Chile) Lota Schwager
- (Chile) Roberto Cartes from (Chile) Deportes Concepción
- (Chile) Gamadiel García from (Greece) Skoda Xanthi
- (Chile) César Cortés from (Spain) Albacete Balompié
- (Argentina) Sebastian Matos from (Argentina) Chacarita Juniors

Out

- (Argentina) Leonardo Mas to Universidad de Chile
- José Contreras to Universidad de Chile
- (Argentina) Diego Ruiz to (Romania) CFR Cluj
- (Chile) Jaime Riveros to (Chile) Everton
- (Chile) Cristian Leiva to (Chile) Antofagasta
- (Chile) Mauricio Arias to (Chile) Everton
- (Chile) Renzo Yáñez to (Chile) Audax Italiano

=== La Serena ===
In:

- (Argentina) Martín Gianfelice from (Argentina) Comunicaciones
- (Chile) Roberto Castillo from (Chile) Antofagasta
- (Argentina) Jonathan Domínguez from (Argentina) San Lorenzo
- Yerson Opazo from Universidad de Chile

Out:

- (Chile) Fernando Saavedra from (Chile) Everton
- (Chile) Patricio Rubina from (Chile) Universidad de Concepción

=== Melipilla ===
In

- (Argentina) Norberto Arrieta from (Argentina) Almirante Brown
- (Chile) Hector Barra from (Chile) O'Higgins
- (Chile) Luis Oyarzún from (Chile) Coquimbo Unido
- (Chile) César Díaz from (Chile) Cobresal
- (Chile) Iván Alvarez from (Chile) Puerto Montt
- (Chile) Carlos Espinosa from (Sweden) Örgryte IS
- (Chile) Vladimir Hererra from (Chile) Lota Schwager

Out

- (Argentina) Héctor Pericás to (Chile) Palestino
- (Chile) César Henríquez to (Colombia) América de Cali
- (Uruguay) Román Cuello to (Uzbekistan) Inter Baku
- (Bolivia) José Carlo Fernández to (Bolivia) Blomming
- (Chile) Diego de Gregorio to (Romania) CS Pandurii Târgu Jiu
- (Uruguay) Carlos de Castro to (Uruguay) Miramar Misiones

=== Ñublense ===
In

- (Paraguay) Ever Cantero from (Chile) Palestino
- (Chile) Alejandro Osorio from (Chile) Deportes Concepción
- (Chile) Alexis Norambuena from (Chile) Unión Española
- (Chile) Luis Alegría from (Chile) Antofagasta
- (Chile) Fernando Lopéz from (Chile) O'Higgins
- (Chile) Juan Pablo Toro from (Chile) Universidad de Concepción
- (Chile) César Bravo from (India) PSPS Pekanbaru
- (Argentina) Bruno Martelotto from (Chile) Antofagasta
- (Chile) Jaime Bravo from (Chile) Unión Española
- (Chile) Jonathan Cisternas from (Chile) Coquimbo Unido
- (Chile) Cristián Morán from (Chile) Antofagasta
- (Chile) Mauricio Cataldo from (Chile) Lota Schwager
- (Chile) Pedro Rivera from (Chile) Coquimbo Unido

Out

- (United States) Chase Hilgenbrinck to (United States) New England Revolution
- Manuel Villalobos to Universidad de Chile
- (Chile) Oscar Fabián Ibarra to (Chile) Cobresal
- (Chile) Carlos Cisternas to (Chile) Universidad de Concepción
- (Chile) Marcos Millape to (Chile) Universidad de Concepción
- (Paraguay) Danilo Aceval to (Chile) Deportes Concepción
- (Chile) Luis Jara to (Chile) Universidad Católica

=== O'Higgins ===
In

Out

=== Palestino ===
In

Out

=== Provincial Osorno ===
In

Out

=== Rangers ===
In

Out

=== Santiago Morning ===
In

Out

=== Unión Española ===
In

Out

=== Universidad Católica ===
In

Out

=== Universidad de Chile ===
In

- (Chile) Manuel Villalobos from (Chile) Ñublense
- (Argentina) Walter Montillo from (Argentina) San Lorenzo
- (Argentina) Raúl Estévez from (Portugal) Academica de Coimbra
- (Argentina) Leonardo Mas from (Chile) Huachipato
- (Chile) José Contreras from (Chile) Huachipato
- (Chile) Juan González from (Chile) Audax Italiano

Out

- (Chile) Waldo Ponce to (Argentina) Velez Sarsfield
- (Chile) Yerson Opazo to (Chile) La Serena
- (Chile) Sebastián Pinto to (Brazil) Santos
- (Chile) Ángel Rojas to (Chile) Everton
- (Uruguay) Javier Delgado to (Colombia) Deportivo Cali
- (Chile) Patricio Galaz Released
- (Chile) Francisco Arrué to (Colombia) Atlético Nacional
- (Chile) Robin Melo to (Chile) Unión La Calera
- (Chile) Miguel Coronado to (Chile) Unión La Calera
- (Chile) Joel Soto to (Chile) Santiago Wanderers

=== Universidad de Concepción ===
In

Out

== Clausura 2008 ==
=== Antofagasta ===
In

- (Chile) Gerson Acevedo from (Chile) Colo-Colo (On Loan)
- (Uruguay) Julio Pablo Rodríguez from (Cyprus) Alki Larnaca FC
- (Chile) César Reyes from (Chile) Colo-Colo (On Loan)
- (Chile) Omar Riquelme from (Chile) Unión Española
- (Chile) Rubén Bascuñán from (Chile) Unión Española
- (Peru) Juan Pablo Farfán from (Peru) Alianza Lima
- (Uruguay) Federico Martinez from (Argentina) Rosario Central
- (Paraguay) Nestor Isasi from (Peru) Alianza Lima

Out

- (Argentina) Mario Daniel Vargas Released
- (Paraguay) Juan Esteban Godoy to (Paraguay) Silvio Pettirossi
- (Chile) Héctor Suazo to (Chile) San Luis Quillota
- (Chile) Cristian Leiva to (Chile) Unión San Felipe
- (Chile) Eduardo Arancibia to (Chile) Santiago Morning
- (Chile) Patricio Aguilera to (Chile) Universidad Católica (Loan return)
- (Paraguay) Rubén Darío Aguilera to (Paraguay) Silvio Pettirossi

=== Audax Italiano ===
In

- (Chile) Johnny Herrera from (Chile) Everton
- Juan González from Universidad de Chile (On Loan)
- (Chile) Omar Enrique Mallea from (Chile) Rangers de Talca
- (Argentina) Rubén Darío Gigena from (Paraguay) Sportivo Luqueño
- (Chile) Fernando Gutiérrez from (Chile) Unión Española (loan return)
- (Chile) Mauricio Salazar from (Chile) La Serena

Out

- (Chile) Mathias Vidangossy to (Chile) CD Everton
- (Chile) Sebastián Roco to (Argentina) Gimnasia y Esgrima de Jujuy
- (Chile) Nicolás Corvetto to (Italy) Udinese Calcio
- (Chile) Carlos Villanueva to (England) Blackburn Rovers (Loaned)

=== Cobreloa ===
In

- (Chile) Paolo Vivar (Free agent)
- (Chile) Felipe Salinas from (Chile) San Luis Quillota
- (Chile) Paulo Magalhaes from (Chile) Antofagasta
- (Chile) Alonso Zúñiga from (Chile) Deportes Concepción
- (Chile) Daniel González from (Chile) Colo-Colo (loan)

Out:

- (Paraguay) Elvis Marecos to (Paraguay) Club Guarani
- (Chile) Rodrigo Viligron to (Chile) Provincial Osorno
- (Chile) Luis Pedro Figueroa to (Chile) Cobreloa
- (Chile) Rodrigo Rain to (Chile) Coquimbo Unido

=== Cobresal ===
In

Out

- (Argentina) Julio César Laffatigue to (Chile) Universidad de Concepción
- (Argentina) Juan Manuel Lucero to (Paraguay) Club Olimpia

=== Colo-Colo ===
In

- (Colombia) Macnelly Torres from (Colombia) Cúcuta Deportivo
- (Chile) Daud Gazale from (Chile) Deportes Concepción
- (Chile) Gerardo Cortés from (Chile) Deportes Concepción
- (Chile) Juan Gonzalo Lorca from (Netherlands) Vitesse Arnhem
- (Chile) Luis Pedro Figueroa from (Chile) Cobreloa
- (Chile) Rodrigo Millar from (Colombia) Once Caldas

Out

- (Chile) José Luis Cabión to (Chile) Everton
- (Colombia) John Jairo Castillo to (Chile) Everton
- (Chile) Eduardo Rubio to (Switzerland) FC Basel
- (Colombia) Carlos Eduardo Salazar to (Colombia) Deportivo Pereira
- (Chile) Gerardo Cortés from (Chile) Deportes Concepción
- (Uruguay) Gustavo Biscayzacu to (Mexico) Club Necaxa
- (Chile) José Pedro Fuenzalida to (Chile) O'Higgins
- (Chile) Rafael Caroca to (Chile) O'Higgins
- (Chile) Daniel González to (Chile) Cobreloa (loan)
- (Chile) Fernando Meneses to (Chile) Universidad de Concepción (loan)
- (Chile) Boris Sagredo to (Chile) Palestino (loan)
- (Chile) Gonzalo Fierro to (Brazil) Flamengo

=== Deportes Concepción ===
In

Out

- (Argentina) Leonardo Díaz (Argentina) Boca Unidos
- (Argentina) Gabriel Marra Released
- (Uruguay) Daniel Pereira to (Chile) Universidad de Concepción
- (Chile) Juan José Ribera to (Chile) Ñublense
- (Paraguay) Nestor Bareiro to (Chile) O'Higgins
- (Chile) Francisco Castillo to (Chile) Unión Española
- (Chile) César Vergara to (Chile) Unión Española
- (Chile) Gerardo Cortés to (Chile) Unión Española

=== Everton ===
In

- (Chile) Paulo Garcés from (Chile) Universidad Católica (On Loan)
- (Chile) José Luis Cabión from (Chile) Colo-Colo
- (Colombia) John Jairo Castillo from (Chile) Colo-Colo
- (Chile) Mathias Vidangossy from (Chile) Audax Italiano (On loan from Villarreal)
- (Uruguay) Jesús Toscanini from (Uruguay) Miramar Misiones
- (Argentina) Sebastián Tagliabué from (Argentina) Club Atlético Colegiales

Out

- (Chile) Claudio Núñez Retired
- (Chile) Johnny Herrera to (Chile) Audax Italiano
- (Argentina) Javier Menghini to (Cyprus) Enosis Neon Paralimni FC
- (Uruguay) Gustavo Tejería to (Uruguay) Atenas de San Carlos
- (Argentina) Darío Gigena to (Argentina) Nueva Chicago

=== Huachipato ===
In

- (Chile) Miguel Aceval from (Uruguay) Defensor Sporting
- (Chile) Patricio Ormazabal from (Chile) Universidad Católica
- (Chile) Mauricio Zenteno from (Chile) Universidad Católica (On Loan)

Out

- (Chile) David Cid to (Chile) Unión Temuco
- (Argentina) Sebastian Matos to (Argentina) Atlanta FC
- (Chile) Carlos Rivera to (Chile) Deportes Temuco
- (Paraguay) Herminio Miranda to (Paraguay) Club Nacional
- (Argentina) Gustavo Semino to (Chile) Unión La Calera

=== La Serena ===
In

- (Argentina) Gustavo Canales from (Colombia) Once Caldas
- (Chile) Patricio Rubina from (Chile) Universidad de Concepción
- (Chile) Pablo Bolados from (Chile) Cobreloa
- (Chile) Carlos Alzamora from (Chile) Cobreloa
- (Paraguay) Luis Peña from (Chile) Unión San Felipe
- (Chile) Alejandro Vázquez (Free agent)

Out

- (Chile) Mauricio Salazar to (Chile) Audax Italiano

=== Melipilla ===
In

- (Colombia) Javier Dussan from (Colombia) Academia FC
- (Chile) Juan Pablo Arenas from (Chile) Colo-Colo
- (Argentina) Juan Cruz Gill from (Argentina) Talleres de Córdoba
- (Argentina) Franco Arias from (Argentina) Quilmes AC
- (Argentina) Ricardo Hernán Pagés (Free agent)

Out

- (Chile) Cristián Muñoz Corrales to (Peru) José Gálvez FBC
- (Chile) Hector Barra to (Chile) Curicó Unido
- (Chile) John Valladares to (Chile) San Luis Quillota
- (Chile) Alejandro Carrasco to (Chile) Palestino
- (Chile) Jaime García from (Chile) Lota Schwager

=== Ñublense ===
In

- (Chile) Patricio Galaz from (Colombia) Millonarios
- (Chile) Juan José Ribera from (Chile) Deportes Concepción
- (Chile) Fernando Martel from (Colombia) Atlético Nacional
- (Argentina) Matías Rojas from (Argentina) Villa Dalmine

Out

=== O'Higgins ===
In

- (Brazil) Aílton da Silva from (Chile) Universidad Católica
- (Paraguay) Nestor Bareiro from (Chile) Deportes Concepción
- (Chile) Jose Pedro Fuenzalida from (Chile) Colo-Colo (On Loan)
- (Chile) Rafael Caroca from (Chile) Colo-Colo (On Loan)
- (Chile) Ali Manouchehri from (Chile) Antofagasta
- (Chile) Jean Beausejour from (Mexico) América (On Loan)

Out

- (Chile) Felipe Flores Quijada to (Chile) Coquimbo Unido
- (Chile) Roberto Cáceres to (Chile) Lobos de la BUAP
- (Chile) Jean Beausejour to (Mexico) América
- (Chile) Carlos Carmona to (Italy) Reggina

=== Palestino ===
In

- (Panama) Ernesto Sinclair from (Argentina) Estudiantes de La Plata
- (Chile) Alejandro Carrasco from (Chile) Deportes Melipilla
- (Chile) Boris Sagredo from (Chile) Colo-Colo (On Loan)

Out

- (Argentina) Juan Carlos Maldonado to (Chile) Coquimbo Unido
- (Chile) Juan Pablo Úbeda to (Mexico) Lobos de la BUAP

=== Provincial Osorno ===
In

- (Chile) Marcos Millape from (Chile) Universidad de Concepción
- (Chile) Ricardo Parada from (Mexico) Lobos de la BUAP
- (Chile) Claudio Muñoz from (Venezuela) UA Maracaibo
- (Argentina) Santiago Gentiletti from (Argentina) Gimnasia y Esgrima de La Plata (On Loan)
- (Chile) Rodrigo Viligrón from (Chile) Cobreloa

Out

- (Uruguay) Diego Casamán to (Uruguay) Villa Española
- (Chile) Michael Silva to (Mexico) Potros Chetumal
- (Chile) Gonzalo Sepulveda to (Chile) Universidad Católica (End of Loan)
- (Argentina) José Pablo Burtovoy to (Bolivia) Jorge Wilstermann
- (Chile) Emerson Ayala to (Chile) Deportes Temuco
- (Argentina) Héctor Federico Carballo to (Paraguay) Guaraní
- (Argentina) Fernando Brandán Released
- (Argentina) Fabián Caballero to (Greece) Panachaiki

=== Rangers ===
In

- (Argentina) Juan Manuel Cavallo from (Argentina) Tiro Federal
- (Chile) Marcelo Soto from (Chile) Magallanes
- (Paraguay) Jorge Aquino from (Chile) Curicó Unido
- (Chile) Matías Lavanderos from (Chile) Linares CF

Out

- (Chile) Lucas Palma to (Chile) Municipal Iquique
- (Paraguay) Derlis Ortellado to (Chile) Municipal Iquique
- (Argentina) Omar Enrique Mallea to (Chile) Audax Italiano
- (Argentina) Nahuel Jiménez to (Argentina) Platense

=== Santiago Morning ===
In

- (Argentina) Diego Rivarola from (Cyprus) Alki Larnaca
- (Argentina) Carlos Javier Netto from (Argentina) Gimnasia y Esgrima
- (Chile) Jaime Grondona from (Chile) Santiago Wanderers
- (Chile) Eduardo Arancibia from (Chile) Antofagasta
- (Chile) Eduardo Dumas from (Chile) Unión San Felipe

Out

- (Chile) José Catalan to (Argentina) San Luis Quillota
- (Chile) Miguel Catalán Released
- (Chile) Luis Valenzuela to (Chile) Deportes Temuco
- (Argentina) Sebastián Cobelli to (Argentina) Talleres de Córdoba
- (Chile) Juan Ramón Orellana to (Chile) Unión La Calera
- (Chile) Juan Pablo Arenas to (Chile) Deportes Melipilla
- (Chile) Marco Moscoso to (Chile) San Marcos de Arica
- (Chile) Wladimir Lopéz Released
- (Chile) Sergio Cáceres Released
- (Chile) Fernando Abarca Released

=== Unión Española ===
In

- (Chile) Gerardo Cortés from (Chile) Colo-Colo (On Loan)
- (Argentina) Angel Vildozo from (Guatemala) CSD Comunicaciones
- (Paraguay) Héctor Joel Pérez from (Paraguay) Silvio Pettirossi
- (Paraguay) Nelson López from (Paraguay) Silvio Pettirossi
- (Chile) Jaime Rubilar from (Chile) Deportes Concepción
- (Chile) César Vergara from (Chile) Deportes Concepción
- (Chile) Francisco Castillo from (Chile) Deportes Concepción
- (Argentina) Anibal Domeneghini from (Chile) Unión San Felipe

Out

- (Argentina) Osvaldo Barsottini to (Argentina) C.A.I
- (Chile) Mario Cáceres to (Switzerland) FC St Gallen
- (Chile) Cristián Sepulveda to (Chile) Municipal Iquique (Loaned)
- (Chile) Omar Riquelme to (Chile) Antofagasta
- (Chile) Ruben Bascuñán to (Chile) Antofagasta
- (Chile) Fernando Gutiérrez to (Chile) Audax Italiano (End of Loan)

=== Universidad Católica ===
In

- (Chile) Gonzalo Sepúlveda from (Chile) Provincial Osorno (Loan Return)
- (Chile) Patricio Aguilera from (Chile) Antofagasta (Loan Return)
- (Paraguay) Jaison Ibarrola from (Chile) Universidad de Concepción
- (Argentina) Nicolás Gianni from (Argentina) Argentinos Juniors (On loan)
- (Chile) Milovan Mirosevic from (Argentina) Argentinos Juniors
- (Argentina) Jeremias Caggiano from (Spain) Albacete Balompié

Out

- (Argentina) Darío Bottinelli to (Mexico) Atlas
- (Chile) Mauricio Zenteno to (Chile) Huachipato (Loaned)
- (Chile) Patricio Ormazabal to (Chile) Huachipato
- (Chile) Roberto Gutiérrez to (Mexico) Tecos
- (Chile) Nicolás Núñez to (Spain) Albacete Balompié (End of Loan)
- (Chile) Hector Tapia Released
- (Chile) Carlos Arías to (Chile) Provincial Osorno
- (Brazil) Aílton da Silva to (Chile) O'Higgins

=== Universidad de Chile ===
In

- (Chile) Osvaldo González from (Chile) Universidad de Concepción
- (Chile) Sebastián Pardo from (Netherlands) Excelsior Rotterdam
- (Chile) Nelson Pinto from (Mexico) UAG Tecos (On Loan)
- (Argentina) Cristián Milla from (Argentina) Chacarita Juniors

Out

- (Chile) Juan González to (Chile) Audax Italiano
- (Chile) Pedro Morales to (Serbia) Dinamo Zagreb
- (Chile) Eduardo Navea to (Chile) Santiago Wanderers
- (Chile) Cristobal López to (Chile) Santiago Wanderers

=== Universidad de Concepción ===
In

- (Argentina) Julio César Laffatigue from (Chile) Cobresal
- (Chile) Fernando Meneses from (Chile) Colo-Colo (On Loan)
- (Uruguay) Daniel Pereira from (Chile) Deportes Concepción
- (Argentina) Carlos Zorrilla from (Paraguay) 12 de Octubre

Out

- (Paraguay) Jaison Ibarrola to (Chile) Universidad Católica
- Osvaldo González to Universidad de Chile
- (Chile) Marcos Millape to (Chile) Provincial Osorno
- (Chile) Carlos Cisternas to (Chile) Puerto Montt
- (Chile) Hugo Bascuñán to (Chile) Santiago Wanderers
- (Chile) Patricio Rubina to (Chile) La Serena
- (Chile) Hector Tapia Vega Released
- (Chile) Iván Valenzuela Released
