= 2008 Campeonato Nacional Primera División =

Primera División
- Season: 2008
- Champions: Apertura: Everton (4th title); Clausura: Colo-Colo (28th title)
- Relegated: Antofagasta; Concepción; Melipilla; Provincial Osorno
- Copa Libertadores: Everton; Colo-Colo; Universidad de Chile
- Copa Sudamericana: Ñublense; Universidad Católica
- Top goalscorer: Apertura: Lucas Barrios (19 goals); Clausura: Lucas Barrios (18 goals); Season: Lucas Barrios (37 goals)

The 2008 Primera División de Chile is the 77th season of top-flight football in Chile, and the 7th under its current format.

== Torneo Apertura ==
The Torneo Apertura "Copa BancoEstado" opened the 2008 season on January 25. The 20 teams were organized into four groups, but played each other in a single round-robin format. The top-two teams from each group advanced to a single elimination play-off, but the best 3rd-place team had to worst 2nd-place team in an advancement play-off match. The winner of the tournament will be crowned the Apertura champion, and will earn a spot in the 2009 Copa Libertadores Group Stage. The champion and runner-up with earn spots in the 2008 Copa Sudamericana.

=== First phase ===
Pos	Team	Pld	W	D	L	GF	GA	GD	Pts	Qualification
1	Ñublense	19	12	5	2	28	14	+14	41	2008 Copa Sudamericana First Stage
2	Universidad Católica	19	11	3	5	37	19	+18	36	2008 Copa Sudamericana Preliminary
3	O'Higgins	19	10	6	3	30	17	+13	36	
4	Audax Italiano	19	11	1	7	35	25	+10	34	
5	Everton	19	10	2	7	34	30	+4	32	
6	Cobresal	19	9	4	6	35	26	+9	31	
7	Universidad de Chile	19	9	3	7	28	23	+5	30	
8	Santiago Morning	19	9	3	7	35	42	−7	30	
9	Colo-Colo	19	7	6	6	35	29	+6	27	
10	Huachipato	19	7	6	6	29	29	0	27	
11	Deportes La Serena	19	7	5	7	29	29	0	26	
12	Palestino	19	7	3	9	28	27	+1	24	
13	Unión Española	19	7	3	9	20	27	−7	24	
14	Rangers	19	6	6	7	23	25	−2	24	
15	Cobreloa	19	6	5	8	25	29	−4	23	
16	Universidad de Concepción	19	6	3	10	27	33	−6	21	
17	Deportes Antofagasta	19	4	5	10	16	29	−13	17	
18	Provincial Osorno	19	5	1	13	19	38	−19	16	
19	Deportes Concepción	19	7	3	9	33	37	−4	15 (Note: Deportes Concepción were docked nine points for using ineligible players in Round 2.)	
20	Deportes Melipilla	19	3	1	15	22	40	−18	10	

Updated to match(es) played on May 4, 2008. Source: RSSSF
Rules for classification: 1) points; 2) goal difference; 3) number of goals scored.

=== Group standings ===
Group 1
Pos	Team	Pld	W	D	L	GF	GA	GD	Pts	Qualification
1	Audax Italiano	19	11	1	7	35	25	+10	34	Playoffs
2	Everton	19	10	2	7	34	30	+4	32	Playoffs
3	Cobresal	19	9	4	6	29	29	0	31	Play-off Match
4	Huachipato	19	7	6	6	29	29	0	27	
5	Unión Española	19	7	3	9	20	27	−7	24	

Group 2
Pos	Team	Pld	W	D	L	GF	GA	GD	Pts	Qualification
1	O'Higgins	19	10	6	3	30	17	+13	36	Playoffs
2	Universidad de Chile	19	9	3	7	28	23	+5	30	Playoffs
3	Santiago Morning	19	9	3	7	36	44	−8	30	
4	Deportes La Serena	19	7	5	7	29	29	0	26	
5	Palestino	19	7	3	9	28	27	+1	24	

Group 3
Pos	Team	Pld	W	D	L	GF	GA	GD	Pts	Qualification
1	Colo-Colo	19	7	6	6	35	29	+6	27	Playoffs
2	Cobreloa	19	6	5	8	25	29	−4	23	Play-off Match
3	Deportes Antofagasta	19	4	5	10	16	29	−13	17	
4	Provincial Osorno	19	5	1	13	19	28	−9	16	
5	Deportes Melipilla	19	3	1	15	22	40	−18	10	

Group 4
Pos	Team	Pld	W	D	L	GF	GA	GD	Pts	Qualification
1	Ñublense	19	12	5	2	29	13	+16	41	Playoffs
2	Universidad Católica	19	11	3	5	37	19	+18	36	Playoffs
3	Rangers	19	6	6	7	23	25	−2	24	
4	Universidad de Concepción	19	6	3	10	28	32	−4	21	
5	Deportes Concepción	19	7	3	9	35	38	−3	18 (Note: Deportes Concepción were docked six points for using ineligible players in Round 2.)	

Updated to match(es) played on May 4, 2008. Source: RSSSF
Rules for classification: 1) points; 2) goal difference; 3) number of goals scored.

=== Play-off match ===
Team 1	Score	Team 2
Cobresal	2–2 (2–4 p)	Cobreloa

=== Playoff stage ===
The clubs were seeded by their first phase standings.

Quarterfinals
5	Everton (a)	0	4	4
4	Audax Italiano	3	1	4
6	Universidad de Chile	4	2	6
3	O'Higgins	2	1	3
2	Universidad Católica	1	1	2
7	Colo-Colo	3	1	4
8	Cobreloa	2	1	3
1	Ñublense	2	2	4

Semifinals
5	Everton	3	1	4
6	Universidad de Chile	1	1	2
7	Colo-Colo(a)	0	2	2
1	Ñublense	1	1	2

Final
5	Everton	0	3	3
7	Colo-Colo	2	0	2

=== Finals ===
28 May 2008
20:10 (UTC-4)

Colo-Colo	2 – 0	Everton
Barrios 85'; Fierro 90+2'

Monumental David Arellano, Santiago
Attendance: 31,482
Referee: P. Pozo
3 June 2008
18:10 (UTC-4)

Everton	3 – 0	Colo-Colo
Miralles 49', 77'; Riveros 70'

Estadio Sausalito, Viña del Mar
Attendance: 19,000
Referee: R. Selman

Campeonato Nacional
2008 Apertura champion
Everton
4th title

Everton qualified to the 2009 Copa Libertadores Second Stage.

=== Top-five goalscorers ===
P	Scorer	Team	Goals
1	(Argentina) Lucas Barrios	Colo-Colo	19
2	(Chile) Esteban Paredes	Santiago Morning	15
3	(Chile) Manuel Villalobos	Universidad de Chile	13
3	(Argentina) Ezequiel Miralles	Everton	13
5	(Chile) Gabriel Vargas	Universidad de Concepción	12

== Torneo Clausura ==
The Torneo Clausura "Copa BancoEstado" began on June 21. The format is the same as the Apertura tournament, but the field was reduced from 20 teams to 19 since Deportes Concepción withdrew before the start of the tournament due to financial problems. The best-placed team in the first stage earned a spot in the First Stage of the 2009 Copa Libertadores. The tournament champion will earn a spot in the 2009 Copa Libertadores Group Stage. Relegation will be determined at the end of this tournament.

=== First phase ===
Pos	Team	Pld	W	D	L	GF	GA	GD	Pts	Qualification
1	Universidad de Chile	18	12	2	4	39	21	+18	38	2009 Copa Libertadores First Stage
2	Colo-Colo	18	10	3	5	32	19	+13	33	
3	Palestino	18	10	3	5	29	22	+7	33	
4	Rangers	18	9	3	6	25	25	0	30	
5	Universidad Católica	18	9	2	7	37	33	+4	29	
6	Everton	18	9	1	8	28	25	+3	28	
7	O'Higgins	18	8	4	6	39	35	+4	28	
8	Huachipato	18	8	3	7	33	25	+8	27	
9	Cobreloa	18	8	3	7	34	32	+2	27	
10	Deportes La Serena	18	7	6	5	37	34	+3	27	
11	Santiago Morning	18	7	5	6	30	32	−2	26	
12	Unión Española	18	7	4	7	27	31	−4	25	
13	Audax Italiano	18	6	6	6	25	25	0	24	
14	Deportes Antofagasta	18	7	2	9	20	27	−7	23	
15	Universidad de Concepción	18	5	6	7	32	32	0	21	
16	Cobresal	18	5	6	7	24	26	−2	21	
17	Ñublense	18	3	8	7	21	29	−8	17	
18	Deportes Melipilla	18	3	2	13	19	38	−19	11	
19	Provincial Osorno	18	3	1	14	20	40	−20	10	

Updated to match(es) played on November 9, 2008. Source: RSSSF
Rules for classification: 1) points; 2) goal difference; 3) number of goals scored.

=== Group standings ===
Group 1
Pos	Team	Pld	W	D	L	GF	GA	GD	Pts	Qualification
1	Universidad de Chile	18	12	2	4	39	21	+18	38	Playoffs
2	Colo-Colo	18	10	3	5	32	19	+13	33	Playoffs
3	Unión Española	18	7	4	7	28	32	−4	25	
4	Ñublense	18	3	8	7	21	29	−8	17	

Group 2
Pos	Team	Pld	W	D	L	GF	GA	GD	Pts	Qualification
1	Rangers	18	9	3	6	25	25	0	30	Playoffs
2	Universidad Católica	18	9	2	7	37	33	+4	29	Playoffs
3	Everton	18	9	1	8	28	25	+3	28	Play-off Match
4	Deportes La Serena	18	7	6	5	37	34	+3	27	
5	Provincial Osorno	18	3	1	14	18	38	−20	10	

Group 3
Pos	Team	Pld	W	D	L	GF	GA	GD	Pts	Qualification
1	Palestino	18	10	3	5	29	22	+7	33	Playoffs
2	O'Higgins	18	8	4	6	39	35	+4	28	Playoffs
3	Santiago Morning	18	7	5	6	30	32	−2	26	
4	Universidad de Concepción	18	5	6	7	32	32	0	21	
5	Deportes Melipilla	18	3	2	13	19	38	−19	11	

Group 4
Pos	Team	Pld	W	D	L	GF	GA	GD	Pts	Qualification
1	Huachipato	18	8	3	7	34	32	+2	27	Playoffs
2	Cobreloa	18	8	3	7	34	32	+2	27	Play-off Match
3	Audax Italiano	18	6	6	6	25	25	0	24	
4	Deportes Antofagasta	18	7	2	9	20	27	−7	23	
5	Cobresal	18	5	6	7	24	26	−2	21	

Updated to match(es) played on November 9, 2008. Source: RSSSF
Rules for classification: 1) points; 2) goal difference; 3) number of goals scored.

=== Play-off match ===
Team 1	Score	Team 2
Everton	0–3	Cobreloa

=== Knock-out round ===
The clubs were seeded by their first phase standings.

Quarterfinals
8	Cobreloa	3	2	5
1	Universidad de Chile	0	3	3
7	Huachipato	1	2	3
2	Colo-Colo	1	4	5
6	O'Higgins	2	1	3
3	Palestino	2	2	4
5	Universidad Católica	3	1	4
4	Rangers	3	1	4

Semifinals
8	Cobreloa	3	2	5
2	Colo-Colo	3	2	5
3	Palestino	0	2	2
4	Rangers	0	2	2

Final
2	Colo-Colo	1	3	4
3	Palestino	1	1	2

Primera Division
2008 Clausura champions
Colo-Colo
28th title

Colo-Colo qualified to the 2009 Copa Libertadores Second Stage.

=== Top-five goalscorers ===
P	Player	Team	Goals
1	(Argentina) Lucas Barrios	Colo-Colo	18
2	(Argentina) Gastón Cellerino	Rangers	16
2	(Paraguay) Nestor Bareiro	O'Higgins	16
4	(Chile) Julio Gutiérrez	Universidad Católica	12
5	(Argentina) Gustavo Canales	Deportes La Serena	10
5	(Chile) Leonardo Monje	Huachipato	10
5	(Argentina) Gustavo Savoia	Cobreloa	10

== Relegation ==
Four teams were relegated this year to reduce the field for next season to 18 teams.

=== Aggregate table ===
The aggregate table is only a sum of the two first-stages from the Apertura and Clausura tournaments. The bottom-two teams are relegated from the results of this table.

Pos	Team	Pld	W	D	L	GF	GA	GD	Pts	Qualification or relegation
1	Universidad de Chile	37	21	5	11	67	44	+23	68	
2	Universidad Católica	37	20	5	12	74	52	+22	65	
3	O'Higgins	37	18	10	9	69	52	+17	64	
4	Everton	37	19	3	15	62	55	+7	60	
5	Colo-Colo	37	17	9	11	67	48	+19	60	
6	Audax Italiano	37	17	7	13	60	50	+10	58	
7	Ñublense	37	15	13	9	49	43	+6	58	
8	Palestino	37	17	6	14	57	49	+8	57	
9	Santiago Morning	37	16	8	13	65	74	−9	56	
10	Huachipato	37	15	9	13	62	54	+8	54	
11	Rangers	37	15	9	13	48	50	−2	54	
12	La Serena	37	14	11	12	66	63	+3	53	
13	Cobresal	37	14	10	13	59	52	+7	52	
14	Cobreloa	37	14	8	15	59	61	−2	50	
15	Unión Española	37	14	7	16	48	59	−11	49	Relegation/Promotion Playoff
16	Universidad de Concepción	37	11	9	17	59	65	−6	42	Relegation/Promotion Playoff
17	Antofagasta	37	11	7	19	36	56	−20	40	Relegated to the Primera B by the Relegation Table
18	Provincial Osorno	37	8	2	27	38	77	−39	26	Relegated to the Primera B by the Relegation Table
19	Melipilla	37	6	3	28	41	78	−37	21	Relegated to the Primera B by the Aggregate Table
20	Concepción	19	7	3	9	33	37	−4	18 (Note: Deportes Concepción withdrew from the Clausura tournament.)	Relegated to the Primera B by the Aggregate Table

Updated to match(es) played on November 9, 2008. Source: RSSSF
Rules for classification: 1) points; 2) goal difference; 3) number of goals scored.

=== Relegation table ===
The next two teams to be relegated were determined through a special aggregate table for the 2007 & 2008 season. The teams' performances were put under a specific formula (shown below) and then ranked. The two worst teams who have not been relegated by this season's aggregate table were relegated.

$P_d = 0.4 \cdot \;P_{2007} \cdot \;{\frac{19}{20}} + 0.6 \cdot \left( \;P_{Ap-2008} + \;P_{Cl-2008} \cdot \;{\frac{19}{18}} \right) ,$

In the case of Rangers, Provincial Osorno, and Santiago Morning, the following formula was used since they were not in the Primera División in the 2007 season:

$P_d = P_{Ap-2008}+P_{Cl-2008}\cdot \;{\frac{19}{18}} .$

In both formulas, P_{d} is the relegation average; P_{2007} is the total points earned in the 2007 season; P_{Ap-2008} is the points earned in this season's Apertura tournament; P_{Cl-2008} is the points earned in this season's Clausura tournament.

Pos	Team	P_{desc}	P_{2007}	P_{Ap 2008}	P_{Cl 2008}
1	Universidad Católica	70,37	30,40	21,60	18,37
2	Audax Italiano	70,18	34,58	20,40	15,20
3	Colo-Colo	69,78	32,68	16,20	20,90
4	Universidad de Chile	68,67	26,60	18,00	24,07
5	O'Higgins	62,51	23,18	21,60	17,73
6	Huachipato	58,00	24,70	16,20	16,10
7	Santiago Morning	57,44	0,00	30,00	27,44
8	Ñublense	57,41	22,04	24,60	10,77
9	Cobresal	56,22	24,32	18,60	13,30
10	Cobreloa	55,98	25,08	13,80	16,10
11	Rangers	55,67	0,00	24,00	31,67
12	Palestino	53,92	18,62	14,40	19,90
13	Everton	51,75	14,82	19,20	17,73
14	La Serena	50,94	18,24	15,60	17,10
15	Unión Española	47,33	17,10	14,40	15,83
16	Universidad de Concepción	45,66	19,76	12,60	13,30
17	Antofagasta	42,63	17,86	10,20	14,57
18	Melipilla	33,87	20,90	6,00	6,97
19	Provincial Osorno	26,56	0,00	16,00	10,56

Relegated by the Relegation Table
Already relegated by the Aggregate Table

=== Relegation/promotion play-off ===
The 15th & 16th place team in the aggregate table have to play two promotion/relegation matches the Segunda División runner-up (Puerto Montt) and the winner of the Segunda División Apertura/Clausura play-off (Coquimbo Unido). The winners will play in the Primera División the next season.

Team 1	Agg.	Team 2	1st leg	2nd leg
Coquimbo Unido	1–5	Universidad de Concepción	0–2	1–3
Puerto Montt	4–5	Unión Española	1–2	3–3

== See also ==
- Chilean Primera División
- List of 2008 Primera División de Chile transfers
