= Rubén Darío (disambiguation) =

Rubén Darío (1867–1916) was a Nicaraguan poet.

Rubén Darío may also refer to:

== Named for Rubén Darío ==
- Rubén Darío National Theatre, Managua, Nicaragua
- National Library of Nicaragua Rubén Darío, Managua, Nicaragua
- Rubén Darío (Madrid Metro), a railway station in Madrid, Spain
- Ruben Dario Middle School, Miami, Florida, US

== Other people ==
- Rubén Darío (politician), Spanish civil servant, professor and politician
- Rubén Darío Aguilera (born 1978), Paraguayan footballer
- Rubén Darío Bustos (born 1981), Colombian football player
- Rubén Darío Ferrer (born 1975), Argentine footballer
- Rubén Darío Gigena (born 1980), Argentine football striker
- Rubén Darío Gómez (1940–2010), Colombian road racing cyclist
- Rubén Darío Hernández (born 1965), Colombian football striker
- Rubén Darío Insúa (born 1961), Argentine football player and manager
- Rubén Darío Larrosa (born 1979), Argentine professional footballer
- Rubén Darío Palacio (1962–2003), Colombian boxer
- Rubén Darío Paredes (born 1933), military ruler of Panama from 1982 to 1983
- Rubén Darío Velázquez (born 1975), Colombian football midfielder
