= Luis Godoy =

Luis Godoy can refer to:

- Luis Godoy (boxer) (born 1952), Colombian boxer
- Luis Godoy (footballer) (born 1978), Chilean footballer
- Luis Godoy Gómez (1928 – 2016), Chilean philosopher and politician
