= Francisco Castillo =

Francisco Castillo may refer to:

- Francisco Castillo Fajardo, Marquis of Villadarias (1642–1716), Spanish general
- Francisco Castillo Nájera (1886–1954), Mexican diplomat
- Francisco Castillo (footballer) (born 1985), Chilean footballer
- Francisco Castillo (water polo) (1921–1997), Spanish water polo player
