= 1986 South American Under-16 Football Championship squads =

The 1986 South American U-16 Championship was an international association football tournament held in Peru. The ten national teams involved in the tournament were required to register a squad; only players in these squads were eligible to take part in the tournament.
Each player had to have been born after 1 January 1970.

== Group A ==
=== Argentina ===
Head coach: (Argentina) Carlos Pachamé and A.T. (Argentina) Roberto Mariani and (Argentina) Daniel Romeo

No.	Pos.	Player	Date of birth (age)	Club
1	GK	Sandro Daniel Guzmán		(Argentine Football Association) Velez Sarsfield
3	DF	Alejandro Eliseo Allegue		(Argentine Football Association) Racing Club
4	DF	Christian Juan Dollberg	3 November 1971 (aged 14)	(Argentine Football Association) Argentinos Juniors
7	MF	Juan Jose Borrelli		(Argentine Football Association) River Plate
2	DF	Fernando Andres Gamboa	28 October 1971 (aged 14)	(Argentine Football Association) Newell's Old Boys
11	FW	Javier Oscar Alonso		(Argentine Football Association) Argentinos Juniors
10	MF	Pablo César Fernández	30 May 1971 (aged 15)	(Argentine Football Association) Gimnasia y Esgrima La Plata

(N°1)Sandro Daniel Guzman GK 03/08/1971 Velez Sarsfield (Argentina) (N°12)Roberto Oscar Bonano GK 24/01/1970 Rosario Central (Rosario) (Argentina) (N°3)Alejandro Eliseo Allegue DF 06/11/1971 Racing Club Avellaneda (Argentina) (N°7)Juan Jose Borrelli MF 08/11/1970 River Plate (Argentina)

=== Uruguay ===
Head coach: (Uruguay) Luis Romero

No.	Pos.	Player	Date of birth (age)	Club
12	GK	Marcelo Villasante		(Uruguayan Football Association) Nacional
5	MF	Gabriel Pereira		(Uruguayan Football Association) Danubio
7	FW	Osvaldo Miraballes		(Uruguayan Football Association) Nacional
2	DF	Leonardo Castiñeiras		(Uruguayan Football Association) Danubio
9	FW	Wadil Guerrero		(Uruguayan Football Association) Danubio
11	MF	Marcelo Saralegui	18 April 1971 (aged 15)	(Uruguayan Football Association) Nacional
15	MF	Enzo Javier Azambuja		(Uruguayan Football Association) Central Español
3	DF	Gabriel Delor		(Uruguayan Football Association) River Plate
13	FW	Leonardo Barizzoni		(Uruguayan Football Association) Peñarol
19	FW	Rafael Adrian Bianchi	7 January 1971 (aged 15)	(Uruguayan Football Association) Central Español
14	FW	Pablo Irigoyen		(Uruguayan Football Association) OFI
1	GK	Washington Danilo Fagúndez		(Uruguayan Football Association) Sud America
4	DF	Gustavo Teixeira		(Uruguayan Football Association) OFI
10	MF	Diego Dorta	31 December 1971 (aged 14)	(Uruguayan Football Association) Central Español
16	DF	Juan Bentancur		(Uruguayan Football Association) Nacional
17	FW	Karyl Medina		(Uruguayan Football Association) Bella Vista
18	MF	Gustavo Tejeria		(Uruguayan Football Association) OFI
6	MF	Marcos Garín		(Uruguayan Football Association) OFI
8	FW	Rodolfo Javier Armas		(Uruguayan Football Association) Central Español

== Group B ==
=== Chile ===
(Chile) D.T. Bernardo Francisco Bello Gutierrez

GK (N°1) Rafael Arturo Contador|Rafael Contador Colo Colo (Chile) 27/08/1970 DF (N°2) Rodrigo Perez Salgado|Rodrigo Perez Salgado Audax Italiano (Chile) 20/03/1971 DF (N°3) Victor Hugo Perez|Victor Hugo Perez Universidad de Chile (Chile) 18/09/1970 DF (N°4) Luis Gonzalez|Luis Heriberto Gonzalez Soto Audax Italiano (Chile) 06/08/1970 MF (N°5) Julio Vergara|Julio Homero Vergara Deportes Magallanes (Chile) 15/09/1970 DF (N°6) Pablo Letelier|Pablo Cesar Letelier Deportes Antofagasta (Chile) 22/09/1970 MF (N°7) Nilbaldo Ibarra|Nilbaldo Adrian Ibarra Universidad de Chile (Chile) 11/05/1971 FW (N°8) Leonardo Soto|Leonardo Enrique Soto Colo Colo (Chile) 09/02/1971 FW (N°9) Ricardo Monje|Ricardo Andres Monje Universidad Catolica (Chile) 08/06/1971 MF (N°10) Cristian Torres|Cristian Andres Torres Union Deportivo Cobreloa (Chile) 11/11/1970 FW (N°11) Claudio Troncoso|Claudio Andres Troncoso Colo Colo (Chile) 31/08/1970 GK (N°12) Rene Molina|Rene Gabriel Molina Universidad Catolica (Chile) 02/08/1970 DF (N°13) Juan Pablo Villalta|Juan Pablo Villalta Universidad Catolica (Chile) 30/09/1970 MF (N°14) German Campos|German Patricio Campos Deportes Magallanes (Chile) 26/08/1970 MF (N°15) Mario Martinez|Mario Alejandro Martinez Universidad Catolica (Chile) 14/10/1970 FW (N°16) Claudio Betancourtt|Claudio Roberto Betancourtt O Higgins (Chile) 21/08/1970 **(MF N°17)Rodrigo Castañeda (Chile) FW (N°18) Marcelo Vega|Francisco Marcelo Vega Regional Atacama (Chile) 12/08/1971.

=== Brazil ===
Head coach: (Brazil) Jair Pereira da Silva and A.T. (Brazil) Paulo Cesar Carpegiani and (Brazil) Dino Sani

No.	Pos.	Player	Date of birth (age)	Club
22	GK	Alexandre Escobar Ferreira	2 January 1972 (aged 14)	(Brazilian Football Confederation) São Paulo
1	GK	Édson Barbieri de Azevedo Grillo	22 January 1971 (aged 15)	(Brazilian Football Confederation) Ponte Preta
12	GK	Emerson de Souza Ferreti	3 September 1971 (aged 15)	(Brazilian Football Confederation) Grêmio
3	DF	Antônio César dos Santos		(Brazilian Football Confederation) Matsubara
13	DF	André Gustavo Guarino Gianoni	31 January 1971 (aged 15)	(Brazilian Football Confederation) Ponte Preta
21	DF	Mário Carlos Pereira Alves	14 August 1970 (aged 16)	(Brazilian Football Confederation) Flamengo
4	DF	Rodnei Cláudio Alexandre		(Brazilian Football Confederation) Palmeiras
2	DF	Ademílson Tomaz de Oliveira		(Brazilian Football Confederation) Juventus
6	DF	Renato de Moraes		(Brazilian Football Confederation) São Bento
19	DF	Rogério Lourenço	20 March 1971 (aged 15)	(Brazilian Football Confederation) Flamengo
16	DF	Sandro Forner	16 December 1970 (aged 15)	(Brazilian Football Confederation) Ponte Preta
14	DF	Wilson Luiz Seneme	28 August 1970 (aged 16)	(Brazilian Football Confederation) Guarani
5	MF	Roberto de Assis Moreira	10 January 1970 (aged 16)	(Brazilian Football Confederation) Grêmio
7	MF	Benedito Aparecido de Oliveira	12 February 1971 (aged 15)	(Brazilian Football Confederation) São Paulo
25	MF	Eduardo Machado Camargo		(Brazilian Football Confederation) Grêmio
10	MF	Mário Alexandre Xavier	18 November 1970 (aged 15)	(Brazilian Football Confederation) Flamengo
15	MF	Everson Rodriguez	8 May 1971 (aged 15)	(Brazilian Football Confederation) Matsubara
8	MF	Sergio Murilo Ribeiro		(Brazilian Football Confederation) Internacional
11	MF	José Maurício de Souza Antunes	23 November 1970 (aged 15)	(Brazilian Football Confederation) Vasco da Gama
24	FW	Abelardo Xavier de Oliveira	14 January 1971 (aged 15)	(Brazilian Football Confederation) Corinthians
26	FW	Gilberto Alves da Silva	26 February 1971 (aged 15)	(Brazilian Football Confederation) Bahia
9	FW	Marco Antônio da Conceição		(Brazilian Football Confederation) Santos
18	FW	William Ramos da Costa		(Brazilian Football Confederation) Flamengo
20	FW	Valdecyr Silva Junior		(Brazilian Football Confederation) Vasco da Gama
23	FW	Roberto Martins César		(Brazilian Football Confederation) Cruzeiro
17	FW	Rogério do Carmo Oliveira	25 March 1971 (aged 15)	(Brazilian Football Confederation) Juventus

- (N°2)Ademilson Tomaz de Oliveira DF 07/05/1971 Club Atletico Juventus (Brazil)
- (N°3)Antontio Cesar Dos Santos DF 29/08/1970 Sociedade Esportiva Matsubara (Brazil)
- (N°4)Rodnei Claudio Alexandre DF 21/01/1971 Sociedade Esportiva Palmeiras (Brazil)
- (N°6)Renato de Moraes DF 07/07/1970 Esporte Clube Sao Bento (Brazil)
- (N°8)Sergio Murilo Ribeiro MF 30/08/1971 Sport Club Internacional (Brazil)
- (N°18)William Ramos da Costa FW 06/08/1972 Clube de Regatas do Flamengo (Brazil)
- (N°20)Valdecyr Silva Junior FW 14/05/1971 Clube de Regatas Vasco da Gama (Brazil)
- (N°23)Roberto Martins Cesar FW 09/02/1971 Cruzeiro Esporte Clube (Brazil)
- (N°25)Eduardo Machado Camargo MF 03/03/1972 Gremio Porto Alegre (Brazil)

=== Ecuador ===
Head Coach: (Brazil) Moacyr Claudino Pinto da Silva
