= Lucas Suárez =

Lucas Suárez may refer to:

- Lucas Suárez (footballer, born 1984), Argentine footballer
- Lucas Suárez (footballer, born 1995), Argentine footballer
