= Martín Gianfelice =

Argentine footballer

Personal information
- Full name: Alberto Martín Gianfelice
- Date of birth: 12 June 1980 (age 46)
- Place of birth: Zárate, Buenos Aires, Argentina
- Height: 1.81 m (5 ft 11 in)
- Position: Striker

Youth career
- Los Andes

Senior career*
Years	Team	Apps	(Gls)
1999–2001	Los Andes		
2001	→ Puerto Montt (loan)	3	(0)
2001–2003	Almagro	47	(14)
2002	→ Almirante Brown (loan)	14	(12)
2002	→ Real Cartagena (loan)	6	(1)
2003–2004	Los Andes		
2004	Rosario Central	0	(0)
2005	Ben Hur	9	(1)
2005	Correcaminos UAT	5	(0)
2006	All Boys	14	(3)
2006	Independiente Rivadavia	13	(6)
2007–2015	Comunicaciones	145	(30)
2008	→ La Serena (loan)	14	(5)
2009	→ Estudiantes BA (loan)	14	(4)
2011	→ Rangers de Talca (loan)	17	(1)
2013–2014	→ Tristán Suárez (loan)	26	(0)
2015	Defensores Unidos	9	(0)
2016–2018	Berazategui	43	(14)
2016–2017	→ San Martín Burzaco (loan)	7	(0)
- * Club domestic league appearances and goals

Alberto Martín Gianfelice (born 12 June 1980) is a retired Argentinian footballer who played as forward.

He has played at Argentina, Chile, Colombia and Mexico.

== Club career ==
He was born at Zárate, Buenos Aires in 1980. Nineteen years later, he joined Club Atlético Los Andes, team where he began to play football. However, he had a brief spell there, and in 2001 he moved to Chilean side Deportes Puerto Montt, which was brief too (only 6 months).

In mid-2001 he joined Club Almagro from the Primera B Metropolitana. He stayed there until 2003, being loaned during his spell, to Almirante Brown and Colombia's Real Cartagena.

In June 2003, Gianfelice returned to his first club, Club Atlético Los Andes, playing the 2003–04 season at the second-tier. Nevertheless, at the end of that season, he was signed by Rosario Central from the Argentinian top-level.

After spells at Ben Hur and Mexico's Correcaminos UAT during 2005, as well as All Boys and Independiente Rivadavia in 2006, the incoming year he joined Comunicaciones.

In December 2007, Gianfelice joined Chilean first-tier team Deportes La Serena. After failing to play any game during the 2008 Torneo Apertura, in the second half now at the Clausura, he played 14 games and scored five goals, one of them in a 2–0 Antofagasta, which wasn't exempt of polemic due to obscene gestures.

In 2011, he returned to Chile, joining Rangers de Talca on loan from Comunicaciones, club which he returned in mid-2009 after playing for Estudiantes de Buenos Aires the first half of that year. For the 2013–14 season he was loaned again, now to Tristán Suárez. In 2015, he definitively left Comunicaciones and joined Defensores Unidos.

In 2016, Gianfelice signed for Asociación Deportiva Berazategui.

== Statistics ==
Team	Season	League		Cup		Total	
Team	Season	Apps	Goals	Apps	Goals	Apps	Goals
La Serena	2008	14	5	0	0	14	5
La Serena	Total	14	5	0	0	14	5
Rangers de Talca	2011	17	1	–		17	1
Rangers de Talca	Total	17	1	–		17	1
Career total		31	6	0	0	31	6
