= Fernando Saavedra =

Chilean footballer (born 1986)

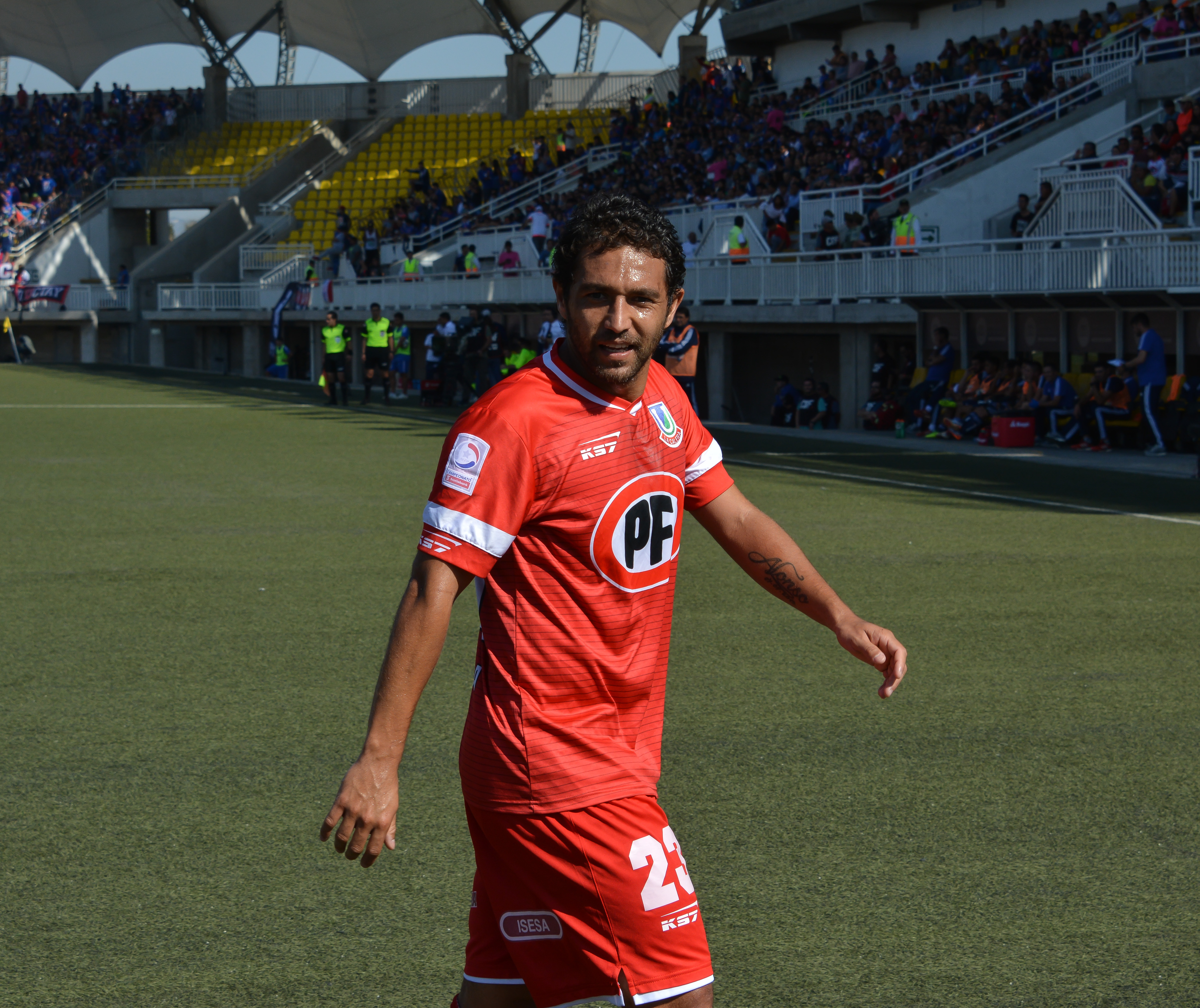
- Saavedra with Unión La Calera in 2018.

Personal information
- Full name: Fernando Antonio Saavedra Valencia
- Date of birth: April 10, 1986 (age 40)
- Place of birth: La Ligua, Chile
- Height: 1.70 m (5 ft 7 in)
- Position: Attacking midfielder

Youth career
- Deportes La Serena

Senior career*
Years	Team	Apps	(Gls)
2005–2007	Deportes La Serena	33	(6)
2006–2007	→ Quilmes (loan)	15	(1)
2008–2016	Everton	220	(20)
2010	→ Unión San Felipe (loan)	5	(1)
2016–2017	San Luis	18	(0)
2017–2018	Unión La Calera	43	(3)
2019	Deportes Temuco	20	(0)
2020–2022	Everton	30	(0)
Total		384	(31)
- * Club domestic league appearances and goals

Fernando Antonio Saavedra Valencia (born in 1986) is a Chilean former footballer who played as an attacking midfielder.

== Career ==
He began his career with Deportes La Serena and his last club was Everton.

Between 2006 and 2007, he played for Quilmes of the Primera División Argentina.

He retired at the end of the 2022 season.

== Post-retirement ==
Saavedra has worked as coach for the municipal football academies of Viña del Mar.

== Honors ==
Everton

- Primera División de Chile (1): 2008 Apertura

Unión La Calera

- Primera B de Chile (1): 2017 Transición
