= Ángel Rojas (footballer, born 1985) =

Chilean footballer (born 1985)

Personal information
- Full name: Ángel Orlando Rojas Ortega
- Date of birth: April 10, 1985 (age 41)
- Place of birth: Santiago, Chile
- Height: 1.71 m (5 ft 7 in)
- Position: Midfielder

Youth career
- Universidad de Chile

Senior career*
| Years | Team | Apps | (Gls) |
| 2004–2009 | Universidad de Chile | 78 | (4) |
| 2006 | → Everton (loan) | 14 | (1) |
| 2008 | → Everton (loan) | 26 | (1) |
| 2010 | Goiás | 0 | (0) |
| 2010–2011 | Universidad de Chile | 9 | (1) |
| 2011 | → Everton (loan) | 0 | (0) |
| 2011 | San Luis | 14 | (1) |
| 2012–2013 | Everton | 77 | (15) |
| 2014–2015 | Kerkyra | 11 | (0) |
| 2015 | Chania | 3 | (0) |
| 2015–2017 | Coquimbo Unido | 43 | (6) |
| 2019–2021 | Deportes Recoleta | 54 | (9) |
| Total | | 329 | (38) |

International career
| 2005 | Chile U20 | 5 | (0) |
- * Club domestic league appearances and goals

Ángel Orlando Rojas Ortega (born 10 April 1985) is a Chilean former professional footballer who played as a midfielder.

A product of the Universidad de Chile youth system, he played primarily for that club and Everton, and also had spells in Brazil and Greece.

== Club career ==
=== Universidad de Chile and Everton ===
Rojas came through the youth ranks of Universidad de Chile and made his first-team debut in 2004. He was part of the squad that won the 2004 Apertura before spending the 2006 season on loan at Everton. After returning to Universidad de Chile in 2007, he rejoined Everton on loan for the 2008 season.

At Everton, Rojas was part of the team that won the 2008 Apertura. He made 18 appearances during the tournament and scored once. His goal came in a 3–2 away victory over Unión Española in March 2008, a result that moved Everton into sole possession of first place in the championship. Everton subsequently defeated Colo-Colo in the championship final to claim its first league title since 1976.

Rojas returned to Universidad de Chile in 2009 and became a regular during the team's successful Apertura campaign. He scored once during the championship, and started both legs of the final against Unión Española, which Universidad de Chile won 2–1 on aggregate.

Following the 2009 season, Rojas left Universidad de Chile after the expiration of his contract and signed for Brazilian Série A club Goiás. He was the club's first announced signing ahead of the 2010 season. His spell in Brazil was brief, and he returned to Universidad de Chile in June 2010 after struggling to establish himself as a regular starter. His return came as the club prepared for the semi-finals of the 2010 Copa Libertadores.

=== San Luis and return to Everton ===
In 2011, Rojas had spells with Everton and San Luis. While playing for San Luis, he scored against Everton in a 3–1 Primera B defeat at the Estadio Sausalito.

He returned to Everton in 2012 and played an important role in the club's successful bid for promotion to the Primera División. In the first leg of the promotion play-off against Universidad de Concepción, Rojas converted a ninth-minute penalty to give Everton a 1–0 victory at Sausalito. Everton then won the return match 3–1 in Concepción to secure promotion, with Rojas again starting in midfield.

Rojas remained with Everton after its return to the top flight. During the 2013–14 Apertura he scored five goals in 16 appearances, and in March 2014 he scored the winning goal in a 2–1 victory over local rivals Santiago Wanderers.

=== Late career ===
In 2014, Rojas moved to Greece, joining Kerkyra in the Super League Greece. He made 11 league appearances during the 2014–15 season before subsequently joining Chania.

Rojas returned to Chile in 2015 and signed for Coquimbo Unido. He scored during his league debut against Rangers, converting a late penalty in a 2–2 draw. Days later, he scored the opening goal in a 2–1 Copa Chile victory over Cobresal, which secured Coquimbo Unido a place in the round of 16.

He continued to feature prominently for Coquimbo during the 2015–16 season. Rojas scored against Deportes Temuco in October 2015, and scored twice from the penalty spot in a 4–4 draw against the same club in March 2016 as Coquimbo fought to avoid relegation from the Primera B. He remained with the club until 2017.

After a period away from professional football, Rojas joined Deportes Recoleta in 2019. He remained with the Santiago club for three seasons and was part of the squad that won the Segunda División Profesional de Chile in 2021, securing the first promotion to the Primera B in the club's history. Rojas made 14 league appearances and scored three goals during the championship season.

== International career ==
Rojas represented the Chile under-20 team in 2005. He was selected by coach José Sulantay for the 2005 South American U-20 Championship in Colombia, as part of a midfield that also included Matías Fernández, Carlos Villanueva, Pedro Morales, Carlos Carmona and José Pedro Fuenzalida. Chile finished fourth and qualified for the 2005 FIFA World Youth Championship in the Netherlands.

Rojas subsequently took part in the World Youth Championship, where Chile progressed from the group stage before being eliminated by the Netherlands in the round of 16.

== Honours ==
Universidad de Chile

- Chilean Primera División: 2004 Apertura, 2009 Apertura

Everton

- Chilean Primera División: 2008 Apertura
