= Leandro Delgado =

Chilean footballer (born 1982)

Personal information
- Full name: Leandro Javier Delgado Plenkovich
- Date of birth: 15 July 1982 (age 44)
- Place of birth: Puerto Montt, Chile
- Height: 1.78 m (5 ft 10 in)
- Position: Centre-back

Youth career
- 1992–2002: Deportes Puerto Montt

Senior career*
| Years | Team | Apps | (Gls) |
| 2002–2006 | Deportes Puerto Montt | 140 | (4) |
| 2007 | → Cobreloa (loan) | 20 | (0) |
| 2008–2010 | Everton | 38 | (3) |
| 2010–2011 | Unión Española | 60 | (3) |
| 2012–2013 | Colo-Colo | 33 | (0) |
| 2013–2014 | Deportes Iquique | 25 | (0) |
| 2014–2016 | Huachipato | 42 | (1) |
| 2017–2018 | Deportes Puerto Montt | 28 | (1) |
| Total | | 386 | (12) |

International career
| 2011 | Chile | 1 | (0) |

Managerial career
- 2026–: Deportes Puerto Montt (assistant)
- * Club domestic league appearances and goals

Leandro Javier Delgado Plenkovich (born 15 July 1982) is a Chilean former footballer who played as a centre-back.

== Club career ==
Leandro Delgado started his career in Puerto Montt, at those times in the Primera División Chilena, alternating his playing position between defence and the midfield. In 2007 season, Delgado was transferred on loan to Cobreloa, and played Apertura and Clausura tournaments. In 2008, Delgado signed with Everton where he played for two seasons and won the 2008 Torneo Apertura. In 2010, Unión Española have signed the defender from Corporación Deportiva Everton de Viña del Mar to reinforce its squad for the current season.

On 5 January 2012 it was reported that Delgado came to an agreement with Chilean giants Colo-Colo with the "albos" buying the 100% of his pass to Unión Española, and with a contract for three years.

== International career ==
Delgado made his debut for Chile national football team in a friendly match against Paraguay on 21 December 2011 at the orders of team manager Claudio Borghi.

== Coaching career ==
In June 2026, Delgado joined the technical staff of Emilio Mancilla for Deportes Puerto Montt as assistant coach.

== Personal life ==
Leandro Delgado Plenković is of Croatian descent. The surname Plenković has his origin in the town of Svirče, near the city of Jelsa, Croatia on the island of Hvar.

== Honours ==
=== Player ===
Everton

- Primera División de Chile (1): 2008 Apertura
