= Cristian Ríos =

Argentine footballer (born 1980)

Cristián Ríos
Personal information
- Full name: Cristián Ríos
- Date of birth: 18 July 1980 (age 46)
- Place of birth: Buenos Aires, Argentina
- Height: 1.77 m (5 ft 10 in)
- Position: Midfielder

Senior career*
Years	Team	Apps	(Gls)
1999–2003	Unión de Santa Fe		
2001–2002	Racing Club		
2003	Independiente Medellín		
2004	Boca Juniors		
2004–2005	Club Almagro		
2006	San Martín (SJ)		
2006	Talleres de Córdoba		
2007	Cobreloa		
2008–2009	Cobresal		
2005–2007	Huracán		
2009–2010	Iquique		
2011–2012	Unión de Sunchales		
2012	Juventud Unida		
- * Club domestic league appearances and goals as of 18 March 2010

Cristian Ríos (born 18 July 1980) was an Argentine footballer.

He played for clubs like Racing Club, Boca Juniors, Cobreloa and Municipal Iquique.

== Honours ==
=== Club ===
Racing

- Argentine Primera División (1): 2001 Clausura

Deportes Iquique

- Primera B (1): 2010
- Copa Chile (1): 2010
