= Héctor Barra =

Chilean footballer (born 1978)

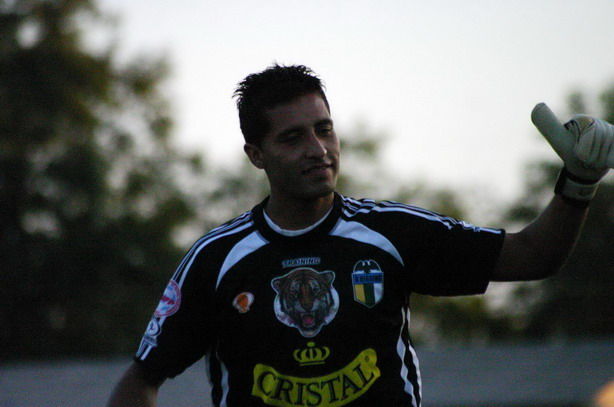

Personal information
- Full name: Héctor Alejandro Barra Zúñiga
- Date of birth: 24 April 1978 (age 48)
- Place of birth: Rancagua, Chile
- Height: 1.83 m (6 ft 0 in)
- Position: Goalkeeper

Senior career*
Years	Team	Apps	(Gls)
2001–2007	O'Higgins	68	(0)
2008	Melipilla	6	(0)
2009	Curicó Unido	6	(0)
2010	Santiago Morning	2	(0)
2011–2014	Magallanes	49	(0)
- * Club domestic league appearances and goals as of 18 March 2020

Héctor Alejandro Barra Zúñiga (born 24 April 1978) is a Chilean former footballer. He played for O'Higgins.

== Career ==
He joined O'Higgins F.C. in 1998, and in 200,1 he debuted in his professional career. He was in the Rancagüino team until 2007; he lost his title to Carol Texas in Clausura 2007.
