= Juan Esteban Godoy =

Paraguayan footballer (born 1982)

Personal information
- Full name: Juan Esteban Godoy Duarte
- Date of birth: 5 January 1982 (age 44)
- Place of birth: Asunción, Paraguay
- Height: 1.78 m (5 ft 10 in)
- Position: Midfielder

Senior career*
Years	Team	Apps	(Gls)
2004–2007	Sol de América	51	(7)
2005	→ General Caballero ZC (loan)	9	(2)
2006	→ 12 de Octubre (loan)	17	(0)
2006	→ Sportivo Luqueño (loan)	9	(0)
2007	Everton	5	(0)
2008	Deportes Antofagasta	5	(0)
2008–2009	Rubio Ñu		
2010	Fernando de la Mora		
2010	Sportivo Trinidense		
2011–2012	River Plate Asunción		

Managerial career
- Heber Valley United
- * Club domestic league appearances and goals

Juan Esteban Godoy Duarte (born 5 January 1982) is a Paraguayan former footballer who played as a midfielder.

== Career ==
In 2005, Godoy played for General Caballero ZC.

Besides Paraguay, Godoy played in Chile for Everton and Deportes Antofagasta in the Primera División.

His last club was River Plate de Paraguay.

In 2021, he emigrated to the United States and has developed a career as soccer coach for clubs like Heber Valley United.
