= Cristián Morán =

Chilean footballer (born 1984)

Personal information
- Full name: Cristián Andres Morán Vallejos
- Date of birth: 27 July 1984 (age 42)
- Place of birth: Chiguayante, Chile
- Height: 1.83 m (6 ft 0 in)
- Position: Defender

Senior career*
Years	Team	Apps	(Gls)
1996–2002	Fernandez Vial		
2003–2007	Cobreloa		
2007	Antofagasta		
2008–2009	Ñublense		
2011	Deportes Concepción		
- * Club domestic league appearances and goals as of 22:06, 14 February 2010 (UTC)

Cristián Andrés Morán Vallejos (born 27 July 1984) is a former Chilean footballer.

He is remembered for his spell at Cobreloa, Primera División de Chile's powerhouse club.

== Career ==
Morán began his career playing in the lower divisions of Fernández Vial from 1996 to 2002. Then he went to Cobreloa, at the age of 19. In the Clausura 2007 championship he went to Deportes Antofagasta. He signed for Deportivo Ñublense for the 2008 season.

== Honours ==
=== Club ===
Cobreloa

- Primera División de Chile (3): 2003 Apertura, 2003 Clausura, 2004 Clausura
