= Mauricio Cataldo =

Chilean footballer (born 1979)

Personal details
- Born: 28 February 1979 (age 47) Santiago, Chile
- Party: Patriotic Union
- Height: 1.70 m (5 ft 7 in)
Association football career
- Full name: Mauricio Eduardo Cataldo Mancilla
- Position: Forward
Senior career*
Years	Team	Apps	(Gls)
1998–2004	Audax Italiano	12	(5)
1999–2000	→ Provincial Osorno (loan)	0	(0)
2003	→ U. de Concepción (loan)	21	(4)
2004	Cobreloa	8	(0)
2005	Unión Española	8	(3)
2005–2006	Unión San Felipe	9	(0)
2006	Santiago Morning	7	(0)
2007	Lota Schwager	6	(2)
2008	Ñublense	16	(0)
2012	Fernández Vial	–	(–)
Total		87	(14)
- * Club domestic league appearances and goals

Mauricio Eduardo Cataldo Mancilla (born 28 February 1979) is a Chilean former footballer.

== Club career ==
He is well remembered for his rabona golden goal to then Universidad de Chile's goalkeeper Johnny Herrera during the Chilean 2003 Torneo Apertura. That goal occurred in the extra Time of a playoff's quarterfinals match to the define the tournament's champion.

== After football ==
=== Politics ===
In 2016, he decided to run for councilor, reason why he sought support at political party Patriotic Union, an instrumental left–wing party (self-proclaimed "progressivist") from marxist–leninist organization Communist Party of Chile–Proletarian Action. He unsuccessfully competed in the elections in La Florida, Santiago's commune, where he failed to reach a municipal post. In 2019, again he announced his intention to compete for the municipal elections in La Florida.

== Personal life ==
He has repeatedly said he had problems with alcohol and that he frequented getting drunk before training.

In October 2025, Cataldo suffered a stroke and was immediately operated on.

== Honours ==
=== Club ===
Cobreloa

- Primera División de Chile (1): 2004 Clausura

Unión Española

- Primera División de Chile (1): 2005 Apertura
