= Rodrigo Viligrón =

Chilean footballer (born 1976)

Personal information
- Full name: Rodrigo Andrés Viligrón Barrientos
- Date of birth: 14 May 1976 (age 50)
- Place of birth: Purranque, Chile
- Height: 1.76 m (5 ft 9 in)
- Position: Defensive midfielder

Youth career
- Deportes Puerto Montt

Senior career*
Years	Team	Apps	(Gls)
1992–1999	Deportes Puerto Montt	214	(0)
2000	Provincial Osorno	24	(1)
2001	O'Higgins	30	(0)
2002–2007	Cobresal	168	(8)
2004	→ Colo-Colo (loan)	14	(1)
2007–2008	Cobreloa	32	(0)
2008	Provincial Osorno	23	(0)
2009–2011	Cobresal	69	(1)
2011–2012	Deportes Concepción	22	(0)
2012–2013	Deportes Puerto Montt	22	(0)
Total		618	(11)
- * Club domestic league appearances and goals

Rodrigo Andrés Viligrón Barrientos (born 14 May 1976) is a Chilean former footballer.

== Career ==
Born in Purranque, Viligrón began playing professional football with local side Deportes Puerto Montt in 1992. He led the club to a historic promotion to the Chilean Primera División in 1996. After playing professionally for 20 years, including spells with Provincial Osorno, CD O'Higgins, Cobresal, Colo-Colo, Cobreloa and Deportes Concepción, he retired from playing with his original club, Puerto Montt, in February 2014.

== Post-retirement ==
Viligrón served as coach for football academies in Puerto Montt and has played football at amateur level for clubs such as Alberto Edwards from Fresia.

Following coaching football, Viligrón has worked in salmon industry.
