= Leonardo Díaz (footballer) =

Argentine footballer (born 1972)

Personal information
- Full name: Leonardo Nicolás Díaz
- Date of birth: September 5, 1972 (age 54)
- Place of birth: Santa Fe, Argentina
- Height: 1.84 m (6 ft 1/2 in)
- Position: Goalkeeper

Youth career
- Newell's Old Boys

Senior career*
Years	Team	Apps	(Gls)
1992–1994	Newell's Old Boys	0	(0)
1995–2002	Colón	210	(0)
2002–2003	Independiente	28	(0)
2003	Deportivo Cali	10	(0)
2004	Colón	15	(0)
2005–2006	Municipal	63	(0)
2006–2007	Huracán	40	(0)
2007	AEL Limassol	0	(0)
2008	Deportes Concepción	11	(0)
2009	Al Nasr SC	0	(0)
2009–2010	Boca Unidos	30	(0)
2010–2011	The Strongest	11	(0)
2011	Deportivo Maipú	14	(0)
Total		432	(0)

International career
1991	Argentina U20	3	(0)

Managerial career
- 2013: Huracán (assistant)
- 2013–2014: Colón (assistant)
- 2015–2016: Quilmes (assistant)
- 2017–2018: Cúcuta Deportivo (assistant)
- 2019–2020: Independiente (assistant)
- * Club domestic league appearances and goals

Leonardo Nicolás Díaz (born 6 September 1972 Santa Fe) is a former Argentine association football goalkeeper.

== Career ==
Díaz began his playing career in 1995 with Colón de Santa Fe after leaving Newell's Old Boys. His debut came in a 1–0 away defeat to Gimnasia y Esgrima de Jujuy on 20 August 1995. He went on to make over 200 league appearances for the Santa Fe Club.

Diaz has also played for a number of other teams such as Independiente, Deportivo Cali, CSD Municipal, Huracán and Deportes Concepción.

In 2009, he joined newly promoted Boca Unidos in the Argentine 2nd division. In July 2010 he transferred to Bolivian club The Strongest.

His last club was Deportivo Maipú in 2011.
