= Diego Guidi =

Argentine footballer

Personal information
- Full name: Diego Martín Guidi Pierani
- Date of birth: 17 February 1981 (age 45)
- Place of birth: Villa Ramallo, Buenos Aires, Argentina
- Height: 1.78 m (5 ft 10 in)
- Position: Centre-back

Senior career*
Years	Team	Apps	(Gls)
1999–2002	Gimnasia LP	12	(0)
2003	Universidad de Concepción	43	(2)
2004–2005	Cobreloa	68	(3)
2006	O'Higgins	32	(1)
2007	Everton	29	(0)
2008	Cobresal	36	(2)
2009–2013	Deportes La Serena	112	(7)
2013–2014	Gimnasia y Tiro	15	(0)
2014–2015	Defensores de Belgrano VR	18	(0)
2015–2017	Iberia	28	(1)
Total		393	(16)

Managerial career
- Iberia (youth)
- * Club domestic league appearances and goals

Diego Martín Guidi Pierani (born 17 February 1981) is an Argentine naturalized Chilean retired footballer.

== Career ==
Guidi started his career with Gimnasia La Plata in his homeland. In 2003, he moved to Chile and developed almost all his career in that country playing for clubs such as Universidad de Concepción, Cobreloa, O'Higgins, Deportes La Serena, among others.

He ended his career with Iberia in 2017.

== Post-retirement ==
Guidi graduated as a football coach in Argentina and worked for the Iberia youth system. He also served as sport manager.

He made his home in Los Ángeles, Chile, and started a football academy called "Ruiz Guidi" along with his friend, Diego Ruiz.

== Honours ==
Cobreloa

- Primera División de Chile (1): 2004 Apertura
