= César Vergara =

Chilean footballer (born 1982)

Personal information
- Full name: César Antonio Vergara Mena
- Date of birth: 14 January 1982 (age 44)
- Place of birth: Concepción, Chile
- Height: 1.84 m (6 ft 0 in)
- Position: Defender

Senior career*
Years	Team	Apps	(Gls)
2002–2008	Concepción		
2006	Provincial Osorno		
2006	Rangers		
2004–2005	Unión Española		
2009–2011	Concepción		
2012	Deportes Puerto Montt		
- * Club domestic league appearances and goals as of 21 March 2020

César Vergara (born 14 January 1982) is a Chilean former footballer.

He played for Deportes Puerto Montt.
