= Marcos Millape =

Chilean footballer (born 1976)

Personal information
- Full name: Marcos Andrés Millape Arismendi
- Date of birth: 30 April 1976 (age 50)
- Place of birth: Osorno, Chile
- Height: 1.72 m (5 ft 8 in)
- Position: Midfielder

Team information
- Current team: Vicente Pérez Rosales (manager)

Youth career
- Provincial Osorno

Senior career*
Years	Team	Apps	(Gls)
1997–2001	Provincial Osorno	126	(3)
2002	Deportes Temuco	18	(0)
2002–2004	Colo-Colo	54	(4)
2005	Cobreloa	33	(1)
2006	O'Higgins	16	(1)
2007	Ñublense	39	(4)
2008	Universidad de Concepción	18	(1)
2008	Provincial Osorno	12	(0)
2009	Rangers	31	(1)
2010–2011	Deportes Iquique	38	(0)
2012	Provincial Osorno	19	(0)
Total		404	(15)

Managerial career
- 2012–2017: Provincial Osorno
- 2018–2019: Deportes Iquique (youth)
- 2020–2021: Provincial Osorno
- 2026–: Vicente Pérez Rosales
- * Club domestic league appearances and goals

Marcos Andrés Millape Arismendi (born April 30, 1976) is a Chilean football manager and former footballer.

== Club career ==
Millape ended his career with Provincial Osorno in the 2012 Segunda División Profesional de Chile.

== Managerial career ==
From 2012 to 2017, Millape worked as the manager of Provincial Osorno, returning in 2020 until March 2021. Also, he had a brief term as the manager of Deportes Iquique at under-19 level.

On 8 July 2026, Millape assumed as manager of Vicente Pérez Rosales in the Tercera B.

== Personal life ==
His nickname, Torito (Little Bull), was given by the Chilean play-by-play commentator Claudio Palma, due to the fact that he comes from Osorno, a city which is an important agricultural center well-suited to the breeding of Chilean cattle. Since the nickname was given, Millape began to celebrate his goals making an imitation of a bull.

His son, Marcos Millape Santana, is a footballer from the Provincial Osorno youth ranks.

== Honours ==
=== Player ===
Colo-Colo

- Primera División de Chile (1): 2002 Clausura

Deportes Iquique

- Copa Chile (1): 2010
- Primera B (1): 2010
