= Lucas Palma =

Argentine footballer

Personal information
- Full name: Lucas Leonel Palma
- Date of birth: 5 May 2003 (age 23)
- Place of birth: Concepción, Tucumán, Argentina
- Position: Forward

Team information
- Current team: Boca Juniors
- Number: 54

Senior career*
Years	Team	Apps	(Gls)
2021–	Boca Juniors	1	(0)
- * Club domestic league appearances and goals as of 23:04, 10 August 2021 (UTC)

Lucas Leonel Palma (born 5 May 2003) is an Argentine footballer currently playing as a forward for Boca Juniors.

== Career statistics ==
=== Club ===
As of 10 August 2021.

Club	Season	League			Cup		Continental		Other		Total	
Club	Season	Division	Apps	Goals	Apps	Goals	Apps	Goals	Apps	Goals	Apps	Goals
Boca Juniors	2021	Argentine Primera División	1	0	0	0	–		0	0	1	0
Career total			1	0	0	0	0	0	0	0	1	0
