= Matías Rojas (footballer, born 1989) =

Argentine-born Chilean footballer

Personal information
- Full name: Matías Humberto Rojas
- Date of birth: 9 May 1989 (age 37)
- Place of birth: Buenos Aires, Argentina
- Height: 1.75 m (5 ft 9 in)
- Position: Midfielder

Senior career*
Years	Team	Apps	(Gls)
2008–2010	Ñublense	4	(0)
2010–2011	Naval	35	(3)
2012–2014	Deportes Temuco	23	(5)
2013–2014	→ Deportivo Armenio (loan)		
2014–2015	Deportivo Armenio		
2019	Deportivo Cosmos	3	(1)
2020	Estudiantes Federación	3	(0)
- * Club domestic league appearances and goals

Matías Humberto Rojas (born 9 May 1989) is a former Argentinian–born Chilean footballer who played as a midfielder.

== Career ==
In Chile, Rojas played for Ñublense, Naval, and Deportes Temuco.
