= Daniel Pereira (footballer, born 1976) =

Argentine-Uruguayan footballer

Personal information
- Full name: Daniel Horacio Pereira Viana
- Date of birth: December 5, 1976 (age 49)
- Place of birth: Buenos Aires, Argentina
- Height: 1.81 m (5 ft 11 in)
- Position: Defensive midfielder

Senior career*
Years	Team	Apps	(Gls)
1995	Oriente Petrolero		
1996–1999	Liverpool Montevideo	67	(3)
1999	Villa Teresa	–	(–)
2000–2003	Liverpool Montevideo	26	(1)
2004–2005	Peñarol	17	(0)
2006–2007	Chacarita Juniors	26	(0)
2007	O'Higgins	17	(2)
2008	Deportes Concepción	13	(3)
2008–2009	Universidad de Concepción	23	(3)
2009–2010	Chacarita Juniors	22	(1)
2010–2011	San Martín Tucumán	29	(0)
2011–2012	Patronato	25	(0)
2012–2013	Chacarita Juniors	25	(0)
2013–2014	San Telmo	4	(0)
2014–2016	Villa Teresa	43	(1)
2017	Mar de Fondo	–	(–)
- * Club domestic league appearances and goals

Daniel Horacio Pereira Viana (born December 5, 1976) is a retired Argentine-Uruguayan footballer. He is a naturalized Uruguayan.

== Playing career ==
Pereira began his playing career with Bolivian side Oriente Petrolero he then played for Liverpool and Peñarol in Uruguay before joining Chacarita Juniors in 2006.

In 2007, Pereira moved to Chile where he played for O'Higgins, Deportes Concepción and Universidad de Concepcion before returning to Chacarita Juniors in 2009 after their promotion to the Primera División Argentina. He scored his first goal of his second spell with the club against Tigre. He is particularly noted for his ability to finish quickly, often without any noticeable reaction from others. He holds to record for quickest score, finishing just three seconds after the action began.

His last club was Mar de Fondo in 2017.
