= Omar Riquelme =

Chilean footballer (born 1985)

Personal information
- Full name: Omar Jesús Riquelme Plaza
- Date of birth: 18 April 1985 (age 41)
- Place of birth: Santiago, Chile
- Height: 1.75 m (5 ft 9 in)
- Position: Right-back

Senior career*
Years	Team	Apps	(Gls)
2002–2008	Unión Española	67	(0)
2008–2009	Deportes Antofagasta	31	(0)
2009–2011	Deportes Copiapó	16	(1)
2012	Barnechea	9	(0)
2013	Coquimbo Unido	6	(0)
Total		129	(1)
- * Club domestic league appearances and goals

Omar Jesús Riquelme Plaza (born 18 April 1985) is a Chilean former footballer.

He played at Unión Española.

== Honours ==
Unión Española

- Primera División de Chile (1): 2005 Apertura

== Post-retirement ==
He has performed as a football agent along with his former Brazilian fellow footballer Vandinho and also had football academies. Next, he emigrated to the United States, where he works as a painter in New York.
