= Paolo Vivar =

Chilean footballer

Personal information
- Full name: Paolo César Vivar Araya
- Date of birth: 11 March 1977 (age 49)
- Place of birth: Ovalle, Chile
- Height: 1.81 m (5 ft 11 in)
- Position: Left winger

Youth career
- Deportes Ovalle

Senior career*
Years	Team	Apps	(Gls)
1995–1996	Deportes Ovalle	21	(4)
1997–2001	Cobreloa	101	(23)
2002–2003	Unión San Felipe	13	(3)
2003	Rangers	14	(1)
2004	Persija Jakarta		(2)
2004	Persikota Tangerang		(3)
2005	Persema Malang		(7)
2006–2007	Persela Lamongan		(0)
2008–2009	Cobreloa	2	(0)
Total			(43)

International career
1997	Chile U20		
1998	Chile	1	(0)
1998	Chile B	1	(0)
- * Club domestic league appearances and goals

Paolo César Vivar Araya (born 11 March 1977) is a Chilean former professional footballer who played as a left winger for clubs in Chile and Indonesia.

== Club career ==
A left winger from the Deportes Ovalle youth system, Vivar also could play as a left midfielder or left wing back. He began his career making appearances for the club in the 1995 and the 1996 seasons of the Chilean second division.

In Chile, he also played for Cobreloa, where he had his better seasons, Unión San Felipe and Rangers de Talca.

Abroad, he played in Indonesia for Persija Jakarta, Persikota Tangerang, Persema Malang and Persela Lamongan.

His last club was Cobreloa in 2009.

== International career ==
Vivar represented Chile at under-20 level in the 1997 South American Championship.

At senior level, he made an appearance for the Chile national team in a 1–1 draw versus Iran on 31 January 1998. Previously, he took part in an unofficial match against a team made up by players from the Hong Kong league, with a 3–1 loss. In addition, he played in the 2–1 win for the B-team against England B on 10 February 1998.

== Personal life ==
After his retirement, he switched to the mining industry and has worked as a mechanic and crane operator.
