= Eduardo Navea =

Chilean footballer (born 1987)

Personal information
- Full name: Eduardo Andrés Navea Silva
- Date of birth: 12 August 1987 (age 39)
- Place of birth: Santiago, Chile
- Height: 1.74 m (5 ft 9 in)
- Position: Striker

Youth career
- Escuela Sótero del Río
- Universidad de Chile

Senior career*
Years	Team	Apps	(Gls)
2006–2008	Universidad de Chile	3	(1)
2007	→ Deportes Valdivia (loan)	22	(18)
2008	→ Santiago Wanderers (loan)	29	(2)
2009–2010	Unión Temuco	25	(4)
2011	Deportes Concepción	5	(0)
2012–2017	Iberia	97	(29)
- * Club domestic league appearances and goals

Eduardo Andrés Navea Silva (born 12 August 1987), known as Eduardo Navea, is a Chilean former footballer who played as a striker.

== Post-retirement ==
Retired at the age of 31, Navea joined the Brígida Walker High School based in Ñuñoa in charge of supporting athletes.
