= Robin Melo =

Chilean footballer (born 1987)

Personal information
- Full name: Robin Sandor Melo Cornejo
- Date of birth: 6 March 1987 (age 39)
- Place of birth: Santiago, Chile
- Height: 1.78 m (5 ft 10 in)
- Position: Forward

Senior career*
Years	Team	Apps	(Gls)
2007	Universidad de Chile		
2008	Unión La Calera		
2009–2012	Unión Temuco		
2013–2014	Deportes Temuco		
2014–2016	Deportes La Serena		
- * Club domestic league appearances and goals as of 21 March 2020

Robin Sandor Melo Cornejo (born 6 March 1987) is a Chilean footballer.

He played for Universidad de Chile and his last club was Deportes Temuco.

== Honours ==
=== Club ===
Unión Temuco

- Tercera División de Chile (1): 2009
