= Roberto Cáceres =

Chilean footballer (born 1978)

Personal information
- Full name: Roberto Enrique Cáceres Torrealba
- Date of birth: 25 May 1978 (age 48)
- Place of birth: Santiago, Chile
- Height: 1.81 m (5 ft 11 1/2 in)
- Position: Defender

Senior career*
Years	Team	Apps	(Gls)
2002–2004	Universidad de Chile	15	(0)
2000	→ Deportes Concepción (loan)		
2001	→ Deportes Temuco (loan)		
2005–2006	Cruz Azul Oaxaca	56	(3)
2006–2007	Cruz Azul Hidalgo	32	(2)
2007–2011	Lobos BUAP	68	(1)
2007	→ Palestino (loan)	12	(2)
2008	→ O'Higgins (loan)	18	(1)
2012	Trasandino	–	(–)
2013–2014	Deportes Linares	16	(2)
2014–2015	Deportes Valdivia	21	(2)
- * Club domestic league appearances and goals

Roberto Enrique Cáceres Torrealba (born 25 May 1978) is a Chilean former footballer who played as a defender.

He played for O'Higgins, on loan from Lobos de la BUAP, in 2008. In 2015, he played his final season with Valdivia, before retiring from professional football.

== Teams ==
=== Player ===
Universidad de Chile

- Primera División de Chile (1): 2004 Apertura
