= Renzo Yáñez =

Chilean footballer and manager (born 1980)

Personal information
- Full name: Renzo Alberto Yáñez Adasme
- Date of birth: 5 June 1980 (age 46)
- Place of birth: Santa Cruz, Chile
- Height: 1.70 m (5 ft 7 in)
- Position: Striker

Youth career
- 1998: Deportes Santa Cruz
- 1999: Universidad de Chile

Senior career*
Years	Team	Apps	(Gls)
1999–2002	Universidad de Chile	15	(4)
2002	→ Universidad de Concepción (loan)	32	(18)
2003–2004	Universidad de Concepción	26	(5)
2005	Cobresal	30	(11)
2006–2007	Huachipato	62	(16)
2008–2009	Audax Italiano	39	(14)
2010	Santiago Morning	14	(1)
2010	Deportes Concepción	15	(2)
2011	San Marcos	5	(1)
2012	Curicó Unido	0	(0)
Total		238	(72)

Managerial career
- 2014–2021: Deportes Santa Cruz (assistant)
- 2019–2021: Deportes Santa Cruz (youth)
- 2021: Deportes Santa Cruz (caretaker)
- * Club domestic league appearances and goals

Renzo Alberto Yáñez Adasme (born 5 June 1980) is a Chilean football manager and former footballer who played as a striker.

== Playing career ==
=== Early years ===
Yáñez joined Deportes Santa Cruz youth ranks in January 1998, aged 18. After six months playing in Santa Cruz, he was scouted by an agent of Chilean Primera División powerhouse Universidad de Chile. In his first season with the club, Yáñez was part of the team champion of the league, being this his first professional honour. The next season, he earned again the league title and now the 2000 Copa Chile. In 2002, Yáñez was loaned to Universidad de Concepción, due to his lack of opportunities and action.

During his spell here, Renzo helped to win the Primera B title, being a key player in the season, scoring 18 goals in 32 games. After a season in Universidad de Chile with few action, he returned to Universidad de Concepción in January 2003. During his second spell at U. de Conce, Yáñez scored 5 goals in 26 matches.

=== Cobresal ===
In 2005, Yáñez joined to Cobresal.

=== Huachipato ===
In January 2006, Huachipato signed him for the 2006 Apertura Tournament.

Debut in Huachipato: vs. Antofagasta 2–0 home win (28/01/2006) First goal in Huachipato: vs. Colo-Colo 2–0 away win. (05/12/2006) Second goal in Huachipato: vs. Universidad de Chile 2–0 home win (01/04/2006)

http://www.emol.com/noticias/deportes/2007/05/12/255674/con-tripleta-de-renzo-yanez-huachipato-quedo-mas-cerca-de-la-sudamericana.html 12 May 2007

http://www.emol.com/noticias/deportes/2007/10/28/280071/con-goles-de-renzo-yanez-huachipato-derrota-a-la-u-de-concepcion.html 27 October 2007

=== Audax Italiano ===
On 21 December 2007, Yáñez abandoned Huachipato for join to Audax Italiano signing a two-year contract, for the 2008 Apertura Tournament and in the 2008 Copa Libertadores. He made his debut against Deportes La Serena on 2 January 2008, playing 24 minutes of game, in a 0–0 draw after of replace to Renato Ramos in the 66th minute. On 22 February, Renzo scored a hat-trick in a 4–1 victory over his former team Cobresal, of this form winning the titularity very quickly. Yáñez again scored on 15 March, in a 3–1 win over Universidad Católica, scoring the second in the 19th minute. Weeks later, on 30 March, he incremented his tally goal against Palestino in a match that Audax won 2–1. In his first tournament with the club, Yáñez scored 7 goals in 16 games during the 2008 Apertura Tournament.

Yáñez started the 2008 Clausura Tournament with a goal in a 1–1 draw against Deportes La Serena. After weeks without score, on 23 August, he scored his side's goal in a 2–1 defeat with Provincial Osorno in the 75th minute, in the 11 matchday. The next matchday of the Clausura against Universidad Católica, Renzo netted a twice in a 4–2 away win at San Carlos de Apoquindo Stadium in the 61st minute and in the 90th minute. On 27 September, he continued scoring goals, now against O'Higgins, being the only of game in a 1–0 home victory. On 25 October, he scored his thirteenth official goal for Audax in a 5–3 win over Santiago Morning.

== Managerial career ==
From 2014 he has sporadically worked as assistant coach of Deportes Santa Cruz, reaching to manage the First Team in 2021 as a caretaker. In addition, he is the manager of the Youth Team from 2019.

== Honours ==
Universidad de Chile

- Primera División: 1999, 2000
- Copa Chile: 2000

Universidad de Concepción

- Copa Libertadores' Chilean liguilla: 2003
