= Patricio Rubina =

Chilean footballer (born 1981)

Personal information
- Full name: Patricio Rubina
- Date of birth: 22 June 1981 (age 45)
- Place of birth: La Serena, Chile
- Height: 1.80 m (5 ft 11 in)
- Position: Midfielder

Senior career*
Years	Team	Apps	(Gls)
2004–2017	Deportes La Serena	229	(17)
2006	→ Cobreloa (loan)	18	(1)
2008	→ Universidad de Concepción (loan)	10	(0)
2011–2013	→ Antofagasta (loan)	76	(3)
2015–2016	→ Colchagua (loan)	33	(0)
- * Club domestic league appearances and goals

Patricio Rubina (born 22 June 1981) is a Chilean former footballer who played as a midfielder.

== Honours ==
=== Player ===
Deportes Antofagasta

- Primera B (1): 2011 Apertura
