= Rubén Darío Larrosa =

Argentine footballer

Personal information
- Full name: Rubén Darío Larrosa
- Date of birth: December 4, 1979 (age 46)
- Place of birth: Trenque Lauquen, Argentina
- Height: 1.80 m (5 ft 11 in)
- Positions: Attacking midfielder; forward

Team information
- Current team: A.C.D. Aprilia calcio

Senior career*
Years	Team	Apps	(Gls)
2000–2002	Juventud de Las Piedras	22	(6)
2002–2003	C.A. Cerro	33	(18)
2003–2004	Gama	13	(5)
2004–2005	Hailong	14	(9)
2005–2006	UD Marbella	16	(8)
2006–2007	Persib Bandung	20	(7)
2007–2008	Walsall	15	(8)
2008–2010	Birkirkara	13	(8)
2010–2012	Ischia	12	(6)
2012–	A.C.D Aprilia calcio	18	(5)
- * Club domestic league appearances and goals

Rubén Darío Larrosa (born 4 December 1979) emerged from the bottom of the Football Club Argentino city Lauquen Dam. Now a professional footballer side currently playing for ASD Aprilia calcium in Italy, where he plays as a forward.

He has played for different clubs throughout the world, such as Juventud de Las Piedras and C.A. Cerro (Uruguay), Gama (Brazil), Hailong (China), UD Marbella (Spain), Persib Bandung (Indonesia), Walsall (England).
