= Diego Casamán =

Uruguayan footballer (born 1990)

Personal information
- Full name: Diego Andrés Casamán Ortega
- Date of birth: March 10, 1990 (age 36)
- Place of birth: Montevideo, Uruguay
- Height: 1.81 m (5 ft 11 in)
- Position: Midfielder

Senior career*
Years	Team	Apps	(Gls)
2006–2007	Peñarol	1	(0)
2007–2008	Villa Española	16	(1)
2008	→ Provincial Osorno (loan)	8	(0)
2009–2010	Newell's Old Boys	0	(0)
2010–2011	Rocha	13	(1)
2011	Rentistas	5	(0)
2012	Cerrito	1	(0)
- * Club domestic league appearances and goals

Diego Andrés Casamán Ortega (born March 10, 1990, in Montevideo) is a former Uruguayan footballer who played as a midfielder.

== Teams ==
- (Uruguay) Peñarol 2006–07
- (Uruguay) Villa Española 2007
- (Chile) Provincial Osorno 2008
- (Uruguay) Villa Española 2008
- (Argentina) Newell's Old Boys 2009–10
- (Uruguay) Rocha 2010–11
- (Uruguay) Rentistas 2011
