= Gonzalo Sepúlveda =

Chilean footballer (born 1988)

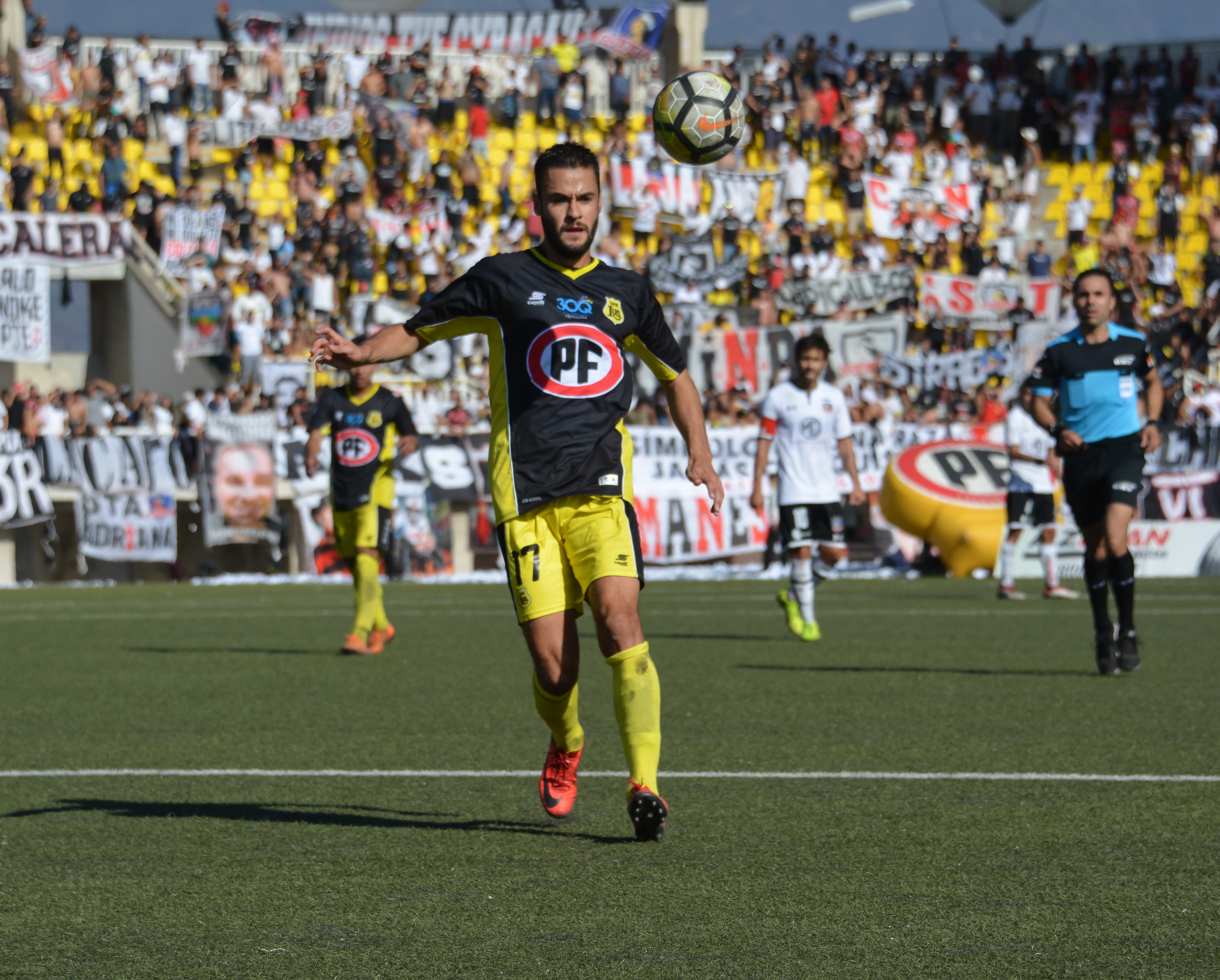

Personal information
- Full name: Gonzalo Alfredo Sepúlveda Domínguez
- Date of birth: 10 November 1988 (age 38)
- Place of birth: Santiago, Chile
- Height: 1.80 m (5 ft 11 in)
- Position: Midfielder

Youth career
- 2000–2007: Universidad Católica

Senior career*
Years	Team	Apps	(Gls)
2007–2015	Universidad Católica	53	(0)
2008	→ Provincial Osorno (loan)	9	(0)
2008	→ Kitchee (loan)	–	(–)
2015	→ Ñublense (loan)	3	(0)
2015–2016	Unión La Calera	18	(0)
2016–2018	San Luis	21	(0)
2019	Deportes Puerto Montt	19	(0)
Total		123	(0)
- * Club domestic league appearances and goals

Gonzalo Alfredo Sepúlveda Domínguez (born 10 November 1988) is a Chilean former footballer who played as a midfielder.

== Honours ==
=== Club ===
Universidad Católica

- Primera División de Chile (1): 2010
- Copa Chile (1): 2011
