= Héctor Suazo =

Chilean football player (born 1978)

Personal information
- Full name: Héctor Alejandro Suazo Inarejo
- Date of birth: 17 April 1978 (age 48)
- Place of birth: Avellaneda, Buenos Aires, Argentina
- Height: 1.76 m (5 ft 9 in)
- Position: Forward

Senior career*
Years	Team	Apps	(Gls)
1999	Trasandino	–	(–)
2000–2006	Universidad de Chile	22	(6)
2002	→ Deportes Temuco (loan)	12	(2)
2003	→ Deportes La Serena (loan)		(8)
2004	→ Everton (loan)	30	(12)
2005–2006	→ Palestino (loan)	26	(7)
2007	Unión Española	18	(1)
2008	Deportes Antofagasta	18	(5)
2008	San Luis		(6)
2009	Lota Schwager	16	(8)
2009	Deportes Concepción	15	(5)
2010	La Piedad	7	(2)
2010	Curicó Unido	14	(4)
2011–2012	Deportivo Zacapa	13	(4)
2012	Deportes Quilicura	–	(–)
Total			(70)
- * Club domestic league appearances and goals

Héctor Alejandro Suazo Inarejo (born 17 April 1978) is an Argentine-born Chilean former professional footballer who played as a forward.

== Career ==
In 2000, Suazo was part of Universidad de Chile's team who helped the club to win its 11th title. One of his first goals in the club was in a derby against Colo-Colo for a friendly match.

On 26 July 2006, he suffered a serious injury playing for Universidad de Chile.

In 2009, Suazo joined to Lota Schwager. During his spell in these club, he is remembered for a chip goal to Provincial Osorno in a 3–2 away victory at Rubén Marcos Peralta Municipal Stadium. Then, he moved to Curicó Unido.

In 2010, he played for Mexican second-tier club Reboceros De La Piedad.

== Personal life ==
He was born in Avellaneda, Buenos Aires, Argentina, and naturalized Chilean.

He is better known by his nickname Galleta (Cookie).

He participated in 2019–20 Chilean protests.

On 15 June 2020, it was reported that he tested positive for COVID-19.

== After football ==
Suazo has worked as a football agent alongside Sergio Gioino and Pablo Leclerc.

== Honours ==
Universidad de Chile

- Primera División de Chile: 2000, 2004 Apertura
- Copa Chile: 2000
