= Gustavo Semino =

Argentine footballer

Personal information
- Full name: Gustavo Adrián Semino
- Date of birth: 7 July 1977 (age 49)
- Place of birth: Vicente López, Buenos Aires, Argentina
- Height: 1.83 m (6 ft 0 in)
- Position: Defender

Youth career
- Atlético Rafaela

Senior career*
Years	Team	Apps	(Gls)
1996–2007	Atlético Rafaela	139	(13)
1997–1998	→ Unión Santa Fe (loan)	8	(1)
1999–2000	→ Platense (loan)	23	(2)
2002–2003	→ Rangers (loan)	67	(9)
2005–2007	→ Gimnasia LP (loan)	30	(0)
2008	Huachipato	9	(0)
2008	Unión La Calera	21	(3)
2009	Tacuarembó	21	(0)
2010–2012	Crucero del Norte	51	(3)
2012–2013	Guaraní Antonio Franco	14	(0)
2013–2014	Ex Alumnos 185 de Oberá	9	(1)
2014–2015	Huracán de Goya	4	(0)
2016	Tacuarembó	4	(0)
Total		400	(32)

Managerial career
- Club Athletic FBC (youth)
- 2024–: Atlético Rafaela (youth)
- * Club domestic league appearances and goals

Gustavo Adrián Semino (born July 7, 1977) is a former Argentine footballer who played as a defender.

== Coaching career ==
Following his retirement, Semino moved to Paraguay and played friendly matches with Club Athletic FBC from Encarnación, at the same time he performed as coach of the youth teams. Semino has also worked for a football academy as coach and scout. Strongly related to Atlético Rafaela, he assumed as coach for youth teams in 2024.
