= Gerardo Cortés =

Chilean footballer (born 1988)

Personal information
- Full name: Gerardo Elías Cortés Hermosilla
- Date of birth: 17 May 1988 (age 38)
- Place of birth: Concepción, Chile
- Height: 1.69 m (5 ft 6 1/2 in)
- Position: Attacking midfielder

Youth career
- 2001–2004: Deportes Concepción

Senior career*
Years	Team	Apps	(Gls)
2004–2008	Deportes Concepción	64	(13)
2006	→ Ñublense (loan)	24	(3)
2008–2009	Colo-Colo	13	(1)
2008	→ Unión Española (loan)	21	(8)
2010–2011	Palestino	64	(7)
2012	Deportes Concepción	6	(0)
2013	San Marcos	8	(0)
2014	Deportes La Serena	10	(0)
2014–2017	Santiago Morning	48	(4)
2017	Coquimbo Unido	5	(0)
2018	Deportes Melipilla	5	(1)
2020	Colchagua	16	(0)
2021	San Antonio Unido	4	(0)
2022	Barnechea	2	(0)
2023	Unión San Felipe	2	(0)
Total		292	(37)

International career
2004	Chile U16	4	(0)
2005	Chile U17	6	(1)
2007	Chile U20	10	(4)
2008	Chile U23	4	(0)
- * Club domestic league appearances and goals

Gerardo Elías Cortés Hermosilla (born 17 May 1988) is a Chilean former footballer who played as an attacking midfielder.

== Clu career ==
In April 2021, Cortés joined San Antonio Unido.

His last club was Unión San Felipe in 2023.

== Coaching career ==
In 2026, Cortés started a Unión Española football academy in San Joaquín commune, Santiago de Chile.

== Honours ==
Colo-Colo

- Primera División de Chile (1): 2009 Clausura

Chile U20

- FIFA U20 World Cup (1): Third place 2007
