= Norberto Arrieta =

Argentine footballer

Personal information
- Full name: Norberto Arrieta
- Date of birth: 23 February 1981 (age 45)
- Place of birth: Buenos Aires, Argentina
- Height: 1.72 m (5 ft 8 in)
- Position: Midfielder

Senior career*
Years	Team	Apps	(Gls)
1998–2003	Deportivo Español	4	(0)
2004–2007	Almirante Brown	30	(0)
2008	Deportes Melipilla	13	(2)
2009–2010	Talleres Re	6	(0)
- * Club domestic league appearances and goals

Norberto Arrieta (born 23 February 1981) is an Argentine former footballer who played as a midfielder.

== Career ==
In his homeland, Arrieta played for Deportivo Español, Almirante Brown and Talleres de Remedios de Escalada, his last club.

Abroad, he had a stint with Deportes Melipilla in the Chilean Primera División.
