= José Carlos Burgos =

Paraguayan footballer (born 1983)

Personal information
- Full name: José Carlos Burgos Aquino
- Date of birth: 16 June 1983 (age 43)
- Place of birth: Asunción, Paraguay
- Height: 1.86 m (6 ft 1 in)
- Position: Forward

Senior career*
Years	Team	Apps	(Gls)
2005–2007	Nacional	38	(3)
2006–2007	12 de Octubre	21	(6)
2008	Huachipato	19	(2)
2009	Concepción	8	(0)
2010	Guaraní	7	(2)
2011	3 de Febrero	13	(3)
2010	Imbabura	11	(2)
2011–2012	Macará	14	(3)
2012–2013	Sportivo Luqueño	16	(1)
Total		147	(22)
- * Club domestic league appearances and goals

José Carlos Burgos Aquino (born 16 June 1983) was a Paraguayan former professional footballer who played as a forward.

== Honours ==
Guaraní

- Paraguayan Primera División: 2010 Apertura
