= Jaison Ibarrola =

Paraguayan footballer (born 1986)

Personal information
- Full name: Jaison David Ibarrola Silva
- Date of birth: 10 September 1986 (age 40)
- Place of birth: Asunción, Paraguay
- Height: 1.72 m (5 ft 8 in)
- Position: Striker

Youth career
- 1997–2003: Fernando de la Mora
- 2004–2006: Rubio Ñú

Senior career*
Years	Team	Apps	(Gls)
2007	Concepción	34	(13)
2008	U. de Concepción	8	(0)
2008–2009	Universidad Católica	28	(7)
2009–2010	Táchira	17	(4)
2010	Sportivo Luqueño	5	(0)
2011	Concepción	13	(0)
2011–2012	Millonarios	6	(0)
- * Club domestic league appearances and goals as of 16 February 2013

Jaison David Ibarrola Silva (Spanish pronunciation: [ˈxajson iβaˈrola], born 10 September 1986) is a Paraguayan footballer.

== Career ==
Ibarrola began his career with the second division Paraguayan team Fernando de la Mora in 2005. The following year, he played for Club Nacional.

In 2007, Ibarrola moved to Chile to play for Deportes Concepción, and was transferred to Universidad Católica for the 2008 season.

== Honours ==
=== Club ===
Millonarios

- Copa Colombia (1): 2011
