= Gustavo Tejería =

Uruguayan footballer (born 1981)

Personal information
- Full name: Gustavo Gabriel Tejería
- Date of birth: 30 January 1981 (age 45)
- Place of birth: Paysandú, Uruguay
- Height: 1.78 m (5 ft 10 in)
- Position: Midfielder

Senior career*
Years	Team	Apps	(Gls)
2003–2006	Paysandú	47	(9)
2006	Rampla Juniors	11	(1)
2007	Cerro Largo	14	(1)
2008	Everton	2	(0)
2008	Atenas	11	(0)
2009–2010	Plaza Colonia	18	(3)
2010–2011	Cerrito	17	(0)
- * Club domestic league appearances and goals as of 19 March 2020

Gustavo Gabriel Tejería (born 30 January 1981) was an Uruguayan footballer.

He was part of Chilean side Everton's 2008 Torneo Apertura winner squad.

== Honours ==
=== Club ===
Everton

- Primera División de Chile (1): 2008 Apertura
