= César Reyes =

Chilean footballer (born 1988)

Personal information
- Full name: César Alejandro Reyes Muñoz
- Date of birth: June 22, 1988 (age 38)
- Place of birth: Santiago, Chile
- Height: 1.78 m (5 ft 10 in)
- Position: Forward

Team information
- Current team: Naval
- Number: 9

Youth career
- 2000–2006: Colo-Colo

Senior career*
Years	Team	Apps	(Gls)
2006–2007	Colo-Colo	3	(0)
2008–2009	Deportes Concepción		
2008	→ Deportes Antofagasta (loan)		
2009–present	Naval	25	(0)
- * Club domestic league appearances and goals as of 21:47, 5 February 2010 (UTC)

César Alejandro Reyes Muñoz (born June 22, 1988) is a Chilean footballer who plays for Naval.

Reyes began his playing career with Colo-Colo where he joined the youth ranks in 2000 and made his professional debut in 2006 versus Santiago Wanderers.

== Honours ==
=== Club ===
Colo-Colo

- Primera División de Chile (3): 2006 Clausura, 2007 Apertura, 2007 Clausura
