= Nahuel Jiménez =

Argentine footballer

Nahuel Pulitano Jiménez
Personal information
- Full name: Nahuel Pulitano Jiménez
- Date of birth: 15 August 1987 (age 39)
- Place of birth: Buenos Aires, Argentina
- Position: Midfielder

Senior career*
Years	Team	Apps	(Gls)
2006–2007	Independiente		
2008	Rangers		
2008–2009	Platense		
2009–2010	Varese		
2010–2012	Città di Marino		
2012–2013	Valletta F.C.		
2013–2015	CF Mérida		
2015	Sportivo Italiano		
- * Club domestic league appearances and goals

Nahuel Pulitano Jiménez (born 15 August 1987 in Buenos Aires, Argentina) is an Argentine former professional footballer who played as a midfielder.

== Clubs ==
- Independiente 2006–2007
- Rangers 2008
- Platense 2008–2009
- Varese 2009–2010
- Città di Marino 2010–2012
- Valletta F.C. 2012–2013
- CF Mérida 2013–2015
- Sportivo Italiano 2015
