= Luis Godoy (footballer) =

Chilean footballer (born 1978)

Personal information
- Full name: Luis Leonardo Godoy Pizarro
- Date of birth: 14 May 1978 (age 48)
- Place of birth: La Ligua, Chile
- Height: 1.78 m (5 ft 10 in)
- Position: Goalkeeper

Senior career*
Years	Team	Apps	(Gls)
1996–2004	Cobreloa	6	(0)
2002–2003	→ Antofagasta (loan)	–	(–)
2005–2006	Antofagasta	40	(0)
2007	Cobreloa	5	(0)
2008–2009	Cobresal	0	(0)
2009	Unión La Calera	24	(0)
2010–2014	Deportes Antofagasta	10	(0)
- * Club domestic league appearances and goals as of 18 March 2020

Luis Leonardo Godoy Pizarro (born 14 May 1978) was a Chilean footballer.

He currently playing for clubs like Cobreloa or Deportes Antofagasta.

== Honours ==
=== Player ===
Deportes Antofagasta

- Primera B (1): 2011 Apertura
