= Gustavo Savoia =

Argentine footballer

Personal information
- Full name: Gustavo Humberto Savoia
- Date of birth: 21 August 1981 (age 45)
- Place of birth: Reconquista, Argentina
- Height: 1.85 m (6 ft 1 in)
- Position: Striker

Team information
- Current team: Mitre

Senior career*
| Years | Team | Apps | (Gls) |
| 2003–2004 | Colón | 18 | (2) |
| 2004 | Universitario | | |
| 2005 | Gimnasia (LP) | 11 | (1) |
| 2005–2006 | Olimpo | 12 | (0) |
| 2007 | Tolima | 6 | (1) |
| 2007 | Olmedo | | |
| 2008 | Cobreloa | 25 | (20) |
| 2009 | Ponte Preta | 3 | (0) |
| 2009 | Córdoba CF | 13 | (1) |
| 2010–2011 | CD Atlético Baleares | 16 | (1) |
| 2011 | Deportes Concepción | 10 | (0) |
| 2012 | XV de Piracicaba | | |
| 2012 | Fortaleza | | |
| 2012– | Mitre | | |
- * Club domestic league appearances and goals as of May 18, 2013

Gustavo Humberto Savoia (born 21 August 1981 in Reconquista, Santa Fe) is an Argentine striker who currently plays for the Club Atlético Mitre. He is nicknamed El Potro.
