= Lucas Suárez (footballer, born 1984) =

Argentine footballer

Personal information
- Full name: Lucas Daniel Suárez
- Date of birth: 8 February 1984 (age 42)
- Place of birth: Marcos Juárez, Argentina
- Height: 1.90 m (6 ft 3 in)
- Position: Goalkeeper

Senior career*
Years	Team	Apps	(Gls)
2004–2006	Newell's Old Boys	0	(0)
2006	Gimnasia de Mendoza		
2007	Tacuarembó	31	(0)
2008–2009	Audax Italiano	6	(0)
2010–2012	Argentino MJ	–	(–)
2013–2016	San Martín MB	–	(–)
2017–2021	Lambert	–	(–)
2022	Olimpo de Laborde	–	(–)
- * Club domestic league appearances and goals

Lucas Daniel Suárez (born 8 February 1984) is an Argentine footballer.

== Club career ==
=== Early career ===
Suárez began his career in 2004 with Rosario club Newell's Old Boys, where he played at the reserves team during his spell at Newell's. Two years later, he moved to amateur side of fourth division Gimnasia y Esgrima de Mendoza. In 2007, Suárez signed by Uruguayan club Tacuarembó.

=== Audax Italiano ===
Suárez signed for Audax Italiano in January 2008, and contested the post of starter keeper with the Paraguayan Mario Villasanti. On 14 April, he made his Chilean Primera División debut in a 3–0 away win over Deportes Antofagasta, for the fifteenth match day of the Apertura Tournament. Due to his good performance against Antofagasta, coach Raúl Toro played him in the next match against Universidad de Chile in a 2–0 away loss. After his first two games for the club, he started in a 2–1 home win over Cobreloa and in a 3–0 away win over Everton for the first leg of the playoffs quarterfinals. In the second leg of the playoffs, he was seen as responsible for the elimination of Audax, after his start in a 4–1 loss. After his debut tournament, throughout the 2008 season and into his second year with Audax, he was third choice to Johnny Herrera and Villasanti. Suárez made his last appearance for the club in the 2009 Apertura Tournament, in a 4–1 home defeat to Universidad de Chile. In December of that year, he left Audax, because his opportunities in the team were limited. At league level, he made six appearances.

=== Back in Argentina ===
In 2010, Suárez returned to his homeland and signed with Argentino de Marcos Juárez. Later, he played for San Martín de Monte Buey.

In 2022, Suárez joined Olimpo de Laborde from Lambert in the Liga Beccar Varela.
