= Rubén Aguilera =

Paraguayan footballer (born 1978)

Personal information
- Full name: Rubén Darío Aguilea
- Date of birth: 26 January 1978 (age 48)
- Place of birth: Pedro Juan Caballero, Paraguay
- Height: 1.80 m (5 ft 11 in)
- Position: Defender

Senior career*
Years	Team	Apps	(Gls)
2000–2002	Guaraní		
2003	1º de Mayo de Beni		
2004	12 de Octubre		
2005	San José		
2006	2 de Mayo		
2006	The Strongest		
2007	Real Potosí		
2008	Antofagasta		
2008	Silvio Pettirossi		
2009–2010	General Caballero ZC		
- * Club domestic league appearances and goals as of 20 March 2020

Rubén Darío Aguilera (born 26 January 1978) is a Paraguayan footballer.

He played for Deportes Antofagasta.

== Honours ==
=== Player ===
General Caballero

- Paraguayan Segunda División (1): 2010 División Intermedia
