= Ezequiel Miralles =

Argentine footballer

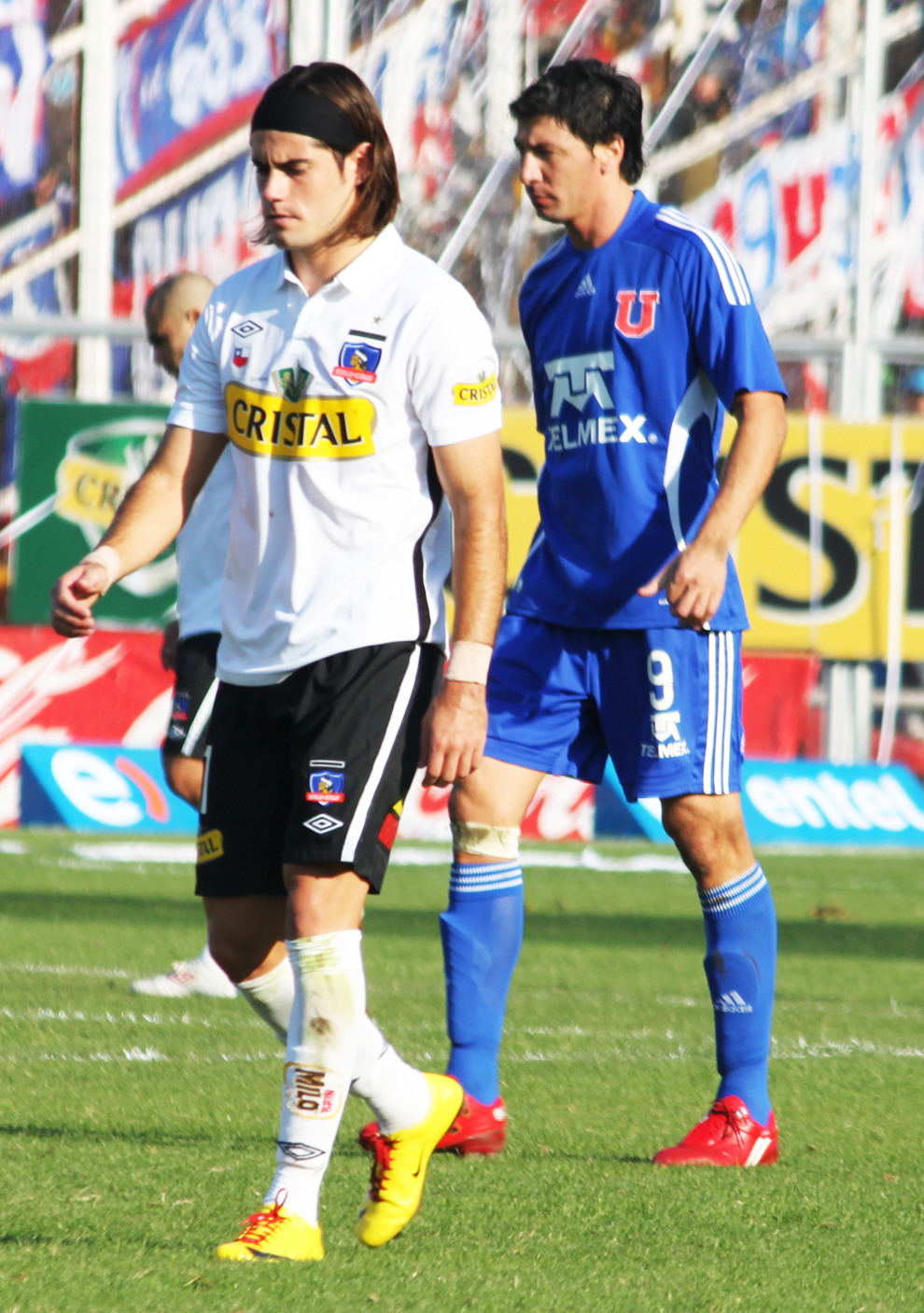
- Miralles (left) while playing for Colo-Colo

Personal information
- Full name: Ezequiel Nicolás Miralles Sabugo
- Date of birth: 21 July 1983 (age 43)
- Place of birth: Bahía Blanca, Argentina
- Height: 1.76 m (5 ft 9 in)
- Position: Striker

Senior career*
Years	Team	Apps	(Gls)
2003–2004	Tres Arroyos	24	(3)
2004–2005	Ferro	30	(6)
2005–2006	Defensa y Justicia	25	(6)
2006–2007	Racing Club	6	(0)
2007	Talleres de Córdoba	11	(3)
2008–2009	Everton	58	(27)
2009–2011	Colo-Colo	51	(32)
2011–2012	Grêmio	29	(4)
2012–2013	Santos	16	(6)
2013	Atlante	10	(1)
2014	Olimpo	12	(2)
2014–2015	Everton	19	(6)
2015–2016	Huracán	18	(0)
2017–2018	Liniers	0	(0)
- * Club domestic league appearances and goals as of 28 December 2016

Ezequiel Nicolás Miralles Sabugo (Spanish pronunciation: [eθeˈkjel miˈɾaʎes], born 21 July 1983) is an Argentine footballer that currently plays for Liniers as a striker.

== Club career ==
He began his football career at Huracán de Tres Arroyos of the second tier of his country, where he scored 3 goals in 24 appearances during one season, and also earned the Primera B title. In June 2006, after successful spells at Ferro Carril Oeste and Defensa y Justicia, Miralles joined to Argentine Primera División powerhouse club Racing Club de Avellaneda. After a regular pass Racing, in which he failed to score goals in six games, he moved to Talleres de Córdoba.

In January 2008, he traveled to Chile and signed for Chilean Primera División club Everton. In his first tournament, the Apertura Tournament of that year, Miralles won his first title in the Chilean football, after of defeat to Colo-Colo at the Sausalito Stadium. After two successful seasons at the club of Viña del Mar, in where scored 13 goals in 29 games, on 2 June 2009, was sold to Colo-Colo for a US$1.2 transfer fee, club that lost the final with Everton in the 2008 Apertura Tournament. He debuted in an historic game against Eastern Island, that his club won 4–0 and his first goal came on 22 August against O'Higgins in a 2–2 away draw after a notable free kick in the last minute of game. He earned his first title with Colo-Colo, the Clausura Tournament, in where he netted 11 goals in 16 games. In the next year, Miralles was the key player of his club in a regular 2010 season, scoring thirteen goals in 22 appearances, in a season in which the team had two coaches Hugo Tocalli and Diego Cagna. In the next season, Miralles had a regular performance in the 2011 season, but was the team's goalscorer with eight just one goal over Esteban Paredes that had six goals. On 21 May 2011, Colo-Colo accepted a US$2.4 million bid to the Brazilian Série A club Grêmio, being confirmed that he joined to the club of Porto Alegre when the Apertura ends.

After his successful incorporation to Grêmio, Miralles debuted for the seventh week of the 2011 Campeonato Brasileiro Série A in a 2–2 home draw with Avaí and his first goal came on 27 July against America (MG), in a 1–1 draw. Because his lack of opportunities, he expressed that would leave the club at the end of season.

On 6 July 2012, Miralles signed for Santos FC, after a swap for Elano. Despite being a regular in Santos' squad, he left the club a year later, joining Atlante.

== Career statistics ==
(Correct as of 23 November 2023)

Club	Season	State League		National League		Cup		Libertadores		Other		Total	
Club	Season	Apps	Goals	Apps	Goals	Apps	Goals	Apps	Goals	Apps	Goals	Apps	Goals
Tres Arroyos	2003–04	—		23	4	—		—		—		23	4
Total		—		23	4	—		—		—		23	4
Ferro Carril	2004–05	—		30	6	—		—		—		30	6
Total		—		30	6	—		—		—		30	6
Defensa y Justicia	2005–06	—		25	6	—		—		—		25	6
Total		—		25	6	—		—		—		25	6
Racing	2006–07	—		6	0	—		—		—		6	0
Total		—		6	0	—		—		—		6	0
Talleres	2006–07	—		11	3	—		—		—		11	3
Total		—		11	3	—		—		—		11	3
Everton	2008	—		35	17	—		—		—		35	17
Everton	2009	—		17	8	—		6	2	—		23	10
Total		—		52	25	—		6	2	—		58	27
Colo-Colo	2009	—		16	11	—		—		—		16	11
Colo-Colo	2010	—		22	14	—		5	3	1	0	28	17
Colo-Colo	2011	—		13	7	—		6	3	—		19	10
Total		—		51	32	—		11	6	1	0	63	38
Grêmio	2011	—		19	2	—		—		—		19	2
Grêmio	2012	5	1	5	1	5	2	—		—		15	4
Total		5	1	24	3	5	2	—		—		34	6
Santos	2012	—		16	6	—		—		2	0	18	6
Santos	2013	13	5	—		2	0	—		—		15	5
Total		13	5	16	6	2	0	—		2	0	33	11
Atlante	2013	—		10	1	—		—		—		10	1
Total		0	0	10	1	0	0	—		0	0	10	1
Olimpo	2013–14	—		12	2	—		—		—		12	2
Total		0	0	12	2	0	0	—		0	0	12	2
Everton	2014–15	—		19	6	—		—		—		19	6
Total		0	0	19	6	0	0	—		0	0	19	6
Huracán	2015	—		8	0	—		—		3	0	11	0
Huracán	2016	—		10	0	—		8	1	1	0	19	1
Total		0	0	18	0	0	0	8	1	4	0	30	1

== Honours ==
=== Club ===
Talleres de Córdoba

- Primera B (1): 2004

Everton

- Primera División de Chile (1): 2008 Apertura

Colo-Colo

- Primera División de Chile (1): 2009 Clausura

Santos

- Recopa Sudamericana (1): 2012
