= Jaime Riveros =

Chilean footballer (born 1970)

Personal information
- Full name: Jaime Eduardo Riveros Valenzuela
- Date of birth: 27 November 1970 (age 55)
- Place of birth: Quinta de Tilcoco, Chile
- Height: 1.64 m (5 ft 5 in)
- Position: Attacking midfielder

Youth career
- O'Higgins

Senior career*
Years	Team	Apps	(Gls)
1992–1994	O'Higgins	46	(7)
1992	→ D. Santa Cruz (loan)	24	(6)
1995–2000	Cobreloa	175	(74)
2001–2004	Santiago Wanderers	135	(44)
2005	Universidad de Chile	16	(2)
2005	Deportivo Cali	10	(1)
2006	Santiago Wanderers	15	(1)
2006–2007	Huachipato	52	(20)
2008–2009	Everton	71	(19)
2010	Unión Temuco	16	(4)
2010–2011	Palestino	45	(2)

International career
1997–2001	Chile	14	(4)

Managerial career
- 2014: Deportes Santa Cruz
- * Club domestic league appearances and goals

Jaime Eduardo Riveros Valenzuela (Spanish pronunciation: [ˈxajme riˈβeɾos], born 27 November 1970) is a Chilean former professional footballer who played as an attacking midfielder.

== Club career ==
=== Background ===
He began his career in 1992 at Rancagua side O'Higgins, near Quinta de Tilcoco, town where Riveros was born. In his first full season, he was loaned to Deportes Santa Cruz on a season long deal. After impressing at second-tier club, he returned to O'Higgins the next season and broke into Manuel Pellegrini´s starting lineup in 1993.

In 1995, he joined Cobreloa, where he played the Copa CONMEBOL in his first season. He had a good performance because he played all four games of his team for the contest, and scored two goals in the two leg matches against Ciclista Lima, first scoring his side's goal in the 1–4 away loss at Lima, and then scoring during the 7–2 thrash at Calama. However his team was eliminated by Rosario Central in the next key for a 5–1 aggregate loss. During that season, Riveros and Cobreloa reached the Copa Chile final too, losing it to the hands of Universidad Católica.

At Loa River based-side, Riveros earned 175 and scored 74 times, being Cobreloa's playmaker for more than five years.

After his long spell with the Zorros del Desierto, in 2001, he moved to Santiago Wanderers, where he helped the team reach Primera División honour (league title) under Jorge Garcés as coach (who was Riveros´ manager in Cobreloa during 1995), achieving a title that the Wanderers had failed to win since 1968. That same season he was named the league most valuable player. In his last season at Valparaiso, Riveros reached a record, scoring 21 goals in 15 consecutive weeks during the 2004 Torneo Apertura.

In January 2005, Riveros joined Chilean powerhouse Universidad de Chile, where he had a short spell, playing the Copa Libertadores and netting two goals in 16 league games. After a regular performance with Los Azules, mid-year he moved to the Colombian side Deportivo Cali, where he won the Torneo Finalización.

After being released by Cali team, in 2006, Riveros re–joined his former club Santiago Wanderers. Then, mid-year he moved to Huachipato that was managed by Arturo Salah, who permanently used him as the starting lineup's playmaker. In December 2007, he failed to renew his contract and was released.

=== Everton ===
In 2008, he joined Everton and helped the team to win Torneo Apertura, being a key player during the campaign.

=== Retirement ===
In November 2011 he played in his last professional match with CD Palestino against Unión San Felipe.

== Managerial career ==
In 2014, Riveros became Deportes Santa Cruz coach.

== International career ==
He has played for seven different clubs and had been called up to the national team. He made his national team debut on 4 January 1997, against Armenia. He represented his country at the Copa América 1997 playing in two games.

He also played three games for Chile in 1998 FIFA World Cup qualification, and three others in the 2002 FIFA World Cup qualifying, where he scored a free kick goal against Colombia in a 3–1 away loss.

== Career statistics ==
=== International goals ===
Scores and results list Chile's goal tally first, score column indicates score after each Riveros goal.

List of international goals scored by Jaime Riveros
No.	Date	Venue	Opponent	Score	Result	Competition
1	4 January 1997	Estadio Sausalito, Viña del Mar, Chile	Armenia	4–0	7–0	Friendly
2	4 January 1997	Estadio Sausalito, Viña del Mar, Chile	Armenia	5–0	7–0	Friendly
3	29 January 2000	Estadio Metropolitano Roberto Melendez, Coquimbo, Chile	United States	1–1	1–2	Friendly
4	7 November 2001	Estadio El Campín, Bogotá, Colombia	Colombia	1–1	1–3	2002 World Cup qualification

== Honours ==
=== Club ===
Santiago Wanderers

- Primera División de Chile: 2001

Deportivo Cali

- Torneo Finalización: 2005

Everton

- Primera División de Chile: 2008 Apertura

=== Individual ===
- Chilean Footballer of the Year: 2001
- Record of regular phase consecutive weeks scoring 21 goals in 15 games: 2004
- Santiago Wanderers history's best signing according to El Mercurio de Valparaíso: 2004
- "El Gráfico" Ideal Team: 2008
- Santiago Wanderers Bicentennial Ideal Team: 2010
