= Francisco Castillo (footballer) =

Chilean footballer (born 1985)

Personal information
- Full name: Francisco Enrique Castillo Sáez
- Date of birth: 2 September 1985 (age 41)
- Place of birth: Talcahuano, Chile
- Height: 1.75 m (5 ft 9 in)
- Position: Forward

Senior career*
Years	Team	Apps	(Gls)
2003–2005	Huachipato		
2006	Lota Schwager		
2007	Deportes Concepción		
2008	Unión Española		
2008	Curicó Unido		
2009–2010	Naval		
2011–2015	Lota Schwager		
2014	Malleco Unido		
- * Club domestic league appearances and goals as of 21 March 2020

Francisco Enrique Castillo Sáez (born 2 September 1985) is a former Chilean footballer.

His last club was Lota Schwager.
