= 2008 Torneo Apertura (Chile) =

Campeonato Nacional Apertura Copa Banco Estado
- Season: 2008
- Dates: 25 January – 3 June 2008
- Champions: Everton; 4th title
- 2009 Copa Libertadores: Everton
- 2008 Copa Sudamericana: Ñublense; Universidad Católica
- Matches played: 205
- Goals scored: 613 (2.99 per match)
- Top goalscorer: Lucas Barrios (19 goals)
- Biggest home win: Universidad Católica 8–2 Santiago Morning (27 January)
- Total attendance: 1,017,445
- Average attendance: 4,963

The 2008 Campeonato Nacional Apertura Copa Banco Estado was the 83rd Chilean League top flight, in which Everton won its 4th league title after beating Colo-Colo in the finals. The 20 teams were organized into four groups, but played each other in a single round-robin format. The top-two teams from each group advanced to a single elimination play-off, but the best 3rd-place team had to worst 2nd-place team in an advancement play-off match.

== First stage ==
=== Results ===
	ANT	AUD	CLO	CSA	COL	DCO	EVE	HUA	LSE	MEL	ÑUB	OHI	OSO	PAL	RAN	SMO	UCA	UCH	UCO	UES
Antofagasta			1–1	0–1		2–1			1–0		0–1		1–1			1–2		2–1	3–3	
Audax	3–0		2–1	4–1	3–2	3–2			0–0					2–1		2–0	3–1		3–1	
Cobreloa								0–0	2–2		1–0	1–2		3–2		3–4	0–1	3–1	1–3	
Cobresal			1–0		3–2	4–1	4–0			4–2		0–0	2–0	2–4	2–0					3–0
Colo-Colo	2–1		0–0				3–1	2–2		4–3	1–4	1–1					0–1		1–0	
Concepción			2–0		2–2		3–2				0–0			1–3	2–4	2–1	2–1		2–0	1–1
Everton	2–0	2–1	4–2					0–0			1–1	1–3			3–1		0–2	3–1		
Huachipato	3–1	1–4		2–2		3–2					1–2	0–1	0–2				3–1	3–2		2–1
La Serena				1–1	2–2		1–0	2–1					2–1		1–0	5–1	1–1		2–4	2–3
Melipilla	0–1		1–2			3–4	0–1	2–4	2–3									0–3	3–1	1–2
Ñublense		3–2		2–1					1–0	2–0		2–1	2–0			3–1		0–0	3–1	
O'Higgins	0–0	3–0				1–0			4–1	1–1			4–1	0–2	2–1			3–1		
Osorno		1–3	1–2		0–3	1–3	2–1			3–1				1–0	2–1				1–3	
Palestino	1–1				1–0		1–2	1–2	0–2	2–1	3–0				0–2		1–1			2–3
Rangers	1–0	2–0	2–2		2–2			0–0		0–1	0–0					1–4	2–2			1–0
S. Morning				2–2	1–3		1–4	2–2		1–0		2–3	2–1	1–1					3–2	
U. Católica	4–0			2–1						2–0	1–2	2–0	2–0			8–2		2–0	2–0	1–2
U. de Chile		2–0		1–0	1–0	2–1			3–1				4–1	1–0	1–1	1–2				2–0
U. Concepción				3–1			3–1	2–0	2–1			0–0		2–3	1–2			1–1		1–0
U. Española	1–0	1–0	0–1		1–5		2–3				0–0	1–1	2–0			0–1				

=== Table ===
Pos	Team	Pld	W	D	L	GF	GA	GD	Pts	Qualification
1	Ñublense	19	12	5	2	28	14	+14	41	2008 Copa Sudamericana First Stage
2	Universidad Católica	19	11	3	5	37	19	+18	36	2008 Copa Sudamericana Preliminary
3	O'Higgins	19	10	6	3	30	17	+13	36	
4	Audax Italiano	19	11	1	7	35	25	+10	34	
5	Everton	19	10	2	7	34	30	+4	32	
6	Cobresal	19	9	4	6	35	26	+9	31	
7	Universidad de Chile	19	9	3	7	28	23	+5	30	
8	Santiago Morning	19	9	3	7	35	42	−7	30	
9	Colo-Colo	19	7	6	6	35	29	+6	27	
10	Huachipato	19	7	6	6	29	29	0	27	
11	Deportes La Serena	19	7	5	7	29	29	0	26	
12	Palestino	19	7	3	9	28	27	+1	24	
13	Unión Española	19	7	3	9	20	27	−7	24	
14	Rangers	19	6	6	7	23	25	−2	24	
15	Cobreloa	19	6	5	8	25	29	−4	23	
16	Universidad de Concepción	19	6	3	10	27	33	−6	21	
17	Deportes Antofagasta	19	4	5	10	16	29	−13	17	
18	Provincial Osorno	19	5	1	13	19	38	−19	16	
19	Deportes Concepción	19	7	3	9	33	37	−4	15 (Note: Deportes Concepción were docked nine points for using ineligible players in Round 2.)	
20	Deportes Melipilla	19	3	1	15	22	40	−18	10	

Updated to match(es) played on May 4, 2008. Source: RSSSF
Rules for classification: 1) points; 2) goal difference; 3) number of goals scored.

== Group standings ==
=== Group 1 ===
Pos	Team	Pld	W	D	L	GF	GA	GD	Pts	Qualification
1	Audax Italiano	19	11	1	7	35	25	+10	34	Playoffs
2	Everton	19	10	2	7	34	30	+4	32	Playoffs
3	Cobresal	19	9	4	6	29	29	0	31	Play-off Match
4	Huachipato	19	7	6	6	29	29	0	27	
5	Unión Española	19	7	3	9	20	27	−7	24	

=== Group 2 ===
Pos	Team	Pld	W	D	L	GF	GA	GD	Pts	Qualification
1	O'Higgins	19	10	6	3	30	17	+13	36	Playoffs
2	Universidad de Chile	19	9	3	7	28	23	+5	30	Playoffs
3	Santiago Morning	19	9	3	7	36	44	−8	30	
4	Deportes La Serena	19	7	5	7	29	29	0	26	
5	Palestino	19	7	3	9	28	27	+1	24	

=== Group 3 ===
Pos	Team	Pld	W	D	L	GF	GA	GD	Pts	Qualification
1	Colo-Colo	19	7	6	6	35	29	+6	27	Playoffs
2	Cobreloa	19	6	5	8	25	29	−4	23	Play-off Match
3	Deportes Antofagasta	19	4	5	10	16	29	−13	17	
4	Provincial Osorno	19	5	1	13	19	28	−9	16	
5	Deportes Melipilla	19	3	1	15	22	40	−18	10	

=== Group 4 ===
Pos	Team	Pld	W	D	L	GF	GA	GD	Pts	Qualification
1	Ñublense	19	12	5	2	29	13	+16	41	Playoffs
2	Universidad Católica	19	11	3	5	37	19	+18	36	Playoffs
3	Rangers	19	6	6	7	23	25	−2	24	
4	Universidad de Concepción	19	6	3	10	28	32	−4	21	
5	Deportes Concepción	19	7	3	9	35	38	−3	18 (Note: Deportes Concepción were docked six points for using ineligible players in Round 2.)	

Updated to match(es) played on May 4, 2008. Source: RSSSF
Rules for classification: 1) points; 2) goal difference; 3) number of goals scored.

== Play-off match ==
Team 1	Score	Team 2
Cobresal	2–2 (2–4 p)	Cobreloa

== Playoff stage ==
The clubs were seeded by their first phase standings.

Quarterfinals
5	Everton (a)	0	4	4
4	Audax Italiano	3	1	4
6	Universidad de Chile	4	2	6
3	O'Higgins	2	1	3
2	Universidad Católica	1	1	2
7	Colo-Colo	3	1	4
8	Cobreloa	2	1	3
1	Ñublense	2	2	4

Semifinals
5	Everton	3	1	4
6	Universidad de Chile	1	1	2
7	Colo-Colo(a)	0	2	2
1	Ñublense	1	1	2

Final
5	Everton	0	3	3
7	Colo-Colo	2	0	2

== Finals ==
28 May 2008
20:10 (UTC-4)

Colo-Colo	2 – 0	Everton
Barrios 85'; Fierro 90+2'

Monumental David Arellano, Santiago
Attendance: 31,482
Referee: P. Pozo
3 June 2008
18:10 (UTC-4)

Everton	3 – 0	Colo-Colo
Miralles 49', 77'; Riveros 70'

Estadio Sausalito, Viña del Mar
Attendance: 19,000
Referee: R. Selman

Campeonato Nacional
2008 Apertura champion
Everton
4th title

Everton qualified to the 2009 Copa Libertadores Second Stage.

== Top-five goalscorers ==
P	Scorer	Team	Goals
1	(Argentina) Lucas Barrios	Colo-Colo	19
2	(Chile) Esteban Paredes	Santiago Morning	15
3	(Chile) Manuel Villalobos	Universidad de Chile	13
3	(Argentina) Ezequiel Miralles	Everton	13
5	(Chile) Gabriel Vargas	Universidad de Concepción	12
