= 2007 Colo-Colo season =

Colo-Colo
2007 season
- Chairman: (Chile) Gabriel Ruiz-Tagle
- Manager: (Argentina) Claudio Borghi
- Stadium: Estadio Monumental
- Torneo Apertura: Winners
- Torneo Clausura: Winners
- Copa Libertadores: Round of 16
- Copa Sudamericana: Round of 16
- Top goalscorer: League: Humberto Suazo (20); All: Gonzalo Fierro (13)
Home colours	Away colours

The 2007 season was the 76th season for Club Social y Deportivo Colo-Colo, a Chilean football club based in Macul, Santiago. In the Primera División Chilena - the top tier of Chilean football - Colo-Colo won the Apertura (first half-season) tournament and came third in the Clausura (second half-season). They were eliminated in the first round of the knock-out stage in the Copa Libertadores and Copa Sudamericana competitions.

== Apertura 2007 ==
=== Squad ===
Note: Flags indicate national team as defined under FIFA eligibility rules; some limited exceptions apply. Players may hold more than one non-FIFA nationality.

No.	Pos.	Nation	Player
1	GK	ARG	Sebastián Cejas
2	DF	CHI	Bastián Arce
3	DF	CHI	Lucho Mena
4	DF	CHI	David Henriquez (captain)
5	DF	CHI	Miguel Riffo
6	DF	PAR	Gilberto Velázquez
7	FW	CHI	Alexis
8	MF	CHI	José Luis Jerez
9	MF	CHI	Rodrigo Millar
10	MF	COL	Giovanni Hernandez
11	FW	CHI	Gonzalo Fierro
12	GK	CHI	Rainer Wirth
14	DF	CHI	Cristian Abarca
15	MF	CHI	Moisés Villarroel
16	FW	CHI	Juan Gonzalo Lorca
17	MF	CHI	Arturo Sanhueza (vice-captain)

No.	Pos.	Nation	Player
18	MF	CHI	Rodrigo Melendez
19	MF	CHI	Juan Pablo Arenas
20	MF	PAR	Edison Giménez
21	MF	CHI	Gerson Acevedo
22	FW	CHI	César Reyes
23	DF	CHI	Arturo Vidal
24	DF	CHI	Boris Gonzalez
25	GK	CHI	Richard Leyton
26	FW	CHI	Humberto Suazo
27	DF	CHI	Gonzalo Jara
30	FW	CHI	Rodrigo Tapia
31	DF	CHI	Sergio Vasquez
34	MF	CHI	Ariel Salinas
--	GK	CHI	José Ignacio González

=== Squad changes ===
In:

- (Chile) Rainer Wirth Signed from (Chile) Universidad Católica
- (Paraguay) Gilberto Velázquez Transferred from (Paraguay) Club Guaraní
- (Chile) Rodrigo Millar Transferred from (Chile) Huachipato
- (Colombia) Giovanni Hernandez Comes from (Argentina) Colón de Santa Fe
- (Chile) Boris Gonzalez Transferred from (Chile) Cobreloa
- (Paraguay) Edison Gimenez Transferred from (Paraguay) Club 2 de Mayo
- (Chile) Gonzalo Jara Transferred from (Chile) Huachipato
- (Chile) Juan Gonzalo Lorca On Loan from (Chile) Huachipato

Out:

- (Chile) Matías Fernández Transferred to (Spain) Villarreal CF
- (Argentina) Miguel Caneo Returns to (Argentina) Godoy Cruz
- (Chile) Alex Varas Transferred to (Chile) Universidad de Concepción
- (Colombia) Andrés González Returns to (Colombia) América de Cali
- (Chile) Alvaro Ormeño Transferred to (Argentina) Gimnasia LP
- (Chile) Mario Caceres Transferred to (Greece) PAS Giannina
- (Chile) Felipe Flores On Loan to (Chile) Club Deportivo O'Higgins
- (Chile) Cristobal Jorquera On Loan to (Chile) Ñublense

=== Top-scorers ===
1. (Chile) Humberto Suazo 20 goals
2. (Colombia) Giovanni Hernandez 7 goals
3. (Chile) Gonzalo Fierro 6 goals
4. (Chile) Rodrigo Millar 3 goals
5. (Chile) Jose Luis Jerez 3 goals
6. (Chile) Arturo Vidal 2 goals
7. (Paraguay) Edison Gimenez 2 goals
8. (Chile) Juan Gonzalo Lorca 2 goals
9. (Chile) Moisés Villarroel 2 goals
10. (Chile) Ariel Salinas 1 goal
11. (Chile) Arturo Sanhueza 1 goal
12. (Chile) Alexis 1 goal

=== Table ===
Pos	Team	Pld	W	D	L	GF	GA	GD	Pts	Qualification
1	Colo-Colo	20	14	5	1	47	16	+31	47	2008 Copa Libertadores & 2007 Pre-Copa Sudamericana
2	Universidad Católica	20	14	4	2	36	14	+22	46	2007 Pre-Copa Sudamericana
3	Audax Italiano	20	13	5	2	39	20	+19	44	2007 Pre-Copa Sudamericana
4	Huachipato	20	12	4	4	35	21	+14	40	2007 Pre-Copa Sudamericana
5	Cobreloa	20	10	5	5	44	23	+21	35	

Source: Asociación Nacional de Fútbol Profesional

=== Results ===
January 27, 2007 1	Deportes Melipilla	1–2	Colo-Colo	Melipilla
	Carrasco 67'	Report	Fierro 46'; Gimenez 80'	Stadium: Roberto Bravo Santaibáñez; Referee: Eduardo Ponce

February 3, 2007 2	Colo-Colo	4–0	Deportes Concepción	Macul, Santiago
	Suazo 17' (pen.), 67'; Villarroel 24'; Lorca 77'	Report		Stadium: Monumental; Referee: Enrique Osses

February 10, 2007 3	Coquimbo Unido	0–3	Colo-Colo	Coquimbo
		Report	Rivera 17' (o.g.); Hernandez 16'; Fierro 29' (pen.)	Stadium: Franciso Sanchez Rumoroso; Referee: Pablo Pozo

February 17, 2007 4	Colo-Colo	4–2	Cobresal	Macul, Santiago
	Jerez 19'; Suazo 44' (pen.), 53'; Fierro 57'	Report	Fonseca 73'; Lira 86'	Stadium: Monumental; Referee: Claudio Fuenzalida

March 14, 2007 5	Universidad de Concepción	0–2	Colo-Colo	Concepción
		Report	Vidal 75'; Suazo 82'	Stadium: Municipal de Concepción; Referee: Pablo Pozo

February 28, 2007 6	Colo-Colo	2–1	Unión Española	Concepción
	Fierro 35', 82'	Report	Gutiérrez 15'	Stadium: Monumental; Referee: Enrique Osses

March 3, 2007 7	Colo-Colo	3–0	Antofagasta	Macul, Santiago
	Fierro 12'; Suazo 45'; Jerez 45'	Report		Stadium: Monumental; Attendance: 14,000; Referee: Enrique Osses

March 11, 2007 8	Ñublense	0–2	Colo-Colo	Chillan
		Report	Suazo 59', 66'	Stadium: Estadio Nelson Oyarzún; Attendance: 11,000; Referee: Enrique Osses

March 17, 2007 9	Lota Schwager	2–2	Colo-Colo	Macul, Santiago
	Figueroa 25'; Salcedo 85'	Report	Suazo 4'; Hernandez 67'	Stadium: Monumental; Referee: Eduardo Gamboa

April 11, 2007 10	Deportes La Serena	1–1	Colo-Colo	La Serena
	Canales 41'	Report	Suazo 90+3'	Stadium: La Portada; Referee: Eduardo Ponce

11	Bye

April 8, 2007 12	Colo-Colo	3–0	Puerto Montt	Macul, Santiago
	Suazo 55'; Hernandez 60', 89'	Report		Stadium: Monumental; Referee: Eduardo Gamboa

April 15, 2007 13	Everton	0–3	Colo-Colo	Viña del Mar
		Report	Suazo 54'; Hernandez 70'; Vidal 89'	Stadium: Sausalito; Referee: Carlos Chandía

April 21, 2007 14	Colo-Colo	6–2	O'Higgins	Viña del Mar
	Suazo 33', 58'; Millar 34', 85'; Hernandez 51', 65'	Report	Maldonado 21', 64'	Stadium: Sausalito; Attendance: 35,000; Referee: Eduardo Osses

April 29, 2007 15	Universidad de Chile	0–0	Colo-Colo	Ñuñoa, Santiago
		Report		Stadium: Estadio Nacional; Attendance: 60,000; Referee: Carlos Chandía

May 5, 2007 16	Cobreloa	2–2	Colo-Colo	Calama
	Diaz 24'; Barrios 48'	Report	Salinas 18'; Lorca 74'	Stadium: Municipal de Calama; Referee: Rubén Selman

May 12, 2007 17	Colo-Colo	3–1	Santiago Wanderers	Macul, Santiago
	Suazo 8'; Sanhueza 64'; Alexis 66'	Report	Perez 86'	Stadium: Monumental; Attendance: 40,000; Referee: Jorge Osorio

May 20, 2007 18	Audax Italiano	1–0	Colo-Colo	Ñuñoa, Santiago
	Moya 47'	Report		Stadium: Estadio Nacional; Referee: Rubén Selman

May 27, 2007 19	Colo-Colo	2–1	Universidad Católica	Macul, Santiago
	Millar 16'; Suazo 28'	Report	Fuertes 60'	Stadium: Monumental; Referee: Carlos Chandía

June 10, 2007 20	Huachipato	2–2	Colo-Colo	Concepción
	Contreras 36'; Yañez 68'	Report	Villarroel 79'; Suazo 88'	Stadium: Municipal de Concepción; Attendance: 30,000; Referee: Pablo Pozo

June 16, 2007 21	Colo-Colo	1–0	Palestino	Macul, Santiago
	Suazo 76'	Report		Stadium: Monumental; Referee: Enrique Osses

Results summary

Overall								Home						Away					
Pld	W	D	L	GF	GA	GD	Pts	W	D	L	GF	GA	GD	W	D	L	GF	GA	GD
20	14	5	1	47	16	+31	47	9	1	0	30	9	+21	5	4	1	17	7	+10

Last updated: 16 June 2007.
Source: Sólo Fútbol

== Clausura 2007 ==
=== Squad ===
Note: Flags indicate national team as defined under FIFA eligibility rules; some limited exceptions apply. Players may hold more than one non-FIFA nationality.

No.	Pos.	Nation	Player
1	GK	ARG	Cristián Muñoz
2	DF	CHI	Jorge Carrasco
3	DF	CHI	Lucho Mena
4	DF	CHI	David Henriquez (captain)
5	DF	CHI	Miguel Riffo
6	MF	CHI	José Luis Cabión
7	FW	CHI	Eduardo Rubio
8	MF	CHI	Rodrigo Millar
9	FW	CHI	Rodolfo Moya
10	MF	COL	Giovanni Hernandez
11	FW	CHI	Gonzalo Fierro
12	GK	CHI	Rainer Wirth
14	FW	URU	Gustavo Biscayzacu
15	MF	CHI	Moisés Villarroel

No.	Pos.	Nation	Player
16	MF	CHI	Juan Pablo Arenas
17	MF	CHI	Arturo Sanhueza (vice-captain)
18	MF	CHI	Rodrigo Melendez
20	DF	CHI	Boris Gonzalez
21	DF	CHI	Bastián Arce
22	FW	ARG	Claudio Bieler
23	MF	CHI	Roberto Cereceda
24	DF	CHI	Miguel Aceval
26	DF	CHI	Rafael Caroca
27	DF	CHI	Gonzalo Jara
31	DF	CHI	Bruno Romo
32	MF	CHI	Ariel Salinas
34	GK	CHI	José Ignacio González
35	MF	CHI	Boris Sagredo

=== Squad changes ===
In:

- (Argentina) Cristián Muñoz Transferred from (Chile) Huachipato
- (Chile) Jorge Carrasco Chirino Transferred from (Chile) Audax Italiano
- (Chile) Rodolfo Moya Transferred from (Chile) Audax Italiano
- (Chile) José Luis Cabión Transferred from (Chile) Deportes Melipilla
- (Chile) Roberto Cereceda Transferred from (Chile) Audax Italiano
- (Chile) Eduardo Rubio On Loan from (Mexico) Cruz Azul
- (Argentina) Claudio Bieler Transferred from (Argentina) Atlético Rafaela
- (Uruguay) Gustavo Biscayzacu Transferred from (Mexico) CF Atlante
- (Chile) Miguel Aceval Returns from (Chile) O'Higgins

Out:

- (Chile) Humberto Suazo Transferred to (Mexico) CF Monterrey
- (Chile) Alexis Returns to (Italy) Udinese Calcio
- (Chile) Arturo Vidal Sold to (Germany) Bayer 04
- (Argentina) Sebastian Cejas Back to (Argentina) Gimnasia LP
- (Chile) Jose Luis Jerez Transferred to (Greece) Panserraikos
- (Paraguay) Edison Giménez Transferred to (Paraguay) Olimpia Asunción
- (Paraguay) Gilberto Velázquez Transferred to (Paraguay) Olimpia Asunción

=== Top-soccers ===
1. (Chile) Gonzalo Fierro 11 goals
2. (Uruguay) Gustavo Biscayzacu 6 goals
3. (Colombia) Giovanni Hernandez 6 goals
4. (Argentina) Claudio Bieler 5 goals
5. (Chile) Eduardo Rubio 5 goals
6. (Chile) Rodrigo Millar 4 goals
7. (Chile) Rodolfo Moya 3 goals
8. (Chile) Roberto Cereceda 2 goals
9. (Chile) Miguel Riffo 2 goals
10. (Chile) Miguel Aceval 2 goals
11. (Chile) Jorge Carrasco Chirino 1 goal
12. (Chile) Gonzalo Jara 1 goal
13. (Chile) Boris Sagredo 1 goal
14. (Chile) Arturo Sanhueza 1 goal

=== Table ===
Overall table

Pos	Team	Pld	W	D	L	GF	GA	GD	Pts
1	Audax Italiano	20	14	5	1	47	20	+27	47
2	Universidad de Chile	20	13	6	1	42	21	+21	45
3	Colo-Colo	20	11	6	3	40	21	+19	39
4	Universidad de Concepción	20	9	8	3	30	19	+11	35
5	Universidad Católica	20	10	4	6	33	21	+12	34

Group 1

Pos	Team	Pld	W	D	L	GF	GA	GD	Pts	Qualification
1	Colo-Colo	20	11	6	3	40	21	+19	39	Playoffs
2	Cobresal	20	8	8	4	31	23	+8	32	Playoffs
3	Palestino	20	6	6	8	27	23	+4	24	
4	Deportes La Serena	20	6	4	10	25	33	−8	22	
5	Santiago Wanderers	20	4	5	11	15	43	−28	17	

=== Results ===
24 July 2007 1	Colo-Colo	4–1	Deportes Melipilla	Macul, Santiago
	Aceval 10' (pen.); Lorca 34'; Fierro 56' (pen.), 70'	Report	Valladares 74'	Stadium: Monumental; Referee: Jorge Osorio

29 July 2007 2	Deportes Concepción	0–3	Colo-Colo	Concepción
		Report	Millar 11'; Lorca 35'; Fierro 43'	Stadium: Collao

5 August 2007 3	Colo-Colo	2–1	Coquimbo Unido	Macul, Santiago
	Hernández 38', 68'	Report; Highlights	Corrales 12'	Stadium: Monumental; Referee: Manuel Acosta

12 August 2007 4	Cobresal	2–1	Colo-Colo	El Salvador
	Laffatigue 58'; Vargas 70'	Report	Carrasco 37'	Stadium: El Cobre

15 August 2007 5	Colo-Colo	2–2	Universidad de Concepción	Macul, Santiago
	Riffo 46'; Fierro 79' (pen.)	Report	Solís 12' (pen.); Aros 14'	Stadium: Monumental; Attendance: 12,000; Referee: Álvaro García

19 August 2007 6	Unión Española	2–2	Colo-Colo	Ñuñoa, Santiago
	Fuentes 77'; Neira 90+1'	Report; Last Goal	Rubio 16'; Hernández 50'; Meléndez (red card) 85'	Stadium: Nacional

25 August 2007 7	Deportes Antofagasta	1–1	Colo-Colo	Antofagasta
	Arancibia 42'	Report	Bieler 47'	Stadium: Regional; Attendance: 20,000; Referee: Carlos Chandía

1 September 2007 8	Colo-Colo	3–1	Ñublense	Macul, Santiago
	Bieler 1'; Fierro 39' (pen.); Cereceda 90+1'	Report	Barra 6'	Stadium: Monumental; Referee: Claudio Fuenzalida

15 September 2007 9	Lota Schwager	0–1	Colo-Colo	Concepción
		Report	Millar 37'	Stadium: Collao; Referee: Guido Aros

22 September 2007 10	Colo-Colo	2–0	Deportes La Serena	Macul, Santiago
	Biscayzacú 4', 90'	Report		Stadium: Monumental; Attendance: 10,000; Referee: Manuel Acosta

11	Bye

29 September 2007 12	Deportes Puerto Montt	0–2	Colo-Colo	Puerto Montt
		Report	Fierro 83' (pen.); Moya 90+4'	Stadium: Chinquihue; Attendance: 10,000; Referee: Jorge Osorio

3 October 2007 13	Colo-Colo	2–2	Everton	Macul, Santiago
	Aceval 26' (pen.); Cereceda 59'	Report	Urbano 56'; Olea 80'	Stadium: Monumental

7 October 2007 14	O'Higgins	2–1	Colo-Colo	Rancagua
	González 29'; Varas 42'; Pereira (red card) 90+1'	Report	Biscayzacú 21'	Stadium: El Teniente

21 October 2007 15	Colo-Colo	2–2	Universidad de Chile	Macul, Santiago
	Fierro 45' (pen.); Riffo 84'	Report	S. Pinto 25', 90'	Stadium: Monumental; Attendance: 45,000; Referee: Carlos Chandía

24 October 2007 16	Colo-Colo	1–1	Cobreloa	Macul, Santiago
	Jara 1'	Report	Canío 66'	Stadium: Monumental

27 October 2007 17	Santiago Wanderers	0–4	Colo-Colo	Valparaíso
		Report	Fierro 17'; Millar 23', 45+1'; Hernández 72'	Stadium: Regional Chiledeportes

1 November 2007 18	Colo-Colo	1–4	Audax Italiano	Macul, Santiago
	Bieler 87'	Report	Medina 12'; Orellana 15'; Villanueva 34'; Gutiérrez 73'	Stadium: Monumental; Attendance: 15,000; Referee: Enrique Osses

4 November 2007 19	Universidad Católica	0–1	Colo-Colo	Ñuñoa, Santiago
		Report	Hernández 75'	Stadium: Nacional; Attendance: 10,000

11 November 2007 20	Colo-Colo	4–0	Huachipato	Macul, Santiago
	Rubio 11', 40'; Moya 37', 61'	Report		Stadium: Monumental

25 November 2007 21	Palestino	0–1	Colo-Colo	Rancagua
		Report	Sagredo	Stadium: El Teniente

Results summary

Overall								Home						Away					
Pld	W	D	L	GF	GA	GD	Pts	W	D	L	GF	GA	GD	W	D	L	GF	GA	GD
20	11	6	3	40	21	+19	39	5	4	1	23	14	+9	6	2	2	17	7	+10

Last updated: 25 November 2007.
Source: Sólo Fútbol

=== Play-offs ===
Quarter-finals

1 December 2007 1st leg	O'Higgins	0–5	Colo-Colo	Rancagua
12:30		Report	Fierro 50'; Sanhueza 66'; Bieler 67', 78'; Hernández 83' (pen.)	Stadium: El Teniente; Attendance: 11,620; Referee: Enrique Osses

8 December 2007 2nd leg	Colo-Colo	1–1 (6–1 agg.)	O'Higgins	Macul, Santiago
18:30	Rubio 10'	Report	Hans Gómez 34'	Stadium: Monumental; Attendance: 10,000; Referee: Eduardo Ponce

Semi-finals

13 December 2007 1st leg	Colo-Colo	2–0	Universidad de Chile	Macul, Santiago
19:00	Fierro 15'; Rubio 21'	Report		Stadium: Monumental; Attendance: 25,000; Referee: Pablo Pozo

16 December 2007 2nd leg	Universidad de Chile	0–1 (0–3 agg.)	Colo-Colo	Ñuñoa, Santiago
19:00		Report	Biscayzacú 52'	Stadium: Nacional; Attendance: 35,000; Referee: Enrique Osses
Note: The match was suspended at the 67th minute due to incidents between Universidad de Chile supporters and the police.

Finals

20 December 2007 1st leg	Universidad de Concepción	0–1	Colo-Colo	Concepción
21:00		Report	Biscayzacú 48'	Stadium: Collao; Attendance: 32,500; Referee: Pablo Pozo

23 December 2007 2nd leg	Colo-Colo	3–0 (4–0 agg.)	Universidad de Concepción	Macul, Santiago
18:30	Fierro 18'; Biscayzacú 87'; Bieler 90'	Report		Stadium: Monumental; Attendance: 45,000; Referee: Enrique Osses

== Copa Libertadores ==
=== Group stage ===
Pos	Team	Pld	W	D	L	GF	GA	GD	Pts
1	(Chile) Colo-Colo (A)	6	3	0	3	12	7	+5	9
2	(Venezuela) Caracas (A)	6	3	0	3	7	10	−3	9
3	(Ecuador) LDU Quito	6	2	2	2	7	8	−1	8
4	(Argentina) River Plate	6	2	2	2	5	6	−1	8

Source: RSSSF
(A) Advanced to the round of 16

22 February 2007 Matchday 1	Colo-Colo (Chile)	1–2	(Argentina) River Plate	Santiago, Chile
21:00 UTC−3	Suazo 61'	Report	Ponzio 45+1'; Farías 54'; Falcao (red card) 63'	Stadium: Monumental; Attendance: 48,000; Referee: Carlos Torres (Paraguay)

7 March 2007 Matchday 2	LDU Quito (Ecuador)	3–1	(Chile) Colo-Colo	Quito, Ecuador
17:00 UTC−5	Obregón 46'; Salas 79' (pen.); Guerrón 85'; Lara (red card) 87'	Report	Suazo 32'; Henríquez (red card) 84'	Stadium: La Casa Blanca; Attendance: 15,000; Referee: Albert Duarte (Colombia)

20 March 2007 Matchday 3	Caracas FC (Venezuela)	0–4	(Chile) Colo-Colo	Cúcuta, Colombia
18:30 UTC−5		Report	Alexis 21', 59', 88'; Giménez 27'	Stadium: General Santander; Referee: Hernando Buitrago (Colombia)
Note: The match was played in Colombia as the Brígido Iriarte Stadium in Caracas didn't met the requirement of minimum capacity (20,000) for the tournament.

30 March 2007 Matchday 4	Colo-Colo (Chile)	2–1	(Venezuela) Caracas FC	Santiago, Chile
18:15 UTC−4	Fierro 44'; Suazo 90+1' (pen.)	Report	González 68'	Stadium: Monumental; Attendance: 11,310; Referee: Manuel Garay (Peru)

3 April 2007 Matchday 5	Colo-Colo (Chile)	4–0	(Ecuador) LDU Quito	Santiago, Chile
20:15 UTC−4	Fierro 50' (pen.), 73'; Suazo 65'; Millar 78'	Report		Stadium: Monumental; Attendance: 32,518; Referee: Roberto Silvera (Uruguay)

25 April 2007 Matchday 6	River Plate (Argentina)	1–0	(Chile) Colo-Colo	Buenos Aires, Argentina
19:30 UTC−3	Galván 62'	Report		Stadium: Monumental; Attendance: 10,000; Referee: Paulo César de Oliveira (Brazil)

=== Round of 16 ===
2 May 2007 1st leg	Club América (Mexico)	3–0	(Chile) Colo-Colo	Mexico City, Mexico
17:30	Cabañas 26'; Fernández 30'; Rojas 54'; Davino (red card) 82'	Report		Stadium: Azteca; Attendance: 95,000; Referee: Antonio Arias (Paraguay)

8 May 2007 2nd leg	Colo-Colo (Chile)	2–1 (2–4 agg.)	(Mexico) Club América	Santiago, Chile
18:15	Castro 70' (o.g.); Suazo 88'; Meléndez (red card) 90'	Report	Infante 86'	Stadium: Monumental; Attendance: 26,569; Referee: Jorge Larrionda (Uruguay)

== Copa Sudamericana ==
Colo-Colo qualified to the Liguilla Pre-Sudamericana after reaching the Top 4 in the Torneo Apertura.

19 July 2007 Liguilla	Colo-Colo	2–1	Huachipato	Viña del Mar
19:15	Hernández 10'; Cabión (yellow card) 28'; Villarroel (yellow card) 39'; Aceval 87'; Jara (yellow card) 89'	Report	González 7'; Contreras (yellow card) 25'; Riveros (yellow card) 55'	Stadium: Sausalito; Attendance: 8,000; Referee: Carlos Chandía
Note: Colo-Colo received a 1-match ban for the Estadio Monumental due to incidents in the match against Santiago Wanderers.

=== First stage ===
2 August 2007 1st Leg	Real Potosí (Bolivia)	1–1	(Chile) Colo-Colo	Potosí, Bolivia
20:00	Santos (yellow card) 11'; Cabión 48' (o.g.); Ribeiro (yellow card) 75'; Colque (yellow card) 86'	Report	Jara 15'; Sanhueza (yellow card) 66'; Villarroel (yellow card) 76'	Stadium: Mario Mercado Vaca Guzmán; Attendance: 12,000; Referee: Antonio Arias (Paraguay)

9 August 2007 2nd Leg	Colo-Colo (Chile)	3–1 (4–2 agg.)	(Bolivia) Real Potosí	Santiago, Chile
19:15	Hernández 33'; Fierro 45+2' (pen.); Henríquez (yellow card) 62'; Moya 90+1'	Report	Brandan 9'; Paz (yellow card) 27'; Monteiro (yellow card) 44'	Stadium: Monumental; Attendance: 8,154; Referee: Juan Pablo Pompei (Argentina)

=== Second stage ===
26 August 2007 1st Leg	Colo-Colo (Chile)	0–0	(Chile) Audax Italiano	Santiago, Chile
19:15	Meléndez (yellow card) 16'; Sanhueza (yellow card) 16'; Moya (yellow card) 60'; Mena (yellow card) 89'	Report		Stadium: Monumental; Attendance: 18,000; Referee: Eduardo Ponce (Chile)

4 September 2007 2nd Leg	Audax Italiano (Chile)	1–1 (1–1a agg.)	(Chile) Colo-Colo	Santiago, Chile
19:00	Di Santo 1'; Orellana (yellow card) 52'; Leal (yellow card) 59'; Rieloff (red card) 88'	Report	Carrasco (yellow card) 9'; Sanhueza (yellow card) 29'; Bizcayzacú 86'	Stadium: Nacional; Attendance: 12,000; Referee: Pablo Pozo (Chile)

=== Round of 16 ===
25 September 2007 1st Leg	Millonarios (Colombia)	1–1	(Chile) Colo-Colo	Bogotá, Colombia
19:00	Bedoya (yellow card) 9'; Quintero (yellow card) 65'; Ciciliano 66'; Martínez (yellow card) 79'	Report	Rubio 30'; Riffo (yellow card) 65'	Stadium: El Campín; Attendance: 28,819; Referee: Víctor Hugo Rivera (Peru)

4 October 2007 2nd Leg	Colo-Colo (Chile)	1–1 (2–2 agg.) (6–7 p)	(Colombia) Millonarios	Santiago, Chile
21:30	Jara (yellow card) 19'; Bizcayzacú 40'; Meléndez (yellow card) 47'; Mena (yellow card) 67'	Report	Estrada (yellow card) 30'; Mosquera 36'; Díaz (yellow card) 81'	Stadium: Monumental; Attendance: 31,500; Referee: Héctor Baldassi (Argentina)
	Penalties
	Cereceda (penalty scored); Bizcayzacú (penalty scored); Millar (penalty scored); Mena (penalty scored); Fierro (penalty scored); Bieler (penalty scored); Sanhueza (penalty missed)		(penalty scored) Ciciliano; (penalty scored) Bedoya; (penalty scored) Martínez; (penalty scored) Villagra; (penalty scored) Quintero; (penalty scored) Mosquera; (penalty scored) Estrada

== Friendlies and other matches ==
19 January 2007 Noche Alba	Colo-Colo	3–1	(Argentina) Quilmes	Santiago
22:00	Giménez 26'; Jerez 28'; Fierro 55'	Report	Pereira 58'	Stadium: Monumental

24 January 2007 Copa Gato (Summer)	Colo-Colo	1–1 (6–7 p)	Universidad de Chile	Concepción
22:00	Acevedo 69'	Report	S. Pinto 78'	Stadium: Collao; Referee: Patricio Polic
	Penalties
	Valenzuela (penalty missed); Abarca (penalty scored); Fierro (penalty scored); Acevedo (penalty scored); Cejas (penalty scored); Lorca (penalty scored); Jara (penalty scored); Giménez (penalty missed)		(penalty scored) Estrada; (penalty scored) Rojas; (penalty scored) Martínez; (penalty missed) Opazo; (penalty scored) S. Pinto; (penalty scored) M. Pinto; (penalty scored) García; (penalty scored) Pino

12 July 2007 Copa Gato (Winter)	Colo-Colo	1–1	Universidad de Chile	La Serena
22:00	Carrasco 36'; Mena (red card) 47'	Report	Delgado (red card) 42'; Galaz 64'	Stadium: La Portada; Attendance: 8,000; Referee: Jorge Osorio

15 July 2007 Copa Gato (Winter, Replay)	Universidad de Chile	1–0 (2–1 agg.)	Colo-Colo	La Serena
22:00	Rojas 64'	Report		Stadium: La Portada; Attendance: 12,000
