= Rainer Wirth =

Chilean footballer (born 1982)

Personal information
- Full name: Rainer Klaus Wirth Castro
- Date of birth: 25 October 1982 (age 44)
- Place of birth: Santiago, Chile
- Height: 1.86 m (6 ft 1 in)
- Position: Goalkeeper

Youth career
- 1994–2001: Universidad Católica

Senior career*
Years	Team	Apps	(Gls)
2002–2006	Universidad Católica	25	(0)
2006	→ Deportes Temuco (loan)	0	(0)
2007–2008	Colo-Colo	17	(0)
2009	→ Municipal Iquique (loan)	10	(0)
2010–2011	Unión Española	21	(0)
2012	Deportes La Serena	25	(0)
2014–2015	Magallanes	16	(0)
Total		114	(0)
- * Club domestic league appearances and goals

Rainer Klaus Wirth Castro (born 25 October 1982) is a Chilean former professional footballer who played as a goalkeeper.

== Club career ==
=== Universidad Católica ===
Born in Santiago in 1982, a son of the famous goalkeeper Oscar Wirth, Rainer joined Universidad Católica youth ranks in 1994, when he was 12. Eight years later, he was promoted to Católica's first team, being designated as the second-choice goalkeeper under the American Jonny Walker. In the 2002 season, Wirth won the Apertura Tournament title. The next year, on 15 April, he debuted in the 2003 Copa Libertadores, in a 1–1 draw with the Brazilian side Paysandu.

After of years of regularly playing for Católica and a loan completed to Deportes Temuco in January 2006, in June of that year, he returned from his loan because the record-man José María Buljubasich was operated on for a benign brain tumor. He played all the second semester of the season with Católica. His contract was not renewed and he was released from the club in December.

=== Colo-Colo ===
On 5 January 2007, Wirth moved to rival team Colo-Colo for an undisclosed fee; the same month he traveled to England to try out with Premier League club Manchester City. It was revealed that the Chilean played very well, but the club was not looking for a goalkeeper. Wirth was originally signed as second-choice goalkeeper, as back-up to Sebastián Cejas. On 27 January, he made his club debut in a 2–1 win over Deportes Melipilla, replacing the injured Cejas in the 45th minute. On 5 May, after of the elimination of Colo-Colo in the Copa Libertadores, Wirth played his second game for the club, in the 2−2 away draw with Cobreloa, the full 90 minutes. He won his third professional title after a successful championship of Colo-Colo, only losing one match of twenty, that was against Audax Italiano in a 1–0 loss with goal of Rodolfo Moya.

Despite Cristián Muñoz's joining the team, after the Cejas' departure of the club, Wirth played in Colo-Colo's opening game of the Clausura Tournament, and his club won 4–1. On 2 August 2007, Wirth was chosen ahead of Muñoz to start in the Copa Sudamericana first stage game against Real Potosí. He produced a man-of-the-match performance, saving numerous challenging shots which helped Colo-Colo to draw the game 1–1. Wirth continued his run of starts in his next six appearances, contesting the post with the goalkeeper Muñoz, that finally was selected as the first-choice goalkeeper, due to his good performances in the field, after conceding only one goal in the playoffs, that meant Wirth was the second-choice goalkeeper of Colo-Colo.

In January 2008, Wirth played the friendly tournament City of Osorno, playing very well in the 2–2 draw with Unión Española, saving three shots in the penalties. Despite that, Wirth not started in the first week of the Apertura Tournament against Provincial Osorno. In the fifth week of the tournament against Rangers, Wirth was started in a 2–2 draw, in where he conceded a goal to the forward Lucas Palma in the last minute of game. After the surprise resignation of Claudio Borghi as coach, who led Colo-Colo to important victories, Wirth was starter in the first game of Fernando Astengo as coach, in a 2–1 win over Deportes Antofagasta, in which he also saved a penalty, but in the repetition of that for overtaking of Wirth, he failed to save the penalty and conceded a goal in the victory. He again started in the two last weeks of the regular phase against Cobreloa and Cobresal. After the penta-championship loss against Everton, the coach Astengo was fired and arrived the former footballer of the club, Marcelo Barticciotto, who only used to Wirth in a Copa Chile game against Fernández Vial, that Colo-Colo won 4–2. After his lack of games in the season, it was reported that Wirth would no longer be part of the plans of Barticciotto.

=== Municipal Iquique ===
On 29 December 2008, it was reported that Wirth and Cristobal Jorquera would join Municipal Iquique. The next day, it was confirmed that he joined Municipal Iquique along with the Argentine striker Cristián Campozano. The keeper arrived to the club on loan. On 9 January 2009, he traveled to the city of Iquique and joined the club training. On 29 January, Wirth debuted in a 4–0 defeat against his former club, Universidad Católica. The next week, against Curicó Unido, he played very well in a 1–0 win. On 13 February, for the third matchday of the tournament, received a free kick goal from Jaime Riveros in a 1–0 defeat with Everton, but in the next game, Wirth kept a clean sheet in a 3–0 win over Palestino. In the sixth week of the 2009 Apertura Tournament against Universidad de Chile, he played very well in an important draw without goals. On 8 February, Wirth suffered an achilles tendon rupture in his left foot, in a league match against Santiago Morning. During the match against Morning he played just 25 minutes, being replaced by Rodrigo Naranjo. The next day it was reported that he would miss the rest of the tournament, because his injury would require a recovery period of four months.

Wirth was fully recovered from his injury in August, and on the 27th, against San Marcos de Arica, he saved the last shot in the penalty kicks to Nicolás Ortíz, that send to Iquique to the Copa Chile quarterfinals. In the weeks eight and nine, he played against Ñublense and Audax Italiano, in where Iquique was defeated 3–1 and 2–0, respectively. After his last appearances for the team, Naranjo with best performances of Wirth won the post of the first-choice keeper of the club.

=== Unión Española ===
On 1 January 2010, Wirth signed a contract with Unión Española, after being released by Colo-Colo. Rainer officially debuted on 16 July in a 2–1 home loss against Unión San Felipe, recently in the second part of the tournament after of the FIFA World Cup. On 5 September, Wirth again started for Unión in a 3–2 win over Everton, and in a surprise move five days later, was selected by the coach José Luis Sierra for play against Universidad Católica. He again was selected by Sierra for play in the last games of the tournament and in the Copa Libertadores playoffs ahead of Luis Marín due to Wirth's good performance. He also won the Libertadores playoffs title, after the defeat of Audax Italiano in the final.

Wirth started the 2011 season as the first choice goalkeeper of Unión for the Copa Libertadores preliminary stage against Bolívar, following of the departures of Luis Marín to O'Higgins and Gregory Saavedra to Deportes Temuco. He kept two clean sheets in the two games of the key against Bolívar, helping to his team in advance to the next stage, after a 1–0 win of Unión in the aggregate result. For the national tournament he started in the first week against Cobreloa, in where he conceded two goals in a 2–0 home loss, but in his next game for the second week against Santiago Wanderers, he was the man-of-the-match in a 2–1 victory. Following the incorporation of the keepers Eduardo Lobos and the Uruguayan Federico Elduayen, he was relegated as the second-choice goalkeeper of the club, because Elduayen suffered a serious injury of three-months that forced him to miss the Apertura Tournament.

After the first semester, Lobos was purchased by Colo-Colo and Wirth started the first six games of Unión in the Clausura Tournament, due to the recovery period of Elduayén. When the Uruguayan keeper was fully recovered from his injury, it was expected that Wirth would be the first choice goalkeeper of the club, but with the good performance of Elduayén, Wirth finally was the second goalkeeper of Unión. In December was reported that he and some other players would be released.

=== La Serena ===
On 10 January 2012, it was reported that Wirth would play in Deportes La Serena for the Apertura Tournament and replace the Argentine keeper Marcos Gutiérrez, who was released from the club despite a good season. On 28 January, he made his debut in a 2–0 loss against Rangers for the Apertura's first week, receiving goals of José Luis Silva and Milton Caraglio, after a good free kick of the last. In the next game against the 2011 Copa Sudamericana champion Universidad de Chile, Wirth played very well, despite the 3–1 loss, stopping numerous attempts of the rival adversary.

== Personal life ==
He is the son of former Chilean international Oscar Wirth who was part of national team-1982 World Cup squad and the grandson of Fernando Wirth, a defender who played for Santiago Morning. His uncle, Erwin, took part of Chile at under-20 level in the 1971 South American Championship.

His sister, Beatriz, is a Chile international field hockey goalkeeper.

He studied at the Finis Terrae University.

== Honours ==
=== Club ===
Universidad Católica

- Primera División de Chile:2002 Apertura, 2005 Clausura

Colo-Colo

- Primera División de Chile: 2007 Apertura, 2007 Clausura, 2008 Clausura
