= Boris Sagredo =

Chilean footballer (born 1989)

Personal information
- Full name: Boris Alexis Sagredo Romero
- Date of birth: 21 March 1989 (age 37)
- Place of birth: San Felipe, Chile
- Height: 1.73 m (5 ft 8 in)
- Position: Attacking midfielder

Team information
- Current team: San Marcos

Youth career
- 2001–2007: Colo-Colo

Senior career*
Years	Team	Apps	(Gls)
2007–2009	Colo-Colo	17	(2)
2008	→ Palestino (loan)	15	(0)
2009	Deportes Iquique	8	(0)
2010	Rangers	21	(1)
2011–2013	O'Higgins	85	(15)
2013–2014	Santiago Wanderers	32	(4)
2014–2015	Ñublense	19	(2)
2015–2018	San Luis	69	(6)
2019	ABC	13	(0)
2019–2024	Barnechea	91	(10)
2025	Unión San Felipe	21	(3)
2026–	San Marcos	0	(0)

International career
2007–2012	Chile	3	(0)
2008	Chile U23	6	(1)
- * Club domestic league appearances and goals as of 14 December 2025

Boris Alexis Sagredo Romero (Spanish pronunciation: [ˈboɾis aˈleksis saˈɣɾeðo], born 21 March 1989) is a Chilean footballer who plays as an attacking midfielder for San Marcos de Arica.

== Club career ==
=== Colo-Colo ===
He made his debut on 3 October 2007, against Everton. His name became somewhat of a household name among Colo-Colo supporters after the 4 November 2007, match against rival Universidad Católica. He came on in the 76th minute for Gonzalo Jara and just a minute later gave an assist to Giovanni Hernandez for the lone goal of the match. Then in the second match after that, Sagredo scored his first goal for Colo-Colo against Palestino.

Currently Sagredo is playing for the Chilean soccer team Palestino. Sagredo was moved to the club because frankly he did not fit in Astengo's large squad despite his incredible talent and speed, and the move was made on order to secure more playing time for the Chilean midfielder. Although Sagredo was disappointed with the transfer out of Colo Colo, he is still motivated to play football and hopes that one day he will move to a large club.

In 2011, he was signed by O'Higgins.

At the end of the 2024 season, Sagredo ended his contract with Barnechea and switched to Unión San Felipe for the 2025 season. The next year, he moved to San Marcos de Arica.

== International career ==
On 19 February 2008, Chile's U-18 squad took on Mexico's U-23 squad in an exhibition match. Sagredo was ejected from the game in the '35 after receiving his second yellow card. Chile lost 2–0.

At 19 years old, Sagredo represented Chile in the U-23 2008 Toulon Tournament, where he scored a goal in Chile's 5–3 win against France and started in the 2–0 win against the Netherlands as well as Chile's 2–0 win against Japan.

== Honours ==
=== Club ===
Colo-Colo

- Primera División de Chile (3): 2006 Clausura, 2007 Apertura, 2007 Clausura

Palestino

- Primera División de Chile (1): Runner-up 2008 Clausura

O'Higgins

- Primera División de Chile (1): Runner-up 2012 Apertura

=== International ===
- Toulon Tournament (1): Runner–up 2008
