= Jorge Carrasco =

Chilean footballer (born 1982)

Personal information
- Full name: Jorge Antonio Carrasco Chirino
- Date of birth: 1 February 1982 (age 44)
- Place of birth: Santiago, Chile
- Height: 1.77 m (5 ft 10 in)
- Position: Defender

Team information
- Current team: Deportes Linares (assistant)

Youth career
- Audax Italiano

Senior career*
Years	Team	Apps	(Gls)
2001–2007	Audax Italiano	144	(1)
2007–2010	Colo-Colo	53	(1)
2009	→ Palestino (loan)	24	(0)
2011–2013	Universidad de Concepción	48	(0)
Total		269	(2)

International career
1999	Chile U17		

Managerial career
- 2013–2014: Audax Italiano (youth)
- 2014: Deportes Melipilla (assistant)
- 2018: Cobreloa (assistant)
- 2019–2021: Deportes Colina (assistant)
- 2021: Cobreloa (assistant)
- 2023: Iberia (assistant)
- 2024–2025: Deportes Linares (assistant)
- 2026–: Deportes Linares (assistant)
- * Club domestic league appearances and goals

Jorge Antonio Carrasco Chirino (born February 1, 1982) is a Chilean former footballer who played as a defender.

== Playing career ==
His professional debut came in 2001 with Audax after spending time in their youth system. He made the switch to Colo-Colo from Audax with teammates Rodolfo Moya and Roberto Cereceda in the summer of 2007. Carrasco has become a regular with the Colo-Colo's first team.

He represented Chile at the 1999 South American Under 17 Football Championship, which took place in Uruguay, and at the 2004 CONMEBOL Men Pre-Olympic Tournament, which took place in Chile.

== Coaching career ==
Since 2014, Carrasco has served as an assistant coach of Rodrigo Meléndez for clubs such as Cobreloa, Deportes Linares, among others.

== Titles ==
=== Player ===
Colo-Colo

- Primera División de Chile (1): 2007 Clausura

== Club statistics ==
Club Performance
Club	Season	League		Cup		Total
Club	Season	App	G.A	App	G.A	App	G.A
Club Deportivo Universidad de Concepción	Apertura 2011	13	0	-	-	13	0
Club Deportivo Universidad de Concepción	Clausura 2011	17	0	-	-	17	0
Club Deportivo Universidad de Concepción	Apertura 2012	12	0	-	-	12	0
Club Deportivo Universidad de Concepción	Clausura 2012	5	0	-	-	5	0
Club Total		47	0	-	-	47	0
