= Moisés Villarroel (Chilean footballer) =

Chilean footballer and manager (born 1976)

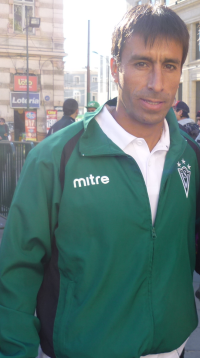

Personal information
- Full name: Moisés Fermín Villarroel Ayala
- Date of birth: 12 February 1976 (age 50)
- Place of birth: Viña del Mar, Chile
- Height: 1.72 m (5 ft 7 1/2 in)
- Position: Midfielder

Senior career*
Years	Team	Apps	(Gls)
1995–2002	Santiago Wanderers	167	(12)
2003–2008	Colo-Colo	165	(8)
2009–2014	Santiago Wanderers	94	(3)
Total		429	(23)

International career
1997–2005	Chile	34	(1)

Managerial career
- 2014–2018: Santiago Wanderers (youth)
- 2018: Santiago Wanderers
- 2018–2021: Santiago Wanderers (youth)
- 2021: Santiago Wanderers (interim)
- * Club domestic league appearances and goals

Moisés Fermín Villarroel Ayala (born 12 February 1976) is a Chilean football manager and former player who played as a midfielder.

== Career ==
He played for Colo-Colo, where he was part of the 2006 apertura, 2006 clausura, 2007 apertura, 2007 clausura, 2008 clausura championship teams.

Now he is the captain of Santiago Wanderers club where he started his football

career.

Villarroel's international debut came in a match against Venezuela, which Chile won 6–0 on April 29, 1997. He has capped 34 times and scored 1 goal for the Chile national team between 1997 and 2005, including four games at the 1998 FIFA World Cup. He has also represented his country in four Copa América tournaments.

Villaroel has mainly played as a right sided defender and defensive midfielder. He has been described as a tough defensive minded player with a high work-rate.

== Coaching career ==
=== Santiago Wanderers ===
Short after retiring in 2014, Villarroel started coaching the youth teams at Santiago Wanderers. On 21 March 2018, Villarroel was appointed as the new manager of Santiago Wanderers. Until December 2021, he was the manager of Santiago Wanderers' youth setup.

== Personal life ==
He is the father of the professional footballers Martín and Cristóbal Villarroel, who are products of the Santiago Wanderers youth system.

== Honours ==
=== Club ===
Santiago Wanderers

- Segunda División de Chile (1): 1995
- Primera División de Chile (1): 2001

Colo-Colo

- Primera División de Chile (5): 2006-A, 2006-C, 2007-A, 2007-C, 2008-C
