= Bastián Arce =

Chilean footballer (born 1989)

Personal information
- Full name: Bastián Alexis Arce Ramírez
- Date of birth: August 17, 1989 (age 37)
- Place of birth: Chile
- Height: 1.81 m (5 ft 11 in)
- Position: Defender

Youth career
- 1997–2006: Colo-Colo

Senior career*
| Years | Team | Apps | (Gls) |
| 2007–2009 | Colo-Colo | 10 | (0) |
| 2009 | → Rangers (loan) | 20 | (0) |
| 2010–2012 | Santiago Morning | 21 | (0) |
| 2012 | → Provincial Osorno (loan) | 18 | (2) |
| 2013 | Deportes Puerto Montt | 16 | (1) |
| 2013–2014 | Iberia | 9 | (0) |
| 2014–2015 | Deportes Linares | 3 | (0) |
| Total | | 97 | (3) |

International career
| 2005 | Chile U17 | | |
| 2009 | Chile U20 | 3 | (0) |
- * Club domestic league appearances and goals

Bastián Alexis Arce Ramírez (born August 17, 1989) is a Chilean former footballer who played as a defender.

== Club career ==
A product of Colo-Colo youth system, his professional debut came against Cobreloa on May 5, 2007. Because Colo-Colo had an important Copa Libertadores 2007 match three days later, coach Claudio Borghi decided to rest his starting line up, which allowed Arce to make his professional debut.

== International career ==
He has represented his country at the Sub-17 level in the 2005 South American Championship. and at the Sub-20 level in the 2009 South American Championship. He also took part in the Chile squad for the 2009 Toulon Tournament where Chile became the champion.

== Honors ==
=== Club ===
Colo-Colo

- Primera División de Chile (3): 2007 Apertura, 2007 Clausura, 2008 Clausura
