= Juan Gonzalo Lorca =

Chilean footballer (born 1985)

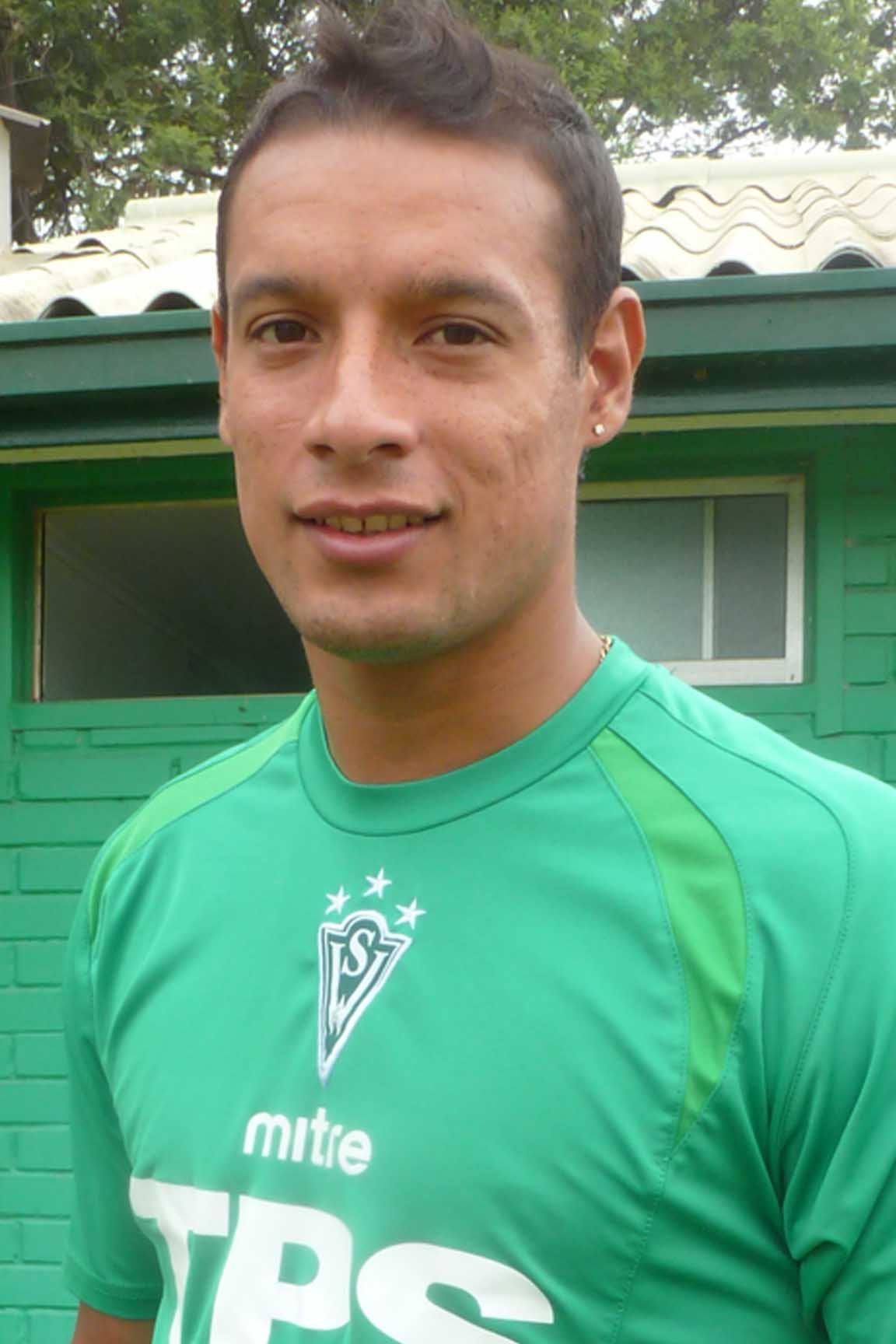
- Lorca with Santiago Wanderers in 2012

Personal information
- Full name: Juan Gonzalo Lorca Donoso
- Date of birth: 15 January 1985 (age 41)
- Place of birth: Santiago, Chile
- Height: 1.83 m (6 ft 0 in)
- Position: Forward

Team information
- Current team: Jardín del Edén (manager)

Youth career
- 1997–2004: Colo-Colo

Senior career*
| Years | Team | Apps | (Gls) |
| 2004–2009 | Colo-Colo | 26 | (8) |
| 2006 | → Huachipato (loan) | 35 | (11) |
| 2007–2008 | → Vitesse Arnhem (loan) | 26 | (2) |
| 2009 | → O'Higgins (loan) | 29 | (10) |
| 2010–2011 | Boulogne | 9 | (0) |
| 2011 | → O'Higgins (loan) | 24 | (7) |
| 2012 | Santiago Wanderers | 17 | (2) |
| 2012 | Deportivo Quito | 12 | (2) |
| 2013 | Rangers | 13 | (3) |
| 2013–2014 | Deportes Antofagasta | 33 | (7) |
| 2014–2015 | → Ñublense (loan) | 29 | (7) |
| 2016–2017 | Magallanes | 18 | (4) |
| Total | | 271 | (63) |

International career
| 2005 | Chile U20 | 9 | (3) |
| 2006–2009 | Chile | 11 | (1) |
| 2008 | Chile U23 | 5 | (1) |

Managerial career
- 2026–: Jardín del Edén
- * Club domestic league appearances and goals

Juan Gonzalo Lorca Donoso (born 15 January 1985) is a Chilean former footballer who played as a forward. He is the current manager of Jardín del Edén in the Chilean Tercera B.

== Club career ==
Lorca began his career with Colo-Colo's youth squad when he turned twelve years old. He began as an attacking midfielder, but soon made the switch to forward. On July 7, 2004, Lorca made his professional debut against Universidad Católica in a Copa Sudamericana match, which ended in a 1–1 tie. However his first goal would not come until the following month against Cobreloa.

In 2006, Lorca was loaned to Chilean club Huachipato for both the apertura and clausura tournaments. He was capped 34 times and scored 11 times before returning to Colo-Colo for the 2007 Apertura tournament. After his return, he has only been a fringe player because the team already has prominent forwards. Lorca left Colo-Colo once again after the 2007 Apertura, this time to go to Europe to play for Dutch team Vitesse Arnhem, he then returned to Colo-Colo in mid-2008.

Lorca signed in O'Higgins because he didn't have many chances to play in Colo-Colo.

In January 2010, US Boulogne signed the Chilean forward from Colo Colo for around 400,000 Euros on a three-and-a-half-year deal.

He returned for 6 months on loan from US Boulogne to O'Higgins.

== International career ==
Lorca has represented the Chile national team at the U-20, U-23, and senior levels. He took part in the 2005 South American Youth Championship, which qualified for the 2005 FIFA World Youth Championship in the Netherlands. However, he did not make the trip to Europe due to injury.

In 2006, he started to appear in friendly games with the adult squad and went on to be included by Nelson Acosta in the squad for 2007 Copa América despite not being a regular in his team at the time, Colo-Colo. He then got call ups from Marcelo Bielsa during the 2010 World Cup qualifying stage but remained an unused substitute in official games. However, he did play all the games in the 2008 Toulon Tournament, where he scored one goal.

His only adult National Team goal to date was scored against Jamaica in a 2007 friendly which Chile won 1–0.

== Coaching career ==
In April 2026, Lorca assumed as manager of Jardín del Edén FC in the Chilean Tercera B.

== Personal life ==
Lorca does not like to be called Juan, and says his family and friends call him Gonzalo or Chalo. He is the nephew of former Audax Italiano defender Benjamín Lorca, who also represented Chile at under-20 level in 1977.

Lorca is a candidate to councillor for La Florida commune in the 2024 Chilean municipal elections alongside his former colleague Boris Rieloff.

== Honours ==
Colo-Colo

- Primera División de Chile: 2007 Apertura, 2008 Clausura
