= Roberto Cereceda =

Chilean footballer (born 1984)

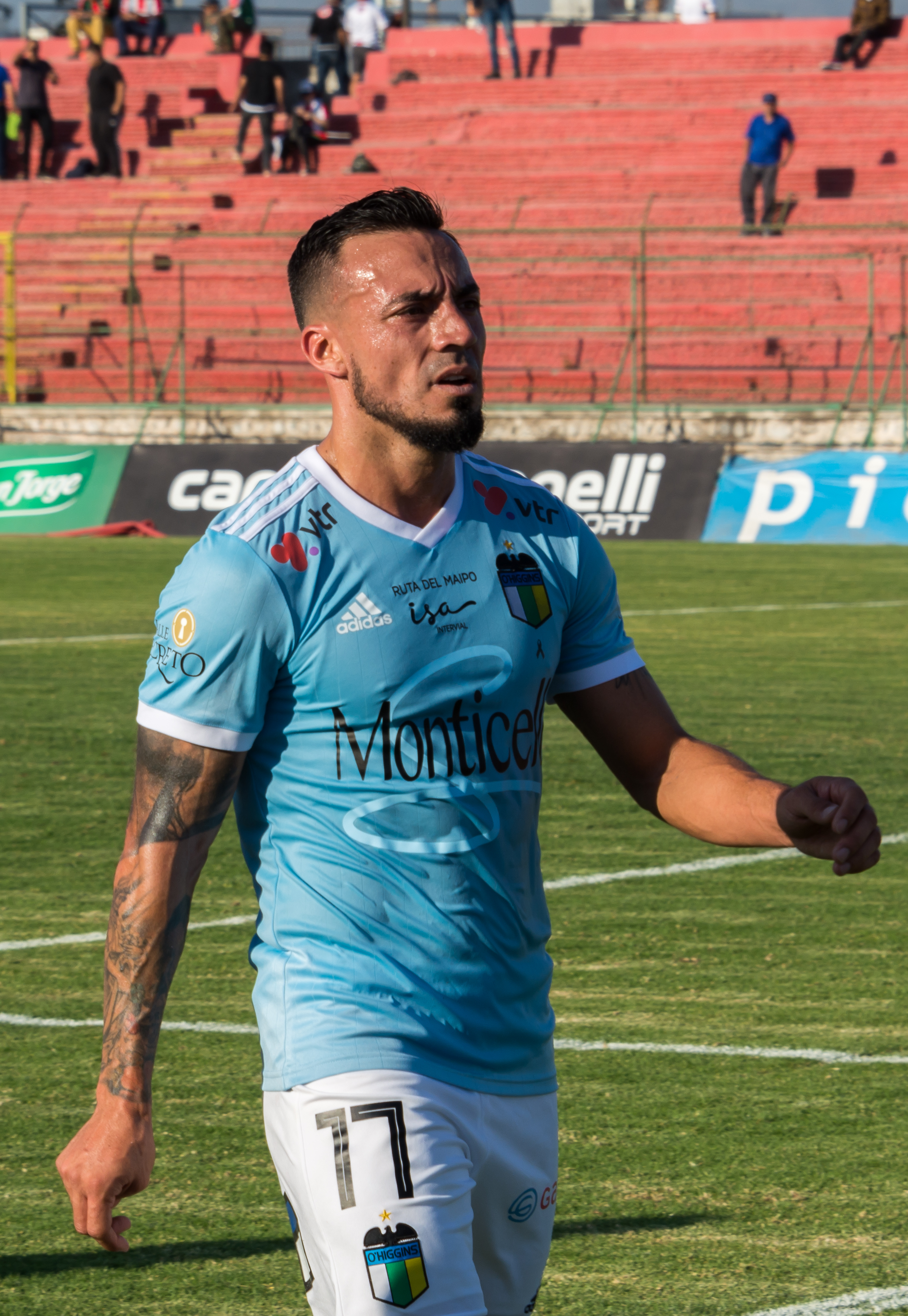
- Cereceda with O'Higgins in 2019

Personal information
- Full name: Roberto Andrés Cereceda Guajardo
- Date of birth: 10 October 1984 (age 42)
- Place of birth: Santiago, Chile
- Height: 1.74 m (5 ft 8 1/2 in)
- Position: Left-back

Team information
- Current team: San Antonio Unido

Youth career
- Colo-Colo
- Audax Italiano

Senior career*
Years	Team	Apps	(Gls)
2002–2007	Audax Italiano	93	(6)
2007–2010	Colo-Colo	94	(3)
2011	Universidad Católica	19	(2)
2012–2015	Universidad de Chile	67	(3)
2014	→ Figueirense (loan)	18	(0)
2015	Figueirense	13	(0)
2016	Unión La Calera	13	(4)
2016–2017	Palestino	39	(1)
2018–2021	O'Higgins	74	(3)
2021–2023	Audax Italiano	62	(0)
2024–	San Antonio Unido	0	(0)

International career^{‡}
2006–2010	Chile	32	(1)
2008	Chile U23	4	(1)
- * Club domestic league appearances and goals as of 25 January 2024 ‡ National team caps and goals as of 19 April 2020

Roberto Andrés Cereceda Guajardo (born 10 October 1984) is a Chilean footballer, who plays as a left-back for San Antonio Unido in the Segunda División Profesional de Chile.

== Club career ==
=== Audax Italiano ===
Cereceda started in the youth ranks of Colo-Colo before moving to another Santiago club, Audax Italiano. In 2002, Cereceda made his professional debut with Chilean club Audax Italiano. Cereceda made 93 caps with Audax and scored six goals in the five years he played with the first team.

Audax made their first appearance in international competition in 2007, in which Cereceda participated. In the third group match against Alianza Lima of Peru, Cereceda scored his first goal in international competition in the 3–1 victory. The team along with Cereceda tied with São Paulo of Brazil with 11 points in group play but failed to make the second round due to goal differential. His play in the tournament and in the national tournament led him to return to his former club Colo-Colo.

=== Colo-Colo ===
Prior to the 2007 Torneo Clausura, Cereceda signed with Colo-Colo to replace departed players Jose Luis Jerez and Arturo Vidal. Cereceda participated in his second international competition in the 2007 Copa Sudamericana where Colo-Colo would play against his former team Audax in the preliminary round. Cereceda and Colo-Colo would be eliminated in the round of 16 of the Copa Sudamericana but would go on to win the national championship with Cereceda inserted in the starting line up for most of the tournament.

In 2008, Cereceda participated in his second straight Copa Libertadores edition, but this time with Colo-Colo. However the result would be the same for Cereceda, with his team being eliminated in the group stage once again. In the national competition, Cereceda failed to win his second straight national championship with Colo-Colo losing in the final against Everton. Cereceda would lift his second and third national championship at the end of the 2008 and 2009 Torneo Clausura.

In 2009, Cereceda participated in his third straight Copa Libertadores and his team was eliminated in the group stage for the third straight time.

=== Universidad Católica ===
He was confirmed to be the new player in San Carlos de Apoquindo, in July 2011.

=== Return to Audax Italiano ===
In 2021, Cereceda returned to Audax Italiano, ending his contract in December 2023.

=== San Antonio Unido ===
In 2024, he signed with San Antonio Unido in the Segunda División Profesional de Chile.

== International career ==
Cereceda was called up to the Chile national team friendlies in 2007 by coach Nelson Acosta. In May 2008, Cereceda was called to the Chilean U-23 squad that played in a tournament in Malaysia, where he scored a goal. During this tournament in Malaysia, Cereceda caught the eye of Chile national team coach Marcelo Bielsa and to the surprise of many people in Chile, Cereceda was called up to play in the 2010 FIFA World Cup qualification matches against Bolivia and Venezuela. Wearing number 3, Cereceda started both games playing fullback. Ever since that Cereceda was regularly called up for other qualification matches. In total leading up to Chile's qualification to the 2010 FIFA World Cup, Cereceda capped ten times for Chile starting in seven matches and receiving three yellow cards.

== Honours ==
=== Club ===
Colo-Colo

- Primera División de Chile (3): 2007 Clausura, 2008 Clausura, 2009 Clausura

Universidad Católica

- Copa Chile (1): 2011

=== International goals ===
#	Date	Venue	Opponent	Score	Result	Competition
1.	October 9, 2010	Sheikh Zayed Stadium, Abu Dhabi, United Arab Emirates	United Arab Emirates	1–0	2-0	Friendly
