= Juan Pablo Arenas =

Chilean soccer player (born 1987)

Personal information
- Full name: Juan Pablo Arenas Núñez
- Date of birth: 22 April 1987 (age 39)
- Place of birth: Santiago, Chile
- Height: 1.72 m (5 ft 8 in)
- Position: Midfielder

Youth career
- Colo-Colo

Senior career*
Years	Team	Apps	(Gls)
2004–2008	Colo-Colo	19	(0)
2008	→ Santiago Morning (loan)		
2008	→ Deportes Melipilla (loan)	11	(0)
2009	Deportes Melipilla	0	(0)
2009–2011	Magallanes	12	(0)
2012	Provincial Osorno		
2012–2015	Trasandino	67	(2)
2018	Puma Generaleña	–	(–)

International career
2007	Chile U20	7	(2)
- * Club domestic league appearances and goals

Juan Pablo Arenas Núñez (born 22 April 1987) is a Chilean former professional footballer who played as a midfielder.

== Club career ==
Arenas made his professional debut with Colo-Colo at the young age of seventeen against arch rival Universidad de Chile on 1 August 2004.

He played for Colo-Colo and also played (on loan) in Deportes Melipilla.

His last club was Puma Generaleña in the 2018–19 Segunda División de Costa Rica, where he coincided with his compatriots Cristián Abarca and Bastián Lecaros. He retired at the age of 31.

== International career ==
Arenas was capped at the under-20 level. He was selected in the squad for the 2007 FIFA U-20 World Cup in Canada, he did not play any minutes during the that tournament. He scored two goals at U20 level. His first goal came against Colombia to clinch the 5-0 Chilean victory.

== Honours ==
Colo-Colo

- Chilean Primera División: 2006-A, 2006-C, 2007-A, 2007-C
- Copa Sudamericana runner-up: 2006

Magallanes

- Tercera División A: 2010
