= David Henríquez (footballer, born 1977) =

Chilean footballer

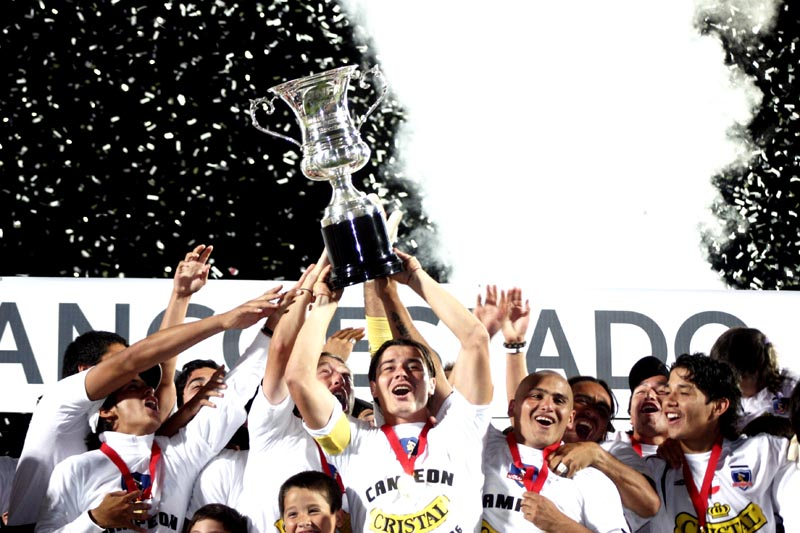

Personal information
- Full name: David Andrés Henríquez Espinoza
- Date of birth: 12 July 1977 (age 49)
- Place of birth: Santiago, Chile
- Height: 1.79 m (5 ft 10 in)
- Position: Centre back

Youth career
- 1986–1994: Colo-Colo

Senior career*
Years	Team	Apps	(Gls)
1995–2007	Colo-Colo	187	(5)
2003	→ Beira Mar (loan)	2	(0)
2004–2005	→ Morelia (loan)	36	(2)
2008–2009	Dorados de Sinaloa	48	(4)
2009–2012	Universidad Católica	57	(5)
Total		330	(16)

International career
2000	Chile U23	8	(0)
2001–2003	Chile	5	(0)
- * Club domestic league appearances and goals

David Andrés Henríquez Espinoza (born 12 July 1977) is a Chilean former professional footballer who played as centre back. Henríquez played for clubs in the Primera División, Liga MX, Ascenso MX, and the Primeira Liga. He was known for his strength, marking and heading ability.

== Club career ==
=== Colo-Colo ===
At the end of 2007, Henríquez contract was not renewed with Chilean Colo-Colo. After the 2007 Clausura championship game, he did not celebrate much with the team as he knew the team was not going to renew his contract. He was injured and could not finish his last game with Colo-Colo. He left the club as one of the most decorated players in club history, and was the team's captain. In the 2006 Clausura Tournament, Henríquez led them to the championship, which was the twenty-fifth in Colo-Colo's storied history. He made his professional debut playing defender for Colo-Colo on 11 February 1995.

== International career ==
Henríquez also made appearances with the Chile national team from 2001 to 2003. He was a member of the national squad competing at the 2000 Summer Olympics in Sydney, which won the bronze medal. Previously, he took part in the Pre-Olympic Tournament.

== Outside of football ==
He was a candidate for the Chamber of Deputies in the 2017 Chilean general election, supported by Progressive Party of Chile.

== Honours ==
Colo-Colo

- Primera División de Chile: 1996, 1997–C, 1998, 2002–C, 2006–A, 2006–C, 2007–A, 2007–C
- Copa Chile: 1996
- Copa Sudamericana runner–up: 2006

Universidad Católica

- Primera División de Chile: 2010
- Copa Chile: 2011

Chile

- Olympic Bronze Medal: 2000
