= Ariel Salinas =

Chilean footballer (born 1989)

Personal information
- Full name: Ariel Alberto Salinas Salinas
- Date of birth: March 9, 1989 (age 37)
- Place of birth: San Felipe, Chile
- Height: 1.73 m (5 ft 8 in)
- Position: Midfielder

Team information
- Current team: Independiente de Cauquenes
- Number: 19

Youth career
- Colo-Colo

Senior career*
Years	Team	Apps	(Gls)
2007	Colo-Colo	5	(1)
2008–2009	Unión San Felipe	25	(0)
2010	Trasandino	28	(6)
2011–2014	Barnechea	21	(3)
2014–2017	Deportes Pintana	45	(8)
2017–2019	Deportes Recoleta	38	(3)
2019–2020	Deportes Vallenar	39	(6)
2022–	Independiente de Cauquenes	6	(0)
- * Club domestic league appearances and goals as of 16 May 2022

Ariel Alberto Salinas Salinas (born 9 March 1989) is a Chilean footballer that currently plays for Chilean Second Division club Independiente de Cauquenes.

== Club career ==
Salinas came up through Colo-Colo's youth ranks and made his debut for the club on May 5, 2007, against Cobreloa. After making only 5 league appearances for Colo-Colo he joined Unión San Felipe in 2008.

== Honours ==
=== Club ===
Colo-Colo

- Primera División de Chile (2): 2007 Apertura, 2007 Clausura

Unión San Felipe

- Primera B de Chile (2): 2009 Apertura, 2009 Clausura
- Copa Chile (1): 2009
