= Richard Leyton =

Chilean footballer (born 1987)

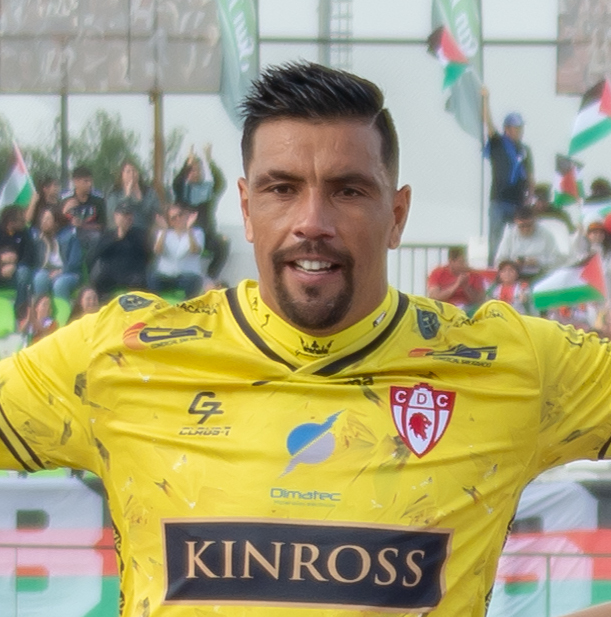
- Leyton with Deportes Copiapó in 2023

Personal information
- Full name: Richard Andrés Leyton Abrigo
- Date of birth: January 25, 1987 (age 39)
- Place of birth: Santiago, Chile
- Height: 1.87 m (6 ft 2 in)
- Position: Goalkeeper

Team information
- Current team: Deportes Copiapó
- Number: 1

Youth career
- 2003–2005: Colo-Colo

Senior career*
| Years | Team | Apps | (Gls) |
| 2006–2007 | Colo-Colo | 9 | (0) |
| 2008–2009 | Deportes Puerto Montt | 16 | (0) |
| 2010 | Santiago Morning | 1 | (0) |
| 2010 | Ñublense | 0 | (0) |
| 2011 | San Luis | 11 | (0) |
| 2012–2014 | Coquimbo Unido | 61 | (0) |
| 2014–2015 | Curicó Unido | 27 | (0) |
| 2015–2016 | Malleco Unido | 31 | (0) |
| 2016–2018 | Deportes Valdivia | 43 | (0) |
| 2019 | Rangers | 9 | (0) |
| 2020–2021 | Universidad de Concepción | 2 | (0) |
| 2021– | Deportes Copiapó | 12 | (0) |

International career^{‡}
| 2007 | Chile U20 | 2 | (0) |
| 2008 | Chile U23 | 0 | (0) |
- * Club domestic league appearances and goals as of 15 November 2021 ‡ National team caps and goals as of 21:43, 5 February 2010 (UTC)

Richard Andrés Leyton Abrigo (born January 25, 1987) is a Chilean footballer, who plays goalkeeper for Deportes Copiapó.

== Club career ==
He made his professional debut in 2006 in a game versus Deportes Puerto Montt.

In 2010, he joined Santiago Morning.

== International career ==
In the 2007 South American Youth Championship in Paraguay, Leyton started the first two games for Chile. Chile lost those two games by a combined scored of 5–2. Leyton was regulated to the bench and Cristopher Toselli took over in goal for the rest of the tournament and subsequently the 2007 FIFA U-20 World Cup in Canada. Leyton did not make the trip to Canada.

Later, he represented Chile U23 at the 2008 Inter Continental Cup in Malaysia.

== Personal life ==
At the same time Leyton has developed his football career, he has worked as a real estate agent and started a playground in Copiapó named Atacama Jump.

== Honours ==
Colo-Colo

- Primera División de Chile (4): 2006 Apertura, 2006 Clausura, 2007 Apertura, 2007 Clausura
