= José Luis Cabión =

Chilean footballer

Councilor of Melipilla
- Incumbent
- Assumed office 28 July 2021

Personal details
- Party: Close to Evópoli
Association football career
- Full name: José Luis Cabión Dianta
- Date of birth: 14 November 1983 (age 42)
- Place of birth: San Antonio, Chile
- Height: 1.73 m (5 ft 8 in)
- Position: Defensive midfielder
Senior career*
Years	Team	Apps	(Gls)
2004–2007	Deportes Melipilla	86	(1)
2007–2011	Colo-Colo	28	(0)
2008	→ Everton (loan)	11	(0)
2009	→ Santiago Morning (loan)	21	(0)
2010	→ Cobresal (loan)	26	(1)
2011–2012	Cobresal	38	(0)
2013	Neftchi Baku	1	(0)
2013–2015	Rangers	36	(0)
2014	→ Santiago Morning (loan)	10	(0)
2015–2017	Cobresal	47	(1)
2018–2023	Deportes Melipilla	77	(1)
Total		381	(4)
International career
2007	Chile	6	(0)
Managerial career
- 2022: Deportes Melipilla (women) (youth)
- * Club domestic league appearances and goals

José Luis Cabión Dianta (born 14 November 1983) is a Chilean footballer who plays for Deportes Melipilla as midfielder.

On 17 May 2021, he was elected councilor of Melipilla representing the centre-right party Political Evolution (Evópoli).

== Club career ==
Born in San Antonio, he began his career at Deportes Melipilla of the Chilean second tier. Following Melipilla's promotion to first tier in 2007, he became the team's captain, which allowed him call-ups for Chile national team friendlies and then the Copa América held in Venezuela.

Due to his performance, Colo-Colo noticed him and he joined the Estadio Monumental–based side in July 2007. He was a regular player in the Claudio Borghi scheme, being an occasional player in the starting lineup for league and international games. However, the 2008 season wasn't successful for Cabión, as he was relegated to the reserves and had a fight with Rodolfo Moya during training, that triggered his loan to Everton de Viña del Mar, a freshly Chilean champion in the age.

After an inconspicuous spell at Everton, he was released from the team in December 2008 and joined Santiago Morning (on loan too) to face the 2009 season. Then he played the entire 2010 for Cobresal on loan.

In 2011, he returned to the Colo-Colo first-team and was a regular starter with coach Américo Gallego at Copa Libertadores and league games. Nevertheless, in mid-year, he left the club and again joined Cobresal.

In 2013, Cabión moved Azerbaijan's Neftchi Baku after a successful trial, agreeing to a 6-month contract. There, he helped Neftchi to win the Azerbaijan Cup.

In July 2013, he returned to Chile and joined the Rangers, being loaned to Santiago Morning in 2014.

In 2015, he returned to Cobresal, to face the local tournament and the Copa Libertadores.

His last club was Deportes Melipilla in 2023.

== International career ==
He made his first international cap in a 3–0 win over Cuba at Rubén Marcos Peralta Stadium as a 79th-minute substitution for Boris Rieloff. After participating in Chile's 2007 Copa América preparatory friendlies around the Caribbean. National team's coach, Nelson Acosta, included Cabión in Chile's definitive 23-man squad to face the contest.

During all games of Chile in the cup, he was on the bench, debuting as a 57th-minute substitution for centre-back Gonzalo Jara in a 6–1 thrash with Brazil at Puerto La Cruz.

== Coaching career ==
In August 2022, he assumed as coach of Deportes Melipilla women's team at under-16 level.

== Statistics ==
As of March 1st, 2016

Chile national team
Year	Apps	Goals
2007	6	0
Total	6	0

== Honours ==
Melipilla

- Primera B de Chile (2): 2004, 2006

Colo-Colo

- Primera División de Chile (1): 2007 Clausura

Neftchi Baku

- Azerbaijan Cup (1): 2012–13
