= Bruno Romo =

Chilean footballer (born 1989)

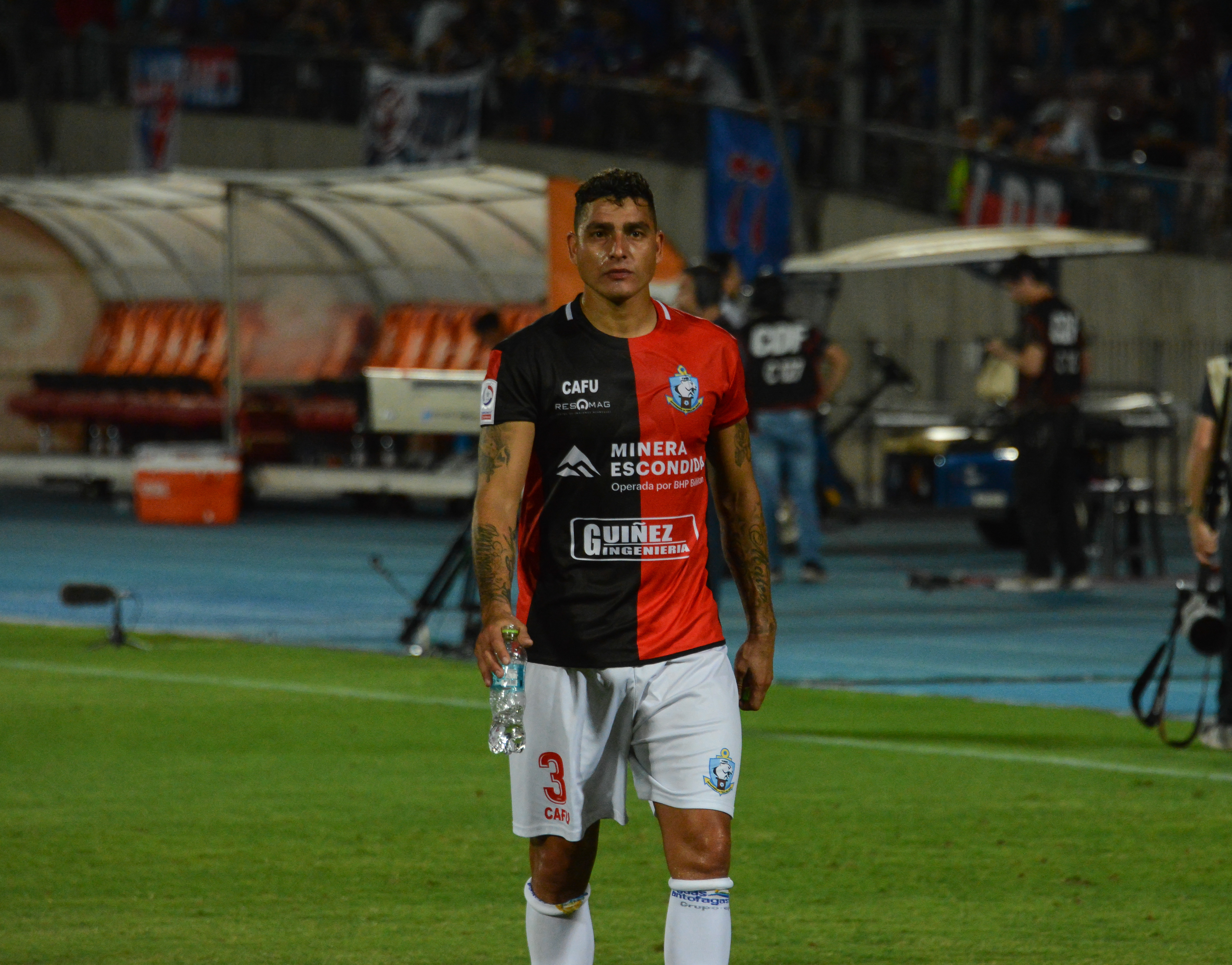
- Romo with Deportes Antofagasta in 2018

Personal information
- Full name: Bruno Sebastián Romo Rojas
- Date of birth: 20 May 1989 (age 37)
- Place of birth: Santiago, Chile
- Height: 1.85 m (6 ft 1 in)
- Position: Centre-back

Youth career
- 2002–2006: Colo-Colo

Senior career*
Years	Team	Apps	(Gls)
2006–2014	Colo-Colo	19	(0)
2007	Colo-Colo B	18	(0)
2008	→ Santiago Wanderers (loan)	12	(0)
2010–2011	→ Palestino (loan)	47	(0)
2012–2013	Colo-Colo B	12	(0)
2013–2014	→ Deportes Copiapó (loan)	32	(1)
2014–2017	Rangers	93	(14)
2017–2022	Deportes Antofagasta	54	(5)
2020	→ Juárez (loan)	23	(2)
2021	→ Palestino (loan)	19	(1)
2022	→ Deportes Copiapó (loan)	18	(1)
2023	Deportes Copiapó	8	(0)
2024	Unión La Calera	6	(0)
2025	Santiago City	11	(1)
2026	Universidad Arturo Prat	–	(–)
2026	Deportivo Las Cabras	–	(–)
Total		372	(25)

International career
2009	Chile U20	4	(0)
2011	Chile U25	2	(0)
- * Club domestic league appearances and goals

Bruno Sebastián Romo Rojas (born 20 May 1989) is a Chilean former professional footballer who played as a defender. Before re-joining Colo-Colo, Romo played for Palestino and Santiago Wanderers, where the player had a great performance at the first club mentioned.

He played for the Chilean national U20 national team in the 2009 South American Youth Championship held in Venezuela. Romo was named in Chile's preliminary 30-man squad for the 2011 Copa América on 27 May 2011, although he was eventually omitted from the final 23-man squad on 28 June.

== Club career ==
=== Early career ===
Romo professionally debuted for Colo-Colo in November 2006, where he made a good match in a 1–0 home win over Deportes Puerto Montt for the first leg of the playoffs quarterfinals. In that moment, the coach Fernando Astengo directed him because the coach Claudio Borghi prepared the first team for the Copa Sudamericana. In the first half of 2007, Romo integrated Colo-Colo B and in the second half integrated into the first team, where he won the 2007 Clausura Tournament, this being his second professional title after the 2006 Clausura Tournament.

In March 2008, Borghi left the club and arrived Fernando Astengo, who directed him in the game that Colo-Colo won against Puerto Montt in the 2006 playoffs. His debut with Astengo was in a 1–0 home loss with Ñublense, now for the playoffs of 2008. His team was the runner-up of the tournament, losing 3–2 against Everton in the aggregate result. After losing the final, the club loaned him to Santiago Wanderers.

In January 2009, he returned to Colo-Colo, being directed now by Marcelo Barticciotto in the Apertura Tournament. In that season, Romo won the Clausura Tournament, but with Hugo Tocalli due to Barticciotto being fired after a poor first semester.

=== Palestino ===
In January 2010, Romo joined Palestino on loan. His incorporation to that club was due to a barter of Luis Pavez for Gerardo Cortés, Rodolfo Moya and him. The player was one of the key players of the club along with Cortés, Nicolás Canales and Jaime Riveros. In the next season, for the Apertura Tournament under the coach Gustavo Benítez, Romo was named in the ideal team of the tournament and also was named in Chilean national football team's preliminary 30-man squad for the 2011 Copa América on 27 May 2011, although he was eventually omitted from the final 23-man squad on 28 June.

Despite the irregularity of Palestino, Romo continued being an important player in the starting lineup of the team, so much so that Colo-Colo's directive confirmed him in the next season team that is coached by Ivo Basay, who directed him at the 2009 South American Youth Championship in Venezuela. During the season, Romo made 30 appearances and did not score goals, having a total of 47 matches played for the club between the 2010 and 2011 season, seventeen in his first season and thirty in his next season.

=== Unión La Calera ===
In 2024, he joined Unión La Calera.

=== Late career ===
In February 2025, Romo signed with Santiago City in the Segunda División Profesional de Chile. In July of the same year, he assumed as the sport manager of Iberia.

In April 2026, Romo joined the Universidad Arturo Prat team in the Liga Magisterial from Iquique. In July of the same year, he switched to Deportivo Las Cabras from Las Cabras commune.

== International career ==
He played for the Chilean national U20 national team in the 2009 South American Youth Championship held in Venezuela. Romo was named in Chile's preliminary 30-man squad for the 2011 Copa América on 27 May 2011, although he was eventually omitted from the final 23-man squad on 28 June.

On 2 September 2011, Romo made his international debut in a 3–1 win of Chile U25 over Mexico U22 at Alfonso Lastras Stadium, replacing Carlos Muñoz at the 91st minute. On 7 September, he played as a starter in the second game played against Mexico at Estadio La Granja in a 2–2 draw, being also red carded for second yellow card in the 101st minute.

== Post-retirement ==
In mid-2026, Romo began to work as a foreman for a family company.

== Honours ==
Colo-Colo

- Primera División de Chile (3): 2006 Clausura, 2007 Clausura, 2009 Clausura
