= Boris González =

Chilean footballer (born 1980)

Personal information
- Full name: Boris Igor González Garrido
- Date of birth: May 22, 1980 (age 46)
- Place of birth: Talca, Chile
- Height: 1.75 m (5 ft 9 in)
- Position: Right-back

Senior career*
Years	Team	Apps	(Gls)
2001–2002	Rangers	23	(0)
2003–2006	Cobreloa	120	(1)
2007	Colo-Colo	20	(0)
2008	Universidad Católica	11	(0)
2009	Deportes Antofagasta	25	(1)
2010–2012	Cobreloa	70	(0)
2013	Curicó Unido	4	(0)

International career
2003–2007	Chile	7	(0)
- * Club domestic league appearances and goals as of 31 January 2010

Boris Igor González Garrido (born May 22, 1980) is a Chilean footballer, who plays right midfield. He made his professional debut with Chilean club Rangers where he spent his first two seasons. The next four seasons he would spend with Cobreloa, where he would win three championships. He currently plays for Curicó Unido.

== Honours ==
=== Club ===
Cobreloa

- Primera División de Chile (3): 2003 Apertura, 2003 Clausura, 2004 Clausura

Colo-Colo

- Primera División de Chile (2): 2007 Apertura, 2007 Clausura
