= Gonzalo Fierro =

Chilean footballer (born 1983)

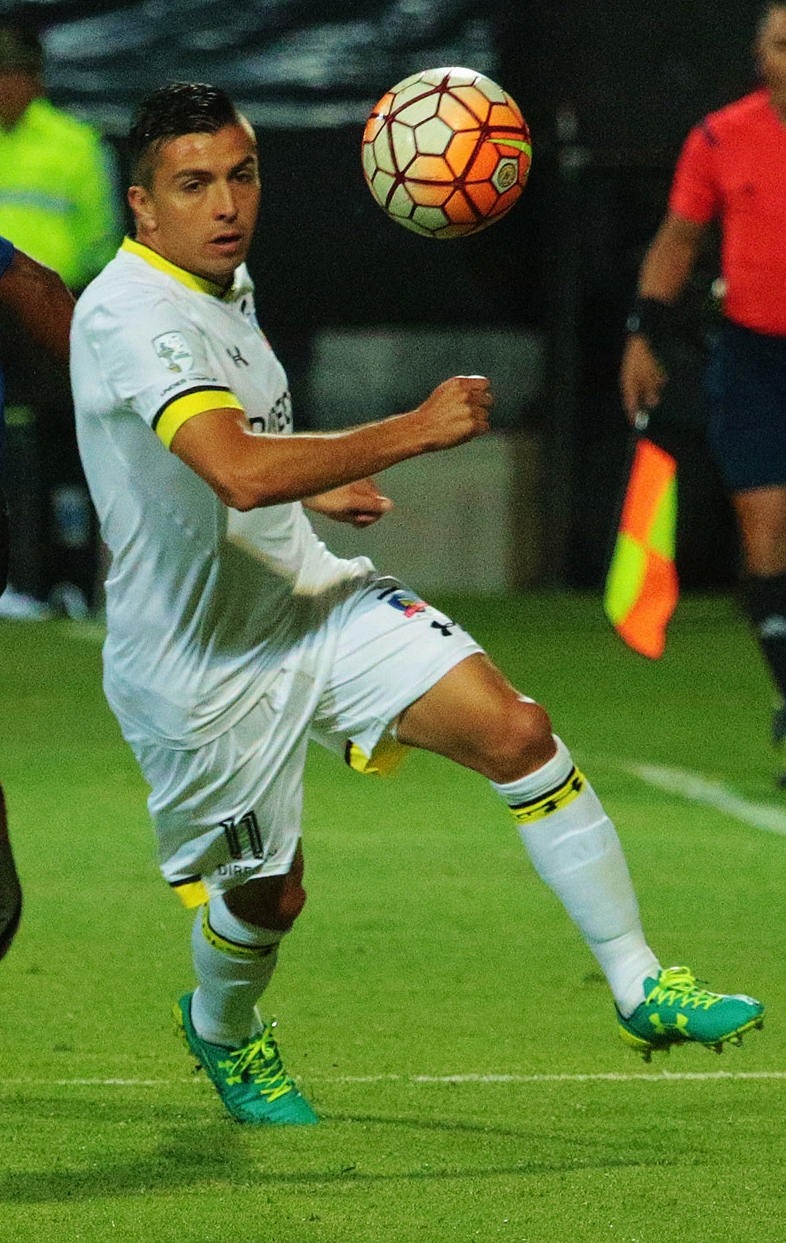
- Fierro with Colo-Colo in 2016

Personal information
- Full name: Gonzalo Antonio Fierro Caniullán
- Date of birth: 21 March 1983 (age 43)
- Place of birth: Santiago, Chile
- Height: 1.71 m (5 ft 7 in)
- Positions: Midfielder; forward

Youth career
- Colo-Colo

Senior career*
Years	Team	Apps	(Gls)
2002–2008	Colo-Colo	213	(61)
2008–2011	Flamengo	47	(1)
2012	Colo-Colo B	1	(0)
2012–2018	Colo-Colo	158	(27)
2019	Deportes Antofagasta	10	(0)
2020–2021	Deportes Colina	20	(5)
Total		449	(94)

International career
2006–2015	Chile	21	(2)
- * Club domestic league appearances and goals

Gonzalo Antonio Fierro Caniullán (born 21 March 1983) is a Chilean former professional footballer who played as a midfielder or forward.

== Club career ==
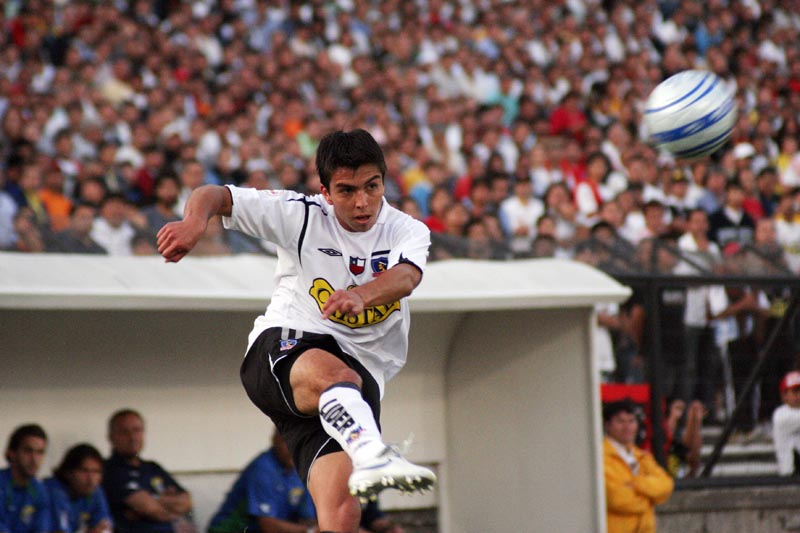
Fierro during the final of Clausura 2006 against Audax Italiano

Fierro began his career at Chilean giants Colo-Colo, being promoted to first-adult team in 2002. Along the seasons, he break into the first team and then he became an undisputed player with Claudio Borghi with whom won four league titles and reached a 2006 Copa Sudamericana runner-up, all of active way.

On 26 August 2008, Fierro joined Brazilian powerhouse Flamengo becoming the first Chilean player on join the club. Nevertheless, he only completed eight league games in his debut season. In 2009, Fierro had a more active role in the team after being chosen to replace Ibson who left the club on loan, playing 24 games and scoring one goal against 2008 Série A defending champions São Paulo in a 1–1 away draw. That season he helped Flamengo to win the Brasileirão.

On 15 July 2010, was reported that Fierro joined Boca Juniors in an alleged request of Claudio Borghi to the club board. However a serious injury stopped his incorporation and on 17 August it was confirmed that he left the club for return to Rio de Janeiro with Flamengo and start his recuperation.

In 2012, Fierro returned to Colo-Colo. Following Pablo Contreras departure, he became the club's captain and in 2014 he was part of the Torneo Clausura team champion, where he was an undisputed player.

In July 2021, he announced his retirement from the football activity at the age of 38.

== International career ==
In 2006, Fierro received his first international cap and debuted against Colombia on 16 August. The following year he was included in Chile's squad for the 2007 Copa América. On 30 January 2008, he scored his first international goal during a game against South Korea where scored the only one goal of the game in a 1–0 win over the Asians.

Frequently called up by Marcelo Bielsa for the 2010 World Cup qualification, he was chosen into Chile's list of 23 to face South Africa's World Cup. On 9 June, prior Group H opening game against Honduras, Chile played an unofficial friendly against New Zealand where Fierro scored the second goal of his country's 2–0 victory.

== Post-retirement ==
In 2022, Fierro joined TNT Sports Chile as a commentator and analyst of the Primera B de Chile.

== Personal life ==
Both Fierro, whose second last name is Caniullán, and his wife are of Mapuche descent. Due to this, as the Colo-Colo team captain he used to wear an armband with Mapuche motif.

== Career statistics ==
=== Club ===
As of match played on 26 February 2019

Appearances and goals by club, season and competition
Club	Season	League		Cup		Continental		Other		Total	
Club	Season	Apps	Goals	Apps	Goals	Apps	Goals	Apps	Goals	Apps	Goals
Colo-Colo	2002	16	2	—		—		—		16	2
Colo-Colo	2003	37	5	—		4	0	—		42	5
Colo-Colo	2004	30	6	—		6	0	—		36	6
Colo-Colo	2005	28	13	—		0	0	—		28	13
Colo-Colo	2006	38	12	—		10	2	—		48	13
Colo-Colo	2007	37	17	—		12	4	—		49	24
Colo-Colo	2008	27	6	—		6	1	—		33	7
Colo-Colo	Total	213	61	0	0	38	7	0	0	238	68
Flamengo	2008	8	0	—		—		—		8	0
Flamengo	2009	24	1	0	0	1	0	5	0	30	1
Flamengo	2010	4	0	0	0	6	0	12	1	22	1
Flamengo	2011	11	0	0	0	2	0	12	0	25	0
Flamengo	Total	47	1	0	0	9	0	29	1	85	2
Colo-Colo	2012	26	7	3	1	—		—		29	8
Colo-Colo	2013	14	4	—		—		—		14	4
Colo-Colo	2013–14	28	7	6	4	4	0	—		38	11
Colo-Colo	2014–15	30	3	5	1	6	0	—		41	4
Colo-Colo	2015–16	26	6	12	3	6	0	—		44	9
Colo-Colo	2016–17	20	0	9	0	6	0	—		35	0
Colo-Colo	2017	1	0	2	1	2	0	—		5	1
Colo-Colo	2018	14	0	2	1	5	0	0	0	21	1
Colo-Colo	Total	159	27	39	11	29	0	0	0	227	38
Deportes Antofagasta	2019	1	0	0	0	—		—		1	0
Career total		420	89	39	11	76	7	29	1	564	108

=== International ===
Goal	Date	Venue	Opponent	Score	Result	Competition
1	30 January 2008	Seoul World Cup Stadium, Seoul, South Korea	South Korea	0–1	0–1	Friendly
2	9 June 2010	Kanyamazane Stadium, Mpumalanga, South Africa	New Zealand	0–1	0–2	Friendly

== Honours ==
Colo-Colo

- Primera División de Chile (8): 2002–C, 2006–A, 2006–C, 2007–A, 2007–C, 2014–C, 2015–A, 2017 Transición
- Copa Sudamericana runner-up: 2006
- Copa Chile: 2016
- Supercopa de Chile: 2017, 2018

Flamengo

- Campeonato Carioca: 2009, 2011
- Campeonato Brasileiro Série A: 2009

Individual

- Primera División de Chile top scorer: 2005–C
