= Oscar Wirth =

Chilean footballer (born 1955)

Personal information
- Full name: Oscar Raúl Wirth Lafuente
- Date of birth: 5 November 1955 (age 70)
- Place of birth: Santiago, Chile
- Height: 1.84 m (6 ft 0 in)
- Position: Goalkeeper

Senior career*
Years	Team	Apps	(Gls)
1973–1979	Universidad Católica		
1979	Colo-Colo		
1980–1982	Cobreloa		
1982–1983	Everton		
1983–1985	Universidad de Chile		
1985	Provincial Osorno		
1985–1986	Rot-Weiß Oberhausen		
1986–1988	Real Valladolid		
1988	Independiente Medellín		
1989–1990	Deportes La Serena		
1991	Deportes Concepción		
1992-1993	Universidad Católica		
1994	Alianza Lima		

International career
1980–1989	Chile	12	(0)
1985	Chile XI	5	(0)
1985	Chile A-2		

Managerial career
- Universidad Católica B
- Cobreloa (gk coach)
- 2003–2005: Chile (assistant)
- 2011: Iberia
- 2015: Audax Italiano (youth)
- 2017–2018: Chile U20 (women)
- 2020–2021: Chile U20 (gk coach)
- * Club domestic league appearances and goals

Oscar Raúl Wirth Lafuente (born 5 November 1955) is a Chilean football manager and former football goalkeeper who played for Cobreloa (Chile), Rot-Weiß Oberhausen (West Germany), and Real Valladolid (Spain) during his professional career.

== International career ==
Wirth represented Chile at the 1982 FIFA World Cup, wearing the number one jersey. For Chile he played 12 matches, making his debut on 24 June 1980 in a friendly against Brazil. In addition, he made appearances for the B-team, named Chile XI, in the friendly tournament 1985 Indonesian Independence Cup, where Chile became champion, and the Los Angeles Nations Cup.

== Managerial career ==
After working for Universidad Católica in the B-team and as the goalkeeping coach of Cobreloa, he joined the technical staff of Juvenal Olmos in the Chile national team. During 2011 he was the head coach of Iberia in the Chilean Tercera A and next he worked in the youth team of Audax Italiano.

After steps with Chile U20, women and men, between 2017 and 2021, he assumed as the Sport Director of Cobreloa for the 2022 season.

== Personal life ==
His father, Fernando, was a defender who played for Santiago Morning and his older brother, Erwin, took part of Chile at under-20 level in the 1971 South American Championship. His children are also athletes since his son, Rainer, is a former professional footballer who played as a goalkeeper and his daughter, Beatriz, is a Chile international field hockey goalkeeper.

== Honours ==
Universidad Católica

- Chilean Segunda División: 1975

Colo-Colo

- Chilean Primera División: 1979

Cobreloa

- Chilean Primera División: 1980, 1982

Chile

- Indonesian Independence Cup: 1985
