= Gustavo Biscayzacú =

Uruguayan footballer (born 1978)

Personal information
- Full name: Gustavo Javier Biscayzacú Perea
- Date of birth: 5 October 1978 (age 48)
- Place of birth: Montevideo, Uruguay
- Height: 1.72 m (5 ft 8 in)
- Position: Forward

Senior career*
Years	Team	Apps	(Gls)
1997–1999	Defensor Sporting	45	(8)
2000	Fernández Vial	26	(18)
2001	Santiago Morning	28	(23)
2002	Jaén	10	(1)
2002	Melbourne Knights	11	(7)
2003	Unión Española	35	(31)
2004–2006	Veracruz	81	(40)
2006–2007	Atlante F.C.	32	(15)
2007–2008	Colo-Colo	37	(20)
2008	Necaxa	9	(2)
2009	Nacional	16	(8)
2010	Portuguesa	4	(3)
2010–2011	River Plate UY	9	(1)
2011–2012	Deportivo Cali	41	(11)
2013	Deportes Quindio	10	(1)
2014	El Tanque Sisley	3	(0)
2015–2016	Boston River	15	(4)
Total		412	(193)

Managerial career
- 2019: Villa Teresa
- 2020: Racing Montevideo
- * Club domestic league appearances and goals as of 2 May 2021

Gustavo Javier Biscayzacú Perea (born 5 October 1978, in Montevideo, Uruguay), nicknamed Grillito (little cricket), is a Uruguayan retired footballer and current manager of Racing Club de Montevideo.

== Career ==
His début came on 14 September 1997, with the Uruguay club Defensor Sporting and his team won 3–2 against Club Atlético Peñarol. He then spent time in Australia, Spain, and Chile. In 2003 with Chilean club Unión Española, Biscayzacú was named by IFFHS as the fourth leading goal scorer in the world for the year with 31 goals. He has spent time with nine different clubs, most recently with Nacional of Uruguay, where he has the record of being the second player to score a hat-trick in a game versus archrivals Peñarol. On 6 January 2010, he signed with Associação Portuguesa de Desportos of Brazil.

After a short period in a Brazilian club, he signed with Uruguayan club River Plate, and then moved to Colombia to play for Deportivo Cali.

== Coaching career ==
On 20 January 2020, Biscayzacú was appointed manager of Uruguayan Primera División club Racing Club de Montevideo.

== Personal life ==
Gustavo's son, Xavier Biscayzacú is also a professional footballer and is a youth international for Mexico.

== Honours ==
=== Club ===
Colo-Colo

- Primera División de Chile (1): 2007 Clausura
