= José Salcedo (Chilean footballer) =

Chilean footballer (born 1980)

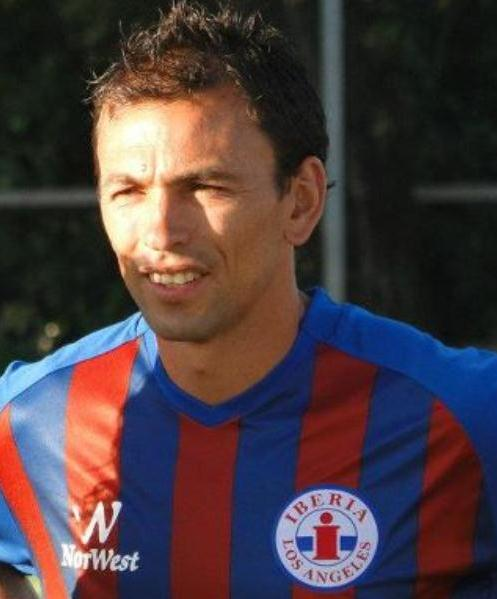

Personal information
- Full name: José Gastón Salcedo Contreras
- Date of birth: 12 January 1980 (age 46)
- Place of birth: Quillota, Chile
- Height: 1.78 m (5 ft 10 in)
- Position: Midfielder

Youth career
- Real Victoria

Senior career*
Years	Team	Apps	(Gls)
2003	Iberia	13	(1)
2003	Malleco Unido	–	(–)
2004–2007	Lota Schwager	168	(15)
2008–2009	Unión Española	14	(0)
2010	Lota Schwager	32	(2)
2011	Rangers	33	(0)
2012–2018	Deportes Iberia	145	(3)
2017	→ Cobreloa (loan)	14	(0)
Total		360+	(21+)
- * Club domestic league appearances and goals as of 7 February 2018

José Gastón Salcedo Contreras (born 12 January 1980) is a Chilean retired footballer who played as a midfielder. His last club was Deportes Iberia.

== Political career ==
Salcedo was elected a councillor for Los Ángeles commune in the 2021 Chilean municipal elections as a member of Radical Party of Chile.
