= Cristián Abarca =

Chilean footballer (born 1989)

Personal information
- Full name: Cristián Felipe Abarca Foncea
- Date of birth: 20 May 1989 (age 37)
- Place of birth: Santiago, Chile
- Height: 1.75 m (5 ft 9 in)
- Position: Midfielder

Youth career
- 2001–2006: Colo-Colo

Senior career*
Years	Team	Apps	(Gls)
2006–2008	Colo-Colo	7	(1)
2007	→ Universidad de Concepción (loan)	0	(0)
2008	→ San Luis (loan)	41	(2)
2009	Magallanes	–	(–)
2010	O'Higgins	8	(1)
2011	Rangers	1	(0)
2012	Provincial Osorno	–	(–)
2012	Trasandino	–	(–)
2012–2013	San Antonio Unido	36	(5)
2014	Deportes Melipilla	13	(1)
2018	Puma Generaleña	–	(–)
Total		106	(10)

International career
2004	Chile U15	3	(0)
2005	Chile U17	4	(1)
- * Club domestic league appearances and goals

Cristián Felipe Abarca Foncea (born 20 May 1989) is a Chilean former footballer who played as a midfielder.

== Career ==
He played for clubs including Colo-Colo and the Rangers of the Primera B.

In his last years, Abarca played for San Antonio Unido and Deportes Melipilla.

Abroad, Abarca had a stint with Puma Generaleña in the 2018–19 Segunda División de Costa Rica, where he coincided with his compatriots Juan Pablo Arenas and Bastián Lecaros.

== Statistics ==
=== Teams ===
Teams by season
Year(s)	Team
2006-2007	Colo-Colo
2010	O'Higgins
2011	Rangers
2012	Trasandino
2012-2013	San Antonio Unido
2014	Deportes Melipilla

=== Trophies ===
Trophies by season
Season(s)	League	Trophy
2011	Primera B	Winner
2012	Tercera A	Winner
2013-2014	Segunda División	Runner-up
