= José Luis García (footballer, born 1985) =

Argentine footballer

Personal information
- Full name: José Luis García
- Date of birth: 18 April 1985 (age 41)
- Place of birth: Isidro Casanova, Argentina
- Height: 1.76 m (5 ft 9 in)
- Position: Midfielder

Team information
- Current team: Almirante Brown

Youth career
- 1997–2003: San Lorenzo

Senior career*
Years	Team	Apps	(Gls)
2003–2005	San Lorenzo	2	(0)
2005–2006	Olimpo	6	(0)
2006	Monarcas Morelia	10	(1)
2007	Universidad de Chile	10	(1)
2007	Sportivo Luqueño	12	(1)
2008	Municipal Liberia	11	(0)
2008	Timişoara	2	(0)
2009	Gloria Buzău	3	(0)
2009–2012	Almirante Brown	75	(9)
2012	Rosario Central	7	(0)
2013	Almirante Brown	10	(1)
2013–2014	Patronato	27	(3)
2014–2016	Instituto	49	(1)
2016	Acassuso	13	(1)
2017–2018	Deportes Magallanes	41	(6)
2019–	Almirante Brown	63	(2)
- * Club domestic league appearances and goals as of 19:37, 8 June 2022 (UTC)

José Luis García (Spanish pronunciation: [xoˌse ˈlwis ɣaɾˈsi.a]; born 18 April 1985) is an Argentinian footballer who plays as a midfielder for Almirante Brown.
