= Alex Díaz (footballer, born 1989) =

Colombian footballer (born 1989)

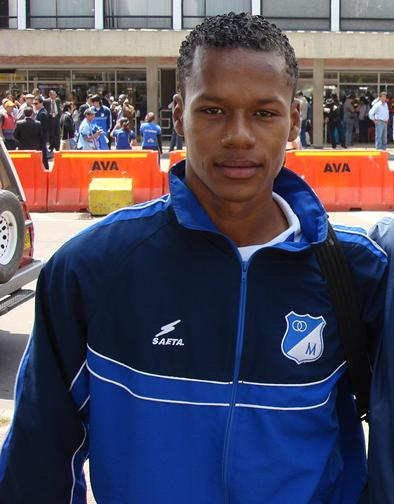

Personal information
- Full name: Alex Díaz Díaz
- Date of birth: January 13, 1989 (age 37)
- Place of birth: Bahía Solano, Chocó, Colombia
- Height: 1.67 m (5 ft 6 in)
- Position: Defender

Team information
- Current team: Millonarios FC

Youth career
- 2006–2007: Millonarios FC

Senior career*
| Years | Team | Apps | (Gls) |
| 2007–2011 | Millonarios FC | 47 | (0) |
| 2012 | America de Cali | 5 | (0) |
| 2012– | Millonarios FC | 51 | (0) |

International career
| 2009 | Colombia U-20 | 9 | (0) |
- * Club domestic league appearances and goals as of April 13, 2013

Alex Díaz (born January 13, 1989) is a Colombian football defender who currently plays for Millonarios FC in the Categoría Primera A. Díaz is a product of the Millonarios youth system and played with the Millonarios first team since July, 2007.He is a starter on Millonarios who reached the Semi-finals of the Copa Sudamericana 2007 . After a short term at America de Cali in 2012, he returns to Millonarios for the second half of the year.

== Statistics (Official games/Colombian Ligue and Colombian Cup) ==
(As of November 14, 2010)

| Year | Team | Colombian Ligue Matches | Goals | Colombian Cup Matches | Goals | Total Matches | Total Goals |
|---|---|---|---|---|---|---|---|
| 2007 | Millonarios | 12 | 0 | 0 | 0 | 12 | 0 |
| 2008 | Millonarios | 10 | 0 | 6 | 0 | 16 | 0 |
| 2009 | Millonarios | 18 | 0 | 6 | 0 | 24 | 0 |
| 2010 | Millonarios | 2 | 0 | 0 | 0 | 2 | 0 |
| Total | Millonarios | 42 | 0 | 12 | 0 | 54 | 0 |
