= José Luis Jerez =

Chilean footballer (born 1978)

Personal information
- Full name: José Luis Jerez Cerna
- Date of birth: 26 June 1978 (age 48)
- Place of birth: Santiago, Chile
- Height: 1.65 m (5 ft 5 in)
- Position: Left midfielder

Youth career
- Unión Española

Senior career*
Years	Team	Apps	(Gls)
1996–2005	Unión Española	177	(32)
1998–1999	→ Ñublense (loan)		
2006–2007	Colo-Colo	41	(5)
2007–2009	Ethnikos Piraeus	42	(10)
2008	Panserraikos	7	(0)
2010–2011	Cobreloa	31	(2)
2011–2012	Deportes La Serena	30	(1)

International career
2003	Chile	1	(0)

Managerial career
- Unión Española (youth)
- * Club domestic league appearances and goals

José Luis Jerez Cerna (born 26 June 1978) is a Chilean former professional football midfielder. In his prime, Jerez was known for his explosiveness and ball skills.

== Club career ==
=== Chile ===
Jerez began his career with Chilean club Unión Española. He debuted for Unión Española in 1996. During the 1998 season, Jerez was loaned out to Primera B club Ñublense. He returned the following season to Unión Española where he spent the next six years appearing in 146 games and scoring 30 goals and winning the 2005 Apertura Championship.

In January 2006, Jerez joined Chile's most successful club, Colo-Colo, which was then coached by Claudio Borghi. In his time with Colo-Colo, Jerez won three championships.

=== Greece ===
In summer 2007, Jerez joined Ethnikos Piraeus F.C. and immediately became a key player for the club, making 27 starts (29 total appearances) and scoring 6 goals in his first season.

In July 2008 Ethnikos sold Jerez to newly promoted Greek Super League side Panserraikos.

Jerez made just seven league appearances for Panserraikos, and in January 2009 he returned to Ethnikos Piraeus.

=== Return to Chile ===
In January 2010, Jerez signed for Cobreloa. His last club was Deportes La Serena in 2012.

== International career ==
He made an appearance for the Chile national team in 2003 in a friendly match versus China.

== Post-retirement ==
After his retirement, Jerez graduated as a football manager and has played football at amateur level in clubs such as Club Deportivo Jadrán. As a football coach, he has worked for the Unión Española youth ranks and other academies.

In 2021, Jerez emigrated to New York, United States, looking for some opportunities in football coaching. He was supported by his former fellow footballer Omar Riquelme and worked as a painter at the same time he played football at amateur level. Back to Chile, he assumed as coach for the football academies of the Municipality of Lo Barnechea.

== Honours ==
Unión Española

- Chilean Primera División: 2005 Apertura

Colo-Colo

- Chilean Primera División: 2006 Apertura, 2006 Clausura, 2007 Apertura
