= Juan Carlos Quintero =

Colombian footballer (born 1978)

Personal information
- Full name: Juan Carlos Quintero Pérez
- Date of birth: February 20, 1978 (age 48)
- Place of birth: Medellín, Colombia
- Height: 1.74 m (5 ft 9 in)
- Position: Midfielder

Senior career*
Years	Team	Apps	(Gls)
1999	Envigado		
1999–2000	Deportes Quindío		
2001	Deportivo Pereira		
2002–2004	Atlético Bucaramanga		
2004–2005	Atlético Junior	53	(7)
2006–2007	Millonarios	41	(0)
2008	Independiente Medellín	28	(4)
2009–2011	Independiente Santa Fe	79	(2)
2011	→ Atlético Huila (loan)	16	(0)
2012	La Equidad	39	(0)
2013	Cúcuta Deportivo	14	(0)
2013–14	Envigado	43	(2)
- * Club domestic league appearances and goals

Juan Carlos Quintero Pérez (born February 20, 1978) is a Colombian retired footballer who played as a midfielder.

He began his career coming up from Envigado's youth ranks and made his professional debut in the 1999 season. He played at many top Colombian clubs like Millonarios, Atlético Junior, Independiente Medellín, and Independiente Santa Fe.

Some of the best spells of his career were at Junior, where he was part of the championship squad in the 2004 Clausura, and with Independiente Santa Fe where he won the 2009 Copa Colombia. He was also an important player in his sole season with Independiente Medellín in 2008, where he scored important goals in the latter stages of the season to help the team reach the finals, like the winner in a match against La Equidad, where they eventually finished runner-up to America de Cali.

Quintero played for Colombia at the 1993 FIFA World Youth Championship in Australia aged 15.
