= Giovanni Hernández =

Colombian footballer and manager (born 1976)

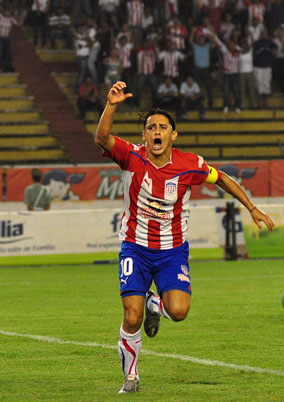
- Hernández playing for Junior in 2010

Personal information
- Full name: Giovanni Hernández Soto
- Date of birth: 17 June 1976 (age 50)
- Place of birth: Cali, Colombia
- Height: 1.72 m (5 ft 8 in)
- Position: Midfielder

Youth career
- 1986–1993: Boca Juniors de Cali

Senior career*
Years	Team	Apps	(Gls)
1993–1995	Once Caldas	28	(11)
1995–1996	América de Cali	68	(6)
1996–1999	Independiente Medellín	111	(20)
2000–2003	Deportivo Cali	146	(32)
2003–2006	Colón de Santa Fe	124	(14)
2007–2008	Colo-Colo	39	(13)
2008–2012	Junior	203	(52)
2013–2014	Independiente Medellín	46	(5)
2014	Uniautónoma	11	(0)
Total		781	(154)

International career^{‡}
1995–2009	Colombia	46	(5)

Managerial career
- 2015: Uniautónoma
- 2016: Real Cartagena
- 2016: Junior
- 2018–2023: Atlético
Medal record
Men's football
Representing Colombia
Copa América
Winner	2001 Colombia
- * Club domestic league appearances and goals as of 29 January 2015 ‡ National team caps and goals as of 17 November 2010

Giovanni Andrés Hernández Soto (Spanish pronunciation: [ɟʝoˈβanj eɾˈnandes ˈsoto]; born 17 June 1976), is a Colombian football manager and former player. He is the current manager of Atlético F.C. in the Colombian Categoría Primera B, and formerly managed Uniautónoma, Real Cartagena and Junior.

Before his career as a coach, he played as a midfielder and was famous for his technical skills and ability to create chances as a playmaker, as well as his penchant for setting-up goals from free kicks.

== Club career ==
=== Early career ===
Giovanni Hernández made his professional debut at the age of 17 with Once Caldas in 1993. In 1995, he played for América de Cali and he scored 5 goals during this season. He continued playing for the club during the 1996 Copa Libertadores where he scored 2 goals. He played for Independiente Medellín during 1998. At the end of that year, he was signed by Deportivo Cali.

=== Deportivo Cali ===
He played for Deportivo Cali in the 1999 Copa Libertadores as a substitute, but after a few goals he became a starter for the 2001 season, where he scored 13 goals.

=== Colón ===
In the second half of 2003, Hernández was sold to Argentine club Colón de Santa Fe. In his debut match on 12 August, he scored a free kick goal and made an assist, in a 3–1 victory against Velez Sarsfield as part of the first stage of the 2003 Copa Sudamericana. He quickly became one of the favorites in the Argentine league, scoring a total of 12 goals that season.

=== Colo-Colo ===
On 15 January 2007, Hernandez joined Chilean club Colo-Colo on a one-year contract with a transfer fee of $800,000. He was brought in to replace the 2006 South American Player of the Year, Matías Fernández, and was handed the prestigious #10 jersey. He was a vital part of the team that would eventually win the 2007 Apertura championship, being the second top scoring of the team with 7 goals. Colo-Colo also won the 2007 Clausura, with Hernandez being part of the squad, and scoring 6 goals.

At the end of the year, Colo-Colo's president wanted him to stay at the club, but Hernandez told the press, "I asked for a Coca-Cola, but I got water with gas" meaning that he had certain terms that he asked for, but the club could not meet them.

=== Junior ===
After receiving offers from Barcelona of Ecuador and Necaxa of Mexico, in January 2008, the midfielder went back to Colombia to play for Junior de Barranquilla, signing a three-year contract and becoming the most expensive transfer made by the team at that time. When Hernandez arrived, Junior were close to being relegated, because the team had very poor 2006 and 2007 seasons. Junior also had a poor 2008 Apertura season, failing to qualify for the playoffs, but in the 2008 Finalizacion, with the help of Hernandez and other new signings, Junior reached the playoffs and avoided relegation as well.

In the 2009 Apertura, he scored 5 goals to help Junior reach the finals, where they lost to Once Caldas. He had a great 2009 Clausura season, scoring nine goals in 15 games, including a streak of five consecutive games scoring. His goals helped Junior make the playoffs, but he failed to score any in the playoffs and Junior eventually missed out on the finals. Junior won the 2010 Apertura, which was his first title with the club. In December 2010, Universitario of the Peruvian Primera División made an offer for him, but Hernandez declined, expressing his desire to stay in Barranquilla. After declining the offer, he signed a two-year contract extension.

In the 2011 Clausura, Junior qualified for the playoffs, and faced Millonarios in the semi-finals. Junior lost the first leg 3–0, but in the second leg Junior came back and won 3–0, with Hernandez scoring the goal to tie the series. He later scored his penalty in the shootout, which Junior won to qualify to the final. In the finals, Junior won the first leg 3–2. In the second leg on 21 December, Once Caldas won 2-1 and tied the series, sending the game into penalties. He assisted Carlos Bacca's goal and scored his penalty in the shootout to win his second title with Junior.

In December 2012, Hernandez told Junior's president that he wished to stay at the club and renovate his contract for two more years. However, the club only gave him the option to renovate his contract for one year, and he left the club that month.

=== Independiente Medellin ===
On 20 December 2012, he returned to Independiente Medellín, the club he played for from 1996 to 1999.

In September 2013, he had an argument with manager Pedro Sarmiento after being subbed off early in a loss against Boyaca Chico and not being included in the squad in the following match against Atlético Nacional. However, everything was settled quickly and he resumed training within a few days. At the end of the 2014 Apertura, Hernandez left the club.

=== Uniautonoma ===
In June 2014, Hernandez joined Uniautónoma for the 2014 Finalizacion tournament.

== International career ==
Hernández was called up to the Colombia national team for the 2001 Copa América, which they won. Colombia did not qualify for the 2002 FIFA World Cup but did qualify for the 2003 Confederations Cup where he was called up again. Giovanni scored 3 goals in 5 games and he was considered one of the best players of the tournament. He played in the 2003 CONCACAF Gold Cup with a lacklustre performance, not scoring a single goal.

After a three-year absence from the Colombia national team, Giovanni was recalled for the match against Mexico on 22 August 2007.

== Personal life ==
He was part of the group of Deportivo Cali players that was struck by lightning in 2002, spending some time in the ICU, but made a full recovery.

In September 2010, it was reported that Hernandez failed to pay approximately 865,000 pesos ($215,000) to the Argentine government while he was playing for Colon in 2005.

== Career statistics ==
=== International goals ===
Giovanni Hernández: International goals
No.	Date	Venue	Opponent	Score	Result	Competition
1	23 July 2001	Estadio Centenario, Armenia, Colombia	Peru	2–0	3–0	Copa America 2001
2	20 June 2003	Stade de Gerland, Lyon, France	New Zealand	3–1	3–1	Confederations Cup
3	22 June 2003	Stade Geoffroy-Guichard, Saint-Etienne, France	Japan	0–1	0–1	Confederations Cup
4	28 June 2003	Stade Geoffroy-Guichard, Saint-Etienne, France	Turkey	1–1	1–2	Confederations Cup
5	30 April 2008	Estadio Alfonso López, Bucaramanga, Colombia	Venezuela	3–2	5–2	Exhibition game

== Honours ==
América de Cali

- Copa Libertadores runner-up: 1996

Colo-Colo

- Primera División de Chile: 2007 Apertura, 2007 Clausura

Junior

- Colombian Primera A: 2010 Apertura, 2011 Finalización

Colombia

- Copa América: 2001

Individual

- CONCACAF Gold Cup Best XI: 2003

Sporting positions
Preceded by Hayder Palacio	Atlético Junior captain 2008–2012	Succeeded by Sebastián Viera
