= Julio Gutiérrez (footballer) =

Chilean footballer (born 1979)

Personal information
- Full name: Julio Brian Gutiérrez González
- Date of birth: September 14, 1979 (age 47)
- Place of birth: Santiago, Chile
- Height: 1.72 m (5 ft 7 1/2 in)
- Position: Forward

Team information
- Current team: Udinese Primavera (head coach)

Senior career*
Years	Team	Apps	(Gls)
1999–2000	Unión Española	43	(21)
2001–2005	Udinese	8	(0)
2002	→ Messina (loan)	40	(4)
2003–2004	→ Pescara (loan)	12	(0)
2004	→ Sambenedettese (loan)	16	(0)
2005	→ Grosseto (loan)	10	(0)
2005–2006	Indios	41	(6)
2006–2007	Unión Española	34	(14)
2007–2008	Universidad Católica	42	(19)
2009–2010	Santa Fe	37	(10)
2010–2011	Deportivo Táchira	26	(8)
2011–2013	Mineros de Guayana	45	(11)
Total		354	(93)

International career
1999	Chile U20	8	(1)
2000	Chile U23	5	(2)
2000–2007	Chile	5	(0)
2001	Chile B	1	(0)

Managerial career
- 2022–2025: Udinese Primavera (assistant)
- 2025–: Udinese Primavera (head coach)
- * Club domestic league appearances and goals

Julio Brian Gutiérrez González (born September 14, 1979) is a retired Chilean football player. He also spent much time playing in Italy from 2000 to 2005. He is currently the coach of the Udinese Primavera team.

In 2006, Gutiérrez returned to his first club in Chile, Unión Española. His ability led to signing with Universidad Católica and being called up to the national team.

== Club career ==
Gutiérrez began his career with Unión Española, who sold his contract to Italian side Udinese in 2001. He was unable to find many opportunities with the Udinese first team, and went on loan to Messina. Gutiérrez returned to Udinese for a year but was again unable to break into the first team. He went out on loan again, to Pescara, then to Sambenedettese, and finally to Grosseto.

Following his spell in Italy, Gutiérrez joined Indios of the Mexican Primera División A. Next, Gutiérrez returned to Chile to play for the club where he began his career, Unión Española, where he enjoyed two good seasons. Following that success, he transferred to Universidad Católica.

== International career ==
Following his good performances in Unión Española, Gutiérrez was selected for Chile U20 for the 1999 South American Championship. He played with the squad in the pre-Olympic Tournament 2000 in Londrina, Brazil, where he helped Chile qualify for the Olympic Games in Sydney in the same year.

At senior level, he made 5 appearances for the national team. In addition, he made an appearance for Chile B in the friendly match against Catalonia on 28 December 2001.

== Coaching career ==
Gutiérrez started his career as a coach for Italian amateur clubs. Since 2022, he has worked as an assistant coach for the Udinese Primavera team. On 28 July 2025, he was appointed as the head coach until June 2026.

== Honours ==
=== Player ===
Udinese

- Intertoto Cup (1): 2000
