= Rodolfo Moya =

Chilean footballer (born 1979)

Personal information
- Full name: Rodolfo Antonio Moya Spuler
- Date of birth: July 27, 1979 (age 47)
- Place of birth: Concón, Chile
- Height: 1.77 m (5 ft 10 in)
- Position: Forward

Youth career
- Everton

Senior career*
Years	Team	Apps	(Gls)
1994–1997	Everton	6	(1)
1997–2001	Universidad Católica	40	(7)
2002	Austria Wien	5	(0)
2003	Universidad de Chile	25	(5)
2004–2005	Huachipato	39	(9)
2006	Deportes La Serena	28	(8)
2007	Audax Italiano	15	(6)
2007–2010	Colo-Colo	54	(4)
2009	→ Everton (loan)	9	(1)
2010	→ Palestino (loan)	26	(0)
2011	Deportes La Serena	7	(0)
Total		254	(41)

International career
1999–2007	Chile	6	(0)
- * Club domestic league appearances and goals

Rodolfo Antonio Moya Spuler (born July 27, 1979) is a Chilean former professional footballer who played as a forward.

In his career, Moya has played for the three biggest teams in Chile: Universidad Católica, Universidad de Chile, and Colo-Colo.

== Playing career ==
At 15 years, 4 months, and 21 days, Moya made his professional debut with Chilean club Everton in Viña del Mar against Unión Española. Moya spent four years with Everton before moving to Universidad Católica. He would go on to cap five times for Austria Vienna in 2002 before returning to Chile to play for Huachipato, La Serena, and Audax. Moya revived his career during the 2007 Chilean Apertura Tournament, while playing with Audax.

During the 2007 Copa Libertadores, Moya's play almost qualified Audax out of group play. Moya scored three goals during the Libertadores and six during the national tournament. Moya was than sold to Colo-Colo for $300,000. On August 9, 2007, Moya scored his first goal with Colo-Colo in a 3–1 win over Bolivian team Real Potosí in a Copa Sudamericana 2007 match. In July 2009 he was loaned to Everton.

== Personal life ==
His daughters, Josefa and Agustina, have played football for Unión La Calera and Cobresal, respectively.

== Political career ==
A member of National Renewal, Moya was elected as councillor of Concón in the 2016 Municipal elections.

In June 2026, Moya joined the Party of the People.

== Honours ==
Colo-Colo

- Primera División (2): 2007–C, 2008–C
