= 2008 Torneo Clausura (Chile) =

Campeonato Nacional Clausura Copa Banco Estado
- Season: 2008
- Dates: 21 June – 20 December 2008
- Champions: Colo-Colo; 28th title
- Relegated: Provincial Osorno; Deportes Melipilla; Deportes Antofagasta
- 2009 Copa Libertadores: Colo-Colo; Univ. de Chile (Clau. Table)
- Matches: 186
- Goals: 605 (3.25 per match)
- Top goalscorer: Lucas Barrios (19 goals)
- Biggest home win: Dep. La Serena 6–2 Cobreloa (19 July)
- Total attendance: 1,233,447
- Average attendance: 6,631

The 2008 Campeonato Nacional Clausura Copa Banco Estado was the 84th Chilean League top flight, in which Colo-Colo won its 28th league title after beating Palestino in the finals. The format is the same as the Apertura tournament, but the field was reduced from 20 teams to 19 since Deportes Concepción withdrew before the start of the tournament due to financial problems.

== First stage ==
=== Results ===
| | ANT | AUD | CLO | CSA | COL | EVE | HUA | LSE | MEL | ÑUB | OHI | OSO | PAL | RAN | SMO | UES | UCA | UCH | UCO |
|---|---|---|---|---|---|---|---|---|---|---|---|---|---|---|---|---|---|---|---|
| Antofagasta | | 3–0 | | | 1–0 | 0–1 | 0–2 | | 4–2 | | 1–2 | | 0–3 | 2–1 | | 1–1 | 2–3 | | |
| Audax | | | | | | 2–1 | 0–3 | | 2–2 | 1–1 | 1–0 | 1–2 | | 3–0 | | 0–0 | | 0–1 | |
| Cobreloa | 1–2 | 2–1 | | 1–1 | 4–3 | 2–0 | | | 2–0 | | | 4–0 | | 3–0 | | 1–1 | | | |
| Cobresal | 0–0 | 1–2 | | | | | 2–2 | 1–1 | | 1–0 | | | | | 4–1 | | 3–1 | 1–2 | 1–3 |
| Colo-Colo | | 1–1 | | 1–1 | | | | 3–0 | | | | 4–1 | 0–0 | 2–3 | 2–1 | 2–1 | | 2–0 | |
| Everton | | | | 2–0 | 3–1 | | | 5–5 | 2–1 | | | 3–1 | 0–1 | | 0–1 | 2–0 | | | 2–1 |
| Huachipato | | | 1–2 | | 0–2 | 2–1 | | 4–1 | 2–1 | | | | 1–2 | 1–2 | 1–1 | | | | 1–1 |
| La Serena | 2–0 | 1–1 | 6–2 | | | | | | 1–0 | 3–3 | 1–3 | | 3–0 | | | | | 2–2 | 2–1 |
| Melipilla | | | | 1–2 | 0–2 | | | | | 1–1 | 2–1 | 3–1 | 0–2 | 0–1 | 1–5 | | 3–5 | | |
| Ñublense | 2–0 | | 1–1 | | 1–2 | 1–0 | 0–1 | | | | | | 2–1 | 2–2 | | 0–3 | 0–2 | | |
| O'Higgins | | | 1–0 | 3–0 | 0–3 | 4–3 | 3–2 | | | 2–2 | | | | | 4–1 | 5–3 | 1–1 | | 3–3 |
| Osorno | 0–1 | | | 0–3 | | | 3–1 | 1–2 | | 4–1 | 1–1 | | | | 0–1 | 1–2 | 2–4 | 1–2 | |
| Palestino | | 1–0 | 3–4 | 3–1 | | | | | | | 2–3 | 1–0 | | | 1–1 | | | 0–3 | 3–1 |
| Rangers | | | | 2–1 | | 2–0 | | 2–1 | | | 3–1 | 1–0 | 1–1 | | | | | 1–0 | 2–3 |
| S. Morning | 2–1 | 3–5 | 3–1 | | | | | 3–2 | | 2–2 | | | | 1–1 | | 1–2 | 1–0 | 0–3 | |
| U. Española | | | | 1–1 | | | 3–2 | 2–3 | 1–0 | | | | 1–3 | 2–1 | | | 1–4 | 1–4 | 3–1 |
| U. Católica | | 2–4 | 4–3 | | 1–0 | 0–1 | 0–4 | 1–1 | | | | | 1–2 | 2–0 | | | | | |
| U. de Chile | 3–0 | | 3–1 | | | 1–2 | 1–3 | | 4–1 | 2–1 | 5–3 | | | | | | 2–1 | | 1–1 |
| U. Concepción | 3–1 | 1–1 | 2–0 | | 1–2 | | | | 0–1 | 1–1 | | 4–1 | | | 2–2 | | 3–5 | | |

=== Table ===
| Pos | Team | Pld | W | D | L | GF | GA | GD | Pts | Qualification |
|---|---|---|---|---|---|---|---|---|---|---|
| 1 | Universidad de Chile | 18 | 12 | 2 | 4 | 39 | 21 | +18 | 38 | 2009 Copa Libertadores First Stage |
| 2 | Colo-Colo | 18 | 10 | 3 | 5 | 32 | 19 | +13 | 33 | |
| 3 | Palestino | 18 | 10 | 3 | 5 | 29 | 22 | +7 | 33 | |
| 4 | Rangers | 18 | 9 | 3 | 6 | 25 | 25 | 0 | 30 | |
| 5 | Universidad Católica | 18 | 9 | 2 | 7 | 37 | 33 | +4 | 29 | |
| 6 | Everton | 18 | 9 | 1 | 8 | 28 | 25 | +3 | 28 | |
| 7 | O'Higgins | 18 | 8 | 4 | 6 | 39 | 35 | +4 | 28 | |
| 8 | Huachipato | 18 | 8 | 3 | 7 | 33 | 25 | +8 | 27 | |
| 9 | Cobreloa | 18 | 8 | 3 | 7 | 34 | 32 | +2 | 27 | |
| 10 | Deportes La Serena | 18 | 7 | 6 | 5 | 37 | 34 | +3 | 27 | |
| 11 | Santiago Morning | 18 | 7 | 5 | 6 | 30 | 32 | −2 | 26 | |
| 12 | Unión Española | 18 | 7 | 4 | 7 | 27 | 31 | −4 | 25 | |
| 13 | Audax Italiano | 18 | 6 | 6 | 6 | 25 | 25 | 0 | 24 | |
| 14 | Deportes Antofagasta | 18 | 7 | 2 | 9 | 20 | 27 | −7 | 23 | |
| 15 | Universidad de Concepción | 18 | 5 | 6 | 7 | 32 | 32 | 0 | 21 | |
| 16 | Cobresal | 18 | 5 | 6 | 7 | 24 | 26 | −2 | 21 | |
| 17 | Ñublense | 18 | 3 | 8 | 7 | 21 | 29 | −8 | 17 | |
| 18 | Deportes Melipilla | 18 | 3 | 2 | 13 | 19 | 38 | −19 | 11 | |
| 19 | Provincial Osorno | 18 | 3 | 1 | 14 | 20 | 40 | −20 | 10 | |

Updated to match(es) played on November 9, 2008. Source: RSSSF
Rules for classification: 1) points; 2) goal difference; 3) number of goals scored.

=== Group standings ===
==== Group 1 ====
| Pos | Team | Pld | W | D | L | GF | GA | GD | Pts | Qualification |
|---|---|---|---|---|---|---|---|---|---|---|
| 1 | Universidad de Chile | 18 | 12 | 2 | 4 | 39 | 21 | +18 | 38 | Playoffs |
| 2 | Colo-Colo | 18 | 10 | 3 | 5 | 32 | 19 | +13 | 33 | Playoffs |
| 3 | Unión Española | 18 | 7 | 4 | 7 | 28 | 32 | −4 | 25 | |
| 4 | Ñublense | 18 | 3 | 8 | 7 | 21 | 29 | −8 | 17 | |

==== Group 2 ====
| Pos | Team | Pld | W | D | L | GF | GA | GD | Pts | Qualification |
|---|---|---|---|---|---|---|---|---|---|---|
| 1 | Rangers | 18 | 9 | 3 | 6 | 25 | 25 | 0 | 30 | Playoffs |
| 2 | Universidad Católica | 18 | 9 | 2 | 7 | 37 | 33 | +4 | 29 | Playoffs |
| 3 | Everton | 18 | 9 | 1 | 8 | 28 | 25 | +3 | 28 | Play-off Match |
| 4 | Deportes La Serena | 18 | 7 | 6 | 5 | 37 | 34 | +3 | 27 | |
| 5 | Provincial Osorno | 18 | 3 | 1 | 14 | 18 | 38 | −20 | 10 | |

==== Group 3 ====
| Pos | Team | Pld | W | D | L | GF | GA | GD | Pts | Qualification |
|---|---|---|---|---|---|---|---|---|---|---|
| 1 | Palestino | 18 | 10 | 3 | 5 | 29 | 22 | +7 | 33 | Playoffs |
| 2 | O'Higgins | 18 | 8 | 4 | 6 | 39 | 35 | +4 | 28 | Playoffs |
| 3 | Santiago Morning | 18 | 7 | 5 | 6 | 30 | 32 | −2 | 26 | |
| 4 | Universidad de Concepción | 18 | 5 | 6 | 7 | 32 | 32 | 0 | 21 | |
| 5 | Deportes Melipilla | 18 | 3 | 2 | 13 | 19 | 38 | −19 | 11 | |

==== Group 4 ====
| Pos | Team | Pld | W | D | L | GF | GA | GD | Pts | Qualification |
|---|---|---|---|---|---|---|---|---|---|---|
| 1 | Huachipato | 18 | 8 | 3 | 7 | 34 | 32 | +2 | 27 | Playoffs |
| 2 | Cobreloa | 18 | 8 | 3 | 7 | 34 | 32 | +2 | 27 | Play-off Match |
| 3 | Audax Italiano | 18 | 6 | 6 | 6 | 25 | 25 | 0 | 24 | |
| 4 | Deportes Antofagasta | 18 | 7 | 2 | 9 | 20 | 27 | −7 | 23 | |
| 5 | Cobresal | 18 | 5 | 6 | 7 | 24 | 26 | −2 | 21 | |

Updated to match(es) played on November 9, 2008. Source: RSSSF
Rules for classification: 1) points; 2) goal difference; 3) number of goals scored.

==== Play-off match ====
| Team 1 | Score | Team 2 |
|---|---|---|
| Everton | 0–3 | Cobreloa |

=== Knock-out round ===
The clubs were seeded by their first phase standings.

Quarterfinals
8 | Cobreloa | 3 | 2 | 5
1 | Universidad de Chile | 0 | 3 | 3
7 | Huachipato | 1 | 2 | 3
2 | Colo-Colo | 1 | 4 | 5
6 | O'Higgins | 2 | 1 | 3
3 | Palestino | 2 | 2 | 4
5 | Universidad Católica | 3 | 1 | 4
4 | Rangers | 3 | 1 | 4

Semifinals
8 | Cobreloa | 3 | 2 | 5
2 | Colo-Colo | 3 | 2 | 5
3 | Palestino | 0 | 2 | 2
4 | Rangers | 0 | 2 | 2

Final
2 | Colo-Colo | 1 | 3 | 4
3 | Palestino | 1 | 1 | 2

Primera Division
2008 Clausura champions

28th title

Colo-Colo qualified to the 2009 Copa Libertadores Second Stage.

=== Top goalscorers ===
| P | Player | Team | Goals |
|---|---|---|---|
| 1 | (Argentina) Lucas Barrios | Colo-Colo | 18 |
| 2 | (Argentina) Gastón Cellerino | Rangers | 16 |
| 2 | (Paraguay) Nestor Bareiro | O'Higgins | 16 |
| 4 | (Chile) Julio Gutiérrez | Universidad Católica | 12 |
| 5 | (Argentina) Gustavo Canales | Deportes La Serena | 10 |
| 5 | (Chile) Leonardo Monje | Huachipato | 10 |
| 5 | (Argentina) Gustavo Savoia | Cobreloa | 10 |

== Relegation ==
| Pos | Team | Pts |
|---|---|---|
| 15 | Unión Española | 47.33 |
| 16 | Universidad de Concepción | 45.66 |
| 17 | Deportes Antofagasta | 42.63 |
| 18 | Deportes Melipilla | 33.87 |
| 19 | Provincial Osorno | 26.56 |

Updated to match(es) played on unknown. Source: rsssf.com
Note: Points were computed using 38% of 2007 points plus 60% of 2008 points.

=== Relegation/promotion playoffs ===
| Team 1 | Agg. | Team 2 | 1st leg | 2nd leg |
|---|---|---|---|---|
| Coquimbo Unido | 1–5 | Universidad de Concepción | 0–2 | 1–3 |
| Deportes Puerto Montt | 4–5 | Unión Española | 1–2 | 3–3 |

Unión Española & Universidad de Concepción remained at the Primera División.
