= 2007 Torneo Apertura (Chile) =

Campeonato Nacional Apertura Copa Banco del Estado
- Season: 2007
- Dates: 26 January – 17 June 2007
- Champions: Colo-Colo; 26th title
- 2008 Copa Libertadores: Colo-Colo
- 2007 Copa Sudamericana: Colo-Colo; Audax Italiano
- Matches: 210
- Goals: 617 (2.94 per match)
- Top goalscorer: Humberto Suazo (18 goals)
- Biggest home win: Cobreloa 7–1 Antofagasta (27 January 2007)
- Biggest away win: Puerto Montt 2–5 Unión Española (25 March 2006)
- Longest winning run: 8 matches Colo-Colo
- Longest unbeaten run: 16 matches Colo-Colo
- Longest winless run: 10 matches Lota Schwager
- Longest losing run: 6 matches Santiago Wanderers
- Highest attendance: 50,000; Colo-Colo 1–0 Palestino
- Total attendance: 1,153,826
- Average attendance: 5,494

The 2007 Campeonato Nacional Apertura Copa Banco del Estado was the 81st Chilean League top flight tournament, in which Colo-Colo won its 26th league title.

== Teams ==
=== Stadia ===
Team	Home city	Stadium	Capacity	2006 season
Antofagasta	Antofagasta	Regional de Antofagasta	25,000	11th in Regular Phase
Audax Italiano	Santiago	Municipal de La Florida	10,000	Clausura runners-up
Cobreloa	Calama	Municipal de Calama	13,000	1st in Regular Phase
Cobresal	El Salvador	Estadio El Cobre	14,000	15th in Regular Phase
Colo-Colo	Santiago	Estadio Monumental	47,017	Clausura winners
Coquimbo Unido	Coquimbo	Francisco Sánchez Rumoroso	10,000	5th in Regular Phase
Deportes Concepción	Concepción	Municipal de Concepción	29,000	Withdraw
Deportes La Serena	La Serena	La Portada	14,000	16th in Regular Phase
Deportes Melipilla	Melipilla	Municipal Roberto Bravo Santibáñez	12,400	Primera B Winners
Everton	Viña del Mar	Sausalito	19,074	12th in Regular Phase
Huachipato	Talcahuano	Estadio Las Higueras	10,500	4th in Regular Phase
Lota Schwager	Coronel	Federico Schwager	12,400	Primera B Liguilla winner
Ñublense	Chillán	Municipal Nelson Oyarzún Arenas	12,400	Primera B runners-up
Palestino	Santiago	La Cisterna	12,000	13th in Regular Phase
Puerto Montt	Santiago	Regional de Chinquihue	8,000	3rd in Regular Phase
O'Higgins	Melipilla	El Teniente	14,500	2nd in Regular Phase
Santiago Wanderers	Valparaíso	Regional Chiledeportes	18,500	7th in Regular Phase
Unión Española	Santiago	Santa Laura	18,500	17th in Regular Phase
Universidad Católica	Santiago	San Carlos de Apoquindo	14,000	4th in Regular Phase
Universidad de Chile	Santiago	Estadio Nacional	66,000	10th in Regular Phase
Universidad de Concepción	Concepción	Municipal de Concepción	29,000	8th in Regular Phase

== League table ==
Pos	Team	Pld	W	D	L	GF	GA	GD	Pts	Qualification
1	Colo-Colo	20	14	5	1	47	16	+31	47	2008 Copa Libertadores & 2007 Pre-Copa Sudamericana
2	Universidad Católica	20	14	4	2	36	14	+22	46	2007 Pre-Copa Sudamericana
3	Audax Italiano	20	13	5	2	39	20	+19	44	2007 Pre-Copa Sudamericana
4	Huachipato	20	12	4	4	35	21	+14	40	2007 Pre-Copa Sudamericana
5	Cobreloa	20	10	5	5	44	23	+21	35	
6	Cobresal	20	9	5	6	31	21	+10	32	
7	Ñublense	20	8	8	4	31	31	0	32	
8	Unión Española	20	8	4	8	29	25	+4	28	
9	Deportes Melipilla	20	8	4	8	35	34	+1	28	
10	O'Higgins	20	8	3	9	30	38	−8	27	
11	Deportes La Serena	20	7	5	8	31	30	+1	26	
12	Everton	20	6	8	6	24	27	−3	26	
13	Universidad de Chile	20	6	7	7	20	21	−1	25	
14	Deportes Concepción	20	6	5	9	20	34	−14	23	
15	Palestino	20	5	8	7	27	30	−3	23	
16	Deportes Antofagasta	20	5	7	8	24	34	−10	22	
17	Universidad de Concepción	20	4	5	11	25	33	−8	17	
18	Deportes Puerto Montt	20	4	2	14	19	40	−21	14	
19	Coquimbo Unido	20	4	2	14	18	40	−22	14	
20	Santiago Wanderers (Note: Santiago Wanderers were docked three points for not paying their players on time in November 2006)	20	4	4	12	24	33	−9	13	
21	Lota Schwager	20	2	6	12	28	52	−24	12	

Source: Asociación Nacional de Fútbol Profesional
Notes:

Rules for classification: 1st points; 2nd wins; 3rd goal difference; 4th goals scored; 5th away goals; 6th red cards; 7th yellow cards; 8th draw.

== Top goalscorers ==
As of 12 June 2011.

Rank	Player	Club	Goals
1	(Chile) Humberto Suazo	Colo-Colo	18
2	(Argentina) José Luis Díaz	Cobreloa	16
3	(Argentina) Lucas Barrios	Cobreloa	14
4
4	(Chile) Luis Núñez	Universidad Católica	11
4	(Chile) César Díaz	Cobresal	11
5	(Argentina) Esteban Fuertes	Universidad Católica	10
5	(Chile) Julio Gutiérrez	Unión Española	10

== Pre-Copa Sudamericana play-off ==
18 July 2007	Universidad Católica	0–3	Audax Italiano	Estadio San Carlos de Apoquindo, Santiago
20:40 (UTC-4)			11' Villanueva; 32' Medina; 63' Orellana	Attendance: 7,000; Referee: E. Osses

19 July 2007	Colo-Colo	2–1	Huachipato	Estadio Sausalito, Viña del Mar
20:10 (UTC-4)	Hernández 11'; Aceval 88'		7' J. González	Attendance: 8,000; Referee: C. Chandía

Audax Italiano & Colo-Colo qualified for the 2007 Copa Sudamericana
