= 2007 Torneo Clausura (Chile) =

Campeonato Nacional Clausura Copa Banco Estado
- Season: 2007
- Dates: 21 July – 23 December 2007
- Champions: Colo-Colo; 27th title
- Relegated: Coquimbo Unido; Lota Schwager; Santiago Wanderers; Deportes Puerto Montt (Rel. Liguilla)
- 2008 Copa Libertadores: Universidad Católica (Agg. Table); Audax Italiano (Clau. Table)
- Matches played: 225
- Goals scored: 656 (2.92 per match)
- Top goalscorer: Carlos Villanueva (20 goals)
- Biggest home win: Audax I. 7–1 S. Wanderers (7 October 2007)
- Highest attendance: 40,000; Colo-Colo 3–0 U. de Concepción (23 December 2007)
- Total attendance: 1,252,404
- Average attendance: 5,566

The 2007 Campeonato Nacional Apertura Copa Banco Estado was the 82nd Chilean League top flight tournament, in which Colo-Colo won its 27th league title.

== First stage ==
=== Group 1 ===
Pos	Team	Pld	W	D	L	GF	GA	GD	Pts	Qualification
1	Colo-Colo	20	11	6	3	40	21	+19	39	Playoffs
2	Cobresal	20	8	8	4	31	23	+8	32	Playoffs
3	Palestino	20	6	6	8	27	23	+4	24	
4	Deportes La Serena	20	6	4	10	25	33	−8	22	
5	Santiago Wanderers	20	4	5	11	15	43	−28	17	

=== Group 2 ===
Pos	Team	Pld	W	D	L	GF	GA	GD	Pts	Qualification
1	Universidad de Concepción	20	9	8	3	30	19	+11	35	Playoffs
2	Universidad Católica	20	10	4	6	33	21	+12	34	Playoffs
3	Deportes Melipilla	20	7	6	7	32	34	−2	27	
4	Deportes Concepción	20	7	4	9	30	41	−11	25	
5	Unión Española	20	4	5	11	26	36	−10	17	

=== Group 3 ===
Pos	Team	Pld	W	D	L	GF	GA	GD	Pts	Qualification
1	Audax Italiano	20	14	5	1	47	20	+27	47	Playoffs and 2008 Copa Libertadores First Stage (Note: Audax Italiano qualified to the 2008 Copa Libertadores as the team with the most points in the Clausura classification phase.)
2	Universidad de Chile	20	13	6	1	42	21	+21	45	Playoffs
3	Cobreloa	20	8	7	5	35	29	+6	31	Play-off Match
4	Deportes Puerto Montt	20	5	6	9	18	22	−4	21	
5	Everton	20	3	4	13	20	36	−16	13	

=== Group 4 ===
Pos	Team	Pld	W	D	L	GF	GA	GD	Pts	Qualification
1	O'Higgins	20	9	7	4	28	23	+5	34	Playoffs
2	Ñublense	20	7	5	8	32	38	−6	26	Play-off Match
3	Deportes Antofagasta	20	6	7	7	22	21	+1	25	
4	Huachipato	20	7	4	9	30	36	−6	25	
5	Lota Schwager	20	4	7	9	22	28	−6	19	
6	Coquimbo Unido	20	4	1	15	18	37	−19	13	

Updated to match(es) played on November 25, 2007. Source: RSSSF
Rules for classification: 1) points; 2) goal difference; 3) number of goals scored.

=== Playoff match ===
A playoff round was contested because there was a third-placed team who had more points than a second placed team. In a playoff round the third-placed team would have the home field advantage.

Team 1	Score	Team 2
Cobreloa	3–1	Ñublense

=== Playoff stage ===
Quarterfinals
5	Universidad Católica	5	0	5
4	Universidad de Concepción (a)	3	2	5
8	Cobreloa	2	0	2
1	Audax Italiano	2	1	3
6	O'Higgins	0	1	1
3	Colo-Colo	5	1	6
7	Cobresal	2	1	3
2	Universidad de Chile	4	2	6

Semifinals
4	Universidad de Concepción	2	3	5
1	Audax Italiano	3	1	4
3	Colo-Colo	2	1	3
2	Universidad de Chile	0	0	0

Final
4	Universidad de Concepción	0	0	0
3	Colo-Colo	1	3	4

=== Top goalscorers ===
Pos	Player	Team	Goals
1	(Chile) Carlos Villanueva	Audax Italiano	20
2	(Chile) Pedro Morales	Universidad de Chile	13
2	(Chile) Manuel Villalobos	Ñublense	13
4	(Chile) Cristián Canío	Cobreloa	12
4	(Chile) Gabriel Vargas	Cobresal	12
6	(Argentina) Esteban Fuertes	Universidad Católica	11

== Relegation ==
=== Relegation table ===
Pos	Team	Pld	W	D	L	GF	GA	GD	Pts	Qualification or relegation
17	Everton	40	9	12	19	44	63	−19	39	
18	Deportes Puerto Montt	40	9	8	23	37	62	−25	35	Plays Relegation/promotion Liguilla
19	Lota Schwager	40	6	13	21	50	80	−30	31	Relegated to Primera B
20	Santiago Wanderers	40	8	9	23	39	76	−37	30 (Note: 3 points deducted due to financial issues)	Relegated to Primera B
21	Coquimbo Unido	40	8	3	29	36	77	−41	27	Relegated to Primera B

=== Relegation/promotion playoffs ===
Pos	Team	Pld	W	D	L	GF	GA	GD	Pts	Promotion or qualification
1	Santiago Morning	4	2	1	1	4	3	+1	7	Promoted to Primera División
2	Deportes Puerto Montt	4	2	0	2	9	9	0	6	To Primera B
3	Deportes Copiapó	4	1	1	2	6	7	−1	4	To Primera B
