= List of 2009 Primera División de Chile transfers =

This is a list of transfers that took place during the 2009 Primera División of Chile season.

== Apertura 2009 ==
=== Audax Italiano ===
In

- (Chile) Christian Vilches from (Chile) Palestino
- Christian Martínez from Universidad de Chile
- (Paraguay) Fabián Benítez from (Chile) Cobreloa
- (Argentina) Matías Quiroga from (Argentina) Talleres
- (Brazil) Ricardinho from (Peru) Universidad San Martín

Out

- (Argentina) Miguel Ángel Romero to (Chile) Coquimbo Unido
- (Chile) Braulio Leal to (Chile) Unión Española
- Juan González to Universidad de Chile (end of loan)
- (Chile) Manuel Ibarra to (Chile) Coquimbo Unido
- (Paraguay) Mario Villasanti Released
- (Uruguay) Marcelo Broli Released

=== Cobreloa ===
In

- (Chile) Alejandro Osorio from (Chile) Ñublense
- (Paraguay) Rodolfo Guillén from (Paraguay) 12 de Octubre
- (Chile) Sebastián Montecinos from (Chile) San Marcos
- (Chile) Michael Silva from (Mexico) Lobos BUAP
- (Argentina) Pablo Mannara from (Argentina) Nueva Chicago
- (Spain) Juan Carlos Caballero from (Spain) Benidorm CD
- (Argentina) Lucas Gauna from (Argentina) Nueva Chicago
- (Argentina) Leonardo Iorlano from (Argentina) Almagro
- (Paraguay) Ever Cantero from (Chile) Ñublense

Out

- (Argentina) Gustavo Savoia to (Brazil) Ponte Preta
- (Chile) Francisco Prieto to (Chile) Colo-Colo
- (Chile) Rafael Celedón to (Chile) Municipal Iquique
- (Chile) Daniel González to (Brazil) Náutico (Returns to Colo-Colo)
- (Paraguay) Fabián Benítez to (Chile) Audax Italiano
- (Uruguay) Iván Guillauma to (Chile) Santiago Morning
- (Chile) Luis Fuentes to (Chile) Coquimbo Unido

=== Cobresal ===
In

- (Chile) Nicolás Canales from (Chile) Unión Española (loan)
- (Chile) Marcelo Medina from (Chile) O'Higgins
- (Chile) Jorge Lagunas from (Chile) Deportes Melipilla
- (Chile) Ányelo Alvarado from (Chile) Deportes Puerto Montt
- (Chile) Hans Gómez from (Chile) O'Higgins
- (Chile) José Miguel Rosales from (Chile) O'Higgins
- (Chile) Carlos Alzamora from (Chile) Deportes La Serena
- (Chile) Juan Cisternas from (Chile) Fernández Vial
- (Chile) Rony Pérez from (Mexico) Cruz Azul Hidalgo

Out

- (Argentina) Diego Guidi to (Chile) Deportes La Serena
- (Chile) Marco Olea to (Mexico) Lobos BUAP
- (Chile) Luis Godoy to (Chile) Unión La Calera
- (Chile) Fredy Segura to (Chile) Deportes La Serena
- (Chile) Fabián Alfaro to (Chile) Deportes Copiapó
- (Chile) Rodrigo Núñez to (Chile) Deportes Antofagasta
- (Chile) Pedro Muñoz to (Chile) Curicó Unido

=== Colo-Colo ===
In

- (Paraguay) Rodrigo Riquelme from (Chile) Curicó Unido
- (Argentina) César Carranza from (Argentina) Gimnasia y Esgrima de Jujuy
- (Paraguay) Nelson Cabrera from (Paraguay) Cerro Porteño
- (Chile) Francisco Prieto from (Chile) Cobreloa
- (Chile) Yerson Opazo from (Chile) Deportes La Serena
- (Chile) Gerardo Cortés from (Chile) Unión Española (loan return)
- (Chile) Daniel González to (Chile) Cobreloa (loan return)
- (Chile) Fernando Meneses to (Chile) O'Higgins (loan return)
- (Chile) Boris Sagredo from (Chile) Palestino (loan return)
- (Chile) Bruno Romo from (Chile) Santiago Wanderers (loan return)
- (Chile) Rafael Caroca from (Chile) O'Higgins (loan return)
- (Chile) Sebastián González from (Mexico) Tecos

Out

- (Chile) Rainer Wirth to (Chile) Municipal Iquique (loaned)
- (Chile) Moisés Villarroel to (Chile) Santiago Wanderers
- (Chile) Jorge Carrasco to (Chile) Palestino (loaned)
- (Chile) Daniel González to (Brazil) Náutico (loaned)
- (Chile) Cristobal Jorquera to (Chile) O'Higgins (loaned)
- (Chile) Juan Gonzalo Lorca to (Chile) O'Higgins (loaned)
- (Chile) Fernando Meneses to (Chile) O'Higgins (loaned)
- (Chile) Bastián Arce to (Chile) Rangers (loaned)
- (Chile) Ricardo Rojas to (Mexico) Necaxa

=== Curicó Unido ===
In

- (Paraguay) Ever Amarilla from (Chile) Unión Española
- (Chile) Héctor Barra from (Chile) Deportes Melipilla
- (Chile) Johan Fuentes from (Chile) Unión Española
- (Chile) Sebastián Páez from (Chile) Provincial Osorno
- (Chile) Pedro Muñoz from (Chile) Cobresal (loan return)
- (Argentina) Mateo Martinelli from (Argentina) Ben Hur
- (Chile) Claudio Calderón from (Chile) Unión Española
- (Chile) César Díaz from (Chile) Deportes Melipilla
- (Uruguay) Alberto Ortega from (Bolivia) Aurora
- (Chile) Rodrigo Brito from (Chile) Deportes La Serena
- (Uruguay) Sebastián Morquio from (Uruguay) Progreso

Out

- (Paraguay) Rodrigo Riquelme to (Chile) Colo-Colo
- (Chile) Luis Jara to (Chile) Deportes La Serena
- (Chile) Víctor González to (Chile) San Marcos
- (Chile) José Mardones to (Chile) Lota Schwager
- (Chile) Jonathan Núñez to (Chile) Rangers
- (Paraguay) Bibencio Servín to (Paraguay) Fernando de la Mora

=== Deportes La Serena ===
In:

- (Chile) Luis Jara from (Chile) Curicó Unido
- (Argentina) Sebastián Tagliabué from (Chile) Everton
- (Chile) Jorge Schwager from (Chile) Deportes Puerto Montt
- (Chile) Patricio Rubina from (Chile) Universidad de Concepción
- (Chile) Fredy Segura from (Chile) Cobresal
- (Chile) Juan Luis González from (Chile) Everton
- (Argentina) Diego Guidi from (Chile) Cobresal

Out:

- (Chile) Yerson Opazo to (Chile) Colo-Colo
- (Chile) Fabián Acuña to (Chile) Coquimbo Unido
- (Argentina) Gustavo Canales to (Chile) Unión Española
- (Argentina) Martín Gianfelice to (Argentina) Estudiantes de Caseros
- (Chile) Juan Quiroga to (Chile) Coquimbo Unido
- (Chile) Carlos Alzamora to (Chile) Cobresal
- (Chile) Ángel Carreño to (Chile) Ñublense
- (Chile) Luis Peña to (Chile) Lota Schwager
- (Chile) Jonathan Domínguez to (Chile) Unión San Felipe
- (Chile) Pedro Carrizo to (Chile) Deportes Antofagasta
- (Chile) Rodrigo Brito to (Chile) Curicó Unido

=== Everton ===
In

- (Chile) Fernando Manriquez from (Chile) Santiago Morning
- (Chile) Roberto Gutiérrez from (Mexico) Tecos
- (Chile) Rodrigo Ramírez from (Chile) O'Higgins
- (Paraguay) Diego Figueredo from (Paraguay) Cerro Porteño
- (Uruguay) Nicolás Freitas from (Uruguay) Progreso
- (Argentina) Sebastián Penco from (Greece) Skoda Xanthi
- (Chile) Nicolás Peric from (Turkey) Gençlerbirliği
- (Argentina) Oscar Cornejo from (Chile) Cobreloa
- (Chile) José Luis Muñoz from (Chile) Magallanes

Out

- Mauricio Arias to Universidad de Chile
- (Chile) Paulo Garcés to (Chile) Universidad Católica
- (Chile) Cristián Canío to (Argentina) San Martín de Tucumán
- (Argentina) Sebastián Tagliabué to (Chile) Deportes La Serena
- (Chile) Juan Luis González to (Chile) Deportes La Serena
- Ángel Rojas to Universidad de Chile
- (Uruguay) Jesús Toscanini to (Uruguay) Tacuarembó
- (Colombia) John Jairo Castillo to (Colombia) Deportivo Pereira
- (Chile) José Luis Cabión to (Chile) Santiago Morning

=== Huachipato ===
In

- (Chile) Luis Ignacio Quinteros from (Mexico) León
- (Chile) Edgardo Abdala from (Chile) Ñublense
- (Chile) Carlos Espinoza from (Chile) Deportes Puerto Montt
- (Argentina) José Luis Zelaye from (Chile) Palestino
- (Chile) Adrián Vilchez from (Chile) Unión Española

Out

- (Chile) Mauricio Zenteno to (Chile) Universidad Católica (loan return)
- (Paraguay) Henry Lapczyk to (Paraguay) Sportivo Luqueño
- (Chile) Miguel Aceval to (Chile) Unión Española
- (Chile) Roberto Cartes to (Mexico) Tampico Madero
- (Paraguay) José Carlos Burgos to (Chile) Deportes Concepción
- (Chile) Hernán Madrid to (Chile) Unión La Calera

=== Municipal Iquique ===
In

Out

=== Ñublense ===
In

Out

=== O'Higgins ===
In

- (Colombia) Jorge Rivera from (Peru) Alianza Atlético
- (Chile) Albert Acevedo from (Chile) Universidad Católica
- (Argentina) Santiago Gentiletti from (Argentina) Gimnasia y Esgrima de La Plata
- (Chile) Fernando Meneses from (Chile) Colo-Colo
- (Paraguay) Ever Cantero from (Chile) Ñublense
- (Chile) Cristobal Jorquera from (Chile) Colo-Colo
- (Chile) Samuel Teuber from (Chile) Provincial Osorno
- (Argentina) Nicolás Medina from (Argentina) Gimnasia y Esgrima de La Plata
- (Chile) Juan Gonzalo Lorca from (Chile) Colo-Colo
- (Argentina) César Taborda from (Argentina) Estudiantes

Out

- (Chile) Jean Beausejour to (Mexico) América
- (Chile) Carlos Tejas to (Chile) Coquimbo Unido
- (Argentina) Nicolás Diez to (Argentina) Unión de Santa Fe
- (Paraguay) Néstor Bareiro to (Mexico) San Luis de Potosí
- (Chile) Rodrigo Ramírez to (Chile) Everton
- (Brazil) Aílton to (Mexico) Veracruz
- (Chile) Marcelo Medina to (Chile) Cobresal
- (Chile) Rafael Caroca to (Chile) Colo-Colo
- (Chile) Sebastián Varas to (Chile) San Luis
- (Chile) José Miguel Rosales to (Chile) Cobresal
- (Chile) Hans Gómez to (Chile) Cobresal
- (Argentina) Federico Martorell to (Greece) Thraysvoulos
- (Argentina) Javier García to (Argentina) Tiro Federal

=== Palestino ===
In

- (Argentina) Juan Manuel Quevedo from (Argentina) Temperley
- (Argentina) Marcos Lovos from (Argentina) Temperley
- (Chile) Jorge Carrasco from (Chile) Colo-Colo
- (Chile) Andrés Oroz from (Chile) Rangers
- (Chile) Héctor Tapia (Free agent)
- (Chile) Carlos Cancino from (Chile) Unión La Calera
- (Chile) César Henríquez from (Greece) Panthrakikos
- (Uruguay) Román Cuello from (Azerbaijan) Inter Baku
- (Chile) Álvaro Sarabia from (Chile) Rangers
- (Chile) Ignacio Parra from (Romania) Unirea Focşani
- (Argentina) Bruno Bianchi from (Peru) Universidad San Martín

Out

- (Chile) Christian Vilches to (Chile) Audax Italiano
- (Argentina) José Luis Zelaye to (Chile) Huachipato
- (Chile) Nelson Saavedra to (Brazil) Vitória
- (Chile) Octavio Pozo to (Chile) Naval
- (Chile) Rodolfo Madrid to (Chile) Unión Española
- (Argentina) Héctor Pericás to (Chile) Unión La Calera
- (Chile) Boris Sagredo to (Chile) Colo-Colo (end of loan)
- (Paraguay) Víctor Aquino to (Portugal) Marítimo

=== Rangers ===
In

- (Chile) Diego de Gregorio from (Romania) Pandurii
- (Chile) Eric Pino from (Chile) Deportes Antofagasta
- (Chile) Jonathan Núñez from (Chile) Curicó Unido
- (Chile) Juan Luis Mora from (Chile) Fernández Vial
- (Chile) Carlos Espinoza from (Chile) Deportes Melipilla
- (Chile) Anibal Carvallo from (Chile) Colo-Colo (on loan)
- (Chile) Marcos Millape from (Chile) Provincial Osorno
- (Uruguay) Maximiliano Pérez from (Uruguay) Defensor Sporting
- (Chile) Bastián Arce from (Chile) Colo-Colo
- (Argentina) Pablo Vranjicán from (Argentina) Newell's Old Boys

Out

- (Chile) Rodrigo Barra to (Chile) Santiago Wanderers
- (Chile) Andrés Oroz to (Chile) Palestino
- (Uruguay) Martin Ferrando to (Uruguay) Cerro
- (Chile) Marcelo Lucero to (Chile) Provincial Osorno
- (Argentina) Gastón Cellerino to (Italy) Livorno
- (Argentina) Enzo Gutiérrez to (Portugal) Marítimo
- (Chile) Esteban González to (Chile) Ñublense
- (Argentina) Juan Manuel Cavallo to (Ecuador) Técnico Universitario
- (Chile) Rodrigo Pereira to (Chile) Naval

=== Santiago Morning ===
In

- (Chile) Marco Rodríguez from (Chile) Provincial Osorno
- (Chile) Mario Berríos from (Malaysia) Perak FA
- (Uruguay) Iván Guillauma from (Chile) Cobreloa
- (Chile) José Luis Cabión from (Chile) Everton
- (Chile) Michael Ríos from (Chile) San Marcos
- (Chile) Marco Moscoso from (Chile) San Marcos
- (Paraguay) Fidencio Oviedo from (Paraguay) Sol de América
- (Chile) Pedro Rivera from (Chile) Ñublense

Out

- (Chile) Néstor Contreras from (Chile) Deportes Melipilla
- (Chile) Miguel Catalán Released
- (Chile) Héctor Santibáñez Retired
- (Chile) Cristian Febre from (Chile) Coquimbo Unido
- (Chile) Francisco Huaiquipán to (Chile) Deportes Antofagasta
- (Chile) Fernando Manríquez to (Chile) Everton
- (Chile) Eduardo Dumas to (Chile) Naval

=== Unión Española ===
In

- (Chile) Braulio Leal from (Chile) Audax Italiano
- (Argentina) Gustavo Canales from (Chile) Deportes La Serena
- (Chile) Nicolás Núñez from (Chile) Universidad Católica
- (Chile) Miguel Aceval from (Chile) Huachipato
- (Chile) Rodolfo Madrid from (Chile) Palestino
- (Argentina) Raúl Estévez from Universidad de Chile
- (Argentina) David Ramírez from (Argentina) Gimnasia y Esgrima de La Plata

Out

- (Chile) Jose Luis Sierra Retired
- (Argentina) Ángel Vildozo to (Chile) Unión Española
- (Chile) Gerardo Cortés to (Chile) Colo-Colo (end of loan)
- (Chile) Johan Fuentes to (Chile) Curicó Unido
- (Chile) Nicolás Canales to (Chile) Cobresal
- (Paraguay) Nelson López to (Bolivia) La Paz FC

=== Universidad Católica ===
In

Out

=== Universidad de Concepción ===
In

Out

=== Universidad de Chile ===
In

Out

== Clausura 2009 ==
=== Audax Italiano ===
In

- (Chile) Cristián Canío from (Argentina) San Martín de Tucumán
- (Argentina) Mauro Olivi from (Argentina) Olimpo
- (Chile) Sebastián Pinto from (Argentina) Gimnasia y Esgrima de Jujuy
- (Brazil) Roberval from (Argentina) San Martín de San Juan

Out

- (Chile) Fabián Orellana to (Italy) Udinese
- (Argentina) Rubén Gigena to (Ecuador) LDU Portoviejo
- (Chile) Patricio Gutiérrez to (Chile) Curicó Unido
- (Chile) Mauricio Salazar to (Chile) Deportes La Serena
- (Argentina) Omar Mallea to (Argentina) Deportivo Maipú
- (Uruguay) Lucas Suárez (released)
- (Brazil) Ricardinho Released

=== Cobreloa ===
In

- (Bolivia) Carlos Tordoya from (Bolivia) Bolívar
- (Paraguay) Tomás González from (Paraguay) 2 de Mayo
- (Argentina) Mathias Caserio from (Argentina) Central Córdoba
- (Argentina) Simón Ramírez Transferred from (Argentina) All Boys
- (Argentina) Emanuel Lazzarini from (Argentina) Newell's Old Boys

Out

- (Chile) Charles Aránguiz to (Chile) Colo-Colo
- (Chile) Paulo Magalhães to (Chile) Colo-Colo
- (Argentina) Rodrigo Mannara to (Chile) Universidad Católica
- (Spain) Juan Carlos Caballero to (Spain) Alicante CF
- (Chile) Alonzo Zúñiga to (Chile) Santiago Morning
- (Chile) Jonathan Retamal to (Chile) Naval
- (Argentina) Lucas Gauna Released
- (Argentina) Leonardo Iorlano Released

=== Cobresal ===
In

- (Uruguay) Iván Guillauma from (Chile) Santiago Morning
- (Paraguay) Juan Cabral from (Chile) Universidad de Concepción
- (Uruguay) Sebastián Suárez from (Uruguay) Cerro
- (Paraguay) Michael Godoy from (Paraguay) Olimpia
- (Chile) Claudio Calderón from (Chile) Curicó Unido

Out

- (Chile) Carlos Alzamora Released
- (Chile) Rony Pérez Released
- (Argentina) Cristian Ríos to (Chile) Municipal Iquique

=== Colo-Colo ===
In

- (Chile) Charles Aránguiz from (Chile) Cobreloa
- (Chile) Paulo Magalhães from (Chile) Cobreloa
- (Chile) Esteban Paredes from (Chile) Santiago Morning
- (Argentina) Ezequiel Miralles from (Chile) Everton
- (Paraguay) Cristian Bogado from (Argentina) Estudiantes (loaned)
- (Chile) Diego Olate from (Chile) O'Higgins
- (Venezuela) José Manuel Rey from (Venezuela) Caracas (loaned)
- (Chile) Alex von Schwedler from (Portugal) Belenenses

Out

- (Chile) Sebastián González to (Cyprus) AEP Paphos
- (Chile) Yerson Opazo to (Chile) O'Higgins
- (Chile) Luis Pedro Figueroa to (Brazil) Palmeiras
- (Argentina) César Carranza to (Chile) Everton (on loan)
- (Chile) Rodolfo Moya to (Chile) Everton (on loan)
- (Chile) Boris Sagredo to (Chile) Municipal Iquique (on loan)
- (Paraguay) Nelson Cabrera to (Romania) CFR Cluj (on loan)
- (Chile) Felipe Hernández to (Chile) Deportes Puerto Montt (on loan)
- (Paraguay) Rodrigo Riquelme to (Chile) Palestino
- (Argentina) Lucas Barrios to (Germany) Borussia Dortmund
- (Chile) Gonzalo Jara to (England) West Bromwich Albion
- (Chile) Daniel González to (Chile) O'Higgins (on loan)

Manager in

- (Argentina) Hugo Tocalli Free agent

Manager out

- (Argentina) Marcelo Barticciotto Released

=== Curicó Unido ===
In

- (Chile) Ricardo Parada from (Chile) Deportes Antofagasta
- (Chile) Jairo Neira from (Chile) Universidad de Concepción
- (Argentina) Sergio Valenti from (Argentina) Gimnasia y Esgrima de La Plata
- (Chile) Patricio Gutiérrez from (Chile) Audax Italiano
- (Paraguay) Braulio Armoa from (China) Sichuan FC
- (Chile) Eric Olivares from (Chile) Deportes Melipilla
- (Uruguay) Liber Quiñones from (Uruguay) Racing de Montevideo

Out

- (Chile) Pedro Muñoz to (Chile) Universidad de Concepción
- (Paraguay) Ever Amarilla to (Chile) Deportes Puerto Montt
- (Chile) Daniel Briceño to (Chile) Unión San Felipe
- (Chile) Claudio Calderón to (Chile) Cobresal
- (Chile) Felipe Miranda Released

=== Deportes La Serena ===
In:

- (Chile) Ángel Carreño from (Chile) Ñublense
- (Chile) Mauricio Salazar from (Chile) Audax Italiano
- (Chile) Juan Silva from (Chile) Santiago Wanderers
- (Paraguay) Ronald Villalba from (Ecuador) Deportivo Azogues
- (Paraguay) Óscar Díaz from (Paraguay) 12 de Octubre
- (Argentina) Claudio Pérez from (Argentina) Tiro Federal
- (Argentina) Javier Elizondo from (Argentina) Deportivo Santamarina

Out

- (Chile) Luis Jara Released
- (Chile) Fredy Segura Retired
- (Argentina) Leonardo Abálsamo to (Argentina) Platense

=== Everton ===
In

- (Argentina) César Carranza from (Chile) Colo-Colo (loaned)
- (Chile) Rodolfo Moya from (Chile) Colo-Colo (loaned)
- (Uruguay) Maximiliano Pérez from (Uruguay) Fénix
- (Chile) Sebastián Roco from (Argentina) Gimnasia y Esgrima de Jujuy
- (Uruguay) Mauro Guevgeozián from (Uruguay) Fénix
- (Chile) Cristián Torralbo from (Chile) Lota Schwager

Out

- (Chile) Mathias Vidangossy to (Chile) Ñublense
- (Argentina) Ezequiel Miralles to (Chile) Colo-Colo
- (Chile) Roberto Gutiérrez to (Chile) Universidad Católica
- (Paraguay) Diego Figueredo to (Paraguay) Cerro Porteño
- (Chile) Nicolás Peric to (Argentina) Argentinos Juniors
- (Argentina) Oscar Cornejo to (Argentina) Nueva Chicago
- (Argentina) Sebastián Penco to (Argentina) San Martín de San Juan

=== Huachipato ===
In Out

- (Chile) Fernando Lazcano to (Chile) Deportes Concepción (loaned)

=== Municipal Iquique ===
In

- (Paraguay) Néstor Bareiro from (Mexico) Real San Luis (loaned)
- (Chile) Aníbal Carvallo from (Chile) Rangers
- (Chile) Boris Sagredo from (Chile) Colo-Colo (loaned)
- (Argentina) Cristian Ríos from (Chile) Cobresal
- (Chile) Isaías Peralta from (Chile) Unión Española

Out

- Edson Puch to Universidad de Chile
- (Paraguay) Cristian Bogado to (Argentina) Estudiantes (end of loan)
- (Chile) Rafael Celedón to (Chile) San Marcos (loaned)
- (Paraguay) Vicente Paciello to (Paraguay) 12 de Octubre
- (Paraguay) Arturo Villasanti to (Argentina) Boca Unidos

=== Ñublense ===
In

- (Paraguay) José Pedrozo to (Chile) Deportes Antofagasta
- (Chile) Joel Soto from (Chile) Santiago Wanderers
- (Chile) Jorge Acuña from (South Africa) Mamelodi Sundowns
- (Argentina) Andrés Manzanares Transferred from (Argentina) Quilmes
- (Argentina) Martín Cortés Transferred from (Argentina) Defensores de Belgrano
- (Chile) Mauricio Cataldo Free agent

Out

- (Chile) Jorge Toledo to (Chile) Deportes Concepción
- (Chile) Ángel Carreño to (Chile) Deportes La Serena
- (Chile) Frederic Figueroa to (Chile) Deportes Valdivia
- (Argentina) Matías Rojas to (Chile) Lota Schwager
- (Chile) Roberto Órdenes Transferred to (Chile) Unión Española
- (Paraguay) Rodrigo Cantero Released
- (Chile) Mathías Vidangossy Released

=== O'Higgins ===
In

- (Chile) Yerson Opazo from (Chile) Colo-Colo
- (Chile) Leonardo Saavedra from (Chile) Deportes Antofagasta
- (Chile) Iván Vásquez from (Chile) Universidad Católica
- (Chile) Kevin Harbottle from (Argentina) Argentinos Juniors
- (Chile) Jaime Grondona from (Chile) Santiago Morning
- (Argentina) Aníbal Domeneghini from (Chile) Unión Española (on loan)
- (Chile) Cristián Suárez from (Argentina) Chacarita Juniors
- (Chile) Alejandro Vásquez from (Chile) Universidad de Concepción
- (Chile) Daniel González from (Brazil) Náutico (on loan from Colo-Colo)

Out

- (Argentina) César Taborda to (Argentina) Estudiantes (end of loan)
- (Chile) Bryan Danesi to (Chile) San Luis
- (Chile) Diego Olate to (Chile) Colo-Colo

=== Palestino ===
In

- (Chile) Marco Olea from (Mexico) Lobos BUAP
- (Chile) Luis Oyarzún (Free agent)
- (Argentina) Facundo Pereyra from (Argentina) Estudiantes de Caseros
- (Paraguay) Rodrigo Riquelme from (Chile) Colo-Colo
- (Chile) Juan Sáez from (Chile) Deportes Melipilla
- (Chile) Luis Núñez from (Chile) Universidad Católica
- (Paraguay) Héctor Pérez from (Chile) Unión Española

Out

- (Chile) Nelson Saavedra to (Brazil) São Paulo
- (Argentina) Bruno Bianchi to (Spain) SD Lemona
- (Uruguay) Román Cuello Released
- (Argentina) Marcos Lovos Released

=== Rangers ===
In

- (Argentina) Ezequiel Brítez from (Mexico) Irapuato
- (Paraguay) Roberto Bonet from (Argentina) Quilmes
- (Argentina) Enzo Gutiérrez from (Portugal) Marítimo
- (Argentina) Lucas Ojeda from (Argentina) Gimnasia y Esgrima (CdU)
- (Chile) Iván Álvarez from (Chile) Deportes Puerto Montt
- (Argentina) Eduardo Dos Santos from (Argentina) Almagro
- (Chile) David Villarroel from (Chile) Fernández Vial

Out

- (Chile) Aníbal Carvallo to (Chile) Municipal Iquique
- (Uruguay) Maximiliano Pérez to (Chile) Everton
- (Paraguay) Jorge Aquino to (Chile) Naval
- (Chile) Diego de Gregorio to (Chile) San Marcos
- (Chile) Eduardo Picart Died

=== Santiago Morning ===
In

- (Colombia) Fabián Cuéllar from (Colombia) Atlético Huila
- (Argentina) Sérgio Comba from (Argentina) Defensores de Belgrano
- (Uruguay) Martín Ferrando from (Uruguay) Cerro
- (Chile) Reinaldo Navia from (Ecuador) LDU Quito
- (Chile) Alonzo Zúñiga from (Chile) Cobreloa
- (Chile) Rodolfo Beltrán from (Chile) Deportes Ovalle
- (Chile) Emanuel González from (Chile) Deportes Ovalle
- (Chile) Bernardo Campos from (Chile) Universidad Católica

Out

- (Uruguay) Iván Guillauma to (Chile) Cobresal
- (Chile) Esteban Paredes to (Chile) Colo-Colo
- (Chile) Jaime Grondona to (Chile) O'Higgins

=== Unión Española ===
In

- (Chile) Eduardo Rubio from (Switzerland) FC Basel
- (Uruguay) Matías Masiero from (Uruguay) Bella Vista
- (Chile) Roberto Órdenes from (Chile) Ñublense
- (Colombia) Francisco Nájera from (Colombia) Santa Fe

Out

- (Chile) Miguel Orellana to (Chile) Provincial Osorno
- (Chile) Isaías Peralta to (Chile) Municipal Iquique
- (Argentina) Aníbal Domeneghini to (Chile) O'Higgins
- (Chile) Clarence Acuña to (Chile) O'Higgins
- (Paraguay) Héctor Pérez to (Chile) Palestino (loaned)

=== Universidad Católica ===
In

- (Argentina) Rodrigo Mannara from (Chile) Cobreloa
- (Chile) Leonel Mena from (Chile) Universidad de Concepción
- (Chile) David Henríquez from (Mexico) Dorados de Sinaloa (on loan)
- (Chile) Roberto Gutiérrez from (Mexico) Tecos (on loan)
- (Argentina) Damián Díaz from (Argentina) Boca Juniors (on loan)
- (Argentina) Juan José Morales from (Argentina) Quilmes

Out

- (Chile) Luis Núñez to (Chile) Palestino
- (Chile) Iván Vásquez to (Chile) O'Higgins
- (Paraguay) Jaison Ibarrola to (Paraguay) Cerro Porteño
- (Argentina) Jeremías Caggiano to (Argentina) Gimnasia y Esgrima de Jujuy
- (Paraguay) Gilberto Palacios to (Paraguay) Guaraní
- (Argentina) Damián Luna to (Brazil) São Caetano

=== Universidad de Concepción ===
In

- (Chile) Pedro Muñoz (Chile) Curicó Unido
- (Paraguay) Otelo Ocampos from (Chile) Deportes Puerto Montt
- (Chile) Michael Lepe from (Chile) Naval
- (Canada) Carlos Rivas from (Chile) Municipal Iquique
- (Chile) Alejandro Gaete Transferred from (Chile) Unión La Calera
- (Argentina) Franco Valori Transferred from (Argentina) Rosario Central

Out

- (Chile) Jairo Neira to (Chile) Curicó Unido
- (Chile) Leonel Mena to (Chile) Universidad Católica
- (Paraguay) Juan Cabral to (Chile) Cobresal
- (Chile) José Luis Jiménez to (Chile) Santiago Wanderers
- (Uruguay) Daniel Pereira to (Argentina) Chacarita Juniors

=== Universidad de Chile ===
In

- (Chile) Edson Puch from (Chile) Municipal Iquique
- (Chile) Nelson Pinto from (Mexico) Tecos
- (Uruguay) Mauricio Victorino from (Uruguay) Nacional

Out

- (Chile) Sebastián Pardo Retired
- (Argentina) Cristián Milla to (Argentina) Chacarita Juniors
- (Argentina) Hugo Notario to (Paraguay) Guaraní
- (Chile) Emilio Hernández to (Mexico) Cruz Azul
- (Paraguay) Nelson Cuevas to (Paraguay) Olimpia
- (Chile) Emanuel Vargas to (Chile) Lota Schwager (loaned)
