= Leonardo Figueroa =

Chilean footballer (born 1990)

Personal information
- Full name: Leonardo Figueroa
- Date of birth: 17 April 1990 (age 36)
- Place of birth: Talca, Chile
- Height: 1.85 m (6 ft 1 in)
- Position: Goalkeeper

Team information
- Current team: Deportes Colchagua

Youth career
- Universidad de Concepción

Senior career*
| Years | Team | Apps | (Gls) |
| 2009–2010 | Universidad de Concepción | 0 | (0) |
| 2011 | Fernández Vial | 0 | (0) |
| 2012 | Iberia | 17 | (0) |
| 2013–2019 | Universidad de Concepción | 3 | (0) |
| 2016–2017 | → O'Higgins (loan) | 0 | (0) |
| 2017 | → Cobresal (loan) | 9 | (0) |
| 2018 | → Everton (loan) | 5 | (0) |
| 2019 | → San Luis (loan) | 18 | (0) |
| 2020– | Deportes Colchagua | 0 | (0) |
- * Club domestic league appearances and goals as of 22 March 2020

Leonardo Figueroa (born 17 April 1990) is a Chilean footballer who currently plays for Deportes Colchagua as a goalkeeper.

== Career ==
=== Youth career ===
Figueroa started his career at Primera División de Chile club Universidad de Concepción. He progressed from the under categories club all the way to the senior team.

=== O'Higgins ===
On 10 June 2016, Figueroa firm for 1 year on loan from Universidad de Concepción with O'Higgins.

== Honours ==
=== Club ===
Universidad de Concepción

- Copa Chile: 2014–15
