= Caserio =

Caserio or caserío may refer to:

- Hamlet (place), in Spanish-speaking countries
- Caserío vasco or Baserri, a typical Basque farm building
- Marjorie Constance Caserio (1929-2021), American chemist
- Mathias Caserio (born 1983), Argentine football player
- Nick Caserio (born 1975), American football executive
- Sante Geronimo Caserio (1873–1894), Italian anarchist and assassin of Marie François Sadi Carnot
