= Armoa =

Armoa is a surname. Notable people with the surname include:

- Blas Armoa (born 2000), Paraguayan footballer
- Braulio Armoa (born 1978), Paraguayan footballer
- Manuel Armoa (born 2002), Argentine volleyball player
