= Jonathan Núñez =

Jonathan Núñez may also refer to:

- Jonathan Núñez (Chilean footballer) (born 1986), a Chilean footballer
- Jonathan Núñez (Honduran footballer) (born 2001), a Honduran footballer
