= Francisco Portillo =

Francisco Portillo may refer to:

- Francisco Portillo (footballer, born 1981), Panamanian goalkeeper
- Francisco Portillo (footballer, born 1984), Paraguayan midfielder
- Francisco Portillo (footballer, born 1990), Spanish midfielder

== See also ==
- Portillo (surname)
