= Neira =

Neira may refer to:

== People ==
- Álvaro de Mendaña de Neira (1542–1595), Spanish navigator
- César Neira Pérez (born 1979), Spanish cyclist
- Hernán Neira (born 1960), Chilean writer and professor
- Jairo Neira (born 1987), Chilean footballer
- José Neira (born 1939), Colombian track and field athlete
- Juan Neira (born 1989), Argentine footballer
- Kylie Neira (born 2007), American pole vaulter
- Manuel Neira (born 1977), Chilean footballer
- Miguel Ángel Neira (born 1952), Chilean footballer
- Quique Neira (born 1973), Chilean singer
- Neira Riegger (1891–1936), American singer

== Places ==
- Banda Neira, a settlement in the Banda Islands of Indonesia
- Neira, Caldas, a town and municipality in Colombia
- Neira Province, a province of the Boyacá Department in Colombia

== Organizations ==
- New England Interscholastic Rowing Association, runs a championship regatta for New England school rowing

== Other uses ==
- Hyundai Neira, a battery electric compact MPV
