= Alzamora =

Alzamora is a Spanish surname. Notable people with the surname include:

- Alfons Alzamora (born 1979), Spanish basketball player
- Antonio Fas Alzamora (born 1948), Puerto Rican politician
- Augusto Vargas Alzamora (1922–2000), Peruvian Cardinal Priest and Archbishop of Lima
- Carlos Alzamora, Chilean footballer
- Emilio Alzamora (born 1973), Spanish motorcycle racer
- Hernán Alzamora, Peruvian hurdler
- Isaac Alzamora, Vice President of Peru and foreign minister
- Lizardo Alzamora Porras (1928–2021), Peruvian politician
- Miguel Alzamora, Spanish cyclist
- Sebastià Alzamora i Martín, Spanish writer, literary critic and cultural manager

== See also ==
- Javier Alzamora Valdez Building, Lima, Peru
