= Aníbal Carvallo =

Chilean footballer (born 1990)

Personal information
- Full name: Joseph Aníbal Carvallo Torres
- Date of birth: May 10, 1989 (age 37)
- Place of birth: Lota, Chile
- Height: 1.68 m (5 ft 6 in)
- Position: Forward

Youth career
- Deportes Linares
- Colo-Colo

Senior career*
Years	Team	Apps	(Gls)
2006	Colo-Colo	0	(0)
2007	Deportes Temuco	0	(0)
2008	Deportes Puerto Montt	7	(0)
2009	Rangers	11	(0)
2009	Deportes Iquique	7	(0)
2010	Deportes Puerto Montt	33	(7)
2011–2016	Universidad de Concepción	82	(5)
2016–2017	Deportes Melipilla	29	(5)
2017–2019	Deportes La Serena	32	(4)
2019–2021	Ñublense	29	(0)

International career
2008	Chile U18		
2012	Chile	1	(0)
- * Club domestic league appearances and goals as of 28 December 2020

Joseph Aníbal Carvallo Torres (born 1 May 1990), known as Aníbal Carvallo, is a Chilean footballer who last played for Ñublense in the Primera B de Chile.

== International career ==
Along with Chile U18 he won the 2008 João Havelange Tournament, scoring in the last game. At senior level, he made an appearance for Chile in a friendly match against Paraguay on February 15, 2012.

== Honours ==
=== Club ===
Universidad de Concepción

- Primera B (1): 2013 Transición
- Copa Chile (1): 2014–15

Ñublense

- Primera B (1): 2020

=== International ===
Chile U18

- João Havelange Tournament (1): 2008
