= Rodrigo Riquelme =

Rodrigo Riquelme may refer to:

- Rodrigo Riquelme (footballer, born 1984), Paraguayan-born Chilean footballer
- Rodrigo Riquelme (footballer, born 2000), Spanish footballer
