= Juan Cabral =

Juan Cabral may refer to:

- Juan Cabral (director) (born 1978), Argentine film director
- Juan Cabral (footballer) (born 1984), Paraguayan footballer
- Juan Bautista Cabral (1789–1813), Argentine soldier
