= Diego Churín =

Argentine footballer (born 1989)

Personal information
- Full name: Diego Churín Puyo
- Date of birth: 1 December 1989 (age 36)
- Place of birth: Arroyo Dulce, Argentina
- Height: 1.87 m (6 ft 2 in)
- Position: Striker

Team information
- Current team: Sarmiento
- Number: 9

Youth career
- Juventud de Pergamino

Senior career*
Years	Team	Apps	(Gls)
2006–2007	Juventud de Pergamino	1	(0)
2007–2012	Independiente	8	(0)
2010	→ Platense (loan)	11	(0)
2010	→ Los Andes (loan)	14	(2)
2011	→ Comunicaciones (loan)	19	(1)
2013–2014	Curicó Unido	49	(16)
2014–2017	Universidad Concepción	44	(4)
2016–2017	→ Unión Española (loan)	43	(25)
2017	→ Cerro Porteño (loan)	16	(11)
2018–2020	Cerro Porteño	94	(37)
2020–2022	Grêmio	23	(3)
2022	→ Atlético Goianiense (loan)	36	(8)
2023–2025	Cerro Porteño	66	(14)
2025–2026	Universitario de Deportes	22	(5)
2026–	Club Atlético Sarmiento	22	(2)
- * Club domestic league appearances and goals as of 18:05, 10 November 2026 (UTC)

Diego Churín Puyo (Spanish pronunciation: [ˈdjeɣo tʃuˈɾin], born 1 December 1989) is an Argentine professional footballer who plays as striker for club Sarmiento.

== Career ==
Churín came from the youth ranks of Juventud de Pergamino, later moving to Independiente de Avellaneda, where he was promoted to the senior team under manager Pedro Troglio.

== Honours ==
=== Club ===
Universidad de Concepción

- Copa Chile (1): 2014-15

Cerro Porteño

- Paraguayan Primera División (2): C-2017, A-2020

Grêmio

- Campeonato Gaúcho: 2021, 2022
- Recopa Gaúcha: 2021

Universitario de Deportes

- Peruvian Primera División: 2025

=== Individual ===
Curicó Unido

- Top Goalscorer of Primera B de Chile: Transición 2013

Cerro Porteño

- Top Goalscorer of Paraguayan Primera División: 2017
