= 2014–15 Copa Chile =

Copa Chile MTS

Tournament details
- Country: Chile
- Teams: 32

Final positions
- Champions: Universidad de Concepción
- Runners-up: Palestino

Tournament statistics
- Top goal scorer: Carlos González (8 goals)

The 2014–15 Copa Chile, (officially known as Copa Chile MTS 2014/15 because of its sponsorship), was the 35th edition of the Copa Chile, the country's national cup tournament. The competition started on May 16, 2014 with the First Round and concludes on 2015 with the Final. The winner qualifies for the 2015 Copa Sudamericana and the 2015 Supercopa de Chile.

== Schedule ==
Round	Date
First Round	May 16, 2014; September 23, 2014
Second Round	October 7, 2014; October 29, 2014
Quarterfinals	November 12, 2014; December 4, 2014
Semifinals	January 14, 2015; January 21, 2015
Final	March 28, 2015

== Teams ==
A total 32 clubs were accepted for the competition. For this edition the teams are from the Primera División and Primera B, only.

== First round ==
On this round every team plays home and away against every other team in its group. The best 2 teams from each group advance to the next round.

=== Group 1 ===
Team	Pld	W	D	L	GF	GA	GD	Pts
Magallanes	6	4	1	1	14	6	+8	13
Audax Italiano	6	4	1	1	11	7	+4	13
Universidad de Chile	6	2	2	2	11	7	+4	8
Santiago Morning	6	0	0	6	5	21	-16	0

	UCHI	AUDI	MAGA	SMOR
U. de Chile		0–1	1–3	3–0
Audax I.	1–1		1–2	3–1
Magallanes	1–1	1–2		3–1
S. Morning	1–5	2–3	0–4	

=== Group 2 ===
Team	Pld	W	D	L	GF	GA	GD	Pts
Coquimbo Unido	6	3	2	1	7	7	0	11
Cobresal	6	3	0	3	10	7	+3	9
Deportes La Serena	6	2	2	2	10	8	+2	8
Deportes Copiapó	6	1	2	3	8	13	-5	5

	CSAL	DCOP	DLSE	COQU
Cobresal		2–0	2–0	3–0
D. Copiapó	3–1		3–3	1–2
D. La Serena	2–1	4–0		1–1
Coquimbo U.	2–1	1–1	1–0	

=== Group 3 ===
Team	Pld	W	D	L	GF	GA	GD	Pts
Deportes Antofagasta	6	2	4	0	11	5	+6	10
San Marcos de Arica	6	3	1	2	8	9	-1	10
Cobreloa	6	2	3	1	9	6	+3	9
Deportes Iquique	6	0	2	4	4	12	-8	2

	DIQU	CLOA	SMAR	DANT
D. Iquique		1–2	0–2	1–1
Cobreloa	1–1		4–1	1–1
San Marcos	3–0	1–0		1–1
D. Antofagasta	3–1	1–1	4–0	

=== Group 4 ===
Team	Pld	W	D	L	GF	GA	GD	Pts
Unión Española	6	3	1	2	9	6	+3	10
Unión San Felipe	6	3	1	2	12	10	+2	10
Everton	6	3	0	3	9	11	-2	9
Unión La Calera	6	2	0	4	8	11	-3	6

	UESP	ULCA	EVER	USFE
U. Española		0–1	2–1	1–2
U. La Calera	0–3		4–1	1–2
Everton	0–1	2–1		2–1
U. San Felipe	2–2	3–1	2–3	

=== Group 5 ===
Team	Pld	W	D	L	GF	GA	GD	Pts
Universidad de Concepción	6	4	1	1	10	6	+4	13
Palestino	6	3	0	3	3	4	+2	9
Colo-Colo	6	3	0	3	7	8	-1	9
Rangers	6	1	1	4	6	11	-5	4

	COLO	PALE	UCON	RANG
Colo-Colo		0–1	0–1	3–1
Palestino	1–2		0–1	0–1
U. de Concepción	3–0	0–3		3–1
Rangers	1–2	0–1	2–2	

=== Group 6 ===
Team	Pld	W	D	L	GF	GA	GD	Pts
Lota Schwager	6	4	2	0	8	2	+6	14
Deportes Temuco	6	2	3	1	7	5	+2	9
Huachipato	6	2	2	2	8	9	-1	8
Deportes Concepción	6	0	1	5	8	15	-7	1

	HUAC	DCON	DTEM	LSCH
Huachipato		5–4	1–1	0–2
D. Concepción	1–2		1–1	1–2
D. Temuco	1–0	3–1		0–1
Lota Schwager	0–0	2–0	1–1	

=== Group 7 ===
Team	Pld	W	D	L	GF	GA	GD	Pts
Santiago Wanderers	6	4	1	1	17	8	+9	13
San Luis	6	3	1	2	9	10	-1	10
O'Higgins	6	3	0	3	9	11	-2	9
Barnechea	6	1	0	5	7	13	-6	3

	SWAN	OHIG	BARN	SLUI
S. Wanderers		2–0	1–3	7–2
O'Higgins	1–4		3–2	0–1
Barnechea	1–2	1–3		0–2
San Luis	1–1	1–2	2–0	

=== Group 8 ===
Team	Pld	W	D	L	GF	GA	GD	Pts
Ñublense	6	4	1	1	11	9	+2	13
Curicó Unido	6	3	1	2	10	8	+2	10
Universidad Católica	6	2	2	2	6	4	+2	8
Iberia	6	0	2	4	5	11	-6	2

	UCAT	ÑUBL	CURI	IBER
U. Católica		1–1	2–0	1–1
Ñublense	1–0		2–1	1–0
Curicó U.	1–0	5–2		1–1
Iberia	0–2	2–4	1–2	

== Second round ==
Team 1	Agg.	Team 2	1st leg	2nd leg
San Luis	3–3 (5-6p)	Unión Española	3–0	0–3
Cobresal	2–2 (4-5p)	San Marcos de Arica	1–1	1–1
Unión San Felipe	2–2 (6-5p)	Santiago Wanderers	1–2	1–0
Magallanes	3–4	Palestino	2–0	1–4
Lota Schwager	2–4	Universidad de Concepción	0–0	2–4
Deportes Temuco	3–3 (4-2p)	Ñublense	2–0	1–3
Coquimbo Unido	0–8	Deportes Antofagasta	0–3	0–5
Curicó Unido	1–4	Audax Italiano	0–0	1–4

== Quarterfinals ==
Team 1	Agg.	Team 2	1st leg	2nd leg
Deportes Temuco	0–2	Universidad de Concepción	0–1	0–1
San Marcos de Arica	2–2 (2-4p)	Deportes Antofagasta	2–2	0–0
Audax Italiano	2–3	Palestino	2–2	0–1
Unión San Felipe	1–1 (2-4p)	Unión Española	0–0	1–1

== Semifinals ==
=== First leg ===
14 January 2015	Deportes Antofagasta	1–1	Palestino	Mejillones
18:00	Álvarez 58'	Report	71' Contreras	Stadium: Municipal de Mejillones; Attendance: 990; Referee: Jorge Osorio

14 January 2015	Unión Española	2–1	Universidad de Concepción	Independencia, Santiago
21:15	Ferreyra 5'; López 65'	Report	79' Churín	Stadium: Santa Laura; Attendance: 1,873; Referee: Claudio Puga

=== Second leg ===
21 January 2015	Palestino	5–1 (6–2 agg.)	Deportes Antofagasta	La Cisterna, Santiago
17:00	Lanaro 2', 74'; M. Riquelme 18'; Ramos 24', 78'	Report	29' R. Riquelme	Stadium: Municipal; Attendance: 926; Referee: Roberto Tobar

21 January 2015	Universidad de Concepción	2–1 (3–3 agg.) (4–3 p)	Unión Española	Talcahuano
20:00	Muñoz 64', 90+4'	Report	76' Ferreyra	Stadium: CAP; Attendance: 2,096; Referee: Jorge Osorio
	Penalties
	Churín (penalty scored); Guastavino (penalty scored); Huentelaf (penalty missed); Muñoz (penalty scored); Vargas (penalty scored)		(penalty scored) Lima; (penalty scored) Ferreyra; (penalty missed) Salom; (penalty missed) Abán; (penalty scored) Scotti

== Finals ==
28 March 2015
19:10

Universidad de Concepción	3–2	Palestino
Díaz 4' (o.g.); Vargas 10'; Portillo (red card) 39'; Manríquez 80'	Report	81' Guajardo; 89' Cháves

Estadio Fiscal, Talca
Attendance: 3,360
Referee: Enrique Osses

Copa Chile
2014–15 Champion
U. de Concepción
Second Title

== Top goalscorers ==
Pos	Player	Club	Goals
1	(Paraguay) Carlos González	Magallanes	8
2	(Chile) Pedro Muñoz	Universidad de Concepción	7
3	(Chile) Ronnie Fernández	Santiago Wanderers	6
