= Rodrigo Ramírez =

Chilean footballer (born 1982)

Personal information
- Full name: Rodrigo Andres Ramírez Miranda
- Date of birth: 15 February 1982 (age 44)
- Place of birth: Rancagua, Chile
- Height: 1.77 m (5 ft 10 in)
- Position: Winger

Youth career
- O'Higgins

Senior career*
Years	Team	Apps	(Gls)
2001–2010	O'Higgins	92	(9)
2005	→ D. Concepción (loan)	26	(0)
2009	→ Everton (loan)	28	(2)
2010	Everton	8	(1)
2011–2012	Palestino	17	(0)
2012	→ Everton (loan)	10	(1)
2013–2014	Cobresal	14	(1)
Total		195	(14)
- * Club domestic league appearances and goals

Rodrigo Andrés Ramírez Miranda (born 15 February 1982) is a former Chilean footballer who played as a winger.

Known as Garrincha, Ramírez played for several Chilean clubs, including Everton, Cobresal and, most notably, O’Higgins, where he enjoyed the peak of his professional career. His performances in Rancagua consolidated his standing in domestic football.

== Club career ==
He developed his professional football career in various Chilean clubs, including Everton of Viña del Mar, Cobresal and O’Higgins of Rancagua. It was with the latter that he experienced the most prominent period of his sporting career.

During the 2008 season, the arrival of Jorge Sampaoli at O’Higgins marked a turning point in the team's performance and projection. The Argentine coach —later recognized as one of the most successful in the history of Chilean football— implemented a high-intensity, constant-pressure playing style that rapidly transformed the functioning of the Rancagua-based squad.

Ramírez was part of that squad alongside players such as Jean Beausejour, José Pedro Fuenzalida, Nicolás Diez and Carlos Carmona, among others who would later achieve national and international projection. His presence within Sampaoli's tactical system helped consolidate a competitive identity that left a lasting mark on the institution and on O’Higgins supporters.

== Personal life ==
Rodrigo is the father of the football forward from the Universidad de Chile, Vicente Ramírez.
