= Andrés Manzanares =

Argentine footballer

Personal information
- Full name: Andrés Manzanares
- Date of birth: 26 November 1984 (age 41)
- Place of birth: Bariloche, Argentina
- Height: 1.72 m (5 ft 8 in)
- Position: Right-back

Youth career
- Estudiantes Unidos
- Boca Juniors
- Quilmes

Senior career*
Years	Team	Apps	(Gls)
2000	Estudiantes Unidos	–	(–)
2001–2010	Quilmes	27	(1)
2009	→ Ñublense (loan)	6	(0)
2010–2011	Tristán Suárez	33	(3)
2011–2013	Temperley	68	(4)
2013–2014	Crucero del Norte	17	(0)
2014	Guaraní Antonio Franco	9	(0)
2015	Cruz del Sur	–	(–)
2016–2017	Defensores de Belgrano	22	(0)
2017	Puerto Moreno	–	(–)
2017	Cruz del Sur	13	(0)
2021	Arco Iris	–	(–)
2023	Estudiantes Unidos	–	(–)
2024	Arco Iris	–	(–)
- * Club domestic league appearances and goals

Andrés Manzanares (born 26 November 1984) is an Argentine former footballer who played as a right-back.

== Teams ==
- (Argentina) Estudiantes Unidos 2000
- (Argentina) Quilmes 2001–2009
- (Chile) Ñublense 2009
- (Argentina) Quilmes 2010
- (Argentina) Tristán Suárez 2010–2011
- (Argentina) Temperley 2011–2013
- (Argentina) Crucero del Norte 2013–2014
- (Argentina) Guaraní Antonio Franco 2014
- (Argentina) Cruz del Sur 2015
- (Argentina) Defensores de Belgrano 2016–2017
- (Argentina) Puerto Moreno 2017
- (Argentina) Cruz del Sur 2017
- (Argentina) Arco Iris 2021
- (Argentina) Estudiantes Unidos 2023
- (Argentina) Arco Iris 2024
