= Pablo Mannara =

Argentine footballer

Personal information
- Full name: Pablo Andrés Mannara
- Date of birth: 18 April 1977 (age 49)
- Place of birth: Lanús, Argentina
- Height: 1.79 m (5 ft 10 in)
- Position: Midfielder

Youth career
- Lanús

Senior career*
Years	Team	Apps	(Gls)
1994–1996	Lanús	1	(0)
1997–2000	Arsenal de Sarandí	77	(7)
2000–2001	Ferro Carril Oeste	22	(2)
2001–2004	Olimpo	71	(0)
2002	→ Tigre (loan)	11	(1)
2004–2005	Quilmes	4	(0)
2005–2006	Pontevedra	34	(2)
2006	Nueva Chicago	5	(0)
2007	Talleres	9	(0)
2007	Platense	13	(2)
2008	Almagro	31	(0)
2009	Cobreloa	11	(0)
2009–2010	Deportivo Armenio	10	(0)
2010	Deportivo Español	0	(0)
2011	Racing de Córdoba	19	(0)
2011–2012	General Lamadrid	21	(0)
2012–2013	Jorge Newbery VT	10	(0)
2013	Deportivo Laferrere	11	(2)
- * Club domestic league appearances and goals

Pablo Andrés Mannara (born April 18, 1977, in Lanús, Argentina) is an Argentine former association football midfielder.

== Teams ==
- (Argentina) Lanús 1994–1996
- (Argentina) Arsenal de Sarandí 1997–2000
- (Argentina) Ferro Carril Oeste 2000–2001
- (Argentina) Olimpo 2001
- (Argentina) Tigre 2002
- (Argentina) Olimpo 2002–2004
- (Argentina) Quilmes 2004–2005
- (Spain) Pontevedra 2005–2006
- (Argentina) Nueva Chicago 2005–2006
- (Argentina) Talleres 2007
- (Argentina) Platense 2007
- (Argentina) Almagro 2008
- (Chile) Cobreloa 2009
- (Argentina) Deportivo Armenio 2009–2010
- (Argentina) Deportivo Español 2010
- (Argentina) Racing de Córdoba 2011
- (Argentina) General Lamadrid 2011–2012
- (Argentina) Jorge Newbery de Venado Tuerto 2012–2013
- (Argentina) Deportivo Laferrere 2013

== Personal life ==
He is the older brother of the former football striker Rodrigo Mannara.
