= Juan Carlos Caballero =

Spanish footballer

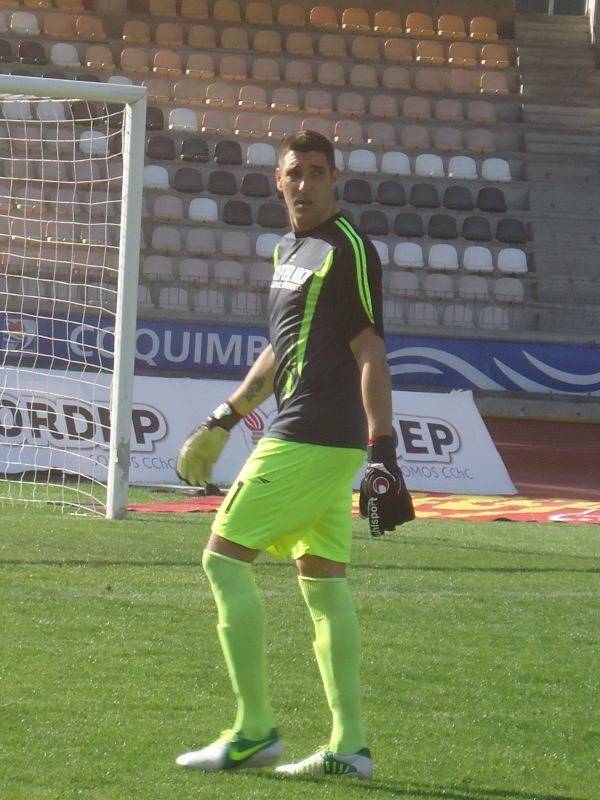
- Caballero in 2013

Personal information
- Full name: Juan Carlos Caballero Martín
- Date of birth: 29 September 1978 (age 48)
- Place of birth: Zaragoza, Spain
- Height: 1.90 m (6 ft 3 in)
- Position: Goalkeeper

Senior career*
Years	Team	Apps	(Gls)
1999–2001	Osasuna B	21	(0)
2001–2002	Figueres	23	(0)
2002–2003	Sevilla	1	(0)
2004	Terrassa	1	(0)
2004–2005	Eibar	1	(0)
2005	Lorca Deportiva	21	(0)
2005–2008	Cartagena	79	(0)
2008–2009	Benidorm	19	(0)
2009	Cobreloa	15	(0)
2009	Alicante	5	(0)
2010	Sangonera Atlético	18	(0)
2010–2011	Teruel	36	(0)
2011–2012	Conquense	40	(0)
2012	Orihuela	17	(0)
2013	La Serena	1	(0)
Total		298	(0)

Managerial career
- 2017–2018: Barcelona SC (reserves)
- 2019–2020: Guayaquil FC
- 2022: Atlético Santo Domingo
- * Club domestic league appearances and goals

Juan Carlos Caballero Martín (born 29 September 1978) is a Spanish football manager and former player who played as a goalkeeper.

== Club career ==
Born in Zaragoza, Aragon, Caballero spent the vast majority of his career in the Segunda División B, appearing in 279 matches in representation of ten clubs, mainly FC Cartagena. In the summer of 2002 he moved straight from the lower leagues to La Liga after leaving UE Figueres to sign with Sevilla FC, but he played understudy to Antonio Notario during his spell, his only competitive appearance arriving on 21 June 2003 (the last day of the season) in a 0–3 home loss against Valencia CF.

Caballero retired in 2013 at the age of 35 shortly after being relegated from the third tier with Orihuela CF, who had released him midway through the campaign. He also played two years in Chile, appearing for C.D. Cobreloa in the 2009 edition of the Primera División.
