= Francisco Portillo (footballer, born 1984) =

Paraguayan naturalized Chilean footballer

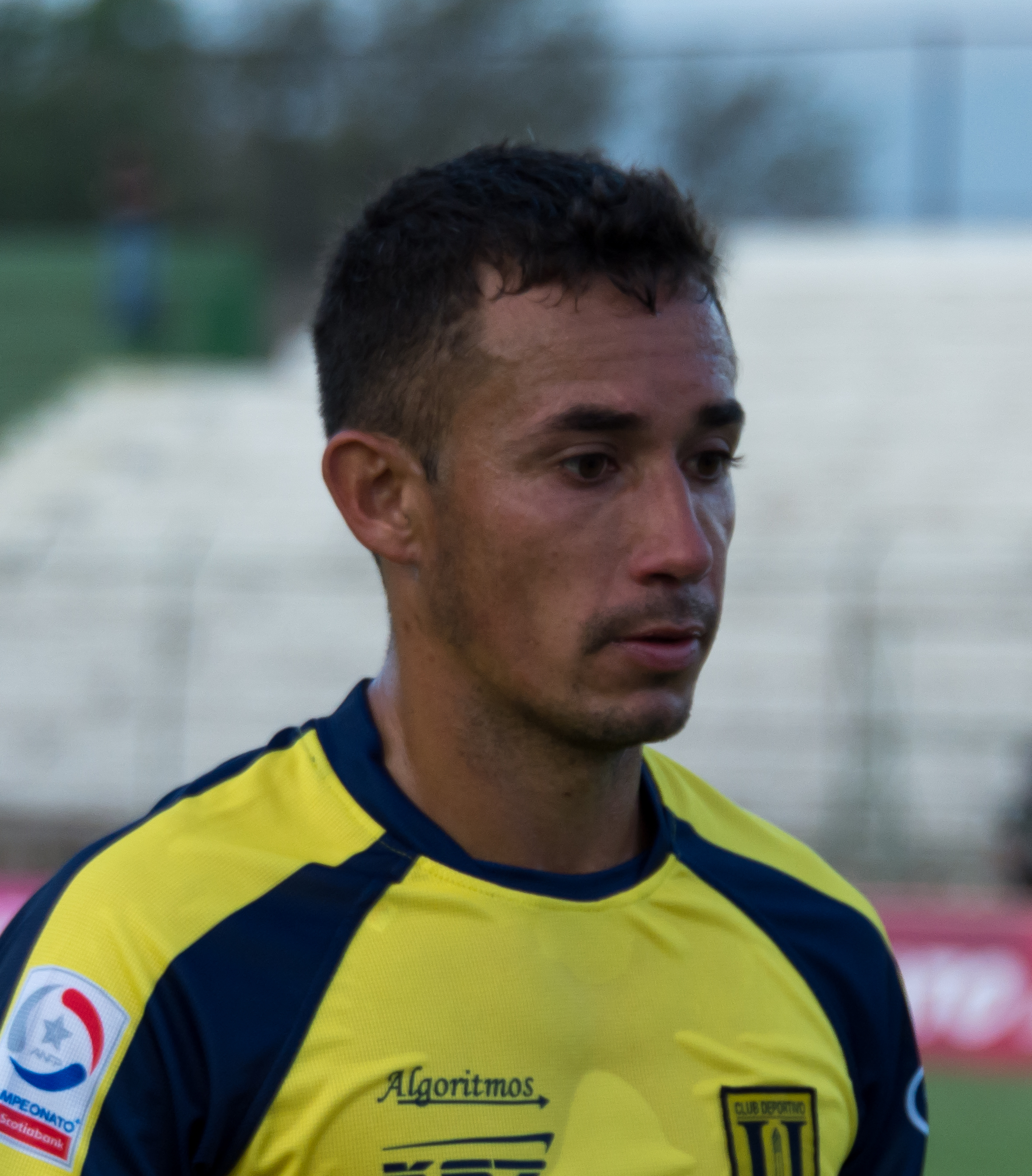
- Portillo with Universidad de Concepción in 2019

Personal information
- Full name: Francisco Leoncio Portillo Maidana
- Date of birth: 29 July 1984 (age 42)
- Place of birth: Santiago, Paraguay
- Height: 1.78 m (5 ft 10 in)
- Position: Midfielder

Senior career*
Years	Team	Apps	(Gls)
2007	General Caballero CG	–	(–)
2008	31 de Julio	–	(–)
2009–2020	Universidad de Concepción	146	(6)
2010–2012	→ Deportes Puerto Montt (loan)	90	(7)
2021	Guaraní de Trinidad	–	(–)
Total		236	(13)
- * Club domestic league appearances and goals

Francisco Leoncio Portillo Maidana (born 24 July 1984) is a former Paraguayan naturalized Chilean footballer who played as a defensive midfielder.

== Career ==
In his homeland, Portillo played for both General Caballero de Campo Grande and Deportivo 31 de Julio, where he coincided with the Paraguayan international Gustavo Gómez, before moving to Chile and trialing with Universidad de Concepción in 2008, joining them for the 2009 season.

A historical player of Universidad de Concepción, Portillo spent almost all his career with them in both the Chilean Primera División and the Primera B from 2009 to 2020, winning two titles. At league level, he made 146 appearances with six goals. In total, he made 183 appearances and scored seven goals.

He also spent three seasons on loan with Deportes Puerto Montt from 2010 to 2012.

In 2021, he played for Guaraní de Trinidad.

== Personal life ==
Portillo naturalized Chilean by residence.

== Honours ==
=== Player ===
Universidad de Concepción

- Primera B (1): 2013 Transición
- Copa Chile (1): 2014–15
