= 2009 Campeonato Nacional Primera División =

Primera División
- Season: 2009
- Champions: Apertura: Universidad de Chile; Clausura: Colo-Colo
- Relegated: Curicó Unido; Rangers; Municipal Iquique
- Copa Libertadores: Universidad de Chile; Colo-Colo; Universidad Católica
- Copa Sudamericana: Unión Española; Universidad de Chile
- Matches: 334
- Goals: 971 (2.91 per match)
- Top goalscorer: Apertura: Esteban Paredes (17 goals); Clausura: Diego Rivarola (13 goals); Season: Esteban Paredes (25 goals)

The 2009 Primera División del Fútbol Profesional Chileno season was the 78th season of top-flight football in Chile. The season was composed of two championships: the Torneo Apertura & Torneo Clasura.

== Format changes ==
The format for 2009 remains largely the same as 2008, except for the advancement to the Playoff Stages. Groups will no longer be used to determine who advance to the next stage. Instead, the top-eight teams in Classification Stage will advance.

=== International qualification changes ===
Qualification to the Copa Libertadores remains the same, as well as qualification to the Chile 1 spot in the Copa Sudamericana. The Chile 2 spot will be contested between the second-best team in the first stage and the 2008-09 Copa Chile winner. The winner of the single match will qualify to the 2009 Copa Sudamericana.

== Team information ==
The number of teams were reduced starting with this season from 20 to 18. Antofagasta, Osorno, Melipilla, and Deportes Concepción were relegated last season to the Primera B. They were replaced by Municipal Iquique and Curicó Unido.

Locations of the 2009 Primera División teams

Team	Current manager	City	Stadium
Audax Italiano	(Argentina) Pablo Marini	Santiago	Municipal de La Florida
Cobreloa	(Chile) Raúl Toro	Calama	Municipal de Calama
Cobresal	(Chile) José Cantillana	El Salvador	El Cobre
Colo-Colo	(Argentina) Hugo Tocalli	Santiago	Monumental
Curicó Unido	(Chile) Luis Marcoleta	Curicó	La Granja
Everton	(Uruguay) / (Chile) Nelson Acosta	Viña del Mar	Sausalito
Huachipato	(Chile) Pedro García	Talcahuano	CAP
La Serena	(Chile) Víctor Hugo Castañeda	La Serena	La Portada
Municipal Iquique	(Chile) Gustavo Huerta	Iquique	Tierra de Campeones
Ñublense	(Chile) Ricardo Toro	Chillán	Municipal Nelson Oyarzún Arenas
O'Higgins	(Chile) Gerardo Silva	Rancagua	El Teniente
Palestino	(Chile) Jorge Aravena	Santiago	Municipal de La Cisterna
Rangers	(Chile) Oscar del Solar	Talca	Fiscal de Talca
Santiago Morning	(Argentina) Juan Antonio Pizzi	Santiago	Municipal de La Pintana
Unión Española	(Uruguay) Rubén Israel	Santiago	Santa Laura
Universidad Católica	(Chile) Marco Antonio Figueroa	Santiago	San Carlos de Apoquindo
Universidad de Chile	(Argentina) José Basualdo	Santiago	Nacional
Universidad de Concepción	(Chile) Jorge Pellicer	Concepción	Municipal de Concepción

== Torneo Apertura ==
The Torneo Apertura, officially the Campeonato Nacional de Apertura de Primera División de Fútbol Profesional (English: Apertura National Championship of the First Division of Professional Football), was the first tournament of the season. It began on January 31 and ended on June 28.

=== Classification stage ===
==== Standings ====
Pos	Team	Pld	W	D	L	GF	GA	GD	Pts	Qualification
1	Unión Española	17	12	2	3	38	17	+21	38	2009 Copa Sudamericana First Stage
2	Universidad de Chile	17	9	4	4	33	21	+12	31	2009 Copa Sudamericana playoffs
3	Everton	17	7	7	3	24	17	+7	28	Playoffs
4	Santiago Morning	17	8	3	6	41	29	+12	27	Playoffs
5	Universidad Católica	17	8	3	6	26	18	+8	27	Playoffs
6	Municipal Iquique	17	7	5	5	27	23	+4	26	Playoffs
7	Audax Italiano	17	7	4	6	25	20	+5	25	Playoffs
8	O'Higgins	17	7	4	6	25	26	−1	25	Playoffs
9	Huachipato	17	7	4	6	26	29	−3	25	
10	Cobreloa	17	7	3	7	24	25	−1	24	
11	Universidad de Concepción	17	6	5	6	24	25	−1	23	
12	Ñublense	17	5	5	7	16	23	−7	20	
13	Colo-Colo	17	5	4	8	28	28	0	19	
14	Curicó Unido	17	5	4	8	24	28	−4	19	
15	Cobresal	17	4	7	6	23	34	−11	19	
16	Palestino	17	5	2	10	18	37	−19	17	
17	Rangers	17	3	5	9	20	28	−8	14	
18	Deportes La Serena	17	3	5	9	19	32	−13	14	

Updated to match(es) played on May 21, 2009. Source: RSSSF
Rules for classification: 1st points; 2nd wins; 3rd goal difference; 4th goals scored; 5th away goals

==== Results ====
Home \ Away	AUD	CLA	CSL	COL	CUR	EVE	HUA	SER	MIQ	ÑUB	O'HI	PAL	RAN	SAM	UES	UCA	UCH	UCO
Audax Italiano		0–0		2–1		0–1	2–0	1–2						1–1	2–2		1–2	
Cobreloa				2–0		1–0		1–1	0–2	3–0		4–0			2–1			2–0
Cobresal	1–0	1–4			1–0		0–0	2–2	2–5		1–1				1–3		3–2	
Colo-Colo			5–2			1–1	2–2		1–2		1–1			4–2		0–1		2–0
Curicó Unido	1–4	2–0		2–2				1–1					2–1		1–3	3–2	1–3	0–1
Everton			1–1		3–2		5–1		1–0			1–1	3–2	1–3	0–1		1–1	
Huachipato		3–2			0–0				3–1	3–1	3–0	4–1				2–0		0–1
La Serena				0–3		1–3	3–1			3–0	1–2	0–3		1–4	0–3	1–2		
Municipal Iquique	3–3				1–0			2–0			3–1	3–0	1–1	2–2		0–4		1–1
Ñublense	2–1		1–1	2–0	1–1	1–1			2–1				1–1	2–1				2–3
O'Higgins	1–2	1–1			5–3	0–1				1–1			1–0	3–2		3–1		
Palestino	0–2		2–0	1–0	0–4					1–1	1–2		1–0					4–2
Rangers	0–1	4–1	1–2	2–1			1–1	1–1							1–3	2–1	0–4	
Santiago Morning		2–0	3–3		0–1		5–0					5–1	2–1		1–3	0–1		5–4
Unión Española				5–2			4–0		2–0	1–2	2–1	2–1					0–1	2–1
Universidad Católica	0–2	4–0	1–1			1–1				1–0		4–1			1–1		0–1	
Universidad de Chile		4–1		1–3			1–3	3–2	0–0	3–0	2–2	3–0		1–3				
Universidad de Concepción	3–1		3–1			0–0		0–0			2–0		2–2			0–2	1–1	

Updated to match(es) played on May 21, 2009. Source: RSSSF
Legend: Blue = home team win; Yellow = draw; Red = away team win.

=== Playoff stage ===
Quarterfinals
1	Unión Española	1	6	7
8	O'Higgins	1	1	2
4	Santiago Morning	0	1	1
5	Universidad Católica	4	4	8
3	Everton	2	2	4
6	Municipal Iquique	2	1	3
2	Universidad de Chile	4	2	6
7	Audax Italiano	1	4	5

Semifinals
1	Unión Española	0	0	0 (4)
5	Universidad Católica	0	0	0 (2)
3	Everton	1	1	2
2	Universidad de Chile	0	3	3

Final
1	Unión Española	1	0	1
2	Universidad de Chile	1	1	2

Updated as of games played on July 7, 2009.

Primera Division
2009 Apertura champion
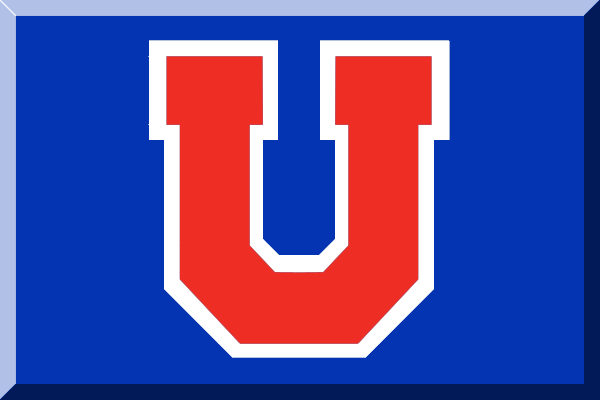
Universidad de Chile
13th title

Universidad de Chile qualified to the 2010 Copa Libertadores Second Stage.

=== Top goalscorers ===
Pos	Player	Club	Goals
1	(Chile) Esteban Paredes	Santiago Morning	17
2	(Argentina) Gustavo Canales	Unión Española	13
2	(Argentina) Rubén Gigena	Audax Italiano	13
4	(Argentina) Lucas Barrios	Colo-Colo	11
4	(Uruguay) Juan Manuel Olivera	Universidad de Chile	11
6	(Chile) Mario Aravena	Unión Española	10
7	(Chile) Milovan Mirosevic	Universidad Católica	9
7	(Chile) Leonardo Monje	Huachipato	9
7	(Argentina) Diego Rivarola	Santiago Morning	9
7	(Chile) Samuel Teuber	O'Higgins	9
7	(Chile) Gabriel Vargas	Universidad de Concepción	9

=== Copa Sudamericana playoff ===
The second-best team of the Classification Stage (Universidad de Chile) played a match at Estadio Municipal Francisco Sánchez Rumoroso in the city of Coquimbo against the 2008 Copa Chile champions, (Universidad de Concepción) for the Chile 2 spot in the 2009 Copa Sudamericana.

July 16, 2009
22:00 UTC−4

Universidad de Concepción	1–3	Universidad de Chile
Vargas 31'	Report	Olivera 34', 59'; Á. Rojas 90+1'

Estadio Municipal Francisco Sánchez Rumoroso, Coquimbo
Attendance: 10,000
Referee: Claudio Puga

Universidad de Chile classified to the Chile 2 berth for the 2009 Copa Sudamericana First Stage.

== Torneo Clausura ==
The Torneo Clasura, officially the Campeonato Nacional de Clausura de Primera División de Fútbol Profesional (English: Clausura National Championship of the First Division of Professional Football), was the second tournament of the season. It began on July 12 and was ended on December 16.

=== Classification Stage ===
==== Standings ====
Pos	Team	Pld	W	D	L	GF	GA	GD	Pts	Qualification
1	Universidad Católica	17	11	5	1	43	13	+30	38	Playoffs and the 2010 Copa Libertadores First Stage
2	Deportes La Serena	17	11	0	6	31	19	+12	33	Playoffs
3	Audax Italiano	17	9	5	3	26	22	+4	32	Playoffs
4	Colo-Colo	17	8	4	5	28	19	+9	28	Playoffs
5	Universidad de Concepción	17	8	3	6	23	23	0	27	Playoffs
6	Santiago Morning	17	8	2	7	22	25	−3	26	Playoffs
7	Unión Española	17	7	4	6	30	30	0	25	Playoffs
8	Everton	17	7	4	6	19	20	−1	25	Playoffs
9	Rangers	17	7	3	7	26	27	−1	21 (Note: Rangers was docked three points for using six foreign players during a game against Cobreloa.)	
10	Universidad de Chile	17	5	6	6	23	25	−2	21	
11	Cobresal	17	5	5	7	18	17	+1	20	
12	Palestino	17	5	5	7	16	20	−4	20	
13	Cobreloa	17	6	1	10	21	22	−1	19	
14	Ñublense	17	5	4	8	15	21	−6	19	
15	O'Higgins	17	4	7	6	17	23	−6	19	
16	Huachipato	17	5	2	10	21	29	−8	17	
17	Curicó Unido	17	4	8	5	16	25	−9	17 (Note: Curicó Unido was docked three points because they had more foreign players than allowed by the rules in a game against Universidad de Concepción.)	
18	Municipal Iquique	17	1	6	10	21	36	−15	9	

Updated to match(es) played on November 8, 2009. Source: RSSSF
Rules for classification: 1st points; 2nd wins; 3rd goal difference; 4th goals scored; 5th away goals

==== Results ====
Home \ Away	AUD	CLA	CSL	COL	CUR	EVE	HUA	SER	MIQ	ÑUB	O'HI	PAL	RAN	SAM	UES	UCA	UCH	UCO
Audax Italiano			0–0		1–1				2–0	2–1	1–1	2–2	1–0			0–4		2–1
Cobreloa	0–1		0–1		0–0		2–0				5–1		1–0	3–0		0–2	0–3	
Cobresal				0–2		2–0				0–0		0–1	2–0	3–1		1–1		3–0
Colo-Colo	0–1	2–1			1–1			2–1		3–1		1–2	3–0		1–1		1–0	
Curicó Unido			2–1			2–2	1–0		1–1	3–0	0–1	2–1		1–1				
Everton	1–2	0–3		3–2				0–1		1–0	1–1					1–1		0–1
Huachipato	2–2		2–1	0–2		1–2		2–0					0–3	0–1	1–2		2–0	
D. La Serena	4–2	4–2	3–2		2–0				2–1				2–0				3–0	0–1
Municipal Iquique		2–1	1–1	1–1		1–2	2–2			1–3					3–4		0–2	
Ñublense		1–2					3–0	1–0			1–0	1–0			1–1	0–0	0–2	
O'Higgins			2–0	2–2			2–1	1–3	2–2			0–1			2–0		1–1	0–2
Palestino		2–1				0–1	1–3	1–0	1–1					0–1	3–3	1–1	0–0	
Rangers					0–0	0–2			5–3	2–0	2–0	1–0		3–1				1–1
Santiago Morning	0–1			2–1		2–1		1–2	3–2	3–1	1–1						3–1	
Unión Española	2–4	2–0	1–0		3–1	0–1		1–4					3–3	0–1		4–3		
Universidad Católica				2–1	7–0		3–1	2–0	2–0		0–0		5–1	3–0				4–1
Universidad de Chile	3–2		1–1		1–1	1–1							3–5		2–1	2–3		1–1
Universidad de Concepción		1–0		1–3	3–1		2–4		2–0	1–1		2–0		2–1	1–2			

Updated to match(es) played on November 8, 2009. Source: RSSSF
Legend: Blue = home team win; Yellow = draw; Red = away team win.

=== Playoff stage ===
Quarterfinals
1	Universidad Católica	2	0	2
8	Everton	0	0	0
3	Audax Italiano	2	2	4
6	Santiago Morning	4	1	5
4	Colo-Colo	2	4	6
5	Universidad de Concepción	1	3	4
2	Deportes La Serena	1	2	3
7	Unión Española	1	1	2

Semifinals
1	Universidad Católica	3	5	8
6	Santiago Morning	0	3	3
4	Colo-Colo	1	3	4
2	Deportes La Serena	0	0	0

Finals
1	Universidad Católica	2	2	4
4	Colo-Colo	2	4	6

As of December 2009

Primera Division
2009 Clausura champion

Colo-Colo
29th title

Colo-Colo qualified to the 2010 Copa Libertadores Second Stage.

=== Top goalscorers ===
Pos	Name	Club	Goals
1	(Argentina) Diego Rivarola	Santiago Morning	13
2	(Chile) Rodrigo Toloza	Universidad Católica	12
3	(Argentina) Ezequiel Miralles	Colo-Colo	11
4	(Chile) Cristian Canio	Audax Italiano	10
4	(Argentina) Javier Elizondo	Deportes La Serena	10
4	(Chile) Roberto Gutiérrez	Universidad Católica	10

Updated as of games played on December 9, 2009.

=== Relegation ===
Relegation for this season will be determined by an aggregate table of the Classification Stages of both the Apertura and Clausura tournaments. The teams that finish 17th and 18th will be automatically relegated to the Primera B for the next season. The teams that finish 15th and 16th will play a relegation/promotion playoff against two teams from the 2009 Primera B season.

Pos	Team	Pld	W	D	L	GF	GA	GD	Pts	Qualification or relegation
1	Universidad Católica	34	19	8	7	69	31	+38	65	
2	Unión Española	34	19	5	10	68	47	+21	62	
3	Audax Italiano	34	16	9	9	51	42	+9	57	
4	Santiago Morning	34	16	5	13	63	54	+9	53	
5	Everton	34	14	11	9	43	37	+6	53	
6	Universidad de Chile	34	14	10	10	56	46	+10	52	
7	Universidad de Concepción	34	14	8	12	47	48	−1	50	
8	Deportes La Serena	34	14	5	15	50	51	−1	47	
9	Colo-Colo	34	13	8	13	56	47	+9	47	
10	O'Higgins	34	11	11	12	42	49	−7	44	
11	Cobreloa	34	13	4	17	45	47	−2	43	
12	Huachipato	34	12	6	16	47	58	−11	42	
13	Ñublense	34	10	9	15	31	44	−13	39	
14	Cobresal	34	9	12	13	41	51	−10	39	
15	Palestino	34	10	7	17	34	57	−23	37	Relegation/Promotion Playoff
16	Curicó Unido	34	9	12	13	39	53	−14	36 (Note: Curicó Unido was docked three points because they had more foreign players than allowed by the rules in a game against Universidad de Concepción.)	Relegation/Promotion Playoff
17	Rangers	34	10	8	16	46	55	−9	35 (Note: Rangers was docked three points for using six foreign players in a game against Cobreloa.)	Relegation to Primera B
18	Municipal Iquique	34	8	11	15	48	59	−11	35	Relegation to Primera B

Updated to match(es) played on November 8, 2009. Source: RSSSF
Rules for classification: 1st points; 2nd wins; 3rd goal difference; 4th goals scored; 5th away goals

==== Relegation/promotion playoff ====
By finishing 15th in the relegation table, Palestino was pitted against the San Marcos de Arica, the 2nd best team in the 2009 Primera B General Table. Curicó Unido, by finishing 16th in the relegation table, played against San Luis, the loser of the 2009 Primera B championship playoff. The team who obtains the most point after two legs will stay or be promoted to the Primera División. Should there be a tie on points, it will be settled as follows: 1) overall goal difference; 2) most away goal; 3) extra time of two 15-minute halves; 4) penalty shootout according to the Laws of the Game. The Primera División (Team #1) played the second leg at home.

Team #1	Points earned	Team #2	1st leg	2nd leg
Palestino	3–3 (4–2 p)	San Marcos de Arica	2–0	0–2
Curicó Unido	3–3 (2–4 gd)	San Luis	2–1	0–3

== See also ==
- 2009 in Chilean football
- 2009 Copa Chile
- List of 2009 Primera División de Chile transfers
