= Michael Lepe =

Chilean footballer (born 1990)

Personal information
- Full name: Michael Antonio Lepe Labraña
- Date of birth: August 13, 1990 (age 36)
- Place of birth: Concepción, Chile
- Height: 1.79 m (5 ft 10 in)
- Position: Midfielder

Youth career
- Naval

Senior career*
Years	Team	Apps	(Gls)
2005–2009	Naval	0	(0)
2008	→ Unión Temuco (loan)	–	(–)
2009–2017	Universidad de Concepción	153	(11)
2018–2021	Deportes Antofagasta	37	(4)
Total		190	(15)
- * Club domestic league appearances and goals

Michael Antonio Lepe Labraña (born 13 August 1990) is a Chilean former footballer who played as a midfielder.

== Career ==
Lepe retired at the end of the 2021 season.

== Personal life ==
In the context of the 2010 Chile earthquake and tsunami, Lepe was reported as missing for four days. Even though he was well, he had lost mobile phone signal and gone to his mother's home in Caleta Tumbes, a coastal town close to his hometown, Concepción. She had lost his house, boats and stuff.

== Career statistics ==
As of match played on 18 March 2018

Appearances and goals by club, season and competition
Club	Season	League			Cup		League Cup		Other		Total	
Club	Season	Division	Apps	Goals	Apps	Goals	Apps	Goals	Apps	Goals	Apps	Goals
Universidad de Concepción	2009	Primera División of Chile	14	1	0	0	—				14	1
Universidad de Concepción	2010	Primera División of Chile	4	0	0	0	—				4	0
Universidad de Concepción	2011	Primera División of Chile	12	0	4	0	—				16	0
Universidad de Concepción	2012	Primera División of Chile	24	1	7	1	—		1	0	32	2
Universidad de Concepción	2013	Primera División of Chile	15	2	4	0	—				19	2
Universidad de Concepción	2013–14	Primera División of Chile	21	1	1	0	—				22	1
Universidad de Concepción	2014–15	Primera División of Chile	11	2	8	0	—				19	2
Universidad de Concepción	2015–16	Primera División of Chile	20	3	10	0	—		3	0	33	3
Universidad de Concepción	2016–17	Chilean Primera División	23	1	1	0	—		2	0	26	1
Universidad de Concepción	2017	Chilean Primera División	9	0	2	0	—				11	0
Universidad de Concepción	Total		153	11	37	1	0	0	6	0	196	12
Deportes Antofagasta	2018	Chilean Primera División	23	4	2	0	—				25	4
Career totals			176	15	39	1	0	0	6	0	221	16
