= Cruz del Sur de Bariloche =

Argentine football club

Cruz del Sur
- Full name: Deportivo Cruz del Sur de Bariloche
- Founded: 4 November 1988; 36 years ago
- League: Torneo Argentino B
- 2011–12: 5th of Zona 1 (eliminated in first round)
- Website: http://www.deportivocruzdelsur.com/
Home colours	Away colours

Cruz del Sur is an Argentine football club located in the city of Bariloche of Río Negro Province. The squad currently plays in Torneo Argentino B, the fourth division of the Argentine football league system.
