= Leonel Mena =

Chilean footballer (born 1982)

Personal information
- Full name: Leonel Jonathan Mena Gutiérrez
- Date of birth: 23 September 1982 (age 44)
- Place of birth: Concepción, Chile
- Height: 1.79 m (5 ft 10 in)
- Position: Midfielder

Youth career
- Fernández Vial

Senior career*
Years	Team	Apps	(Gls)
2000–2006	Fernández Vial	36+	(4+)
2007–2012	Universidad de Concepción	95	(2)
2009–2010	→ Universidad Católica (loan)	24	(0)
2011–2012	→ Unión Española (loan)	12	(0)
2012–2014	Palestino	14	(1)
2014–2015	Deportes Concepción	12	(0)
2016–2017	Lota Schwager	21	(0)
2017	Deportes Vallenar	18	(0)
2019–2022	21 de Mayo Coronel	–	(–)
Total		232+	(7+)
- * Club domestic league appearances and goals

Leonel Jonathan Mena Gutiérrez (born 23 September 1982) is a Chilean former footballer who played as a midfielder.

== Honours ==
Universidad de Concepción

- Copa Chile (1): 2008–09

Universidad Católica

- Primera División de Chile (1): 2010

Deportes Vallenar

- Segunda División Profesional (1): 2017
