= Aníbal Domeneghini =

Argentine footballer (born 1985)

Personal information
- Full name: Eduardo Aníbal Domeneghini
- Date of birth: 15 March 1985 (age 41)
- Place of birth: Buenos Aires, Argentina
- Height: 1.78 m (5 ft 10 in)
- Position: Midfielder

Youth career
- San Lorenzo

Senior career*
Years	Team	Apps	(Gls)
2005	San Lorenzo	0	(0)
2006–2007	Olimpia		
2007	Comunicaciones		
2008	Unión San Felipe	21	(9)
2008–2011	Unión Española	27	(6)
2010	→ Cobreloa (loan)	29	(7)
2011	Marítimo	0	(0)
2011	Deportes Concepción	17	(1)
2012	Unión Magdalena	21	(3)
2012–2013	Los Andes	9	(0)
2013–2015	Deportes La Serena	91	(29)
2016	Deportes Puerto Montt	12	(1)
2017	Universitario de Sucre	28	(5)
2018	Deportes Vallenar	22	(7)
2021–2022	Maronese	5	(0)
- * Club domestic league appearances and goals

Eduardo Aníbal Domeneghini (born 15 March 1985), known as Aníbal Domeneghini, is an Argentine former professional footballer who played as a midfielder.

== Career ==
A product of San Lorenzo de Almagro, Domeneghini was a member of the first team for one season and mainly developed his career abroad. He made his senior debut with Paraguayan club Olimpia in 2006. Subsequently, he played in Chile, Portugal, Colombia and Bolivia.

In his homeland, he played for Comunicaciones, Los Andes and Maronese.

In the Chilean Primera División, Domeneghini stood out as a player of Unión Española and Cobreloa. After leaving Unión Española, he had a brief stint with Portuguese club Marítimo in 2011. Back to Chile, he joined Deportes Concepción.

In 2012, Domeneghini signed with Colombian club Unión Magdalena from Deportes Concepción.

His last club in Chile was Deportes Vallenar in the Segunda División Profesional.
