= Otelo Ocampos =

Paraguayan footballer (born 1983)

Personal information
- Full name: Otelo Ocampos Espínola
- Date of birth: 10 June 1983 (age 43)
- Place of birth: Escobar, Paraguay
- Height: 1.78 m (5 ft 10 in)
- Position: Forward

Senior career*
Years	Team	Apps	(Gls)
2004	Nacional	?	(?)
2005	Fernando de la Mora	?	(?)
2005–2006	River Plate	?	(?)
2007	Silvio Pettirossi	?	(?)
2009	Puerto Montt	13	(3)
2009–2011	U. de Concepción	56	(9)
2010	→ Deportes Iquique (loan)	20	(8)
2011–2012	Coquimbo Unido	30	(8)
2012	Sportivo Carapeguá	2	(0)
2013	Club 2 de Mayo	?	(?)
2014	Club Martín Ledesma	?	(?)
- * Club domestic league appearances and goals as of 31 August 2016

Otelo Ocampos Espínola (born 10 June 1983) is a Paraguayan footballer.

== Honours ==
=== Club ===
Deportes Iquique

- Copa Chile: 2010
- Primera B: 2010
