= Fernando Manríquez =

Chilean footballer (born 1984)

Personal information
- Full name: Fernando Alejandro Manríquez Hernández
- Date of birth: 1 February 1984 (age 42)
- Place of birth: Santiago, Chile
- Height: 1.68 m (5 ft 6 in)
- Position: Midfielder

Team information
- Current team: Santiago Morning
- Number: 21

Youth career
- Santiago Morning

Senior career*
| Years | Team | Apps | (Gls) |
| 2005–2008 | Santiago Morning | 23 | (0) |
| 2009 | Everton | 18 | (0) |
| 2010–2011 | Santiago Morning | 53 | (3) |
| 2012 | Unión La Calera | 35 | (3) |
| 2013 | Deportes Iquique | 14 | (0) |
| 2013–2019 | Universidad de Concepción | 173 | (31) |
| 2020–2022 | Coquimbo Unido | 45 | (0) |
| 2022– | Santiago Morning | 88 | (10) |

International career
| 2007 | Chile | 3 | (0) |
- * Club domestic league appearances and goals as of 5 April 2026

Fernando Alejandro Manríquez Hernández (born 1 February 1984) is a Chilean professional footballer who plays as a midfielder for Santiago Morning in the Segunda División Profesional de Chile.

== Career ==
An experienced midfielder, Manríquez has spent his entire professional in Chile, including three stints at Santiago Morning and over 170 appearances at C.D. Universidad de Concepción.

After ending his contract with Santiago Morning in December 2025, he renewed with them on 20 March 2026 for the 2026 Segunda División Profesional de Chile.

== Honours ==
Santiago Morning

- Primera B: 2005

Universidad de Concepción

- Copa Chile: 2014–15

Coquimbo Unido

- Primera B: 2021
