= Rony Pérez =

Chilean footballer

Personal information
- Full name: Rony Andrés Pérez Pérez
- Date of birth: 28 March 1984 (age 42)
- Place of birth: Machalí, Chile
- Height: 1.68 m (5 ft 6 in)
- Position: Midfielder

Youth career
- O'Higgins

Senior career*
Years	Team	Apps	(Gls)
2003–2007	O'Higgins		
2003	→ Colchagua		
2006	→ Colchagua		
2008	Cruz Azul Hidalgo	14	(1)
2009	Cobresal	14	(1)
2010	Curicó Unido	5	(0)
- * Club domestic league appearances and goals

Rony Andrés Pérez Pérez (born 28 March 1984) is a Chilean former footballer who played as a midfielder for clubs in Chile and Mexico.

== Career ==
A product of O'Higgins youth system, Pérez made twenty five appearances for the club in the Chilean Primera División in the 2007 season. He also played for Colchagua before joining Mexican side Cruz Azul Hidalgo in 2008.

Back in Chile, he joined Cobresal for the 2009 Apertura. In 2010, he played for Curicó Unido in the second level.
