= Mateo Martinelli =

Argentine footballer

Personal information
- Full name: Mateo Mariano Martinelli
- Date of birth: 9 January 1985 (age 41)
- Place of birth: Rosario, Argentina
- Height: 1.84 m (6 ft 0 in)
- Position: Midfielder

Youth career
- 2002–2006: Rosario Central

Senior career*
Years	Team	Apps	(Gls)
2006–2009	Independiente Rivadavia	30	(0)
2008	→ Guillermo Brown (loan)	15	(0)
2009	→ Curicó Unido (loan)	20	(0)
2010–2011	Talleres	22	(3)
2011–2012	Defensores de Belgrano	13	(1)
2012	Unión MdP	7	(0)
2013	Estudiantes RC	11	(1)
2013	San Marcos	9	(0)
2014–2016	Unión Villa Krause	36	(0)
2017	San Jorge	14	(0)
2018	Juventud Unida RC	–	(–)
2019	Juventud Alianza	6	(0)
- * Club domestic league appearances and goals

Mateo Mariano Martinelli (born 9 January 1985) is an Argentine former professional footballer who played as a midfielder.

== Teams ==
- (Argentina) Rosario Central (youth) 2002–2006
- (Argentina) Independiente Rivadavia 2006–2008
- (Argentina) Guillermo Brown 2008
- (Chile) Curicó Unido 2009
- (Argentina) Talleres 2010–2011
- (Argentina) Defensores de Belgrano 2011–2012
- (Argentina) Unión de Mar del Plata 2012
- (Argentina) Estudiantes de Río Cuarto 2013
- (Chile) San Marcos de Arica 2013
- (Argentina) Unión de Villa Krause 2014–2016
- (Argentina) San Jorge 2017
- (Argentina) Juventud Unida de Río Cuarto 2018
- (Argentina) Juventud Alianza 2019
