= Fredy Segura =

Chilean footballer

Personal information
- Full name: Fredy Eduardo Segura Donoso
- Date of birth: 5 January 1977 (age 49)
- Place of birth: Cabildo, Chile
- Height: 1.73 m (5 ft 8 in)
- Position: Defensive midfielder

Youth career
- Liverpool de Cabildo
- 1993: Cabildo (city team)
- 1994–1996: Huachipato

Senior career*
Years	Team	Apps	(Gls)
1997–1998	Huachipato	5	(0)
1997–1998	→ Hutt City (loan)		
1999	Universidad Católica	0	(0)
1999	Universidad Católica B	–	(–)
2000	Provincial Osorno	25	(1)
2001	Rangers	25	(0)
2002–2007	Universidad de Concepción	208	(3)
2008	Cobresal	34	(0)
2009	Deportes La Serena	12	(0)
- * Club domestic league appearances and goals

Fredy Eduardo Segura Donoso (born 5 January 1977), frequently and wrongly named Freddy Segura, is a Chilean former professional footballer who played as a defensive midfielder.

== Career ==
Born in Cabildo, Chile, Segura joined the Huachipato youth system in 1994, was promoted to the first team in 1997 under Andrija Perčić and made his professional debut against Santiago Wanderers in the same year. For the 1997–98 season, he moved on loan to New Zealand alongside his compatriot Patricio Almendra to play for Hutt City in the National Summer Soccer League.

Back in Chile, Segura joined Universidad Católica in 1999 and played for the B-team in the Chilean Tercera División. He continued with Provincial Osorno and Rangers de Talca the next two years in the Primera División.

A historical player of Universidad de Concepción, Segura joined them in 2002 in the Primera B, got the promotion to the top division in the same season and left them in 2007. As a member of them, he took part in both the 2004 Copa Libertadores and the 2004 Copa Sudamericana and became the runner-up in the 2007 Torneo Clausura as the team captain alongside players such as Jorge Valdivia and Jean Beausejour.

His last clubs were Cobresal and Deportes La Serena in 2008 and 2009, respectively.
