= Luis Patricio Núñez =

Chilean footballer (born 1980)

Luis Núñez
Personal information
- Full name: Luis Patricio Núñez Blanco
- Date of birth: 20 January 1980 (age 46)
- Place of birth: La Legua, Santiago, Chile
- Height: 1.78 m (5 ft 10 in)
- Position: Forward

Youth career
- 1990–1998: Universidad Católica
- 1999: Municipal Las Condes

Senior career*
Years	Team	Apps	(Gls)
1999	Jacksonville Cyclones		
2000–2004	Magallanes	68	(32)
2004–2005	Unión San Felipe	51	(9)
2006–2009	Universidad Católica	97	(28)
2007	→ Universitario (loan)	14	(3)
2009	Palestino	12	(1)
2010	Ñublense	8	(1)
2010	U. Católica del Ecuador	6	(0)
2011	O'Higgins	18	(2)
2012	Huachipato	12	(0)
2012	Deportes Concepción	14	(1)

International career^{‡}
2007	Chile	1	(0)
- * Club domestic league appearances and goals as of 18 March 2012 ‡ National team caps and goals as of 7 January 2011

Luis Patricio Núñez Blanco (born 20 January 1980) is a former Chilean footballer who played as a forward.

Núñez played internationally for one game of the Chile national football team in a game against Costa Rica prior to the 2007 Copa América. He played 28 minutes, coming off the bench in the 62nd minute, replacing to Humberto Suazo, in a 1–1 draw at the Estadio Fiscal de Talca.

== Honours ==
=== Club ===
Universidad Católica

- Primera División de Chile (1): Runner-up 2007 Apertura
