= Iván Guillauma =

Uruguayan footballer (born 1977)

Personal information
- Full name: Iván Marcos Guillauma Modernell
- Date of birth: 20 September 1977 (age 49)
- Place of birth: San José de Mayo, Uruguay
- Height: 1.70 m (5 ft 7 in)
- Position: Midfielder

Senior career*
| Years | Team | Apps | (Gls) |
| 1998–2001 | Progreso | | |
| 2002–2004 | Rentistas | 18 | (1) |
| 2005–2007 | Cobresal | 101 | (7) |
| 2008 | Cobreloa | 31 | (3) |
| 2009 | Santiago Morning | 13 | (1) |
| 2009 | Cobresal | 13 | (2) |
| 2010 | Deportes Iquique | 10 | (2) |
| 2011 | San Marcos | 18 | (1) |
| 2012 | Trasandino Socoroma | – | (–) |
- * Club domestic league appearances and goals

Iván Marcos Guillauma Modernell (born 20 September 1977) is an Uruguayan former professional footballer who played as a midfielder.

== Career ==
Born in San José de Mayo, Guillauma spent most of his football career playing in Chile. He had spells with Cobresal and Cobreloa. In 2008, Cobreloa manager Marco Antonio Figueroa and Guillauma had a conflict, resulting in Guillauma leaving the club.

He ended his career playing for Chilean club Trasandino de Socoroma after San Marcos de Arica.
