= Johan Fuentes =

Chilean footballer (born 1984)

Personal information
- Full name: Johan Patricio Fuentes Muñoz
- Date of birth: 2 February 1984 (age 42)
- Place of birth: Santiago, Chile
- Height: 1.69 m (5 ft 7 in)
- Position: Midfielder

Youth career
- Unión Española

Senior career*
Years	Team	Apps	(Gls)
2004–2008	Unión Española	50	(4)
2004	→ Curicó Unido (loan)	–	(–)
2005	→ Curicó Unido (loan)	–	(–)
2004–2006	→ Deportes Melipilla (loan)	78	(12)
2009	Curicó Unido	30	(3)
2010–2011	Cobreloa	32	(1)
2011	Unión La Calera	19	(0)
2012–2016	Cobresal	125	(16)
2016–2017	San Luis	19	(1)
2017–2018	Deportes Iquique	24	(0)
2019	Deportes Temuco	14	(0)
2020–2022	Deportes Santa Cruz	49	(1)
2023–2024	Trasandino	29	(0)
2025	Curicó Unido	1	(0)
Total		470	(38)
- * Club domestic league appearances and goals

Johan Patricio Fuentes Muñoz (born 2 February 1984) is a Chilean former footballer who played as a midfielder.

== Club career ==
A product of Unión Española, Fuentes made his senior debut with Curicó Unido in the 2004 Tercera División de Chile. He returned on loan to Curicó Unido in the second half of 2005, winning the Tercera División league title.

In 2015, Fuentes reached the Torneo Clausura playing with Cobresal.

After playing for Deportes Santa Cruz until the end of the 2022 season, Fuentes signed with Segunda División Profesional side Trasandino in the second half of 2023.

In March 2025, Fuentes returned to Curicó Unido and retired at the end of the season, aged 41.

== Honours ==
Unión Española

- Primera División: 2005 Apertura

Curicó Unido

- Tercera División: 2005

Cobresal

- Primera División: 2015 Clausura
