= Leonardo Iorlano =

Argentine footballer

Personal information
- Full name: Leonardo Mario Joaquín Iorlano
- Date of birth: January 6, 1986 (age 40)
- Place of birth: Santa Fe, Argentina
- Positions: Forward; attacking midfielder

Youth career
- 1994–2005: Unión de Santa Fe

Senior career*
Years	Team	Apps	(Gls)
2005–2006	Radnički Niš		
2006–2007	Paniliakos		
2007–2008	Nocerina		
2009	Cobreloa	2	(0)
- General Caballero
- Altos Chipión
2012–2013	Gimnasia y Esgrima	15	(1)
2013–2014	Defensores de Cambaceres	10	(0)
2014	Atenas de Río Cuarto		
2014	Deportivo Aguilares	11	(6)
2015	Sarmiento de Leones		
2015–2016	Villa Cubas	42	(14)
2017	Camioneros Argentinos	18	(10)
2019	Jorge Newbery	8	(1)
- * Club domestic league appearances and goals

Leonardo Iorlano (born January 6, 1986) is an Argentine retired footballer.

== Career ==
After playing 11 years with the youth teams of his hometown club Unión de Santa Fe, in 2005 he moved to Europe where he first played one season in Serbia with FK Radnički Niš. Then he moved to Greece where he played with Paniliakos F.C. In 2007, he moved to Italy where, after training with Foligno, he signed with A.S.G. Nocerina. He also hold Italian citizenship. In January 2009 he has signed a contract with Chilean club Cobreloa after coach Marcelo Trobbiani insisted on his signing. Next, he moved to Paraguay where he played for second-level side General Caballero.

He returned to Argentina and initially played with Altos Chipión from Belgrano. In 2012, he played with Gimnasia y Esgrima in 2011–12 Torneo Argentino A. The following season, he played in fourth level with Defensores de Cambaceres. In January 2014 he joined Atenas de Río Cuarto. Then he played in Argentino B with Deportivo Aguilares. In May 2015, coming from Sarmiento de Leones, he signed with Sportivo Villa Cubas. He played with Villa Cubas in Argentino B till end of 2016 when they ended up relegated. He finished his career in 2019 playing with Jorge Newbery de Comodoro Rivadavia.
