= Ever Amarilla =

Paraguayan footballer (born 1984)

Personal information
- Full name: Ever Luciano Amarilla Barreto
- Date of birth: 13 August 1984 (age 42)
- Place of birth: Asunción, Paraguay
- Height: 1.84 m (6 ft 0 in)
- Position: Forward

Youth career
- Ita Ybate

Senior career*
Years	Team	Apps	(Gls)
–2004	Ita Ybate		
2005–2006	3 de Febrero		
2007–2008	Sol de América		
2009	Curicó Unido	9	(3)
2009	Deportes Puerto Montt	15	(1)
2010–2011	General Caballero JLM		
2012	Sportivo Carapeguá	9	(1)
2013	2 de Mayo		
2014	Independiente FBC		
2015	Deportivo Caaguazú		
2015	Tacuary		
2016	Olimpia Itá		
2017	UE Engordany	10	(7)
2017	Pettirossi		
2018	Martín Ledesma		
2018	Guaireña		
2019	Cristóbal Colón		
2019	3 de Noviembre		
2024	25 de Noviembre		
- * Club domestic league appearances and goals

Ever Luciano Amarilla Barreto (born 13 August 1984) is a Paraguayan former footballer who played as a forward.

== Teams ==
- (Paraguay) Ita Ybate –2004
- (Paraguay) 3 de Febrero 2005–2006
- (Paraguay) Sol de América 2007–2008
- (Chile) Curicó Unido 2009
- (Chile) Deportes Puerto Montt 2009
- (Paraguay) General Caballero JLM 2010–2011
- (Paraguay) Sportivo Carapeguá 2012
- (Paraguay) 2 de Mayo 2013
- (Paraguay) Tacuary 2015
- (Paraguay) Olimpia Itá 2016
- (Andorra) UE Engordany 2017
- (Paraguay) Pettirossi 2017
- (Paraguay) Cristóbal Colón 2019
- (Paraguay) 3 de Noviembre 2019
- (Paraguay) 25 de Noviembre 2024
