= Roberval (footballer) =

Brazilian footballer

Personal information
- Full name: Emison da Conceiçao
- Date of birth: 27 June 1985 (age 41)
- Place of birth: Recife, Brazil
- Height: 1.74 m (5 ft 9 in)
- Position: Striker

Team information
- Current team: San Martín de San Juan

Senior career*
Years	Team	Apps	(Gls)
2006–2008	Santa Cruz	?	(?)
2008–	San Martín de San Juan	51	(8)
2009	→ Audax Italiano (loan)	23	(4)
- * Club domestic league appearances and goals as of 2 ‡ National team caps and goals as of 22/3/2010

Emison da Conceiçao (born 27 June 1985 in Recife, Brazil) is a Brazilian footballer who played for San Martín de San Juan of the Primera División in Argentina.

== Teams ==
- Santa Cruz 2006-2008
- San Martín de San Juan 2008-2009
- Audax Italiano 2009-2010
- San Martín de San Juan 2010–present
