= Ricardinho (footballer, born January 1982) =

Brazilian footballer

Personal information
- Full name: Ricardo Andrade Alves
- Date of birth: 12 January 1982
- Place of birth: Guarulhos, Brazil
- Date of death: 13 November 2019 (aged 37)
- Place of death: Guarulhos, Brazil
- Height: 1.83 m (6 ft 0 in)
- Positions: Right back; midfielder

Senior career*
Years	Team	Apps	(Gls)
2000–2002	XV de Piracicaba		
2003	Ituano		
2003–2004	SFC Opava		
2004	Itararé		
2005	Portuguesa Santista		
2006	Mogi Mirim		
2006–2007	Juventus-SC		
2007	São Luiz		
2008	Universidad San Martín		
2008	Brasil de Farroupilha		
2009	Caldense		
2009	Audax Italiano		
2009	Novo Hamburgo		
2010	Funorte		
2010	Atlético Três Corações		
2010–2011	Toledo		
2012	Poços de Caldas		
2012	Toledo		
- * Club domestic league appearances and goals as of 15 June 2026

Ricardo Andrade Alves (12 January 1982 – 13 November 2019), better known simply as Ricardinho, was a Brazilian footballer.

== Career ==
Having played primarily for countryside teams in São Paulo state, Ricardinho also played in the Czech Republic, Peru, and Chile. Ricardinho died in his hometown Guarulhos on 13 November, 2019, victim of a sudden heart attack.
