= Vicente Paciello =

Paraguayan footballer (born 1986)

Personal information
- Full name: Vicente Rodrigo Paciello Recalde
- Date of birth: 28 February 1986 (age 40)
- Place of birth: Concepción, Paraguay
- Height: 1.77 m (5 ft 10 in)
- Position: Forward

Senior career*
Years	Team	Apps	(Gls)
2006–2007	Fernando de la Mora	12	(1)
2008	12 de Octubre	15	(4)
2009	Deportes Iquique	5	(0)
2010	Independiente FBC		
2011	2 de Mayo		
2012	San Lorenzo		
- * Club domestic league appearances and goals

Vicente Rodrigo Paciello Recalde (born 28 February 1986 in Concepción, Paraguay) is a former Paraguayan footballer who played as a forward.

== Teams ==
- (Paraguay) Fernando de la Mora 2006-2007
- (Paraguay) 12 de Octubre 2008
- (Chile) Deportes Iquique 2009
- (Paraguay) Independiente de Campo Grande 2010
- (Paraguay) 2 de Mayo 2011
- (Paraguay) Sportivo San Lorenzo 2012
