= Pedro Muñoz (Chilean footballer) =

Chilean footballer (born 1986)

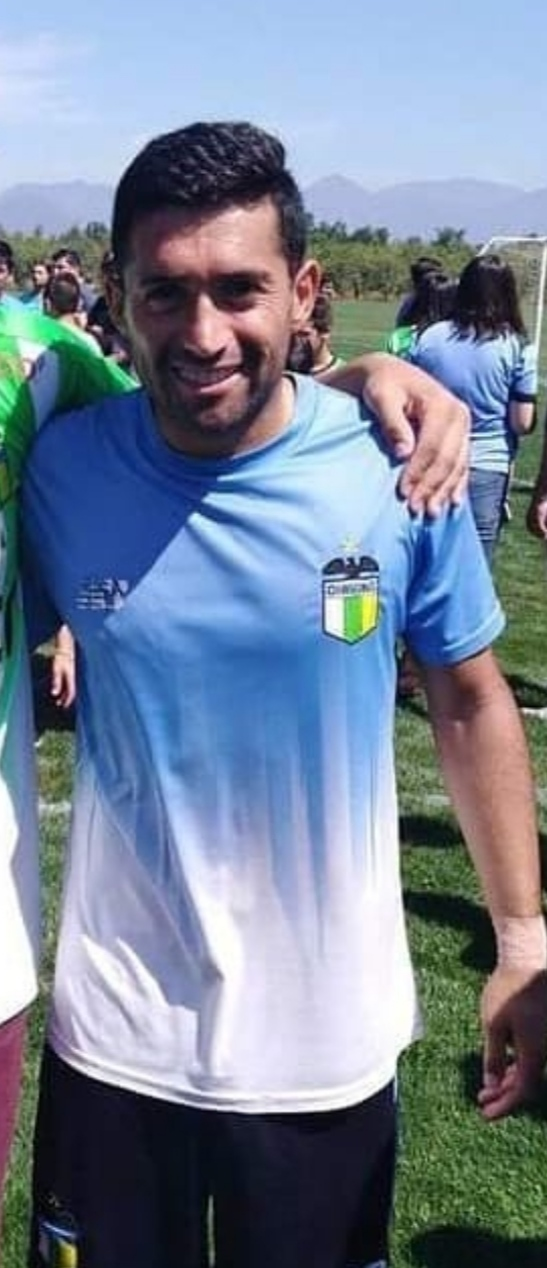
- Muñoz in 2025

Personal information
- Full name: Pedro Emiliano Muñoz Zuñiga
- Date of birth: 9 June 1986 (age 40)
- Place of birth: Las Cabras, Chile
- Height: 1.72 m (5 ft 7 1/2 in)
- Positions: Forward; winger

Youth career
- General Velásquez

Senior career*
Years	Team	Apps	(Gls)
2005	General Velásquez	–	(–)
2006–2009	Curicó Unido	66	(4)
2008	→ Cobresal (loan)	29	(5)
2009–2015	Universidad de Concepción	162	(30)
2015–2018	O'Higgins	67	(6)
2019	Coquimbo Unido	7	(0)
2020–2024	Deportes Santa Cruz	108	(28)
2025	Deportes Melipilla	7	(1)
Total		446	(74)
- * Club domestic league appearances and goals

Pedro Emiliano Muñoz Zuñiga (born 9 June 1986) is a Chilean former footballer who played as a winger.

== Career ==
Muñoz was signed by O'Higgins for 3 years in the beginning of the 2015–16 season. He came to the celestes after seven years in Universidad de Concepción, where was managed by Pablo Sánchez.

Muñoz retired in mid-2025. His last club was Deportes Melipilla.

== Post-retirement ==
Following his retirement, Muñoz became a football agent.

== Honours ==
Universidad de Concepción

- Copa Chile: 2008, 2014–15
