= Marcelo Medina =

Chilean footballer (born 1980)

Personal information
- Full name: Marcelo Nicolás Medina Zamora
- Date of birth: February 11, 1980 (age 46)
- Place of birth: Chile
- Height: 1.82 m (6 ft 0 in)
- Position: Defender

Team information
- Current team: San Marcos
- Number: 4

Senior career*
Years	Team	Apps	(Gls)
2001–2005	O'Higgins	17	(0)
2005	Deportes Concepción	33	(0)
2006	O'Higgins	14	(1)
2006	Cobresal		
2007	O'Higgins		
2008	Cobresal	25	(0)
2009	Coquimbo Unido	6	(0)
2010	Ñublense	8	(0)
2011–	San Marcos	61	(1)
- * Club domestic league appearances and goals as of 16:33, 28 March 2009 (UTC)

Marcelo Nicolas Medina Zamora (San Vicente de Tagua Tagua, Chile, February 11 of 1980) is a footballer from Chile. He plays as a defender with San Marcos in the Primera División de Chile using the jersey No. 4.
