= Juan Manuel Quevedo =

Argentine footballer

Personal information
- Full name: Juan Manuel Quevedo
- Date of birth: 15 November 1983 (age 42)
- Place of birth: Junín, Buenos Aires, Argentina
- Height: 1.74 m (5 ft 9 in)
- Position: Midfielder

Youth career
- San Lorenzo

Senior career*
Years	Team	Apps	(Gls)
2004	San Lorenzo	0	(0)
2005–2007	Estudiantes BA	72	(8)
2007	Racing de Ferrol	0	(0)
2007–2008	Temperley	48	(7)
2009	Palestino	29	(5)
2010	Rampla Juniors	2	(0)
2010–2011	Sarmiento de Junín	16	(0)
2011–2014	Unión Magdalena	81	(14)
2014	Atlético Bucaramanga	15	(0)
2015	Almagro	5	(0)
- * Club domestic league appearances and goals

Juan Manuel Quevedo (born 15 November 1983) is an Argentinian former footballer who played as a midfielder

== Teams ==
- (Argentina) San Lorenzo 2004
- (Argentina) Estudiantes de Buenos Aires 2005–2007
- (Spain) Racing de Ferrol 2007
- (Argentina) Temperley 2007–2008
- (Chile) Palestino 2009
- (Uruguay) Rampla Juniors 2010
- (Argentina) Sarmiento de Junín 2010–2011
- (Colombia) Unión Magdalena 2011–2014
- (Colombia) Atlético Bucaramanga 2014
- (Argentina) Almagro 2015

== Personal life ==
Quevedo holds Italian citizenship.
