= José Luis Zelaye =

Argentine footballer

Personal information
- Full name: José Luis Zelaye
- Date of birth: 17 December 1978 (age 47)
- Place of birth: General Alvear, Argentina
- Height: 1.83 m (6 ft 0 in)
- Position: Defender

Youth career
- Andes FC

Senior career*
Years	Team	Apps	(Gls)
1999–2002	Independiente	42	(1)
2002–2003	San Martín SJ	15	(1)
2003	Aldosivi	6	(0)
2003–2004	Cartaginés	20	(0)
2004–2005	Banfield	7	(0)
2005–2006	Luján de Cuyo	15	(0)
2006	San Martín Mendoza	12	(1)
2007	Gimnasia de Mendoza	10	(1)
2007	Luján de Cuyo	10	(0)
2008	Palestino	38	(1)
2009–2012	Huachipato	94	(4)
2012–2016	Pacífico	70	(5)
2016–2017	Ferro General Alvear	–	(–)

Managerial career
- Ferro General Alvear
- Ferro General Alvear
- * Club domestic league appearances and goals

José Luis Zelaye (born 17 December 1978) is an Argentinian former footballer who played as a defender.

== Club career ==
Zelaye joined Independiente from Andes FC and made his professional debut in 1999.

He mainly developed his career in Argentina. Abroad, he played in Costa Rica for Cartaginés and Chile for both Palestino and Huachipato.

== Coaching career ==
Zelaye has coached Ferrocarril Oeste General Alvear.

== Honours ==
=== Player ===
Palestino

- Primera División de Chile (1): Runner-up 2008 Clausura

==== Individual ====
- Primera División de Chile Best Centre Back (1): 2008
