= Martín Ferrando =

Uruguayan footballer (born 1979)

Personal information
- Full name: Rodolfo Martín Ferrando Arias
- Date of birth: 12 January 1979 (age 47)
- Place of birth: Salto, Uruguay
- Height: 1.84 m (6 ft 0 in)
- Position: Goalkeeper

Senior career*
| Years | Team | Apps | (Gls) |
| 2003 | Salto | | (–) |
| 2004–2006 | Cerrito | 61 | (0) |
| 2007 | Montevideo Wanderers | 12 | (0) |
| 2007 | Liverpool Montevideo | 7 | (0) |
| 2008 | Rangers | 37 | (0) |
| 2009 | Cerro | 14 | (0) |
| 2009–2010 | Santiago Morning | 51 | (0) |
| 2011 | Cobresal | 13 | (0) |
| 2013 | Salto | – | (–) |
- * Club domestic league appearances and goals

Rodolfo Martín Ferrando Arias (born 12 January 1979, in Salto) is a Uruguayan former professional footballer.

== Teams ==
- (Uruguay) Salto 2003
- (Uruguay) Cerrito 2004–2006
- (Uruguay) Montevideo Wanderers 2007
- (Uruguay) Liverpool 2007
- (Chile) Rangers 2008
- (Uruguay) Cerro 2009
- (Chile) Santiago Morning 2009–2010
- (Chile) Cobresal 2011
- (Uruguay) Salto 2013
