= Ronald Villalba =

Paraguayan footballer (born 1983)

Personal information
- Full name: Ronald Daniel Villalba Argüello
- Date of birth: 13 July 1986 (age 40)
- Place of birth: San Lorenzo, Paraguay
- Height: 1.78 m (5 ft 10 in)
- Position: Forward

Senior career*
Years	Team	Apps	(Gls)
2004	Olimpia	8	(0)
2005	General Caballero ZC	9	(2)
2006	12 de Octubre	1	(0)
2007	Sportivo Trinidense		
2007	Sportivo Luqueño	6	(0)
2008	Deportivo Azogues	18	(3)
2009–2010	Deportes La Serena	10	(2)
2010	Villa San Carlos	9	(2)
2010–2011	Tacuary	14	(1)
2012	Sportivo San Lorenzo		
- * Club domestic league appearances and goals

Ronald Daniel Villalba Argüello (born 13 July 1983 in San Lorenzo, Paraguay) is a Paraguayan former footballer who played as a forward.

== Teams ==
- (Paraguay) Olimpia 2004
- (Paraguay) General Caballero ZC 2005
- (Paraguay) 12 de Octubre 2006
- (Paraguay) Sportivo Trinidense 2007
- (Paraguay) Sportivo Luqueño 2007
- (Ecuador) Deportivo Azogues 2008
- (Chile) Deportes La Serena 2009–2010
- (Argentina) Villa San Carlos 2010
- (Paraguay) Tacuary 2010–2011
- (Paraguay) Sportivo San Lorenzo 2012
