= Cristián Torralbo =

Chilean footballer (born 1984)

Personal information
- Full name: Crsitián Vicente Torralbo Muñoz
- Date of birth: 20 April 1984 (age 42)
- Place of birth: Castro, Chile
- Height: 1.83 m (6 ft 0 in)
- Position: Goalkeeper

Senior career*
Years	Team	Apps	(Gls)
2006–2007	Huachipato		
2008–2009	Lota Schwager		
2009–2010	Everton		
2010–2014	Unión San Felipe		
2012	→ Puerto Montt (loan)		
- * Club domestic league appearances and goals as of 18 March 2020

Cristian Vicente Torralbo Muñoz (born 20 April 1984) is a Chilean footballer.

He played for Huachipato.
