= Ányelo Alvarado =

Chilean footballer (born 1985)

Personal information
- Full name: Ányelo Alvarado Hernandez
- Date of birth: 23 December 1985 (age 40)
- Place of birth: Puerto Montt, Chile
- Height: 1.80 m (5 ft 11 in)
- Position: Midfielder

Senior career*
Years	Team	Apps	(Gls)
2004–2013	Puerto Montt	167	(29)
2009	→ Cobresal (loan)	34	(6)
2011–2012	→ Concepción (loan)	38	(6)
2013	Lota Schwager	9	(0)
2014–2015	Deportes Linares	29	(10)
2015–2016	San Antonio Unido	18	(2)
- * Club domestic league appearances and goals as of 30 March 2020

Ányelo Alvarado Hernandez (born 23 December 1985) was a Chilean footballer. His last club was San Antonio Unido.
