= Isaías Peralta =

Chilean footballer (born 1987)

Personal information
- Full name: Isaías Ignacio Peralta Clavería
- Date of birth: 21 August 1987 (age 39)
- Place of birth: Santiago, Chile
- Height: 1.71 m (5 ft 7 in)
- Positions: Attacking midfielder; winger

Youth career
- Unión Española

Senior career*
Years	Team	Apps	(Gls)
2006–2009	Unión Española	19	(3)
2009	Deportes Iquique	3	(0)
2010	Trasandino	34	(7)
2011–2012	Unión San Felipe	12	(0)
2012	→ Deportes Temuco (loan)	5	(3)
2013	San Marcos	4	(0)
2014–2015	San Antonio Unido	46	(9)
2015–2016	→ Iberia (loan)	21	(1)
2017–2018	Deportes Santa Cruz	16	(1)
2018	San Antonio Unido	7	(1)
2019–2021	Deportes Valdivia	20	(1)
2021	Coquimbo Unido	3	(0)
Total		190	(26)

International career
2007	Chile U20	5	(0)
- * Club domestic league appearances and goals

Isaías Ignacio Peralta Clavería (born 21 August 1987) is a Chilean former footballer who played as an attacking midfielder.

== Club career ==
He developed his career in his homeland, playing for clubs such as Unión Española, Deportes Iquique, Unión San Felipe, Deportes Temuco, among others. His last club was Coquimbo Unido in the 2021 season and made official his retirement on 29 May 2023.

== International career ==
Peralta represented Chile at the 2007 FIFA U-20 World Cup, playing only one match. In the semi-finals against Argentina, he was almost tasered to death and lost consciousness for over 20 minutes after Chilean players clashed with Canadian police. He was also verbally and physically abused by the police, leading to allegations of racism and police brutality from Chilean fans.

== Honours ==
Coquimbo Unido

- Primera B (1): 2021

Chile

- FIFA U-20 World Cup: Third place 2007
