= Nicolás Diez =

Argentine footballer

Personal information
- Full name: Nicolás Ignacio Diez Parajón
- Date of birth: 9 February 1977 (age 49)
- Place of birth: Buenos Aires, Argentina
- Height: 1.73 m (5 ft 8 in)
- Position: Winger

Team information
- Current team: Argentinos Juniors (manager)

Senior career*
Years	Team	Apps	(Gls)
1994–1996	Argentinos Juniors	9	(0)
1996–2001	Racing Club	25	(2)
1998	→ Ferro Carril Oeste (loan)	14	(0)
2001–2003	Gueugnon		
2003	Deportivo Pereira		
2004–2006	Everton Viña del Mar		
2006–2008	O'Higgins	93	(3)
2009	Unión Santa Fe	8	(0)
2009–2010	Deportivo Táchira	27	(1)
2010	La Serena		
2010–2011	Mineros	18	(1)
2011	Ñublense	13	(0)

International career
1997	Argentina U20	2	(0)

Managerial career
- 2012–2015: Chile (assistant)
- 2016: Universidad de Chile (assistant)
- 2016–2017: Defensa y Justicia (assistant)
- 2017–2018: Argentina (assistant)
- 2017–2018: Argentina U20 (assistant)
- 2018–2019: Defensa y Justicia (assistant)
- 2019: Independiente (assistant)
- 2020–2021: Racing Club (assistant)
- 2021–2022: Defensa y Justicia (assistant)
- 2023: Atlanta
- 2024: Tigre (assistant)
- 2025–: Argentinos Juniors
- * Club domestic league appearances and goals

Nicolás Ignacio Diez Parajón (born 9 February 1977 in Buenos Aires) is an Argentine football coach and former player who played as a winger. He is the current manager of Argentinos Juniors.

== Club career ==
In July 2009, Diez signed for Deportivo Táchira of Primera División Venezolana for plays the Torneo Apertura 2009, in the same tournament Diez was proclaimed champions of the Apertura.

In 2011, he played for his last professional club: Chile's Ñublense.

== International career ==
Diez appeared for the Argentina U-20 in Malaysia, with players such as Esteban Cambiasso, Juan Román Riquelme and Pablo Aimar. He also having a good friendly relationship with Juan Pablo Sorín.

== Personal life ==
He naturalized Chilean by residence.

== Managerial statistics ==
As of 27 October 2026

Team	From	To	Record							
Team	From	To	M	W	D	L	GF	GA	GD	Win %
Atlanta	5 July 2023	31 December 2023	14	2	4	8	12	17	−5	14.29
Argentinos Juniors	1 January 2025	present	78	42	22	14	102	56	+46	53.85
Total			92	44	26	22	114	73	+41	47.83

== Honours ==
=== Club ===
Deportivo Táchira

- Primera División Venezolana (1): 2009 Apertura

=== International ===
- FIFA U-20 World Cup (1): 1997
