= Juan Cabral (footballer) =

Paraguayan footballer (born 1984)

Personal information
- Full name: Juan Antonio Cabral
- Date of birth: 19 June 1984 (age 42)
- Place of birth: Misiones, Paraguay
- Height: 1.79 m (5 ft 10 in)
- Position: Forward

Senior career*
Years	Team	Apps	(Gls)
	31 de Julio	–	(–)
2008–2014	Universidad de Concepción	109	(17)
2009	→ Cobresal (loan)	12	(0)
2011	→ Palestino (loan)	11	(1)
2011	→ Deportes Puerto Montt (loan)	17	(2)
2012	→ Lota Schwager (loan)	35	(12)
	Liga Misionera Sur	–	(–)
	15 de Mayo	–	(–)
Total		184	(32)
- * Club domestic league appearances and goals

Juan Antonio Cabral (born 19 June 1984) is a former Paraguayan footballer who played as a forward.

== Career ==
Born in Misiones, Paraguay, Cabral played in Paraguay for club 31 de Julio in his hometown and moved to Chile to play for Universidad de Concepción at age 25. He didn't feature regularly with the club, and went on loan to Cobresal during 2009. Manager Jorge Pellicer requested that Cabral return to Universidad de Concepción in 2010, and he impressed by scoring several goals for the club.

In January 2011, Cabral joined Palestino from Universidad de Concepción.

After, he played on loan for Deportes Puerto Montt and Lota Schwager.

He returned to his country of birth to play at amateur level for the Liga Misionera del Sur team, club 15 de Mayo, among others.

== Honours ==
Universidad de Concepción

- Copa Chile (1): 2009
