= Carlos Alzamora =

Chilean footballer (born 1986)

Personal information
- Full name: Carlos Sebastián Alzamora Esquivel
- Date of birth: 27 September 1986 (age 40)
- Place of birth: Santiago, Chile
- Height: 1.72 m (5 ft 8 in)
- Position: Striker

Youth career
- Academia Santa Inés
- Deportes La Serena

Senior career*
Years	Team	Apps	(Gls)
2004–2008	Deportes La Serena	35	(8)
2007	→ Cobreloa (loan)	3	(0)
2009	Cobresal	17	(4)
2009	Colegiales	8	(0)
2010	Unión San Felipe	16	(3)
2011	San Marcos	19	(2)
2012	Deportes La Serena	13	(0)
2013	Cortuluá	5	(0)
2014–2015	Deportes La Serena	1	(0)
Total		117	(17)
- * Club domestic league appearances and goals

Carlos Sebastián Alzamora Esquivel (born 27 September 1986) is a Chilean former footballer who played as a striker.

== Personal life ==
His twin brother, Hernán, is also a former professional footballer who worked as the general manager of Deportes La Serena following his retirement.
