= Braulio Armoa =

Paraguayan footballer (born 1978)

Personal information
- Full name: Braulio Alfredo Armoa Mendoza
- Date of birth: 3 November 1978 (age 47)
- Place of birth: Encarnación, Paraguay
- Height: 1.83 m (6 ft 0 in)
- Position: Defender

Senior career*
Years	Team	Apps	(Gls)
1998–1999	Sportivo Luqueño	0	(0)
2000	Universal	14	(2)
2001	Atlético Colegiales	8	(0)
2002	San Lorenzo	21	(2)
2003–2005	Tacuary	62	(1)
2005	→ Deportes Puerto Montt (loan)	14	(0)
2006–2007	Palestino	68	(3)
2008	Nacional	12	(0)
2008	3 de Febrero	11	(0)
2009	Sichuan FC	–	(–)
2009–2010	Curicó Unido	45	(2)
2011	Deportes Puerto Montt	16	(1)
2012	Rosamonte	4	(0)
Total		275	(11)

Managerial career
- 2023: 12 de Octubre
- * Club domestic league appearances and goals

Braulio Alfredo Armoa Mendoza (born 3 November 1978) is a Paraguayan former professional footballer who played as a defender.

His last club was Chilean side Deportes Puerto Montt.
