= Gabriel Vargas (footballer, born 1983) =

Chilean footballer

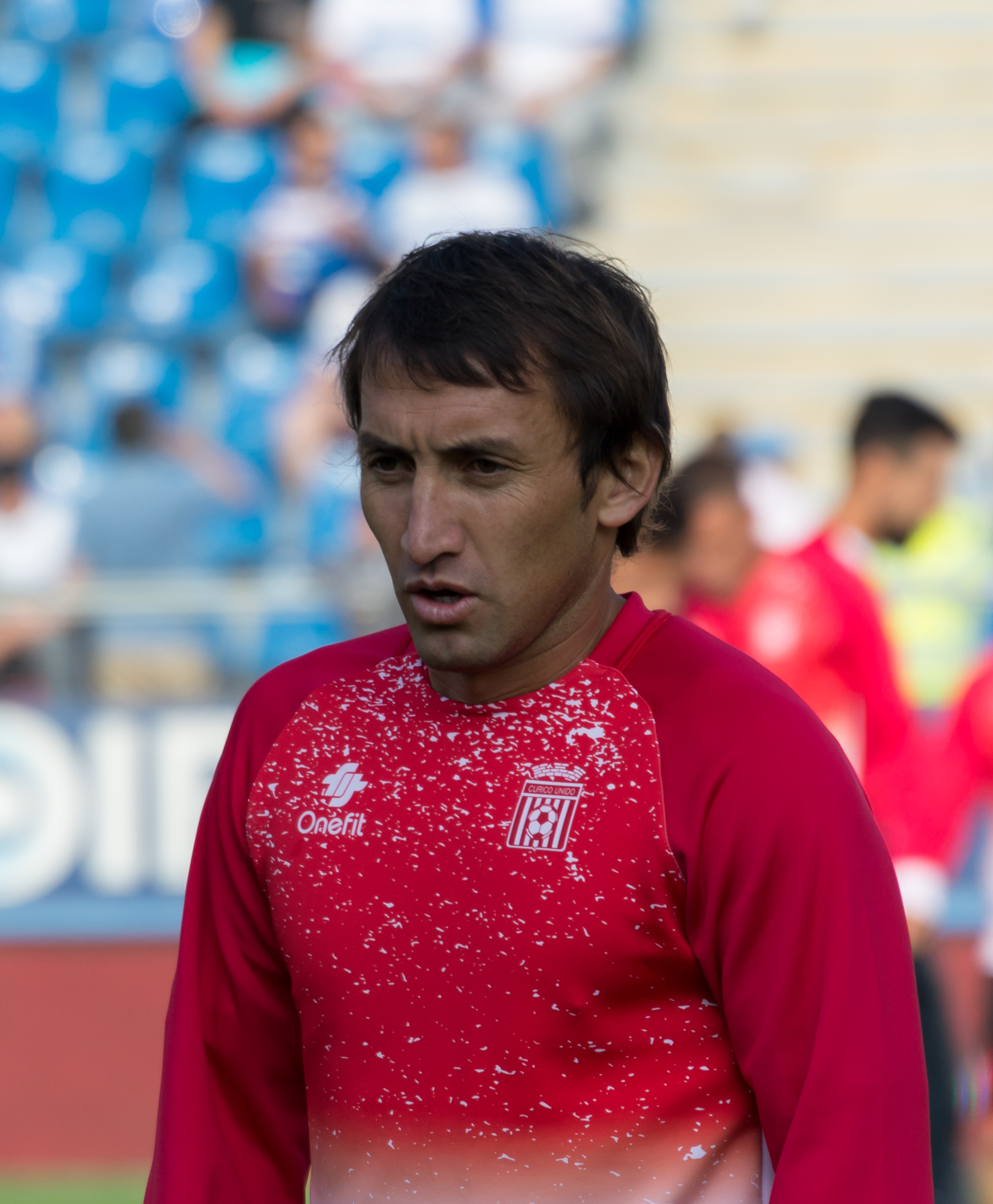
- Vargas with Curicó Unido in 2019

Personal information
- Full name: Gabriel Alejandro Vargas Venegas
- Date of birth: 8 December 1983 (age 42)
- Place of birth: Concepción, Chile
- Height: 1.73 m (5 ft 8 in)
- Position: Striker

Youth career
- Juventud Kennedy
- 1998–2001: Deportes Concepción

Senior career*
Years	Team	Apps	(Gls)
2001–2005	Deportes Concepción	50	(5)
2005	Andes IK	–	(–)
2006	Deportes Puerto Montt	34	(7)
2007	Cobresal	32	(17)
2008–2009	Universidad de Concepción	58	(37)
2010–2011	Universidad de Chile	48	(25)
2012–2016	Universidad de Concepción	135	(53)
2016–2017	Patronato	14	(1)
2017–2019	Curicó Unido	57	(9)
2020–2024	Deportes Concepción	93	(21)
Total		521	(175)
- * Club domestic league appearances and goals

Gabriel Alejandro Vargas Venegas (Note: In this Spanish name, the first or paternal surname is Vargas and the second or maternal family name is Venegas.) (born 8 December 1983), known as Gabriel Vargas, is a Chilean former footballer who played as a striker.

== Club career ==
He began on the youth squad of Deportes Concepción and debuted in 2002. After he was released in 2005, he moved to Norway to work as a stevedor, at the same time he played for Norwegian Third Division club Andes IK. In 2006, he played for Puerto Montt. In 2007, Vargas played for Cobresal where he was one of the team's leading goal scorers for the year. In the 2007 Clausura tournament, Vargas scored 11 goals.

In 2008, he moved to Universidad de Concepción. Then he moved to Universidad de Chile, to play 2010 Apertura and 2010 Copa Libertadores.

In 2020, Vargas returned to Deportes Concepción in the Segunda División Profesional. On 31 October 2024, he announced his retirement after the match against Deportes Melipilla. In total, he scored 214 goals at professional level.

== Personal life ==
He is nicknamed El Arcángel del Gol (The Goal Archangel) due to the fact that his name is Gabriel just like the biblical character.
