= Rodrigo Mannara =

Argentine footballer

Personal information
- Full name: Rodrigo Martín Mannara
- Date of birth: 24 December 1979 (age 46)
- Place of birth: Buenos Aires, Argentina
- Height: 1.70 m (5 ft 7 in)
- Positions: Forward; right winger

Team information
- Current team: Deportivo Roca

Senior career*
Years	Team	Apps	(Gls)
1999–2004	Lanús	77	(9)
2000–2001	→ Arsenal de Sarandí (loan)	24	(3)
2004	Racing Club	6	(0)
2005–2006	Arsenal de Sarandí	37	(2)
2006–2009	Cobreloa	76	(29)
2007	→ Deportes Puerto Montt (loan)	17	(5)
2009–2010	Universidad Católica	20	(2)
2010–2011	Unión Santa Fe	11	(0)
2011–2012	General Lamadrid	5	(0)
2012	Jorge Newbery VT	5	(0)
2014	Recreativo Larroudé	–	(–)
2014	Textil Mandiyú	10	(1)
2015	Libertad Sunchales	14	(1)
2016	SAT	–	(–)
2016	Argentino de Merlo	–	(–)
2017	SAT	–	(–)
2017–2019	Deportivo Roca	40	(4)
Total		342	(56)

Managerial career
- 2019: Deportivo Roca (assistant)
- * Club domestic league appearances and goals

Rodrigo Martín Mannara (born 24 December 1979 in Buenos Aires) is a former Argentine football forward.

== Career ==
Mannara's former clubs include Club Atlético Lanús, Arsenal de Sarandí and Racing Club in Argentina. He also played professionally for the Chilean senior clubs Cobreloa, Puerto Montt and Universidad Católica.

His last club was Deportivo Roca in 2019, when he assumed as assistant coach of Fernando Fernández, then the team captain and head coach.

== Honours ==
Universidad Católica

- Primera División de Chile (1): 2010
