= Cristián Canío =

Chilean footballer (born 1981)

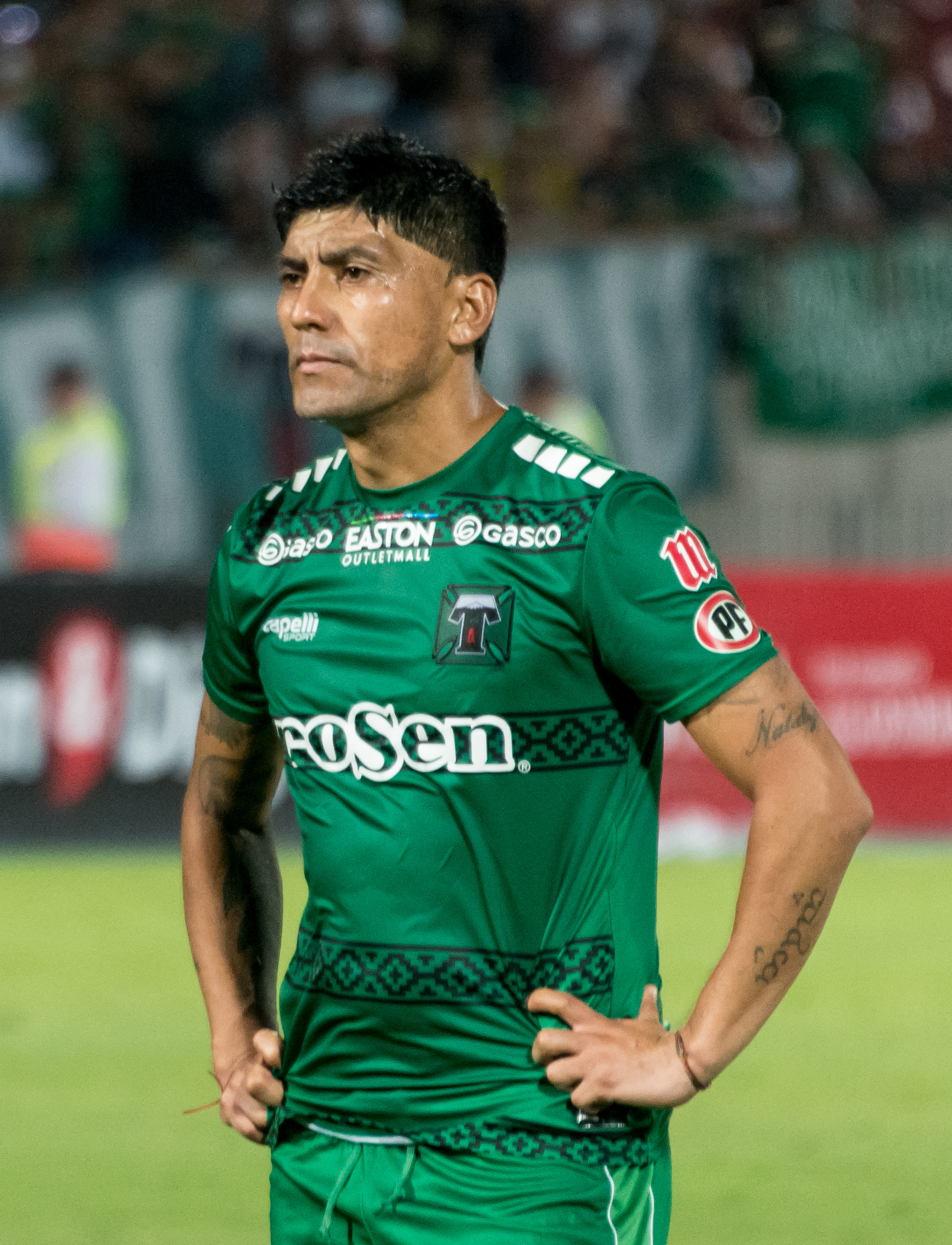
- Canío with Deportes Temuco in 2020

Personal information
- Full name: Cristián Eduardo Canío Manosalva
- Date of birth: 31 May 1981 (age 45)
- Place of birth: Nueva Imperial, Chile
- Height: 1.76 m (5 ft 9 in)
- Position: Forward

Youth career
- Deportes Temuco

Senior career*
Years	Team	Apps	(Gls)
2002–2004	Deportes Temuco	60	(17)
2002	→ Ñublense (loan)	–	(–)
2005–2006	Universidad de Chile	57	(17)
2006	O'Higgins	15	(3)
2007	Atlante	14	(1)
2007	Cobreloa	20	(12)
2008	Everton	38	(17)
2009	San Martín Tucumán	14	(4)
2009–2011	Audax Italiano	59	(23)
2010	→ Colo-Colo (loan)	7	(0)
2012	Cobreloa	31	(13)
2013–2014	Deportes Antofagasta	25	(5)
2014–2015	Everton	32	(7)
2015–2018	Deportes Temuco	98	(15)
2019	Coquimbo Unido	11	(3)
2020–2021	Deportes Temuco	29	(3)
2021	Deportes Valdivia	19	(1)
Total		529	(141)
- * Club domestic league appearances and goals

Cristián Eduardo Canío Manosalva (born 31 May 1981) is a Chilean former footballer who played as a forward.

== Career ==
Canío retired at the end of the 2021 season His last club was Deportes Valdivia in the Chilean Segunda División.

== Personal life ==
Canío is of Mapuche descent. His surname, Canío, comes from kaniw what means "crest" in Mapudungun.

== Post-retirement ==
Canío has worked for the sports department of municipality of Temuco alongside former footballers such as Hugo Droguett, Patricio Lira, among others. In addition, he owns a football academy for adults and children.

== Honours ==
Everton

- Primera División de Chile (1): 2008 Apertura

Deportes Temuco

- Primera B de Chile (1): 2015–16
