= Mathias Caserio =

Argentine footballer

Mathías Caserio
Personal information
- Full name: Matías Juan Jesús Caserio
- Date of birth: 18 December 1986 (age 39)
- Place of birth: Rosario, Argentina
- Height: 1.78 m (5 ft 10 in)
- Position: Midfielder

Youth career
- River Plate
- Rosario Central
- Newell's Old Boys
- Central Córdoba

Senior career*
| Years | Team | Apps | (Gls) |
| 2006–2009 | Central Córdoba | 35 | (4) |
| 2009 | Cobreloa | 7 | (0) |
| 2012 | Almafuerte | | |

International career
- Argentina U20
- * Club domestic league appearances and goals

Matías Juan Jesús Caserio (born 18 December 1986) is an Argentine former professional footballer who played as a midfielder.

== Career ==
Born in Rosario, Argentina, Caserio began his playing career with Central Córdoba in 2006 where he won a number of championships with the team. He stayed with them until 2009.

In 2009, Caserio played in Chile for Cobreloa in the top level.

At international level, he represented the Argentina under-20 national team.

Caserio continued playing football for clubs at regional level such as CSD Almafuerte.
