= Jairo Neira =

Chilean footballer (born 1986)

Personal information
- Full name: Jairo Alonso Neira Cortez
- Date of birth: 9 December 1986 (age 39)
- Place of birth: Curanilahue, Chile
- Height: 1.74 m (5 ft 8 1/2 in)
- Position: Midfielder

Senior career*
Years	Team	Apps	(Gls)
2005–2007	Universidad de Concepción	12	(0)
2007	→ Fernández Vial (loan)	19	(1)
2008	31 de Julio		
2008–2009	Silvio Pettirossi		
2009	Curicó Unido	3	(0)
- * Club domestic league appearances and goals

Jairo Alonso Neira Cortez (born 9 December 1986) is a Chilean former footballer who played as a midfielder.

== Career ==
Neira began his career with Universidad de Concepción in 2005.

After suffering an injury when he was a player of Fernández Vial, he emigrated to Paraguay and played for Deportivo 31 de Julio from Misiones and Silvio Pettirossi.

His last club was Curicó Unido in the 2009 season.
