= Jonathan Núñez (Chilean footballer) =

Chilean footballer (born 1986)

Personal information
- Full name: Jonathan Guillermo Núñez Espinoza
- Date of birth: 25 October 1986 (age 40)
- Place of birth: Talca, Chile
- Height: 1.68 m (5 ft 6 in)
- Position: Midfielder

Team information
- Current team: Deportes Copiapó
- Number: 20

Youth career
- Rangers de Talca

Senior career*
Years	Team	Apps	(Gls)
2004–2010	Rangers de Talca	38	(1)
2007	→ Palestino (loan)	29	(1)
2008	→ Curicó Unido (loan)	24	(0)
2011	Magallanes	23	(0)
2012	Santiago Morning	20	(0)
2013–2017	Deportes Puerto Montt	90	(3)
2018–	Deportes Copiapó	22	(0)
- * Club domestic league appearances and goals as of 8 November 2018

Jonathan Guillermo Núñez Espinoza (born 25 October 1986) is a Chilean footballer that currently plays for Deportes Copiapó in the Primera B de Chile.

He is nicknamed Mariachi in honour of his father.

== Club career ==
Born in Talca, he began his career at hometown club Rangers. He officially debuted in 2004 aged 18.

In 2007, after the relegation of Rangers to Primera B, he remained at the top tier after being loaned to Palestino, scoring one goal in 29 appearances in his only season. The following year, he was loaned again, this time to Curicó Unido in the second level, whilst Rangers achieved its promotion to the Campeonato Nacional.

In 2009, he finally returned to Rangers. However, they were relegated in a controversial way after a violation of the league's foreign players rule. He left the club in 2010.

Following spells at Magallanes (2011) and Santiago Morning (2012), Núñez joined Deportes Puerto Montt in January 2013. He helped the southern club win the Segunda División Profesional in the 2013–14 season, returning to the second tier of Chilean football.

== Honours ==
=== Club ===
Deportes Puerto Montt

- Segunda División Profesional: 2013–14
