= Rodrigo Riquelme (footballer, born 1984) =

Paraguayan-born Chilean footballer

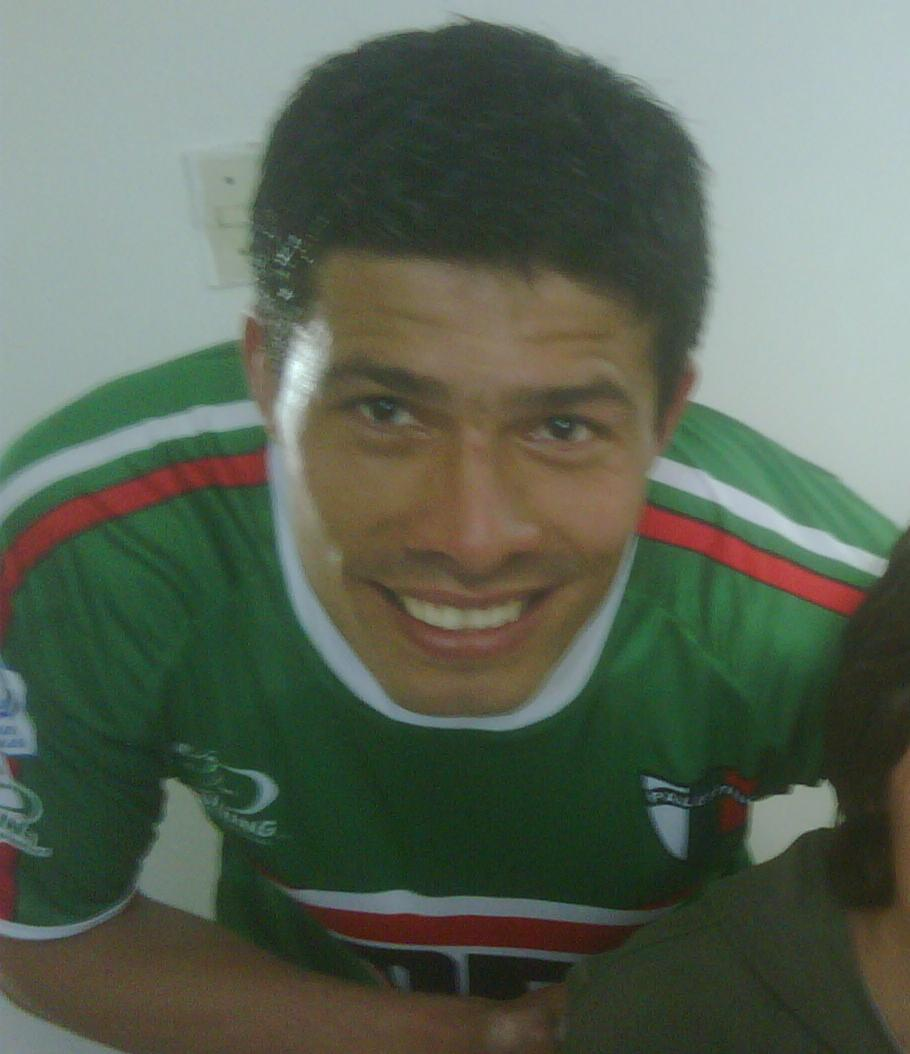

Personal information
- Full name: Rodrigo Fabián Riquelme Cabrera
- Date of birth: 1 June 1984 (age 42)
- Place of birth: Colonia de la Virginidad, Paraguay
- Height: 1.91 m (6 ft 3 in)
- Position: Defender

Senior career*
Years	Team	Apps	(Gls)
2003	Sol de América	0	(0)
2004–2005	Rangers de Talca	31	(2)
2006	12 de Octubre	0	(0)
2007	Rangers de Talca	47	(3)
2008	Curicó Unido	38	(1)
2009	Colo-Colo	9	(0)
2009–2014	Palestino	142	(7)
2015–2016	Deportes Antofagasta	37	(5)
2016–2017	Curicó Unido	25	(1)
2018	Santiago Wanderers	6	(0)
2019	San Luis	7	(0)
- * Club domestic league appearances and goals as of 21 March 2020

Rodrigo Fabián Riquelme Cabrera (born 1 June 1984) is a Paraguayan-born Chilean defender.

Riquelme's professional debut came for Paraguayan side Sol de América in 2003. He moved to Rangers de Talca in 2004, and he has played club football in Chile ever since.

Riquelme scored a historic goal against Puerto Montt, leading his club Curicó Unido to promotion to the Chilean Primera División, when he played for Curicó in 2008. He then made a controversial transfer from Curicó to Colo-Colo in December 2008.

== Honours ==
=== Club ===
Curicó Unido

- Primera B de Chile (2): 2008, 2016–17
