= 2013 Torneo Transición (Primera B de Chile) =

Primera B de Chile
- Season: 2013 Primera B
- Champions: Universidad de Concepción
- Promoted: Universidad de Concepción

The 2013 Torneo Transición was the 63rd completed season of the Primera B de Chile.

Universidad de Concepción was the tournament's champion.

== Classification ==
=== North Zone ===
Pos	Team	Pld	W	D	L	GF	GA	GD	Pts
1	Coquimbo Unido	12	6	4	2	20	11	+9	22
2	Magallanes	12	6	3	3	21	18	+3	21
3	Santiago Morning	12	5	6	1	17	10	+7	21
4	Unión San Felipe	12	4	4	4	11	16	−5	16
5	Deportes La Serena	12	3	3	6	11	15	−4	12
6	Deportes Copiapó	12	3	3	6	12	17	−5	12
7	San Luis de Quillota	12	3	1	8	14	19	−5	10

=== South Zone ===
Pos	Team	Pld	W	D	L	GF	GA	GD	Pts
1	Curicó Unido	12	6	5	1	17	9	+8	23
2	Universidad de Concepción	12	6	4	2	15	4	+11	22
3	Naval	12	5	3	4	14	14	0	18
4	Deportes Concepción	12	4	5	3	14	14	0	17
5	Unión Temuco	12	4	2	6	16	22	−6	14
6	Barnechea	12	3	3	6	15	21	−6	12
7	Lota Schwager	12	2	2	8	9	16	−7	8

== Promotion play-offs ==
Semifinals
1	Curicó Unido	2	1	3
2	Magallanes	1	0	1
1	Coquimbo Unido	1	1	2
2	Universidad de Concepción	3	1	4

Final
1	Curicó Unido	1
2	Universidad de Concepción	2
