= 1981 in Chile =

- Decades: 1960s; 1970s; 1980s; 1990s; 2000s
- See also: Other events of 1981; Timeline of Chilean history

The following lists events that happened during 1981 in Chile.

== Incumbents ==
- President of Chile: Augusto Pinochet

== Events ==
=== January ===
- January 10 – The Santa Maria Tower is inaugurated on the slopes of San Cristóbal Hill in the commune of Providencia, the highest in the country until 1994.

=== February ===
- February 18–23 – The XXII Viña del Mar International Song Festival is held. Its conductors are Antonio Vodanovic and María Olga Fernández.
- February 28 – The Viña del Mar psychopaths murder Fernando Lagunas Alfaro, a businessman, and Delia del Carmen González Apablaza, a prostitute known by the nickname of La Topogigio near the Estero Marga Marga River of Viña del Mar.

=== March ===
- March 2 – The Catholic University of the North expels the writer from Antofagasta Andrés Sabella, Doctor Honoris Causa and member of the Academia Chilena de la Lengua.
- March 6 – Decree Law N1 1-3260 is created, which created new administrative zones (the commune).
- March 11 – the Political Constitution of the Republic of Chile of 1980, plebiscitated and approved on September 11 of the previous year, comes into force. After Te Deum, the military government moved to La Moneda, leaving the Diego Portales Building as Legislative Power until 1990.
- March 21 – Fire in the Torre Santa María. The fire starts at 10:00 on the tenth floor; 11 people die. The incident exposes the problem of fires in tall buildings, and plans begin to address the issue.

=== May ===
- May 1 – The new pension system comes into force, with which the Pension Fund Administrators (AFP) appear.
- May 15 – Education is municipalized, to decentralize educational administration.
- May 18 – A violent tornado destroys the center of San Carlos. The tornado (named Carlos) appears about 55 km (34 mi) west of the city and disappears before reaching the town of Cachapoal.
- May 22 – The Viña del Mar Sugar Refinery Company (CRAV) declares bankruptcy.
- May 25 – The Viña del Mar psychopaths assassinate taxi driver Luis Morales Álvarez near Reñaca Beach and worker Jorge Inostroza on the road to Concón, where they also rape Margarita Santibáñez Ibaceta .

=== July ===
- July 23–29 – Strong temperature drops are recorded in much of the country. Snow falls in cities like La Serena and Copiapó, where previously thought impossible.
- July 28 – The Viña del Mar psychopaths murder the taxi driver Raúl Aedo León on Camino El Olivar and Tomás Noguera Inostroza, a bank employee, on the road to Limache and they also rape Ana María Riveros.

=== August ===
- August 23 – The Military Junta of the Military Government establishes September 11 as a holiday with the title of National Liberation Day.

=== September ===
- September 1 – The Spanish writer Corín Tellado visits the country.

=== October ===
- October 16 – An earthquake measuring 7.5 on the Richter scale affects the area of La Ligua and Petorca. No fatalities were reported.
- October 30 – The Ministry of Finance announces the intervention of the Linares, Talca, Fomento de Valparaíso, and Español-Chile banks. The measure becomes effective on November 2.

=== November ===
- November 1 – The Viña del Mar psychopaths assassinated Jaime Ventura and Roxana Venegas in the Caleta Abarca sector, under the Capuchin Bridge of Viña del Mar. This was the last crime committed by the criminals.
- November 26 – The Apumanque shopping center is inaugurated, in the commune of Las Condes.
- November 27 – A bus from the Flecha Dorada company collides with a truck near the city of San Carlos, resulting in 30 deaths and 17 injuries.

=== December ===
- December 11–12 – The 1981 Chilean telethon is held.
- December 11 – Agents of the CNI, Investigations and Carabineros, kill the MIR militants María Verónica Cienfuegos and Sergio Flores in a house on Rivadavia street in the commune of San Joaquín.

== Births ==
- 11 January – Jaime Valdés
- 1 February – Nelson Pinto
- 15 February – Cristian Muñoz (racewalker)
- 26 February – Pamela Díaz
- 15 March – Cristián Arriagada
- 16 March – Leonardo Monje
- 9 May – Johnny Herrera (goalkeeper)
- 10 May – Humberto Suazo
- 31 May – Cristián Canío
- 26 July – Miguel Ángel Ayala
- 30 July – Eduardo Lobos
- 4 August – Ismael Fuentes
- 20 August – Mario Esteban Berríos
- 21 August – Jonathan Novoa
- 9 September – Julio Peralta
- 17 September – Gonzalo Villagra
- 27 October – Marcel Holmberg
- 3 November – Rodrigo Millar
- 22 November – Braulio Leal
- 12 December – Wladimir Herrera

== Deaths ==
- 23 May – Laura Allende (b. 1911)
