= 1983 in Chile =

- Decades: 1960s; 1970s; 1980s; 1990s; 2000s
- See also: Other events of 1983; Timeline of Chilean history

Patagonia, 1983

The following lists events that happened during 1983 in Chile.

== Incumbents ==
- President of Chile: Augusto Pinochet

== Events ==
=== January ===
- 1 January – The economic crisis continues in the country reaching a 22% increase in inflation.
- 8 January – Jorge Sagredo Pizarro and Carlos Alberto Topp Collins, the Viña del Mar psychopaths, are sentenced to death by the Visiting Minister Julio Torres Allú.
- 13 January – The Chilean government takes over eight banks in response to the Crisis of 1982.

=== February ===
- 1 February – Inflation reaches 23.1%
- 14 February – Change of cabinet; the bi-minister of Finance and Economy, Rolf Lüders, is replaced by Carlos Cáceres Contreras (Finance) and Manuel Martín (Economy). They also assume in their respective portfolios Miguel Schweitzer Walters (Foreign Relations), Mónica Madariaga (Education), Jaime del Valle (Justice) and Ramón Suárez (General Secretary of Government).

=== March ===
- 1 March – Inflation reaches 24.9%
- 2 March – The National Party is refounded.

=== April ===
- 1 April – Inflation reaches 28.8%

=== May ===
- 1 May – Inflation reaches 31.2%
- 11 May – The First Day of Jornadas de Protesta Nacional takes place, called by the Confederation of Copper Workers, to express their opposition to the Military government of Augusto Pinochet.
- 15 May – Canal 13 moves to the new studios on Inés Matte Urrejola street, at the foot of the San Cristobal hill.

=== June ===
- 1 June - Inflation reaches 32.4%, this being the maximum peak of the crisis of 1982, this being the third most important economic crisis in the history of Chile only surpassed by the economic crisis of 1929 and the economic crisis of 1973 during the socialist government of Salvador Allende which, with 606% inflation, was the biggest economic crisis in the history of the country.
- 10 June – Juan Francisco Fresno assumes as Archbishop of Santiago after the resignation of Raúl Silva Henríquez.
- 14 June – Second Day of National Protest. Two protesters died on the occasion.

=== July ===
- 12 July – Third Day of National Protest. The incidents leave a result of 4 people dead.

=== August ===
- 10 August – Change of ministerial cabinet. Sergio Onofre Jarpa (Interior), Andrés Passicot (Economy), Hugo Gálvez (Labor), Winston Chinchón (Health), Modesto Collados (Housing), Enrique Escobar (Transportation and Telecommunications) and Alfonso Márquez de la Plata ( General secretary of government).
- 11–12 August – Fourth Day of National Protest. A curfew is declared at 6:30 p.m. The final balance of the protests is 27 dead.
- 30 August – The Mayor of Santiago, General (R) Carol Urzúa, along with his two bodyguards, is assassinated at the hands of the MIR.

=== September ===
- 7 September – Agents from the CNI, Investigations and Carabineros shot 5 MIR militants in two safe houses of the movement located in the communes of Las Condes and Quinta Normal. In these events, a 16-year-old teenager survived, who lived in one of the safe houses.
- 8–11 September – Four days of National Protest take place, in which nine people die.
- 11 September – On the 10th anniversary of the 1973 coup, the Avanzada Nacional party is founded.
- 16 September – The Gala department store chain ends its operations in Chile, selling its location in the Parque Arauco shopping center to Falabella.
- 24 September – The Independent Democratic Union (UDI) is founded.

=== October ===
- 11 October – The first massive concentration of opponents of the military government takes place; The event takes place at the intersection of General Velásquez avenue and Alameda, convened by Proden (National Development Project), headed by Jorge Lavandero.
- 15 October – The National Action Movement is founded.
- 20 October – Centenary of the Treaty of Ancón.

=== November ===
- 18 November – A massive rally is held in O'Higgins Park, called by the Democratic Alliance and which becomes the second massive activity in opposition to the military government, During the meeting, the speech of Enrique Silva Cimma, former Christian Democrat minister of the government of Eduardo Frei Montalva, "The united opposition begins the great crusade for the urgent restoration of an authentic democracy" stood out, Also during the event, the left-wing slogan "He who does not jump is Pinochet" became popular, gaining popularity among opponents of the military government throughout the decade.
- 27 November – Militants of the National Party found the National Union Movement.

=== December ===
- 14 December – With an electrical blackout in the central zone of the country, the Manuel Rodríguez Patriotic Front, the armed wing of the Communist Party, begins its activities

== Births ==
- 23 February – Rodrigo Brito, footballer
- 11 March – Diego Alejandro Silva, footballer
- 2 April – Paul Capdeville, tennis player
- 13 April – Claudio Bravo, footballer
- 2 May – Mon Laferte, singer
- 6 May – Albert Acevedo, footballer
- 14 May – Luis Pedro Figueroa, footballer
- 18 May – Luis Marín Barahona, footballer
- 23 May – Ignacia Baeza, actress
- 28 May – Marco Estrada, footballer
- 18 June – Christian Martínez Muñoz, footballer
- 23 June – José Rojas, footballer
- 24 June – Belén Montilla, beauty queen
- 30 June – Fernando Godoy, actor
- 4 July – Miguel Pinto, footballer
- 6 August – Loreto Aravena, actress
- 6 August – Carlos Herrera Contreras, footballer
- 9 August – Felipe Díaz, footballer
- 7 September – Cornejo Rodolfo, handball player
- 19 October – Jorge Valdivia, footballer
- 14 November – José Luis Cabión, footballer
- 8 December – Gabriel Vargas, footballer

== Deaths ==
- 20 February – Tomás Ojeda (born 1910)
- 26 June – Luis Álamos (born 1923)
