= 1987 in Chile =

- Decades: 1960s; 1970s; 1980s; 1990s; 2000s
- See also: Other events of 1987; Timeline of Chilean history

The following lists events that happened during 1987 in Chile.

== Incumbents ==
- Dictator: Augusto Pinochet

== Events ==
=== October ===
- 10–25 October – 1987 FIFA World Youth Championship

== Births ==
- 23 February – Hugo Díaz (footballer, born 1987)
- 30 May – Rodrigo Paillaqueo
- 19 June - Oliver Elliot
- 29 June – Jena Lee
- 24 July – José Luis Muñoz
- 1 August – Diego Paulsen
- 3 August – Daniel Zamudio
- 17 September - Oliver Toledo
- 5 November – Alejandro Fuentes

== Deaths ==
- 27 July – Hernán Olguín
