= 1982 in Chile =

- Decades: 1960s; 1970s; 1980s; 1990s; 2000s
- See also: Other events of 1982; Timeline of Chilean history

The following lists events that happened during 1982 in Chile.

== Incumbents ==
- President of Chile: Augusto Pinochet

== Events ==
- 1982 – Crisis of 1982

=== January ===
- 22 January – Death of Eduardo Frei Montalva
- 22–23 January – The Law on Mining Concessions is rectified.

=== February ===
- 25 February - Union leader Tucapel Jimenez is kidnapped and killed by security agents.

=== March ===
- 1 March - The Carretera Austral begins to work, which connects the city of Puerto Montt with the town of Villa O'Higgins.
- 8 March - The Viña del Mar psychopaths, Jorge Sagredo Pizarro and Carlos Alfredo Topp Collins, who were agents attached to the 1st Police Station of Viña del Mar de Carabineros, are handed over to justice.

=== April ===
- 2 April - The Parque Arauco S.A., located in Las Condes, is inaugurated.
- 15 April - Banco de Talca, intervened in November 1981, is liquidated and sold to the Spanish bank Banco Central, which renames it Centrobanco.
- 21 April - The National Institute of Statistics carries out the XV National Census of Population and IV of Housing.
- 22 April - Change of ministerial cabinet. In the Interior portfolio, Sergio Fernández leaves and Enrique Montero Marx arrives; In the Treasury, Sergio de la Cuadra replaces Sergio de Castro; and in Economics, Luis Danús replaces Rolando Ramos.
- 30 April - The Government intervenes the Austral de Chile and Fomento del Bío-Bío banks.

=== June ===
- 14 June - The Government devalues the peso, ending the stable exchange rate of the dollar at 39 pesos, passing the dollar to the price of 76 pesos, inflation goes to 0.4%.
- 27 June - The strong storms that began on June 24 cause the overflow of the Mapocho River, one of the biggest disasters in the city, as well as other more serious disasters in the south of the country.

=== July ===
- 1 July - Inflation in Chile reaches 5.7%

=== August ===
- 1 August - Inflation in Chile reaches 7.8%
- 7 August - Universidad Católica de Chile Televisión carries out a special program on the occasion of the 20th anniversary of Sábados Gigantes.
- 25 August - Rolf Lüders replaces Sergio de la Cuadra and Luis Danús, becoming bi-minister of Finance and Economy.

=== September ===
- 1 September - Inflation in Chile reaches 11.4%

=== October ===
- 1 October - Inflation in Chile reaches 16.3%

=== November ===
- 7 November - El Diario Austral de Osorno is founded.
- 28 November - El Diario Austral de Valdivia is founded.

=== December ===
- 1 December - Inflation in Chile reaches 20.7%
- 3 December - Union leaders Manuel Bustos, Héctor Cuevas and Carlos Podlech are expelled from the country. In addition, Augusto Pinochet orders massive raids in the towns of La Florida and La Cisterna under the pretext of "cleaning up."
- 9 December - Aeronor Flight 304 tragedy. A Fairchild plane crashes to the ground near La Florida Airport, in La Serena. All 46 occupants of the aircraft died.
- 10–11 December – 1982 Chilean telethon

== Births ==
- 1 January – Sebastián Pardo
- 12 February – Juan José Albornoz
- 19 February – Stefan Kramer
- 23 March – José Contreras Arrau
- 17 July – Patricio Valladares
- 2 September – Hugo Droguett
- 4 December – Waldo Ponce

== Deaths ==
- 27 March – Fernando Alessandri (b. 1897)
- 7 June – Carlos Vidal (b. 1902)
- 27 July – Moisés Mussa, essayist, philosopher and educator (b. 1900)
