= 1986 in Chile =

- Decades: 1960s; 1970s; 1980s; 1990s; 2000s
- See also: Other events of 1986; Timeline of Chilean history

The following lists events that happened during 1986 in Chile.

== Incumbents ==
- President of Chile: Augusto Pinochet

== Events ==
=== February ===
- 17 February – Queronque rail accident

=== November ===
- 28 November-8 December – 1986 South American Games

== Births ==
- 13 January – Francisco Ibáñez Campos
- 5 February – Sebastián Pinto
- 11 February – Gabriel Boric
- 14 May – Gonzalo Novoa
- 15 May – David Allende
- 15 May – Matías Fernández
- 1 July – Leonardo Espinoza
- 29 July – Guillermo Orellana
- 4 September – Carlos Andrés Arias

== Deaths ==
- 31 August – Jorge Alessandri (b. 1896)
