= 1974 in Chile =

- Decades: 1950s; 1960s; 1970s; 1980s; 1990s
- See also: Other events of 1974; Timeline of Chilean history

Events in the year 1974 in Chile.

== Incumbents ==
- President: Augusto Pinochet (first as President of the Government Junta, from 27 June, as Supreme Chief of the Nation, from 16 December, as President of the Republic)
- Commander-in-chief of the Chilean Army: Augusto Pinochet
- Military Government Junta of the Republic (de facto Legislative Power and until 16 December, also Executive Power): Augusto Pinochet (for the Army), José Toribio Merino (for the Navy), Gustavo Leigh (for the Air Force) and César Mendoza (for the Police Force)

== January ==
- January 2 - A strong earthquake affected the Province of El Loa. The movement originated at 07:44 hrs. and had a magnitude of 6.8º Richter. The epicenter was recorded in the Salar de Ascotán sector.

== February ==
- February 3 - The XV International Song Festival of Viña del Mar is held. Hosted by César Antonio Santis and Gabriela Velasco.

== March ==
- March 1: Chile re-established diplomatic relations with the Republic of Vietnam (South Vietnam).
- March 11 - The Government Junta issues its "Declaration of Principles"
- March 16 - Augusto Pinochet travels to Brazil to witness the assumption of command by retired general Ernesto Geisel.

== April ==
- April 27 - Carabineros de Chile becomes part of the Ministry of National Defense.

== June ==
- June 15 - Decree Law 512 formally establishes the Dirección de Inteligencia Nacional (DINA).
- June 20 - Through Decree Law 527, Augusto Pinochet becomes "Supreme Chief of the Nation".

== July ==
- July 21 - A group of unknown individuals shoots in Beirut the Chilean ambassador to Lebanon, Alfredo Canales Márquez.

== August ==
- August 9 – VLCC Metula oil spill
- August 18 - The 1974 Oran Earthquake can be felt in the cities of Calama and Antofagasta, stopping the operation of the Chuquicamata mine.

== October ==
- October 3 - An earthquake shakes the Tarapacá Region (Arica and Parinacota Region), with an intensity of 4.5 Richter Scale. This is due to the earthquake that occurred in Lima, Peru.
- October 16 - The Colegio de Profesores de Chile is created, replacing the Single Union of Education Workers, which functioned between 1970 and 1973.
- October 26 - Decree Law No. 527, which established the Statute of the Governing Board, separating the exercise of constituent and legislative powers from the executive branch, is published in the Official Gazette. The first two were established in the Governing Board and the executive would be exercised by the President of the Governing Board, who would be the Supreme Chief of the Nation.

== December ==
• December 16 - By a modification issued to the Decree Law Number 527 (Decree Law Number 806), Augusto Pinochet is formally nominated as President of the Republic by the Military Government Junta.

== Births ==
- date unknown – Patricia Pérez Goldberg
- January 2 – Rossana Dinamarca
- January 12 – Claudia Conserva
- February 27 – Carolina Fadic (d. 2002)
- March 3 – Álvaro Espinoza
- March 10 – Cristián de la Fuente
- April 8 – Luis Fernando Sepúlveda
- April 13 – Moisés Ávila
- May 7 – Ricardo Francisco Rojas
- May 26 – Enrique Osses
- June 17 – Javiera Contador
- June 18 – Sigrid Alegría
- June 26 – Pablo Galdames
- July 22 – Francisco Rojas Rojas
- September 14 – Marlen Olivari
- November 26 – José Miguel Viñuela
- November 28 – Ena von Baer
- December 24 – Marcelo Salas

== Deaths ==
- March 12 – Alberto Bachelet, Chilean Air Force Brigadier General (born 1923)
- March 15 – José Tohá, former Minister of the Interior (b. 1927)
- September 18 – Flora Sanhueza, anarchist activist (born 1911)
- September 30 – Carlos Prats, former Minister of National Defense, car bomb in Buenos Aires, Argentina (b. 1915)
- October 5 – Miguel Enríquez (politician), shot (b. 1944)
