= 1976 in Chile =

- Decades: 1950s; 1960s; 1970s; 1980s; 1990s
- See also: Other events of 1976; Timeline of Chilean history

The following lists events that happened during 1976 in Chile.

== Incumbents ==
- President of Chile: Augusto Pinochet

== Events ==
=== January ===
- January 5 - The Archbishop of Santiago, Raúl Silva Henríquez, creates the Vicariate of Solidarity.
- January 25 - Operation Tucán begins, in which the aim was to organize a group of sympathetic Human Rights activists, and to incite the United Nations to generate negative press against the military government of General Augusto Pinochet.

=== February ===
- February 8 - The newspaper La Estrella de Arica is founded.
- February 9 - The XVII International Song Festival of Viña del Mar is held. Hosted by Antonio Vodanovic, his debut, and Ana María Thieman.
- February 18 - United States suspends military aid to Chile.

=== March ===
- March 25 - San Pablo Hospital is inaugurated in the city of Coquimbo.
- March 30 - Polla Gol officially begins, a game of chance by Polla Chilena de Beneficencia that is based on guessing the results of the week's soccer matches.

=== June ===
- June 4 - The VI Assembly of the Organization of American States begins, held in the Diego Portales Building in Santiago. All OAS member countries are presented with the exception of Mexico. The meeting lasted for 10 days.

=== July ===
- July 12 - It snows over part of the country, between the Santiago Metropolitan Region and the Araucanía Region.
- July 30 - Apsi magazine begins to circulate, opposing the Military Government.

=== August ===
- August 6 - The Ministry of the Interior expels from the country the Christian Democrat lawyers and political leaders Jaime Castillo Velasco and the radical Eugenio Velasco Letelier.

=== September ===
- The Social Democratic Labor Movement is constituted.
- September 12 - On a beach in Los Molles (Valparaíso Region) the body of the communist teacher Marta Ugarte, arrested on August 9, 1976, is found.
- 21 September – Letelier assassination

=== October ===
- October 14 - The first issue of Cosas magazine appears with the French singer Sylvie Vartan on its cover.
- October 19 - The first Santa Isabel supermarket is inaugurated in Valparaíso.
- October 30 - Chile leaves the Andean Pact, due to differences regarding foreign investments.

=== November ===
- November 18 - The broadcasts of the informative El Diario de Cooperativa begin through Radio Cooperativa.

=== December ===
- December 15 - Luis Werner discovers the archaeological site of Monte Verde.
- December 18 - The exchange of political prisoners Luis Corvalán and Vladímir Bukovski reestablish diplomatic relations between Chile and the Soviet Union.
- December 28 - Augusto Pinochet appoints Sergio de Castro as the new Minister of Finance, who will replace Jorge Cauas.

== Births ==
- 4 February – Carlos Toro
- 12 February – Moisés Villarroel
- 2 March – Mario Núñez
- 9 March – Mauricio Aros
- 19 March – Cristóbal Cobo
- 31 May – Tonka Tomicic
- 27 July – Soledad Onetto
- 1 September – Sebastián Rozental
- 24 September – Alejandro Osorio
- 31 December – Patricio Galaz

== Deaths ==
- 16 July – Carmelo Soria (b. 1921)
- 12 August – Carlos Frödden (b. 1887)
- 21 September – Orlando Letelier (b. 1932)
- 28 November – Humberto Elgueta (b. 1904)
