= Novoa =

Novoa or Nóvoa is a Galician surname that later became widespread in the Spanish-speaking world. It is a toponymic surname referring to the former juridical district of Terra de Nóvoa, in the Ourense province, Galicia. The Spanish variation of the surname is Noboa.

People with the surname include:

- Andre Novoa (born 1985), Portuguese game designer
- António Sampaio da Nóvoa (born 1954), Portuguese psychologist
- Carlos Álvarez-Nóvoa (1940–2015), Spanish theatre director, writer, actor and lecturer
- Carmen Novoa (born 1941), artist, painter, writer and poet from Uruguay
- Christian Novoa (born 1991), Venezuelan football forward
- Enio Novoa (born 1986), Peruvian football midfielder
- Felipe Novoa (born 1984), Chilean judoka
- Fernando de Casas Novoa, 18th-century Spanish architect
- Fidel Antonio Novoa Fuentes (born 1900), Salvadoran politician, physician and surgeon
- Fidel Antonio Novoa Meléndez (born 1863), Salvadoran politician, physician and surgeon
- Gonzalo Nin Novoa, Uruguayan administrator
- Gonzalo Novoa (born 1986), Chilean football midfielder
- Gonzalo Núñez de Novoa (died 1332), Spanish Roman Catholic bishop
- Joann Novoa Mossberger (born 1961), Mexican politician
- Joaquín Novoa (born 1983), Spanish cyclist
- Jonathan Novoa (born 1981), Chilean footballer
- José Novoa (born 1955), Spanish handball player
- Joseph Novoa, Venezuelan-Uruguayan film director
- Juan Camilo Novoa (born 1981), Colombian boxer
- Laura Novoa (born 1969), Argentine actress
- Manny Fontenla-Novoa (born 1954), Spanish-British businessman
- Matías Novoa, Chilean actor and model
- Novoa (Spanish footballer) (José Manuel Díaz Novoa; 1944–2026), Spanish football player and manager
- Oscar Novoa (1886–?), Chilean fencer
- Oswaldo Novoa (born 1982), Mexican boxer
- Xosé Ramón Nóvoa Rodríguez (born 1957), Galician scientist
- Rafael Novoa (actor) (born 1971), Colombian actor and model
- Rafael Novoa (baseball) (born 1967), American baseball pitcher
- Ricardo Armando Novoa Arciniegas (born 1931), Salvadoran politician, attorney at law and notary
- Roberto Novoa (born 1979), Dominican Republic baseball pitcher
- Rodolfo Nin Novoa (born 1948), Uruguayan politician
- Salvador Novoa (1937–2021), Mexican dramatic tenor
- Sergio Novoa (born 1981), Colombian football midfielder

== Fictional characters ==
- Jax Novoa, a character from Every Witch Way
- Mía Novoa, a character in the television series Grachi
