= 1979 in Chile =

- Decades: 1950s; 1960s; 1970s; 1980s; 1990s
- See also: Other events of 1979; Timeline of Chilean history

The following lists events that happened during 1979 in Chile.

== Incumbents ==
- President of Chile: Augusto Pinochet

== Events ==
=== January ===
- 9 January – The 1979 Treaty of Montevideo is signed.

=== February ===
- February 3 - The XX International Song Festival of Viña del Mar is held, conducted by Antonio Vodanovic and María Graciela Gómez.

=== April ===
- April 18 - Relatives of disappeared detainees are chained in the building of the former National Congress, where the Ministry of Justice worked. Again they get no response.

=== May ===
- May 3 - The newspaper La Estrella del Loa is founded, edited in Calama.
- May 5 - The Cobresal soccer team of El Salvador is founded.

=== June ===
- June 3 - The minor Rodrigo Anfruns is kidnapped. The fact causes great commotion in the country. His body appears eleven days later, sowing doubt about the culprits.
- June 5 - The Center-Left Social Democratic Movement between 1979 and 1985 is founded.
- June 29 - Finance Minister Sergio de Castro announces that the exchange rate of the peso against the dollar will be fixed, establishing it at 39 pesos.

=== July ===
- July 1 - The first personal stereo arrives in Chile.

=== August ===
- August 22 - The Fausto nightclub opens its doors, the first venue of its kind for the LGBT public in Chile.

=== September ===
- September 18 - General Augusto Pinochet signs the decree declaring the cueca "national dance of Chile".

=== October ===
- October 23 - Coihuín tragedy: intense rains cause the collapse of a hill in the coastal town of Coihuín, in the commune of Puerto Montt, crushing ten people, all algae collectors.
- October 26 - Decree Laws 2867 and 2868 are published in the Official Gazette, redrawing provincial and communal boundaries throughout Chile. New communes are created such as Ollagüe in the province of El Loa, Antofagasta Region, and Hualaihué in the Los Lagos Region.

=== November ===
- November 13 - The Vicaría de la Solidaridad denounces the burial of nearly 3,000 corpses in Patio 29 of the General Cemetery of Santiago, corresponding mostly to disappeared detainees.
- November 29 - The latest edition of El Tarapacá de Iquique circulates.
- 30 November-1 December – 1979 Chilean telethon

== Births ==
- 12 February – Patricio Ormazábal
- 27 July – Rodolfo Moya
- 30 July – Roberto Bruce (d. 2011)
- 9 August – Matías Bize
- 25 August – Cristián Reynero
- 11 September – David Pizarro
- 12 September – Denisse van Lamoen
- 6 October – Gonzalo Miranda
- 10 October – Nicolás Massú
- 14 October – Rodrigo Tello

== Deaths ==
- 21 July – Juan Guzmán Cruchaga (b. 1895)
