= 1975 in Chile =

- Decades: 1950s; 1960s; 1970s; 1980s; 1990s
- See also: Other events of 1975; Timeline of Chilean history

The following lists events that happened during 1975 in Chile.

== Incumbents ==
- President of Chile: Augusto Pinochet

== Events ==
=== January ===
- January 11 - Clodomiro Almeyda, Jorge Tapia and three other personalities from the government of former Chilean president Salvador Allende, are released and expelled to Romania.

=== February ===
- February 4 - The XVI International Song Festival of Viña del Mar is held. Hosted by César Antonio Santis, Juan La Rivera, Gabriel Muñoz, Nelson Hoffman and Rubén del Castillo, one per night.
- February 8 - The generals of Bolivia and Chile, Hugo Banzer and Augusto Pinochet respectively, sign the Charaña Accords in the highland country, which restores diplomatic relations between both countries.
- February 20 – Operation Colombo

=== March ===
- March 13 - Coquimbo earthquake. An earthquake measuring 6.9 on the Richter scale shakes the cities of La Serena, Coquimbo and Vicuña, leaving three dead and 18 injured.

=== April ===
- April 1 - The Minimum Employment Program (PEM) begins.

=== May ===
May 15 - The first trip of the Santiago Metro is made on Line 1 of the Santiago Metro

=== July ===
- July 24 - In the framework of Operation Colombo, the newspaper La Segunda headlined on its front page "exterminated like mice", falsely stating that 59 Miristas had died in combat abroad, when in fact they had been assassinated by the Military Regime of Augusto Pinochet such a situation occurred due to the false information given by the Brazilian magazines O Dia de Curitiba and the Lea magazine of Buenos Aires about supposed confrontations and purges of the MIR abroad.

=== August ===
- August 4 - According to Decree Law 1123, the official currency of the country becomes again the Chilean Peso, with the equivalence $ 1 (peso) = Eº 1000 (escudos).
- August 20 - El Diario de Aysén is founded, edited in the city of Coyhaique.
- August 31 - The latest edition of the newspaper La Patria circulates.

=== September ===
- September 8 - The newspaper El Cronista, successor to La Nación and La Patria, is founded.
- September 11 - On the 2nd Anniversary of the Coup d'etat Augusto Pinochet lights the "Flame of Freedom" in Bulnes Square. Said monument was extinguished and removed from the site during the government of Ricardo Lagos.
- September 15 - : The first section of Line 1 of the Santiago Metro is inaugurated. It includes the stations from San Pablo to La Moneda.
- September 24 - The Nahueltoro bridge, which connected La Rivera (San Carlos) and Nahueltoro (Coihueco), falls, resulting in 28 deaths and 94 injuries. 3 people died during the transfer to the hospital or upon arrival at the care center.

=== October ===
- 6 October – Leighton case

=== November ===
- November 8 - The National Tourism Service is created, in order to control, coordinate, promote, investigate, plan and promote tourism activity, replacing the Tourism Directorate.
- November 19 - The DINA executes three members of the Gallardo family at the La Rinconada farm in Maipú, together with militants of the Communist Party of Chile Pedro Cortés Jelves and the MIR Manuel Lautaro Reyes and Luis Andres Ganga. The event is known as the Rinconada de Maipú montage and journalists from TVN participated in it and it is still being investigated by the justice system.
- November 22 - General Augusto Pinochet travels to Spain to attend the funeral of the head of state of that country, Francisco Franco.

== Births ==
- 8 February – Clarence Acuña
- 15 March – Marco Villaseca
- 2 April – Pedro Pascal
- 21 April – Martín Cárcamo
- 25 May – Raúl Muñoz
- 2 June – Paz Bascuñán
- 1 July – Íngrid Cruz
- 19 July – Néstor Cantillana
- 21 July – DJ Méndez
- 8 August – Christián Yantani
- 2 September – Fernando Martel
- 15 September – Francisco López Contardo
- 16 October – Claudio Núñez
- 30 October – Marco Antonio Arriagada Quinchel
- 27 November – Rodrigo Valenzuela
- 26 December – Marcelo Ríos

== Deaths ==
- 30 August – Roberto Cortés (Chilean footballer) (b. 1905)
