= 1984 in Chile =

- Decades: 1960s; 1970s; 1980s; 1990s; 2000s
- See also: Other events of 1984; Timeline of Chilean history

The following lists events that happened during 1984 in Chile.

== Incumbents ==
- President of Chile: Augusto Pinochet

== Events ==
=== November ===
- 29 November – The Treaty of Peace and Friendship of 1984 between Chile and Argentina is signed.

== Births ==
- 2 February – Johan Fuentes
- 4 February – Mauricio Pinilla
- 9 May – Renata Ruiz
- 23 May – Washington Torres
- 1 June – Jean Beausejour
- 12 June – Felipe Barrientos
- 17 June – Luis Jiménez
- 10 July – Mark González
- 2 August – Paulo Garcés
- 10 August – Osvaldo González
- 14 September – Emilio Hernández
- 10 October – Roberto Cereceda
- 16 October – Nicolás Jofre

== Deaths ==
- 24 January – Hernán Díaz Arrieta (b. 1891)
