= 1980 in Chile =

- Decades: 1960s; 1970s; 1980s; 1990s; 2000s
- See also: Other events of 1980; Timeline of Chilean history

The following lists events that happened during 1980 in Chile.

== Incumbents ==
- President of Chile: Augusto Pinochet

== Events ==
=== January ===
- January 2–18 – High temperatures hit the entire country, from Arica to Punta Arenas. Temperatures were highest between Greater Valparaíso and Greater Concepción.

=== February ===
- February 6–11 – The XXI Viña del Mar International Song Festival was held, hosted by Antonio Vodanovic and María Olga Fernández.

=== March ===
- March 14 – The Ovens of Lonquén are dynamited.
- March 22 – The dictator of the Philippines, Ferdinand Marcos, cancels Augusto Pinochet's visit to that country mid-flight, which was the first stop on an Asian tour that would also take him to Easter Island, Tahiti, Fiji, and Hong Kong. The Chilean presidential plane must land in Fiji before returning to Chile.
- March 30 – Members of the Revolutionary Left Movement (MIR) stole from the Chilean National History Museum the flag of the swearing-in of Chile's independence, dating from 1818. This item was returned to the museum in December 2003.

=== April ===
- April 1 – The Santiago Cable Car is inaugurated, located on San Cristóbal Hill.
- April 13 – The Mundomágico amusement park is inaugurated, located in the commune of Lo Prado. The park later came to have a television program.

=== June ===
- June 3 – The newspaper La Nación circulates again. The newspaper had been suspended since September 11, 1973, and in the meantime it was replaced by the newspapers La Patria and El Cronista.

=== July ===
- July 15 – The director of the Army Intelligence School, Lieutenant Colonel Roger Vergara Campos, is shot in his car. In addition, his driver, Second Sergeant Mario Espinoza, was seriously injured. The perpetrators of the crime are members of the MIR.
- July 23 – The Caupolicán Tower is inaugurated, the tallest in Gran Temuco. In 2006, it was surpassed by the Torre Campanario.

=== August ===
- August 5 – The Viña del Mar psychopaths assassinate Enrique Gajardo, electronic technician and teacher on the Camino El Olivar in Viña del Mar.
- August 10 – In a speech to the country, Augusto Pinochet announces that on September 11 the plebiscite will be held to approve or reject the new Political Constitution of the Republic of Chile.
- August 12 – The Latin American Integration Association (ALADI) is created, of which Chile is a founding member.
- August 22 – The extension of Line 1 of the Santiago Metro is inaugurated, along with the corresponding stations between Salvador and Escuela Militar.
- August 27 – The Caupolicanazo is held, the first massive demonstration against the military government, led by former president Eduardo Frei Montalva.

=== September ===
- September 11 – The 1980 Chilean constitutional referendum is held.

=== October ===
- October 10 – The President of Brazil, João Figueiredo, visits Chile, being received by Augusto Pinochet.

=== November ===
- November 4 – A new private pension system (AFP) is created.
- November 11 – The Viña del Mar psychopaths assassinate Alfredo Sánchez Muñoz, a gynecologist, and rape Luisa Fernanda Bohle, a nurse, near the Estadio Sausalito in Viña del Mar.
- November 26 – Mall Paseo Estación, located in Estación Central, is inaugurated. It is located adjacent to the Central Railway Station.

=== December ===
- December 5–6 – 1980 Chilean telethon
- December 12 – During a meeting in the Vatican City, Pope John Paul II announces to the representatives of Chile and Argentina his proposed resolution of the Beagle Conflict.

== Births ==
- 1 March – Carlos Galdames
- 14 May – Rodolfo Madrid
- 20 June – Milovan Mirosevic
- 29 July – Fernando González
- 1 August – Esteban Paredes
- 16 August – Elita Löfblad
- 28 November – Gabriela Barros

== Deaths ==
- 22 August – Gabriel González Videla (d. 1980)
