= Biblioteca Vasconcelos =

Library in Mexico City, Mexico

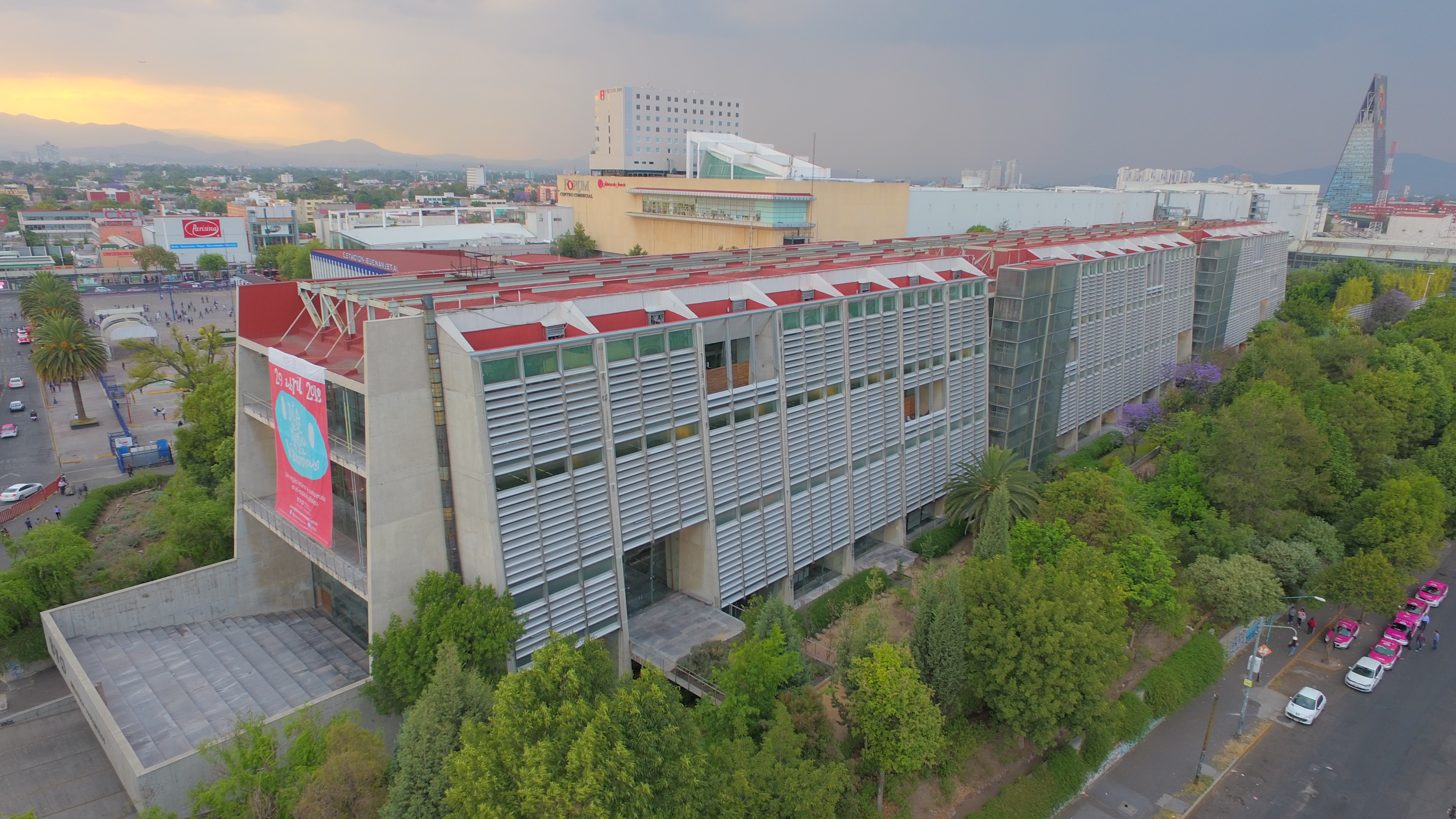
- Aerial view of the Vasconcelos Library
- 19°26′51″N 99°09′03″W
- Location: Buenavista, Cuauhtémoc, Mexico City, Mexico
- Type: Public library
- Established: 16 May 2006 (20 years ago)

Collection
- Items collected: Books, journals, newspapers, magazines, audio recordings, movies, Braille books
- Size: 600,000 books

Access and use
- Population served: 1.06 million (2010)

Other information
- Website: bibliotecavasconcelos.gob.mx

Biblioteca Vasconcelos, also known as the Megabiblioteca by the press, is a library in the Buenavista neighborhood of Mexico City. It is dedicated to José Vasconcelos, the philosopher and former president of the National Library of Mexico. The library is spread across 38,000 square metres (409,000 sq ft), and had an initial planned cost of 954 million pesos (roughly US$98 million). The Congress of Mexico proposed plans to reduce the budget of 2006 that included cuts for all three branches of government, but the National Action Party (PAN) presented an alternate budget that preserved funds for Enciclomedia and the Vasconcelos Library.

The library is located in the Cuauhtémoc borough, adjacent to the Buenavista railway station, where the Metro, suburban train, and Metrobús meet. It is adorned by several sculptures by Mexican artists, including Gabriel Orozco's Ballena (Whale), prominently located at the centre of the building.

== History ==
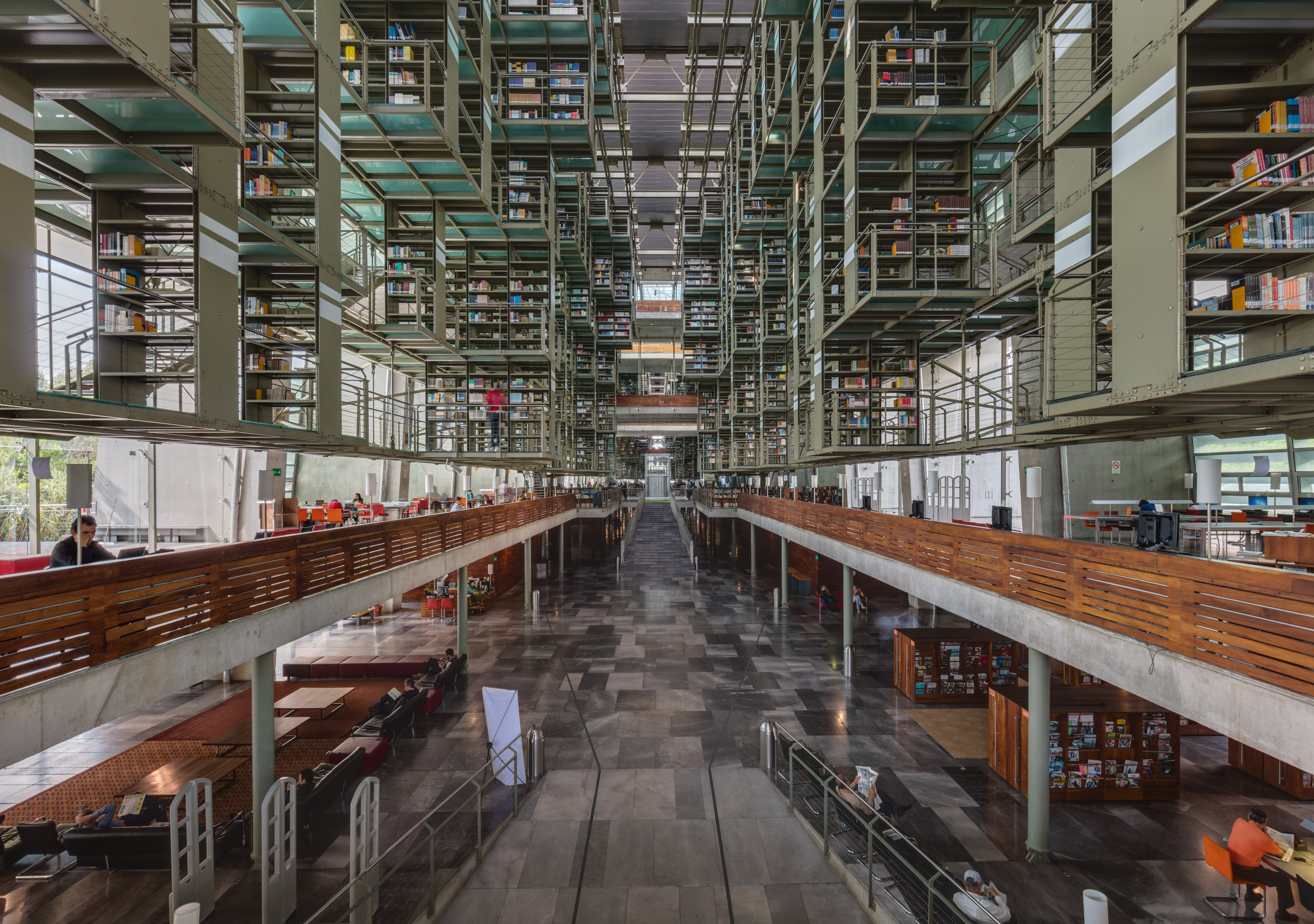
Interior, photo taken during Wikimania 2015

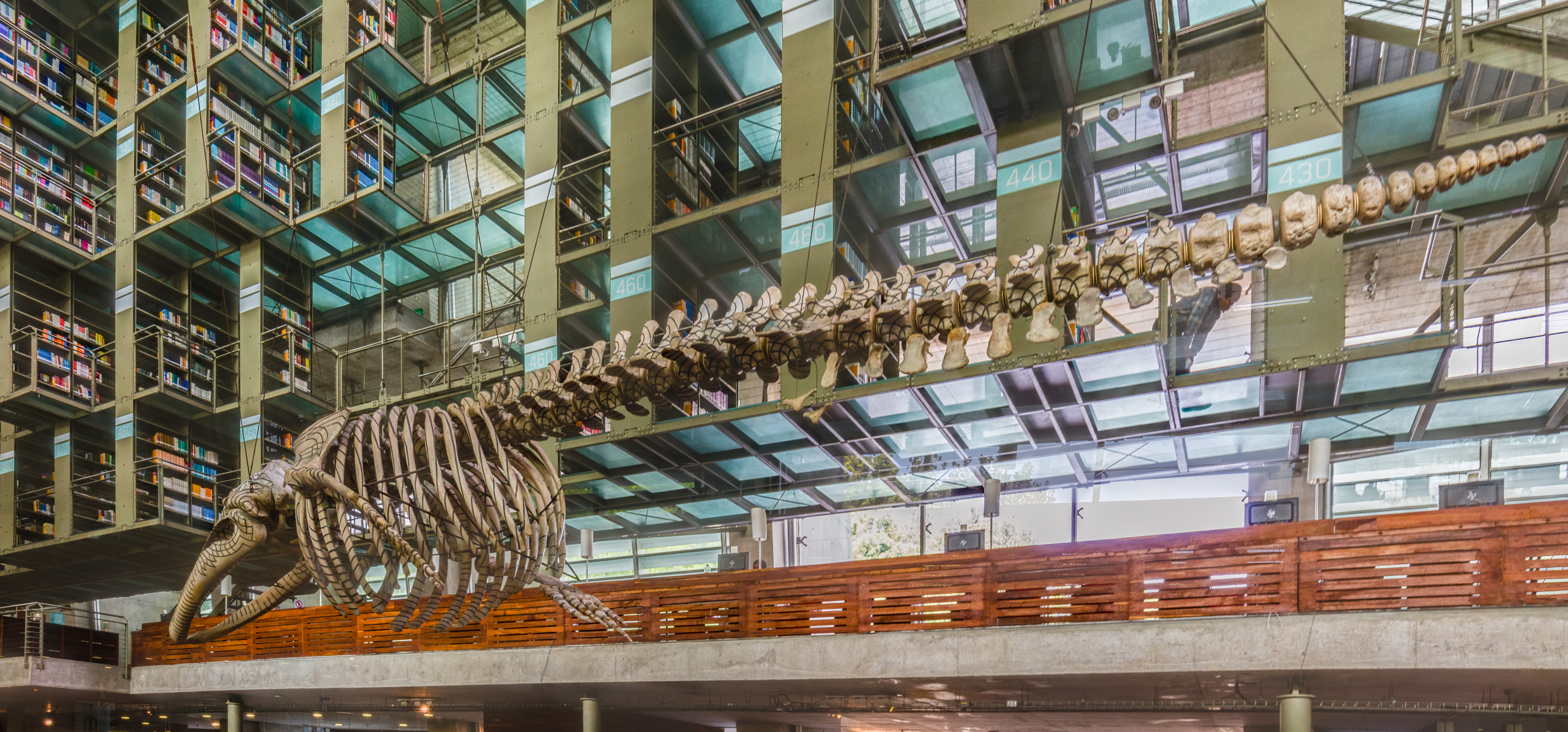
Gabriel Orozco's Ballena (Whale)

Then-President of Mexico Vicente Fox inaugurated the library on 16 May 2006, and stated that this was one of the most advanced constructions of the 21st century, and that it would be spoken of throughout the world. This inauguration took place a week before the deadline the president had to promote his accomplishments before the 2006 presidential election.

The library had to close in March 2007 due to construction defects. The Superior Auditor of the Federation detected 36 construction irregularities and issued 13 motions of responsibility for public servants of the federal government. Among the irregularities found was the misplacement of marble blocks at a cost of 15 million pesos (roughly 1.4 million dollars).

During Calderón's administration, efforts to restore it continued with a further investment of 32 million pesos (roughly US$3 million).

It was reopened to the public in November 2008 after 22 months.

== Architecture ==
The winning proposal for the library was designed by the Mexican architects Alberto Kalach and Juan Palomar. Lily Carr, writing in 2021 noted, "the structure's cavernous, hollowed-out interior of an ossified matrix of suspended, expandable shelves presents the project as an awe-inspiring, chill-inducing spectacular that immerses the first-time visitor in the architects' vision of a library as a container, or 'ark', a carrier of human knowledge."

The library architecture allegedly inspired the 'tesseract' scene of the film Interstellar (2014) although this has never been confirmed and may just be coincidental.

== See also ==
- List of libraries in Mexico
