= Rubén Castillo =

Rubén Castillo may refer to:

- Rubén Castillo (footballer) (born 1985), Chilean footballer
- Rubén Castillo (judge) (born 1954), American judge
- Rubén Castillo Anchapuri (1931–2009), Peruvian theologist and biologist
- Ruben Castillo (boxer) (1957–2026), American boxer
