= Carlos Herrera (disambiguation) =

Carlos Herrera (1856–1930) was a Guatemalan politician who was acting president between 1920 and 1921.

Carlos Herrera may also refer to:

- Carlos Herrera (boxer) (born 1983), Argentine boxer
- Carlos Herrera (journalist) (born 1957), Spanish journalist
- Carlos Herrera (footballer, born 1997), Mexican footballer
- Carlos Herrera Araluce (1936–2016), Mexican politician
- Carlos Herrera (footballer, born 1983), Chilean footballer
- Carlos María Herrera (1875–1914), Uruguayan painter

== See also ==
- Carl Herrera (born 1966), Venezuelan basketball player
- Carlos (footballer, born 1948), Spanish footballer, full name Carlos Ruiz Herrero
