= Leonardo Espinoza =

Leonardo Espinoza may refer to:

- Leonardo Espinoza (footballer, born 1986), Chilean football forward for Palestino, Ñublense, Colchagua and O'Higgins
- Leonardo Espinoza (footballer, born 1992), Chilean football and indoor soccer forward for Santiago Morning, Deportes Ovalle, Deportes Iquique, Deportes Temuco, Rangers, Los Angeles Force, and Deportes Santa Cruz
