= 1978 in Chile =

- Decades: 1950s; 1960s; 1970s; 1980s; 1990s
- See also: Other events of 1978; Timeline of Chilean history

The following lists events that happened during 1978 in Chile.

== Incumbents ==
- President of Chile: Augusto Pinochet

== Events ==
=== January ===
- 4 January – Chilean national consultation, 1978
- January 17 - The San Juan Earthquake is felt in the cities of Chañaral, Copiapó, Vallenar, La Serena and Coquimbo.
- January 19-Augusto Pinochet visits Mendoza, where he meets with the Head of State of Argentina, Jorge Rafael Videla, to attempt a peaceful solution to the conflict of beagle channel.
- January 26 - The amusement park Fantasilandia, the largest in Santiago, is inaugurated.

=== February ===
- February 2 - The XIX International Song Festival of Viña del Mar is held, its conductors were Antonio Vodanovic and María Graciela Gómez.
- February 3 - The American firm Goodyear acquires the National Tire Industry (INSA) for 45 million dollars.

=== March ===
- March 10 - The Undersecretary of the Interior, Enrique Montero Marx, announces the end of the state of siege, and replaces it with the state of emergency.
- March 17 - The president of Bolivia, Hugo Banzer, breaks off diplomatic relations with Chile after the negotiations between the two countries about Bolivia's landlocked status fail.
- March 31 - Line 2 of the Santiago Metro is inaugurated, which included the stations between Los Héroes and Franklin.

=== April ===
- April 11 - Color television is introduced, Chile adopts the US standard NTSC-M and channels 13, 9, UCV and TVN begin broadcasting in full color.
- April 15 - Sergio Fernández Fernández is appointed Minister of the Interior to replace Raúl Benavides, who will take over the Defense portfolio.
- April 19 - The Government publishes the text of the Amnesty Law, which frees from their responsibilities those guilty of crimes committed between September 11, 1973 and March 10, 1978.

=== May ===
- May 21 - The Iquique Municipal Sports Club is founded in Iquique.
- May 22 - The third hunger strike of the relatives of the disappeared detainees begins in different parishes of the city of Santiago and at the UNICEF headquarters. Through the church, the government promised to investigate this fact, but nothing is fulfilled.

=== June ===
- June 8 - The National Energy Commission is created, whose objective is to take care of all matters related to energy.
- June 19 - The DC leader Bernardo Leighton returns to Chile after his exile in Rome.

=== July ===
- July 18 - The Italian newspaper Corriere della Sera publishes an interview with General Gustavo Leigh. In it he proposes a political itinerary to return to democracy within 5 years.
- July 24 - As a result of the interview delivered to Corriere della Sera, the Military Junta dismisses Gustavo Leigh as Commander-in-Chief of the Chilean Air Force. He is replaced by the then Minister of Health, Fernando Matthei.

=== August ===
- August 1 - The Amanecer Building is inaugurated, the tallest building in Greater Concepción for 30 years, with 77 meters and 22 floors.

=== October ===
- October 12 - The Edmundo Pérez Zujovic Tower is inaugurated, the tallest building in Antofagasta to date, 92 meters high.
- October 17 - The economic newspaper Estrategia is founded, edited in Santiago.
- October 31 - General Augusto Pinochet asks the Council of State to study the draft of the new Political Constitution of the Republic proposed by the study commission led by Enrique Ortúzar, minister of state of the former president Jorge Alessandri

=== November ===
- 12 November - The Huanchaca street scandal occurs, when 7 young homosexuals were detained in a house located at number 352 of said street in the city of Antofagasta.

=== December ===
- December 1 - In Lonquén, the first remains of disappeared detainees are discovered. They were all peasants from Isla de Maipo arrested in 1973.
- December 2 - The OTI Festival is held at the Municipal Theater of Santiago.
- 8–9 December – 1978 Chilean telethon
- December 21 - The extension of Line 2 of the Santiago Metro is inaugurated, which included the stations between Franklin and Lo Ovalle.
- 22 December – Operation Soberanía

== Births ==
- 9 February – Mark Tullo
- 12 March – Joel Estay
- 30 March – Mauricio Rojas Toro
- 9 April – Patricio Acevedo
- 10 May – Reinaldo Navia
- 25 May – Adrián García
- 1 September – Arturo Corvalán
- 11 September – Pablo Contreras
- 17 September – Sergio Valdés
- 19 October – Nicolás Peric
- 21 November – Richard Rodríguez
- 29 November – Benjamín Vicuña
- 24 December – Marianne Berndt

== Deaths ==
- 21 May – Enrique Gebhard (b. 1909)
