= 1985 in Chile =

- Decades: 1960s; 1970s; 1980s; 1990s; 2000s
- See also: Other events of 1985; Timeline of Chilean history

The following lists events that happened during 1985 in Chile.

== Incumbents ==
- President of Chile: Augusto Pinochet

== Events ==
=== March ===
- 13 March – 1985 Algarrobo earthquake
- 30 March – Caso Degollados

=== April ===
- 8 April – 1985 Rapel Lake earthquake

== Births ==
- 8 January – Jorge Aguilar
- 21 January – Jean Philippe Cretton
- 5 February – Guillermo Hormazábal
- 22 February – José Pedro Fuenzalida
- 11 April – Gustavo Zamudio
- 24 April – Rubén Castillo
- 13 June – Bárbara Muñoz

== Deaths ==
- 10 April - Alfredo Duhalde, politician (b. 1898)
- date unknown – Cristián Huneeus, writer (b. 1935)
