= President Noboa =

President Noboa may refer to:

- Daniel Noboa Azin (born 1987), President of Ecuador since 2023
- Diego Noboa y Arteta (1789–1870), President of Ecuador from 1850 to 1851
- Gustavo Noboa (born 1937), President of Ecuador from 2000 to 2003

== See also ==
- Noboa
