= 1977 in Chile =

- Decades: 1950s; 1960s; 1970s; 1980s; 1990s
- See also: Other events of 1977; Timeline of Chilean history

The following lists events that happened during 1977 in Chile.

== Incumbents ==
- President of Chile: Augusto Pinochet

== Events ==
=== January ===
- January 1 - The tax on books begins to govern.
- January 5 - The Government intervenes in Banco Osorno and La Unión.
- January 7 - In Calama the Sports Club Cobreloa is founded.
- January 28 - The Government closes Radio Balmaceda, belonging to the Christian Democracy.

=== February ===
- February 4 - The XVIII International Song Festival of Viña del Mar is held. Conducted by Antonio Vodanovic and María Graciela Gómez.
- February 8 - Two interprovincial buses collide near the city of Calama, resulting in 17 deaths and 20 injuries.

=== March ===
- March 12 - Augusto Pinochet decrees the dissolution of all political parties, with the exception of the National Party of Chile and others from the Right.
- March 30 - Unknown persons set fire to the studios of the radio station La Voz de la Costa in Osorno, belonging to the Catholic Church.
- March 31 - The extension of Line 1 of the Santiago Metro is inaugurated, which includes the section between La Moneda and Salvador stations.

=== April ===
- April 4 - The Ministry of the Interior prohibits the importation of the books by Gabriel García Márquez, Mario Vargas Llosa and Julio Cortázar

=== May ===
- 2 May – Beagle Channel Arbitration

=== June ===
- June 7 - The La Rioja Earthquake is felt in Copiapó, Vallenar, La Serena and Coquimbo.
- June 14 to 23 - Relatives of disappeared detainees carry out a hunger strike at ECLAC headquarters.

=== July ===
- 9 – Acto de Chacarillas

=== August ===
- August 13 - With the publication in the Official Gazette of decree laws 1876 and 1878, the Government dissolves the National Intelligence Directorate (DINA) and replaces it with the National Information Center (CNI)

=== September ===
- September 5 - Invited to participate in the ratification of the Panama Canal agreements, Augusto Pinochet travels to United States, where he meets with President Jimmy Carter and other Latin American leaders.

=== October ===
- October 12 - The cast of El Chavo del 8, commanded by Roberto Gómez Bolaños (better known as Chespirito), visits Santiago and performs a double function at the Estadio Nacional.

=== November ===
- November 3 - Manuel Contreras resigns from the leadership of the CNI. Odlanier Mena assumes his replacement.
- November 20 - Chile establishes diplomatic relations with Suriname. The agreement is signed between the representatives of both countries before the Organization of American States.
- November 23 - A strong tremor is felt due to the Caucete earthquake in the province of San Juan, Argentina. The earthquake is felt in the cities of Antofagasta, Chañaral, Copiapó, Vallenar, La Serena, Coquimbo, Ovalle, Illapel, La Ligua, San Felipe and Los Andes.

=== December ===
- December 1 - Chile's ambassador to the UN, Sergio Diez, denies before the United Nations General Assembly the existence of disappeared detainees and reiterates the Government's version that said disappearances actually corresponded to internal purges of the MIR, which simply they had no legal existence, or that they were dead or exiled people.
- December 6 - The aftershock of the Caucete earthquake is felt in the cities of Copiapó and Vallenar.
- December 12 - Augusto Pinochet announces the holding of a National Consultation, in which the "Yes" option will support the government's management and reject foreign interference.
- December 22 - Former socialist senator Erich Schnake goes into exile in France.
- December 29 to 31 - The second hunger strike of relatives of the disappeared detainees takes place in Santiago, this time in the Church of San Francisco.

== Births ==
- 19 January – Nicole (Chilean singer)
- 23 January – Javier di Gregorio
- 5 February – Rodrigo Núñez
- 20 February – María José Prieto
- 31 May – Hermes Gamonal
- 12 June – Ana Tijoux
- 12 July – David Henríquez
- 30 July – Diana Bolocco
- 7 August – Francisco Arrué
- 30 September – Héctor Tapia
- 3 October – Rodrigo Meléndez
- 12 October – Manuel Neira
- 18 November – Manuel Ibarra
- 24 December – Américo

== Deaths ==
- 9 March – Ulises Poirier (b. 1897)
- 2 September – Felipe Iturriaga (b. 1899)
