= Beatriz Copello =

Australian writer and psychologist

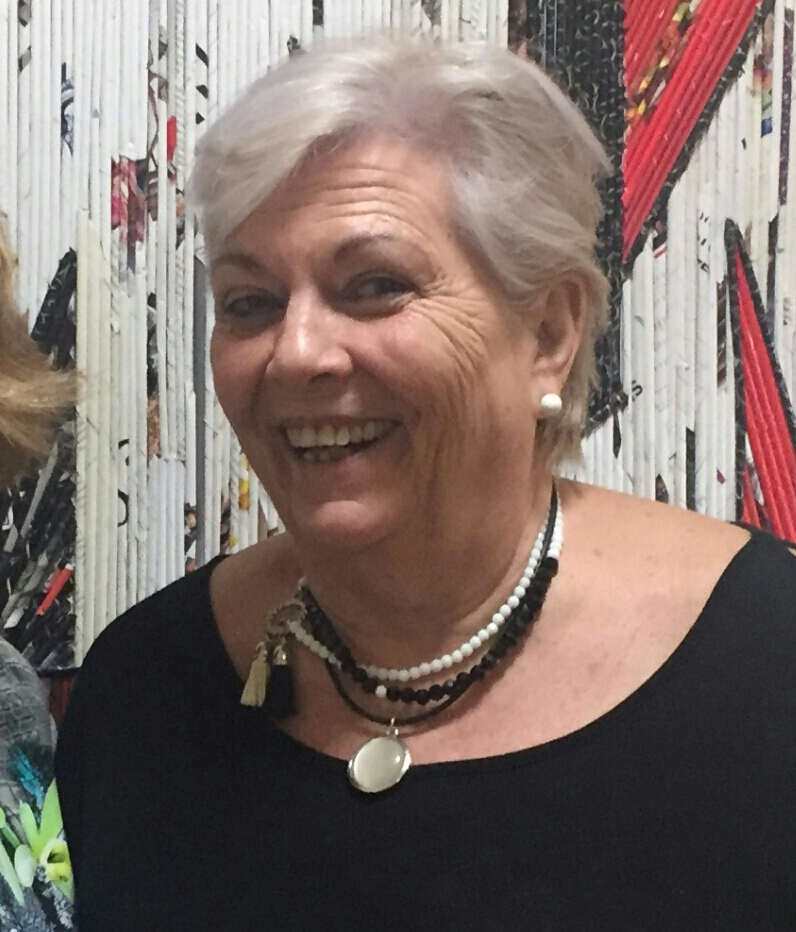
- Copello in 2017
- Born: Argentina
- Education: University of Technology Sydney, Sydney University, University of Wollongong
- Writing career
- Language: English, Spanish
- Notable awards: First Prize at the 2000 Sydney Writers' Festival

Beatriz Copello is an Australian writer, poet, playwright and psychologist. Her fiction and poetry has been published in Australia and overseas, in literary journals such as Southerly and Australian Women's Book Review, and in several anthologies and feminist publications. Her poems have been translated into Italian, Spanish, Polish and Chinese. She is the recipient of several prizes, including a first prize at the 2000 Sydney Writers' Festival. Her book of lesbian poetry Women Souls and Shadows is her best-known work.

== Career ==
Copello was born in Argentina, but emigrated to Australia in the 1970s. She obtained a degree in communications from the University of Technology Sydney in 1989 and an MA in English (Creative Writing) from Sydney University in 1996. In 2003 Copello received a Doctorate of Creative Arts (Creative Writing) from the University of Wollongong.

She received an Emerging Writers Grant for Poetry from the Australia Council Literature Fund in November 1996 and an Ian Reed Foundation Scholarship to study radio drama writing at the Australian Film Television & Radio School in 1998.

Her play Malinche's Fire was performed at Belvoir St Theatre and was selected to be read at the International Women's Playwright Conference in Athens, Greece, in 2000.

Aside from Women Souls and Shadows, she has published three other books of poetry: Meditations at the Edge of a Dream, Under the Gums' Long Shade and Lo Irrevocable del Halcon. As said by Magdalena Ball in her review: "Beatriz Copello’s Under the Gums' Long Shade is a beautifully written, tender collection full of rich moments. It travels along a very national route, exploring the Australian terrain, and then moves outward to a place that encompasses all of humanity."

Copello has been invited to read her poetry in Argentina, Italy, Spain, United States and Indonesia. Her novel A Call to the Stars was translated into Chinese.

Copello co-organized several writers' conferences and has been part of the jury in ten literary competitions. She presented twelve literary papers at various conferences and seminars in Australia and abroad. As an editor, she worked with many authors and edited five anthologies and three books of poetry. One book entitled Evasion/Evasion by Carmen Novoa received praise for Beatriz's translation from Spanish to English in a review from Glenda Guest. She has held 25 writing and publishing workshops since 1993.

She wrote reviews about dozens of authors, from Marques to Gaarder, and articles on festivals, exhibitions, dance and theatre shows.

Her abstract paintings were exhibited in 2014 together with the works of three other Australian women originating from South America.

Copello is the recipient of several prizes, including First Prize in the Sydney Writers' Festival "Tell Your Story" competition in 2000, with a performance poetry piece.

== Awards and mentions ==
- Highly commended for Women, Souls and Shadows at the Xerox Fast Books Award, Wild and Wolley, 1993
- First prize for the short story Scale at Taylor Square Arts Festival in 1995
- Finalist certificate for the short story Hope in the NSW PAVE Literary Competition, 1997
- First prize in the 2000 Sydney Writers Festival Pitching Literary Competition
- Premio Internacional Una Poesia por La Vida/International Competition A Poem For Life, Edizione Universum, Italy, 2003
- Highly commended for the poem Cervantes, Spanish Society, Sydney 2003
- Second prize for the short story La Calma del Regreso, Argentinian Cultural Club, 2012
- First prize for the short story Aritmomania, Literary Group Palabras, 2013

== Works ==
=== Poetry ===
- Women, Souls And Shadows, Bemac Publications, Sydney, 1992
- Meditations At The Edge Of A Dream, Glass House Books, Interactive Publications, Sydney, 2001
- Under the Gums’ Long Shade, Bemac Publications, Sydney, 2008
- Lo Irrevocable del Halcon, Bemac Publications, 2013
- Various authors (2023). Jarquín, Carlos Javier (ed.). Canto planetario: hermandad en la Tierra. Costa Rica: HC Editores. ISBN 979-8850092115.

=== Fiction ===
- Forbidden Steps Under The Wisteria, Abbott Bentley, Pty Ltd., Sydney, June 1999
- A Call To The Stars (translated into Chinese), Crown Publishing Company Ltd, Taiwan, June 1999
- The Book Of Jeremiah, published by Ginninderra Press, Australia, December 2024

=== Short stories ===
- Lesbian Love Lesbian Stories, a short story collection at Amazon Kindle, 2014
- Rainbow of Love, Cyberwit.net, 2023

=== Translations ===
- Evasion/Evasion, by Carmen Novoa and translated Spanish to English by Beatriz Copello, Earlwood : Bemac Publications, 2004 selected work poetry

=== Plays ===
- Malinche's Fire, 1998
