= 1981 Chilean telethon =

Charity event

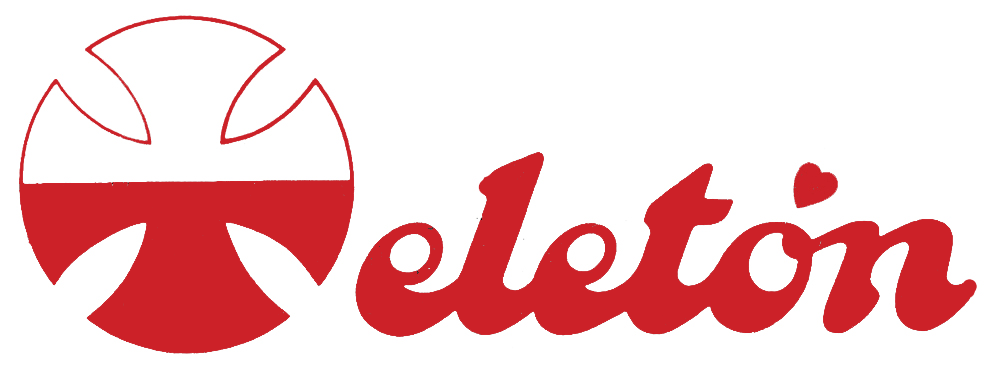
Chilean Telethon's logo

The 1981 Chilean telethon was the fourth version of the solidarity campaign conducted in Chile, which took place on 11 and 12 December 1981. The theme of this version was "Together, Everything is Possible." The poster girl was Ana María Cortés.

For the fourth consecutive year Don Francisco hosted the telethon. This version was characterized by the number of artists who supported this cause. The amount raised was CL$ 202,436,220.

Among the controversies of this telethon, was the donation of an ambulance to that institution by the CNI (National Information Centre). According to the book La Era Ochentera (The Eighties Era), the telethon received a call from the CNI, to donate an ambulance, however Ximena Casarejos was not convinced that the CNI representative would make the donation. Eventually the CNI made the donation at 18:30 hours on 12 December 1981.

Unknown to Chileans, 1981 was also the start of the internationalization of the format that began in 1978, when the first Peruvian edition of Teleton - hosted by Ricardo Belmont, who attended the 1980 edition - aired on Panamericana Television, with the 1980 theme and anthem adapted for Peru.

== Sponsors ==
Aceite Chef; Arroz Los Chinos; Bálsamo Glossy; Banco de Chile; Cecinas La Preferida; Coca-Cola; Cola Cao; Conservas Colorado; Consorcio Nacional de Seguros	Chicles Dos en Uno; Helados Bresler; Insecticidas Baygon; Jean Les Pines; Johnson's Clothes; Jugos Naturales Watt's; Leche Soprole; Mantequilla Sureña; Nescafé	Odontine; Pilsener Cristal; Quesos Dos Álamos; Salsa de Tomates Elak; Supermercados Unimarc; Té Supremo; Vinos Santa Carolina; Zapatillas North Star

== Artists ==
=== Nationals ===
- (Chile) José Alfredo Fuentes
- (Chile) Ginette Acevedo
- (Chile) Sebastián
- (Chile) Roberto Valdés
- (Chile) Juan Carlos Duque
- (Chile) Pachuco y la Cubanacán
- (Chile) Bermuda Show
- (Chile) (Italy) Andrea Tessa
- (Chile) Los Luceros del Bailongo
- (Chile) Eduardo Trujillo
- (Chile) Carlos Alegría
- (Chile) Peter Rock
- (Chile) Patricio Renán
- (Chile) Jorge Eduardo
- (Chile) Malibú
- (Chile) Antonio Gubbins
- (Chile) Cecilia Echeñique
- (Chile) Gloria Simonetti
- (Chile) Óscar Andrade
- (Chile) Alejandra Álamo
- (Chile) Juan Antonio Labra
- (Chile) Mónica De Calixto
- (Chile) Carlos Vásquez
- (Chile) Antonio Prieto
- (Chile) Los Huasos Quincheros
- (Chile) Florcita Motuda

== International entertainers ==
- (United Kingdom) Albert Hammond
- (Colombia) Amparito Jiménez
- (Panama) Salinka
- (Mexico) Armando Manzanero
- (Spain) Pablo Abraira
- (France) Valerio
- (Spain) Francisco
- (Netherlands) Julio Bernardo Euson
- (Argentina) Silvana Di Lorenzo
- (Argentina) Las Mellizas del Tango
- (Argentina) Leonor Benedetto
- (Israel) Ofra Haza
- (Brazil) Nelson Ned
- (Spain) Julio Iglesias
- (Puerto Rico) Danny Rivera

== Comedians ==
- Juan Verdaguer
- Jorge Romero "Firulete"
- José Luis Giogia
- Carlos Helo
- Coco Legrand
- Los Morisquetos
- Mino Valdez and company
- Gila
- Ronco Retes

== Magazine ==
- Ali Bongo, English magician
- Ivan Núñez, pianist
- Gloria Benavides, show-woman
- Osvaldo Cuadros, drummer
- Pepe Tapia, magician
- Chicho Azúa fenomímica
- Daniel Lencina, trumpeter

== Children's section ==
- Tia Gabriela
- Tio Memo
- Tía Patricia

== Adult's section ==
- Magie Lay
- Sissi Lobato
- Maripepa Nieto
- Pitica and Bibi Ubilla
- Wendy
- Magaly Acevedo
- Teresita Rouge

== Transmission ==
- 12.10.3.8 TVUN Red del Norte
- UCV Televisión
- Televisión Nacional de Chile
- Teleonce Universidad de Chile
- Corporación de Televisión Universidad Católica de Chile
