= Noboa =

Noboa is a surname in the Spanish language. It is an alternative form of the more common surname Novoa.

- Álvaro Noboa (born 1950), Ecuadorian politician
- Christian Noboa Tello (born 1985), Ecuadorian football player
- Daniel Noboa (born 1987), Ecuadorian politician and businessman, President of Ecuador (2023–)
- Diego Noboa y Arteta (1789–1870), President of Ecuador from 1850 to 1851
- Gustavo Noboa (1937–2021), President of Ecuador from 2000 to 2003
- Isabel Noboa (born 1946), Ecuadorian businessperson, sister of Álvaro Noboa
- Junior Noboa (born 1964), Dominican baseball player
