= Alberto Kalach =

Mexican architect (born 1960)

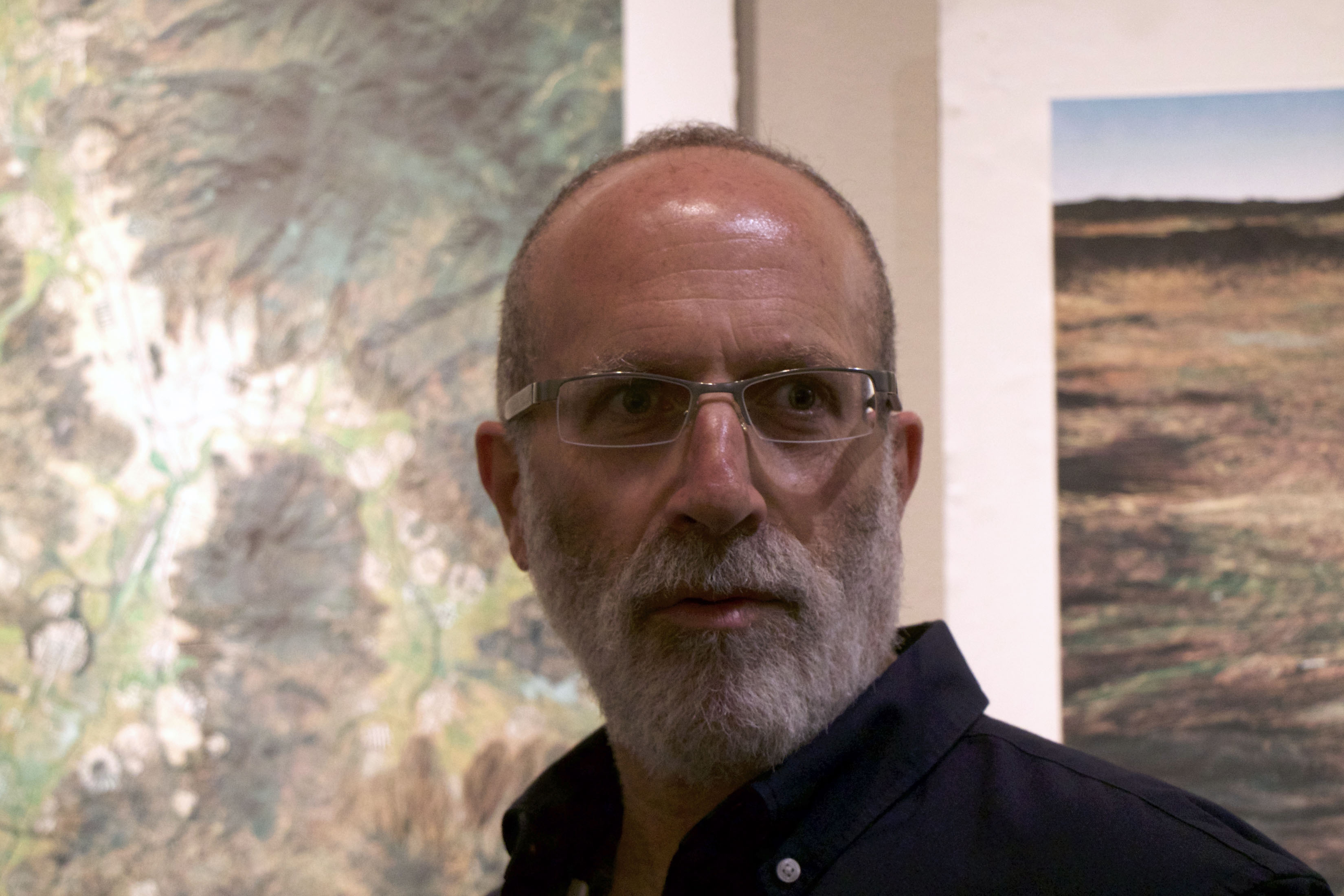
- Kalach in 2018
- Born: 1960 (age 65–66); Mexico City
- Education: Universidad Iberoamericana, Cornell University
- Occupation: Architect
- Projects: Jose Vasconcelos Library

Alberto Kalach (born 1960) is a Mexican architect.

== Biography ==
Alberto Kalach is of Jewish descent, born in Mexico City, studied architecture at the Universidad Iberoamericana, Mexico City, and completed graduate studies later at Cornell University in Ithaca. In 1981 he founded the firm "Taller de Arquitectura X" with Daniel Álvarez, with whom he worked until 2002, when Álvarez left the firm. While he continues to direct TAX, in 2002 his interests also turned to the urban planning problems of his home town, and founded the community "México: future city" (Spanish: México: ciudad futura). He realized several joint projects, some of them with notable colleagues like Teodoro González de León, Gustavo Lipkau and Jose Castillo. His lake concepts were significant in solving existing water supply problems in Mexico City. He published several articles in national and international magazines of architecture, and participates in the "Recovering the City of Lakes" project (Spanish: Vuelta a la ciudad lacustre).

== Notable works ==
- 1999: Casa GGG, Mexico City
- 2000-2008 Casa La Atalaya, California
- 2002: Jose Vasconcelos Library, Mexico City
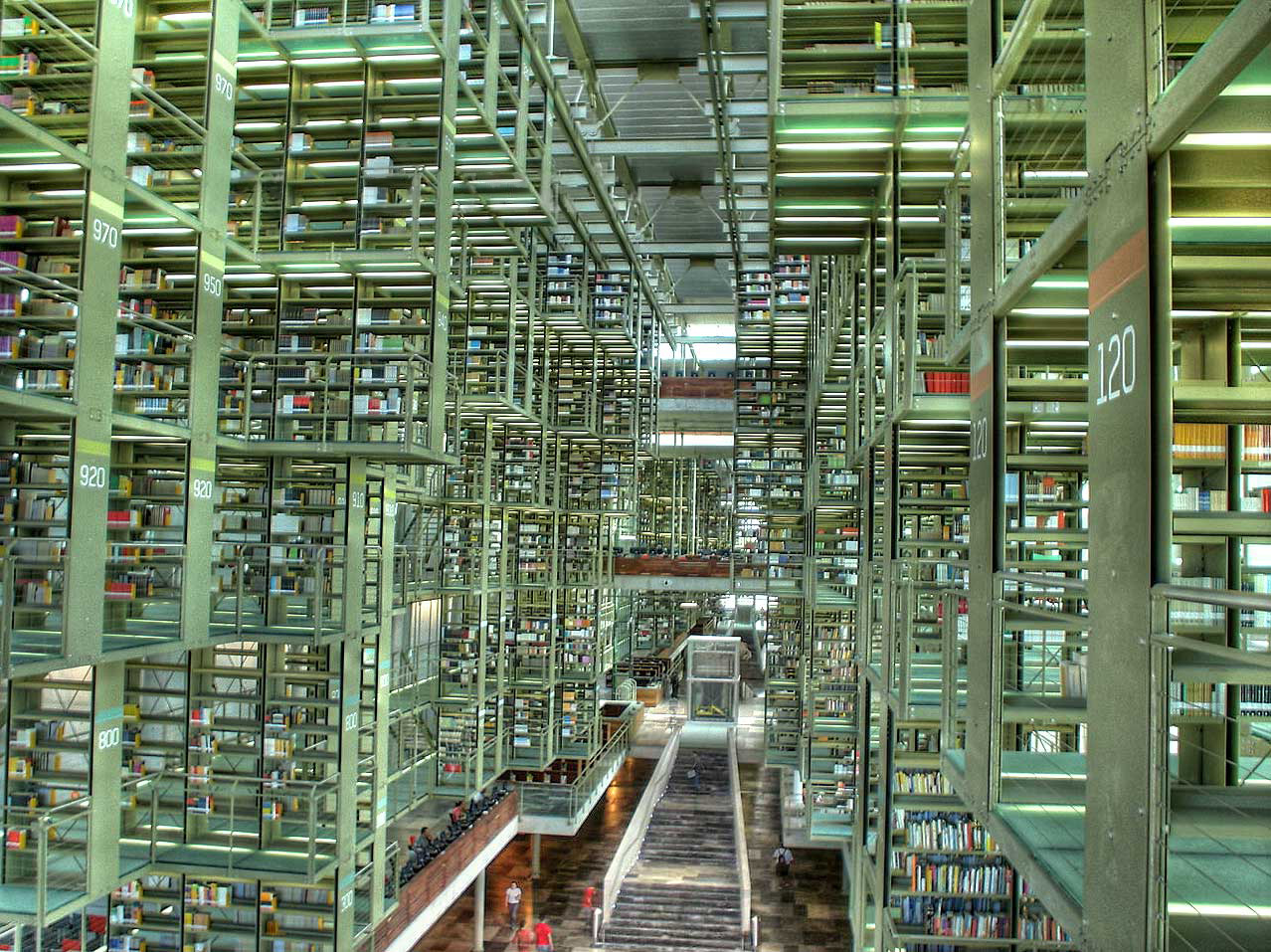
  Jose Vasconcelos Library
- 2004: Casa Romany, California
- 2007-2010: Reforma 27 Tower, Mexico City

== Design awards ==
- 1984: 2nd, 71st Paris prize bestowal of the art school in Columbus, Indiana
- 1985: 3rd, international design competition for the museum of modern arts in Bonn, Germany
- 1996: 1st, international design competition for the Petrosino Park, New York City (together with Ricardo Regazzoni and Julio González Rojas)
- 1996: 1st, design competition of the Colegio Alemán Alexander von Humboldt in Puebla, Puebla (together with Felipe Buendía and Moises Miserachi)
- 2004: 1st, international design competition for the José Vasconcelos Library (together with Juan Palomar, Gustavo Lipkau and Tonatiuh Martínez)
