= Capital punishment in Chile =

Capital punishment in Chile is legally sanctioned, albeit with significant limitations. Since its abolition for civilian offenses in 2001, its application has been restricted to military personnel convicted of war crimes and crimes against humanity committed during wartime. This places Chile among the seven countries globally that have abolished capital punishment solely for ordinary crimes.

The method of execution in Chile is by shooting, with the last instance occurring on January 29, 1985, when two serial killers, Jorge Sagredo and Carlos Topp, were executed by firing squad. Historical records indicate that between 1890 and 1967, 53 individuals were sentenced to death and subsequently executed, while many others had their sentences commuted.

Chile has actively supported the United Nations Moratorium on the death penalty since 2007 and has consistently voted in its favor. Additionally, Chile is a signatory to the Second Optional Protocol to the International Covenant on Civil and Political Rights, which aims for the global abolition of capital punishment. However, Chile has invoked a reservation under Article 2.1 of the treaty, permitting execution during wartime for the conviction of the most serious military-related crimes committed during such periods. The country signed the treaty on November 15, 2001, and ratified it on September 26, 2008.
