= Montemar Institute of Marine Biology =

General information
- Architectural style: Modernist
- Location: Viña del Mar, Valparaíso Region, Chile
- Construction started: 1941
- Completed: 1959

Design and construction
- Architect: Enrique Gebhard

The Montemar Institute of Marine Biology (Spanish: Estación de Biología Marina de Montemar) is a modern building in Viña del Mar, Valparaíso Region, Chile. Built between 1941 and 1959, it is considered the most important work of Chilean architect Enrique Gebhard and one of the most representative examples of modern architecture in Chile.

The building was added to the 2008 World Monuments Watch List of 100 Most Endangered Sites, published by the World Monuments Fund, with the cited reason that its architectural value is being threatened by additions made to the building.

== History ==
On August 28, 1941 the rector of the University of Chile decreed the foundation of the Institute and professor Parmenio Yáñez as its first director. The building's design and construction was done taking into consideration the presence of local fishermen in order to preserve the area's previous use, and to establish a working collaboration between the fishermen and the scientific research done at the station.

After the founding of the Universidad de Valparaíso, the Institute's building became home to that university's Faculty of Ocean Sciences.
