= Cristóbal Cobo =

Chilean academic (born 1976)

Juan Cristóbal Cobo Romani
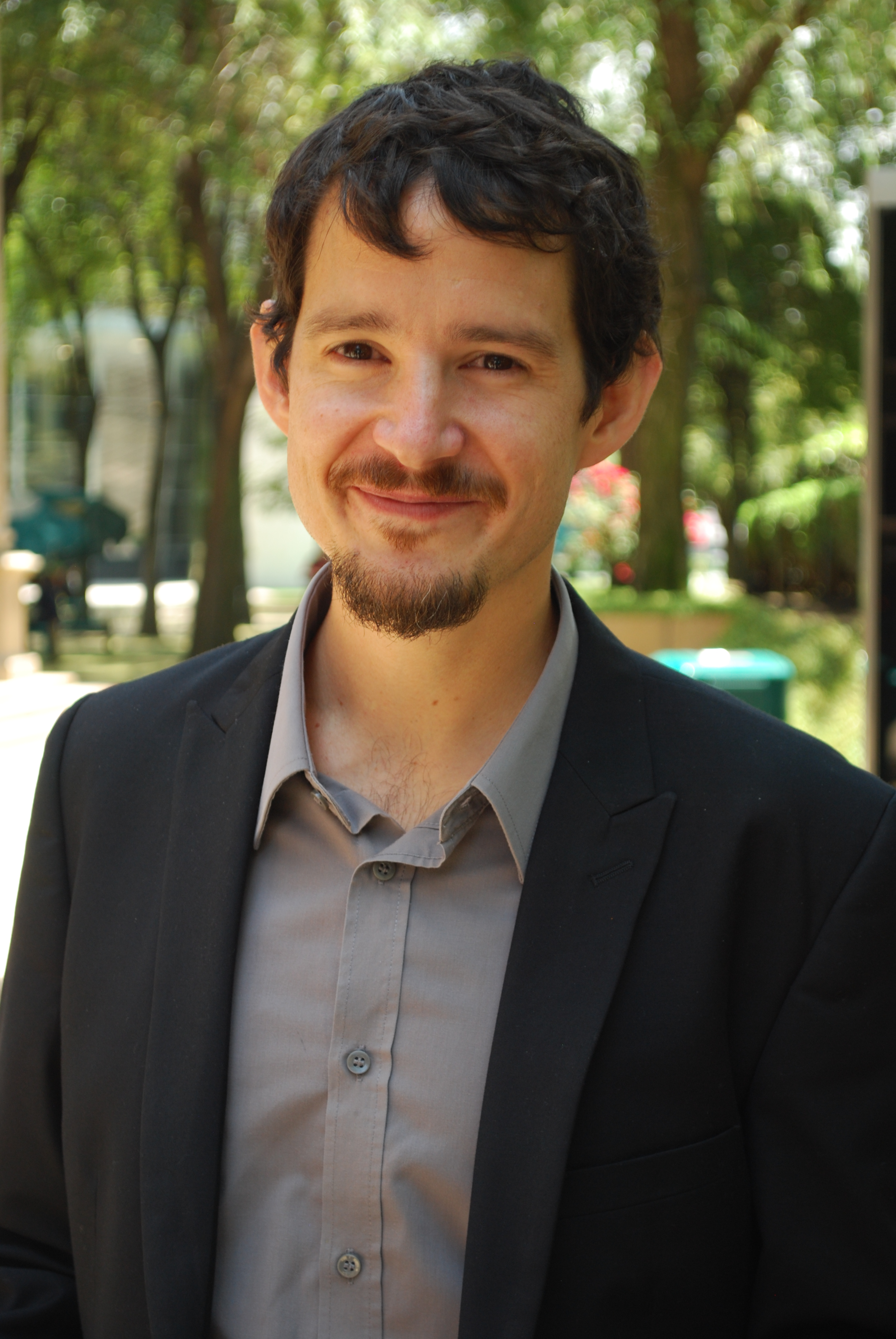
- Cobo at the ITESM-Mexico City Campus
- Born: March 19, 1976 (age 50); Santiago, Chile
- Known for: Invisible Learning meta-theory
- Scientific career
- Fields: Communications, new technologies, educational technologies
- Website: https://blogs.worldbank.org/en/team/c/cristobal-cobo

Cristóbal Cobo (full name Juan Cristóbal Cobo Romani: born March 19, 1976) is a senior education and technology specialist at the World Bank. Previously he was professor and researcher in new and educational technologies, who worked on projects in South America, North America and Europe. He currently is a research fellow at the Oxford Internet Institute, and associate at the Centre on Skills, Knowledge and Organisational Performance, part of the University of Oxford, England. His main theoretical contribution is the concept of “invisible learning,” promoting the idea that learning should be a result of action and interaction, rather than through instruction. He is also a defensor of open access publication, particularly in Latin America.

== Biography and education ==
Cobo was born and raised in Santiago, Chile, attending primary through high school at Colegio Verbo Divino.

He obtained his bachelor's in journalism in 1999 from the Diego Portales University in Santiago, Chile, then went on to earn his masters (2003) and doctorate (2005) from the Autonomous University of Barcelona .

He currently lives in England.

== Career ==
Dr. Cobo is a professor and researcher in communication, new technologies and education technologies. He began his career in 2005 as a professor and director of communication as well as editor of the educational platform at the Latin American Social Sciences Institute (FLACSO) in Mexico, working there from 2005 to 2010. During this time, he also taught classes in communications at National Autonomous University of Mexico, Monterrey Institute of Technology and Higher Studies and was a professor and researcher at the University of Colima .

Cobo has also worked on various education projects in Americas, collaborating with the University of Minnesota, the University of Toronto, the Telefónica Foundation in Argentina and Mexico and Burson-Marsteller in Chile, as well as acting as a consultant for the national education programs in Mexico, Chile, Ecuador, Peru and Argentina.

In 2009, he received a grant from the University of Oxford to research European public policy regarding digital competencies, becoming a visiting follow at the Centre on Skills, Knowledge and Organisational Performance (SKOPE) at the institution. He became a full-time research fellow at the Oxford Internet Institute in 2010, focusing on the development of integrated and interdisciplinary projects related to the Internet.

He has also worked on other projects in Europe such as the K-Network project, focused on the creation of networks on both sides of the Atlantic Ocean, the Socio-Economic Services for European Research project, and the academic online platform Internet Science for the European Commission's Seventh Framework Programme. Between 2011 and 2014 he has coordinated the research division of the OportUnidad project, an open education resource initiative supported by ALFA III.

In 2010, Dr. Cobo was named a member of the Consejo Asesor del Informe Horizon Iberoamérica, part of the New Media Consortium, and serves on the board of the Global Open Educational Resources (OER) Graduate Network and in the ‘Open Education 2030’ board (coordinated by the Institute for Prospective Technological Studies part of the Joint Research Center of the European Commission) .

He has given conferences in all of Latin America as well as the United States, England, the Netherlands, Spain, Portugal and China.

== Research interests and publications ==
His research interests include knowledge transfer, self-learning, digital awareness, skills for innovation, informal learning, knowledge workers, collective intelligence, future of work, human-computer interaction. With John Moravec he is co-author the book "Invisible Learning: Toward a new ecology of education", published by the University of Barcelona; In 2009 he published ‘Information Architecture, usability and Internet‘ (2009). Earlier, in collaboration with Hugo Pardo, he wrote one of the first books about the Web 2.0 in Spanish. Cobo has also worked as evaluator of national policies on education and technology, such as Enciclomedia at the Secretariat of Public Education (Mexico).

Dr. Cobo supervises publications created by the world bank education group and policy development, in the areas of edTech and Adaptive Learning

== Ideas ==
With emphasis on the need for open content and open knowledge, Cobo has promoted the ideas that education should be a continuous process and flexible to changing needs. He believes there should be a balance between F2F and virtual learning environments and to mix them to complement each other, and has criticized the use of technology in education currently as contradictory and confusing, with too much promotion of products by companies not necessarily focused in improving education.

Cobo, argues the challenges of a more open science: "we exclude a lot of communities, which might be equally interested in producing science or consuming science, but they may not have the English or the access to journals data bases to do those things. So we have here this kind of tradeoff between this approach of we need to publish open access for everybody but we have this restriction where if people don't have the English or the access they cannot be a part of this game."

His main contribution to educational theory is the concept of “invisible learning,” the idea that most of what people learn comes from doing new things, rather than through explicit instruction. He promotes “invisible learning” not as a theory but as a meta-theory with the aim of incorporating different ideas and perspectives and as a “work in progress.” It is highly influenced by the notion and values of open source in the sense that it should be developed collaboratively. The idea is to convert the classroom into a laboratory, incubatory or workshop instead of a place for monologues.
