= Carlos Toro =

Chilean footballer (born 1976)

Personal information
- Full name: Carlos Antonio Toro Coronado
- Date of birth: 4 February 1976 (age 50)
- Place of birth: Viña del Mar, Chile
- Height: 1.79 m (5 ft 10 1/2 in)
- Position: Goalkeeper

Youth career
- Everton

Senior career*
Years	Team	Apps	(Gls)
1994–1997	Everton		
1998–1999	San Luis		
2000–2002	Santiago Wanderers		
2003–2004	Everton		
2005	Provincial Osorno		

International career
1995	Chile U20		
2001	Chile	3	(0)
2001	Chile B	1	(0)
- * Club domestic league appearances and goals

Carlos Antonio Toro Coronado (born 4 February 1976) is a Chilean former football goalkeeper.

== Club career ==
He reached his better season with Santiago Wanderers in 2001, being called up to the Chile national team.

== International career ==
He represented Chile at under-20 level in both the 1995 South American Championship and the 1995 FIFA World Youth Championship.

At senior level, he made his debut on 21 March 2001 in a friendly against Honduras. He obtained a total number of three caps for his native country, and was a member of the team competing at the 2001 Copa América. In addition, he made an appearance for Chile B in the friendly match against Catalonia on 28 December 2001.

== Personal life ==
In 2007, Toro moved and settled in Mallorca, Spain, along with his family.

His son is also a goalkeeper who trialed with Universidad Católica and Colo-Colo and played for Malleco Unido.

== Honours ==
Santiago Wanderers

- Primera División de Chile (1): 2001
