= Felipe Díaz (footballer) =

Chilean footballer (born 1983)

Personal information
- Full name: Felipe Andrés Díaz Henríquez
- Date of birth: 9 August 1983 (age 43)
- Place of birth: Santiago, Chile
- Height: 1.71 m (5 ft 7 in)
- Position: Midfielder

Senior career*
Years	Team	Apps	(Gls)
2006–2016	Santiago Morning	290	(34)
2011	→ Rangers (loan)	38	(2)
2014–2015	→ Deportes Antofagasta (loan)	8	(0)
Total		336	(36)
- * Club domestic league appearances and goals

Felipe Andrés Díaz Henríquez (born 9 August 1983) is a Chilean former footballer.

== Honours ==
=== Club ===
Rangers

- Primera B: 2011
