= Cristián Reynero =

Chilean footballer (born 1979)

Personal information
- Full name: Cristián Eduardo Reynero Cerda
- Date of birth: August 25, 1979 (age 47)
- Place of birth: Chillán, Chile
- Height: 1.84 m (6 ft 0 in)
- Position: Centre-back

Team information
- Current team: Unión Española (assistant)

Youth career
- Huachipato

Senior career*
Years	Team	Apps	(Gls)
1999–2006	Huachipato	244	(22)
2007	Deportes Antofagasta	19	(2)
2007–2010	Audax Italiano	67	(9)
2011	Ñublense	14	(0)
2011	Curicó Unido	14	(1)
2012	Deportes La Serena	23	(1)
2013	San Marcos	4	(0)
2013–2015	Barnechea	49	(3)
2015	Deportes Puerto Montt	0	(0)
Total		434	(38)

International career
2000	Chile U23		

Managerial career
- 2015–2018: San Luis (assistant)
- 2018–2021: Santiago Wanderers (assistant)
- 2021: O'Higgins (assistant)
- 2022–2023: Universidad de Concepción (assistant)
- 2024–2025: Deportes Iquique (assistant)
- 2025–: Unión Española (assistant)
- * Club domestic league appearances and goals

Cristián Eduardo Reynero Cerda (born August 25, 1979 in Chile) is a Chilean former footballer who played as a centre-back. He is the current assistant coach of Miguel Ramírez for Unión Española.

== Club career ==
He started his career with Huachipato, where he played from 1999 to 2006. In the last four seasons with the club, Reynero served as team captain. In 2007, he was signed by Audax Italiano. He has played over 300 games in the Primera División de Chile.

Reynero retired in the second half of 2015. His last club was Deportes Puerto Montt.

== Coaching career ==
Following his retirement, Reynero assumed as the assistant coach of Miguel Ramírez for San Luis de Quillota and continued with him the next years.
