= Cornejo Rodolfo =

Chilean handball player (born 1983)

Personal information
- Nationality: Chilean
- Born: 7 September 1983 (age 43)
- Height: 1.90 m (6 ft 3 in)

Sport
- Sport: Handball
- Position: Left back
- Current club: Santiago Steel
National team
Years	Team	Apps	(Gls)
–	Chile	18	(30)

Cornejo Rodolfo (born 7 September 1983) is a Chilean handball player for Santiago Steel and the Chilean national team.
