= David Allende =

Chilean footballer (born 1986)

Personal information
- Full name: David Enrique Allende Paez
- Date of birth: 15 May 1986 (age 40)
- Place of birth: Los Andes, Chile
- Height: 1.82 m (6 ft 0 in)
- Position: Defender

Senior career*
Years	Team	Apps	(Gls)
2004–2005	Trasandino	–	(–)
2006–2010	San Marcos de Arica	78	(2)
2012	Magallanes	25	(0)
2013–2014	Trasandino	14	(0)
- * Club domestic league appearances and goals as of 4 April 2020

David Enrique Allende Paez (born 15 May 1986) was a Chilean footballer. His last club was Trasandino, then Tercera División de Chile side.

== Honours ==
=== Player ===
San Marcos de Arica

- Tercera División de Chile (1): 2007
