= Flora Sanhueza =

Chilean activist (1911–1974)

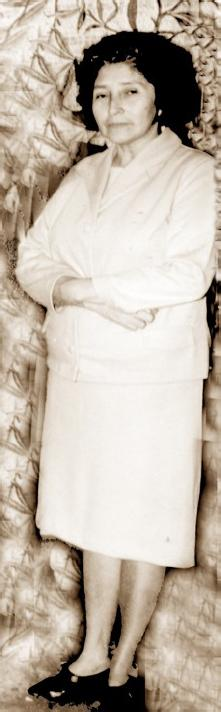
- Born: Flora Sanhueza Rebolledo; 1911; Kingdom of Spain
- Died: 18 September 1974 (aged 62–63); Iquique, Republic of Chile
- Children: Héctor Pavélic Sanhueza
- Armed struggle
- Allegiance: Republican faction; French Resistance
- Branch: Durruti Column
- Active years: 1936-1945
- Conflicts: Spanish Civil War; World War II

Flora Sanhueza Rebolledo (1911 – 18 September 1974) was a Spanish–born Chilean anarchist activist. Imprisoned at Pisagua internment camp during the Military dictatorship, Sanhueza later died from her injuries sustained during torture.

== Early life ==
Sanhueza was born in 1911 in Spain to Basque anarchist parents. Following the 1917 Spanish general strike Sanhueza's parents were exiled and settled in Iquique, Chile.

== Anarchism ==
In 1935, Sanhueza travelled to Spain where she would later fight for the Republican faction in the Spanish Civil War under Buenaventura Durruti. Following the defeat of the Republican faction, Sanhueza and her partner (Note: An unnamed Yugoslavian communist.) escaped to France where they were later interned in a concentration camp. Managing to escape in 1942, Sanhueza joined the French Resistance.

In 1946, Sanhueza returned to Chile and founded the Luisa Michel Athenaeum (Spanish: Ateneo Luisa Michel), named after the French anarchist Louise Michel, in Iquique the following year. Initially dedicated to educate women who weaved fishing nets, the Athenaeum was renamed the Luisa Michel Libertarian School (Spanish: Escuela Libertaria Luisa Michel) in 1953 and provided education to local workers until 1957.

== Arrest and death ==
On 11 September 1973, Sanhueza was placed under house arrest. Sanhueza was later taken to Pisagua internment camp. In the camp Sanhueza was subjected to sexual violence, and is known to have been tortured by being hung from a pillar and being used as a target for target practice. On 24 September 1973 Sanhueza's son, Héctor Pavélic Sanhueza, was also taken to the same camp.

Sanhueza was later transported to San Juan de Dios Hospital in Santiago to be treated for her injuries obtained during torture. Sanhueza was released and transferred back to her home in Iquique (Note: Also cited as Santiago.) where she soon died from her injuries on 18 September 1974.
