= Carmen Novoa =

Uruguayan-born Australian artist and poet

Carmen Ibis Novoa
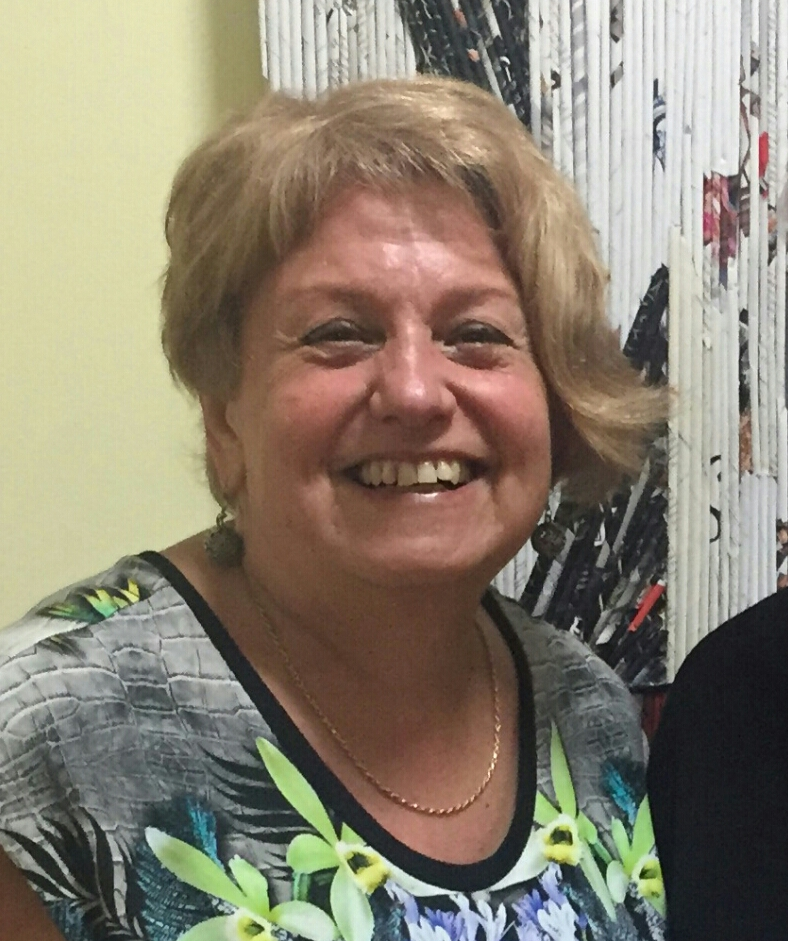
- Novoa in 2017
- Born: 21 August 1941 (age 85); Montevideo, Uruguay
- Education: Footscray Art Center, Melbourne
- Occupations: Author writer painter poet
- Writing career
- Years active: 2002–present
- Genres: Fiction poetry surrealism mixed media
- Subjects: Latino culture multiculturalism
- Notable works: Evasion/Evasion; Arabescos; Rozando Memorias
- Website: carmen.net.au

Carmen Ibis Novoa (born 21 August 1941) is a Uruguayan artist, painter, award-winning writer and poet. Novoa was born in El Cerro, a suburb of Montevideo and immigrated to Melbourne in 1978 where she currently resides. Novoa was the first person to organise an exhibition in Parliament House, Melbourne building. Julia Gillard who is a former Australian Prime Minister officially opened one of her art exhibitions in Melbourne.

== Art and literary career ==
Novoa has been featured in Spanish national newspapers as well as in Uruguay highlighting her art Exhibitions and literary works. In 2005 One particular newspaper in Uruguay featured Novoa in 2 full inside pages in colour regarding her poetry book Evasion/Evasion and her paintings. In 2005 Novoa held an art exhibition in the Uruguayan national library; there she also launched her book Evasion/Evasion.

With the sponsorship of Uruguayan born Telmo Languiller, speaker of the Victorian Legislative Assembly, Novoa brought together 24 artists and coordinated a Latin art exhibition in Parliament House, Melbourne building. This was historically recorded as it was the first art exhibition held in Parliament house then again in 2004.

In 2003, Novoa organised the Spanish and Latin American exhibition of painting, sculpture and ceramics at the Wyndham. It was opened by former 27th Prime Minister of Australia Julia Gillard. The exhibition hosted many Hispanic and Latin American artists. Gillard referred to it as an outstanding exhibition in a letter of praise.

In 2006, Novoa received an AU$1000 grant from City of Brimbank to paint murals on canvas that reflect the local area, this was applied by the Uruguayan Social club of Melbourne where the unveiling took place amidst a celebration with music and dance. 2 of her most recent artistic career highlights was her painting featured in Confluencias, a very important exhibition to the Latino community in Australia held at The Treasures of the Museum of Freemasonry in Sydney, This exhibition is made possible by a partnership with the consulates of Argentina, Brazil, Ecuador, Peru and Uruguay. Her last Exhibition together with fellow Latino Melbourne based artists Latin American Art Expressions held at Melbourne's heritage listed building of The Mission to Seafarers, a non-profit organisation providing support to seafarers since 1857.

Since the year 2000, Novoa has studied art under the tutelage of Robert Mangion for the Footscray Community Art Centre to which she attributes her success in her many art exhibitions.

Novoa has authored 2 books. Her first Evasion/Evasion is a bilingual publication in 2004 of Spanish poetry with English translations by Beatriz Copello. Both books are currently available at The National Library of Australia. Her second book Arabescos published in 2009 is of short stories in Spanish.

== Philanthropy ==
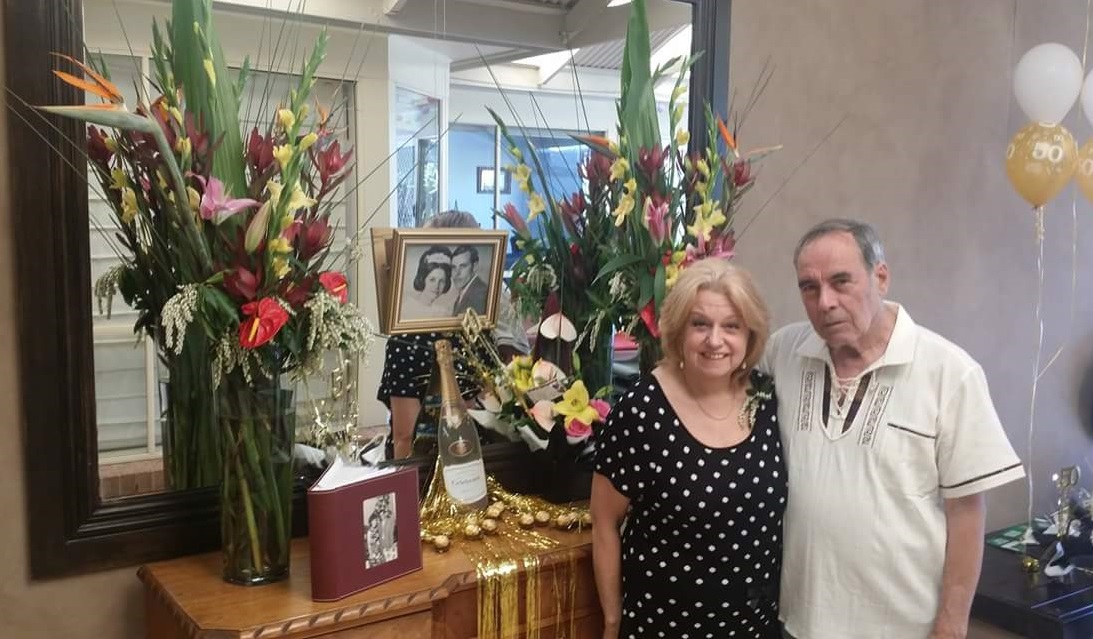
Carmen Novoa with husband Washington Novoa on their 50th wedding anniversary

Novoa has been a volunteer at the Uruguayan Social Club for over 15 years, tutoring members in art and running exhibitions. She has organised many events and secured a grant from the council in her area to create murals.

Novoa has worked extensively for the group Uruguayans United who raise money through a festival in Sydney once a year. This money is use for the purchase of used hospital equipment in Australia and then sent as a donation to Uruguay. The Australian government together with the Uruguayan consulate general work together in order to ship the goods to public hospitals in Uruguay. Novoa has utilised the volunteers of the Uruguayan social club of Melbourne to help raise funds for Uruguayans United.

Novoa, her son, and other volunteers of the Uruguayans United organisation based in Sydney worked on a charitable cause which was a major highlight in 2001, the Mildura military base hospital auction in which just over thirty thousand dollars was spent on hospital good that were later sent to Uruguay.

== Books published ==
- Evasion/Evasion. Beatriz Copello (translator), Earlwood : Bemac Publications 2004
- Arabescos. Sydney : Cervantes Publishing 2009
- Rozando Memorias.

== Awards and mentions ==
- Mention of Honor for short story El clavel de mi pasión at the Consulate General of Colombia's inaugural short story and poetry competition, Sydney 1998.
- First prize for short story La Villa del Cerro at El Rocio de Australia 1999.
- Mention of Honor Mi casa in the XXXIII Literary competition of the Spanish Club of Sydney, Sydney 2001.
- Third prize for the poem Mi Triste Mirada, Literary Group Palabras, Sydney 2006.
- Second prize for short story Jaulas doradas at the Argentinian Social and Cultural center Literary competition presented by the Consulate General of Argentina, Sydney 2013.
