= Wladimir Herrera =

Chilean footballer (born 1981)

Personal information
- Full name: Wladimir Eliseo Herrera Maralicán
- Date of birth: 12 December 1981 (age 44)
- Place of birth: Hualaihué, Chile
- Height: 1.83 m (6 ft 0 in)
- Position: Defender

Senior career*
Years	Team	Apps	(Gls)
1999	Deportes Laja	–	(–)
2000–2005	Ñublense	35	(5)
2006	Audax Italiano	1	(0)
2007	Lota Schwager	34	(2)
2008	Deportes Melipilla	8	(0)
2009	Deportes Copiapó	32	(1)
2010	Deportes Puerto Montt	27	(0)
2011–2012	Lota Schwager	42	(6)
2012–2014	Cobresal	57	(1)
2014–2015	Rangers	17	(0)
2015–2018	Deportes Puerto Montt	81	(4)
Total		334	(19)
- * Club domestic league appearances and goals

Wladimir Eliseo Herrera Maralicán (born 12 December 1981) is a former Chilean footballer who played as a defender.

He finished his career at Deportes Puerto Montt playing in Primera B.

== Honours ==
Ñublense

- Tercera División de Chile: 2004
