= Moisés Mussa =

Moisés Mussa Battal
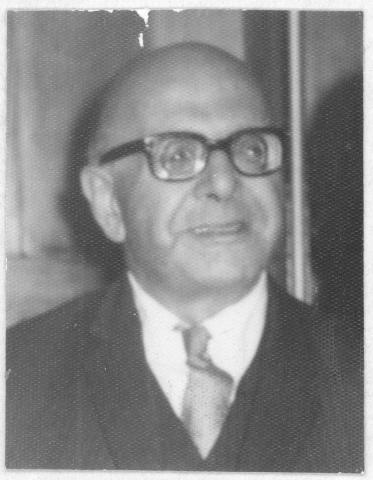
- Born: January 1, 1900; Valparaíso, Chile
- Died: July 27, 1982 (aged 82); Santiago, Chile
- Education: Instituto Pedagógico Columbia University Universidad Central de Madrid (doctorate)
- Parent(s): David Mussa (Father), Elena Battal (Mother)

Moisés Mussa (January 1, 1900 – July 27, 1982) was a Chilean essayist, philosopher and educator of Arab descent.

== Biography ==
He completed his primary education in Santiago and Rancagua. He then completed his secondary education at the Escuela Normal Abelardo Núñez, later transferring to the Instituto Pedagógico.

In 1919, he was appointed primary school teacher in Rancagua, where he taught at the Escuela Superior de Hombres, the oldest in the country, and which in 1985 would be renamed Colegio Moisés Mussa in his honor. In 1964, he would donate his personal library to the school. In that same city he participated in a series of cultural groups, such as the Sociedad de Instrucción Primaria, the Centro de Amigos del Arte, the Centro de la Juventud Radical, and he was also a delegate for the region of O'Higgins of the Federación de Profesores.

In 1925, he moved to Santiago to teach at the Instituto Italiano, where he was a primary school teacher, of philosophy and civic education. In 1926, he taught at the Escuela Normal de Copiapó.

In 1927, he moved to Columbia University, where he earned a Master of Arts degree. The following year, he became the first Latin American to earn a Doctor of Philosophy and Letters degree from Universidad Central de Madrid.

He was president of Instituto Chileno-Árabe de Cultura, and served as a professor at the Facultad de Filosofía y Humanidades of the Universidad de Chile.

== Translations ==
Among the works that Moisés Mussa Battal translated from Arabic into Spanish are:

- The Prophet, by Khalil Gibran;
- The Garden of the Prophet, by Khalil Gibran.

== Works ==
- La psicología educacional
- Posición del hombre en el universo
- Test para escuelas normales
- Guía de observaciones pedagógicas
- Las investigaciones científicas en nuestra educación (1933)
- Problemas vitales del magisterio chileno
- Cuestiones mínimas de observación
- Nuestros alumnos
- Nuestro problema educacional
