= Death of Eduardo Frei Montalva =

Eduardo Frei Montalva, President of Chile (1964 – 1970), was as an opposition leader against the government of President Salvador Allende and initially supported the Chilean coup of 1973 that deposed Allende and established the military dictatorship of Augusto Pinochet. Frei Montalva died in 1982 apparently following routine surgery.

Questions continue to surround the events that led to his death. There have been accusations that Frei was murdered with small doses of toxic substances. Six suspected assassins were found guilty of murdering Frei in January 2019 and were handed sentences ranging from 3 to 10 years in prison. However, the convictions would be overturned in January 2021 by a Chilean Appeal Court and then again by the Chilean Supreme Court in August 2023, as it was found that Frei was not a homicide victim.

== Events leading to the death ==
In 1981, Frei was suffering from chronic acid reflux, stemming from a hiatal hernia, a very uncomfortable but essentially low risk condition. After consulting with several specialists, he decided to have it treated via surgery. The surgery was performed at the Santa María Clinic in Santiago on November 18, 1981 by a team of three surgeons: Dr Augusto Larraín Orrego, Dr Patricio Silva Garín, and Dr Ivo Eterovic. At the time, Dr Larrain was a world-renowned gastric surgeon, as well as a cousin of Andrés Zaldívar, one of Frei's closest advisers.

The initial surgery was considered a success and, after a few days, Frei was discharged to continue his recovery at his home. However, Frei began experiencing fever and pain a few days later and was readmitted to the Santa María Clinic on 4 December. After a complete check, he was diagnosed with an intestinal occlusion and a partial necrosis of the small intestine. He underwent a second (corrective) surgery on 6 December, this time performed by Dr. Patricio Silva Garín.

Despite another initial bout of improvement over the next several days, Frei's health once again severely deteriorated and he was found to be suffering from septic shock and septicaemia. After suffering a complete immune system collapse, Frei died on January 22, 1982.

At the time, his death was attributed to an infection by Candida albicans, contracted either during surgery or due to hospital contamination. He was buried in the Cementerio General de Santiago.

== Controversy ==
Frei's death is a matter of controversy due to allegations that he was poisoned by the DINA, the intelligence service of the military government, allegedly using a toxin produced by biochemist Eugenio Berrios. After Belgian researchers from the University of Ghent reportedly found biological remnants of mustard gas in Frei's body, the former president's family filed a lawsuit, which is still pending as of 2009.

Frei's personal doctor, Patricio Rojas, who was also his minister of Interior and minister of defense during Eduardo Frei Ruiz-Tagle's administration, has denied the accusations. El Mercurio columnist Hermógenes Pérez de Arce, a supporter of the Pinochet dictatorship, disputes even the existence of the Belgian report, citing the denial by the University's chief of communications, Tom de Smedt, that an investigation had been done in that university.

In December 2009, six people were arrested for their roles in the alleged assassination of Frei.

Judge Alejandro Madrid based his decision on a report that determined that Frei was administered low doses of thallium and mustard gas over an extended period while he was hospitalized at the Santa María Clinic in Santiago and that these toxic substances had the effect of decreasing Frei's immune system, making him too weak to survive his surgery".

Nonetheless, the report has been widely criticized on scientific basis as well as by the medical team that participated in the surgery. The Appeals Court attempted to suspend Judge Madrid from the case, while the accused were set free on bail. However, the case re-opened in 2010 after a failed attempt to disqualify Judge Madrid.

In April 2013, the body of poet Pablo Neruda, who died in the same hospital one day before departing for exile, was exhumed amid suspicious of foul play in his death.

=== Accused ===
- Dr Patricio Silva Garín – Head of the second medical team
- Dr Pedro Valdivia Soto – member of the medical team
- Dr Helmar Rosenberg Gómez
- Dr Sergio Gónzalez Bombardiere
- Luis Becerra Arancibia
- Raúl Lillo Gutiérrez

== Trials and convictions ==
On October 10, 2014, two of the accused were found guilty as perpetrators, two were deemed accomplices, and the other two were found guilty of covering up the operation.

On January 30, 2019, all of the six suspects were found guilty of homicide, and were given sentences ranging from 3 to up to 10 years in prison. On 25 January 2021, the convictions would be overturned by a Chile Appeals Court three judge panel which found that Frei was not a homicide victim. The Chilean Supreme Court would also find that Frei was not a homicide victim on 18 August 2023 as well.

=== Perpetrators ===
- Luis Becerra Arancibia
- Raúl Lillo Gutierrez

=== Accomplices ===
- Dr Patricio Silva Garín – Head of the second medical team
- Dr Pedro Valdivia Soto – member of the medical team

=== Involved in coverup ===
- Dr Helmar Rosenberg Gómez
- Dr Sergio Gónzalez Bombardiere

== See also ==
- Chile under Allende
- Chile under Pinochet
- Augusto Pinochet
- Chilean coup of 1973
- Government Junta of Chile (1973)
