= Marcel Holmberg =

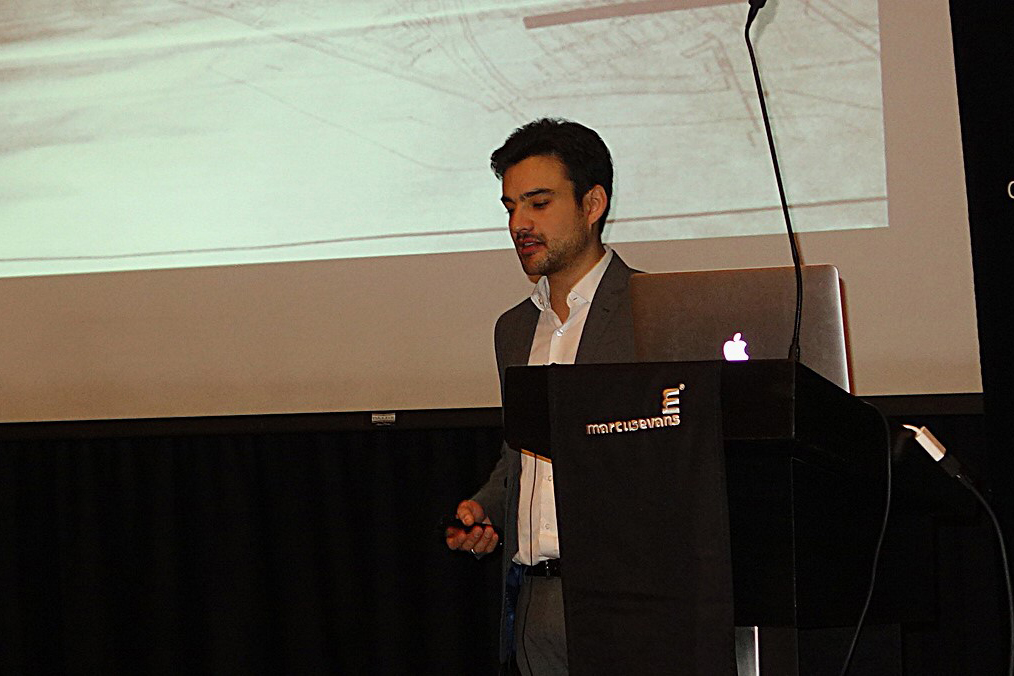
- Marcel Holmberg - Mumbai Architecture Forum 2016
- Born: Marcel Holmberg Quintela; October 27, 1981; Santiago, Chile
- Occupation: Architect

Marcel Holmberg (October 27, 1981, Santiago, Chile) ICA Chartered Architect, founder of maarc studio, previously director and founder of PWD Architecture China.

== Career ==
Marcel Holmberg, the founder of MAARC Studio, has established a strong presence in the architectural world, with the firm now based in Berlin overseeing all projects spanning Europe, Asia, and South America.

Prior to founding MAARC Studio, Marcel gained valuable experience working alongside esteemed German architects such as Ole Scheeren in Berlin and Beijing, as well as Eike Becker and Hadi Teherani in Berlin.

In China, Marcel embarked on a successful venture by establishing and leading his own office, PWD Architecture. The office excelled in designing and constructing a diverse range of mixed-use projects. Marcel also collaborated with the respected French architectural firm AREP architecture on visionary Transport Oriented Developments throughout China.

In Chile, Marcel engaged in fruitful collaborations with architects Marco Polidura, Iñaki Volante, and Javier Bize, contributing to various architectural typologies. Additionally, he served as a dedicated assistant teacher, in university workshops.

== Personal Background ==
From a multicultural background, with roots in a Swedish-German family in southern Chile. His upbringing in Oakland, California, and Santiago, Chile, shaped his early years. Following the completion of his Masters in Architecture, he embarked on a journey that led him to Beijing and ultimately to his current base in Berlin.
