= Washington Torres =

Chilean footballer (born 1984)

Personal information
- Full name: Washington Leandro Torres Trujillo
- Date of birth: 23 May 1984 (age 42)
- Place of birth: Santiago, Chile
- Height: 1.67 m (5 ft 6 in)
- Position: Defender

Team information
- Current team: San Antonio Unido
- Number: 4

Senior career*
Years	Team	Apps	(Gls)
2002–2014	Santiago Morning	260	(20)
2012	→ U. La Calera (loan)	29	(1)
2014–2015	→ San Marcos (loan)	8	(0)
2015	→ Ñublense (loan)	24	(0)
2016–2019	Coquimbo Unido	65	(2)
2020–	San Antonio Unido	1	(0)
- * Club domestic league appearances and goals as of 21 September 2020

Washington Leandro Torres Trujillo (born 23 May 1984) is a Chilean left back who currently plays in Segunda División de Chile side San Antonio Unido.

== Honors ==
=== Club ===
Santiago Morning

- Primera B de Chile (1): 2005
