= Oliver Toledo =

Chilean footballer (born 1987)

Personal information
- Full name: Oliver Adrián Toledo Morandé
- Date of birth: 17 September 1987 (age 39)
- Place of birth: Santiago, Chile
- Height: 1.72 m (5 ft 8 in)
- Position: Attacking midfielder

Youth career
- 1999–2006: Audax Italiano

Senior career*
| Years | Team | Apps | (Gls) |
| 2006–2012 | Audax Italiano | 65 | (6) |
| 2011 | → Curicó Unido (loan) | 28 | (1) |
| 2012 | → Coquimbo Unido (loan) | 36 | (2) |
| 2013 | Iberia | 20 | (3) |
| 2013–2014 | Lota Schwager | 10 | (1) |
| 2013 | Iberia | 20 | (3) |
| 2015–2016 | Deportes Puerto Montt | 16 | (3) |
| Total | | 195 | (19) |
- * Club domestic league appearances and goals

Oliver Adrián Toledo Morandé (born 17 September 1987) is a Chilean former professional footballer who played as an attacking midfielder.

== Career ==
Toledo came to the Audax Italiano youth system at the age of eleven. After playing for them, he was loaned to Curicó Unido and Coquimbo Unido in 2011 and 2012, respectively.

Following Audax Italiano, he played for Iberia, Lota Schwager and Deportes Puerto Montt.

At international level, Toledo was part of a Chile under-25 squad in a training session led by Claudio Borghi in May 2011, being a player of Curicó Unido.

== Honours ==
Audax Italiano

- Primera División de Chile: runner-up 2006 Clausura
