= Rodrigo Paillaqueo =

Chilean footballer (born 1987)

Personal information
- Full name: Rodrigo Alejandro Paillaqueo Muñoz
- Date of birth: 30 May 1987 (age 39)
- Place of birth: Santiago, Chile
- Height: 1.76 m (5 ft 9 in)
- Position: Goalkeeper

Youth career
- 2004–2005: Colo-Colo

Senior career*
Years	Team	Apps	(Gls)
2006–2007	Colo-Colo	0	(0)
2007	→ Coquimbo Unido (loan)	0	(0)
2008–2015	Magallanes	120	(0)
2015–2016	San Antonio Unido	32	(0)
2016–2017	Unión La Calera	24	(0)
2017	Deportes Pintana	20	(0)
2018–2022	Deportes Santa Cruz	96	(0)
2023	Deportes Rengo	23	(0)
Total		315	(0)
- * Club domestic league appearances and goals

Rodrigo Alejandro Paillaqueo Muñoz (born 30 May 1987) is a Chilean former football goalkeeper.

== Career ==
His last club was Deportes Rengo in 2023.

== Honours ==
Magallanes

- Tercera División de Chile: 2010
- Copa Chile: Runner-up 2011
