= Moisés Ávila =

Chilean footballer (born 1974)

Personal information
- Full name: Moisés Alejandro Avila Mena
- Date of birth: April 13, 1974 (age 52)
- Height: 1.76 m (5 ft 9 in)
- Position: Forward

Senior career*
Years	Team	Apps	(Gls)
1994–1995	O'Higgins	26	(8)
1996	Colo-Colo	15	(1)
1997–1999	Santiago Wanderers	38	(5)
1999	O'Higgins	14	(2)
2000	Everton		
2001	Universidad de Chile		
2002	Unión Española		
2003	Audax Italiano		
2004–2005	O'Higgins	26	(8)
2005–2006	Santiago Morning	22	(8)
Medal record
First place	Chilean Primera División	1996
First place	Copa Chile	1996
Second place	Primera B de Chile	1999
- * Club domestic league appearances and goals

Moisés Alejandro Avila Mena (born April 13, 1974) is a Chilean former footballer who had a long career in domestic football.

== Titles ==
- Colo-Colo 1996 (Chilean Primera División Championship and Copa Chile)
- Santiago Morning 2005 (Chilean Primera B Championship)
