= Raúl Muñoz (footballer, born 1975) =

Chilean footballer

Personal information
- Full name: Raúl Andrés Muñoz Mardones
- Date of birth: 25 May 1975 (age 51)
- Place of birth: Curicó, Chile
- Height: 1.80 m (5 ft 11 in)
- Position: Left back

Youth career
- Escuela Municipal Curicó

Senior career*
Years	Team	Apps	(Gls)
1993	Unión Santa Cruz	12	(0)
1994–1996	Santiago Wanderers	62	(5)
1997–2002	Colo-Colo	133	(6)
1999–2000	→ Numancia (loan)	5	(0)
2003	Krylia Sovetov	0	(0)
2003–2004	San Luis Potosí	19	(4)
2004	Audax Italiano	26	(4)
Total		257	(19)

International career
1997–2003	Chile	7	(0)
1998–2001	Chile B	2	(0)
- * Club domestic league appearances and goals

Raúl Andrés Muñoz Mardones (born 25 May 1975) is a Chilean retired footballer who played as a left back.

== Club career ==
Muñoz was born in Curicó, Maule Region. As a child, he was with Escuela de Fútbol Municipal de Curicó (Municipal Football Academy of Curicó), later named Juventud 2000, what was founded by the former professional footballer Luis Hernán Álvarez. During his ten-year professional career he played in his country for Unión Santa Cruz, Santiago Wanderers, Colo-Colo (two stints) and Audax Italiano – where he retired at only 29 – also having abroad spells in Spain (CD Numancia), Russia (PFC Krylia Sovetov Samara) and Mexico (San Luis FC).

== International career ==
Muñoz earned seven caps for Chile, his debut coming on 2 April 1997 in a friendly against Brazil. He was selected in the squad for that year's Copa América. In addition, he played for Chile B twice: in the 2–1 win against England B on 10 February 1998, and in the 0–1 loss against Catalonia on 28 December 2001.

== Honours ==
=== Club ===
Santiago Wanderers

- Segunda División de Chile (1): 1995

Colo-Colo

- Primera División de Chile (3): 1997 Clausura, 1998, 2002 Clausura
