= Los Bochincheros =

Chilean children's program

Los Bochincheros was a popular children's program created in Chile that ran from 1976 to 1983. It premiered on the Chilevisión TV channel. It was hosted by Tío Memo and Tía Pucherito, a young couple, who after a few years living in Uruguay, returned to Chile and created the TV show. Los Bochincheros was one of the most widely viewed TV shows in Chile and El Salvador during the 1980s.
