= Hugo Díaz (footballer, born 1987) =

Chilean footballer

Personal information
- Full name: Hugo Andrés Díaz Fernández
- Date of birth: 23 February 1987 (age 39)
- Place of birth: Santiago, Chile
- Height: 1.78 m (5 ft 10 in)
- Position: Midfielder

Team information
- Current team: Fernández Vial
- Number: 21

Youth career
- Cobresal

Senior career*
Years	Team	Apps	(Gls)
2006–2009	Cobresal	89	(1)
2010	Everton	26	(1)
2011	Cobreloa	19	(0)
2012–2016	Rangers	75	(0)
2016–2017	San Antonio Unido	20	(2)
2018–	Fernández Vial	–	(–)
- * Club domestic league appearances and goals as of 15 February 2018

Hugo Andrés Díaz Fernández (born 23 February 1987) is a Chilean footballer, who currently plays as a midfielder for Fernández Vial.
