= Enrique Gebhard =

Chilean architect (1909–1978)

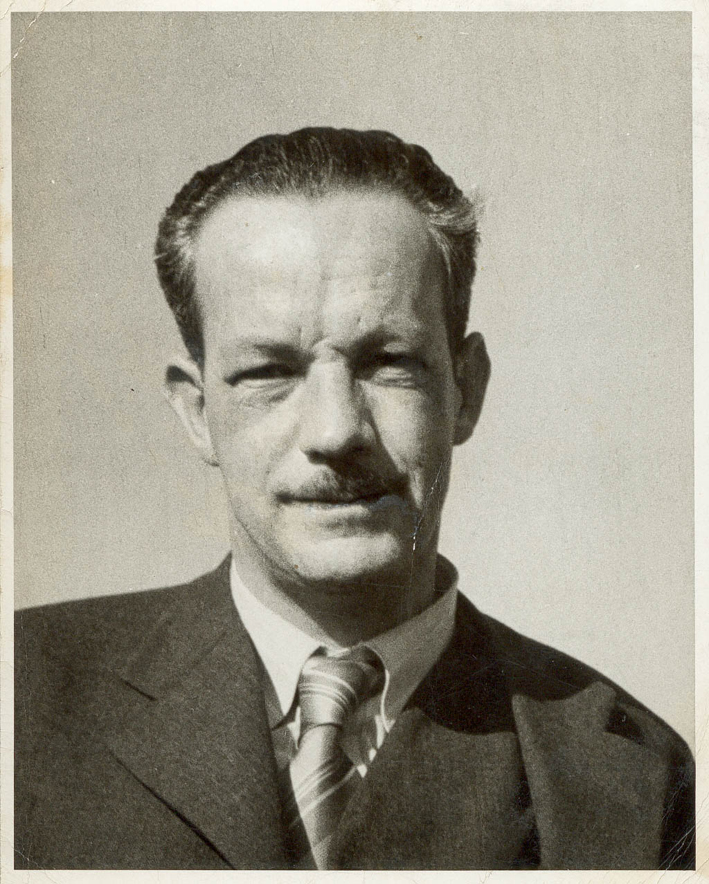
Enrique Gebhard.

Enrique Gebhard (Traiguén, December 19, 1909 - Santiago, May 21, 1978) was a Chilean architect.

== Early life ==
He was first born son of the German farmer Enrique Gebhard Spuhr (1887 - 1971) and the Chilean Celia Paulus Olivares (1889 - 1961). From a very young age he showed special skills for drawing and design. In fact, in his adolescence, it helped to his father in works of masonry and smaller constructions destined to agricultural activities.

== Architecture ==
Gebhard designed the Montemar Institute of Marine Biology in 1944.
