= Jonathan Novoa =

Chilean footballer and manager (born 1981)

Personal information
- Full name: Jonathan Alberto Novoa Tiznado
- Date of birth: 21 August 1981 (age 45)
- Place of birth: Talcahuano, Chile
- Height: 1.81 m (5 ft 11 in)
- Position: Forward

Senior career*
Years	Team	Apps	(Gls)
2001	U. de Concepción	0	(0)
2002–2003	Huachipato	5	(0)
2004	Fernández Vial	–	(–)
2005–2006	O'Higgins	8	(0)
2007	Fernández Vial	33	(6)
2008	San Marcos de Arica	36	(13)
2009	Antofagasta	13	(3)
2009–2011	Puerto Montt	82	(29)
2012–2013	Everton	16	(3)
2013–2014	Lota Schwager	35	(5)
2014–2015	Rangers	14	(0)

Managerial career
- 2018: Independiente de Hualqui
- * Club domestic league appearances and goals as of 30 March 2020

Jonathan Alberto Novoa Tiznado (born 21 August 1981) was a Chilean footballer and current manager. His last club as professional player was Rangers.

He was born in Talcahuano, Chile.
