= Gonzalo Novoa =

Chilean footballer (born 1986)

Personal information
- Full name: Gonzalo Ignacio Novoa Contreras
- Date of birth: 14 May 1986 (age 40)
- Place of birth: Santiago, Chile
- Height: 1.70 m (5 ft 7 in)
- Position: Defensive midfielder

Youth career
- Universidad de Chile

Senior career*
Years	Team	Apps	(Gls)
2005–2011	Universidad de Chile	11	(0)
2007	→ Deportes Valdivia (loan)	34	(3)
2008	→ Unión Temuco (loan)	28	(1)
2011	→ Deportes Copiapó (loan)	16	(2)
2012–2013	Deportes Temuco	27	(0)
Total		116	(6)
- * Club domestic league appearances and goals

Gonzalo Ignacio Novoa Contreras (born 14 May 1986) is a Chilean former footballer who played as a defensive midfielder. His last club was Deportes Temuco.

== Club career ==
A product of Universidad de Chile's youth system, Novoa was promoted to the first-adult team in 2005 by Héctor Pinto to play the Torneo Apertura. He was part of the players generation of Marcelo Díaz, Sebastián Pinto, Eric Pino, among others.

After completing loan spells in Deportes Valdivia and Unión Temuco to gain experience, in 2009 after being considered by Sergio Markarián he definitively joined The Lions and helped the team to win the Torneo Apertura.

In 2011, he left the club after not being considered by Jorge Sampaoli and joined Primera B (second-tier) side Deportes Copiapó in a long-season deal. Novoa completed the entire season with 2 goals in 16 appearances.

In January 2012, Novoa returned his former club Unión Temuco (owned by Universidad de Chile legend Marcelo Salas) and he stayed here even after the club's merger with Deportes Temuco, making appearances for the B-team in the 2013 Segunda División Profesional. In December 2013, he finished his contract.

== Personal life ==
While playing football, Novoa studied and got a degree in business administration. He later settled in Concepción, Chile.

== Honours ==
Universidad de Chile

- Primera División de Chile (1): 2009 Apertura
