= Enciclomedia =

Enciclomedia was an online education program of the Secretaría de Educación Pública of Mexico. It was based on digital versions of 5th and 6th grade elementary textbooks.

It was the original idea of Dr. Felipe Bracho Carpizo in 1988 when he was the Director of Oriented Research of National Council of Science and Technology.

Dr. Bracho in the late 1980s requested the collaboration of the National Polytechnic Institute and with the help of Eliseo Steve Rodríguez Rodríguez, then a student of the Instituto Tecnológico Autónomo de México developed the first prototype. The collaboration resulted in the creation of a system called SARCRAD (initials of "Sistema de Administración de Recursos Conceptuales y de Referenciación Automática Difusa" or System of Administration of Conceptual Resources and Diffused Automatic Referenciation) by Rodríguez. Enciclomedia is based on SARCRAD, a system that complements lessons from the free textbooks provided by the federal government with videos, text, virtual visits, sounds and images.

Years later the National Pedagogic University, the National Autonomous University of Mexico, Infotec and the Secretary of Public Education built the prototype that later incorporated content from Encarta provided by Microsoft thanks to an existing collaboration agreement between the Secretary of Public Education and Microsoft. Later on the Coordination of Educational Information Technology of the ILCE (which is the responsible body for producing the free textbooks) integrated resources, activities and audiovisuals generated by projects such as Red Escolar, Biblioteca Digital, Sec 21, Sepiensa and material designed exclusively for Enciclomedia.

The program started in 2000. Between 2004 and 2008 it had a budget of $24,827 million Mexican pesos (roughly US$2.5 billion).

The Enciclomedia project was ultimately abandoned. The Mexican government had to pay continuing licensing fees to Microsoft for the core Encarta technology, the Mexican software development effort had added few new interactive functions, and the Mexican editorial development effort found that adding "digital objects" (new topics) was difficult compared to open projects like Wikipedia. A developer who tried to save the added editorial content in the open project 'Encicloabierta' (Open Encyclopedia) faced trial for misuse of "copyrighted materials".

In 2011, it was absorbed into the 'Digital Skills for All' program (Spanish: Habilidades Digitales para Todos).
