= Rubén Castillo (footballer) =

Chilean footballer (born 1985)

Personal information
- Full name: Rubén Castillo
- Date of birth: 24 April 1985 (age 41)
- Place of birth: Santiago, Chile
- Height: 1.75 m (5 ft 9 in)
- Position: Right-back

Senior career*
Years	Team	Apps	(Gls)
2003–2010	Cobreloa		
2007	→ Lota Schwager (loan)		
2011	Fdez. Vial		
- * Club domestic league appearances and goals as of 31 January 2010

Rubén Castillo (born 24 April 1985) is a Chilean former footballer.

His last club was Arturo Fernández Vial.

== Honours ==
=== Club ===
Cobreloa

- Primera División de Chile (3): 2003–A, 2003–C, 2004–C
