= Leonardo Espinoza (footballer, born 1986) =

Chilean footballer (born 1986)

Personal information
- Full name: Leonardo Antonio Espinoza Nova
- Date of birth: 1 July 1986 (age 40)
- Place of birth: San Vicente de Tagua Tagua, Chile
- Height: 1.78 m (5 ft 10 in)
- Position: Forward

Senior career*
Years	Team	Apps	(Gls)
2004	Palestino		
2006–2007	Ñublense		
2007	Colchagua		
2008–2010	O'Higgins		
- * Club domestic league appearances and goals as of 22 March 2020

Leonardo Antonio Espinoza Nova (born 1 July 1986) is a Chilean former professional footballer.
