= Carlos Herrera (footballer, born 1983) =

Chilean footballer (born 1983)

Personal information
- Full name: Carlos Felipe Herrera Contreras
- Date of birth: 6 August 1983 (age 43)
- Place of birth: Graneros, Chile
- Height: 1.79 m (5 ft 10 1/2 in)
- Position: Defender

Youth career
- O'Higgins

Senior career*
Years	Team	Apps	(Gls)
2003–2009	O'Higgins	103	(4)
2010–2011	Palestino	47	(3)
2012	Everton	9	(0)
2013–2015	Cobresal	33	(1)
2015–2016	Ñublense	21	(0)
- * Club domestic league appearances and goals

Carlos Felipe Herrera Contreras (born 6 August 1983) is a Chilean former footballer who played as a defender.

== Career ==
Born in Graneros, Chile, Herrera is a product of O'Higgins. He also played for Palestino, Everton de Viña del Mar, Cobresal and Ñublense.

== Honours ==
Cobresal

- Primera División de Chile (1): 2015 Clausura
