= Viña del Mar psychopaths =

Chilean serial killer duo

Psychopaths of Viña del Mar
- Psicópatas de Viña del Mar
- Sagredo (left) and Topp (right) in archival newspaper shots from the 1980's.
- Born: Jorge José Sagredo Pizarro; 22 August 1955; Viña del Mar, Chile Carlos Alberto Topp Collins; 25 January 1950; Viña del Mar, Chile
- Died: 29 January 1985 (aged 29 and 35); Quillota, Chile
- Cause of death: Execution by firing squad
- Occupations: Policemen and taxi driver (Sagredo)
- Organization: Carabineros de Chile
- Status: Executed
- Conviction: Murder (10 counts)
- Penalty: Death

Details
- Victims: 10 murdered 4 raped 1 burglarized
- Span of crimes: 5 August 1980 – 1 November 1981
- Country: Chile
- State: Valparaíso Region
- Date apprehended: 8 March 1982

The Viña del Mar psychopaths (Spanish: Psicópatas de Viña del Mar) were Chilean serial killer duo Jorge José Sagredo Pizarro (22 August 1955 – 29 January 1985) and Carlos Alberto Topp Collins (25 January 1950 – 29 January 1985), both members of the Carabineros, the local Chilean police forces. They committed ten murders and four rapes between 5 August 1980 and 1 November 1981, in the city of Viña del Mar.

When the two men were caught on 8 March 1982, it was revealed that they had only been discharged from the Carabineros days prior, on 4 March 1982. The case became controversial after more prominent people were implicated, but only Sagredo and Topp were punished. Both men were sentenced to death and executed by firing squad on 29 January 1985.

Sagredo and Topp were the last men to be legally executed in Chile before the practice was outlawed in 2001.

== History ==
=== Crimes ===
1. Enrique Gajardo Casales, killed on 5 August 1980 on the El Olivar trail, close to the intersection with the Achupallas pass.
2. Alfredo Sánchez Muñoz, killed on 12 November 1980 in the Estadio Sausalito sector; during the attack, they also raped Sánchez's companion, Fernanda Bohle Basso.
3. Fernando Lagunas Alfaro and Delia González Apablaza, both killed on 28 February 1981 on the Marga Marga estuary.
4. Luis Morales Álvarez, killed on 25 May 1981 on the Camino Granadilla. They also stole Morales' taxi.
5. Jorge Inostroza Letelier, killed on 26 May 1981 in Reñaca; during the attack, they also raped Inostroza's partner Margarita Santibáñez Ibaceta.
6. Raúl Aedo León, killed on 28 July 1981 in the National Botanical Garden of Viña del Mar. They also stole Aedo's taxi.
7. Oscar Noguera Inostroza, killed on 28 July 1981 in Limache; during the attack, they also raped Noguera's partner Ana María Riveros Contreras.
8. Jaime Ventura Córdova and Rosana Venegas Reyes, killed on 1 November 1981 under the Capuchinos Bridge.

=== Investigation ===
There were two parallel investigations during the crime series. One was conducted by the OS7 Department of the Carabineros, which covers Drugs and Narcotics, directed by Mayot Ávila. The other was by a special group of the Investigations Police of Chile (PDI), directed by Commissioner Nelson Lillo.

The key to finding the two murderers was delivered by Corporal Juan Quijada, of the First Commissariat of Viña del Mar, who realized that witnesses described the two men as speaking in an authoritative voice, often used by Chilean policemen. After Sagredo confessed to the crimes, Corporal Quijada denounced him to the OS7 Drug Department.

=== Detention and judicial process ===
The trial of Sagredo and Topp started on 8 March 1982. The two were declared guilty by the Minister in visit, Dinorah Cameratti, on 13 March.

Sagredo and Topp confessed extrajudicially, judicially and publicly to all their crimes. In this way, both were found guilty and sentenced to death, a sentenced first handed down on 8 January 1983 by the minister in visit Julio Torres Allú.

The sentence was confirmed in the second instance by the unanimity of the First Chamber of the Court of Appeals of Valparaíso, composed of the ministers Margarita Osnovikoff, Iris González and Guillermo Navas. The sentence was ratified unanimously by the Third Chamber of the Supreme Court of Chile, consisting of the ministers Osvaldo Erbetta Vaccaro, Emilio Ulloa Muñoz, Abraham Meersohn Schijman and the lawyers Raúl Rencoret Donoso and Cecilli Cáceres, on 17 January 1985.

=== Execution ===
Relatives of the victims, most of whom were leftists who were opposed to the military dictatorship, lobbied against the executions of Sagredo and Topp, since they believed the two men were connected to a higher-ranking death squad. Sagredo said he and Topp had committed some of the murders after being given drugs and promised money by a "crime club" that included a prominent building contractor and five other "executives" who wanted to eliminate political opponents of the Pinochet regime. Only one "executive" was identified: Luis Gubler Diaz, a building contractor and member of a prominent Vina del Mar family. Gubler had close ties with intelligence squads during the violent repression of leftists after the 1973 coup.

An investigation showed that a revolver owned by Gubler was used in four murders. The detective told a court that Gubler confessed to two murders while in custody. However, the detective and the judge hearing the case were later removed. Gubler was freed, and a new judge refused to permit any new evidence against him on the grounds that his confession was made under torture.

However, both men were denied presidential clemency by Augusto Pinochet. The two were executed by firing squad in Quillota on 29 January 1985, as was common at the time. Their hands were tied, they were strapped to chairs, and they had circular red paper targets placed over their hearts.

Sagredo and Topp were the last people to be legally executed in Chile, as the country abolished capital punishment for common offenses in 2001.

== Cultural references ==
- During 2013 and 2014, Canal 13 issued a series called Secretos en el Jardín, inspired by the case.
- The movie Pena de Muerte, released in 2012, retells the story of this case and how it impacted the Chilean population.

== See also ==
- List of serial killers by country
- The Jackal of Nahueltoro, another notable instance of the death penalty being used in Chile
