= 2012 O'Higgins F.C. season =

O'Higgins F.C.
2012 season
- Chairman: (Chile) Ricardo Abumohor
- Manager: (Argentina) Eduardo Berizzo
- Stadium: Estadio El Teniente
- Apertura: Runners-up
- Clausura: 14th
- Copa Chile: Quarterfinals
- Copa Sudamericana: 1st Stage
- Top goalscorer: League: Enzo Gutiérrez and Ramón Fernández (11 goals each); All: Ramón Fernández (13 goals)
- Biggest win: 9–2 vs Deportes Rengo (Friendly, 7 January 2012); 7–0 vs San Antonio Unido (Copa Chile, 10 October 2012)
- Biggest defeat: 0–4 vs Cerro Porteño (Copa Sudamericana, 8 August 2012); 1–5 vs Audax Italiano (Torneo Clausura, 3 November 2012)
Home colours	Away colours

The 2012 O'Higgins F.C. season is O'Higgins F.C.'s 49th season in the Primera División and their sixth consecutive season in Primera División. The club plays in three tournaments: The Primera División de Chile, Copa Sudamericana and the Copa Chile.

== The odissey of Eduardo Berizzo ==
For the 2012 season, the year started of abrupt form with Fernando De la Fuente's departure after a strong discussion with Eduardo Berizzo and also with the goalkeeper's coach Roberto Bonano, being confirmed then that the player will be loaned to Deportes La Serena, losing of this form to one of the best defensive midfielders of the Chilean football for face the Torneo de Apertura. However, the club's board surprised to Rancagua with the signings of the Argentine talented attacking midfielder Ramón Fernández, former footballer of Unión La Calera, who was tempted by country's powerhouse clubs: Colo-Colo and Universidad de Chile, after a very well year, the Paraguayan footballer Rodrigo Rojas, who played for teams like River Plate, and finally to Julio Barroso, defender champion of the 2005 FIFA U-20 World Cup with Argentina that played for Boca Juniors.

On 27 January 2012, the club achieved his first triumph in the Torneo de Apertura against Antofagasta at the Estadio Parque El Teniente with a goal of Ramón Fernández in the 42nd minute, losing at the capital 1–0 with Colo-Colo, the next match. On 25 February, the team achieved his most important victory against Universidad de Chile at Rancagua, with goals of Enzo Gutiérrez, Guillermo Suárez and Fernández, in where Luis Marín saved a penalty to Marcelo Díaz, earning of this form the first place, that lost when Universidad Católica in March defeated 2–1 to the team at El Teniente, then achieving with Julio Barroso and Rodrigo Rojas as the key players, the team achieved four consecutive wins, that finished when Huachipato defeated 2–1 to the club with goals of the striker Manuel Villalobos and the left back José Contreras, but despite the defeat at the city of Talcahuano, the team led by Eduardo Berizzo, after of beat 5–0 to Palestino at Rancagua, on 28 April, more than of one hundred fans traveled for view the qualification of his team to the Copa Sudamericana, after of a 1–0 away victory over Santiago Wanderers with a goal of the midfielder Enzo Gutiérrez at Valparaíso.

On 23 June 2012, after a successful regular phase in the second place under Universidad de Chile at the top of the table, in the playoffs faced to Unión La Calera in the quarterfinals. The first match at La Calera, the team won 1–0 with a free kick goal of Ramón Fernández, who played the last season in that club, not celebrating the goal, in Rancagua for the second match, the club again won, now for a 3–2 victory, thanks to Enzo Gutiérrez, who scored a peace of goal after an incredible bicycle kick that defeated to the keeper Lucas Giovini. The next key, the club faced to Unión Española in the semifinals at Santiago, in where with a goal of the playmaker Emiliano Vecchio the club was defeated at the Estadio Santa Laura, finally winning 2–1 at the second match with goals of Luis Pedro Figueroa and Rodrigo Rojas, whilst for the club of Independencia, scored the striker Sebastián Jaime. The next game, now for the finals against the club Universidad de Chile, O'Higgins beat for the same scored of the last match to the team of the University, with goals of Rojas and the Argentine full back Alejandro López, whilst for the blues scored Guillermo Marino. O'Higgins was the Primera División champion of the Torneo de Apertura, until the 92nd minute of game in the Estadio Nacional, because with annotations of Charles Aránguiz and the same Marino, the club equalized the key, winning 2–0 in the penalties thanks to the blues' keeper Jhonny Herrera, who saved three penalties to Rodrigo Rojas, Yerson Opazo and Enzo Gutiérrez. However, the match was not exempt of polemics, because the referee Enrique Osses conceded a non–existent penalty to Marino, that was scored by Aránguiz, and unfairly red-carded to the centre back Julio Barroso, after an aggression of the right back José Rojas of Universidad de Chile.

== Key Events ==
- 19 December 2011: Eduardo Berizzo joins as the coach of the club.
- 11 January 2012: Sebastián Pinto joins Bursaspor.
- 28 April 2012: The club qualified to the Copa Sudamericana.
- 2 July 2012: The club is the runner-up of the Primera División de Chile.

== Current squad ==
Note: Flags indicate national team as defined under FIFA eligibility rules; some limited exceptions apply. Players may hold more than one non-FIFA nationality. Squad correct as of 28 July 2012.

No.	Pos.	Nation	Player
1	GK	CHI	Roberto González
25	GK	CHI	Eduardo Miranda
31	GK	CHI	Luis Marín (captain)
2	DF	CHI	René Bugueño
3	DF	CHI	Nélson Saavedra
4	DF	CHI	Benjamín Vidal
5	DF	ARG	Julio Barroso
8	DF	CHI	Yerson Opazo
13	DF	CHI	Nelson Rebolledo (on loan from Universidad de Chile)
17	DF	CHI	Luis Casanova
24	DF	ARG	Eduardo Alejandro López
10	MF	ARG	Ramón Fernández
11	MF	CHI	Luis Pedro Figueroa
15	MF	CHI	César Fuentes
16	MF	CHI	Claudio Meneses
18	MF	CHI	José Luis Silva (on loan from Universidad de Chile)
20	MF	PAR	Rodrigo Rojas
21	MF	CHI	Boris Sagredo
26	MF	CHI	Diego González
27	MF	CHI	Nicolás Vargas
28	MF	CHI	Sebastián Céspedes
7	FW	COL	Marco Pérez
9	FW	VEN	Richard Blanco
14	FW	CHI	Carlos Ross (on loan from Audax Italiano)
19	FW	CHI	Carlos Escobar
22	FW	CHI	Henry Calderón
33	FW	CHI	Juan Pablo Carrasco

== Transfers ==
=== Apertura 2012 ===
Actualized as February 17, 2012

==== In ====
#	Pos	Player	From	Type
	MAN	(Argentina) Eduardo Berizzo	Free Agent	Free
	FW	(Argentina) Juan Ignacio Molinelli	(Argentina) UAI Urquiza	Trial
26	MF	(Chile) Diego González Reyes	(Chile) Deportes Puerto Montt	Loan Return
4	DF	(Chile) Benjamín Vidal	(Chile) Deportes Puerto Montt	Loan Return
	GK	(Chile) Rodrigo Flores	(Chile) Unión La Calera	Loan Return
14	MF	(Argentina) Ramón Fernández	(Chile) Unión La Calera	Transfer
5	DF	(Argentina) Julio Barroso	(Chile) Ñublense	Loan
11	MF	(Chile) Luis Pedro Figueroa	(Portugal) S.C. Olhanense	Transfer
19	FW	(Chile) Carlos Escobar	(Chile) Coquimbo Unido	Transfer
3	DF	(Chile) Nélson Saavedra	(Chile) Unión San Felipe	Transfer
13	MF	(Chile) Nelson Rebolledo	Universidad de Chile	Loan
20	MF	(Paraguay) Rodrigo Rojas	(Belgium) Beerschot AC	Transfer
16	MF	(Chile) Claudio Meneses	(Chile) Deportes La Serena	Transfer
22	FW	(Venezuela) Richard Blanco	(Venezuela) Deportivo Petare	Transfer

==== Out ====
#	Pos	Player	To	Type
2	MF	(Chile) Juan Luis González	(Chile) Deportes Antofagasta	Transfer
	MAN	(Chile) José Cantillana	Free Agent	Contract Terminated
3	DF	(Chile) Cristián Oviedo	(Chile) Audax Italiano	Transfer
4	DF	(Chile) Nicolás Larrondo	(Chile) Rangers de Talca	Transfer
6	DF	(Chile) Mauricio Arias	(Chile) Audax Italiano	Loan from Universidad de Chile
8	MF	(Argentina) Miguel Ángel González	(Chile) Colo-Colo	Loan from Unión San Felipe
11	FW	(Chile) Juan Gonzalo Lorca	(Chile) Santiago Wanderers	Loan from US Boulogne
28	MF	(Argentina) Federico Sardella	(Chile) Deportes Puerto Montt	Transfer
15	MF	(Chile) Esteban Carvajal	(Chile) Unión San Felipe	Loan Return
14	FW	(Chile) Juan Pablo Carrasco	(Chile) Deportes Puerto Montt	Loan
19	FW	(Chile) Sebastián Pinto	(Turkey) Bursaspor	Transfer
27	MF	(Argentina) Ezequiel Lazo	(Argentina) Defensores de Belgrano	Loan Return
22	MF	(Argentina) Fernando de la Fuente	(Chile) Deportes La Serena	Loan
32	FW	(Argentina) Milton Alegre	(Chile) Deportes Concepción	Loan
	GK	(Chile) Rodrigo Flores	(Chile) Unión Temuco	Loan
	MF	(Chile) Braulio Baeza	(Chile) Unión Temuco	Loan
	MF	(Chile) Leonardo Saavedra	(Chile) Deportes Antofagasta	Loan

== Club ==
=== Technical staff ===
Position	Staff
Head coach	(Argentina) Eduardo Berizzo
Assistant coach	(Argentina) Roberto Bonano
Goalkeeper coach	(Argentina) Carlos Kisluk
Trainer	(Argentina) Ernesto Marcucci
Trainer	(Argentina) Pablo Fernández
Physiotherapist	(Chile) Marcelo Sepúlveda
Paramedic	(Chile) Luis Salazar
Physician	(Chile) Eduardo Urrutia
Stagehand	(Chile) Raúl Venegas
Stagehand	(Chile) Andrés Rojas
Field Assistant	(Chile) Pablo Pinto
Coordinator	(Chile) Juan Camilla

=== Kit ===
Diadora were announced as O'Higgins' kit supplier as of the start of the season. The new kit was presented on 21 January 2012, during the Noche Celeste match against Alianza Lima.
Supplier: (Italy) Diadora
Sponsor(s): (Chile) Agrosuper, (Chile) Codelco, (Chile) Entel, (Chile) Essbio (back), (Chile) Clínica Integral (sleeves), (Chile) Sodimac (shorts), (Chile) Clos de Pirque (socks)

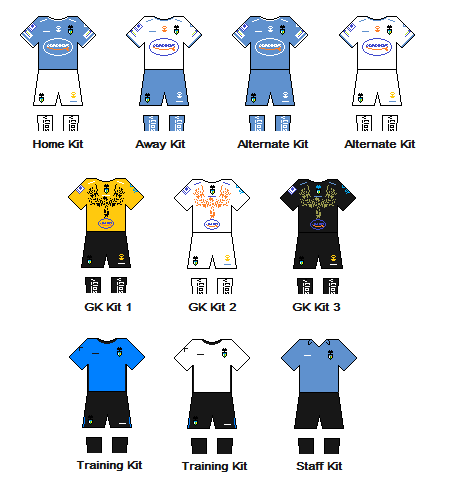

Last updated: 20 January 2012.
Source: O'Higgins F.C.

=== Other information ===
Chairman	(Chile) Ricardo Abumohor
Ground (capacity and dimensions)	Estadio El Teniente (14,450 / 105x68 metres)

Updated to match played 20 January 2012
Source: O'Higgins F.C.

== Season results ==
=== Apertura 2012 ===
==== Classification ====
Pos	Team	Pld	W	D	L	GF	GA	GD	Pts	Qualification
1	Universidad de Chile	17	13	1	3	44	14	+30	40	Playoffs
2	O'Higgins	17	11	2	4	31	15	+16	35	Playoffs & 2012 Copa Sudamericana First Stage (Note: O'Higgins and Deportes Iquique qualified for the 2012 Copa Sudamericana as the top two teams not playing in the 2012 Copa Libertadores Second Stage.)
3	Deportes Iquique	17	10	5	2	30	14	+16	35	Playoffs & 2012 Copa Sudamericana First Stage
4	Universidad Católica	17	8	6	3	31	17	+14	30	Playoffs
5	Unión Española	17	8	3	6	38	28	+10	27	Playoffs

Source: Asociación Nacional de Fútbol Profesional
Rules for classification: 1st points; 2nd wins; 3rd goal difference; 4th goals scored; 5th away goals; 6th red cards; 7th yellow cards; 8th draw.
Notes:

Pos	Team	Pld	W	D	L	GF	GA	GD	Pts
12	Cobreloa	17	6	2	9	23	24	−1	20
13	Deportes Antofagasta	17	6	2	9	26	29	−3	20
14	O'Higgins	17	5	5	7	22	27	−5	20
15	Santiago Wanderers	17	4	7	6	27	28	−1	19
16	Universidad de Concepción	17	3	6	8	17	28	−11	15

Source: Asociación Nacional de Fútbol Profesional
Rules for classification: 1st points; 2nd wins; 3rd goal difference; 4th goals scored; 5th away goals; 6th red cards; 7th yellow cards; 8th draw.

==== Results summary ====
Overall								Home						Away					
Pld	W	D	L	GF	GA	GD	Pts	W	D	L	GF	GA	GD	W	D	L	GF	GA	GD
17	11	2	4	31	15	+16	35	6	1	1	19	7	+12	5	1	3	12	8	+4

Last updated: 3 March 2012.
Source: ANFP - Primera División

=== Clausura 2012 ===
==== Classification ====
Pos	Team	Pld	W	D	L	GF	GA	GD	Pts	Qualification
1	Universidad de Chile	17	13	1	3	44	14	+30	40	Playoffs
2	O'Higgins	17	11	2	4	31	15	+16	35	Playoffs & 2012 Copa Sudamericana First Stage (Note: O'Higgins and Deportes Iquique qualified for the 2012 Copa Sudamericana as the top two teams not playing in the 2012 Copa Libertadores Second Stage.)
3	Deportes Iquique	17	10	5	2	30	14	+16	35	Playoffs & 2012 Copa Sudamericana First Stage
4	Universidad Católica	17	8	6	3	31	17	+14	30	Playoffs
5	Unión Española	17	8	3	6	38	28	+10	27	Playoffs

Source: Asociación Nacional de Fútbol Profesional
Rules for classification: 1st points; 2nd wins; 3rd goal difference; 4th goals scored; 5th away goals; 6th red cards; 7th yellow cards; 8th draw.
Notes:

Pos	Team	Pld	W	D	L	GF	GA	GD	Pts
12	Cobreloa	17	6	2	9	23	24	−1	20
13	Deportes Antofagasta	17	6	2	9	26	29	−3	20
14	O'Higgins	17	5	5	7	22	27	−5	20
15	Santiago Wanderers	17	4	7	6	27	28	−1	19
16	Universidad de Concepción	17	3	6	8	17	28	−11	15

Source: Asociación Nacional de Fútbol Profesional
Rules for classification: 1st points; 2nd wins; 3rd goal difference; 4th goals scored; 5th away goals; 6th red cards; 7th yellow cards; 8th draw.

==== Results summary ====
Overall								Home						Away					
Pld	W	D	L	GF	GA	GD	Pts	W	D	L	GF	GA	GD	W	D	L	GF	GA	GD
17	5	5	7	22	27	−5	20	3	2	4	13	14	−1	2	3	3	9	13	−4

Last updated: 14 November 2012.
Source: ANFP - Primera División

=== Competitive ===
==== Pre-season ====
4 January 2012 Friendly	O'Higgins	2 – 0	Enfoque	Rancagua
18:00	González; Alegre	Report		Stadium: La Gamboína; Attendance: 100

7 January 2012 Friendly	O'Higgins	9 – 2	Rengo	Rancagua
10:00	Sebastián Pinto; Benjamín Vidal; Boris Sagredo; Guillermo Suárez; Fernando de la Fuente; Gonzalo Villegas; Samuel Teuber; Milton Alegre		Unknown	Stadium: La Gamboína; Attendance: 100

11 January 2012 Noche Albirroja	Curicó Unido	0 – 3	O'Higgins	Curicó
20:30		Report	Enzo Gutiérrez; Fernando de la Fuente; Milton Alegre	Stadium: La Granja

14 January 2012 Friendly	O'Higgins	1 – 2	Rangers	Rancagua
18:40	Boris Sagredo 19'	Report	Mauricio Gómez 60'; José Luis Silva 75'	Stadium: La Gamboína; Attendance: 200

18 January 2012 Friendly	O'Higgins	1 – 2	Audax Italiano	Rancagua
18:00	Luis Pedro Figueroa	Report	Sebastián Silva; Camilo Melivilu	Stadium: La Gamboína; Attendance: 200

==== Noche Celeste ====
21 January 2012 Friendly	O'Higgins	1 – 1	(Peru) Alianza Lima	Rancagua
20:15	Teuber 30'	Report	Soto 89'	Stadium: El Teniente; Attendance: 8,000

==== Apertura 2012 ====
27 January 2012 Week 1	O'Higgins	1 – 0	Deportes Antofagasta	Rancagua
20:00	Ramón Fernández 42'	Report		Stadium: El Teniente; Attendance: 3,573; Referee: Manuel Acosta

4 February 2012 Week 2	Colo-Colo	1 – 0	O'Higgins	Santiago
20:30	Rodrigo Millar 46'	Report		Stadium: Monumental; Attendance: 18,000; Referee: Patricio Polic

12 February 2012 Week 3	Unión Española	0 – 2	O'Higgins	Santiago
20:30	Marco Hidalgo (yellow card) 60'; Madrid (red card) 86'	Report	López (yellow card) 22'; Fernández 62'; Claudio Meneses (yellow card) 65' (yellow-red card) 82'; Figueroa 69'	Stadium: Santa Laura; Attendance: 2,069; Referee: Roberto Tobar

18 February 2012 Week 4	Deportes La Serena	2 – 2	O'Higgins	La Serena, Chile
20:30	Jerez (yellow card) 11'; Fernández (yellow card) 36' (goal) 64'; Vargas (yellow card) 38'; Salazar 51'	Summary	Rebolledo (yellow card) 17'; López (yellow card) 26'; Gutiérrez 35'; Opazo (red card) 82'; Figueroa (yellow card) 83'; Fernández (yellow card) 84'; Suárez (red card) 85'; Rojas 88'	Stadium: Estadio La Portada; Attendance: 3,286; Referee: Cristian Andaur

25 February 2012 Week 5	O'Higgins	3 – 0	Club Universidad de Chile	Rancagua, Chile
16:00	Casanova (yellow card) 19'; Fernández (yellow card) 33' (goal) 58'; Gutiérrez 35'; Suárez 49' (pen.) (yellow card) 51'; Rebolledo (yellow card) 70'	Summary	Fernándes (yellow card) 18'; Rojas (yellow card) 48'; Rodríguez (yellow card) 49'; González (yellow card) 51'	Stadium: Estadio El Teniente; Attendance: 6,974; Referee: Eduardo Gamboa

3 March 2012 Week 6	Universidad de Concepción	1 – 3	O'Higgins	Concepción, Chile
16:00	González (yellow card) 21'; Britez (yellow card) 54'; Jayson Mena 65'	Summary	Suárez (yellow card) 34' (goal) 56' (pen.); López (yellow card) 62'; Claudio Meneses (yellow card) 73'; González 79' (yellow card) 80'; Rojas 90+3'	Stadium: Estadio Municipal de Concepción; Attendance: 1,800; Referee: Julio Bascuñán

11 March 2012 Week 7	O'Higgins	1 – 2	Universidad Católica	Rancagua, Chile
16:00	Fernández (yellow card) 1'; Rebolledo (yellow card) 21'; López (yellow card) 35'; Gutiérrez 56'; Sagredo (yellow card) 57'	Summary	Gutiérrez 12'; Valenzuela (yellow card) 15'; Silva (yellow card) 39'; Ovelar 89'	Stadium: Estadio El Teniente; Attendance: 9,485; Referee: Patrico Polic

17 March 2012 Week 8	Deportes Iquique	1 – 2	O'Higgins	Iquique
16:00	Toro (yellow card) 38'; Rieloff 76'; Taucare (yellow card) 80'	Summary	Rojas (yellow card) 44'; Gutiérrez 51'; Saavedra (yellow card) 60'; Casanova (yellow card) 64'; Blanco 79' (yellow card) 82' (yellow-red card) 84'	Stadium: Estadio Tierra de Campeones; Attendance: 4,651; Referee: Claudio Fuenzalida

24 March 2012 Week 9	O'Higgins	2 – 1	Unión La Calera	Rancagua, Chile
16:00	Suárez (yellow card) 4'; Gutiérrez 20'; Opazo (yellow card) 27'; Claudio Meneses (yellow card) 28'; Teuber 83'	Summary	Carreño (yellow card) 5'; Cellerino (yellow card) 25' (yellow-red card) 82' (goal) 69'; Suárez (yellow card) 42'; Nicolás Ortiz (yellow card) 80' (yellow-red card) 90'; Simón (yellow card) 88'	Stadium: Estadio El Teniente; Attendance: 4,907; Referee: Rene De La Rosa

1 April 2012 Week 10	Cobreloa	0 – 1	O'Higgins	Calama, Chile
17:00	Muñoz (yellow card) 15'; Jerez (yellow card) 24'	Summary	Fernández (yellow card) 26' (goal) 56'; Claudio Meneses (yellow card) 35'	Stadium: Estadio Municipal de Calama; Attendance: 3,440; Referee: Manuel Acosta

7 April 2012 Week 11	O'Higgins	2 – 1	Unión San Felipe	Rancagua, Chile
17:00	Figueroa 23'; Opazo 55' (yellow card) 84'; Rojas (yellow card) 66'; Suárez (yellow card) 81'	Summary	Sergio Núñez (yellow card) 7'; Vranjicán 32'; Virviescas (yellow card) 42'; Acuña (yellow card) 56'	Stadium: Estadio El Teniente; Attendance: 6,187; Referee: Miquwl Garcia

15 April 2012 Week 12	Huachipato	2 – 1	O'Higgins	Talcahuano
17:00	Villalobos 23' (yellow card) 30'; Contreras 48'; Reyes (yellow card) 85'	Summary	Fernández (yellow card) 13'; Rojas 34'; López (yellow card) 55'; Figueroa (yellow card) 90+2'	Stadium: Estadio CAP; Attendance: 3,398; Referee: Claudio Puga

21 April 2012 Week 13	O'Higgins	5 – 0	Palestino	Rancagua, Chile
17:00	Fernández 9'; Marín (yellow card) 24'; Rojas 27'; Gutiérrez 54'; Blanco (yellow card) 67' (goal) 75'; Carlos Escobar 90+2'	Summary	Canales (yellow card) 18'; Henríquez (yellow card) 45'; Flores (yellow card) 51'; Martínez (yellow card) 61'; Ávalos (yellow card) 88'; Carlos Alberto Pérez (yellow card) 89'	Stadium: Estadio El Teniente; Attendance: 4,327; Referee: Carlos Rumiano

28 April 2012 Week 14	Santiago Wanderers	0 – 1	O'Higgins	Valparaíso
20:30		Report	Meneses (yellow card) 18' (yellow-red card) 64'; Saavedra (yellow card) 44'; Gutiérrez 63'; Figueroa (yellow card) 77'; López (yellow card) 83'	Stadium: Estadio Regional Chiledeportes; Attendance: 6,811; Referee: Enrique Osses

6 May 2012 Week 15	O'Higgins	2 – 2	Rangers	Rancagua, Chile
15:00	Gutiérrez 26' (yellow card) 41'; Fernández (yellow card) 40' (goal) 79'	Report	Capelli (red card) 45'; Caraglio 60'; Reynero 78'	Stadium: Estadio El Teniente; Attendance: 9,284; Referee: Eduardo Gamboa

13 May 2012 Week 16	O'Higgins	3 – 1	Audax Italiano	Rancagua, Chile
17:30	Meneses (yellow card) 37'; Casanova (yellow card) 45+1'; Suárez 48' (pen.); Rojas 54'; Figueroa 83'	Report	Sánchez (yellow card) 46'; Canuhé (yellow card) 57'; Malano 66'	Stadium: Estadio El Teniente; Attendance: 5,598; Referee: Julio Bascuñán

20 May 2012 Week 17	Cobresal	1 – 0	O'Higgins	El Salvador, Chile
15:00	Cabión (yellow card) 1'; Cuéllar 53' (pen.); Pavez (yellow card) 78'	Report	González (yellow card) 47'	Stadium: Estadio El Cobre de El Salvador; Attendance: 557; Referee: Cristian Andaur

===== Play-offs =====
Quarterfinals
1	Universidad de Chile	2	2	4
8	Cobreloa	0	1	1
3	Iquique	3	1	4
6	Colo-Colo	3	2	5
4	Universidad Católica	0	1	1
5	Unión Española	3	1	4
2	O'Higgins	1	3	4
7	Unión La Calera	0	2	2

Semifinals
1	Universidad de Chile	0	4	4
6	Colo-Colo	2	0	2
5	Unión Española	1	1	2
2	O'Higgins	0	2	2

Final
1	Universidad de Chile (p)	1	2	3 (2)
3	O'Higgins	2	1	3 (0)

===== Quarterfinals =====
24 May 2012
19:00

Unión La Calera	0–1	O'Higgins
	Report	Fernández 74'

Estadio Nicolás Chahuán, La Calera
Attendance: 2.790
Referee: Jorge Osorio

27 May 2012
18:30

O'Higgins	3–2	Unión La Calera
Gutiérrez 52', 56', 83'	Report	Valencia 53'; Bahamondes 89'

Estadio El Teniente, Rancagua
Attendance: 3,764
Referee: Eduardo Gamboa

O'Higgins won 4–2 on aggregate.

===== Semifinals =====
16 June 2012
21:00

Unión Española	1–0	O'Higgins
Vecchio 36'	Report

Estadio Santa Laura, Independencia, Santiago
Attendance: 7,025
Referee: Jorge Osorio

23 June 2012
16:00

O'Higgins	2–1	Unión Española
Figueroa 13'; Rojas 59'	Report	Jaime 50'

Estadio El Teniente, Rancagua
Attendance: 10,097
Referee: Patricio Polic

2–2 on aggregate. O'Higgins won due to its position at the regular season (O'Higgins: 2nd, Unión Española: 5th)

===== Final =====
28 June 2012
16:00

O'Higgins	2–1	Universidad de Chile
Rojas 1'; López 71'	Report	Marino 28'

Estadio El Teniente, Rancagua
Attendance: 11,500
Referee: Jorge Osorio

2 July 2012
15:30

Universidad de Chile	2–1	O'Higgins
Aránguiz 66'; Marino 90+2'	Report	Fernández 30'
Penalties
Aránguiz (penalty scored); Díaz (penalty missed); Ruidíaz (penalty scored)	2–0	(penalty missed) Rojas; (penalty missed) Suárez; (penalty missed) Opazo; (penalty missed) Gutiérrez

Estadio Nacional, Ñuñoa, Santiago
Attendance: 44,198
Referee: Enrique Osses

3–3 on aggregate. Universidad de Chile won 2–0 on penalties.

==== Clausura 2012 ====
15 July 2012 Week 2	O'Higgins	1–1	Colo-Colo	Rancagua
16:00	Blanco 9'	Report	Muñoz 6' (pen.)	Stadium: El Teniente; Attendance: 8,647; Referee: Jorge Osorio

21 July 2012 Week 3	O'Higgins	1–3	Unión Española	Rancagua
12:30	Blanco 35'	Report	Rubio 25'; Scotti 55'; Jaime 59'; Leal (red card) 80'	Stadium: El Teniente; Attendance: 3,933; Referee: Roberto Tobar

29 July 2012 Week 4	O'Higgins	2–1	Deportes La Serena	Rancagua
18:30	Blanco 71'; Escobar 87'	Report	Salazar 64'	Stadium: El Teniente; Attendance: 3,148; Referee: Eduardo Gamboa

12 August 2012 Week 6	O'Higgins	4–1	Universidad de Concepción	Rancagua
15:30	González 1' (o.g.); Blanco 7'; Sagredo 67'; Pérez 75'	Report	R. Ramos 79'	Stadium: El Teniente; Attendance: 2,504; Referee: Manuel Acosta

15 August 2012 Week 1(*)	Deportes Antofagasta	2–3	O'Higgins	Antofagasta
12:00	Elizondo 65' (red card) 90+1'; Pino 75' (pen.)	Report	Escobar 3'; Sagredo 45+1'; Fernández 90+3'	Stadium: Parque Juan López; Attendance: 2,000; Referee: Claudio Fuenzalida
Note: The match was originally scheduled between 6 and 8 July, but was postponed in order to give O'Higgins recovery time after the Apertura Final, played on 2 July.

19 August 2012 Week 7	Universidad Católica	1–0	O'Higgins	Las Condes, Santiago
18:30	Á. Ramos 42'; Sepúlveda (red card) 85'	Report		Stadium: San Carlos de Apoquindo; Attendance: 7,826; Referee: Claudio Puga

25 August 2012 Week 8	O'Higgins	0–1	Deportes Iquique	Rancagua
18:15		Report	Rieloff 71'	Stadium: El Teniente; Attendance: 3,875; Referee: Julio Bascuñán

29 August 2012 Week 5(*)	Universidad de Chile	1–1	O'Higgins	Independencia, Santiago
20:00	E. Gutiérrez 12'	Report	Barroso 43'; Opazo (red card) 83'	Stadium: Santa Laura; Attendance: 4,599; Referee: Roberto Tobar
Note: The match was originally scheduled between 3 and 5 August, but was postponed in order to allow O'Higgins to play against Cerro Porteño at the Copa Sudamericana (8 August).

2 September 2012 Week 9	Unión La Calera	0–0	O'Higgins	La Calera
16:00		Report		Stadium: Nicolás Chahuán; Attendance: 1,364; Referee: Roberto Tobar

15 September 2012 Week 10	O'Higgins	1–0	Cobreloa	Rancagua
18:15	Blanco 9'	Report	Muñoz (red card) 79'	Stadium: El Teniente; Attendance: 3,653; Referee: Carlos Ulloa

22 September 2012 Week 11	Unión San Felipe	1–1	O'Higgins	San Felipe
20:30	Grbec 81'	Report	Blanco 23'; Rojas (red card) 73'	Stadium: Municipal; Attendance: 1,882; Referee: Claudio Fuenzalida

28 September 2012 Week 12	O'Higgins	2–4	Huachipato	Rancagua
20:00	Blanco 36'; Pérez 40'	Report	Sandoval 4'; Opazo 15' (o.g.); B. Rodríguez 25'; Villalobos 74'	Stadium: El Teniente; Attendance: 3,803; Referee: Carlos Rumiano

6 October 2012 Week 13	Palestino	2–1	O'Higgins	La Cisterna, Santiago
12:30	Cháves 47', 75'	Report	Sagredo 26'	Stadium: Municipal; Attendance: 1,729; Referee: Claudio Aranda

20 October 2012 Week 14	O'Higgins	1–1	Santiago Wanderers	Rancagua
20:30	Fernández 1'	Report	Ormeño 66'; Parra (red card) 83'	Stadium: El Teniente; Attendance: 5,303; Referee: Claudio Puga

27 October 2012 Week 15	Rangers	1–2	O'Higgins	Talca
12:00	Oroz 90'	Report	Fernández 1'; Sagredo 47'	Stadium: Fiscal; Attendance: 5,966; Referee: Álvaro García

3 November 2012 Week 16	Audax Italiano	5–1	O'Higgins	La Florida, Santiago
20:30	Medel 12'; Sáez 45+1', 72'; G. Rodríguez 65'; Barroso 79' (o.g.)	Report	Fernández 62'	Stadium: Bicentenario; Attendance: 4,897; Referee: Cristián Andaúr

14 November 2012 Week 17	O'Higgins	1–2	Cobresal	Rancagua
20:00	Sagredo 62'	Report	P. Gutiérrez 7'; Galeano 67'	Stadium: El Teniente; Attendance: 4,539; Referee: Julio Bascuñán

==== Copa Sudamericana ====
O'Higgins play against Cerro Porteño of Paraguay. In the first match the team draw 3-3, but with a negative point for the away goals rule. In the second match, played in Paraguay, the club lose 4–0, Cerro Porteño won on points 4–1, and O'Higgins is eliminated of the tournament.

===== Match G8 =====
26 July 2012
20:30 UTC−4
1st Leg

O'Higgins (Chile)	3–3	(Paraguay) Cerro Porteño
Blanco 10', 90'; Barroso (yellow card) 21'; Fernández 78'	Report	Bonet 25' dos Santos (yellow card) 31'; López (yellow card) 40' (goal) 86'; Oviedo (yellow card) 45'; Benítez (yellow card) 55'; Fabbro 71'; Da Silva (yellow card) 90+3'

Estadio El Teniente, Rancagua
Attendance: 10,367
Referee: Patricio Loustau (Argentina)

8 August 2012
20:45 UTC−4
2nd Leg

Cerro Porteño (Paraguay)	4–0	(Chile) O'Higgins
Fabbro 14'; Oviedo 15'; Salcedo 73'; Da Silva 90'	Report	Fernández (yellow card) 10'; Opazo (yellow card) 34'; Figueroa (yellow card) 36'; Saavedra (yellow card) 56' (yellow-red card) 63'; Sagredo (yellow card) 62'; Rojas (yellow card) 82'

Estadio General Pablo Rojas, Asunción
Attendance: 34,680
Referee: Martín Vázquez (Uruguay)

Cerro Porteño won on points 4–1.

==== Copa Chile ====
===== Group 3 =====
Team	Pld	W	D	L	GF	GA	GD	Pts	OHIG	RANG	DCOL	SANU
O'Higgins	6	4	1	1	15	4	+11	13		0–1	1–1	7–0
Rangers	6	3	1	2	8	7	+1	10	1–3		1–1	3–1
Deportes Colchagua	6	2	3	1	7	5	+2	9	0–2	2–0		2–0
San Antonio Unido	6	0	1	5	3	17	−14	1	1–2	0–2	1–1	

Legend: Blue = home team win; Yellow = draw; Red = away team win.
