= O'Higgins vs Universidad de Chile (2012 Apertura Final first leg) =

La tarde de los paraguas felices
- Event: 2012 Apertura Final (First leg)
O'Higgins	Universidad de Chile
2	1
- Date: 28 June 2012
- Venue: Estadio El Teniente, Rancagua
- CDF Man of the Match: Luis Pedro Figueroa
- Easy Man of the Match: Luis Pedro Figueroa
- Referee: Jorge Osorio
- Attendance: 10,000
- Weather: Rainy; 11 °C (52 °F)

The first leg of 2012 Apertura Final also known as La tarde de los paraguas felices (The evening of happy umbrellas) was the first leg of the matches that chose the champion of the Torneo de Apertura 2012 of Chile.

In the match, O'Higgins faced Universidad de Chile at the Estadio El Teniente, winning the home club 2:1 with goals of Juan Rodrigo Rojas and Alejandro López. The goal for the away team was scored by Guillermo Marino.

== Road to the final ==
=== Classification stage ===
The Classification Stage began in January and ended in July.

==== Standings ====
Pos	Team	Pld	W	D	L	GF	GA	GD	Pts	Qualification
1	Universidad de Chile	17	13	1	3	44	14	+30	40	Playoffs
2	O'Higgins	17	11	2	4	31	15	+16	35	Playoffs
3	Iquique	17	10	5	2	30	14	+16	35	Playoffs
4	Universidad Católica	17	8	6	3	31	17	+14	30	Playoffs
5	Unión Española	17	8	3	6	38	28	+10	27	Playoffs
6	Colo-Colo	17	7	5	5	22	21	+1	26	Playoffs
7	Unión La Calera	17	6	6	5	21	18	+3	24	Playoffs
8	Cobreloa	17	7	2	8	23	25	−2	23	Playoffs

Source: Asociación Nacional de Fútbol Profesional
Rules for classification: 1st points; 2nd wins; 3rd goal difference; 4th goals scored; 5th away goals; 6th red cards; 7th yellow cards; 8th draw.

=== Playoff stage ===
For all ties, the lower-seeded team play the first leg at home.

Quarterfinals
1	Universidad de Chile	2	2	4
8	Cobreloa	0	1	1
3	Iquique	3	1	4
6	Colo-Colo	3	2	5
4	Universidad Católica	0	1	1
5	Unión Española	3	1	4
2	O'Higgins	1	3	4
7	Unión La Calera	0	2	2

Semifinals
1	Universidad de Chile	0	4	4
6	Colo-Colo	2	0	2
5	Unión Española	1	1	2
2	O'Higgins	0	2	2

Final
1	Universidad de Chile	1
2	O'Higgins	2

== Details ==
28 June 2012
16:00

O'Higgins	2–1	Universidad de Chile
Rojas 1'; López 71'	Report	Marino 28'

Estadio El Teniente, Rancagua
Attendance: 10,000
Referee: Jorge Osorio

GK	31	(Chile) Luis Marín (c)
DF	5	(Argentina) Julio Barroso
DF	3	(Chile) Nélson Saavedra
DF	8	(Chile) Yerson Opazo
DF	24	(Argentina) Alejandro López
MF	11	(Chile) Luis Pedro Figueroa	(substituted off) 87'
MF	21	(Chile) Boris Sagredo	(substituted off) 75'
MF	20	(Paraguay) Rodrigo Rojas
MF	14	(Argentina) Ramón Fernández	(substituted off) 90+1'
MF	16	(Chile) Claudio Meneses
FW	10	(Argentina) Enzo Gutiérrez
Substitutes:
GK	1	(Chile) Roberto González
DF	17	(Chile) Luis Casanova
DF	13	(Chile) Nelson Rebolledo	(substituted on) 87'
MF	15	(Chile) César Fuentes	(substituted on) 75'
MF	7	(Argentina) Guillermo Suárez	(substituted on) 90+1'
FW	9	(Venezuela) Richard Blanco
FW	19	(Chile) Samuel Teuber
Manager:
(Argentina) Eduardo Berizzo

GK	25	(Chile) Johnny Herrera
DF	14	(Chile) Paulo Magalhães
DF	4	(Chile) Osvaldo González
DF	13	(Chile) José Rojas (c)
DF	3	(Chile) Eugenio Mena
MF	8	(Argentina) Guillermo Marino	(yellow card) 54'
MF	6	(Argentina) Matías Rodríguez
MF	21	(Chile) Marcelo Díaz
MF	20	(Chile) Charles Aránguiz
FW	9	(Chile) Júnior Fernándes
FW	7	(Chile) Ángelo Henríquez		(substituted off) 65'
Substitutes:
GK	12	(Chile) Paulo Garcés
DF	15	(Chile) Roberto Cereceda
DF	24	(Chile) Igor Lichnovsky
MF	10	(Chile) Pedro Morales
MF	23	(Chile) Sebastián Martínez
FW	17	(Peru) Raúl Ruidíaz
FW	18	(Chile) Felipe Gallegos		(substituted on) 65'
Manager:
(Argentina) Jorge Sampaoli

Man of the Match:
Luis Pedro Figueroa (O'Higgins)

Assistant referees:
Juan Maturana
Julio Díaz
Fourth official:
Eduardo Gamboa

Match rules:

- 90 minutes.
- Away goals rule does not apply for Leg 2.
- Seven named eligible substitutes.
- Maximum of three substitutions.
