= 2013–14 Súper Final Apertura =

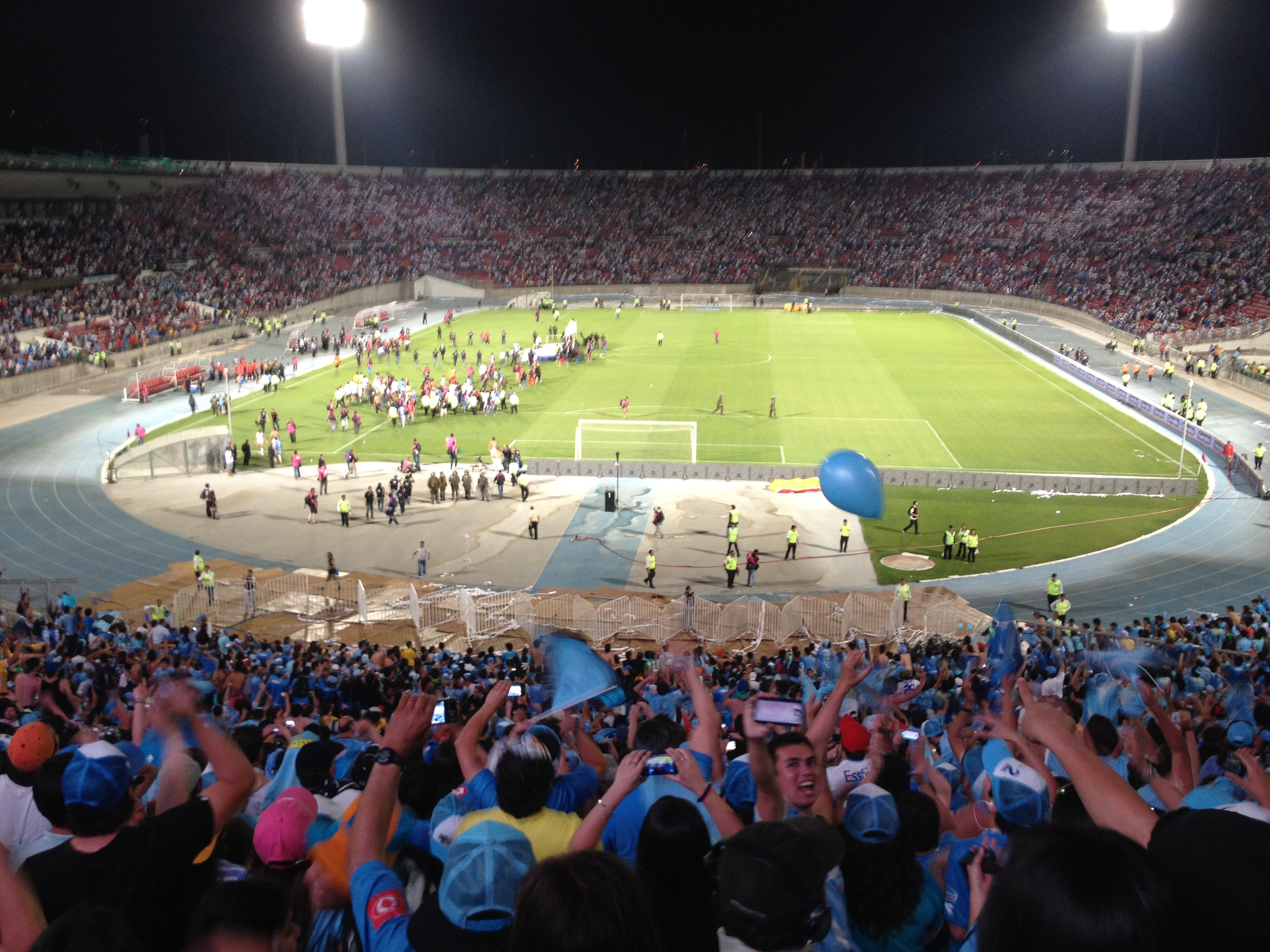
- Event: Súper Final Torneo Apertura 2013–14
Universidad Católica	O'Higgins
0	1
- Date: 10 December 2013
- Venue: Estadio Nacional, Santiago
- CDF Man of the Match: Paulo Garcés
- Easy Man of the Match: Paulo Garcés
- Referee: Jorge Osorio
- Attendance: 40,000
- Weather: Clear; 32 °C (90 °F)

The 2013–14 Súper Final Apertura was the final game that determined the champion of the Torneo de Apertura 2013-14 of Chile.

Universidad Católica played against O'Higgins, both teams arrived with the same number of points to the last match-day of the championship. The match was played on 10 December 2013, at the Estadio Nacional de Chile.

Was the first tiebreaker match or Súper Final in the Primera División de Chile history. In which, O'Higgins reached its first championship by winning 0:1, with a goal of the Argentine-Chilean Pablo Hernández.

== Match ==
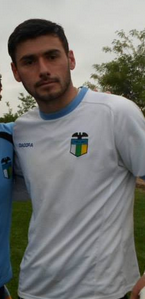
Paulo Garcés was chosen as the Man of the match.

After a hard-fought championship title fight against Universidad Católica, both ended up the tournament tied on 39 points, forcing a tiebreaker match, after an amendment to the rules of the championship was made. Modifying the rule that the team who had a better goal difference if both teams had the same number of points would be crowned as the champion.

The match was played at the Estadio Nacional de Chile as a neutral pitch, and the referee chosen for the match was Jorge Osorio.

The match was played on December 10, 2013, with a crowded Estadio Nacional de Chile that witnessed O'Higgins winning its championship in history with a goal of one of its main players Pablo Hernández, who ultimately ended up in club history.

== Road to the final ==
Note: In all results below, the score of the finalist is given first (H: home; A: away). These results only considered the regular phase of the tournament (round robin), consisting of 17 matchdays played since 26 July until 8 December 2013.

Universidad Católica		Campeonato Nacional	O'Higgins	
Opponent	Result	Round robin	Opponent	Result
Ñublense	3-0 (H)	Matchday 1	Deportes Iquique	1-0 (A)
Unión Española	1-0 (A)	Matchday 2	Antofagasta	2-1 (H)
Universidad de Concepción	1-1 (H)	Matchday 3	Audax Italiano	1-1 (A)
Audax Italiano	1-1 (H)	Matchday 4	Everton	1-1 (H)
Palestino	6-3 (A)	Matchday 5	Santiago Wanderers	3-0 (A) ^{[note]}
Cobresal	3-0 (H)	Matchday 6	Palestino	0-1 (H)
Huachipato	4-0 (A)	Matchday 7	Ñublense	1-0 (H)
O'Higgins	1-2 (H)	Matchday 8	Universidad Católica	2-1 (A)
Deportes Iquique	2-2 (A)	Matchday 9	Huachipato	1-0 (H)
Rangers	5-1 (H)	Matchday 10	Universidad de Chile	1-1 (A)
Santiago Wanderers	2-0 (H)	Matchday 11	Universidad de Concepción	1-0 (A)
Universidad de Chile	1-0 (A) ^{[note]}	Matchday 12	Colo-Colo	2-3 (H)
Cobreloa	2-1 (H)	Matchday 13	Cobresal	4-0 (A)
Everton	2-0 (A)	Matchday 14	Cobreloa	1-0 (H)
Antofagasta	0-2 (A)	Matchday 15	Unión La Calera	2-1 (A)
Colo-Colo	1-0 (H)	Matchday 16	Unión Española	1-0 (H)
Unión La Calera	2-0 (A)	Matchday 17	Rangers	4-3 (H)

1. The match between Santiago Wanderers and O'Higgins finished with result 2:2, but the coach Ivo Basay put on the match 6 foreigners players, being punished with a 3-0 defeat against.

2. The match between Universidad de Chile and Universidad Católica was suspended and finished with the result at the last minute of the game (0:1).

=== League table ===
- After the 17 matches of the round robin

Pos	Team	Pld	W	D	L	GF	GA	GD	Pts	Qualification
1	Universidad Católica	17	12	3	2	37	13	+24	39	Súper Final (tied in points)
2	O'Higgins	17	12	3	2	28	13	+15	39	Súper Final (tied in points)
3	Unión Española	17	9	1	7	21	15	+6	28	Already qualified for Copa Libertadores (Transición champion)
4	Universidad de Chile	17	7	6	4	31	16	+15	27	Apertura Liguilla
5	Palestino	17	8	3	6	26	26	0	27	Apertura Liguilla
6	Iquique	17	7	5	5	22	21	+1	26	Apertura Liguilla

- After the Súper Final

Pos	Team	Pld	W	D	L	GF	GA	GD	Pts	Qualification
1	O'Higgins	17	12	3	2	28	13	+15	39	2014 Copa Libertadores group stage
2	Universidad Católica	17	12	3	2	37	13	+24	39	Apertura Liguilla
3	Unión Española	17	9	1	7	21	15	+6	28	Already qualified for Copa Libertadores (Transición champion)
4	Universidad de Chile	17	7	6	4	31	16	+15	27	Apertura Liguilla
5	Palestino	17	8	3	6	26	26	0	27	Apertura Liguilla
6	Iquique	17	7	5	5	22	21	+1	26	Apertura Liguilla

== Details ==
10 December 2013
19:30

Universidad Católica	0–1	O'Higgins
	Report	Hernández 34'

Estadio Nacional, Santiago
Attendance: 40,000
Referee: Jorge Osorio

GK	1	(Chile) Cristopher Toselli
RB	4	(Chile) Cristián Álvarez (c)
CB	3	(Chile) Enzo Roco
CB	11	(Chile) Hans Martínez	(yellow card) 45'
LB	24	(Chile) Alfonso Parot	(yellow card) 85'
RM	19	(Chile) Fabián Manzano
CM	6	(Chile) Fernando Cordero
CM	5	(Argentina) Tomás Costa	(yellow card) 42'	(substituted off) 69'
LM	15	(Chile) Michael Ríos	(substituted off) 56'
CF	22	(Chile) Matías Jadue	(substituted off) 69'
CF	18	(Argentina) Ismael Sosa
Substitutes:
GK	21	(Argentina) Franco Costanzo
DF	2	(Chile) Marko Biskupovic
MF	9	(Chile) Fernando Meneses
MF	14	(Chile) José Luis Muñoz	(substituted in) 56'
FW	30	(Chile) Nicolás Castillo	(substituted in) 69'
FW	17	(Chile) Álvaro Ramos	(substituted in) 69'
FW	8	(Argentina) Ramiro Costa
Manager:
(Uruguay) Martín Lasarte

GK	12	(Chile) Paulo Garcés	(yellow card) 82'
RB	8	(Chile) Yerson Opazo
CB	22	(Argentina) Mariano Uglessich
CB	5	(Argentina) Julio Barroso
LB	24	(Argentina) Alejandro López
RCM	2	(Chile) Braulio Leal (c)	(substituted off) 74'
LCM	5	(Chile) César Fuentes
AM	10	(Argentina) Pablo Hernández
RW	7	(Chile) Luis Pedro Figueroa	(substituted off) 46'
LW	13	(Chile) Gonzalo Barriga	(yellow card) 63'	(substituted off) 80'
CF	9	(Argentina) Pablo Calandria
Substitutes:
GK	1	(Chile) Roberto González
DF	27	(Chile) Nicolás Vargas	(substituted in) 80'
DF	4	(Chile) Benjamín Vidal	(substituted in) 74'
MF	14	(Chile) Claudio Meneses
MF	11	(Chile) Francisco Pizarro	(yellow card) 66'	(substituted in) 46'
FW	19	(Chile) Carlos Escobar
FW	16	(Chile) Osmán Huerta
Manager:
(Argentina) Eduardo Berizzo

Man of the Match:
Paulo Garcés (O'Higgins)
Assistant referees:
Juan Maturana
Raúl Orellana
Fourth official:
Eduardo Gamboa

Match rules

- 90 minutes.
- Penalty shoot-out if scores still level.
- Seven named substitutes.
- Maximum of three substitutions.

Champions
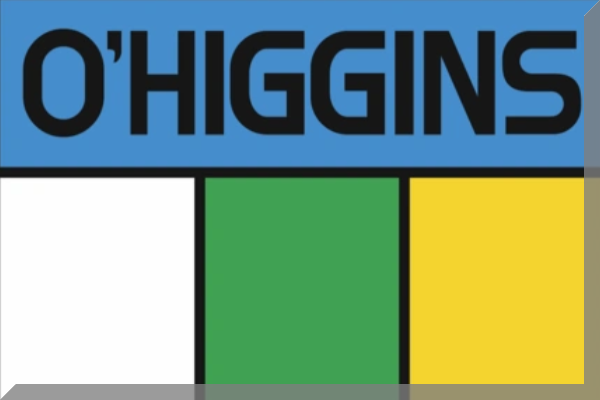
O'Higgins
1st title

=== Statistics ===
First half
	UC	OHI
Goals scored	0	1
Total shots	5	1
Shots on target	2	0
Saves	0	2
Corner kicks	2	1
Fouls committed	7	5
Offsides	0	1
Yellow cards	2	0
Red cards	0	0

Second half
	UC	OHI
Goals scored	0	0
Total shots	4	4
Shots on target	0	1
Saves	1	0
Corner kicks	8	0
Fouls committed	6	9
Offsides	0	0
Yellow cards	0	2
Red cards	0	0

Overall
	UC	OHI
Goals scored	0	1
Total shots	9	5
Shots on target	3	1
Saves	1	2
Corner kicks	10	1
Fouls committed	13	14
Offsides	0	1
Yellow cards	2	2
Red cards	0	0
