= Sebastián López (footballer, born September 1985) =

Argentine footballer (born 1985)

Personal information
- Full name: Sebastián Alberto López
- Date of birth: 15 September 1985 (age 41)
- Place of birth: San Nicolás, Argentina
- Height: 1.87 m (6 ft 2 in)
- Position: Goalkeeper

Team information
- Current team: Los Andes

Youth career
- 2002–2006: Banfield

Senior career*
Years	Team	Apps	(Gls)
2006–2015	Banfield	0	(0)
2011–2013	→ Deportes Antofagasta (loan)	81	(0)
2013–2014	→ Deportes Temuco (loan)	29	(0)
2014–2015	→ Uniautónoma (loan)	56	(0)
2016–2017	Jaguares de Córdoba	39	(0)
2018–2019	Cobresal	59	(1)
2020	Deportes Temuco	25	(0)
2021	Lautaro de Buin	0	(0)
2021	Santiago Morning	13	(0)
2022	Deportes Temuco	21	(0)
2023–	Los Andes	107	(0)
- * Club domestic league appearances and goals as of 17:11, 29 April 2026 (UTC)

Sebastián Alberto López (born 15 September 1985) is an Argentine footballer who plays as a goalkeeper for Los Andes.

== Honours ==
=== Club ===
Banfield

- Primera División (1): 2009 Clausura

Deportes Antofagasta

- Primera B (1): 2011 (Note: includes 2011 Apertura)
