= Leonardo Saavedra =

Chilean footballer (born 1989)

Personal information
- Full name: Leonardo Andrés Saavedra Salazar
- Date of birth: 3 January 1989 (age 37)
- Place of birth: Rancagua, Chile
- Height: 1.67 m (5 ft 5 1/2 in)
- Position: Striker

Senior career*
Years	Team	Apps	(Gls)
2008–2009	Deportes Antofagasta	21	(8)
2009–2012	O'Higgins	11	(0)
2010	→ Provincial Osorno (loan)		
2011	→ Deportes Antofagasta (loan)		

International career
2008	Chile U23	4	(0)
- * Club domestic league appearances and goals as of 22 March 2020

Leonardo Andrés Saavedra Salazar (born 3 January 1989) is a Chilean former footballer.

== Club career ==
He played for O'Higgins from 2009 to 2012.

== International career ==
He represented Chile U23 at the 2008 Inter Continental Cup in Malaysia.

== Honours ==
=== Player ===
Deportes Antofagasta

- Primera B (1): 2011 Apertura
