= René Bugueño =

Chilean footballer (born 1987)

Personal information
- Full name: René Alexis Bugueño Zenteno
- Date of birth: 2 October 1987 (age 39)
- Place of birth: Antofagasta, Chile
- Height: 1.78 m (5 ft 10 in)
- Position: Defender

Team information
- Current team: Santiago Morning
- Number: 24

Senior career*
Years	Team	Apps	(Gls)
2006–2012	Antofagasta	154	(7)
2012–2013	O'Higgins	12	(0)
2013–2014	Unión La Calera	19	(0)
2014–2015	Deportes Copiapó	33	(2)
2015–2017	Curicó Unido	45	(1)
2017–2018	Ñublense	30	(0)
2019	Cobresal	13	(0)
2020–	Santiago Morning	6	(0)
- * Club domestic league appearances and goals as of 16 December 2020

Rene Alexis Bugueño Zenteno (born 2 October 1987) is a Chilean footballer currently playing for Santiago Morning.

== Honours ==
=== Player ===
Deportes Antofagasta

- Primera B (1): 2011 Apertura
