= Henry Calderón =

Chilean footballer (born 1993)

Personal information
- Full name: Henry Orlando Calderón Caro
- Date of birth: 19 April 1993 (age 33)
- Place of birth: Villarrica, Chile
- Height: 1.81 m (5 ft 11 in)
- Position: Striker

Team information
- Current team: General Velásquez
- Number: 10

Youth career
- 2008–2012: O'Higgins

Senior career*
Years	Team	Apps	(Gls)
2012–2013	O'Higgins	1	(0)
2014–	General Velásquez	0	(0)
- * Club domestic league appearances and goals as of 18 July 2012

Henry Calderón (Spanish pronunciation: [ˈenɾi kaldeˈɾon], born 19 April 1993) is a Chilean footballer that currently plays for the Chilean club General Velásquez as a striker.

== Career ==
=== Youth career ===
Name started his career at Primera División de Chile club O'Higgins. He progressed from the under categories club all the way to the senior team.

=== O'Higgins ===
Calderón won the Apertura 2013-14 with O'Higgins, in the 2013–14 Súper Final Apertura against Universidad Católica, being the first title for O'Higgins.

On 2014, he is signed for General Velásquez.

== Honours ==
=== Club ===
O'Higgins

- Primera División: Apertura 2013-14

=== Individual ===
O'Higgins

- Medalla Santa Cruz de Triana: 2014
