= Javier Capelli =

Argentine footballer

Personal information
- Full name: Javier Alejandro Capelli
- Date of birth: 7 January 1985 (age 41)
- Place of birth: Junín, Argentina
- Height: 1.78 m (5 ft 10 in)
- Position: Defender

Youth career
- Sarmiento de Junín

Senior career*
Years	Team	Apps	(Gls)
2006–2010	Sarmiento de Junín	58	(4)
2011–2013	Rangers	68	(5)
2012	Rangers B	1	(0)
2013–2014	Palestino	29	(2)
2014–2017	San Martín SJ	53	(1)
2017–2019	Sarmiento de Junín	21	(0)
2019	Talleres RE	10	(0)
2019–2021	Singlar Club	–	(–)
- * Club domestic league appearances and goals

Javier Alejandro Capelli (born January 7, 1985) is an Argentine former footballer who played as a defender.

== Career ==
Besides Argentina, Capelli played in Chile for both Rangers and Palestino.

In 2019, Capelli played for Talleres de Remedios de Escalada in the Primera B Metropolitana. In the second half of the same year, he switched to Singlar Club.

== Personal life ==
He is nicknamed Gallo (Rooster).
