= Alejandro López (footballer, born 1989) =

Argentine footballer

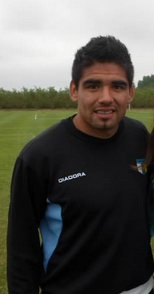
- López with in O'Higgins 2013

Personal information
- Full name: Eduardo Alejandro López
- Date of birth: June 16, 1989 (age 37)
- Place of birth: Lincoln, Argentina
- Height: 1.73 m (5 ft 8 in)
- Position: Left back

Youth career
- 2003–2007: Rivadavia de Lincoln

Senior career*
| Years | Team | Apps | (Gls) |
| 2006–2007 | → Fortín Club (loan) | – | (–) |
| 2008–2010 | Rivadavia de Lincoln | 23 | (3) |
| 2009–2010 | → Tigre (loan) | – | (–) |
| 2011–2015 | O'Higgins | 132 | (3) |
| 2015–2016 | Cobresal | 22 | (4) |
| 2016 | San Martín (T) | 4 | (0) |
| 2016–2017 | Rivadavia de Lincoln | 12 | (1) |
| 2017 | Cobresal | 12 | (1) |
| 2018 | Rivadavia de Lincoln | 8 | (1) |
| 2019 | Juventud Unida (SI) | – | (–) |
| 2020 | Defensores Unidos | 8 | (0) |
| 2021 | Mariano Moreno | – | (–) |
| 2022 | Tres Algarrobos | – | (–) |
| 2023 | Caset | – | (–) |
- * Club domestic league appearances and goals as of 25 May 2018

Eduardo Alejandro López (Spanish pronunciation: [eˈðwaɾðo aleˈxandɾo ˈlopeθ], born 16 June 1989) is a former Argentine footballer who played as a left back.

== Career ==
=== Youth career and debut ===
Alejandro start his career in his city club Rivadavia de Lincoln, when played in the youth categories since 2003 to 2007. In the following season, he played in the first team of the club, where it remained until 2010, playing 23 matches and marking 3 goals.

=== O'Higgins ===
In 2011, Alejandro comes to trial to the Chilean club O'Higgins, and after the tests, he start to play in the first team of the club, making his debut in Primera División against Unión San Felipe, when entered in the minute 62 replacing Mauricio Arias.

In 2012, Alejandro play in the first team and was considered in the starting line-up, as left back. On June 28, 2012, he scored the second goal in the first final of the Torneo de Apertura 2012 in the 72 minutes. Finally, in the second final O'Higgins lose the final against Universidad de Chile in penalties.

In 2013, he won the 2013–14 Apertura with O'Higgins, being the first title in the history of the club. In the tournament, he played in 15 of 18 matches, being an important part of the Berizzo's team in the back with Julio Barroso, Yerson Opazo and Mariano Uglessich.

He participated with the club in the 2014 Copa Libertadores where they faced Deportivo Cali, Cerro Porteño and Lanús, being third and being eliminated in the group stage. In the tournament, López scored a free kick goal against Cerro Porteño.

In March 2014, he was affected from the first-team because indiscipline with his teammate Fernando Gutiérrez, losing it the rest of the 2014 Copa Libertadores and the 2014 Supercopa de Chile.

=== Cobresal ===
In June 2015, López was released from O'Higgins and was signed to the 2015–16 season by the current Campeonato Nacional Champions Cobresal. He returned to Cobresal on second half 2017 to play in the 2017 Primera B.

=== Return to Argentina ===
After playing for Cobresal in 2017, López returned to his hometown club, Rivadavia de Lincoln, and next has mainly played for amateur clubs. Since 2019 he has played for Juventud Unida from Santa Isabel (Liga Venadense), Defensores Unidos from Zárate (Primera B Metropolitana), Mariano Moreno from Junín (Regional Amateur) and Deportivo Tres Algarrobos (Liga del Oeste).

== Career statistics ==
=== Club ===
As of 16 January 2015

| Club | Season | League | | | Copa Chile | | Supercopa | | Continental | | Total | |
| Club | Season | Division | Apps | Goals | Apps | Goals | Apps | Goals | Apps | Goals | Apps | Goals |
|---|---|---|---|---|---|---|---|---|---|---|---|---|
| O'Higgins | 2011 | Primera División | 29 | 0 | 3 | 0 | — | | | | 32 | 0 |
| O'Higgins | 2012 | Primera División | 36 | 1 | 7 | 1 | — | | 2 (Note: Appearances in the Copa Sudamericana) | 0 | 45 | 2 |
| O'Higgins | 2013 | Primera División | 14 | 0 | — | | | | | | 14 | 0 |
| O'Higgins | 2013–14 | Primera División | 23 | 2 | 7 | 0 | 0 | 0 | 3 (Note: Appearances in the Copa Libertadores) | 1 | 33 | 3 |
| O'Higgins | 2014–15 | Primera División | 30 | 0 | 4 | 0 | — | | | | 34 | 0 |
| Career total | | | 132 | 3 | 21 | 1 | 0 | 0 | 5 | 1 | 158 | 5 |

== Honours ==
=== Club ===
O'Higgins

- Primera División: 2013–14 Apertura

=== Individual ===
O'Higgins

- Medalla Santa Cruz de Triana: 2014
