= Cristian Canuhé =

Argentine footballer (born 1987)

Personal information
- Full name: Cristian Ezequiel Canuhé
- Date of birth: August 25, 1987 (age 39)
- Place of birth: Toay, Argentina
- Height: 1.79 m (5 ft 10 in)
- Position: Midfielder

Senior career*
Years	Team	Apps	(Gls)
2008-2010	Defensa y Justicia	31	(3)
2010-2015	Audax Italiano	105	(8)
2013-2014	→ Atlético de Rafaela (loan)	34	(3)
2015	San Martín de San Juan	14	(0)
2016	Temperley	9	(0)
2016-2018	All Boys	58	(6)
2018-2019	Alvarado	39	(2)
2020-2021	Ferro Carril Oeste	30	(1)
2021	Deportivo Madryn	6	(0)
2021	All Boys	7	(1)
Total		329	(23)
- * Club domestic league appearances and goals

Cristian Ezequiel Canuhé (born August 25, 1987, in Toay, Argentina) is an Argentine footballer currently playing for All Boys of the Argentine Primera B Nacional.

== Teams ==
- (Argentina) Defensa y Justicia 2008–2010
- (Chile) Audax Italiano 2010–2015
- (Argentina) Atlético de Rafaela 2013-2014 (loan)
- (Argentina) San Martín de San Juan 2015
- (Argentina) Temperley 2016
- (Argentina) All Boys 2016–2018
- (Argentina) Alvarado 2018–2019
- (Argentina) Ferro Carril Oeste 2020–2021
- (Argentina) Deportivo Madryn 2021
- (Argentina) All Boys 2021

== Personal ==
Canuhé is of Mapuche descent.
