= Nicolás Suárez (Chilean footballer) =

Chilean footballer (born 1982)

Personal information
- Full name: Víctor Nicolás Suárez Céspedes
- Date of birth: 20 May 1982 (age 44)
- Place of birth: Santiago, Chile
- Height: 1.81 m (5 ft 11 in)
- Position: Centre back

Youth career
- Colo-Colo

Senior career*
Years	Team	Apps	(Gls)
2002–2006	Unión San Felipe	?	(?)
2007	Curicó Unido	?	(?)
2008–2009	Deportes Melipilla	26	(0)
2010–2012	Unión La Calera	103	(0)
2013–2014	Palestino	36	(2)
2014–2015	Barnechea	26	(0)
2015–2016	Everton	28	(1)
2016–2017	Trasandino	29	(1)
2017–2018	Unión San Felipe	4	(0)
- * Club domestic league appearances and goals

Víctor Nicolás Suárez Céspedes (born 20 May 1982) is a Chilean retired footballer.
