= Diego González (footballer, born 1991) =

Chilean footballer

Personal information
- Full name: Diego González Reyes
- Date of birth: 16 January 1991 (age 35)
- Place of birth: Lo Miranda, Chile
- Height: 1.70 m (5 ft 7 in)
- Position: Attacking midfielder

Team information
- Current team: Copiapó
- Number: 26

Senior career*
Years	Team	Apps	(Gls)
2009–2012	O'Higgins	32	(1)
2011	→ Puerto Montt (loan)	2	(0)
2013	Deportes Temuco	15	(1)
2014	Iberia	7	(0)
2015–	Copiapó	9	(0)

International career
2010–2011	Chile U20	6	(0)
- * Club domestic league appearances and goals as of 8 December 2012

Diego Ignacio González Reyes (born 16 January 1991) is a Chilean footballer that currently plays for Deportes Copiapó in the Primera B de Chile.
