= José Contreras (footballer, born 1982) =

Chilean footballer

Personal information
- Full name: José Raúl Contreras Arrau
- Date of birth: March 23, 1982 (age 44)
- Place of birth: Quilpué, Chile
- Height: 1.73 m (5 ft 8 in)
- Position: Right-back

Youth career
- Jorge Toro
- Escuela Elías Figueroa
- Santiago Wanderers

Senior career*
Years	Team	Apps	(Gls)
2000–2006	Santiago Wanderers	144	(14)
2007	Huachipato	40	(5)
2008–2011	Universidad de Chile	91	(10)
2011–2014	Huachipato	100	(7)
2014–2016	Audax Italiano	36	(0)
Total		411	(36)

International career
2004	Chile U23		
2006–2007	Chile	9	(0)
- * Club domestic league appearances and goals

José Raúl Contreras Arrau (born March 23, 1982) is a Chilean former footballer who played as a right-back.

== Career ==
He played as a defender for Universidad de Chile. He got his chance to debut with the adult squad in 2003. He has represented his country at the Sub-23 level.

In January 2008, sixty-percent of Contreras ownership was sold to Universidad de Chile for $150,000.

== Post-retirement ==
Contreras settled in Villa Alemana and started a sports complex where he has served as a coach.

== Honours ==
Santiago Wanderers

- Primera División de Chile (1): 2001

Universidad de Chile

- Primera División de Chile (2): 2009 Apertura, 2011 Apertura

Huachipato

- Primera División de Chile (1): 2012 Clausura
