= Javier Grbec =

Argentine footballer

Personal information
- Full name: Javier Antonio Grbec
- Date of birth: 24 March 1986 (age 40)
- Place of birth: Hurlingham, Argentina
- Height: 1.84 m (6 ft 0 in)
- Position: Forward

Senior career*
Years	Team	Apps	(Gls)
2003–2004	Liniers	22	(5)
2005–2007	Deportivo Morón	34	(5)
2007–2008	Drava Ptuj	41	(4)
2009	Aluminij		
2009	Deportivo Morón	1	(1)
2010–2011	Brown de Adrogué	61	(26)
2011–2012	Quilmes	3	(0)
2012	Unión San Felipe	16	(5)
2013	Ñublense	15	(7)
2013	Manta	9	(1)
2014–2015	Temperley	38	(7)
2016	Cobresal	7	(1)
2016–2017	Brown de Adrogué	32	(4)
2017–2018	Mitre	14	(0)
- * Club domestic league appearances and goals

Javier Antonio Grbec (born 24 March 1986) is an Argentine former footballer who played as a forward.

== Teams ==
- (Argentina) Liniers 2003–2004
- (Argentina) Deportivo Morón 2005–2007
- (Slovenia) Drava Ptuj 2007–2008
- (Slovenia) Aluminij 2009
- (Argentina) Deportivo Morón 2009
- (Argentina) Brown de Adrogué 2010–2011
- (Argentina) Quilmes 2011–2012
- (Chile) Unión San Felipe 2012
- (Chile) Ñublense 2013
- (Ecuador) Manta 2013
- (Argentina) Temperley 2014–2015
- (Chile) Cobresal 2016
- (Argentina) Brown de Adrogué 2016–2017
- (Argentina) Mitre 2017–2018

== Personal life ==
Grbec holds Slovenian citizenship from his descent.

Grbec is a rock fan and plays guitar. He also graduated as an audio engineer.
