= Cristian Brítez =

Paraguayan footballer (born 1984)

Personal information
- Full name: Cristian David Brítez Sánchez
- Date of birth: 25 September 1984 (age 42)
- Place of birth: Asunción, Paraguay
- Height: 1.86 m (6 ft 1 in)
- Position: Goalkeeper

Youth career
- Sol de América
- Guaraní

Senior career*
Years	Team	Apps	(Gls)
2007	Sol de América	4	(0)
2008	Deportes Antofagasta	16	(0)
2009	Deportes Puerto Montt	23	(0)
2008–2012	Universidad de Concepción	68	(0)
2013	Tacuary		
2014	Independiente FBC		
2015	12 de Octubre		
2016	Deportivo Santaní		
2017	Martín Ledesma	3	(0)
2022	3 de Febrero FBC	–	(–)
2023	13 de Mayo	–	(–)

Managerial career
- 2024: Dominican Republic U23 (goalkeeping coach)
- * Club domestic league appearances and goals

Cristian David Brítez Sánchez (born 25 September 1984) is a Paraguayan former football goalkeeper.

== Club career ==
Brítez began his career in the lower divisions of Club Sol de América. In 2008, Britez joined Universidad de Concepción of the Primera División de Chile, and was immediately loaned to Deportes Antofagasta, from first-tier too. The incoming year, he was loaned again, now to Deportes Puerto Montt from the second level.

He finally began to play for Universidad de Concepción in mid-2009, becoming as back-up of Federico Elduayen. For the 2010 season, following Elduayen's departure, Brítez became the team's first-choice keeper.

After being released from Concepción-based team in December 2012, he returned his homeland, joining to Tacuary in 2013.

In 2023, he played for Club 13 de Mayo.

== International career ==
At some point, he had the opportunity to go to the Paraguay national football team, according to the reports, an informant of the Paraguay coach, Gerardo Martino, was following this player.

== Coaching career ==
Brítez served as the goalkeeping coach of the Dominican Republic national under-23 team in the 2024 Summer Olympics.

== Club statistics ==
Club Performance
Club	Season	League		Copa Chile		Total
Club	Season	App	G.A	App	G.A	App	G.A
Universidad de Concepción	Torneo 2010	14	-16	-	-	14	-16
Universidad de Concepción	Apertura 2011	14	-22	-	-	14	-22
Universidad de Concepción	Clausura 2011	15	-18	-	-	15	-18
Universidad de Concepción	Apertura 2012	16	-23	-	-	16	-23
Universidad de Concepción	Clausura 2012	9	-17	-	-	9	-17
Club Total		68	-96	-	-	68	-96
