= Fernando de la Fuente =

Argentine footballer (born 1986)

Personal information
- Full name: Fernando Emmanuel de la Fuente
- Date of birth: 26 March 1986 (age 40)
- Place of birth: Sierra Grande, Argentina
- Height: 1.79 m (5 ft 10 in)
- Position: Central midfielder

Youth career
- 1998–2000: Deportivo Patagones
- 2001–2003: Racing Club

Senior career*
Years	Team	Apps	(Gls)
2004–2007	Racing Club	11	(0)
2007–2008	San Martín SJ	16	(0)
2008–2009	Unión Santa Fe	20	(0)
2009–2010	Atlético Rafaela	30	(0)
2010	Chacarita Juniors	12	(0)
2011–2014	O'Higgins	38	(0)
2012	→ Deportes La Serena (loan)	14	(3)
2012–2013	→ Colo-Colo (loan)	31	(0)
2013	→ Instituto	19	(0)
2014	Santiago Wanderers	12	(0)
2014–2016	Nueva Chicago	37	(2)
2016	Patronato	7	(1)
2016–2017	Quilmes	2	(0)
2017–2018	Moca FC	–	(–)
2018	Cipolletti	10	(0)
2019	Deportivo Patagones	–	(–)
2019–2021	Sol de Mayo	37	(0)
Total		296	(6)
- * Club domestic league appearances and goals

Fernando Emmanuel de la Fuente (Spanish pronunciation: [feɾˈnando ðe la ˈfwente], born 26 March 1986) is an Argentine former footballer. He primarily played as a defensive midfielder, but could also operate into the central zone or as a box-to-box.

== Career ==
De la Fuente began his career at Racing Club, being promoted by coach Diego Simeone after plays youth spells at hometown Patagones. In 2011, Feña joined Primera División club O'Higgins in Chile where had a breakout season that allowed him move to Chilean giant Colo-Colo, after a prior spell at Deportes La Serena.

In November 2017, de la Fuente moved to the Dominican Republic and joined Moca FC.

De la Fuente joined Club Cipolletti in July 2018, but left the club again at the end of the 2018.

His last clubs were Deportivo Patagones and Sol de Mayo in his homeland.
