= Milton Alegre =

Argentine-Chilean footballer (born 1991)

Personal information
- Full name: Milton Tobías Oscar Alegre López
- Date of birth: 14 October 1991 (age 35)
- Place of birth: Alcorta, Argentina
- Height: 1.83 m (6 ft 0 in)
- Position: Striker

Team information
- Current team: Magallanes
- Number: 23

Youth career
- Asociación Rosario Sport
- Botafogo de Rosario
- O'Higgins

Senior career*
Years	Team	Apps	(Gls)
2009–2016	O'Higgins	5	(0)
2012–2013	→ Deportes Concepción (loan)	22	(5)
2013–2014	→ Barnechea (loan)	4	(0)
2014–2016	→ Malleco Unido (loan)	50	(17)
2016–2017	San Antonio Unido	25	(18)
2017	Deportes Melipilla	15	(8)
2018	General Velásquez	24	(15)
2019	Deportes Melipilla	7	(1)
2019	Fernández Vial	15	(6)
2020–2021	Colchagua	21	(5)
2021	Independiente Cauquenes	20	(15)
2022	Deportes Recoleta	26	(8)
2023	Santiago Wanderers	23	(3)
2024	Rangers	30	(4)
2025	Deportes Santa Cruz	29	(8)
2026–	Magallanes	0	(0)
- * Club domestic league appearances and goals as of 1 February 2026

Milton Tobías Oscar Alegre López (born 14 October 1991) is an Argentine-Chilean footballer who plays as a striker for Magallanes.

== Career ==
Alegre was with Asociación Rosario Sport and Botafogo de Rosario in Argentina before moving to Chile and joining the O'Higgins youth system.

In November 2022, Alegre joined Santiago Wanderers for the 2023 season. He switched to Rangers de Talca for the 2024 season.

In 2025, Alegre signed with Deportes Santa Cruz. The next year, he switched to Magallanes.

== Personal life ==
Alegre holds dual Argentine-Chilean citizenship since he received his naturalization certificate in August 2021.
