= Sebastián Céspedes =

Chilean footballer (born 1992)

Personal information
- Full name: Sebastián Edgardo Céspedes Reyes
- Date of birth: 18 April 1992 (age 34)
- Place of birth: Rancagua, Chile
- Height: 1.74 m (5 ft 9 in)
- Position: Attacking midfielder

Team information
- Current team: Deportes Rengo
- Number: 7

Youth career
- 2007–2011: O'Higgins

Senior career*
| Years | Team | Apps | (Gls) |
| 2011–2015 | O'Higgins | 9 | (0) |
| 2013 | → Enfoque (loan) | – | (–) |
| 2014 | → Deportes Rengo (loan) | – | (–) |
| 2015–2016 | Barnechea | 17 | (1) |
| 2016–2018 | Rangers | 59 | (7) |
| 2019–2021 | Cobresal | 20 | (2) |
| 2023– | Deportes Rengo | 9 | (2) |
- * Club domestic league appearances and goals as of 18:10, 17 May 2019 (UTC)

Sebastián Edgardo Céspedes Reyes (Spanish pronunciation: [seβasˈtjan ˈsespeðes], born 18 April 1992) is a Chilean footballer who currently plays for Deportes Rengo in the Segunda División Profesional de Chile.

== Career ==
He signed with Deportes Rengo in the Segunda División Profesional de Chile for the 2023 season.
