= Benjamín Vidal =

Chilean footballer (born 1991)

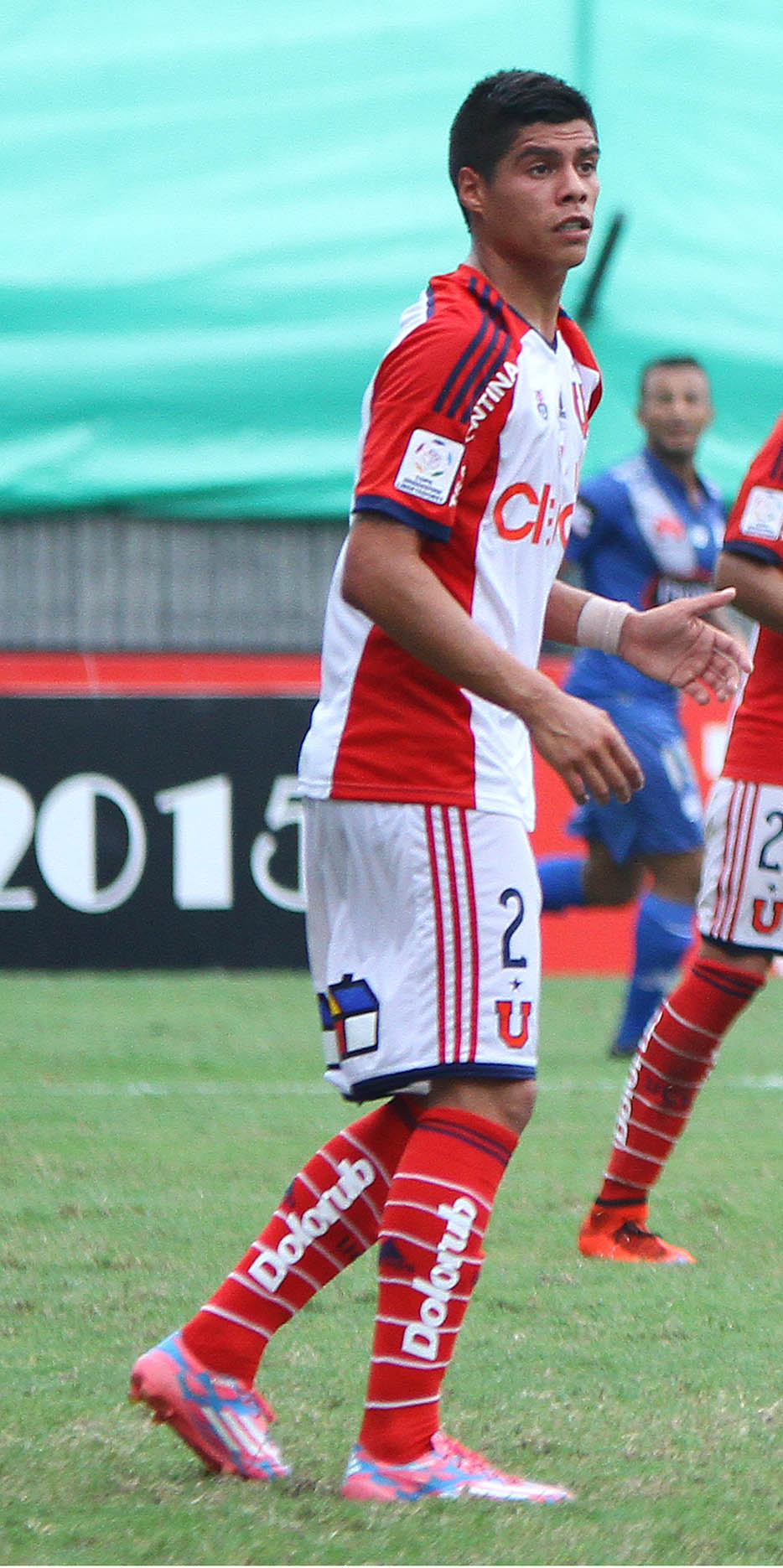
- Vidal with Universidad de Chile in 2015

Personal information
- Full name: Benjamín Fernando Vidal Allende
- Date of birth: 18 March 1991 (age 35)
- Place of birth: Doñihue, Chile
- Height: 1.81 m (5 ft 11 in)
- Position: Centre back

Youth career
- Cultural Doñihue
- O'Higgins

Senior career*
Years	Team	Apps	(Gls)
2010–2014	O'Higgins	46	(1)
2011	→ Deportes Puerto Montt (loan)	17	(0)
2014–2016	Universidad de Chile	23	(1)
2016–2017	Palestino	23	(1)
2017–2020	Universidad Católica	6	(0)
2018	→ Palestino (loan)	14	(1)
2019–2020	→ Coquimbo Unido (loan)	5	(0)
2021–2022	Coquimbo Unido	26	(3)
2022	Fernández Vial	30	(1)
2023–2024	Deportes Antofagasta	29	(0)
Total		219	(8)

International career
2009	Chile U20	1	(1)
- * Club domestic league appearances and goals

Benjamín Fernando Vidal Allende (born 18 March 1991) is a Chilean professional former footballer who played as a centre-back.

== Career ==
=== Youth career ===
Fuentes started his career at Primera División de Chile club O'Higgins. He progressed from the under categories club all the way to the senior team.

=== O'Higgins ===
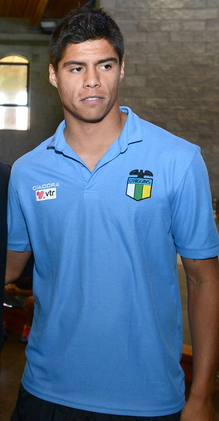
Vidal with O'Higgins in 2013

Vidal debuted with O'Higgins in the match against Everton on 14 November 2010. The match finished 0:0.

In 2012, Vidal was runner-up with O'Higgins, after lose the final against Universidad de Chile in the penalty shoot-out. In 2013, he won the Apertura 2013-14 with O'Higgins. In the tournament, he played in 10 of 18 matches.

In 2014, he won the Supercopa de Chile against Deportes Iquique, playing the 90 minutes of the match.

He participated with the club in the 2014 Copa Libertadores where they faced Deportivo Cali, Cerro Porteño and Lanús, being third and being eliminated in the group stage.

=== Universidad de Chile ===
For the 2014–15 season, Vidal is signed for Universidad de Chile for a US$1.5M fee.

In the U dispute the Copa Libertadores 2015 and consecrated champion of the Apertura 2014, the Supercopa of Chile 2015 and the Glass Chile 2015, although without having more protagonism in the stellar equipment. As a result, in June 2016, his transfer to Palestine is confirmed.

=== Palestino ===
In the team led by Nicolás Cordova takes up regularity and becomes the owner of the team, fulfilling an outstanding participation in the Copa Sudamericana 2016, where his team would be eliminated in the quarterfinals at the hands of San Lorenzo de Almagro, after having left in the Way to Flamengo from Brazil.

=== Universidad Católica ===
After a big step for Palestino, where he is in several parties, he is bought by the UC, who is left with 65% of Benjamin's pass

=== Retirement ===
On 8 September 2025, Vidal announced his retirement, aged 34. His last club was Deportes Antofagasta in 2024. It was confirmed his retirement in November 2025.

== International career ==
Vidal played for Chile at the U18 and U20 levels. He scored a goal against New Zealand U17.

== Honours ==
O'Higgins

- Primera División: 2013–A
- Supercopa de Chile: 2014

Universidad de Chile

- Copa Chile: 2015
- Supercopa de Chile: 2015

Palestino

- Copa Chile: 2018

Universidad Católica

- Supercopa de Chile: 2019
- Friendlies (1): Torneo de Verano Fox Sports 2019

Coquimbo Unido

- Primera B (1): 2021

Individual

- Medalla Santa Cruz de Triana: 2014
