= Luis Marín (footballer, born 1983) =

Chilean footballer

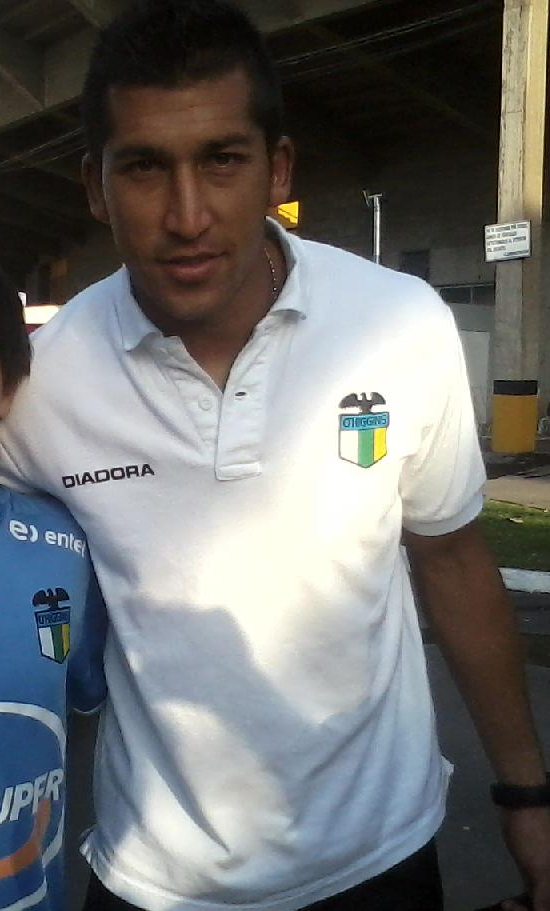
- Marín with O'Higgins in 2012

Personal information
- Full name: Luis Antonio Marín Barahona
- Date of birth: 18 May 1983 (age 43)
- Place of birth: Valparaíso, Chile
- Height: 1.88 m (6 ft 2 in)
- Position: Goalkeeper

Youth career
- Colo-Colo Casablanca
- Unión Cordillera

Senior career*
Years	Team	Apps	(Gls)
2003–2006	Audax Italiano	0	(0)
2007	Lota Schwager	28	(0)
2008–2010	Unión Española	51	(0)
2011–2013	O'Higgins	90	(0)
2013–2014	Universidad de Chile	14	(0)
2015	Sporting Kansas City	8	(0)
2015–2016	Palestino	32	(0)
2016	Deportes Temuco	23	(0)

International career^{‡}
2008–2012	Chile	8	(0)
- * Club domestic league appearances and goals as of 27 April 2015 ‡ National team caps and goals as of 13 May 2010

Luis Antonio Marín Barahona (born 18 May 1983) is a Chilean former footballer who played as a goalkeeper.

== Career ==
As a youth player, Marín was with a Colo-Colo football academy based in Casablanca and also represented the Valparaíso's team and Unión Cordillera. After trialed with Santiago Wanderers and Colo-Colo, he signed with Audax Italiano as a professional player.

Marin began his professional career playing for Audax Italiano from 2003 to 2006, and later in 2007 he joined Lota Schwager. In 2008, Marín was signed by Unión Española. His performances at Unión led to being selected for the Chile national football team to play in the 2010 FIFA World Cup.

In January 2011 he signed for O'Higgins and was captain of the team, reaching the 2012 Torneo Apertura final lost with Universidad de Chile on the penalty shoot-out, club which Marín signed a two-year loan in 2013.

On 18 December 2014, after he finished contract with Universidad de Chile, Marin signed for Sporting Kansas City of Major League Soccer. After playing Sporting KC's first eight matches (2–2–4) of 2015 with 19 saves, three shutouts and a 1.50 goals against average, Marin agreed to terminate his contract on 27 May.

On 3 June 2015, he returned his country for join Palestino.

== International career ==
He received his first call up to play for Chile in May 2010 against Trinidad and Tobago, performing well in a 2–0 win at Iquique. After appearing in a 0–0 draw with Venezuela at Temuco and once in the 2010 FIFA World Cup provisional list, against Mexico, he finally was included in the 23-man list by Marcelo Bielsa to represents Chile at South Africa.

== Post-retirement ==
In October 2025, Marín was appointed the president of SIFUP, the trade union for professional association footballers in Chile, after Gamadiel García moved to FIFPRO.

== Honours ==
Universidad de Chile

- Primera División de Chile: 2014 Apertura

Individual

- Medalla Bicentenario: 2010
