= 2011 Campeonato Nacional Primera B =

Primera B de Chile
- Season: 2011 Primera B
- Champions: Deportes Antofagasta

The 2011 Primera B season was the 61st completed season of the Primera B de Chile.

== Torneo Apertura ==
Deportes Antofagasta was tournament’s champion.

Pos	Team	Pld	W	D	L	GF	GA	GD	Pts
1	Deportes Antofagasta	19	12	4	3	26	19	+7	40
2	Rangers	19	12	3	4	31	21	+10	39
3	Deportes Concepción	19	9	5	5	27	18	+9	32
4	Naval	19	7	6	6	24	24	0	27
5	Curicó Unido	19	7	5	7	31	30	+1	26
6	Coquimbo Unido	19	7	5	7	24	26	−2	26
7	Unión Temuco	19	7	4	8	25	21	+4	25
8	San Luis de Quillota	19	7	4	8	27	25	+2	25
9	Deportes Puerto Montt	19	6	6	7	20	22	−2	24
10	San Marcos de Arica	19	6	5	8	31	30	+1	23
11	Lota Schwager	19	6	4	9	17	21	−4	22
12	Everton	19	5	6	8	21	27	−6	21
13	Magallanes	19	5	6	8	25	32	−7	21
14	Deportes Copiapó	19	5	1	13	21	34	−13	16

== Torneo Clausura ==
Everton de Viña del Mar was tournament’s champion.

Pos	Team	Pld	W	D	L	GF	GA	GD	Pts
1	Everton	19	11	6	2	24	13	+11	39
2	Naval	19	11	2	6	32	25	+7	35
3	Deportes Antofagasta	19	10	3	6	36	22	+14	33
4	San Luis de Quillota	19	8	5	6	18	19	−1	29
5	Deportes Concepción	19	8	4	7	30	27	+3	28
6	Lota Schwager	19	7	6	6	17	18	−1	27
7	Unión Temuco	19	7	5	7	23	28	−5	26
8	Coquimbo Unido	19	7	4	8	25	26	−1	25
9	San Marcos de Arica	19	7	4	8	23	27	−4	25
10	Deportes Puerto Montt	19	6	6	7	26	26	0	24
11	Rangers	19	6	2	11	26	25	+1	20
12	Deportes Copiapó	19	4	8	7	19	29	−10	20
13	Magallanes	19	4	7	8	22	25	−3	19
14	Curicó Unido	19	3	6	10	16	27	−11	15
