= Ramón Fernández (footballer) =

Argentine-Chilean footballer (born 1984)

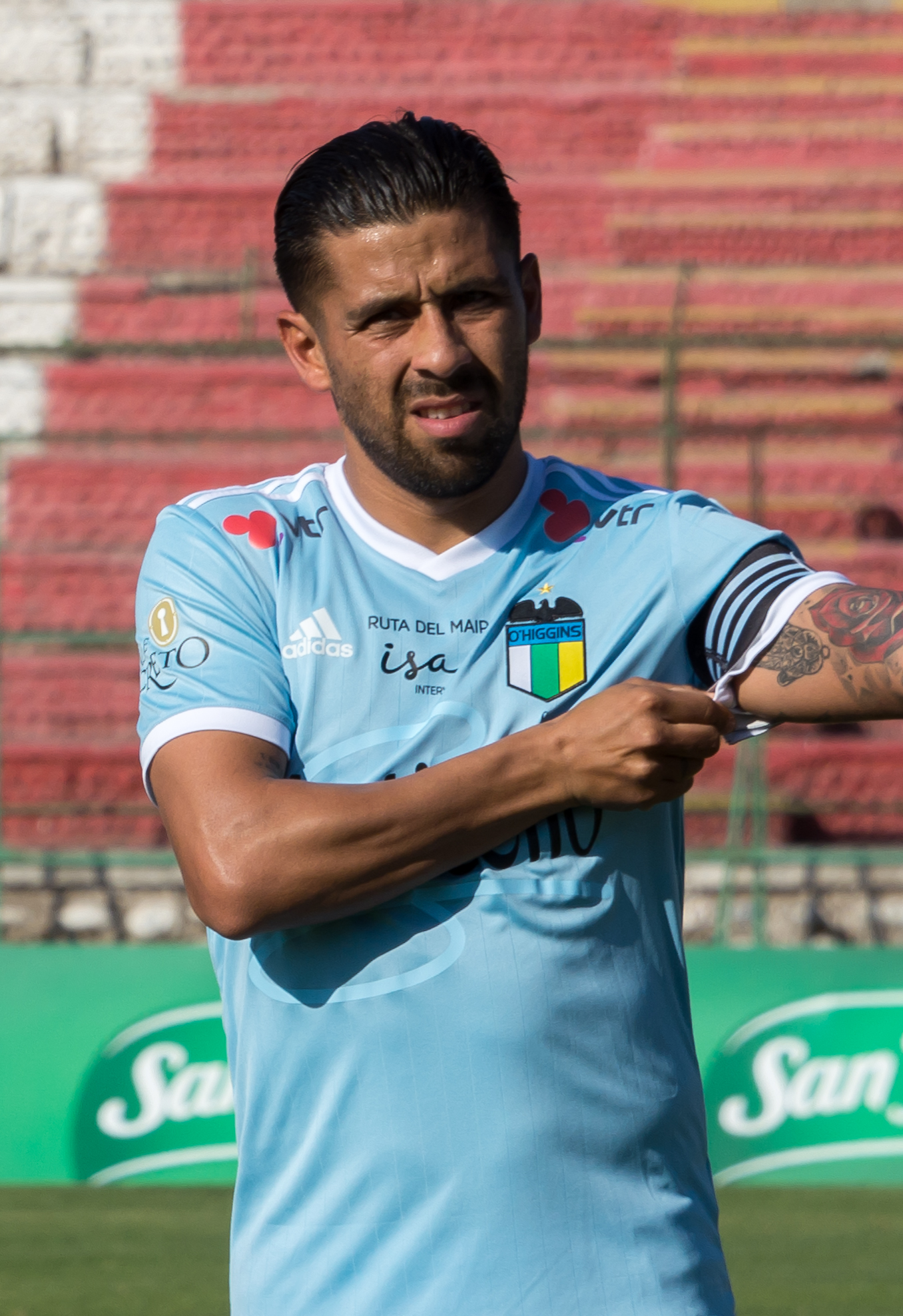
- Fernández with O'Higgins in 2019.

Personal information
- Full name: Ramón Ignacio Fernández
- Date of birth: 3 December 1984 (age 41)
- Place of birth: Formosa, Argentina
- Height: 1.70 m (5 ft 7 in)
- Position: Midfielder

Youth career
- 2001–2003: Estudiantes

Senior career*
Years	Team	Apps	(Gls)
2003–2011	Estudiantes	6	(1)
2004–2005	→ Sarmiento Junín (loan)	14	(2)
2006–2007	→ Ben Hur (loan)	22	(0)
2007	→ Defensa y Justicia (loan)	12	(0)
2008	→ Atlanta (loan)	39	(6)
2008–2010	→ Rijeka (loan)	50	(7)
2011	→ Unión La Calera (loan)	39	(5)
2012	O'Higgins	38	(12)
2013–2016	Universidad de Chile	64	(8)
2015–2016	→ O'Higgins (loan)	33	(4)
2016–2017	Colo-Colo	28	(4)
2018–2021	O'Higgins	107	(8)
2022	Atlanta	15	(1)
2022–2023	Deportes Iquique	31	(4)
2024–2025	San Antonio Unido	27	(3)
2025	San Marcos	15	(1)
Total		540	(66)
- * Club domestic league appearances and goals

Ramón Ignacio Fernández Arias (Spanish pronunciation: [raˈmon iɣˈnasjo feɾˈnandes], born 3 December 1984) is a former Argentine-Chilean footballer who played as a midfielder.

== Club career ==
A product of Estudiantes de la Plata youth system, Fernández joined its reserve team in January 2003 but spent most of the next five years on loan at several Argentine sides, including Sarmiento, Club Sportivo Ben Hur, Defensa y Justicia and Club Atlético Atlanta, before being loaned again to the Croatian side NK Rijeka in July 2008.

At Rijeka, he established himself as a first-team regular in his first season with the club and scored one goal in 20 appearances in the 2008–09 season. At the end of the season, the club decided to renew the loan deal into the next season. Therefore, the loan spell ended in July 2010, returning to Estudiantes subsequently.

After 10 years playing in the Chilean football, in 2022 he returned to Argentina joining Atlanta where he had been a leading figure in 2008.

In June 2022, he returned to Chile and joined Deportes Iquique in the Primera B. After getting the promotion to the Chilean Primera División in 2023, he left the club.

In 2024, Fernández signed with San Antonio Unido in the Segunda División Profesional de Chile. He ended his contract in July 2025. In July 2025, he switched to San Marcos de Arica.

Once retired, Fernández joined "Colo-Colo de Todos los Tiempos" (Colo-Colo from All Time), a team made up by historical players for Colo-Colo. He confirmed his retirement on 6 June 2026.

== Personal life ==
In January 2017, Fernández acquired the Chilean nationality by residence.

His son, Valentino, has been with the Colo-Colo youth ranks.

In December 2025, Fernández joined TNT Sports Chile as a commentator for the Copa UC.

== Honours ==
Estudiantes

- Torneo de Apertura (1): 2010

Universidad de Chile

- Primera División (1): Apertura 2014
- Copa Chile: 2013

Colo-Colo

- Primera División (1): Transición 2017
- Copa Chile: 2016
- Supercopa de Chile: 2017
