= Luis Casanova (footballer) =

Chilean footballer (born 1992)

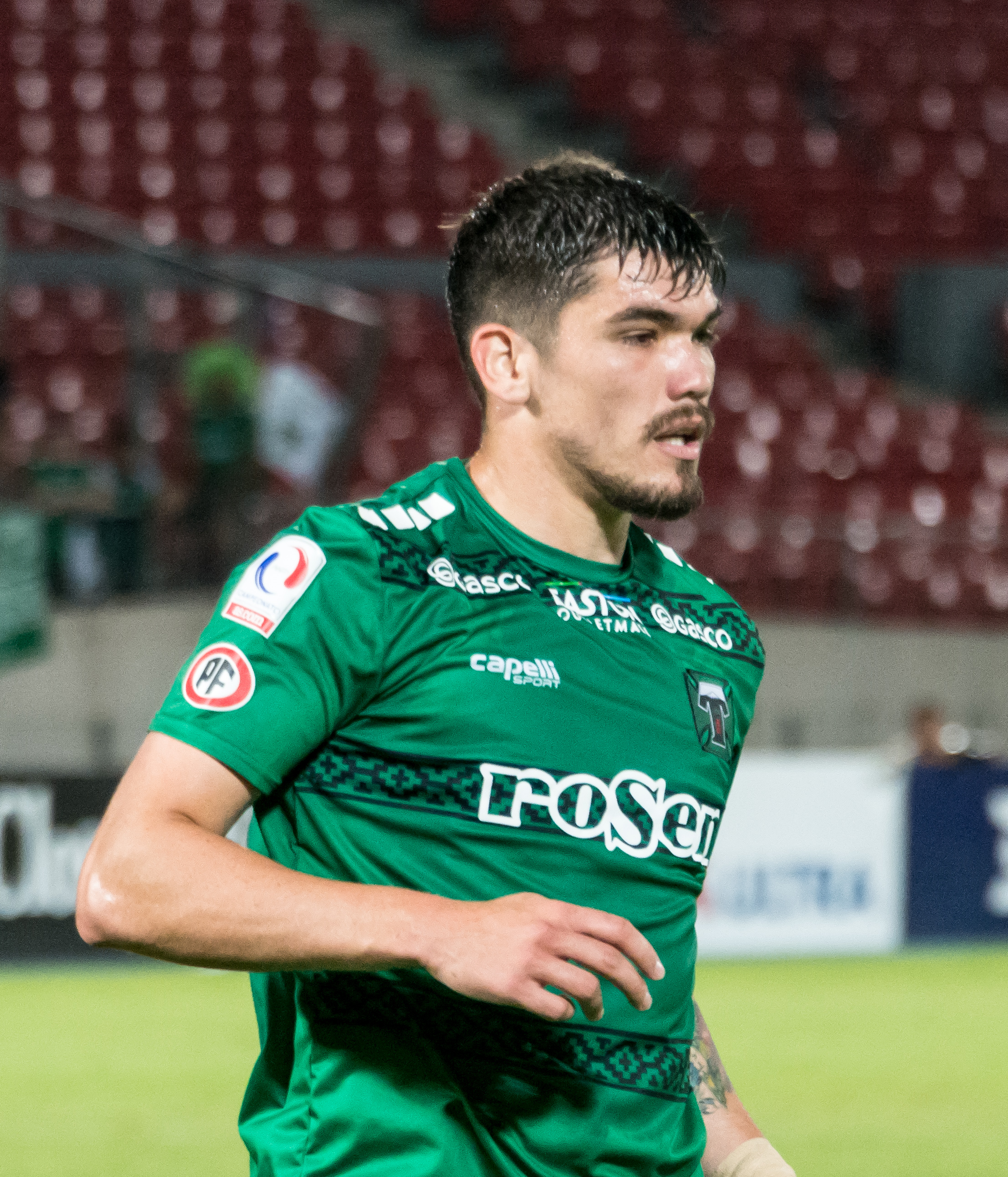
- Casanova with Deportes Temuco in 2020

Personal information
- Full name: Luis Ignacio Casanova Sandoval
- Date of birth: 1 July 1992 (age 34)
- Place of birth: Rancagua, Chile
- Height: 1.82 m (5 ft 11 1/2 in)
- Position: Centre-back

Team information
- Current team: Deportes Temuco
- Number: 28

Youth career
- O'Higgins

Senior career*
Years	Team	Apps	(Gls)
2009–2012	O'Higgins	59	(3)
2013	→ Unión Española B (loan)	3	(0)
2013	→ Unión Española (loan)	1	(0)
2013–2015	→ Unión La Calera (loan)	35	(1)
2015–2016	San Marcos	17	(2)
2016–2021	Deportes Temuco	70	(7)
2020–2021	→ Universidad de Chile (loan)	24	(0)
2021–2023	Universidad de Chile	48	(1)
2024–2025	Deportes Iquique	24	(0)
2026–	Deportes Temuco	0	(0)

International career^{‡}
2011	Chile U20	6	(0)
2011–2012	Chile U23	3	(0)
2010–2012	Chile	5	(0)
- * Club domestic league appearances and goals as of 14 December 2025 ‡ National team caps and goals as of 11 April 2012

Luis Ignacio Casanova Sandoval (born 1 July 1992) is a Chilean footballer who plays as a centre-back for Deportes Temuco.

== Career ==
In March 2021, Casanova signed with Universidad de Chile on a three-year deal after playing for them on loan from Deportes Temuco the previous season.

In 2024, Casanova joined Deportes Iquique. He left them at the end of 2025.

Casanova rejoined Deportes Temuco on 7 August 2026.

== Personal life ==
His father of the same name, Luis Casanova Sanhueza, is a former professional footballer who played for clubs such as O'Higgins, Palestino and Deportes Temuco.

== Career statistics ==
=== Club ===
Club	Season	League		Cup		Continental		Total	
Club	Season	Apps	Goals	Apps	Goals	Apps	Goals	Apps	Goals
O'Higgins	2010	26	2	0	0	–	–	26	2
O'Higgins	2011	16	1	5	0	–	–	21	1
O'Higgins	2012	13	0	0	0	0	0	13	0
O'Higgins	Total	55	3	5	0	0	0	60	3
Unión Española	2013	1	0	–	–	–	–	1	0
Unión Española	Total	1	0	–	–	–	–	1	0
Unión La Calera	2013–14	17	0	0	0	–	–	17	0
Unión La Calera	2014–15	18	1	0	0	–	–	18	1
Unión La Calera	Total	35	1	0	0	–	–	35	1
San Marcos de Arica	2015–16	17	2	0	0	0	0	17	2
San Marcos de Arica	Total	0	0	0	0	0	0	0	0
Career total		108	6	5	0	0	0	113	6

=== International ===
Chile national team
Year	Apps	Goals
2010	1 (Note: Chile 3 – 0 Israel)	0
2011	1 (Note: Chile 3 – 2 Paraguay)	0
2012	3 (Note: Paraguay 2 – 0 Chile) (Note: Chile 3 – 1 Peru) (Note: Peru 0 – 3 Chile)	0
Total	5	0

== Honours ==
Unión Española

- Primera División: 2013–T

Chile

- Copa del Pacífico: 2012
