= Guillermo Suárez =

Argentine footballer

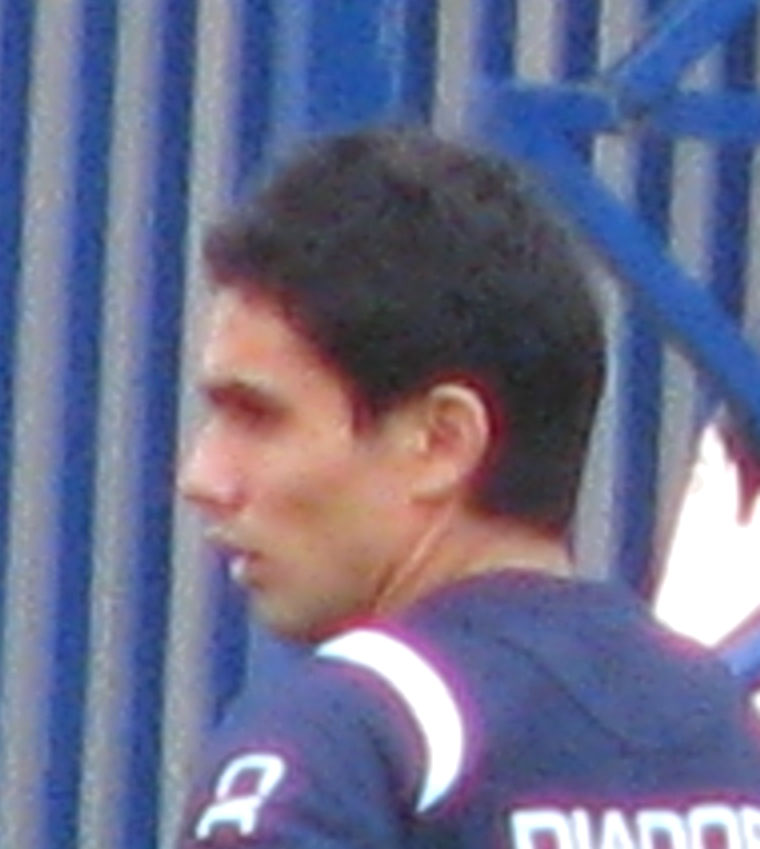

Personal information
- Full name: Guillermo Alejandro Suárez
- Date of birth: June 9, 1985 (age 41)
- Place of birth: Lincoln, Argentina
- Height: 1.72 m (5 ft 8 in)
- Position: Winger

Team information
- Current team: Coquimbo Unido
- Number: 7

Youth career
- 2001–2002: Deportivo Armenio
- 2002–2007: Rivadavia de Lincoln

Senior career*
| Years | Team | Apps | (Gls) |
| 2007–2008 | Tigre | 25 | (3) |
| 2008–2010 | Dinamo Zagreb | 4 | (0) |
| 2009–2010 | → Tigre (loan) | 21 | (0) |
| 2010 | → Inter Zaprešić (loan) | 6 | (0) |
| 2011–2014 | O'Higgins | 42 | (8) |
| 2012 | → San Martín SJ (loan) | 3 | (0) |
| 2013–2014 | → Rivadavia LCN (loan) | 2 | (0) |
| 2014 | Cobresal | 11 | (2) |
| 2014–2015 | Deportivo Morón | 10 | (0) |
| 2015 | Coquimbo Unido | 18 | (2) |
- * Club domestic league appearances and goals as of 25 May 2015

Guillermo Alejandro Suárez (born 9 June 1985 in Lincoln, Buenos Aires) is an Argentine footballer who currently plays for Coquimbo Unido as winger.

== Career ==
Suárez started his youth career with Deportivo Armenio in 2001. In 2002, he joined Rivadavia de Lincoln where he played until 2007.

Suárez joined Primera División side Club Atletico Tigre in 2007 and was part of the squad that achieved their highest ever league finish by claiming 2nd place in the Apertura 2007 tournament.

On July 3, 2008, he signed for Croatian champions GNK Dinamo Zagreb. He was then loaned back to Club Atletico Tigre for the calendar year of 2009 and then to Inter Zaprešić in 2010.
