= Nélson Saavedra =

Chilean footballer (born 1988)

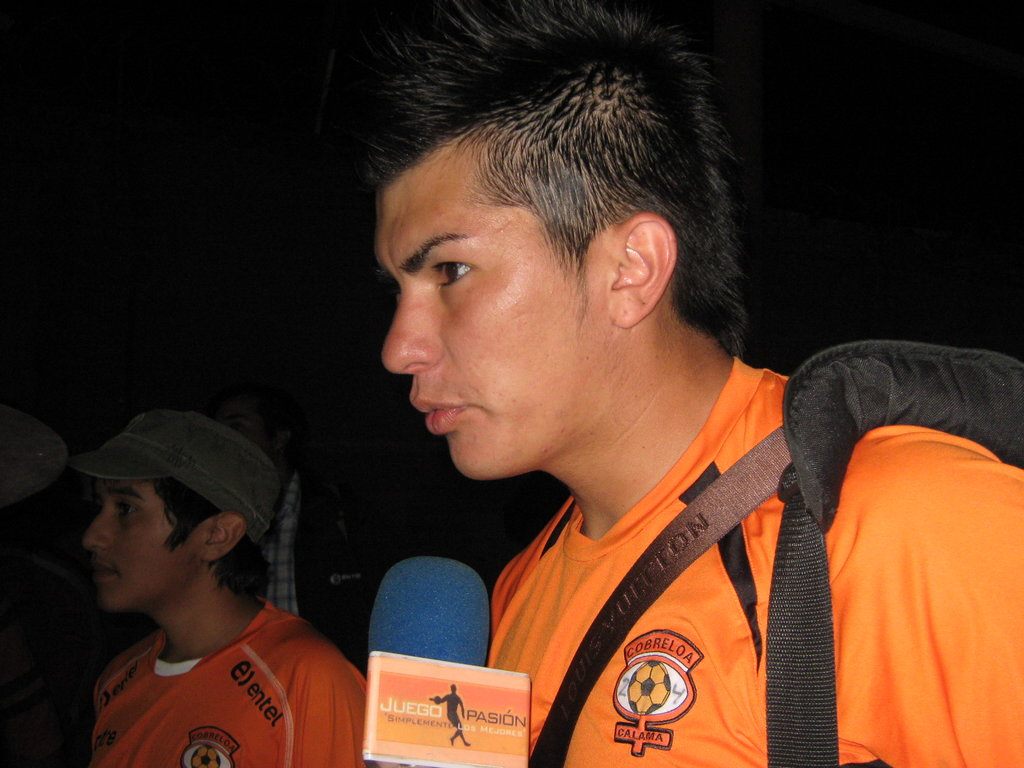
- Saavedra with Cobreloa in 2011

Personal information
- Full name: Nélson Alejandro Saavedra Sánchez
- Date of birth: 6 April 1988 (age 38)
- Place of birth: Santiago, Chile
- Position: Right back

Team information
- Current team: Punta Cana FC (coach)

Youth career
- 2004–2007: Palestino

Senior career*
Years	Team	Apps	(Gls)
2008–2009	Palestino	24	(0)
2009	→ Vitória (loan)	0	(0)
2009–2010	São Paulo	0	(0)
2010	→ Atlético Goianiense (loan)	0	(0)
2011	Cobreloa	6	(0)
2011	Unión San Felipe	13	(0)
2012	O'Higgins	27	(0)
2013–2017	Audax Italiano	37	(4)
2015–2016	→ Santiago Wanderers (loan)	11	(0)
2017–2018	Deportes Melipilla	5	(0)
2021	Atlético San Cristóbal	15	(0)
2021	Atlético Vega Real	10	(0)

International career
2009	Chile U21	3	(0)

Managerial career
- 2022–: Punta Cana FC
- * Club domestic league appearances and goals

Nélson Alejandro Saavedra Sánchez (born 6 April 1988) is a Chilean former professional footballer who played as a defender.

== Club career ==
Born in Santiago, Saavedra was trained at Palestino. As a youth player, he took part and won the reality TV show Adidas Selection Team from Fox Sports, where a squad made up by youth players from professional clubs faced players from schools, standing out future professional footballers such as Felipe Seymour, Jean Paul Pineda, Eduardo Vargas, among others. Later, he began his professional career in the 2008 season with Palestino. Saavedra went on trial with Spanish giants Real Madrid in January 2009, but a move never materialised. Instead, he moved on loan to Brazil's Vitória for the 2009 season, but after failing to appear for his new club, he signed on loan for São Paulo. Saavedra never appeared for São Paulo either, and began the 2010 season on loan at a third Brazilian club, Atlético Goianiense.

On 12 December 2012, he is signed for Audax Italiano for the 2013 season.

In August 2017, Saavedra joined Deportes Melipilla for the 2017 Transición Segunda División Profesional.

In March 2021 Saavedra signed with Dominican club Atlético San Cristóbal alongside another five Chilean players. In July of the same year, he switched to Atlético Vega Real.

== Post-retirement ==
Following his retirement, Saavedra settled in the Dominican Republic and became a coach for the Punta Cana FC football academy.
