= Nelson Rebolledo =

Chilean footballer (born 1985)

Personal information
- Full name: Nelson Arnoldo Rebolledo Tapia
- Date of birth: 14 November 1985 (age 40)
- Place of birth: Rancagua, Chile
- Height: 1.75 m (5 ft 9 in)
- Position: Left-back

Youth career
- Cobreloa

Senior career*
Years	Team	Apps	(Gls)
2005	Cobreloa	13	(0)
2006	Curicó Unido	6	(0)
2007	San Luis	14	(2)
2008–2011	Huachipato	96	(12)
2011–2015	Universidad de Chile	10	(0)
2012	→ O'Higgins (loan)	21	(0)
2013–2014	→ Deportes Iquique (loan)	20	(0)
2014–2015	→ Barnechea (loan)	13	(0)
2015–2018	Curicó Unido	81	(13)
2019	Santiago Wanderers	8	(0)
2020	Rangers	13	(0)
2021–2022	Deportes Copiapó	36	(0)
2023	Rangers	15	(0)
Total		336	(27)
- * Club domestic league appearances and goals

Nelson Arnoldo Rebolledo Tapia (born 14 November 1985) is a Chilean former football defender.

== Career ==
Rebolledo has also played for Cobreloa, Curicó Unido, San Luis Quillota and Huachipato. Among other data he scored against Colo-Colo in the Torneo Clausura 2008 at the Estadio Monumental in Santiago.

At some point also allegedly had been called to the Chile national football team.

His last club was Rangers de Talca in 2023.

== Honours ==
Universidad de Chile

- Primera División de Chile (1): 2011–C
- Copa Sudamericana (1): 2011

Deportes Iquique

- Copa Chile (1): 2013–14

Curicó Unido

- Primera B (1): 2016–17

Santiago Wanderers

- Primera B (1): 2019
