= Paulo Garcés =

Chilean footballer (born 1984)

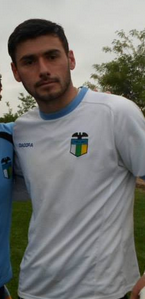
- Garcés with O'Higgins in 2013

Personal information
- Full name: Paulo Andrés Garcés Contreras
- Date of birth: 2 August 1984 (age 42)
- Place of birth: Parral, Chile
- Height: 1.81 m (5 ft 11 1/2 in)
- Position: Goalkeeper

Team information
- Current team: Buenos Aires
- Number: 12

Youth career
- 1999–2003: Universidad Católica

Senior career*
Years	Team	Apps	(Gls)
2003–2011	Universidad Católica	66	(0)
2004	→ Deportes Puerto Montt (loan)	18	(0)
2007	→ Deportes Puerto Montt (loan)	13	(0)
2008	→ Lobos BUAP (loan)	17	(0)
2008	→ Everton (loan)	6	(0)
2011–2013	Universidad de Chile	5	(0)
2011	→ Unión La Calera (loan)	0	(0)
2013–2014	O'Higgins	30	(0)
2014–2017	Colo-Colo	32	(0)
2017–2019	Deportes Antofagasta	45	(0)
2020–2021	Curicó Unido	16	(0)
2021	San Luis	6	(0)
2021–2024	Deportes Valdivia	36	(0)
2024–2025	Unión San Felipe	43	(0)
2026–	Buenos Aires	–	(–)

International career^{‡}
2011–2016	Chile	1	(0)
Medal record
Copa América
Winner	2015 Chile	Team
- * Club domestic league appearances and goals as of 11 January 2026 ‡ National team caps and goals as of 7 September 2016

Paulo Andrés Garcés Contreras (born 2 August 1984) is a Chilean footballer who plays as a goalkeeper for Buenos Aires in the Chilean Tercera B.

== Career ==
Garcés made his debut in 2003 against Santiago Wanderers in the closing championship at San Carlos de Apoquindo Stadium. He was loaned out to Deportes Puerto Montt in 2004 and 2007

After returning from the loan Deportes Puerto Montt, Universidad Católica loaned him to Lobos de la BUAP of Primera "A" of Mexican soccer. After his experience in Mexico, he returns to Chile to play in Everton de Viña del Mar team in which he was on the starting eleven sometimes. In 2009, he returns to Universidad Católica willing to win a place on the starting eleven of coach Marco Antonio Figueroa.

In 2013, he won the Apertura 2013–14 with O'Higgins. In the tournament, he played 16 matches receiving 12 goals; including the final versus Universidad Católica, where he was a key player after made saves in the final minutes.

In 2014, he won the Supercopa de Chile against Deportes Iquique, but did not play because he was called up for the Chile national team.

He participated with the club in the 2014 Copa Libertadores where they faced Deportivo Cali, Cerro Porteño and Lanús, being third and being eliminated in the group stage.

In 2021, after playing six matches for Primera B club San Luis de Quillota, he resigned. At the same year, he joined Deportes Valdivia in the Segunda División Profesional de Chile.

On 25 January 2024, Deportes Linares announced the signing of Garcés, but five days later, he gave up. He finally renewed with Deportes Valdivia. In June of the same year, he switched to Unión San Felipe until the end of the 2025 season.

In January 2026, Garcés joined his hometown's club, Buenos Aires de Parral, in the Tercera B and won the league title, getting promotion to the Tercera A.

== Personal life ==
Garcés is married with the model Joyce Castiblanco. The couple have three children: Florencia, Benjamín and Paulo.

Although his father, Patricio, was a goalkeeper, from his paternal line his relatives are mainly inclined towards arts and music: His older brother, Óscar, is an actor and former goalkeeper of Colo-Colo at youth level and both his younger brother, Miguel, and his cousins, Andrés de León (stage name of Christian Garcés) and Patricio Garcés, are singers.

== Honours ==
Universidad Católica

- Primera División de Chile: 2005–A, 2010

Universidad de Chile

- Primera División: 2012–A

O'Higgins

- Primera División: 2013–A
- Supercopa de Chile: 2014

Colo Colo

- Primera División: 2015–A

Buenos Aires

- Tercera B: 2026

Individual

- 2012 Copa Sudamericana Team of the Tournament
- 2013 Jugador Experto Easy del Año
- Medalla Santa Cruz de Triana (1): 2014
