= 2011 Torneo Apertura (Primera B de Chile) =

Primera B de Chile
- Season: 2011 Primera B
- Champions: Deportes Antofagasta

The 2011 Torneo Apertura was part of the 61st completed season of the Primera B de Chile.

Deportes Antofagasta was tournament's champion.

== League table ==
Pos	Team	Pld	W	D	L	GF	GA	GD	Pts
1	Deportes Antofagasta	19	12	4	3	26	19	+7	40
2	Rangers	19	12	3	4	31	21	+10	39
3	Deportes Concepción	19	9	5	5	27	18	+9	32
4	Naval	19	7	6	6	24	24	0	27
5	Curicó Unido	19	7	5	7	31	30	+1	26
6	Coquimbo Unido	19	7	5	7	24	26	−2	26
7	Unión Temuco	19	7	4	8	25	21	+4	25
8	San Luis de Quillota	19	7	4	8	27	25	+2	25
9	Deportes Puerto Montt	19	6	6	7	20	22	−2	24
10	San Marcos de Arica	19	6	5	8	31	30	+1	23
11	Lota Schwager	19	6	4	9	17	21	−4	22
12	Everton	19	5	6	8	21	27	−6	21
13	Magallanes	19	5	6	8	25	32	−7	21
14	Deportes Copiapó	19	5	1	13	21	34	−13	16
