= Enzo Gutiérrez =

Argentine footballer (born 1986)

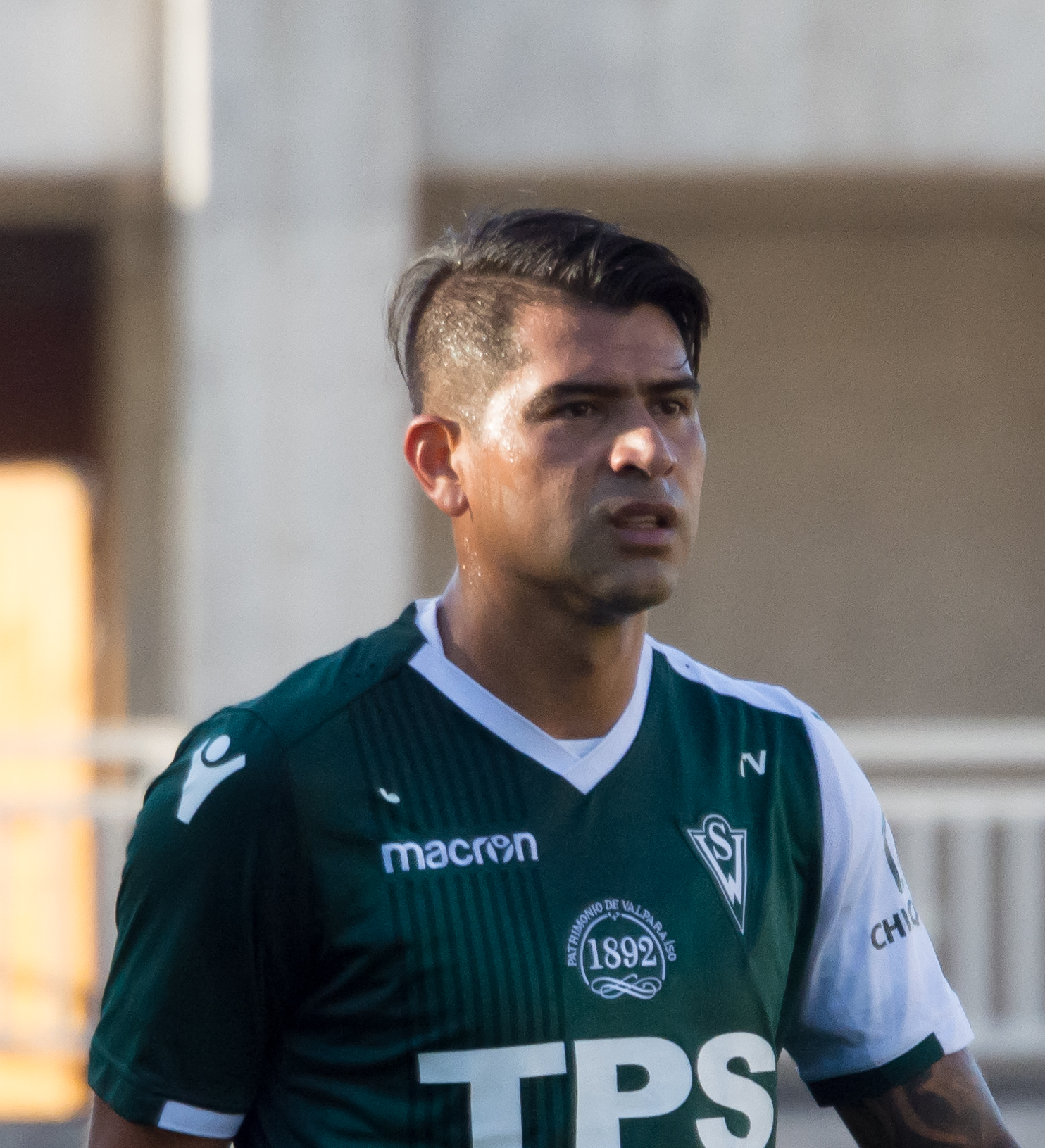
- Gutiérrez with Santiago Wanderers in 2019

Personal information
- Full name: Enzo Hernán Gutiérrez Lencinas
- Date of birth: 28 May 1986 (age 40)
- Place of birth: Charata, Argentina
- Height: 1.83 m (6 ft 0 in)
- Position: Forward

Team information
- Current team: Sarmiento La Banda

Youth career
- 1997–2005: Boca Juniors

Senior career*
Years	Team	Apps	(Gls)
2005–2007	Boca Juniors	3	(0)
2006	→ Manta (loan)	25	(5)
2007	→ Universidad San Martín (loan)	16	(2)
2008–2009	Rangers	45	(6)
2009	→ Marítimo (loan)	1	(0)
2010–2012	O'Higgins	80	(34)
2012–2016	Universidad de Chile	52	(10)
2015–2016	→ Palestino (loan)	25	(9)
2016–2017	Millonarios	15	(2)
2017–2020	Santiago Wanderers	84	(35)
2021	Universitario	11	(2)
2022	Manta	1	(0)
2025	Santiago Wanderers	5	(0)
2026–	Sarmiento La Banda	0	(0)
- * Club domestic league appearances and goals as of 11 February 2026

Enzo Hernán Gutiérrez Lencinas (Spanish pronunciation: [ˈenθo ɣuˈtjereθ], born 28 May 1986) is an Argentine footballer who plays as a forward for Sarmiento de La Banda.

== Club career ==
=== Early career ===
Gutiérrez was born at Charata, Argentina. He began his career at capital club Boca Juniors, one of the most successful club of South America and also in the entire world, where he spent eight years in the football academy, growing up with footballers like Matías Rodríguez and Fernando Gago. He made his Argentine Primera División debut on 11 June 2005 against Arsenal de Sarandí at La Bombonera. Gutiérrez under the orders of Alfio Basile as coach in that season, earned the treble, winning the league title, added to Copa Libertadores and Copa Sudamericana honours.

In January 2007, Gutiérrez joined on loan to Peruvian side Universidad San Martín de Porres, alongside his teammate and friend Gastón Cellerino, helping the team in achieve Torneo Descentralizado title and his team's qualification to 2008 Copa Libertadores. On 31 December, Enzo momentarily returned to Boca and ended his contract on 31 December.

=== Rangers ===
On 22 January 2008, Cellerino and Enzo joined Chilean Primera División side Rangers, both as a free agents. The players settled in Talca along their families, like when they played in Peru. He made his debut on 1 February in a 1–0 loss with Deportes La Serena at La Portada.

=== O'Higgins ===
Gutiérrez made his debut for O'Higgins against San Luis Quillota, coming off the bench as a substitute in the 73rd minute, replacing to Lucas Ojeda in a 2–1 away victory, and his first goal came on 17 February 2010 in a 1–0 home win over Universidad Católica.

=== Universidad de Chile ===
He joined Club Universidad de Chile during the summer transfer window in 2012.

=== Last seasons ===
Gutiérrez ended his career with Peruvian club Universitario in 2021 and Ecuadorian club Manta in 2022. He had played for Manta in 2006, scoring five goals on 25 appearances.

=== Return to play ===
Retired since 2022, Gutiérrez returned to the activity with Santiago Wanderers after naturalizing Chilean in July 2025.

Back to Argentina, Gutiérrez joined Sarmiento de La Banda in the Torneo Federal A on 7 February 2026.

== Personal life ==
Gutiérrez naturalized Chilean by residence in July 2025.

== Career statistics ==
As of match played on 21 February 2018

Appearances and goals by club, season and competition
Club	Season	League			Cup		Other		Total	
Club	Season	Division	Apps	Goals	Apps	Goals	Apps	Goals	Apps	Goals
Marítimo	2008–09	Primeira Liga	1	0	0	0	0	0	1	0
Rangers	2009	Primera División of Chile	15	4	0	0	0	0	15	4
O'Higgins	2010	Primera Division of Chile	33	13	0	0	0	0	33	13
O'Higgins	2011	Primera Division of Chile	27	10	2	0	0	0	29	10
O'Higgins	2012	Primera Division of Chile	20	11	0	0	0	0	20	11
O'Higgins	Total		80	34	2	0	0	0	82	34
Universidad de Chile	2012	Primera División of Chile	17	7	6	0	6 (Note: Four Appearances in Copa Sudamericana, Two appearances in Recopa Sudamericana)	2	29	9
Universidad de Chile	2013	Primera División of Chile	2	0	0	0	0	0	2	0
Universidad de Chile	2013–14	Primera División of Chile	11	0	0	0	3 (Note: Appearances in Copa Libertadores)	1	14	1
Universidad de Chile	2014–15	Primera División of Chile	22	3	4	1	0	0	26	4
Universidad de Chile	Total		52	10	10	1	9	3	71	14
Palestino (loan)	2015–16	Primera División of Chile	25	9	4	1	0	0	29	10
Millonarios	2016	Categoría Primera A	14	2	1	0	0	0	15	2
Millonarios	2017	Categoría Primera A	1	0	0	0	1	0	2	0
Millonarios	Total		15	2	1	0	1	0	17	2
Santiago Wanderers	2017	Chilean Primera División	14	3	7	5	1 (Note: Appearance in Relegation playoff)	1	22	9
Santiago Wanderers	2018	Chilean Primera División	27	12	1	2	5 (Note: Four appearances in Copa Libertadores, One appearance in Supercopa de Chile)	0	33	14
Santiago Wanderers	Total		41	15	8	7	6	1	55	23
Career totals			229	74	25	9	16	4	270	87

== Honours ==
Boca Juniors

- Primera División Argentina: 2005 Apertura, 2006 Clausura
- Copa Sudamericana: 2005
- Recopa Sudamericana: 2005

Universidad de San Martín

- Peruvian Primera División: 2007 Descentralizado

Universidad de Chile

- Copa Chile: 2012–13
- Primera División de Chile: 2014 Apertura

Santiago Wanderers

- Copa Chile: 2017
- Primera B: 2019
