= Claudio Meneses =

Chilean footballer (born 1988)

Personal information
- Full name: Claudio Andrés Meneses Cordero
- Date of birth: 5 February 1988 (age 38)
- Place of birth: La Serena, Chile
- Height: 1.76 m (5 ft 9 in)
- Positions: Left back; centre back

Team information
- Current team: Magallanes
- Number: 22

Youth career
- 2007–2008: Deportes La Serena

Senior career*
Years	Team	Apps	(Gls)
2008–2011	Deportes La Serena	48	(1)
2012–2016	O'Higgins	47	(0)
2014–2015	→ Audax Italiano (loan)	32	(0)
2015–2016	→ San Luis (loan)	22	(0)
2016–2017	Pahang	8	(0)
2017	Deportes La Serena	5	(0)
2018	Barnechea	17	(0)
2019	Unión La Calera	6	(0)
2020–2021	Barnechea	24	(1)
2021–2022	San Luis	54	(4)
2023	Santiago Wanderers	31	(1)
2024–2025	Curicó Unido	41	(1)
2026–	Magallanes	0	(0)
- * Club domestic league appearances and goals as of 3 February 2026

Claudio Andrés Meneses Cordero (Spanish pronunciation: [ˈklawðjo anˈdɾes meˈneses]; born 5 February 1988) is a Chilean footballer who plays as a defender for Magallanes.

== Career ==
In 2012, Meneses was runner-up with O'Higgins, after lose the final against Universidad de Chile in the penalty shoot-out.

In 2013, he won the Apertura 2013-14 with O'Higgins. In the tournament, he played in 11 of 18 matches.

In 2021, he joined San Luis de Quillota.

For the 2024 season he signed with Curicó Unido from Santiago Wanderers.

In February 2026, Meneses joined Magallanes.

== Honours ==
O'Higgins

- Primera División: 2013–A

Individual

- Medalla Santa Cruz de Triana: 2014
