= Luis Pedro Figueroa =

Chilean footballer (born 1983)

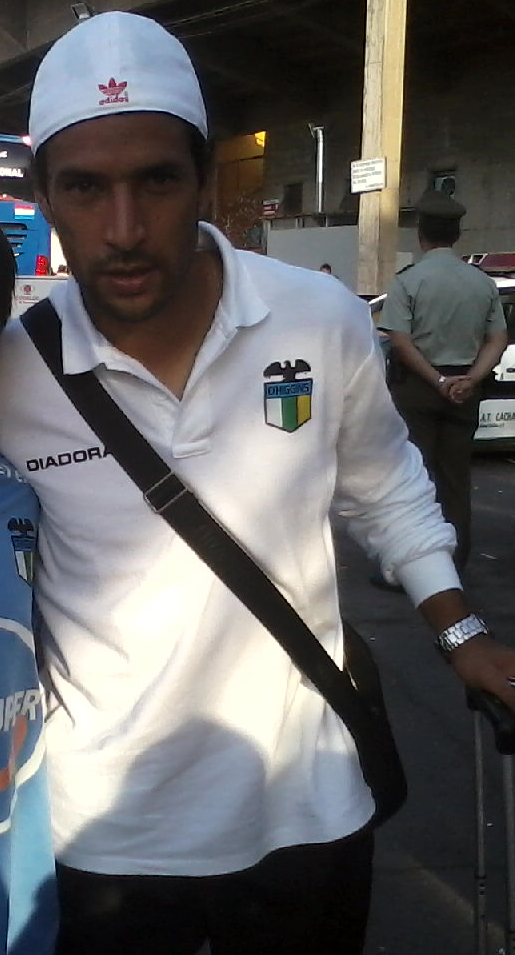
- Figueroa with O'Higgins in 2014

Personal information
- Full name: Luis Pedro Figueroa Sepúlveda
- Date of birth: May 14, 1983 (age 43)
- Place of birth: San Pedro de la Paz, Chile
- Height: 1.79 m (5 ft 10 in)
- Position: Midfielder

Youth career
- Universidad de Concepción

Senior career*
Years	Team	Apps	(Gls)
2002–2005	Universidad de Concepción	52	(8)
2005–2006	Universidad de Chile	40	(10)
2007	Arsenal de Sarandí	7	(1)
2007	Banfield	3	(0)
2008	Cobreloa	20	(3)
2008–2009	Colo-Colo	31	(6)
2009–2010	Palmeiras	13	(1)
2010–2011	Unión Española	19	(0)
2011	Olhanense	10	(1)
2012–2014	O'Higgins	85	(11)
2015–2017	Colo-Colo	42	(1)
2018–2019	Universidad de Concepción	20	(1)
2020–2021	Coquimbo Unido	20	(0)
Total		362	(43)

International career
2003	Chile U20	4	(0)
2004	Chile U23	7	(1)
2004–2013	Chile	16	(1)
- * Club domestic league appearances and goals

Luis Pedro Figueroa Sepúlveda (born May 14, 1983) is a Chilean former footballer who played as a midfielder.

== Club career ==
He was born in Concepción, and made his debut for U. de Concepción in 2002 (just 18 years old) and was bought by Universidad de Chile in 2005. In 2007, he signed for the Argentine club Club Atlético Banfield before returning to Chile in 2008 to play for Cobreloa. He then moved to Colo-Colo to play in the Clausura 2008.

=== Palmeiras ===
After playing against Palmeiras twice in the group stage of the Copa Libertadores 2009 he transferred to the Brazilian club in September 2009. His debut for Palmeiras was on a 2–1 win over Cruzeiro on September 24, 2009. And with good appearances with Palmeiras in 2009, Figueroa was the first choice player for right back position in the 2010 club's season. Unfortunately, Figueroa performed below it was expected from him due to leg injury in late February 2010. During recovery, Palmeiras announced the arrival of Vítor, who would be the first choice as right back following Figueroa's recovery. Palmeiras announced that they would not renew Figueroa's contract, expiring on 31 July 2010, and Figueroa moved back to Chile, this time joining Unión Española.

=== O'Higgins ===
In 2013, he won the Apertura 2013-14 with O'Higgins. In the tournament, he played in 15 of 18 matches, and scored two goals in the win 1:2 against Universidad Católica.

In 2014, he won the Supercopa de Chile against Deportes Iquique, and scored a goal at the 38 minutes in the match that won O'Higgins in the penalty shoot-out.

He participated with the club in the 2014 Copa Libertadores where they faced Deportivo Cali, Cerro Porteño and Lanús, being third and being eliminated in the group stage.

=== Coquimbo Unido ===
In 2020, he joined Coquimbo Unido for the 2020 Chilean Primera División, also playing in the 2020 Copa Sudamericana, but the Pirates were relegated to the Primera B for the 2021 season.

In June 2021, he announced his retirement from the football activity after having played for 22 years.

== International career ==
Figueroa represented Chile U20 at the 2003 South American U-20 Championship and Chile U23 at the 2004 CONMEBOL Pre-Olympic Tournament. At senior level, he debuted in the national Chilean team in 2004 during the Copa América 2004 in Peru. Figueroa has also played friendlies during the 2006 and he scored his first goal for Chile against Paraguay (3–2 victory).

=== International goals ===
#	Date	Venue	Opponent	Score	Result	Competition
1.	16 November 2006	Estadio Sausalito, Viña del Mar	Paraguay	3–2	Win	Friendly

== Coaching career ==
In November 2024, Figueroa took in charge a football academy based in Machalí, Chile, of Brazilian club Palmeiras.

== Honours ==
Colo-Colo

- Primera División (3): 2008 Clausura, 2015 Apertura, 2017 Transición
- Copa Chile: 2016
- Supercopa de Chile: 2017

O'Higgins

- Primera División (1): Apertura 2013-14
- Supercopa de Chile: 2014

Individual

- Primera División Ideal Team: 2013–14
- Medalla Santa Cruz de Triana: 2014
