= Yerson Opazo =

Chilean footballer (born 1984)

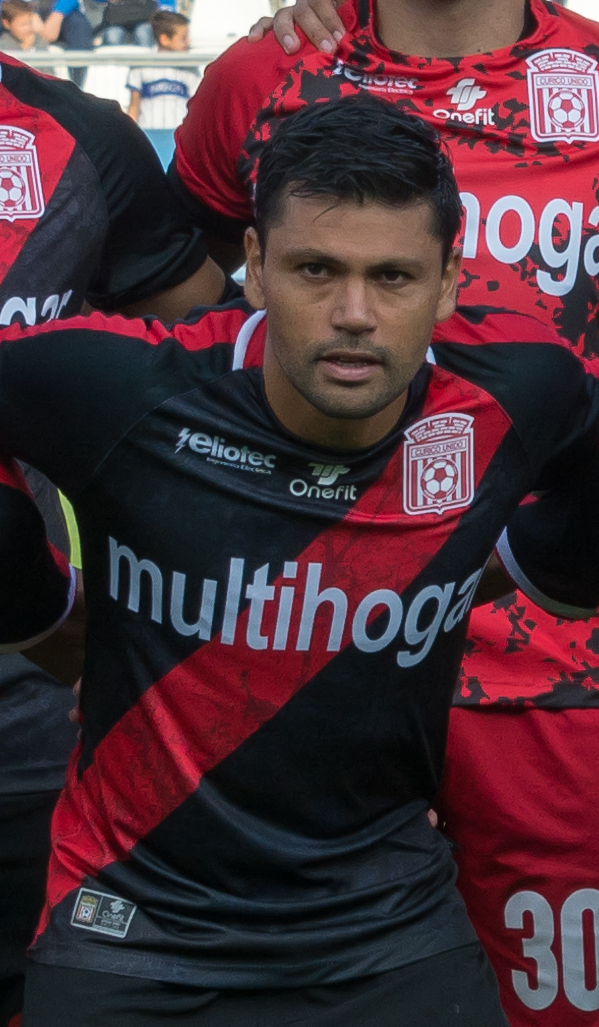
- Opazo with Curicó Unido in 2019.

Personal information
- Full name: Yerson Flavio Opazo Riquelme
- Date of birth: 24 December 1984 (age 41)
- Place of birth: Villarrica, Chile
- Height: 1.78 m (5 ft 10 in)
- Positions: Right-back; right midfielder

Youth career
- Universidad de Chile

Senior career*
Years	Team	Apps	(Gls)
2005–2007	Universidad de Chile	16	(0)
2005	→ Deportes La Serena (loan)	21	(0)
2008	Deportes La Serena	34	(0)
2009	Colo Colo	7	(0)
2009–2017	O'Higgins	211	(4)
2015–2016	→ Huachipato (loan)	26	(0)
2017	San Luis	5	(0)
2018–2022	Curicó Unido	86	(0)
2023	Deportes Santa Cruz	30	(2)
2024	Vicente Pérez Rosales	–	(–)
Total		436	(6)

International career
2012	Chile	1	(0)
- * Club domestic league appearances and goals

Yerson Flavio Opazo Riquelme (born 24 December 1984) is a former Chilean footballer who played as right-back or right midfielder.

== Club career ==
=== Universidad de Chile ===
Opazo began his career at Chilean club, Universidad de Chile. After of play many years in the youth teams of this club, he was promoted to the first team in January 2005 and then was loaned to Deportes La Serena in June of that year. With the 'papayas', he was a key player in the starting XI, so that did reach the semi-finals against Universidad Católica, thanks to the good performance of the team.

For the next season, Opazo returned to Universidad de Chile, but he was on many occasions at the bench, because the experimentates players Waldo Ponce and Julio Moreyra played in his position as frequency players in the team's lineup. In the 2006 Clausura, second semestral tournament, Opazo scored his first competitive goal in his career, in a 2–0 win over Santiago Wanderers on 22 October, scoring the first goal of the game at 14th minute. In 2007, he had an opaque moment in his career and his life, he only played 3 games for the Apertura tournament and protagonizated a scandal with his team-mate Mauricio Pinilla at a disco, being fired the next day Pinilla and Opazo by the coach Jorge Socías.

=== Deportes La Serena ===
After one semester without football activity, Opazo was signed by Deportes La Serena, club in where completed a good season in the Clausura 2005 tournament. On 26 January 2008, he made his club debut for a league game against Audax Italiano in a 0–0 away draw at Estadio Monumental. He completed a good season at Serena, playing all games of his club and contributing much at the scheme of the coach Víctor Hugo Castañeda. Because his performance, this made that Yerson would have a chance of be transferred to Colo-Colo, rival of his former club Universidad de Chile.

=== Colo-Colo ===
On 31 December 2008, it was confirmed that Opazo joined Colo-Colo for play the national tournament and the 2009 Copa Libertadores. However, he suffered an injury that made miss to the player the first games of the season, Yerson including only played 7 games in his stady, being after fired by the coach Hugo Tocalli.

=== O'Higgins ===
In 2012, Opazo was runner-up with O'Higgins, after lose the final against Universidad de Chile in the penalty shoot-out, and he was selected as the best right back of the tournament and the year.

In 2013, he won the Apertura 2013-14 with O'Higgins. In the tournament, he played in 16 of 18 matches. In 2014, he won the Supercopa de Chile against Deportes Iquique.

He participated with the club in the 2014 Copa Libertadores where they faced Deportivo Cali, Cerro Porteño and Lanús, being third and being eliminated in the group stage. In the tournament, Opazo scored two goals, both against Deportivo Cali.

=== Deportes Santa Cruz ===
Opazo played for Deportes Santa Cruz in the 2023 Primera B. In February 2024, he announced his retirement from football.

=== 2024 Copa Chile ===
In June 2024, Opazo played for club Vicente Pérez Rosales from Puerto Montt at the Copa Chile in the 0–3 loss against Universidad de Concepción.

== Career statistics ==
=== Club ===
As of 16 January 2015

Club	Season	League			Copa Chile		Supercopa		Continental		Total	
Club	Season	Division	Apps	Goals	Apps	Goals	Apps	Goals	Apps	Goals	Apps	Goals
O'Higgins	2009	Primera División	6	0	0	0	—				6	0
O'Higgins	2010	Primera División	31	0	2	0	—				33	0
O'Higgins	2011	Primera División	37	1	5	0	—				42	1
O'Higgins	2012	Primera División	36	1	5	0	—		2 (Note: Appearances in the Copa Sudamericana)	0	43	1
O'Higgins	2013	Primera División	17	0	—						17	0
O'Higgins	2013–14	Primera División	27	2	10	0	1	0	5 (Note: Appearances in the Copa Libertadores)	2	43	4
O'Higgins	2014–15	Primera División	17	0	3	0	—				20	0
Career total			171	4	25	0	1	0	7	2	204	6

== Honours ==
O'Higgins

- Primera División: 2013 Apertura
- Supercopa de Chile: 2014

Individual

- Medalla Santa Cruz de Triana: 2014
