= Julio Barroso =

Argentine naturalized Chilean football defender

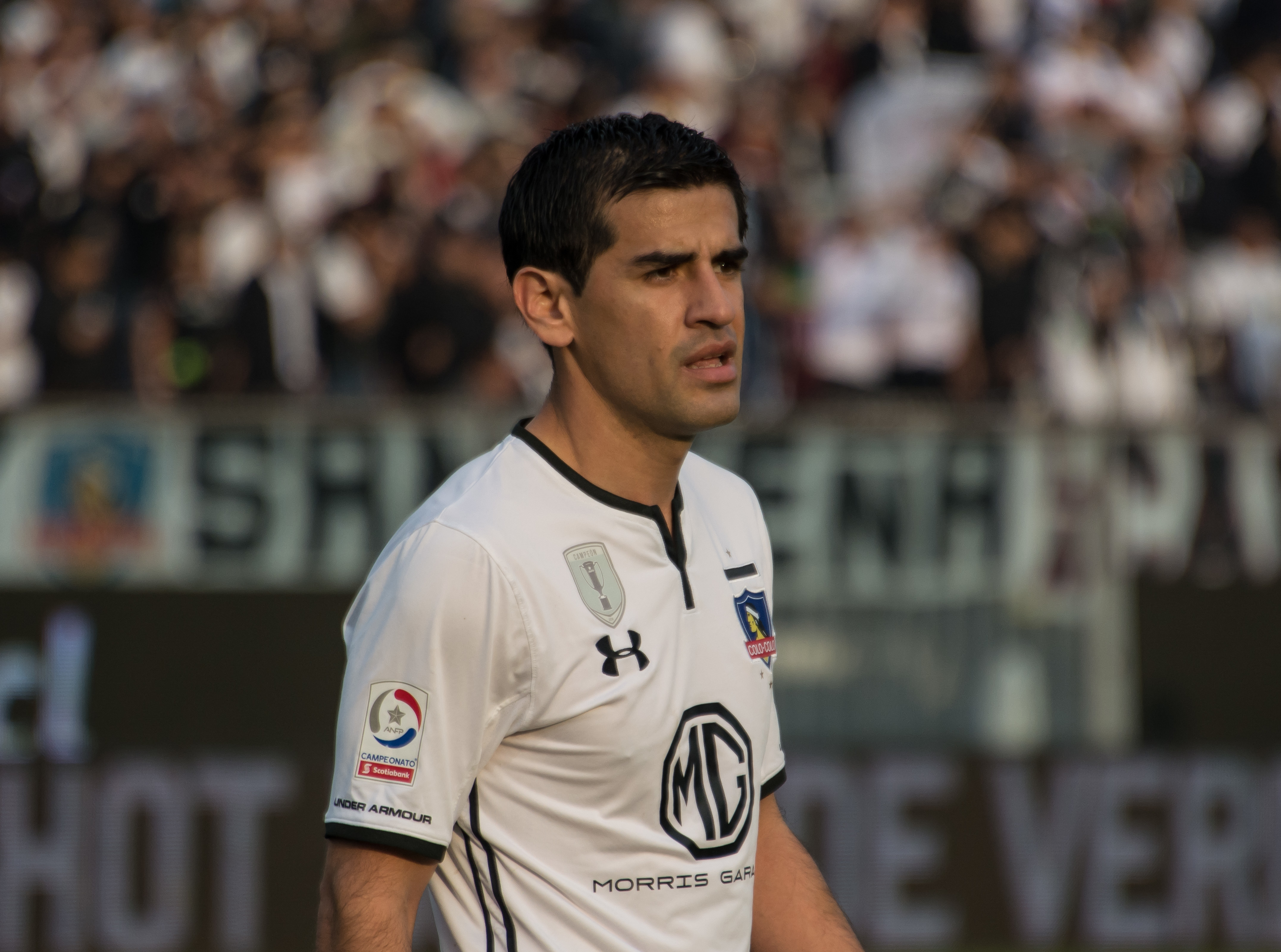
- Barroso with Colo-Colo in 2018.

Personal information
- Full name: Julio Alberto Barroso
- Date of birth: January 16, 1985 (age 41)
- Place of birth: San Martín, Argentina
- Height: 1.75 m (5 ft 9 in)
- Position: Defender

Youth career
- Argentinos Juniors
- 2005–2006: Boca Juniors

Senior career*
Years	Team	Apps	(Gls)
2003–2005	Argentinos Juniors	6	(1)
2005–2011	Boca Juniors	12	(0)
2006	→ Racing Club (loan)	21	(0)
2007	→ Lorca (loan)	11	(2)
2007–2008	→ Estudiantes (loan)	9	(2)
2010–2011	→ Ñublense (loan)	29	(1)
2011–2012	Ñublense	15	(0)
2012	→ O'Higgins (loan)	20	(0)
2012–2013	O'Higgins	50	(2)
2014–2021	Colo-Colo	162	(5)
2021–2023	Everton Viña del Mar	75	(0)
Total		410	(13)

International career
2005	Argentina U20	15	(1)

Managerial career
- 2025–: Everton Viña del Mar (youth)
- 2025: Everton Viña del Mar (assistant)
- 2026: Everton Viña del Mar (assistant)
Medal record
Representing Argentina
Men's Football
FIFA U-20 World Cup
Winner	2005 Netherlands	U-20 Team
- * Club domestic league appearances and goals

Julio Alberto Barroso (born 16 January 1985 in San Martín, Argentina) is an Argentine football manager and former player who played as a defender. He is the manager of the Everton de Viña del Mar under-21 team.

Barroso also holds Chilean nationality.

== Career ==
=== Argentina, Spain and Ñublense ===
Barroso has played for a number of teams in his early years, like Argentinos Juniors, Boca Juniors, Racing Club, Estudiantes, including a spell in Spain with Lorca and his first experience in Chile with Ñublense.

Barroso was part of the Argentina under-20 team that won the FIFA World Youth Championship in 2005.

=== O'Higgins ===
On 2012, Barroso is signed for O'Higgins from Ñublense. In 2012, he was runner-up with O'Higgins, after lose the final against Universidad de Chile in the penalty shoot-out.

In 2013, he won the Apertura 2013-14 with O'Higgins. In the tournament, he played in 16 of 18 matches, and scored one goal in the match that finished 4:3 against Rangers de Talca.

=== Colo-Colo ===
For the Clausura 2013-14, Barroso is signed for Colo-Colo for a US$1.1M fee.

In August 2014, it was reported that the Football Federation of Chile had approached the player with a view to representing the Chile national football team, but it was found he was ineligible due his participation at the 2005 FIFA World Cup Youth Championship prior to gaining citizenship.

=== Everton ===
Having spent three seasons with Everton de Viña del Mar, Barroso retired from professional football after playing the penultimate matchday of the 2023 season against O'Higgins on 2 December.

== Coaching career ==
Following his retirement, Barroso continued with Everton de Viña del Mar as both coach of the reserve youth team and assistant coach of Gustavo Leal.

== Personal life ==
In April 2017, Barroso naturalized Chilean by residence, freeing up a spot as an international player in the Chilean football.

Barroso is the cousin of the singer Ariel Puchetta, the frontman of the Argentine cumbia band Ráfaga.

== Honours ==
Boca Juniors

- Primera División Argentina (1): 2008 Apertura

O'Higgins

- Primera División de Chile (1): 2013 Apertura

Colo-Colo

- Primera División de Chile (3): 2014–C, 2015–A, Transición 2017
- Copa Chile (1): 2016
- Supercopa de Chile (2): 2017, 2018

Individual

- Medalla Santa Cruz de Triana: 2014

=== International ===
FIFA World Youth Championship

- FIFA World Youth Championship: 2005
