= 2013–14 Colo-Colo season =

Colo-Colo
2013–14 season
- Chairman: Arturo Salah
- Manager: Gustavo Benítez (until October 2013); Héctor Tapia
- 2013 Apertura: 8th
- 2014 Clausura: Winners
- Copa Sudamericana: 2nd Round
- Copa Chile: Round of 16
- Top goalscorer: League: Esteban Paredes (16 goals); All: Esteban Paredes (16 goals)
- Highest home attendance: 41,275 vs Santiago Wanderers (13 April 2014)
- Lowest home attendance: 6,090 vs Unión San Felipe (2 July 2013)
- Average home league attendance: 19,984
- Biggest win: 5–1 vs Unión La Calera (9 March 2014)
- Biggest defeat: 0–4 vs Audax Italiano (28 July 2013)
Home colours	Away colours

The 2013-14 season was Club Social y Deportivo Colo-Colo's 83rd season in the Chilean Primera División. This article shows player statistics and all official matches that the club played during the 2013–14 season, which covers the period from 1 July 2013 to 30 June 2014.

== Competitions ==
=== Torneo Apertura ===
==== League table ====
Pos	Team	Pld	W	D	L	GF	GA	GD	Pts	Qualification
6	Iquique	17	7	5	5	22	21	+1	26	Pre-libertadores Liguilla
7	Ñublense	17	7	3	7	28	28	0	24	
8	Colo-Colo	17	7	3	7	22	23	−1	24	
9	Cobresal	17	7	3	7	18	25	−7	24	
10	Cobreloa	17	6	5	6	19	18	+1	23	

==== Results summary ====
Overall								Home						Away					
Pld	W	D	L	GF	GA	GD	Pts	W	D	L	GF	GA	GD	W	D	L	GF	GA	GD
17	7	3	7	22	23	−1	24	5	0	3	13	8	+5	2	3	4	9	15	−6

Source: cdf.cl

==== Result round by round ====
Round	1	2	3	4	5	6	7	8	9	10	11	12	13	14	15	16	17
Ground	A	H	A	H	A	H	A	H	A	H	H	A	A	H	A	A	H
Result	L	L	D	W	D	L	W	L	L	W	W	W	L	W	D	L	W
Position	18	18	17	14	14	17	13	14	16	12	11	9	12	9	10	12	8

Source: cdf.cl
A = Away; H = Home; W = Win; D = Draw; L = Loss

==== Matches ====
28 July 2013 1	Audax Italiano	4–0	Colo-Colo	La Florida, Santiago
15:30	Arias (red card) 26'; Carrasco 48', 81'; Mora 75'; Canuhé 79' (pen.)	Report	Domínguez (red card) 78'	Stadium: Estadio Bicentenario de La Florida; Attendance: 7,089; Referee: Roberto Tobar

4 August 2013 2	Colo-Colo	0–1	Everton	Macul, Santiago
18:00		Report	Romero (red card) 30'; Lescano 68'	Stadium: Estadio Monumental; Attendance: 12,552; Referee: Carlos Ulloa

11 August 2013 3	Deportes Antofagasta	1–1	Colo-Colo	Antofagasta
15:30	Canío 65'	Report	Vecchio 83'	Stadium: Estadio Regional Calvo y Bascuñán; Attendance: 18,000; Referee: Jorge Osorio

18 August 2013 4	Colo-Colo	4–1	Deportes Iquique	Macul, Santiago
18:00	Fierro 18'; Fuenzalida 44'; Vecchio 45'; Flores 89'	Report	Bogado 1'	Stadium: Estadio Monumental; Attendance: 12,464; Referee: Enrique Osses

25 August 2013 5	Huachipato	0–0	Colo-Colo	Talcahuano
15:30		Report		Stadium: Estadio CAP; Attendance: 7,647; Referee: Roberto Tobar

1 September 2013 6	Colo-Colo	0–2	Unión Española	Macul, Santiago
16:00		Report	Vidal 24'; G. Canales 55'	Stadium: Estadio Monumental; Attendance: 11,023; Referee: Claudio Puga

14 September 2013 7	Rangers	0–3	Colo-Colo	Talca
15:30		Report	Fierro 16' (red card) 53'; N. Canales 44'; E. Pavez 89'	Stadium: Estadio Fiscal; Attendance: 4,998; Referee: Roberto Tobar (injured) Source; Fourth official: Rafael Troncoso (substituted in) 37'

21 September 2013 8	Colo-Colo	0–1	Palestino	Macul, Santiago
17:30		Report	D. Cháves 74'	Stadium: Estadio Monumental; Attendance: 14,254; Referee: Jorge Osorio

28 September 2013 9	Cobresal	3–1	Colo-Colo	El Salvador
15:30	Cantero 63'; Torres 72'; Fuentes 82'	Report	N. Canales 2'	Stadium: Estadio El Cobre; Attendance: 2,490; Referee: Claudio Aranda

6 October 2013 10	Colo-Colo	2–0	Unión La Calera	Macul, Santiago
18:30	Toledo 4'; N. Canales 36'	Report	Casanova (red card) 90+1'	Stadium: Estadio Monumental; Attendance: 10,031; Referee: Enrique Osses

20 October 2013 11	Colo-Colo	2–1	Cobreloa	Macul, Santiago
18:30	Hernández 21'; Flores 90+1'	Report	J. Chávez 61'	Stadium: Estadio Monumental; Attendance: 11,998; Referee: Eduardo Gamboa

26 October 2013 12	O'Higgins	2–3	Colo-Colo	Independencia, Santiago
15:30	Calandria 69'; Pizarro 75'	Report	Fierro 16'; Vecchio 32'; Fuenzalida 35'	Stadium: Estadio Santa Laura; Attendance: 7,942; Referee: Julio Bascuñán

1 November 2013 13	Universidad de Concepción	4–1	Colo-Colo	Talcahuano
17:30	Vargas 11' (pen.); Ruiz 14', 31'; Cabral 90+2'	Report	Fuenzalida 69'	Stadium: Estadio CAP; Attendance: 8,200; Referee: Manuel Acosta

10 November 2013 14	Colo-Colo	3–2	Universidad de Chile	Macul, Santiago
12:00	E. Pavez 8'; Delgado 51'; Flores 89'	Report	Aránguiz 38' (pen.); Fernández 72'	Stadium: Estadio Monumental; Attendance: 30,534; Referee: Jorge Osorio

24 November 2013 15	Santiago Wanderers	0–0	Colo-Colo	Quillota
16:00		Report		Stadium: Estadio Lucio Fariña; Attendance: 5,904; Referee: Enrique Osses

1 December 2013 16	Universidad Católica	1–0	Colo-Colo	Las Condes, Santiago
12:00	Sosa 50'	Report	Vilches (red card) 71'	Stadium: Estadio San Carlos de Apoquindo; Attendance: 11,050; Referee: Jorge Osorio

8 December 2013 17	Colo-Colo	2–0	Ñublense	Macul, Santiago
18:30	Vecchio 2'; Flores 15'	Report		Stadium: Estadio Monumental; Attendance: 16,963; Referee: Julio Bascuñán

=== Torneo Clausura ===
==== League table ====
Pos	Team	Pld	W	D	L	GF	GA	GD	Pts	Qualification
1	Colo-Colo	17	13	3	1	45	20	+25	42	Champions & 2015 Copa Libertadores group stage
2	Universidad Católica	17	10	3	4	32	19	+13	33	
3	O'Higgins	17	8	6	3	20	12	+8	30	
4	Universidad de Concepción	17	7	6	4	20	17	+3	27	Pre-Sudamericana Liguilla
5	Palestino	17	7	5	5	25	20	+5	26	Pre-Sudamericana Liguilla

==== Results summary ====
Overall								Home						Away					
Pld	W	D	L	GF	GA	GD	Pts	W	D	L	GF	GA	GD	W	D	L	GF	GA	GD
17	13	3	1	45	20	+25	42	6	2	1	21	12	+9	7	1	0	24	8	+16

Source: cdf.cl

==== Result round by round ====
Round	1	2	3	4	5	6	7	8	9	10	11	12	13	14	15	16	17
Ground	H	A	H	A	H	A	H	A	H	A	A	H	H	A	H	H	A
Result	W	W	D	W	W	W	W	W	W	W	D	W	L	W	W	D	W
Position	5	2	3	1	1	1	1	1	1	1	1	1	1	1	1	1	1

Source: cdf.cl
A = Away; H = Home; W = Win; D = Draw; L = Loss

==== Matches ====
5 January 2014 1	Colo-Colo	2–1	Audax Italiano	Macul, Santiago
19:00	Fierro 65'; Flores 90+1'	Report	Carrasco 29'	Stadium: Estadio Monumental; Attendance: 18,208; Referee: Julio Bascuñán

12 January 2014 2	Everton	0–2	Colo-Colo	Quillota
18:30		Report	Fierro 17'; Vecchio 39'	Stadium: Estadio Lucio Fariña; Attendance: 6,272; Referee: Jorge Osorio

15 January 2014 3	Colo-Colo	1–1	Deportes Antofagasta	Macul, Santiago
21:00	Valdés 9'	Report	Silva 90'	Stadium: Estadio Monumental; Attendance: 34,188; Referee: Carlos Ulloa

25 January 2014 4	Deportes Iquique	2–5	Colo-Colo	Iquique
22:00	Villalobos 64'; Zenteno (red card) 69'; Romero 90+2'	Report	Vecchio 37'; Fierro 44', 82'; Paredes 47'; Flores 55' (pen.)	Stadium: Estadio Tierra de Campeones; Attendance: 7,228; Referee: Patricio Polic

2 February 2014 5	Colo-Colo	5–3	Huachipato	Macul, Santiago
19:30	Paredes 11', 38', 61'; Vecchio 32'; Olivi 90+2'	Report	Arrué 44' (pen.); Simón 53', 90+3'	Stadium: Estadio Monumental; Attendance: 29,883; Referee: Eduardo Gamboa

9 February 2014 6	Unión Española	1–4	Colo-Colo	Independencia, Santiago
19:00	Canales 72'	Report	Valdés 9', 63'; Paredes 45+3'; Olivi 87'	Stadium: Estadio Santa Laura; Attendance: 11,750; Referee: Claudio Puga

14 February 2014 7	Colo-Colo	3–1	Rangers	Macul, Santiago
20:30	Fuenzalida 45+1'; Barroso 55'; Flores 76'	Report	Gómez 45+2'	Stadium: Estadio Monumental; Attendance: 31,893; Referee: Eduardo Gamboa

23 February 2014 8	Palestino	1–2	Colo-Colo	Independencia, Santiago
19:00	López 89' (pen.)	Report	Delgado 3'; Paredes 18'	Stadium: Estadio Santa Laura; Attendance: 11,133; Referee: Julio Bascuñán

28 February 2014 9	Colo-Colo	3–2	Cobresal	Macul, Santiago
19:00	Paredes 9'; Delgado 47'; Flores 73'	Report	Cantero 23' (pen.); Maldonado 90'	Stadium: Estadio Monumental; Attendance: 33,659; Referee: Claudio Puga

9 March 2014 10	Unión La Calera	1–5	Colo-Colo	Coquimbo
16:00	Rosales 77'	Report	Flores 33'; Paredes 43' (pen.), 80' (pen.); Pavez 57', 69'	Stadium: Estadio Francisco Sánchez Rumoroso; Attendance: 15,035; Referee: Jorge Osorio

15 March 2014 11	Cobreloa	0–0	Colo-Colo	Antofagasta
16:00		Report		Stadium: Estadio Regional Calvo y Bascuñán; Attendance: 15,250; Referee: Eduardo Gamboa

23 March 2014 12	Colo-Colo	3–0	O'Higgins	Macul, Santiago
19:30	Flores 1'; Baeza 80'; Fuenzalida (red card) 85'; Paredes 90+8' (pen.)	Report		Stadium: Estadio Monumental; Attendance: 40,583; Referee: Claudio Puga

30 March 2014 13	Colo-Colo	1–2	Universidad de Concepción	Macul, Santiago
18:30	Paredes 45+2' (red card) 90+4'	Report	P. Muñoz 54'; Monje 67'	Stadium: Estadio Monumental; Attendance: 29,516; Referee: Enrique Osses

6 April 2014 14	Universidad de Chile	0–1	Colo-Colo	Ñuñoa, Santiago
15:30	Fernández (red card) 87'	Report	Cereceda 30' (o.g.); Baeza (red card) 67'	Stadium: Estadio Nacional; Attendance: 25,689; Referee: Eduardo Gamboa

13 April 2014 15	Colo-Colo	1–0	Santiago Wanderers	Macul, Santiago
12:00	Flores 44'	Report		Stadium: Estadio Monumental; Attendance: 41,275; Referee: Cristián Andaur

20 April 2014 16	Colo-Colo	2–2	Universidad Católica	Macul, Santiago
15:30	Vecchio 3'; Flores 36'	Report	Costa 34' (red card) 41'; J.L. Muñoz 39'	Stadium: Estadio Monumental; Attendance: 21,530; Referee: Carlos Ulloa

27 April 2014 17	Ñublense	3–5	Colo-Colo	Chillán
15:30	Rojas 21'; Varas 55', 74'	Report	Paredes 38', 42', 56', 64' (pen.), 82'	Stadium: Estadio Nelson Oyarzún; Attendance: 9,021; Referee: Patricio Blanca

=== Copa Chile ===
==== Group stage ====
Group 5
Team	Pld	W	D	L	GF	GA	GD	Pts	COLO	USFE	SMOR	RANG
Colo-Colo (A)	6	4	1	1	12	5	+7	13		2–3	1–0	2–0
Unión San Felipe (A)	6	3	3	0	12	8	+4	12	2–2		2–1	1–1
Santiago Morning	6	1	1	4	3	8	−5	4	0–2	1–3		1–0
Rangers	6	0	3	3	2	8	−6	3	0–3	1–1	0–0	

Source: Cero a Cero
(A) Advanced to Knockout stage

2 July 2013 Matchday 1	Colo-Colo	2–3	Unión San Felipe	Macul, Santiago
19:30	Olivi 44', 86' (pen.)	Report	Zúñiga 11'; Jeraldino 29'; Alvarado 81'	Stadium: Estadio Monumental; Attendance: 6,090; Referee: Eduardo Gamboa

7 July 2013 Matchday 2	Rangers	0–3	Colo-Colo	Talca
17:30		Report	Muñoz 3', 22'; Fierro 14'	Stadium: Estadio Fiscal; Attendance: 3,138; Referee: Carlos Rumiano

13 July 2013 Matchday 3	Santiago Morning	0–2	Colo-Colo	Macul, Santiago
17:00		Report	Fierro 17', 90'	Stadium: Estadio Monumental; Attendance: 4,890; Referee: Carlos Ulloa

16 July 2013 Matchday 4	Colo-Colo	2–0	Rangers	Macul, Santiago
17:30	L. Pavez 65'; Fierro 87'	Report		Stadium: Estadio Monumental; Attendance: 9,965; Referee: Claudio Puga

21 July 2013 Matchday 5	Unión San Felipe	2–2	Colo-Colo	San Felipe
15:30	Figueroa 22'; Jeraldino 30'	Report	Flores 45'; L. Pavez 62'	Stadium: Estadio Municipal; Attendance: 10,000; Referee: Rafael Troncoso

25 July 2013 Matchday 6	Colo-Colo	1–0	Santiago Morning	Macul, Santiago
19:30	Delgado 15'	Report		Stadium: Estadio Monumental; Attendance: 6,882; Referee: Patricio Blanca

==== Knockout stage ====
8 September 2013 R16, 1st Leg	San Luis de Quillota	4–3	Colo-Colo	Quillota
15:30	C. Martínez 23'; Campos López 58'; Aravena 87'; Fiorina 89'	Report	Vecchio 13', 65' (pen.); Fuenzalida 32'; Olivi (red card) 90+2'	Stadium: Estadio Lucio Fariña; Attendance: 6,113; Referee: Julio Bascuñán

13 October 2013 R16, 2nd Leg	Colo-Colo	0–2 (3–6 agg.)	San Luis de Quillota	Macul, Santiago
16:30	Vecchio (red card) 82'	Report	C. Martínez 42'; Borrego 72'	Stadium: Estadio Monumental; Attendance: 8,668; Referee: Manuel Acosta

=== Copa Sudamericana ===
==== First round ====
31 July 2013 Leg 1	El Tanque Sisley (Uruguay)	0−1	(Chile) Colo-Colo	Montevideo, Uruguay
20:30 (UTC−3)	Piano (yellow card) 70'	Report	Toledo 26'; E. Pavez (yellow card) 41'; Crovetto (yellow card) 49'	Stadium: Estadio Luis Franzini; Attendance: 3,002; Referee: Péricles Cortez (Brazil)

7 August 2013 Leg 2	Colo-Colo (Chile)	2−0 (3−0 agg.)	(Uruguay) El Tanque Sisley	Santiago, Chile
21:45 (UTC−4)	Benítez 12'; Toledo 15'; Crovetto (yellow card) 25'	Report	Santucho (yellow card) 10'; Aparicio (yellow card) 26'; Fagúndez (yellow card) 44'; G. Martínez (yellow card) 72'; Moreira (yellow card) 78'	Stadium: Estadio Monumental; Attendance: 12,559; Referee: Raúl Orosco (Bolivia)

==== Second round ====
22 August 2013 Leg 1	Deportivo Pasto (Colombia)	1−0	(Chile) Colo-Colo	Pasto, Colombia
20:10 (UTC−5)	Mina 17'	Report	Flores (yellow card) 59'	Stadium: Estadio Departamental Libertad; Attendance: 5,278; Referee: Óscar Maldonado (Bolivia)

28 August 2013 Leg 2	Colo-Colo (Chile)	0−2 (0−3 agg.)	(Colombia) Deportivo Pasto	Santiago, Chile
21:00 (UTC−4)	Fierro (yellow card) 16'; Baeza (yellow card) 39'; Toledo (yellow card) 55'; Flores (yellow card) 60'	Report	Lalinde 16', 33'; Montaño (yellow card) 16'; Álvarez (yellow card) 56'; Palacios (yellow card) 65'	Stadium: Estadio Monumental; Attendance: 14,922; Referee: Silvio Trucco (Argentina)

== Squad ==
Current squad of Colo-Colo as of 22 January 2025 (edit)
Sources: Official Web Site

No.		Position	Player
1	CHI	GK	Brayan Cortés
2	CHI	DF	Jonathan Villagra
3	CHI	DF	Daniel Gutiérrez
4	URU	DF	Alan Saldivia
5	CHI	MF	Víctor Méndez
6	CHI	DF	Sebastián Vegas
7	CHI	MF	Francisco Marchant
8	CHI	MF	Esteban Pavez
9	ARG	FW	Javier Correa
10	ARG	MF	Claudio Aquino
11	CHI	FW	Marcos Bolados
12	CHI	GK	Eduardo Villanueva
13	CHI	DF	Bruno Gutiérrez
14	CHI	FW	Cristian Zavala
15	SYR	DF	Emiliano Amor

No.		Position	Player
16	CHI	DF	Óscar Opazo
17	CHI	DF	Cristian Riquelme
19	URU	FW	Salomón Rodríguez
20	CHI	FW	Alexander Oroz
21	CHI	DF	Erick Wiemberg
22	CHI	DF	Mauricio Isla
23	CHI	MF	Arturo Vidal
24	CHI	FW	Leandro Hernández
25	CHI	MF	Tomás Alarcón
27	CHI	MF	Diego Plaza
30	CHI	GK	Fernando de Paul
32	CHI	FW	Lucas Cepeda
33	CHI	DF	Javier Rojas
34	CHI	MF	Vicente Pizarro
40	CHI	DF	Nicolás Suárez
49	HAI	FW	Manley Clerveaux

Manager: Jorge Almirón

=== Coaching staff ===
Position	Name
Manager	(Paraguay) Gustavo Benítez
Assistant Manager	(Chile) Héctor Tapia
Academy team Manager	(Chile) Hugo González
Reserve team manager	(Chile) Miguel Riffo
Fitness coach	(Chile) Álvaro Saffa
Goalkeeping coach	(Chile) Marcelo Ramírez
Director of Football	(Chile) Juan Gutiérrez

=== Winter Transfers ===
==== In ====
Note: Flags indicate national team as defined under FIFA eligibility rules; some limited exceptions apply. Players may hold more than one non-FIFA nationality.

No.	Pos.	Nation	Player
—	GK	(Paraguay) PAR	Justo Villar (From Nacional)
—	MF	(Chile) CHI	Jason Silva (Loaned from Palestino)

No.	Pos.	Nation	Player
—	MF	(Paraguay) PAR	Fabián Benítez (From Audax Italiano)
—	MF	(Chile) CHI	Nicolás Crovetto (From Huachipato)

==== Out ====
Note: Flags indicate national team as defined under FIFA eligibility rules; some limited exceptions apply. Players may hold more than one non-FIFA nationality.

No.	Pos.	Nation	Player
—	GK	(Chile) CHI	Francisco Prieto (Loan to CD Mirandés)
—	DF	(Chile) CHI	Bruno Romo (Loan to Deportes Copiapó)
—	MF	(Chile) CHI	Rafael Caroca (Loaned to Deportes Iquique)
—	MF	(Argentina) ARG	Fernando De la Fuente (Returns to O'Higgins)
—	MF	(Argentina) ARG	Facundo Coria (Released)
—	DF	(Chile) CHI	Boris Rieloff (Loaned to Audax Italiano)

No.	Pos.	Nation	Player
—	DF	(Colombia) COL	Juan Guillermo Domínguez (Released)
—	FW	(Chile) CHI	Roberto Gutiérrez (to Palestino)
—	MF	(Uruguay) URU	Mathías Cardaccio (Released)
—	DF	(Chile) CHI	Leandro Delgado (Loaned to Deportes Iquique)
—	FW	(Chile) CHI	Gerson Martínez (Loaned to Deportes Iquique)
