= 2012 Campeonato Nacional Primera División =

Campeonato Nacional Petrobras
- Season: 2012
- Champions: Apertura: Universidad de Chile; Clausura: Huachipato
- Relegated: Universidad de Concepción; Unión San Felipe; Deportes La Serena
- 2013 Copa Libertadores: Universidad de Chile; Huachipato; Iquique
- 2012 Copa Sudamericana: O'Higgins; Iquique
- 2013 Copa Sudamericana: Colo-Colo
- Top goalscorer: A: Emanuel Herrera, Sebastián Ubilla and Enzo Gutiérrez (11 goals each); C: Sebastián Sáez (13 goals)

The 2012 Primera División del Fútbol Profesional Chileno season (known as the 2012 Campeonato Nacional Petrobras for sponsorship reasons) was the 81st season of top-flight football in Chile. Universidad de Chile is the defending champion. Universidad de Chile won both the Apertura and the Clausura Championships

== Format changes ==
For the 2012, the ANFP's Council of Club Presidents approved the return to the Apertura and Clausura format, with playoffs.

== Teams ==
Eighteen teams competed in the Primera División for the 2012 season, sixteen of whom returned from the 2011 season. Santiago Morning and Ñublense were relegated last season after finishing 17th and 18th overall, respectively. There were replaced by Antofagasta and Rangers, the 2011 Primera B winner and runner-up, respectively. In 2012, the Santiago Wanderers celebrated their 120th season since the teams founding in 1892.

Locations of the 2012 Primera División teams.

Team	City	Stadium	Current manager
Antofagasta	Antofagasta	Regional de Antofagasta	Gustavo Huerta
Audax Italiano	Santiago	Municipal de La Florida	Omar Labruna
Cobreloa	Calama	Municipal de Calama	Nelson Acosta
Cobresal	El Salvador	El Cobre	Luis Musrri
Colo-Colo	Santiago	Monumental David Arellano	Luis Pérez Muñoz
Huachipato	Talcahuano	CAP	Jorge Pellicer
Iquique	Iquique	Tierra de Campeones	Fernando Vergara
La Serena	La Serena	La Portada	Miguel Ponce
O'Higgins See also: 2012 O'Higgins F.C. season	Rancagua	El Teniente	Eduardo Berizzo
Palestino	Santiago	Municipal de La Cisterna	Gustavo Benítez
Rangers	Talca	Fiscal de Talca	Gabriel Perrone
Santiago Wanderers See also: 2012 Santiago Wanderers season	Valparaíso	Regional Chiledeportes	Héctor Robles
Unión Española	Santiago	Santa Laura	José Luis Sierra
Unión La Calera	La Calera	Municipal Nicolás Chahuán	Emiliano Astorga
Unión San Felipe	San Felipe	Municipal de San Felipe	Nelson Cossio
Universidad Católica	Santiago	San Carlos de Apoquindo	Mario Lepe
Universidad de Chile	Santiago	Estadio Nacional Julio Martínez Prádanos	Jorge Sampaoli
Universidad de Concepción	Concepción	Municipal de Concepción	Víctor Hugo Castañeda

== Torneo Apertura ==
The Torneo Apertura began in January and will ended on July 2.

=== Classification stage ===
The Classification Stage began in January and ended in July.

==== Standings ====
Pos	Team	Pld	W	D	L	GF	GA	GD	Pts	Qualification
1	Universidad de Chile	17	13	1	3	44	14	+30	40	Playoffs
2	O'Higgins	17	11	2	4	31	15	+16	35	Playoffs & 2012 Copa Sudamericana First Stage (Note: O'Higgins and Deportes Iquique qualified for the 2012 Copa Sudamericana as the top two teams not playing in the 2012 Copa Libertadores Second Stage.)
3	Deportes Iquique	17	10	5	2	30	14	+16	35	Playoffs & 2012 Copa Sudamericana First Stage
4	Universidad Católica	17	8	6	3	31	17	+14	30	Playoffs
5	Unión Española	17	8	3	6	38	28	+10	27	Playoffs
6	Colo-Colo	17	7	5	5	22	21	+1	26	Playoffs
7	Unión La Calera	17	6	6	5	21	18	+3	24	Playoffs
8	Cobreloa	17	7	2	8	23	25	−2	23	Playoffs
9	Huachipato	17	6	5	6	25	28	−3	23	
10	Universidad de Concepción	17	5	6	6	23	27	−4	21	
11	Santiago Wanderers	17	6	2	9	28	30	−2	20	
12	Audax Italiano	17	5	5	7	24	32	−8	20	
13	Deportes La Serena	17	5	4	8	24	33	−9	19	
14	Rangers	17	5	3	9	17	25	−8	18	
15	Palestino	17	5	3	9	14	26	−12	18	
16	Deportes Antofagasta	17	4	5	8	10	20	−10	17	
17	Cobresal	17	3	4	10	17	40	−23	13	
18	Unión San Felipe	17	2	7	8	12	21	−9	13	

Source: Asociación Nacional de Fútbol Profesional
Rules for classification: 1st points; 2nd wins; 3rd goal difference; 4th goals scored; 5th away goals; 6th red cards; 7th yellow cards; 8th draw.

==== Results ====
Home \ Away	ANT	AUD	CLA	CSL	COL	IQU	SER	HUA	O'HI	PAL	RAN	SAW	UNI	ULC	USF	UCA	UCH	UCO
Deportes Antofagasta		1–2	1–0	2–1		1–1					0–1	1–0	1–1		0–0			2–1
Audax Italiano			1–1		1–3			2–2		1–2	3–0		0–2		0–0	2–0	0–6	
Cobreloa					0–2	0–1	2–2	4–2	0–1	1–0			1–2	1–0				
Cobresal		3–1	0–1		2–2	0–4		0–2	1–0		1–0			1–4	1–1			
Colo-Colo	1–0					0–0	0–2		1–0	0–1				3–1	1–0	1–1		1–2
Deportes Iquique		1–2					3–1	1–0	1–2		2–0	2–1		3–3	4–1			2–0
Deportes La Serena	4–1	2–4		1–1					2–2			3–1			2–1		1–3	1–0
Huachipato	2–0				0–3		1–1		2–1			2–1		1–2		2–2		
O'Higgins	1–0	3–1								5–0	2–2			2–1	2–1	1–2	3–0	
Palestino	0–0			2–1		0–1	1–0	2–2				2–1	1–3			1–2	1–3	
Rangers			0–3		2–2		2–0	2–1		2–0		2–3		2–0				1–2
Santiago Wanderers		4–2	1–3	5–2	0–0				0–1				2–2		1–0	2–1		
Unión Española				6–1	4–2	1–2	5–2	1–3	0–2		2–1					2–2		4–1
Unión La Calera	0–0	1–1					3–0			1–1		2–1	1–0			1–0	0–1	1–1
Unión San Felipe			0–3					1–2		1–0	0–0		3–1	0–0			0–1	2–2
Universidad Católica	1–0		5–1	5–0		1–1	3–0				2–0				1–1		2–1	
Universidad de Chile	4–0		4–1	3–1	5–0	1–1		4–0	1–1		2–0	3–0	3–2					
Universidad de Concepción		1–1	3–1	1–1				1–1	1–3	2–0		2–5				1–1	2–0	

Updated to match(es) played on 20 May 2012. Source: Soccerway.com
Legend: Blue = home team win; Yellow = draw; Red = away team win.

=== Playoff stage ===
For all ties, the lower-seeded team play the first leg at home.

Quarterfinals
1	Universidad de Chile	2	2	4
8	Cobreloa	0	1	1
3	Deportes Iquique	3	1	4
6	Colo-Colo	3	2	5
4	Universidad Católica	0	1	1
5	Unión Española	3	1	4
2	O'Higgins	1	3	4
7	Unión La Calera	0	2	2

Semifinals
1	Universidad de Chile	0	4	4
6	Colo-Colo	2	0	2
5	Unión Española	1	1	2
2	O'Higgins	0	2	2

Final
1	Universidad de Chile	1	2	3 (2)
2	O'Higgins	2	1	3 (0)

Updated as of games played on July 2, 2012.
Universidad de Chile wins final by PK 2-0.

==== Quarterfinals ====
In the quarterfinals, the 1 seed play the 8 seed, the 2 seed play the 7 seed, the 3 seed play the 6 seed, and the 4 seed play the 5 seed.

May 27, 2012	Cobreloa	0 – 2	Universidad de Chile	Estadio Municipal, Calama
16:30 UTC−04:00			Aránguiz 8'; Rodríguez 59'	Attendance: 7,928; Referee: Claudio Puga

June 11, 2012	Universidad de Chile	2 – 1	Cobreloa	Estadio Nacional Julio Martínez Prádanos, Santiago
01:00	Henríquez 42'; Cereceda 74'		Abarca 49'; Flores (red card) 79'

May 24, 2012	Unión La Calera	0 – 1	O'Higgins	Estadio Municipal Nicolás Chahuán, La Calera
19:00 UTC−04:00		Report	Fernández 74'	Attendance: 2.790; Referee: Jorge Osorio

May 27, 2012	O'Higgins	3 – 2	Unión La Calera	Estadio El Teniente, Rancagua
18:30 UTC−04:00	Gutiérrez 52', 56', 83'		Valencia 53'; Bahamondes 89'	Referee: Eduardo Gamboa

May 23, 2012	Colo-Colo	3 - 3	Iquique	Estadio Monumental David Arellano, Santiago
15:30 UTC−04:00	Paredes 8', 50'; Olivi 90+3'	Report	Diaz 18'; Bogado 37'; Rieloff 61'	Attendance: 8,988; Referee: Claudio Puga

May 26, 2012	Iquique	1 - 2	Colo-Colo	Estadio Tierra de Campeones, Iquique
16:00 UTC−04:00	Sarabia 12'	Report	Muñoz 10'; Olivi 35'	Attendance: 8.627; Referee: Enrique Osses

May 23, 2012	Unión Española	3 – 0	Universidad Católica	Estadio Santa Laura-Universidad SEK, Santiago
20:00 UTC−04:00	Jaime 60'; Cordero 77'; Herrera 79'	Report		Attendance: 5.345; Referee: Eduardo Gamboa

May 26, 2012	Universidad Católica	1 - 1	Unión Española	Estadio San Carlos de Apoquindo, Santiago
12:30 UTC−04:00	Campos Toro 65'	Report	Vecchio 86'	Referee: Eduardo Gamboa

==== Semifinals ====
In the semifinals, the highest seed play the lowest seed, and the second-highest seed play the second-lowest seed.

17 June 2012	Colo-Colo	2 – 0	Universidad de Chile	Estadio Monumental David Arellano
20:30	Paredes 13' (red card) 61'; Rabello 47'; Ormeño (red card) 36'			Referee: Eduardo Gamboa

24 June 2012	Universidad de Chile	4 – 0	Colo-Colo	Estadio Nacional
20:30	Henríquez 8'; Fernándes 21', 82', 90'		Olivi (red card) 84'; Fierro (red card) 89'

Universidad de Chile won 4–2 on aggregate.

16 June 2012	Unión Española	1 – 0	O'Higgins	Estadio Santa Laura-Universidad SEK
21:00	Vecchio 37'			Referee: Jorge Osorio

23 June 2012	O'Higgins	2 – 1	Unión Española	Estadio El Teniente
16:00	Figueroa 12'; Rojas 59'		50' Jaime	Referee: Patricio Polic

2–2 on aggregate. O'Higgins won on away goals rule.

==== Finals ====
28 June 2012
16:00

O'Higgins	2 – 1	Universidad de Chile
Rojas 1'; López 72'		Marino 29'

Estadio El Teniente
Attendance: 11,500
Referee: Jorge Osorio

2 July 2012
15:30

Universidad de Chile	2 – 1	O'Higgins
Aránguiz 66'; Marino 90+2'		Fernández 29'
Penalties
Aránguiz (penalty scored); Díaz (penalty missed); Ruidíaz (penalty scored)	2-0	(penalty missed) Rojas; (penalty missed) Suárez; (penalty missed) Opazo; (penalty missed) Gutiérrez

Estadio Nacional
Attendance: 44,198
Referee: Enrique Osses

3–3 on aggregate. Universidad de Chile won on penalties.

=== Top goalscorers ===
Player	Club	Goals
(Argentina) Emanuel Herrera	Unión Española	11
(Chile) Sebastián Ubilla	Santiago Wanderers	11
(Argentina) Enzo Gutiérrez	O'Higgins	11

== Torneo Clausura ==
The Torneo Clausura began in July and will end in December.

=== Classification stage ===
==== Standings ====
Pos	Team	Pld	W	D	L	GF	GA	GD	Pts	Qualification
1	Colo-Colo	17	9	6	2	32	14	+18	33	Playoffs and 2013 Copa Sudamericana First Stage (Note: Colo-Colo qualified for the 2013 Copa Sudamericana as the top team not playing in the 2013 Copa Libertadores Second Stage.)
2	Universidad de Chile	17	9	6	2	32	20	+12	33	Playoffs
3	Palestino	17	9	3	5	22	18	+4	30	Playoffs
4	Deportes Iquique	17	9	3	5	24	27	−3	30	Playoffs
5	Rangers	17	8	6	3	27	19	+8	30	Playoffs
6	Huachipato	17	7	4	6	23	21	+2	25	Playoffs
7	Unión Española	17	7	3	7	28	27	+1	24	Playoffs
8	Audax Italiano	17	6	5	6	29	26	+3	23	Playoffs
9	Universidad Católica	17	6	5	6	24	23	+1	23	
10	Cobresal	17	5	7	5	22	24	−2	22	
11	Unión San Felipe	17	6	3	8	19	21	−2	21	
12	Cobreloa	17	6	2	9	23	24	−1	20	
13	Deportes Antofagasta	17	6	2	9	26	29	−3	20	
14	O'Higgins	17	5	5	7	22	27	−5	20	
15	Santiago Wanderers	17	4	7	6	27	28	−1	19	
16	Universidad de Concepción	17	3	6	8	17	28	−11	15	
17	Unión La Calera	17	2	9	6	11	18	−7	15	
18	Deportes La Serena	17	2	6	9	20	33	−13	12	

Source: Asociación Nacional de Fútbol Profesional
Rules for classification: 1st points; 2nd wins; 3rd goal difference; 4th goals scored; 5th away goals; 6th red cards; 7th yellow cards; 8th draw.

==== Results ====
Home \ Away	ANT	AUD	CLA	CSL	COL	IQU	SER	HUA	O'HI	PAL	RAN	SAW	UNI	ULC	USF	UCA	UCH	UCO
Deportes Antofagasta					1–2		2–1	3–0	2–3	0–1				2–1		2–2	2–4	
Audax Italiano	1–2			1–1		0–1	3–2		5–1			4–1		2–1				2–2
Cobreloa	3–1	1–2		3–0							0–1	2–4			2–1	4–3	0–1	3–1
Cobresal	3–1						2–2			0–1		2–1	2–1			2–2	1–2	1–1
Colo-Colo		5–1	3–1	1–2				3–0			2–2	1–1	3–0				1–0	
Deportes Iquique	2–1		1–1	3–2	0–1					2–1			2–4			3–2	0–0	
Deportes La Serena			0–0		1–1	2–3		2–1		1–1	1–1		2–1	0–1		1–3		
Huachipato		1–1	0–1	1–1		4–1				1–1	1–2		2–0		1–0		0–3	2–0
O'Higgins			1–0	1–2	1–1	0–1	2–1	2–4				1–1	1–3					4–1
Palestino		0–0	2–1		0–3				2–1		4–1			1–0	1–2			1–0
Rangers	2–2	1–0		2–0		5–0			1–2				1–0		1–0	1–0	2–2	
Santiago Wanderers	0–1					2–1	1–1	1–1		2–3	2–2			2–0			2–2	3–1
Unión Española	2–1	3–3	2–1							1–0		2–2		0–0	3–1		5–2	
Unión La Calera			1–0	1–1	1–1	1–1		0–2	0–0		2–2				1–3			
Unión San Felipe	2–1	1–3		0–0	2–1	1–2	3–0		1–1			1–0				0–1		
Universidad Católica		1–0			0–2			0–2	1–0	0–1		3–2	1–1	1–1				2–2
Universidad de Chile		2–1					5–2		1–1	3–2				0–0	2–0	0–0		3–1
Universidad de Concepción	0–2				1–1	0–1	3–1				1–0		2–1	0–0	1–1			

Updated to match(es) played on 22 September 2012. Source: Soccerway.com
Legend: Blue = home team win; Yellow = draw; Red = away team win.

=== Playoff stage ===
For all ties, the lower-seeded team play the first leg at home.

Quarterfinals
1	Colo-Colo	2	4	6
8	Audax Italiano	0	5	5
2	Universidad de Chile	0	1	1
7	Unión Española	0	4	4
3	Palestino	1	1	2
6	Huachipato	1	2	3
4	Deportes Iquique	0	0	0
5	Rangers	1	1	2

Semifinals
1	Colo-Colo	1	0	1
7	Unión Española	3	2	5
6	Huachipato	1	1	2
5	Rangers	0	1	1

Final
7	Unión Española	3	1	4 (2)
6	Huachipato	1	3	4 (3)

==== Quarterfinals ====
20 November 2012 1st Leg	Audax Italiano	0–2	Colo-Colo	La Florida, Santiago
18:00		Report	Olivi 39'; Fierro 42' (pen.); De la Fuente (red card) 90+3'	Stadium: Estadio Bicentenario; Attendance: 5,892; Referee: Jorge Osorio

24 November 2012 2nd Leg	Colo-Colo	4–5	Audax Italiano	Macul, Santiago
20:00	Millar 6'; Fierro 42'; Mena (red card) 76'; Olivi 80', 90+3'	Report	Sáez 11', 54', 62'; Arias (red card) 65'; García 71' (pen.); Mora 75'	Stadium: Estadio Monumental; Attendance: 19,762; Referee: Eduardo Gamboa

Colo-Colo won 6–5 on aggregate.

21 November 2012 1st Leg	Unión Española	0–0	Universidad de Chile	Independencia, Santiago
19:00		Report		Stadium: Estadio Santa Laura; Attendance: 9,332; Referee: Eduardo Gamboa

25 November 2012 2nd Leg	Universidad de Chile	1–4	Unión Española	Ñuñoa, Santiago
17:45	Ubilla 14'; Magalhães (red card) 67'	Report	Jaime 51'; Hernández 75'; Rubio 85', 90'	Stadium: Estadio Nacional; Attendance: 21,034; Referee: Enrique Osses

Unión Española won 4–1 on aggregate.

20 November 2012 1st Leg	Huachipato	1–1	Palestino	Talcahuano
20:30	Núñez 82'	Report	Cháves 14' (pen.)	Stadium: Estadio CAP; Attendance: 3,844; Referee: Patricio Polic

24 November 2012 2nd Leg	Palestino	1–2	Huachipato	La Cisterna, Santiago
17:45	Teuber 90+2'	Report	Villalobos 38'; Cortés 49'	Stadium: Estadio Municipal; Attendance: 1,428; Referee: Jorge Osorio

Huachipato won 3–2 on aggregate.

21 November 2012 1st Leg	Rangers	1–0	Deportes Iquique	Talca
21:15	Gómez 61'	Report	Zenteno (red card) 87'	Stadium: Estadio Fiscal; Attendance: 3,545; Referee: Claudio Puga

25 November 2012 2nd Leg	Deportes Iquique	0–1	Rangers	Iquique
20:00		Report	Reynero 90+2'	Stadium: Estadio Tierra de Campeones; Attendance: 6,109; Referee: Carlos Ulloa

Rangers won 2–0 on aggregate.

==== Semifinals ====
28 November 2012 1st Leg	Unión Española	3–1	Colo-Colo	Independencia, Santiago
19:30	Hernández 46'; Jaime 55'; Rubio 90+1'	Report	Fuenzalida 30'; Delgado (red card) 86'	Stadium: Estadio Santa Laura; Attendance: 14,233; Referee: Claudio Puga

2 December 2012 2nd Leg	Colo-Colo	0–2	Unión Española	Macul, Santiago
17:45		Report	Leal 77'; Madrid 82'	Stadium: Estadio Monumental; Attendance: 38,823; Referee: Jorge Osorio

Unión Española won 5–1 on aggregate.

29 November 2012 1st Leg	Huachipato	1–0	Rangers	Talcahuano
21:15	Villalobos 56'	Report		Stadium: Estadio CAP; Attendance: 6,071; Referee: Claudio Fuenzalida

2 December 2012 2nd Leg	Rangers	1–1	Huachipato	Talca
20:00	Llanos 90+1'	Report	Rodríguez 54'	Stadium: Estadio Fiscal; Attendance: 6,231; Referee: Enrique Osses

Huachipato won 2–1 on aggregate.

==== Finals ====
5 December 2012
19:30
1st Leg

Unión Española	3–1	Huachipato
Merlo 48' (o.g.); Jaime 60', 79'	Report	Núñez 9'

Estadio Santa Laura, Independencia, Santiago
Attendance: 14,369
Referee: Julio Bascuñán
9 December 2012
18:00
2nd Leg

Huachipato	3–1	Unión Española
González 36', 43'; Villalobos 90'	Report	Currimilla 29'
Penalties
Rodríguez (penalty scored); Villalobos (penalty missed); González (penalty missed); Cortés (penalty scored); Aceval (penalty missed); Merlo (penalty scored)	3–2	(penalty scored) Vecchio; (penalty missed) Jaime; (penalty scored) Rubio; (penalty missed) Díaz; (penalty missed) Lobos; (penalty missed) Leal

Estadio CAP, Talcahuano
Attendance: 9,026
Referee: Claudio Puga

4–4 on aggregate. Huachipato won 3–2 on penalties.

== Aggregate table ==
Pos	Team	Pld	W	D	L	GF	GA	GD	Pts	Qualification or relegation
1	Universidad de Chile	34	22	7	5	76	34	+42	73	2013 Copa Libertadores Second Stage (Note: Universidad de Chile and Huachipato are qualified for the 2013 Copa Libertadores as the Apertura and Clausura champions respectively.)
2	Iquique	34	19	8	7	54	41	+13	65	2013 Copa Libertadores First Stage
3	Colo-Colo	34	16	11	7	54	35	+19	59	
4	O'Higgins	34	16	7	11	53	42	+11	55	
5	Universidad Católica	34	14	11	9	55	40	+15	53	
6	Unión Española	34	15	6	13	66	56	+10	51	
7	Palestino	34	14	6	14	36	44	−8	48	
8	Rangers	34	13	9	12	44	44	0	48	
9	Huachipato	34	13	9	12	48	49	−1	48	2013 Copa Libertadores Second Stage
10	Cobreloa	34	13	4	17	46	49	−3	43	
11	Audax Italiano	34	11	10	13	53	58	−5	43	
12	Santiago Wanderers	34	10	9	15	55	58	−3	39	
13	Unión La Calera	34	8	15	11	32	36	−4	39	
14	Antofagasta	34	10	7	17	36	49	−13	37	
15	Universidad de Concepción	34	8	12	14	40	55	−15	36	Relegation/Promotion Playoffs
16	Cobresal	34	8	11	15	39	64	−25	35	Relegation/Promotion Playoffs
17	Unión San Felipe	34	8	10	16	31	42	−11	34	Relegated to the Primera División B
18	La Serena	34	7	10	17	44	66	−22	31	Relegated to the Primera División B

=== Relegation/promotion playoffs ===
Teams			Scores		Tie-breakers	
Team #1	Points	Team #2	1st leg	2nd leg	GD	Pen.
Universidad de Concepción	0:6	Everton	0–1	1–3	—	—
Cobresal	3:3	Barnechea	1–3	3–0	+1:–1	—

18 November 2012
16:30
1st Leg

Everton	1–0	Universidad de Concepción
Rojas 10'	Report

Estadio Sausalito, Viña del Mar
Attendance: 8,997
Referee: Enrique Osses
25 November 2012
15:30
2nd Leg

Universidad de Concepción	1–3	Everton
Ramos 62'	Report	Muñoz 44', 64'; Suazo 78'

Estadio Collao, Concepción
Attendance: 6,000
Referee: Julio Bascuñán

Everton won 4–1 on aggregate and is promoted to Primera División. Universidad de Concepción is relegated to Primera B.

18 November 2012
19:00
1st Leg

Barnechea	3–1	Cobresal
Caroca 6'; Ibáñez 58', 90+2'	Report	Vuletich 55'

Estadio Santa Laura, Santiago
Attendance: 2,139
Referee: Roberto Tobar
24 November 2012
15:30
2nd Leg

Cobresal	3–0	Barnechea
Martínez 37'; Cuéllar 54', 65'	Report

Estadio El Cobre, El Salvador
Attendance: 1,507
Referee: Claudio Puga

Cobresal won 4–3 on aggregate and remains in Primera División. Barnechea remains in Primera B.
