= Rangers v O'Higgins (2013) =

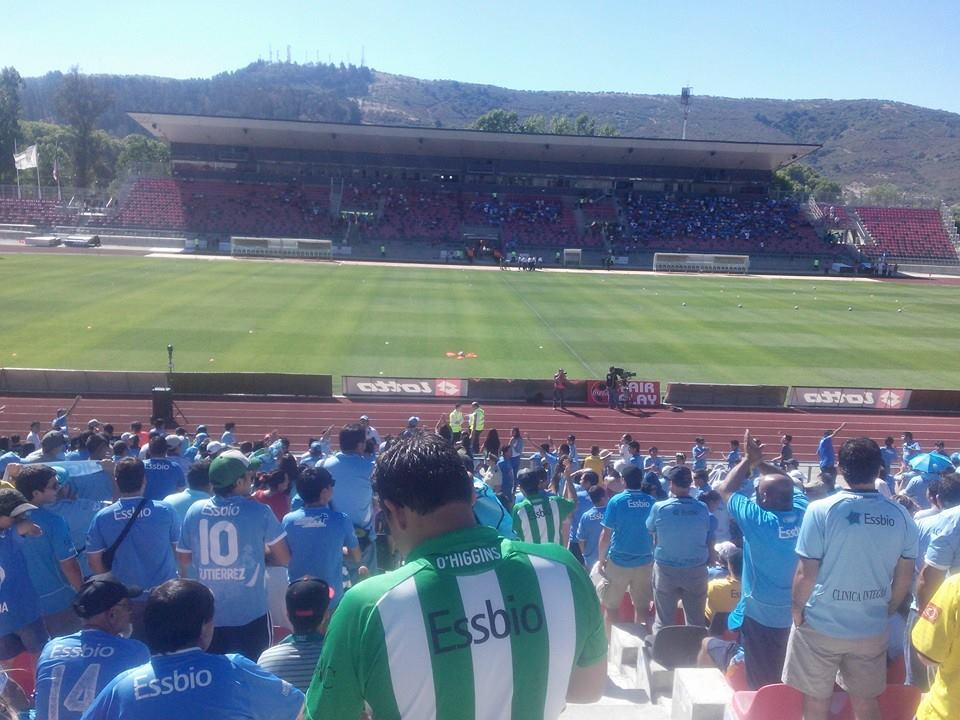
- Event: 2013–14 Torneo de Apertura Game week 17
Rangers de Talca	O'Higgins
3	4
- Date: 7 December 2013
- Venue: Estadio Fiscal, Talca
- CDF Man of the Match: Pablo Calandria
- Easy Man of the Match: Pablo Calandria
- Referee: Patricio Polic
- Attendance: 8,016
- Weather: Clear; 28 °C (82 °F)

The Rangers vs O'Higgins football match that took place on 7 December 2013 at the Estadio Fiscal in Talca, Chile, was the 17th and last game week of the 2013–14 Torneo de Apertura.

This game could determine the champion of this tournament, because at the same time Universidad Católica, the other club that could be win the league, played against Unión La Calera.

== Match ==
The last match day of the championship O'Higgins visited Rangers de Talca. The local team started winning with Mauricio Gómez goal, but O'Higgins did not give up and as in the tournament, went on to turn the game and got goals from Pablo Calandria and Julio Barroso. In the second half, it was thought that the title was slipping from the hands, because Rodolfo González and Esteban Ciaccheri put uncertainty in the Estadio Fiscal de Talca, where the score was 3–2 in favor of Piducanos.

Eduardo Berizzo, coach of the visitor, made changes and put Francisco Pizarro and Osmán Huerta on the ground, whose first ball touched overcame the Rangers' goalkeeper Nicolás Peric tying the game at three goals, leaving 10 minutes to end the match. At 88', Pablo Calandria was brought down in the area and the referee Patricio Polic charge penalty kick and expelled the goalkeeper Peric and because the team of Talca had made three modifications, the player Hugo Díaz played as the goalkeeper. At the same time, Universidad Católica was playing in parallel and winning against Unión La Calera in Quillota, so if the match was tied or lost, the championship was slipping for O'Higgins. In the 90', the Argentinian Pablo Calandria scored the goal which unleashed the madness of 4,500 fans, which completed the stadium, turning the match 4–3, right then Universidad Católica overcame 2-0 the caleranos.

So both clubs advanced to the 2013–14 Súper Final Apertura, which chooses the champion of the Torneo de Apertura 2013–14.

== Road to the last game week ==
Note: In all results below, the score of the finalist is given first (H: home; A: away). These results only considered the regular phase of the tournament (round robin), consisting of 16 matchdays played since 26 July until 7 December of 2013.

Universidad Católica		Round	O'Higgins	
Opponent	Result	Round robin	Opponent	Result
Ñublense	3-0 (H)	Matchday 1	Deportes Iquique	1-0 (A)
Unión Española	1-0 (A)	Matchday 2	Antofagasta	2-1 (H)
Universidad de Concepción	1-1 (H)	Matchday 3	Audax Italiano	1-1 (A)
Audax Italiano	1-1 (H)	Matchday 4	Everton	1-1 (H)
Palestino	6-3 (A)	Matchday 5	Santiago Wanderers	3-0 (A) ^{[note]}
Cobresal	3-0 (H)	Matchday 6	Palestino	0-1 (H)
Huachipato	4-0 (A)	Matchday 7	Ñublense	1-0 (H)
O'Higgins	1-2 (H)	Matchday 8	Universidad Católica	2-1 (A)
Deportes Iquique	2-2 (A)	Matchday 9	Huachipato	1-0 (H)
Rangers	5-1 (H)	Matchday 10	Universidad de Chile	1-1 (A)
Santiago Wanderers	2-0 (H)	Matchday 11	Universidad de Concepción	1-0 (A)
Universidad de Chile	1-0 (A) ^{[note]}	Matchday 12	Colo-Colo	2-3 (H)
Cobreloa	2-1 (H)	Matchday 13	Cobresal	4-0 (A)
Everton	2-0 (A)	Matchday 14	Cobreloa	1-0 (H)
Antofagasta	0-2 (A)	Matchday 15	Unión La Calera	2-1 (A)
Colo-Colo	1-0 (H)	Matchday 16	Unión Española	1-0 (H)

1. The match between Santiago Wanderers and O'Higgins finished with result 2:2, but the coach Ivo Basay put on the match 6 foreigners players, being punished with a 3-0 defeat against.

2. The match between Universidad de Chile and Universidad Católica was suspended and finished with the result at the last minute of the game (0:1).

=== League table ===
- Before the 17th game week of the tournament

Pos	Team	Pld	W	D	L	GF	GA	GD	Pts
1	Universidad Católica*	16	11	3	2	35	13	+22	36
2	O'Higgins*	16	11	3	2	24	10	+14	36

- After the 17 matches of the round robin

Pos	Team	Pld	W	D	L	GF	GA	GD	Pts	Qualification
1	Universidad Católica	17	12	3	2	37	13	+24	39	Súper Final (tied in points)
2	O'Higgins	17	12	3	2	28	13	+15	39	Súper Final (tied in points)

== Details ==
7 December 2013
17:30

Rangers	3–4	O'Higgins
Gómez 15' (pen.); González 56'; Ciaccheri 67'	Report	Barroso 19'; Calandria 43' (pen.), 90+1' (pen.); Huerta 78'

Estadio Fiscal, Talca
Attendance: 8,016
Referee: Patricio Polic

GK	22	(Chile) Nicolás Peric	(yellow card) 17' (yellow-red card) 89'
CB	4	(Chile) Rodolfo González (c)	(yellow card) 51'
CB	3	(Chile) Francisco Tapia	(yellow card) 90+2'
CB	6	(Chile) Carlos Garrido
RM	8	(Argentina) Sebastián Luna	(yellow card) 30' (yellow-red card) 80'
CM	5	(Chile) Marcelo Scatolaro	(substituted off) 71'
CM	21	(Chile) Hugo Díaz	(yellow card) 36'
LM	26	(Chile) Jorge Valenzuela
AM	20	(Argentina) Sebastián Sciorilli	(substituted off) 84'
CF	9	(Argentina) Pablo Vegetti	(substituted off) 54'
CF	19	(Chile) Mauricio Gómez
Substitutes:
GK	33	(Chile) Emmanuel Vargas
DF	15	(Chile) Adrián Rojas
DF	13	(Chile) Esteban Sáez	(substituted on) 84'
MF	18	(Chile) Sebastián Domínguez	(substituted on) 71'
MF	14	(Chile) Lautaro Baeza
MF	29	(Chile) Diego Fuentes
FW	7	(Argentina) Esteban Ciaccheri	(substituted on) 54'
Manager:
(Argentina) Fernando Gamboa

GK	12	(Chile) Paulo Garcés	(yellow card) 81'
RB	8	(Chile) Yerson Opazo	(substituted off) 86'
CB	22	(Argentina) Mariano Uglessich	(yellow card) 14'
CB	5	(Argentina) Julio Barroso
LB	24	(Argentina) Alejandro López
RCM	2	(Chile) Braulio Leal (c)	(substituted off) 70'
LCM	5	(Chile) César Fuentes
AM	10	(Chile) Pablo Hernández
RW	7	(Chile) Luis Pedro Figueroa
LW	13	(Chile) Gonzalo Barriga	(substituted off) 70'
CF	9	(Argentina) Pablo Calandria
Substitutes:
GK	1	(Chile) Roberto González
DF	4	(Chile) Benjamín Vidal
MF	18	(Argentina) Fernando Gutiérrez
MF	14	(Chile) Claudio Meneses
MF	11	(Chile) Francisco Pizarro	(substituted on) 70'
FW	19	(Chile) Carlos Escobar	(substituted on) 86'
FW	16	(Chile) Osmán Huerta	(substituted on) 70'
Manager:
(Argentina) Eduardo Berizzo

Man of the Match:
Pablo Calandria (O'Higgins)
Assistant referees:
Marcelo Barraza
Christian Schiemann
Fourth official:
Roberto Tobar

Match rules

- 90 minutes.
- Seven named substitutes.
- Maximum of three substitutions.

=== Statistics ===
Overall
	RAN	OHI
Goals scored	3	4
Total shots	4	10
Shots on target	1	2
Corner kicks	3	7
Fouls committed	17	6
Offsides	0	1
Yellow cards	7	2
Red cards	2	0
