= 2013–14 Campeonato Nacional Primera División =

Campeonato Nacional
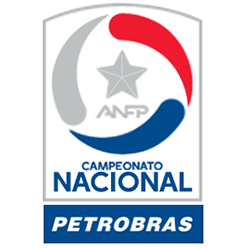
- Season: 2013–14
- Champions: 2013 Apertura: O'Higgins (1st title); 2014 Clausura: Colo-Colo (30th title)
- 2014 Copa Libertadores: O'Higgins; Universidad de Chile
- 2014 Copa Sudamericana: Iquique; Cobresal; Universidad Católica; Huachipato (as cup runner-up)
- 2015 Copa Libertadores: Colo-Colo

The 2013–14 Campeonato Nacional season was the 83rd season of top-flight football in Chile. Unión Española was the defending champion.

== Format changes ==
For the 2013–14 season, the ANFP's Council of Club Presidents approved the return to the Apertura and Clausura format, without playoffs.

== Teams ==
Eighteen teams will be competing in the Primera División for the 2013–14 season, sixteen of whom are returning from the 2013 season. San Marcos de Arica was relegated last season after finishing 18th. There were replaced by Universidad de Concepción, the 2013 Primera B winner.

Team	City	Stadium
Antofagasta	Antofagasta	Regional de Antofagasta
Audax Italiano	Santiago	Municipal de La Florida
Cobreloa	Calama	Municipal de Calama
Cobresal	El Salvador	El Cobre
Colo-Colo	Santiago	Monumental David Arellano
Everton	Viña del Mar	Sausalito
Huachipato	Talcahuano	CAP
Iquique	Iquique	Tierra de Campeones
Ñublense	Chillán	Municipal Nelson Oyarzún Arenas
O'Higgins	Rancagua	El Teniente
Palestino	Santiago	Municipal de La Cisterna
Rangers	Talca	Fiscal de Talca
Santiago Wanderers	Valparaíso	Regional Chiledeportes
Unión Española	Santiago	Santa Laura
Unión La Calera	La Calera	Municipal Nicolás Chahuán
Universidad Católica	Santiago	San Carlos de Apoquindo
Universidad de Chile	Santiago	Estadio Nacional Julio Martínez Prádanos
Universidad de Concepción	Concepción	Estadio Municipal de Concepción

== Torneo Apertura ==
The Torneo Apertura began on July 26 and ended on December 8.

=== Standings ===
Pos	Team	Pld	W	D	L	GF	GA	GD	Pts	Qualification
1	Universidad Católica	17	12	3	2	37	13	+24	39 (Note: A championship tiebreaking play-off was played, due to both teams finished tied on points.)	Apertura Liguilla
2	O'Higgins	17	12	3	2	28	13	+15	39	2014 Copa Libertadores group stage
3	Unión Española	17	9	1	7	21	15	+6	28	Already qualified for Copa Libertadores (Transición champion)
4	Universidad de Chile	17	7	6	4	31	16	+15	27	Apertura Liguilla
5	Palestino	17	8	3	6	26	26	0	27	Apertura Liguilla
6	Iquique	17	7	5	5	22	21	+1	26	Apertura Liguilla
7	Ñublense	17	7	3	7	28	28	0	24	
8	Colo-Colo	17	7	3	7	22	23	−1	24	
9	Cobresal	17	7	3	7	18	25	−7	24	
10	Cobreloa	17	6	5	6	19	18	+1	23	
11	Antofagasta	17	6	5	6	18	22	−4	23	
12	Universidad de Concepción	17	5	7	5	21	19	+2	22	
13	Santiago Wanderers	17	5	6	6	20	25	−5	21	
14	Audax Italiano	17	4	5	8	23	25	−2	17	
15	Everton	17	5	1	11	16	29	−13	16	
16	Unión La Calera	17	3	6	8	15	24	−9	15	
17	Rangers	17	4	3	10	20	32	−12	15	
18	Huachipato	17	3	4	10	6	20	−14	13	

=== Results ===
Home \ Away	ANT	AUD	COB	CSL	CC	EVE	IQUI	HUA	ÑUB	OHI	PAL	RAN	SW	UE	ULC	UC	UCH	UDC
Antofagasta			0–0		1–1	2–0	1–2	1–0				0–2		1–0		2–0		1–1
Audax Italiano	3–4		1–1		4–0	4–1			0–2	1–1		2–0		0–2				
Cobreloa				2–0		1–2	2–3					2–1	2–1		1–0		2–2	2–0
Cobresal	2–0	3–1			3–1		0–0	1–0		0–4		2–1	1–1					1–0
Colo-Colo			2–1			0–1	4–1		2–0		0–1			0–2	2–0		3–2	
Everton				0–1			1–0	2–3			0–2	3–1		1–2		0–2	2–1	2–3
Iquique		2–1						1–1	4–1	0–1	0–1			2–1	2–1	2–2	0–3	
Huachipato		2–1	0–0		0–0						0–2		0–1		0–1	0–4		0–0
Ñublense	2–1		1–1	2–1		1–0		3–1					2–3	0–2			2–2	
O'Higgins	2–1		1–0		2–3	1–1		1–0	1–0		0–1			1–0				
Palestino	0–1	1–2	2–0	2–1					3–6				2–2		1–1	3–6	1–1	
Rangers				1–2	0–3		0–0	1–0	0–3	3–4	2–3			1–1	2–2			
Santiago Wanderers	1–1	0–0			0–0	3–0	0–2			0–3		0–3						2–1
Unión Española			0–1	4–1				0–2			2–1		3–1		1–0	0–1	0–2	
Unión La Calera	1–1	1–1		1–1		2–0			2–1	1–2			1–3			0–2	0–3	
Universidad Católica		1–1	2–1	3–0	1–0				3–0	1–2		5–1	2–0					1–1
Universidad de Chile	5–0	2–0		3–0				1–0		1–1		0–1	2–2			0–1		1–1
Universidad de Concepción		2–1			4–1		1–1		2–2	0–1	2–0	2–1		0–1	1–1			

Updated to match(es) played on 8 December 2013. Source: Soccerway.com
Legend: Blue = home team win; Yellow = draw; Red = away team win.

=== Súper Final ===
December 10, 2013
19:30

Universidad Católica	0–1	O'Higgins
	Report	Hernández 35'

Estadio Nacional, Santiago
Attendance: 40,000
Referee: Jorge Osorio

Champions

1st title

=== Apertura Liguilla ===
- Winner qualify for 2014 Copa Libertadores first stage (Chile 3).
- Runner-up qualify for 2014 Copa Sudamericana first stage (Chile 4).

Semifinals
2	Universidad de Chile	1	3	4
3	Palestino	1	1	2
1	Universidad Católica	2	1	3 (2)
4	Iquique	2	1	3 (3)

Finals
2	Universidad de Chile	1	4	5
4	Iquique	0	0	0

==== Semifinals ====
13 December 2013 1st Leg	Palestino	1–1	Universidad de Chile	Independencia, Santiago
19:30	López 66'	Report	I. Díaz 64'	Stadium: Estadio Santa Laura; Attendance: 4,828; Referee: Julio Bascuñán

16 December 2013 2nd Leg	Universidad de Chile	3–1 (4–2 agg.)	Palestino	Independencia, Santiago
19:00	Rojas 7', 74'; Lorenzetti 38'	Report	Gutiérrez 55'	Stadium: Estadio Santa Laura; Attendance: 9,901; Referee: Jorge Osorio

13 December 2013 1st Leg	Deportes Iquique	2–2	Universidad Católica	Iquique
22:00	R. Díaz 45+1'; Caroca 47'	Report	R. Costa 11'; Muñoz 29'	Stadium: Estadio Tierra de Campeones; Attendance: 3,756; Referee: Claudio Puga

16 December 2013 2nd Leg	Universidad Católica	1–1 (3–3 agg.) (2–3 p)	Deportes Iquique	Las Condes, Santiago
21:30	Jadue 13'	Report	Villalobos 77'	Stadium: Estadio San Carlos de Apoquindo; Attendance: 7,600; Referee: Patricio Polic
	Penalties
	Ramos (penalty missed); Ríos (penalty missed); T. Costa (penalty scored); R. Costa (penalty scored); Andía (penalty missed)		(penalty scored) Zenteno; (penalty scored) Romero; (penalty missed) Delgado; (penalty missed) R. Díaz; (penalty scored) Villalobos

==== Finals ====
19 December 2013 1st Leg	Deportes Iquique	0–1	Universidad de Chile	Iquique
22:00	Brito (red card) 80'	Report	I. Díaz 35'	Stadium: Estadio Tierra de Campeones; Attendance: 6,411; Referee: Enrique Osses

22 December 2013 2nd Leg	Universidad de Chile	4–0 (5–0 agg.)	Deportes Iquique	Ñuñoa, Santiago
18:00	Fernández 5'; Aránguiz 11'; I. Díaz 76', 86'	Report	Ortiz (red card) 85'	Stadium: Estadio Nacional; Attendance: 22,476; Referee: Eduardo Gamboa

Universidad de Chile qualified to the 2014 Copa Libertadores. Deportes Iquique, as the runner-ups, qualified to the 2014 Copa Sudamericana.

== Torneo Clausura ==
The Torneo Clausura began on January 3 and ended on April 27.

=== Standings ===
Pos	Team	Pld	W	D	L	GF	GA	GD	Pts	Qualification
1	Colo-Colo	17	13	3	1	45	20	+25	42	2015 Copa Libertadores group stage
2	Universidad Católica	17	10	3	4	32	19	+13	33	Already qualified for Copa Sudamericana (aggregate best team)
3	O'Higgins	17	8	6	3	20	12	+8	30	Already qualified for Copa Libertadores (Apertura champion)
4	Universidad de Concepción	17	7	6	4	20	17	+3	27	Clausura Liguilla
5	Palestino	17	7	5	5	25	20	+5	26	Clausura Liguilla
6	Huachipato	17	7	4	6	31	28	+3	25	Already qualified for Copa Sudamericana (Copa Chile runner-up)
7	Iquique	17	8	1	8	23	24	−1	25	Already qualified for Copa Sudamericana (Apertura Liguilla winner)
8	Cobreloa	17	6	4	7	21	22	−1	22	Clausura Liguilla
9	Unión Española	17	6	4	7	25	34	−9	22	
10	Cobresal	17	6	3	8	23	25	−2	21	Clausura Liguilla
11	Antofagasta	17	5	6	6	19	23	−4	21	
12	Universidad de Chile	17	6	2	9	27	27	0	20	
13	Unión La Calera	17	6	2	9	21	28	−7	20	
14	Audax Italiano	17	4	7	6	22	22	0	19	
15	Santiago Wanderers	17	5	4	8	22	24	−2	19	
16	Everton	17	5	4	8	16	27	−11	19	
17	Ñublense	17	5	2	10	21	30	−9	17	
18	Rangers	17	4	4	9	15	26	−11	16	

=== Results ===
Home \ Away	ANT	AUD	COB	CSL	CC	EVE	IQUI	HUA	ÑUB	OHI	PAL	RAN	SAW	UE	ULC	UCA	UCH	UDC
Antofagasta		0–1		1–0					1–0	0–0	2–1		1–1		2–3		1–3	
Audax Italiano				1–3			3–0	0–0			1–1		2–0		0–1	1–1	3–3	2–2
Cobreloa	0–1	2–0			0–0			1–1	3–1	2–1	0–1			1–1		2–1		
Cobresal			3–0			2–0			2–1		1–1	2–2		2–0	1–5	0–1	2–1	
Colo-Colo	1–1	2–1		3–2				5–3		3–0		3–1	1–0			2–2		1–2
Everton	1–1	1–1	2–0		0–2				1–1	0–2			2–1		1–0			
Iquique	3–2		5–2	2–0	2–5	2–0						0–1	3–1					0–1
Huachipato	4–1			1–0		0–0	0–1		1–0	1–0		3–2		1–2			5–2	
Ñublense		2–1			3–5		3–0			0–2	0–2	1–0			2–0	1–2		3–1
O'Higgins		1–1		3–2			1–0					1–1	2–0		0–0	2–0	1–0	0–0
Palestino					1–2	4–0	0–1	2–1		1–1		0–0		1–2				1–0
Rangers	1–3	0–2	2–1			3–0							1–0			0–2	0–1	0–0
Santiago Wanderers			2–2	2–0				4–2	1–1		2–2			4–0	1–0	0–2	2–1	
Unión Española	1–1	3–2			1–4	1–3	1–1		3–2	1–3		4–0						2–1
Unión La Calera			0–1		1–5		0–2	0–6			2–3	3–1		4–0				0–2
Universidad Católica	2–0					3–1	1–0	7–1						1–0	1–1		0–3	
Universidad de Chile			0–4		0–1	2–1	3–1		5–0		0–1			3–3	0–1			
Universidad de Concepción	1–1		1–0	1–1		2–3		1–1					2–1			2–1	1–0	

Updated to match(es) played on 5 March 2014. Source: Soccerway.com
Legend: Blue = home team win; Yellow = draw; Red = away team win.

=== Clausura Liguilla ===
- Winner qualify for 2014 Copa Sudamericana first stage (Chile 2).

Semifinals
1	Universidad de Concepción	0	2	2
4	Cobresal	0	3	3
2	Palestino	1	4	5
3	Cobreloa	0	0	0

Finals
4	Cobresal	2	1	3
2	Palestino	0	2	2

==== Semi-finals ====
30 April 2014 1st Leg	Cobresal	0–0	Universidad de Concepción	Estadio El Cobre, El Salvador
16:00		Report		Attendance: 305; Referee: Carlos Rumiano

4 May 2014 2nd Leg	Universidad de Concepción	2–3	Cobresal	Estadio Municipal, Yumbel
15:30	Cabral 19'; Muñoz 75'	Report	Salinas 21' (pen.); Navarro 62'; Cantero 90+3'	Attendance: 1,700; Referee: Enrique Osses

Cobresal won 3–2 on aggregate.

30 April 2014 1st Leg	Cobreloa	0–1	Palestino	Estadio Regional Calvo y Bascuñán, Antofagasta
19:30		Report	Ramos 49'	Attendance: 1,417; Referee: Christian Rojas

4 May 2014 2nd Leg	Palestino	4–0	Cobreloa	Estadio Municipal de La Cisterna, Santiago
12:00	Duma 37', 74'; Ramos 64'; López 68'	Report		Attendance: 2,028; Referee: Patricio Polic

Palestino won 5–0 on aggregate.

==== Finals ====
7 May 2014 1st Leg	Cobresal	2–0	Palestino	Estadio El Cobre, El Salvador
16:00	Cantero 14'; Maldonado 87'	Report	Rosende (red card) 80'	Attendance: 964; Referee: Julio Bascuñán

11 May 2014 2nd Leg	Palestino	2–1	Cobresal	Estadio Municipal de La Cisterna, Santiago
12:00	Carvajal 45+4'; López (red card) 36'; Riquelme 59'; Ramos (red card) 55'	Report	Salinas 67'	Referee: Eduardo Gamboa

Cobresal won 3–2 on aggregate and qualified to the 2014 Copa Sudamericana.

== Aggregate table ==
Pos	Team	Pld	W	D	L	GF	GA	GD	Pts	Qualification or relegation
1	Universidad Católica	34	22	6	6	69	32	+37	72	2014 Copa Sudamericana first stage
2	O'Higgins	34	20	9	5	48	25	+23	69	
3	Colo-Colo	34	20	6	8	67	43	+24	66	
4	Palestino	34	15	8	11	51	46	+5	53	
5	Iquique	34	15	6	13	45	45	0	51	
6	Unión Española	34	15	5	14	46	49	−3	50	
7	Universidad de Chile	34	13	8	13	58	43	+15	47	
8	Universidad de Concepción	34	12	13	9	41	36	+5	49	
9	Cobreloa	34	12	9	13	40	40	0	45	
10	Cobresal	34	13	6	15	41	50	−9	45	
11	Antofagasta	34	11	11	12	37	45	−8	44	
12	Ñublense	34	12	5	17	49	58	−9	41	
13	Santiago Wanderers	34	10	10	14	42	49	−7	40	
14	Huachipato	34	10	8	16	37	48	−11	38	
15	Audax Italiano	34	8	12	14	45	47	−2	36	
16	Unión La Calera	34	9	8	17	36	52	−16	35	
17	Everton	34	10	5	19	32	56	−24	35	Relegated to the Primera División B
18	Rangers	34	8	7	19	35	58	−23	31	Relegated to the Primera División B
