= Emiliano Vecchio =

Argentine footballer

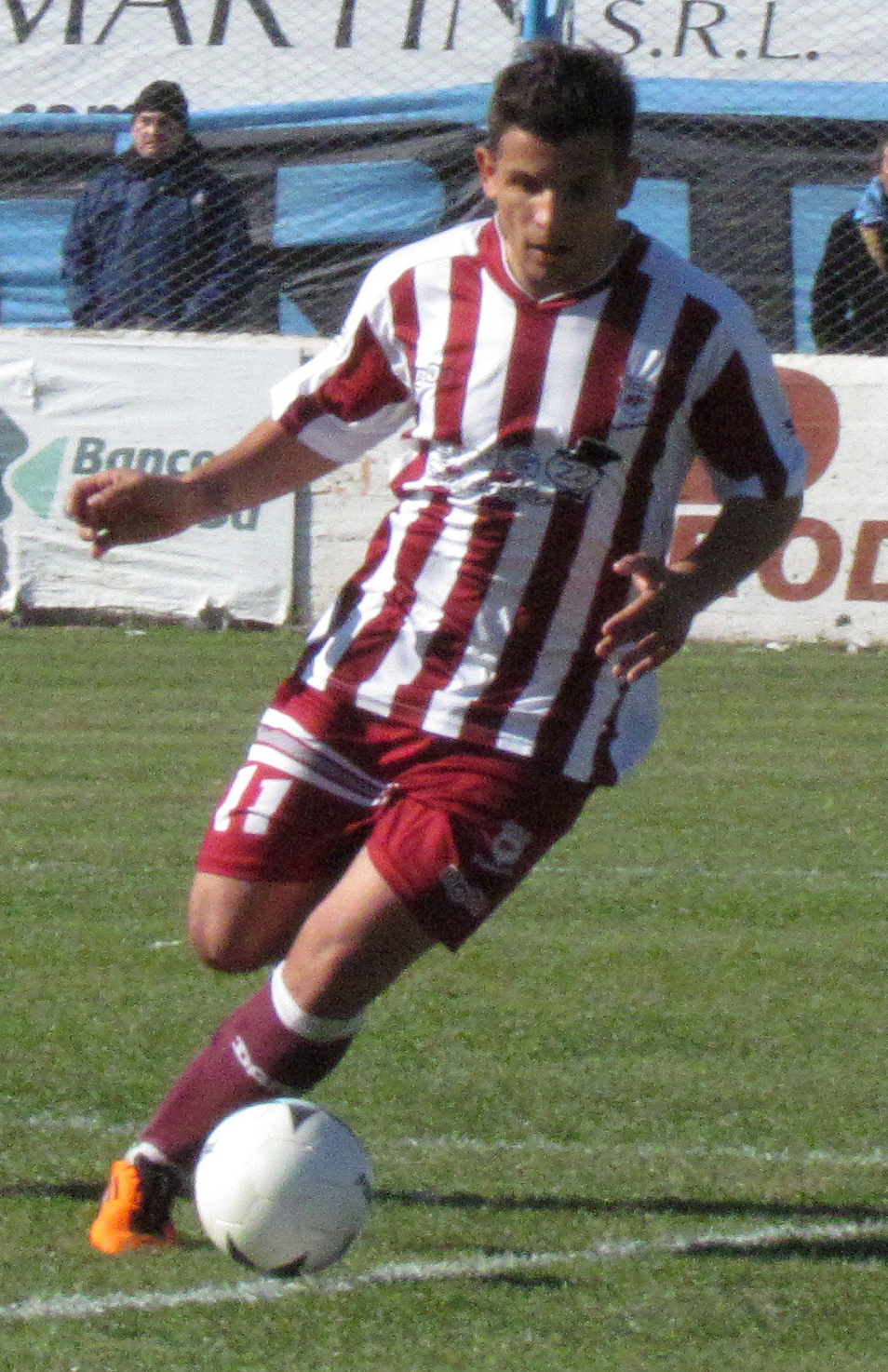
- Vecchio with Defensores de Belgrano (VR) in 2011

Personal information
- Full name: Emiliano Gabriel Vecchio
- Date of birth: 16 November 1988 (age 37)
- Place of birth: Rosario, Argentina
- Height: 1.77 m (5 ft 10 in)
- Position: Midfielder

Youth career
- 1997–2005: Rosario Central

Senior career*
Years	Team	Apps	(Gls)
2005–2007	Rosario Central	18	(1)
2008	Fuenlabrada	19	(2)
2008–2009	Rayo Majadahonda	0	(0)
2009	Corinthians	0	(0)
2009	→ Grêmio Barueri (loan)	3	(0)
2010–2011	Defensores de Belgrano VR	44	(20)
2012	Unión Española	35	(6)
2012	Unión Española B	4	(0)
2013–2015	Colo-Colo	90	(19)
2016	Qatar SC	11	(4)
2016–2019	Santos	20	(1)
2018–2019	→ Shabab Al-Ahli (loan)	26	(6)
2019	Al-Ittihad	9	(3)
2020	Bolívar	5	(0)
2020–2022	Rosario Central	47	(11)
2022–2023	Racing Club	20	(5)
2024	Unión Española	22	(6)
2025	Defensores de Belgrano	19	(1)
2025	Regatas San Nicolás	3	(0)
2026	Unión Española	0	(0)
- * Club domestic league appearances and goals as of 27 January 2026

Emiliano Gabriel Vecchio (born 16 November 1988) is an Argentine professional footballer who plays as a midfielder.

== Club career ==
=== Rosario Central ===
Born in Rosario, Vecchio began his career at hometown professional club Rosario Central, joining its youth ranks in 1997 at the age of nine. He progressed through the club's youth setup, also being a teammate of Ángel Di María.

On 6 November 2005 Vecchio made his first team debut, coming on as a 77th-minute substitute for Diego Calgaro in a 1–2 away loss against Newell's Old Boys; aged only 16, he became the fourth youngest to debut for the club. He scored his first professional goal on 1 March of the following year, netting the equalizer in a 1–1 home draw against Argentinos Juniors.

=== Spain ===
In January 2008, after a failed trial at Real Madrid, Vecchio joined Segunda División B side CF Fuenlabrada. After suffering relegation with the club, he moved to neighbouring CF Rayo Majadahonda, in Tercera División; he left the latter in 2009.

=== Grêmio Barueri / Defensores de Belgrano ===
In February 2009, Vecchio signed a one-year deal with Corinthians in March, being immediately loaned to Grêmio Barueri. After being rarely used, his loan was cut short early, and he spent the following six months practicing MMA fight.

In 2010, after returning to his hometown, Vecchio joined Defensores de Belgrano de Villa Ramallo. With the side he scored in an impressive rate, netting a career-best 11 goals in 2011–12.

=== Chile ===
In 2012, Vecchio signed for Chile's Campeonato Nacional side Unión Española to face the Torneo Apertura and the Copa Libertadores. At the team led by José Luis Sierra in the age, he highlighted in both competitions. His first continental goal was against Colombian side Junior, scoring his side's goal following a nice free kick in a 2–1 away loss. During the season, he scored six goals in 35 appearances and helped Unión to be runner-up of the 2012 Clausura.

On 26 December 2012, it was confirmed that Vecchio alongside his teammate at Unión, Emilio Hernández, were the new signings of Colo-Colo for the 2013 season. After an irregular season for the club, the following year Vecchio was protagonist of the league title obtained, being an undisputed player at Héctor Tapia's formation. On 26 December 2015, he announced his departure after having altercations with the club's president, Anibal Mosa.

=== Qatar SC / Santos ===
On 20 January 2016, Vecchio joined Qatar SC, signing a six-month contract. On 10 May, he agreed to a pre-contract with Campeonato Brasileiro Série A club Santos FC, signing a three-and-a-half-year deal on 13 June.

Vecchio made his debut for Peixe on 16 July 2016, coming on as a late substitute for Gabriel in a 3–1 home win against Ponte Preta. After being completely ostracized by Dorival Júnior, he started to feature more regularly under Levir Culpi, and scored his first goal for the club on 19 July 2017 in a 1–0 home win against Chapecoense.

On 14 August 2018, Vecchio was loaned to Shabab Al-Ahli Dubai FC for one year.

=== Al-Ittihad ===
On 11 July 2019, Santos announced the transfer of Vecchio to Al-Ittihad Club.

=== Return to Chile ===
In 2024, Vecchio rejoined Unión Española from Racing Club.

After playing for Defensores de Belgrano and Regatas de San Nicolás during 2025, Vecchio returned to Unión Española by third time for the 2026 season in the Liga de Ascenso, but he was fired by serious breach of contract on 27 January 2026.

== Career statistics ==
As of 30 September 2022

Club	Season	League			Cup		Continental		Other		Total	
Club	Season	Division	Apps	Goals	Apps	Goals	Apps	Goals	Apps	Goals	Apps	Goals
Rosario Central	2005–06	Primera División	18	1	0	0	3 (Note: Appearance(s) in Copa Sudamericana)	0	—		21	1
Rosario Central	2006–07	Primera División	0	0	0	0	—		—		0	0
Rosario Central	Subtotal		18	1	0	0	3	0	—		21	1
Fuenlabrada	2007–08	Segunda División B	19	2	—		—		—		19	2
Grêmio Barueri	2009	Série A	3	0	0	0	—		1 (Note: Appearance(s) in Campeonato Paulista)	0	4	0
Defensores de Belgrano (VR)	2010–11	Torneo Argentino B	29	9	—		—		—		29	9
Defensores de Belgrano (VR)	2011–12	Torneo Argentino A	15	11	2	2	—		—		15	11
Defensores de Belgrano (VR)	Subtotal		44	20	2	2	—		—		46	22
Unión Española	2012	Campeonato Nacional	33	5	6	5	6 (Note: Appearance(s) in Copa Libertadores)	1	—		45	11
Colo-Colo	2013	Campeonato Nacional	16	2	—		—		—		16	2
Colo-Colo	2013–14	Campeonato Nacional	32	8	6	2	4	0	—		42	10
Colo-Colo	2014–15	Campeonato Nacional	28	6	4	1	6	0	—		38	7
Colo-Colo	2015–16	Campeonato Nacional	14	3	12	2	—		—		26	5
Colo-Colo	Subtotal		90	19	22	5	10	0	0	0	122	24
Qatar SC	2015–16	Qatar Stars League	11	4	—		—		—		11	4
Santos	2016	Série A	6	0	3	0	—		—		9	0
Santos	2017	Série A	12	1	1	0	2	0	—		15	1
Santos	2018	Série A	2	0	1	0	3	0	11	0	17	0
Santos	Subtotal		20	1	5	0	5	0	11	0	41	1
Shabab Al-Ahli	2018–19	UAE Pro-League	23	4	6	2	—		—		29	6
Al-Ittihad	2019–20	Saudi Professional League	9	3	0	0	4	1	—		13	4
Bolívar	2020	Primera División	5	0	—		2	0	—		7	0
Rosario Central	2020	Primera División	—		13 (Note: Appearance(s) in Copa de la Liga Profesional and Copa Argentina)	5	—		—		13	5
Rosario Central	2021	Primera División	—		26 (Note: Appearance(s) in Copa de la Liga Profesional)	6	—		—		26	6
Rosario Central	2022	Primera División	—		9	0	—		—		9	0
Rosario Central	Subtotal		—		48	11	—		—		48	11
Racing Club	2022	Primera División	10	1	—		—		—		10	1
Total			271	57	99	25	24	1	12	0	396	83

== Honours ==
=== Club ===
Colo-Colo

- Primera División de Chile (2): 2014 Clausura, 2015 Apertura

Shabab Al-Ahli

- UAE League Cup (2019)
- UAE President Cup (2019)

=== Individual ===
- El Gráfico Magazine Awards: 2012 Team of the Season
- SIFUP Awards: 2013–14 Best Left Midfielder
