= Walter Mazzolatti =

Argentine footballer

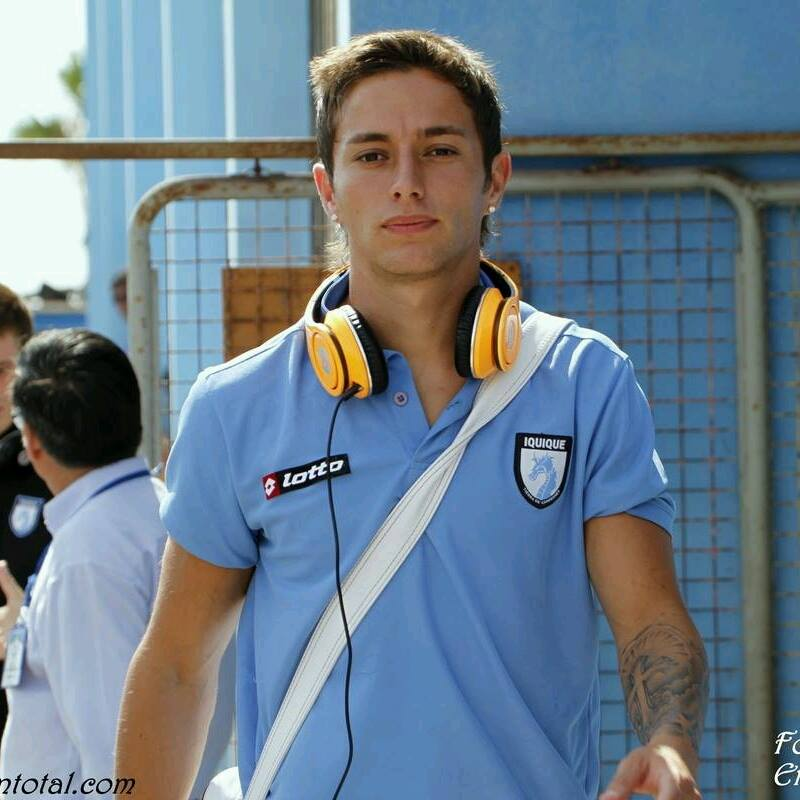

Personal information
- Full name: Walter Daniel Mazzolatti Rivarola
- Date of birth: 25 April 1990 (age 36)
- Place of birth: San Juan, Argentina
- Height: 1.77 m (5 ft 10 in)
- Position: Forward

Youth career
- Gimnasia LP

Senior career*
Years	Team	Apps	(Gls)
2011–2013	Gimnasia LP	1	(0)
2013–2016	Deportes Iquique	43	(2)
2016–2017	Estudiantes Paraná	17	(0)
2017	San Luis	4	(0)
2019	Central	0	(0)
2019	El Farolito	5	(0)
2019–2020	Los Andes	19	(1)
- * Club domestic league appearances and goals as of 16:45, 7 August 2022 (UTC)

Walter Daniel Mazzolatti Rivarola (born 25 April 1990) is an Argentinean footballer. Besides Argentina, he has played in Brazil and Chile.

== Honours ==
=== Club ===
Deportes Iquique

- Copa Chile: 2013–14
