= Rafael Caroca =

Chilean footballer (born 1989)

Personal information
- Full name: Rafael Antonio Caroca Cordero
- Date of birth: 19 July 1989 (age 37)
- Place of birth: Curicó, Chile
- Height: 1.74 m (5 ft 9 in)
- Position: Midfielder

Team information
- Current team: Huachipato

Youth career
- 2004–2007: Colo-Colo

Senior career*
| Years | Team | Apps | (Gls) |
| 2008–2014 | Colo-Colo | 53 | (0) |
| 2008 | → O'Higgins (loan) | 6 | (0) |
| 2011 | → Deportes La Serena (loan) | 31 | (2) |
| 2013 | Colo-Colo B | 16 | (1) |
| 2013–2014 | → Deportes Iquique (loan) | 37 | (1) |
| 2014–2017 | Deportes Iquique | 93 | (6) |
| 2017–2019 | Universidad de Chile | 43 | (0) |
| 2020 | Deportes Iquique | 18 | (0) |
| 2021–2024 | Ñublense | 99 | (2) |
| 2025– | Huachipato | 0 | (0) |

International career^{‡}
| 2008–2010 | Chile U23 | 11 | (0) |
| 2009 | Chile U20 | 4 | (0) |
| 2008–2017 | Chile | 3 | (0) |
- * Club domestic league appearances and goals as of 3 December 2024 ‡ National team caps and goals as of 15 January 2017

Rafael Antonio Caroca Cordero (Spanish pronunciation: [rafaˈel kaˈɾoka]; born 19 July 1989) is a Chilean professional footballer who plays as a midfielder for Chilean Primera División club Huachipato.

== Club career ==
Born in Curicó, Maule Region, Caroca arrived in Colo-Colo's youth academy aged 14, after being discovered in 2004 by Marcelo Espina, club's legend. Three years later, already on mid-2007, he was promoted to the first-adult team and appeared in the bench some Torneo Clausura games.

For the 2008 he was loaned to O'Higgins to gain experience. However, he returned to Macul–based team the following year and was part of the champion team that reached the Torneo Clausura. In January 2010, Caroca was loaned to Deportes La Serena and stayed there until December 2011 where was an immovable player during his spell.

Since 2013 he plays for Deportes Iquique, being on loan during 2013-14 season (where he won the Copa Chile) and then definitely joining the incoming season.

Caroca joined Huachipato from Ñublense for the 2025 season.

== International career ==
In January 2008, Marcelo Bielsa called up Caroca to the Chile national team for friendlies that were played on the home turf of Japan and South Korea. He was also called up for the March 2008 friendly against Israel in Jerusalem; Caroca was the only player from the domestic league to be named in the squad.

In May 2008, Caroca was once again selected by Bielsa. This time it was to the u-23 2008 Toulon Tournament. Caroca started the last three games Chile played in the tournament. Caroca was one of the youngest players to see significant playing time during the tournament. Caroca was named the best young player of the tournament. In addition, he took part in both the 2009 and the 2010 editions.

Nine years later, he was called up by Argentine coach Juan Antonio Pizzi to Chilean senior team for play the 2017 China Cup. He played one game against Croatia in the friendly tournament that Chile won.

== Personal life ==
It was said his mother is Venezuelan, but he denied it, rejecting a possible call-up to the Venezuela senior team. He has two younger brothers who are professional footballers: Ignacio – who has been international with Chile at U20 level – and Matías.

== Honours ==
Colo-Colo

- Chilean Primera División: 2007 Clausura, 2009 Clausura

Deportes Iquique

- Copa Chile: 2013–14

Huachipato

- Copa Chile: 2025

Chile U23

- Toulon Tournament: 2009

Chile

- China Cup: 2017

Individual

- Toulon Tournament Best Youth Player: 2008
