= Nicolás Corvetto =

Chilean footballer (born 1986)

Nicolás Crovetto
Personal information
- Full name: Nicolás Ignacio Crovetto Aqueveque
- Date of birth: 15 March 1986 (age 40)
- Place of birth: Coquimbo, Chile
- Height: 1.75 m (5 ft 9 in)
- Positions: Left midfielder; left-back

Youth career
- Academia Los Piratas
- Coquimbo Unido

Senior career*
Years	Team	Apps	(Gls)
2004–2007	Coquimbo Unido	90	(5)
2007–2008	Audax Italiano	31	(0)
2008–2010	Udinese	12	(0)
2009	→ Albacete (loan)	3	(0)
2009	→ Triestina (loan)	4	(0)
2010	→ Taranto (loan)	11	(1)
2011	AEL Limassol	9	(0)
2011	Coquimbo Unido	17	(0)
2012–2015	Huachipato	86	(2)
2013	→ Colo-Colo (loan)	8	(0)
2015–2016	Südtirol	29	(1)
2016–2017	Coquimbo Unido	17	(1)
2017–2021	Audax Italiano	76	(0)
2022–2023	Magallanes	28	(0)
Total		421	(10)

International career
2008	Chile U23	4	(0)
- * Club domestic league appearances and goals

Nicolás Ignacio Crovetto Aqueveque (born Nicolás Ignacio Corvetto Aqueveque; 15 March 1986) is a Chilean former footballer who played as a left midfielder.

== Club career ==
Crovetto started with his hometown team Coquimbo Unido before signing with Audax Italiano in 2007. After one year in Audax, Crovetto moved to Udinese Calcio. He spent his first six months in Italy without being able to play, however, as he had problems getting a work permit. In January 2009 Crovetto was loaned to Albacete Balompié until end of the season. In April 2009 Audax Italiano claimed that the Italian club owe the transfer fee of the player.

In summer 2009 his EU passport was solved, and he left for Serie B side Triestina. In January 2010 he left for Taranto.

At 28 January 2011, he signed his contract with AEL Limassol until the end of the season. His contract is for five months and AEL Limassol is going to re-new his contract on the end of the season if he shows that he is worthy.

In July 2011 he returned to Coquimbo Unido. In 2012, he signed for Huachipato.

His last club was Magallanes in 2023.

== International career ==
Crovetto was part of the Chile under-23 squad that played the 2008 Toulon Tournament.

At senior level, he was a substitute of the Chile squad in the friendly match against Spain on 19 November 2008, but he didn't enter.

== Personal life ==
His father, Eduardo Corvetto, is a former president of Coquimbo Unido. His birth surname is Corvetto, but he changed it to Crovetto, originally as his Italian great-grandfather, to acquire the Italian citizenship. The surname had been misspelled by the Civil Registry Service of Chile.

Following his retirement, Crovetto became a padel instructor and switched to real estate business.

== Honours ==
Huachipato

- Primera División de Chile: 2012 Clausura
