= Fabián Benítez =

Footballer (born 1981)

Personal information
- Full name: Fabián Raúl Benítez Gómez
- Date of birth: 2 June 1981 (age 45)
- Place of birth: Encarnación, Paraguay
- Height: 1.80 m (5 ft 11 in)
- Position: Defensive midfielder

Team information
- Current team: Colo-Colo
- Number: 8

Senior career*
Years	Team	Apps	(Gls)
2001–2004	Olimpia	32	(0)
2005–2007	Universidad de Concepción	80	(1)
2008	Cobreloa	45	(2)
2009–2013	Audax Italiano	108	(4)
2013–	Colo-Colo	3	(0)
2014–	Universidad de Concepción		
- * Club domestic league appearances and goals as of 24 June 2013

Fabián Raúl Benítez Gómez (Spanish pronunciation: [faˈβjam beˈnites], born 2 July 1981) is a Paraguayan naturalized Chilean footballer who plays as defensive midfielder for Primera División club C.D. Universidad de Concepción.
