= Juan Carlos Lescano =

Argentine footballer

Personal information
- Full name: Juan Carlos Lescano
- Date of birth: December 18, 1990 (age 35)
- Place of birth: Rosario, Santa Fe, Argentina
- Height: 1.70 m (5 ft 7 in)
- Position: Second striker

Youth career
- Rosario Central
- Central Córdoba Rosario

Senior career*
Years	Team	Apps	(Gls)
2011–2012	Central Córdoba Rosario	62	(13)
2012–2013	River Plate	0	(0)
2013	→ Central Córdoba Rosario (loan)	18	(1)
2013–2014	→ Everton (loan)	8	(1)
2014	Deportivo Merlo	18	(1)
2015	Sportivo Belgrano	5	(0)
2015	Macará	3	(0)
2015	León de Huánuco	15	(1)
2016	Deportivo Municipal	21	(1)
2016–2017	Central Córdoba Rosario	29	(4)
2018	Arsenal de Sarandí	0	(0)
2019	Midland	24	(3)
2019	Deportivo Merlo	12	(0)
2020–2021	Central Córdoba Rosario	16	(0)
Total		231	(25)
- * Club domestic league appearances and goals

Juan Carlos Lescano (born 18 December 1990) is a former Argentine football forward.

== Career ==
Born in Rosario, Santa Fe, Lescano started his career in the youth systems of Rosario Central and Central Córdoba de Rosario, going on to appear more than 62 times for the second one.

In July 2012, River Plate bought Lescano from Central Córdoba for $400,000.

In 2013 Juan Carlos will be playing for Everton FC in Vina del Mar Chile.

He ended his career with Central Córodba in 2020–21.

== Career statistics ==
As of 24 July 2012

Club	Season	League		National Cup		International Cup		Total	
Club	Season	Apps	Goals	Apps	Goals	Apps	Goals	Apps	Goals
Central Córdoba	2010–11	14	2	-	-	-	-	14	2
Central Córdoba	2011–12	44	10	4	1	-	-	48	11
Central Córdoba	Total	58	12	4	1	-	-	62	13
River Plate	2012–13	-	-	-	-	-	-	-	-
River Plate	Total	-	-	-	-	-	-	-	-
Career totals		58	12	4	1	-	-	62	13
