= Felipe Flores (footballer, born 1987) =

Chilean footballer

Personal information
- Full name: Felipe Ignacio Flores Chandía
- Date of birth: 9 January 1987 (age 39)
- Place of birth: Santiago, Chile
- Height: 1.77 m (5 ft 9 1/2 in)
- Position: Striker

Team information
- Current team: Deportes Recoleta

Youth career
- 1997–2006: Colo-Colo

Senior career*
Years	Team	Apps	(Gls)
2004–2008	Colo-Colo	13	(5)
2007	→ O'Higgins (loan)	14	(3)
2007	→ Cobreloa (loan)	16	(6)
2008	→ Unión Española (loan)	8	(1)
2009	Salamanca	19	(10)
2009–2011	La Piedad	28	(13)
2010	→ Deportes Antofagasta (loan)	1	(0)
2010–2011	→ Dorados (loan)	32	(11)
2011	Santiago Morning	11	(5)
2012	Cobreloa	19	(6)
2012–2015	Colo-Colo	92	(26)
2013	Colo-Colo B	2	(2)
2015–2016	Tijuana	6	(1)
2016–2017	Veracruz	7	(0)
2018–2020	Deportes Antofagasta	68	(7)
2021	Barnechea	25	(10)
2022–2023	Magallanes	56	(11)
2024	Deportes Limache	36	(7)
2025–2026	San Luis	12	(3)
2026–	Deportes Recoleta	0	(9)

International career^{‡}
2003	Chile U17	4	(1)
2007	Chile U20	4	(1)
2012	Chile	2	(1)
- * Club domestic league appearances and goals as of 11 June 2026 ‡ National team caps and goals as of 12 April 2012

Felipe Ignacio Flores Chandía (born 9 January 1987) is a Chilean footballer who plays as a striker for Deportes Recoleta.

== Career ==
He has represented the Chile national team at the U-17, U-20, and professionals levels. In 2007, he was loaned to O'Higgins in the first semester and Cobreloa in the second semester. Along with Fernando Meneses, Flores was released by Cobreloa prior to the playoffs in December 2007 due to breaking team rules. Coincidentally both players belong to Colo-Colo. He belongs to Colo-Colo where he did not receive many chances with the first team but in the three appearances he had in 2006 he scored one goal.

In 2024, Flores joined Deportes Limache in the Primera B from Magallanes. The next year, he switched to San Luis de Quillota and left them in June 2026.

On 15 June 2026, Flores joined Deportes Recoleta.

=== International goals ===
Goal	Date	Venue	Opponent	Score	Result	Competition
1	11 April 2012	Estadio Jorge Basadre, Tacna, Perú	Peru	0–2	0–3	Friendly

== Honours ==
Colo-Colo

- Primera División de Chile (3): 2006 Apertura, 2006 Clausura, 2014 Clausura
