= Ignacio Caroca =

Chilean footballer (born 1993)

Personal information
- Full name: Ignacio Andrés Caroca Cordero
- Date of birth: 2 November 1993 (age 33)
- Place of birth: Curicó, Chile
- Height: 1.69 m (5 ft 7 in)
- Position: Midfielder

Team information
- Current team: Colchagua

Youth career
- Colo-Colo

Senior career*
Years	Team	Apps	(Gls)
2011–2015	Colo-Colo	0	(0)
2012	→ Barnechea (loan)	13	(1)
2013	Colo-Colo B	8	(1)
2014	→ Ñublense (loan)	11	(0)
2014–2015	→ Barnechea (loan)	9	(0)
2016–2017	Curicó Unido	28	(0)
2017	Deportes Iquique	3	(0)
2018	Deportes Puerto Montt	3	(0)
2018	Colchagua	8	(0)
2020–2024	Rangers	131	(5)
2025	Deportes Santa Cruz	26	(1)
2026	Rangers Corporación	–	(–)
2026–	Colchagua	0	(0)

International career
2013	Chile U20	7	(0)
- * Club domestic league appearances and goals as of 16 March 2026

Ignacio Andrés Caroca Cordero (born November 2, 1993) is a Chilean footballer who plays as a midfielder for Colchagua.

== Career ==
Caroca spent five seasons with Rangers de Talca from 2020 to 2024. In 2025, he switched to Deportes Santa Cruz.

In March 2026, Caroca joined Rangers Corporación in the Villa Agustín Association from Talca. In July of the same year, he returned to professional football with Colchagua.

== Personal life ==
He has two brothers who are professional footballers: his older brother Rafael – who has been international with Chile at senior level – and his younger brother Matías.
