= Emilio Hernández =

Chilean footballer (born 1984)

Personal information
- Full name: Emilio Exequiel Hernández Hernández
- Date of birth: 14 September 1984 (age 42)
- Place of birth: Santiago, Chile
- Height: 1.74 m (5 ft 9 in)
- Positions: Attacking midfielder; forward

Youth career
- 1996: Colo-Colo
- 1997–2004: Universidad de Chile

Senior career*
Years	Team	Apps	(Gls)
2005–2009	Universidad de Chile	85	(14)
2006	→ Everton (loan)	23	(2)
2009	Cruz Azul	16	(0)
2010–2011	Argentinos Juniors	39	(4)
2012	Universidad de Chile	7	(1)
2012	Unión Española	22	(4)
2012	Unión Española B	2	(0)
2013–2014	Colo-Colo	22	(2)
2013	Colo-Colo B	2	(0)
2014–2015	Unión La Calera	15	(2)
2015	Coquimbo Unido	8	(0)
2016	San Martín SJ	3	(0)
2016–2017	Deportes Pintana	17	(1)
2017	Audax Italiano	2	(0)
2018	Deportes Melipilla	7	(0)
Total		270	(30)

International career
2008–2010	Chile	7	(0)
- * Club domestic league appearances and goals

Emilio Exequiel Hernández Hernández (born 14 September 1984) is a Chilean former footballer who played as attacking midfielder or forward.

== Career ==
Hernández began his career at Colo-Colo aged 12 in 1996, but after being released, he joined Universidad de Chile one year later, where was promoted to first-adult team in 2005.

In 2006, he was loaned to Everton for acquire more experience, returning in January 2007 to La U now coached by Salvador Capitano.

Following Capitano's period in the bench and caretaker Jorge Socías too, Hernández had rising-up performances under coach Arturo Salah. In 2009, he was a key player in Torneo Apertura obtention under Sergio Markarián orders.

Because his good performances, on 24 July 2009, he joined Mexico's Cruz Azul for a three-year contract in a US$1.3 million fee.

After a poor performance at Cruz Azul, he moved to Argentinos Juniors in a one-year loan deal. He debuted in a 2–2 home draw with Boca Juniors and his first goal came the following week in a 6–3 away win over Lanús.

However, Hernández was a regular player in Borghi's starting lineup, being usually occupied as left winger and conforming an efficient attack alongside Ismael Sosa and Juan Mercier that led Bichos Colorados to win Torneo Clausura title, which was Emilio's first title outside Chile.

After a one-and-half season loan prolongation, he ended his contract with Cruz Azul and failed to continue at La Paternal, being released in December 2011.

== Post-retirement ==
In September 2026, Hernández joined the amateur club Ferroviario Las Cabras from Las Cabras commune.

== Honours ==
Universidad de Chile

- Primera División de Chile (2): 2009 Clausura, 2012 Apertura

Argentinos Juniors

- Argentine Primera División (1): 2010 Clausura

Colo-Colo

- Primera División de Chile (1): 2014 Clausura
