= Gastón Martínez (footballer, born 1989) =

Uruguayan footballer

Personal information
- Full name: Gastón Martínez Menéndez
- Date of birth: 1 December 1989 (age 36)
- Place of birth: Montevideo, Uruguay
- Height: 1.67 m (5 ft 5 1/2 in)
- Position: Midfielder

Team information
- Current team: Sud América
- Number: 17

Senior career*
Years	Team	Apps	(Gls)
2011–2014	El Tanque Sisley	91	(3)
2015	Cerro	8	(0)
2015–2016	Rentistas	35	(0)
2017	El Tanque Sisley	16	(0)
2018–	Sud América	55	(0)
- * Club domestic league appearances and goals as of 20:10, 30 November 2020 (UTC)

Gastón Martínez Menéndez (born 1 December 1989) is a Uruguayan professional footballer who plays as a midfielder for Sud América.

== Career ==
Martínez started his career with El Tanque Sisley. He scored on his professional debut, netting in a 2–1 victory in the Uruguayan Primera División over River Plate on 7 May 2011; another goal followed three weeks later against Miramar Misiones. In total, he featured ninety-three times in all competitions during three years with El Tanque Sisley. Martínez had a seven-month stint with Cerro, prior to joining fellow Primera División side Rentistas in July 2015. Twenty-three appearances followed across the 2015–16 season, which ended with relegation to the Uruguayan Segunda División. On 28 February 2017, Martínez rejoined El Tanque Sisley.

After nineteen appearances in the top-flight for El Tanque Sisley, Martínez departed to complete a move to Sud América in February 2018. Manager Gustavo Bueno selected the midfielder twenty-five times in his debut campaign with the club.

== Career statistics ==
As of 7 December 2018.

Club statistics
Club	Season	League			Cup		League Cup		Continental (Note: Includes the Copa Sudamericana)		Other		Total	
Club	Season	Division	Apps	Goals	Apps	Goals	Apps	Goals	Apps	Goals	Apps	Goals	Apps	Goals
El Tanque Sisley	2010–11	Primera División	4	2	—		—		—		0	0	4	2
El Tanque Sisley	2011–12	Primera División	24	0	—		—		—		0	0	24	0
El Tanque Sisley	2012–13	Primera División	23	0	—		—		—		0	0	23	0
El Tanque Sisley	2013–14	Primera División	28	1	—		—		2 (Note: Two appearances in the 2013 Copa Sudamericana)	0	0	0	30	1
El Tanque Sisley	2014–15	Primera División	12	0	—		—		—		0	0	12	0
El Tanque Sisley	Total		91	3	—		—		2	0	0	0	93	3
Cerro	2014–15	Primera División	8	0	—		—		—		0	0	8	0
Rentistas	2015–16	Primera División	23	0	—		—		—		0	0	23	0
Rentistas	2016	Segunda División	12	0	—		—		—		0	0	12	0
Rentistas	Total		35	0	—		—		—		0	0	35	0
El Tanque Sisley	2017	Primera División	16	0	—		—		—		3 (Note: Three appearances in the 2017 Primera División play-offs)	0	19	0
Sud América	2018	Segunda División	25	0	—		—		—		0	0	25	0
Career total			175	3	—		—		2	0	3	0	180	3
