= Víctor Hugo Sarabia =

Chilean footballer (born 1983)

Personal information
- Full name: Víctor Hugo Sarabia Aguilar
- Date of birth: 27 November 1983 (age 42)
- Place of birth: Iquique, Chile
- Height: 1.68 m (5 ft 6 in)
- Position: Central midfielder

Youth career
- Unión Morro
- Libertad
- Universidad de Chile

Senior career*
| Years | Team | Apps | (Gls) |
| 2005–2006 | Universidad de Chile | 0 | (0) |
| 2005–2006 | → Naval (loan) | 20 | (2) |
| 2006 | Ñublense | 12 | (0) |
| 2007–2011 | Lota Schwager | 45 | (6) |
| 2008–2009 | → Huachipato (loan) | 41 | (5) |
| 2011–2013 | Deportes Iquique | 64 | (7) |
| 2013–2018 | Cobresal | 148 | (11) |
| Total | | 330 | (31) |
- * Club domestic league appearances and goals

Víctor Hugo Sarabia Aguilar (born 27 November 1983) is a Chilean former footballer who played as a central midfielder.

== Career ==
Born in Iquique, Chile, Sarabia was with Unión Morro and Libertad in his city of birth before joining the Universidad de Chile youth system. In 2005–06, he played on loan for Naval in both the second and the third levels of the Chilean football. In his homeland, he also played for Ñublense, Lota Schwager, Huachipato, Deportes Iquique and Cobresal, with whom he won the 2015 Torneo Clausura.

== Personal life ==
Sarabia graduated as a business administrator, started a construction company and manages an aparthotel and a guesthouse in Iquique alongside his wife.
