= Francisco Pizarro (Chilean footballer) =

Chilean footballer (born 1989)

Personal information
- Full name: Francisco Javier Pizarro Cartes
- Date of birth: 10 May 1989 (age 37)
- Place of birth: Osorno, Chile
- Height: 1.68 m (5 ft 6 in)
- Position: Forward

Youth career
- Universidad Católica

Senior career*
Years	Team	Apps	(Gls)
2008–2014	Universidad Católica	90	(16)
2013	→ Cobreloa (loan)	17	(5)
2013	→ O'Higgins (loan)	15	(4)
2014–2015	Barnechea	20	(2)
2015–2016	Unión La Calera	17	(0)
2016	Oman Club	–	(–)
2017	Potros UAEM	13	(0)
2018	Santiago Morning	4	(0)
2019	Colchagua	25	(11)
2020–2021	Colchagua	16	(2)
Total		217	(40)

International career
2008	Chile U23	4	(1)
2008–2012	Chile	3	(0)
2009	Chile U20	3	(0)
- * Club domestic league appearances and goals

Francisco Javier Pizarro Cartes (born 10 May 1989) is a Chilean former footballer who played as a striker.

== Club career ==
=== O'Higgins ===
Pizarro in 2013 signed for O'Higgins on a one-year loan from Universidad Católica. On 10 December 2013, he won the Apertura 2013-14 with O'Higgins. In the tournament, he played in 15 of 18 matches and scored 4 goals.

=== Barnechea ===
In 2014, he is signed by Barnechea for the 2014–15 Chilean Primera División season

== International career ==
Pizarro represented Chile U23 at the 2008 Inter Continental Cup in Malaysia, scoring a goal. The next year he represented Chile U20 at the 2009 South American U-20 Championship.

At senior level, he has been capped three times.

== Honours ==
Universidad Católica

- Primera División de Chile (1): 2010
- Copa Chile (1): 2011

O'Higgins

- Primera División de Chile (1): 2013 Apertura

Individual

- Medalla Santa Cruz de Triana: 2014
