= Renato Ramos =

Chilean footballer and manager (born 1979)

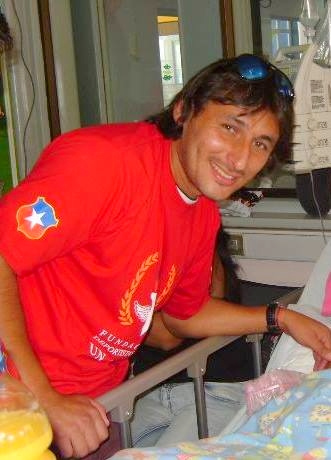
- Ramos in 2014.

Personal information
- Full name: Renato Andrés Ramos Madariaga
- Date of birth: 12 February 1979 (age 47)
- Place of birth: Antofagasta, Chile
- Height: 1.79 m (5 ft 10 in)
- Position: Striker

Team information
- Current team: Lota Schwager (manager)

Youth career
- Everton

Senior career*
Years	Team	Apps	(Gls)
2001–2002	Unión Española	7	(0)
2003–2004	Universidad de Concepción	2	(1)
2005	Everton	36	(16)
2006	Deportes Antofagasta	35	(18)
2007	Tecos B	26	(8)
2008	Audax Italiano	17	(7)
2008–2009	Bolívar	9	(3)
2009–2010	Ñublense	47	(18)
2010–2012	Universidad de Concepción	65	(22)
2013	San Marcos	11	(4)
2013	Lota Schwager	19	(11)
2014–2015	Palestino	41	(17)
2015	Deportes Antofagasta	9	(0)
2016	Barnechea	13	(4)
Total		337	(129)

Managerial career
- 2017–2021: Palestino (youth)
- 2021: Deportes Concepción
- 2023–: Lota Schwager
- * Club domestic league appearances and goals

Renato Andrés Ramos Madariaga (born 12 February 1979) is a Chilean football manager and former footballer. He is currently in charge of Lota Schwager.

== Club career ==
=== Early career ===
Ramos began his career in Chile with Everton de Viña del Mar, at that time of Primera B. He then left Everton and joined Unión Española of the first division of his country. He played two seasons in that team, all in the first division.

Ramos then was followed by Universidad de Concepción in 2003, in where was a frequently player in the starting lineup, which allowed him return to Everton. In his return, his greatest achievement was put end to José María Buljubasich's record of 1,352 minutes without conceding a goal. In 2006, he was signed by Deportes Antofagasta, in where was goalscorer of the team.

In December 2006, was confirmed that Ramos was transferred to the filial of the Mexican team UAG Tecos, Tecos B of the second division of that country. In the second semester, he was named captain of the team and scored 11 goals during the season.

=== Audax Italiano ===
On 11 January 2008, was reported that Audax Italiano have signed the striker for an undisclosed fee. Ramos made his debut in the opening match of the 2008 Clausura tournament against Deportes La Serena in a 0–0 draw. On 7 February, the player made his first appearance for Copa Libertadores in his career against Boyacá Chicó. He scored his first goal at his club's fourth appearance in a 4–1 win over Huachipato.

After one month without play, on 10 April 2008, Ramos scored an historic goal at the 78th minute of game against São Paulo, that ended in a 1–0 win thanks for to him. After of this goal, the player took hold in the first team.

=== Bolívar ===
On 10 July 2008, Ramos signed for the Bolivian side Bolívar in a three-year contract. His first goal in the first division of that country was on his debut against San José in the first week of the season. Their first international goals for the club were against LDU Quito at the Copa Sudamericana's first round, being the second fastest goal of that tournament in a 2–1 home win.

After the club's elimination at Copa Sudamericana, Ramos started to make an offensive duo in the attack with his teammate Joaquín Botero. In the 2008 Bolivian tournament semifinals, Ramos' fifth and decisive penalty was stopped by the keeper of Real Potosí, ultimately resulting in Potosí advancing to the finals. Shortly after, he was released of the club.

=== Ñublense ===
On 21 December 2008, Ramos signed for Chilean side Ñublense a one-year contract.

=== Universidad de Concepción ===
On 2 June 2010, Ramos was released of Ñublense, and returned to Universidad de Concepción, team in where he already played in 2003. His new club, paid US$30.000 for the 25% of the striker's rights.

== Managerial career ==
In 2017, he began his managerial career as manager of Palestino at under-11 level, becoming Director of Football of the all youth levels from 2019 to 2021. At the same time, he has performed as a teacher at the Instituto Nacional del Fútbol (Football National Institute of Chile).

In 2021, he became manager of Chilean Segunda División side Deportes Concepción.

As manager of Lota Schwager, Ramos led them in the promotion to the Segunda División Profesional de Chile.

== Personal life ==
Ramos is nicknamed Tiburón (Shark).

== Club statistics ==
Club Performance
Club	Season	League		Copa Chile		Total
Club	Season	App	Goals	App	Goals	App	Goals
Universidad de Concepción	Torneo 2010	13	4	-	-	13	4
Universidad de Concepción	Apertura 2011	14	6	-	-	14	6
Universidad de Concepción	Clausura 2011	15	4	-	-	15	4
Universidad de Concepción	Apertura 2012	9	5	-	-	9	5
Universidad de Concepción	Clausura 2012	14	3	-	-	14	3
Club Total		65	22	-	-	65	22
