= Pablo Calandria =

Argentine footballer (born 1982)

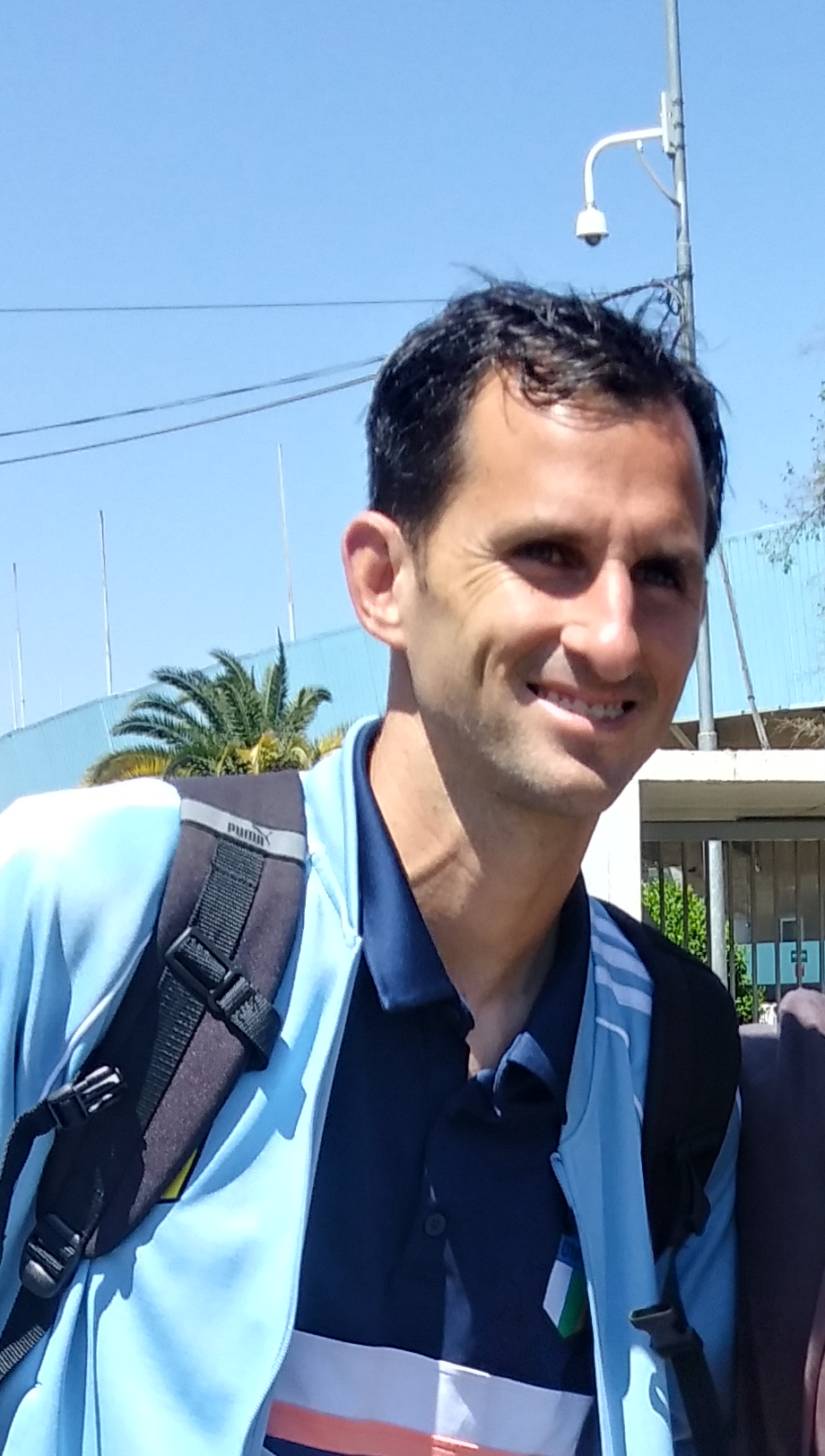
- Calandria as O'Higgins player in 2019.

Personal information
- Full name: Pablo Ignacio Calandria
- Date of birth: 15 March 1982 (age 44)
- Place of birth: Ituzaingó, Argentina
- Height: 1.84 m (6 ft 0 in)
- Position: Striker

Youth career
- 1996–1998: Huracán

Senior career*
Years	Team	Apps	(Gls)
1999	Huracán	6	(0)
1999–2002	Marseille	3	(0)
2000–2001	→ Lens (loan)	23	(1)
2001–2002	→ Málaga (loan)	3	(0)
2002–2004	Leganés	63	(15)
2004–2006	Sporting Gijón	60	(14)
2006–2007	Hércules	24	(6)
2007–2008	Albacete	38	(13)
2008–2009	Gimnasia Esgrima Jujuy	28	(2)
2009	Atlético Tucumán	6	(1)
2010	Santiago Morning	28	(12)
2011	Universidad Católica	24	(7)
2012	Santiago Wanderers	33	(6)
2013–2018	O'Higgins	143	(60)
Total		482	(137)

International career
1999–2000	Argentina U20	8	(6)
- * Club domestic league appearances and goals

Pablo Ignacio Calandria (born 15 March 1982) is an Argentine naturalized Chilean retired footballer who played as a striker.

Nicknamed Cracklandia, he spent most of his professional career in Spain and Chile, notably representing O'Higgins.

== Club career ==
=== Early years / Spain ===
Born in Ituzaingó, Buenos Aires, Calandria played his first professional game for Club Atlético Huracán at the age of only 16. He was almost immediately linked with a transfer to country giants Club Atlético River Plate for a US$850,000 fee, but nothing came of it and was instead acquired by French side Olympique de Marseille.

Calandria was very unsuccessful in his first spells abroad, only scoring once in three full seasons combined with Marseille, RC Lens and Málaga CF. Released by L'OM in the summer of 2002 he continued playing in Spain in the following six years, representing four teams in Segunda División, mainly CD Leganés and Sporting de Gijón.

=== Return to Argentina ===
Calandria scored his first goal in the Argentine Primera División while playing for Gimnasia y Esgrima de Jujuy, in a 1–2 away defeat against San Lorenzo de Almagro for the 2008 Apertura tournament.

After being relegated he joined Atlético Tucumán, netting in his debut.

=== Chile ===
In 2010, Calandria signed for Santiago Morning in the Chilean Primera División, going on to remain in the country in the following years, with Club Deportivo Universidad Católica and Santiago Wanderers. In 2013 he won the Apertura with O'Higgins FC, scoring nine goals in 17 matches including a penalty against C.S.D. Rangers in the final minute that resulted in a 4–3 home win and qualified to the final against Club Deportivo Universidad Católica.

Calandria participated with the team in the 2014 edition of the Copa Libertadores. In the tournament, he scored through a penalty against Cerro Porteño but also missed one against Club Atlético Lanús in the last match, in an eventual group stage exit.

On 3 May 2014, whilst playing in the Supercopa de Chile against Deportes Iquique, Calandria suffered an anterior cruciate ligament injury to his knee, being sidelined for six months. He returned to action in January of the following year, against Unión La Calera.

== International career ==
Calandria played for Argentina at under–17 and under–20 levels.

== Style of play ==
Calandria stood out for his aerial ability, and was also a competent penalty taker.

== Honours ==
Universidad Católica

- Copa Chile: 2011

O'Higgins

- Primera División de Chile: 2013–14 Apertura
- Supercopa de Chile: 2014
