= Ever Cantero =

Paraguayan footballer (born 1985)

Personal information
- Full name: Ever Milton Cantero Benítez
- Date of birth: 3 December 1985 (age 40)
- Place of birth: Asunción, Paraguay
- Height: 1.78 m (5 ft 10 in)
- Position: Striker

Team information
- Current team: Guaireña (youth) (coach)

Youth career
- River Plate

Senior career*
Years	Team	Apps	(Gls)
2003	River Plate Asunción		
2004	Cerro Porteño PF		
2005	General Caballero ZC	9	(0)
2006	Deportes Puerto Montt	26	(10)
2007	Palestino	28	(2)
2008	Ñublense	40	(10)
2009–2010	Cobreloa	47	(14)
2011	Santiago Morning	22	(13)
2012	Bolívar	23	(8)
2013–2019	Cobresal	142	(62)
2020–2021	Guaireña	5	(0)

Managerial career
- 2023–: Guaireña (youth)
- 2024: Guaireña (interim)
- * Club domestic league appearances and goals

Ever Milton Cantero Benítez (born 3 December 1985) is a Paraguayan former footballer who played as a striker. He currently works as coach for the Guaireña youth ranks.

== Club career ==
Cantero began his career playing for River Plate of his country in 2003, after signed by Cerro de Franco and General Caballero, also of his country.

Cantero arrives to Chile on the year 2006, to play por Deportes Puerto Montt. In this team, he made a good tournament and made than Universidad Catolica was interested him, he was signed with this team, but not accepted him, because it had not passed the medical examinations.

Later, Cantero signed for Palestino, in when remained one year, after signed for Ñublense, in when he made a good tournament, scoring six goals for the league, one of this goals was scoring to Colo-Colo, in a result of 1-0 in the 18th minute. In the second semester of 2008, Cantero scored four goals for the league and one goal for Copa Chile.

In 2009, Cantero signed for O'Higgins, but one month later Cantero go out of the club for personal problems, and later signed for Cobreloa, in this club Cantero not made a good tournament as in the other tournament, his club ended in 10th position and scored five goals, in the second semester was worse his club ended in the 14th position, and just scored two goals.

His last club was Guaireña in his homeland.

== Coaching career ==
Following to play for Guaireña, Cantero became a coach for the youth ranks of them. In May 2024, he assumed as interim coach of the first team until Ricardo García became the manager.

== Honours ==
=== Player ===
Cobresal

- Primera División de Chile (1): 2015 Clausura
