= Mauricio Zenteno =

Chilean footballer (born 1984)

Personal information
- Full name: Mauricio Alejandro Zenteno Morales
- Date of birth: 21 April 1984 (age 42)
- Place of birth: Linares, Chile
- Height: 1.73 m (5 ft 8 in)
- Position: Centre back

Youth career
- 1997–1999: Linares Unido
- 1999–2003: Universidad Católica

Senior career*
Years	Team	Apps	(Gls)
2004–2009	Universidad Católica	145	(0)
2008	→ Huachipato (loan)	16	(0)
2010	Huachipato	11	(0)
2010–2011	Deportes La Serena	46	(0)
2012–2021	Deportes Iquique	257	(1)
Total		475	(1)

International career
2006–2007	Chile	10	(0)
- * Club domestic league appearances and goals

Mauricio Alejandro Zenteno Morales (Spanish pronunciation: [mawˈɾisjo aleˈxandɾo senˈteno moˈɾales], born 21 April 1984) is a Chilean former footballer who played as a centre back.

== Career ==
Zenteno joined the Universidad Católica youth ranks at the age of 15.

He retired at the end of the 2021 season.

== Honours ==
Universidad Católica

- Primera División de Chile (1): 2005 Clausura

Deportes Iquique

- Copa Chile (1): 2013–14
