= Manuel Villalobos =

Chilean retired footballer (born 1980)

Personal information
- Full name: Manuel Arturo Villalobos Salvo
- Date of birth: 15 October 1980 (age 46)
- Place of birth: Iquique, Chile
- Height: 1.71 m (5 ft 7 in)
- Position: Striker

Team information
- Current team: Deportes Iquique (caretaker)

Youth career
- 1990–1999: Colo-Colo

Senior career*
Years	Team	Apps	(Gls)
1997–2001	Colo-Colo	11	(0)
2000	→ Fernández Vial (loan)	25	(11)
2001	→ O'Higgins (loan)	8	(0)
2001	→ Deportes Talcahuano (loan)	17	(7)
2002	Deportes Iquique	32	(20)
2003	Dragões Sandinenses	10	(2)
2003	Deportes Arica	14	(3)
2004	Deportes Copiapó	18	(4)
2005–2007	Ñublense	103	(45)
2008–2009	Universidad de Chile	70	(27)
2010–2012	Huachipato	99	(38)
2013–2017	Deportes Iquique	129	(45)
2018	Santiago Wanderers	10	(0)
Total		546	(202)

International career
1997	Chile U17	3	(1)
2013	Chile	1	(0)

Managerial career
- 2022–: Deportes Iquique (youth)
- 2022: Deportes Iquique (caretaker)
- 2025–: Deportes Iquique (caretaker)
- * Club domestic league appearances and goals

Manuel Arturo Villalobos Salvo (born 15 October 1980) is a Chilean former footballer and current manager. He is the current caretaker manager of Deportes Iquique.

== Playing career ==
Villalobos joined Colo-Colo's youth squad at the age of ten in 1990. In 1997, he made his professional debut. In 2000, he was loaned to Fernández Vial to gain more playing time and experience. During his time with Fernández Vial he was the second leading scorer of the Primera B (Chilean Second Division). After his impressive season Villalobos was loaned six months to Primera División (Chilean First Division) squad O'Higgins. He then spent the next six months with Deportes Talcahuano. During these two years Villalobos was rejected a chance to return to his original club, Colo-Colo. In 2002 Colo-Colo's coach Jaime Pizarro released him from his contract due to indiscipline.

In 2002 Villalobos signed with Deportes Iquique. The following year Villalobos signed with Portuguese club S.C. Dragões Sandinenses, where he was primarily used as a reserve. The following two years Villalobos spent in the Chilean Third Division where he scored in abundance. However, since he was not owned by any first-tier club, his accomplishments were not taken seriously. During this time he thought about leaving football for good.

Ñublense, another third division squad, signed Villalobos. Ñublense quickly gained promotion to the Primera B and Villalobos began to regain his interest in football. At the end of the 2006, with Villalobos as the team's top goal scorer and team captain, Ñublense was promoted to the Primera División. In the 2007 Clausura tournament, Villalobos was the second leading scorer of the competition with 13 goals. His good form led Universidad de Chile (Colo-Colo's rival) to sign him to a 2-year contract at the beginning of 2008. Villalobos has said in interviews he hopes to score many goals against Colo-Colo. In the January pre-season matches, Villalobos scored in almost every game. In the 2008 Apertura tournament Villalobos has scored four goals in the first six games. On January 11 he signed a 1-year contract with Huachipato of Chile.

Villalobos played for Chile at the 1997 FIFA U-17 World Championship in Egypt.

== Coaching career ==
Since 2022, he works as coach of the Deportes Iquique youth ranks. In April and October of the same year he has assumed as caretaker coach of the first team.

== Personal life ==
His son, Benjamín, is a footballer from the Deportes Iquique youth system who signed with Irish club Bray Wanderers in April 2025.

== Honours ==
=== Player ===
Colo-Colo

- Primera División de Chile (1): 1998

Universidad de Chile

- Primera División de Chile (1): 2009 Apertura

Huachipato

- Primera División de Chile (1): 2012 Clausura

Deportes Iquique

- Copa Chile (1): 2013–14
