= 2013–14 Copa Chile =

Copa Chile MTS

Tournament details
- Country: Chile
- Teams: 32

Final positions
- Champions: Deportes Iquique
- Runners-up: Huachipato

Tournament statistics
- Top goal scorer: Rodrigo Díaz (8 goals)

The 2013–14 Copa Chile, (officially known as Copa Chile MTS 2013/14 because of its sponsorship), was the 34th edition of the Copa Chile, the country's national cup tournament. The competition started on June 23, 2013 with the First Round and concludes on 2014 with the Final. The winner qualifies for the 2014 Copa Sudamericana and the 2014 Supercopa de Chile.

== Schedule ==
Round	Date
First Round	June 25, 2013; August 14, 2013
Second Round	September 7, 2013; October 13, 2013
Quarterfinals	November 12, 2013; November 20, 2013
Semifinals	January 28, 2014; February 6, 2014
Final	April 16, 2014

== Teams ==
A total 32 clubs were accepted for the competition. For this edition the teams are from the Primera División and Primera B, only.

== First round ==
On this round every team plays home and away against every other team in its group. The best 2 teams from each group advance to the next round.

=== Group 1 ===
Team	Pld	W	D	L	GF	GA	GD	Pts	DCON	DTEM	ÑUBL	UCHI
Deportes Concepción (A)	6	2	4	0	10	6	+4	10		3–0	2–2	2–1
Deportes Temuco (A)	6	3	1	2	8	6	+2	10	0–0		4–1	0–1
Ñublense	6	1	3	2	11	14	−3	6	1–1	1–3		4–2
Universidad de Chile	6	1	2	3	8	11	−3	5	2–2	0–1	2–2	

Legend: Blue = home team win; Yellow = draw; Red = away team win.
(A) Advanced to Knockout stage

=== Group 2 ===
Team	Pld	W	D	L	GF	GA	GD	Pts	UCON	HUAC	LSCH	NAVA
Universidad de Concepción (A)	6	2	4	0	7	3	+4	10		1–1	0–0	3–0
Huachipato (A)	6	2	4	0	5	3	+2	10	1–1		0–0	1–0
Lota Schwager	6	0	5	1	4	5	−1	5	0–2	1–1		2–2
Naval	6	0	3	3	4	9	−5	3	1–1	0–1	1–1	

Legend: Blue = home team win; Yellow = draw; Red = away team win.
(A) Advanced to Knockout stage

=== Group 3 ===
Team	Pld	W	D	L	GF	GA	GD	Pts	OHIG	CURI	AUDI	MAGA
O'Higgins (A)	6	4	0	2	10	5	+5	12		1–0	0–1	0–1
Curicó Unido (A)	6	2	2	2	6	6	0	8	2–3		1–0	1–0
Audax Italiano	6	2	2	2	8	9	−1	8	0–4	1–1		2–2
Magallanes	6	1	2	3	6	10	−4	5	1–2	1–1	1–4	

Legend: Blue = home team win; Yellow = draw; Red = away team win.
(A) Advanced to Knockout stage

=== Group 4 ===
Team	Pld	W	D	L	GF	GA	GD	Pts	UCAT	PALE	UESP	BARN
Universidad Católica (A)	6	4	2	0	12	5	+7	14		0–0	2–1	4–0
Palestino (A)	6	3	1	2	10	8	+2	10	1–2		5–2	2–0
Unión Española	6	1	2	3	11	13	−2	5	2–2	3–0		2–3
Barnechea	6	1	1	4	6	13	−7	4	1–2	1–2	1–1	

Legend: Blue = home team win; Yellow = draw; Red = away team win.
(A) Advanced to Knockout stage

=== Group 5 ===
Team	Pld	W	D	L	GF	GA	GD	Pts	COLO	USFE	SMOR	RANG
Colo-Colo (A)	6	4	1	1	12	5	+7	13		2–3	1–0	2–0
Unión San Felipe (A)	6	3	3	0	12	8	+4	12	2–2		2–1	1–1
Santiago Morning	6	1	1	4	3	8	−5	4	0–2	1–3		1–0
Rangers	6	0	3	3	2	8	−6	3	0–3	1–1	0–0	

Legend: Blue = home team win; Yellow = draw; Red = away team win.
(A) Advanced to Knockout stage

=== Group 6 ===
Team	Pld	W	D	L	GF	GA	GD	Pts	EVER	SLUI	SWAN	ULCA
Everton (A)	6	4	0	2	7	4	+3	12		0–1	2–0	2–0
San Luis (A)	6	3	2	1	7	5	+2	11	2–0		1–3	1–1
Santiago Wanderers	6	3	1	2	12	8	+4	10	1–2	1–1		3–1
Unión La Calera	6	0	1	5	3	12	−9	1	0–1	0–1	1–4	

Legend: Blue = home team win; Yellow = draw; Red = away team win.
(A) Advanced to Knockout stage

=== Group 7 ===
Team	Pld	W	D	L	GF	GA	GD	Pts	COQU	CSAL	DCOP	DLSE
Coquimbo Unido (A)	6	3	2	1	6	2	+4	11		1–0	3–0	0–2
Cobresal (A)	6	2	3	1	8	5	+3	9	0–0		4–1	2–1
Deportes Copiapó	6	1	3	2	5	9	−4	6	0–0	1–1		2–0
Deportes La Serena	6	1	2	3	5	8	−3	5	0–2	1–1	1–1	

Legend: Blue = home team win; Yellow = draw; Red = away team win.
(A) Advanced to Knockout stage

=== Group 8 ===
Team	Pld	W	D	L	GF	GA	GD	Pts	CLOA	DIQU	DANT	SMAR
Cobreloa (A)	6	4	2	0	10	4	+6	14		3–3	1–0	1–0
Deportes Iquique (A)	6	3	1	2	12	8	+4	10	0–1		4–0	3–2
Deportes Antofagasta	6	2	1	3	5	10	−5	7	0–3	2–0		1–0
San Marcos de Arica	6	0	2	4	5	10	−5	2	1–1	0–2	2–2	

Legend: Blue = home team win; Yellow = draw; Red = away team win.
(A) Advanced to Knockout stage

== Second round ==
Team 1	Agg.	Team 2	1st leg	2nd leg
O'Higgins	6–1	Palestino	5–0	1–1
Deportes Concepción	1–1 (3-4p)	Huachipato	0–0	1–1
Deportes Temuco	0–0 (5-3p)	Universidad de Concepción	0–0	0–0
Unión San Felipe	1–1 (5-4p)	Everton	1–0	0–1
San Luis	6–3	Colo-Colo	4–3	2–0
Coquimbo Unido	2–5	Deportes Iquique	0–2	2–3
Cobresal	2–2 (3-1p)	Cobreloa	0–0	2–2
Curicó Unido	1–3	Universidad Católica	1–1	0–2

== Quarterfinals ==
Team 1	Agg.	Team 2	1st leg	2nd leg
Deportes Temuco	0–6	Huachipato	0–4	0–2
Cobresal	0–2	Deportes Iquique	0–1	0–1
Unión San Felipe	4–3	San Luis	1–1	3–2
O'Higgins	3–3 (4-5p)	Universidad Católica	2–1	1–2

== Semifinals ==
=== First leg ===
28 January 2014	Huachipato	1–0	Universidad Católica	Talcahuano
	Morales 6'			Stadium: Estadio CAP; Attendance: 4,094; Referee: Patricio Polic

29 January 2014	Unión San Felipe	0–2	Deportes Iquique	San Felipe
			Pinares 18'; Martínez 88'	Stadium: Estadio Municipal de San Felipe; Attendance: 2,000; Referee: Jorge Osorio

=== Second leg ===
5 February 2014	Universidad Católica	1–2 (1–3 agg.)	Huachipato	Santiago
	Muñoz 73'		Reynero 17'; Llanos 90+1'	Stadium: Estadio San Carlos de Apoquindo; Attendance: 5,000; Referee: Claudio Puga

6 February 2014	Deportes Iquique	1–0 (3–0 agg.)	Unión San Felipe	Iquique
	Mazzolatti 75'			Stadium: Estadio Tierra de Campeones; Attendance: 3,292; Referee: Eduardo Gamboa

== Final ==
16 April 2014
21:30

Huachipato	1–3	Deportes Iquique
Arrué 84' (pen.)	Report	4' Villalobos; 12' (o.g.) Crovetto; 86' Pinares

Estadio Monumental David Arellano, Santiago
Attendance: 4,950
Referee: Julio Bascuñán

Copa Chile
2013–14 Champion

Deportes Iquique
Third Title

== Top goalscorers ==
Pos	Player	Club	Goals
1	(Argentina) Rodrigo Díaz	Deportes Iquique	8
2	(Argentina) Pablo Calandria	O'Higgins	7
3	(Argentina) Carlos Salom	Deportes Concepción	5
3	(Paraguay) Cris Martinez	San Luis	5
