= Lino Maldonado =

Chilean footballer (born 1989)

Personal information
- Full name: Lino Waldemar Maldonado Gárnica
- Date of birth: 8 February 1989 (age 37)
- Place of birth: Santiago, Chile
- Height: 1.74 m (5 ft 9 in)
- Position: Forward

Senior career*
Years	Team	Apps	(Gls)
2009–2019	Cobresal		
2011	→ San Antonio (loan)		
2012	→ Unión Temuco (loan)		
2013	→ Iberia (loan)		
- * Club domestic league appearances and goals as of 22 March 2020

Lino Waldemar Maldonado Gárnica (born 8 February 1989) is a Chilean footballer.

He played for Cobresal.

== Honours ==
=== Player ===
Cobresal

- Primera División de Chile (1): 2015 Apertura
