= Mauricio Gómez =

Chilean footballer (born 1989)

Personal information
- Full name: Mauricio Alejandro Gómez Rios
- Date of birth: March 5, 1989 (age 37)
- Place of birth: Laja, Chile
- Height: 1.75 m (5 ft 9 in)
- Position: Striker

Youth career
- Universidad de Chile

Senior career*
Years	Team	Apps	(Gls)
2006–2010	Universidad de Chile	27	(5)
2010	→ Universidad de Concepción (loan)	23	(3)
2011	Santiago Morning	20	(6)
2012	Rangers	33	(7)
2013	Ñublense	14	(2)
2013	Ñublense B	4	(2)
2013–2014	Rangers	33	(10)
2015–2016	Deportes Temuco	41	(6)
2016–2017	Universitario de Sucre	16	(3)
2017	Iberia	15	(7)
2018	Santiago Wanderers	6	(0)
2018	Deportes Recoleta	8	(0)
Total		240	(51)

International career
2009	Chile U20	4	(3)
2009	Chile U21	3	(0)
- * Club domestic league appearances and goals

Mauricio Alejandro Gómez Rios (born March 5, 1989) is a Chilean former footballer who played as a striker.

== Club career ==
Gómez nickname is "Hormona" because on his youth squads he was usually taller than his teammates. He came through the youth system of Universidad de Chile, being the top scorer at most levels. His professional debut came in the 2006 Clausura tournament against Cobreloa, in which he scored. Since his debut he has not seen much playing time. He also received some criticism from Universidad de Chile's former coach Arturo Salah. For Apertura 2010 Tournament he will play for Universidad de Concepción of Chile, on loan for 1 year.

== International career ==
Gómez represented Chile U20 in the 2009 South American Championship, scoring 3 goals. In addition, he took part of the Chile U21 squad that won the 2009 Toulon Tournament.

== Honours ==
=== Club ===
Universidad de Chile

- Primera División de Chile (1): 2009 Apertura

Deportes Temuco

- Primera B (1): 2015–16

=== International ===
Chile U21

- Toulon Tournament (1): 2009
