= Estadio El Cobre de El Salvador =

Stadium in El Salvador, Chile

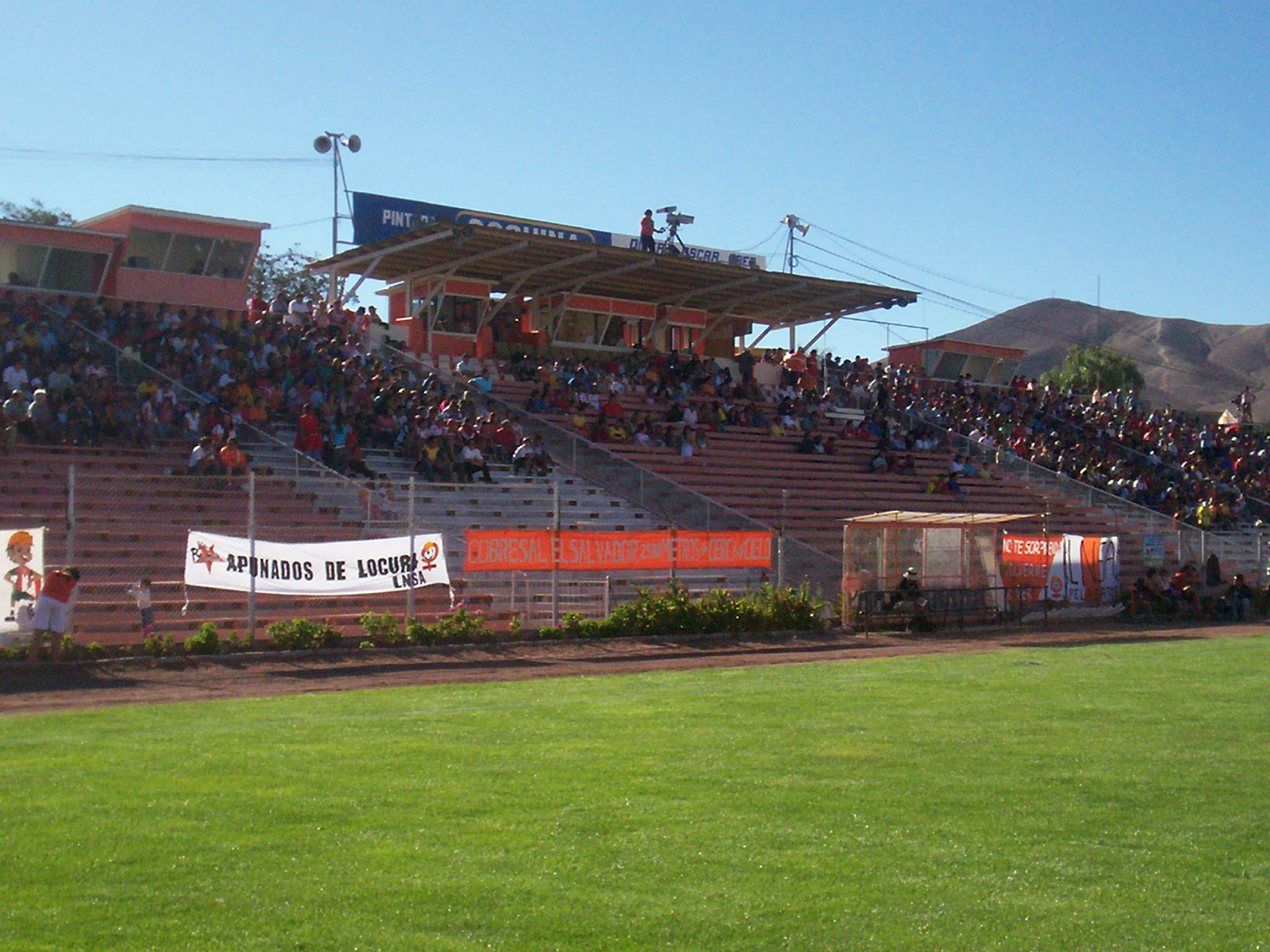
- Estadio El Cobre
- Interactive map of Estadio El Cobre de El Salvador
- Location: El Salvador, Chile
- Coordinates: 26°15′7″S 69°37′43″W
- Capacity: 11,240
- Surface: grass
- Field size: 105 x 75 m

Construction
- Opened: June 1, 1980
- Architect: Mario Recordón

Tenant
- Cobresal

Estadio El Cobre is a multi-use stadium in El Salvador, Chile. It is currently used mostly for football matches and is the home stadium of Cobresal. The stadium holds 12,000 people, which is more than the population of the town it is in, and was built in 1980.
