= Jorge Osorio =

Chilean football referee

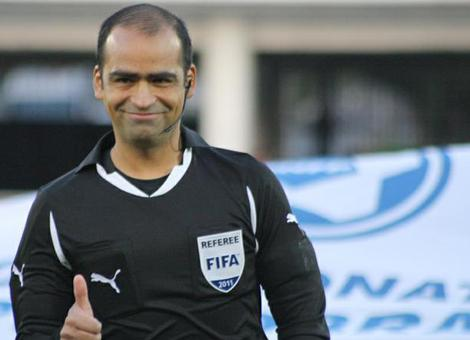
- Osorio in 2011
- Full name: Jorge Osorio Reyes
- Born: 26 June 1977 (age 49); Chile

International
Years	League	Role
2009-2017	FIFA	Referee

Jorge Osorio Reyes (Note: In this Spanish name, the first or paternal surname is Osorio and the second or maternal family name is Reyes.) (born 26 June 1977) is a Chilean professional football referee, who officiates the Campeonato Nacional of Chile and the Copa Chile as well as other various South American tournaments. Osorio is a CONMEBOL category 2 referee. He was appointed as a FIFA referee in 2009.

== Tournaments officiated ==
Osorio's first international tournament was the 2006 Copa Sudamericana in which he officiated a game between Chilean clubs Huachipato and Colo-Colo. In this match, Osorio issued 2 red cards to Huachipato and awarded a penalty to Colo-Colo who went on to win the match 2-1.

Osorio officiated 5 games at the 2007 South American Under-17 Football Championship including 2 group stage games and 3 final stage games.

He also officiated 4 games at the 2009 South American Under-17 Football Championship which included 3 group stage games and 1 final stage game.

The Copa Chile final of the 2008-09 season between Deportes Ovalle and Universidad de Concepción was officiated by Osorio.

Osorio officiated 1st round games at the 2009 Copa Sudamericana and the 2010 Copa Sudamericana. In 2010, he also officiated 2 group stage games in the Copa Libertadores and officiated 2 group stage games and the final of the 2010 Tournoi Espoirs de Toulon.

In 2011, Osorio officiated games at the Under-20 Copa Sudamericana and the 2011 Copa Libertadores. Osorio officiated games at the 2015 Copa Libertadores and the 2015 Copa Sudamericana. In 2016, he officiated games at the Under-20 Copa Libertadores including a semifinal. He also officiated two friendlies in 2016 between Argentina and Honduras in May and Argentina and Bolivia in June.

== Statistics ==
Type	Per Game	Total
Penalty	0.42	11
Yellow Card	4.38	114
Red Card	0.38	10
