= Estadio Fiscal de Talca =

Stadium in Talca, Chile

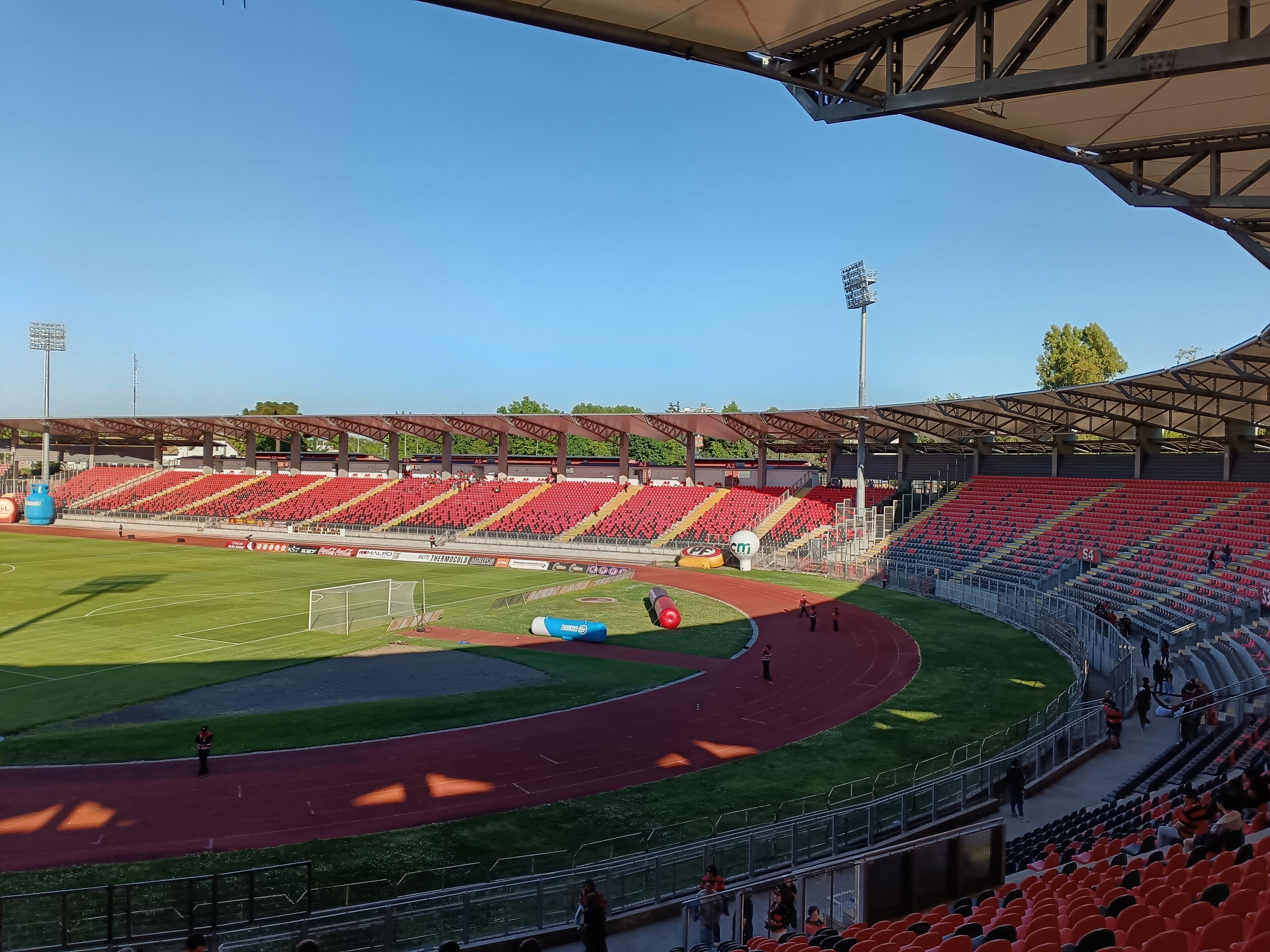
- Interactive map of Estadio Fiscal de Talca
- Location: Talca, Chile
- Coordinates: 35°25′11″S 71°40′26″W
- Owner: Instituto Nacional de Deportes
- Operator: Instituto Nacional de Deportes
- Capacity: 16,070
- Surface: Grass
- Field size: 105 x 68 m.

Construction
- Opened: 1930
- Renovated: 2011
- Expanded: 2019

Tenant
- Rangers de Talca

The Estadio Bicentenario Iván Azocar Bernales (also known as Estadio Bicentenario Fiscal de Talca Iván "Pocholo" Azocar Bernales) is a multi-use public stadium in Talca, Chile. It is currently used mostly for association football matches and is the home stadium of Rangers.

The stadium was built in 1930 as "Estadio Municipal de Talca". after seven years, in 1937, it would pass into the hands of the State and began to be called "Estadio Fiscal", with an original capacity of 17,000. In 2011 it was completely renovated, and currently holds 8,200 people (all seated).

In July 2017, the Government of Chile announced that the stadium will expand its seating capacity to 16,000 by building the North and South ends. The expansion will cost CLP6,811,716,000 (USD11,352,860) and was completed in 2019, It has a capacity of 16,070 spectators after the renovations, making it the largest stadium in the Maule Region.

In addition to football, the Fiscal de Talca stadium has a track for athletics, inaugurated in the 1990s as a joint venture between the Chilean and Spanish governments.
