= 2011 Campeonato Nacional Primera División =

Campeonato Nacional Petrobras
- Season: 2011
- Champions: Apertura: Universidad de Chile; Clausura: Universidad de Chile
- Relegated: Santiago Morning; Ñublense
- 2012 Copa Libertadores: Universidad de Chile; Universidad Católica; Unión Española
- 2011 Copa Sudamericana: Universidad Católica; Universidad de Chile
- 2012 Copa Sudamericana: Cobreloa
- Matches: 338
- Top goalscorer: A: Matías Urbano (12 goals); C: Sebastián Pinto (13 goals)
- Biggest home win: Audax Italiano 5–0 Santiago Morning (August 28); Santiago Morning 5–0 Cobresal (October 29)
- Biggest away win: Unión San Felipe 0–5 Ñublense (March 19)
- Highest scoring: Cobresal 4–3 U. de Concepcion (April 10); Unión Española 4–3 La Serena (April 30); Universidad Católica 5–2 Cobresal (April 24); Cobreloa 3–4 Audax Italiano (September 11)
- Highest attendance: 44,870; Universidad de Chile v Cobreloa
- Lowest attendance: 441; Santiago Morning v Huachipato
- Total attendance: 1,849,380
- Average attendance: 5,472

The 2011 Primera División del Fútbol Profesional Chileno season (known as the 2011 Campeonato Nacional Petrobras for sponsorship reasons) was the 80th season of top-flight football in Chile. Universidad Católica was the defending champion. Universidad de Chile won both the Apertura and the Clausura Championships

== Format changes ==
For the 2011, the ANFP's Council of Club Presidents approved the return to the Apertura and Clausura format, with playoffs.

== Teams ==
Eighteen teams will be competing in the Primera División for the 2011 season, sixteen of whom are returning from the 2010 season. Everton and San Luis were relegated last season after finishing 17th and 18th overall, respectively. There were replaced by Iquique and Unión La Calera, the 2010 Primera B winner and runner-up, respectively.

Locations of the 2011 Primera División teams.

Team	City	Stadium	Current manager
Audax Italiano	Santiago	Municipal de La Florida	Omar Labruna
Cobreloa	Calama	Municipal de Calama	Nelson Acosta
Cobresal	El Salvador	El Cobre	Luis Musrri
Colo-Colo	Santiago	Monumental David Arellano	Ivo Basay
Huachipato	Talcahuano	CAP	Jorge Pellicer
Iquique	Iquique	Tierra de Campeones	Fernando Vergara
La Serena	La Serena	La Portada	Miguel Ponce
Ñublense	Chillán	Municipal Nelson Oyarzún Arenas	Carlos Rojas
O'Higgins	Rancagua	El Teniente	José Cantillana
Palestino	Santiago	Municipal de La Cisterna	Gustavo Benítez
Santiago Morning	Santiago	Municipal de La Pintana	Hernán Godoy
Santiago Wanderers	Valparaíso	Regional Chiledeportes	Héctor Robles
Unión Española	Santiago	Santa Laura	José Luis Sierra
Unión La Calera	La Calera	Municipal Nicolás Chahuán	Emiliano Astorga
Unión San Felipe	San Felipe	Municipal de San Felipe	Víctor Hugo Marchesini
Universidad Católica	Santiago	San Carlos de Apoquindo	Mario Lepe
Universidad de Chile	Santiago	Nacional	Jorge Sampaoli
Universidad de Concepción	Concepción	Municipal de Concepción	Víctor Hugo Castañeda

=== Managerial changes ===
Note: this list is incomplete. You can help Wikipedia by expanding it.

Team	Outgoing head coach	Manner of departure	Date of vacancy	Incoming head coach	Date of appointment	Position in table
Pre-season changes
Cobreloa	Mario Soto	Resigned	December 8, 2010	Nelson Acosta	December 11, 2010	N/A
Universidad de Chile	Gerardo Pelusso	End of Contract	December 12, 2010	Jorge Sampaoli	December 15, 2010	N/A
La Serena	Víctor Hugo Castañeda	End of Contract	December 15, 2010	Fernando Vergara	December 24, 2010	N/A
Apertura changes
Colo-Colo	Diego Cagna	Resigned	February 13, 2011	Américo Gallego	February 21, 2011	18th
Iquique	José Cantillana	Sacked	February 22, 2011	Jorge Pellicer	February 26, 2011	17th
Universidad de Concepción	Jaime Vera	Resigned	February 27, 2011	Mauricio Riffo	February 28, 2011	11th
Universidad de Concepción	Mauricio Riffo	Resigned	April 29, 2011	Víctor Hugo Castañeda	April 29, 2011	15th
Ñublense	Luis Marcoleta	Sacked	May 2, 2011	Jorge Garcés	May 3, 2011	18th
Pre-clausura changes
La Serena	Fernando Vergara	Resigned	May 29, 2011	Miguel Ponce	June 6, 2011	N/A
Universidad Católica	Juan Antonio Pizzi	Resigned	June 23, 2011	Mario Lepe	June 26, 2011	N/A
Clausura changes
Unión San Felipe	Nelson Cossio	Resigned	August 1, 2011	Víctor Hugo Marchesini	August 27, 2011	17th
Santiago Wanderers	Juan Manuel Llop	Sacked	August 3, 2011	Héctor Robles	August 3, 2011	11th
Iquique	Jorge Pellicer	Resigned	August 13, 2011	Fernando Vergara	August 17, 2011	18th
Colo-Colo	Américo Gallego	Sacked	August 18, 2011	Ivo Basay	August 30, 2011	12th
O'Higgins	Ivo Basay	Resigned	August 23, 2011	José Cantillana	September 20, 2011	5th
Huachipato	Arturo Salah	Resigned	September 1, 2011	Jorge Pellicer	September 12, 2011	7th
Santiago Morning	Fernando Díaz	Resigned	September 4, 2011	Hernán Godoy	September 6, 2011	18th
Ñublense	Jorge Garcés	Resigned	September 12, 2011			18th

== Torneo Apertura ==
The Torneo Apertura began on January 28 and ended on June 12.

=== Classification stage ===
The Classification Stage began on January 28 and ended on May 22.

==== Standings ====
Pos	Team	Pld	W	D	L	GF	GA	GD	Pts	Qualification
1	Universidad Católica	17	11	5	1	34	18	+16	38	2011 Copa Sudamericana first stage
2	Universidad de Chile	17	10	5	2	39	20	+19	35	2011 Copa Sudamericana playoffs
3	Unión Española	17	9	5	3	33	18	+15	32	Playoffs
4	Palestino	17	9	3	5	26	20	+6	30	Playoffs
5	O'Higgins	17	8	3	6	29	26	+3	27	Playoffs
6	Unión La Calera	17	7	4	6	18	18	0	25	Playoffs
7	Unión San Felipe	17	7	3	7	24	21	+3	24	Playoffs
8	Colo-Colo	17	7	3	7	28	26	+2	24 (Note: Colo-Colo lost three points for not present hiring files of midfielder Joan Muñoz during the game against Cobresal, so that Colo-Colo lost for walkover.)	Playoffs
9	Huachipato	17	6	4	7	24	27	−3	22	
10	Deportes La Serena	17	5	6	6	28	28	0	21	
11	Audax Italiano	17	6	3	8	24	28	−4	21	
12	Deportes Iquique	17	5	6	6	18	22	−4	21 (Note: Deportes Iquique qualified for the 2011 Copa Sudamericana second stage as 2010 Copa Chile Bicentenario winners. They also lost three points for not submitting hiring files of goalkeepers coach Luis Villaroel during tournament's second week-match against Universidad Católica.)	2011 Copa Sudamericana second stage
13	Universidad de Concepción	17	6	2	9	24	26	−2	20	
14	Santiago Wanderers	17	5	4	8	23	31	−8	19	
15	Cobreloa	17	4	6	7	16	22	−6	18	
16	Santiago Morning	17	3	7	7	22	30	−8	16	
17	Cobresal	17	5	1	11	26	41	−15	16	
18	Ñublense	17	4	2	11	17	31	−14	14	

Source: Asociación Nacional de Fútbol Profesional
Rules for classification: 1. Points; 2. Wins; 3. Goal difference; 4. Goals scored; 5. Away goals; 6. Red cards; 7. Yellow cards; 8. Draw.

==== Results ====
Home \ Away	AUD	COB	CSL	CC	IQU	SER	HUA	ÑUB	OHI	PAL	SM	SW	UE	ULC	USF	UC	UCH	UDC
Audax Italiano		1–0	3–2	2–1					1–3	1–3		4–0	1–2		2–1			
Cobreloa			1–0		0–0	3–3			2–3	1–0				0–1	1–1		1–4	
Cobresal							3–2	1–2		2–1	1–4			3–1	2–2		2–5	4–3
Colo-Colo			0–3		1–1	4–1			5–1					2–0		1–1		1–5
Deportes Iquique	2–0		1–1					2–1						1–0	1–1	0–2	2–2	1–3
Deportes La Serena	2–3		2–1		0–0				1–2	2–3	0–0	3–1				2–2	1–1	
Huachipato	1–1	1–1			3–1	0–4		3–1	2–1			3–1					1–3	1–0
Ñublense	0–0	2–1		2–3		2–3			2–3		1–1	2–0	0–5		1–0			
O'Higgins			3–3		0–1					1–2		1–1	0–0	2–0		2–3	1–1	
Palestino				0–3	1–0		1–0	1–0					1–2	1–1		1–2		3–2
Santiago Morning	2–2	1–1		0–1	3–1		1–1		2–4	0–4			1–1	1–1				
Santiago Wanderers		2–0	3–0	2–1						1–1				1–1	1–2			2–1
Unión Española			3–0	1–2	3–0	4–3	4–2					2–1		3–1		0–0		
Unión La Calera	3–1					2–0	0–0	2–0							1–0	2–1	0–2	2–0
Unión San Felipe				2–0		0–1	2–1		3–1	2–3	3–1		1–1			1–2		1–3
Universidad Católica	3–1	2–0	5–2				2–1	2–0			2–1	1–1	0–0				2–2	
Universidad de Chile	2–1			2–1				3–1		0–0	1–2		2–1		0–2			
Universidad de Concepción	1–0	0–1				0–0		1–0	0–1		2–1					1–2	1–5	

Source: Asociación Nacional de Fútbol Profesional
Legend: Blue = home team win; Yellow = draw; Red = away team win.

=== Playoff stage ===
Quarterfinals
1	Universidad Católica	4	1	5
8	Colo-Colo	2	1	3
3	Unión Española	0	0	0
6	Unión La Calera	1	0	1
2	Universidad de Chile	2	1	3
7	Unión San Felipe	1	1	2
4	Palestino	1	0	1
5	O'Higgins	1	3	4

Semifinals
1	Universidad Católica	1	1	2
6	Unión La Calera	2	0	2
2	Universidad de Chile	1	7	5
5	O'Higgins	0	1	1

Finals
1	Universidad Católica	2	1	3
2	Universidad de Chile	0	4	4

==== Quarterfinals ====
In the quarterfinals, the 1 seed play the 8 seed, the 2 seed play the 7 seed, the 3 seed play the 6 seed, and the 4 seed play the 5 seed.

26 May 2011	Colo-Colo	2–4	Universidad Católica	Estadio Monumental David Arellano, Santiago
20:00 UTC−04:00	Paredes 5', 13'	Report	Mirosevic 34' (pen.); Gutiérrez 61'; Pratto 88', 90'	Attendance: 25,285; Referee: Claudio Puga

29 May 2011	Universidad Católica	1–1	Colo-Colo	Estadio Nacional Julio Martínez Prádanos, Santiago
16:00 UTC−04:00	Silva 77'	Report	Rubio 71'	Attendance: 15,603; Referee: Enrique Osses

May 25, 2011	Unión San Felipe	1–2	Universidad de Chile	Estadio Santa Laura-Universidad SEK, Santiago
18:00 UTC−04:00	Urbano 26'	Report	Canales 48' (pen.); Acevedo 58'	Attendance: 7,000; Referee: Julio Bascuñán

May 28, 2011	Universidad de Chile	1–1	Unión San Felipe	Estadio Nacional Julio Martínez Prádanos, Santiago
18:00 UTC−04:00	Vargas 6'	Report	Trecco 64'	Attendance: 15,322; Referee: Eduardo Gamboa

26 May 2011	Unión La Calera	1–0	Unión Española	Estadio Municipal Nicolás Chahuán Nazar, La Calera
16:00 UTC−04:00	Carreño 68'	Report		Attendance: 2,459; Referee: Enrique Osses

29 May 2011	Unión Española	0–0	Unión La Calera	Estadio Santa Laura-Universidad SEK, Santiago
18:00 UTC−04:00		Report		Attendance: 4,842; Referee: Claudio Puga

25 May 2011	O'Higgins	1–1	Palestino	Estadio El Teniente, Rancagua
20:00 UTC−04:00	Riquelme 33' (o.g.)	Report	Oyarzún 90+2'	Attendance: 6,006; Referee: Patricio Polic

28 May 2011	Palestino	0–3	O'Higgins	Estadio Municipal de La Cisterna, Santiago
15:30 UTC−04:00		Report	Suárez 45+2' (pen.); González 62'; Gutiérrez 76'	Attendance: 3,000; Referee: Eduardo Ponce

==== Semifinals ====
In the semifinals, the highest seed play the lowest seed, and the second-highest seed play the second-lowest seed.

2 June 2011	Unión La Calera	2–1	Universidad Católica	Estadio Municipal Nicolás Chahuán Nazar, La Calera
16:00 UTC−04:00	Bahamondes 25'; Barriga 27'	Report	Mirošević 35'	Attendance: 2,663; Referee: Eduardo Gamboa

5 June 2011	Universidad Católica	1–0	Unión La Calera	Estadio San Carlos de Apoquindo, Santiago
17:00 UTC−04:00	Andía 46'	Report		Attendance: 13,200; Referee: Claudio Puga

1 June 2011	O'Higgins	0–1	Universidad de Chile	Estadio El Teniente, Rancagua
18:00 UTC−04:00		Report	Rivarola 67'	Attendance: 11,184; Referee: Claudio Puga

4 June 2011	Universidad de Chile	7–1	O'Higgins	Estadio Nacional Julio Martínez Prádanos, Santiago
17:00 UTC−04:00	Vargas 9'; Aránguiz 13'; Canales 24', 85'; Acevedo 33'; Díaz 67'; Rivarola 81'	Report	Gutiérrez 8'	Attendance: 24,863; Referee: Patricio Polic

==== Finals ====
9 June 2011
20:00 UTC−04:00

Universidad de Chile	0–2	Universidad Católica
	Report	Costa 58'; Mirosevic 90'

Estadio Nacional Julio Martínez Prádanos, Santiago
Attendance: 30,248
Referee: Claudio Puga
12 June 2011
17:00 UTC−04:00

Universidad Católica	1–4	Universidad de Chile
Pratto 23'	Report	Canales 16' (pen.), 51' (pen.), 55'; Eluchans 25' (o.g.)

Estadio Nacional Julio Martínez Prádanos, Santiago
Attendance: 39,685
Referee: Enrique Osses

Apertura 2011 Champions:

14th title

=== Top goalscorers ===
As of 12 June 2011.

Rank	Player	Club	Goals
1	(Argentina) Matías Urbano	Unión San Felipe	12
2	(Chile) Gustavo Canales	Universidad de Chile	11
3	(Chile) Eduardo Vargas	Universidad de Chile	10
4	(Chile) Edson Puch	Universidad de Chile	9
5	(Chile) Nicolás Canales	Palestino	8
5	(Chile) Carlos Muñoz	Santiago Wanderers	8
5	(Argentina) Sebastián Jaime	Unión Española	8

=== Copa Sudamericana playoff ===
Universidad de Chile (regular season second-placed team) played a two-legged tie against Deportes Concepción (2010 Copa Chile Bicentenario runner-up) for the 2011 Copa Sudamericana preliminary stages qualification as Chile 3 berth.

Pos	Team	Pld	W	D	L	GF	GA	GD	Pts	Qualification
1	Universidad de Chile	2	1	1	0	4	2	+2	4	2011 Copa Sudamericana First Stage
2	Deportes Concepción	2	0	1	1	2	4	−2	1	

Rules for classification: 1st points; 2nd goal difference; 3rd penalty shoot-out.

27 July 2011	Deportes Concepción	2–2	Universidad de Chile	Estadio Municipal de Concepción, Concepción
19:00 UTC−04:00	Herrera 52', 59'	Report	Vargas 74'; Castro 83'	Attendance: 11,000; Referee: Julio Bascuñán

3 August 2011	Universidad de Chile	2–0	Deportes Concepción	Estadio Nacional, Santiago
19:00 UTC−04:00	Canales 56'; Rivarola 90+1'	Report		Attendance: 15,000; Referee: Eduardo Gamboa

== Torneo Clausura ==
The Torneo Clausura is scheduled to begin on July 29 and end on December 17.

=== Classification stage ===
==== Standings ====
Pos	Team	Pld	W	D	L	GF	GA	GD	Pts	Qualification
1	Universidad de Chile	17	11	6	0	39	15	+24	39	Playoffs & 2012 Copa Sudamericana Round of 16 (Note: Since Universidad de Chile won the 2011 Copa Sudamericana, they qualified for the 2012 Copa Sudamericana as the defending champions. Therefore, Cobreloa took their place and also qualified for the 2012 Copa Sudamericana.)
2	Cobreloa	17	9	4	4	27	17	+10	31	Playoffs & 2012 Copa Sudamericana First Stage
3	Colo-Colo	17	9	3	5	27	28	−1	30	Playoffs
4	Audax Italiano	17	8	5	4	29	23	+6	29	Playoffs
5	Universidad Católica	17	8	4	5	29	18	+11	28	Playoffs & 2012 Copa Sudamericana First Stage (Note: Universidad Católica qualified for the 2012 Copa Sudamericana after winning the 2011 Copa Chile.)
6	La Serena	17	8	4	5	26	23	+3	28	Playoffs
7	Unión La Calera	17	7	3	7	20	18	+2	24	Playoffs
8	Unión Española	17	6	5	6	31	23	+8	23	Playoffs
9	Cobresal	17	6	5	6	22	29	−7	23	
10	Santiago Wanderers	17	5	5	7	19	22	−3	20	
11	Iquique	17	5	5	7	30	41	−11	20	
12	Santiago Morning	17	6	1	10	29	34	−5	19	
13	Ñublense	17	6	1	10	22	32	−10	19	
14	Universidad de Concepción	17	4	7	6	20	21	−1	19	
15	Palestino	17	4	7	6	19	24	−5	19	
16	O'Higgins	17	4	5	8	23	26	−3	17	
17	Huachipato	17	4	5	8	25	30	−5	17	
18	Unión San Felipe	17	2	7	8	16	29	−13	13	

Updated to match(es) played on 28 November 2011. Source: Asociación Nacional de Fútbol Profesional
Rules for classification: 1st points; 2nd wins; 3rd goal difference; 4th goals scored; 5th away goals; 6th red cards; 7th yellow cards; 8th draw

==== Results ====
Home \ Away	AUD	CLA	CSL	COL	IQU	SER	HUA	ÑUB	O'HI	PAL	SAM	SAW	UNI	ULC	USF	UCA	UCH	UCO
Audax Italiano					3–0	2–1	1–1	2–0			5–0			2–1		0–0	1–1	2–1
Cobreloa	3–4			0–1			1–0	2–0			2–1	1–0	0–0			2–0		1–1
Cobresal	3–2	0–3		0–2	3–3	2–1			1–0			3–2	2–2			2–2		
Colo-Colo	3–0							2–1		3–1	3–1	3–1	3–2		2–2		2–2	
Iquique		2–4		1–1		1–1	3–2		3–2	1–3	4–2		1–5					
La Serena		2–1		4–0			1–0	3–1					3–2	0–0	2–1			2–0
Huachipato			1–0	1–2						0–1	1–3		2–1	1–0	2–2	1–1		
Ñublense			0–2		1–2		2–4			3–1				1–3		2–0	1–4	2–1
O'Higgins	0–1	2–2		2–0		1–1	4–4	1–1			2–1				3–0			3–0
Palestino	0–0	0–2	2–1			1–1			2–2		2–4	1–1			1–0		1–1	
Santiago Morning			5–0			4–1		1–3				3–0			1–1	3–2	0–2	0–3
Santiago Wanderers	2–0				2–2	0–2	2–1	0–1	1–0				1–1			2–0	1–1	
Unión Española	5–2							3–1	3–1	0–0	1–0				3–0	1–2	0–1	
Unión La Calera		0–1	0–1	3–0	1–2				1–0	3–2	2–0	1–0	2–0					
Unión San Felipe	2–2	1–1	1–1		2–1			1–2				0–2		1–1			0–3	
Universidad Católica				4–0	4–1	4–1			2–0	2–1				4–0	0–1			2–1
Universidad de Chile		3–1	3–1		2–2	3–0	5–3		3–0					3–2		0–0		2–0
Universidad de Concepción			0–0	3–0	3–1		1–1			0–0		2–2	2–2	0–0	2–1			

Updated to match(es) played on 28 November 2011. Source: Asociación Nacional de Fútbol Profesional
Legend: Blue = home team win; Yellow = draw; Red = away team win.

=== Playoff stage ===
For all ties, the lower-seeded team play the first leg at home.

Quarterfinals
1	Universidad de Chile	1	3	4
8	Unión Española	0	0	0
4	Audax Italiano	1	0	1
5	Universidad Católica	3	1	4
3	Colo-Colo	6	3	9
6	La Serena	2	1	3
2	Cobreloa	1	4	5
7	Unión La Calera	0	3	3

Semifinals
1	Universidad de Chile	2	1	3
5	Universidad Católica	1	2	3
3	Colo-Colo	2	2	4
2	Cobreloa	3	1	4

Finals
1	Universidad de Chile	0	3	3
2	Cobreloa	0	0	0

Updated as of games played on December 22, 2011.

==== Quarterfinals ====
In the quarterfinals, the 1 seed play the 8 seed, the 2 seed play the 7 seed, the 3 seed play the 6 seed, and the 4 seed play the 5 seed.

===== Quarterfinals A =====
Pos	Team	Pld	W	D	L	GF	GA	GD	Pts	Qualification
1	Universidad de Chile	2	2	0	0	4	0	+4	6	Advanced to the Semifinals
2	Unión Española	2	0	0	2	0	4	−4	0	

Rules for classification: 1st points; 2nd goal difference; 3rd classification phase position.
December 4, 2011
18:30 UTC−03:00

Unión Española	0–1	Universidad de Chile
	Report	G. Vargas 90+2'

Estadio Santa Laura-Universidad SEK, Santiago
Attendance: 3.671
Referee: Julio Bascuñán

December 11, 2011
18:15 UTC−03:00

Universidad de Chile	3–0	Unión Española
G. Vargas 31', 42'; Rivarola 75'	Report

Estadio Nacional Julio Martínez Prádanos, Santiago
Attendance: 12.353
Referee: Patricio Polic

===== Quarterfinals B =====
Pos	Team	Pld	W	D	L	GF	GA	GD	Pts	Qualification
1	Universidad Católica	2	2	0	0	4	1	+3	6	Advanced to the Semifinals
2	Audax Italiano	2	0	0	2	1	4	−3	0	

Rules for classification: 1st points; 2nd goal difference; 3rd classification phase position.
December 3, 2011
19:00 UTC−03:00

Universidad Católica	3–1	Audax Italiano
Martínez 27'; Mirosevic 40'; Calandria 90+2'	Report	Silva 65'

Estadio San Carlos de Apoquindo, Santiago
Attendance: 9.817
Referee: Jorge Osorio

December 10, 2011
20:30 UTC−03:00

Audax Italiano	0–1	Universidad Católica
	Report	Pizarro 5'

Estadio Bicentenario de La Florida, Santiago
Attendance: 8.622
Referee: Julio Bascuñán

===== Quarterfinals C =====
Pos	Team	Pld	W	D	L	GF	GA	GD	Pts	Qualification
1	Cobreloa	2	2	0	0	5	3	+2	6	Advanced to the Semifinals
2	Unión La Calera	2	0	0	2	3	5	−2	0	

Rules for classification: 1st points; 2nd goal difference; 3rd classification phase position.
December 4, 2011
16:00 UTC−03:00

Unión La Calera	0–1	Cobreloa
	Report	Cortés 30'

Estadio Municipal Nicolás Chahuán, La Calera
Attendance: 3.755
Referee: Claudio Fuenzalida

December 11, 2011
16:00 UTC−03:00

Cobreloa	4–3	Unión La Calera
Vera 14'; Elizondo 80', 90+3'; Barrios 90'	Report	Rodríguez 17'; Simón 26'; Suárez 57' (o.g.)

Estadio Municipal de Calama, Calama
Attendance: 3.845
Referee: Claudio Puga

===== Quarterfinals D =====
Pos	Team	Pld	W	D	L	GF	GA	GD	Pts	Qualification
1	Colo-Colo	2	2	0	0	9	3	+6	6	Advanced to the Semifinals
2	La Serena	2	0	0	2	3	9	−6	0	

Rules for classification: 1st points; 2nd goal difference; 3rd classification phase position.
December 3, 2011
16:30 UTC−03:00

La Serena	2–6	Colo-Colo
García 2'; Pezzarossi 25'	Report	Paredes 11', 57'; Wílchez 18', 27'; Gutiérrez 72'; Muñoz 90'

Estadio La Portada, La Serena
Attendance: 8.355
Referee: Manuel Acosta

December 10, 2011
18:15 UTC−03:00

Colo-Colo	3–1	La Serena
Gutiérrez 26', 76'; Muñoz 90'	Report	Pezzarossi 36'

Estadio Monumental, Santiago
Attendance: 24.209
Referee: Carlos Ulloa

==== Semifinals ====
In the semifinals, the highest seed play the lowest seed, and the second-highest seed play the second-lowest seed.

===== Semifinals A =====
Pos	Team	Pld	W	D	L	GF	GA	GD	Pts	Qualification
1	Universidad de Chile	2	1	0	1	3	3	0	3	Advanced to the Final
2	Universidad Católica	2	1	0	1	3	3	0	3	

Rules for classification: 1st points; 2nd goal difference; 3rd classification phase position.
December 18, 2011
12:00 UTC−03:00

Universidad Católica	1–2	Universidad de Chile
Harbottle 20'	Report	Aránguiz 41'; Mena 71'

Estadio San Carlos de Apoquindo, Santiago
Attendance: 11.638
Referee: Eduardo Gamboa

December 22, 2011
19:00 UTC−03:00

Universidad de Chile	1–2	Universidad Católica
O. González 59'	Report	Harbottle 42'; Villanueva 90'

Estadio Nacional Julio Martínez Prádanos, Santiago
Attendance: 20.830
Referee: Patricio Polic

===== Semifinals B =====
Pos	Team	Pld	W	D	L	GF	GA	GD	Pts	Qualification
1	Cobreloa	2	1	0	1	4	4	0	3	Advanced to the Final
2	Colo-Colo	2	1	0	1	4	4	0	3	

Rules for classification: 1st points; 2nd goal difference; 3rd classification phase position.
December 17, 2011
19:00 UTC−03:00

Colo-Colo	2–3	Cobreloa
Fuenzalida 18'; Paredes 88'	Report	Elizondo 21'; Rocco 60'; Trecco 90+3'

Estadio Monumental, Santiago
Attendance: 36.623
Referee: Jorge Osorio

December 20, 2011
18:00 UTC−03:00

Cobreloa	1–2	Colo-Colo
Barrios 80'	Report	Muñoz 14'; Paredes 24'

Estadio Municipal de Calama, Calama
Attendance: 9.837
Referee: Eduardo Gamboa

==== Finals ====
Pos	Team	Pld	W	D	L	GF	GA	GD	Pts	Qualification
1	Universidad de Chile	2	1	1	0	3	0	+3	4	2012 Copa Libertadores Second Stage
2	Cobreloa	2	0	1	1	0	3	−3	1	

Rules for classification: 1st points; 2nd goal difference; 3rd classification phase position.
December 26, 2011
16:00 UTC−03:00

Cobreloa	0–0	Universidad de Chile
	Report

Estadio Municipal de Calama, Calama
Attendance: 10,268
Referee: Eduardo Gamboa

December 29, 2011
20:00 UTC−03:00

Universidad de Chile	3–0	Cobreloa
Canales 24'; Vargas 28'; Rodríguez 35'	Report

Estadio Nacional Julio Martínez Prádanos, Santiago
Attendance: 44,870
Referee: Enrique Osses

=== Top goalscorers ===
Rank	Name	Player nationality	Club	Goals
1	Esteban Paredes	Chilean	Colo-Colo	14
2	Sebastián Pinto	Chilean	O'Higgins	13
3	Facundo Pereyra	Argentine	Audax Italiano	11
4	Nicolás Canales	Chilean	Palestino	9
4	Miguel Angel Cuellar	Paraguayan	Cobresal	9
4	Diego Barrios	Paraguayan	Cobreloa	9
6	Francisco Castro	Chilean	Universidad de Chile	8
6	Leonardo Monje	Chilean	Unión Española	8
6	Cristian Bogado	Paraguayan	Iquique	8
6	Lucas Simón	Argentine	Unión La Calera	8

== Aggregate table ==
Pos	Team	Pld	W	D	L	GF	GA	GD	Pts	Qualification or relegation
1	Universidad de Chile	34	21	11	2	78	35	+43	74	2012 Copa Libertadores Second Stage (Note: Universidad de Chile is qualified for the second stage of the 2012 Copa Libertadores as the Torneo Apertura. Since they later also won the Torneo Clausura, Universidad Católica also qualified for the second stage as the best-placed non-champion, and Unión Española qualified for the first stage as the second best-placed non-champion.)
2	Universidad Católica	34	19	9	6	63	36	+27	66	2012 Copa Libertadores Second Stage
3	Unión Española	34	15	10	9	64	41	+23	55	2012 Copa Libertadores First Stage
4	Colo-Colo	34	16	6	12	55	54	+1	54	
5	Audax Italiano	34	14	8	12	53	51	+2	50	
6	Unión La Calera	34	14	7	13	38	36	+2	49	
7	Cobreloa	34	13	10	11	43	39	+4	49	
8	La Serena	34	13	10	11	54	51	+3	49	
9	Palestino	34	13	10	11	45	44	+1	49	
10	O'Higgins	34	12	8	14	52	52	0	44	
11	Iquique	34	10	11	13	48	63	−15	41	
12	Cobresal	34	11	6	17	48	70	−22	39	
13	Universidad de Concepción	34	10	9	15	44	47	−3	39	
14	Huachipato	34	10	9	15	49	57	−8	39	
15	Santiago Wanderers	34	10	9	15	42	53	−11	39	Relegation/Promotion Playoffs
16	Unión San Felipe	34	9	10	15	40	50	−10	37	Relegation/Promotion Playoffs
17	Santiago Morning	34	9	8	17	51	55	−4	35	Relegated to the Primera División B
18	Ñublense	34	10	3	21	39	63	−24	33	Relegated to the Primera División B

Source: Asociación Nacional de Fútbol Profesional
Rules for classification: Rules for classification: 1st points; 2nd wins; 3rd goal difference; 4th goals scored; 5th away goals; 6th red cards; 7th yellow cards; 8th draw.

=== Relegation/promotion playoffs ===
Teams			Scores		Tie-breakers	
Team #1	Points	Team #2	1st leg	2nd leg	GD	Pen.
Santiago Wanderers	4:1	Naval	1–0	2–2	—	—
Unión San Felipe	3:3	Everton	0–1	2–0	+1:–1	—

== Attendance ==
These are the attendance records of each of the teams.

Team	Apertura Classification	Apertura w/ Playoffs	As of October	Total
Universidad de Chile	15,748	18,066	14,980	16,919
Colo Colo	11,620	13,138	13,453	16,460
Universidad Católica	7,643	11,206	9,304	9,082
Santiago Wanderers	5,874	DNQ	4,933	5,475
Iquique	6,155	DNQ	5,178	5,324
Cobreloa	4,964	DNQ	4,722	4,952
O'Higgins	5,483	6,099	5,242	4,934
Ñublense	4,364	DNQ	4,203	4,387
Audax Italiano	3,160	DNQ	3,386	3,776
Huachipato	3,482	DNQ	3,528	3,473
Universidad de Concepción	3,953	DNQ	3,417	3,465
La Serena	2,734	DNQ	2,918	3,366
Unión La Calera	3,557	3,357	2,948	3,023
Unión San Felipe	2,521	2,906	2,317	3,014
Unión Española	2,644	2,863	2,745	3,010
Palestino	1,987	2,210	2,146	2,146
Cobresal	1,133	DNQ	1,315	1,350
Santiago Morning	1,176	DNQ	1,136	1,128

DNQ: Did not qualify
