= 2013 Campeonato Nacional Primera División =

Campeonato Nacional Petrobras
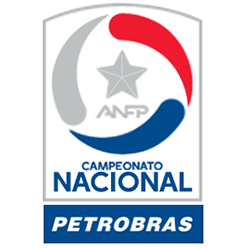
- Season: 2013 (Transición)
- Champions: Unión Española
- Relegated: San Marcos
- 2014 Copa Libertadores: Unión Española
- 2013 Copa Sudamericana: Universidad Católica; Cobreloa
- Matches: 153
- Goals: 427 (2.79 per match)
- Top goalscorer: Javier Elizondo; Sebastián Sáez (14 goals)
- Biggest home win: Universidad de Chile 6-1 San Marcos
- Biggest away win: San Marcos 0-4 Ñublense
- Highest scoring: Cobreloa 5-2 Colo-Colo; Santiago Wanderers 3-4 Unión La Calera; Huachipato 3-4 Universidad de Chile; Rangers 5-2 Huachipato
- Highest attendance: 41,527; Universidad de Chile 3-2 Colo-Colo (May 5th)
- Total attendance: 790,243
- Average attendance: 5,164

The 2013 Primera División del Fútbol Profesional Chileno season (known as the 2013 Torneo Transición Petrobras for sponsorship reasons) was the 82nd season of top-flight football in Chile. Huachipato was the defending champion.

== Format changes ==
Starting in 2013, the ANFP's Council of Club Presidents approved a change from a season contained entirely within a calendar year to a season that spans two calendar years. To manage this transition, the 2013 season was held with only a single championship instead of the traditional Apertura and Clausura format. The Apertura and Clausura format returned for the 2013–14 season, but without the playoff rounds conducted in the past.

== Teams ==
Eighteen teams will be competing in the Primera División for the 2013 season, fifteen of whom are returning from the 2012 season. Universidad de Concepción, Unión San Felipe and La Serena were relegated last season after finishing 15th, 17th and 18th overall, respectively. They were replaced by San Marcos, Ñublense and Everton, the 2012 Primera B winner, runner-up and fourth place, respectively.

Team	City	Stadium	Current manager
Antofagasta	Antofagasta	Regional de Antofagasta	Gustavo Huerta
Audax Italiano	Santiago	Municipal de La Florida	Pablo Marini
Cobreloa	Calama	Municipal de Calama	Marco Antonio Figueroa
Cobresal	El Salvador	El Cobre	José Cantillana
Colo-Colo	Santiago	Monumental David Arellano	Hugo González
Everton	Viña del Mar	Sausalito	Víctor Hugo Castañeda
Huachipato	Talcahuano	CAP	Jorge Pellicer
Iquique	Iquique	Tierra de Campeones	Jaime Vera
Ñublense	Chillán	Municipal Nelson Oyarzún Arenas	Carlos Rojas
O'Higgins	Rancagua	El Teniente	Eduardo Berizzo
Palestino	Santiago	Municipal de La Cisterna	Emiliano Astorga
Rangers	Talca	Fiscal de Talca	Dalcio Giovagnoli
San Marcos	Arica	Carlos Dittborn	Luis Marcoleta
Santiago Wanderers	Valparaíso	Regional Chiledeportes	Ivo Basay
Unión Española	Santiago	Santa Laura	José Luis Sierra
Unión La Calera	La Calera	Municipal Nicolás Chahuán	Néstor Craviotto
Universidad Católica	Santiago	San Carlos de Apoquindo	Martín Lasarte
Universidad de Chile	Santiago	Estadio Nacional Julio Martínez Prádanos	Darío Franco

== Torneo de Transición ==
The Torneo de Transición began in January and ended in May.

=== Classification stage ===
The Classification Stage began in January and ended in May.

==== Standings ====
Pos	Team	Pld	W	D	L	GF	GA	GD	Pts	Qualification
1	Unión Española	17	12	2	3	32	12	+20	38	2014 Copa Libertadores group stage
2	Universidad Católica	17	12	2	3	36	19	+17	38	2013 Copa Sudamericana first stage
3	Cobreloa	17	9	7	1	33	18	+15	34	2013 Copa Sudamericana first stage
4	O'Higgins	17	9	4	4	28	19	+9	31	
5	Universidad de Chile	17	9	3	5	37	29	+8	30	2013 Copa Sudamericana first stage (Note: Universidad de Chile qualified for the 2013 Copa Sudamericana by winning the 2012–13 Copa Chile.)
6	Everton	17	8	3	6	25	24	+1	27	
7	Unión La Calera	17	8	2	7	25	26	−1	26	
8	Rangers	17	6	6	5	25	22	+3	24	
9	Santiago Wanderers	17	7	2	8	22	28	−6	23	
10	Colo-Colo	17	6	3	8	26	27	−1	21	
11	Palestino	17	5	5	7	20	23	−3	20	
12	Ñublense	17	5	5	7	20	26	−6	20	
13	Deportes Antofagasta	17	5	4	8	31	34	−3	19	
14	Audax Italiano	17	5	4	8	24	29	−5	19	
15	Huachipato	17	5	4	8	24	31	−7	19	
16	Deportes Iquique	17	3	4	10	14	25	−11	13	
17	San Marcos	17	2	6	9	19	34	−15	12	
18	Cobresal	17	3	2	12	22	37	−15	11	

Source: Asociación Nacional de Fútbol Profesional
Rules for classification: 1st points; 2nd wins; 3rd goal difference; 4th goals scored; 5th away goals; 6th red cards; 7th yellow cards; 8th draw.
Notes:

Campeonato Nacional
2013 champions

7th title

==== Results ====
Home \ Away	ANT	AUD	CLA	CSL	COL	EVE	IQU	HUA	ÑUB	O'HI	PAL	RAN	SMA	SAW	UNI	ULC	UCA	UCH
Antofagasta		1–0	0–0			1–2		3–3		1–3	1–2		3–1					4–2
Audax Italiano				3–2	3–1	1–3	3–1	0–1			1–0		1–1				1–2	
Cobreloa		1–1			5–2		4–1	3–3	0–2		1–0		2–1	2–0			4–2	
Cobresal	3–2		1–4			0–1						2–2		1–2	1–2	2–1	1–2	1–3
Colo-Colo	3–3			2–0		3–0		2–2	1–1	1–2				1–0		2–0	0–1	
Everton			0–1				2–1	3–0		2–0		2–1		3–0		2–3		1–1
Iquique	1–1			3–0	2–1				0–1	2–1	0–0	0–2		0–2				
Huachipato				0–2			2–1			0–2	0–2		0–0	3–1	0–1		1–2	3–4
Ñublense	0–2	2–4		2–1		1–1		0–3		1–1						0–2	1–3	1–3
O'Higgins		3–1	1–1	2–2							3–2		2–1	2–0		0–1	0–1	2–2
Palestino				3–2	1–2	2–1			0–1			2–2	2–2		1–2	1–0		
Rangers	4–1	1–1	2–2		1–0			5–2	0–0	1–2				0–0			0–3	
San Marcos				3–1	2–3	2–2	1–1		0–4			1–0			0–1	1–1	1–2	
Santiago Wanderers	1–4	2–1							3–1		0–0		3–1		0–2	3–4		
Unión Española	3–1	4–0	0–0		1–0	5–0	1–0		2–2	0–2		1–2						
Unión La Calera	2–1	3–3	1–2				1–0	0–1				2–0			2–1			2–3
Universidad Católica	4–2					2–0	1–1				1–1			2–3	1–3	4–0		3–0
Universidad de Chile		1–0	1–1		3–2		2–0				4–1	1–2	6–1		0–3			

Updated to match(es) played on 26 May 2013. Source: Soccerway.com
Legend: Blue = home team win; Yellow = draw; Red = away team win.

=== Top goalscorers ===
As of 26 May 2013.

Rank	Player	Club	Goals
1	(Argentina) Javier Elizondo	Deportes Antofagasta	14
1	(Argentina) Sebastián Sáez	Audax Italiano	14
3	(Argentina) Sebastián Pol	Cobreloa	11
4	(Chile) Carlos Muñoz	Colo-Colo	9
5	(Chile) Isaac Díaz	Universidad de Chile	8
6	(Chile) Patricio Rubio	Unión Española	8
7	(Argentina) Ismael Sosa	Universidad Católica	8

== Relegation ==
Pos	Team	2010 Pts	2011 Pts	2012 Pts	2013 Pts	Total Pts	Total Pld	Avg	Relegation
1	Universidad de Chile	64	74	73	30	241	119	2.025	
2	Universidad Católica	74	66	53	35	231	119	1.941	
3	Colo-Colo	71	54	59	21	205	119	1.723	
4	Unión Española	52	55	51	35	196	119	1.647	
5	Everton	—	—	—	27	27	17	1.588	
6	Audax Italiano	65	50	43	19	177	119	1.487	
7	O'Higgins	41	44	55	31	171	119	1.437	
8	Rangers	—	—	48	24	72	51	1.412	
9	Iquique	—	41	65	13	119	85	1.4	
10	Cobreloa	39	49	43	34	165	119	1.387	
11	Unión La Calera	—	49	39	26	114	85	1.341	
12	Palestino	42	49	48	20	159	119	1.336	
13	Huachipato	48	39	48	19	154	119	1.294	
14	Santiago Wanderers	45	39	39	23	146	119	1.227	
15	Ñublense	40	—	—	20	60	51	1.176	
16	Antofagasta	—	—	37	19	56	51	1.098	
17	Cobresal	42	39	35	11	127	119	1.067	Relegation Playoff Matches
18	San Marcos	—	—	—	12	12	17	0.706	2013–14 Primera División B

=== Relegation/promotion playoffs ===
Teams			Scores		Tie-breakers	
Team #1	Points	Team #2	1st leg	2nd leg	GD	Pen.
Cobresal	4:1	Curicó Unido	0–0	3–0	—	—

29 May 2013 Leg 1	Curicó Unido	0–0	Cobresal	Estadio La Granja, Curicó
20:00		Report		Attendance: 3,110; Referee: Julio Bascuñán

2 June 2013 Leg 2	Cobresal	3–0	Curicó Unido	Estadio El Cobre, El Salvador
15:30	Pineda 39'; Cantero 46'; Parodi 67'	Report		Attendance: 2,663; Referee: Eduardo Gamboa
