= Cristopher Toselli =

Chilean footballer (born 1988)

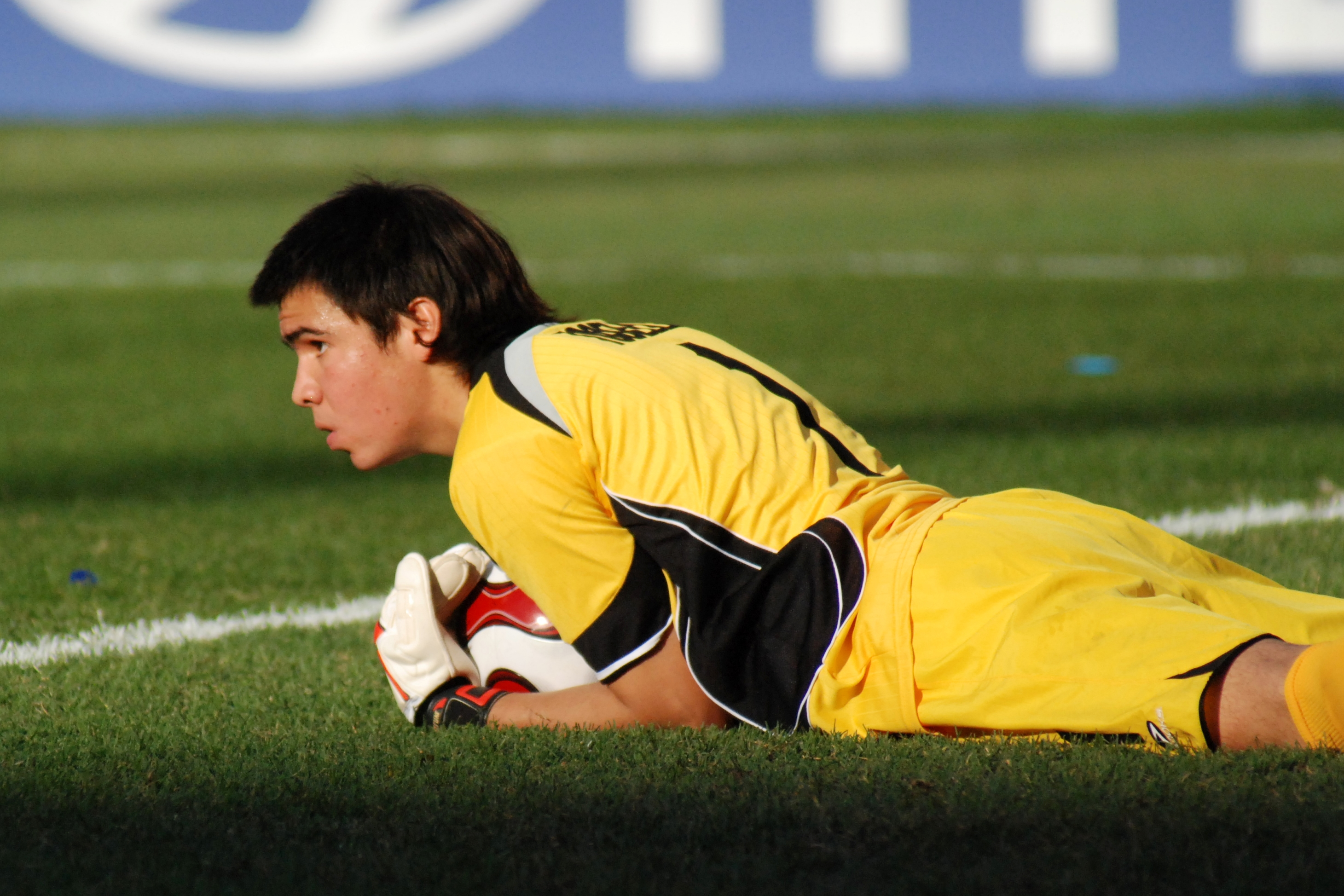
- Toselli playing for Chile U20 in 2007

Personal information
- Full name: Cristopher Benjamín Toselli Ríos
- Date of birth: 15 June 1988 (age 38)
- Place of birth: Antofagasta, Chile
- Height: 1.83 m (6 ft 0 in)
- Position: Goalkeeper

Team information
- Current team: Universidad de Chile
- Number: 1

Youth career
- 2001–2008: Universidad Católica

Senior career*
Years	Team	Apps	(Gls)
2007–2022	Universidad Católica	233	(0)
2018	→ Atlas (loan)	7	(0)
2018	→ Everton (loan)	15	(0)
2021	→ Palestino (loan)	29	(0)
2022	→ Central Córdoba SdE (loan)	24	(0)
2023–	Universidad de Chile	14	(0)

International career
2005	Chile U17	4	(0)
2007	Chile U20	14	(0)
2008–2010	Chile U23	14	(0)
2010–2018	Chile	9	(0)
Medal record
Representing Chile
Third place	FIFA U-20 World Cup	2007
Winner	Copa América Centenario	2016
Runner-up	FIFA Confederations Cup	2017
- * Club domestic league appearances and goals as of 8 December 2025

Cristopher Benjamín Toselli Ríos (Spanish pronunciation: [ˈkɾistofeɾ toˈseli], born 15 June 1988) is a Chilean footballer who plays as a goalkeeper for Universidad de Chile.

Toselli is best known for beating Cláudio Taffarel's clean sheet record of 484 minutes during 2007 FIFA U-20 World Cup of Canada, surpassing him by eight minutes and completing 492 minutes in total, helping Chilean youth squad to a third-place finish. In 2009, he was a member of Ivo Basay's 23-man squad who won the Toulon Tournament, a tournament that Cristopher lost in 2008 against Italy under Marcelo Bielsa as coach.

== Club career ==
=== Universidad Católica ===
==== Early career ====
Born in Antofagasta, Toselli joined the Universidad Católica youth ranks in 2001. He was promoted to the first team by coach Jorge Pellicer in 2006 for the Torneo Apertura, following the departure of second-choice keeper Rainer Wirth to Deportes Temuco. The following year, after a notable performance in the FIFA U-20 World Cup, he made his club debut on 25 November, in a 3–0 home win over Coquimbo Unido at San Carlos. The next season, he competed for the starting goalkeeper position with veteran José María Buljubasich, becoming the first-choice keeper after Buljubasich's mistakes and his subsequent departure for Olimpia.

In 2009, he participated in the Toulon Tournament final against France, which Chile won 1–0. Toselli suffered a bad injury that side-lined him for six months. This angered Universidad Católica's coach, Marco Antonio Figueroa, who had risked playing him and lost his first-choice keeper as a result. During his recovery time, second-choice keeper Paulo Garcés broke into the first team, relegating Toselli to the bench.

==== 2010 season ====
On 5 December 2010, Toselli played in the Primera División final match against Everton, where his club was crowned champion after defeating the Viña del Mar-based team 5–0 at home.

==== 2011 season ====
On 11 May 2011, he regained the starting position under orders of Juan Antonio Pizzi, after a terrible mistake of Garcés in a Copa Libertadores quarterfinals match against Peñarol at Montevideo. In this match, Garcés inexplicably dropped the ball and Peñarol's Alejandro Martinuccio took the opportunity to score, sealing the victory with a score of 2–0, in the 90th minute. After losing the playoff final of the Torneo Apertura against Universidad de Chile, he was reinstated as the starting keeper by new coach Mario Lepe, following the departures of Pizzi and Garcés. On 16 November, Toselli won the Copa Chile final against Magallanes. This was his second title at Católica, and it qualified his team to the 2012 Copa Sudamericana, in which Los Cruzados were eliminated at the semifinal stage, against Brazilian side São Paulo after two draws, where Toselli had incredible performances.

==== Loans ====
On 15 December 2017, Toselli joined Liga MX side Atlas on loan for the remainder of the 2017–18 season. On 30 April 2018, the club announced that Toselli's loan would not be extended due to his poor performances.

On 13 July 2018, Toselli returned to Chile, joining Everton on loan as an emergency replacement for the recently departed Eduardo Lobos and the injured Franco Torgnascioli.

On 18 February 2021, Toselli joined fellow Primera División club Palestino, on a one-year loan. He also extended his contract with La Católica until the end of the 2022 season.

On 6 January 2022, Toselli joined Argentine Primera División side Central Córdoba SdE on loan, after the club lost their two keepers Andrés Mehring (ACL rupture) and César Rigamonti (three broken ribs) to injuries.

=== Universidad de Chile ===
On 9 January 2023, Toselli returned to Chile, joining Universidad de Chile on a free transfer. He left them at the end of the 2025 season, but he renewed for a season on 7 January 2026.

== International career ==
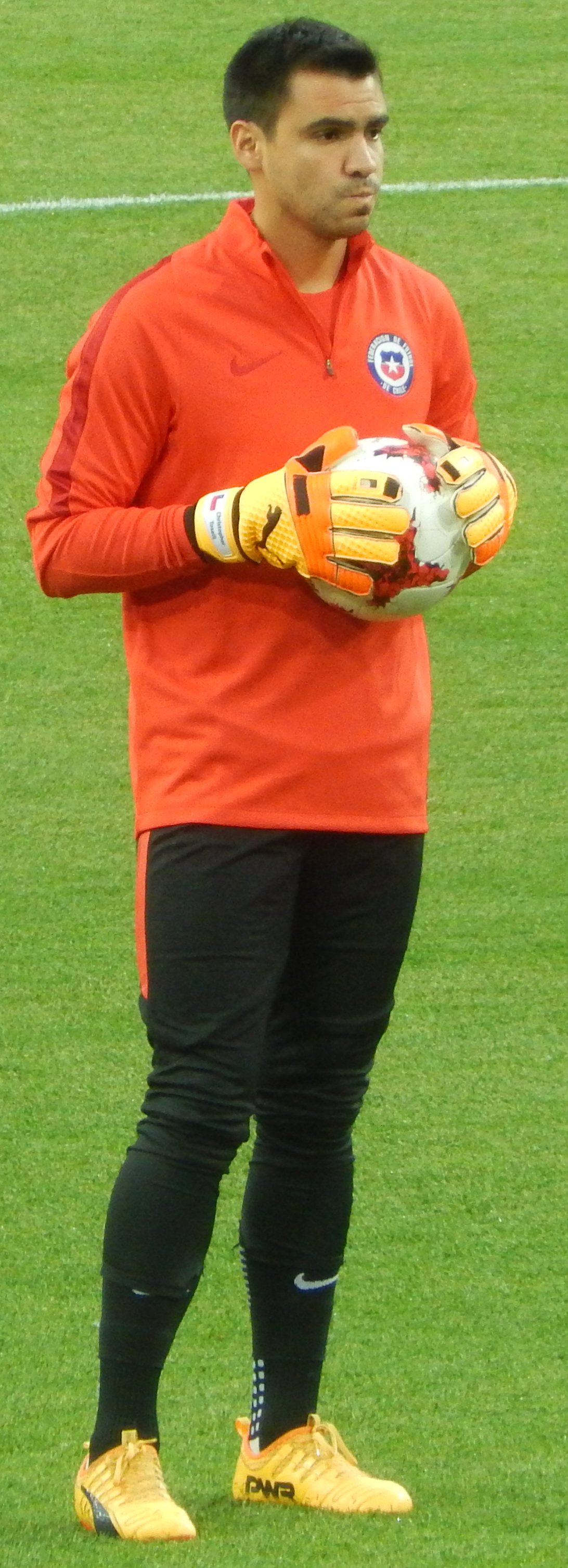
Toselli in 2017

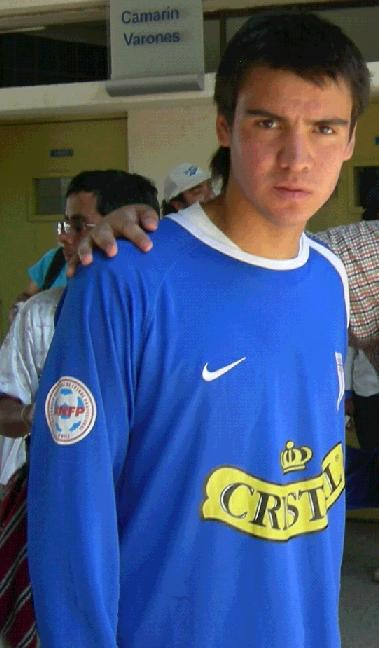
Toselli aged 19 in 2007

During his early career, Toselli represented Chile U17 at the 2005 South American U–17 Championship, playing in four matches. Later, Toselli was called up to the Chile U20 national team for the 2007 South American U-20 Championship in Paraguay. He started in the national team as second goalkeeper until the third game of tournament, in where he relegated Colo-Colo's player Richard Leyton, to the bench. Chile finished in fourth place of the final stages of the tournament tied at six points with Paraguay. However the Guaraníes had a lower goal difference than Chile, thus Chile qualified to the 2007 FIFA U–20 World Cup celebrated in Canada.

In the U–20 World Cup, Toselli's performance with Chile was outstanding, with the team finishing in third–place of the tournament, after beating Austria 1–0. In addition, he broke Brazilian goalkeeper Cláudio Taffarel's record of 484 minutes without conceding goals in a Youth World Cup, achieving 495 minutes in total.

After his U–20 World Cup performances, he was called up to the Toulon Tournament in France, for three years consecutively (2008–2010). In 2008 (U23 squad), Toselli was called up by coach Marcelo Bielsa and after another great performance, Chile finished as runner-up of the tournament, after a 1–0 defeat against Italy. In 2009 (U21 squad), he was once again called up to play the Toulon Tournament, which Chile would win beating France 1–0 with a Gerson Martínez goal at the 86th minute. In the final, he suffered a cruciate ligament rupture that sidelined him for six-months. In 2010 (U22 squad), Chile finished fourth place in the Toulon Tournament, after losing the third-place match against France.

In addition, Toselli played in a friendly match against Mexico U22 in San Luis Potosí, Mexico on 3 September 2011. The squad only included under-25 players and resulted in 3–1 win.

Toselli was called up by Bielsa to play his first senior international game for his country against Panama, match that ended in a 2–1 win. During the 2010 FIFA World Cup qualification process, he was frequently called up by Bielsa as third goalkeeper. But for the 2010 FIFA World Cup, it was Luis Marín was who called-up, with Nery Veloso as a stand in. Toselli would be called up by Bielsa's successors, Claudio Borghi and Jorge Sampaoli, during the 2014 World Cup qualifiers. He was eventually included in the 23-man squad that played the World Cup.

== Career statistics ==
=== Club ===
As of 2 October 2023

Club	Season	League			National cup		Continental		Other		Total	
Club	Season	Division	Apps	Goals	Apps	Goals	Apps	Goals	Apps	Goals	Apps	Goals
Universidad Católica	2007	Chilean Primera División	1	0	—		—		—		1	0
Universidad Católica	2008	Chilean Primera División	6	0	—		—		—		6	0
Universidad Católica	2009	Chilean Primera División	15	0	—		—		—		15	0
Universidad Católica	2010	Chilean Primera División	7	0	1	0	—		—		8	0
Universidad Católica	2011	Chilean Primera División	37	0	2	0	8 (Note: 3 appearances in the Copa Libertadores, 5 in the Copa Sudamericana)	0	—		47	0
Universidad Católica	2012	Chilean Primera División	36	0	—		16 (Note: 6 appearances in the Copa Libertadores, 10 in the Copa Sudamericana)	0	—		52	0
Universidad Católica	2013	Chilean Primera División	17	0	5	0	—		—		22	0
Universidad Católica	2013–14	Chilean Primera División	36	0	—		6 (Note: Appearance(s) in the Copa Sudamericana)	0	—		42	0
Universidad Católica	2014–15	Chilean Primera División	1	0	1	0	—		—		2	0
Universidad Católica	2015–16	Chilean Primera División	31	0	2	0	4	0	—		37	0
Universidad Católica	2016–17	Chilean Primera División	26	0	1	0	8 (Note: 6 appearances in the Copa Libertadores, 2 in the Copa Sudamericana)	0	1 (Note: Appearance(s) in the Supercopa de Chile)	0	36	0
Universidad Católica	2017	Chilean Primera División	15	0	—		—		1	0	16	0
Universidad Católica	2019	Chilean Primera División	4	0	3	0	—		—		7	0
Universidad Católica	2020	Chilean Primera División	1	0	—		—		—		1	0
Universidad Católica	Total club		233	0	15	0	42	0	2	0	292	0
Atlas (loan)	2017–18	Liga MX	7	0	1	0	—		—		8	0
Everton (loan)	2018	Chilean Primera División	15	0	—		—		—		15	0
Palestino (loan)	2021	Chilean Primera División	29	0	3	0	8	0	—		40	0
Central Córdoba (loan)	2022	Argentine Primera División	24	0	0	0	—		—		24	0
Universidad de Chile	2023	Chilean Primera División	4	0	0	0	—		—		4	0
Total carrera			312	0	19	0	50	0	2	0	383	0

=== International ===
As of 15 January 2017.

Appearances and goals by national team and year
National team	Year	Apps	Goals
Chile	2010	1	0
Chile	2012	2	0
Chile	2014	1	0
Chile	2016	3	0
Chile	2017	2	0
Total		9	0

== Honours ==
Universidad Católica

- Primera División: 2010, 2016–C, 2016–A, 2019, 2020
- Copa Chile: 2011
- Supercopa de Chile: 2016, 2019
- Friendlies: Torneo de Verano Fox Sports 2019

Chile U20

- FIFA U-20 World Cup: Third Place 2007

Chile U21

- Toulon Tournament: 2009

Chile

- Copa del Pacífico: 2012
- Copa América: 2016
- Confederations Cup: Runner-up 2017
- China Cup: 2017

Individual

- Best goalkeeper of Toulon Tournament: 2009
- Chilean Footballer of the Year: 2013
