= Diego Barrios =

Diego Barrios may refer to:

- Diego Barrios (footballer, born March 1987), Paraguayan footballer
- Diego Barrios (footballer, born July 1987), Paraguayan footballer
- Diego Barrios (Spanish footballer) (born 1994), Spanish footballer
