= Pedro Vera =

Pedro Vera may refer to:

- Pedro Jorge Vera, Ecuadorian writer and politician
- Pedro Vera (Paraguayan footballer) (born 1988), Paraguayan football midfielder
- Pedro Vera (Venezuelan footballer) (born 1958), Venezuelan football manager and former defender
- Pedro Vera, Viga, a barangay in the Philippines
