= Humberto Bustamante =

Chilean footballer (born 1990)

Personal information
- Full name: Humberto Ricardo Bustamante Cerda
- Date of birth: 19 May 1990 (age 36)
- Place of birth: Concepción, Chile
- Height: 1.89 m (6 ft 2 1/2 in)
- Position: Defender

Youth career
- Huachipato

Senior career*
Years	Team	Apps	(Gls)
2008–2013	Universidad de Concepción	2	(0)
2009–2012	→ Fernández Vial (loan)	48	(2)
2013–2014	Lota Schwager	32	(1)
2014–2016	Unión San Felipe	40	(1)
2017	Deportes Iquique	0	(0)
2017	Iberia	6	(1)
2018	Fernández Vial	13	(0)
2019–2020	Racing de Córdoba	?	(?)
2020–2021	San Antonio Unido	20	(0)
- * Club domestic league appearances and goals as of 12 February 2021

Humberto Ricardo Bustamante Cerda (born 19 May 1990) is a Chilean footballer who last played for Chilean Segunda División side San Antonio Unido as a centre back.

== Club career ==
Born in Concepción, Bustamante began his career at Huachipato lower divisions where remained until 2008. Then, he moved to Universidad de Concepción where professionally debuted the Torneo Clausura in a 1–0 home loss with Deportes Melipilla.

In 2009, he was loaned to Club Deportivo Ferroviario Almirante Arturo Fernandez Vial from the Chilean third tier. There, he remained three years playing. Then, he returned to Universidad de Concepción in 2013 where he won the second division (Primera B) title.

In mid-2013, he joined Lota Schwager and faced the 2013–14 season, where he scored one goal and registered thirty two appearances.

During the 2014 World Cup break, he signed for Unión San Felipe. He played thirty three games there, scoring one goal.

On 29 June 2016, Bustamante joined first-tier team Deportes Iquique, but he arrived injured.

== Honours ==
=== Club ===
Universidad de Concepción

- Primera B: 2013
