= 2013 in Chilean football =

Football in Chile
- Season: 2013

This article covers the 2013 football season in Chile.

== National tournaments ==
=== Primera División ===
- Transicion Champion: Unión Española
  - Topscorer: Javier Elizondo
- Apertura Champion: O'Higgins
  - Topscorer: Luciano Vázquez

=== Copa Chile ===
- Transicion Champion: Universidad de Chile
  - Topscorer: Matías Donoso

== National team results ==
The Chile national football team results and fixtures for 2013.

Win Draw Loss

=== 2014 World Cup qualifiers ===
March 22 Round 11	Peru	1–0	Chile	Lima, Peru
21:10 UTC−5	Farfán 87'	Report		Stadium: Estadio Nacional de Lima; Attendance: 45,000; Referee: Diego Abal (Argentina)

March 26 Round 12	Chile	2–0	Uruguay	Santiago, Chile
20:30 UTC−3	Paredes 10'; Vargas 77'	Report		Stadium: Estadio Nacional; Attendance: 43,816; Referee: Néstor Pitana (Argentina)

June 7 Round 13	Paraguay	1–2	Chile	Asunción, Paraguay
20:10 UTC−4	Santa Cruz 88'	Report	Vargas 41'; Vidal 56'	Stadium: Estadio Defensores del Chaco, Asunción; Attendance: 25,810; Referee: Leandro Vuaden (Brazil)

June 11 Round 14	Chile	3–1	Bolivia	Santiago, Chile
20:00 (UTC−4)	Vargas 17'; Sánchez 18'; Vidal 90+2'	Report	Moreno 26'	Stadium: Estadio Nacional; Attendance: 45,000; Referee: Darío Ubriaco (Uruguay)

September 6 Round 15	Chile	3–0	Venezuela	Santiago, Chile
20:30 (UTC−4)	Vargas 11'; González 30'; Vidal 85'	Report		Stadium: Estadio Nacional; Attendance: 46,500; Referee: Sandro Ricci (Brazil)

October 11 Round 17	Colombia	3–3	Chile	Barranquilla, Colombia
16:00 UTC−5	T. Gutiérrez 69'; Falcao 75' (pen.), 84' (pen.)	Report	Vidal 19' (pen.); Sánchez 22', 29'	Stadium: Estadio Metropolitano Roberto Meléndez; Attendance: 40,388; Referee: Paulo Oliveira (Brazil)

October 15 Round 18	Chile	2–1	Ecuador	Santiago, Chile
20:30 UTC−3	Sánchez 35'; Medel 38'	Report	Caicedo 66'	Stadium: Estadio Nacional; Attendance: 47,458; Referee: Leandro Vuaden (Brazil)

==== Friendly matches ====
January 15 Friendly	Chile	2–1	Senegal	La Serena, Chile
	C. Muñoz 52'; Meneses 65' (pen.)	Report	P. Sané 10'	Stadium: Estadio La Portada; Attendance: 10,000; Referee: G. Delfino

January 19 Friendly	Chile	3–0	Haiti	Concepción, Chile
	C. Muñoz 48'; Fuenzalida 57'; P. Rubio 76'			Stadium: Estadio Municipal de Concepción; Attendance: 10,000

February 6 Friendly	Chile	2–1	Egypt	Madrid, Spain
	Vargas 59'; Carmona 66'		Salah 87'	Stadium: Vicente Calderón Stadium

April 24 Friendly	Brazil	2–2	Chile	Belo Horizonte, Brazil
22:00 UTC-3	Réver 24'; Neymar 54'		González 7'; Vargas 63'	Stadium: Estádio Mineirão; Attendance: 53,331; Referee: Carlos Amarilla

August 14 Friendly	Iraq	0–6	Chile	Copenhagen, Denmark
			Mena 7'; Sánchez 20', 28'; Beausejour 36', 45'; Henríquez 79'	Stadium: Brøndby Stadium; Attendance: 7,000; Referee: Michael Johansen

September 10 Friendly	Spain	2–2	Chile	Geneva, Switzerland
20:00 UTC+2	Soldado 38'; Navas 90+1'	Report	Vargas 5', 44'	Stadium: Stade de Genève; Attendance: 20,000; Referee: Adrien Jaccottet (Switzerland)

November 15 Friendly	England	0–2	Chile	London, England
20:00 UTC+0		Report	Sánchez 7', 90'	Stadium: Wembley Stadium; Attendance: 62,953; Referee: Florian Meyer (Germany)

November 19 Friendly	Brazil	2–1	Chile	Toronto, Canada
19:00 UTC-5	Hulk 14'; Robinho 79'	Report	Vargas 71'	Stadium: Rogers Centre; Attendance: 38,514; Referee: Silviu Petrescu (Canada)

== Record ==
Competition	GP	W	D	L	GF	GA
International Friendly	8	5	2	1	20	8
2014 FIFA World Cup qualification	7	5	1	1	15	7
Total	15	10	3	2	35	14

== Goal scorers ==
Player	Goals
Eduardo Vargas	9
Alexis Sánchez	8
Arturo Vidal	4
Jean Beausejour	2
Marcos González	2
Carlos Muñoz	2
Fernando Meneses	1
José Pedro Fuenzalida	1
Patricio Rubio	1
Carlos Carmona	1
Esteban Paredes	1
Eugenio Mena	1
Ángelo Henríquez	1
Gary Medel	1
