= Ángelo Henríquez =

Chilean footballer (born 1994)

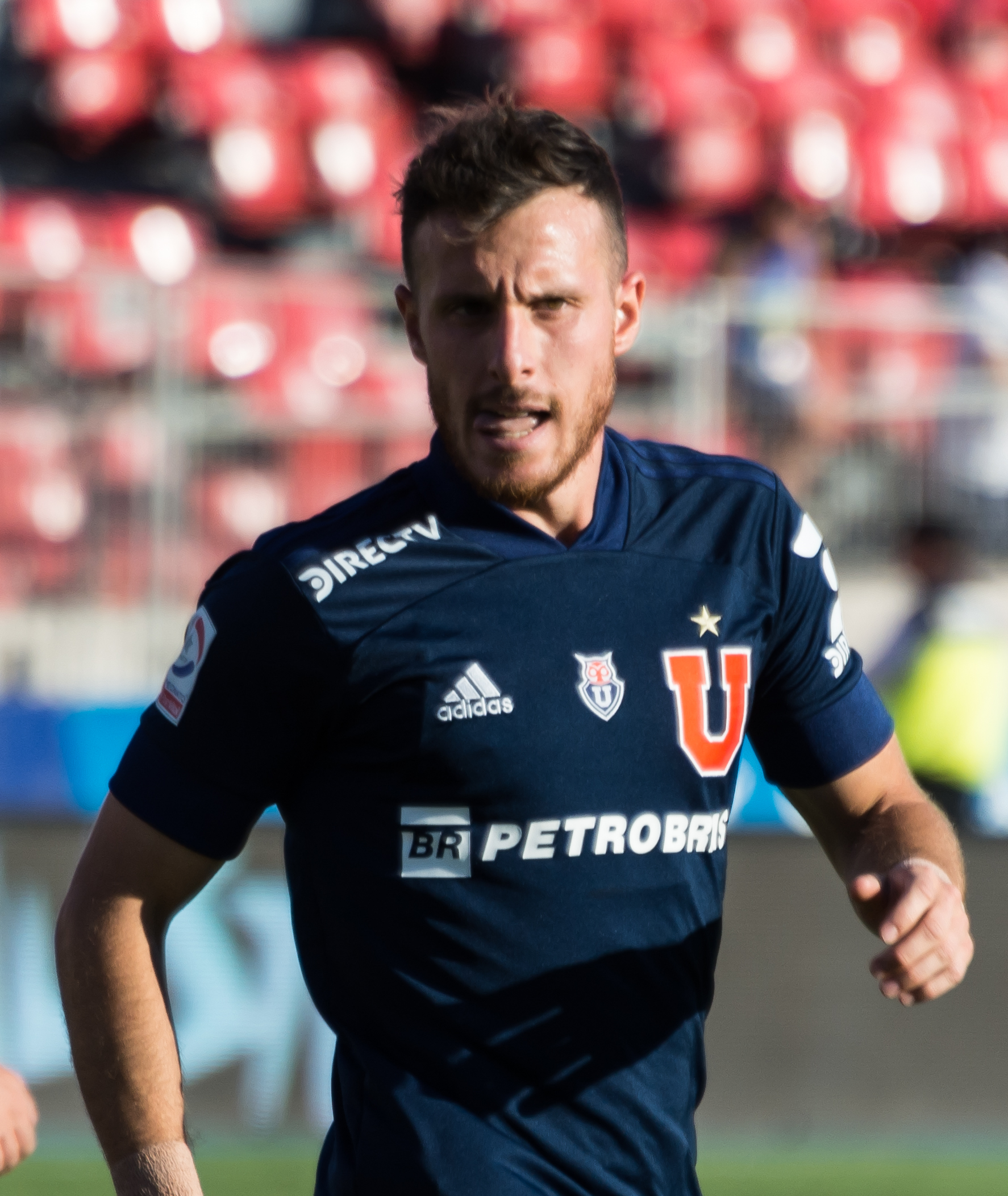
- Henríquez with Universidad de Chile in 2020

Personal information
- Full name: Ángelo José Henríquez Iturra
- Date of birth: 13 April 1994 (age 32)
- Place of birth: La Reina, Santiago, Chile
- Height: 1.75 m (5 ft 9 in)
- Position: Forward

Team information
- Current team: Deportes La Serena
- Number: 9

Youth career
- 2007–2011: Universidad de Chile

Senior career*
Years	Team	Apps	(Gls)
2011–2012	Universidad de Chile	17	(11)
2012–2015	Manchester United	0	(0)
2013	→ Wigan Athletic (loan)	4	(1)
2013–2014	→ Real Zaragoza (loan)	25	(6)
2014–2015	→ Dinamo Zagreb (loan)	25	(21)
2015–2017	Dinamo Zagreb	65	(14)
2016–2017	Dinamo Zagreb II	2	(0)
2018	Atlas	17	(1)
2018–2021	Universidad de Chile	53	(12)
2021–2022	Fortaleza	14	(0)
2022–2023	Miedź Legnica	29	(7)
2023–2024	Baltika Kaliningrad	26	(6)
2024–2025	Lamia	13	(0)
2025–	Deportes La Serena	15	(3)

International career^{‡}
2009	Chile U15		
2010–2011	Chile U17	6	(3)
2013	Chile U20	5	(2)
2012–2022	Chile	14	(2)
Medal record
Representing Chile
Winner	Copa América	2015
- * Club domestic league appearances and goals as of 2 March 2025 ‡ National team caps and goals as of 27 September 2022

Ángelo José Henríquez Iturra (pronounced [ˈaɲɟʝelo enˈrikes]; born 13 April 1994) is a Chilean professional footballer who plays as a forward for Deportes La Serena.

Henríquez began his career with Universidad de Chile before moving to English club Manchester United in 2012. After loan spells with Wigan Athletic, Real Zaragoza and Dinamo Zagreb, he joined Dinamo Zagreb on a permanent basis in July 2015.

A full international since 2012, Henríquez was part of the Chilean squad that won the 2015 Copa América.

== Club career ==
=== Early career ===
Henríquez began his football career with Universidad de Chile in 2007 at the age of 13, taking up the sport after he had stopped playing tennis, the sport that he played until the age of 12. In 2009, Henríquez went on trial with Manchester United, who purchased the rights to sign Henríquez for €4 million at any point until 2014.

=== Universidad de Chile ===
On 27 June 2011, Henríquez professionally started for the club in a Copa Chile match that Universidad de Chile beat Unión San Felipe 1–0 with a goal scored by Francisco Castro in the 80th minute. He failed to play in all the second semester, but was part of team directed by Jorge Sampaoli that was champion of Clausura Tournament and the Copa Sudamericana.

After the departure of Gustavo Canales to Chinese Super League club Dalian Aerbin, the club desperately tried to sign a striker, nonetheless, Jorge Sampaolí trusted the talented Henríquez to replace Canales in the starting line-up for the 2012 season, despite the interest of other clubs that wanted him on loan. On 22 February, he scored on his international debut in the Copa Libertadores in a 5–1 win over Godoy Cruz of Mendoza, in where Henríquez scored the last goal of the victory in the 90th minute. On 28 February, he incremented his goal tally scoring twice in a 4–1 win over Cobreloa, being this his first goals for tournaments of the Chilean Primera División.

=== Manchester United ===
On 21 August 2012, Manchester United announced that Henríquez had been granted a governing body endorsement which would allow him to register and play for the club. His signing was confirmed on 5 September, and he was given the squad number 21. Henríquez made his debut for United as he featured for the under-21 side and scored the final goal in a 4–2 win over Newcastle United.

==== Wigan Athletic loan ====
On 2 January 2013, Henríquez joined Wigan Athletic on loan until the end of the 2012–13 season. It was confirmed he could wear the number 11 shirt. He made his debut in English football as a half-time substitute for Daniel Redmond in an FA Cup third-round game against Bournemouth on 5 January, a 1–1 draw at the DW Stadium. His Premier League debut came two weeks later as a 71st-minute substitute for Emmerson Boyce against Sunderland, and eight minutes later he headed in Shaun Maloney's cross for Wigan's second goal in a 3–2 home loss. He won his first major trophy on 11 May 2013, as an unused substitute in the 1–0 FA Cup Final win against favourites Manchester City.

==== Real Zaragoza loan ====
Henríquez returned to Manchester United ahead of the 2013–14 season and scored the equaliser in a 1–1 draw with Swedish club AIK in the final match of the club's pre-season tour on 6 August 2013. On 28 August, he joined Real Zaragoza on a season-long loan. He made his Segunda División debut three days later, as a 54th-minute substitute for Víctor Rodríguez in a 1–0 defeat away to Barcelona B. On 21 September, he scored his first goal, opening a 2–1 win against Real Madrid Castilla after five minutes. He scored six times in 25 matches, 20 as a starter, including a first-half brace in a 4–2 win at Mallorca on 6 October.

=== Dinamo Zagreb ===
==== Initial loan ====
On 11 August 2014, Henríquez signed a loan contract with Croatian football club Dinamo Zagreb. Upon arrival he was given the shirt number 9, and made his debut for the club four days after signing in the league match against RNK Split, replacing Duje Čop for the last 17 minutes of a 1–0 win at the Stadion Maksimir. He scored his first goal for Dinamo in the Eternal derby away to Hajduk Split on 31 August, coming off the bench for Ognjen Vukojević in the 59th minute and confirming a 3–2 win in added time. He then scored league hat-tricks against NK Lokomotiva, RNK Split and Hajduk Split, ending with 29 goals in 37 appearances in all competitions.

==== Permanent transfer ====
On 6 July 2015, Henríquez joined Dinamo Zagreb on a permanent deal for an undisclosed fee. He scored for the club 22 days later in the third qualifying round of the season's Champions League, heading the equaliser in a 1–1 home draw with Molde.

=== Club Atlas ===
On 27 December 2017, Henriquez signed for Mexican club Atlas costing €1.5 million. Officially announcing the signing on their website.

=== Return to Universidad de Chile ===
On second half 2018, he returned to Universidad de Chile to replace Mauricio Pinilla, staying until the second half 2021.

=== Fortaleza ===
On second half 2021, he moved to Brazilian club Fortaleza on a deal until 12 December 2022.

=== Miedź Legnica ===
On 15 June 2022, Henríquez moved to the newly promoted Polish Ekstraklasa side Miedź Legnica, signing a three-year contract.

=== Baltika Kaliningrad ===
On 12 July 2023, Henríquez signed a two-year contract with Russian Premier League club Baltika Kaliningrad. Henríquez left Baltika on 16 June 2024, following their relegation from the RPL.

=== Lamia ===
On 6 September 2024, Henríquez moved to Greek club Lamia. He ended his contract on 1 March 2025.

=== Return to Chile ===
Henríquez signed with Deportes La Serena on 4 March 2025.

== International career ==
Henríquez has consistently participated in the youth national football teams in Chile, the 2009 South American Under-15 in Bolivia, where he scored two goals against Paraguay, the 2010 South American Games and the 2011 South American Under-17 in Ecuador, where he scored against Colombia, Brazil and Venezuela.

Henríquez made his debut for the Chile senior team on 14 November 2012, coming on as a 20th-minute substitute for the injured Alexis Sánchez and scoring Chile's only goal with two minutes remaining with a header from Matías Fernández's cross in a 3–1 friendly defeat by Serbia at the AFG Arena in Switzerland. In his next game on 14 August 2013, he concluded a 6–0 friendly win over Iraq at the Brøndby Stadium.

In May 2015, Henríquez was included in Chile's squad for the 2015 Copa América. He made his first appearance in the final group game against Bolivia at the Estadio Nacional, coming on at half time for Sánchez and sending in the cross from which Ronald Raldes' own goal concluded a 5–0 victory. In the final against Argentina, he came on for Eduardo Vargas at the start of extra time, as Chile won their first major international honour in a penalty shoot-out following a goalless draw.

== Personal life ==
He is the younger brother of the former footballer César Henríquez, who played for Universidad de Chile too.

== Career statistics ==
=== Club ===
As of match played 2 June 2024

Club	Season	League			Cup		League Cup		Continental		Other		Total	
Club	Season	Division	Apps	Goals	Apps	Goals	Apps	Goals	Apps	Goals	Apps	Goals	Apps	Goals
Universidad de Chile	2011	Primera División	0	0	1	0	—		0	0	—		1	0
Universidad de Chile	2012	Primera División	17	11	0	0	—		10 (Note: Appearance(s) in Copa Libertadores)	4	—		27	15
Universidad de Chile	Total		17	11	1	0	—		10	4	—		28	15
Manchester United	2012–13	Premier League	0	0	0	0	0	0	0	0	0	0	0	0
Manchester United	2013–14	Premier League	0	0	0	0	0	0	0	0	0	0	0	0
Manchester United	2014–15	Premier League	0	0	0	0	0	0	0	0	0	0	0	0
Manchester United	Total		0	0	0	0	0	0	0	0	0	0	0	0
Wigan Athletic (loan)	2012–13	Premier League	4	1	4	0	0	0	—		—		8	1
Real Zaragoza (loan)	2013–14	La Liga	25	6	0	0	—		—		—		25	6
Dinamo Zagreb (loan)	2014–15	Croatian First Football League	25	20	6	6	—		6 (Note: Appearance(s) in UEFA Europa League)	3	—		37	30
Dinamo Zagreb	2015–16	Croatian First Football League	27	8	4	1	—		8 (Note: Appearance(s) in UEFA Champions League)	2	—		39	11
Dinamo Zagreb	2016–17	Croatian First Football League	20	1	4	1	—		6	0	—		30	2
Dinamo Zagreb	2017–18	Croatian First Football League	18	5	2	3	—		3	1	—		23	9
Dinamo Zagreb	Total		90	35	16	11	—		23	6	—		129	52
Atlas	2017–18	Liga MX	17	1	3	1	—		—		—		20	2
Atlas	2018–19	Liga MX	0	0	1	0	—		—		—		1	0
Atlas	Total		17	1	4	1	—		—		—		21	2
Universidad de Chile	2018	Primera División	9	4	—		—		—		—		9	4
Universidad de Chile	2019	Primera División	10	2	5	2	—		2	0	—		17	4
Universidad de Chile	2020	Primera División	26	5	—		—		2	0	—		28	5
Universidad de Chile	2021	Primera División	8	1	—		—		2	1	—		10	2
Universidad de Chile	Total		53	12	5	2	—		6	1	—		64	15
Fortaleza	2021	Série A	14	0	4	1	—		—		—		18	1
Fortaleza	2022	Série A	0	0	1	0	—		—		1 (Note: Appearances in Campeonato Cearense)	0	2	0
Fortaleza	Total		14	0	5	1	—		—		1	0	19	1
Miedź Legnica	2022–23	Ekstraklasa	29	7	0	0	—		—		—		29	7
Baltika	2023–24	Russian Premier League	26	6	12	3	—		—		—		38	9
Career total			275	79	47	18	0	0	39	11	1	0	362	108

=== International ===
As of 4 June 2018

Chile
Year	Apps	Goals
2012	1	1
2013	2	1
2014	2	0
2015	4	0
2018	3	0
2021	1	0
2022	1	0
Total	14	2

==== International goals ====
Scores and results list Chile's goal tally first.

No	Date	Venue	Opponent	Score	Result	Competition
1	14 November 2012	AFG Arena, St. Gallen, Switzerland	Serbia	1–3	1–3	Friendly
2	14 August 2013	Brøndby Stadium, Brøndbyvester, Denmark	Iraq	6–0	6–0	Friendly

== Honours ==
Universidad de Chile

- Chilean Primera División: 2012 Torneo Apertura

Wigan Athletic

- FA Cup: 2012–13

Dinamo Zagreb

- Prva HNL: 2014–15, 2015–16
- Croatian Cup: 2014–15, 2015–16

Fortaleza

- Copa do Nordeste: 2022
- Campeonato Cearense: 2022

Chile

- Copa América: 2015

Individual

- SIFUP Best Centre Forward: 2012 Torneo Apertura
- SIFUP Best Young Player: 2012 Torneo Apertura
- Croatian First Football League Team of the Year: 2014–15
- Croatian Football Cup top scorer: 2014–15
