= Patricio Jerez =

Patricio Jerez may refer to:

- Patricio Jerez (footballer, born 1985)
- Patricio Jerez (footballer, born 1987)
