= César Henríquez =

Chilean footballer (born 1981)

Personal information
- Full name: César Antonio Henríquez Iturra
- Date of birth: November 1, 1981 (age 45)
- Place of birth: Santiago de Chile, Chile
- Height: 1.81 m (5 ft 11 in)
- Position: Midfielder

Youth career
- Universidad de Chile

Senior career*
Years	Team	Apps	(Gls)
2000–2004	Universidad de Chile	69	(8)
2005	Palestino	33	(3)
2006	O'Higgins	30	(1)
2007	Deportes Melipilla	38	(8)
2008	América Cali	?	(1)
2008–2009	Panthrakikos	13	(2)
2009–2014	Palestino	125	(12)

International career
2001	Chile U20	?	(?)

Managerial career
- 2015–2019: Universidad de Chile (youth)
- 2018: Universidad de Chile (assistant)
- 2019–2024: Aspire Academy
- 2020–2023: Qatar U20 (assistant)
- 2024–: Universidad de Chile (youth)
- * Club domestic league appearances and goals

César Antonio Henríquez Iturra (born November 1, 1981) is a Chilean football manager and former player who played as a midfielder. He is currently in charge of the Universidad de Chile youth ranks.

== Personal life ==
He is the older brother of the Chile international footballer Ángelo Henríquez.

== In futsal ==
In 2016, Henríquez represented the futsal team of Universidad de Chile in the national championship of the ANFP alongside another former football players such as Nelson Pinto, Diego Rivarola and Juan González.

== Coaching career ==
Henríquez served as coach of the Universidad de Chile youth ranks and assistant of Esteban Valencia in 2018 in the first team before emigrating to Qatar and working as coach of youth players for Aspire Academy alongside the Spanish coach Edorta Murua. In that country, he also served as assistant coach of the Qatar national under-20 team.

In the second half of 2024, he returned to his homeland to take charge of the Universidad de Chile youth ranks again.

== Honours ==
=== Player ===
Universidad de Chile

- Primera División de Chile (1): 2004 Apertura
