= Chilean Superclásico =

Chilean football rivalry

Superclásico del Fútbol Chileno
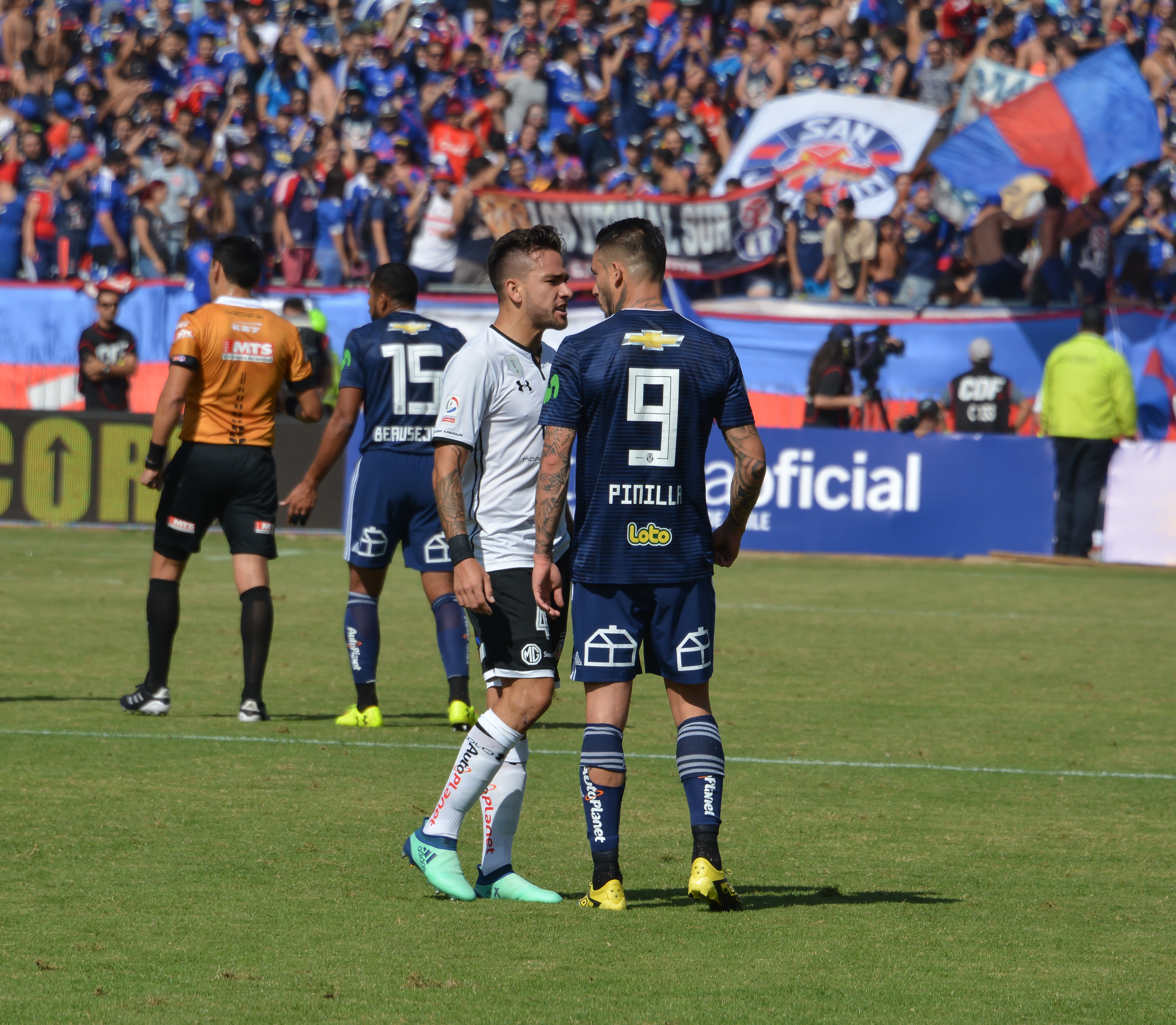
- April 2018's Superclásico.
- Location: Santiago
- Teams: Colo-Colo; Universidad de Chile
- First meeting: Colo-Colo 6–0 U. de Chile; 1938 Campeonato Nacional (7 August 1938)
- Latest meeting: Colo-Colo 0–1 U. de Chile; 2026 Liga de Primera (1 March 2026)

Statistics
- Most wins: Colo-Colo (111)
- Most player appearances: Misael Escuti (33)
- Top scorer: Carlos Campos (16)
- Largest victory: Colo-Colo 6-0 U. de Chile (7 August 1938)

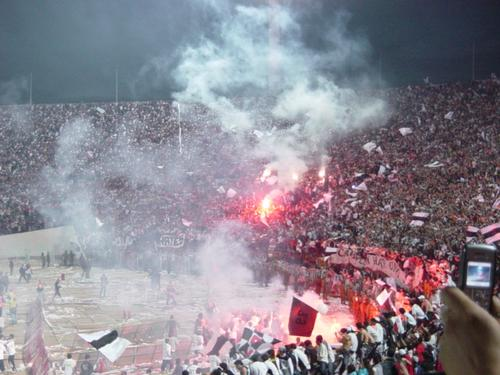
Garra Blanca, Colo-Colo

The Chilean Football Derby (El clásico del fútbol chileno) is a rivalry in Chilean football. It is contested between Colo-Colo and Universidad de Chile.

Colo-Colo is the most popular football club in Chile and though its supporters can be found in volumes through all socioeconomic strata, it has been traditionally linked to the working class. Sporting achievements since its foundation in 1925 and specially the death of its captain and founder David Arellano in 1927 gave Colo-Colo a huge fan base.

However, since the 1960s, its position of popularity has been put to test with the rise of Universidad de Chile and its Ballet Azul team. Associated with varsity values and the middle class, Universidad de Chile has seen an increase in its popularity.

== Stadiums ==
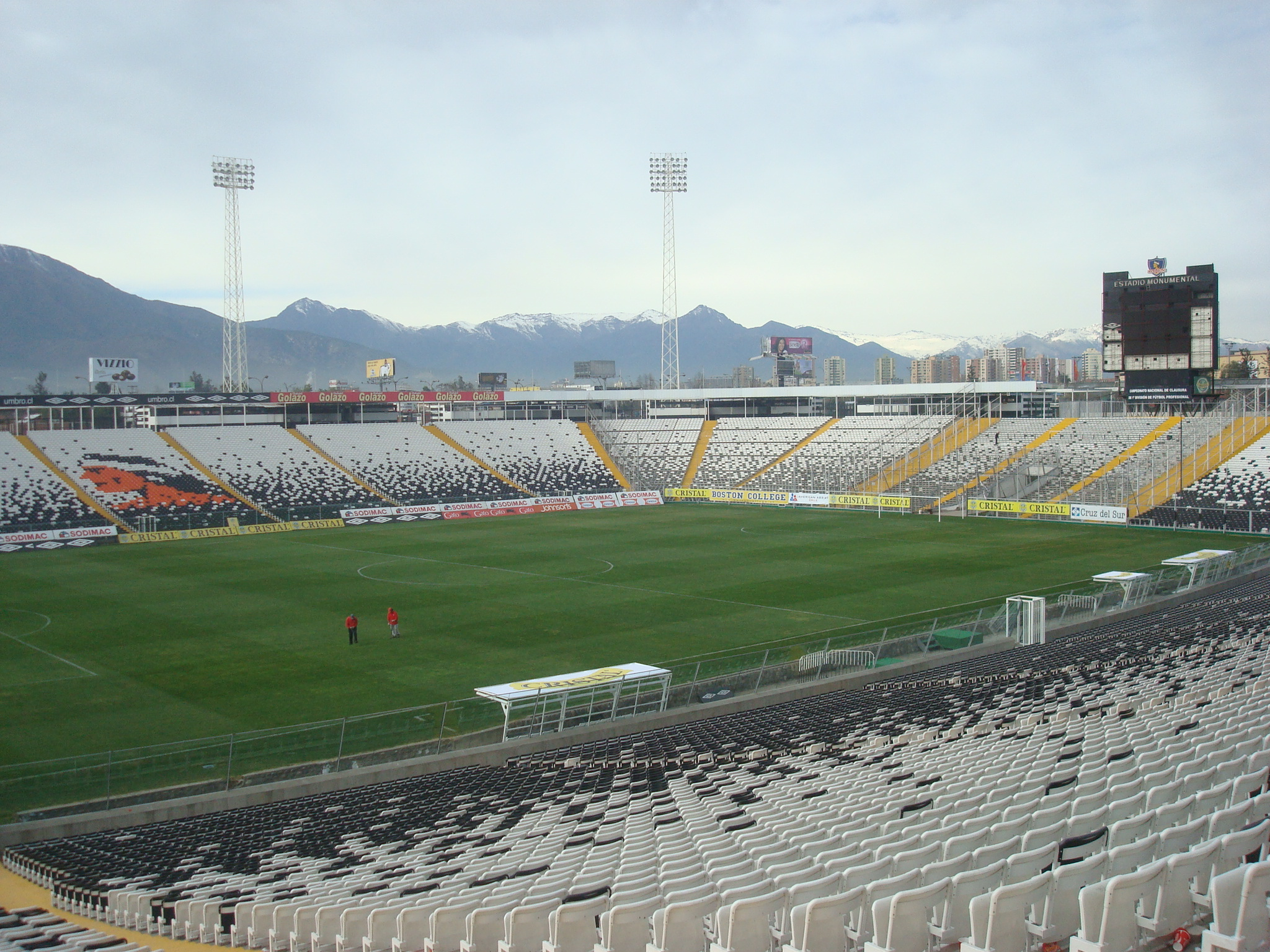
Estadio Monumental.

According to some professionals related to the design and operation of this type of works, a stadium of its own generates a social, economic, architectural and cultural impact, and is a testimony of both the evolution and performance of a sports club. Colo-Colo has been the owner of two venues: The Carabineros Stadium and the Monumental. After decades of fundraising and preliminary openings, the Monumental reopened on September 30, 1989, with its facilities as its regular headquarters since that date. It has a capacity of 43,667 spectators and has been the scene of the finals of the 1991 Copa Libertadores, the 1992 Copa Interamericana and the 2015 Copa América.

As for the Universidad de Chile, to date it does not have its own campus, having to serve as a venue in stadiums such as the Nacional and Santa Laura.

== Statistics ==
As of 1 March 2026

	Matches	Wins		Draws
	Matches	COL	UCH	Draws
Campeonato Nacional	199	90	51	58
Copa Chile	40	17	13	10
Campeonato de Apertura (1933-50)	3	1	1	1
Liguilla Pre-Libertadores	8	2	1	5
Copa Mercosur	2	1	0	1
Supercopa de Chile	1	0	1	0
All competitions	248	111	66	71

== See also ==
- Football Rivalries in Chile
