= Néstor Trecco =

Argentine footballer

Nicolás Trecco
Personal information
- Full name: Néstor Nicolás Trecco
- Date of birth: 30 November 1988 (age 37)
- Place of birth: Ameghino, Argentina
- Height: 1.77 m (5 ft 9 1/2 in)
- Position: Striker

Team information
- Current team: Barracas Central

Youth career
- Atlético Ameghino

Senior career*
Years	Team	Apps	(Gls)
2007–2008	El Linqueño	36	(2)
2009–2010	Huracán	12	(1)
2011	Unión San Felipe	15	(2)
2011	→ Cobreloa (loan)	23	(7)
2012	Universidad Católica	26	(6)
2013	San Marcos	12	(1)
2013–2014	Sacachispas	17	(1)
2014	LDU Portoviejo	40	(9)
2015	Tiro Federal BB	32	(12)
2016	Unión San Felipe	15	(4)
2016–2017	Rangers	17	(1)
2017–2018	Deportivo Roca	25	(9)
2018	Alvarado	10	(2)
2019	Mons Calpe	11	(4)
2019–2021	Cipolletti	47	(7)
2020	→ Barracas Central (loan)	7	(2)
2022	Chaco For Ever	17	(0)
2023	Villa Mitre	8	(0)
2023–	Douglas Haig	18	(0)
- * Club domestic league appearances and goals as of 4 February 2024

Néstor Nicolás Trecco (born 30 November 1988), known as Nicolás Trecco, is an Argentine footballer that currently plays for Douglas Haig as a striker.

== Career ==
He began his career at El Linqueño, aged 19, then moving to Parque Patricios' side Huracán. In January 2011, Trecco signed for Primera División club Unión San Felipe and after a successful season with the club of Aconcagua, he joined to Cobreloa in June, being runner-up of the Clausura Tournament under Nelson Acosta. The next season, Trecco completed his move to successful club of Chile, Universidad Católica for an undisclosed fee. In the same year, he switched to San Marcos de Arica.

Later, he had stints abroad in Ecuador with LDU Portoviejo, Chile again with Unión San Felipe and Rangers de Talca and Gibraltar with Mons Calpe before returning to Argentina and playing for many clubs such as Cipolletti, Barracas Central, among others.
