= Juan González (footballer, born 1975) =

Chilean footballer (born 1975)

Personal information
- Full name: Juan Claudio González Calderón
- Date of birth: 6 October 1975 (age 51)
- Place of birth: Santiago, Chile
- Height: 1.83 m (6 ft 0 in)
- Position: Centre back

Team information
- Current team: Everton (assistant)

Senior career*
Years	Team	Apps	(Gls)
1999–2002	Santiago Morning	72	(1)
2003	Deportes Temuco	13	(1)
2004–2005	Coquimbo Unido	59	(10)
2006–2007	Audax Italiano	81	(5)
2008–2010	Universidad de Chile	42	(3)
2008	→ Audax Italiano (loan)	13	(0)
2011	Deportes Iquique	27	(5)
2012	Universidad de Concepción	22	(0)
2013	Magallanes	4	(0)
Total		333	(25)

Managerial career
- 2025–: Everton (assistant)
- * Club domestic league appearances and goals

Juan Claudio González Calderón (born 6 October 1975) is a former Chilean footballer, that played as centre back. Before joining Iquique, González had successful seasons with Audax Italiano and Universidad de Chile. At Audax was the most successful in the football career of González, during the 2007 season. The defender obtained important achievements in his career thanks to his coach in this time Raúl Toro, who has also trained to González in Coquimbo Unido, which meant a share of trust very important. At Universidad de Chile, González started playing with a bad level, but then he broke into the starting lineup and won the confidence of the Uruguayan coaches: Sergio Markarián and Gerardo Pelusso, to such an extent of winning the 2009 Apertura Tournament and reach the semifinals of the Copa Libertadores 2010.

He has never played for the Chile national football team, but is a defender in Chilean football. He scored at least one goal for every team he has played for to date, has a total of 24 goals across 298 games in the Chilean Primera División, and is one of the players with the most appearances in the first division of his country.

== Early career ==
His professional debut came in the 1999 season at Santiago Morning, when he was 24, a late age for a good development in the football. Despite this, he was an undisputed titular in the team and during his period at Morning was teammate of successful players in the Chilean football like Álvaro Ormeño, Gustavo Biscayzacú, Fernando Martel, Carlos Tejas, among others.

=== Successful under Raúl Toro ===
In 2003, González left Morning for Deportes Temuco, team of the same level of his former club (first division). In the next season, he signed by Coquimbo Unido, team directed for the coach Raúl Toro, who will influence too much in the career of the defender. His team reached advance to the finals of the 2005 Apertura Tournament, but was runner-up of the tournament, being defeated by Unión Española.

In January 2006, González followed to his coach Raúl Toro and both signed by Audax Italiano. The squad was conformed by players of great technical quality like Carlos Villanueva, Roberto Cereceda, Boris Rieloff, Matías Campos Toro, among others. His team reached advance the finals of the 2006 Clausura Tournament, but again he and his team was defeated, now by Colo-Colo. In the next season, his team again nearly won the tournament, but was won by Colo-Colo, after of be eliminated in the playoffs semifinals of the Clausura Tournament 2007 by Universidad de Concepción.

In December 2007, Audax accepted a US$400.000 bid from Universidad de Chile for González, in a contract for the next three seasons.

== Post-retirement ==
In 2016, González represented the futsal team of Universidad de Chile in the national championship of the ANFP alongside another former football players such as Nelson Pinto, Diego Rivarola and César Henríquez.

In March 2025, González joined the technical staff of Mauricio Larriera in Everton de Viña del Mar as an assistant coach.

== Honours ==
=== Player ===
Universidad de Chile

- Primera División de Chile (1): 2009 Apertura
