= Diego Rivarola =

Argentine footballer (born 1976)

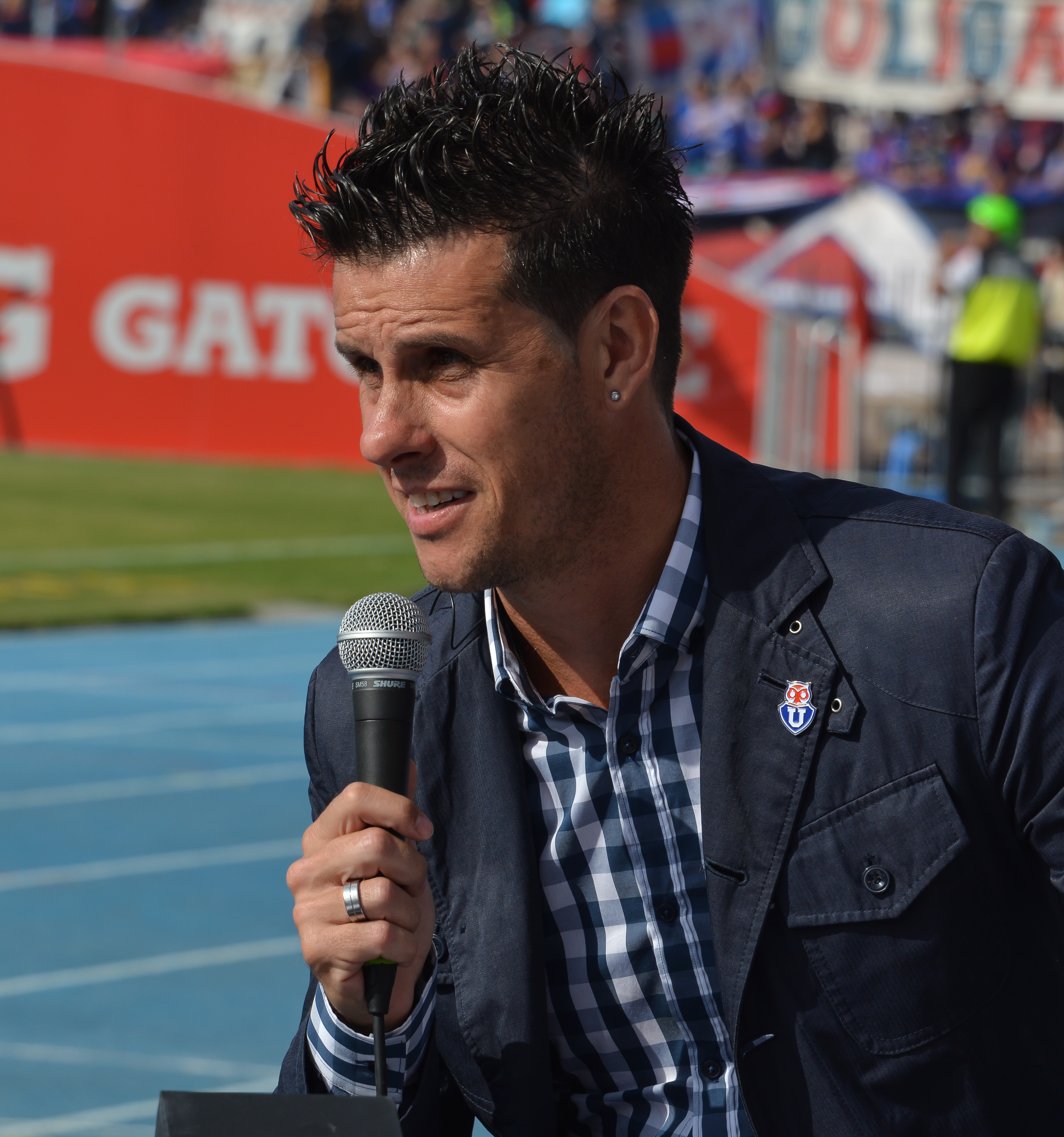
- Rivarola in 2018

Personal information
- Full name: Diego Gabriel Rivarola Popón
- Date of birth: July 14, 1976 (age 50)
- Place of birth: Mendoza, Argentina
- Height: 1.80 m (5 ft 11 in)
- Position: Striker

Youth career
- Leonardo Murialdo
- River Plate

Senior career*
Years	Team	Apps	(Gls)
1996–1997	River Plate	0	(0)
1997–1998	Platense	8	(0)
1999	Santiago Morning	23	(13)
2000–2001	Universidad de Chile	57	(23)
2002	Atlas	21	(2)
2003–2005	Universidad de Chile	100	(37)
2006	Argentinos Juniors	17	(3)
2006–2007	Maracaibo	14	(6)
2007	Palestino	20	(5)
2008	Alki Larnaca	12	(1)
2008–2009	Santiago Morning	55	(29)
2010–2011	Universidad de Chile	63	(24)
2016	Universidad de Chile (futsal)	–	(–)
2024	Vicente Pérez Rosales	–	(–)
Total		390	(143)
- * Club domestic league appearances and goals

Diego Gabriel Rivarola Popón (born July 14, 1976) is an Argentine naturalized Chilean former professional footballer who played as striker.

== Career ==
Rivarola was born in Mendoza, Argentina. As a child, he was with the Club Leonardo Murialdo in Mendoza. Next he joined the lower River Plate, but did not debut with the first team. Later he moved to Platense, where he played eight games.

In 1997, he was hired by Santiago Morning, of Chile until 2000 when he would join Universidad de Chile. His first stint with the Santiago-based club would last five years (interrupted by a brief stay at Mexican Atlas in 2002), during which he became one of the most liked players of the team, due in part to his performances at the derbies against Colo-Colo. With Universidad de Chile, Rivarola would win the Chilean National Championship in 2000 and Apertura Tournament in 2004.

At the beginning of 2006, and after conflicts with then coach of the Universidad de Chile, Héctor Pinto, Rivarola signed with Argentinos Juniors, but failed to establish himself as part of the team's starting 11 and moved to the Venezuelan club UA Maracaibo few months later.

In mid-2007 and for Torneo de Clausura, he signed with Palestino of Chile, led by his former Universidad de Chile teammate, Luis Musrri.

After playing for Santiago Morning, Rivarola moved back to Universidad de Chile, eventually appearing in the 2010 Copa Libertadores. On 2011 he won the Apertura Tournament with La "U" after six years from his last championship.

On August 28, 2011, he scored his 100th goal with Universidad de Chile in a match against Universidad de Concepción for the Clausura Tournament.

== Post-retirement ==
In 2016, Rivarola represented the futsal team of Universidad de Chile in the national championship of the ANFP alongside another former football players such as Nelson Pinto, César Henríquez and Juan González.

In June 2024, Rivarola played for club Vicente Pérez Rosales from Puerto Montt at the Copa Chile in the 0–3 loss against Universidad de Concepción.

From 2012 to 2022, Rivarola worked as an ambassador of Universidad de Chile, at the same time he was in charge of both the business and marketing areas. In February 2022, he joined ESPN Chile, along with the former footballer Jean Beausejour, as a football commentator and analyst.

== Career statistics ==
As of December 11, 2011

Appearances and goals by club, season and competition
Club	Season	League			Continental		Cup		Total	
Club	Season	Division	Apps	Goals	Apps	Goals	Apps	Goals	Apps	Goals
Santiago Morning	Torneo 1999	Chilean Primera División	23	13					23	13
Universidad de Chile	Torneo 2000	Chilean Primera División	27	11	3	1	4	5	30	12
Universidad de Chile	Torneo 2001	Chilean Primera División	30	12	4	2			34	14
Universidad de Chile	Apertura 2003	Chilean Primera División	10	0					10	0
Universidad de Chile	Clausura 2003	Chilean Primera División	16	11					16	11
Universidad de Chile	Apertura 2004	Chilean Primera División	24	13					24	13
Universidad de Chile	Clausura 2004	Chilean Primera División	16	4					16	4
Universidad de Chile	Apertura 2005	Chilean Primera División	13	2	8	3			21	5
Universidad de Chile	Clausura 2005	Chilean Primera División	21	7	2	0			23	7
Universidad de Chile	Total		157	60	17	6	4	5	178	71
Palestino	Clausura 2007	Chilean Primera División	20	5					20	5
Santiago Morning	Clausura 2008	Chilean Primera División	18	7					18	7
Santiago Morning	Apertura 2009	Chilean Primera División	18	9					18	9
Santiago Morning	Clausura 2009	Chilean Primera División	19	13					19	13
Santiago Morning	Total		55	29					55	29
Universidad de Chile	Torneo 2010	Chilean Primera División	31	16	14	1	2	0	47	17
Universidad de Chile	Apertura 2011	Chilean Primera División	18	5					18	5
Universidad de Chile	Clausura 2011	Chilean Primera División	17	3	1	0	4	2	22	5
Universidad de Chile	Total		66	24	15	1	6	2	87	27
Career total			321	131	32	7	10	7	353	144

== Honours ==
Universidad de Chile

- Primera División de Chile: 2000, 2004 Apertura, 2011 Apertura, 2011 Clausura
- Copa Chile: 2000
- Copa Sudamericana: 2011
