= Gustavo Canales =

Argentine-born Chilean footballer (born 1982)

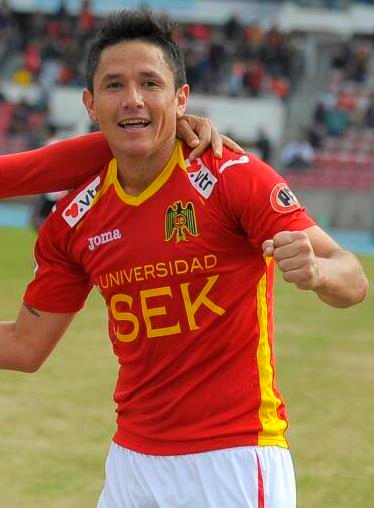
- Canales with Unión Española in 2013

Personal information
- Full name: Gustavo Javier Canales Bustos
- Date of birth: 30 March 1982 (age 44)
- Place of birth: General Roca, Río Negro, Argentina
- Height: 1.86 m (6 ft 1 in)
- Position: Forward

Youth career
- Deportivo Roca

Senior career*
Years	Team	Apps	(Gls)
2004	Deportivo Roca	?	(?)
2004–2006	Cipolletti	25	(10)
2005	→ Aldosivi (loan)	5	(0)
2006	Guillermo Brown	12	(3)
2007–2008	Deportes La Serena	29	(21)
2007–2008	→ Once Caldas (loan)	33	(4)
2009	Unión Española	33	(21)
2010	River Plate	14	(2)
2010	Unión Española	17	(14)
2011	Universidad de Chile	29	(16)
2012	Dalian Aerbin	13	(6)
2012	Arsenal de Sarandí	7	(0)
2013–2014	Unión Española	29	(18)
2014–2016	Universidad de Chile	42	(27)
2016–2017	Botafogo	9	(1)
2017–2018	Unión Española	10	(4)
Total		307	(147)

International career
2011	Chile	1	(0)

Managerial career
- 2019: Unión Española (assistant)
- 2020–2021: Deportes La Serena (sporting director)
- 2021–2022: Unión Española U21
- 2022: Unión Española (interim)
- 2023: Audax Italiano (assistant)
- 2024–2025: Unión Española (sporting director)
- * Club domestic league appearances and goals

Gustavo Javier Canales Bustos (Spanish pronunciation: [ɡusˈtaβo kaˈnales]; born 30 March 1982) is a Chilean football coach and former player who played as a forward.

== Club career ==
He began his career at hometown Deportivo Roca in 2004. After his spells at Cipolletti, Aldosivi and Guillermo Brown, in 2007 he joined Chilean outfit Deportes La Serena.

In January 2010 the Argentinian club River Plate signed the striker from Unión Española on a 70% to 30% joint ownership deal for around $1 million until 2013. After a poor season with los millonarios, Canales returned to Chile to play for Unión Española.

Canales joined Chinese Super League side Dalian Aerbin on 11 February 2012 for a fee of US$2.6 million and signing a three-year deal. Canales scored four goals in his first five league games with Dalian Aerbin.

In 2013 Canales was suspended for 3 months after he failed a drug test.

== International career ==
On 3 November 2011, was reported that Chile national team coach Claudio Borghi dispensed with Mauricio Pinilla due to knee injury, so he called Canales to play the 2014 World Cup qualification games with Uruguay and Paraguay amid a difficult environment that lived the team marked by showbiz scandals.

He internationally debuted on 11 November during the Uruguayan 4–0 thrash over Chile coming on as a 73rd-minute substitute.

In 2014, received a call-up from now manager Jorge Sampaoli (who coached him at Universidad de Chile) to play against Costa Rica at Coquimbo on 22 January, related to final nominees preparation to 23-man World Cup squad. However it was reported on 18 January that he would miss the game due to injury. Months later Canales was considered in the 30-provisional-man squad because his good shape shown at Unión Española despite missing the previous friendly matches.

== Managerial career ==
In March 2021, he assumed as coach of the Unión Española U21 team. In September 2022, he took in charge of Unión Española senior team as interim manager after César Bravo was released.

On 21 November 2022, Unión Española announced that Canales was leaving the role of manager, and would not take any other role at the club. In April 2023, he joined Audax Italiano as the assistant coach of Luca Marcogiuseppe.

In 2024, Canales assumed as sporting director of Unión Española.

In 2023, Canales started a scouting football agency named "La Cantera Scouting" (The Scouting Academy).

== Personal life ==
At the end of 2010, he was naturalized Chilean nationality law, both his mother and his grandmother are Chilean.

== Career statistics ==
Season	Club	League		Cup		Continental		Other		Total	
Season	Club	Apps	Goals	Apps	Goals	Apps	Goals	Apps	Goals	Apps	Goals
La Serena	2007	13	11	—		—		—		13	11
La Serena	2008	16	10	—		—		—		16	10
La Serena	Total	29	21	—		—		—		29	21
Once Caldas (loan)	2007	19	3	—		—		—		19	3
Once Caldas (loan)	2008	14	1	—		—		—		14	1
Once Caldas (loan)	Total	33	4	—		—		—		33	4
Unión Española	2009	33	21	2	3	4	3	—		39	27
Unión Española	Total	33	21	2	3	4	3	—		39	27
River Plate	2009-10	14	2	—		—		—		14	2
River Plate	Total	14	2	—		—		—		14	2
Unión Española	2010	17	14	1	0	—		4	5	22	19
Unión Española	Total	17	14	—		—		4	5	21	19
Universidad de Chile	2011	29	16	—		8	3	—		37	19
Universidad de Chile	Total	29	16	—		8	3	—		37	19
Dalian Aerbin	2012	13	6	1	0	—		—		14	6
Dalian Aerbin	Total	13	6	1	0	—		—		14	6
Arsenal de Sarandí	2012-13	7	0	—		—		1	0	8	0
Arsenal de Sarandí	Total	7	0	—		—		1	0	8	0
Unión Española	2013	9	6	—		—		—		9	6
Unión Española	2013-14	20	12	1	0	7	4	1	1	29	17
Unión Española	Total	29	18	1	0	7	4	1	1	38	23
Universidad de Chile	2014-15	25	18	—		5	2	1	0	31	20
Universidad de Chile	2015-16	17	9	8	6	2	0	0	0	27	15
Universidad de Chile	Total	42	27	8	6	7	2	1	0	58	35
Total		245	127	13	9	26	12	7	6	292	156

== Honours ==
=== Club ===
Universidad de Chile

- Primera División de Chile (3): 2011 Apertura, 2011 Clausura, 2014 Apertura
- Copa Sudamericana: 2011
- Copa Chile: 2015
- Supercopa de Chile: 2015

Unión Española

- Primera División de Chile: 2013 Transición
- Supercopa de Chile: 2013

Arsenal de Sarandí

- Supercopa Argentina: 2012
