= Patricio Jerez (footballer, born 1985) =

Chilean footballer (born 1985)

Personal information
- Full name: Patricio Andrés Jerez Díaz
- Date of birth: 19 May 1985 (age 41)
- Place of birth: Rancagua, Chile
- Height: 1.69 m (5 ft 6 1/2 in)
- Position: Left back

Senior career*
Years	Team	Apps	(Gls)
2008	Magallanes	21	(3)
2009–2010	Huachipato	24	(0)
2011–2012	Colo-Colo	24	(0)
2012	→ Cobreloa (loan)	7	(0)
2012–2018	Deportes Antofagasta	133	(0)
- * Club domestic league appearances and goals as of 10 February 2019

Patricio Andrés Jerez Díaz (born 19 May 1985) is a Chilean footballer who plays as a left back.

== Club career ==
=== Colo-Colo ===
On 14 December 2010, was revealed that Jerez would arrive to the giant club of Colo-Colo on replace of Roberto Cereceda, who was banned for doping problems. The other possible candidates to replace Cereceda were his team-mate Nelson Rebolledo and Matías Campos Toro of Audax Italiano. On 16 December, two days later, his transference to Colo-Colo was confirmed, and after of the transfer confirmation he said that: "Arrive to Colo-Colo is a very big opportunity".

Jerez made his club debut in a pre-season friendly against Deportes La Serena as a starter, playing the full 90 minutes in a 1–0 loss. On 30 January 2011, he played his first competitive match against Cobresal for a league game, match that finished 2–2 draw and then in a 3–0 loss, because for administrative problems with the signing of the player Joan Muñoz. His Copa Libertadores debut came on 11 March against Táchira, playing the full match in his club victory 4–2 at Venezuela. He scored his club's first goal in a 3–2 loss against the Brazilian club Santos at the 81st minute, being the Colo-Colo's first score discount of the game, before the second discount of Diego Rubio, after of six minutes.
