= Diego Barrios (footballer, born March 1987) =

Paraguayan football midfielder

Personal information
- Full name: Diego Adalberto Barrios Coronel
- Date of birth: 29 March 1987 (age 39)
- Place of birth: Concepción, Paraguay
- Height: 1.87 m (6 ft 2 in)
- Position: Central midfielder

Youth career
- 2003–2007: Olimpia Asunción

Senior career*
Years	Team	Apps	(Gls)
2007	Olimpia Asunción		
2008	Deportivo Azogues		
2008	NK Osijek	0	(0)
2009	NK Domžale	9	(0)
2012	Agropecuario Argentino Carlos Casares		
- Sportivo Carapegua Paraguay
- * Club domestic league appearances and goals as of 23 May 2009

Diego Adalberto Barrios Coronel (born 29 March 1987) is a Paraguayan football midfielder. He last played for NK Domžale in the Slovenian PrvaLiga.

He had previously played with Olimpia Asunción, Ecuatorian Deportivo Azogues and Croatian Prva HNL club NK Osijek.
