= 1938 Campeonato Nacional Primera División =

Campeonato Nacional de Fútbol Profesional
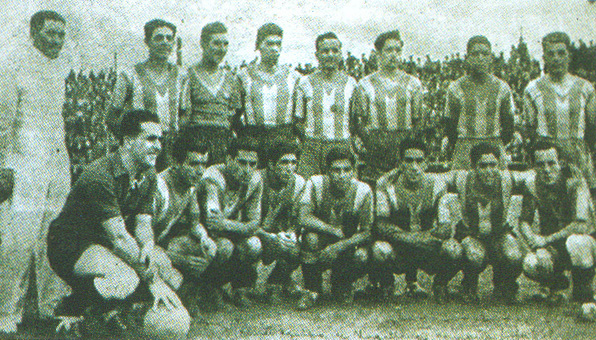
- Magallanes, champions
- Dates: 29 May 1938 – 18 December 1938
- Champions: Magallanes (4th title)
- Matches: 42
- Goals: 250 (5.95 per match)
- Top goalscorer: Gustavo Pizarro (17 goals)
- Total attendance: 84,300
- Average attendance: 2,007

The 1938 Campeonato Nacional de Fútbol Profesional was Chilean first tier’s 6th season. Magallanes was the tournament’s champion, returning to its triumphant path that led them to win three consecutive titles between 1933 and 1935.

== Scores ==
	AUD	BAD	COL	MAG	SMO	UES	UCH
Audax		5–3	4–3	1–3	2–2	3–0	4–0
Bádminton	1–5		6–7	4–7	10–2	0–5	2–1
Colo-Colo	4–5	7–2		2–6	7–4	2–3	6–0
Magallanes	2–3	4–3	3–4		4–3	1–2	3–1
S. Morning	1–0	6–5	3–2	3–6		2–1	1–1
U. Española	1–0	2–3	2–7	0–0	4–2		3–4
U. de Chile	3–0	2–6	1–6	2–2	2–4	0–2	

== Standings ==
Pos	Team	Pld	W	D	L	GF	GA	GD	Pts	Qualification
1	Magallanes	12	7	2	3	41	28	+13	16	Champions
2	Audax Italiano	12	7	1	4	32	23	+9	15	
3	Colo-Colo	12	7	0	5	57	39	+18	14	
4	Unión Española	12	6	1	5	25	24	+1	13	
5	Santiago Morning	12	5	2	5	33	44	−11	12	
6	Badminton	12	4	0	8	45	53	−8	8	
7	Universidad de Chile	12	2	2	8	17	39	−22	6	

Campeonato Profesional
1938 champions
Magallanes
4th title

== Topscorer ==
Name	Team	Goals
(Chile) Gustavo Pizarro	Badminton	17
