= Pedro Vera (Paraguayan footballer) =

Paraguayan footballer (born 1984)

Personal information
- Full name: Pedro Agustin Vera Britez
- Date of birth: 20 April 1984 (age 42)
- Place of birth: Asunción, Paraguay
- Height: 1.76 m (5 ft 9 in)
- Position: Central midfielder

Senior career*
Years	Team	Apps	(Gls)
2005	Libertad	0	(0)
2005	General Caballero ZC	6	(0)
2006	2 de Mayo	36	(1)
2007	Macará	13	(2)
2007–2009	12 de Octubre	36	(0)
2008	→ Técnico Universitario (loan)	9	(0)
2009	→ Vasco da Gama (loan)	0	(0)
2009–2011	Olimpia	8	(0)
2011–2012	Cobreloa	37	(1)
2012	Rangers	13	(0)
2013	Inter Baku	0	(0)
2013	Cerro Porteño PF	15	(0)
2014	Sportivo Luqueño	5	(0)
2014–2015	3 de Febrero	27	(0)
2016–2017	Sportivo Trinidense	8	(0)
2018	Resistencia	8	(0)
Total		221	(4)
- * Club domestic league appearances and goals

Pedro Agustin Vera Britez (born 20 April 1984) is a Paraguayan former football midfielder.

== Club career ==
He began his football career at Libertad, but after of not have continuity in that club, he joined General Caballero in June 2005. After a spell at 2 de Mayo, he played at Ecuador with Macará and Técnico Universitario in 2007 and 2008, respectively. In January 2009, he signed for Brazilian Série A club Vasco da Gama, after he had a short spell in 12 de Octubre.

Vera joined to Primera División de Chile club Cobreloa in June 2011, for play at the Torneo Clausura. In the team managed by the former Chile national football team coach Nelson Acosta, he was a key player in the runner-up earned by the club, after losing in the final against Universidad de Chile. In 2012, he switched to then Primera División de Chile club Rangers.

== Honours ==
=== Club ===
Cobreloa

- Primera División de Chile (1): Runner-up 2011 Clausura
