= Patricio Rubio =

Chilean footballer (born 1989)

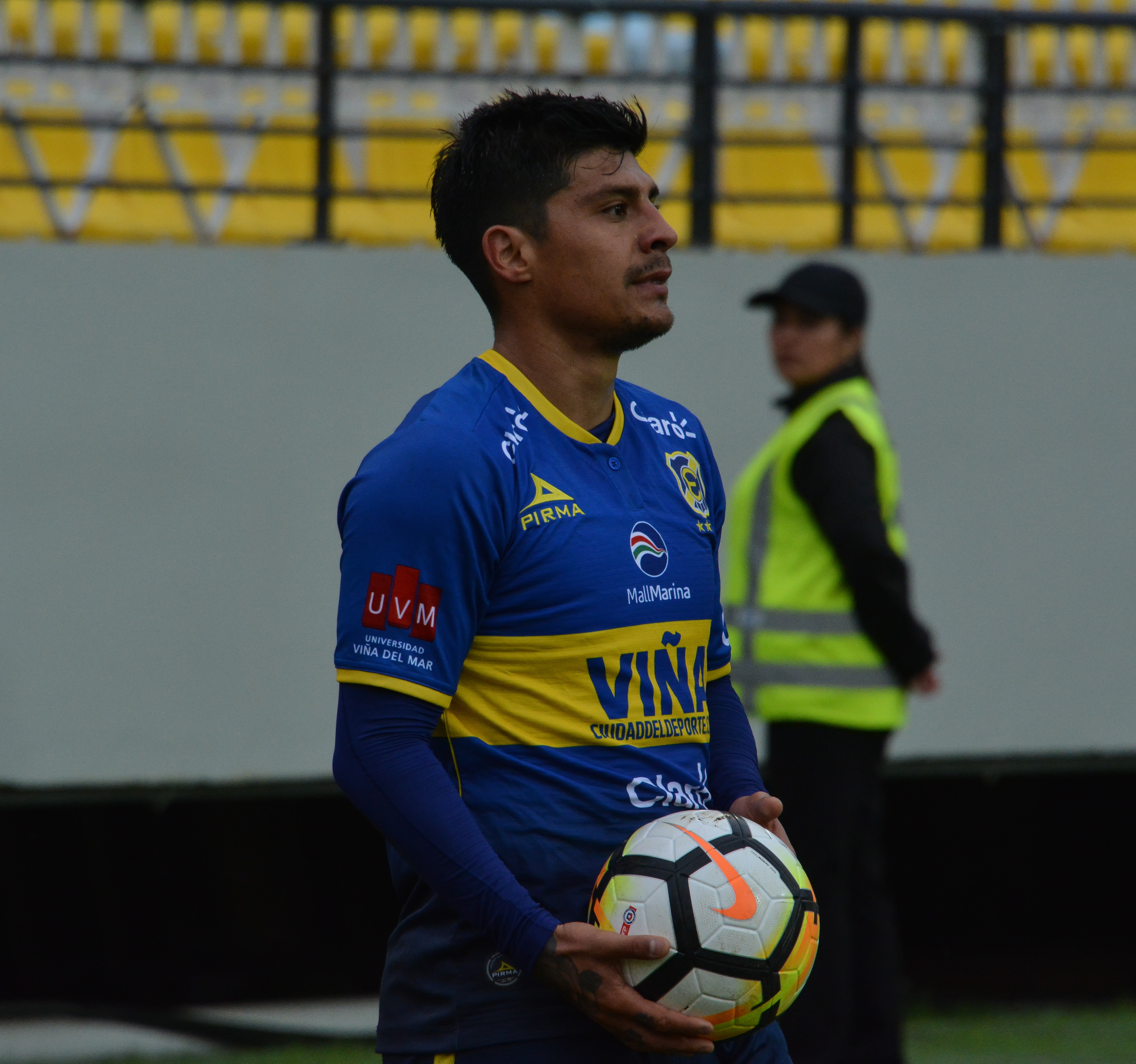
- Rubio with Everton in 2018

Personal information
- Full name: Patricio Rodolfo Rubio Pulgar
- Date of birth: 18 April 1989 (age 37)
- Place of birth: Santiago, Chile
- Height: 1.76 m (5 ft 9 1/2 in)
- Position: Forward

Team information
- Current team: Unión Española

Youth career
- 1997–2007: Colo-Colo

Senior career*
Years	Team	Apps	(Gls)
2006–2008	Colo-Colo	2	(0)
2007	→ Ñublense (loan)	0	(0)
2009–2010	Rivadavia	18	(5)
2010	Iberia	21	(5)
2011–2012	Barnechea	45	(31)
2012–2013	Unión Española	40	(18)
2012	Unión Española B	1	(0)
2013–2015	Universidad de Chile	49	(28)
2015–2018	Querétaro	23	(1)
2015–2016	→ Universidad de Chile (loan)	26	(5)
2017–2018	→ Dorados (loan)	23	(8)
2017–2018	→ Everton (loan)	37	(19)
2019	Universidad de Concepción	21	(5)
2020	Everton	8	(2)
2020	Alianza Lima	20	(6)
2021	Unión Española	25	(8)
2022–2025	Ñublense	102	(38)
2026–	Unión Española	0	(0)

International career^{‡}
2013–	Chile	3	(1)
- * Club domestic league appearances and goals as of 8 December 2025 ‡ National team caps and goals as of 24 April 2013

Patricio Rodolfo Rubio Pulgar (born 18 April 1989), nicknamed Pato Rubio, is a Chilean footballer who plays as a forward for Unión Española.

== Club career ==
Rubio spent four seasons with Ñublense from 2022 to 2025.

In January 2026, Rubio returned to Unión Española by third time.

== International career ==
=== International goals ===
Goal	Date	Venue	Opponent	Score	Result	Competition
1	19 January 2013	Estadio Municipal de Concepción, Concepción, Chile	Haiti	3–0	3–0	Friendly

== Personal life ==
Rubio is nicknamed Pato, a short form of "Patricio".

At the same time he is a footballer, he is the owner of Golden Bull Eleven, a property company.

== Honours ==
Colo-Colo

- Primera División de Chile (1): 2006 Clausura

Barnechea

- Tercera A (1): 2011

Unión Española

- Primera División de Chile (1): 2013 Transición
- Supercopa de Chile (1): 2013

Universidad de Chile

- Primera División de Chile (1): 2014 Apertura
- Copa Chile (1): 2015
- Supercopa de Chile (1): 2015

Querétaro

- Copa MX: Apertura 2016
