= Sebastián Silva (footballer) =

Chilean footballer (born 1991)

Personal information
- Full name: Sebastián Ignacio Silva Pérez
- Date of birth: July 16, 1991 (age 35)
- Place of birth: Puente Alto, Santiago, Chile
- Height: 1.80 m (5 ft 11 in)
- Position: Centre-back

Youth career
- Universidad Católica
- Audax Italiano

Senior career*
Years	Team	Apps	(Gls)
2011–2017	Audax Italiano	99	(7)
2012–2014	Audax Italiano B	6	(2)
2013	→ San Luis (loan)	12	(0)
2017	Iberia	13	(1)
2018–2019	Coquimbo Unido	46	(4)
2020–2023	Cobresal	79	(2)
2024–2026	Deportes Concepción	56	(5)
2026	Rangers	10	(0)
- * Club domestic league appearances and goals as of 25 August 2026

Sebastián Ignacio Silva Pérez (born 16 July 1991) is a Chilean footballer who plays as a centre-back. He last played for Rangers de Talca.

== Career ==
Silva spent four seasons with Cobresal from 2020 to 2023. In 2024, he switched to Deportes Concepción in the Segunda División Profesional de Chile.

In March 2026, Silva moved to Rangers de Talca from Deportes Concepción. He was released on 19 August of the same year.

== Honours ==
Coquimbo Unido

- Primera B de Chile: 2018

Deportes Concepción

- Segunda División Profesional de Chile: 2024
