= Football rivalries in Chile =

There are several football rivalries amongst clubs in Chile.

== Super Clásico ==
Colo Colo vs Universidad de Chile

The rivalry between Colo Colo and Universidad de Chile is the biggest in Chile. It was first played in 1938.

== Clásico Universitario ==
Universidad de Chile vs Universidad Católica

This match, which represents the oldest derby in Chile, between the football teams of Universidad de Chile and Universidad Católica, that represent two of the most important universities and football teams in the country. Originally University clubs, they turned professional in the 1930s and kept their amateur names.

== Colo Colo–Universidad Católica ==
Colo Colo vs. Universidad Católica

== Colo Colo–Cobreloa ==
Colo Colo vs. Cobreloa

== Clásico Aconcagüino ==
Unión San Felipe vs. Trasandino de Los Andes

== Clásico del Norte ==
San Marcos de Arica vs. Deportes Iquique

== Clásico Penquista ==
Deportes Concepción vs. Fernández Vial

== Clásico Provincial ==
San Luis de Quillota vs. Unión La Calera

== Clásico de Colonias ==
Unión Española vs. Palestino vs. Audax Italiano

There are three traditional rivals: Unión Española, founded by Spanish immigrants; Palestino, a team founded by members of the Palestinian diaspora living in Chile; and Audax Italiano, which originated from their local Italian counterpart, hence the name of the derbies. Unión Española is also the second oldest club of the Primera División Chilena with 113 years (behind Santiago Wanderers with 118 years) and all three clubs have a long history of rivalry. All three teams are based in Santiago.

== Clásico Porteño ==
Santiago Wanderers vs. Everton

It is played between Santiago Wanderers of Valparaíso, and Everton of Viña del Mar. It is the oldest derby in Chile. The first official match was played in 1944 with a 2-0 win for Everton.

One of the most notable games was on 30 April 1950, when Everton defeated Wanderers with a record derby victory of 17-0, being the highest scoreboard in any Chilean football match to this day.

== Clásico del Cobre ==
Two teams associated with the copper rich regions and the industry Cobreloa and Cobresal contest the derby since the late 70's, when the clubs were founded.

== Clásico del Maule ==
Rangers de Talca vs. Curicó Unido

== Clásico Chorero ==
Huachipato vs. Naval de Talcahuano

== Clásico del Sur ==
Puerto Montt vs. Provincial Osorno

== Clásico del Desierto ==
Deportes Antofagasta vs Cobreloa

== Clásico de la Cuarta Región ==
La Serena vs. Coquimbo Unido

== Clásico Huaso ==
Rangers de Talca vs O'Higgins

== Clásico de Independencia ==
Unión Española vs Universidad Católica
