= Joan Muñoz =

Chilean footballer (born 1989)

Personal information
- Full name: Joan Manuel Muñoz Melgarejo
- Date of birth: 20 April 1989 (age 37)
- Place of birth: Rancagua, Chile
- Height: 1.78 m (5 ft 10 in)
- Position: Left midfielder

Team information
- Current team: Unión San Felipe
- Number: 20

Youth career
- 2001–2006: O'Higgins

Senior career*
Years	Team	Apps	(Gls)
2007–2008	O'Higgins	10	(0)
2008–2009	Colchagua	?	(?)
2010	O'Higgins	?	(?)
2011	Colo-Colo	3	(0)
2012–	Unión San Felipe	2	(0)

International career^{‡}
2008–	Chile	0	(0)
- * Club domestic league appearances and goals as of 23 June 2012 ‡ National team caps and goals as of 24 February 2011

Joan Manuel Muñoz Melgarejo (Spanish pronunciation: [ˈxoam maˈnwel muˈɲos], born 20 April 1989) is a Chilean footballer that currently plays for the Primera División club Unión San Felipe as a left midfielder.
