= Diego Barrios (footballer, born July 1987) =

Paraguayan footballer

Personal information
- Full name: Diego Alfonso Barrios Suárez
- Date of birth: 20 July 1987 (age 39)
- Place of birth: Capitán Bado, Paraguay
- Height: 1.86 m (6 ft 1 in)
- Position: Striker

Senior career*
Years	Team	Apps	(Gls)
2007–2010	Santamarina	91	(23)
2010–2011	Deportivo Morón	30	(13)
2011–2012	Cobreloa	25	(9)
2012	Estudiantes RC	11	(5)
2013	Everton	28	(3)
2013–2015	Curicó Unido	22	(4)
2015	Deportivo Morón	32	(3)
2016	Germinal Rawson	6	(2)
2016–2017	Deportivo Español	14	(1)
2017	Juventud Antoniana	0	(0)
2018	Colchagua	4	(1)
2019	Ferrocarril Sud	6	(0)
Total		269	(64)
- * Club domestic league appearances and goals

Diego Alfonso Barrios Suárez (born 20 July 1987) is a Paraguayan former footballer who played as a striker.

== Club career ==
Barrios mainly developed his career in Argentina, playing for clubs such as Deportivo Santamarina, Germinal Rawson, Deportivo Español, Ferrocarril Sud, among others.

Besides Argentina, he played in Chile. On 19 July 2011, it was confirmed that by the club's president Javier Maureira that Barrios was signed by Cobreloa for replace to Alexander Corro, who was injured. Finally, the player finished as a starter and scored 9 in 25 appearances.

In Chile, he also played for Everton, Curicó Unido and Colchagua.
