= José Cantillana =

Chilean footballer and coach (born 1966)

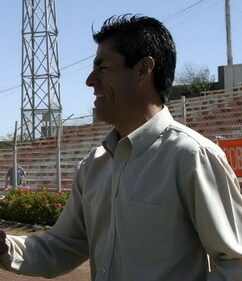
- Cantillana leading Cobresal in 2007

Personal information
- Full name: José Miguel Cantillana Galea
- Date of birth: 1 October 1966 (age 60)
- Place of birth: Iquique, Chile
- Height: 1.73 m (5 ft 8 in)
- Position: Centre back

Team information
- Current team: Deportes Iquique (youth manager)

Senior career*
Years	Team	Apps	(Gls)
1984–1989	Deportes Iquique	84	(2)
1990–1993	Cobresal	78	(0)
1994–1995	Deportes Iquique	26	(0)
1996	Cobresal	5	(0)
Total		193	(2)

International career
1989	Chile	2	(0)

Managerial career
- 1997–1999: Deportes Iquique (assistant)
- 1999–2001: Santiago Wanderers (assistant)
- 2001: Chile (assistant)
- 2002–2003: Chiapas (assistant)
- 2004–2005: Everton (assistant)
- 2006: O'Higgins (assistant)
- 2007–2009: Cobresal
- 2010–2011: Deportes Iquique
- 2011: Unión Temuco
- 2011: O'Higgins
- 2013–2014: Cobresal
- 2015: Deportes Antofagasta
- 2022: Deportes Iquique
- 2025–: Deportes Iquique U21
- 2026: Deportes Iquique (interim)
- * Club domestic league appearances and goals

José Miguel Cantillana Galea (Spanish pronunciation: [xoˈse miˈɣel kantiˈʎana], 1 October 1966) is a Chilean former footballer and current coach.

== Coaching career ==
Cantillana started his career as assistant coach of Jorge Garcés. In 2005, he graduated as a football manager at the INAF (National Football Institute) alongside former players such as Fernando Astengo, Eduardo Nazar, Eduardo Soto, among others.

Cantillana managed Chilean clubs Unión Temuco and Deportes Iquique before being appointed manager of O'Higgins F.C. in September 2011. He had a very successful spell with Iquique, winning the 2010 Copa Chile Bicentenario and 2010 Chilean Primera División B.

As coach of the Deportes Iquique under-21 team, Cantillana assumed as the interim manager of the senior team in April 2026.

== Honours ==
=== Assistant ===
Santiago Wanderers

- Primera División (1): 2001

=== Manager ===
Deportes Iquique

- Primera B (1): 2010
- Copa Chile (1): 2010
