= Javier Elizondo =

Argentine footballer

Personal information
- Full name: Javier Aníbal Elizondo
- Date of birth: 31 October 1982 (age 44)
- Place of birth: Laprida, Buenos Aires, Argentina
- Height: 1.79 m (5 ft 10 in)
- Position: Striker

Youth career
- Jorge Newbery Laprida

Senior career*
Years	Team	Apps	(Gls)
2001–2002	Jorge Newbery Laprida	–	(–)
2002–2007	Huracán TA	34	(3)
2004	→ Santamarina (loan)	6	(1)
2005	→ Deportes Arica (loan)	4	(0)
2005–2006	→ Racing de Olavarría (loan)	21	(5)
2007–2009	Santamarina	51	(19)
2009	Deportes La Serena	18	(10)
2010	Querétaro	10	(1)
2010–2011	Patronato	0	(0)
2010–2011	→ Huachipato (loan)	25	(6)
2011	Cobreloa	19	(5)
2012–2014	Deportes Antofagasta	70	(37)
2015–2016	Audax Italiano	15	(2)
2016–2017	Curicó Unido	15	(2)
2017	Huracán TA	–	(–)
2018–2020	Jorge Newbery Laprida	–	(–)
2021	Huracán TA	14	(4)
- * Club domestic league appearances and goals

Javier Aníbal Elizondo (Spanish pronunciation: [xaˈβjeɾ aˈniβal eliˈθondo], born 31 October 1982) is an Argentine former footballer who played as a striker. His last club was Huracán de Tres Arroyos.

== Teams ==
- (Argentina) Jorge Newbery de Laprida 2001–2002
- (Argentina) Huracán de Tres Arroyos 2002–2004
- (Argentina) Santamarina 2004
- (Argentina) Huracán de Tres Arroyos 2005
- (Chile) Deportes Arica 2005
- (Argentina) Racing de Olavarría 2005–2006
- (Argentina) Huracán de Tres Arroyos 2006–2007
- (Argentina) Santamarina 2007–2009
- (Chile) Deportes La Serena 2009
- (Mexico) Querétaro 2010
- (Argentina) Patronato 2010
- (Chile) Huachipato 2010–2011
- (Chile) Cobreloa 2011
- (Chile) Deportes Antofagasta 2012–2014
- (Chile) Audax Italiano 2015–2016
- (Chile) Curicó Unido 2016–2017
- (Argentina) Huracán de Tres Arroyos 2017
- (Argentina) Jorge Newbery de Laprida 2028–2020
- (Argentina) Huracán de Tres Arroyos 2021

== Honours ==
Curicó Unido

- Primera B (1): 2016–17
