= Jorge Pellicer =

Chilean football manager (born 1966)

Personal information
- Full name: Jorge Alberto Pellicer Barceló
- Date of birth: 7 February 1966 (age 60)
- Place of birth: Santiago, Chile
- Height: 1.84 m (6 ft 1/2 in)
- Position: Midfielder

Senior career*
Years	Team	Apps	(Gls)
1984–1990	Audax Italiano	132	(16)
1991	Deportes Temuco	26	(2)
1992	Unión Española	23	(4)
Total		181	(22)

Managerial career
- 2004–2006: Universidad Católica
- 2007–2008: UA Maracaibo
- 2008–2009: Universidad de Concepción
- 2011–2012: Deportes Iquique
- 2012–2013: Huachipato
- 2014–2016: Audax Italiano
- 2021: Unión Española
- * Club domestic league appearances and goals

Jorge Alberto Pellicer Barceló (born 7 February 1966) is a Chilean football manager and former footballer.

In the past, he also coached Universidad Católica.

== Other works ==
Pellicer has worked as a football commentator and analyst for TV media such as Canal del Fútbol (CDF), and DirecTV Sports. After leaving Unión Española in 2021, he announced his retirement from professional football coaching.

== Honours ==
=== Club ===
Universidad Católica

- Primera División de Chile (1): 2005 Clausura

UA Maracaibo

- Venezuelan Primera División (1): 2007 Apertura

Universidad de Concepción

- Copa Chile (1): 2008–09

Huachipato

- Primera División de Chile (1): 2012 Clausura
