= Carlos Muñoz (Chilean footballer) =

Chilean footballer (born 1989)

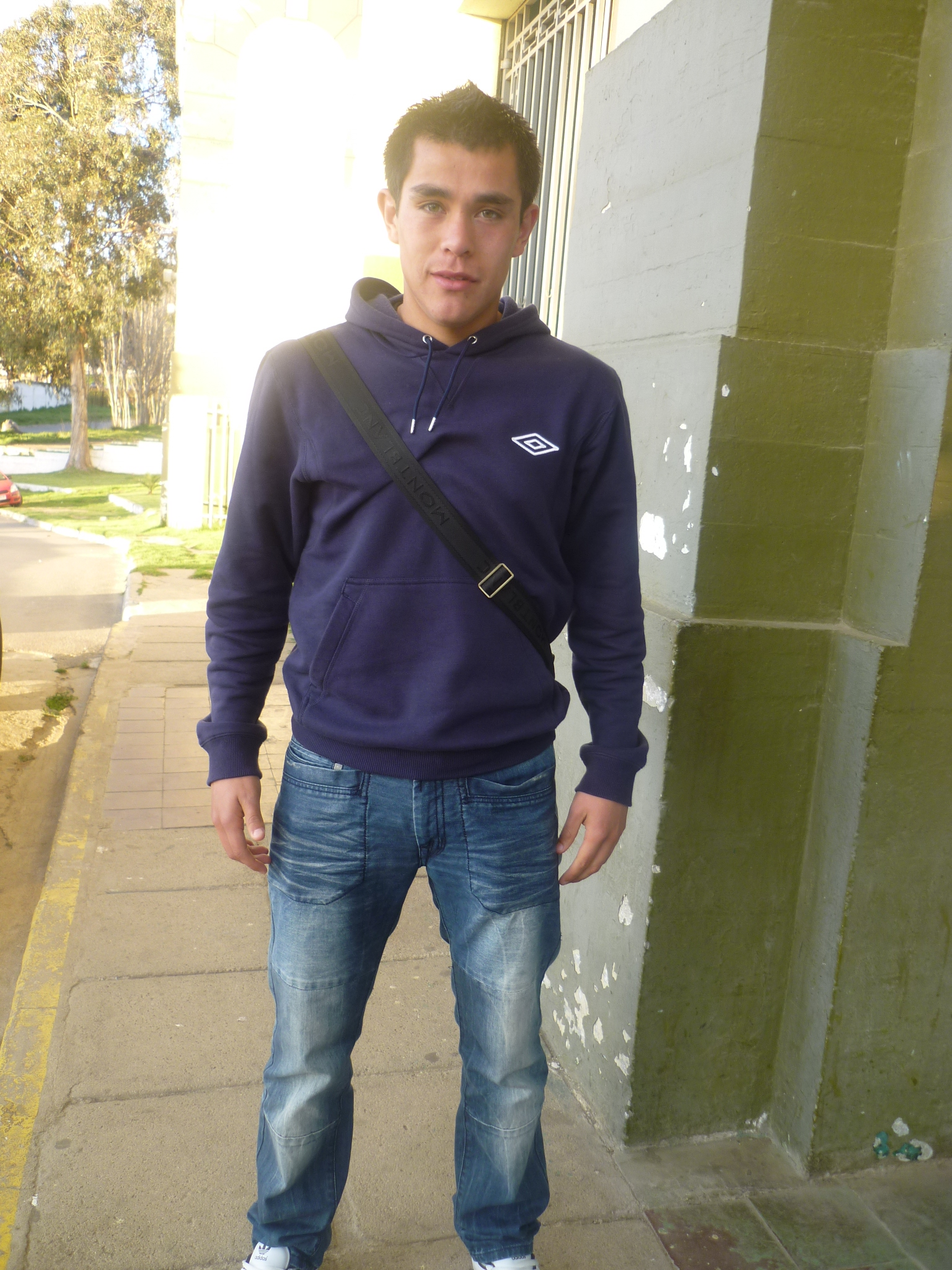
- Muñoz in 2010

Personal information
- Full name: Carlos Andrés Muñoz Rojas
- Date of birth: 21 April 1989 (age 37)
- Place of birth: Valparaíso, Chile
- Height: 1.73 m (5 ft 8 in)
- Position: Striker

Team information
- Current team: Santiago Morning
- Number: 26

Youth career
- 1995–2006: Santiago Wanderers

Senior career*
Years	Team	Apps	(Gls)
2006–2011	Santiago Wanderers	98	(35)
2009	→ Unión Quilpué (loan)	–	(–)
2011–2013	Colo-Colo	74	(35)
2013–2014	Baniyas	25	(15)
2014–2016	Al Ahli	9	(4)
2015–2016	→ Santiago Wanderers (loan)	31	(11)
2016–2017	Talleres	12	(1)
2017–2018	Unión Española	25	(1)
2019	Cobresal	19	(8)
2020–2021	Deportes Antofagasta	34	(8)
2021–2022	O'Higgins	25	(3)
2022–2025	Santiago Wanderers	70	(22)
2025–2026	Magallanes	23	(5)
2026–	Santiago Morning	0	(0)

International career
2010	Chile U22	4	(2)
2011–2014	Chile	11	(3)
- * Club domestic league appearances and goals as of 10 March 2026

Carlos Andrés Muñoz Rojas (Spanish pronunciation: [ˈkaɾlos muˈɲos ˈroxas], born 21 April 1989) is a Chilean footballer who plays as a striker for Segunda División Profesional de Chile club Santiago Morning.

== Club career ==
In 2006, Muñoz was promoted to first–team of Santiago Wanderers, a club he had been a part of since he was five years of age. He made two appearances in his first season with the first team. The next year he found more space, become the club's second choice striker for the most part and bagged two goals in 14 appearances. His third year was a further improvement, playing in even more games (18) and scoring three goals. The 2009 was loaned to Unión Quilpué in the Chilean Tercera A. The 2010 season was Carlos Muñoz real breakout season. He was the first choice striker all season and in 34 first team appearances he scored on 17 occasions. His form continued into 2011 and in the first half of the year he scored eight times in 16 appearances.

His form over the last year and a half earned him a move to Colo-Colo in June 2011 who spent US$1.5 million to bring him in.

After scoring 35 times in 74 appearances over two season at Colo-Colo, Muñoz signed for Emirati football club Baniyas.

In the second half 2022, Muñoz returned to Santiago Wanderers in the Primera B de Chile. In 2025, he switched to Magallanes.

== International career ==
He represented Chile at under-22 level in the 2010 Toulon Tournament, making 4 appearances and scoring 2 goals.

His goals led him to be called up to the Chile national team for the first time early in 2011. He made his international debut in a friendly match against Colombia on 29 March 2011.

=== International goals ===
Goal	Date	Venue	Opponent	Score	Result	Competition
1	15 January 2013	Estadio La Portada, La Serena, Chile	Senegal	1–1	2–1	Friendly
2	19 January 2013	Estadio Municipal de Concepción, Concepción, Chile	Haiti	1–0	3–0	Friendly
3	22 January 2014	Estadio Municipal Francisco Sánchez Rumoroso, Coquimbo, Chile	Costa Rica	4–0	4–0	Friendly

== Personal life ==
His daughters, Catalina and Antonella, are footballers from the Colo-Colo youth system.

== Honours ==
Individual

- Chilean Primera Division Ideal Team: 2010, 2012
- Chilean Primera Division Best Young Player: 2010
- Chilean Primera Division Best Player: 2012
