= 2010 Colo-Colo season =

Colo-Colo
2010 season
- Chairman: Guillermo Mackenna
- Manager: Diego Cagna
- Primera División: 2nd
- Copa Libertadores: Group stage
- Copa Sudamericana: First round
- Copa Chile: First round
- Top goalscorer: League: Miralles (13 goals); All: Miralles (17 goals)
Home colours	Away colours

The 2010 season was Club Social y Deportivo Colo-Colo's 79th season in the Chilean Primera División. This article shows player statistics and all official matches that the club played during the 2010 season.

== Players ==
=== Squad information ===
Note: Flags indicate national team as defined under FIFA eligibility rules; some limited exceptions apply. Players may hold more than one non-FIFA nationality.

No.	Pos.	Nation	Player
1	GK	CHI	Francisco Prieto
2	DF	CHI	Paulo Magalhaes
3	DF	CHI	Luis Mena (1st vice-captain)
4	MF	CHI	Roberto Cereceda
5	DF	CHI	Miguel Riffo (2nd vice-captain)
7	FW	CHI	Esteban Paredes
8	MF	CHI	Cristobal Jorquera
9	FW	ARG	Javier Cámpora
10	MF	COL	Macnelly Torres
11	FW	ARG	Ezequiel Miralles
12	GK	CHI	Raúl Olivares
13	MF	CHI	José Pedro Fuenzalida
14	MF	CHI	Rodrigo Millar
15	MF	CHI	Bryan Rabello
16	FW	CHI	Cristián Canío

No.	Pos.	Nation	Player
17	MF	CHI	Arturo Sanhueza (captain)
18	MF	CHI	Rodrigo Meléndez (3rd vice-captain)
19	DF	URU	Andrés Scotti
20	DF	CHI	Rafael Caroca
21	MF	ARG	Matías Quiroga
23	MF	CHI	Luis Pavez
24	MF	ARG	Lucas Wílchez
25	GK	CHI	Nery Veloso
26	DF	CHI	Sebastián Toro
27	DF	CHI	Jorge Carrasco
28	MF	CHI	Nelson Cereceda
30	FW	ARG	Gino Clara
34	GK	CHI	Ignacio González
—	FW	CHI	Nicolás Millán

=== Squad stats ===
				Total				Primera División		Copa Libertadores		Copa Chile		Copa Sudamericana		
N	Pos.	Name	Nat.	GS	App	Gls	Min	App	Gls	App	Gls	App	Gls	App	Gls	Notes
1	GK	F. Prieto	(Chile)	25	25			19		6						
2	DF	P. Magalhaes	(Chile)	18	24			19		5						
3	DF	L. Mena	(Chile)	3	3			2				1				
4	DF	R. Cereceda	(Chile)	24	25	1		18	1	5				2		
5	DF	M. Riffo	(Chile)	13	18	1		12		3		2	1	1		
7	FW	E. Paredes	(Chile)	15	20	13		16	10	4	3					
8	MF	C. Jorquera	(Chile)	6	17	6		15	6					2		
9	FW	J. Cámpora	(Argentina)	7	10	3		8	1					2	2	
10	MF	M. Torres	(Colombia)	30	35	5		25	4	6		2	1	2		
11	FW	E. Miralles	(Argentina)	25	27	17		19	13	5	3	2	1	1		
12	GK	R. Olivares	(Chile)	10	10			8						2		
13	MF	J.P. Fuenzalida	(Chile)	25	33	4		24	3	6		1		2	1	
14	MF	R. Millar	(Chile)	28	31	3		25	2	5	1			1		
15	MF	B. Rabello	(Chile)	2	5			3				1		1		
16	FW	C. Canío	(Chile)	1	5			5								
17	MF	A. Sanhueza	(Chile)	27	31			25		3		2		1		
18	MF	R. Meléndez	(Chile)	27	27			18		6		1		2		
19	DF	A. Scotti	(Uruguay)	22	22	2		16	2	6						
20	DF	R. Caroca	(Chile)	2	4			4								
21	MF	M. Quiroga	(Argentina)	16	22	4		18	4	1		2		1		
23	MF	L. Pavez	(Chile)	3	6			6								
24	MF	L. Wílchez	(Argentina)	16	17	2		15	2					2		
25	GK	N. Veloso	(Chile)	4	4			2				2				
26	DF	S. Toro	(Chile)	30	30	1		22	1	6				2		
27	DF	J. Carrasco	(Chile)	6	11			7				2		2		
28	MF	N. Cereceda	(Chile)	1	1							1				
30	FW	G. Clara	(Chile)		2			2								
34	GK	I. González	(Chile)													
36	MF	M. Sandoval	(Chile)	1	1							1				

Last updated: 23 January
Source: Competitive matches
Ordered by {{{o}}}
0 shown as blank

=== Players out ===
				Total				Primera División		Copa Libertadores		Copa Chile		
N	Pos.	Name	Nat.	GS	App	Gls	Min	App	Gls	App	Gls	App	Gls	Notes
15	DF	D. Olate	(Chile)	7	11		741	7		2		2		Left the club at winter break
16	MF	C. Aránguiz	(Chile)	10	15	2	1011	9	2	6				Left the club at winter break
22	FW	C. Graf	(Argentina)	7	13	5	594	8	2	3		2	3	Left the club at winter break
24	MF	D. Salcedo	(Paraguay)	1	1		45	1						Loaned out at winter break
9	FW	C. Bogado	(Paraguay)	12	16	6	1127	11	4	3	1	2	1	Loaned out at winter break
29	FW	Y. Pinto	(Chile)		1		21	1						Loaned out at winter break
30	FW	P. Araos	(Chile)	1	4			3				1		Loaned out at winter break

Last updated: 23 January
Source: Competitive matches
Ordered by {{{o}}}
0 shown as blank

=== Disciplinary records ===
N	Pos.	Nat.	Name	Yellow card	Second yellow card	Red card	Notes
1	GK	(Chile)	Prieto	2			
2	DF	(Chile)	Magalhaes	4			
3	DF	(Chile)	Mena				
4	DF	(Chile)	R. Cereceda	6	1	1	
5	DF	(Chile)	Riffo	4			
7	FW	(Chile)	Paredes	3			
8	MF	(Chile)	Jorquera	1			
9	FW	(Paraguay)	Bogado	3			Left the club at winter break
9	FW	(Argentina)	Cámpora	1		1	Joined the club at winter break
10	MF	(Colombia)	Torres	3			
11	FW	(Argentina)	Miralles	9		2	
12	GK	(Chile)	Olivares				
13	MF	(Chile)	Fuenzalida	3			
14	MF	(Chile)	Millar	5	1		
15	DF	(Chile)	Olate	2	1		Left the club at winter break
15	MF	(Chile)	Rabello	1			Promoted to the first team at winter break
16	MF	(Chile)	Aránguiz	3			Left the club at winter break
17	MF	(Chile)	Sanhueza	10			
18	MF	(Chile)	Meléndez	12	1		
19	MF	(Uruguay)	Scotti	9	1	1	
20	DF	(Chile)	Caroca	1			
21	MF	(Argentina)	Quiroga	2			
23	MF	(Chile)	L. Pavez	1			
24	MF	(Argentina)	Wílchez	2			
25	GK	(Chile)	Veloso				
26	DF	(Chile)	Toro	9			
28	MF	(Chile)	N. Cereceda				
27	DF	(Chile)	Carrasco	1	1		
34	GK	(Chile)	González				

Last updated: 16 January
Source: Competitive matches
Only competitive matches
(yellow card) = Number of bookings; (second yellow card) = Number of sending offs after a second yellow card; (red card) = Number of sending offs by a direct red card.

=== Players in / out ===
==== In ====
No.	Pos.	Nat.	Name	Age	EU	Moving from	Type	Transfer window	Ends	Transfer fee	Source
8	MF	(Chile)	Jorquera	21	Non-EU	O'Higgins	End of loan	Summer	2010	n/a	Dalealbo.cl
13	MF	(Chile)	Fuenzalida	24	Non-EU	O'Higgins	End of loan	Summer	2010	n/a	Dalealbo.cl
	MF	(Chile)	Meneses	24	Non-EU	O'Higgins	End of loan	Summer	2010	n/a	Dalealbo.cl
	MF	(Chile)	Lorca	25	Non-EU	O'Higgins	End of loan	Summer	2010	n/a	Dalealbo.cl
N/A	MF	(Chile)	González	24	Non-EU	O'Higgins	End of loan	Summer	2010	n/a	Dalealbo.cl
N/A	FW	(Chile)	Moya	30	Non-EU	Everton	End of loan	Summer	2010	n/a	Dalealbo.cl
	FW	(Argentina)	Carranza	29	Non-EU	Everton	End of loan	Summer	2010	n/a	Dalealbo.cl
27	DF	(Chile)	Carrasco	27	Non-EU	Palestino	Loan return	Summer	2010	n/a	Redgol.cl
25	GK	(Chile)	Veloso	22	Non-EU	Huachipato	Loan	Summer	2010	n/a	Redgol.cl
23	MF	(Chile)	Pavez	21	Non-EU	Palestino	Transfer	Summer	2010	n/a	Dalealbo.cl
19	DF	(Uruguay)	Scotti	34	Non-EU	Argentinos Juniors (Argentina)	Transfer	Summer	2010	n/a	Dalealbo.cl
21	MF	(Argentina)	Quiroga	23	Non-EU	Newell's Old Boys (Argentina)	Transfer	Summer	2014	n/a	Dalealbo.cl
22	FW	(Argentina)	Graf	33	Non-EU	Free agent	Signing	Summer	2010	n/a	Dalealbo.cl
24	MF	(Argentina)	Wílchez	26	Non-EU	Asteras Tripolis (Greece)	Loan	Winter	2010	US$ 0.7 M	Dalealbo.cl
9	FW	(Argentina)	Cámpora	30	Non-EU	Aris (Greece)	Transfer	Winter	2012	n/a	
TBD	FW	(Chile)	Millán	18	Non-EU	Tigre (Argentina)	Transfer	Winter	2015	n/a	
16	FW	(Chile)	Canío	29	Non-EU	Audax Italiano	Transfer	Winter	2012	n/a	
30	FW	(Argentina)	Clara	22	Non-EU	San Felipe	Loan	Winter	2012	n/a	

==== Out ====
No.	Pos.	Nat.	Name	Age	EU	Moving to	Type	Transfer window	Transfer fee	Source
27	DF	(Venezuela)	Rey	24	Non-EU	Caracas (Venezuela)	Loan Return	Summer	Free	Dalealbo.cl
22	FW	(Chile)	Gazale	26	Non-EU	Huachipato	Loan	Summer	Loan	Dalealbo.cl
33	DF	(Chile)	Von Schwedler	29	Non-EU	Everton	End of contract	Summer	Free	Dalealbo.cl
	MF	(Chile)	González	24	Non-EU	Cobreloa	Loan	Summer	Loan	Dalealbo.cl
1	GK	(Argentina)	Muñoz	32	Non-EU	Huachipato	Loan	Summer	Loan	Redgol.cl
28	DF	(Chile)	Romo	20	Non-EU	Palestino	Loan	Summer	Loan	Dalealbo.cl
19	MF	(Chile)	Cortés	21	Non-EU	Palestino	Loan	Summer	n/a	Dalealbo.cl
	FW	(Chile)	Moya	30	Non-EU	Palestino	Loan	Summer	Loan	Dalealbo.cl
	MF	(Chile)	Meneses	24	Non-EU	Universidad Católica	Transfer	Summer	N/A	LaTercera.cl
	FW	(Argentina)	Carranza	29	Non-EU	Godoy Cruz (Argentina)	Loan	Summer	Loan	Elsolonline.com
	FW	(Chile)	Lorca	24	Non-EU	Boulogne (France)	Transfer	Summer	US $0.5 M	Redgol.cl
	MF	(Chile)	Pavez	19	Non-EU	Rangers	Loan	Summer	Loan	
16	MF	(Chile)	Aránguiz	21	Non-EU	Quilmes (Argentina)	Transfer	Winter	Free	
15	MF	(Chile)	Olate	23	Non-EU	O'Higgins	Loan return	Winter	n/a	
24	MF	(Paraguay)	Salcedo	26	Non-EU	Cerro Porteño (Paraguay)	Loan	Winter	Loan	Dalealbo.cl
22	MF	(Argentina)	Graf	34	Non-EU		Released	Winter	Free	Dalealbo.cl
9	MF	(Paraguay)	Bogado	23	Non-EU	Olimpia (Paraguay)	Loan	Winter	Free	
29	FW	(Chile)	Pinto	19	Non-EU	Ñublense	Loan	Winter	Free	
30	FW	(Chile)	Araos	20	Non-EU	Everton	Loan	Summer	Free	

EU = if holds or not a European Union passport; Country: when 2 flags, 1st flag = country that plays for internationally, 2nd flag = country of birth; N = number on jersey; P = Position (for position name, pause mouse pointer on abbreviation); Name = Name on jersey (for more extensive name, pause mouse pointer on name); Age = age on the day of the signing; Moving from = only indicate the club the player was playing before start playing for this club in this season, for the type of the moving see Status column; Moving to = only indicates the club the player is going to play next, for the type of the moving see Status column; Ends = when the player's current contract ends; n/a = Not applicable.

== Competitions ==
=== Primera División ===
==== Standings ====
Pos	Team	Pld	W	D	L	GF	GA	GD	Pts	Qualification or relegation
1	Universidad Católica	34	23	5	6	77	39	+38	74	2011 Copa Libertadores Second Stage
2	Colo-Colo	34	22	5	7	67	34	+33	71	2011 Copa Libertadores Second Stage (Note: Colo-Colo qualified as the best team after Round 1.)
3	Audax Italiano	34	20	5	9	75	58	+17	65	Pre-Copa Libertadores Liguilla
4	Universidad de Chile	34	20	4	10	75	48	+27	64	Pre-Copa Libertadores Liguilla
5	Unión Española	34	14	10	10	58	50	+8	52	Pre-Copa Libertadores Liguilla

Rules for classification: 1st points; 2nd wins; 3rd goal difference; 4th goals scored; 5th away goals; 6th red cards received; 7th yellow cards received; 8th draw

==== Results summary ====
Overall								Home						Away					
Pld	W	D	L	GF	GA	GD	Pts	W	D	L	GF	GA	GD	W	D	L	GF	GA	GD
34	22	5	7	67	34	+33	71	13	2	2	40	15	+25	9	3	5	27	19	+8

Last updated: 24 December.
Source: Competitive Matches

==== Results by round ====
Round	1	2	3	4	5	6	7	8	9	10	11	12	13	14	15	16	17	18	19	20	21	22	23	24	25	26	27	28	29	30	31	32	33	34
Ground	A	H	H	A	H	A	H	H	A	A	H	A	H	A	A	H	A	H	A	A	H	A	H	A	A	H	H	A	H	A	H	H	A	H
Result	L	W	W	L	D	W	W	W	W	D	W	W	W	W	W	W	L	W	L	W	W	D	L	W	W	W	W	W	D	D	L	W	L	W
Position	11	5	3	6	7	5	1	3	2	2	2	2	1	1	1	1	1	1	1	1	1	2	3	1	2	1	1	1	1	1	1	1	2	2

Updated to match(es) played on 7 February. Source: Competitive Matches
A = Away; H = Home; W = Win; D = Draw; L = Loss

=== Copa Libertadores ===
Pos	Team	Pld	W	D	L	GF	GA	GD	Pts	VÉL	CRU	CC	ITA
1	(Argentina) Vélez Sársfield	6	4	1	1	10	5	+5	13	—	2–0	2–1	4–0
2	(Brazil) Cruzeiro	6	3	2	1	12	6	+6	11	3–0	—	4–1	2–0
3	(Chile) Colo-Colo	6	2	2	2	8	10	−2	8	1–1	1–1	—	1–0
4	(Venezuela) Deportivo Italia	6	0	1	5	4	13	−9	1	0–1	2–2	2–3	—

Legend: Blue = home team win; Yellow = draw; Red = away team win.

=== Competitive ===
==== Primera División ====
January 24, 2010 Week 1	U. San Felipe	3 - 2	Colo-Colo	Municipal de San Felipe
19:00	Pérez 23'; Saavedra (yellow card) 35'; Leva (p.k.) 51'; Domínguez (yellow card) 62'; Estay 76'	(Report)	20', (yellow card) 84' Miralles; (yellow card) 46' Olate; (yellow card) 56' Toro; (yellow card) 60' Meléndez; 63' Paredes; (yellow card) 78' Scotti	Attendance: 7,000; Referee: Pablo Pozo

January 31, 2010 Week 2	Colo-Colo	3 - 1	Cobreloa	Estadio Monumental
19:30	Olguín (o.g.) 23'; Meléndez (yellow card) 36'; Paredes 55'; Torres 70'	(Report)	(yellow card) 34' González; 67' Lazaga	Attendance: 20,000; Referee: Enrique Osses

February 4, 2010 Week 3	Colo-Colo	3 - 0	Santiago Wanderers	Estadio Monumental
20:00	Cereceda (yellow card) 19'; Miralles 45+1', 82', 87'; Meléndez (yellow card) 47'; Magalhaes (yellow card) 73'	(Report)	(yellow card) 10' Méndez; (yellow card) 37' Villarroel; (yellow card) 52' Mena; (yellow card) 75' (yellow-red card) 76' Méndez	Attendance: 15,000; Referee: Claudio Puga

February 7, 2010 Week 4	Unión Española	1 - 0	Colo-Colo	Santa Laura-Universidad SEK
18:30	Ligüera 27'; Marín (yellow card) 84'	(Report)	(yellow card) 56' Cereceda	Attendance: 8,501; Referee: Julio Bascuñan

February 12, 2010 Week 5	Colo-Colo	2 - 2	Ñublense	Estadio Monumental
20:00	Quiroga 56'; Bogado 82'; Millar (yellow card) 90+2'	(Report)	(yellow card) 36' Manrique; 41' González; 75' Ramos	Attendance: 9,500; Referee: Eduardo Gamboa

February 21, 2010 Week 6	Audax Italiano	2 - 3	Colo-Colo	Bicentenario de la Florida
20:00	Canío 27', (yellow card) 40'; Toledo 47', (yellow card) 47'; Martínez (yellow card) 58'; Husain (yellow card) 86'	(Report)	58', 81' Miralles; (yellow card) 73' Caroca; 85' Garrido (o.g.)	Attendance: 7,224; Referee: Claudio Puga

July 14, 2010 Week 7	Colo-Colo	2 - 0	Everton	Estadio Monumental
20:00	Quiroga 16', 21'		(yellow card) 26' Ceratto; (yellow card) 27' Montesinos; (yellow card) 57' (yellow-red card) 74' Rencoret	Attendance: 8,305; Referee: Julio Bascuñán

March 19, 2010 Week 8	Colo-Colo	6 - 1	La Serena	Estadio Monumental
20:00	Aránguiz 2', 56'; Miralles 5', (yellow card) 31'; Paredes 10'; Cereceda (p.k.) 43'; Graf 58'		17' Neira; (yellow card) 37' Meneses; (yellow card) 51' Acuña	Attendance: 5,700; Referee: Jorge Osorio

March 28, 2010 Week 9	San Luis	0 - 2	Colo-Colo	Estadio Playa Ancha
12:00	Escalona (yellow card) 41'; Pacheco (yellow card) 66'		5', 43' Paredes; (yellow card) 41' Miralles	Attendance: 4,353; Referee: Enrique Osses

April 3, 2010 Week 10	Universidad Católica	0 - 0	Colo-Colo	Francisco Sánchez Rumoroso
12:00	Fuentes (red card) 2'; Díaz (yellow card) 53'; Mirosevic (yellow card) 59'; Garcés (yellow card) 78'; Valenzuela (yellow card) 85'		(yellow card) 4' Miralles; (yellow card) 13' Meléndez; (yellow card) 14' Sanhueza; (yellow card) 59' Bogado	Attendance: 14,472; Referee: Pablo Pozo

April 10, 2010 Week 11	Colo-Colo	3 - 0	Palestino	Estadio Monumental
18:30	Sanhueza (yellow card) 33'; Miralles (yellow card) 35', (goal) 66'; Bogado 46', (yellow card) 47'; Scotti 57'		(yellow card) 48' Moya	Referee: Claudio Fuenzalida

April 18, 2010 Week 12	Huachipato	1 - 2	Colo-Colo	Estadio CAP
15:00	Sandoval (yellow card) 52'; Pérez 53'		(yellow card) 51' Magalhaes; 57' Bogado; 63', (yellow card) 74' Torres; (yellow card) 71' Cereceda	Referee: Eduardo Ponce

April 25, 2010 Week 13	Colo-Colo	1 - 0	Universidad de Chile	Estadio Monumental
15:30	Miralles 12', (red card) 38'; Sanhueza (yellow card) 31'; Meléndez (yellow card) 39'; Toro (yellow card) 90+2'		(yellow card) 34' Iturra; (yellow card) 66' Seymour; (yellow card) 90+1' Estrada	Referee: Jorge Osorio

April 30, 2010 Week 14	Santiago Morning	0 - 2	Colo-Colo	Estadio Monumental
20:00	Rodríguez (yellow card) 48'; Manríquez (yellow card) 79'		73' Bogado; 81' Graf; (yellow card) 87' Scotti	Attendance: 3,324; Referee: Eduardo Gamboa

May 8, 2010 Week 15	Cobresal	2 - 5	Colo-Colo	Estadio El Cobre
16:00	Cuello 6'; Viligrón (yellow card) 23'; Pineda 71', (yellow card) 78'		21', 34', (yellow card) 56' Fuenzalida; (yellow card) 47', (goal) 83' Miralles; 59' Torres; 89' Scotti	Attendance: 7,607; Referee: Patricio Polic

July 18, 2010 Week 16	Colo-Colo	2 - 0	O'Higgins	Estadio Monumental
15:30	Fuenzalida 1'; Miralles (yellow card) 27', (goal) 90+1'; Cereceda (red card) 55'; Meléndez (yellow card) 59'		(yellow card) 64' Vásquez; (yellow card) 88' González	Referee: Eduardo Gamboa

25 July 2010 Week 17	Universidad de Concepción	2 - 0	Colo-Colo	Municipal de Concepción
15:30	Cabral 21'; Muñoz 52'		(yellow card) 8' Magalhaes; (yellow card) 68' Toro	Referee: Jorge Osorio

1 August 2010 Week 18	Colo-Colo	5 - 2	U. San Felipe	Estadio Monumental
18:00	Wílchez 10'; Scotti (yellow card) 19'; Millar 21'; Miralles 48', 67'; Torres 53'; Toro (yellow card) 77'; Meléndez (yellow card) 85'		80' Meza; 83', (yellow card) 90' Vildozo	Attendance: 10,066; Referee: Pablo Pozo

August 7, 2010 Week 19	Cobreloa	2 - 1	Colo-Colo	Municipal de Calama
15:30	González (yellow card) 27'; Lazaga 41', 52'; Hurtado (yellow card) 84'		(yellow card) 21' Sanhueza; 22', (yellow card) 64' Toro; (yellow card) 78' Torres; (yellow card) 90+2' Scotti	Referee: Patricio Polic

August 14, 2010 Week 20	Santiago Wanderers	0 - 1	Colo-Colo	Regional Chiledeportes
15:30	Gigena (yellow card) 27'; Talma (yellow card) 74'		(yellow card) 17' Quiroga; (yellow card) 30' Pavez; 64' Wílchez	Referee: Eduardo Gamboa

August 22, 2010 Week 21	Colo-Colo	1 - 0	Unión Española	Estadio Monumental
18:30	Quiroga 29'; Cereceda (yellow card) 56'; Wílchez (yellow card) 84'		(yellow card) 25' Canales; (yellow card) 33' Madrid	Referee: Jorge Osorio

August 29, 2010 Week 22	Ñublense	0 - 0	Colo-Colo	Nelson Oyarzún
18:30	Reyes (yellow card) 27'		(yellow card) 59' Cereceda; (yellow card) 75' Sanhueza; (red card) 86' Cámpora; (yellow card) 90+1' Millar	Referee: Eduardo Ponce

September 12, 2010 Week 23	Colo-Colo	1 - 3	Audax Italiano	Estadio Monumental
18:00	Millar 20'; Carrasco (yellow card) 45' (yellow-red card) 85'; Wílchez (yellow card) 58'		(yellow card) 5' Campos; 25' Pinto; (yellow card) 27' Vilches; 48' Rieloff; 85' Olivi	Referee: Jorge Osorio

September 26, 2010 Week 24	La Serena	1 - 2	Colo-Colo	La Portada
15:30	Salazar 33'; Carreño (yellow card) 64'; Guidi (yellow card) 79'; Zenteno (yellow card) 90+3'		(yellow card) 42' Toro; 52' Paredes; (red card) 77' Cereceda; 90+4' Jorquera	Referee: Claudio Puga

September 29, 2010 Week 25	Everton	0 - 2	Colo-Colo	Estadio Sausalito
18:00	Ceratto (yellow card) 17'; Peñailillo (yellow card) 38'; Guevgeozian (yellow card) 63'; Díaz (yellow card) 78'; Saavedra (yellow card) 80'		24' Jorquera; (yellow card) 35' Sanhueza; (yellow card) 60' Meléndez; 64' Paredes; (yellow card) 68' Toro	Referee: Patricio Polic

October 2, 2010 Week 26	Colo-Colo	3 - 1	San Luis	Estadio Monumental
20:00	Cámpora 33'; Jorquera 42'; Millar (yellow card) 57'; Fuenzalida (yellow card) 62'; Paredes 80'		5' Peirone; (yellow card) 39' Pérez; (yellow card) 65' (yellow-red card) 88' Escobar; (red card) 85' Díaz	Referee: Claudio Fuenzalida

October 17, 2010 Week 27	Colo-Colo	3 - 2	Universidad Católica	Estadio Monumental
18:30	Paredes 10'; Sanhueza (yellow card) 28' (yellow-red card) 69'; Prieto (yellow card) 33'; Jorquera (yellow card) 35', (goal) 45', 47'; Quiroga (yellow card) 38'; Cámpora (yellow card) 60'		(yellow card) 18' Arruabarrena; (yellow card) 24' Meneses; (yellow card) 37' Henríquez; 86' Gutiérrez; 90+1' Mirosevic	Referee: Jorge Osorio

October 21, 2010 Week 28	Palestino	1 - 2	Colo-Colo	Estadio Nacional
20:00	Pereira 25'; Carrasco (yellow card) 59'		11' Jorquera; (yellow card) 57' Scotti; 88', (yellow card) 89' Paredes	Referee: Enrique Osses

October 31, 2010 Week 29	Colo-Colo	0 - 0	Huachipato	Estadio Monumental
18:30	Magalhaes (yellow card) 18'; Meléndez (yellow card) 24' (yellow-red card) 52'		(yellow card) 25' Villalobos; (yellow card) 57' Currimilla; (yellow card) 63' Sandoval	Referee: Claudio Puga

November 7, 2010 Week 30	Universidad de Chile	2 - 2	Colo-Colo	Estadio Nacional
16:00	González 14', (red card) 90+1'; Puch (yellow card) 42'; Rodríguez 59'; Rivarola (yellow card) 74'; Bueno (yellow card) 80'; Rojas (yellow card) 84'; Victorino (yellow card) 89'		6' Paredes; (yellow card) 42' Millar; (yellow card) 58' Toro; (yellow card) 58' (yellow-red card) 85' Scotti; (yellow card) 74' Prieto; (red card) 90' Miralles; 90+2' Cámpora	Attendance: 40,000; Referee: Pablo Pozo

November 13, 2010 Week 31	Colo-Colo	0 - 1	Santiago Morning	Estadio Monumental
20:00	Riffo (yellow card) 78'		70' Calandria; (yellow card) 78' Ribera; (yellow card) 81' Torres; (yellow card) 90+1' Ríos	Referee: Eduardo Ponce

November 20, 2010 Week 32	Colo-Colo	1 - 0	Cobresal	Estadio Monumental
21:00	Meléndez (yellow card) 33'; Fuenzalida (yellow card) 33'; Paredes (yellow card) 54'; Quiroga (yellow card) 55', (goal) 57'		(yellow card) 20' Farías; (yellow card) 38' Pineda; (yellow card) 52' Pérez; (yellow card) 59' Cabión	Referee: Eduardo Gamboa

November 28, 2010 Week 33	O'Higgins	2 - 1	Colo-Colo	Estadio El Teniente
16:00	Teuber 18'; Ojeda 55'	Report	Paredes 51'	Attendance: 12,168; Referee: Jorge Osorio

December 5, 2010 Week 34	Colo-Colo	4 - 2	Universidad de Concepción	Estadio Monumental
19:00	Miralles 12'; Cámpora 45', 52'; Rabello 51'	Report	64' Godoy; 84' Arraya	Attendance: 14,811; Referee: Pablo Pozo

==== Copa Libertadores ====
Group stage

16 February 2010 Match Day 1	Colo-Colo	1 - 0	Deportivo Italia	Estadio Monumental
19:00	Magalhaes (yellow card) 15'; Aránguiz (yellow card) 40'; Paredes 58', (yellow card) 90+2'; Bogado (yellow card) 62'; Scotti (yellow card) 83'		(yellow card) 25' Jiménez	Attendance: 25,000; Referee: Víctor Hugo Carrillo

24 February 2010 Match Day 2	Cruzeiro	4 - 1	Colo-Colo	Estadio Mineirão
19:30	Ribeiro 7', (yellow card) 45+1'; Henrique (yellow card) 55'; Kléber (p.k.) 61', 72'; Marquinhos Paraná (yellow card) 62'; Pedro Ken 69'		(yellow card) 17' (yellow-red card) 57' Olate; (yellow card) 29' Scotti; 37' Paredes; (yellow card) 52' (yellow-red card) 67' Cereceda; (yellow card) 67' Meléndez; (yellow card) 89' Sanhueza	Attendance: 50,000; Referee: Óscar Ruiz

16 March 2010 Match Day 3	Colo-Colo	1 - 1	Vélez Sársfield	Estadio Monumental
	Scotti (yellow card) 32'; Meléndez (yellow card) 33'; Paredes 57', (yellow card) 90+1'; Torres (yellow card) 64'; Miralles (yellow card) 87'		(yellow card) 15' (yellow-red card) 59' Zapata; (yellow card) 78', (goal) 90+2' Silva	Attendance: 25,000; Referee: Carlos Amarilla

25 March 2010 Match Day 4	Vélez Sársfield	2 - 1	Colo-Colo	Estadio José Amalfitani
	López 12'; Cubero (yellow card) 14'; Silva 28', (yellow card) 67'; Somoza (yellow card) 45'		8' Miralles; (yellow card) 31' Cereceda; (yellow card) 35' Aránguiz; (yellow card) 50' Meléndez; (yellow card) 55' Riffo; (yellow card) 83' (yellow-red card) 87' Millar	Referee: Roberto Silvera

6 April 2010 Match Day 5	Deportivo Italia	2 - 3	Colo-Colo	Estadio Olímpico
19:15	Panigutti 15'; Urdaneta (yellow card) 22'; López (yellow card) 72'; Blanco (p.k.) 86'		(yellow card) 9' Scotti; (yellow card) 20' Meléndez; 25' Bogado; 37', 58' Miralles	Attendance: 3,000; Referee: Marco Rodríguez

15 April 2010 Match Day 6	Colo-Colo	1 - 1	Cruzeiro	Estadio Monumental
20:50	Aránguiz (yellow card) 30'; Miralles (yellow card) 34'; Millar 60'; Toro (yellow card) 70'; Meléndez (yellow card) 75'; Scotti (red card) 80'		(yellow card) 30' Gil; (yellow card) 34' Silva; 57' Ribeiro	Referee: Carlos Torres

==== Copa Chile ====
First round

13 May 2010 Match Day 1	Curicó Unido	4 - 2	Colo-Colo	Santa Laura-Universidad SEK
22:00	Gutiérrez 51', 53'; Brizuela 65'; Díaz 68'; Rubortone (yellow card) 80'; Vásquez (yellow card) 85'		2', 29' Graf; (yellow card) 50' Sanhueza; (yellow card) 57' Olate	Referee: Claudio Fuenzalida

20 May 2010 Match Day 2	Colo-Colo	5 - 0 (3 – 4 p)	Curicó Unido	Estadio Monumental
	Riffo 13'; Miralles 28', (yellow card); Bogado 36'; Graf 42'; Torres 52'; Sanhueza (yellow card)		(yellow card) Olivares	Attendance: 5,000; Referee: Eduardo Ponce
	Penalties
	Miralles (penalty scored); Graf (penalty scored); Bogado (penalty missed); Torres (penalty missed); Quiroga (penalty scored)		(penalty scored) Gutiérrez; (penalty scored) Úbeda; (penalty missed) Ortega; (penalty scored) Pérez; (penalty scored) Díaz

3 - 3 on points. Curicó won 4 - 3 on penalties

==== Copa Sudamericana ====
First round

17 August 2010 Match Day 1	Universitario de Sucre	2 - 0	Colo-Colo	Estadio Olímpico Patria
20:00	Galindo 58'; Lima 80'		(yellow card) 18' Toro; (yellow card) 83' Riffo

25 August 2010 Match Day 2	Colo-Colo	3 - 1	Universitario de Sucre	Estadio Monumental
20:30	Fuenzalida (yellow card) 30', (goal) 66'; Cámpora 37', 52'; Meléndez (yellow card) 47'; Rabello (yellow card) 60'; Carrasco (yellow card) 68'; Millar (yellow card) 90'		(yellow card) 39' Michel; 44' Galindo; (yellow card) 62' Melgar

3 - 3 on global. Universitario Sucre won on away goals

== See also ==
- Colo-Colo
