= 2007 Copa América Group B =

Football tournament group stage

Group B of the 2007 Copa América was one of the three groups of competing nations in the 2007 Copa América. It comprised Brazil, Chile, Ecuador, and invitee Mexico. The group matches ran from 27 June to 4 July 2007.

Mexico, Brazil and Chile advanced from the group to the knockout phase.

== Standings ==
Team	Pld	W	D	L	GF	GA	GD	Pts
Mexico	3	2	1	0	4	1	+3	7
Brazil	3	2	0	1	4	2	+2	6
Chile	3	1	1	1	3	5	−2	4
Ecuador	3	0	0	3	3	6	−3	0

== Matches ==
All times are in local, Venezuela Time (UTC−04:00).

=== Ecuador v Chile ===
27 June 2007
18:35

Ecuador	2–3	Chile
Valencia 16'; Benítez 23'	Report	Suazo 20', 80'; Villanueva 86'

Polideportivo Cachamay, Ciudad Guayana
Attendance: 35,000
Referee: Óscar Ruiz (Colombia)

Ecuador	Chile

GK	12	Cristian Mora
RB	4	Ulises de la Cruz	(yellow card) 14'
CB	3	Iván Hurtado (c)
CB	17	Giovanny Espinoza
LB	15	Óscar Bagüí
RM	16	Antonio Valencia
CM	14	Segundo Castillo
CM	20	Edwin Tenorio
LM	8	Édison Méndez	(yellow card) 77'
FW	11	Christian Benítez
FW	21	Carlos Tenorio	(yellow card) 44'	(substituted off) 75'
Substitutions:
FW	10	Felipe Caicedo		(substituted on) 75'
Manager:
(Colombia) Luis Fernando Suárez

GK	1	Claudio Bravo
CB	2	Álvaro Ormeño
CB	13	Jorge Vargas	(yellow card) 13'
CB	15	Pablo Contreras
RW	11	Mark González
DM	17	Arturo Sanhueza
DM	18	Rodrigo Meléndez		(substituted off) 73'
AM	10	Jorge Valdivia (c)
LW	14	Matías Fernández		(substituted off) 46'
FW	8	Humberto Suazo
FW	9	Reinaldo Navia		(substituted off) 46'
Substitutions:
DF	5	Miguel Riffo		(substituted on) 46'
FW	22	Juan Gonzalo Lorca		(substituted on) 46'
MF	21	Carlos Villanueva		(substituted on) 73'
Manager:
(Uruguay) Nelson Acosta

=== Brazil v Mexico ===
27 June 2007
20:50

Brazil	0–2	Mexico
	Report	Castillo 23'; Morales 28'

Polideportivo Cachamay, Ciudad Guayana
Attendance: 40,000
Referee: Sergio Pezzotta (Argentina)

Brazil	Mexico

GK	12	Doni
RB	2	Maicon		(substituted off) 78'
CB	3	Alex	(yellow card) 60'
CB	4	Juan
LB	6	Gilberto
DM	5	Mineiro
DM	8	Gilberto Silva (c)
AM	7	Elano		(substituted off) 46'
AM	10	Diego		(substituted off) 46'
SS	11	Robinho
CF	9	Vágner Love
Substitutions:
MF	20	Anderson		(substituted on) 46'
FW	21	Afonso Alves	(yellow card) 66'	(substituted on) 46'
DF	13	Dani Alves	(yellow card) 83'	(substituted on) 78'
Manager:
Dunga

GK	13	Guillermo Ochoa
RB	8	Jaime Correa
CB	2	Jonny Magallón
CB	4	Rafael Márquez (c)
LB	6	Gerardo Torrado
RM	21	Nery Castillo	(yellow card) 56'
CM	20	Fernando Arce
CM	5	Israel Castro		(substituted off) 74'
LM	3	Fausto Pinto
SS	11	Ramón Morales		(substituted off) 78'
CF	12	Juan Carlos Cacho		(substituted off) 69'
Substitutions:
FW	19	Omar Bravo		(substituted on) 69'
DF	15	José Antonio Castro		(substituted on) 74'
MF	16	Jaime Lozano		(substituted on) 78'
Manager:
Hugo Sánchez

=== Brazil v Chile ===
1 July 2007
16:05

Brazil	3–0	Chile
Robinho 36' (pen.), 84', 87'	Report

Estadio Monumental de Maturín, Maturín
Attendance: 52,000
Referee: Carlos Torres (Paraguay)

Brazil	Chile

GK	12	Doni
RB	5	Mineiro	(yellow card) 47'
CB	3	Alex
CB	4	Juan
LB	6	Gilberto	(yellow card) 41'
CM	8	Gilberto Silva (c)
CM	20	Anderson		(substituted off) 46'
RW	2	Maicon		(substituted off) 19'
AM	7	Elano	(yellow card) 77'	(substituted off) 77'
LW	11	Robinho	(yellow card) 64'
CF	9	Vágner Love
Substitutions:
DF	13	Dani Alves		(substituted on) 19'
MF	19	Júlio Baptista		(substituted on) 46'
MF	17	Josué		(substituted on) 77'
Manager:
Dunga

GK	1	Claudio Bravo
RB	2	Álvaro Ormeño
CB	4	Ismael Fuentes
CB	5	Miguel Riffo		(substituted off) 54'
CB	19	Gonzalo Jara	(yellow card) 24'	(substituted off) 46'
LB	15	Pablo Contreras	(yellow card) 82'
RM	17	Arturo Sanhueza
CM	18	Rodrigo Meléndez		(substituted off) 19'
CM	10	Jorge Valdivia (c)
LM	11	Mark González
CF	8	Humberto Suazo	(yellow card) 30'
Substitutions:
MF	16	Manuel Iturra	(yellow card) 79'	(substituted on) 19'
FW	22	Juan Gonzalo Lorca		(substituted on) 46'
DF	13	Jorge Vargas	(yellow card) 39'	(substituted on) 54'
Manager:
(Uruguay) Nelson Acosta

=== Mexico v Ecuador ===
1 July 2007
18:20

Mexico	2–1	Ecuador
Castillo 21'; Bravo 79'	Report	Méndez 84'

Estadio Monumental de Maturín, Maturín
Attendance: 52,000
Referee: René Ortubé (Bolivia)

Mexico	Ecuador

GK	1	Oswaldo Sánchez
RB	2	Jonny Magallón
CB	5	Israel Castro
CB	4	Rafael Márquez (c)
LB	3	Fausto Pinto
RM	20	Fernando Arce
CM	8	Jaime Correa
CM	6	Gerardo Torrado
LM	11	Ramón Morales	(substituted off) 83'
FW	12	Juan Carlos Cacho	(substituted off) 64'
FW	21	Nery Castillo	(substituted off) 78'
Substitutions:
FW	19	Omar Bravo	(substituted on) 64'
FW	10	Cuauhtémoc Blanco	(substituted on) 78'
DF	14	Gonzalo Pineda	(substituted on) 83'
Manager:
Hugo Sánchez

GK	12	Cristian Mora
RB	4	Ulises de la Cruz
CB	3	Iván Hurtado (c)	(yellow card) 24'
CB	17	Giovanny Espinoza
LB	15	Óscar Bagüí		(substituted off) 71'
LM	8	Édison Méndez
CM	14	Segundo Castillo
CM	20	Edwin Tenorio		(substituted off) 46'
RM	16	Antonio Valencia
FW	11	Christian Benítez
FW	21	Carlos Tenorio		(substituted off) 78'
Substitutions:
DF	18	Néicer Reasco		(substituted on) 46'
DF	19	Walter Ayoví		(substituted on) 71'
FW	9	Félix Borja		(substituted on) 78'
Manager:
(Colombia) Luis Fernando Suárez

=== Mexico v Chile ===
4 July 2007
18:35

Mexico	0–0	Chile
	Report

Estadio Olímpico Luis Ramos, Puerto la Cruz
Attendance: 38,000
Referee: Carlos Amarilla (Paraguay)

Mexico	Chile

GK	13	Guillermo Ochoa
RB	15	José Antonio Castro
CB	2	Jonny Magallón
CB	22	Francisco Rodríguez
LB	14	Gonzalo Pineda	(yellow card) 76'	(substituted off) 81'
DM	8	Jaime Correa
RM	7	Alberto Medina
CM	18	Andrés Guardado	(yellow card) 42'	(substituted off) 46'
LM	16	Jaime Lozano
CF	19	Omar Bravo	(yellow card) 54'	(substituted off) 74'
CF	10	Cuauhtémoc Blanco (c)
Substitutions:
FW	17	Adolfo Bautista		(substituted on) 46'
FW	9	Luis Ángel Landín		(substituted on) 74'
MF	20	Fernando Arce		(substituted on) 81'
Manager:
Hugo Sánchez

GK	1	Claudio Bravo
RB	20	Gonzalo Fierro	(yellow card) 2'
CB	3	Sebastián Roco	(yellow card) 47'
CB	4	Ismael Fuentes
LB	15	Pablo Contreras
RM	17	Arturo Sanhueza (c)
CM	16	Manuel Iturra
CM	21	Carlos Villanueva		(substituted off) 70'
LM	7	Rodrigo Tello
FW	22	Juan Gonzalo Lorca		(substituted off) 77'
FW	8	Humberto Suazo
Substitutions:
MF	14	Matías Fernández		(substituted on) 70'
FW	11	Mark González		(substituted on) 77'
Manager:
(Uruguay) Nelson Acosta

=== Brazil v Ecuador ===
4 July 2007
20:50

Brazil	1–0	Ecuador
Robinho 56' (pen.)	Report

Estadio Olímpico Luis Ramos, Puerto la Cruz
Attendance: 38,000
Referee: Sergio Pezzotta (Argentina)

Brazil	Ecuador

GK	12	Doni
RB	13	Dani Alves	(yellow card) 59'	(substituted off) 80'
CB	3	Alex
CB	4	Juan
LB	6	Gilberto		(substituted off) 58'
CM	5	Mineiro
CM	8	Gilberto Silva (c)
CM	17	Josué	(yellow card) 90+3'
RF	19	Júlio Baptista		(substituted off) 73'
CF	9	Vágner Love
LF	11	Robinho
Substitutions:
DF	16	Kléber		(substituted on) 58'
MF	10	Diego	(yellow card) 77'	(substituted on) 73'
DF	14	Alex Silva		(substituted on) 80'
Manager:
Dunga

GK	1	Marcelo Elizaga
RB	18	Néicer Reasco
CB	2	Jorge Guagua
CB	17	Giovanny Espinoza
LB	15	Óscar Bagüí	(yellow card) 68'
RM	8	Édison Méndez (c)
CM	14	Segundo Castillo
CM	16	Antonio Valencia
LM	19	Walter Ayoví		(substituted off) 76'
FW	9	Félix Borja		(substituted off) 60'
FW	11	Christian Benítez
Substitutions:
FW	21	Carlos Tenorio	(yellow card) 78'	(substituted on) 60'
FW	10	Felipe Caicedo		(substituted on) 76'
Manager:
(Colombia) Luis Fernando Suárez
