= Olguin =

Olguin or Olguín is a surname in the Spanish speaking world. Notable people with the surname include:

- Adriana Olguín (1911–2015), Chilean lawyer and politician
- Carlos Olguin-Trelawny, Argentine film director and screenwriter
- Cristián Olguín (born 1963), Chilean footballer
- Felipe Solís Olguín (1944–2009), Mexican archaeologist, anthropologist and historian
- Fernando M. Olguin (born 1961), American judge
- Héctor Pedraza Olguín (born 1966), Mexican politician
- Jorge Olguín (born 1952), Argentine footballer
- Jorge Olguín (director) (born 1973/1974), Chilean film director
- José Olguín (footballer) (1903–1991), Chilean footballer
- José Olguín (water polo) (1926–1998), Mexican water polo player
- Leonardo Olguín (born 1975), Argentine tennis player
- Luciano Olguín (born 1982), Argentine footballer
- Néstor Olguín (born 1988), Mexican footballer
- Otilio Olguín (born 1931), Mexican swimmer and water polo player
- Roy Argel Gómez Olguín (born 1973), Mexican politician
- Sergio Olguín (born 1967), Argentinean author, journalist and literary critic
