= Casarin =

Casarin is a surname. Notable people with this surname include:

- Carlos Escobar Casarin (born 1990), Chilean footballer
- Davide Casarin (born 2003), Italian basketball player
- Paolo Casarin (born 1940), Italian former football referee
- Vittorio Casarin (born 1950), Italian politician from Veneto

== See also ==
- Horacio Casarín Garcilazo (1918–2005), Mexican football player and coach
- Casarini
