= Ricardo Guzmán Millas =

Chilean politician (born 1979)

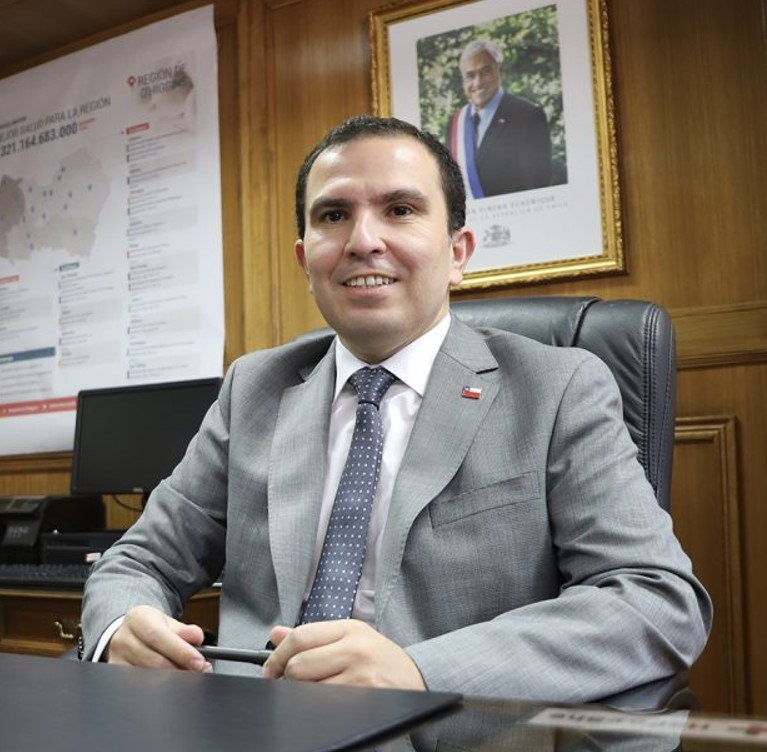

Presidential Delegate to the O'Higgins Region
- In office 14 July 2021 – 11 March 2022
- President: Sebastián Piñera
- Preceded by: Creation of the charge
- Succeeded by: Fabio López Aguilera

Personal details
- Born: 4 June 1979 (age 47) Rancagua, Chile
- Party: Independent Democratic Union
- Education: University of the Americas (LLB)
- Occupation: Politician
- Profession: Lawyer

Ricardo Gumzán Millas (born 4 June 1979) is a Chilean politician who served in the Chamber of Deputies of Chile.

== Early life ==
Guzmán Millas was born on 4 June 1979. He studied at the Regional Institute of Education (IRE) of Rancagua, from where he graduated in 1996. His Law studies were carried out at the University of the Americas.

== Political career ==
During Sebastián Piñera's first government, he held the position of regional director of the INJUV O'Higgins. In 2011, he assumed the position of councilmen in the Municipality of Rancagua, replacing Pamela Medina. Then, Guzmán was re-elected twice. He remained in office until November 2020, when he resigned with the goal to win the next regional councilor elections. Nevertheless, he finally stepped aside of the race.

On 15 February 2021, President Sebastián Piñera appointed Guzmán Millas as the new Intendant of the O'Higgins Region, replacing Rebeca Cofré.
