= Sebastián Toro =

Chilean footballer (born 1990)

Personal information
- Full name: Sebastián Patricio Toro Hormazábal
- Date of birth: 2 February 1990 (age 36)
- Place of birth: Santiago, Chile
- Height: 1.78 m (5 ft 10 in)
- Position: Centre-back

Youth career
- Colo-Colo

Senior career*
Years	Team	Apps	(Gls)
2009–2016	Colo-Colo	66	(1)
2012	→ Deportes Iquique (loan)	31	(0)
2013	Colo-Colo B	3	(0)
2015	→ Deportes Iquique (loan)	6	(0)
2015–2016	→ Ñublense (loan)	24	(0)
2016	Junior	8	(0)
2017	Palestino	8	(0)
2018–2019	KF Laçi	23	(0)
2020	Deportes Colina	9	(0)
2021	Unión San Felipe	1	(0)
2024	Santiago City	7	(0)
Total		186	(1)

International career
2010–2012	Chile	5	(1)
- * Club domestic league appearances and goals

Sebastián Patricio Toro Hormazábal (born 2 February 1990) is a Chilean former footballer. A central defender, he could also play as a full back.

== Career ==
He started in Colo-Colo's first team when Miguel Riffo and Luis Mena were injured and there were no other replacements. Since then he has become a member of the starting squad. He was registered for play accompanying Colo-Colo in the 2010 Copa Libertadores with the shirt Nº8.

After two years outside of football, Toro returned to play in 2024 by signing with Santiago City FC in the Chilean Tercera A.

== International goals ==
#	Date	Venue	Opponent	Score	Result	Competition
1.	5 May 2010	Estadio Tierra de Campeones, Iquique, Chile	Trinidad and Tobago	2–0	2–0	Friendly

== Post-retirement ==
After playing for Santiago City in 2024, Toro assumed as the sport manager.

In June 2025, Toro became the owner and chairman of Iberia.

== Honours ==
Colo-Colo

- Chilean Primera División (3): 2008 Clausura, 2009 Clausura, 2014 Clausura
