= Matías Quiroga =

Matías Quiroga may refer to:

- Matías Alejandro Quiroga (born April 1986), football centre forward for Club Atlético Patronato
- Matías Leonel Quiroga (born January 1986), football midfielder for Sarmiento de Resistencia
