= José Olguín =

José Olguín can refer to:

- José Olguín (footballer), Chilean Olympic footballer
- José Olguín (water polo) (born 1926), Mexican Olympic water polo player
