= Universidad de las Américas =

Universidad de las Américas (University of the Americas) may refer to:

- Universidad de las Américas, A.C., a bilingual university in Mexico City, Mexico.
- Universidad de las Américas Puebla, a Mexican private university in San Andrés Cholula, near Puebla
- Universidad de las Américas, Spanish name for University of the Americas (Chile), a private university based in Santiago
- Universidad de las Américas, Spanish name for University of the Americas (Nicaragua), a private university based in Managua
- Universidad de las Américas (Ecuador), a private university based in Quito.
