= Guillermo Pacheco =

Guillermo Pacheco may refer to:

- Guillermo Pacheco Bornacelli, Colombian prelate, head of the Venezuelan Catholic Apostolic Church
- Guillermo Pacheco (footballer) (born 1989), Chilean footballer
- Guillermo Pacheco Pulido (born 1933), Mexican politician from Puebla
- Guillermo Pacheco (swimmer) (born 1954), Peruvian Olympic swimmer
