= Andrés Scotti =

Uruguayan footballer (born 1975)

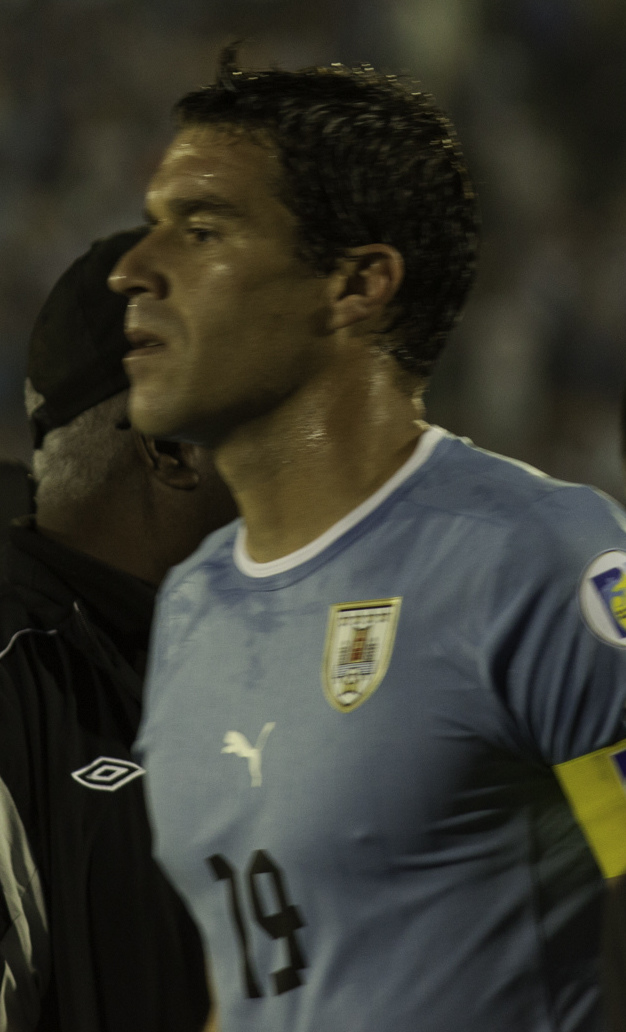
- Scotti with Uruguay in 2013

Personal information
- Full name: Andrés Scotti Ponce de León
- Date of birth: 14 December 1975 (age 50)
- Place of birth: Montevideo, Uruguay
- Height: 1.83 m (6 ft 0 in)
- Position: Centre back

Youth career
- 1993–1996: Independiente de Flores

Senior career*
Years	Team	Apps	(Gls)
1997	Montevideo Wanderers	12	(1)
1998–1999	Huachipato	52	(6)
2000	Necaxa	34	(4)
2000	Puebla	17	(0)
2001	Montevideo Wanderers	38	(3)
2002	Nacional	33	(5)
2003–2006	Rubin Kazan	108	(12)
2007–2009	Argentinos Juniors	78	(3)
2010–2011	Colo-Colo	47	(7)
2012–2014	Nacional	46	(6)
2014–2015	Defensor Sporting	23	(1)
Total		488	(48)

International career
2006–2013	Uruguay	40	(1)
Medal record
Representing Uruguay
Copa América
Winner	2011 Argentina	Team
- * Club domestic league appearances and goals

Andrés Scotti Ponce de León (born 14 December 1975) is a Uruguayan former professional footballer who played as centre-back and rarely as left-back. Between 2006 and 2013, he made 40 appearances and scored one goal for the Uruguay national team.

== Club career ==
=== Early career ===
Scotti was born in Montevideo, but grew up in Trinidad, the capital of Flores Department. He started his career playing football for the local village team Independiente in 1993, when he was between 17 and 18 years old. Scotti won the regional tournament title in his second season with Independiente in 1994. After three seasons at Independiente, in 1997 he joined Central Español on trial. He spent only three months there before leaving for Montevideo Wanderers. At that club, Scotti played 12 games and scored one goal for the club during the Uruguayan first division tournament of that year.

In 1998, Scotti played for his first international club, the Chilean Primera División team Huachipato, where Scotti had a good spell, for example, having much continuity, scoring goals and being elected the best player of the tournament in his position. He remained until the next season, when he was transferred to the Mexican club Necaxa. There, he achieved third place FIFA Club World Championship 2000, after winning 4–3 on penalties against Real Madrid. In 2001, he returned to Uruguay to play again for Montevideo Wanderers. In 2002, he was transferred to Nacional, winning the Torneo Apertura and the Campeonato Uruguayo, scoring a goal in the second final game.

=== Russia and Argentina ===
He then moved to Russia in 2003, where he played for FC Rubin Kazan in the Russian Premier League until December 2006.

In January 2007, Scotti joined Argentine Primera División side Argentinos Juniors, on request of the team's coach Ricardo Caruso Lombardi.

=== Colo-Colo ===
On 31 December 2009, it was announced that Scotti had come to a verbal agreement with Colo-Colo for an undisclosed fee. He put pen to paper on a one-year deal and joined Santiago club before New Year's Day alongside Argentinian Matías Quiroga. After overcoming medical examinations and training he made his debut on 15 January 2010, in a friendly against Olimpia which Colo-Colo drew 3–3. His league debut came on 23 January, in a 3–2 loss against Unión San Felipe and his first goal for the club was in a 3–0 home victory over Palestino after an excellent free kick. Then, on 8 May, Scotti scored his second league goal in a 5–2 win to Cobresal, his goal being voted the week's best according to CDF's top five weekly summary of goals.

After the World Cup held in South Africa (which Scotti played with Uruguay national team), he began to lose his shape, so that Diego Cagna (the club's coach) relegated him to some games to the detriment of Miguel Riffo. On 7 November, Scotti played in the 2–2 Chilean derby draw with Universidad de Chile, where he was sent off after a double yellow card following a challenge with adversary team striker Carlos Bueno.

However Colo-Colo lost the race for the title with Universidad Católica in the penultimate matchday after a seven-point lead over San Carlos team, which finished when Scotti's side lost 2–1 with O'Higgins and Católica won simultaneously 3–2 over Cobreloa at Calama.

== International career ==
Scotti played for Uruguay in Copa América 2007 and in the FIFA World Cup 2010, where he scored a penalty in the shootout against Ghana. In 2011, he won the Copa América, a tournament where he scored a penalty in the shootout against Argentina in the quarterfinals. On 27 July 2010, he was reserved to play a friendly match against Angola in Lisbon.

On 23 June 2013, Scotti played against Tahiti in the 2013 Confederations Cup and missed a penalty at the 49th minute. Two minutes later, he was sent off when he was shown a second yellow card. Uruguay went on to win the match 8–0.

He was a standby player for Uruguay in the FIFA World Cup 2014 in Brazil.

== AUF normalisation committee ==
On 21 August 2018, FIFA appointed a normalisation committee for the Uruguayan Football Association (AUF). Three persons were put in charge: politicians Pedro Bordaberry (son of former dictator Juan María Bordaberry) and Armando Castaingdebat, and Scotti.

== Personal life ==
Andrés was raised in Trinidad, the capital of Flores Department; he is the oldest son of María Cecilia Ponce de León and Carlos Scotti. He has one younger brother, Diego, who is also a footballer and plays for Unión Española in the Chilean Primera División. He has two other sisters; one lives in Luxembourg and the other in Uruguay.

== Career statistics ==
=== International ===
Appearances and goals by national team and year
National team	Year	Apps	Goals
Uruguay	2006	7	0
Uruguay	2007	10	0
Uruguay	2008	2	0
Uruguay	2009	5	1
Uruguay	2010	7	0
Uruguay	2011	4	0
Uruguay	2012	2	0
Uruguay	2013	3	0
Total		40	1

=== International goals ===
Goal	Date	Venue	Opponent	Score	Result	Competition
1.	9 September 2009	Estadio Centenario, Montevideo, Uruguay	Colombia	2–1	3–1	2010 FIFA World Cup qualification

== Honours ==
=== Club ===
Necaxa

- FIFA Club World Cup: third place 2000

Nacional

- Uruguayan Primera División: 2002, 2011–12

=== International ===
Uruguay

- Copa América: 2011
- FIFA World Cup: 2010 (fourth place)
