= Fernando Meneses =

Chilean footballer (born 1985)

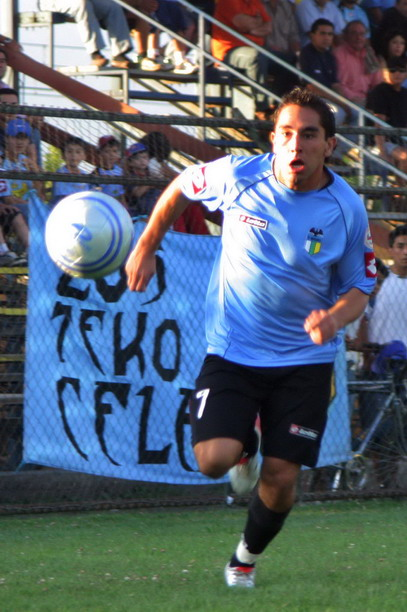

Personal information
- Full name: Fernando Andrés Meneses Cornejo
- Date of birth: 27 September 1985 (age 41)
- Place of birth: Molina, Chile
- Height: 1.74 m (5 ft 9 in)
- Position: Midfielder

Youth career
- 1997–2004: Colo-Colo

Senior career*
Years	Team	Apps	(Gls)
2004–2009	Colo-Colo	16	(0)
2006–2007	→ O'Higgins (loan)	33	(2)
2007	→ Cobreloa (loan)	13	(0)
2008	→ Universidad de Concepción (loan)	17	(2)
2009	→ O'Higgins (loan)	28	(7)
2010–2011	Universidad Católica	84	(12)
2012	Alianza Lima	11	(1)
2012–2014	Universidad Católica	53	(5)
2015–2017	Veracruz	59	(2)
2017	→ Unión Española (loan)	27	(1)
2018	Unión La Calera	7	(0)
2018–2021	Deportes Melipilla	30	(6)
2020	→ Lautaro de Buin (loan)	5	(0)
2021	Rodelindo Román	14	(2)

International career
2005	Chile U20	9	(1)
2008	Chile U23	5	(0)
2008–2016	Chile	16	(1)
- * Club domestic league appearances and goals

Fernando Andrés Meneses Cornejo (born 27 September 1985) is a Chilean former footballer who played as a midfielder.

== Football career ==
In 2004, he debuted in Colo-Colo. In those years, he also studied a technical-professional career in physical activity at the University of the Americas, where also was classmate of his teammates Claudio Bravo, Luis Mena and Miguel Riffo.

== International career ==
He was a part of the 2005 FIFA World Youth Championship with Chile. He wore jersey number seven. Since then he has been called up to the adult squad for friendlies.

In May 2008, Meneses took part in the 2008 Toulon Tournament with Chile and played in all five games.

He was named in the preliminary squad for the 2015 Copa America but was omitted from the final squad.

In 2021, he played for Chilean Segunda División side Rodelindo Román.

=== International goals ===
Goal	Date	Venue	Opponent	Score	Result	Competition
1	15 January 2013	Estadio La Portada, La Serena, Chile	Senegal	2–1	2–1	Friendly

== Personal life ==
His son, Joaquín, is a youth footballer from the Universidad Católica youth ranks who has taken part of the Chile national youth teams.

== Post-retirement ==
In July 2023, Meneses joined the amateur club Deportivo Viña Rosario from Peumo, alongside the also former professional footballer Roberto Ávalos.

== Honours ==
=== Club ===
Colo-Colo

- Primera División de Chile (2): 2006 Apertura, 2006 Clausura

Universidad Católica

- Primera División de Chile (1): 2010
- Copa Chile (1): 2011

Veracruz

- Copa MX: Clausura 2016
