= Roberto Ávalos =

Chilean footballer (born 1980)

Personal information
- Full name: Roberto Carlos Ávalos Pino
- Date of birth: 16 June 1980 (age 46)
- Place of birth: Santiago, Chile
- Height: 1.67 m (5 ft 6 in)
- Position: Midfielder

Youth career
- Palestino

Senior career*
Years	Team	Apps	(Gls)
1997–2002	Palestino	2	(0)
2003	San Luis	–	(–)
2007–2013	Palestino	149	(1)
2014	Unión La Calera	20	(0)
2015	Everton	12	(0)
2015–2016	Palestino	1	(0)
Total		184	(1)
- * Club domestic league appearances and goals

Roberto Carlos Ávalos Pino (born 16 June 1980) is a former Chilean footballer who played as midfielder.

== Personal life ==
Ávalos stopped his career for about four years because he was in prison for drug trafficking.

== Post-retirement ==
In July 2023, Ávalos joined the amateur club Deportivo Viña Rosario from Peumo alongside former professional footballer Fernando Meneses.
