= Casarini =

Casarini is a surname. Notable people with the surname include:

- Andrea Casarini (born 1994), Italian footballer
- Federico Casarini (born 1989), Italian footballer
- Luca Casarini, Italian activist
- Camillo Casarini (1830–1874), Italian politician

== See also ==
- 6364 Casarini, main-belt asteroid
