= José Antonio Rojas =

Chilean footballer (born 1987)

Personal information
- Full name: José Antonio Rojas Barrera
- Date of birth: 13 January 1987 (age 39)
- Place of birth: Quillota, Chile
- Height: 1.86 m (6 ft 1 in)
- Position: Centre-back

Senior career*
Years	Team	Apps	(Gls)
2003–2009	Unión La Calera	161	(7)
2010	Everton	3	(0)
2010	Deportes Antofagasta	16	(0)
2011	Deportes Puerto Montt	26	(1)
2012–2017	Ñublense	152	(7)
2013	Ñublense B	1	(0)
2018	Deportes La Serena	12	(0)
2019	Deportes Santa Cruz	23	(1)
2020–2021	Deportes Concepción	21	(0)
2022–2023	Deportivo La Higuera		
Total		415	(16)
- * Club domestic league appearances and goals

José Antonio Rojas Barrera (born 13 January 1987) is a Chilean former footballer who played as a centre-back.

== Career ==
Rojas began playing football for Unión La Calera in 2003. The defender joined Chilean Primera División side Everton de Viña del Mar at age 23.

In 2022, he signed with Deportivo La Higuera.

At international level, Rojas was part of a Chile under-25 squad in a training session led by Claudio Borghi in May 2011, alongside his teammate in Deportes Puerto Montt, Ignacio González.
