= Nicolás Altamirano =

Chilean footballer (born 1990)

Personal information
- Full name: Nikolás Maximiliano Altamirano Acuña
- Date of birth: 1 April 1990 (age 36)
- Place of birth: Temuco, Chile
- Height: 1.70 m (5 ft 7 in)
- Position: Attacking midfielder

Youth career
- 2005–2006: Deportes Temuco

Senior career*
Years	Team	Apps	(Gls)
2007–2014	Unión Española	5	(0)
2011	→ Deportes Copiapó (loan)	20	(6)
2012	→ Ñublense (loan)	24	(1)
2013	→ Unión Temuco (loan)	5	(2)
2013–2014	→ Deportes Temuco (loan)	9	(0)
2014–2015	Magallanes	19	(2)
2015–2016	Malleco Unido	13	(0)
Total		95	(11)
- * Club domestic league appearances and goals

Nikolás Maximiliano Altamirano Acuña (Spanish pronunciation: [nikoˈlas altaˈmiɾano], born 1 April 1990), usually named Nicolás Altamirano, is a Chilean former footballer who played as an attacking midfielder.

== Personal life ==
His nickname is Niko.

He and his teammate in Magallanes, Nelson Cereceda, had a serious traffic accident while they went to train to San Bernardo in August 2014. Cereceda suffered a TBI with no aftereffects.

Outside of football, he is a go-kart racing driver.

== Honours ==
Ñublense

- Primera B: 2012
