= Luis Mena (Chilean footballer) =

Chilean footballer (born 1979)

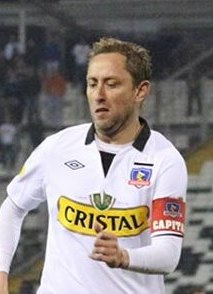
- Mena with Colo-Colo in 2013

Personal information
- Full name: Luis Arturo Mena Irarrázabal
- Date of birth: 28 August 1979 (age 47)
- Place of birth: Puente Alto, Santiago, Chile
- Height: 1.78 m (5 ft 10 in)
- Position: Centre back

Team information
- Current team: Chile (women) (manager)

Youth career
- Colo-Colo

Senior career*
Years	Team	Apps	(Gls)
1996–2014	Colo-Colo	322	(7)
2001	→ Deportes Puerto Montt (loan)	21	(0)
Total		343	(7)

International career
1998–1999	Chile U20		
1999	Chile	1	(0)

Managerial career
- Colo-Colo (youth)
- 2021-2023: Colo-Colo (women)
- 2023-: Chile (women)
- 2024: Chile U20 (women)
- * Club domestic league appearances and goals

Luis Arturo Mena Irarrázabal (born 28 August 1979) is a retired Chilean professional footballer. He is the only player in Chilean football history to win more than 10 domestic league titles. He also holds more than 300 appearances for Colo-Colo, with seven goals. Because of this, Mena has been dubbed by Chilean press and Colo Colo fans as the "historic one" (el historico).

== Football career ==
Mena made his professional debut with Colo-Colo on November 26, 1996, in the final of the Copa Chile against Rangers. He has spent his entire career, except one year when he was playing on loan at Puerto Montt, playing with Colo-Colo as a defender.

In the 2000s, and whilst he was playing for Colo-Colo, he also studied a technical-professional career in physical activity at the University of the Americas, where also was classmate of his teammates Claudio Bravo, Fernando Meneses and Miguel Riffo.

Mena was the captain of the Under-20 Chile national team between 1998 and 1999, also winning the L'Alcúdia Tournament in 1998. He has been described as "not the flashiest or talented footballer", but Mena is known for his loyalty to Colo-Colo and his calm leadership on the field.

== Managing career ==
Mena started his career at the Colo-Colo youth ranks and later became the interim head coach for Colo-Colo women in January 2021, replacing Vanessa Arauz. On 24 February 2021, he was officially appointed as the head coach.

In May 2023, Mena was appointed the manager of the Chile women's national team. In 2024, he also led the under's 20 in the South American Championship.

== Honours ==
Colo-Colo

- Primera División de Chile (11): 1996, 1997–C, 1998, 2002–C, 2006–A, 2006–C, 2007–A, 2007–C, 2008–C, 2009–C, 2014–C
- Copa Chile: 1996

Chile U20

- L'Alcúdia International Tournament (1): 1998
