= Milton Erick Melgar =

Bolivian footballer (born 1986)

Personal information
- Full name: Milton Erick Melgar Cuéllar
- Date of birth: November 20, 1986 (age 39)
- Place of birth: Santa Cruz de la Sierra, Bolivia
- Height: 1.79 m (5 ft 10 in)
- Position: Midfielder

Youth career
- 2003–2004: Deportivo Cooper

Senior career*
Years	Team	Apps	(Gls)
2005	Aurora		(1)
2006	Oriente Petrolero	11	(0)
2007	Carabobo FC	14	(0)
2007	Oriente Petrolero	15	(0)
2008	Bolívar	13	(0)
2009	Deportivo Anzoátegui	22	(1)
2009–2010	Rio Branco	27	(1)
2010–2012	Universitario de Sucre	60	(2)
2012–2013	Real Potosí	18	(1)

International career
2003	Bolivia U-17	3	(0)
- * Club domestic league appearances and goals as of January 16, 2012

Milton Erick Melgar Cuéllar (born November 20, 1986, in Santa Cruz de la Sierra) is a Bolivian football midfielder. He currently plays for Universitario de Sucre in Bolivia.

== Club career ==
Melgar started out at second division club Deportivo Cooper. In 2005, he made his flight top debut with Aurora. In that season, he played in 7 games scoring one goal. The following year he transferred to hometown club Oriente Petrolero, but his appearances during this period were limited as he spent most of the time on the bench. In 2007, he went abroad to play for Venezuelan side Carabobo FC, but shortly after he returned to Oriente where he stayed for the remaining of that year. Subsequently Bolívar signed him for the 2008 season, but the slim opportunities he was given to exposed himself on the field discouraged his continuance in the club. In 2009, he returned to Venezuela and joined Deportivo Anzoátegui.

== Personal life ==
He is the eldest son of legendary Bolivian midfielder José Milton Melgar, who played for the Bolivia national team in the 1994 FIFA World Cup.
