= Ignacio González (footballer, born 1989) =

Chilean footballer

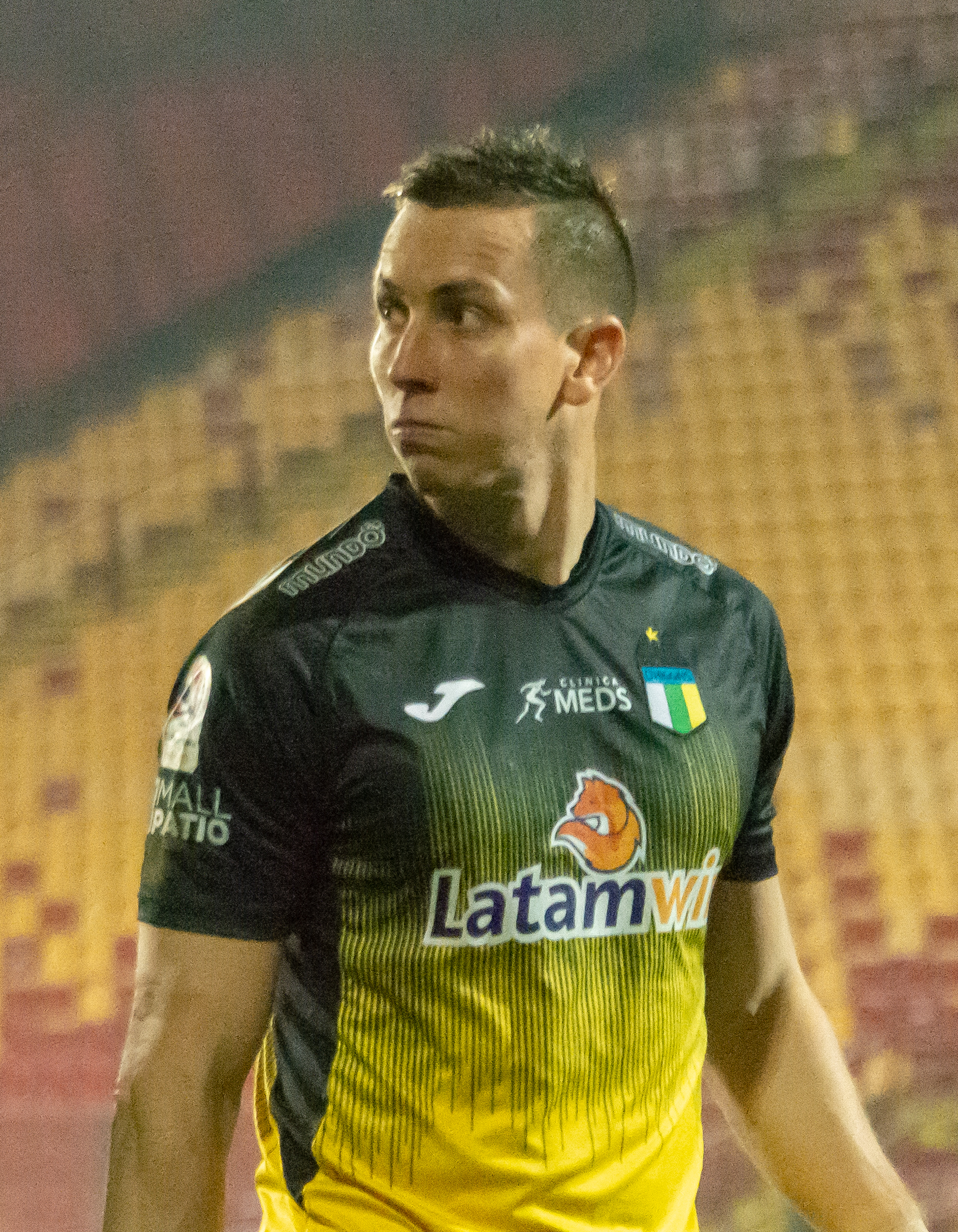
- González with O'Higgins in 2023

Personal information
- Full name: José Ignacio González Catalán
- Date of birth: 2 December 1989 (age 36)
- Place of birth: Santiago, Chile
- Height: 1.87 m (6 ft 2 in)
- Position: Goalkeeper

Team information
- Current team: Everton

Youth career
- 2001–2006: Colo-Colo

Senior career*
| Years | Team | Apps | (Gls) |
| 2007–2012 | Colo-Colo B | 28 | (0) |
| 2008–2015 | Colo-Colo | 7 | (0) |
| 2011 | → Deportes Puerto Montt (loan) | 16 | (0) |
| 2013–2014 | → Everton (loan) | 2 | (0) |
| 2015–2016 | Deportes Copiapó | 30 | (0) |
| 2016–2017 | Palestino | 4 | (0) |
| 2017–2018 | San Luis | 44 | (0) |
| 2019 | Palestino | 4 | (0) |
| 2020–2022 | Deportes Antofagasta | 62 | (0) |
| 2023 | O'Higgins | 24 | (0) |
| 2024– | Everton | 0 | (0) |
- * Club domestic league appearances and goals as of 18 December 2023

José Ignacio González Catalán (Spanish pronunciation: [iɣˈnasjo ɣonˈsales], born 2 December 1989), known as Ignacio González, is a Chilean footballer who plays as a goalkeeper for Everton de Viña del Mar in the Chilean Primera División.

== Career ==
In 2023, González played for O'Higgins. The next season, he switched to Everton de Viña del Mar.

At international level, González was part of a Chile under-25 squad in a training session led by Claudio Borghi in May 2011, alongside his teammate in Deportes Puerto Montt, José Antonio Rojas.

== Personal life ==
In 2020, González started a real estate company called "As Inmobiliario" (Real Estate Ace).

== Honours ==
Colo-Colo

- Primera División de Chile (2): 2008 Clausura, 2009 Clausura

Individual

- Torneo Futsal Best Goalkeeper (1): 2010
