= Rodrigo Meléndez =

Chilean footballer and manager (born 1977)

Rodrigo Melendez
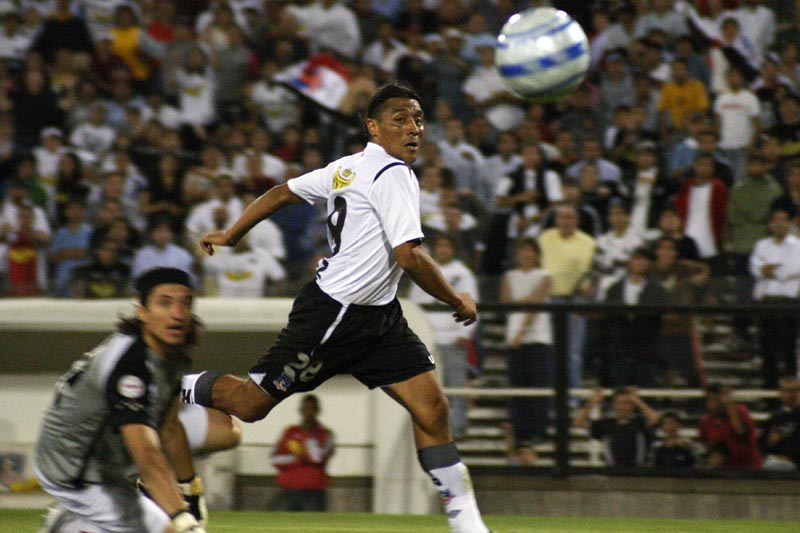

Personal information
- Full name: Rodrigo David Meléndez Araya
- Date of birth: 3 October 1977 (age 49)
- Place of birth: Santiago, Chile
- Height: 1.70 m (5 ft 7 in)
- Position: Defensive midfielder

Team information
- Current team: Deportes Linares

Youth career
- 1990–1996: Cobreloa

Senior career*
Years	Team	Apps	(Gls)
1996–2003	Cobreloa	142	(1)
2003–2004	Quilmes	32	(0)
2004–2005	Estudiantes LP	42	(0)
2006–2010	Colo-Colo	132	(2)
2011–2012	Deportes Iquique	41	(0)
2013	San Luis	9	(0)
2013	San Antonio Unido	9	(0)
Total		407	(3)

International career
2001–2007	Chile	26	(1)

Managerial career
- 2014: San Antonio Unido
- 2014: Deportes Melipilla
- 2015–2016: Unión La Calera (assistant)
- 2016–2017: Cobreloa (caretaker)
- 2018: Cobreloa
- 2019–2021: Deportes Colina
- 2021: Cobreloa
- 2023: Iberia
- 2024-2025: Deportes Linares
- 2026-: Deportes Linares
- * Club domestic league appearances and goals

Rodrigo David Meléndez Araya (born 3 October 1977) is a Chilean former professional football player and current manager of Deportes Linares. He played as a defensive midfielder in his years active.

During his football career, he has won seven Chilean league titles with Colo-Colo and Cobreloa.

== Football career ==
Meléndez came through the youth academies of Colo-Colo and Magallanes, before joining the senior team of Cobreloa, where he made his professional debut in 1996. With the club, he won the 2003 Torneo Clausura championship.

Nicknamed Kalule, after the Ugandan boxer Ayub Kalule, he moved to Argentina after being named Chilean Footballer of the Year. He first played for Quilmes AC and later for Estudiantes de La Plata.

In 2006, he returned to his boyhood club Colo-Colo, which had recovered from bankruptcy and was enjoying a resurgence. The defensive midfielder, who remained with the club until 2010, won six league titles and reached the final of the 2006 Copa Sudamericana, where Colo-Colo lost to Mexican side Pachuca.

After two seasons with Deportes Iquique and a six-month spell at San Luis de Quillota, he ended his playing career with Chilean club San Antonio Unido, where he became the team's head coach the following season.

== International career ==
Meléndez represented Chile at Copa América in 2004 and 2007.

== Managerial career ==
In June 2023, he signed with Iberia in the Segunda División Profesional de Chile.

== Personal life ==
His son, Javier, is a professional footballer from the Colo-Colo youth ranks who made his professional debut playing for Cobreloa in 2021.

== Career statistics ==
Goal	Date	Venue	Opponent	Score	Result	Competition
1.	15 November 2003	Estadio Centenario, Montevideo, Uruguay	Uruguay	1–0	1–2	2002 World Cup qualifier

== Honours ==
=== Player ===
Cobreloa

- Primera División: 2003 Clausura

Colo-Colo

- Primera División (6): 2006-A, 2006-C, 2007-A, 2007-C, 2008-C, 2009-C
- Copa Sudamericana: Runner-up 2006
