= Diego Olate =

Chilean footballer (born 1987)

Personal information
- Full name: Diego Alejandro Olate Jeria
- Date of birth: 11 January 1987 (age 39)
- Place of birth: Rancagua, Chile
- Height: 1.79 m (5 ft 10 1/2 in)
- Position: Defender

Youth career
- O'Higgins

Senior career*
Years	Team	Apps	(Gls)
2005–2011	O'Higgins	111	(0)
2009–2010	→ Colo-Colo (loan)	21	(0)
2011	→ Ñublense (loan)	11	(0)
2012	Deportes Antofagasta	1	(0)
2012	Santiago Morning	9	(0)
2013	Deportes Copiapó	8	(0)
2014	Husqvarna FF	6	(0)
2014–2015	Deportes La Serena	5	(0)
2017–2018	Colchagua	31	(0)
2019	Lautaro de Buin	17	(0)
Total		220	(0)
- * Club domestic league appearances and goals

Diego Alejandro Olate Jeria (born 11 January 1987) is a Chilean former footballer who played as a centre back.

== Club career ==
He won his first professional honour in 2009 with Colo-Colo after reach Torneo Clausura title under orders of Hugo Tocalli, with who was a regular starter.

In 2014, he joined Swedish second-tier team Husqvarna FF, being his first international experience.

== Honours ==
=== Club ===
Colo-Colo

- Primera División de Chile: 2009 Clausura
