= Arturo Sanhueza =

Chilean footballer (born 1979)

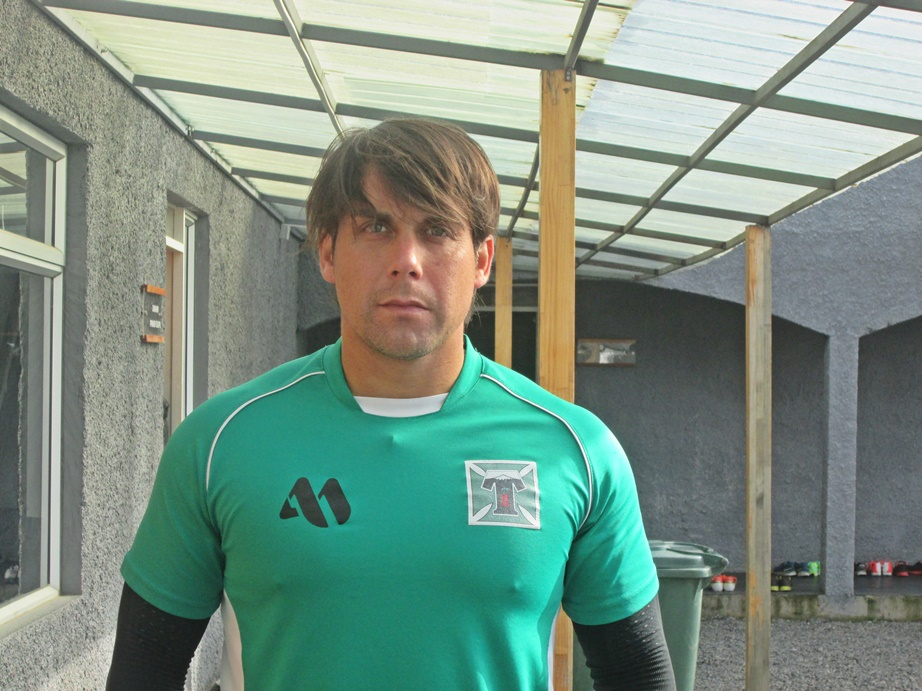
- Sanhueza with Deportes Temuco in 2014.

Personal information
- Full name: Héctor Arturo Sanhueza Medel
- Date of birth: 11 March 1979 (age 47)
- Place of birth: Concepción, Chile
- Height: 1.72 m (5 ft 8 in)
- Position: Defensive midfielder

Youth career
- Bernardo O'Higgins
- Fernández Vial

Senior career*
Years	Team	Apps	(Gls)
1996–1999	Fernández Vial	34	(4)
2000	Colo-Colo	0	(0)
2000	Everton	15	(1)
2001–2004	Santiago Wanderers	143	(6)
2005–2010	Colo-Colo	240	(7)
2011	Changchun Yatai	0	(0)
2011–2012	Deportes Iquique	47	(1)
2012	Universidad de Concepción	15	(0)
2013–2016	Deportes Temuco	101	(7)
2017–2018	Cobreloa	70	(5)
2019–2022	Fernández Vial	83	(0)
Total		748	(31)

International career
2001–2007	Chile	16	(0)

Managerial career
- 2024–2025: Deportes La Serena (assistant)
- 2025–2026: Deportes Temuco
- * Club domestic league appearances and goals

Héctor Arturo Sanhueza Medel (born 11 March 1979), known as Arturo Sanhueza, is a Chilean former professional footballer who played as a midfielder.

== Club career ==
Born in Concepción, Bío-Bío Region, Sanhueza started his career at hometown club Fernández Vial before moving to Everton, where he would spend an entire season. After Vina del Mar team's relegation, he moved to crosstown rivals Santiago Wanderers, led by Jorge Garcés, where he helped to win the 2001 league title.

Following three seasons at Valparaíso-based team, in 2005, he signed for Chilean powerhouse Colo-Colo after rejecting an offer from Mexico's Atlante. As an anecdote, in 2005 he took part of the reality TV show Adidas Selection Team from Fox Sports Chile, where a squad made up by youth players from professional teams faced players from schools, standing out future professional footballers such as Felipe Seymour, Nelson Saavedra, Eduardo Vargas, among others. Nevertheless, with Claudio Borghi arrival to the bench, Sanhueza became an undisputed player in the Apertura and Clausura titles as well as in the Copa Sudamericana which Colo-Colo was runner-up.

In December 2006, he was heavily linked with Argentinian giants Boca Juniors which wanted to sign him for replace Fernando Gago, who left Boca for Real Madrid.

After another four seasons playing for Colo-Colo where he won four league titles as captain, in December 2010 he wasn't considered by coach Diego Cagna and the club held a farewell for him during a press conference.

In 2011 Sanhueza moved to Deportes Iquique, freshly promoted to the top division after failing to join Chinese Super League side Changchun Yatai F.C., being only 20 days in this country. Following a season and half, in June 2012 he signed for Universidad de Concepción. However, after only six months playing, in December he announced his retirement from football.

On 8 January 2013, Sanhueza reversed his decision to retire and joined Primera B club Deportes Temuco. Three years later he, as captain, achieved the 2015–16 second-tier title and thereby the promotion to Primera División. Nevertheless he left Temuco and joined Cobreloa, Chilean powerhouse team which lost the category in 2015 and failed to achieve the promotion to first-tier.

At the end of 2022 season, he retired from the football activity as a professional player after a twenty-five-year career.

== Coaching career ==
In 2024, Sanhueza joined the technical staff of Erwin Durán in Deportes La Serena as assistant coach.

In September 2025, Sanhueza assumed as the manager of Deportes Temuco in the Primera B de Chile.

== Post-retirement ==
In April 2023, Sanhueza joined amateur club Colo Colito from Concepción, at the same time he performed as a football commentator at radio level.

In October 2026, Sanhueza joined the sports media Sabes Deportes as a football commentator.

== Honours ==
Santiago Wanderers

- Primera División: 2001

Colo-Colo

- Primera División (6): 2006-A, 2006-C, 2007-A, 2007-C, 2008-C, 2009-C
- Copa Sudamericana: Runner–up 2006

Deportes Temuco

- Primera B: 2015–16

Individual

- Campeonato Nacional Team of the Season (3): 2006, 2007, 2008
