= Nicolás Millán =

Chilean footballer (born 1991)

Personal information
- Full name: Nicolás Ignacio Millán Carrasco
- Date of birth: 17 November 1991 (age 34)
- Place of birth: Santiago, Chile
- Height: 1.77 m (5 ft 10 in)
- Position: Forward

Youth career
- 2003–2006: Colo Colo

Senior career*
Years	Team	Apps	(Gls)
2006–2012	Colo Colo	2	(0)
2008–2009	→ Rivadavia de Lincoln (loan)	4	(0)
2009–2010	→ Tigre (loan)	0	(0)
2011–2012	→ Naval (loan)	48	(6)
2013	Unión Temuco	11	(3)
2013–2015	Curicó Unido	46	(5)
2015–2016	Deportes Puerto Montt	26	(4)
2016–2017	Deportes Pintana	26	(3)
2017–2019	Deportes Copiapó	59	(7)
2020–2021	San Marcos	26	(0)
2021	Independiente Cauquenes	17	(1)
2022	Ferro General Píco	10	(0)
2023	Iberia	24	(2)
Total		299	(31)

International career
2006	Chile U17	3	(4)
- * Club domestic league appearances and goals

Nicolás Ignacio Millán Carrasco (born 17 November 1991) is a Chilean former professional footballer who played as a forward.

He is best known for being the youngest player to represent a Chilean team in professional football. His substitute appearance for Chilean club Colo Colo against Santiago Wanderers at the age of fourteen years, nine months and three days smashed the previous record of Frank Lobos considerably.

== Career ==
=== Colo-Colo ===
Millán, a precociously gifted attacking player, joined Colo Colo's youth set-up in 2003, and enjoyed a meteoric rise through the ranks. Before his first team debut Millán was promoted to the club's U-17 side, finding the back of the net three times in as many games. In 2006, he had a trial with English side Chelsea under josé Mourinho. In 2008, he left the club to join Club Rivadavia de Lincoln in Argentina on loan, before moving on to Tigre in 2009, also on loan. He has since returned to Colo Colo.

=== Naval (loan) ===
In December 2011, Millán joined Naval on a loan deal. He made his debut in the league on 14 August 2011, coming on as a 61st-minute substitute against Deportes Puerto Montt. Millán then got his first goal for Naval in the 3–1 win over San Marcos de Arica on 13 November 2011.

=== Unión Temuco ===
In November 2012, it was announced that Millán was joining Unión Temuco for the 2013 season on a free transfer following the expiration of his contract with Colo Colo after the conclusion of the 2012 season. He made his debut on 16 February, losing the game 1–0 to his former club Naval. He scored his first goal for the club on 9 March 2013, scoring an 81st minute consolation goal in his side's 4–1 loss against Barnechea. He then scored again in the next game in Unión Temuco's 4–3 win over Lota Schwager.

=== Curicó Unido ===
On 12 June 2013, it was announced that Millán has signed for fellow Chilean Primera División B side Curicó Unido. On 7 July 2013, he made his debut in the Copa Chile against O'Higgins, scoring in a 3–2 loss. On 28 July 2013, he made his league debut against CD Concepción in a match which ended 0-0.

=== Puerto Montt ===
After two seasons with Curicó Unido, Millán left the club to join newly promoted Primera B de Chile side Puerto Montt on 15 July 2015. He made his league debut on 9 August, coming on as a substitute in the 80th minute against Rangers de Talca. The match ended in a 1–0 defeat for Puerto Montt.

=== Iberia ===
In 2023, he returned to his homeland from Argentina and joined Deportes Iberia.

=== Retirement ===
Millán made official his retirement on 26 November 2025.

== Playing style ==
At age 14 Millán was dubbed the "Chilean Cristiano Ronaldo". When asked of comparing his ability to that of the Portuguese winger Millán replied: "I think my playing style is similar to his. I enjoy using the flanks and going past defenders, and I'm particularly good at stepovers.".

== Personal life ==
Millán is of Mapuche descent.

== Career statistics ==
As of 24 August 2015

Club	Season	League		Cup		Other		Total	
Club	Season	Apps	Goals	Apps	Goals	Apps	Goals	Apps	Goals
Colo Colo	2006	2	0	0	0	0	0	2	0
Colo Colo	2007	0	0	0	0	0	0	0	0
Rivadavia	2008	0	0	0	0	0	0	0	0
Tigre	2009	0	0	0	0	0	0	0	0
Tigre	2010	0	0	0	0	0	0	0	0
Colo Colo	2011	0	0	1	0	0	0	1	0
Naval	2011	12	1	1	0	0	0	13	1
Naval	2012	36	5	0	0	0	0	36	5
Unión Temuco	2013	11	3	0	0	0	0	11	3
Curicó Unido	2013–14	29	4	8	2	0	0	37	6
Curicó Unido	2014–15	17	1	4	0	0	0	21	1
Puerto Montt	2015–16	3	0	1	0	0	0	4	0
Career Total		110	14	15	2	0	0	125	16
