= Nery Veloso =

Chilean footballer (born 1987)

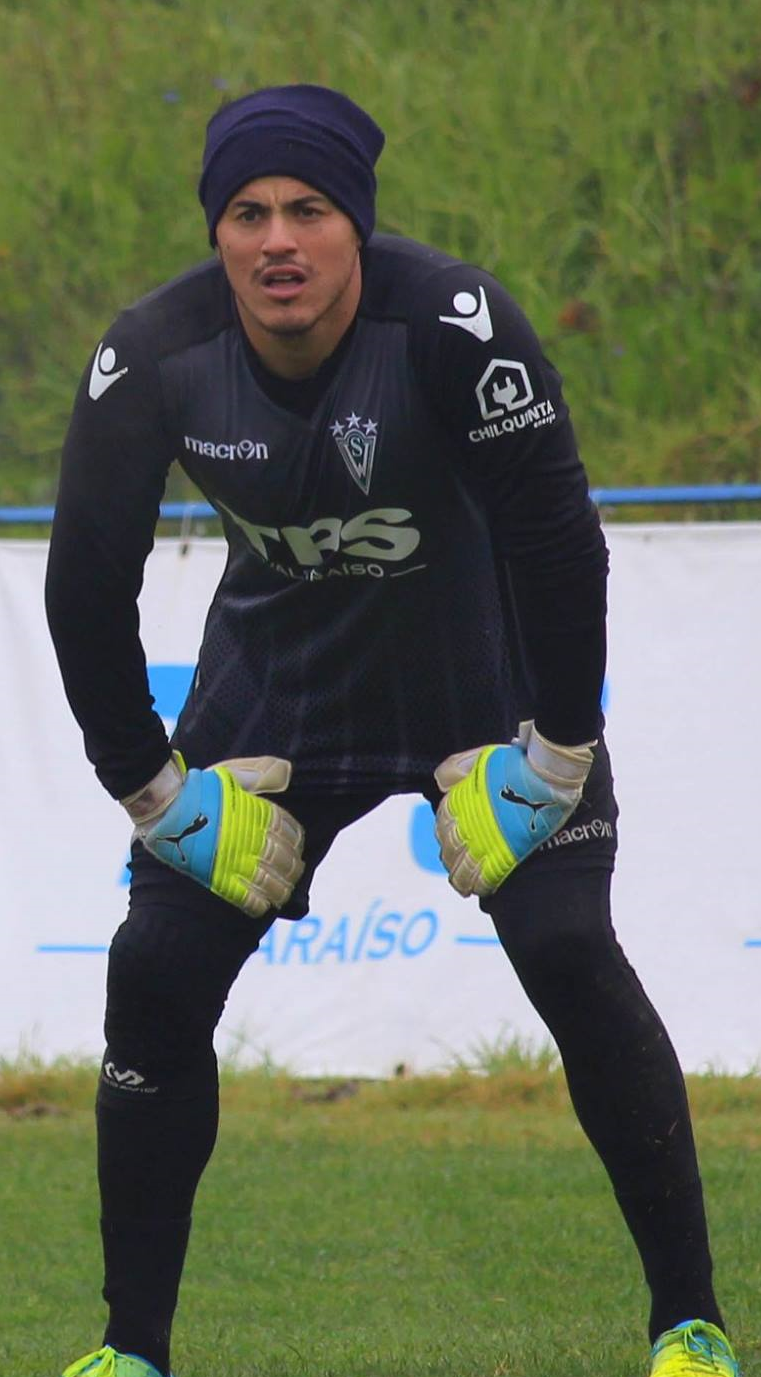
- Veloso with Santiago Wanderers in 2016

Personal information
- Full name: Nery Alexis Veloso Espinoza
- Date of birth: March 1, 1987 (age 39)
- Place of birth: Los Ángeles, Chile
- Height: 1.80 m (5 ft 11 in)
- Position: Goalkeeper

Team information
- Current team: Deportes Concepción
- Number: 12

Youth career
- Huachipato

Senior career*
Years	Team	Apps	(Gls)
2007–2015	Huachipato	90	(0)
2010	→ Colo-Colo (loan)	2	(0)
2011	→ Universidad de Chile (loan)	0	(0)
2011	→ Unión San Felipe (loan)	27	(0)
2014–2015	→ Audax Italiano (loan)	22	(0)
2015–2016	Unión Española	14	(0)
2016–2017	Santiago Wanderers	5	(0)
2019–2020	San Marcos	31	(0)
2020–2022	Palestino	7	(0)
2023–2024	Fernández Vial	48	(0)
2025	San Antonio Unido	12	(0)
2025	San Luis	0	(0)
2026–	Deportes Concepción	0	(0)

International career
2007	Chile U20		
2009	Chile	1	(0)
- * Club domestic league appearances and goals as of 5 January 2026

Nery Alexis Veloso Espinoza (born March 1, 1987) is a Chilean football goalkeeper who plays for Deportes Concepción.

== Club career ==
Veloso made his way through the youth ranks of Huachipato until he was finally called up to the adult side in 2006 and finally making his debut as a professional in 2007 against Melipilla. In the Clausura 2008 tournament in Chile, Veloso took over as Huachipato's first-choice goalkeeper and led the team to the quarterfinals of the playoffs losing to Colo-Colo. The ANFP awarded Veloso Best Goalkeeper Award at the end of the season. Veloso has since been linked to moves to either Universidad de Chile or Colo-Colo. Finally, it was loaned to Colo-Colo for the 2010 season.

In January 2011, Huachipato loaned Veloso to Unión San Felipe for one year.

In 2023, he joined Fernández Vial in the Segunda División Profesional de Chile.

In January 2025, Veloso signed with San Antonio Unido. In July of the same year, he switched to San Luis de Quillota.

On 5 January 2026, Veloso joined Deportes Concepción in the top division.

== International career ==
Veloso was named the back up goalkeeper for Chile at the 2007 FIFA U-20 World Cup. Veloso did not participate in any of the games of the tournament but Chile won third place at the tournament. Marcelo Bielsa called Veloso up to the adult side for a friendly versus Honduras in January 2009 but Veloso did not play. In May 2009 Bielsa once again named Veloso as back up goalkeeper for the Kirin Cup in Japan. Due to injuries to regular third string goalkeeper for Chile Christopher Toselli, Veloso was called up again for two 2010 FIFA World Cup qualifiers in June 2009. He made his debut with the Chile national football team in a friendly against Paraguay in Talcahuano winning 2–1.

== Personal life ==
In 2025, Veloso set up a nut and healthy food store in Penco, Chile.

== Honors ==
Huachipato

- Primera División de Chile (1): 2012 Clausura

Chile U20

- FIFA U-20 World Cup third place: 2007

Individual

- Best Goalkeeper of Primera División de Chile Award: 2008
