= César Talma =

Chilean footballer (born 1980)

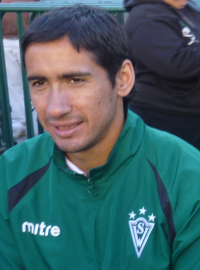
- Talma with Santiago Wanderers (2010)

Personal information
- Full name: César Antonio Talma Díaz
- Date of birth: 23 October 1980 (age 46)
- Place of birth: Frutillar, Chile
- Height: 1.77 m (5 ft 10 in)
- Position: Defender

Senior career*
Years	Team	Apps	(Gls)
2000–2004	Provincial Osorno		
2005	Palestino		
2006–2008	Deportes Puerto Montt		
2009	Deportes Iquique		
2010	Santiago Wanderers		
2011–2013	Deportes Puerto Montt		
- * Club domestic league appearances and goals as of 23 March 2020

César Antonio Talma Díaz (born 28 October 1980) is a retired Chilean footballer.

He played for Deportes Puerto Montt.

== Personal life ==
Talma is of Mapuche descent.
