= Michael Godoy =

Paraguayan footballer (born 1983)

Personal information
- Full name: Michael Osmar Godoy Núñez
- Date of birth: 21 April 1975 (age 51)
- Place of birth: Caacupé, Paraguay
- Height: 1.83 m (6 ft 0 in)
- Position: Centre-back

Senior career*
Years	Team	Apps	(Gls)
2004	Cerro Porteño	0	(0)
2005–2008	Olimpia	53	(2)
2008	3 de Febrero	17	(2)
2009	Sportivo Luqueño	11	(1)
2009	Cobresal	14	(3)
2010–2011	Universidad de Concepción	49	(3)
2012	Independiente FBC	29	(2)
2013	San Lorenzo	–	(–)
Total		173	(13)
- * Club domestic league appearances and goals

Michael Osmar Godoy Núñez (born 17 July 1983) is a Paraguayan former professional footballer who played as a centre-back for clubs like Cerro Porteño, Olimpia and Universidad de Concepción.
