= Patricio Gutiérrez =

Chilean footballer (born 1983)

Personal information
- Full name: Patricio Javier Gutiérrez Olivos
- Date of birth: 20 March 1983 (age 43)
- Place of birth: Curicó, Chile
- Height: 1.85 m (6 ft 1 in)
- Position: Left back

Youth career
- Curicó Unido

Senior career*
Years	Team	Apps	(Gls)
2002	Curicó Unido	–	(–)
2003–2005	Colo-Colo	–	(–)
2006	Antofagasta	13	(0)
2007	Unión La Calera	–	(–)
2007–2009	Audax Italiano	57	(3)
2009–2010	Curicó Unido	38	(5)
2011	San Luis de Quillota	16	(3)
2011	Iquique	7	(1)
2012	Antofagasta	11	(1)
2012–2013	Cobresal	30	(2)
2013–2014	San Marcos de Arica	36	(6)
2014–2015	Rangers	29	(5)
2015–2016	Curicó Unido	16	(1)
2016–2017	Ind. Cauquenes	42	(13)
- * Club domestic league appearances and goals as of 15:22, 9 May 2021

Patricio Javier Gutiérrez Olivos (born March 20, 1983) is a Chilean footballer. Gutiérrez can be utilized as a defender or midfielder. His nickname is "Pato."

== Career ==
=== Club career ===
Gutiérrez began his career in the youth ranks of Deportes Antofagasta and debuted on the adult squad in 2005. However, he did not get many chances with the first team and in 2007 moved to Primera B side Unión La Calera. Because of his good form he was signed by Primera División side Audax Italiano, where he immediately found his spot in the starting eleven.
