= Cristian Bogado =

Paraguayan footballer (born 1987)

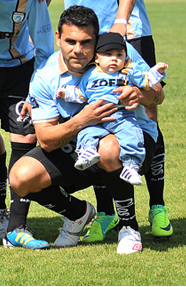
- Cristian Bogado (2013)

Personal information
- Full name: Cristian Venancio Bogado Morínigo
- Date of birth: 7 January 1987 (age 39)
- Place of birth: Villarrica, Paraguay
- Height: 1.78 m (5 ft 10 in)
- Position: Striker

Youth career
- 2001–2004: Sol de América

Senior career*
Years	Team	Apps	(Gls)
2004	Sol de América	20	(4)
2005	Libertad	5	(0)
2005–2007	Nacional Asunción	75	(17)
2007–2008	Estudiantes LP	14	(0)
2009	Deportes Iquique	13	(8)
2009–2011	Colo-Colo	31	(9)
2010	→ Olimpia Asunción (loan)	8	(0)
2011	→ Deportes Iquique (loan)	29	(9)
2012–2016	Deportes Iquique	70	(27)
2014	→ Unión Comercio (loan)	28	(17)
2016	Unión Comercio	17	(3)
2016–2017	Rubio Ñú	11	(1)
2017–2018	Unión Comercio	47	(22)
2018	Audax Italiano	2	(0)
2019	River Plate	1	(0)

International career
2007	Paraguay U20	11	(3)
2006–2008	Paraguay	2	(1)
- * Club domestic league appearances and goals as of 08:34, 20 May 2020 (UTC)

Cristian Venancio Bogado Morínigo (born 7 January 1987) is a Paraguayan footballer who plays as a striker.

== International goals ==
Goal	Date	Venue	Opponent	Score	Result	Competition
1	22 May 2008	Estadio Sausalito, Yokohama, Japan	Ivory Coast	1–1	1–1	Kirin Cup

== Honours ==
=== Club ===
Colo-Colo

- Primera División de Chile (1): 2009 Clausura
