= Camillo Casarini =

Italian politician and patriot

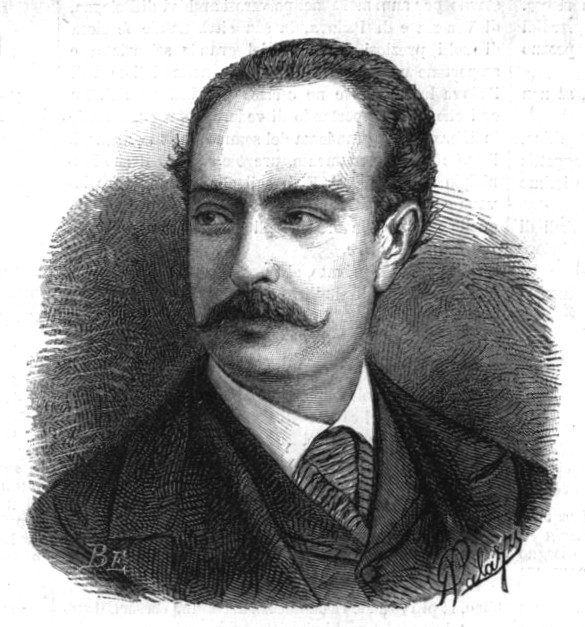
Italian illustration 1874 n. 5 - Camillo Casarini

Camillo Casarini (August 8, 1830, in Bologna – April 21, 1874, in Bologna) was an Italian politician and patriot, collaborating with Cavour. In 1865 he was elected to the National Parliament. In that period he developed a progressive estrangement from the political right and adhered to the nascent constitutional Left, calling for the birth of a grand progressive national party. In July 1869 he won the administrative elections in Bologna and became mayor at the head of a coalition of forces that took the name of Partito degli azzurri (Blue Party). His archive can be seen at the Museo civico del Risorgimento di Bologna.
