= Nelson Cereceda =

Chilean footballer (born 1991)

Personal information
- Full name: Nelson Alejandro Cereceda Cabello
- Date of birth: 8 August 1991 (age 35)
- Place of birth: Santa Cruz, Chile
- Height: 1.66 m (5 ft 5 in)
- Position: Full-back

Youth career
- Colo-Colo

Senior career*
Years	Team	Apps	(Gls)
2009–2014	Colo-Colo	0	(0)
2011	→ Deportes Copiapó (loan)	25	(0)
2012	→ Deportes Temuco (loan)	14	(0)
2013	→ Santiago Morning (loan)	2	(0)
2013–2014	→ Lota Schwager (loan)	18	(1)
2014	→ Magallanes (loan)	1	(0)
2015	Magallanes	6	(0)
2015–2016	Colchagua	0	(0)
Total		66	(1)
- * Club domestic league appearances and goals

Nelson Alejandro Cereceda Cabello (born 8 August 1991) is a Chilean former professional footballer who played as a full-back.

== Career ==
A product of the Colo-Colo youth system, Cereceda played on loan for Deportes Copiapó, Deportes Temuco, Santiago Morning, Lota Schwager and Magallanes.

His last club was Colchagua.

At international level, he was part of a Chile under-25 squad in a training session led by Claudio Borghi in May 2011, being a player of Deportes Copiapó.

== Personal life ==
He and his teammate in Magallanes, Nikolás Altamirano, had a serious traffic accident while they went to train to San Bernardo in August 2014. Cereceda suffered a TBI with no aftereffects.

== Honours ==
Colo-Colo

- Primera División de Chile: 2009 Clausura
