= Miguel Riffo =

Chilean footballer (born 1981)

Personal information
- Full name: Miguel Augusto Riffo Garay
- Date of birth: 21 June 1981 (age 45)
- Place of birth: Santiago, Chile
- Height: 1.83 m (6 ft 0 in)
- Position: Defender

Team information
- Current team: Curicó Unido (youth manager)

Youth career
- 1992–2001: Colo-Colo

Senior career*
Years	Team	Apps	(Gls)
2001–2010	Colo-Colo	212	(10)
2011	Santiago Morning	30	(4)
Total		242	(14)

International career
2007	Chile	9	(0)

Managerial career
- 2013–2015: Colo-Colo (assistant)
- 2015–2016: Unión La Calera
- 2018: Deportes Iquique
- 2020–2021: Deportes Antofagasta (assistant)
- 2021–2022: Coquimbo Unido (assistant)
- 2023–: Curicó Unido (youth)
- 2023: Curicó Unido (interim)
- 2024: Curicó Unido (interim)
- * Club domestic league appearances and goals

Miguel Augusto Riffo Garay (born 21 June 1981) is a former Chilean professional football player and the current manager of Curicó Unido's youth categories.

== Club career ==
A product of Colo-Colo's youth setup, he won eight titles in his career with that club. In the 2000s, alongside his teammates Claudio Bravo, Luis Mena and Fernando Meneses, he also studied a technical-professional career in physical activity at the University of the Americas.

His most successful moment with the coach Claudio Borghi, when he also was named during the 2007 season at the Chilean Primera División Best Eleven. Although Riffo was born with a club foot, that complicated him very much, because he had to make several operations in his foot. In the 2010 season, he abandoned the club, because the Argentine coach Diego Cagna not considered him for the next season and in January 2011, he signed for Santiago Morning.

In March 2012, he announced his retirement from professional football, because Morning was relegated to the Primera B and also Riffo was titled as football coach at the ANFP, the last season that he played.

== International career ==
He has appeared in the Chile national team. He played in one game at the Copa América 2007 versus Brazil when he committed a penalty. Later in the match Riffo was injured. Riffo played in the first four games of the 2010 FIFA World Cup qualification. Riffo started the first four games receiving a yellow card against Argentina; he did not appear in the remainder of the qualification process.

== Honours ==
=== Club ===
Colo-Colo

- Primera División (7): 2002–C, 2006–A, 2006–C, 2007–A, 2007–C, 2008–C, 2009–C
- Copa Sudamericana: Runner-up 2006

=== Individual ===
- Primera División de Chile Team Of The Season: 2007
