= Francisco Prieto =

Chilean footballer (born 1983)

Personal information
- Full name: Francisco Javier Prieto Caroca
- Date of birth: 1 July 1983 (age 43)
- Place of birth: Antofagasta, Chile
- Height: 1.88 m (6 ft 2 in)
- Position: Goalkeeper

Youth career
- 1991–1998: Minera Escondida
- 2000–2001: Huachipato

Senior career*
Years	Team	Apps	(Gls)
2001–2003	Fernández Vial	0	(0)
2004–2007	Santiago Wanderers	100	(0)
2008	Cobreloa	9	(0)
2009–2014	Colo-Colo	67	(0)
2013–2014	→ Mirandés (loan)	16	(0)
2014–2015	Ponferradina	3	(0)
2015–2017	San Antonio Unido	26	(0)
2017–2018	Cobresal	9	(0)

International career^{‡}
2007–2012	Chile	1	(0)
- * Club domestic league appearances and goals as of 22 January 2019 ‡ National team caps and goals as of 31 July 2021

Francisco Javier Prieto Caroca (born 1 July 1983) is a Chilean former footballer who played as a goalkeeper.

== Coaching career ==
Prieto started a goalkeeping academy named Ser Portero (Be a Goalkeeper). In addition, he has served as a goalkeeping coach for Santiago United Academy, a football academy founded by Esteban Paredes focused in American and Chilean players.

== Honours ==
Colo-Colo

- Primera División de Chile (1): 2009 Clausura
