= Eduardo Farías =

Chilean footballer (born 1989)

Personal information
- Full name: Eduardo Ignacio Farías Díaz
- Date of birth: 1 January 1989 (age 37)
- Place of birth: Lo Prado, Santiago, Chile
- Height: 1.79 m (5 ft 10 in)
- Position: Midfielder

Youth career
- Cobresal

Senior career*
| Years | Team | Apps | (Gls) |
| 2009–2014 | Cobresal | 134 | (3) |
| 2014–2016 | Unión La Calera | 39 | (0) |
| 2016 | Magallanes | 10 | (0) |
| 2017–2018 | Deportes Iquique | 14 | (0) |
| 2019–2021 | Cobresal | 70 | (0) |
| 2022 | Cobreloa | 24 | (1) |
| 2023–2025 | San Marcos | 33 | (3) |
- * Club domestic league appearances and goals as of 11 February 2026

Eduardo Ignacio Farías Díaz (born 1 January 1989) is a Chilean footballer who plays as a midfielder.

== Career ==
Born in Lo Prado, Santiago, Chile, Farías is a product of Cobresal. He switched to Unión La Calera in the second half of 2014.

After a brief stint with Magallanes in the second half of 2016, he joined Deportes Iquique the next year.

In 2019, Farías returned to Cobresal. In 2023, he switched to Cobreloa.

In 2023, Farías signed with San Marcos de Arica. At the end of the season, he renewed for two years.
