= Gino Clara =

Argentine footballer (born 1988)

Personal information
- Full name: Gino Agustín Clara
- Date of birth: 26 May 1988 (age 38)
- Place of birth: Avellaneda, Argentina
- Height: 1.70 m (5 ft 7 in)
- Position: Forward

Team information
- Current team: Agropoli

Youth career
- 2009–2010: Huracán

Senior career*
Years	Team	Apps	(Gls)
2010	Huracán	15	(2)
2010–2011	Unión San Felipe	0	(0)
2010	→ Colo-Colo (loan)	4	(0)
2011	→ Rangers (loan)	10	(1)
2011–2013	Independiente	1	(0)
2012–2013	→ Los Andes (loan)	4	(0)
2013–2015	Villa San Carlos	13	(1)
2015–	Agropoli		
- * Club domestic league appearances and goals as of 1 April 2015

Gino Agustín Clara (born 26 May 1988) is an Argentine football forward who plays for US Agropoli in Italy.

== Club career ==
=== Huracán ===
Born in Avellaneda, Clara joined Huracán's youth ranks as a child, and was promoted to the first team in 2009 to play the Apertura tournament of that year. He made his professional debut on 23 August 2009 in a 2–1 defeat against Lanús, as a half time substitute for Gastón Esmerado. In the 90th minute of that game he received a yellow card. During the 2010 Clausura, Clara was featured in the bench consecutively for the 6th and 7th matchdays. He had his first start for Huracán in the next game, against Tigre. On 19 March 2010, Clara scored his first professional goal for in a 2–0 victory against Chacarita Juniors. His second goal for the club came on 6 April, scoring the only goal of the game against Arsenal de Sarandí.

=== Chile ===
His good performances in Huracán earned the interest of some Argentine clubs. However, after a contract conflict with Huracán, he accepted an offer from Chilean Primera División side Unión San Felipe, that immediately loaned him to Chilean club Colo-Colo. On 19 August, Clara was presented as new player of the team alongside the club's president Guillermo Mackenna, with the number 30 shirt. In his presentation, Clara said:"I am a young player who can play down the right wing, I am quick and I love to take people on."

He debuted for Colo-Colo in a 2–0 victory over Everton at Estadio Sausalito as a 74th-minute substitute for Javier Cámpora. On 7 November 2010, Clara made his first start for the club in the Chilean derby, against Universidad de Chile, where he was replaced by Ezequiel Miralles in the 63rd minute.

After 6 months in Colo-Colo, Clara spent the first half of 2011 playing for Rangers, another Chilean club.

=== Independiente ===
After one year in Chile, the Argentine forward returned to his native country, joining Independiente.
