= Alberto Ortega =

Uruguayan footballer (born 1978)

Personal information
- Full name: Alberto Javier Ortega Rosa
- Date of birth: 11 July 1978 (age 48)
- Place of birth: Montevideo, Uruguay
- Height: 1.78 m (5 ft 10 in)
- Position: Midfielder

Youth career
- Cerro

Senior career*
Years	Team	Apps	(Gls)
1998–2004	Cerro	178	(20)
2004–2006	Cerrito	73	(4)
2007	Cerro		(total above)
2008	Aurora	22	(1)
2009–2011	Curicó Unido	53	(9)
2011	Deportes Copiapó	31	(2)
2012	Independiente FBC	1	(0)
2012	El Tanque Sisley	1	(0)
- * Club domestic league appearances and goals

Alberto Javier Ortega Rosa (born 11 July 1978 in Montevideo) is a Uruguayan former football midfielder.

== Teams ==
- (Uruguay) Cerro 1998–2003
- (Uruguay) Cerrito 2004–2006
- (Uruguay) Cerro 2007
- (Bolivia) Aurora 2008
- (Chile) Curicó Unido 2009–2010
- (Chile) Deportes Copiapó 2011
- (Paraguay) Independiente FBC 2012
- (Uruguay) El Tanque Sisley 2012
