= José Olguín (water polo) =

Mexican water polo player (1926–1998)

Personal information
- Nationality: Mexican
- Born: 19 December 1926
- Died: 4 May 1998 (aged 71); Mexico City, Mexico

Sport
- Sport: Water polo

José Olguín (19 December 1926 – 4 May 1998) was a Mexican water polo player. He competed in the men's tournament at the 1952 Summer Olympics.
