= Cristián Olguín =

Chilean footballer

Personal information
- Full name: Juan Cristián Olguín Acuña
- Date of birth: 5 December 1963 (age 62)
- Place of birth: Santiago, Chile
- Position: Forward

Youth career
- Palestino

Senior career*
Years	Team	Apps	(Gls)
1981–1987	Palestino	152	(32)
1988–1990	Universidad de Chile	59	(17)
1991–1992	Coquimbo Unido	51	(17)
1993	Provincial Osorno	12	(0)
1994	Rangers	23	(1)
1994	Deportes Iquique	8	(0)
1995–1996	Unión San Felipe	36	(5)

International career
1983	Chile U20		
1989	Chile	1	(0)
- * Club domestic league appearances and goals

Juan Cristián Olguín Acuña (born 5 December 1963), known as Cristián Olguín, is a Chilean former football player who played as a forward.

== Club career ==
A product of Palestino, Olguín was promoted to the first team at the age of 17 alongside players such as Elías Figueroa, Sergio Messen and Manuel Rojas. He spent seven seasons with them between 1981 and 1987.

In 1988, Olguín switched to Universidad de Chile and was part of the squad that was relegated by first time in the club history to the Chilean second level for the 1989 season and immediately returned to the 1990 Chilean Primera División.

In 1991, Olguín joined Coquimbo Unido, the squad that became the runner-up in the Chilean Primera División and took part in the 1992 Copa Libertadores.

Following Coquimbo Unido, Olguín played for Provincial Osorno (1993) and Rangers de Talca (1994) in the Chilean top level. In his last years, Olguín spent seasons with Deportes Iquique (1994) and Unión San Felipe (1995–96) in the Chilean second level.

== International career ==
Olguín represented Chile U20 at the 1983 South American Championship.

At senior level, Olguín made one appearance for Chile in the 0–1 away loss against Ecuador on 29 January 1989.

== Coaching career ==
Olguín has coached the football team of Duoc UC.
