= Carlos Escobar (footballer, born 1990) =

Chilean footballer

Personal information
- Full name: Carlos Andrés Escobar Casarin
- Date of birth: September 13, 1990 (age 36)
- Place of birth: Santiago, Chile
- Height: 1.80 m (5 ft 11 in)
- Position: Full back

Youth career
- Universidad de Chile

Senior career*
Years	Team	Apps	(Gls)
2009–2011	Universidad de Chile	4	(0)
2010	→ San Luis (loan)	6	(0)
2012–2013	Unión Temuco	11	(0)
2013	Deportes Concepción	5	(0)
Total		26	(0)
- * Club domestic league appearances and goals

Carlos Andrés Escobar Casarin (born September 13 of 1990 in Santiago, Chile) is a Chilean former footballer who played as a defender. He debuted playing for Universidad de Chile against Palestino in 2009.

== Honours ==
=== Club ===
Universidad de Chile

- Primera División de Chile (2): 2009 Apertura, 2011–A
