= Guillermo Pacheco (footballer) =

Chilean footballer

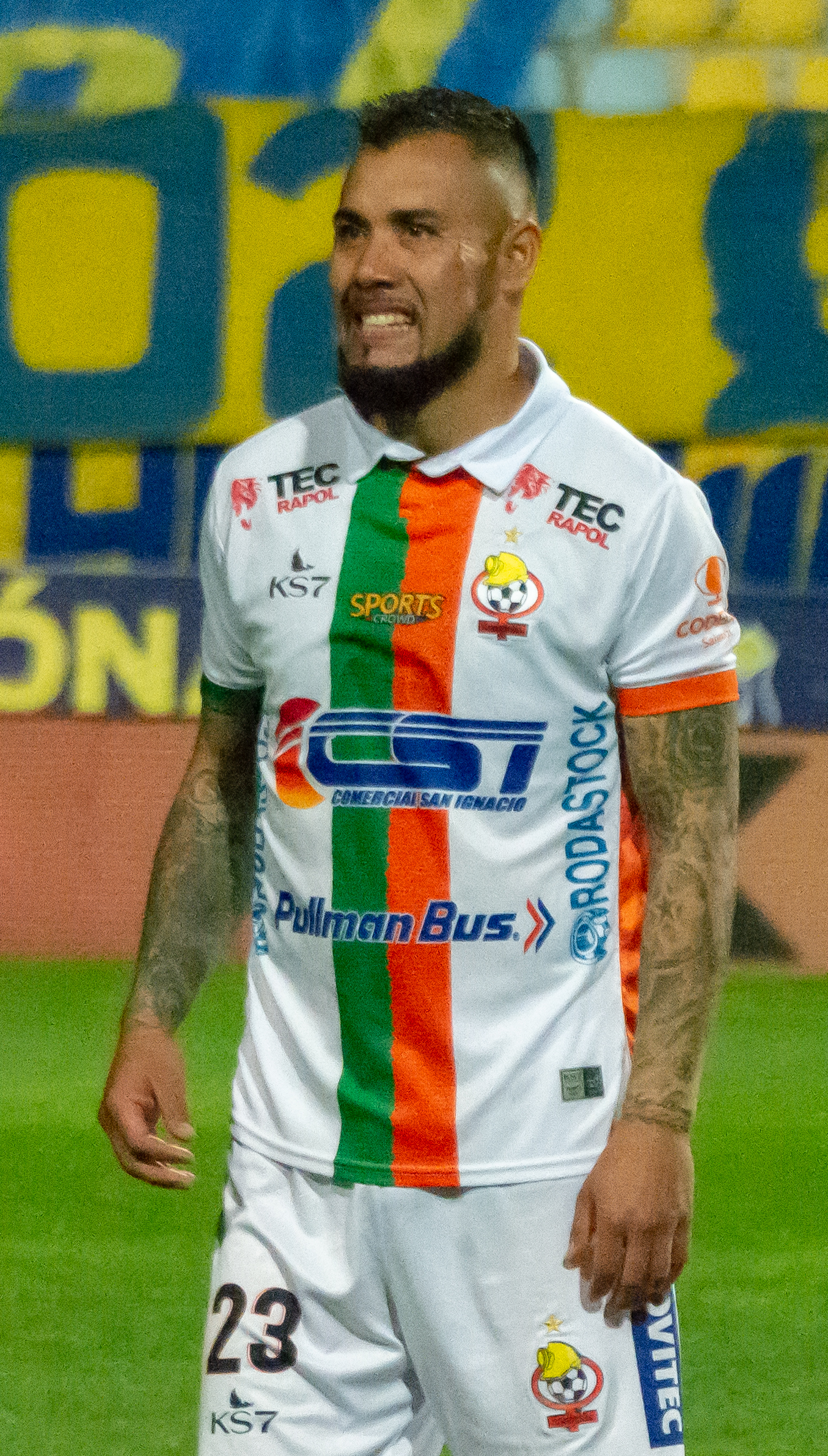
- Pacheco with Cobresal in 2023

Personal information
- Full name: Guillermo Alfonso Pacheco Tudela
- Date of birth: 10 April 1989 (age 37)
- Place of birth: Quilpué, Chile
- Height: 1.81 m (5 ft 11 in)
- Position: Right-back

Team information
- Current team: Cobresal
- Number: 23

Youth career
- San Luis

Senior career*
Years	Team	Apps	(Gls)
2008–2016	San Luis	225	(14)
2016–2020	Universidad de Concepción	67	(3)
2021	Deportes Temuco	30	(2)
2022–2024	Cobresal	83	(7)
2025	Deportes Limache	17	(1)
2026–	Cobresal	0	(0)
- * Club domestic league appearances and goals as of 19 December 2025

Guillermo Alfonso Pacheco Tudela (born 10 April 1989) is a Chilean footballer who plays as a right-back for Cobresal.

== Club career ==
Born in Quilpué, Chile, Pacheco was trained at San Luis de Quillota. A historical player for them, he spent nine seasons between 2008 and 2016, became the team captain and won three titles of the Primera B de Chile in 2009 Clausura, 2013 Apertura and 2014–15.

In May 2016, Pacheco moved to Universidad de Concepción. With them, he took part in the 2018 and the 2019 Copa Libertadores and made an appearance at the 2016 Copa Sudamericana in the 3–0 away loss against Bolívar on 16 August.

After Universidad de Concepción, Pacheco was as a free agent for about seven months until he signed with Deportes Temuco in February 2021.

In 2022, Pacheco signed with Cobresal in the Chilean Primera División, took part in the 2024 Copa Libertadores and left them at the end of the 2024 season.

After Cobresal, Pacheco continued in the Chilean top level with Deportes Limache, then the promoted club for the 2025 season. The next season, he rejoined Cobresal.
