= Matías Quiroga (midfielder) =

Argentine footballer

Personal information
- Full name: Matías Leonel Quiroga
- Date of birth: 25 January 1986 (age 40)
- Place of birth: Capitán Bermúdez, Argentina
- Height: 1.75 m (5 ft 9 in)
- Position: Left midfielder

Youth career
- –2001: Newell's Old Boys
- 2001–2003: Argentino de Rosario
- 2003–2004: Newell's Old Boys
- 2004–2005: Talleres

Senior career*
Years	Team	Apps	(Gls)
2006–2009	Talleres	56	(21)
2009	Newell's Old Boys	0	(0)
2010	Colo-Colo	22	(5)
2011–2012	Huracán	17	(0)
2012–2013	Defensa y Justicia	16	(0)
2013–2014	Sportivo Belgrano	50	(5)
2015	Atlanta	22	(3)
2016	Almirante Brown	10	(0)
2016	Concepción	15	(2)
2017–2019	Sarmiento de Resistencia	33	(1)
- * Club domestic league appearances and goals

Matías Leonel Quiroga (Spanish pronunciation: [maˈti.as kiˈɾoɣa], born 25 January 1986) is an Argentine former football midfielder.

== Career ==
Quiroga began his playing career in 2006 with Talleres de Córdoba. In 2009, he was signed by Newell's Old Boys but never played a first team game for the club. In 2010, he left to join Colo Colo of Chile in 2010.

In 2017, Quiroga signed with Sarmiento de Resistencia from Concepción. They were his last club and left them in June 2019.
