= University of the Americas (Chile) =

Coordinates: 33.43686°S 70.61569°W

- Universidad de Las Américas
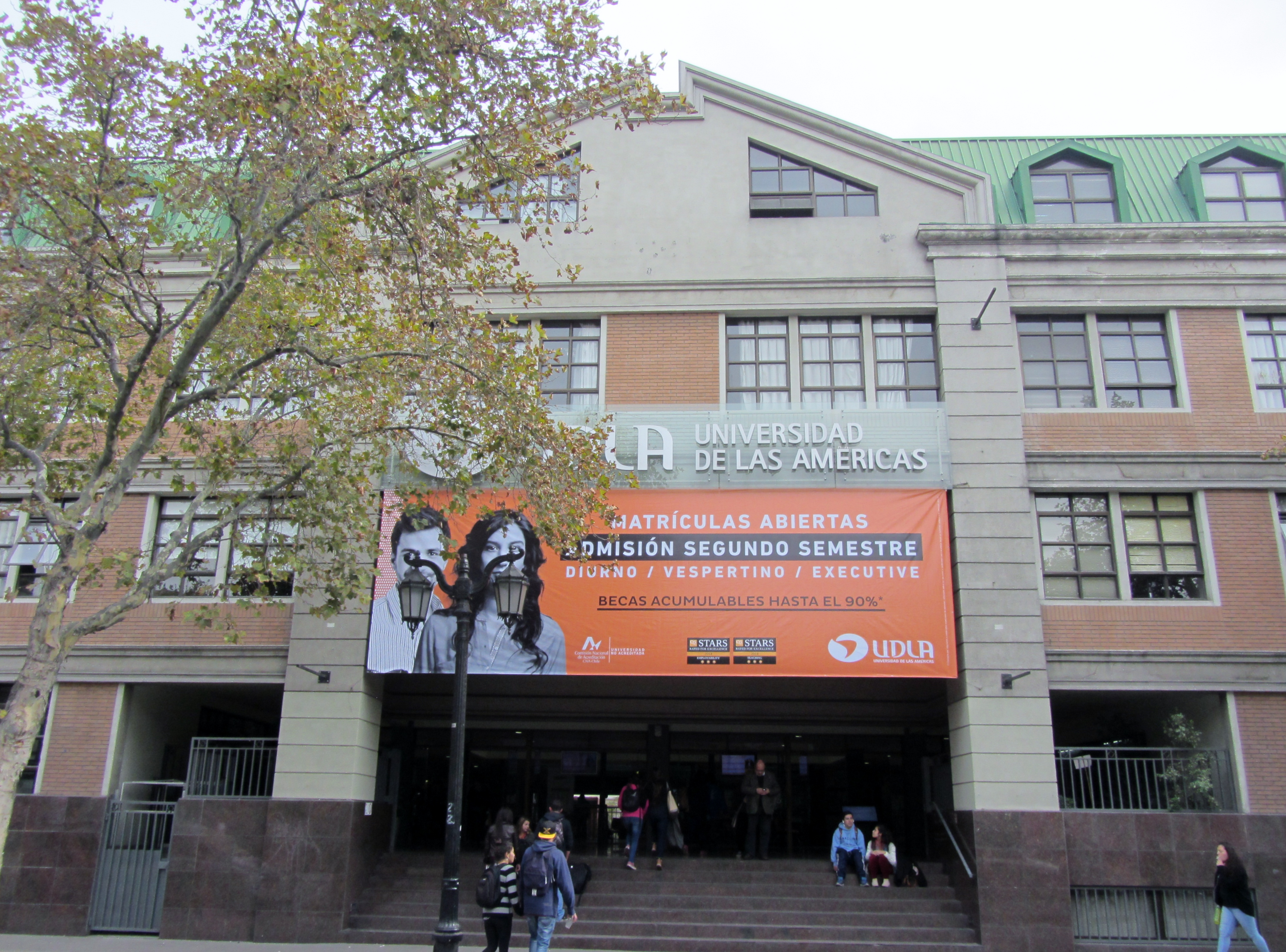
- Motto: Tu meta es la nuestra
- Motto in English: Your goal is ours
- Type: private, non-profit
- Established: 1988
- President: Jorge Selume
- Rector: Pilar Romaguera, PhD
- Academic staff: 500
- Students: 22,790
- Undergraduates: 33,000 (2025)
- Postgraduates: 56
- Location: Santiago, Region Metropolitana, Chile
- Campus: 219,407 square metres (54.217 acres)
- Website: www.udla.cl
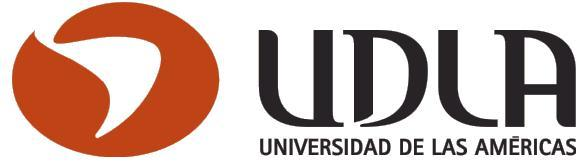

University of the Americas (Spanish: Universidad de Las Américas), locally known as UDLA, is a private Chilean university.

== History ==
UDLA was founded in 1988 and started its academic activities in 1989. Its headquarters are located in the commune of Providencia, in Santiago.

Its first rector was Mario Albornoz, a commercial engineer from the Pontifical Catholic University of Chile and MA in economics from the University of Chicago.

In 1995, UDLA created a branch in Quito, Ecuador.

In 1997, it was declared autonomous in 1997 by the CSE, a branch of Mineduc.

In 2000, Laureate International Universities, acquired UDLA, allowing students to obtain combined degrees from other institutions in the Laureate group. In 2020, the organization left its work in the country and the university's finances were taken over by non-profit organization Foundation of Education and Culture (Spanish: Fundación Educación y Cultura).

== Locations ==
- Greater Santiago
  - Providencia
  - Downtown Santiago
  - Maipu
  - La Florida
  - Maipú
- Greater Concepcion
  - Chacabuco
  - El Boldal
- Viña del Mar
  - Los Castaños
