= 2006 Torneo Apertura (Chile) =

Campeonato Nacional Apertura Copa Banco del Estado
- Season: 2006
- Dates: 27 January – 2 July 2006
- Champions: Colo-Colo; 24th title
- 2007 Copa Libertadores: Colo-Colo
- 2006 Copa Sudamericana: Colo-Colo; Huachipato
- Matches played: 187
- Goals scored: 571 (3.05 per match)
- Top goalscorer: Humberto Suazo (19 goals)
- Biggest home win: Colo-Colo 7–2 Rangers (2 April)
- Biggest away win: Palestino 1–5 Deportes Puerto Montt (31 March)
- Highest attendance: 61,000; Colo-Colo 0–1 Universidad de Chile (2 July)
- Total attendance: 1,094,440
- Average attendance: 5,852

The 2006 Campeonato Nacional Apertura Copa Banco del Estado was the 79th Chilean League top flight, in which Colo-Colo won its 24th league title after beating Universidad de Chile on penalties, in the finals.

== Qualifying stage ==
=== Scores ===
	ANT	AUD	CLO	CSA	COL	COQ	EVE	HUA	LSE	OHI	PAL	PMO	RAN	SMO	UCA	UCH	UCO	UES	SWA
Antofagasta		1–1	1–1	3–1						1–2	3–1			1–1		0–1		3–0	2–1
Audax					1–3		3–0		3–2	3–0	2–2				0–0		1–2	1–1	
Cobreloa		0–1				3–1			2–2			2–1	5–1		2–3	2–1		1–0	
Cobresal		2–4	2–4			2–0	0–0	1–2			4–0	3–2				3–3			2–1
Colo-Colo	3–0		2–0	3–0		5–1	5–3	0–2					7–2		2–3				5–0
Coquimbo	0–1	0–1						2–2		2–1			0–0	1–1	1–1	0–0	1–1	1–1	
Everton	2–0		0–2			1–0				0–2	1–1				1–0	1–1	1–2		2–0
Huachipato	2–0	1–3	4–2				2–0			0–0	1–0	3–2		3–1	1–2	2–0			
La Serena	3–1			1–1	3–3	2–2	2–2	1–2									1–1	3–0	2–1
O'Higgins			0–3	0–1	1–3				3–2		0–0	1–1	2–0		2–2		0–2	1–3	
Palestino			0–2		1–4	3–1			1–2			1–5	2–2	1–0	0–1				3–0
Puerto Montt	3–3	0–3			0–1	0–1	1–1		2–3				4–1	3–1					4–0
Rangers	2–2	3–0		1–2			2–0	1–3	1–0							1–2		1–3	
S. Morning		1–2	1–1	1–1	0–3		1–3		2–2	0–3			4–3		1–0			0–0	
U. Católica	5–2			2–0					2–0			1–1	2–1			0–2		2–1	0–2
U. Chile		2–2			1–3				2–1	2–2	2–1	2–1		2–0			2–1	1–0	
U. Concepción	2–2		1–0	2–1	3–2			2–2			3–2	2–2	1–3	1–0	1–1				
U. Española				3–0	1–0		3–3	1–0			2–3	3–1					1–0		1–0
S. Wanderers		1–2	3–0			2–1		1–0		0–0			1–1	2–0		0–1	1–4		

=== Group standings ===
==== Group A ====
Pos	Team	Pld	W	D	L	GF	GA	GD	Pts	Qualification
1	Universidad de Concepción	18	9	6	3	31	23	+8	33	Qualify to the playoffs
2	Audax Italiano	18	9	5	4	32	22	+10	32	Qualify to the playoffs
3	Universidad Católica	18	9	5	4	27	20	+7	32	Qualify to the repechaje
4	Cobresal	18	6	4	8	26	32	−6	22	
5	Santiago Wanderers	18	5	2	11	16	30	−14	17	

==== Group B ====
Pos	Team	Pld	W	D	L	GF	GA	GD	Pts	Qualification
1	Universidad de Chile	18	10	5	3	27	20	+7	35	Qualify to the playoffs
2	La Serena	18	5	7	6	32	31	+1	22	Qualify to the repechaje
3	Everton	18	5	6	7	20	27	−7	21	
4	Coquimbo Unido	18	3	8	7	16	26	−10	17	
5	Santiago Morning	18	2	6	10	15	31	−16	12	

==== Group C ====
Pos	Team	Pld	W	D	L	GF	GA	GD	Pts	Qualification
1	Colo-Colo	18	13	1	4	54	22	+32	40	Qualify to the playoffs
2	Cobreloa	18	9	3	6	32	24	+8	30	Qualify to the playoffs
3	Unión Española	18	8	4	6	24	21	+3	28	Qualify to the repechaje
4	Deportes Antofagasta	18	5	6	7	26	31	−5	21	
5	Deportes Puerto Montt	18	4	5	9	33	32	+1	17	

==== Group D ====
Pos	Team	Pld	W	D	L	GF	GA	GD	Pts	Qualification
1	Huachipato	18	11	3	4	32	19	+13	36	Qualify to the playoffs
2	O'Higgins	18	5	6	7	26	31	−5	21	Qualify to the repechaje
3	Palestino	18	4	4	10	22	35	−13	16	
4	Rangers	18	4	4	10	26	40	−14	16	

==== Repechaje ====
Match	Home	Visitor	Result
1	Unión Española *	Deportes La Serena	2–2
2	Universidad Católica *	O'Higgins	1–1

* both teams qualified due to better position in the Regular season

=== Aggregate table ===
Pos	Team	Pld	W	D	L	GF	GA	GD	Pts	Qualification
1	Colo-Colo	18	13	1	4	54	22	+32	40	Copa Sudamericana First Stage
2	Huachipato	18	11	3	4	32	19	+13	36	Copa Sudamericana Preliminary Stage
3	Universidad de Chile	18	10	5	3	27	20	+7	35	
4	Universidad de Concepción	18	9	6	3	31	23	+8	33	
5	Audax Italiano	18	9	5	4	32	22	+10	32	
6	Universidad Católica	18	9	5	4	27	20	+7	32	
7	Cobreloa	18	9	3	6	32	24	+8	30	
8	Unión Española	18	8	4	6	24	21	+3	28	
9	Deportes La Serena	18	5	7	6	32	31	+1	22	
10	Cobresal	18	6	4	8	26	32	−6	22	
11	O'Higgins	18	5	6	7	26	31	−5	21	
12	Everton	18	5	6	7	20	27	−7	21	
13	Deportes Antofagasta	18	5	6	7	26	31	−5	21	
14	Deportes Puerto Montt	18	4	5	9	33	32	+1	17	
15	Coquimbo Unido	18	3	8	7	16	26	−10	17	
16	Santiago Wanderers	18	5	2	11	16	30	−14	17	
17	Palestino	18	4	4	10	22	35	−13	16	
18	Rangers	18	4	4	10	26	40	−14	16	
19	Santiago Morning	18	2	6	10	15	31	−16	12	

== Playoffs ==
Quarterfinals
2	Huachipato	1	4	5
7	Cobreloa	3	0	3
3	Universidad de Chile	2	3	5
5	Universidad Católica	2	1	3
4	U. de Concepción	2	2	4
5	Audax Italiano	1	0	1
1	Colo-Colo	4	5	9
8	Unión Española	0	0	0

Semifinals
2	Huachipato	1	2	3
3	Universidad de Chile	6	2	8
4	U. de Concepción	3	0	3
1	Colo-Colo	4	2	6

Finals
3	Universidad de Chile	1	1	2 (2)
1	Colo-Colo	2	0	2 (4)

2006 Apertura winners
Colo-Colo
24th title

== Top goalscorers ==
Rank	Player	Club	Goals
1	(Chile) Humberto Suazo	Colo-Colo	19
2	(Chile) Matías Fernández	Colo-Colo	14
3	(Chile) Juan Quiroga	Cobresal	13
3	(Chile) Leonardo Monje	Deportes Puerto Montt	13
4	(Chile) Rodrigo Millar	Huachipato	12
4	(Chile) Héctor Mancilla	Colo-Colo	12
5	(Colombia) Herly Alcázar	Universidad de Chile	11
6	(Argentina) José Luis Díaz	Cobreloa	10
6	(Chile) Carlos Villanueva	Audax Italiano	10
