= Gajardo =

Gajardo is a surname. Notable people with the surname include:

- Blanca Esperanza Lewin Gajardo (born 1974), Chilean actress
- Carlos Gajardo (born 1976), Chilean footballer
- Eduardo Gajardo (born 1990), Chilean freestyle wrestler
- Fernando Alberto Hormazábal Gajardo (born 1935), Chilean military officer, engineer, academic, and consultant
- Francisco Andrés Silva Gajardo (born 1986), Chilean footballer
- Jenaro Gajardo Vera (1919–1998), Chilean lawyer, painter, and poet
- Leo Gajardo (born 1968), Chilean footballer
- Luis Alberto Vidal Gajardo (born 1952), Chilean footballer
- María Eugenia Mella Gajardo (born 1952), Chilean politician
- María Gatica Gajardo (born 1962), Chilean politician
- Oscar Gajardo (1899–1970), Chilean lawyer, politician, and public administrator
- Renán Patricio Sánchez Gajardo (1945–2022), Chilean singer
- Rubén Gajardo (politician) (born 1936), Chilean politician
- Rubén Gajardo (tennis) (born 1968), Chilean tennis player
- Santiago Gajardo (1932–2006), Chilean commercial engineer and politician
- Sergio Muñoz Gajardo (born 1957), Chilean lawyer
