= Carlos Aránguiz =

Chilean judge (1953–2021)

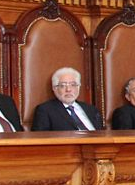
- Born: 18 September 1953; Chile
- Died: 3 January 2021 (aged 67); Chile
- Education: University of Chile
- Occupations: Judge, writer, academic
- Employer: Judiciary of Chile
- Known for: Minister of the Supreme Court of Chile

Carlos Ramón Aránguiz Zúñiga (18 September 1953 – 3 January 2021) was a Chilean judge who served on the Supreme Court.

== Judicial career ==
Carlos Aránguiz completed his secondary education at the Liceo Valentín Letelier de Santiago and subsequently studied Law at the University of Chile. His judicial career began as a clerk at the First Criminal Court of Valparaíso. He later served as presiding judge in the 1st Civil Court of Los Andes, the 2nd Civil Court of San Felipe, the 1st Labor Court of Valparaíso, and the 6th Criminal Court of Santiago, and as prosecutor at the Court of Appeals of Coyhaique.

In 2001, he was appointed minister of the Court of Appeals of Rancagua. Aránguiz gained national prominence in 2002 when, as judge-in-charge (ministro en visita) of the so-called Caso Coimas, a corruption scandal involving multiple members of parliament and government officials under President Ricardo Lagos Escobar, he— for the first time in Chilean history—obtained the impeachment of five deputies. He presided over the Court of Appeals of Rancagua on four occasions, the last during the 2011–2012 judicial year.

After being nominated by President Sebastián Piñera and unanimously confirmed by the Senate, he took office as a minister of the Supreme Court on 28 January 2014, filling the seat vacated by Gabriela Pérez. He served on the Fourth, Third, and First Chambers of Chile’s highest tribunal and chaired the Clear Language Commission within the Judiciary. He remained in this position until his death from pulmonary fibrosis on 3 January 2021.

== Literary and academic career ==
Alongside his judicial work, Aránguiz distinguished himself as a writer of short story, novel, and poetry. A significant portion of his literary output is set in and inspired by the Aysén Region of Patagonia, where he lived from 1989 to 2000.

His books have been translated into English, Portuguese, and German, and his first two works were declared supplementary material for education by the Mineduc. He was a member of the Society of Writers of Chile and the Chilean Academy of Language. He also founded the literary magazine Francachela.

He also served as an academic in the Faculties of Law at the University of Los Lagos and the Universidad Andrés Bello.

== Works ==
- Cuentos de la Carretera Austral (short stories, 1991)
- Aysén: La estación del olvido (novel, 1992)
- Desde Aysén y otros casi-poemas (poetry, 1995)
- Cuentos bioceánicos (short stories, 1997)
- De cordilleras y alevines (poetry, 1997)
- Piel de naufragios (poetry, 1999)
- Defensa de Lot (poetry, 2007)
- La condesa de la Patagonia (novel, 2008)
- El muérdago y otros afanes truncos (short stories, 2017)
