= Marcos Libedinsky =

Chilean judge (1933–2021)

President of the Supreme Court of Chile
- In office 6 January 2004 – 6 January 2006
- President: Ricardo Lagos
- Preceded by: Mario Garrido Montt
- Succeeded by: Enrique Tapia Witting

Personal details
- Born: 13 February 1933
- Died: 22 August 2021 (aged 88)
- Education: University of Chile Faculty of Law
- Profession: Judge

Marcos Libedinsky Tschorne (13 February 1933 – 22 August 2021) was a Chilean judge who served as president of the Supreme Court.

Born to Isidoro Libedinsky and Aida Tschorne, his family was of Jewish origin. He studied at the Liceo Manuel de Salas and the Instituto Nacional General José Miguel Carrera, and later earned his law degree from the Faculty of Law of the University of Chile.

He joined the Judiciary of Chile in 1966 and was appointed minister of the Court of Appeal of Santiago in 1975.

In 1993 he was appointed minister of the Supreme Court of Chile by President Patricio Aylwin. In December 2003 he was elected President of the Supreme Court, a position he held from 2004 to 2006. During his tenure, the implementation of the Criminal Procedure Reform was completed in the country through its entry into force in the Santiago Metropolitan Region, and the installation of the Family Courts began.

He also taught at the law faculties of the University of Chile and the Universidad Gabriela Mistral.

== Death ==
Libedinsky died on 22 August 2021 at the age of 88. The plenary of the Supreme Court declared three days of mourning.
