= José Alfonso Cavada =

Chilean lawyer, judge and politician (1832–1909)

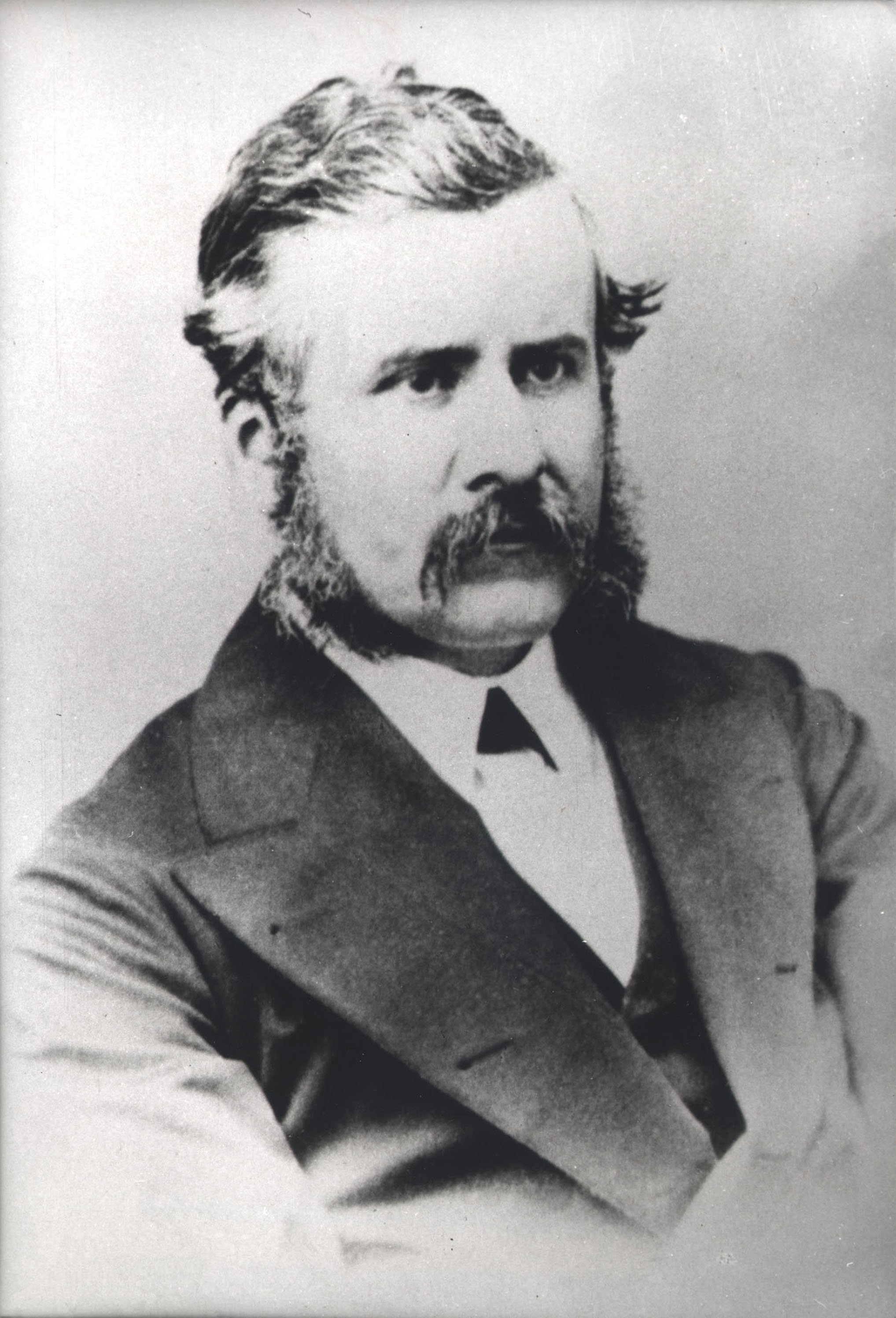

President of the Supreme Court
- In office 1902–1902
- President: Germán Riesco
- Preceded by: Ramón Huidobro
- Succeeded by: Galvarino Gallardo Font
- In office 1895–1895
- President: Jorge Montt
- Preceded by: Carlos Risopatrón
- Succeeded by: Andrés Sanhueza

Minister of Finance
- In office 19 June 1880 – 18 September 1881
- President: Aníbal Pinto
- Preceded by: Augusto Matte Pérez
- Succeeded by: Luis Aldunate Carrera

Minister of Foreign Affairs
- In office 1876–1878
- President: Federico Errázuriz Zañartu; Aníbal Pinto
- Preceded by: Enrique Cood
- Succeeded by: Alejandro Fierro

Personal details
- Born: José Andrés Alfonso Cavada; February 4, 1832 La Serena, Chile
- Died: March 23, 1909 (aged 77) Santiago, Chile
- Party: Radical
- Education: University of Chile
- Occupation: Lawyer, judge, politician

José Andrés Alfonso Cavada (4 February 1832 – 23 March 1909), commonly known as José Alfonso Cavada, was a Chilean lawyer, judge and politician.

He served as minister of foreign affairs from 1876 to 1878, minister of finance from 1880 to 1881, and twice as president of the Supreme Court, in 1895 and 1902.

== Early life ==
Alfonso was born in La Serena on 4 February 1832, the son of Manuel Alfonso Rodríguez and Agustina Cavada Meléndez.

He studied at the Liceo de La Serena and later at the Instituto Nacional in Santiago. He subsequently studied law at the University of Chile and was admitted to the bar on 20 June 1855.

After qualifying as a lawyer, he practiced law in Valparaíso from 1856.

In 1862, Alfonso was appointed judge of commerce in Valparaíso. He also served as president of the Tribunal of Confiscations and Claims and participated in the municipal government of Valparaíso.

In 1866, the Chilean government commissioned him to draft regulations governing the Commercial Registry and to prepare a new customs ordinance.

== Public career ==
=== Minister of State ===
A member of the Radical Party, Alfonso entered the cabinet as minister of foreign affairs during the 1870s. The appointment of Alfonso, a Radical, to the Foreign Ministry marked the Radical Party's entry into the governing alliance with the Liberals.

The Ministry of Foreign Affairs records his tenure from 1876 to 1878, succeeding Enrique Cood and preceding Alejandro Fierro Pérez. His tenure spanned the governments of presidents Federico Errázuriz Zañartu and Aníbal Pinto.

During the War of the Pacific, Alfonso was appointed war auditor of the Chilean army operating in northern Chile. He was also involved in Chilean intelligence activities during the conflict.

On 19 June 1880, President Aníbal Pinto appointed him minister of finance, succeeding Augusto Matte Pérez. Alfonso remained in office until 18 September 1881, when the presidency of Domingo Santa María began, and was succeeded by Luis Aldunate Carrera.

=== Diplomatic activity ===
In 1889, Alfonso was appointed a Chilean representative to the First International Conference of American States in Washington, D.C., held between 1889 and 1890. His son, lawyer Paulino Alfonso, accompanied him as secretary.

=== Judicial career ===
Alfonso subsequently pursued a career in the higher courts of the Chilean judiciary. In 1892, he was appointed a justice of the Supreme Court of Chile.

In 1895, Alfonso became president of the Supreme Court for the first time, succeeding Carlos Risopatrón. He served during the government of President Jorge Montt and was succeeded in 1896 by Andrés Sanhueza.

Alfonso served as president of the Supreme Court for a second time in 1902, during the government of President Germán Riesco. He succeeded Ramón Huidobro and was succeeded in 1903 by Galvarino Gallardo Font.

The records of the Chilean judiciary list Alfonso as a member of the Supreme Court from 1892 to 1904.

He later served as a member of the Council of State.

== Personal life ==
Alfonso married Leticia del Barrio Lurquín at the parish of El Sagrario in Santiago on 24 May 1858. Their children included lawyer, academic and politician Paulino Alfonso del Barrio.

Alfonso died in Santiago on 23 March 1909, aged 77.
