= President of the Supreme Court (Chile) =

President of the Supreme Court of Chile of Supreme Court of Chile
- Presidenta de la Excelentísima Corte Suprema de Justicia
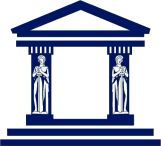

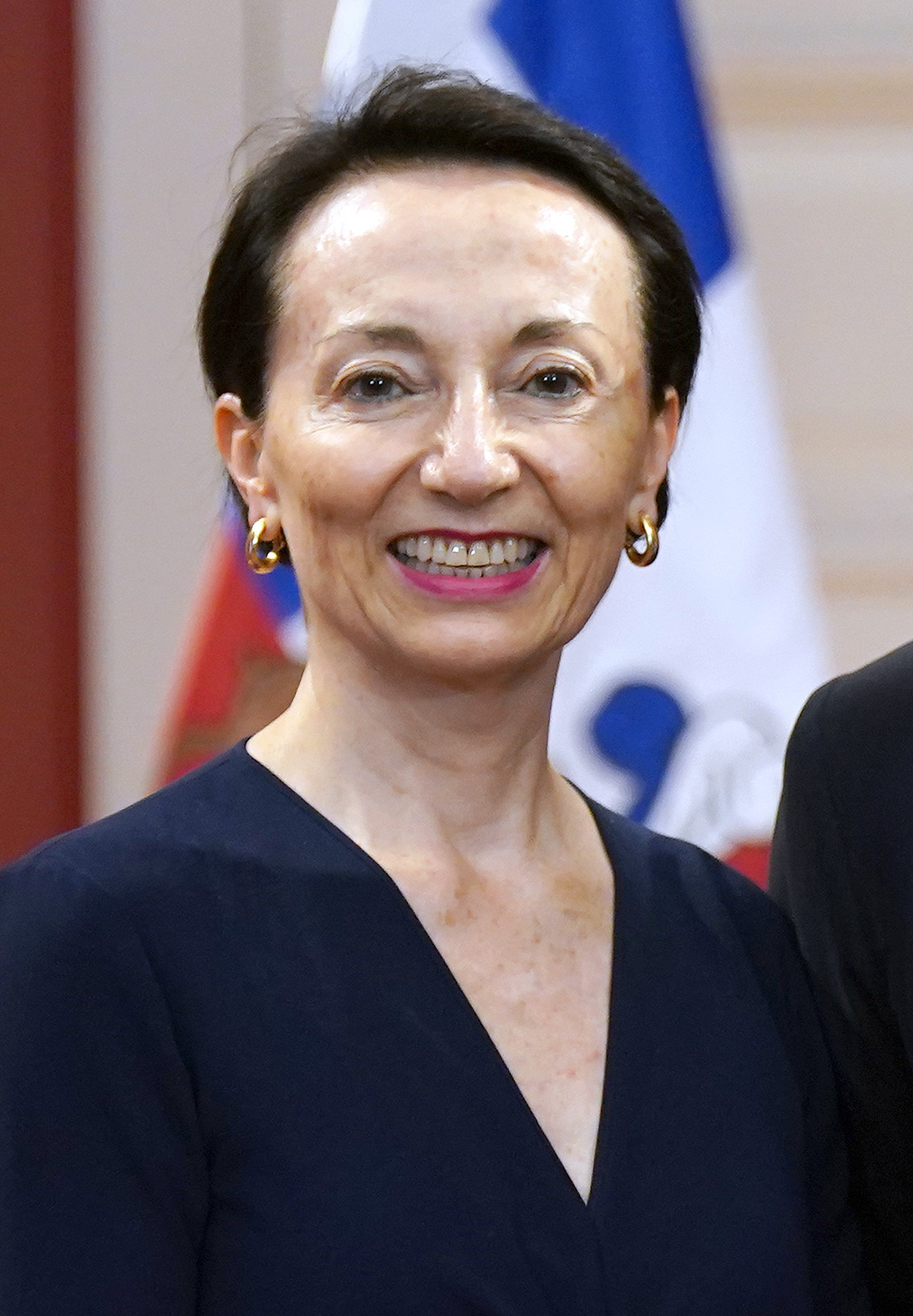
- Incumbent; Gloria Ana Chevesich since 6 January 2026
- Residence: None official
- Seat: Palace of Justice, Santiago
- Appointer: Supreme Court of Chile
- Term length: 2 years, non-renewable
- Formation: 29 December 1823
- First holder: José Gregorio Argomedo
- Website: Official website

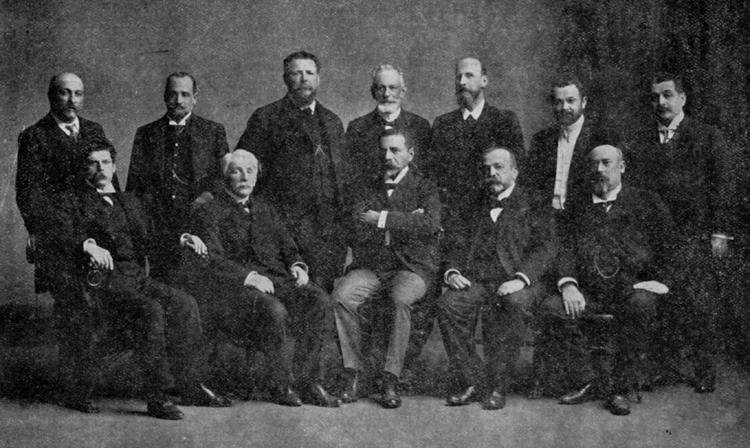
Members of the Supreme Court circa 1908

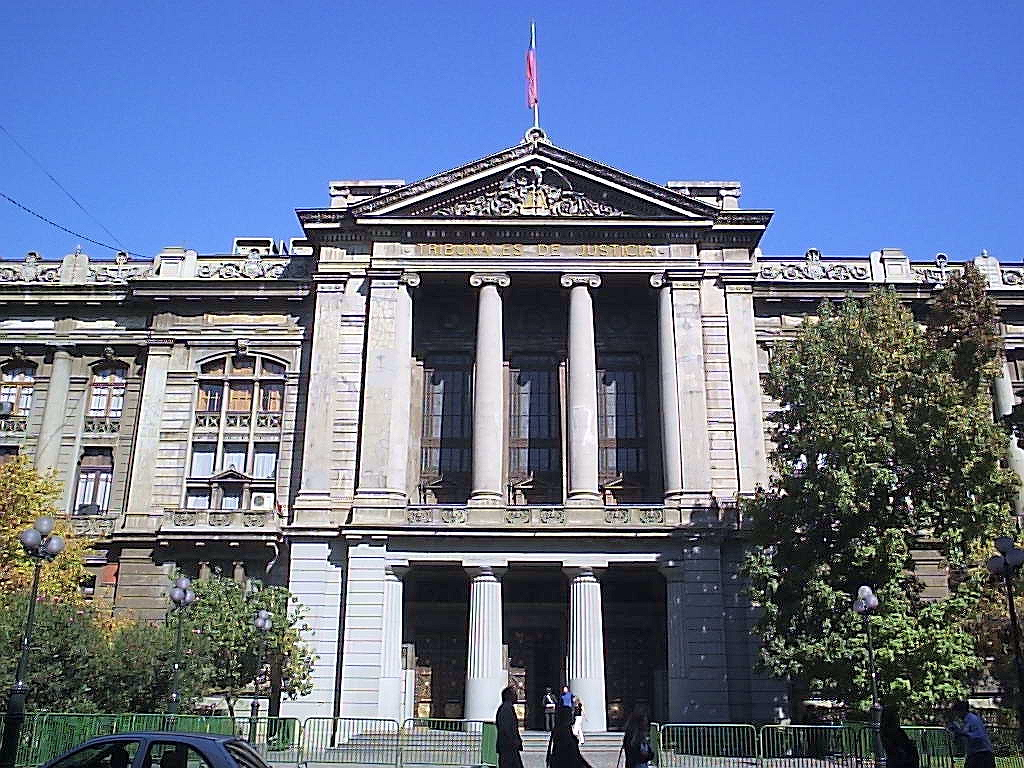
Supreme Court building in Santiago

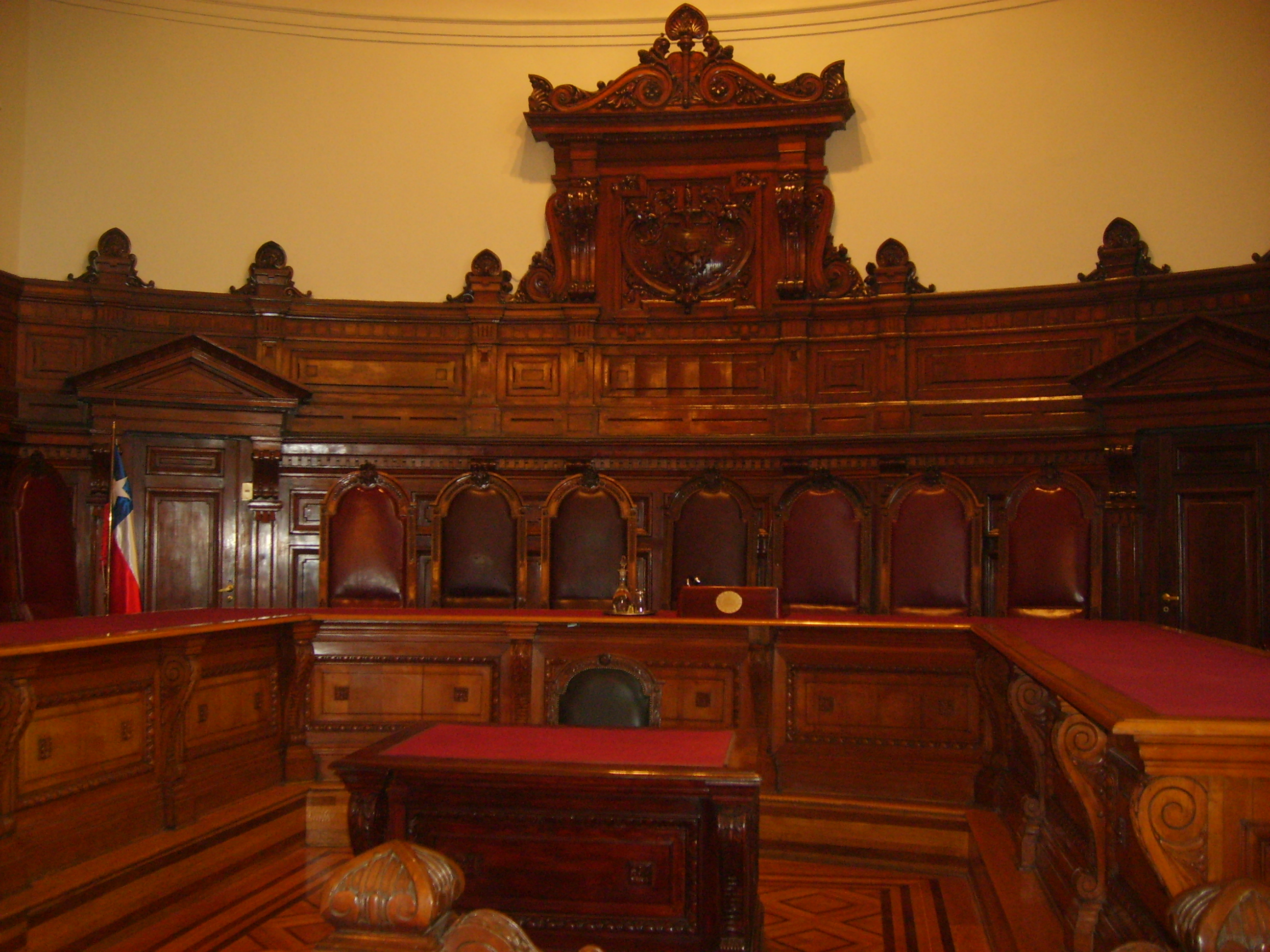
Meeting room of the Supreme Court

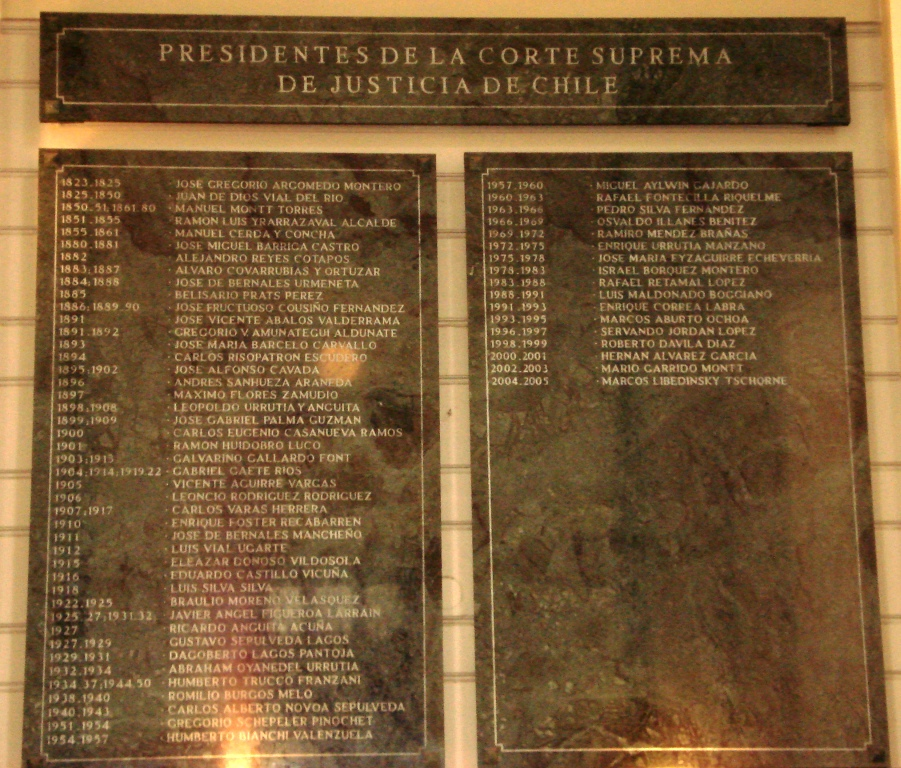
Memorial plaque with list of the presidents of Supreme Court

The President of the Supreme Court of Chile, officially the President of the Most Excellent Supreme Court of Justice (Spanish: Presidenta de la Excelentísima Corte Suprema de Justicia), is the member of the Supreme Court of Chile responsible for presiding over it. The president is elected by the court itself from among its members and serves a two-year term, with no possibility of re-election. The duties of the office are defined in Section 2 of Title VI of the Código Orgánico de Tribunales (Organic Code of Courts).

== Duties ==
=== Direction of the Supreme Court ===
The president's primary duty is to lead the Supreme Court. In this capacity, the president is responsible for:

- Exercising, with respect to the Supreme Court, the following powers that the Organic Code of Courts grants to the presidents of the Courts of Appeals:
  - Presiding over the court in all its public sessions;
  - Convening the chambers daily for operation, summoning officials as necessary to constitute them;
  - Opening and closing court sessions, extending or shortening sitting hours when urgent matters require it, and calling extraordinary sessions when necessary;
  - Maintaining order within the courtroom, admonishing anyone who disrupts proceedings and removing them from the chamber if required;
  - Directing the court's deliberations, granting the floor to members who request it;
  - Setting the questions to be debated and the propositions to be put to a vote;
  - Calling a vote on matters under discussion once the court has declared debate closed;
- Drawing up the docket for each chamber in order of priority assigned to cases, and distributing the workload among the court's rapporteurs and other staff;
- Attending to the daily dispatch of business and issuing procedural orders and decrees in matters within the court's jurisdiction or that of any of its chambers;
- Overseeing the maintenance of the general roll of cases admitted to the court and of special rolls for cases classified as urgent or ordinary;
- Directing the compilation of judicial statistics for the Supreme Court and the Courts of Appeals, based on the bimonthly reports submitted by the latter;
- Taking appropriate measures to ensure that cases before the Supreme Court and the Courts of Appeals are decided within the statutory time limits, and ensuring that the Courts of Appeals fulfil the same obligation with respect to cases before the judges within their respective territorial jurisdictions;
- Hearing and resolving complaints lodged against subordinate staff of the Supreme Court;
- Designating a member of the court to remain on duty during the judicial recess.

=== Single-judge and special jurisdiction ===
Under Article 53 of the Organic Code of Courts, the President of the Supreme Court also acts as a single-judge court of exception, constituted as such whenever a case assigned by law to this jurisdiction arises. The president has jurisdiction to hear and decide at first instance:

- Cases concerning the removal of judges of the Courts of Appeals;
- Civil lawsuits brought against one or more members or judicial prosecutors of the Courts of Appeals to enforce their legal liability for acts committed in the exercise of their functions;
- Prize cases and other matters to be adjudicated under international law;
- Any other matters assigned to this jurisdiction by statute.

Appeals against judgments issued by the President of the Supreme Court are heard by one of the court's chambers, except in removal cases, which fall to the Supreme Court sitting in plenary session (excluding the President).

== Presidents of the Supreme Court ==
No.	Picture	Name	University	Notes	Period
1		Gregorio Argomedo	Real Universidad de San Felipe	First president of the Supreme Court of Chile.	1823–1825
2		Juan de Dios Vial del Río	Real Universidad de San Felipe		1825–1850
3		Manuel Montt	Real Universidad de San Felipe	Served this first term before becoming President of Chile.	1850–1851
4		Ramón Luis Irarrázaval	Real Universidad de San Felipe	Also served as Minister of the Interior and Minister of Foreign Affairs.	1851–1855
5		Manuel Cerda y Concha	Real Universidad de San Felipe		1855–1861
6		Manuel Montt Torres	Real Universidad de San Felipe	After serving as President of the Republic, he returned to preside over the Supreme Court in this second term until his death. He is the only person to have held both offices.	1861–1880
7		José Miguel Barriga	Instituto Nacional	Served on the revision commission of the Civil Code of Chile alongside Andrés Bello, was one of the founding judges of the Court of Appeals of Concepción, and served as a member of the Chamber of Deputies of Chile.	1880–1881
8		Alejandro Reyes Cotapos	University of Chile	Also served as a parliamentarian and minister of state.	1882
9		Álvaro Covarrubias	University of Chile	Also served as a parliamentarian and minister of state; ran as a candidate for President of the Republic in 1871. First term.	1883
10		José Bernales Urmeneta	Real Universidad de San Felipe	First term.	1884
11		Belisario Prats Pérez		Served as minister of state in the final days of President José Manuel Balmaceda's government.	1885
12		José Cousiño		First term.	1886
13		Álvaro Covarrubias	University of Chile	Second term.	1887
14		José Bernales Urmeneta	Real Universidad de San Felipe	Second term.	1888
15		José Cousiño		Second term.	1889–1890
16		Vicente Ábalos			1891
17		Gregorio Amunátegui	University of Chile		1891–1893
18		José María Barceló	University of Chile	Served as parliamentarian, minister of state, and dean of the University of Chile Faculty of Law.	1893
19		Carlos Risopatrón	University of Chile		1894
20		José Alfonso Cavada	University of Chile	Also served as minister of state. First term.	1895
21		Andrés Sanhueza			1896
22		Máximo Flores			1897
23		Leopoldo Urrutia	University of Chile	First term.	1898
24		Gabriel Palma Guzmán		First term.	1899
25		Carlos Casanueva Ramos			1900
26		Ramón Huidobro	University of Chile		1901
27		José Alfonso Cavada	University of Chile	Second term.	1902
28		Galvarino Gallardo Font		First term.	1903
29		Gabriel Gaete		First term.	1904
30		Vicente Aguirre Vargas			1905
31		Leoncio Rodríguez			1906
32		Carlos Varas Herrera		First term.	1907
33		Leopoldo Urrutia	University of Chile	Second term.	1908
34		Gabriel Palma Guzmán		Second term.	1909
35		Enrique Foster			1910
36		José de Bernales Mancheño			1911
37		Luis Vial			1912
38		Galvarino Gallardo Font		Second term.	1913
39		Gabriel Gaete		Second term.	1914
40		Eleazar Donoso			1915
41		Eduardo Castillo Vicuña			1916
42		Carlos Varas Herrera		Second term.	1917
43		Luis Silva			1918
44		Gabriel Gaete		Third term.	1919–1922
45		Braulio Moreno			1922–1925
46		Javier Figueroa	University of Chile	Brother of President Emiliano Figueroa Larraín. Was exiled by Carlos Ibáñez del Campo. First term.	1925–1927
47		Felipe Anguita			1927
48		Gustavo Sepúlveda			1927–1929
49		Dagoberto Lagos			1929–1931
50		Javier Figueroa	University of Chile	Reinstated by President Juan Esteban Montero. Second term.	1931–1932
51		Abraham Oyanedel	University of Chile	Served as Vice President of Chile following the events of 1932, transferring power to Arturo Alessandri Palma. Together with Manuel Montt, he is the only President of the Court to have also served as head of state.	1932–1935
52		Humberto Trucco	University of Chile	First term.	1934–1937
53		Romilio Burgos			1938–1940
54		Carlos Novoa			1940–1943
55		Humberto Trucco	University of Chile	Second term.	1944–1950
56		Gregorio Schepeler			1951–1954
57		Humberto Bianchi			1954–1957
58		Miguel Aylwin	University of Chile	Father of President of the Republic Patricio Aylwin.	1957–1960
59		Rafael Fontecilla			1960–1963
60		Pedro Silva			1963–1966
61		Osvaldo Illanes			1966–1969
62		Ramiro Méndez			1969–1972
63		Enrique Urrutia Manzano	University of Concepción	Issued numerous complaints against the government of Salvador Allende. Gave his approval to the 1973 Chilean coup d'état. Was the first president to have studied at the University of Concepción.	1972–1975
64		José María Eyzaguirre			1975–1978
65		Israel Bórquez		In 2016, the Chamber of Deputies declared him a "national disgrace" and requested the Judiciary remove images of the late judge from its premises and hold no tributes in his honour, due to his conduct opposing the extradition of Manuel Contreras.	1978–1983
66		Rafael Retamal	Pontifical Catholic University of Chile		1983–1988
67		Luis Maldonado			1988–1991
68		Enrique Correa Labra	University of Chile		1991–1993
69		Marcos Aburto	University of Chile	After his term, served as an appointed senator.	1993–1995
70		Servando Jordán	University of Chile		1996–1997
71		Roberto Dávila	Pontifical Catholic University of Chile		1998–1999
72		Hernán Álvarez	University of Chile		2000–2001
73		Mario Garrido	University of Chile	Distinguished jurist and author of numerous publications on criminal law, including a four-volume work.	2002–2003
74		Marcos Libedinsky	University of Chile		2004–2005
75		Enrique Tapia Witting	University of Concepción		2006 – 6 January 2008
76		Urbano Marín	University of Chile	First president of the Supreme Court without a judicial career background.	6 January 2008 – 18 December 2009
77		Milton Juica	University of Chile		18 December 2009 – 6 January 2012
78		Rubén Ballesteros	University of Valparaíso	The first president to have studied at what is now the University of Valparaíso.	6 January 2012 – 5 January 2014
79		Sergio Muñoz Gajardo	Pontifical Catholic University of Valparaíso	The first president to have studied at the Pontifical Catholic University of Valparaíso. Later impeached and removed from office by the Senate on 16 October 2024 following a constitutional accusation for "notable abandono de deberes" (notable neglect of duties).	6 January 2014 – 5 January 2016
80		Hugo Dolmestch	University of Concepción		5 January 2016 – 8 January 2018
81		Haroldo Brito	University of Valparaíso		8 January 2018 – 2020
82		Guillermo Silva	University of Concepción		6 January 2020 – 2022
83		Juan Eduardo Fuentes	University of Concepción		2022 – 2024
84		Ricardo Blanco	University of Chile		2024 – 2025
85		Gloria Ana Chevesich	University of Chile	First woman to hold the office.	6 January 2026 – present

== See also ==
- Supreme Court of Chile
