= Marcos Aburto =

Chilean judge (1916–2008)

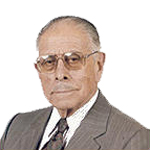

Designed Senator
- In office 11 March 1998 – 11 March 2006
- Succeeded by: Dissolution of the Office

President of the Supreme Court of Chile
- In office 6 January 1993 – 6 January 1995
- President: Eduardo Frei Ruiz-Tagle
- Preceded by: Enrique Correa Labra
- Succeeded by: Servando Jordán

Personal details
- Born: 25 May 1916 Valdivia, Chile
- Died: 5 June 2008 (aged 92) Santiago, Chile
- Spouse: Carmela Contardo
- Children: Five
- Parent(s): Manuel Aburto; Efrena Ochoa
- Education: University of Chile (LL.B)
- Occupation: Lawyer

Marcos Aurelio Aburto Ochoa (born 25 May 1916 in Valdivia – 5 June 2008 in Santiago) was a Chilean lawyer who served as senator after being designated by president Eduardo Frei Ruíz-Tagle. Similarly, he was minister of the Supreme Court of Chile from 1994 to 1993, when he became its president until 1995.

== Early life ==
Aburto was the son of Manuel Aburto Aburto and Efrena Verónica Ochoa Ochoa. He studied at the Instituto Salesiano de Valdivia and then at the Liceo Fiscal de Valdivia. In 1936 he entered the University of Chile and graduated in 1941, obtaining the title of lawyer and sworn in on July 14, 1943. His thesis was titled: "De las operaciones sobre warrants: cuestiones a que ellas dan lugar" ("On operations on warrants: issues to which they give rise").

Aburto was married to Carmela Contardo Müchall and was the father of 5 children: Marcos, Manuel, Marcelo, Miguel, Mario and Jaime.

He died on 5 June 2008 at the age of 92.

== Public life ==
From 1941 to 1945 Aburto freely practiced his profession in Santiago. He dedicated himself to civil, commercial and constitutional matters.

At the same time, between 1956 and 1964, he dedicated himself to teaching, being a professor of Commercial Law at the Universidad Técnica del Estado, Valdivia Campus. Likewise, in those years, he was an ad honorem professor of Civic Education at the Instituto Salesiano de Valdivia.

He entered the Judiciary of Chile on January 29, 1945 as a Court Judge in San José de la Mariquina, Valdivia. The following year, in 1946, he was appointed secretary of the Court of Letters of Punta Arenas, and in June of that same year he was appointed Judge of Letters of Achao, Chiloé. Later, that same year he was appointed the Judge of Leters of Mulchén, Bio Bío.

In 1960, he was appointed Minister of the Court of Appeals of Valdivia and in 1964 he moved as Minister to the Court of Appeals of Santiago.

Between 1966 and 1972 he was a member of the Martial Court of Santiago and was its president on three occasions.

Between 1968 and 1970 he was minister of the Agrarian Court of Appeals of Santiago.

In August 1974, he was appointed as minister of the Supreme Court of Chile, being its president in the period 1993 and 1995.

He was a representative for seven years (until 1985) of the Supreme Court in the National Television Council, before retiring according to a recent reform in 1997 at the age of 75.

The Supreme Court of Chile appointed him to the position of institutional senator from 1998 to 2006.
