= Forms of address in Chile =

Forms of Address

The forms of address in Chile were established by the Ministry of Foreign Affairs and refer to other various laws on the matter. In practice, the correct forms of address are reserved for the most formal documents, as is the case with current President of the lower chamber of Congress, who is normally addressed as simply 'Señor Diego Paulsen Kehr', without the styles of Excellency and Honourable which he is entitled to.

== Executive ==
Authority or institution	Epistolary address	Personal address	On envelopes
President of the Republic	Most Excellent Mr/Madam President of the Republic Your Excellency	Excellency or Mr/Madam President or President	His Excellency the President of the Republic
Former President of the Republic	Most Excellent Mr/Madam Your Excellency	Mr/Madam President or President	His Excellency the former President of the Republic
Ministers of State	Mr/Madam Minister Your Honour	Minister	Mr/Madam Minister
Undersecretary of State	Mr/Madam Undersecretary Your Honour	Undersecretary	Mr/Madam Undersecretary

== Legislature ==
Authority or institution	Epistolary address	Personal address	On envelopes
President of the Senate	The Most Excellent Mr/Madam Your Excellency	Mr/Madam or President or Senator	His Excellency the President of the Senate
President of the Chamber of Deputies	The Most Excellent Mr/Madam Your Excellency	Mr/Madam or President or Deputy	His Excellency the President of the Honourable Chamber of Deputies
Senators	Honourable Mr/Madam Senator Your Honour	Senator	Honourable Mr/Madam Senator
Deputies	Honourable Mr/Madam Deputy Your Honour	Deputy	Honourable Mr/Madam Deputy

== Judiciary ==
Authority or institution	Epistolary address	Personal address	On envelopes
Supreme Court of Justice	The Most Excellent Supreme Court of Justice	Supreme Court	The Most Excellent Supreme Court of Justice
President of the Supreme Court of Justice	Most Excellent Mr/Madam Your Excellency	Mr/Madam or President	His Excellency
Minister of the Supreme Court of Justice	Most Excellent Mr/Madam Your Excellency	Magistrate	His Excellency
Court of Appeals	Most Illustrious Court of Appeals	Court of Appeals	The Illustrious Court of Appeals
President of the Court of Appeals	Most Illustrious Mr/Madam	Mr/Madam Minister or Magistrate	Most Illustrious Mr/Madam
Minister of the Court of Appeals	Most Illustrious Mr/Madam Your Honour	Mr/Madam Minister or Magistrate	Most Illustrious Mr/Madam
Judge	His Honour Your Honour	Mr/Madam Judge or Magistrate	His Honour

== Regional government ==
Authority or institution	Epistolary address	Personal address	On envelopes
Regional Governor	Mr/Madam Governor Your Honour	Mr/Madam or Governor	Mr/Madam Governor (of the ... (Note: Name of the Region) Region)
Regional Ministerial Secretary (SEREMI)	SEREMI ... (Note: Portfolio)	SEREMI	Mr/Madam SEREMI ...
Regional Board member (Councillor)	Councillor ... (Note: First lastname)	Councillor	Mr/Madam Councillor
Regional Director	Mr/Madam Director ... (Note: Service)	Director	Mr/Madam Director ...

== Local government ==
Authority or institution	Epistolary address	Personal address	On envelopes
Municipalities	The Most Illustrious Municipality of ... (Note: Name of the Commune) or Illustrious Municipality of ...	—	Illustrious Municipality of ...
Mayors	Mr/Madam Mayor Your Honour	Mr/Madam or Mayor	Mr/Madam Mayor (of the I. Municipality of ...)
City Council member (Councilman) (Note: Or 'Councilwoman' if female)	Councilman ...	Councilman	Mr/Madam Councilman

== Armed Forces ==
Autoridad o institución	Trato epistolar	Trato personal	Para referirse a:
Commander in Chief of the Army of Chile	Mr/Madam General of the Army Your Honour	Mr/Madam General or General	Mr/Madam Commander in Chief of the Army
Commander in Chief of the Navy of Chile	Mr/Madam Admiral Your Honour	Mr/Madam Admiral or Admiral	Mr/Madam Commander in Chief of the Navy
Commander in Chief of the Air Force of Chile	Mr/Madam Air General Your Honour	Mr/Madam General or General	Mr/Madam Commander in Chief of the Air Force
General Director of the Carabiniers de Chile	Mr/Madam General Director of Carabiniers Your Honour	Mr/Madam General or General	Mr/Madam General Director of Carabiniers
Director General of the Investigations Police of Chile	Mr/Madam Director General of the Investigations Police Your Honour	Mr/Madam Director or Director	Mr/Madam Director General of the Investigations Police

== Other ==
Authority or institution	Epistolary address	Personal address	On envelopes
Comptroller General of the Republic	Mr/Madam Comptroller General of the Republic Your Honour	Mr/Madam or Mr/Madam Comptroller	Mr/Madam Comptroller General of the Republic
Nacional Prosecutor of the Public Ministry	Mr/Madam National Prosecutor of the Public Ministry Your Honour	Mr/Madam or Mr/Madam Prosecutor	Mr/Madam National Prosecutor of the Public Ministry
