= Urbano Marín =

Chilean judge (1935–2021)

President of the Supreme Court of Chile
- In office 7 January 2008 – 6 January 2010
- President: Michelle Bachelet
- Preceded by: Enrique Tapia Witting
- Succeeded by: Milton Juica

Justice of the Supreme Court of Chile
- In office 21 January 1998 – 3 September 2010
- Nominated by: Eduardo Frei Ruiz-Tagle

Personal details
- Born: September 4, 1935 Santiago, Chile
- Died: May 5, 2021 (aged 85)
- Education: University of Chile
- Occupation: Lawyer, judge

Urbano Marín Vallejo (4 September 1935 – 5 May 2021) was a Chilean lawyer and judge who served as a justice of the Supreme Court of Chile from 1998 to 2010 and as president of the Supreme Court from 2008 to 2010. He also served as a member of the Constitutional Court of Chile from 2005 to 2006.

== Biography ==
Marín was born in Santiago, Chile. He attended the Instituto Nacional before enrolling at the Faculty of Law of the University of Chile in 1953. He completed his studies in 1957 and qualified as a lawyer on 6 June 1960.

Marín began his academic career at the University of Chile in 1954 as a teaching assistant in Roman law, a position he held until 1957. He was also a teaching assistant in civil law from 1955 to 1957 and, after qualifying as a lawyer, in constitutional law from 1964 to 1970.

From 1962 to 1969, he taught political and administrative organization. He served as deputy director of the Public Law Seminar from 1965 to 1966 and taught labor law and social security at the university's School of Social Work in 1967.

Marín worked at the Comptroller General of Chile, where he headed the Legal Division and later the Department of Studies. In 1975, he and Eduardo Jara founded the law firm Jara & Marín Abogados.

From 1989 to 1997, Marín served as a member of the council of the Chilean Bar Association.

== Judicial career ==
Marín's judicial career began in 1997, when he was appointed an abogado integrante (external judicial member) of the Court of Appeals of Santiago.

On 21 January 1998, President Eduardo Frei Ruiz-Tagle appointed Marín to the Supreme Court of Chile with the approval of the Senate. His appointment followed the 1997 constitutional reforms and made him one of the first Supreme Court justices appointed from outside the career judiciary.

In 2004, Marín was among the Supreme Court justices who ruled in the Karen Atala custody case. From 2005 to January 2006, he also served as a member of the Constitutional Court of Chile.

=== President of the Supreme Court ===
Marín was selected by his fellow justices to serve as president of the Supreme Court, becoming the first justice appointed from outside the career judiciary to preside over the court. He took office on 7 January 2008, succeeding Enrique Tapia Witting, and served until 6 January 2010, when he was succeeded by Milton Juica.

Marín retired from the Supreme Court on 3 September 2010 upon reaching the mandatory retirement age of 75.

== Death ==
Marín died on 5 May 2021 at the age of 85.
