= Hugo Dolmestch =

Chilean lawyer, judge, and teacher

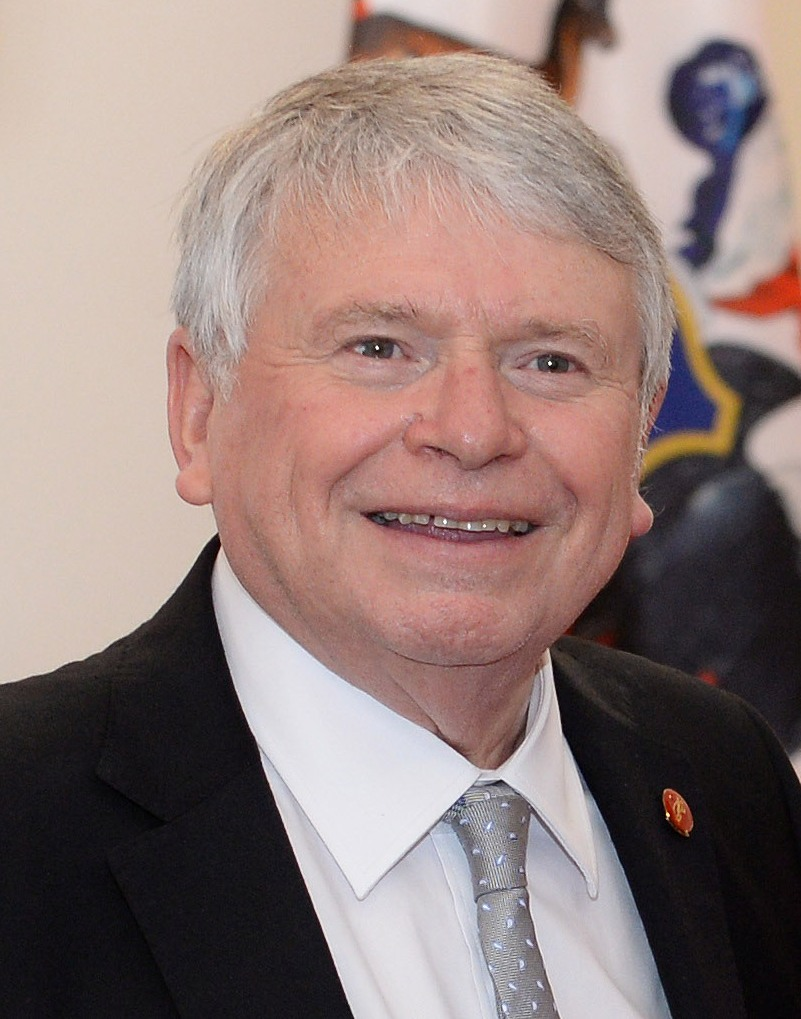

President of the Supreme Court of Chile
- In office 6 January 2016 – 8 January 2018
- President: Michelle Bachelet
- Preceded by: Sergio Muñoz Gajardo
- Succeeded by: Haroldo Brito

Minister of the Supreme Court of Chile
- In office 1 August 2006 – 29 November 2019

Personal details
- Born: Hugo Enrique Dolmestch Urra; 1 December 1944 (age 81) Parral, Chile
- Spouse: Ruth Ulloa Neira
- Occupation: Judge, lawyer, teacher

Hugo Enrique Dolmestch Urra (born 1 December 1944) is a Chilean lawyer, judge, and teacher. He was a Minister of the Supreme Court of Chile, and was its President from 2016 to 2018.

== Family and studies ==
Hugo Dolmestch was born in Parral in 1944, the son of Carlos Dolmestch Gómez and Adriana Urra Carrasco.

He completed his basic studies at the Escuela Superior de Hombres No. 1 in his hometown, and secondary studies at the Normal School of Curicó, from 1958 to 1963, where he was certified as a teacher of Basic Education. Later he entered the University of Concepción's Law School, becoming a lawyer in 1974.

He is married to Ruth Ulloa Neira.

== Judicial career ==
In December 1978, Dolmestch assumed the position of public defender of the Parral Court of Letters. He was secretary of the Río Bueno Court of Letters, judge of the Bulnes Court of Letters, rapporteur of the Chillán Courts of Appeals, and of the Supreme Court. He was appointed Minister of the Santiago Court of Appeals in 1995.

On 1 August 2006 he became a Minister of the Supreme Court of Chile, having been nominated by President Michelle Bachelet and ratified by the Senate. In that court he is a member of the Criminal Chamber, where he has had to resolve cases of soldiers involved in crimes during the military dictatorship of Augusto Pinochet, in which he has imposed the so-called "Dolmestch doctrine", which consists of granting benefits and reductions of punishment to the accused who cooperate with the investigation. This has been criticized as a "disguised amnesty" by groups of relatives of the dictatorship's victims.

On 28 May 2012, he was appointed spokesman of the Supreme Court by seniority. On 18 December 2015 he was elected President of the Supreme Court for the 2016–2018 biennium, succeeding Sergio Muñoz Gajardo. He took office on 6 January 2016. On 8 January 2018 he was succeeded by Haroldo Brito. His term as Minister of the Supreme Court ended on 29 November 2019.
