= Abraham Oyanedel =

Chief Justice of the Supreme Court of Chile (1874–1954)

Abraham Oyanedel Urrutia
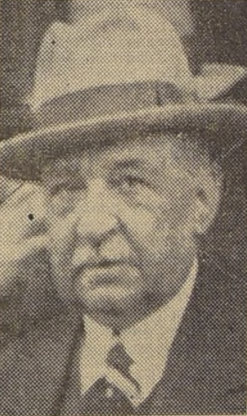

President of the Supreme Court
- In office 1932–1934
- Preceded by: Javier Figueroa
- Succeeded by: Humberto Trucco

Acting President of Chile
- In office 2 October 1932 – 24 December 1932
- Preceded by: Bartolomé Blanche
- Succeeded by: Arturo Alessandri

Personal details
- Born: 25 May 1874 Copiapó, Chile
- Died: 28 January 1954 (aged 79) Chile
- Spouse: Emma Grebe Castañó
- Education: University of Chile

Abraham Oyanedel Urrutia (25 May 1874 in Copiapó – 29 January 1954) was chief justice of the Supreme Court of Chile, who served as acting President of the provisional government of Chile in 1932. He was appointed following the resignation of Bartolomé Blanche, as an alternative to installing another military regime. Assured by Oyanedel that the provisional government would hold elections and protect foreign interests, on 21 October 1932, the United States and Great Britain extended recognition to the government of Chile for the first time since the June coup against Juan Esteban Montero.

== Early life and education ==
He studied law at the Universidad de Chile in Santiago, and in 1897 received his law degree. During the 1891 Chilean Civil War, Oyanedel fought for the Congressional army.

== Career ==
In 1927, he was appointed a member of the Supreme Court of Chile, and served as Chief Justice. On 2 October, due to the garrison revolts in Antofagasta and Concepción, Blanche resigned his power to Oyanedel. Nearly all of Oyanedel's work was to convene the general elections, which were won by Arturo Alessandri for his second term in office. Oyanedel handed over the presidential power on Christmas Day, 24 December 1932. Oyanedel had led the country for 82 days from the position of Vice President of the Republic.

Political offices
Preceded by Bartolomé Blanche	President of Chile; Acting; 1932	Succeeded by Arturo Alessandri
Legal offices
Preceded by Javier Angel Figueroa	President of the Supreme Court; 1932–1934	Succeeded by Humberto Trucco
