= Rafael Celedón =

Chilean footballer (born 1979)

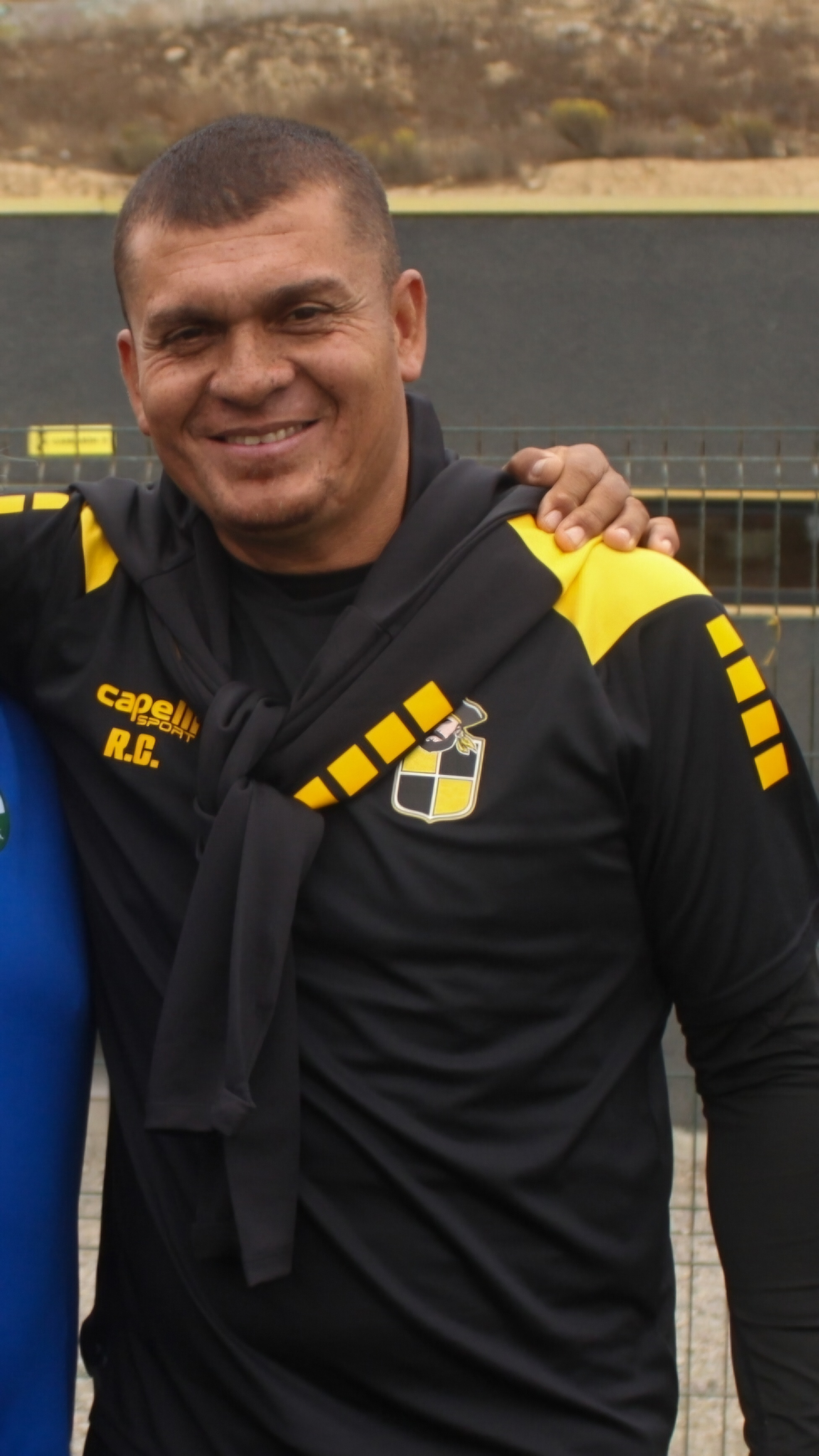

Personal information
- Full name: Rafael Andrés Celedón Salazar
- Date of birth: 10 September 1979 (age 47)
- Place of birth: Santiago, Chile
- Height: 1.76 m (5 ft 9 in)
- Position: Midfielder

Youth career
- Universidad Católica
- –1998: Cobreloa

Senior career*
Years	Team	Apps	(Gls)
1999	Deportes Melipilla		
2000	Deportes Puerto Montt		
2001–2002	Cobreloa		
2003	Coquimbo Unido		
2004	Unión San Felipe		
2005	Ñublense		
2005	Unión San Felipe		
2006	Santiago Wanderers		
2006–2007	San Luis		
2008	Cobreloa		
2009	Deportes Iquique		
2009–2012	San Marcos de Arica		

Managerial career
- 2020: Coquimbo Unido (assistant)
- 2020: Coquimbo Unido (caretaker)
- 2025–: Santiago City
- * Club domestic league appearances and goals

Rafael Andrés Celedón Salazar (born 10 September 1979) is a Chilean football manager and former footballer. He is the current manager of Chilean club Santiago City.

He played for Cobreloa.

== Personal life ==
In December 2012, he took part in friendly matches to collect money for Sueño Canario (Canary Dream), an initiative to help municipal schools in Quillota. For his team, he played alongside former footballers such as Axel Ahumada, Miguel Ángel Castillo and Franz Arancibia.

== Honours ==
=== Club ===
San Marcos de Arica

- Primera B de Chile (1): 2012
