= Franz Arancibia =

Chilean footballer (born 1967)

Personal information
- Full name: Franz Ramón Arancibia Unger
- Date of birth: 7 April 1967 (age 59)
- Place of birth: Santiago, Chile
- Height: 1.69 m (5 ft 7 in)
- Position: Forward

Youth career
- 1979–1981: Universidad Católica
- 1984: Magallanes

Senior career*
Years	Team	Apps	(Gls)
1984–1988	Magallanes		
1988	→ San Luis (loan)		
1988–1989	St. Gallen		
1989	Magallanes		
1990	Deportes La Serena	26	(2)
1991	Universidad de Chile	22	(5)
1992–1996	Deportes Temuco	129	(35)
1997	Huachipato	11	(3)
1998	Deportes Puerto Montt	25	(11)
1999	Everton		
1999	Deportes La Serena	18	(1)
2000	Deportes Antofagasta		
2001	Deportes Melipilla		

International career
1996	Chile	1	(0)
- * Club domestic league appearances and goals

Franz Ramón Arancibia Unger (born 7 April 1967) is a Chilean former professional footballer who played as a forward for clubs in Chile and Switzerland.

== Club career ==
Arancibia was with the Universidad Católica youth ranks until the age of 14, then he played for amateur clubs until he joined Magallanes at the age of 17, making his professional debut against his former club. In the 1988 season, he played on loan for San Luis de Quillota. After, He had a stint with Swiss club St. Gallen.

He also played for Deportes La Serena, Universidad de Chile, Deportes Temuco, with whom he got his better seasons, Huachipato, Deportes Puerto Montt, Everton, Deportes Antofagasta and Deportes Melipilla, where he retired at the age of 34.

In his debut with Universidad de Chile on 11 August 1991, he scored a goal against Deportes Antofagasta at 29 seconds. In the club, he made up a pair with Christian Torres in attack.

== International career ==
In 1996, Arancibia made an appearance for the Chile national team in the friendly match against Bolivia on 4 February.

== Post-retirement ==
In 2009, Arancibia took part in the fourth season of the Chilean reality show Pelotón, staying 60 days.

In the 2012 Chilean municipal election he was a candidate to councillor of Quinta Normal, but he wasn't elected.

In December 2012, he took part in friendly matches to collect money for Sueño Canario (Canary Dream), an initiative to help municipal schools in Quillota. For his team, he played alongside former footballers such as Rafael Celedón, Miguel Ángel Castillo and Axel Ahumada.

He works as coach of youth players in some football academies such as Lo Blanco Academy and Millahue School. In Lo Prado commune he has worked alongside Mauricio Araneda, a former footballer of Huachipato. For the municipality of El Bosque, he has served as a football coach.

== Personal life ==
His father, Ramón Roque Arancibia, played football at amateur level in Renca, and his mother, Edith Unger, deceased in 2016, was who involved his children in football. His maternal grandfather, Franz Kramer Unger Smuk, also played football.

Franz is the eldest of four brothers who were professional footballers: Leopoldo or Polo, Eduardo and Roque. He is also the uncle of the footballer Francisco, son of Leopoldo. Franz, Eduardo and Francisco have played for Universidad de Chile. In addition, his both nephews Martín, son of his sister Marcela, and Maximiliano, son of Eduardo, were with the Palestino youth ranks.

He is nicknamed Otto, because of his German descent from his maternal line, as well as El Hijo del Viento (The Wind's Son) due to his speed. Another footballer, Juan Carlos Muñoz, who played for Colchagua in the 1990s, was also nicknamed El Hijo del Viento, just like Franz.
