= Christian Torres =

Christian Torres or Cristian Torres may refer to:

- Christian Torres (footballer, born 1969), Chilean football forward
- Cristian Torres (footballer, born 1985), Latvian football midfielder
- Christian Torres (footballer, born 1996), Mexican football defender
- Christian Torres (footballer, born 2004), Mexican football winger
