= Gabriela Pérez Paredes =

Chilean lawyer and judge (1938–2022)

Minister of the Supreme Court of Chile
- In office 15 May 2007 – 10 January 2013
- Nominated by: Michelle Bachelet
- Preceded by: María Antonia Morales

Personal details
- Born: 1938 Rengo, Chile
- Died: 9 November 2022 (aged 84)
- Education: University of Chile
- Occupation: Judge; lawyer

Gabriela Pérez Paredes (1938 – 9 November 2022) was a Chilean lawyer and judge. She served as a Minister of the Supreme Court of Chile from 2007 to 2013.

== Education ==
She studied at Liceo N°3 de Niñas de Santiago (Girls' High School No. 3 in Santiago) and then enrolled in the Faculty of Law at the University of Chile. She qualified as a lawyer in 1964.

== Career ==
In 1966, she joined the judiciary as a clerk at the Rengo Magistrates' Court, eventually becoming a judge at the same court. She joined the Rancagua Court of Appeal as a substitute rapporteur in 1969. She served as a judge of the San Vicente de Tagua Tagua Court of First Instance from 1972 and as a presiding judge of the Rengo Court of First Instance from August 1974.

In 1976, she was appointed deputy rapporteur of the Santiago Court of Appeal, and in August 1977, she was appointed to the position. From 1982, she served as interim rapporteur for the Supreme Court of Chile and assumed the position as a permanent member in 1985. Four years later, on 6 July 1989, she left the position to serve as a minister of the Santiago Court of Appeals. She was president of that court in 2006.

In 2007, she was nominated by President Michelle Bachelet as a Supreme Court Justice to fill the vacancy left by Justice María Antonia Morales, a position she assumed on 15 May of that year. She stepped down as a Justice in January 2013, upon reaching the age of 75, the retirement age for the Judiciary.

== Death ==
Pérez died on 9 November 2022, at the age of 84.
