= Axel Ahumada =

Chilean footballer (born 1977)

Personal information
- Full name: Axel Fernando Ahumada Flores
- Date of birth: 4 May 1977 (age 49)
- Place of birth: Quillota, Chile
- Height: 1.81 m (5 ft 11 in)
- Position: Forward

Youth career
- San Luis
- Colo-Colo

Senior career*
| Years | Team | Apps | (Gls) |
| 1992–1998 | San Luis | – | (–) |
| 1997 | → Universidad de Concepción (loan) | – | (–) |
| 1998–2002 | Coquimbo Unido | 63 | (19) |
| 2000 | → Deportes La Serena (loan) | | (11) |
| 2003 | CSA | – | (–) |
| 2003 | Everton | 30 | (7) |
| 2004 | Cobresal | 10 | (5) |
| 2004 | Deportes Arica | | |
| 2005 | Rangers | 8 | (0) |
| 2006 | Deportivo Italmaracaibo | 6 | (0) |

International career
| 2001 | Chile | 2 | (0) |
- * Club domestic league appearances and goals

Axel Fernando Ahumada Flores (born 4 May 1977) is a Chilean former professional footballer who played as a forward for clubs in Chile and Venezuela.

== Club career ==
Born in Quillota, Chile, Ahumada was trained at local club San Luis de Quillota and joined the first team at the age of 15 in the Tercera División.

A well-known former player of Coquimbo Unido, Ahumada also played for Colo-Colo (youth), Universidad de Concepción, San Luis de Quillota, Deportes La Serena, Everton de Viña del Mar, Cobresal, Deportes Arica and Rangers de Talca. Along with Everton, he got promotion to the Primera División after winning the 2003 Primera B. In 2003, he also had a brief stint with Brazilian side Centro Sportivo Alagoano alongside his fellow footballer Carlos Gajardo.

His last club was Deportivo Italmaracaibo in the 2005–06 Venezuelan Primera División.

== International career ==
In 2001, Ahumada made two appearances for the Chile national team in the 2002 FIFA World Cup qualifiers against Bolivia and Ecuador. He joined the squad after Marcelo Corrales was injured.

== Personal life ==
While he was a player of Rangers de Talca, it was reported that he had committed violent acts against his family, so he was fired from the club.

In December 2012, he took part in friendly matches to collect money for Sueño Canario (Canary Dream), an initiative to help municipal schools in Quillota. For his team, he played alongside former footballers such as Rafael Celedón, Miguel Ángel Castillo and Franz Arancibia.

== Honours ==
Everton

- Primera B de Chile: 2003
