= Juan Carlos Muñoz (footballer, born 1968) =

Chilean footballer

Personal information
- Full name: Juan Carlos Muñoz Navarro
- Date of birth: 4 April 1968 (age 58)
- Place of birth: Peralillo, Chile
- Position: Winger

Youth career
- Unión Santa Cruz

Senior career*
Years	Team	Apps	(Gls)
1986–1988	Unión Santa Cruz		
1989	Juventud Ferro		
1990	Unión Veterana		
1991–1995	Colchagua		
1996	Everton	15	(2)
1997	Rangers	8	(0)
1997–2001	Deportes La Serena	53	(9)
1998	→ Croatia Zagreb (loan)	2	(1)
- * Club domestic league appearances and goals

Juan Carlos Muñoz Navarro (born 4 April 1968) is a Chilean former professional footballer who played as a winger.

== Career ==
Born in Peralillo, specifically in the Puquillay area, he began his career with Unión Santa Cruz in the Chilean Segunda División at the end of the 1980s. After having few chances to play, he played for Juventud Ferro from Chimbarongo and Unión Veterana from Peumo in the Tercera División.

In 1991 he moved to Colchagua along with his brother Osvaldo, who played as a defender. With Colchagua, they almost got promotion to the Primera División in the 1994 Segunda División de Chile. The Muñoz brothers also played for Everton in 1996, and Rangers in 1997, winning the 1997 Apertura of the Primera B.

In second half 1997, he moved to the Chilean Primera División side Deportes La Serena, making 15 appearances and scoring 3 goals in his first stint. With Deportes La Serena, he played in the 1998 Copa Ciudad de La Serena, a friendly international tournament in January, which competed Croatia Zagreb and Hajduk Split from Croatia, Ferencváros from Hungary, Legia Warsaw from Poland and Colo-Colo. At the end of the match between Deportes La Serena and Croatia Zagreb, where Muñoz scored a goal, he took a picture alongside Robert Prosinečki, who recommended his signing for Croatia Zagreb, becoming the first Chilean in the Croatian football, aged 29.

For Croatia Zagreb, he made his debut scoring a goal against Hajduk Split and won both the 1997–98 Croatian First Football League and the 1997–98 Croatian Football Cup, but after his daughter became seriously ill, he returned to Deportes La Serena, where he retired in 2001.

As curiosities, the President of Everton in 1996, Jorge "Loco" Castillo, confused the Muñoz brothers with truck driver's mates and requested them to move some chairs. In addition, when he joined Deportes La Serena, Raúl Aredes mistook him for a club fan looking for an autograph.

== Personal life ==
His brother, Osvaldo, is a former football defender with whom he coincided in Colchagua, Everton and Rangers.

As a player of Colchagua, he was nicknamed El Hijo del Viento (The Wind's Son) due to his speed, as the footballer Franz Arancibia.

After his retirement, he worked in the mining industry, and for Nestlé Chile.

He was honored as an important person from Peralillo by the municipality of the town.

== Honours ==
Rangers

- Primera B: 1997 Apertura

Croatia Zagreb

- Croatian First Football League: 1997–98
- Croatian Football Cup: 1997–98
