= Juan José Albornoz =

Chilean footballer (born 1982)

Personal information
- Full name: Juan José Albornoz Figueroa
- Date of birth: 12 February 1982 (age 44)
- Place of birth: Talca, Chile
- Height: 1.73 m (5 ft 8 in)
- Position: Midfielder

Youth career
- Universidad de Chile
- Rangers

Senior career*
Years	Team	Apps	(Gls)
1997–2004	Rangers	44	(1)
2002	→ Lota Schwager (loan)	0	(0)
2005	Universidad de Concepción	12	(0)
2006	Unión San Felipe		
2007	Provincial Osorno	30	(2)
2008–2009	Curicó Unido	66	(11)
2010–2011	Palestino	50	(2)
2012–2013	Curicó Unido	42	(5)
2013–2014	Deportes Copiapó	30	(1)
2014–2017	Rangers	65	(3)
Total		339+	(25+)

International career
2001	Chile U20	2	(0)
2004	Chile U23	3	(0)
- * Club domestic league appearances and goals

Juan José Albornoz Figueroa (born 12 February 1982) is a Chilean former footballer who played as a midfielder.

== Career ==
As a youth player, Albornoz was with Universidad de Chile, coinciding with the former Chile international goalkeeper Johnny Herrera.

== Personal life ==
Albornoz was a candidate to councillor for Talca commune in the 2024 Chilean regional elections.

== Honours ==
Rangers

- Primera B (1): 1997 Apertura

Provincial Osorno

- Primera B (1): 2007

Curicó Unido

- Primera B (1): 2008
