= Law of Chile =

The legal system of Chile belongs to the Continental Law tradition. The basis for its public law is the 1980 Constitution, reformed in 1989 and 2005. According to it, Chile is a democratic republic. There is a clear separation of functions between the President of the Republic, the Congress, the judiciary, and the Constitutional Court. See Politics of Chile. On the other hand, private relationships are governed, mainly, by the Chilean Civil Code, most of which has not been amended in 150 years. Several laws outside the code govern most of business law.

== Public law ==
=== Constitution ===
The current Political Constitution of the Republic of Chile, approved by Chilean voters in a tightly controlled plebiscite on September 11, 1980, under Augusto Pinochet, and made effective on March 11, 1981, has been amended in 1989, 1991, 1994, 1997, 1999, 2000, 2001, 2003, and 2005.

In 2005, over 50 reforms were approved, which eliminated some of the remaining undemocratic provisions of the text, such as the existence of unelected Senators (appointed senators or senators for life) and the inability of the President to remove the Commander in Chief of the Armed Forces. These reforms led the President to declare Chile's transition to democracy complete controversially.

There is a constitutional court (Tribunal Constitucional) with the competence to declare a singular law "not applicable" to an individual case (inaplicabilidad por inconstitucionalidad) and, having declared that at least once, the unconstitutionality of that law in general.

=== Administrative law ===
The President of the Republic must fulfill the administrative function, in collaboration with several ministries or other authorities with ministerial rank. Each Ministry has one or more sub-secretaries. The actual satisfaction of public needs is performed through public services, dependent or at least related to one of those sub-secretaries.

All Ministries and public services have a body of workers or administrative personnel (funcionarios públicos).

Public property is subject to privileges and burdens, because it serves public purposes. The sea, rivers, and lakes, mines, and natural reservations belong to the state and may be used by "anyone", but when individual exploitation is possible, then it is in the hands of the private sector. On the other hand, buildings, cars, and other supplies that are necessary for the work of public agencies are also property of the state.

Public entities act through administrative procedures, that is, processes with formal stages in which opportunities to present evidence and to exercise appeals are granted to citizens. The recent basic law on administrative procedures addresses most general matters about the administrative procedures of all public entities.

There is no single administrative court to handle actions against administrative entities; rather, there are several specialized courts and review procedures. However, civil courts have jurisdiction over all matters not within the scope of other tribunals, such as public liability and the overturning of single administrative acts.

=== Regulation ===
Since the privatization of most economic activities in the 1980s, the President and the independent agencies have become the main policymakers regarding the regulation of the economy, subordinated to legislation.

The exploitation of mines and water resources is granted to private entrepreneurs under concession.

All activities that can have a significant impact on the environment must obtain an administrative authorization and are subject to local regulation by the corresponding agencies.

There are agencies (Superintendencias) dealing with:

- Electricity and Fuels (Superintendencia de Electricidad y Combustibles, SEC),
- Water Supply and Treatment (Superintendencia de Servicios Sanitarios, SISS),
- Banking and Finance, Stock Exchange and Insurances (Comisión para el Mercado Financiero, CMF)

CMF was created by merging of former agencies: Superintendencia de Bancos e Instituciones Financieras, SBIF and Superintendencia de Valores y Seguros, SVS.

- Casinos (Superintendencia de Casinos de Juegos, SCJ)
- Bankruptcy (Superintendencia de Insolvencia y Reemprendimiento, SIR),
- Environmental Protection (Superintendencia de Medio Ambiente, SMA),
- Pensions and Retirement Funds (Superintendencia de Pensiones, SP),
- Social Security (Superintendencia de Seguridad Social, SUSESO),
- Health (Superintendencia de Salud),
- Education (Superintendenica de Educación), etc.

== Private law ==
=== Civil Code ===
The Civil Code of the Republic of Chile is the work of the Chilean-Venezuelan jurist and legislator Andrés Bello. After several years of individual work (though officially presented as the work of multiple Congressional commissions), Congress passed the Civil Code into law on December 14, 1855, and it came into force on January 1, 1857. The code has remained in force since then, though it has undergone numerous amendments.

The main modernizations the code has undergone have affected family law and the law of successions. On the one hand, these reforms have introduced more equal relations between men and women. On the other hand, they have eliminated discrimination between children born from married couples and those born extramaritally.

Being part of the civil law tradition, there is no obedience to precedent in Chilean law. Nevertheless, judgments of a higher court can be appealed to the Supreme Court based on the erroneous application of the law, thus being able to deliver uniform decisions in controversial matters of law. See Judiciary of Chile.

=== Commerce ===
Though the Commerce Code of 1868 was the primary source of business law, legislation is now widely distributed among many legislative bodies.

For instance, both the Civil Code and the Commerce Code address basic matters of enterprises, but corporations and limited liability enterprises have their own statutes.

Recently, the law of bankruptcy has been incorporated into the Commerce Code as part of a process of re-codification.

Matters such as banking and the stock exchange are strongly regulated by government agencies and therefore are subject to public scrutiny. Recently, these agencies have fined important executives for insider trading.

=== Family ===
Originally, Family law in Chile was shaped by the conservative spirit of 19th-century society. Their principles were: high protection of the matrimonial family (and discrimination in non-matrimonial filiation), authority of the husband over the wife, and great parental power over the children. Also, in the beginning, the Catholic Church had control over many aspects of family life. Still, with the Laicist Acts (Leyes Laicas), their powers were transferred to state agencies, like the Civil Registration, and the Civil Marriage was created in 1884.

However, there were several reforms throughout the 20th century aimed at ending legal discrimination, promoting more equal family relationships, and protecting the most vulnerable members. Therefore, in 1967, the Childs Act (Ley de Menores), in 1993, the Domestic Violence Act (Ley de Violencia Intrafamiliar), and in 2004, a new Civil Marriage Law (Ley de Matrimonio Civil) that introduces divorce. Likewise, the Civil Code was reformed many times to improve conditions for married women, and in 1989, the husband's authority was repealed; in 1998, a new filiative system was introduced that gives equal rights to children born within or outside of marriage.

In recent years, new reforms have allowed same-sex couples to obtain many rights. Thus, in 2014 is created the Civil Union Agreement (Acuerdo de Unión Civil), and in 2021 is established the same-sex marriage.

Since 2005, a separate family procedure has been established by the Family Courts (Juzgados de Familia) with a verbal trial.

== Criminal law ==
Since 2000, Chilean criminal procedure has undergone one of the most significant legal reforms in the country's history, completely replacing an inquisitorial procedure with an accusatorial system, very similar to that of Germany or the United States. While the prosecution is in charge of an autonomous authority (Ministerio Público), the actual judgment is made by a collegiate court (Tribunal de Juicio Oral en lo Penal). Trials are public and verbal. However, the law provides several alternatives to the defendant to avoid trial while also ensuring the victim's satisfaction and public safety.

The Chilean Criminal Code, which defines the conduct that constitutes an offense and the applicable conviction, dates back to 1874. It was greatly inspired by the Spanish Code of 1848 and the Belgian Code of 1867. The code has been widely criticized, and the Ministry of Justice is studying a complete replacement by the year 2010.

== See also ==
- History of Chile
- Economy of Chile
