= Enrique Cood =

Chilean politician and diplomat

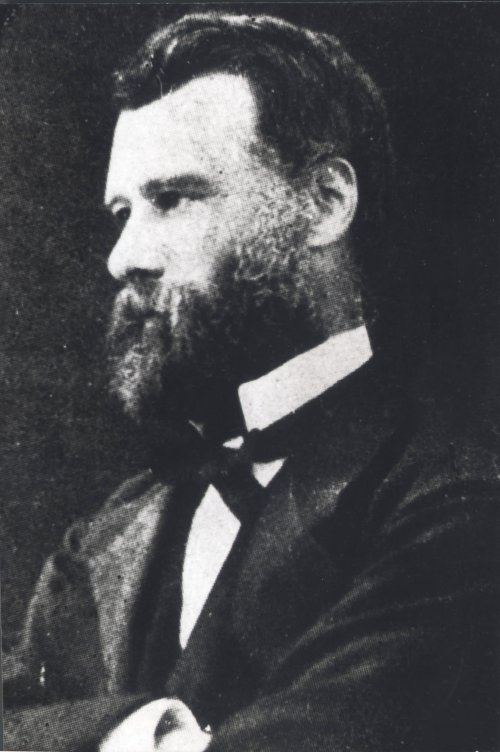
Enrique Cood

Enrique Cood Ross (1826 – February 27, 1888) was a Chilean political figure, who served as minister and diplomat.

He was born in Valparaíso, the son of Enrique Cood and of Isabel Ross. After completing his studies in his native city at the school of Guillermo Wolkins, he continued his education in England and Belgium. Cood returned to Chile in 1851 and graduated as a lawyer from the Universidad de Chile on January 20, 1857, where he also taught Civil Law. He became a member of the school of Humanities of the same university in 1857 and of the School of Law and Political Science in 1862. Cood married María Ugarte Ramírez on April 3, 1857, and after her death he married Enriqueta Lecaros Alcalde.

Cood started his political career in 1864 when he was elected as a deputy for "Laja" (1864-1867, being reelected for "Chillán" (1867-1870), "Melipilla" (1870-1873); "Vichuquén" (1873-1876), and "Melipilla" (1876-1879). He also worked as a private lawyer. In 1875 President Federico Errázuriz Zañartu named him junior Minister of Foreign Affairs and promoted him to the senior position at the ministry on April 5, 1875.

After the War of the Pacific, he worked as plenipotentiary agent to the joint tribunal charged with resolving the claims of Italian citizens who suffered losses due to damages incurred by military actions.

He died in his home in Santiago, at the age of 62.

Political offices
Preceded by Adolfo Ibáñez	Minister of Foreign Affairs and Colonization; 1875-1876	Succeeded by José Alfonso Cavada
