= María Antonia Morales =

Chilean judge (1931–2024)

Minister of the Supreme Court of Chile
- In office 5 November 2001 – 1 September 2006
- Nominated by: Ricardo Lagos
- Preceded by: Osvaldo Faúndez Vallejos
- Succeeded by: Gabriela Pérez Paredes

Personal details
- Born: 1 September 1931 Cañete, Chile
- Died: 25 December 2024 (aged 93)
- Party: Independent
- Education: University of Chile
- Occupation: Judge, lawyer

María Antonia Morales (1 September 1931 – 25 December 2024) was a Chilean judge. An independent, she served as the first female minister of the Supreme Court of Chile from 2001 to 2006.

Morales died on 25 December 2024, at the age of 93. Her funeral was held on 26 December at the Metropolitan Cemetery in the municipality of Lo Espejo.
