= MOP-Gate case =

In 2003 judge Gloria Ana Chevesich initiated a probe of corruption at the Ministry of Public Works (MOP) – a case known as MOP-Gate Case: contractors got from the MOP 1,250 million Chilean Peso (approximately 415,000 USD) for non-executed or overpriced works. The money was deviated to Gate ("Gestion Territorial y Ambiental"), a consulting firm that distributed to 129 clerks of the MOP as "extra money". 22 individuals from both the public and private sectors were variously charged with the crimes of defrauding the State, fraud and residual fraud. Five defendants were convicted.

The case was headline news for years, with Chevesich supporters applauding her efforts to root out corruption in the government under the administration of the Concertación coalition, and detractors dismissing the case as a political witch hunt.

== Consequences ==
After 7 years of investigation, the head of the ministry, Carlos Cruz, was sentenced to 3 years, and to pay damages for 800,000,000 CLP (1.6M USD) to the Chilean State. The director of Concessions, Sergio Cortés to 3 years, Eduardo Balbontín, ex-director of Water works, Gonzalo Castillo, chief of department in ministry, (both to 61 days), Nazir Sapag, ex director del CIADE of the Universidad de Chile (200 days), Óscar Peña Véliz, owner of Gate consulting (61 days) and Oscar Araos (541 days). All jail sentences were suspended sentence.

2004 was set up Alta Dirección Pública (ADP), a major step forward to create a professional, merit-based civil service. ADP is the result of a political consensus achieved in the wake of the 2002 MOP-Gate scandal in the Public Works and Transport Ministry. The “New Deal” law passed in 2003 during the government of Ricardo Lagos aims both to reduce the number of political appointees in the public administration and to improve its efficiency and transparency.

== See also ==
- Kodama Case
