= Gloria Ana Chevesich =

Chilean lawyer and judge

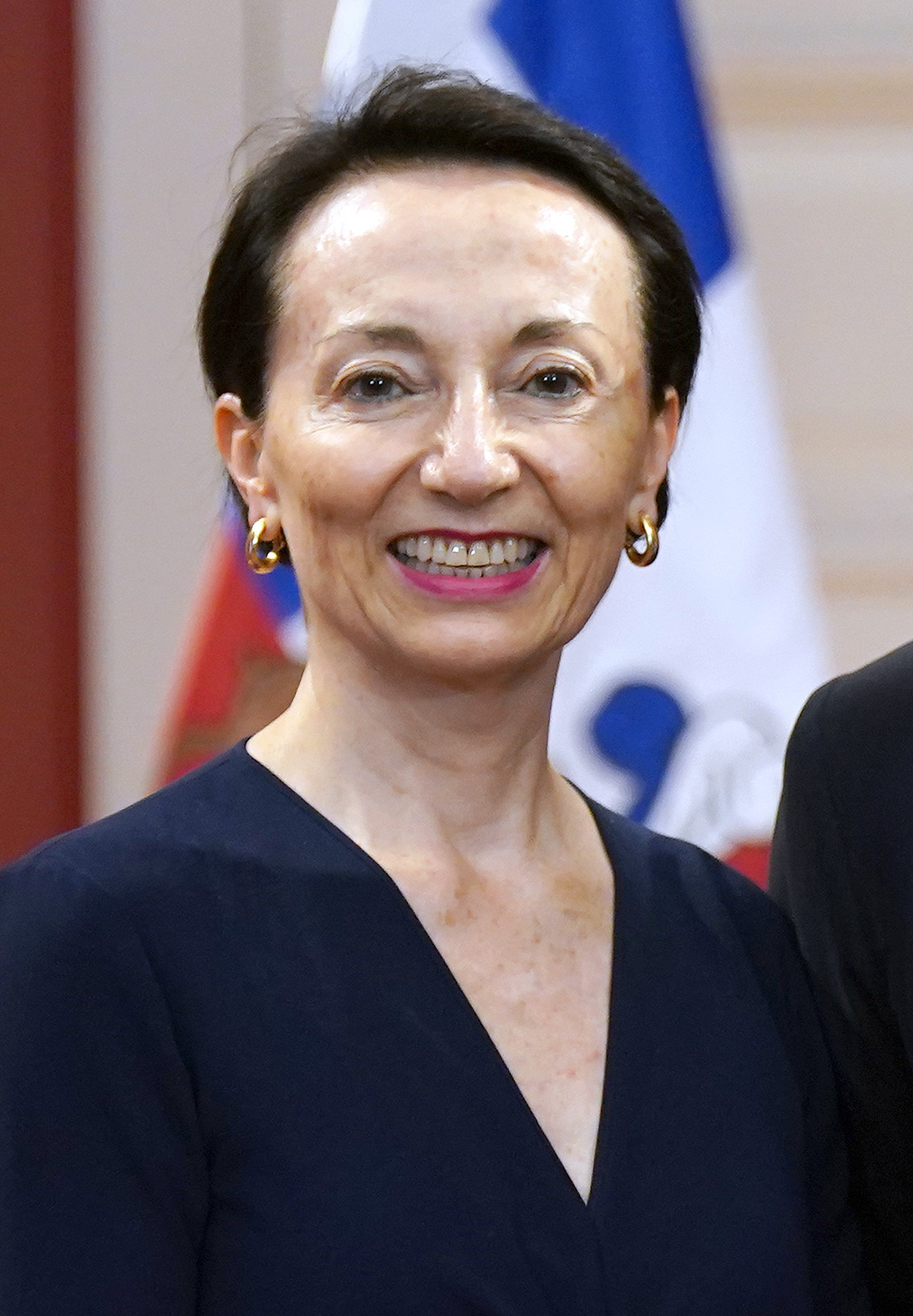
- Chevesich in 2026

President of the Supreme Court of Chile
- Incumbent
- Assumed office 6 January 2026
- President: Gabriel Boric; José Antonio Kast
- Preceded by: Ricardo Blanco Herrera

Minister of the Supreme Court of Chile
- Incumbent
- Assumed office 3 August 2013

President of the Court of Appeals of Santiago
- In office January 2013 – 3 August 2013

Minister of the Court of Appeals of Santiago
- In office October 2002 – 3 August 2013

Personal details
- Born: Gloria Ana Chevesich Ruiz; 4 November 1958 (age 67)
- Spouse: Andrés de la Maza Camus (m. 1979; died 2004)
- Children: 2
- Education: University of Chile
- Occupation: Lawyer, judge
- Known for: MOP-Gate case

Gloria Ana Chevesich Ruiz (born 4 November 1958) is a Chilean lawyer and judge. She is currently a minister of the Supreme Court of Chile, and previously served as president and minister of the Court of Appeals of Santiago. On 6 January 2026 she became the first female president of the Supreme Court of Chile.

== Career ==
Gloria Ana Chevesich graduated from the Law School of the University of Chile. She entered the judiciary in June 1986, when she became rapporteur of the Court of Appeals of Santiago, a position she held until 1994. In March 1995, she was appointed rapporteur of the plenary of the Supreme Court. In that role, she participated in the process of lifting the parliamentary immunity of Augusto Pinochet, and was responsible for drafting the court's ruling.

In October 2002, she was appointed minister of the Court of Appeals of Santiago. There she became known for assuming, on behalf of the Supreme Court, the investigation of the corruption case known as "MOP-Gate". This took over seven years to complete and resulted in the conviction of fourteen defendants, including former Public Works minister Carlos Cruz Lorenzen, who was sentenced to three years in prison and a fine of 799 million pesos (1.2 million US dollars).

Chevesich became president of the Court of Santiago for the judicial year 2013, succeeding Minister Iván Villarroel.

At the end of May 2013, President Sebastián Piñera nominated her to join the Supreme Court, a decision that was ratified by the Senate on 3 July. On 3 August 2013, she was sworn in as a new minister of the Supreme Court, becoming the fourth woman to do so, leaving the presidency of the Court of Appeals of Santiago in the hands of Minister Juan Escobar Zepeda.

== Personal life ==
While studying at the university, Gloria Ana Chevesich met Andrés de la Maza Camus, with whom she had a relationship for two years, until they married in 1979. The couple had two daughters. Her husband died in July 2004.
