= Adolfo Ibáñez =

Chilean politician (1827–1898)

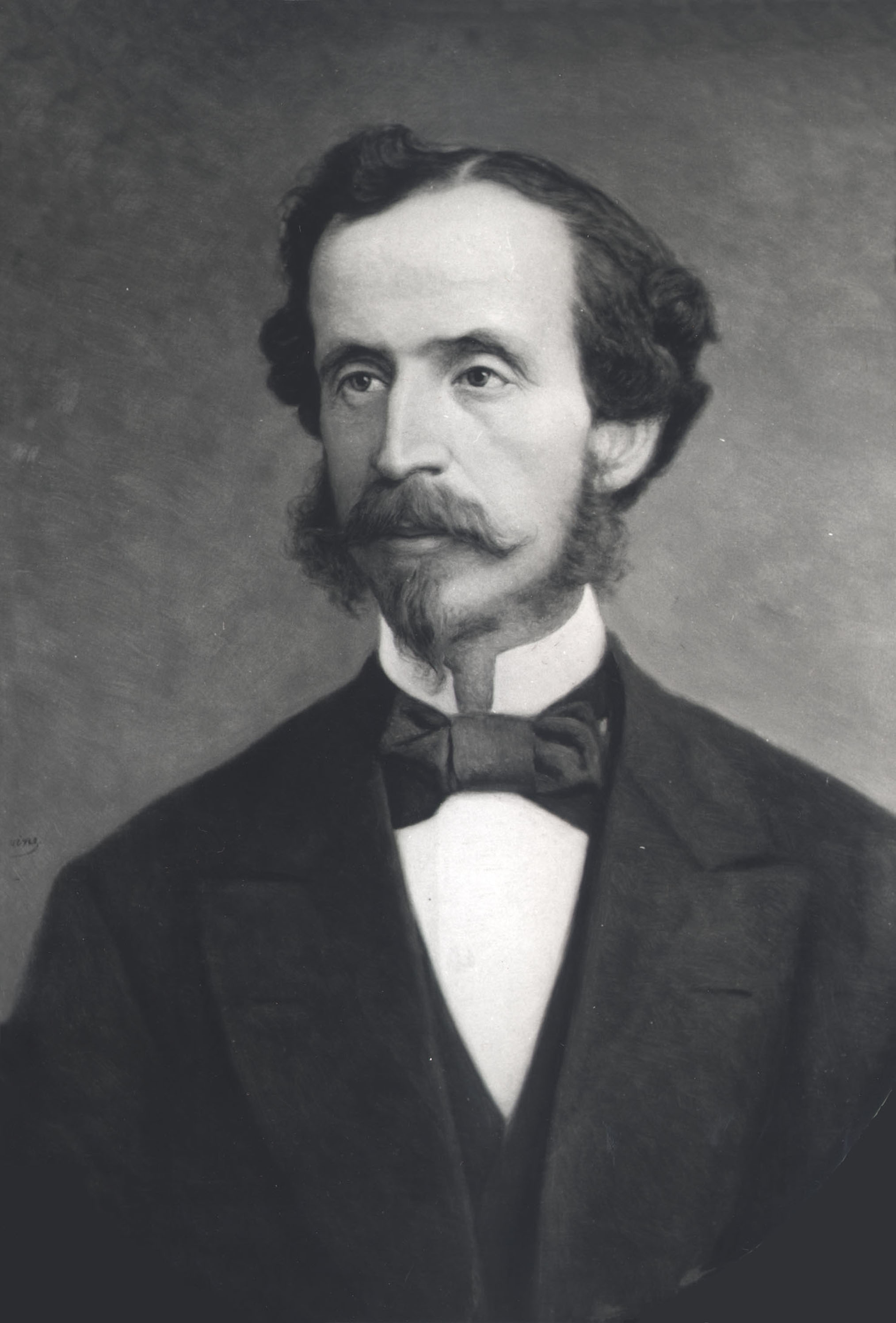

Minister of Foreign Affairs
- In office 23 December 1871 – 3 April 1875
- President: Federico Errázuriz Z.
- Preceded by: Eulogio Altamirano
- Succeeded by: Enrique Cood

Minister of the Interior
- In office 21 January 1890 – 30 May 1890
- President: José Manuel Balmaceda
- Preceded by: Mariano Sánchez Fontecilla
- Succeeded by: Salvador Sanfuentes

Minister of Justice and Public Instruction
- In office 18 September 1896 – 20 November 1896
- President: Federico Errázuriz E.
- Preceded by: Gaspar Toro
- Succeeded by: Federico Puga

Member of the Senate of Chile
- In office 1882–1888
- Constituency: Santiago
- In office 1876–1882
- Constituency: Valdivia

Personal details
- Born: 28 November 1827 Santiago, Chile
- Died: 12 August 1898 (aged 70) Santiago, Chile
- Party: Liberal Party
- Spouse: Josefina Rondizzoni
- Parent(s): Gregorio Ibáñez Salces; Mercedes Gutiérrez de Miers
- Education: University of Chile (LL.B)
- Profession: Lawyer

Adolfo Ibáñez Gutiérrez (28 November 1827 – 12 August 1898) was a Chilean lawyer and politician who served two terms as a member of the Senate of Chile and held several cabinet positions, including Minister of Foreign Affairs under President Federico Errázuriz Zañartu.

He also served as Chilean diplomatic representative to Peru and the United States and participated in negotiations concerning Chile's boundary disputes with Argentina and Bolivia.

== Early life ==
Ibáñez was born in Santiago on 28 November 1827 to Gregorio Ibáñez Salces and Mercedes Gutiérrez de Miers. He married Josefina Rondizzoni de la Cotera, with whom he had nine children.

He attended the Colegio de Santiago and subsequently studied law at the Instituto Nacional and the University of Chile. He qualified as a lawyer on 9 January 1852.

Ibáñez entered public service in 1853 as secretary of the La Serena Court of Appeals. He later served as a judge in Chiloé and Valparaíso and, in 1875, became prosecutor of the Santiago Court of Appeals.

== Political career ==
A member of the Liberal Party, Ibáñez began his diplomatic career as chargé d'affaires in Peru in 1870 and was subsequently appointed envoy extraordinary and minister plenipotentiary there. Under President Federico Errázuriz Zañartu, he served as Minister of Foreign Affairs from 1871 to 1875. In 1875, he was appointed envoy extraordinary and minister plenipotentiary to the United States.

Ibáñez was elected senator for Valdivia for the 1876–1882 legislative term and subsequently represented Santiago from 1882 to 1888. He served as vice president of the Senate and participated in the commission responsible for drafting the Penal Code.

Under President José Manuel Balmaceda, Ibáñez served as Minister of the Interior from January to May 1890 and later as a councillor of state. He was elected senator for Santiago to the Constituent Congress of 1891. Following Balmaceda's defeat in the 1891 Chilean Civil War, Ibáñez went into exile in Buenos Aires, where he remained for four years.

After returning to Chile, Ibáñez briefly served as Minister of Justice and Public Instruction under President Federico Errázuriz Echaurren, from 18 September to 20 November 1896.

Ibáñez died in Santiago on 12 August 1898, aged 70.
