= Sergio Muñoz Gajardo =

Chilean judge

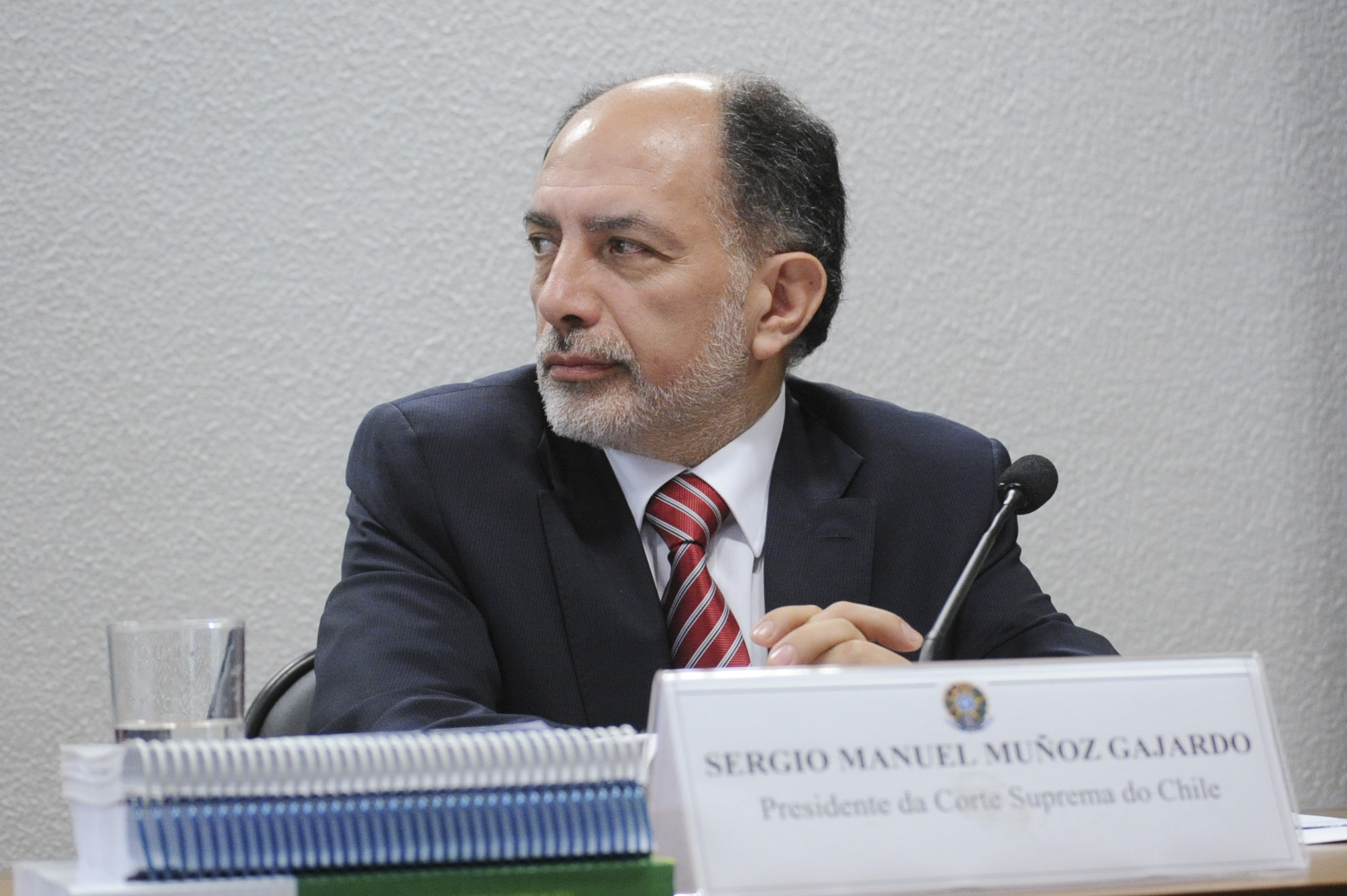

President of the Supreme Court of Chile
- In office 6 January 2014 – 6 January 2016
- President: Sebastián Piñera; Michelle Bachelet
- Preceded by: Rubén Ballesteros
- Succeeded by: Hugo Dolmestch

Minister of the Supreme Court of Chile
- Incumbent
- Assumed office 18 October 2005
- Appointed by: Ricardo Lagos

Personal details
- Born: 10 February 1957 (age 69) Linares, Chile
- Education: Pontifical Catholic University of Valparaíso (LL.B)
- Profession: Lawyer

Sergio Muñoz Gajardo (born 10 February 1957) is a Chilean lawyer who has served as president of the Supreme Court of Chile.
