= Humberto Trucco =

Chilean judge

Humberto Trucco Franzani was a Chilean judge who served as President of Supreme Court of Chile from 1934 to 1937.
