= Atala Riffo and Daughters v. Chile =

Inter-American Court of Human Rights sentence

- Court: Inter-American Court of Human Rights
- Full case name: Atala Riffo and Daughters v. Chile
- Decided: February 24, 2012
- Citations: Inter-Am. Comm. HR, Case 12.502

Court membership
- Judges sitting: Diego García Sayán, President; Manuel E. Ventura Robles, Vice-President; Leonardo A. Franco, Margarette May Macaulay, Rhadys Abreu-Blondet, Alberto Pérez Pérez, Judges

Case opinions
- Laws which discriminate on the basis of sexual orientation are prohibited by the American Convention on Human Rights; sexual orientation is a suspect classification.

Keywords
- sexual orientation; child custody; equal protection; LGBT rights

Atala Riffo and Daughters v. Chile (Spanish: Atala Riffo y Niñas vs. Chile) was a landmark Inter-American Court of Human Rights case on LGBT rights, which reviewed a Chilean court ruling that in 2005 awarded child custody to a father due to the mother's homosexual orientation.

It was the first case the Inter-American Court took regarding LGBT rights. The Court's ruling also determined sexual orientation to be a suspect classification.

== Child custody ==
Karen Atala Riffo is a Chilean judge and lesbian mother of three daughters. Atala was separated from her husband in 2001, and originally reached a settlement with her ex-husband that she would retain custody of the children. When Atala came out as a lesbian in 2002, however, the ex-husband sued for custody, where the case was eventually heard by the Supreme Court of Chile. That court awarded the husband custody, saying that Atala's relationship put the development of her children at risk.

== IACHR appeal ==
In late 2004, Atala took the case to the Inter-American Commission on Human Rights, supported by amicus briefs from a number of rights organizations including the National Center for Lesbian Rights. In 2008, the Commission ruled that the case was admissible to the Court, as it concerned Article 24 of the American Convention on Human Rights concerning equal protection. This marked the first time the IACHR had taken an LGBT rights case.

In 2010, the Court ruled that sexual orientation was a suspect class, and that in Atala had been discriminated against in the custody case in ways incompatible with the American Convention. In 2012, the court further awarded custody and damages of USD $50,000 damages and $12,000 in court costs. Chile's Minister of Justice, Teodoro Ribera said that Chile would abide by the ruling.

== As precedent ==
In December 2012, Mexico's highest judicial body, the Supreme Court of Justice of the Nation, unanimously struck down an Oaxaca law which prohibited same-sex marriage, with a decision based in part in the Atala ruling's prohibition of "any rule, act, or discriminatory practice based on sexual orientation".
