= Christian Torres (footballer, born 1969) =

Chilean footballer

Personal information
- Full name: Christian Carlos Torres Hidalgo
- Date of birth: 5 September 1969 (age 57)
- Place of birth: Llanquihue, Chile
- Height: 1.82 m (6 ft 0 in)
- Position: Forward

Youth career
- Deportes Puerto Montt

Senior career*
Years	Team	Apps	(Gls)
1989–1991	Deportes Puerto Montt		(9)
1991	Universidad de Chile	4	(0)
1992–1993	Deportes La Serena	30	(1)
1993	Millonarios		(1)
1994	Cúcuta Deportivo		
1995	O'Higgins	19	(0)
1996–1997	León	44	(17)
1998	América	37	(10)
1999	Monterrey	14	(7)
2000	León	10	(1)
2001	Guaraní		
2001	Deportes Puerto Montt	0	(0)
- * Club domestic league appearances and goals

Christian Carlos Torres Hidalgo (born 5 September 1969) is a Chilean former professional footballer who played as a forward for clubs in Chile, Colombia, Mexico and Paraguay.

== Career ==
A product of the Deportes Puerto Montt youth system, he made appearances for the club in the Segunda División until 1991. Then, he moved to Universidad de Chile in 1991, where he played alongside Franz Arancibia. In his homeland, he also played for Deportes La Serena and O'Higgins.

From 1993 to 1994 he played in Colombia for both Millonarios, where he scored one goal, and Cúcuta Deportivo in the top level.

From 1996 to 2000 he played in Mexico for León, América and C.F. Monterrey. In América, he coincided with players such as Leonardo Rodríguez, Rodrigo Valenzuela and Cuauhtémoc Blanco. As a member of Monterrey, he made appearances in the 1999 Copa Libertadores.

In 2001 he played for Paraguayan club Guaraní.

His last club was Deportes Puerto Montt in 2001, where he coincided with well-known players such as Esteban Valencia, José Luis Sánchez and Nelson Tapia.

== Personal life ==
He is nicknamed Kitita since he was a child, as his grandmother called him.

His father was a musician and his mother died when he was 9 years old.

After his retirement, he emigrated to Mexico and has developed a career in sport management, working mainly with children.
