= 1997 Torneo Apertura (Primera B de Chile) =

Primera B de Chile
- Season: 1997
- Champions: Everton
- Promoted: Everton
- Top goalscorer: Ramón Castillo (13)

The 1997 Torneo Clausura was part of the 46th completed season of the Primera B de Chile.

Everton was tournament’s champion after beating Rangers in the tie-breaker final.

== League table ==
Pos	Team	Pld	W	D	L	GF	GA	GD	Pts
1	Everton	15	12	2	1	34	12	+22	38
2	Rangers	15	12	2	1	31	11	+20	38
3	Deportes Iquique	15	11	1	3	35	15	+20	34
4	O'Higgins	15	8	2	5	21	21	0	26
5	Fernández Vial	15	6	6	3	24	19	+5	24
6	Cobresal	15	6	5	4	30	23	+7	23
7	Santiago Morning	15	6	4	5	27	25	+2	22
8	Deportes Arica	15	6	4	5	24	23	+1	22
9	Deportes Linares	15	5	4	6	20	21	−1	19
10	Deportes Melipilla	15	5	3	7	16	21	−5	18
11	Regional Atacama	15	4	2	9	18	33	−15	14
12	Unión San Felipe	15	3	3	9	16	32	−16	12
13	Magallanes	15	3	2	10	23	33	−10	11
14	Ñublense	15	2	5	8	23	38	−15	11
15	Unión Santa Cruz	15	1	7	7	12	20	−8	10
16	Deportes Ovalle	15	1	7	7	7	15	−8	10
