= Carlos Gajardo =

Chilean footballer

Personal information
- Full name: Carlos Alberto Gajardo Zúñiga
- Date of birth: May 20, 1976 (age 50)
- Place of birth: Tocopilla, Chile
- Positions: Midfielder; right-back

Youth career
- Escuela Codelco
- Tocopilla (city team)
- 1994–1996: Cobreloa

Senior career*
Years	Team	Apps	(Gls)
1996–1997	Cobreloa		
1996	→ Deportes Antofagasta (loan)		
1997	→ Deportes Ovalle (loan)		
2000	Arauco Tocopilla		
2001–2002	Coquimbo Unido	48	(1)
2003	CSA		
- * Club domestic league appearances and goals

Carlos Alberto Gajardo Zúñiga (born 20 May 1976) is a Chilean former footballer who played as a defensive midfielder for clubs in Chile and Brazil.

== Career ==
Born in Tocopilla, Chile, Gajardo was with Escuela de Deportes Codelco and took part of Tocopilla city team as a youth player, before joining Cobreloa youth system in 1994. Next he had stints on loan at Deportes Antofagasta, where he played as a right-back, and Deportes Ovalle in 1996 and 1997, respectively.

He left the football activity for two years (1998–99) due to a knee injury. After playing for Club Deportivo Arauco from Tocopilla in 2000, he spent two seasons with Coquimbo Unido in the Chilean top division, making forty eight appearances and scoring one goal.

In 2003, he moved to Brazil alongside his fellow footballer Axel Ahumada and joined Centro Sportivo Alagoano.

== Post-retirement ==
Gajardo went on playing football at amateur level, taking part of Mini Mundial, a traditional championship in his city of birth. In addition, he has supported football activities for children in the same city.

He also has been involved in fishing as a seashore harvester.
