= 1997 Campeonato Nacional Primera B =

Primera B de Chile
- Season: 1997
- Champions: Everton
- Promoted: Everton
- Top goalscorer: Ramón Castillo (13)

The 1997 Primera B season was the 46th completed season of the Primera B de Chile.

== Torneo Apertura ==
Everton became the tournament’s champion after beating Rangers in the tie-breaker final.

Pos	Team	Pld	W	D	L	GF	GA	GD	Pts
1	Everton	15	12	2	1	34	12	+22	38
2	Rangers	15	12	2	1	31	11	+20	38
3	Deportes Iquique	15	11	1	3	35	15	+20	34
4	O'Higgins	15	8	2	5	21	21	0	26
5	Fernández Vial	15	6	6	3	24	19	+5	24
6	Cobresal	15	6	5	4	30	23	+7	23
7	Santiago Morning	15	6	4	5	27	25	+2	22
8	Deportes Arica	15	6	4	5	24	23	+1	22
9	Deportes Linares	15	5	4	6	20	21	−1	19
10	Deportes Melipilla	15	5	3	7	16	21	−5	18
11	Regional Atacama	15	4	2	9	18	33	−15	14
12	Unión San Felipe	15	3	3	9	16	32	−16	12
13	Magallanes	15	3	2	10	23	33	−10	11
14	Ñublense	15	2	5	8	23	38	−15	11
15	Unión Santa Cruz	15	1	7	7	12	20	−8	10
16	Deportes Ovalle	15	1	7	7	7	15	−8	10

== Torneo Clausura ==
Deportes Iquique was tournament’s champion.

Pos	Team	Pld	W	D	L	GF	GA	GD	Pts
1	Deportes Iquique	15	10	3	2	35	20	+15	33
2	Everton	15	10	2	3	32	18	+14	32
3	O'Higgins	15	8	6	1	28	17	+11	30
4	Santiago Morning	15	8	3	4	23	19	+4	27
5	Rangers	15	7	5	3	22	13	+9	26
6	Cobresal	15	7	2	6	41	25	+16	23
7	Deportes Ovalle	15	6	4	5	22	21	+1	22
8	Deportes Melipilla	15	6	2	7	18	24	−6	20
9	Unión San Felipe	15	5	3	7	21	31	−10	18
10	Regional Atacama	15	5	2	8	21	24	−3	17
11	Magallanes	15	5	2	8	19	24	−5	17
12	Deportes Linares	15	5	2	8	24	32	−8	17
13	Fernández Vial	15	4	2	9	17	23	−6	14
14	Deportes Arica	15	4	2	9	22	31	−9	14
15	Ñublense	15	4	2	9	14	29	−15	14
16	Unión Santa Cruz	15	3	4	8	17	25	−8	13

== Annual table ==
Pos	Team	Pld	W	D	L	GF	GA	GD	Pts	Relegation
1	Everton	30	22	4	4	66	30	+36	70	
2	Deportes Iquique	30	21	4	5	70	35	+35	67	
3	Rangers	30	19	7	4	53	23	+30	64	
4	O'Higgins	30	16	8	6	49	38	+11	56	
5	Santiago Morning	30	14	7	9	50	44	+6	49	
6	Cobresal	30	13	7	10	71	48	+23	46	
7	Fernández Vial	30	10	8	12	41	42	−1	38	
8	Deportes Melipilla	30	11	5	14	34	45	−11	38	
9	Deportes Arica	30	10	6	14	46	54	−8	36	
10	Deportes Linares	30	10	6	14	44	52	−8	36	
11	Deportes Ovalle	30	7	11	12	29	36	−7	32	
12	Regional Atacama	30	9	4	17	39	57	−18	31	
13	Unión San Felipe	30	8	6	16	37	63	−26	30	
14	Magallanes	30	8	4	18	42	58	−16	28	
15	Ñublense	30	6	7	17	37	67	−30	25	
16	Unión Santa Cruz	30	4	11	15	29	45	−16	23	Relegated to Tercera División de Chile
