= Luis Vidal (footballer, born 1952) =

Chilean footballer

Personal information
- Full name: Luis Alberto Vidal Gajardo
- Date of birth: 22 May 1952 (age 74)
- Place of birth: Recoleta, Santiago, Chile
- Position: Centre-back

Youth career
- Municipal de Santiago

Senior career*
Years	Team	Apps	(Gls)
1970	Municipal de Santiago		
1971	Audax Italiano	1	(0)
1972	San Antonio Unido		
1973–1974	Unión San Felipe	52	(1)
1975	Santiago Morning	14	(1)
1976–1977	Malleco Unido		
1978–1979	Naval	16	(0)
1980	Curicó Unido		
1981	Naval	–	(–)
1981	→ Santiago Wanderers (loan)		
1982	9 de Octubre		
1983	San Luis		
1984	Deportes Puerto Montt		
1985	Deportes Valdivia		
1986	Deportes Puerto Montt		

International career
1971	Chile U20		
- * Club domestic league appearances and goals

Luis Alberto Vidal Gajardo (born 22 May 1952) is a Chilean former footballer who played as a centre-back for clubs in Chile and Ecuador.

== Club career ==
A defender from Municipal de Santiago youth system, Vidal played for several clubs in the Chilean football. In the top division, he made appearances for Audax Italiano (1971), Unión San Felipe (1973–74), Santiago Morning (1975), and Naval (1979).

In the second level, he played for San Antonio Unido (1972), Santiago Wanderers (loan from Naval, 1981) San Luis de Quillota (1983), Deportes Puerto Montt (1984, 1986), among others.

Abroad, he played for 9 de Octubre in the Ecuadorian Serie A in 1982.

At international level, he took part of a Chile youth team coached by José Santos Arias, alongside players such as Mario Galindo, Luis Araneda, Héctor Pinto and Carlos Rivas.

== Personal life ==
Vidal has worked as a caretaker for Colegio Marista (Marista School) from Curicó.
