= Miguel Ángel Castillo =

Chilean footballer (born 1972)

Personal information
- Full name: Miguel Ángel Castillo Sanhueza
- Date of birth: 25 August 1972 (age 54)
- Place of birth: Santiago, Chile
- Height: 1.68 m (5 ft 6 in)
- Position: Midfielder

Youth career
- Palestino

Senior career*
Years	Team	Apps	(Gls)
1991–1999	Palestino	120	(30)
1995	→ Colchagua (loan)	14	(0)
2000	León	7	(0)
2000	Huachipato	26	(4)
2001	Palestino	26	(4)
2002–2003	Unión San Felipe	10	(0)
2004	Naval	25	(2)
2005	Deportes La Serena	20	(6)
2006	Jorge Wilstermann	8	(0)
2007	San Luis	31	(1)
Total		287	(47)

International career
2001	Chile	1	(0)

Managerial career
- 2015–2017: San Bernardo Unido
- * Club domestic league appearances and goals

Miguel Ángel Castillo Sanhueza (born 25 August 1972) is a Chilean former professional footballer who played as a midfielder for clubs in Chile, Mexico and Bolivia.

== Club career ==
A left-foot midfielder, Castillo is a product of Palestino youth system, playing for the club in three stints, scoring a total of 34 goals.

In Chile he also played for Huachipato, Unión San Felipe and Deportes La Serena in the Chilean Primera División. In the Primera B, he played for Colchagua, Naval and San Luis de Quillota.

Abroad, he played for the Mexican club León and the Bolivian club Jorge Wilstermann.

== International career ==
In 2001, Castillo made an appearance for the Chile national team in the 2002 FIFA World Cup qualification match against Bolivia on 14 August.

== Coaching career ==
He worked as manager of San Bernardo Unido in the Chilean Tercera B from 2015 to 2017.
