= Judiciary of Chile =

Judiciary flag of Chile

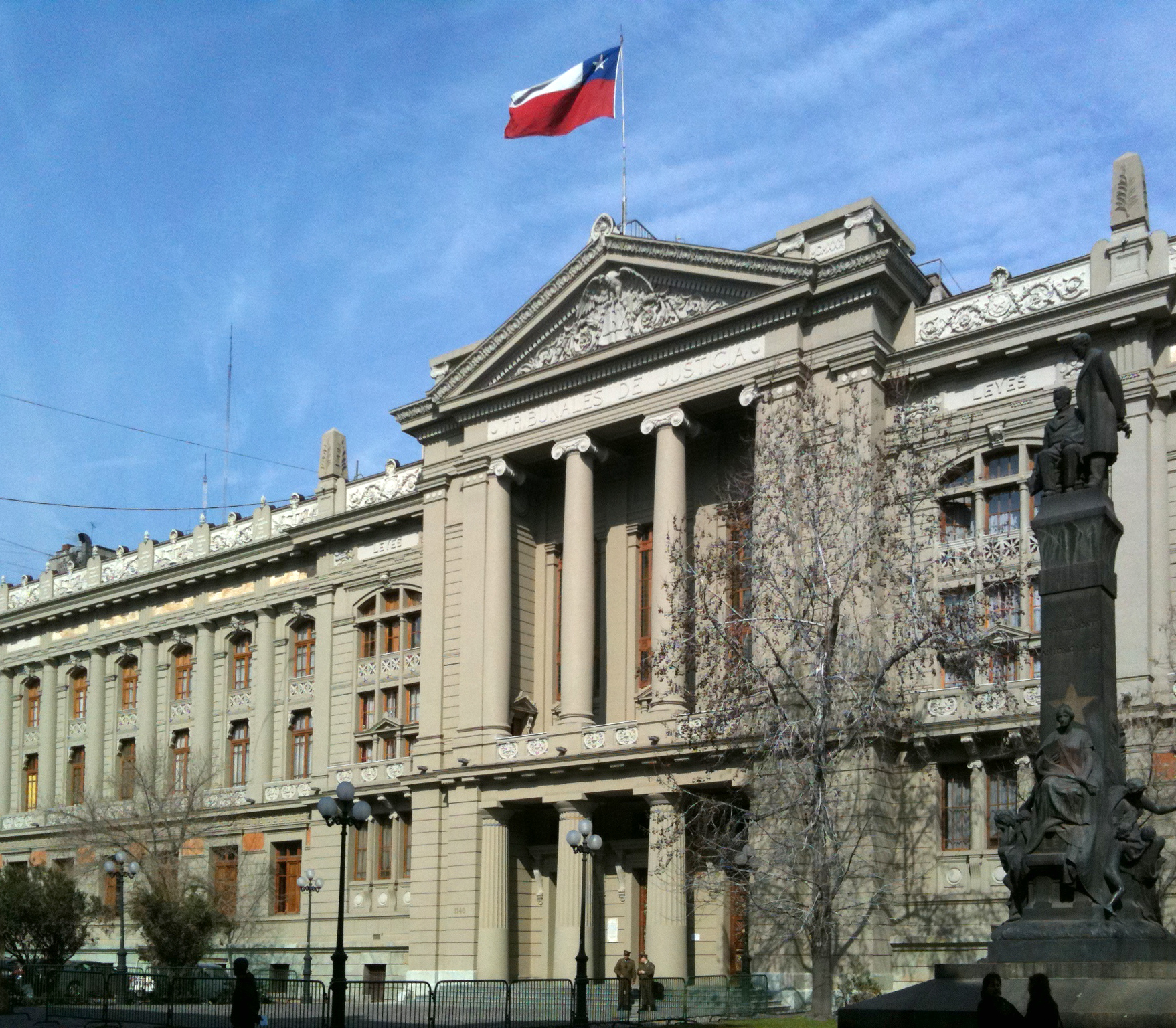
Justice Courts Palace (Palacio de los Tribunales de Justicia) in Santiago.

The judiciary of the Republic of Chile includes one Supreme Court, one Constitutional Court, 17 Courts of Appeal, 84 Oral Criminal Tribunals and Guarantee Judges; 7 Military Tribunals; over 300 Local Police Courts; and many other specialized Tribunals and courts in matter of family, labor, customs, taxes, electoral affairs, etc.

The law provides for an independent judiciary, and the government generally respected this provision in practice.

Chile's legal system is civil law based. It is primarily based on the Chilean Civil Code of 1855, derived from Spanish law and other codes of Continental Europe of the 19th century.

Chilean process provides for a very limited judicial review of legislative acts in the Constitutional Court. It does not accept compulsory International Court of Justice (ICJ) jurisdiction.

== History ==
The Palacio de la Real Audiencia de Santiago, now the National History Museum of Chile, was built between 1804 and 1807 to serve as the home for the royal courts of justice.

From the year 2000 onwards, Chile completely overhauled its criminal justice system with the implementation of a new, German-inspired, adversarial system, gradually implemented throughout the country, with the final stage of implementation in the Santiago Metropolitan Region completed on June 16, 2005.

On 4 September 2013, a week before the 40th anniversary of the coup that brought General Pinochet to power, the National Association of Magistrates of the Judiciary apologised for abandoning its role in protecting basic rights during Chile's military rule in the 1970s and 1980s.

== Supreme Court ==
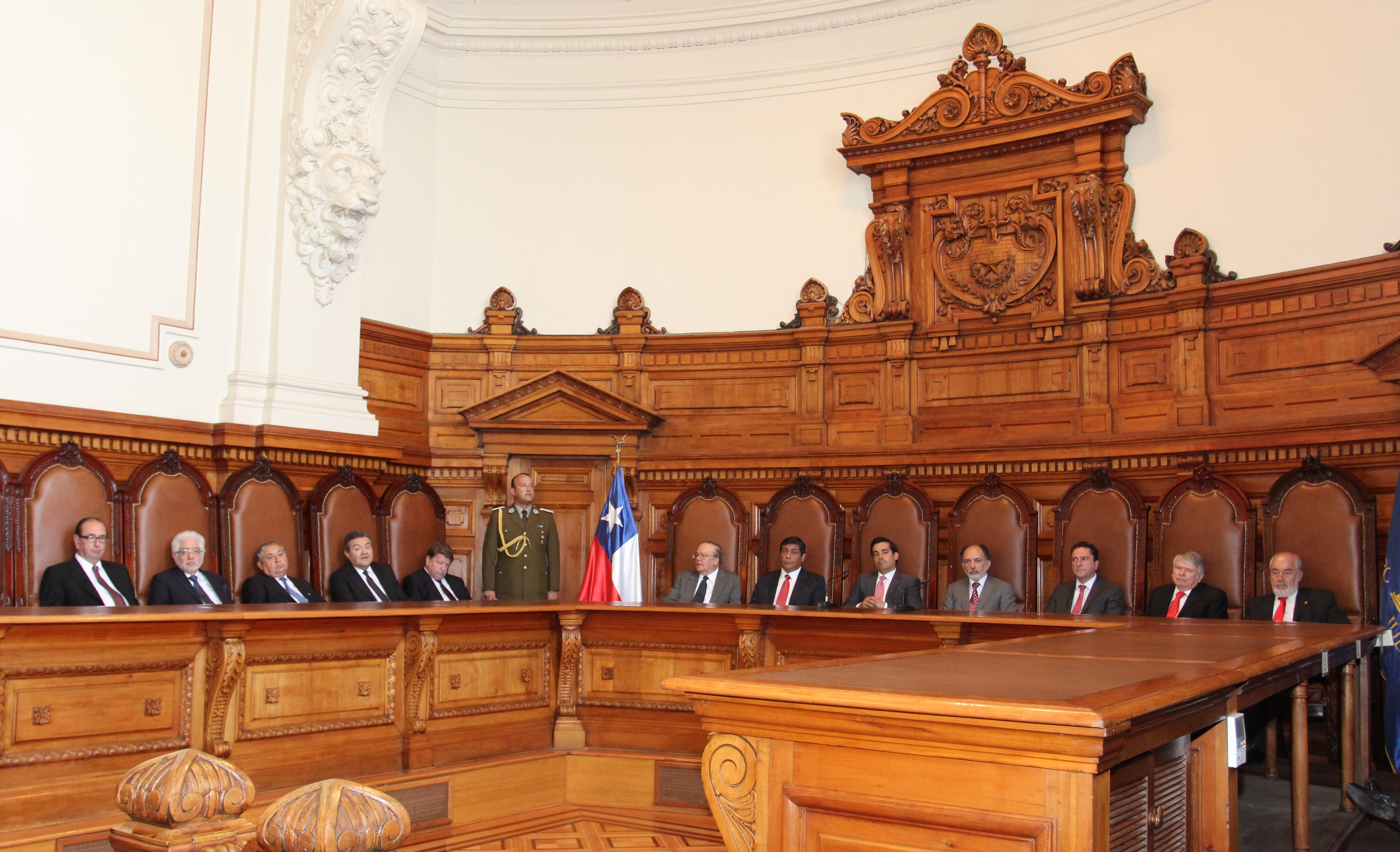
Plenary courtroom of the Supreme Court.

The head of the Chilean Judiciary System is the Supreme Court of Justice, a body integrated by twenty-one members called "Ministers" (Ministros), one of them is elected by its peers as the President for a two-year period. Supreme Court's Ministers are designated by the President of the Republic, who chooses from five candidates proposed by the Supreme Court, with the agreement of the Senate.

Of the twenty-one members of the Supreme Court, sixteen must be judges of Courts of Appeal and five must be lawyers not related to the judiciary system. All members must be lawyers with at least fifteen years of professional exercise, with a distinguished professional or academical career and several other requirements established by the law.

The Supreme Court of Justice is in charge of the directive, correctional and economical superintendence of all the courts of the country, save the Constitutional Court, the National Board of Elections and the Regional Boards of Elections.

According to the Organic Code of Courts, the Supreme Court is officially referred to as "Excellence" (Excelencia) and its Ministers as "Your Honor" (Su Señoría), just like all other judges.

Cases submitted to the knowledge of the Supreme Court can be examined in two ways: in plenary of at least eleven Ministers or in chambers of at least five Ministers. The regular operation of the Court is in four chambers of five Ministers, at least three of them must be judges, while the other two can be lawyers or judges.

One of the most important functions of the Supreme Court is acting as a Court of Cassation, seeking the standard application of the law to all alike cases, in order to maintain a uniform interpretation of the law throughout the country.

According to Chilean civil law system, the sentence of one judge only affects the case on which such sentence was dictated, nevertheless, the decisions of the Supreme Court are a strong precedent which is usually replicated by the lower instance courts and judges when deciding about similar cases.

== Courts of Appeal ==
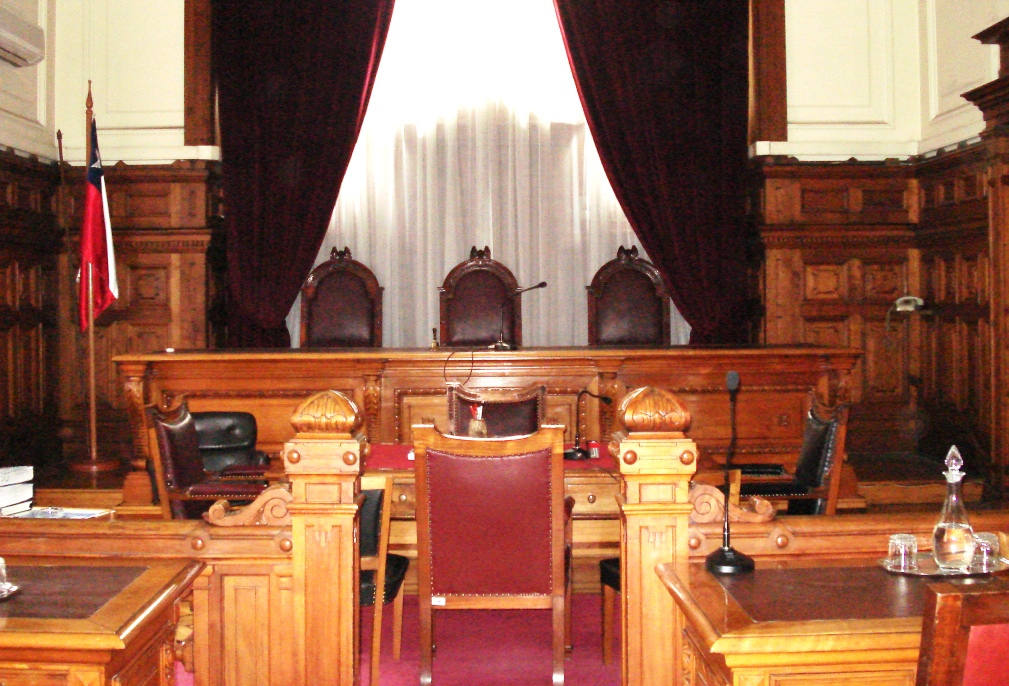
One of the rooms of the Courts of Appeals of Santiago.

=== Court of Appeal ===
There are seventeen Courts of Appeal in Chile, each of them integrated by a variable number of judges, between four and thirty-one, called "Ministers" (Ministros), one of them is the President of the Court.

These collegiate courts usually operate in chambers of at least three judges, exceptionally may operate as a plenary with the presence of the absolute majority of the members of the court.

The Courts of Appeal are the hierarchical superiors to the Courts of Letters, the Courts of Guarantee, the Oral Criminal Tribunals, Family Courts, Labour Courts, Labour Courts of Collection, and Local Police Courts.

They hold almost all the second instance competence, besides knowing well in the first instance or single instance of other matters that the laws entrusted to them.

=== Minister of Appeal ===
Each Minister of a Court of Appeal is a Court himself, knowing in the first instance of certain affairs that the laws entrusted to them.

Even though the law has given all of the competence in the first instance to the Judges of Letters, a Minister of Appeal will try should certain exceptional circumstances are fulfilled, regarding the nature of the issue or the quality or state of the individuals involved.

== Criminal justice system ==
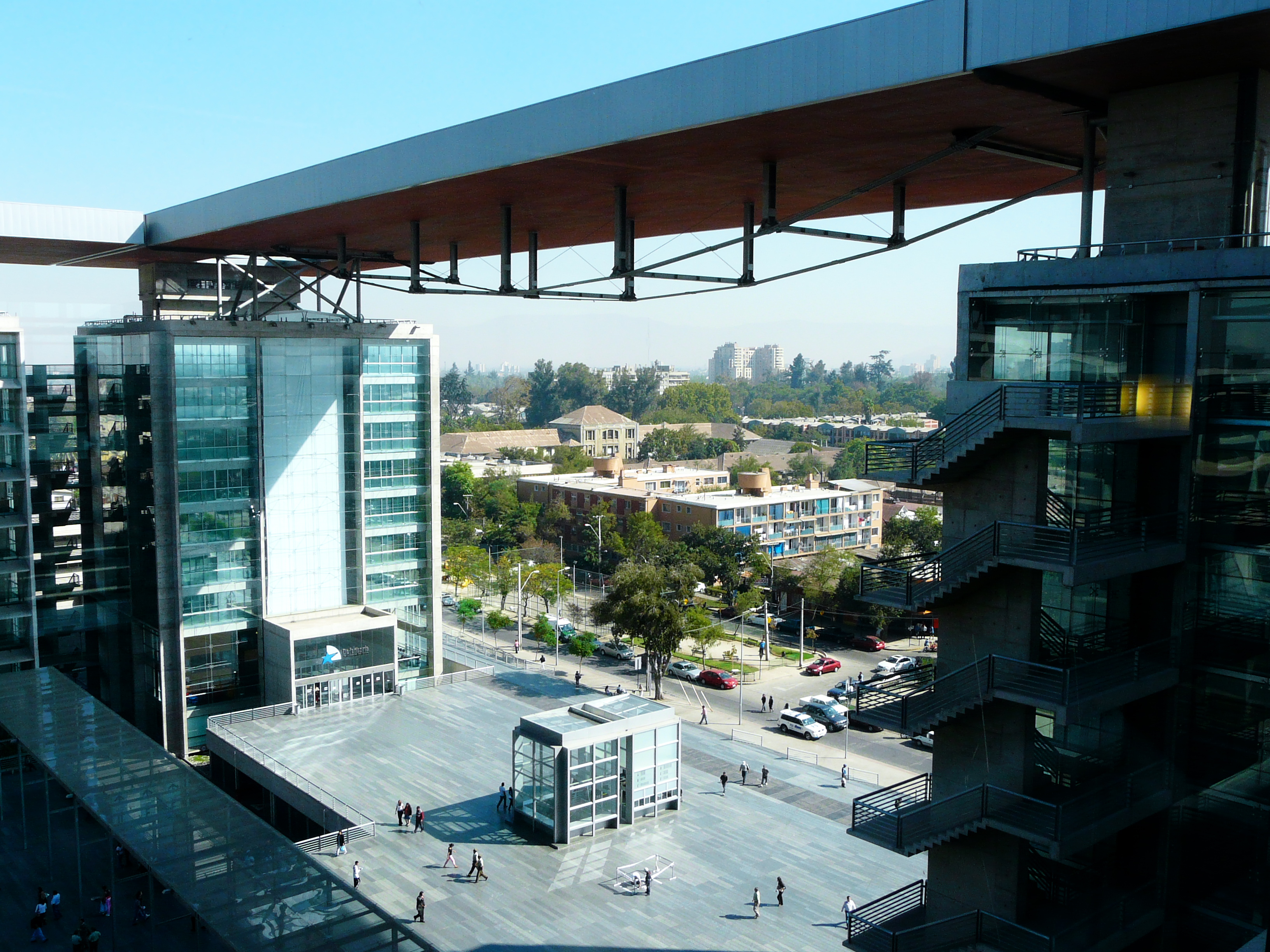
The "Santiago Justice Center" is the place of all the Guarantee Courts and Criminal Courts of Oral Judgments in the Santiago Province. The right wing of the building is also the Headquarters of the Public Ministry and the office of the National Attorney of Chile.

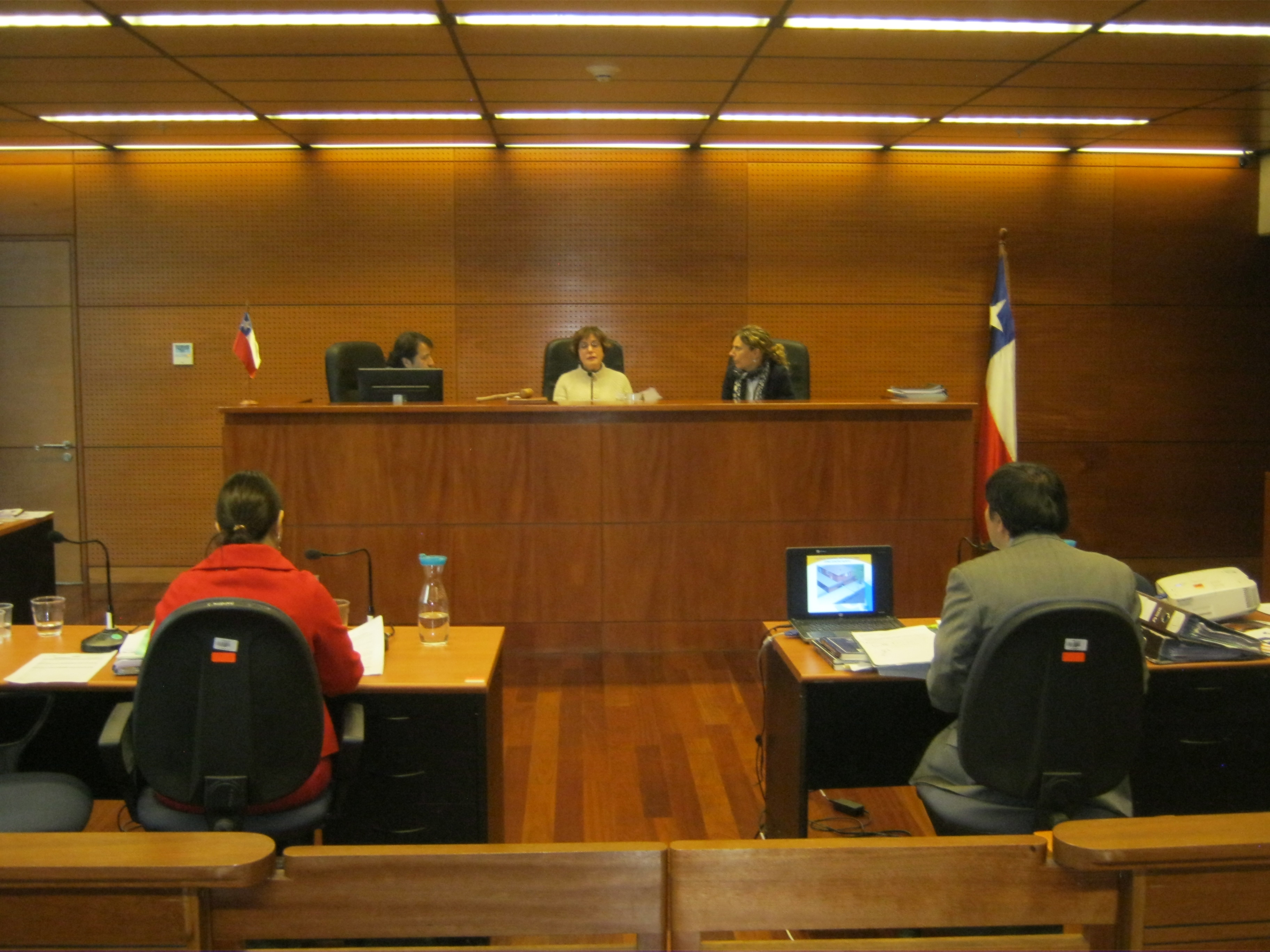
Courtroom of a Criminal Court of Oral Judgments in Santiago.

=== Public Ministry ===
The Prosecution, or Public Ministry, is an autonomous public organism, whose function is to direct the investigation of the crimes, take the offenders to the Courts, if applicable, and to offer protection to victims and witnesses.

The Prosecution is not a part of any of the other branches of the government, it is not part of the Congress, the Executive Branch or the Judiciary.

The institution is organized in 18 Regional Prosecutions, each one of them directed by a regional prosecutor and a directive team. The operative units of the 18 Regional Prosecutions are the 150 Local Prosecutions which are distributed throughout the country according to population density. Such units are composed by deputy prosecutors, assistant prosecutors and other professionals, such as psychologists, caseworkers, administrative personnel and technicians.

The criminal system is directed by the prosecutors, who are in charge of the investigation of crimes, directing the labor of the police forces.

=== Guarantee Courts ===
While the Prosecution is in exclusive charge of the functions of investigation and accusation, the guarantee judges have the exclusive task of judging, they have no power to investigate crimes, only to try them.

During the investigative phase, a Guarantee Judge takes charge of the protection of the rights of the people involved in the case, specially the guarantee of the accused, as well as resolving the conflicts that arise between the different parts during this stage. Several proceedings of the Prosecution need previous approval by the Guarantee Court.

Once enough proof is gathered, the Prosecution will decide whether to indict the accused or file the case.

For most minor offenses and some simple crimes for which the prosecutor in the Attorney General sought the imposition of a penalty of up to 540 days of imprisonment, the case is judged by the Guarantee Judge in a summary trial.

=== Criminal Courts of Oral Judgments ===
Criminal Courts are integrated by three professional judges, who hear the cases exposed by the Prosecutor and the Defense of the accused, then deciding and establishing the guilt or innocence of the accused. Such scheme aims to provide the highest impartiality level of the Courts. There's no appeal nor second - instance revision of the sentences dictated by an Oral Criminal Court, the only remedy is its annulment by a Court of Appeals, which is uncommon.

== Family Justice System ==
=== Competence ===
The Family Judicial System has competence over matters related to custody of children, visiting arrangements of the children, alimony, maintenance or spousal support; parental rights, authorization to take the children out of the country, adoption, protective measures for children and teenagers, criminal offenses committed by minors exempt of criminal responsibility; fatherhood, divorce, marriage annulment, domestic violence, separation of assets, interdictions and any other issue arising from personal family relations.

=== Family Tribunals ===
There's a system of specialized professional courts exclusively dedicated to take charge of family conflicts in an integral and multidisciplinary approach, counting with the permanent assessment of psychologists and caseworkers specialized on family issues.

The procedures are totally oral, transparent and immediate, therefore, the judge and all the parts of the trial must be present in all audiences and the actuations must be done without the intervention of intermediaries.

The trial consists of, basically, two audiences: the first is called "Preparatory", if the parts do not come to a specific agreement in such instance, the demand is submitted to the ratification of the demanding part, then the counterpart is given its chance to answer to it. By the end of the audience, the judge will decide about the relief measures and, if it is possible, will offer the parts a chance of mediation of conciliation. The judge will also set the object of the trial, the facts that will be object of proof, the admissible means of evidence and, finally, will set the date of the Audience of Trial.

In the Audience of Trial, the parts will exhibit its evidence to the judge, such as witnesses, confessions, documents, medical records, and all other non regulated evidence. At the end of the audience, the judge will dictate an oral sentence, which can be written immediately or in a period of five days.

=== Mediation Institutes ===
They seek agreements between the parts involved, the so-called "cooperative agreements", through compromises, conciliation and, specially, mediation, is a very important goal of the system, so a National System of Mediation was established for such purpose. The primary goal of this system is to reduce the emotional costs of the conflict and obtain a personal and voluntary compromise of those involved, in order to reach a sustainable and amicable relation for the future.

== Trial procedures ==
The criminal procedural law provides for the right to a fair trial and an independent judiciary generally enforced this right. National and regional prosecutors investigate crimes, formulate charges, and prosecute cases. Three-judge panels form the court of first instance; the process is oral and adversarial, trials are public, and judges rule on guilt and dictate sentences. Court records, rulings, and findings were generally accessible to the public.

In all cases, the law provides for the right to legal counsel and public defender's offices in all fifteen Regions and the Santiago Metropolitan Region, provide free professional legal counsel to anyone seeking such assistance. When requested by other human rights organizations or family members, the NGO Corporation for the Promotion and Defense of the Rights of the People and other lawyers working pro bono assisted detainees during interrogations and represented some persons charged with terrorist acts in court. Defendants enjoy a presumption of innocence and have a right of appeal.

If formal charges are filed in civilian courts against a member of the military or police, for acts performed on duty, the military prosecutor can ask for jurisdiction, which the Supreme Court occasionally granted. This was particularly significant in human rights cases from the period covered by the Amnesty Law, since military courts were more likely to grant amnesty without a full investigation. Military courts have the authority to charge and try civilians for terrorist acts, aggressions against on duty police or military personnel, and sedition. Persons arrested during demonstrations for assaulting a police officer also are brought before military tribunals.

Civilians prosecuted in military courts have the same legal protections as those prosecuted in civilian courts. They are entitled to counsel, the charges are public, the sentencing guidelines are the same (with the exception that the death penalty can be imposed in a military court during wartime but never in a civilian court), and the Supreme Court ultimately may hear appeals. A military prosecutor formulates charges and conducts the investigation, and the first instance of appeal is in a court-martial, composed of two civilian and three military judges.

== Civil judicial procedures and remedies ==
While there is an independent and impartial judiciary in civil matters, which permits access for lawsuits regarding human rights violations, modernization of the judiciary has yet to affect the civil justice system, which was characterized by antiquated and inefficient procedures. Courts were overwhelmed by more than 800,000 new cases each year. The average civil trial lasts more than five years, and civil suits could continue for decades. Additionally, only 8 percent of lawsuits result in a definitive sentence or court-imposed settlement. Of the rest, 90 percent are eventually resolved through mediation outside the courts or settlement between the parties.
