= Supreme Court of Chile =

Highest court in Chile

- Corte Suprema de Justicia de Chile
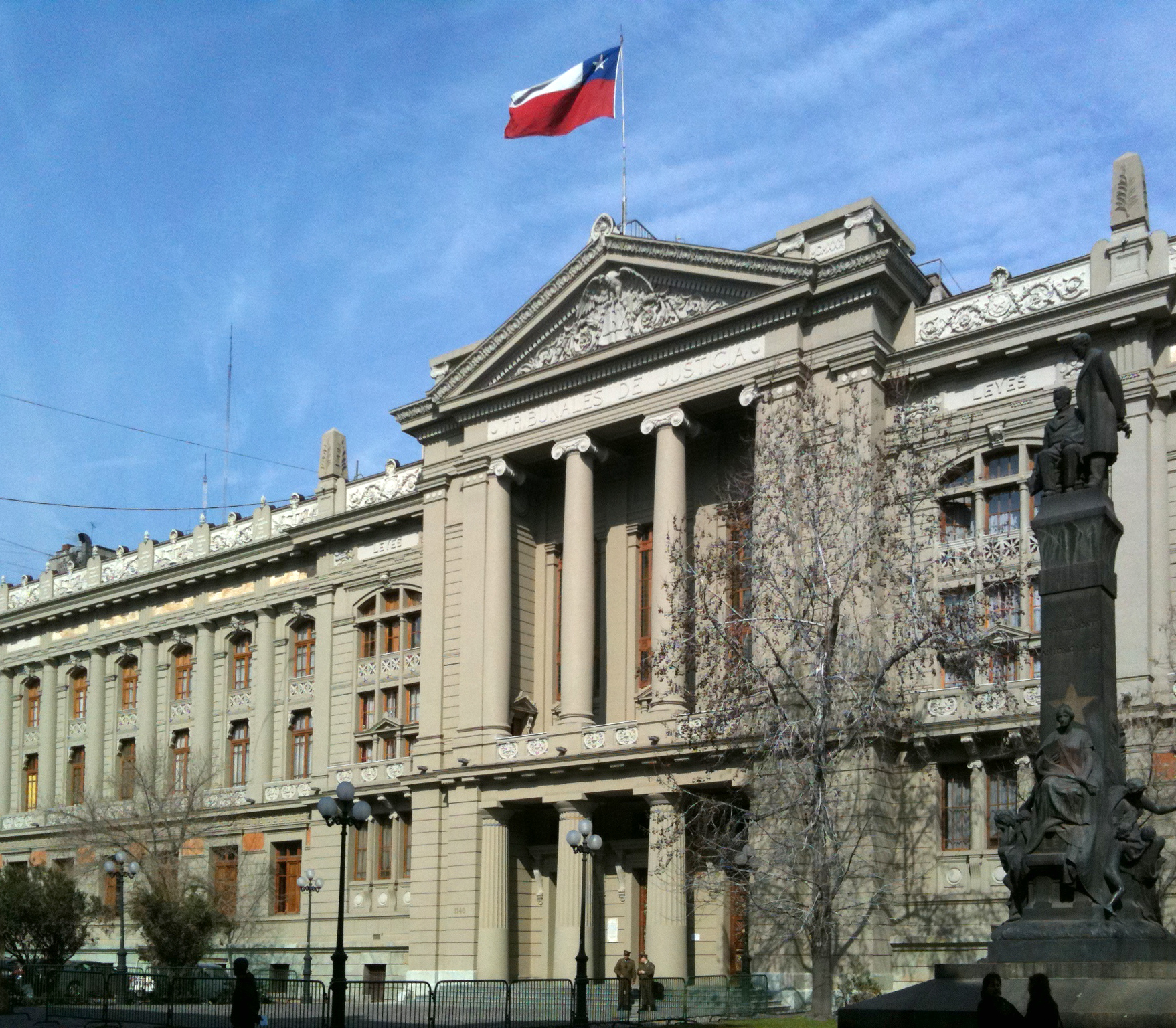
- The Justice Courts Palace (Palacio de los Tribunales de Justicia) in Santiago, seat of the Supreme Court and the Court of Appeals of Santiago
- Interactive map of Supreme Court of Chile
- 33.4391964°S 70.6531933°W
- Established: December 29, 1823; 202 years ago
- Location: Santiago
- Coordinates: 33.4391964°S 70.6531933°W
- Composition method: Ministers are nominated by the Court itself, appointed by the President and confirmed by the Senate
- Authorised by: Constitution of Chile
- Judge term length: 75 years old or until ceasing in good conduct
- Number of positions: 21
- Website: pjud.cl

President of the Supreme Court
- Currently: Gloria Ana Chevesich
- Since: 2026

The Supreme Court of Chile is the highest court in Chile. It also administers the lower courts in the nation. It is located in the capital Santiago.

In the Chilean system, the court lacks the broader power of judicial review—it cannot set binding precedent or invalidate laws. Instead, it acts on a case-by-case basis. Trials are carried out in salas, chambers of at least five judges, presided over by the most senior member.

== Membership ==
The members of the Supreme Court are appointed by the President from a list of five choices prepared by the sitting members of the court. Two of the choices must be senior judges from appellate courts; the other three may have no judicial experience. The president's choice must then be ratified by a two-thirds majority of the Senate.

Supreme Court justices must be at least 36 years old. Once appointed, a Chilean Supreme Court justice is entitled to remain on the Court until the compulsory retirement age of 75. The only exception is if a justice can be removed by "notorious abandonment of duty," as deemed by a majority of both chambers of Congress.

=== Current Supreme Court members ===
The Supreme Court has twenty-one members, called ministers (ministros). One member is selected to serve a two-year term as President of the Supreme Court. The composition of the Supreme Court changes relatively quickly, as judges attain the retirement age of 75.

Note: List last updated on 21 August 2023.

Justice	End of mandate
Juan Eduardo Fuentes Belamar (President)	2024
Sergio Manuel Muñoz Gajardo	2032
Haroldo Osvaldo Brito Cruz	2023
Ricardo Luis Hernán Blanco Herrera	2029
Gloria Ana Chevesich Ruiz	2028
Andrea María Mercedes Muñoz Sánchez	2032
Manuel Antonio Valderrama Rebolledo	2031
Jorge Gonzalo Dahm Oyarzún	2023
Arturo Jose Prado Puga	2030
Ángela Francisca Vivanco Martínez	2038
Mauricio Alonso Silva Cancino	2028
María Angélica Cecilia Repetto García	2028
Leopoldo Andrés Llanos Sagrista	Unknown
Adelita Inés Ravanales Arriagada	2039
Mario Rolando Carroza Espinosa	2026
María Teresa de Jesús Letelier Ramírez	2025
Jean Pierre Matus Acuña	2042
Maria Cristina Gajardo Harboe	Unknown
Carlos Ramón Aránguiz Zúñiga	2028
Diego Gonzalo Simpértigue Limare	2031
María Soledad Melo Labra	Unknown

== Notable decisions ==
=== Augusto Pinochet ===
The Chilean Supreme Court has been involved in many important human rights cases regarding the former Chilean dictator Augusto Pinochet.

- In July 2002, it dismissed a case against Pinochet, saying that he was unfit to stand trial due to dementia.
- In August 2004, it confirmed a lower court's decision that Pinochet should lose his automatic immunity he acquired from being a former senator.
- In March 2005, it reversed a lower court's decision stripping Pinochet of immunity in the case of the assassination of Carlos Prats.
- In August 2007, it upheld the life sentence of Hugo Salas Wenzel, who had been the first senior official to be sentenced to life in prison for human rights violations conducted during the reign of Pinochet.

=== Gay rights ===
The Chilean Supreme Court has made controversial decisions in the area of gay rights.

- In 2004, it confirmed a lower court's decision that stripped former judge Karen Atala of custody of her three daughters because she is a lesbian. In 2012, the case was overturned by the Inter-American Court of Human Rights.
- In January 2004, it removed judge Daniel Calvo from his position on the Santiago Court of Appeals, after media reports that he visited a sauna frequented by gay men. (See Spiniak Case.)

=== Women's health ===
- In November 2005, the Chilean Supreme Court ruled that the sale of contraceptive morning-after pill Postinor 2 is constitutional.

=== Alberto Fujimori ===
On September 21, 2007, the court accepted Peru's request to extradite former president Alberto Fujimori, on human rights and corruption charges.
