= List of Atlético Junior managers =

This is a list of all former and current managers of the Colombian football team Atlético Junior.

== Managers ==
- (England) Jack Greenwell (1940–42)
- (Colombia) Roberto Meléndez (1948)
- (Brazil) Tim (1950–51)
- (Austria) Friedrich Donnenfeld (1951–53)
- (Brazil) Marinho Rodrigues (1966)
- (Colombia) Antonio de la Hoz (1966)
- (Colombia) Narciso Pino (1966)
- (Colombia) Efraín Sánchez (1966–67)
- (Uruguay) William Martínez (1967)
- (Uruguay) Luis Alberto Miloc (1967–68)
- (Argentina) Julio Tocker (1969)
- (Brazil) Othon Dacunha (1969)
- (Uruguay) Luis Alberto Miloc (1969–71)
- (Colombia) Efraín Sánchez (1971)
- (Brazil) Marinho Rodrigues (1972)
- (Colombia) Marcos Coll (1973)
- (Brazil) Rubens (1973)
- (Argentina) Francisco Villegas (1973)
- (Brazil) Marinho Rodrigues (1974)
- (Colombia) Marcos Coll (1975)
- (Colombia) Carlos Peña (1975)
- (Uruguay) Luis Alberto Miloc (1975)
- (Argentina) José Varacka (1975–77)
- (Colombia) Carlos Peña (1977)
- (Argentina) Juan Ramón Verón (1977)
- (Uruguay) Mario Patrón (1978)
- (Colombia) Carlos Peña (1978)
- (Argentina) Miguel Ángel López (1978)
- (Colombia) Carlos Peña (1978)
- (Argentina) Vladislao Cap (1978)
- (Argentina) Juan Ramón Verón (1979)
- (Argentina) José Varacka (1980–81)
- (Colombia) Marcos Coll (1981)
- (Colombia) Carlos Peña (1981)
- (Argentina) Néstor Manfredi (1981–82)
- (Colombia) Marcos Coll (1982)
- (Argentina) Néstor Manfredi (1982)
- (Brazil) Othon Dacunha (1982)
- (Argentina) Jorge Solari (1983)
- (Argentina) José Varacka (1984)
- (Argentina) Roberto Saporiti (1985)
- (Argentina) Eduardo Solari (1986)
- (Colombia) Efraín Sánchez (1986–87)
- (Colombia) Carlos Peña (1987)
- (Argentina) José Varacka (1987–88)
- (Colombia) Carlos Peña (1988)
- (Argentina) Miguel Ángel López (1988–89)
- (Colombia) Carlos Peña (1990)
- (Colombia) Hugo Gallego (1990)
- (Uruguay) (Colombia) Julio Comesaña (1991)
- (Argentina) Miguel Ángel López (1992)
- (Colombia) Dulio Miranda (1992)
- (Colombia) Carlos Peña (1992)
- (Uruguay) (Colombia) Julio Comesaña (1992–94)
- (Colombia) Dulio Miranda (1994)
- (Colombia) Carlos Restrepo (1995)
- (Colombia) Luis Augusto García (1995–96)
- (Uruguay) Juan Mujica (1995–96)
- (Uruguay) (Colombia) Julio Comesaña (1996–97)
- (Colombia) Luis Grau (1996–97)
- (Peru) Julio César Uribe (1996–97)
- (Colombia) Javier Castell (1998)
- (Argentina) Miguel Ángel López (1998–Feb 00)
- (Colombia) Juan José Peláez (Feb 2000–June 00)
- (Colombia) Norberto Peluffo (July 2000–Sept 01)
- (Colombia) Dulio Miranda (interim) (Sept 2001)
- (Argentina) Salvador Capitano (Sept 2001–31 Dec 2001)
- (Colombia) Luis Grau (interim) (Feb 2002)
- (Colombia) Dulio Miranda (Feb 2002)
- (Uruguay) (Colombia) Julio Comesaña (March 2002–Sept 02)
- (Colombia) Alexis Mendoza (interim) (Sept 2002)
- (Serbia and Montenegro) Dragan Miranović (Feb 2003–June 3)
- (Serbia and Montenegro) Dušan Drašković (July 2003–Aug 03)
- (Brazil) Othon Dacunha (interim) (Aug 2003)
- (Colombia) Jorge Luis Pinto (Aug 2003–June 4)
- (Argentina) Miguel Ángel López (Aug 2004–May 5)
- (Argentina) Carlos Ischia (July 2005–Sept 05)
- (Colombia) Norberto Peluffo (Sept 2005–April 6)
- (Colombia) Jorge Alcázar (interim) (April 2006–May 6)
- (Serbia) Dragan Miranović (July 2006–Oct 06)
- (Argentina) Miguel Ángel López (Oct 2006–May 7)
- (Colombia) Luis Grau (July 2007–Nov 08)
- (Colombia) Santiago Escobar (1 Jan 2008 – 1 March 2008)
- (Uruguay) (Colombia) Julio Comesaña (11 March 2008 – 31 Dec 2009)
- (Colombia) Diego Umaña (1 Jan 2010 – 31 Dec 2010)
- (Argentina) (Colombia) Ó.H. Quintabani (16 Nov 2010 – 30 May 2011)
- (Colombia) Fernel Díaz (interim) (May 2011–June 11)
- (Colombia) Jorge Luis Pinto (1 June 2011 – 31 Aug 2011)
- (Colombia) José "Cheché" Hernández (Sept 1, 2011–31 Dec 2012)
- (Colombia) Alexis García (1 Jan 2013 – 4 June 2013)
- (Argentina) Miguel Ángel López (5 June 2013 – 19 March 2014)
- (Colombia) David Pinillos (May 2014)
- (Uruguay) (Colombia) Julio Comesaña (May 2014–Dec 14)
- (Colombia) Alexis Mendoza (Jan 2015–July 2016)
- (Colombia) Giovanni Hernández (25 July 2016 – 21 November 2016)
- (Colombia) Alberto Gamero (27 December 2016 – 26 March 2017)
- (Uruguay) (Colombia) Julio Comesaña (1 April 2017 – 5 December 2017)
- (Colombia) Alexis Mendoza (14 December 2017 – 9 April 2018)
- (Uruguay) (Colombia) Julio Comesaña (11 April 2018 – 19 December 2018)
- (Colombia) Luis Fernando Suárez (20 December 2018 – 3 May 2019)
- (Uruguay) (Colombia) Julio Comesaña (4 May 2019 – 14 September 2020)
- (Colombia) Luis Amaranto Perea (14 September 2020 – 17 August 2021)
- (Colombia) Arturo Reyes (17 August 2021 – 3 September 2024)
- (Venezuela) César Farías (3 September 2024 – 21 June 2025)
- (Uruguay) Alfredo Arias (23 June 2025 – 31 August 2026)
- (Uruguay) Sebastián Viera (1 September 2026 – Present)

Source: Worldfootball.net
