= Felipe Ortiz (footballer) =

Chilean footballer (born 2001)

Personal information
- Full name: Felipe Sebastián Ortiz Venegas
- Date of birth: 25 September 2001 (age 25)
- Place of birth: Curicó, Chile
- Height: 1.71 m (5 ft 7 in)
- Position: Attacking midfielder

Team information
- Current team: Lota Schwager
- Number: 18

Youth career
- Curicó Unido

Senior career*
Years	Team	Apps	(Gls)
2020–2025	Curicó Unido	103	(3)
2026–	Lota Schwager	1	(0)

International career
2022	Chile U23	1	(0)
- * Club domestic league appearances and goals as of 8 March 2026

Felipe Sebastián Ortiz Venegas (born 25 September 2001) is a Chilean footballer who plays as an attacking midfielder for Lota Schwager.

== Club career ==
A product of Curicó Unido youth system, Ortiz made his professional debut in the 2020 season making six appearances. During that first season he played alongside experienced players such as José Rojas and Leandro Benegas.

In March 2026, Ortiz joined Lota Schwager for the promotion playoff against Comunal Cabrero for the 2026 Segunda División Profesional de Chile.

== International career ==
In August 2022, Ortiz represented Chile at under-23 level in a friendly match against Peru U23 and has taken part of training microcycles.

== Honours ==
In December 2022, Ortiz was honored as one of the best athletes from his city of birth, Curicó, alongside Damián Muñoz, his coach in Curicó Unido, and Ivana González, the goalkeeper of the women's team.
