= 1997 Campeonato Nacional Primera División =

Chilean football season

Primera División
- Season: 1997
- Dates: 15 February 1997 - 21 December 1997
- Teams: 16
- Champions: Universidad Católica (Apertura), Colo-Colo (Clausura)
- Relegated: Unión Española; Deportes Antofagasta
- Copa Libertadores: Quarterfinals: Universidad Católica; Semifinals: Colo-Colo
- Supercopa Sudamericana: Semifinals: Colo-Colo
- Copa CONMEBOL: First Round: Universidad de Chile
- Top goalscorer: Apertura: (Argentina) David Bisconti (15); Clausura: (Paraguay) Richard Báez (10)

The 1997 tournament of the Primera División de Chile was based in the typical Apertura-Clausura scheme used in many football leagues in Latin-America, similar to the Argentinian First Division. For the first time, this format, with two champions, was used. This tournament format was dropped for the next season (1998), but came back, from 2002 to 2017.

Both champions qualified for the Copa Libertadores, while the two teams with fewest points overall relegated. The season started on 16 February 1997 and ended on 21 December 1997.

== Overall table ==
Pos	Team	Pld	W	D	L	GF	GA	GD	Pts	Qualification or relegation
1	Colo-Colo	30	22	6	2	60	31	+29	72	Qualified for the 1998 Copa Libertadores
2	Universidad Católica	30	20	7	3	61	28	+33	67	Qualified for the 1998 Copa Libertadores
3	Universidad de Chile	30	15	11	4	67	31	+36	56	
4	Cobreloa	30	13	8	9	54	39	+15	47	
5	Audax Italiano	30	12	8	10	51	40	+11	44	
6	Coquimbo Unido	30	11	8	11	43	39	+4	41	
7	Provincial Osorno	30	8	14	8	35	33	+2	38	
8	Deportes La Serena	30	10	7	13	44	45	−1	37	
9	Deportes Temuco	30	11	4	15	44	49	−5	37	
10	Huachipato	30	9	9	12	33	39	−6	36	
11	Palestino	30	9	6	15	25	45	−20	33	
12	Deportes Concepción	30	8	9	13	36	58	−22	33	
13	Deportes Puerto Montt	30	8	8	14	39	49	−10	32	
14	Santiago Wanderers	30	6	13	11	37	50	−13	31	
15	Unión Española	30	8	4	18	37	62	−25	28	Relegated to Segunda División Chilena
16	Deportes Antofagasta	30	7	4	19	29	58	−29	25	Relegated to Segunda División Chilena

== Torneo de Apertura ==
=== Table ===
Pos	Team	Pld	W	D	L	GF	GA	GD	Pts	Qualification
1	Universidad Católica	15	11	4	0	36	13	+23	37	Qualified for the Championship play-off
2	Colo-Colo	15	11	4	0	27	12	+15	37	Qualified for the Championship play-off
3	Universidad de Chile	15	8	6	1	31	14	+17	30	
4	Deportes Temuco	15	7	1	7	26	18	+8	22	
5	Cobreloa	15	6	4	5	26	22	+4	22	
6	Deportes Concepción	15	6	4	5	21	26	−5	22	
7	Huachipato	15	5	5	5	20	17	+3	20	
8	Coquimbo Unido	15	6	2	7	28	26	+2	20	
9	Santiago Wanderers	15	4	8	3	24	24	0	20	
10	Deportes La Serena	15	5	3	7	23	25	−2	18	
11	Provincial Osorno	15	3	8	4	16	18	−2	17	
12	Palestino	15	4	4	7	12	24	−12	16	
13	Audax Italiano	15	3	6	6	21	24	−3	15	
14	Unión Española	15	4	1	10	15	35	−20	13	
15	Deportes Puerto Montt	15	2	4	9	18	29	−11	10	
16	Deportes Antofagasta	15	2	2	11	14	31	−17	8	

Primera División de Chile
1997 Apertura champion
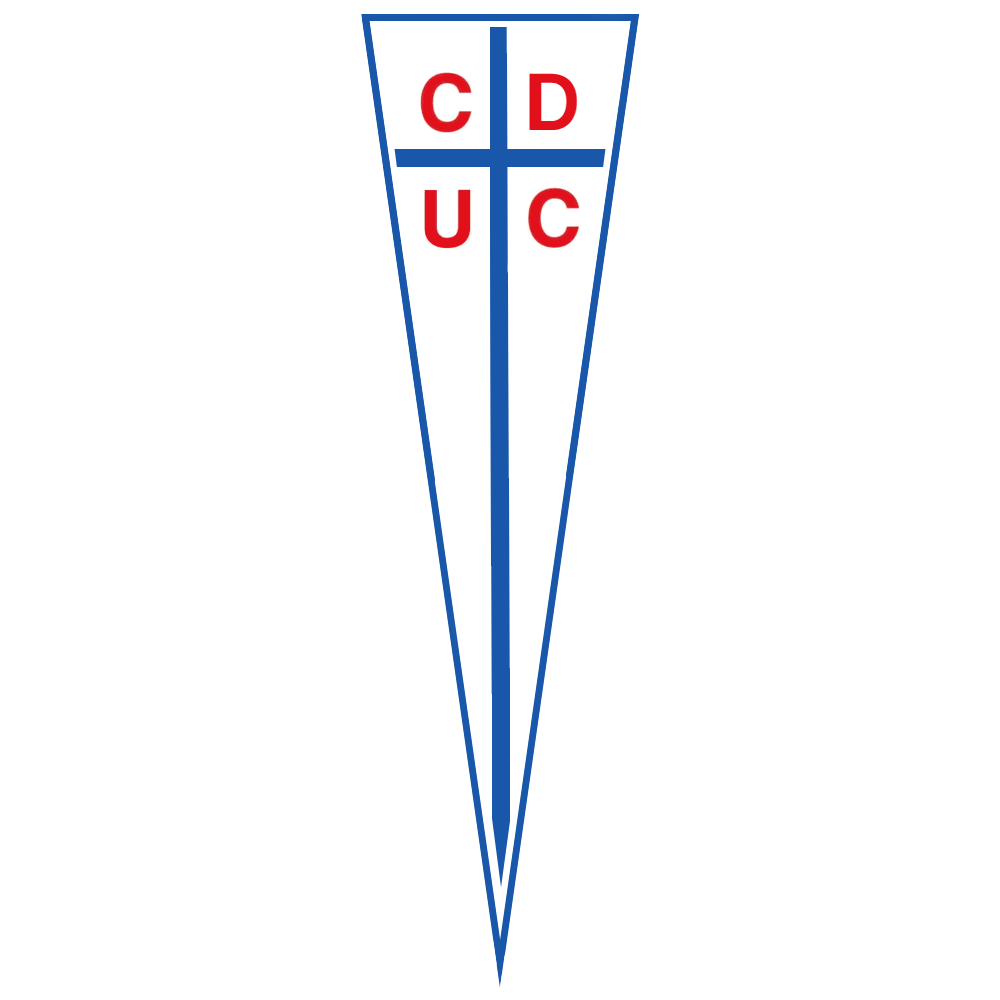
Universidad Católica
7th title

=== Results ===
Home \ Away	DAN	AUD	CLO	COL	DCO	COQ	HUA	DLS	POS	PAL	DPM	DTE	UCA	UCH	UES	SWA
Antofagasta			3–2	0–1	0–1		1–2		1–0			1–3				1–3
Audax	4–3					1–2		1–1		1–1			2–2	2–2	2–3	
Cobreloa		2–1		2–2			1–2	4–3	1–1			3–1	0–1	1–1		
Colo-Colo		1–0				2–1		1–0		2–0			1–1		4–1	
Concepción		2–1	3–1	1–2			0–0		1–0			2–1				3–3
Coquimbo	2–0		0–1		3–0		2–4		1–1		7–3	2–1				1–3
Huachipato	1–1			1–2				1–1	1–1	3–0		3–0	1–4	0–1		
La Serena	1–0				1–1	3–1				4–1				2–3	2–1	3–0
Osorno	1–1	0–1		2–3	2–1			2–1			1–1		1–1			1–1
Palestino	1–1		2–1		0–0	3–1			2–1		0–3				1–0	1–1
P. Montt		0–1	1–2	1–3			1–1	1–0				1–4	2–3			
Temuco		2–1		0–1				6–1	0–1		2–0		0–1	1–1	4–0	
U. Católica	2–1				7–2	2–1		2–0		3–0				1–0	4–0	
U. Chile	4–1			1–1	5–0	1–1			1–1	1–0	2–1				4–0	4–2
U. Española	4–0		0–4		0–4	1–3	1–0		2–0	1–1						1–2
S. Wanderers		2–2	1–1	1–1			1–0				2–2	0–1	2–2			

Legend: Blue = home team win; Yellow = draw; Red = away team win.

=== Championship play-off ===
July 8, 1997

Colo-Colo	1 – 0	Universidad Católica
Basay 87'

Estadio Monumental David Arellano, Santiago
Attendance: 22,022
Referee: M. Sanchez

July 10, 1997

Universidad Católica	3 – 0	Colo-Colo
Acosta 2'; Bisconti 23'; Lunari 78'

Estadio Nacional, Santiago
Attendance: 38,750
Referee: M. Peña

=== Top scorers ===
Pos	Name	Team	Goals
1	(Argentina) David Bisconti	Universidad Católica	15
2	(Argentina) Walter Otta	Deportes Puerto Montt	11
3	(Argentina) Alberto Acosta	Universidad Católica	10
4	(Argentina) Sergio Gioino	Provincial Osorno	9
4	(Chile) Rodrigo Barrera	Universidad de Chile	9
6	(Chile) Pedro González	Cobreloa	8
7	(Paraguay) Richart Báez	Universidad de Chile	7
7	(Chile) Juan Carlos Madrid	Coquimbo Unido	7
9	(Chile) Ivo Basay	Colo-Colo	6
9	(Chile) Fernando Vergara	Colo-Colo	6
9	(Chile) Jorge Contreras	Santiago Wanderers	6
9	(Chile) Juan Castillo	Deportes Temuco	6

== Torneo de Clausura ==
=== Table ===
Pos	Team	Pld	W	D	L	GF	GA	GD	Pts
1	Colo-Colo	15	11	2	2	33	19	+14	35
2	Universidad Católica	15	9	3	3	25	15	+10	30
3	Audax Italiano	15	9	2	4	31	16	+15	29
4	Universidad de Chile	15	7	5	3	36	17	+19	26
5	Cobreloa	15	7	4	4	28	17	+11	25
6	Deportes Puerto Montt	15	6	4	5	21	20	+1	22
7	Provincial Osorno	15	5	6	4	19	15	+4	21
8	Coquimbo Unido	15	5	6	4	15	13	+2	21
9	Deportes La Serena	15	5	4	6	21	20	+1	19
10	Palestino	15	5	2	8	13	21	−8	17
11	Deportes Antofagasta	15	5	2	8	15	27	−12	17
12	Huachipato	15	4	4	7	13	22	−9	16
13	Unión Española	15	4	3	8	22	27	−5	15
14	Deportes Temuco	15	4	3	8	18	31	−13	15
15	Santiago Wanderers	15	2	5	8	13	26	−13	11
16	Deportes Concepción	15	2	5	8	15	32	−17	11

=== Results ===
Home \ Away	DAN	AUD	CLO	COL	DCO	COQ	HUA	DLS	POS	PAL	DPM	DTE	UCA	UCH	UES	SWA
Antofagasta		0–0				1–0		2–1	0–2	2–1			1–3	1–7	2–0	
Audax			4–2	1–2	6–0		4–0		1–0		2–1	2–1				1–0
Cobreloa	5–0				4–0	1–0				3–0	2–1				1–1	2–2
Colo-Colo	2–1		2–1		3–0		3–2		2–0		3–1	4–0		1–1		4–1
Concepción	0–0					0–0		1–1	2–2	2–0			1–2	0–5	2–2	
Coquimbo		1–1		1–1				1–0		0–1			2–3	1–0	2–1	
Huachipato	0–2		0–1		2–1	1–3					1–1				0–0	0–0
La Serena		3–1	0–1	4–1			0–0		1–0		1–1	3–0	1–0			
Osorno			2–1			0–0	4–0			0–0		0–0		1–1	4–3	
Palestino		2–1		0–1			1–3	2–0				0–1	1–1	2–4		
P. Montt	2–1				1–0	1–0			3–2	2–0				0–0	2–0	4–1
Temuco	3–2		1–1		1–4	1–1	0–1				4–1					2–0
U. Católica		0–4	1–1	4–1			2–1		1–2		2–0	2–0				2–0
U. Chile		1–2	3–2				0–2	3–0				8–3	0–0			
U. Española		3–1		2–3				5–4		0–1		2–1	0–2	0–2		
S. Wanderers	1–0				3–2	1–2		2–2	0–0	1–2				1–1	0–2	

Legend: Blue = home team win; Yellow = draw; Red = away team win.

=== Top Scorers ===
Pos	Name	Team	Goals
1	(Paraguay) Richard Báez	Universidad de Chile	10
1	(Chile) Rubén Vallejos	Deportes Puerto Montt	10
3	(Paraguay) Hugo Brizuela	Audax Italiano	9
4	(Argentina) Marcos Lencina	Provincial Osorno	7
4	(Argentina) Mauricio Giganti	Unión Española	7
4	(Argentina) David Bisconti	Universidad Católica	7
4	(Chile) Rodrigo Barrera	Universidad de Chile	7
7	(Paraguay) Carlos Guirland	Audax Italiano	6
7	(Chile) Ivo Basay	Colo-Colo	6
7	(Chile) Héctor Tapia	Colo-Colo	6
7	(Chile) José Luis Sierra	Colo-Colo	6
7	(Chile) Juan Castillo	Deportes Temuco	6
12	(Chile) Mauricio Illesca	Audax Italiano	5
12	(Argentina) Gonzalo Belloso	Cobreloa	5
12	(Chile) Manuel Neira	Colo-Colo	5
12	(Chile) Juan Carreño	Deportes Concepción	5
12	(Chile) Marcelo Corrales	Palestino	5
12	(Chile) Esteban Valencia	Universidad de Chile	5
