= Víctor González (footballer, born 1977) =

Chilean footballer

Personal information
- Full name: Víctor Alejandro González Cortés
- Date of birth: 29 October 1977 (age 49)
- Place of birth: San Felipe, Chile
- Height: 1.76 m (5 ft 9 in)
- Position: Forward

Team information
- Current team: Cobreloa (assistant)

Youth career
- Unión San Felipe

Senior career*
| Years | Team | Apps | (Gls) |
| 1995–2001 | Unión San Felipe | | (42) |
| 2002 | Everton | | |
| 2003 | Cobresal | 19 | (3) |
| 2003 | Melgar | | (1) |
| 2004 | Everton | 15 | (4) |
| 2005–2006 | Deportes Melipilla | 27 | (2) |
| 2007–2008 | San Luis | 31 | (13) |
| 2008 | Curicó Unido | 19 | (6) |
| 2009 | San Marcos | 29 | (3) |
| 2010 | Deportes Iquique | 21 | (2) |
| 2011 | Lota Schwager | 33 | (5) |
| 2012 | Everton | 6 | (0) |
| 2012 | Trasandino | – | (–) |
| 2013 | Lota Schwager | 9 | (1) |
| 2013–2014 | Deportes Linares | 5 | (1) |

Managerial career
- 2016–2017: Lota Schwager
- 2024–: Cobreloa (assistant)
- * Club domestic league appearances and goals

Víctor Alejandro González Cortés (born 29 October 1977) is a Chilean football manager and former footballer who played as a forward for clubs in Chile and Peru. He is the current assistant coach in Cobreloa.

== Playing career ==
Born in San Felipe, Chile, González played for his hometown club, Unión San Felipe, until 2001, scoring forty two goals in total. With an extensive career in his homeland, he also played for Cobresal, Everton, and Deportes Melipilla in the Primera División.

In the second level, he played for Everton, Deportes Melipilla, San Luis, Curicó Unido, San Marcos, Deportes Iquique and Lota Schwager.

He also played for Trasandino in the Tercera División and Deportes Linares in the Segunda División Profesional, his last club.

He won Primera B titles with Unión San Felipe in 2000, Curicó Unido in 2008 and Deportes Iquique in 2010. In addition, he won the 2010 Copa Chile Bicentenario as a member of Deportes Iquique.

Abroad, he had a stint with Peruvian club Melgar in the 2003 Torneo Clausura, scoring a goal against Deportivo Wanka on the ninth matchday.

In January 2012, he represented Chile II in the Torneo FIFPro América, a tournament for free agents, winning the title against Brazil.

== Coaching career ==
As a football manager, he led Lota Schwager in the Segunda División Profesional with Rocío Yáñez as assistant coach.

He has also led amateur clubs in his hometown like Club Deportivo Alberto Pentzke.

In October 2024, González joined the technical staff of César Bravo in Cobreloa as the assistant coach.

== Personal life ==
He is nicknamed Guagua (Baby).
