= 1959 Campeonato Nacional Primera División =

Campeonato Nacional de Fútbol Profesional
- Dates: 18 April 1959 – 11 November 1959
- Champions: Universidad de Chile (2nd title)
- Relegated: Deportes La Serena
- Copa de Campeones: Universidad de Chile
- Matches: 183
- Goals: 620 (3.39 per match)
- Top goalscorer: José Ríos (22 goals)
- Biggest home win: Santiago Wanderers 7–1 Palestino (19 April)
- Highest attendance: 46,495 Universidad de Chile 4–3 Universidad Católica (24 October)
- Total attendance: 1,297,806
- Average attendance: 7,091

The 1959 Campeonato Nacional de Fútbol Profesional, was the 27th season of top-flight football in Chile. Universidad de Chile won their second title following a 2–1 win against Colo-Colo in the championship play-off on 11 November 1959, also qualifying to the 1960 Copa de Campeones.

== League table ==
Pos	Team	Pld	W	D	L	GF	GA	GD	Pts	Qualification or relegation
1	Universidad de Chile	26	16	6	4	61	34	+27	38	Qualified to the Championship play-off
2	Colo-Colo	26	16	6	4	57	32	+25	38	Qualified to the Championship play-off
3	Santiago Wanderers	26	13	8	5	46	33	+13	34	
4	O'Higgins	26	13	8	5	51	42	+9	34	
5	Ferrobádminton	26	9	9	8	42	40	+2	27	
6	Unión Española	26	9	8	9	32	38	−6	26	
7	Magallanes	26	11	1	14	42	49	−7	23	
8	Universidad Católica	26	9	5	12	45	53	−8	23	
9	Everton	26	8	6	12	44	42	+2	22	
10	San Luis	26	8	6	12	39	50	−11	22	
11	Rangers	26	6	9	11	36	47	−11	21	
12	Audax Italiano	26	7	6	13	33	41	−8	20	
13	Palestino	26	9	1	16	48	55	−7	19	
14	Deportes La Serena	26	6	5	15	41	61	−20	17	Relegated to 1960 Segunda División de Chile

== Results ==
Home \ Away	AUD	COL	EVE	FEB	DLS	MAG	OHI	PAL	RAN	SLU	UES	UCA	UCH	SWA
Audax		0–0	1–1	2–1	0–1	1–3	3–4	2–3	1–2	0–1	0–0	0–1	0–4	3–0
Colo-Colo	2–0		2–1	2–1	3–3	1–0	4–1	2–1	2–0	2–1	2–0	1–0	2–2	3–0
Everton	1–3	1–2		0–1	5–0	4–1	3–1	4–1	2–1	3–0	1–2	1–2	1–1	0–0
Ferrobádminton	1–1	1–4	3–1		3–1	1–2	1–1	2–3	2–0	2–2	2–2	2–1	0–3	0–0
La Serena	1–2	1–4	1–1	1–4		4–0	2–2	0–4	1–2	3–2	2–3	1–2	0–2	2–5
Magallanes	0–1	3–1	3–4	1–3	1–4		3–4	1–0	1–1	1–0	1–0	5–1	1–3	2–4
O'Higgins	0–0	4–4	1–0	2–2	2–2	4–1		3–1	4–2	2–0	3–0	1–3	2–0	2–1
Palestino	1–3	0–1	4–0	1–3	2–3	0–2	0–2		3–2	4–1	2–1	1–2	2–4	0–1
Rangers	4–3	2–2	2–2	2–0	1–1	2–0	1–1	1–6		1–2	1–1	0–1	1–3	2–2
San Luis	2–0	0–5	4–3	1–1	4–1	2–1	1–2	4–6	0–0		1–1	1–1	1–0	1–2
U. Española	1–2	1–1	2–1	4–2	3–1	0–3	1–1	1–0	2–1	0–1		2–2	1–0	1–1
U. Católica	5–4	4–2	1–2	1–2	1–4	1–3	0–1	1–1	1–2	3–2	0–2		3–3	3–3
U. de Chile	1–1	3–2	2–2	1–1	2–1	0–1	4–1	2–1	3–2	5–4	5–0	4–3		2–0
S. Wanderers	1–0	2–1	1–0	1–1	1–0	3–2	3–0	7–1	1–1	1–1	2–1	3–2	1–2	

Legend: Blue = home team win; Yellow = draw; Red = away team win.

== Championship play-off ==
11 November 1959

Colo-Colo	1 – 2	Universidad de Chile
Soto 70'		39' Álvarez; 50' Sánchez

Estadio Nacional, Santiago
Attendance: 40,744
Referee: J. Praddaude

Primera División de Chile
1959 champion
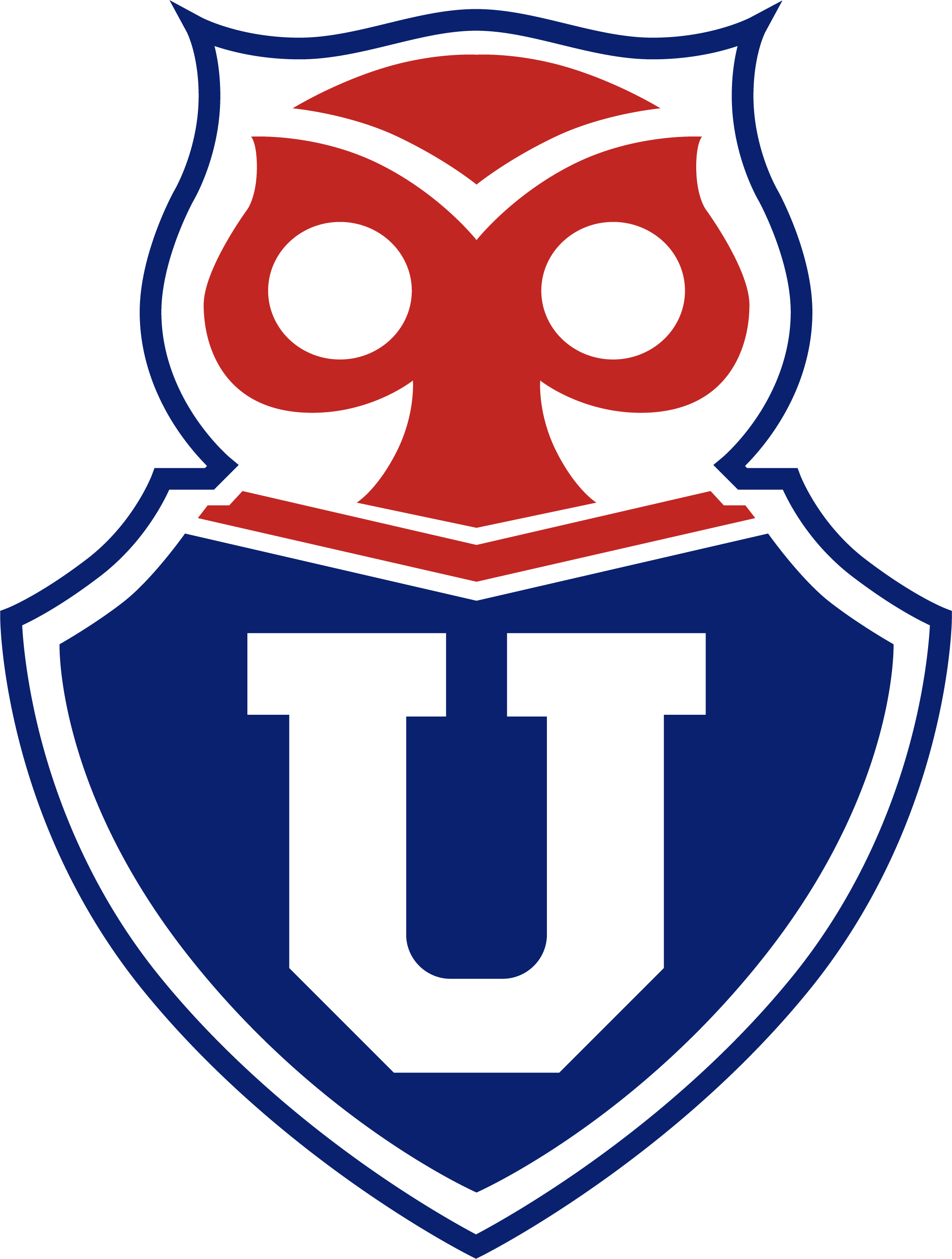
Universidad de Chile
2nd title

== Topscorer ==
Name	Team	Goals
(Chile) José Ríos	O'Higgins	22

== See also ==
- 1959 Copa Chile
