= Cristián Gómez =

Chilean footballer (born 1978)

Personal information
- Full name: Cristián Alejandro Gómez Chandía
- Date of birth: January 4, 1978 (age 48)
- Place of birth: Coquimbo, Chile
- Height: 1.77 m (5 ft 10 in)
- Position: Defender

Team information
- Current team: República Independiente (manager)

Youth career
- Coquimbo Unido

Senior career*
Years	Team	Apps	(Gls)
1997–2001	Coquimbo Unido	43	(6)
2002	Cobreloa	30	(2)
2003	Colo-Colo	10	(0)
2004	Universidad de Concepción	19	(2)
2005	Cobreloa	27	(0)
2006	Everton	29	(0)
2007	Ñublense	31	(0)
2008–2009	Rangers	63	(3)
2010	Curicó Unido	29	(1)
2011	Brantford Galaxy	7	(1)
2012	Provincial Osorno	10	(0)
2012–2013	Curicó Unido	20	(0)
2013–2017	Lota Schwager	52	(1)
Total		370	(16)

International career
2001	Chile	1	(0)
2001	Chile B	1	(0)

Managerial career
- 2019–2021: Lota Schwager
- 2022–: República Independiente
- * Club domestic league appearances and goals

Cristián Alejandro Gómez Chandía (born 4 January 1978) is a Chilean footballer who played in the Primera División of Chile, Canadian Soccer League, Segunda División de Chile and the Primera B de Chile.

== Playing career ==
Gómez played for several teams during his career, starting with local Coquimbo Unido. During his time in the Primera División of Chile he would play with C.D. Cobreloa, Colo-Colo, C.D. Universidad de Concepción, Everton de Viña del Mar, Ñublense, Rangers de Talca. In 2010, he played with Curicó Unido of the Primera B de Chile. The following year he went abroad to Canada to play with Brantford Galaxy of the Canadian Soccer League. At the conclusion the CSL season he returned to Chile to play with Provincial Osorno of the Segunda División de Chile. He would conclude his professional career with Curicó Unido, and Lota Schwager in the Primera B.

He gained one cap for Chile, on 14 November 2001, playing 65 minutes against Ecuador for the 2002 FIFA World Cup qualifiers. In addition, he made an appearance for Chile B in the friendly match against Catalonia on 28 December 2001.

== Coaching career ==
From 2019 to 2021 he was the manager of Lota Schwager in both the Tercera A and the Tercera B. Since May 2022, he works as the manager of República Independiente from Hualqui in the Tercera B.
