= Juan Carlos Gangas =

Chilean footballer and manager (born 1944)

Personal information
- Full name: Juan Abel Ganga Lubones
- Date of birth: 19 September 1944
- Place of birth: Santiago, Chile
- Position: Winger

Youth career
- Juventud Sanitas
- Atlético Santa Ana
- Universidad de Chile

Senior career*
Years	Team	Apps	(Gls)
1964–1967	Universidad de Chile		
1968–1970	Colo-Colo		
1971–1972	Antofagasta Portuario		
1973	Jorge Wilstermann		
1974	Bolívar		
1976	Regional Antofagasta		
1977	Ñublense		

Managerial career
- 1978: Ñublense
- 1980–1984: Cobreloa (assistant)
- 1985: Provincial Osorno
- 1986–1987: Lota Schwager
- 1988: O'Higgins
- 1990: Huachipato
- 2006: Deportes Temuco
- Audax Italiano (youth)
- * Club domestic league appearances and goals

Juan Abel Ganga Lubones (born September 19, 1944), sportingly known as Juan Carlos Gangas, is a Chilean former footballer who played as a winger for clubs of Chile and Bolivia.

== Teams ==
=== Player ===
- Universidad de Chile 1964–1967
- Colo-Colo 1968–1970
- Antofagasta Portuario 1971–1972
- Jorge Wilstermann 1973
- Bolívar 1974–1975
- Regional Antofagasta 1976
- Ñublense 1977

=== Manager ===
- Ñublense 1978
- Cobreloa (assistant) 1980–1984
- Provincial Osorno 1985
- Lota Schwager 1986–1987
- O'Higgins 1988
- Huachipato 1990
- Deportes Temuco 2006
- Audax Italiano (youth)

== Honours ==
=== Player ===
Universidad de Chile

- Chilean Primera División: 1964, 1965, 1967

Colo-Colo

- Chilean Primera División: 1970

Jorge Wilstermann

- Bolivian Primera División: 1973
- Asociación de Fútbol Cochabamba-Primera A: 1973

=== Manager ===
Lota Schwager

- Chilean Segunda División: 1986
