= Juan Pablo Gómez =

Argentine footballer

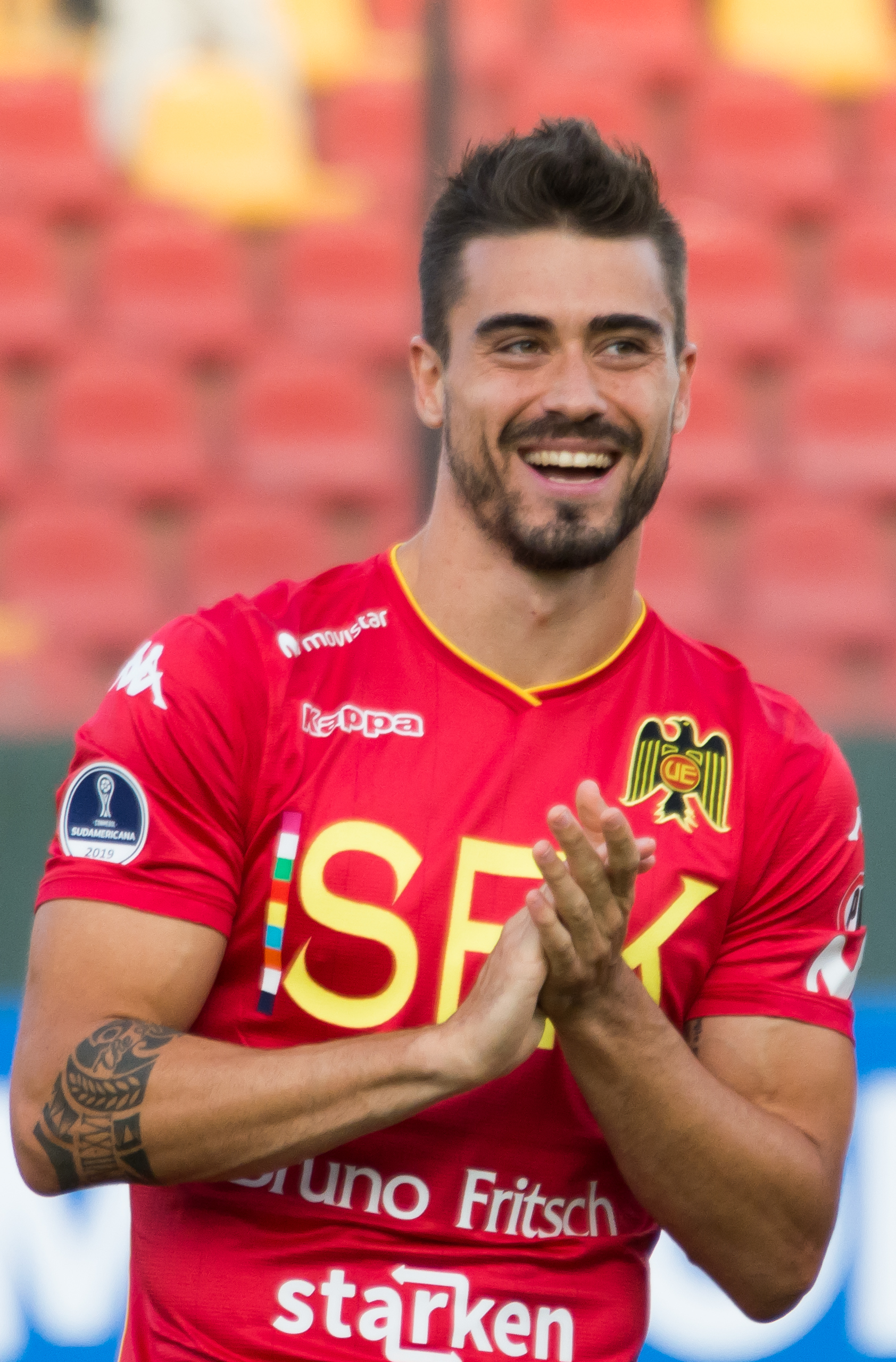
- Gómez with Unión Española in 2018

Personal information
- Full name: Juan Pablo Gómez Vidal
- Date of birth: 11 May 1991 (age 35)
- Place of birth: Buenos Aires, Argentina
- Height: 1.79 m (5 ft 10 1/2 in)
- Positions: Right-back; midfielder

Team information
- Current team: Curicó Unido
- Number: 39

Youth career
- 2007–2010: Universidad Católica

Senior career*
Years	Team	Apps	(Gls)
2010–2016	Universidad Católica	24	(1)
2012	→ Coquimbo Unido (loan)	25	(3)
2013	→ Barnechea (loan)	5	(0)
2013–2014	→ Unión La Calera (loan)	21	(1)
2015–2016	→ Universidad de Concepción (loan)	11	(0)
2016–2017	San Luis	19	(1)
2017–2021	Unión Española	111	(5)
2022	Curicó Unido	26	(1)
2023–2024	Universidad de Chile	28	(0)
2025	Deportes Iquique	6	(0)
2026–	Curicó Unido	10	(0)

International career
2010	Argentina U20		
- * Club domestic league appearances and goals as of 6 September 2026

Juan Pablo Gómez Vidal (born 11 May 1991), is an Argentine naturalized Chilean footballer who plays as a right-back for Curicó Unido.

== Club career ==
In November 2022, Gómez joined Universidad de Chile for the 2023 season. He switched to Deportes Iquique for the 2025 season.

In March 2026, Gómez returned to Curicó Unido after his stint in 2022.

== International career ==
In 2010, he took part of Argentina squad at under-20 level.

== Personal life ==
Born in Buenos Aires, Argentina, Gómez came to Chile at the age of 5 and after naturalized Chilean.

== Honours ==
Universidad Católica

- Chilean Primera División (1): 2010 season
- Copa Chile (1): 2011
