= Nicolás Fernández =

Nicolás Fernández may refer to:

== Association footballers ==
- Nico Fernández (born 1986), Argentine attacking-midfielder
- Nicolás Fernández (footballer, born 1996), Argentine centre-forward for Belgrano
- Nicolás Fernández (footballer, born 1998), Uruguayan midfielder for Fénix
- Nicolás Fernández (footballer, born June 1999), Argentine winger for Curicó Unido
- Nicolás Fernández (footballer, born August 1999), Chilean full-back for Universidad de Chile
- Nicolás Fernández (footballer, born 2000), Argentine midfielder for New York City FC
- Nicolás Fernández (footballer, born 2003), Uruguayan midfielder for Progreso

== Other people ==
- Nicolás Fernández Miranda (born 1972), Argentine rugby union scrum half
- Nicolás Fernández (politician), Argentine Justicialist Party politician
