= Marcelo Miranda =

Marcelo Miranda can refer to:

- Marcelo Miranda (footballer) (born 1967), Chilean football manager and player
- Marcelo Miranda (politician) (born 1961), Brazilian politician
