= Quitral =

Quitral is a surname. Notable people with the surname include:

- Rayén Quitral (1916–1979), Chilean soprano of Mapuche-Picunche origin
- René Quitral (1920–1982), Chilean football goalkeeper
