= Cristóbal Vergara =

Chilean footballer (born 1994)

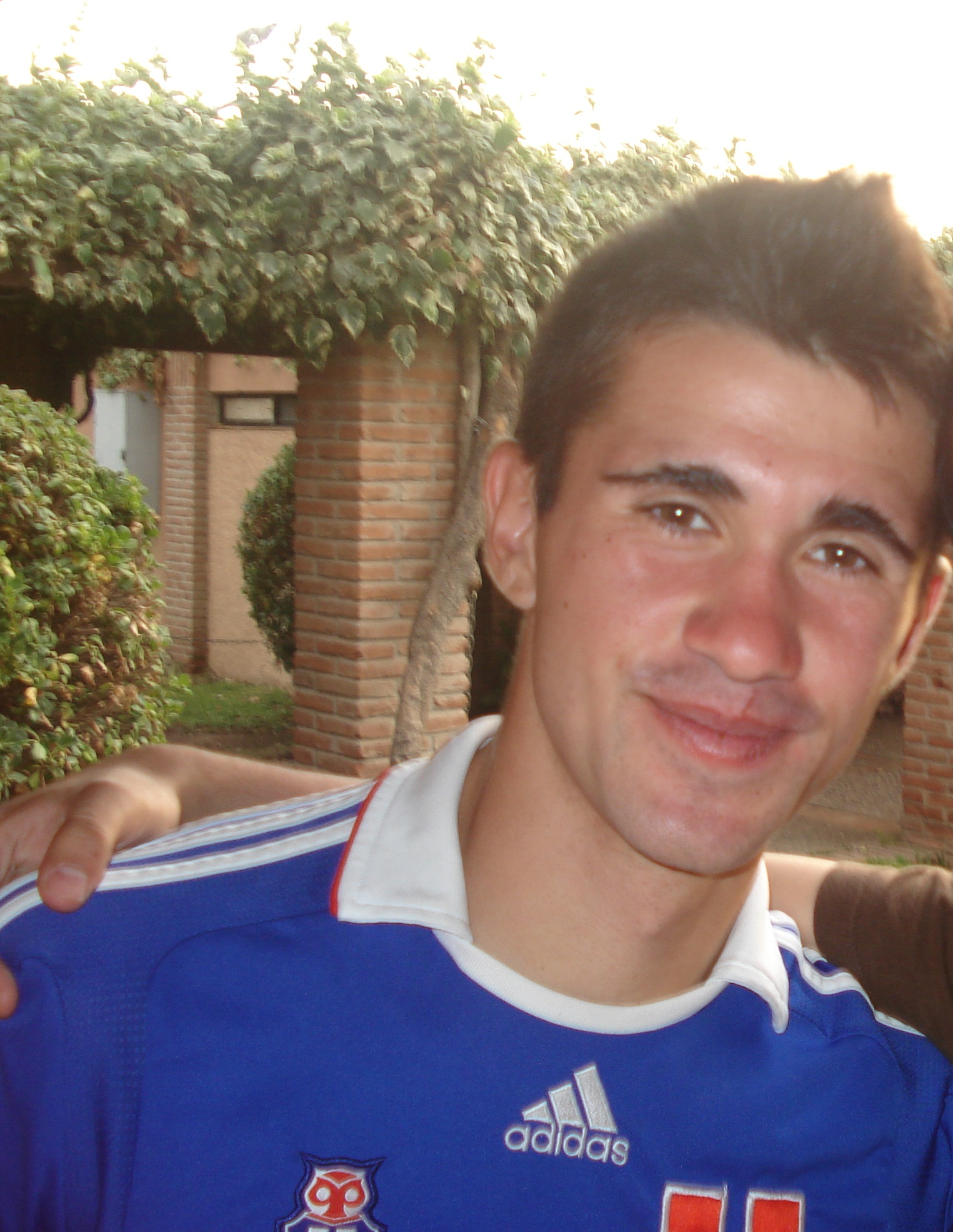
- Vergara with Universidad de Chile in 2012

Personal information
- Full name: Cristóbal Alberto Vergara Maldonado
- Date of birth: 20 June 1994 (age 32)
- Place of birth: Temuco, Chile
- Height: 1.77 m (5 ft 10 in)
- Position: Defender

Team information
- Current team: Lota Schwager
- Number: 19

Youth career
- 2004–2013: Universidad de Chile

Senior career*
Years	Team	Apps	(Gls)
2011–2015	Universidad de Chile	1	(0)
2013–2015	→ Barnechea (loan)	50	(0)
2015–2020	Deportes Temuco	76	(0)
2021–2022	Deportes Santa Cruz	54	(1)
2023–2024	Deportes Melipilla	50	(6)
2025	San Luis	14	(0)
2026–	Lota Schwager	0	(0)

International career
2010–2011	Chile U17	9	(0)
- * Club domestic league appearances and goals as of 21 January 2026

Cristóbal Alberto Vergara Maldonado (Spanish pronunciation: [kɾisˈtoβal βeɾˈɣaɾa], born 20 June 1994) is a Chilean footballer who plays as a defender for Lota Schwager.

== Club career ==
In 2025, Vergara signed with San Luis de Quillota from Deportes Melipilla.

In March 2026, Vergara joined Lota Schwager in the Segunda División Profesional de Chile.

== International career ==
Vergara represented Chile U17 at the 2010 South American Games.

== Personal life ==
He is the son of the former footballer Álvaro Vergara, who played for Universidad de Chile in the 1980s.

== Honours ==
=== Club ===
- Primera División de Chile (2): 2011 Clausura, 2012 Apertura
- Copa Sudamericana (1): 2011
