= Cristopher Barrera =

Chilean footballer (born 1998)

Personal information
- Full name: Cristopher Jesús Barrera Vergara
- Date of birth: 18 April 1998 (age 28)
- Place of birth: Renca, Santiago, Chile
- Height: 1.80 m (5 ft 11 in)
- Position: Right-back

Team information
- Current team: Everton

Youth career
- Deportes Melipilla

Senior career*
Years	Team	Apps	(Gls)
2018–2021	Deportes Melipilla	63	(0)
2022–2024	Coquimbo Unido	32	(3)
2023	→ Curicó Unido (loan)	5	(0)
2025	Cobresal	22	(2)
2026–	Everton	0	(0)
- * Club domestic league appearances and goals as of 4 January 2026

Cristopher Jesús Barrera Vergara (born 18 April 1998) is a Chilean professional footballer who plays as a right-back for Chilean Primera División side Everton de Viña del Mar.

== Career ==
A product of Deportes Melipilla youth system, he made his professional debut in the win against Deportes Puerto Montt for the 2019 Primera B de Chile. Along with Melipilla, he got the promotion to the Chilean Primera División for the 2021 season. For the 2022 season, he joined Coquimbo Unido in the Chilean Primera División.

He joined curicó Unido for the 2023 season, returning to Coquimbo Unido in the second half of the year.

Barrera joined Cobresal for the 2025 season. The next season, he switched to Everton de Viña del Mar.

== Personal life ==
Barrera is nicknamed El Gringo.
