= Daniel Monardes =

Chilean footballer

Personal information
- Full name: Daniel Alejandro Monardes Zelada
- Date of birth: 11 March 2000 (age 26)
- Place of birth: Arica, Chile
- Height: 1.80 m (5 ft 11 in)
- Position: Midfielder

Team information
- Current team: San Luis

Youth career
- San Marcos
- Deportes La Serena

Senior career*
Years	Team	Apps	(Gls)
2019–2024	Deportes La Serena	33	(1)
2022–2023	→ San Marcos (loan)	27	(0)
2025	Provincial Ovalle	19	(5)
2026–	San Luis	0	(0)
- * Club domestic league appearances and goals as of 25 December 2025

Daniel Alejandro Monardes Zelada (born 11 March 2000) is a Chilean footballer who plays as a midfielder for San Luis de Quillota.

== Club career ==
Born in Arica, Chile, Monardes was trained at San Marcos de Arica and Deportes La Serena. He was promoted to the Deportes La Serena first team in the 2019 season and made his debut the same year. He got regularity in the Chilean Primera División during 2020 and 2021. In March 2022, he was loaned out to San Marcos de Arica, winning the 2022 Segunda División Profesional, and returned to La Serena for the 2024 season, winning the 2024 Primera B de Chile.

On 2 March 2025, Monardes joined Provincial Ovalle in the Segunda División Profesional de Chile.

In December 2025, Monardes signed with San Luis de Quillota.
