= Cristofer Salas =

Chilean footballer (born 2000)

Personal information
- Full name: Cristofer Andrés Salas Barriga
- Date of birth: May 23, 2000 (age 26)
- Place of birth: Concepción, Chile
- Height: 1.76 m (5 ft 9 in)
- Position: Forward

Team information
- Current team: Lota Schwager
- Number: 18

Youth career
- 2016–2017: Naval
- 2017: → Universidad Católica (loan)

Senior career*
Years	Team	Apps	(Gls)
2017–2019	Naval	–	(–)
2017	→ Universidad Católica (loan)	0	(0)
2019	Deportes Concepción	–	(–)
2020–2021	Coquimbo Unido	11	(1)
2021–2025	Deportes Antofagasta	35	(3)
2022	→ Deportes Concepción (loan)	11	(1)
2026–	Lota Schwager	0	(0)
- * Club domestic league appearances and goals as of 30 March 2026

Cristofer Andrés Salas Barriga (born May 23, 2000) is a Chilean footballer who plays as a forward for Lota Schwager.

== Career ==
A product of Naval, Salas was loaned out to the Universidad Católica under-21 team in 2017.

After playing for club Deportes Concepción at the Tercera A, the fourth level of Chilean football, and getting promotion to Segunda División, on 2020 season he joined to Chilean Primera División club Coquimbo Unido. Along with Coquimbo Unido, he played at the 2020 Copa Sudamericana.

In 2021, he moved to Deportes Antofagasta on a deal for four years. He left them at the end of the 2025 season.

In 2026, Salas joined Lota Schwager in the Segunda División Profesional de Chile.
