= Cristopher Medina =

Chilean footballer

Personal information
- Full name: Cristopher Alejandro Medina García
- Date of birth: 13 February 2001 (age 25)
- Place of birth: Valparaíso, Chile
- Height: 1.72 m (5 ft 8 in)
- Position: Right-back

Team information
- Current team: Curicó Unido (on loan from Ñublense)
- Number: 14

Youth career
- 2012–2019: Everton

Senior career*
Years	Team	Apps	(Gls)
2020–2023	Everton	57	(0)
2020–2021	→ Unión La Calera (loan)	3	(0)
2024–	Ñublense	14	(0)
2025	→ Universidad de Concepción (loan)	29	(1)
2026–	→ Curicó Unido (loan)	0	(0)
- * Club domestic league appearances and goals as of 9 November 2025

Cristopher Alejandro Medina García (born 13 February 2001) is a Chilean footballer who plays as a right-back for Curicó Unido on loan from Ñublense.

== Club career ==
Born in Valparaíso, Chile, Medina joined the Everton de Viña del Mar youth ranks at the age of 11. In August 2020, he was loaned out to Unión La Calera in the Chilean Primera División and made his professional debut with them. Back to Everton in 2021, he made appearances in both the 2022 Copa Libertadores and the 2022 Copa Sudamericana.

In January 2024, Medina joined Ñublense in the Chilean top Division. The next season, he was loaned out to Universidad de Concepción, winning the 2025 Primera B de Chile. He switched to Curicó Unido for the 2026 season.

== International career ==
Medina took part in training microcycles of Chile at under-20 under Héctor Robles and Patricio Ormazábal.

== Honours ==
Universidad de Concepción

- Primera B de Chile: 2025
