= Vicente Durán =

Chilean footballer

Personal information
- Full name: Vicente Pablo Durán Vidal
- Date of birth: 4 October 1999 (age 27)
- Place of birth: La Serena, Chile
- Height: 1.79 m (5 ft 10 in)
- Position: Left-back

Team information
- Current team: San Luis

Youth career
- Deportes La Serena

Senior career*
Years	Team	Apps	(Gls)
2018–2022	Deportes La Serena	59	(0)
2022	→ Santiago Morning (loan)	21	(2)
2023	Deportes Iquique	25	(0)
2024	Deportes La Serena	8	(0)
2025	Rangers	19	(0)
2026–	San Luis	0	(0)
- * Club domestic league appearances and goals as of 25 December 2025

Vicente Pablo Durán Vidal (born 4 October 1999) is a Chilean footballer who plays as a left-back for San Luis de Quillota.

== Club career ==
Born in La Serena, Chile, Durán was trained at local team Deportes La Serena and made his professional debut in the 2018 season. In January 2021, he renewed his contract for two years. Having got promotion to the Chilean Primera División the next season, he became a regular player during the 2020 and the 2021 season. In 2022, he was loaned out to Santiago Morning.

On 30 November 2022, Durán signed with Deportes Iquique for the 2023 season, getting promotion to the Chilean top division. The next season, he returned to Deportes La Serena, winning the 2024 Primera B de Chile.

In 2025, Durán joined Rangers de Talca. The next season, he switched to San Luis de Quillota.
