= Diego Torres (footballer, born 1992) =

Chilean footballer (born 1992)

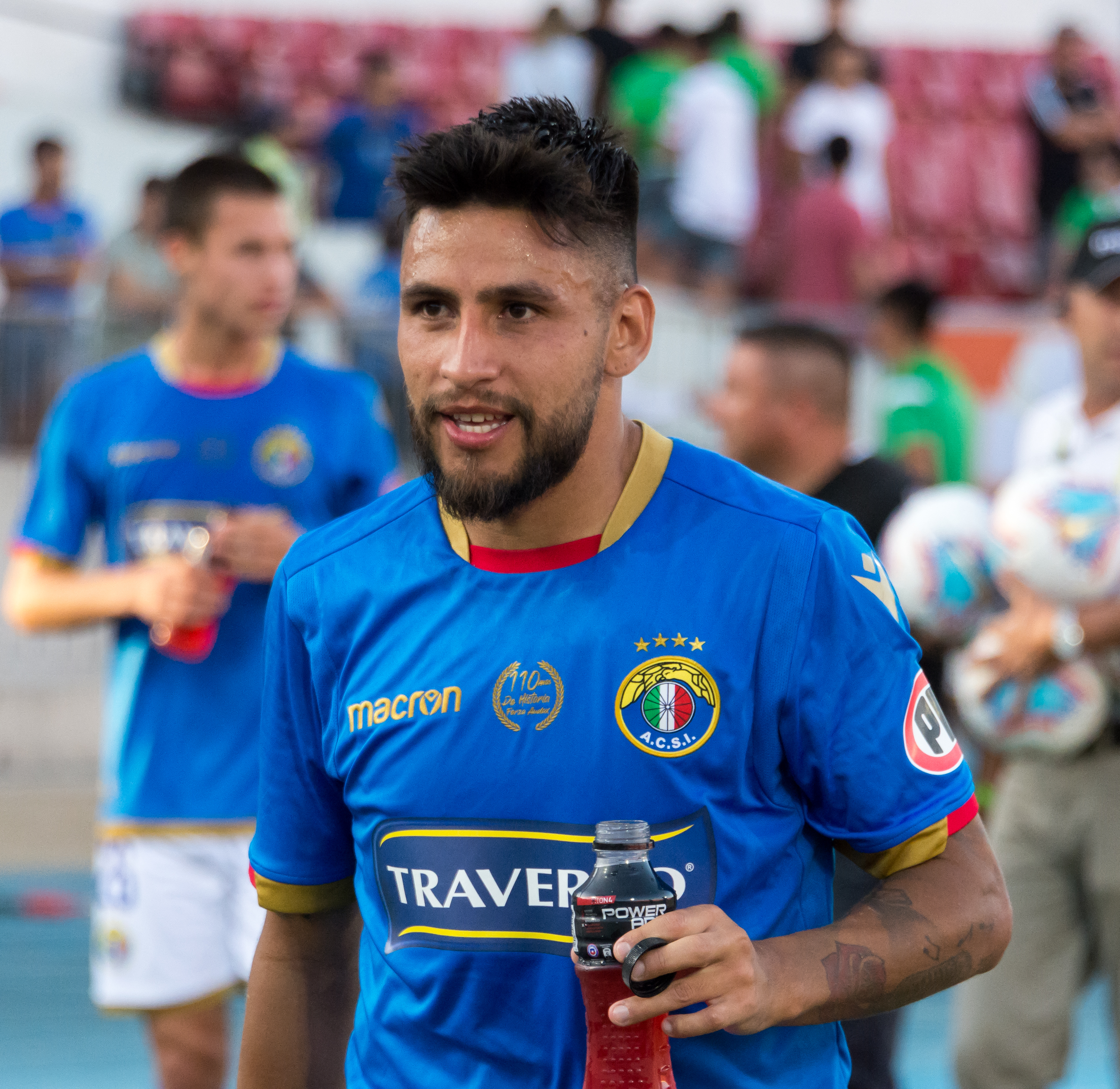
- Torres with Audax Italiano in 2020

Personal information
- Full name: Diego Ignacio Torres Quintana
- Date of birth: 31 July 1992 (age 34)
- Place of birth: Estación Central, Santiago, Chile
- Height: 1.75 m (5 ft 9 in)
- Position: Midfielder

Team information
- Current team: Lota Schwager
- Number: 6

Youth career
- Palestino

Senior career*
Years	Team	Apps	(Gls)
2012–2018	Palestino	87	(4)
2013	→ San Antonio Unido (loan)	18	(2)
2019–2022	Audax Italiano	57	(1)
2021	→ Deportes Antofagasta (loan)	23	(0)
2023	Deportes Temuco	31	(0)
2024–2025	Santiago Wanderers	34	(0)
2026–	Lota Schwager	0	(0)
- * Club domestic league appearances and goals as of 2 February 2026

Diego Ignacio Torres Quintana (born 31 July 1992) is a Chilean footballer who plays as a midfielder for Lota Schwager.

== Career ==
He made his senior debut in Primera División for Palestino on May 19, 2012, when he came on as a substitute in the second half against La Serena. In 2013, he was loaned out to San Antonio Unido in the Segunda División Profesional de Chile.

In 2019, he switched to Audax Italiano. In 2021, he was loaned out to Deportes Antofagasta.

In 2023, he joined Deportes Temuco. The next season, he switched to Santiago Wanderers.

In April 2026, Torres joined Lota Schwager in the Segunda División Profesional de Chile.

== Honours ==
Palestino

- Copa Chile (1): 2018
