= Lucas Quiroga =

Argentine footballer

Personal information
- Full name: Lucas Miguel Quiroga Pérez
- Date of birth: 8 May 2000 (age 26)
- Place of birth: San Luis, Argentina
- Height: 1.85 m (6 ft 1 in)
- Position: Forward

Team information
- Current team: Lota Schwager
- Number: 9

Youth career
- Estudiantes SL

Senior career*
Years	Team	Apps	(Gls)
2020–2023	Estudiantes SL	60	(8)
2023–2024	Acassuso	16	(1)
2024	→ Barnechea (loan)	10	(1)
2025–	Lota Schwager	1	(0)
- * Club domestic league appearances and goals as of 30 March 2026

Lucas Miguel Quiroga Pérez (born 8 May 2000) is an Argentine professional footballer who plays as a forward for Chilean club Lota Schwager.

== Club career ==
Born in San Luis, Argentina, Quiroga was trained at Estudiantes de San Luis and made his senior debut in the 1–1 draw against Sportivo Las Parejas for the Copa Argentina on 18 January 2020. He left them in June 2023.

In the second half of 2023, Quiroga signed with Acassuso. In 2024, Quiroga moved to Chile and joined on loan to Barnechea.

In February 2025, Quiroga joined Lota Schwager as a free agent, getting the promotion to the 2026 Segunda División Profesional de Chile after beating Comunal Cabrero by penalties in a playoff match on 7 March 2026.

== Personal life ==
Both his grandfather and his father, Javier, were footballers for Estudiantes de San Luis.

Quiroga holds dual Argentine-Chilean nationality. He is of Chilean descent on his maternal side and got Chilean nationality by descent in 2024.
