= Jaime Zapata (footballer) =

Chilean footballer (born 1959)

Personal information
- Full name: Jaime Sebastián Zapata Rodríguez
- Date of birth: 20 June 1959 (age 67)
- Place of birth: Talcahuano, Chile
- Position: Goalkeeper

Youth career
- Orompello
- 1977: Valparaíso (city team)
- 1977–1979: Everton

Senior career*
| Years | Team | Apps | (Gls) |
| 1979–1985 | Everton | 83 | (0) |
| 1981 | → Coquimbo Unido (loan) | | |
| 1981 | → Santiago Wanderers (loan) | | |
| 1986 | San Luis | | |
| 1986 | Audax Italiano | 16 | (0) |
| 1987 | Cobreandino | | |
| 1988–1989 | Deportes La Serena | 14 | (0) |
| 1990 | Deportes Antofagasta | | |
| 1991–1992 | Santiago Wanderers | 27 | (0) |
| 1992 | Everton | 20 | (0) |
| 1993 | Santiago Wanderers | | |
| 1995 | Unión La Calera | | |

Managerial career
- 1999: San Luis
- 2000: Al-Arabi (assistant)
- 2001: Everton
- 2004: Lota Schwager
- 2008–2019: Santiago Wanderers (youth women)
- 2008–2019: Santiago Wanderers (women)
- 2009: Valparaíso Region (women)
- 2019: Colo-Colo (women)
- * Club domestic league appearances and goals

Jaime Sebastián Zapata Rodríguez (born 20 June 1959) is a Chilean football manager and former player who played as a goalkeeper.

== Playing career ==
Born in Talcahuano, Chile, Zapata was with Club Orompello from Valparaíso as a youth player. In 1977, he took part in the 1977 Amateur Youth National Championship in Pedro de Valdivia nitrate works representing the Valparaíso city team alongside fellows such as Juan Carlos Letelier, later a Chile international, and Mauricio Hernández Norambuena, later the commander of the political-military organization Manuel Rodríguez Patriotic Front, before joining the Everton de Viña del Mar youth system.

Better known for having represented both Everton and Santiago Wanderers, classic rivals, in the first and the second divisions, he had an extensive career in his homeland. In the Primera División, he also played for Audax Italiano and Deportes La Serena. In the second level, he also played for Cobreandino, Deportes Antofagasta and Unión La Calera. In addition, he represented Coquimbo Unido and San Luis de Quillota in the Copa Polla Gol in 1981 and 1986, respectively.

With Everton, he won the 1984 Copa Polla Gol with Fernando Riera as coach.

== Coaching career ==
As coach of men's teams, Zapata has led San Luis de Quillota, Everton and Lota Schwager.

He also served as the assistant coach of Luis Santibáñez in Qatari club Al-Arabi in 2000.

As coach of women's teams, Zapata is considered the driving force of the women's football for Santiago Wanderers since 2008 and worked for over ten years at youth and senior level in the club. In 2019, he assumed as coach of Colo-Colo.

In addition, he led the women's team of the Valparaíso Region in the 2009 Binational Games.
