= Iván Cisternas =

Chilean politician

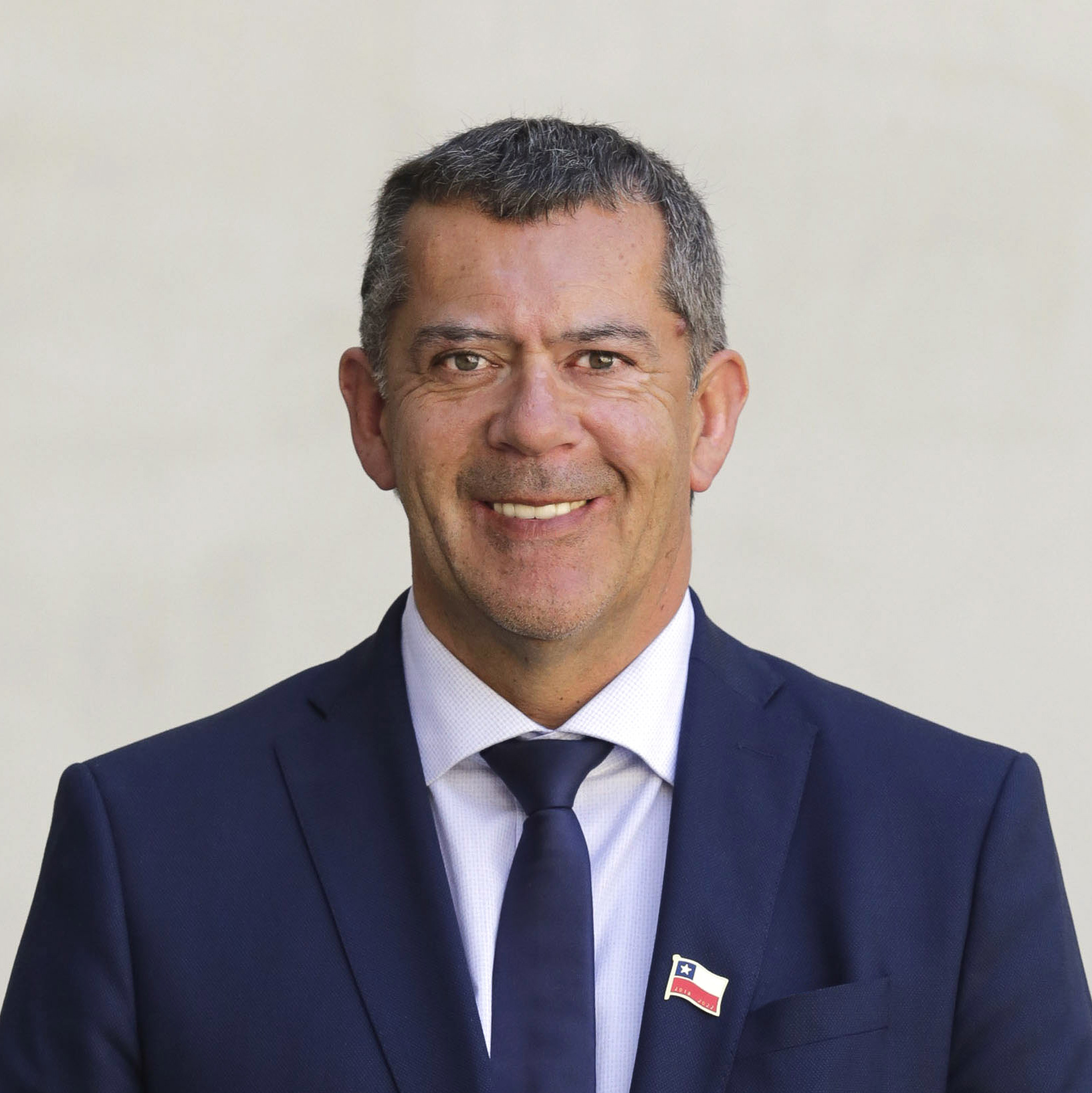

Presidential Delegate of the Quillota Province
- In office 11 March 2014 – 17 August 2015
- President: Sebastián Piñera
- Preceded by: Creation of the position

Governor of the Quillota Province
- In office 11 March 2018 – 14 July 2021
- President: Sebastián Piñera
- Preceded by: César Barra Rozas
- Succeeded by: Dissolution of the position

Governor of the Choapa Province
- In office 17 March 2010 – 12 November 2012
- President: Sebastián Piñera
- Preceded by: Gisella Mateluna
- Succeeded by: Rodolfo Zúñiga

Personal details
- Born: 1 August 1967 (age 58) Quillota, Chile
- Party: Renovación Nacional
- Education: Instituto Rafael Ariztía
- Alma mater: Pontifical Catholic University of Valparaíso (BA)
- Profession: Civil engineer

Iván Marcelo Cisternas Tapia (born 1 August 1967) is a Chilean civil engineer and politician who served as provincial governor during the two governments of Sebastián Piñera.

In 2016, he unsuccessfully run to be mayor of Quillota.

On 22 March 2012, he assumed as president of the football club San Luis Quillota.

== Political career ==
Born in Quillota, his whole education was carried out at the Instituo Rafael Ariztía (IRA) of his hometown.

He graduated as a Mechanical Engineer at the Pontificia Universidad Católica de Valparaíso. By the other hand, he graduated as a Civil Industrial Engineer from the Universidad del Mar and also obtained an MBA in Marketing and Sales at the same university.

From 1998 to 2003, he worked at the Compañía Sudamericana de Vapores.

In 2017, he was director of the Planning Secretariat of the Municipality of La Cruz.

== Electoral record ==
=== 2013 Parliamentary elections ===
For the 9th District of Combarbalá, Canela, Illapel, Los Vilos, Punitaqui, Salamanca and Monte Patria.

Candidate	Pact	Party	Votes	%	Result
Luis Lemus Aracena	Nueva Mayoría	PS	23.802	43,79	Deputy
Jorge Insunza Gregorio Las Heras	Nueva Mayoría	PPD	15.474	28,46	Deputy
Iván Cisternas Tapia	Alianza	RN	7.839	14,42	
Fernando Herman Herrera	Alianza	UDI	3.933	7,23	
Alberto Chávez Astudillo	Partido Regionalista de los Independientes	PRI	1.877	3,45	
José Salinas Pinto	Partido Humanista	PH	1.429	2,62	
