= 1986 Campeonato Nacional Segunda División =

Segunda División
- Season: 1986
- Champions: Trasandino
- Promoted: Trasandino; Arturo Fernández Vial
- Relegated: None

The 1986 Segunda División de Chile was the 35th season of the Segunda División de Chile.

Lota Schwager was the tournament's champion.

== Final table ==
=== North Zone ===
Pos	Team	Pld	W	D	L	GF	GA	GD	Pts	Qualification
1	O'Higgins	22	11	7	4	45	29	+16	31 (Note: 2 bonus points)	Qualified to Promotion Playoffs
2	Cobreandino	22	13	5	4	42	28	+14	31	Qualified to Promotion Playoffs
3	Deportes Arica	22	10	8	4	40	19	+21	28	Qualified to Promotion Playoffs
4	Coquimbo Unido	22	8	11	3	25	13	+12	28 (Note: 1 bonus point)	Qualified to Promotion Playoffs
5	Regional Atacama	22	11	6	5	34	26	+8	28	
6	Santiago Wanderers	22	8	7	7	29	26	+3	24	
7	Deportes Antofagasta	22	5	13	4	23	25	−2	23	
8	Quintero Unido	22	6	6	10	25	35	−10	18	
9	Deportes La Serena	22	4	8	10	20	25	−5	16	
10	Deportes Ovalle	22	3	9	10	23	36	−13	15	
11	Soinca Bata	22	1	11	10	18	38	−20	13	
12	Unión La Calera	22	3	7	12	19	43	−24	13	

Source: globalsportsarchive.com

=== South Zone ===
Pos	Team	Pld	W	D	L	GF	GA	GD	Pts	Qualification
1	Lota Schwager	22	12	8	2	31	14	+17	32	Qualified to Promotion Playoffs
2	Malleco Unido	22	10	8	4	29	23	+6	29 (Note: 1 bonus point)	Qualified to Promotion Playoffs
3	Curicó Unido	22	8	11	3	32	23	+9	27	
4	Deportes Valdivia	22	6	12	4	20	19	+1	24	
5	Deportes Temuco	22	9	6	7	28	30	−2	24	
6	Deportes Laja	22	7	8	7	26	25	+1	22	
7	Deportes Linares	22	5	9	8	24	27	−3	19	
8	Iberia Biobío	22	7	5	10	20	23	−3	19	
9	Unión Santa Cruz	22	5	8	9	24	33	−9	18	
10	Provincial Osorno	22	6	6	10	20	30	−10	18	
11	Deportes Puerto Montt	22	5	7	10	22	27	−5	17	
12	Ñublense	22	5	6	11	24	26	−2	16	

Source: globalsportsarchive.com

=== Promotion Playoffs ===
Pos	Team	Pld	W	D	L	GF	GA	GD	Pts	Promotion
1	Lota Schwager (C)	10	5	4	1	14	11	+3	14	Promoted to 1987 Chilean Primera División
2	Coquimbo Unido	10	4	3	3	16	11	+5	11	
3	O'Higgins	10	4	3	3	19	15	+4	11	
4	Cobreandino	10	4	2	4	24	18	+6	10	
5	Deportes Arica	10	3	3	4	18	21	−3	9	
6	Malleco Unido	10	2	1	7	13	28	−15	5	

Source: globalsportsarchive.com
(C) Champions

== See also ==
- Chilean football league system
