= Leonardo Povea =

Chilean footballer (born 1994)

Personal information
- Full name: Leonardo Nicolás Povea Pérez
- Date of birth: 26 January 1994 (age 32)
- Place of birth: Los Ángeles, Chile
- Height: 1.70 m (5 ft 7 in)
- Position: Defensive midfielder

Team information
- Current team: Lota Schwager

Youth career
- 2000–2012: Huachipato

Senior career*
Years	Team	Apps	(Gls)
2012–2019	Huachipato	115	(8)
2020–2021	Universidad de Concepción	26	(0)
2021	Deportes Antofagasta	2	(0)
2021	Deportes Iquique	12	(0)
2022	Deportes Copiapó	26	(0)
2023	Rangers	19	(1)
2024	Deportes Puerto Montt	20	(1)
2025	Deportes Valdivia	–	(–)
2026–	Lota Schwager	0	(0)
- * Club domestic league appearances and goals as of 2 February 2026

Leonardo Nicolás Povea Pérez (born 26 January 1994) is a Chilean footballer that currently plays as a defensive midfielder for Lota Schwager.

== Career ==
A product of Huachipato youth system, Povea has also played for Universidad de Concepción, Deportes Antofagasta, Deportes Iquique and Deportes Copiapó.

In March 2025, Povea signed with Deportes Valdivia in the Chilean Tercera B. The next year, he switched to Lota Schwager.

== Honours ==
=== Player ===
Huachipato

- Primera División de Chile (1): 2012 Clausura
