= Juan Castillo (footballer, born 1970) =

Chilean footballer

Personal information
- Full name: Juan Mauricio Castillo Balcázar
- Date of birth: 29 October 1970 (age 56)
- Place of birth: La Serena, Chile
- Height: 1.72 m (5 ft 8 in)
- Position: Forward

Senior career*
Years	Team	Apps	(Gls)
1988–1991	Deportes La Serena		
1990	→ San Luis (loan)		
1992–1993	Unión Española		
1993–1994	Colo-Colo		
1995	Deportes La Serena		
1996–1997	Deportes Temuco		
1998	Deportes La Serena		
1999	Deportes Iquique		
2000–2001	Coquimbo Unido		

International career
1992–1997	Chile	6	(1)
- * Club domestic league appearances and goals

Juan Mauricio Castillo Balcázar (born 29 October 1970) is a Chilean former professional footballer who played as a forward. He obtained six caps (one goal) for the Chile national side, making his debut on 31 March 1993.
