= Joel Torres =

Argentine footballer

Personal information
- Full name: Joel Maximiliano Torres
- Date of birth: October 20, 1999 (age 27)
- Place of birth: Guernica, Buenos Aires, Argentina
- Height: 1.83 m (6 ft 0 in)
- Position: Defensive midfielder

Team information
- Current team: San Luis
- Number: 5

Youth career
- Brown de Adrogué
- 2019–2020: Sacachispas

Senior career*
Years	Team	Apps	(Gls)
2020–2021	Sacachispas	0	(0)
2021–2022	Yupanqui	18	(3)
2022–2025	Liniers	150	(2)
2026–	San Luis	15	(0)
- * Club domestic league appearances and goals as of 30 June 2026

Joel Maximiliano Torres (born 20 October 1999) is an Argentine professional footballer who plays as a defensive midfielder for Chilean club San Luis de Quillota.

== Career ==
Born in Guernica, Buenos Aires, Argentina, Torres started his professional career with Sacachispas and Yupanqui.

From 2022 to 2025, Torres played for Liniers from Villegas. With them, he got promotion to the 2024 Primera B Metropolitana.

In December 2025, Torres moved to Chile thanks to his teammate in Sacachispas and Liniers, Diego Auzqui, and joined San Luis de Quillota.
