= Pancho Martínez =

Argentine football manager and player

Personal information
- Full name: José María Martínez
- Date of birth: 28 June 1967 (age 59)
- Place of birth: Chivilcoy, Argentine
- Position: Midfielder

Team information
- Current team: Tristán Suárez (manager)

Senior career*
Years	Team	Apps	(Gls)
1990–1991	Deportivo Laferrere		
1991–1992	Atlético Rafaela	34	(2)
1992–1993	Deportivo Laferrere		
1993–1994	Barcelona SC		
1994–1995	Estudiantes LP	14	(0)
1995–1996	Atlanta	16	(1)
1996–1997	Quilmes	52	(0)
1997–1998	Chacarita Juniors	6	(0)
1998–1999	Atlético Tucumán	21	(0)
1999–2002	San Martín Mendoza		
1999–2002	San Martín SJ	15	(0)
2003	San Martín Mendoza		
2003	Luján de Cuyo	14	(1)

Managerial career
- 2004: San Martín Mendoza
- 2006–2008: Quilmes (youth)
- 2006: Quilmes (interim)
- 2008: Quilmes
- 2009: 2 de Mayo
- 2010–2011: Defensa y Justicia
- 2011: Juventud Unida Universitario
- 2014: Morelia (assistant)
- 2016: Defensores de Belgrano VR
- 2017: Arsenal de Sarandí (assistant)
- 2018: Flandria
- 2018: Almagro (assistant)
- 2019: Sinaloa (assistant)
- 2019: San Luis de Quillota
- 2020–2021: San Luis de Quillota
- 2022–2023: Villa Dálmine
- 2023: Alvarado
- 2024: San Martín SJ
- 2024–: Tristán Suárez
- * Club domestic league appearances and goals

José María "Pancho" Martínez (born 28 June 1967) is an Argentine football manager and former player who played as a midfielder. He is currently in charge of Tristán Suárez.

== Playing career ==
A midfielder, Martínez developed almost all his career in his homeland. He started his career at the Liga Chivilcoyana, aged 16, and his first professional club was Deportivo Laferrere, aged 23. He later played for Atlético Rafaela, Estudiantes de La Plata, Quilmes, among other clubs.

Abroad, Martínez had a stint with Ecuadorian club Barcelona, with whom he competed at the 1994 Copa Libertadores.

His last club was Luján de Cuyo.

== Managerial career ==
Following his retirement, Martínez started his career as manager with San Martín de Mendoza in 2004. In 2006, he led Quilmes in the Argentine Primera División.

In December 2008, Martínez moved to Paraguay to led 2 de Mayo.

In 2014, Martínez joined the technical staff of Ángel Comizzo in Mexican club Morelia as an assistant coach. He also held the same charge in Arsenal de Sarandí under Humberto Grondona in 2017, Almagro under Sebastián Battaglia in 2018 and Dorados de Sinaloa under Diego Maradona in 2019.

In the second half of 2019, Martínez moved to Chile and assumed as manager of San Luis de Quillota in the Primera B. He returned to them in December 2020 until May 2021.

In 2024, Martínez was appointed as manager of Tristán Suárez.

== Personal life ==
He is nicknamed Pancho Martínez.
