= Nicolás Fernández (footballer, born June 1999) =

Argentine footballer

Personal information
- Full name: Nicolás Martín Fernández
- Date of birth: 17 June 1999 (age 27)
- Place of birth: Ramos Mejía, Argentina
- Height: 1.72 m (5 ft 8 in)
- Position: Winger

Team information
- Current team: Curicó Unido (on loan from UAI Urquiza)
- Number: 7

Youth career
- UAI Urquiza

Senior career*
Years	Team	Apps	(Gls)
2018–	UAI Urquiza	132	(15)
2025–	→ Curicó Unido (loan)	22	(4)
- * Club domestic league appearances and goals as of 1 September 2025

Nicolás Martín Fernández (born 17 June 1999) is an Argentine footballer who plays as a winger for Chilean club Curicó Unido on loan from UAI Urquiza.

== Club career ==
Born in Ramos Mejía, Argentina, Fernández is a product of UAI Urquiza and made his professional debut on 21 September 2018 in the 0–2 loss against Atlanta for the 2018–19 Primera B. In July 2023, he extend his contract until December 2025.

In January 2025, Fernández moved to Chile and joined Curicó Unido on a one-year loan with an option to buy.

== Personal life ==
He is nicknamed Chiqui, an affective form of Chico (Short) due to his height.
