= Mario Patrón =

Uruguayan football manager and player

Personal information
- Full name: Mario Adolfo Patrón Martínez
- Date of birth: 23 November 1944
- Place of birth: Florida, Uruguay
- Date of death: 20 October 1999 (aged 54)
- Position: Defender

Youth career
- 1959: Nacional

Senior career*
Years	Team	Apps	(Gls)
1960–1966	Nacional	7	(0)
1963	→ Central FC (loan)		
1964	→ Defensor (loan)		
1966	Gimnasia LP		
1967–1968	San Lorenzo		
1969	Rentistas		
1970	Fénix		

Managerial career
- 1973–1974: Atlético Florida
- 1974: Selección Florida
- 1975: Cerro
- 1975–1976: Defensor
- 1976: Lota Schwager
- 1977: Defensor
- 1978: Junior
- 1979: Huracán Buceo
- 1981: Fénix
- 1989–1990: Selección Florida
- Villa Española
- 1995: Atlético Florida
- * Club domestic league appearances and goals

Mario Adolfo Patrón Martínez (23 November 1944 – 20 October 1999) was a Uruguayan football manager and player who played as a defender.

== Playing career ==
Born in Florida, Uruguay, Patrón started his career with giant Nacional. In his homeland, he also played for Central FC, Defensor, Rentistas and Fénix.

Abroad, Patrón played in Argentina for Gimnasia y Esgrima La Plata and San Lorenzo de Almagro.

== Managerial career ==
- (Uruguay) Atlético Florida 1973–1974
- (Uruguay) Selección Florida 1974
- (Uruguay) Cerro 1975
- (Uruguay) Defensor 1975–1976
- (Chile) Lota Schwager 1976
- (Colombia) Junior 1978
- (Uruguay) Huracán Buceo 1979
- (Uruguay) Fénix 1981
- (Uruguay) Selección Florida 1989–1990
- (Uruguay) Villa Española
- (Uruguay) Atlético Florida 1995

== Personal life ==
He was the grandfather of Uruguayan football forward, Renzo López Patrón.

Patrón dead on 20 October 1999.
