= René Quitral =

Chilean footballer (1924–1982)

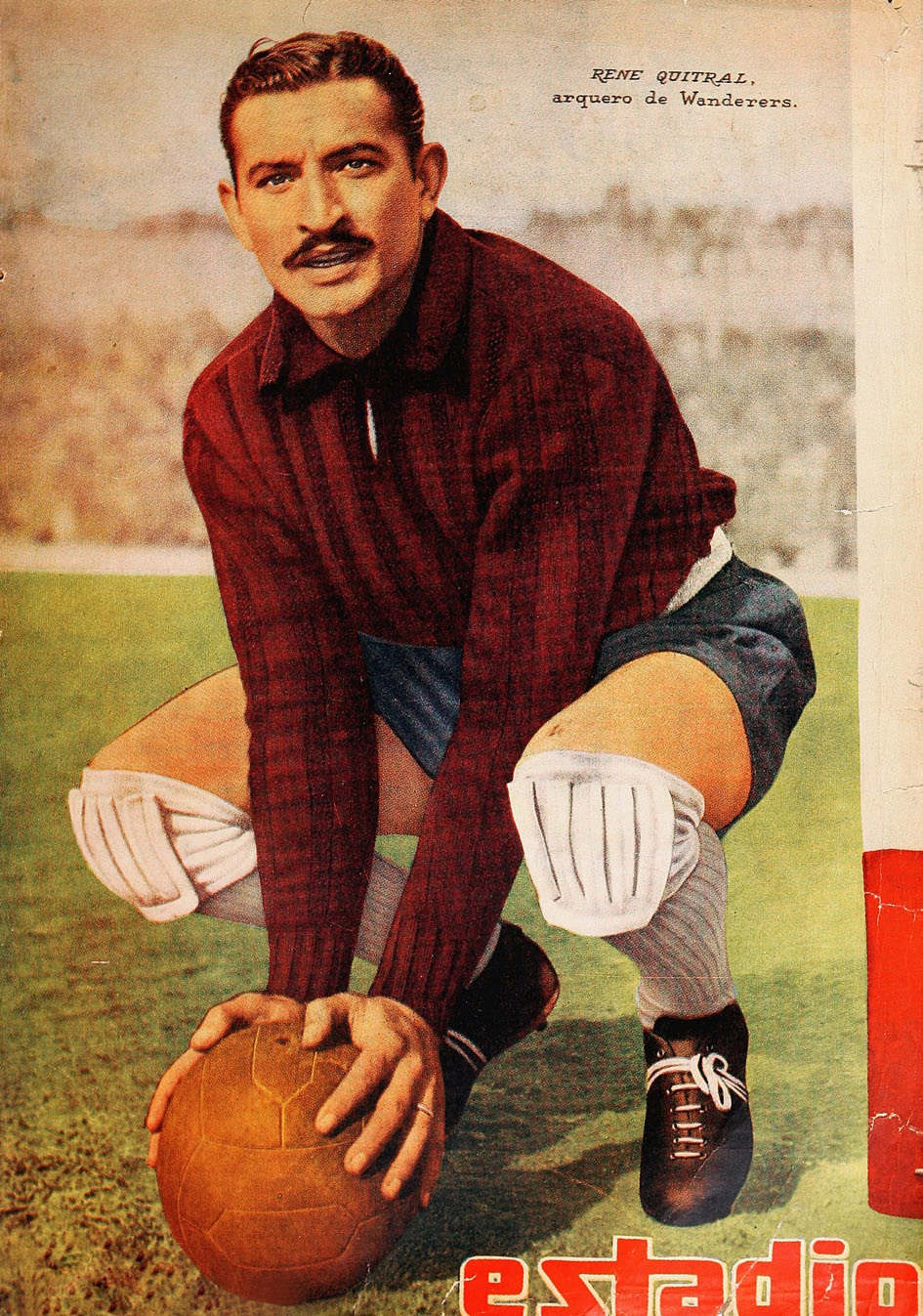

Personal information
- Full name: Ángel René Quitral Encina
- Date of birth: 15 September 1924
- Place of birth: Santiago, Chile
- Date of death: 27 November 1982 (aged 58)
- Height: 1.89 m (6 ft 2 1/2 in)
- Position: Goalkeeper

Senior career*
Years	Team	Apps	(Gls)
1947–1948	Bádminton		
1949–1954	Santiago Wanderers		
1955–1958	San Luis		

International career
1950-1957	Chile	7	(0)
- * Club domestic league appearances and goals

Ángel René Quitral Encina (15 September 1924 – 27 November 1982) was a Chilean football goalkeeper who was part of the national soccer team Chile in the 1950 FIFA World Cup. He also played for Bádminton (1947–1948), Santiago Wanderers (1949–1954), and San Luis de Quillota (1955–1958). He also participated in the 1958 FIFA World Cup Sweden Eliminatory process. He had two titles in his career: 1955 and 1958, second division Championship with San Luis de Quillota, being one of the biggest references until this time for this Club.

== Personal life ==
Quitral was of Mapuche descent.

Quitral died on 26 November 1982, at the age of 62.
