= Norberto Peluffo =

Colombian footballer, coach, and commentator (born 1958)

Personal information
- Full name: Norberto José Peluffo Ortíz
- Date of birth: 26 May 1958 (age 68)
- Place of birth: Colombia
- Position: Midfielder

Senior career*
Years	Team	Apps	(Gls)
1977–1982	Atlético Nacional		
1983–1986	Millonarios		
1987	América de Cali		
1988	Deportes Quindío		
1989	Once Caldas		

Managerial career
- 1991: Atlético Bucaramanga (minor divisions)
- 1992: Alianza Petrolera
- 1993–1994: Atlético Bucaramanga
- 1996–1997: Atlético Nacional
- 1997–1998: Envigado
- 1998–1999: Carabobo
- 2000–2001: Junior
- 2002: Delfines
- 2003–2004: Millonarios
- 2004: Deportivo Cali
- 2005: Deportivo Pereira
- 2006: Junior
- * Club domestic league appearances and goals

Norberto José Peluffo Ortíz (born 26 June 1958) Is a Colombian former soccer player, former coach and current sports commentator.

== Personal life ==
His father, the Colombian-Argentine Norberto Juan Peluffo, was also a professional soccer player and coach.

His brother Martín Peluffo specialized in gastronomy and took care of the family bakery. But he was not far behind and followed the family legacy: he managed to play with Atlético Bucaramanga and as coach directed Real Santander from its foundation until mid-2009, managing more than 100 games.

== Trajectory ==
=== Atlético Nacional ===
He arrived in the green country after club officials saw him at a soccer tournament in the city of Bogotá. At just 13 years old, he arrives in Medellín to train with the club: for 2 years he joined the professional team and at 15 they finally gave him the opportunity to debut, becoming a benchmark with ups and downs.

=== Millionarios ===
He came to the ambassador squad from Atlético Nacional in 1983. With the blues he played 147 games and scored 14 goals, one of them in the 1985 Copa Libertadores.

=== America, Once Caldas and Quindio ===
He came to the América de Cali from Millonarios due to an injury and because of the desire to play again he took new directions, stopping twice at the Deportes Quindío and once in 1987 at the Once Caldas. Adding the injuries and his problem with alcoholism that he had since he was 15 years old, even with a lot of football ahead of him, he decides to hang up his boots and dedicate himself to training players.

=== As a coach ===
As soon as he retired, he decided to continue in football as DT and the Atlético Bucaramanga gave him the opportunity in the lower divisions, where he spent a few months, after the Dimayor approved the Second Division -Primera B. In Colombia, the Alianza Petrolera called him to be the helmsman of the refinery club where he directed throughout 1992. For the 1993–1994 season he returned to the Atlético Bucaramanga where he directed the professional team; for 1995 he does not direct any club; At the beginning of 1996 he received the call from Atletico Nacional to be the coach. With the green country he achieved his first and only title as coach and stayed in Medellin for 2 years. He would go through Envigado and Junior until in 2003-2004 he returned to Millonarios, where he had already been as a player, now in his role as coach and reaches 2 semifinals directing 109 games. At the time, the club was going through its worst economic crisis and Peluffo was fired to the ambassador team at that time. The following year he is hired by Deportivo Cali and the following year by Deportivo Pereira. Without further significance, for many years he was the sports director of Atletico Nacional and since mid-2015 he held that same position in Millonarios.

After managing Junior de Barranquilla he decided that he no longer wanted to manage professional teams and since then he has worked as sports director at Nacional and Millonarios; being, as it is known by many in the sports lexicon, "headhunters" in addition to helping to finish training the players.

== Colombia National Team ==
Peluffo made several appearances for the Colombia national football team, including participation in the Copa América de 1983, where he played against Bolivia and Peru. Peluffo played for Colombia at the 1980 Olympics in Moscow.
