= Marcelo Miranda (footballer) =

Chilean footballer and manager (born 1967)

Personal information
- Full name: Marcelo Alejandro Miranda Díaz
- Date of birth: 29 January 1967 (age 59)
- Place of birth: Santiago, Chile
- Position: Left-back

Youth career
- Soprole
- 1983–1987: Universidad de Chile

Senior career*
Years	Team	Apps	(Gls)
1986–1987	Universidad de Chile	0	(0)
1986	→ Malleco Unido (loan)		
1987–1988	Malleco Unido		
1989–1991	Deportes Concepción	71	(4)
1992–2000	Cobreloa	274	(16)
2001	Colo-Colo	25	(1)

International career
1991–1997	Chile	15	(0)

Managerial career
- 2006: Hossana
- 2007–2008: Malleco Unido
- 2008–2009: Naval
- 2010: Unión Temuco
- 2011–2012: Lota Schwager
- 2012: Naval (interim)
- 2013: Deportes Copiapó
- 2014–2015: Lota Schwager
- 2018–2021: Deportes Melipilla (youth)
- 2022–2023: Cobreloa (youth) (director)
- 2023–: Julio Covarrubias (youth)
- * Club domestic league appearances and goals

Marcelo Alejandro Miranda Díaz (born 29 January 1967) is a Chilean football manager and former player.

== Club career ==
Miranda had trials with Colo-Colo and Unión Española before joining Universidad de Chile from the team of Soprole, aged 16. He was loaned out to Malleco Unido in the Segunda División and returned to Universidad de Chile under Fernando Riera in 1987. After Riera left the team, he was released and returned to Malleco Unido until the 1988 season.

In 1989, Miranda signed with Deportes Concepción under Fernando Cavalleri, with whom he qualified to the 1991 Copa Libertadores, the first time for the club. Uner the same manager, he joined Cobreloa in 1992 and played for them for nine years, winning the 1992 Primera División de Chile.

His last club was Colo-Colo in 2001.

== International career ==
Miranda played in 15 matches for the Chile national team from 1991 to 1997. He was also part of Chile's squad for the 1997 Copa América tournament.

== Managerial career ==
In 2006, Miranda began his managerial career in Hossana, a club of the evangelical community, in the Chilean Tercera División. Later, he managed several clubs at the Tercera División and Primera B such as Lota Schwager and Deportes Copiapó.

In 2023, Miranda started to coach youth players from Padre Hurtado commune and the local club, Julio Covarrubias.

== Honours ==
Cobreloa

- Primera División: 1992
