= Damián Muñoz =

Chilean football manager (born 1984)

Personal information
- Full name: Damián Darío Muñoz Galaz
- Date of birth: 13 January 1984 (age 42)
- Place of birth: Curicó, Chile
- Position: Forward

Youth career
- Colo-Colo

Senior career*
Years	Team	Apps	(Gls)
2002–2005	Curicó Unido		
2006–2007	Iberia		
2008	Curicó Unido		

Managerial career
- 2013–2014: Curicó Unido (women) (youth)
- 2015–2019: Curicó Unido (youth)
- 2018: Curicó Unido (interim)
- 2019–2021: Curicó Unido (assistant)
- 2020: Curicó Unido (interim)
- 2021: Curicó Unido (interim)
- 2021–2023: Curicó Unido
- 2024: Unión San Felipe
- 2025: San Luis
- 2025–2026: Curicó Unido
- * Club domestic league appearances and goals

Damián Darío Muñoz Galaz (born 13 January 1984) is a Chilean football manager and former player who played as a forward.

== Career ==
Born in Curicó, Muñoz played professionally for hometown side Curicó Unido, winning the Tercera División in 2005 and the Primera B in 2008, before taking over their women's youth team in 2013. In 2015, he took over the men's team, but also as a youth coach.

In June 2018, Muñoz was named interim manager after Luis Marcoleta resigned. He returned to his previous duties after the appointment of Jaime Vera, but was named assistant manager of the main squad in October 2019.

Muñoz was again interim in November 2020, after Nicolás Larcamón resigned. He was again assistant after the arrival of Martín Palermo, and returned to the interim role after Palermo resigned on 25 July 2021.

On 21 August 2021, Curicó Unido confirmed Muñoz as manager of the main squad. He qualified the club to the Copa Libertadores for the first time ever in 2022, before being sacked on 22 May 2023.

In the first half of 2025, Muñoz led San Luis de Quillota.

In September 2025, Muñoz returned to led Curicó Unido and left them at the end of the 2026 season.

== Personal life ==
His father, Mario, deceased in 2012, was the president of Curicó Unido from 1998 to 1999.

== Honours ==
=== Player ===
Curicó Unido

- Tercera División: 2005
- Primera B: 2008
