= Lota Schwager =

Chilean football club

- Full name: Club de Deportes Lota Schwager
- Nicknames: Lamparita (The little lamp); Mineros (Miners); Carboneros (Coal miners)
- Founded: 10 May 1901
- Ground: Estadio Federico Schwager, Coronel, Chile
- Capacity: 5,700
- Chairman: Claudio Castro
- Manager: Cristián Gómez
- League: Tercera A
- 2025: 3rd
Home colours	Away colours

Club de Deportes Lota Schwager is a Chilean professional football club based in Coronel, Biobío Region. Founded on 10 May 1966 through the merger of the clubs Minas Lota and Federico Schwager, the club has historically represented the coal-mining communities of Lota and Coronel.

The team is traditionally known as La Lamparita and its supporters as Mineros, reflecting the club's close association with the coal industry of the area.

Lota Schwager currently competes in the Segunda División Profesional, the third tier of Chilean football, following its return to professional competition in 2026. The club has traditionally played its home matches at the Estadio Federico Schwager in Coronel.

The club has won the Chilean second-tier championship twice, in 1969 and 1986, and has spent several periods in the Primera División. Its longest continuous spell in the top flight lasted from 1970 to 1980, while it also reached the final of the Copa Chile in 1975. After withdrawing from professional football during the 1990s, Lota Schwager was refounded in 2001 and won the Tercera División in its first season back, beginning a new period in the national league system.

== History ==
=== Early years: 1966–1994 ===
Lota Schwager was founded on 10 May 1966 through the merger of Minas Lota and Federico Schwager, two clubs from the Campeonato Regional de Concepción that represented the coal-mining companies of Lota and Schwager, respectively. Closely identified with the coal-mining communities of the Biobío Region, the new club entered the professional Segunda División in the same year and finished ninth in its inaugural season.

Three years after its foundation, Lota Schwager won the 1969 Segunda División championship and earned promotion to the Primera División for the first time. The club finished the season with 17 victories from 26 matches, four points ahead of Ñublense and San Luis, securing its first professional title.

Lota Schwager established itself in the top flight during the 1970s, a period that became the most successful in the club's early history. In 1975, the team reached the final of the Copa Chile, where it was defeated 4–0 by Palestino. Two years later, under manager Vicente Cantatore, Lota recorded its best Primera División campaign of the period, finishing sixth in the 1977 championship.

After eleven consecutive seasons in the top division, Lota Schwager was relegated in 1980. The club returned to Primera División after winning its second Segunda División championship in 1986, but the comeback was brief and it returned to the second tier after the 1987 season. The following years coincided with the growing economic crisis of the coal industry in the area, which also affected the club financially.

The decline culminated in 1994, when Lota Schwager finished last in the second division and was relegated to the Tercera División. Facing serious financial difficulties, the club subsequently ceased competing, ending almost three decades of uninterrupted participation in Chilean professional football.

=== Return to professional football ===
Lota Schwager was reorganized in 2001 and returned to competition in the Tercera División. The revival was immediately successful: under manager Eduardo Apablaza, the club won the 2001 championship after defeating Deportes Copiapó in a three-match final, earning promotion and returning to professional football.

After several seasons in Primera B, Lota Schwager came close to the top flight again in 2006. The club qualified for the promotion play-offs and faced Rangers. After losing the first leg 2–1 in Talca, Lota won the return match by the same score in Coronel and prevailed 4–3 in the penalty shoot-out, securing its return to Primera División after an absence of almost two decades.

The club's return to Primera División lasted only one season. Lota struggled throughout the 2007 campaign and was relegated after losing 2–1 to Deportes Antofagasta on the final matchday. It returned to Primera B in 2008, where it remained for the following seven seasons.

=== Decline and amateur football ===
Lota Schwager experienced increasing sporting and financial difficulties during the first half of the 2010s. The club initially finished in the relegation position in the 2013–14 Primera B season, but remained in the division after Naval was sanctioned with relegation for financial irregularities. The reprieve lasted only one year. In 2014–15, Lota finished bottom of Primera B with 31 points and was relegated to the Segunda División Profesional.

The club subsequently left the professional divisions and entered a prolonged period in the amateur categories of Chilean football. In 2019, Lota Schwager competed in the Tercera División B and earned promotion to Tercera A after defeating Municipal Lampa 3–0 and 6–0 in the promotion play-off. The second leg in Coronel was followed by celebrations involving thousands of supporters at the Estadio Bernardino Luna.

After further institutional and sporting difficulties, the club competed again in Tercera B in 2023 and 2024. Under manager Renato Ramos, Lota Schwager won the southern group of the 2024 Tercera B championship. A 2–0 victory over regional rivals Naval on the final matchday secured the title and promotion to Tercera A, marking the club's first championship since its 2001 Tercera División title.

Lota continued its recovery during the 2025 Tercera A season, finishing third in the regular-season standings with 53 points. After the conclusion of the promotion play-offs, the club received an opportunity to compete for an additional place in the Segunda División Profesional. On 7 March 2026, Lota Schwager faced Comunal Cabrero at the Estadio Ester Roa Rebolledo. Following a 0–0 draw, Lota won the penalty shoot-out 6–5, securing promotion and returning to professional football for the 2026 season. The return ended a prolonged absence from the professional divisions and placed Lota Schwager once again within the competitions organized by the ANFP.

== Current squad ==
As of 26 April 2026 Note: Flags indicate national team as defined under FIFA eligibility rules; some limited exceptions apply. Players may hold more than one non-FIFA nationality.

No.	Pos.	Nation	Player
1	GK	CHI	Benjamín Lagos
2	DF	CHI	Juan Pablo Reyes
3	DF	CHI	Diego Torres
4	DF	CHI	Agustín Ambiado
5	DF	CHI	Mijael Muñoz
6	DF	CHI	Juan José Contreras
7	FW	CHI	Cristóbal Díaz
8	MF	CHI	Leonardo Povea (c)
9	FW	ARG	Lucas Quiroga
10	MF	CHI	Diego Bravo
11	FW	CHI	Fabián Neira
12	GK	CHI	Gabriel Fuentes
13	DF	CHI	Dilan Alvarado
14	MF	CHI	Gerardo Navarrete
15	DF	CHI	Byron Hermosilla

No.	Pos.	Nation	Player
16	MF	CHI	Nicolás Lincopán (loan from Universidad de Concepción)
17	FW	CHI	Vicente Oñate (loan from Universidad de Concepción)
18	FW	CHI	Cristofer Salas
19	DF	CHI	Cristóbal Vergara
20	MF	CHI	Paolo Fuentes
21	DF	CHI	Claudio Jopia
22	DF	CHI	Gianfranco Catrileo
23	MF	CHI	Sebastián Torres Sepúlveda
24	MF	CHI	Felipe Ortiz
25	FW	CHI	Luca Pontigo
26	GK	CHI	Patricio Silva
27	FW	CHI	Sebastián Torres González
28	MF	CHI	Jordy Contreras
30	FW	CHI	Ignacio Chandía
31	MF	CHI	Marcelo Zambrano

== Managers ==
- (Chile) Hernán Gaete (1966–1968)
- (Chile) Alicel Belmar (1969)
- (Chile) Isaac Carrasco (1969)
- (Chile) Luis Álamos (1970)
- (Chile) Óscar Andrade (1971–1972)
- (Chile) Dante Pesce (1972–1973)
- (Chile) Sergio Cruzat (1973–1974)
- (Chile) Nelson Oyarzún (1975)
- (Chile) Jorge Luco (1975)
- (Chile) Alicel Belmar (1975–1976)
- (Uruguay) Mario Patrón (1976)
- (Argentina) (Chile) Vicente Cantatore (1976–1978)
- (Chile) José Benito Ríos (1979–1980)
- (Chile) Luis Vera (1980)
- (Argentina) Juan Nawacki (1983)
- (Chile) Guillermo Quiroga (1984)
- (Chile) Ramón Climent (1985)
- (Chile) Juan Carlos Gangas (1986–1987)
- (Chile) Guillermo Páez (1988)
- (Chile) Ramón Climent (1989)
- (Chile) Isaac Carrasco (1990)
- (Chile) Francisco Valdés (1991)
- (Chile) Ramón Soto (1992)
- (Chile) Víctor Manuel González (1992)
- (Chile) José Benito Ríos (1992–1993)
- (Argentina) Daniel Montilla (1994)
- (Chile) Eduardo Apablaza (1994)
- (Chile) Osvaldo Hidalgo (2001)
- (Chile) Eduardo Apablaza (2001–2002)
- (Chile) Juan Rivera (2002)
- (Chile) Álex Barrales (2002)
- (Chile) Víctor Manuel González (2002–2003)
- (Chile) Juan Manuel Ramírez (2004)
- (Chile) Juan Rivera (2004)
- (Chile) Héctor Balocchi (2004)
- (Chile) Jaime Zapata (2004)
- (Chile) Leonardo Vinés (2004)
- (Chile) Humberto López (2006)
- (Brazil) Márcio da Silva (2006)
- (Chile) Jaime Nova (2006)
- (Chile) Rodrigo Monsalves (2007)
- (Paraguay) Sergio Nichiporuk (2007)
- (Chile) Víctor Merello (2007)
- (Chile) Héctor Jara (2007)
- (Chile) Leonardo Vinés (2007)
- (Chile) Juan Martínez (2008)
- (Chile) Jaime Nova (2008)
- (Chile) Orlando Iturra (2008)
- (Chile) Nelson Soto (2009)
- (Chile) Juan Martínez (2009–2010)
- (Chile) Mario Araya (2010)
- (Paraguay) Javier Araujo (2011)
- (Chile) Marcelo Miranda (2011–2012)
- (Chile) Nelson Cossio (2012–2013)
- (Chile) Héctor Balocchi (2013)
- (Chile) Jaime Nova (2013)
- (Argentina) Germán Corengia (2013–2014)
- (Chile) Nelson Cossio (2014)
- (Chile) Héctor Balocchi (2014)
- (Chile) Marcelo Miranda (2014–2015)
- (Chile) Iván Endre (2015)
- (Chile) Osvaldo Hidalgo (2015)
- (Chile) Iván Endre (2015)
- (Chile) Francisco Castillo (2015–2016)
- (Chile) Víctor González + Rocío Yáñez (2016–2017)
- (Chile) Jaime Pacheco (2017)
- (Chile) Jorge Torres (2017–2018)
- (Chile) Cristián Gómez (2019–2021)
- (Chile) Mario Salgado (2021–2022)
- (Chile) Renato Ramos (2023 – present)

== Honours ==
- Primera B: 2

1969, 1986

- Tercera División Chilena: 1

2001
