= José Benito Ríos =

Chilean footballer (1935-2008)

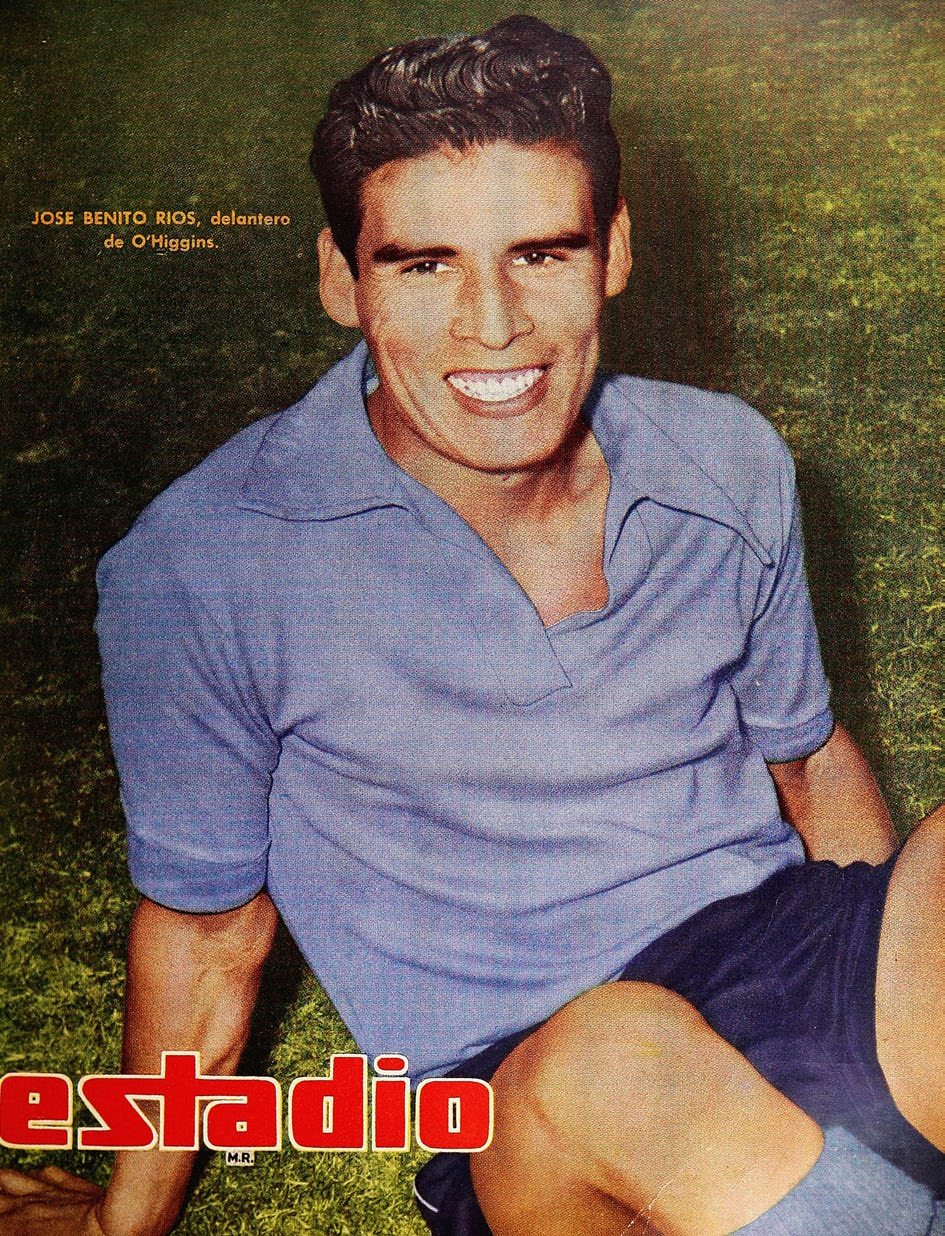

Personal information
- Full name: José Benito Ríos González
- Date of birth: 4 March 1935
- Place of birth: Quillota, Chile
- Date of death: 30 April 2008 (aged 73)
- Place of death: Coronel, Chile
- Position: Forward

Senior career*
Years	Team	Apps	(Gls)
1954–1956	Unión La Calera		
1957–1958	Huachipato		
1959–1960	O'Higgins		
1961–1967	San Luis Quillota		
1968–1970	Lota Schwager		
1971–1973	Ñublense		
- * Club domestic league appearances and goals as of 7 December 2015

José Benito Ríos González (born 4 March 1935–30 May 2008) was a Chilean footballer.

== Honours ==
=== Club ===
Lota Schawager

- Segunda División: 1969

=== Individual ===
- Campeonato Nacional (Chile) Top-Scorer: 1959
