= Mauricio Giganti =

Argentine footballer (born 1976)

Personal information
- Date of birth: 6 November 1976 (age 49)
- Place of birth: General Pico, Argentina
- Height: 1.73 m (5 ft 8 in)
- Position: Forward

Team information
- Current team: Olimpo (head coach)

Senior career*
Years	Team	Apps	(Gls)
1996	Boca Juniors		
1996–1997	Almagro		
1997–1998	Atlanta		
1998–1999	Unión Española		
1999–2000	Osorno		
2001–2002	Melipilla		
2002–2003	Municipal Liberia		
2004	Acassuso		
2004	Hue		
2005–2007	Ferro Carril Oeste (GP)		

Managerial career
- 2010: Hue
- 2011–2012: Ferro Carril Oeste (GP)
- 2012: San Luis de Quillota
- 2013: Santiago Morning
- 2013: Curicó Unido
- 2014–2017: Ferro Carril Oeste (GP)
- 2017–2019: Alvarado
- 2019–2020: Ferro Carril Oeste (GP)
- 2020–2021: Estudiantes de Buenos Aires
- 2022–2023: Atlanta
- 2024: Alvarado
- 2025–: Olimpo
- * Club domestic league appearances and goals

Mauricio Giganti (born 6 November 1976) is an Argentine football manager and former player. A forward, he played for clubs of Argentina, Chile, Costa Rica and Vietnam.
