= Miguel Ángel López (footballer) =

Argentine footballer (1942–2025)

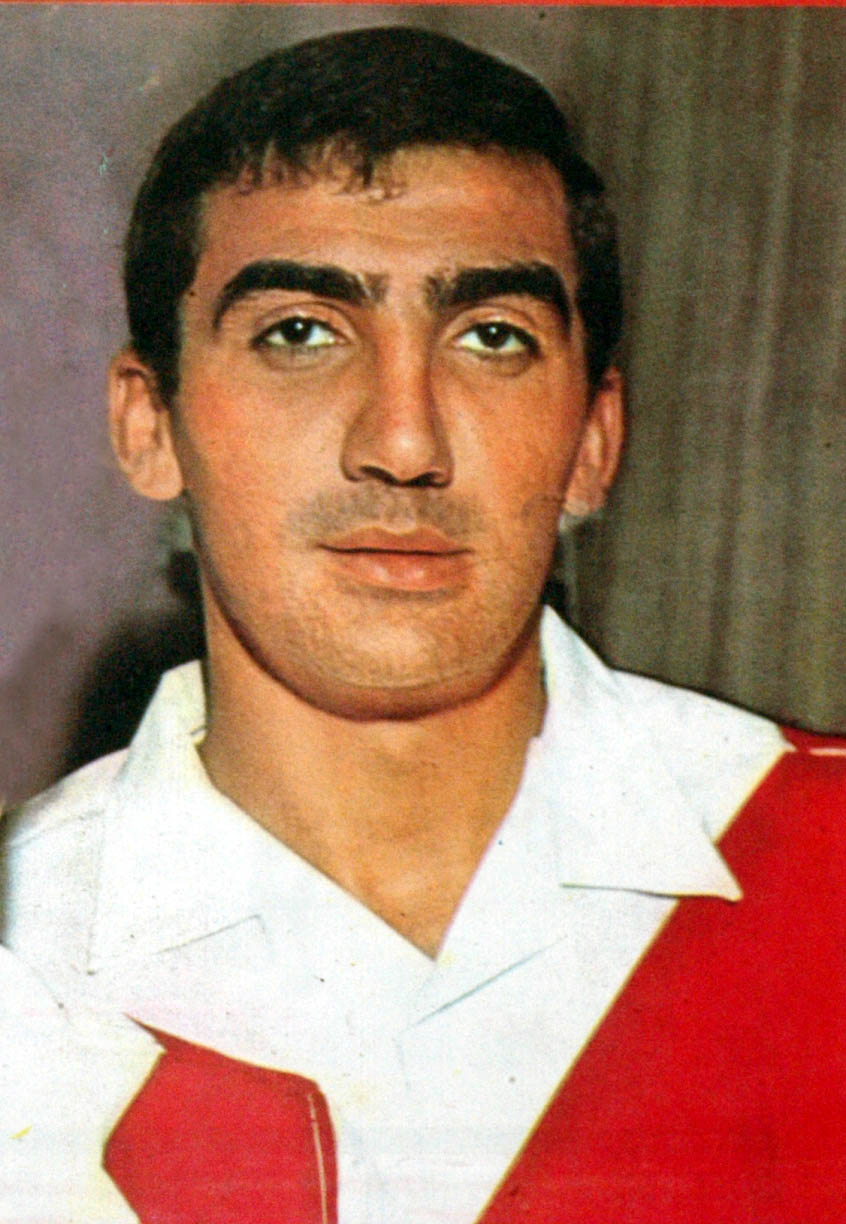
- López with River Plate in 1968

Personal information
- Date of birth: 1 March 1942
- Place of birth: Villa María, Córdoba, Argentina
- Date of death: 7 July 2025 (aged 83)
- Place of death: Barranquilla, Colombia
- Position: Defender

Senior career*
Years	Team	Apps	(Gls)
–1962	Universitario (Cba)		
1963	Sarmiento (J)	22	(0)
1964–1966	Estudiantes LP	87	(1)
1967	Ferro Carril Oeste	23	(0)
1968–1970	River Plate	79	(1)
1971–1975	Independiente	136	(1)
1975–1976	Atlético Nacional		

International career
1972	Argentina		

Managerial career
- 1977: Atlético Nacional
- 1978: Atlético Junior
- 1979: Argentinos Juniors
- 1980–1981: Independiente
- 1982: Atlético Nacional
- 1983: Boca Juniors
- 1984: Rosario Central
- 1984–1987: Club América
- 1988: Ferro Carril Oeste
- 1988: Atlético Junior
- 1989–1991: Guadalajara
- 1992: Atlético Junior
- 1992–1993: Club América
- 1994: Barcelona
- 1994–1995: Santos Laguna
- 1995: Independiente
- 1995–1996: Toluca
- 1996: León
- 1997–1998: Santos Laguna
- 1999: Atlético Junior
- 2000: Al-Ahli
- 2001: Atlético Celaya
- 2002: Puebla
- 2003: Badajoz
- 2004–2005: Atlético Junior
- 2006: Arsenal
- 2007: Atlético Junior
- 2009–2010: Atlético San Luis
- 2013–2014: Atlético Junior
- * Club domestic league appearances and goals

Miguel Ángel López Elhall (1 March 1942 – 7 July 2025), nicknamed Zurdo, was an Argentine football player and manager. As a player, he had his most successful tenure on Independiente, where he won eight titles.

== Playing career ==
López started playing in Unión Central of Villa María, Córdoba, then moving to Club Universitario. In 1963, he was traded to Sarmiento de Junín, then to Estudiantes de La Plata to make his debut in 1964. Three years later, he signed for Ferro Carril Oeste in exchange for Felipe Ribaudo.

His good performances in Ferro led López to be capped for the Argentina national team. At club level, he then moved to River Plate, then to Independiente, where he spent his most successful years as a player. With the Avellaneda team López won four Copa Libertadores (1972, 1973, 1974, 1975), three Copa Interamericana (1972, 1974, 1975) and one Intercontinental Cup in 1973 v Italian Juventus FC.

After winning eight titles with Independiente, López emigrated to Colombia to play for Atlético Nacional, where he won the National championship in 1976.

== Managerial career ==
After retiring from football, López became a manager, starting to coach the youth divisions of Atlético Nacional in 1977. Two years later, he returned to Argentina as Argentinos Juniors manager, where he coached rising star Diego Maradona. In 1980, he signed for Independiente, winning his first title, the friendly tournament "Torneo Villa de Madrid".

López returned to Colombia in 1982 to coach Atlético Nacional, where he spent a brief time before becoming manager of Boca Juniors but he only spent one season with the team. In 1984, López signed for Mexican Club América, where he won the 1984–85 championship. After a season with Ferro Carril Oeste in 1988, López made his third return to Colombia to manage Atlético Junior. His next team was C.D. Guadalajara in 1990.

== Death ==
Lopez died on 7 July 2025, at the age of 83.
