= San Luis de Quillota =

Association football club in Chile

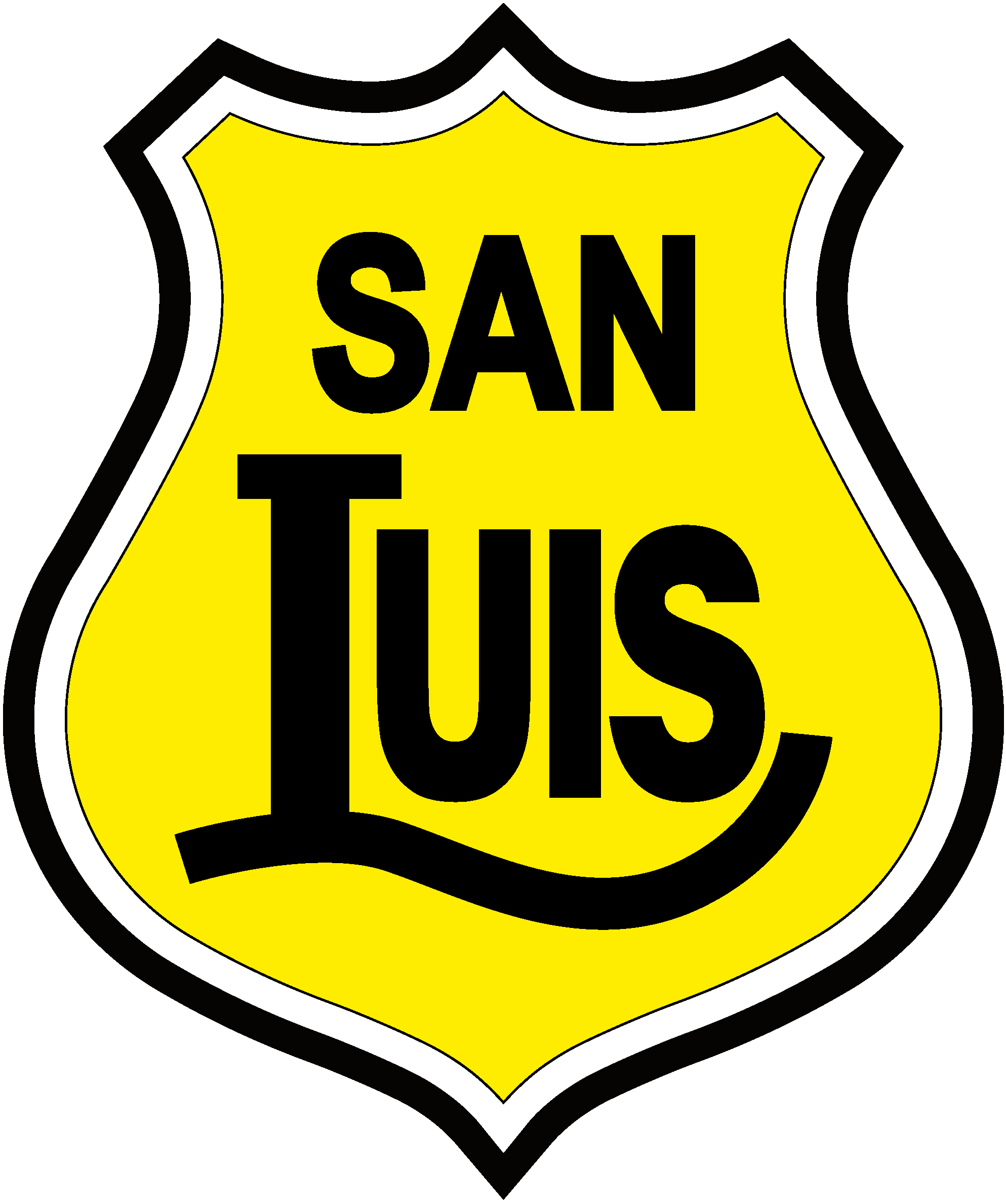
- Nicknames: Canarios; Santo
- Founded: December 8, 1919; 106 years ago
- Ground: Estadio Bicentenario Lucio Fariña, Quillota, Chile
- Capacity: 7,700
- Chairman: Iván Cisternas
- Coach: Damián Muñoz
- League: Primera B
- 2025: Primera B, 9th of 16
Home colours	Away colours

San Luis de Quillota is a Chilean professional association football club based in Quillota, Valparaíso Region. Founded on 8 December 1919 by students and former students of the Instituto Quillota, the club currently competes in the Primera B, the second tier of the Chilean football league system.

San Luis entered professional football in 1953 and has spent periods in both of Chile's two highest divisions. The club has won the second-tier championship four times, in 1955, 1958, 1980 and 2014–15, and also won the Tercera División in 2003.

San Luis' most recent spell in the Primera División lasted from 2015 until its relegation in 2018.

== History ==
=== Foundation and amateur era ===
San Luis was founded on 8 December 1919 in a classroom of the Instituto Quillota, later renamed Instituto Rafael Ariztía. A group of students and former students of the school, assisted by its Marist director Louis André Tiron, established the club under the name Ex Alumnos del Instituto Quillota Football Club.

On 4 January 1921, the institution adopted the name San Luis Football Club in honour of Tiron, who was being transferred by the Marist congregation to a school in Callao, Peru. The football section was reorganised later that year and entered the Liga de Football de Quillota in 1922. San Luis won the league's second division in its first season and was promoted to the local top division.

During the following decades, the club competed primarily in the Quillota association. It won several local championships, including league titles during the 1920s, 1930s and 1940s, before seeking admission to the national professional structure.

=== Entry into professional football ===
San Luis entered the professional Segunda División in 1953. After finishing sixth in its first season and fourth in 1954, the club won the 1955 Segunda División, finishing ahead of local rivals Unión La Calera and earning promotion to the Primera División for the first time.

San Luis made its top-flight debut in 1956. In the following season, it initially finished third in the standings, but was deducted 13 points because of an irregularity in the registration of player Juan José Negri, resulting in relegation. The club immediately recovered its place in the Primera División by winning the 1958 Segunda División championship. It subsequently remained in the top flight until its relegation at the end of the 1967 season.

After thirteen seasons in the second tier, San Luis won the Segunda División again in 1980. The club secured promotion with four matches remaining after defeating Unión La Calera 3–1 in Quillota, and finished the championship with 59 points. That year San Luis also won the Campeonato de Apertura de Segunda División, known through its sponsorship as the Polla Gol tournament.

The team included players such as Patricio Yáñez, Víctor Cabrera and Jorge Muñoz. Yáñez became a Chile international while playing for San Luis and later represented the national team at the 1982 FIFA World Cup.

San Luis returned to the Primera División for the 1981 season but was relegated that year. It earned another promotion after finishing runner-up in the 1983 Segunda División and remained in the top flight from 1984 until 1987.

=== Tercera División ===
Following relegation from the Primera División in 1987, San Luis later dropped from the second tier in 1990 and entered the Tercera División. The club remained outside professional football for thirteen seasons.

San Luis won the 2003 Tercera División under coach Mauricio Riffo. The title was secured on 14 December after a 1–0 away victory over Iberia in Los Ángeles, allowing the club to return to the professional divisions for the 2004 season. The 2003 squad included Humberto Suazo, who scored 39 goals during the campaign before later establishing himself with the Chile national team and clubs in Chile, Mexico and Spain.

=== Return to profesionalism ===
After several seasons in Primera B, San Luis won the 2009 Clausura tournament and subsequently contested the promotion play-offs. The club first lost the second-promotion final to Santiago Wanderers, which left it to face Primera División side Curicó Unido in the promotion/relegation play-off.

San Luis lost the first leg 2–1 but won the return match 3–0 on 6 December 2009 at the Estadio Jorge Silva Valenzuela in San Fernando. Goals from Fernando Alves Machado, Alexis Flores and Bryan Danessi gave San Luis a 4–2 aggregate victory and returned the club to the Primera División after 22 years.

The club's return to the top division was brief. San Luis finished last in the 2010 Primera División and was relegated to Primera B after one season.

San Luis won the Apertura tournament of the 2013–14 Primera B season. The result qualified the club for the post-season play-offs for promotion, where it defeated Coquimbo Unido before facing Barnechea in the final. The two-legged tie ended 1–1 on aggregate, and Barnechea won the penalty shoot-out 4–3, leaving San Luis in the second division.

For the 2014–15 season, former San Luis player Víctor Rivero was appointed head coach. The team led the championship and secured both the title and promotion on 2 May 2015 with a 1–0 home victory over Lota Schwager, Rafael Viotti scoring the only goal. San Luis finished the campaign nine points ahead of second-placed Unión San Felipe.

San Luis returned to the Primera División for the 2015–16 season. After a difficult Apertura tournament, Argentine coach Mario Sciacqua was replaced by Miguel Ramírez. The club subsequently avoided relegation and remained in the top flight through the following seasons.

During the 2018 championship, San Luis remained near the bottom of the standings. Ramírez left during the season and was replaced by Diego Osella, with Mauricio Riffo later taking charge for the final matches. On 25 November 2018, a defeat to Universidad de Concepción mathematically confirmed San Luis' relegation with one round remaining.

San Luis has competed in Primera B since the 2019 season. As of 2026, the club continues to participate in the second tier of Chilean football.

== Seasons ==
- Seasons in Primera División: 21 (1956–1957, 1959–1967, 1981, 1984–1987, 2010, 2015–16–2018)
- Seasons in Segunda División/Primera B: 41 (1953–1955, 1958, 1968–1980, 1982–1983, 1988–1990, 2004–2009, 2019–Present)
- Seasons in Tercera División/Tercera A: 13 (1991–2003)

== Honours ==
=== National ===
- Primera B
  - Winners (5): 1955, 1958, 1980, 2013-A, 2014–15
- Tercera División
  - Winners (1): 2003

== Players ==
=== Current squad ===
Current squad of San Luis de Quillota as of 4 July 2026 (edit)
Sources: ANFP Official Web Site

No.		Position	Player
1	ARG	GK	Nicolás Peranic (c)
3	CHI	DF	Ignacio Meza
4	CHI	DF	Vicente Durán
5	ARG	MF	Joel Torres
6	CHI	DF	Luis Muñoz
7	CHI	FW	Sergio Vergara
8	MEX	FW	Gael Acosta
9	MEX	FW	Guillermo Madrigal
10	CHI	FW	Sebastián Parada
11	CHI	FW	Martín Carreño
12	CHI	GK	Fernando Abarzúa
13	CHI	DF	Nicolás Muñoz
14	CHI	MF	Daniel Monardes
15	CHI	MF	Franco Cortés
16	CHI	DF	Diego Zamorano
17	ARG	MF	Facundo Juárez
18	CHI	DF	Guillermo Avello
19	URU	FW	Diego González
20	CHI	MF	Carlos Hormazábal

No.		Position	Player
21	USA	MF	Fabián Pastenes
22	CHI	MF	Gonzalo Bustos
23	CHI	GK	Tomás Charpentier
24	CHI	FW	Javier Castro
25	CHI	DF	Pablo Millán
27	CHI	FW	Gamal Plaza
28	CHI	DF	Mateo Guerra
29	CHI	GK	Tomás Yáñez
30	CHI	DF	Lucciano Moreno
31	CHI	FW	Yerald Pinilla
32	CHI	DF	Alonso Villegas (loan from Universidad de Chile)
33	CHI	MF	Fabián González
34	CHI	MF	Danilo Catalán
35	CHI	MF	Juan Ignacio Tello
36	CHI	FW	Lucas Tapia
37	CHI	GK	Darío Yáñez
38	CHI	FW	Benjamín Meneses
39	CHI	DF	Benjamín Rojas
40	CHI	FW	Kevin Velozo

Manager: Humberto Suazo

=== 2021 Winter transfers ===
==== In ====
Note: Flags indicate national team as defined under FIFA eligibility rules; some limited exceptions apply. Players may hold more than one non-FIFA nationality.

No.	Pos.	Nation	Player
1	GK	CHI	Brayan Manosalva (from Huachipato)
15	FW	ARG	Fernando Coniglio (loan from Huracán)
27	FW	ARG	Maximiliano Cuadra (loan from Unión La Calera)

No.	Pos.	Nation	Player
29	DF	ARG	Ezequiel Luna (free)
31	FW	CHI	Alexis Valencia (loan from Santiago Wanderers)

==== Out ====
Note: Flags indicate national team as defined under FIFA eligibility rules; some limited exceptions apply. Players may hold more than one non-FIFA nationality.

No.	Pos.	Nation	Player
1	GK	CHI	Paulo Garcés (to Deportes Valdivia)
10	MF	ARG	Claudio Mosca (to Ferro Carril Oeste)
28	MF	CHI	Nicolás Lecaros (loan to Deportes Vallenar)

No.	Pos.	Nation	Player
29	MF	ARG	Andrés Lioi (loan to Deportes Iberia)
31	MF	CHI	Ed Verhoeven (loan to Lanús II)

== Managers ==
Interim coaches appear in italics.

- (Wales) Frank Powell (1929–1930)
- (Chile) Guillermo Báez (1949–1950)
- (Chile) Julio Varela (1951)
- (Chile) Arturo Carmona (1953)
- (Chile) Sergio Cruzat (1953)
- (Chile) Luis Vidal (1954)
- (Chile) Enrique Sorrel (1955)
- (Argentina) Carlos Orlandelli (1956)
- (Chile) Ulises Ramos (1957)
- (Chile) Luis Tirado (1958)
- (Socialist Federal Republic of Yugoslavia) Miodrag Stefanović (1959)
- (Hungary) Ladislao Pakozdi (1959)
- (Chile) René Quitral (1960)
- (Chile) Raúl Marchant (1961)
- (Chile) Julio Varela (1961)
- (Chile) René Quitral (1961)
- (Chile) Andrés Prieto (1962)
- (Chile) Dante Pesce (1963–1964)
- (Chile) René Quitral (1964)
- (Chile) managerial committee (1964)
- (Chile) Francisco Torres (1964–1965)
- (Hungary) Francisco Platko (1965)
- (Chile) Francisco Torres (1965–1967)
- (Chile) Fernando Mondaca (1967)
- (Chile) José Benito Ríos & Hugo Royo (1967)
- (Chile) Sergio Cruzat (1967)
- (Chile) Julio Varela (1968)
- (Chile) Daniel Torres (1968)
- (Chile) Sergio Navarro (1969)
- (Chile) Raúl Chávez (1973)
- (Uruguay) Adolfo Rodríguez (1974)
- (Chile) Álex Veloso (1979–1980)
- (Chile) Julio Baldovinos (1981)
- (Chile) Juan Rodríguez (1981)
- (Chile) Hernán Godoy (1982)
- (Chile) Wilson Castillo (1982)
- (Chile) Jaime Campos (1982)
- (Chile) Alicel Belmar (1983)
- (Chile) Manuel Rubilar (1984)
- (Chile) Ricardo Contreras (1984)
- (Chile) Alicel Belmar (1984–1985)
- (Chile) René Gatica (1985–1986)
- (Chile) Álex Veloso (1986)
- (Chile) René Gatica (1986)
- (Chile) Germán Cornejo (1986)
- (Chile) Eugenio Jara (1987)
- Uruguay Graffigna (1987)
- (Chile) Antonio Vargas (1987)
- (Chile) René Gatica (1987–1988)
- (Chile) Carlos Moreira (1988)
- (Chile) Francisco Valdés (1988)
- (Argentina) Roque Mercury (1989)
- (Chile) René Gatica (1989–1990)
- (Chile) Álex Veloso (1990–1991)
- (Argentina) Roque Mercury (1991)
- (Chile) Álex Veloso (1991)
- (Chile) Lionel Gatica (1992)
- (Chile) Manuel Espinoza (1993)
- (Chile) René Gatica (1993)
- (Chile) Manuel Rubilar (1994)
- (Chile) Isaac Carrasco (1994)
- (Chile) René Gatica (1994–1995)
- (Chile) Víctor Solar (1996)
- (Chile) Antonio Vargas (1996)
- (Chile) Ricardo Acuña (1997)
- (Chile) Antonio Vargas (1997)
- (Chile) Carlos Sandoval (1997)
- (Chile) Wilson Castillo (1998)
- (Chile) Pedro Brante & Martín Fierro (1998)
- (Chile) Eddio Inostroza (1998–1999)
- (Chile) Jaime Zapata (1999)
- (Chile) Lionel Gatica (2000)
- (Chile) Alfredo Núñez (2001)
- (Chile) Rodolfo Dubó (2001–2002)
- (Chile) Mauricio Riffo (2003–2007)
- (Chile) Raúl Ormeño (2007–2008)
- (Chile) Lionel Gatica (2008)
- (Chile) Leonardo Vinés (2008)
- (Chile) Lionel Gatica (2008)
- (Argentina) Diego Osella (2009–2010)
- (Argentina) Roberto Mariani (2010)
- (Chile) Christian Ochoa (2010)
- (Chile) Luis Rodríguez (2011)
- (Chile) Nelson Cossio (2011)
- (Chile) Nelson Soto (2012)
- (Argentina) Mauricio Giganti (2012)
- (Chile) Miguel Ponce (2013–2014)
- (Chile) Nelson Cossio (2014)
- (Chile) Víctor Rivero (2014–2015)
- (Argentina) Mario Sciacqua (2015)
- (Chile) Miguel Ramírez (2015–2018)
- (Argentina) Diego Osella (2018)
- (Chile) Mauricio Riffo (2018)
- (Argentina) Nicolás Frutos (2019)
- (Chile) Mauricio Riffo (2019)
- (Argentina) Darío Franco (2019)
- (Argentina) José María Martínez (2019)
- (Chile) Víctor Rivero (2020)
- (Argentina) Marcelo Raya (2020)
- (Argentina) José María Martínez (2020–2021)
- (Chile) Víctor Cancino (2021)
- (Chile) Francisco Bozán (2021)
- (Argentina) Nicolás Vazzoler (2022)
- (Chile) Francisco Bozán (2022–2023)
- (Argentina) Juan Manuel López (2024)
- (Chile) Juan José Ribera (2024)
- (Chile) Francisco Bozán (2024)
- (Chile) Damián Muñoz (2025)
- (Chile) Humberto Suazo (2026–)
