= Curicó Unido =

Chilean football club

- Full name: Club de Deportes Provincial Curicó Unido
- Nicknames: Curi; Albirrojos (The red & white); Torteros (The Cake-makers); La Banda Sangre (The Blood Stripe)
- Founded: 26 February 1973; 53 years ago
- Ground: Estadio La Granja
- Capacity: 8,016
- Chairman: Patricio Romero
- Coach: Héctor Almandoz
- League: Primera B
- 2025: Primera B, 13th of 16
- Website: web.cdpcuricounido.cl
Home colours	Away colours

Curicó Unido is a football club based in Curicó, Maule Region, Chile. They currently play in the Primera B de Chile, the second level of the Chilean football system. They are currently managed by Héctor Almandoz.

== History ==
Curicó Unido was founded on 26 February 1973, with Edmundo Rojas as the first President of the club. They became the fourth football team from the Curicó city to play at the professional level, after Alianza de Curicó, Luis Cruz Martínez and Bádminton de Curicó.

Curicó Unido played since the season 1974 at the Primera B, but after seven poor seasons they gained relegation to the third level to the season 1981, returning to Primera B two years later, in 1983.

1984 and 1985 were the best seasons of Curicó Unido history, disputing the promotion until the last week, but with bad luck at the final matches.

The next campaigns were average, with the exception of the season 1990, when they lose the category after the final match with Deportes Valdivia, when they won 4–1, two goals short what they needed to stay at Primera B.

Since then, they stayed at the Tercera División without real chances to return to the Primera B, until the 2003 season. But at the next year that changed.

In 2004 the albirrojos were really close to return to the Primera B. At the last week of the season, in Chillán, they arrived as leaders, to face Ñublense who was three points behind at the table; however the Chillanejos won that game 2–1, forcing a tie breaker match in Linares, where Ñublense won 2–0, taking the title and the promotion.

However, the year 2005 Curicó Unido had his revenge. They disputed the title with Trasandino until the last week. While Trasandino tied with Municipal Iquique, Curicó crushed Iberia 4–0, and in this way, after 15 years of suffering, Provincial Curicó Unido returned to the Chilean professional football.

In 2006, in their return to the Primera B, Curicó Unido finished in fifth place.

The next year, Curico avoided relegation only at the end of the season; Deportes Temuco finished last and fell down to the third level of national football for the upcoming season.

Curicó won promotion to the Primera Division after a 1–0 win over Deportes Puerto Montt on the last home game of the 2008 season, which was enough to securing 1st place of the Primera B and automatic promotion. Only to return to Primera B the next season, after losing a promotion play-off against San Luis.

They returned to the top-tier in 2017, after winning the 2016–17 Primera B tournament.

== Honours ==
- Primera B: 2

2008, 2016–17

- Tercera División: 1

2005

=== Others ===
- Copa Confraternidad (Tercera Div.): 1

1991

- 8 seasons in Primera División (2009, 2017– )
- 26 seasons in Primera B (1974–1980, 1983–1990, 2006–2008, 2010–2016/17)
- 17 seasons in Tercera División (1981–1982, 1991–2005)
- 1 participation in Copa Libertadores (2023)

== Records ==
- Record victory (overall) – 14–0 v. Rengo Unido (Tercera División 2004)
- Record Primera División victory – 5–0 v. O'Higgins (2022)
- Record defeat (overall) – 0–7 v. Universidad Católica (Primera División 2009-C)
- Record Copa Chile victory – 9–0 v. Lister Rossel (1974)
- Most appearances (overall) – 271, Franco Bechtholdt (2012–2022)
- Most goals scored (overall) – 69, Luis Martínez (1983–88)
- Most goals scored (Primera División matches) – 16, Federico Castro (2020, 2022)
- Most Primera División appearances – 124, Franco Bechtholdt (2017–2022)
- Primera División Best Position – 3rd (2022)
- Copa Chile Best Season – Quarter-finals (2009, 2010, 2017)
- Highest home attendance – 8,981 v. Universidad de Chile (14 Jan 1990)

== South American cups history ==
Season	Competition	Round	Country	Club	Home	Away	Aggregate
2023	Copa Libertadores	Second stage	(Paraguay)	Cerro Porteño	0–1	0–1	0–2

== Team colours ==
Curicó Unido's official kit is a white shirt with a diagonal red stripe that crosses the chest from the right shoulder to the left side of the hip. The shorts are black and socks are white.

=== Kit evolution ===
1982
1985
1986
1987
2001
2004
2007
2013

== Sponsorship ==
The club are currently sponsored by Multihogar and their technical sponsors are Dalponte.

=== Shirt Sponsors ===
- 1976: Buses Galgo Azul
- 1977–78: Cecinas Soler
- 1981–82: Multifrut
- 1983–95: Fideos Suazo
- 1996–: Multihogar

== Stadiums ==
Curicó Unido's traditional home-ground is the Estadio La Granja, located in Curicó city; an 8,000 football stadium with an athletic track around the pitch, located in the "La Granja sports complex", leased from Curicó city hall.

Curicó Unido have also used other grounds during their history.

The Estadio Carabineros de Curicó, was Curicó Unido's home in 1976 and 1977.

They also played their Tercera Division league home games of the season 1992, at the Estadio ANFA Luis H. Alvarez.

And recently, during the 2010 season, the Estadio Municipal Jorge Silva de San Fernando, was their temporary home ground due to the reconstruction of the Estadio La Granja.

== Supporters ==
Curicó Unido fans traditionally come from Curicó itself; and from the rest of the Curicó Province, but in smaller numbers.

The largest supporters' group is the Marginales, created in 1997.

Curicó Unido supporters' current main rivals are Rangers de Talca, and Ñublense.

== Current squad ==
Current squad of Curicó Unido as of 26 July 2026 (edit)
Sources: ANFP Official Web Site

No.		Position	Player
1	CHI	GK	Thomas Vergara
2	CHI	DF	Diego Muñoz
3	CHI	DF	Gabriel Sarria
4	ARG	DF	Rodrigo Colombo
5	URU	MF	Bruno Veglio
6	CHI	MF	Dilan Acevedo
7	ARG	FW	Nicolás Fernández (loan from UAI Urquiza)
8	CHI	MF	Joaquín Romo
9	CHI	FW	Leandro Benegas
10	CHI	MF	Javier Retamales
11	CHI	FW	Ian Aliaga
12	CHI	GK	Juan Ruz
13	CHI	FW	Cristian Bustamante
14	CHI	DF	Cristopher Medina (loan from Ñublense)
15	CHI	DF	Henry Sanhueza
17	CHI	FW	Benjamín Inostroza
18	CHI	FW	Francis Pérez
19	CHI	DF	Ronald de la Fuente (c)

No.		Position	Player
20	CHI	FW	Antonio Ramírez
21	CHI	MF	Enzo Ormeño
22	ARG	GK	Damián Tello
23	CHI	DF	Lucas López
24	CHI	DF	Williams Sáez
25	CHI	FW	Mauro Lopes
27	CHI	FW	Joaquín Alfaro
28	CHI	MF	Hans Ibarra
29	CHI	FW	Diego Avendaño
37	CHI	DF	Ronald Guzmán
38	CHI	FW	Vicente Saldivia
39	ARG	DF	Juan Pablo Gómez
40	ARG	DF	Francisco Oliver
41	BRA	FW	Ryann Eduardo
42	CHI	MF	Dylan Millañir
43	CHI	DF	Felipe Gutiérrez
–	URU	MF	Braulio Guisolfo

Manager: Damián Muñoz

=== 2023 Summer transfers ===
==== In ====
Note: Flags indicate national team as defined under FIFA eligibility rules; some limited exceptions apply. Players may hold more than one non-FIFA nationality.

No.	Pos.	Nation	Player
—	DF	ARG	Omar Merlo (from Sporting Cristal)
—	DF	CHI	Augusto Barrios (from Unión Española)
—	DF	CHI	Sebastián Cabrera (from Coquimbo Unido)

No.	Pos.	Nation	Player
—	DF	CHI	Cristopher Barrera (from Palestino)
—	FW	CHI	Jason Flores (from Antofagasta)
—	FW	ARG	Tobías Figueroa (from Antofagasta)

==== Out ====
Note: Flags indicate national team as defined under FIFA eligibility rules; some limited exceptions apply. Players may hold more than one non-FIFA nationality.

No.	Pos.	Nation	Player
9	FW	ARG	Rodrigo Holgado (to Coquimbo Unido)
11	MF	CHI	Bayron Oyarzo (to Ñublense)
13	DF	CHI	José Rojas (Released)

No.	Pos.	Nation	Player
15	DF	CHI	Juan Pablo Gómez (to Universidad de Chile)
17	MF	CHI	Martín Cortés (Released)
32	DF	CHI	Yerson Opazo (Released)

== Coaches ==
- (Chile) Ricardo Oteíza (1973)
- (Chile) Julio Campos (1974)
- (Chile) Eugenio Jara (1974)
- (Chile) Pedro Araya (1975–1976)
- (Chile) Leonardo Bedoya (1976–1977)
- (Chile) Sergio Gutiérrez (1977)
- (Chile) Pedro Araya (1977–1978)
- (Chile) José González (1978–1979)
- (Chile) Luis Álvarez (1979)
- (Chile) Sergio Navarro (1979–1980)
- (Chile) Guillermo Báez (1980)
- (Chile) Luis Álvarez (1981)
- (Chile) Enrique Arredondo (1982)
- (Chile) Francisco Quinteros (1983)
- (Chile) Carlos Contreras (1983)
- (Chile) Eugenio Horta (1983–84)
- (Chile) Sergio Gutiérrez (1985)
- (Chile) Luis Orrego (1985)
- (Chile) Roque Mercury (1986)
- (Chile) Guillermo Páez (1986–1987)
- (Chile) Luis Orrego (1987-1988)
- (Chile) Sergio Gutiérrez (1988–1990)
- (Chile) Manuel Rubilar (1990)
- (Chile) Eugenio Horta (1990–1991)
- (Chile) Julio García (1991)
- (Chile) Manuel Espinoza (1991–1993)
- (Chile) Julio García (1993)
- (Chile) Sergio Gutiérrez (1993–1994)
- (Chile) Julio García (1994–1995)
- (Chile) Hugo Cicamois (1995–1996)
- (Chile) Eugenio Horta (1996)
- (Chile) Esaú Bravo (1996)
- (Chile) Pedro Araya (1997)
- (Chile) Roberto Ortiz (1998)
- (Chile) Carlos Encinas (1998)
- (Chile) Manuel Alvarado (1999)
- (Chile) Luis Urrutia (1999)
- (Chile) Eugenio Jara (2000)
- (Chile) John Castro (2000)
- (Chile) Hugo Cicamois (2001)
- (Chile) Enzo Silva (2001)
- (Uruguay) Ramón Castro (2002)
- (Chile) Esaú Bravo (2002–2003)
- (Chile) Alex Barrales (2003)
- (Chile) Jaime Nova (2004–2005)
- (Chile) Eduardo Cortázar (2005-2006)
- (Chile) Nelson Mores (2006)
- (Chile) Germán Cornejo (2007)
- (Chile) Juan Ubilla (2007)
- (Chile) Luis Marcoleta (2008–2010)
- (Chile) Raúl Toro (2010–2011)
- (Chile) Juan Aliaga (2011)
- (Chile) Eduardo Cortázar (2011)
- (Chile) Jorge Socías (2012)
- (Chile) Cristián Castañeda (2012)
- (Chile) Eduardo Cortázar (2012)
- (Argentina) Pablo Abraham (2012–2013)
- (Chile) John Castro (2013)
- (Argentina) Mauricio Giganti (2013)
- (Argentina) Sergio Vargas (2014)
- (Chile) Sebastián Vidal (2014)
- (Argentina) Germán Corengia (2014–2015)
- (Argentina) Cristian Molins (2015)
- (Chile) Luis Marcoleta (2015–2018)
- (Chile) Jaime Vera (2018)
- (Argentina) Dalcio Giovagnoli (2019)
- (Chile) Hugo Vilches (2019)
- (Argentina) Nicolás Larcamón (2020)
- (Chile) Damián Muñoz (2020)
- (Argentina) Martín Palermo (2020–2021)
- (Chile) Damián Muñoz (2021–2023)
- (Chile) Juan José Ribera (2023)
- (Chile) Miguel Riffo (2023)
- (Chile) Francisco Bozan (2024)
- (Chile) Miguel Riffo (2024)
- (Argentina) Héctor Almandoz (2024-
