= 1993 Campeonato Nacional Primera División =

Campeonato Nacional Copa Banco del Estado
- Dates: 10 July 1993 – 9 January 1994
- Champions: Colo-Colo (19th title)
- Relegated: Deportes Concepción; Deportes Iquique
- 1994 Copa Libertadores: Colo-Colo; Unión Española (Liguilla winners)
- 1993 Copa CONMEBOL: Colo-Colo (Play-off winners)
- Matches: 240
- Goals: 587 (2.45 per match)
- Top goalscorer: Marco Figueroa (18 goals)
- Biggest home win: Universidad Católica 8–3 Deportes Antofagasta (21 November)
- Highest attendance: 66,820 Colo-Colo 3–0 Unión Española (2 January)
- Total attendance: 1,813,777
- Average attendance: 7,557

The 1993 Campeonato Nacional, known as Campeonato Nacional Copa Banco del Estado 1993 for sponsorship purposes, was the 61st season of top-flight football in Chile. Colo-Colo won its 19th title following a 3–0 home win against Unión Española on 2 January 1994. Unión Española also qualified for the next Copa Libertadores as Liguilla winners.

== Final table ==
Pos	Team	Pld	W	D	L	GF	GA	GD	Pts	Qualification or relegation
1	Colo-Colo	30	17	10	3	50	21	+29	44	Champions and qualified for the 1994 Copa Libertadores
2	Cobreloa	30	14	12	4	51	38	+13	40	Qualified for the Liguilla Pre-Copa Libertadores
3	Universidad Católica	30	15	7	8	55	35	+20	37	Qualified for the Liguilla Pre-Copa Libertadores
4	Universidad de Chile	30	13	9	8	45	25	+20	35	Qualified for the Liguilla Pre-Copa Libertadores
5	Unión Española	30	13	9	8	49	30	+19	35	Qualified for the Liguilla Pre-Copa Libertadores
6	Deportes Temuco	30	9	14	7	44	29	+15	32	Qualified for the Liguilla Pre-Copa Libertadores
7	O'Higgins	30	12	8	10	37	32	+5	32	Qualified for the Liguilla Pre-Copa Libertadores
8	Deportes Antofagasta	30	9	13	8	35	39	−4	31	
9	Deportes La Serena	30	8	11	11	23	31	−8	27	
10	Everton	30	8	11	11	29	41	−12	27	
11	Provincial Osorno	30	9	8	13	23	33	−10	26	
12	Palestino	30	10	6	14	28	42	−14	26	
13	Coquimbo Unido	30	7	11	12	30	41	−11	25	Promotion/relegation Liguilla
14	Deportes Melipilla	30	6	13	11	34	47	−13	25	Promotion/relegation Liguilla
15	Deportes Concepción	30	3	13	14	23	46	−23	19	Relegated to Segunda División
16	Deportes Iquique	30	7	5	18	31	58	−27	19	Relegated to Segunda División

Source: Solofutbol.cl

Campeonato Nacional de Chile
1993 champion
Colo-Colo
19th title

== Results ==
Home \ Away	DAN	CLO	COL	DCO	COQ	EVE	IQU	DLS	OHI	OSO	PAL	DTE	MEL	UCA	UCH	UES
Antofagasta		1–3	1–0	1–0	3–1	0–0	1–1	1–1	0–0	0–0	1–0	1–2	4–2	1–2	1–1	0–2
Cobreloa	1–1		2–0	4–0	2–0	4–2	1–1	2–2	2–1	4–3	1–1	1–1	2–1	2–1	2–1	2–1
Colo-Colo	1–2	0–0		4–0	3–1	3–1	4–0	2–0	2–1	2–0	2–0	1–1	2–0	1–1	1–1	3–0
Concepción	3–1	0–1	0–2		1–1	2–2	1–0	0–2	0–0	0–0	2–1	1–1	0–1	0–0	0–0	1–3
Coquimbo	0–0	0–0	1–1	0–0		0–1	2–0	0–0	1–2	1–1	2–1	3–2	2–2	1–0	2–0	1–4
Everton	2–2	1–1	1–2	1–0	3–2		3–2	0–0	1–0	0–0	1–1	1–1	2–2	1–0	3–0	2–1
Iquique	3–1	3–1	3–3	1–0	1–2	0–0		3–1	1–2	0–1	2–0	0–4	1–2	2–1	0–0	2–0
La Serena	0–2	1–1	1–1	3–3	0–0	1–0	3–1		1–0	1–0	0–0	1–0	3–1	1–0	0–1	0–1
O'Higgins	1–1	1–1	0–0	1–0	1–1	1–0	5–2	2–0		2–0	1–0	0–2	5–1	4–3	2–1	0–0
Osorno	0–1	4–2	0–1	1–0	0–1	2–1	2–0	0–0	3–0		0–0	1–0	1–1	0–2	1–0	1–0
Palestino	1–0	0–2	0–2	3–2	3–2	2–0	2–0	2–1	1–0	3–0		1–1	1–0	2–1	1–5	0–2
Temuco	1–1	0–0	1–1	1–1	2–0	3–0	4–1	0–0	2–0	3–0	3–0		1–1	1–2	1–1	1–1
Melipilla	1–1	2–4	0–0	1–1	2–0	0–0	1–0	2–0	0–4	2–2	1–1	2–1		1–1	2–3	0–0
U. Católica	8–3	1–1	1–2	2–2	3–2	4–0	5–1	1–0	3–1	2–0	1–0	4–3	2–1		1–1	1–1
U. Chile	0–1	3–1	1–2	6–1	2–0	2–0	4–0	3–1	0–0	2–0	3–0	0–0	1–0	0–1		2–0
U. Española	2–2	5–1	1–2	2–2	1–1	3–0	1–0	3–0	3–0	3–1	3–0	3–1	2–2	0–1	1–1	

Source: Solofutbol.cl
Legend: Blue = home team win; Yellow = draw; Red = away team win.

== Top goalscorers ==
Pos	Name	Team	Goals
1	(Chile) Marco Figueroa	Cobreloa	18
2	(Chile) Mario Araya	Deportes Melipilla	17
2	(Chile) Luka Tudor	Universidad Católica	17

== Liguilla Pre-Copa Libertadores ==
=== Preliminary round ===
Team 1	Agg.	Team 2	1st leg	2nd leg
Universidad de Chile	3–1	Unión Española*	3–0	0–1
Cobreloa	4–3	O'Higgins	1–2	3–1
Universidad Católica	1–2	Deportes Temuco	1–1	0–1

* Qualified as "Best Loser"

18 January 1994	Deportes Temuco	3 – 0	Cobreloa	Estadio Nacional, Santiago
	Morales 27'; Latín 36'; Montecinos 67' (pen.)			Attendance: 33,035; Referee: E. Gamboa

18 January 1994	Universidad de Chile	0 – 0	Unión Española	Estadio Nacional, Santiago
				Attendance: 33,035; Referee: E. Marín

20 January 1994	Unión Española	1 – 0	Cobreloa	Estadio Nacional, Santiago
	M. Fuentes 37'			Attendance: 33,962; Referee: S. Imperatore

20 January 1994	Universidad de Chile	1 – 1	Deportes Temuco	Estadio Nacional, Santiago
	Ibáñez 39'		72' Arancibia	Attendance: 33,962; Referee: H. Silva

23 January 1994	Universidad de Chile	2 – 1	Cobreloa	Estadio Nacional, Santiago
	Beltramo 67'; Abarca 89'		52' Álvarez	Attendance: 10,098; Referee: C. Robles

23 January 1994	Unión Española	1 – 0	Deportes Temuco	San Carlos de Apoquindo, Santiago
	Lucca 58'			Attendance: 11,561; Referee: I. Guerrero

Pos	TEAM	GP	W	D	L	GF	GA	GD	PTS
1	Unión Española	3	2	1	0	2	0	2	5
2	Universidad de Chile	3	1	2	0	3	2	1	4
3	Deportes Temuco	3	1	1	1	4	2	2	3
4	Cobreloa	3	0	0	3	1	6	-5	0

Unión Española qualified for the 1994 Copa Libertadores

== Copa CONMEBOL 1993 play-off ==
=== Preliminary round ===
14 July 1993	Colo-Colo	1 – 1 (4 – 3 p)	Everton	Estadio Nacional, Santiago
	Pizarro 28'		82' Meléndez	Attendance: 12,455; Referee: I. Guerrero
	Penalties
	Biehl (penalty scored); Margas (penalty scored); Vilches (penalty scored); Pizarro (penalty scored); Castillo (penalty missed)		(penalty scored) C. Rojas; (penalty scored) Meléndez; (penalty scored) Núñez; (penalty missed) Kopriva; (penalty missed) I. Herrera

=== Final ===
21 July 1993	Colo-Colo	1 – 1 (5 – 3 p)	Unión Española	Estadio Nacional, Santiago
	Castillo 72'		64' Figueroa	Attendance: 23,480; Referee: H. Silva
	Penalties
	Vega (penalty scored); Biehl (penalty scored); L. Herrera (penalty scored); Vilches (penalty scored); Pizarro (penalty scored)		(penalty scored) Carreño; (penalty scored) Sierra; (penalty scored) Salas; (penalty missed) R. González

Colo-Colo qualified for the 1993 Copa CONMEBOL

== Promotion/relegation Liguilla ==
13 January 1994	Regional Atacama	0 – 0	Melipilla	Estadio Sánchez Rumoroso, Coquimbo

13 January 1994	Coquimbo Unido	2 – 2	Deportes Arica	Estadio Sánchez Rumoroso, Coquimbo
	Araya (pen.); Glaría		Zuñiga; Ortiz

16 January 1994	Regional Atacama	3 – 0	Deportes Arica	Estadio Sánchez Rumoroso, Coquimbo
	Fre

16 January 1994	Coquimbo Unido	2 – 0	Melipilla	Estadio Sánchez Rumoroso, Coquimbo
	Araya; Pajón

18 January 1994	Melipilla	3 – 2	Deportes Arica	Estadio Sánchez Rumoroso, Coquimbo
	Araya		Hurtado; Prieto

18 January 1994	Coquimbo Unido	1 – 1	Regional Atacama	Estadio Sánchez Rumoroso, Coquimbo
	Esparza		Castillo

Pos	TEAM	GP	W	D	L	GF	GA	GD	Pts
1	Regional Atacama	3	1	2	0	4	1	3	4
2	Coquimbo Unido	3	1	2	0	5	3	2	4
3	Melipilla	3	1	1	1	3	4	-1	3
4	Deportes Arica	3	0	1	2	4	8	-4	1

Regional Atacama and Coquimbo Unido play the 1994 Primera División season

== See also ==
- 1993 Copa Chile
