= 1993 Copa Chile =

Tournament details
- Country: Chile
- Teams: 33

Final positions
- Champions: Unión Española
- Runners-up: Cobreloa

Tournament statistics
- Top goal scorer: Cristián Montecinos (15 goals)

The 1993 Copa Chile was the 23rd edition of the Chilean Cup tournament. The competition started on February 20, 1993, and concluded on May 23, 1993. U. Española won the competition for their third time, beating Cobreloa 3–1 on the final. The points system used in the first round of the tournament was; 2 points for the winner but, if the winner team scores 4 or more goals, they won 3 points; in case of a tie, every team took 1 point but, no points for each team if the score were 0–0.

== Calendar ==
Round	Date
First Group Round	20 February 1993; 25 April 1993
Second Group Round	2–18 May 1993
Semi-finals	21 May 1993
Final	23 May 1993

== Group Round ==
Key to colours in group tables
Teams that progressed to the second round

=== Group 1 ===
	DANT	DARI	CSAL	CLOA	DIQU	RATA
D. Antofagasta		4–2	1–1	0–1	0–0	4–2
D. Arica	2–0		0–0	1–2	0–0	1–2
Cobresal	1–1	0–0		1–1	2–3	5–0
Cobreloa	1–1	2–0	0–0		2–0	3–0
D. Iquique	1–0	0–4	1–5	4–3		3–0
R. Atacama	2–2	2–3	2–2	3–0	3–3	

Rank	Team	Points
1	Cobreloa	12
2	Cobresal	10
3	Deportes Antofagasta	10
4	Deportes Iquique	10
5	Deportes Arica	7
6	Regional Atacama	7

=== Group 2 ===
	DLSE	EVER	COQU	SWAN	ULCA	USFE
D. La Serena		1–1	0–0	1–0	5–0	3–0
Everton	3–4		3–0	1–2	5–1	4–0
Coquimbo U.	2–0	2–2		1–0	1–1	1–1
S. Wanderers	1–2	0–2	0–2		3–2	1–0
U. La Calera	2–2	2–2	1–0	1–1		0–0
U. San Felipe	1–4	2–2	1–3	0–2	2–1	

Rank	Team	Points
1	Deportes La Serena	17
2	Everton	14
3	Coquimbo Unido	11
4	Santiago Wanderers	9
5	Unión La Calera	6
6	Unión San Felipe	4

=== Group 3 ===
	UCHI	UESP	MAGA	DCOL	DMEL
U. de Chile		0–0	3–1	2–0	0–0
U. Española	0–2		2–1	3–0	5–0
Magallanes	2–2	0–3		1–1	4–3
D. Colchagua	0–1	0–0	0–0		1–1
D. Melipilla	1–2	2–3	1–1	0–1	

Rank	Team	Points
1	Universidad de Chile	13
2	Unión Española	11
3	Magallanes	9
4	Deportes Colchagua	4
5	Deportes Melipilla	2

==== Intergroup scores (groups 3-4) ====
DMEL	1–3	PALE	5–3
COLO	0–1	UCHI	0–0
MAGA	4–0	AUDI	2–1
UESP	2–3	UCAT	1–0
USCR	1–0	DCOL	0–1

=== Group 4 ===
	COLO	PALE	UCAT	AUDI	USCR
Colo-Colo		1–1	2–1	4–0	6–1
Palestino	0–0		1–0	0–0	0–0
U. Católica	1–4	3–0		3–4	5–1
Audax I.	0–0	2–2	1–1		0–3
U. Santa Cruz	0–1	2–4	1–3	2–3	

Rank	Team	Points
1	Colo-Colo	14
2	Palestino	12
3	Universidad Católica	10
4	Audax Italiano	9
5	Unión Santa Cruz	6

=== Group 5 ===
	OHIG	DCON	ÑUBL	RANG	LSCH
O'Higgins		1–1	2–1	2–0	4–1
D. Concepción	1–1		1–1	2–0	1–0
Ñublense	0–0	1–1		2–0	5–0
Rangers	2–1	1–1	2–1		4–1
Lota S.	0–0	0–3	0–1	1–1	

Rank	Team	Points
1	O'Higgins	12
2	Deportes Concepción	12
3	Ñublense	10
4	Rangers	9
5	Lota Schwager	1

==== Intergroup scores (groups 5-6) ====
RANG	0–0	DPMO	2–0
POSO	1–0	OHIG	5–0
ÑUBL	1–1	FVIA	3–0
DCON	1–1	DTEM	4–0
HUAC	4–0	LSCH	0–1

=== Group 6 ===
	DTEM	HUAC	DPMO	POSO	FVIA
D. Temuco		1–1	1–0	2–0	9–1
Huachipato	1–2		1–1	0–0	2–1
D. Puerto Montt	0–2	2–0		2–1	3–0
P. Osorno	1–1	0–0	2–0		3–1
F. Vial	1–2	2–1	3–0	0–1	

Rank	Team	Points
1	Deportes Temuco	19
2	Huachipato	9
3	Deportes Puerto Montt	9
4	Provincial Osorno	9
5	Fernández Vial	7

== Second Group Round ==
=== Group 1 ===
	EVER	COLO	DLSE	CSAL
Everton		3–2	1–0	3–2
Colo-Colo	4–0		0–1	3–2
D. La Serena	3–5	2–1		1–1
Cobresal	2–1	1–1	0–0	

Rank	Team	Points
1	Everton	9
2	Colo-Colo	6
3	Deportes La Serena	5
4	Cobresal	4

=== Group 2 ===
	UCHI	DTEM	PALE	ÑUBL
U. de Chile		2–1	0–1	6–0
D. Temuco	3–2		1–0	4–0
Palestino	3–4	2–0		4–2
Ñublense	2–4	2–3	0–0	

Rank	Team	Points
1	Universidad de Chile	11
2	Deportes Temuco	9
3	Palestino	7
4	Ñublense	0

=== Group 3 ===
	UESP	HUAC	COQU	DCON
U. Española		1–2	6–0	2–0
Huachipato	0–1		1–2	1–0
Coquimbo U.	1–1	3–2		0–0
D. Concepción	2–2	1–1	2–2	

Rank	Team	Points
1	Unión Española	9
2	Huachipato	6
3	Coquimbo Unido	5
4	Deportes Concepción	3

=== Group 4 ===
	CLOA	DANT	OHIG	UCAT
Cobreloa		1–0	4–1	5–1
D. Antofagasta	1–0		3–1	4–0
O'Higgins	1–0	0–0		3–2
U. Católica	2–3	3–3	1–5	

Rank	Team	Points
1	Cobreloa	10
2	Deportes Antofagasta	8
3	O'Higgins	7
4	Universidad Católica	1

== Semifinals ==
May 21, 1993

Unión Española	4 – 2	Everton
Sierra 43', 76'; J. Sanchez 54'; Vega 72'		Bianchi 70'; Valdir Pereira 89'

Estadio Nacional, Santiago
Attendance: 31,814
Referee: E. Marín

May 21, 1993

Universidad de Chile	0 – 0	Cobreloa
Penalties
Zambrano (penalty scored); Estay (penalty scored); V. Castañeda (penalty scored); Musrri (penalty missed); Puyol (penalty scored)	4 – 5	(penalty scored) Pérez; (penalty scored) P. González; (penalty scored) Jaque; (penalty scored) Figueroa; (penalty scored) Puebla

Estadio Nacional, Santiago
Attendance: 31,814
Referee: H. Silva

== Third place match ==
May 23, 1993

Universidad de Chile	1 – 4	Everton
Beltramo 38' (pen.)		Carreño 31', 69'; Valdir P. 35'; Bianchi 43'

Estadio Nacional, Santiago
Attendance: 12,289
Referee: J. Massardo

== Final ==
May 23, 1993

Unión Española	3 – 1	Cobreloa
Sierra 70'; Vega 86'; J. Sanchez 90'		Jaque 87'

Estadio Nacional, Santiago
Attendance: 12,289
Referee: S. Imperatore

== Top goalscorer ==
- Cristián Montecinos (D. Temuco) 15 goals

== See also ==
- 1993 Campeonato Nacional
- Primera B
