= Víctor Hugo Amatti =

Argentine footballer

Personal information
- Full name: Víctor Hugo Amatti Weinzettel
- Date of birth: 20 June 1965 (age 61)
- Place of birth: Paraná, Argentina
- Height: 1.83 m (6 ft 0 in)
- Position: Defender

Senior career*
| Years | Team | Apps | (Gls) |
| 1980–1983 | Atlético Neuquén Club | | |
| 1985 | Atlético Paraná | | |
| 1986 | Belgrano de Paraná | | |
| 1987 | Lota Schwager | | |
| 1988 | Fernández Vial | | |
| 1988 | Deportes Temuco | | |
| 1989 | Santiago Wanderers | | |
| 1990–1991 | Fernández Vial | | |
| 1992 | Coquimbo Unido | | |
| 1993 | Deportes Iquique | | |
| 1994 | Cipolletti | | |
| 1995 | Santiago Wanderers | | |
| 1997 | Fernández Vial | | |
| 2001 | Atlético Neuquén Club | | |
- * Club domestic league appearances and goals

Víctor Hugo Amatti Weinzettel (born 20 June 1965) is an Argentine former professional footballer who played as a defender.
