= Asociación Coronel Brandsen =

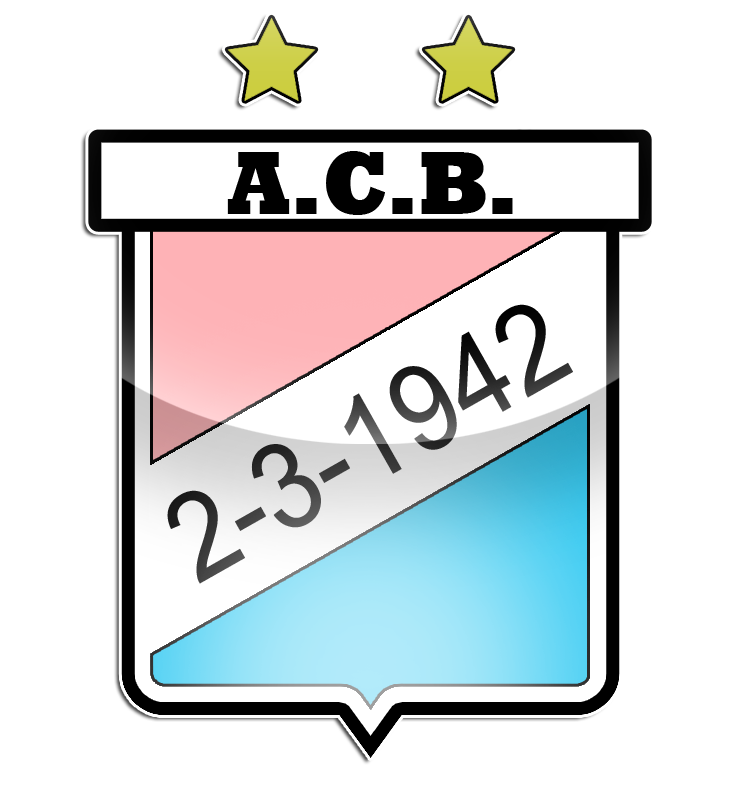
- Full name: Asociación Cultural y Biblioteca Coronel Brandsen de La Plata
- Nicknames: Tricolor, El Coronel.
- Founded: 2 March 1942
- Ground: 'Francisco Antonio "Pancho" Varallo' Stadium
- Chairman: Norberto Sánchez
- Manager: Sergio Miceli
- League: Liga Amateur Platense

The Asociación Coronel Brandsen (ACB) is an Argentinian club that participates in the first division of the Liga Amateur Platense de fútbol. Its center is located near La Plata and its headquarters sits within the urban area of the city, 100 metres from the Square called Plaza Brandsen. The steering committee is chaired by Norberto Sanchez, while the vice-chairman of the institution is Luis Perez.

== Two-times champion 2007/2008 ==
The 60th Street club had been champion of the Liga Amateur Platense on two occasions. The first was in the year 2007 when it had beaten Curuzú Cuatiá on the last match after passionate definition. The following championship had been achieved in the year 2008 in the town of Guernica where it had won 2–1 the last game. In addition to obtain the championship, that achievement concluded in qualifying for the third time in its history to the Torneo Argentino C playing as a local in the stadium of Defensores de Cambaceres. The team to play the tournament in 2008 was captained by Pedro Verde (cousin of who was captain of the Argentina national football team, Juan Sebastián Verón).

== Juan Sebastián Verón ==
On June 29, 2012, Juan Sebastián Verón was presented as a new player of the institution: this created uproar in La Plata. It had been since 1999 when "La Brujita" started to train with the Brandsen team in the neighborhood of El Retiro. There were several reasons that led him to accept the offer to play in the institution that militates in the Liga Amateur Platense. His cousin, Pedro Andrés Verde, was playing at the club. Another who also helped was Hernán Bonvicini, a coach with experience as interim coach in Cambaceres and as assistant of Vasco Azconzábal in Estudiantes de La Plata.

== 2012 Clausura Championship ==
After a fantastic campaign, the group led by Hernan Bonvicini, Juan Sebastián Verón and Pedro Verde, wo the tournament organized by the Amateur League Platense.

On the last day of the competition, a wonderful goal by Veron allowed Brandsen to beat Las Lomas by 1–0 and enshrined in the Amateur League. The team got so a place to play again the "Torneo Argentino C", where its performance was not as expected after losing the initial triangular disputed with the Club Everton and Club Atlético y Progreso de Brandsen, without Veron's participation.

== First-team squad ==
Note: Flags indicate national team as defined under FIFA eligibility rules; some limited exceptions apply. Players may hold more than one non-FIFA nationality.

No.	Pos.	Nation	Player
1	GK	ARG	Franco Vivas
2	DF	ARG	Diego Gagliardo
3	DF	ARG	Alfredo Canseco
4	DF	ARG	Leonardo Oliva
5	DF	URU	Luis Rinaldi
6	MF	ARG	Lautaro Tombesi
7	FW	ARG	Damián Pasalagua
8	MF	ARG	Juan Uranga
9	FW	ARG	Augusto Bidondo
10	MF	ARG	Sebastián Molina
11	MF	ARG	Juan Emiliano Sosa

== Headquarters ==
The headquarters of the club has in its interior a secretariat, where the members of the executive committee and the administrative meets. It also serves members from 17 pm. In turn, there is available to them a soccer field with synthetic grass and a paddle court of the same ground. As well, it has a restaurant, a functional training gym and a pool (for now only usable in the summer) with changing rooms and bathrooms included in excellent conditions. It also possesses two rooms where it is possible to make various events (like birthdays, dance for the 3rd age, etcetera) .

== Disciplines and Services ==
Football

Karate

Professor: Leandro Abadie Pobes. 4º Dan AAGK and FAK.

Taekwondo

Artistic gymnastics

Swimming

Kung Fu

Teatro

Skate

Circus

Futsal and Paddle

"Cambalache" Restaurant

Brandsen's Gym
