= Nelson Acosta =

Uruguayan footballer (born 1944)

Personal information
- Full name: Nelson Bonifacio Acosta López
- Date of birth: 12 June 1944 (age 82)
- Place of birth: Paso de los Toros, Uruguay
- Position: Midfielder

Senior career*
| Years | Team | Apps | (Gls) |
| 1969–1971 | Huracán Buceo | 56 | (3) |
| 1972–1976 | Peñarol | 157 | (6) |
| 1977 | Everton | | |
| 1978–1981 | O'Higgins | | |
| 1982–1984 | Fernández Vial | | |
| 1984 | Lota Schwager | | |

Managerial career
- 1984–1988: Fernández Vial
- 1988–1991: O'Higgins
- 1992: Unión Española
- 1992: Cruz Azul
- 1993–1996: Unión Española
- 1993: Chile (caretaker)
- 1996–2001: Chile
- 2002–2003: Cobreloa
- 2003–2004: Bolivia
- 2004–2005: Cobreloa
- 2005–2007: Chile
- 2007–2010: Everton
- 2011–2012: Cobreloa
- 2012: Deportivo Quito
- 2014: Everton
- 2014–2015: Deportes Iquique
- * Club domestic league appearances and goals

Nelson Bonifacio Acosta López, nicknamed Pelado Acosta (Bald Acosta), (born 12 June 1944 in Paso de los Toros, Uruguay) is a former Uruguayan-born Chilean football manager and footballer. He became a naturalized Chilean citizen in 1984 and managed several football teams. He is now retired.

== Career ==
He managed the national team of Chile from 1996 to 2001, leading them to the 1998 FIFA World Cup despite having only managed club football with no national team experience before taking over the Chile job. He guided Chile to its first World Cup finals appearance after a 16-year absence. Finishing second in Group B behind Italy, Chile reached the Round of 16 for the first time since 1962, losing 4–1 to Brazil at the Parc des Princes. He would soon obtain a fourth place in the 1999 Copa América held in Paraguay and a historic bronze medal in charge of the U-23 team in the Sydney 2000 Olympic Games. His dismal results in the qualifiers for the 2002 World Cup led to his dismissal after 66 official matches at the helm with a home defeat against Argentina (0–2) in 2000, two months after his exploits with the U-23 Olympic team. As well as a poor relationship with then president of the ANFP Mario Mosquera, the Uruguayan-born manager was criticised for his tactical approaches and the call-up of some players.

At the helm of Cobreloa, he won the 2003 Apertura Tournament (after 11 years without a title) and reached the quarterfinals of the Copa Libertadores that same year, eliminated by the eventual holders Boca Juniors.

Acosta took over Bolivia in 2004, but failed miserably and returned to manage Cobreloa winning the 2004 Clausura tournament. From his domestic league success, Acosta was once again appointed as Chile manager replacing Juvenal Olmos in early June 2005. On the 7th July 2007, Acosta resigned from managing the Chile national team immediately after their Copa América quarterfinal elimination, held in Venezuela losing 6–1 to eventual champions Brazil.

In September 2007, he was appointed manager of Corporación Deportiva Everton de Viña del Mar, one of the top regional teams in Chile. On June 3, 2008, he led Everton to their first Chilean League title in 32 years and ended the domestic dominance of Colo-Colo.

In late 2010, he switched to manage Cobreloa, in his second stint in charge and was sacked in April 2012. He returned to Everton de Viña del Mar in January 2014 but left almost 9 months later for his last managerial role at Ecuadorean side Deportivo Quito.

=== Final retirement (2017) ===
In September 2017, it was reported that Nelson Acosta had retired from football after being diagnosed with Alzheimer's disease. According to the report, the diagnosis had been made more than a year earlier, after he experienced several problems at his last club, Deportes Iquique. Later that month, Acosta denied that he had Alzheimer's, stating that he would be fine and would continue coaching without problems.

== Personal life ==
Acosta is a naturalized Chilean by residence.

Before embarking on his coaching career, he owned a boutique clothing store in Concepción what he managed while he played for Lota Schwager.

Since 2016, he suffers from Alzheimer's disease.

== Honours ==
=== Player ===
==== Club ====
Peñarol

- Primera División (3): 1973, 1974, 1975

=== Managerial ===
==== Club ====
Unión Española

- Copa Chile (2): 1992, 1993

Cobreloa

- Primera División de Chile (2): 2003–A, 2004–C

Everton

- Primera División de Chile (1): 2008–A

==== International ====
Chile

- Summer Olympics Tournament Bronze Medal (1): 2000
