= Patricio Lira =

Chilean footballer and manager (born 1979)

Personal information
- Full name: Patricio Andrés Lira Navarrete
- Date of birth: 10 March 1979 (age 47)
- Place of birth: Temuco, Chile
- Height: 1.73 m (5 ft 8 in)
- Position: Midfielder

Youth career
- Deportes Temuco

Senior career*
Years	Team	Apps	(Gls)
1997–1998	Deportes Temuco		
1999–2001	Cobreloa		
2002	Deportes Antofagasta		
2003–2005	Deportes Temuco		
2006–2008	Cobresal		
2009–2010	Ñublense		
2010–2011	Unión Temuco		

Managerial career
- 2012–2016: Deportes Temuco (assistant)
- 2016: Iberia (assistant)
- 2018: Deportes Temuco (youth)
- 2019–2021: Deportes Temuco
- 2022: Fernández Vial
- 2026–: Cobreloa (assistant)
- * Club domestic league appearances and goals

Patricio Andrés Lira Navarrete (born 10 March 1979) is a Chilean football manager and former football midfielder.

== Club career ==
Lira was born in Temuco, Chile. He began his playing career with Deportes Temuco, having also played for Cobresal and Ñublense. He joined Unión Temuco in 2010.

== Managerial career ==
In 2012, Lira began his managerial career as the assistant coach of Carlos Girardengo in Deportes Temuco. In 2019, he took the charge as the head coach of Deportes Temuco after Hugo Vilches was released. In 2022, he became the manager of Fernández Vial.
