= Pedro Jaque =

Chilean footballer

Personal information
- Full name: Pedro Fernando Jaque Gatíca
- Date of birth: 1 October 1963 (age 63)
- Place of birth: Lota, Chile
- Height: 1.77 m (5 ft 10 in)
- Position: Defender

Youth career
- Lota Schwager

Senior career*
Years	Team	Apps	(Gls)
1985–1987	Lota Schwager	20	(0)
1988–1991	Fernández Vial	107	(5)
1992–1994	Cobreloa	60	(0)
1994–1995	Morelia		
1995–1997	Cobreloa	72	(2)
1998–1999	Deportes Concepción	74	(3)
2000	Everton	26	(1)
2001–2002	Coquimbo Unido	51	(0)
2003	Unión La Calera		

International career
1994–1995	Chile	4	(0)
- * Club domestic league appearances and goals

Pedro Fernando Jaque Gatíca (born 1 October 1963) is a Chilean former professional footballer who played as a defender for clubs in Chile and Mexico.

== Club career ==
Born in Lota, Chile, Jaque began his career with Lota Schwager in the second level of the Chilean football, getting promotion to the top division in the 1986 season. After a stint with Fernández Vial (1988–91), he moved to Cobreloa in 1992, with whom he won the 1992 Primera División.

Abroad, Jaque played for Mexican club Morelia in the 1994–95 season, where he coincided with his compatriots Marco Antonio Figueroa, Jaime Vera and Luis Pérez.

In his homeland, he also played for Deportes Concepción, Everton, Coquimbo Unido and Unión La Calera, his last club in 2003.

== International career ==
Jaque made four appearances in friendly matches for the Chile national team from 1994 to 1995.

== Post-retirement ==
Jaque has worked as a football agent, being the representative of players such as Juan Manuel Lucero and Jaime Riveros

In 2010, he served as technical manager of Deportes Temuco.

== Honours ==
Cobreloa

- Chilean Primera División: 1992
