= Eugenio Jara =

Chilean football manager (1935–2014)

Personal information
- Full name: Heber Eugenio Jara Valladares
- Date of birth: 27 December 1935
- Place of birth: Talca, Chile
- Date of death: 21 December 2014 (aged 78)
- Place of death: Santiago, Chile

Senior career*
Years	Team	Apps	(Gls)
- Ferrobadminton
- O'Higgins
- Colchagua

Managerial career
- 1974–1975: Curicó Unido
- 1976: Rangers
- 1978: Ñublense
- 1979: Independiente Cauquenes
- 1980–1982: Magallanes
- 1983: Naval
- 1984: Rangers
- 1985: Magallanes
- 1986: O'Higgins
- 1987: San Luis
- 1987: Chile B
- 1988: Chile U20
- 1988–1989: Palestino
- 1990: Unión San Felipe
- 1990: Sporting Cristal
- 1991–1992: Rangers
- 1993–1995: Unión Santa Cruz
- 1996: Deportes Linares
- 1997: Deportes Arica
- 2000: Curicó Unido
- * Club domestic league appearances and goals

Heber Eugenio Jara Valladares (27 December 1935 – 21 December 2014), known as Eugenio Jara, was a Chilean football manager and footballer.

== Career ==
=== Club ===
Born in Talca, Jara played football for Ferrobadminton, O'Higgins and Colchagua and had a prolific career as football manager in Chile. He is well remembered by leading "Los Comandos" (The Commandos) from Magallanes, how they were nicknamed in the first half of the 1980s and that qualified to the 1985 Copa Libertadores, defeating Uruguayan club Bella Vista in the Estadio Centenario.

In the Chilean Primera División, he also coached Rangers de Talca, Ñublense, Naval, San Luis, Palestino and Unión San Felipe.

In the Chilean Segunda División, he coached Curicó Unido, Independiente de Cauquenes, Deportes Linares, Unión Santa Cruz, O'Higgins, Palestino, Unión San Felipe, Rangers de Talca and Deportes Arica. In 1979, he got the better season of Independiente de Cauquenes in its history, with the well remembered Brazilian striker Ribamar Batista in the squad.

In addition, in 2000 he had a stint with Curicó Unido in the Tercera A.

Abroad, he was the manager of Peruvian club Sporting Cristal in the 1990 Torneo Descentralizado for three months. In that club, he coincided with his compatriots Quemel Farías and Carlos González as players.

=== National team ===
In 1987, he led the Chile national team in the Pan American Games, winning the silver medal. In addition, he got the first win of Chile against Argentina in an official match after defeating by 3–2 in the semi-finals.

In 1988, he coached Chile U20 in the South American Championship.

== Personal life ==
Jara died at the age of 78, after suffering the Alzheimer's disease.

== Honours ==
Chile B

- Pan American Games Silver medal: 1987
