= Pedro Lucio Olivera =

Argentine football player and manager

Personal information
- Full name: Pedro Lucio Olivera
- Date of birth: 21 February 1953 (age 73)
- Place of birth: San Juan, Argentina
- Position: Goalkeeper

Senior career*
Years	Team	Apps	(Gls)
- Deportivo San Juan
- Los Andes SJ
1970–1972	Desamparados		
1973	Chacarita Juniors		
1978–1979	Santiago Morning	60	(0)
1980	Unión Española	13	(0)
1981	O'Higgins	15	(0)
1982	Regional Atacama	0	(0)

Managerial career
- 1995: Fernández Vial
- Universidad de Belgrano
- 2001–2002: Fernández Vial
- * Club domestic league appearances and goals

Pedro Lucio Olivera (born 21 February 1953) is an Argentine former football goalkeeper and manager.

== Playing career ==
Born in San Juan, Argentina, Olivera played for local clubs Deportivo San Juan, Los Andes and Desamparados in his homeland. He also played for Chacarita Juniors.

Moving to Chile, Olivera spent seasons with Santiago Morning (1978–79), Unión Española (1980), O'Higgins (1981) and Regional Atacama (1982) in the top division.

== Coaching career ==
Olivera led Chilean club Fernández Vial twice in 1995 and 2001–02. In 1995, he made possible the signing of his close friend and historical Argentine international forward, Mario Kempes, then retired.

In his homeland, he has also worked as coach for the former professional footballers' trade union and the Universidad de Belgrano.
