= Gustavo Poirrier =

Chilean footballer

Personal information
- Full name: Gustavo Eduardo Poirrier Silva
- Date of birth: 27 May 1964
- Place of birth: Valparaíso, Chile
- Date of death: 4 January 2003 (aged 38)
- Place of death: Queens, New York, United States
- Position: Attacking midfielder

Youth career
- Deportes Recreo
- Orompello
- Santiago Wanderers

Senior career*
Years	Team	Apps	(Gls)
1982–1990	Santiago Wanderers	150	(9)
1991	Unión Española	6	(1)
1992–1997	Deportes Temuco	142	(13)
1998	Deportes Concepción	26	(0)
1999	Deportes Puerto Montt	16	(0)
2001–2003	Chilean New York	–	(–)

International career
1996	Chile	2	(0)

Managerial career
- 2001–2003: Colo-Colo NY
- * Club domestic league appearances and goals

Gustavo Eduardo Poirrier Silva (born 27 May 1964 – 4 January 2003) was a Chilean football player who played as an attacking midfielder.

== Early years ==
Born in Valparaíso, Chile, Poirrier was with clubs Deportes Recreo and Orompello before joining the Santiago Wanderers youth ranks. He made his professional debut in the 2–0 home victory against Lota Schwager in the 1982 Segunda División on 16 January 1983. They got promotion to the Primera División in the same season. Relegated to the Segunda División again, Poirrier helped them to return to the top division in the 1989 season.

Following Santiago Wanderers, Poirrier joined Unión Española for the 1991 Primera División and switched to Deportes Temuco the next season. He spent 6 six years with them, becoming a historical player.

Poirrier ended his career with Deportes Concepción and Deportes Puerto Montt in 1998 and 1999, respectively.

Following his retirement, Poirrier emigrated to New York in 2001 and represented an amateur club made up by Chilean immigrants called Chilean New York.

== International career ==
Poirrier earned two caps for the Chile national team under Xabier Azkargorta in 1996.

== Coaching career ==
Settled in the United States, Poirrier served as coach for a Colo-Colo academy based in New York.
