= Ricardo Ortiz (footballer) =

Uruguayan football player and manager

Personal information
- Full name: Ricardo Alberto Ortiz Pérez
- Date of birth: 6 February 1957 (age 69)
- Place of birth: Montevideo, Uruguay
- Position: Defensive midfielder

Youth career
- Los Piratas
- Náutico Montevideo
- 1969–1970: Defensor

Senior career*
| Years | Team | Apps | (Gls) |
| 1971–1980 | Defensor | | |
| 1981–1982 | Peñarol | | |
| 1983–1984 | Deportes Tolima | 51 | (0) |
| 1985 | Defensor | | |
| 1986 | Bella Vista | | |

International career
| 1974–1975 | Uruguay U20 | | |
| 1975–1980 | Uruguay | 4 | (0) |

Managerial career
- 1988–1989: Peñarol
- 1990: El Tanque Sisley
- 1991–1992: Peñarol
- 1992: Racing Montevideo
- 1994: Fénix
- 1996–1997: Defensor Sporting
- 1999: Cobresal
- 2000: Fernández Vial
- 2001: Santiago Morning
- 2001: River Plate Montevideo
- 2002: Defensor Sporting
- 2003: Universitario
- 2004: Deportivo Maldonado
- 2004: Municipal Limeño
- 2005: Universidad
- 2005: Real España
- 2006: Cerrito
- 2006–2007: Vida
- 2007–2008: Fernández Vial
- 2009–2010: Victoria
- 2011: Cerro
- 2012–2013: Cerro
- 2015: Platense FC
- 2016: Atenas
- 2018: Atenas
- 2022: Central Español
- * Club domestic league appearances and goals

Ricardo Alberto Ortiz Pérez (born 6 February 1957) is a Uruguayan former football defensive midfielder and manager.

== Playing career ==
Born in Montevideo, Uruguay, Ortiz was with five-a-side football club Los Piratas and Náutico under Juan Alberto Schiaffino before joining the Defensor youth ranks. He made his senior debut at the age of 14 and later won the 1976 Campeonato Uruguayo Primera División, the first league title for the club.

As a player of Uruguayan giant Peñarol, Ortiz won the Uruguayan Primera División twice in 1981 and 1982, the 1982 Copa Libertadores and the 1982 Intercontinental Cup.

Abroad, Ortiz stood out with Colombian club Deportes Tolima in 1983–84.

At international level, Ortiz represented Uruguay at under-20 level in the 1974 and the 1975 South American Championships, winning the second one, and made four appearances at senior level between 1975 and 1980.

== Coaching career ==
As a football manager, Ortiz has developed his career in Uruguay, Chile, Peru, El Salvador and Honduras. In his homeland, he has led clubs such as Peñarol, El Tanque Sisley, Racing Club de Montevideo, Defensor Sporting, Cerro, Atenas de San Carlos, among others.

In Chile, Ortiz coached Cobresal, Fernández Vial twice and Santiago Morning. In Peru, he led giant Universitario in 2003.

In 2004, Ortiz led Salvadoran club Municipal Limeño. In Honduras, he led Universidad, Real España, Vida, Victoria and Platense.
