= Nicolás Rivera =

Chilean footballer

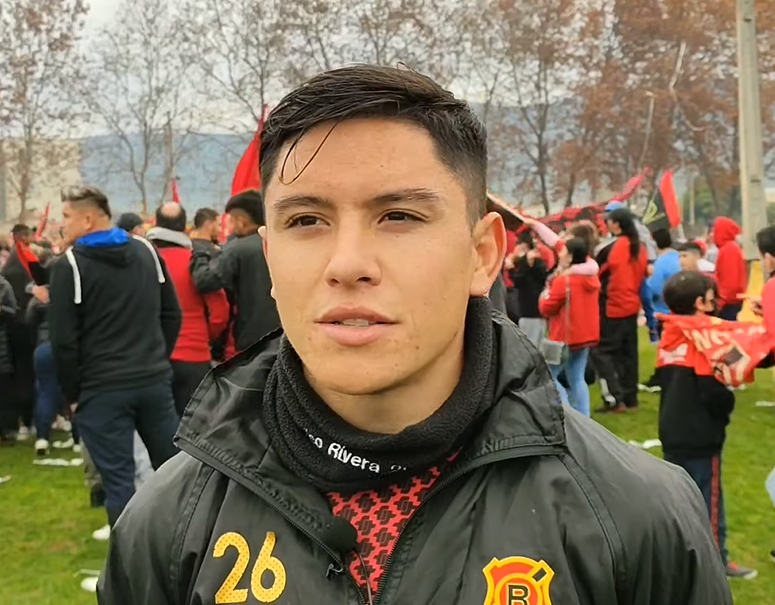
- Rivera in 2022.

Personal information
- Full name: Nicolás Andrés Rivera Faúndez
- Date of birth: 27 June 1998 (age 28)
- Place of birth: Pelarco, Chile
- Height: 1.62 m (5 ft 4 in)
- Position: Left winger

Team information
- Current team: Deportes Temuco
- Number: 16

Youth career
- 2013–2015: Rangers

Senior career*
Years	Team	Apps	(Gls)
2015–2022	Rangers	131	(11)
2023	Coquimbo Unido	24	(2)
2024	Magallanes	20	(0)
2025	Deportes Santa Cruz	28	(3)
2026–	Deportes Temuco	0	(0)
- * Club domestic league appearances and goals as of 31 December 2025

Nicolás Andrés Rivera Faúndez (born 27 June 1998) is a Chilean footballer who plays as a left winger for Deportes Temuco.

== Club career ==
Born in Pelarco, Chile, Rivera is a product of Rangers de Talca. He made his professional debut in the 1–1 away draw against Deportes Copiapó in the 2014–15 season, aged 16, and reached 100 official matches with them in June 2021. He spent eight seasons with Rangers until 2022.

In 2023, Rivera signed with Coquimbo Unido in the Chilean Primera División. The next year, he switched to Magallanes.

In January 2025, Rivera joined Deportes Santa Cruz. On 30 December, he signed with Deportes Temuco.
