= Juan Sebastián Verón =

Argentine footballer and club president

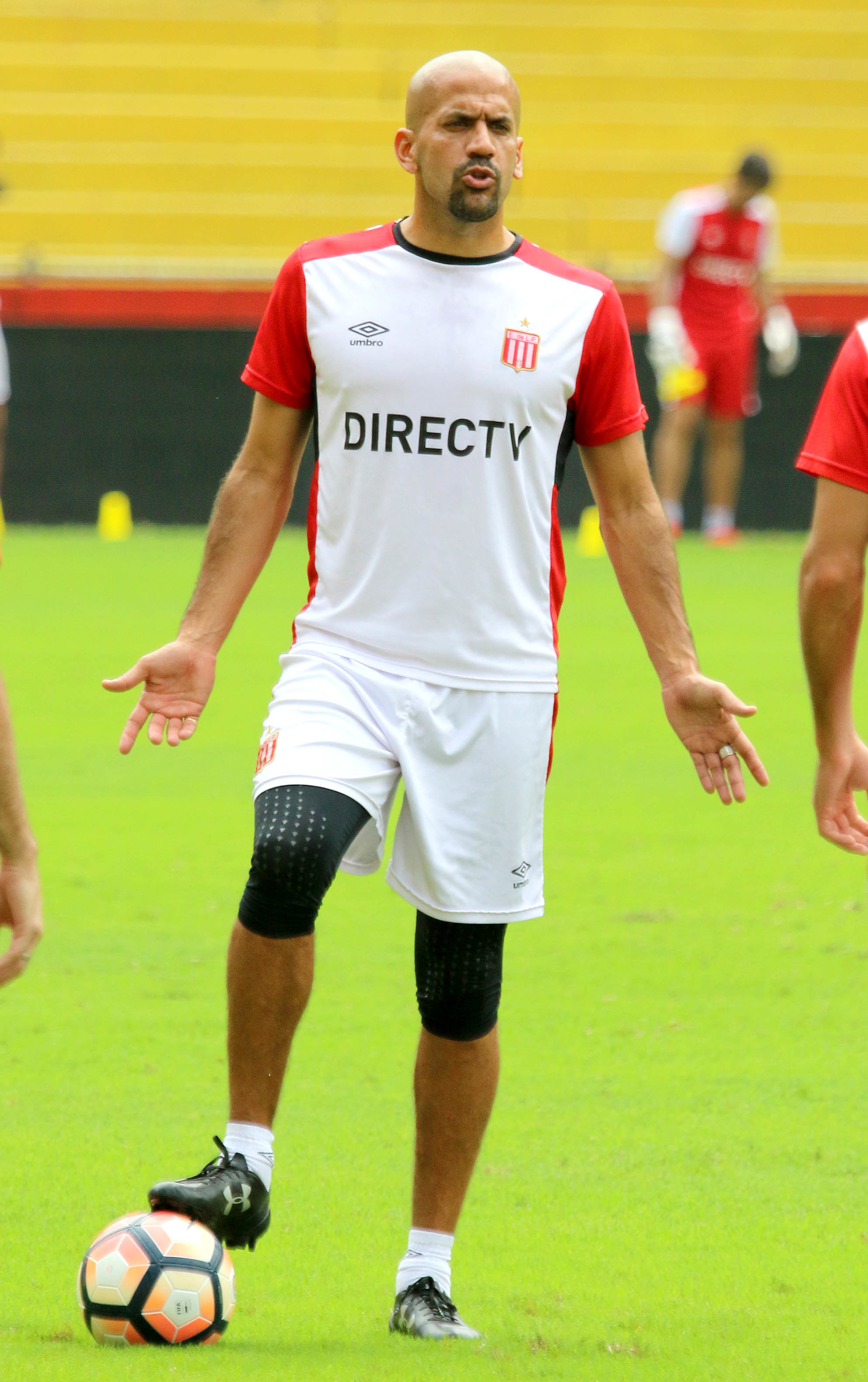
- Verón with Estudiantes de La Plata in 2017

Personal information
- Birth name: Juan Sebastián Verón
- Date of birth: 9 March 1975 (age 51)
- Place of birth: La Plata, Argentina
- Height: 1.86 m (6 ft 1 in)
- Position: Midfielder

Youth career
- 1993–1994: Estudiantes LP

Senior career*
Years	Team	Apps	(Gls)
1994–1996	Estudiantes LP	60	(7)
1996	Boca Juniors	17	(4)
1996–1998	Sampdoria	61	(7)
1998–1999	Parma	26	(1)
1999–2001	Lazio	53	(11)
2001–2003	Manchester United	51	(7)
2003–2007	Chelsea	7	(1)
2004–2006	→ Inter Milan (loan)	49	(3)
2006–2007	→ Estudiantes LP (loan)	30	(2)
2007–2012	Estudiantes LP	107	(18)
2012	Brandsen	28	(7)
2013–2014	Estudiantes LP	21	(0)
2016	Estrella Berisso	1	(1)
2017	Estudiantes LP	0	(0)
Total		511	(73)

International career
1996–2010	Argentina	72	(9)
- * Club domestic league appearances and goals

Juan Sebastián Verón (born 9 March 1975) is an Argentine former professional footballer and current chairman of Estudiantes de La Plata, where he had served as Director of Sports. In 2004, Verón was included in the FIFA 100 list of the 125 greatest living footballers, selected by Pelé as part of FIFA's centenary celebrations. Verón has both Argentine and Italian citizenship. His nickname is "La Brujita" [la βɾuˈxita] (The Little Witch), a nod to his father Juan Ramón who was known as "La Bruja" (The Witch) and was also a championship winning player with Estudiantes.

A midfielder, Verón's career started in Estudiantes, continued in Argentina's Boca Juniors, and included stints in several clubs in the Italian Serie A (where he won the Scudetto with Lazio and with Inter Milan, and a UEFA Cup with Parma), and England's Manchester United and Chelsea. In 2006, he returned to Estudiantes, where he remained until his retirement in 2014, aside from a brief spell with Brandsen. He announced his short return to first team football would occur in the 2017 Copa Libertadores.

At international level, Verón obtained 72 caps for Argentina between 1996 and 2010, scoring nine goals. He represented his nation at three FIFA World Cups, and 2007 Copa América.

== Club career ==
=== Estudiantes ===
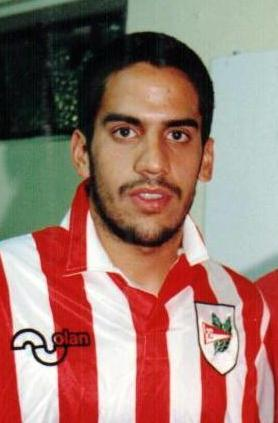
Verón with Estudiantes in 1995

In 1993, Verón signed for Estudiantes de La Plata and in 1995 helped the team to return to the Argentine Primera División. In 1996, he joined Boca Juniors, playing 17 games and scoring four goals, alongside Diego Maradona. He made his international debut for Argentina against Poland in the same year. Sven-Göran Eriksson signed him for Sampdoria shortly afterwards.

=== Italian triumphs and passport controversy ===
In 1998, after playing for Argentina at the 1998 World Cup, he signed for Parma for £15 million. Under Alberto Malesani, Verón operated as the advanced playmaker in a 3–4–1–2 formation behind the strike partnership of Enrico Chiesa and Hernán Crespo, with the freedom to roam across the attacking midfield line. He earned praise in the media for his creativity and influence on the side, with the team's play revolving around his flair. Parma went on to win the Coppa Italia and the UEFA Cup, with Verón playing an important role in both successes. Despite his success in the advanced role, reports at the time of his departure noted that Verón preferred to operate as an outright midfielder rather than remain in the position behind the strikers favoured by Malesani.

Sven-Göran Eriksson then signed him again, this time for Lazio in an £18.1 million deal, with Verón reportedly netting a weekly wage of £48,000. At Lazio, Eriksson used Verón in a fluid playmaking role that often saw him operate from deeper midfield positions, orchestrating the team's play while retaining considerable freedom to roam across midfield and move into more advanced areas behind the forwards. Verón later described Eriksson as the manager who understood him best and said that the freedom he was afforded allowed him to produce his best football. He made his debut for Lazio in the Italian side's 1–0 victory over Manchester United in the European Super Cup in Monaco. In 2000, Verón was described as the driving force behind Lazio as they captured the Scudetto, the Coppa Italia and the Italian Super Cup. During the 1999–2000 Serie A season, he scored eight league goals, a career-best return in the competition.

But in February 2000, he was under investigation by Italian police for a possible fake Italian passport in order to avoid the non-EU quota. The charge was cleared by FIGC in June 2001, because his passport really had been issued by Italian officials and he avoided a ban. However, a new controversy was exposed that Verón and his agent may have used fake documents submitted to the Italian government in order to allege to the government that Verón had Italian descent and grant him an Italian passport, which claimed an Italian, Giuseppe Antonio Porcella was Verón's great-grandfather Ireneo Portela. Manchester United even inserted a clause in the transfer document for a possible ban. In July 2002, he was called to appear before Italy's state prosecutor to answer allegations he illegally acquired an Italian passport. Elena Tedaldi, the agent who helped Verón to get the passport, was jailed for 15 months, but Verón himself and former Lazio chairman Sergio Cragnotti were acquitted in 2007. It is because Verón also had Italian descent through another great-grandparent and it was Tedaldi who used the fake documents.

=== Spell in England ===
After the 2000–01 season, he moved from Lazio to Manchester United on 12 July for a fee of £28.1 million on a five-year deal, the most expensive transfer in English football at that time, also becoming the first non-UEFA player to break the English transfer record. On signing for Manchester United, he was quoted as saying that he had no fear of the Premier League.

Verón's first season at Old Trafford started well. In September 2001, he found the back of the net in three of Manchester United's four outings, including a goal and an assist in a 5–3 comeback win at Tottenham Hotspur, which ultimately led to him being awarded the Premier League Player of the Month. But as the season progressed and fatigue settled in, his performances declined. He would have trouble adapting to the relentlessly faster pace of the Premier League, where he was not allowed the same space and time on the ball.

There was plenty of pressure on him at the start of his second season at Old Trafford and his performances did improve considerably, especially in the Champions League, where he excelled due to the slower tempo of the matches, scoring four goals, and was at the heart of United's successes in the group stages. However, injury meant that he missed much of the end of the season. Questions over his performance led to an expletive-laden tirade against the media by manager Sir Alex Ferguson in support of Verón: "[Verón] is a fucking great player" were his parting words. "And you're all fucking idiots." However, fans and pundits alike agreed that the signing was an expensive flop. Verón later commented that the reason for his fitness problems and struggles with injuries at Manchester United were due to the less intense summer pre-season training in England.

When Chelsea paid £15 million for him two years on, following the arrival of Roman Abramovich, Verón claimed that he wanted to stay and fight for his place at Old Trafford, but Ferguson was willing to let Chelsea talk to him and he was eventually convinced by then Chelsea manager Claudio Ranieri to make the move to Stamford Bridge. His transfer fee to Chelsea was about half that of his record-breaking transfer of just two years before.

Verón made an excellent start to his Chelsea career by scoring the opening goal in a 2–1 victory over Liverpool at Anfield, but he fell away with injury problems as the 2003–04 season progressed and made only 15 appearances for Chelsea.

The Times listed Verón's transfers to Manchester United and Chelsea among the 50 worst transfers ever in Premier League history.

=== Return to Italy ===
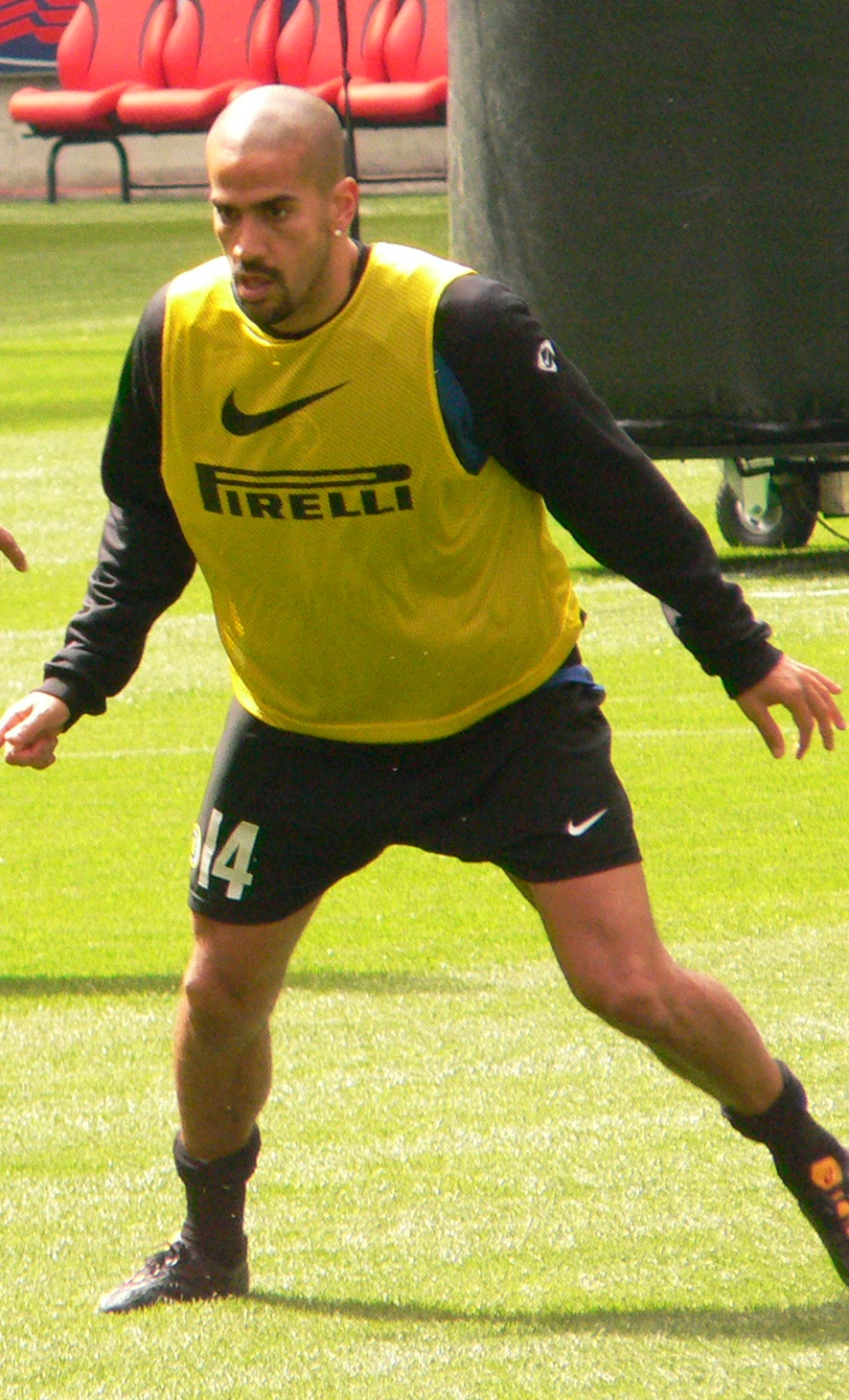
Verón in training with Inter Milan, 2005

When José Mourinho took over as Chelsea manager the following season, Verón was loaned out to Inter Milan initially for 2004–05, but he subsequently returned to Inter on loan for a further season. With Inter, he was part of the squad that won the 2005 Coppa Italia, 2006 Coppa Italia, 2005 Supercoppa Italiana and also by default the 2006 Serie A title after Juventus were stripped of the title for a match fixing scandal.

=== Returning home ===
In mid-2006, Verón made it known that he wished to return to his native Argentina for the 2006–07 season. He received offers from Boca Juniors and River Plate, but chose his boyhood club Estudiantes, of whom he is a declared fan and has made significant donations in the past to upgrade the club training facilities. Chelsea agreed to loan Verón to Estudiantes for a season, until the end of his contract with the English club. On 13 December 2006, he helped Estudiantes win the Apertura 2006 tournament, its first in 23 years, in a final play-off match final over Boca Juniors. Some rival fans booed him, arguably dating back to his sub-par performances during the 2002 FIFA World Cup, but Verón was ranked among the top three players in the 2006 Argentine League by sports newspaper Olé.

Following his donations to the club's training grounds, Verón was a decisive factor in the agreement with La Plata city hall to update Estudiantes' historic stadium to modern standards. Verón personally engaged then Argentine president Néstor Kirchner to kick-start the negotiations, which had been stalled by La Plata mayor Julio Alak. Verón indicated that he may run for Estudiantes president in the future.

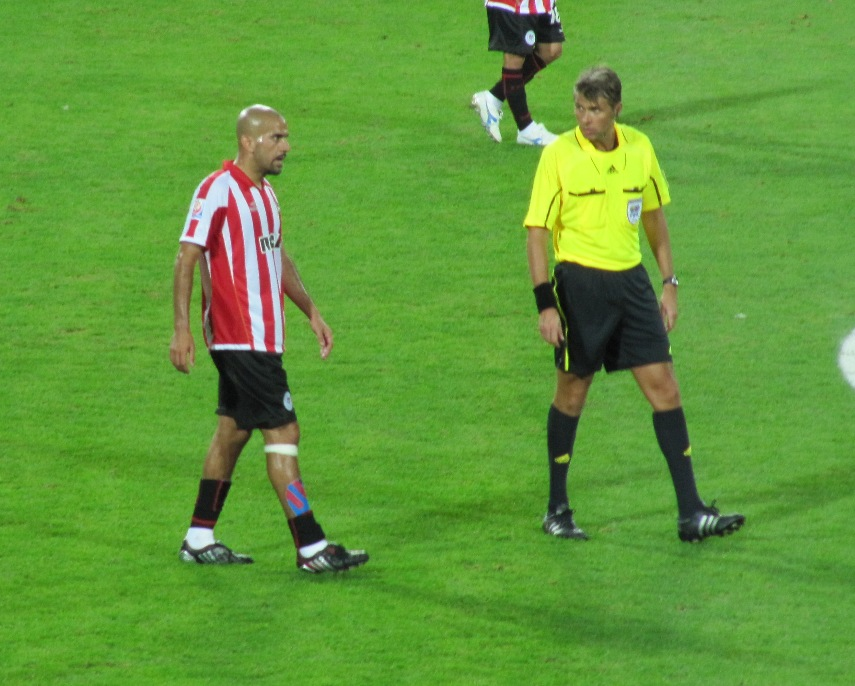
Verón (left) and referee Roberto Rosetti during the 2009 FIFA Club World Cup

In July 2007, Kevin Payne, president of Major League Soccer club D.C. United, met with Verón in Buenos Aires to discuss a possible transfer, but Verón decided to stay in Estudiantes. Verón suffered from a string of minor injuries after his return from the 2007 Copa América, and missed a number of important games during the 2007–08 season. In early 2008, several football personalities chose Verón as the best player in the Argentine league.

Verón's fitness improved in time for the 2008–09 season, in which Estudiantes reached the finals of the Copa Sudamericana and secured a place in the 2009 Copa Libertadores. In 2009, he played in the Copa Libertadores for the second time, having seen Estudiantes eliminated in the round of 16 in the previous year by eventual champions Liga de Quito. After displaying his usual excellent level of play throughout the tournament, he found himself leading Estudiantes into the final for the first time since 1971. The Copa Libertadores has long been a special competition for Estudiantes and its fans, ever since the team won three consecutive titles from 1968 to 1970 with Verón's father playing a key role on the left wing. Verón certainly shared this affinity for the most prestigious title in the American continent, as evidenced by his declaration before the final: "I would trade everything I've won for this title." His dream came true as Estudiantes won the final, after an aggregate of 2–1. A 0–0 tie in La Plata and a dramatic 2–1 win away in Belo Horizonte against Brazil's Cruzeiro sealed el pincha's triumph. Verón was chosen by visitors to fifa.com as the best player of the 2009 Copa Libertadores.

Verón was twice elected South American Footballer of the Year (2008 and 2009) by Uruguayan newspaper El País, a title that is cited worldwide.

In 2012, he played for Asociación Coronel Brandsen in Liga Amateur Platense.

=== Returning from retirement ===
In 2016, he played for Estrella de Berisso, of Liga Amateur Platense.

In December 2016, Verón returned to professional football, signing an 18-month contract to play for Estudiantes in the 2017 Copa Libertadores. Verón had vowed to return if fans bought 65% of the boxes at the club's new stadium, and fulfilled that promise by signing an 18-month contract; he would be given a minimum salary that would go directly back to the club for everyday operations. He made his first appearance for the club since coming out of retirement in a 1–0 friendly victory over Bahia in the Florida Cup, in Orlando, on 15 January 2017, playing the first half, before being substituted.

== International career ==
Verón was called up for the 1998 FIFA World Cup in France, where Argentina was eliminated by the Netherlands in the quarter-finals following a 2–1 defeat; during the match, Verón set-up Claudio López's goal. A rumour (never confirmed) that Verón had failed an internal doping test, and allegations of laziness hampered his relationship with the media and fans. He was called up again for the 2002 World Cup in South Korea/Japan, where Verón was regarded as a key player and captained the side in place of the injured Roberto Ayala. Some fans held him personally responsible for Argentina's dismal performance, which included a loss to England and elimination in the group phase.

After then-national coach José Pekerman omitted him from the 2006 World Cup squad, his replacement, Alfio Basile recalled Verón to the national squad in February 2007, based on his performance in Estudiantes's 2006 championship team. Verón was a starter in the Argentine team that reached the final of 2007 Copa América. Due to injuries and Estudiantes's busy schedule, Verón did not feature in the immediate plans of national coach Diego Maradona, but was recalled to the Argentine squad as a second-half substitute in the 4–0 win over Venezuela on 28 March 2009, Maradona's first competitive game in charge of the national team. He also played in the starting XI in a 2010 FIFA World Cup qualifier against Colombia on 6 June 2009 and was selected by manager Diego Maradona in the final 23-man squad for the finals of the 2010 FIFA World Cup.

Verón started Argentina's first group match against Nigeria, and provided the assist for Gabriel Heinze's goal. After missing the match against South Korea due to injury, Verón returned to the starting line-up against Greece and played the full 90 minutes as Argentina won 2–0. He came on as a substitute for Carlos Tévez in the 69th minute in Argentina's 3–1 victory over Mexico in the Round of 16, but did not feature during the quarterfinal loss to Germany.

On 26 August 2010, Verón retired from international football. Nevertheless, Verón appeared again for Argentina in the 2011 Superclásico de las Américas, a two legged, non-FIFA sanctioned exhibition, between Argentina and Brazil's domestically based players.

== Post-playing career ==
In December 2012, Verón returned to Estudiantes to work as Director of Sports of the institution. In a press conference, club president Enrique Lombardi stated that Verón would not receive any remuneration for his work at the club.

=== President of Estudiantes de La Plata ===
In October 2014, five months after retiring, he was elected president of Estudiantes de La Plata with 75% of the vote. He was re-elected in 2017 for a second three-year term. His presidency oversaw key institutional milestones, including the inauguration of the club's new stadium, Estadio Jorge Luis Hirschi.

After serving as vice-president during the club's 2023 Copa Argentina triumph, he was once again elected president in April 2024. One month into his new term, Estudiantes won the Copa de la Liga Profesional. In November 2025, following a disputed "guard of honour" incident involving newly crowned champions Rosario Central, he was suspended for six months from all official duties by the Argentine Football Association.

== Personal life ==
Verón is the eldest son of Argentina striker Juan Ramón Verón, who scored against Manchester United for Estudiantes at Old Trafford in the 1968 Intercontinental Cup. He was born the day his father played a derby for Estudiantes against cross-town rivals Gimnasia y Esgrima. As a boy, Verón dreamed of playing for English club Sheffield United, as his uncle, Pedro Verde, played for the club at the time. When his son started to play professionally, his father tried to persuade one of his former clubs, Panathinaikos, to sign him. However, after a short trial with them, they finally decided that he was not good enough for their team. After his transfer to Manchester United, Verón said, "So there I was hoping to play for Sheffield United and here I am at Manchester United!"

His son, Deian, is a professional footballer. His brother, Iani, also played football.

== Style of play ==
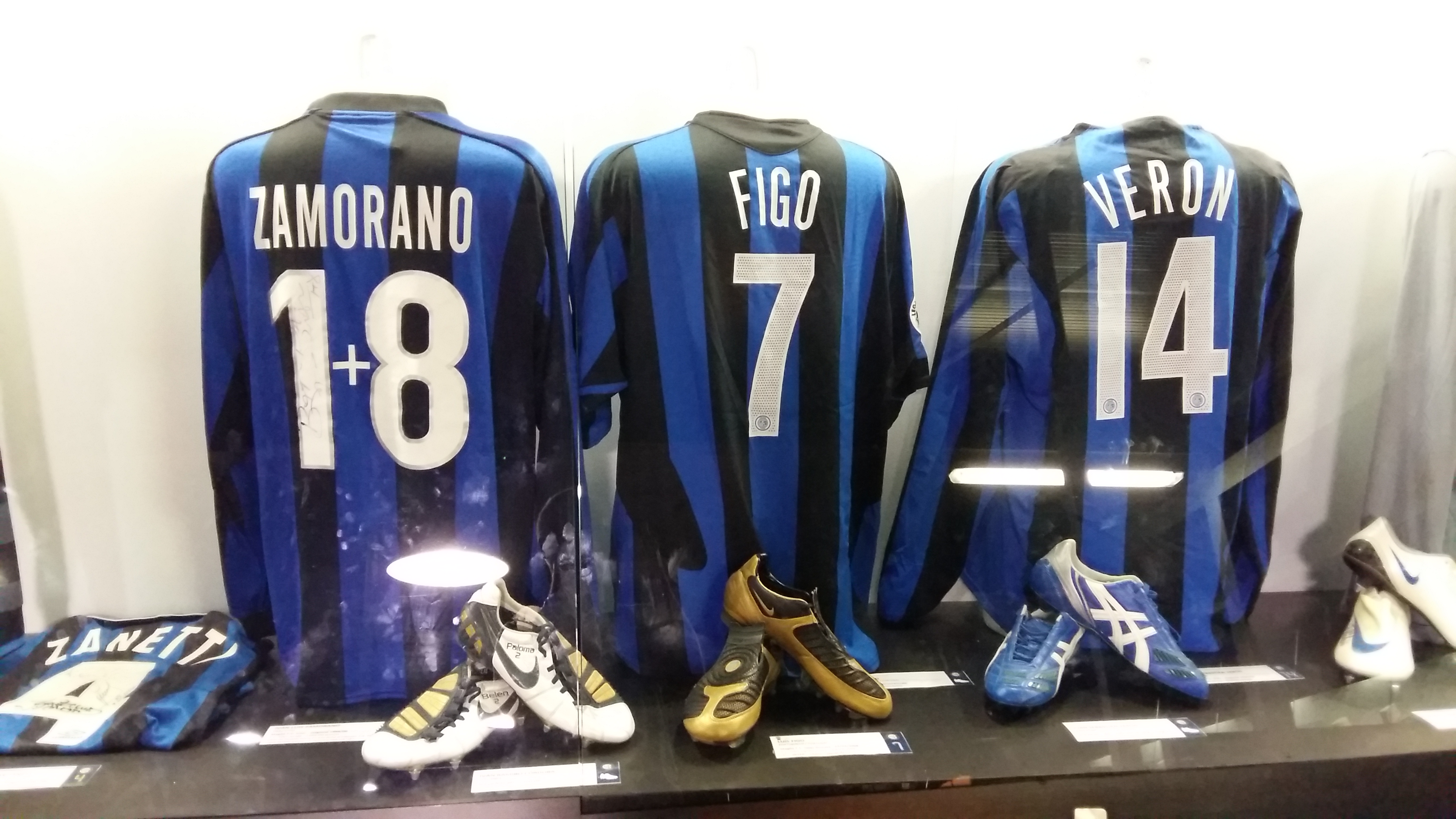
Verón's Inter jersey next to Zanetti's, Zamorano's and Figo's in the San Siro museum

Verón is considered by pundits to have been one of the most proficient midfielders of his generation, as well as one of best playmakers in the world in his prime. Verón was a versatile midfielder who usually functioned as a playmaker; he was capable of playing both as an attacking midfielder and in the centre, or even just in front of the defensive line, as a deep-lying playmaker, due to his awareness, ability to read the game, tackle and dictate the tempo of his team's play or orchestrate his team's attacking moves from deeper positions with his passing after winning back the ball, in addition to providing assists and creating goalscoring opportunities for teammates. He could also get forward and score goals and often functioned in a free role in midfield. He was a physical player known for his pace, vision, passing range and a powerful shot from distance with either foot. During his time at Parma, he was also used in a more advanced role as a second striker on occasion. He was also an accurate set-piece taker, known for his powerful, bending free kicks with his right foot.

== Career statistics ==
=== Club ===
Appearances and goals by club, season and competition
Club	Season	League			National cup (Note: Includes Coppa Italia, FA Cup)		League cup (Note: Includes Football League Cup)		Continental		Other		Total	
Club	Season	Division	Apps	Goals	Apps	Goals	Apps	Goals	Apps	Goals	Apps	Goals	Apps	Goals
Estudiantes	1993–94	Primera División	7	0	—		—		1	0	—		8	0
Estudiantes	1994–95	Primera B Nacional	38	5	—		—		3	1	—		41	6
Estudiantes	1995–96	Primera División	15	2	—		—		1	0	—		16	2
Estudiantes	Total		60	7	0	0	0	0	5	1	0	0	65	8
Boca Juniors	1995–96	Primera División	17	4	—		—		0	0	—		17	4
Sampdoria	1996–97	Serie A	32	5	2	0	—		—		—		34	5
Sampdoria	1997–98	Serie A	29	2	3	0	—		2 (Note: Appearances in UEFA Cup)	0	—		34	2
Sampdoria	Total		61	7	5	0	0	0	2	0	0	0	68	7
Parma	1998–99	Serie A	26	1	6	3	—		10	0	—		42	4
Lazio	1999–2000	Serie A	31	8	4	0	—		11 (Note: Appearance in UEFA Champions League)	2	1 (Note: Appearance in UEFA Super Cup)	0	47	10
Lazio	2000–01	Serie A	22	3	2	0	—		7	1	1 (Note: Appearance in Supercoppa Italiana)	0	32	4
Lazio	Total		53	11	6	0	0	0	18	3	2	0	79	14
Manchester United	2001–02	Premier League	26	5	1	0	0	0	13	0	—		40	5
Manchester United	2002–03	Premier League	25	2	1	0	5	0	11	4	—		42	6
Manchester United	Total		51	7	2	0	5	0	24	4	0	0	82	11
Chelsea	2003–04	Premier League	7	1	0	0	1	0	6	0	—		14	1
Internazionale (loan)	2004–05	Serie A	24	3	5	0	—		10	0	—		39	3
Internazionale (loan)	2005–06	Serie A	25	0	0	0	—		9	0	1	1	35	1
Internazionale (loan)	Total		49	3	5	0	0	0	19	0	1	1	74	4
Estudiantes (loan)	2006–07	Primera División	30	2	—		—		—		—		30	2
Estudiantes	2007–08	Primera División	18	7	—		—		8	2	—		26	9
Estudiantes	2008–09	Primera División	18	3	—		—		24	2	—		42	5
Estudiantes	2009–10	Primera División	27	4	—		—		9	1	2 (Note: Appearances in FIFA Club World Cup)	0	38	5
Estudiantes	2010–11	Primera División	24	2	—		—		6	0	2 (Note: Appearances in Recopa Sudamericana)	0	32	2
Estudiantes	2011–12	Primera División	20	2	—		—		1	0	—		21	2
Estudiantes	2013–14	Primera División	22	0	—		—		—		—		22	0
Estudiantes	2016–17	Primera División	0	0	—		—		5	0	—		5	0
Estudiantes total			219	27	0	0	0	0	58	6	4	0	281	33
Career total			483	61	24	3	6	0	137	13	7	1	657	78

=== International ===
Appearances and goals by national team and year
National team	Year	Apps	Goals
Argentina	1996	1	0
Argentina	1997	8	1
Argentina	1998	13	0
Argentina	1999	4	1
Argentina	2000	10	3
Argentina	2001	8	2
Argentina	2002	6	1
Argentina	2003	5	1
Argentina	2004	0	0
Argentina	2005	0	0
Argentina	2006	0	0
Argentina	2007	5	0
Argentina	2008	1	0
Argentina	2009	6	0
Argentina	2010	5	0
Total		72	9

Scores and results list Argentina's goal tally first, score column indicates score after each Verón goal.

List of international goals scored by Juan Sebastián Verón
No.	Date	Venue	Opponent	Score	Result	Competition
1	6 July 1997	Estadio Defensores del Chaco, Asunción, Paraguay	Paraguay	2–0	2–1	1998 FIFA World Cup qualification
2	4 September 1999	Monumental Stadium, Buenos Aires, Argentina	Brazil	1–0	2–0	Friendly
3	29 March 2000	Monumental Stadium, Buenos Aires, Argentina	Chile	2–1	4–1	2002 FIFA World Cup qualification
4	29 March 2000	Monumental Stadium, Buenos Aires, Argentina	Chile	3–1	4–1	2002 FIFA World Cup qualification
5	3 September 2000	National Stadium, Lima, Peru	Peru	2–0	2–1	2002 FIFA World Cup qualification
6	28 March 2001	Monumental Stadium, Buenos Aires, Argentina	Venezuela	3–0	5–0	2002 FIFA World Cup qualification
7	15 August 2001	Atahualpa Olympic Stadium, Quito, Ecuador	Ecuador	1–0	2–0	2002 FIFA World Cup qualification
8	27 March 2002	Charmilles Stadium, Geneva, Switzerland	Cameroon	1–0	2–2	Friendly
9	20 August 2003	Stadio Artemio Franchi, Florence, Italy	Uruguay	1–1	3–2	Friendly

== Honours ==
Estudiantes

- Primera División: 2006 Apertura, 2010 Apertura
- Copa Libertadores: 2009
- Primera B Nacional: 1994–95
- Copa Sudamericana runner-up: 2008
- FIFA Club World Cup runner-up: 2009
- Recopa Sudamericana runner-up: 2010

Parma

- Coppa Italia: 1998–99
- UEFA Cup: 1998–99

Lazio

- Serie A: 1999–2000
- Coppa Italia: 1999–2000
- Supercoppa Italiana: 2000
- UEFA Super Cup: 1999

Manchester United

- Premier League: 2002–03
- Football League Cup runner-up: 2002–03

Inter Milan

- Serie A: 2005–06
- Coppa Italia: 2004–05, 2005–06
- Supercoppa Italiana: 2005

Asociación Coronel Brandsen

- Liga Amateur Platense de Fútbol – Torneo Clausura: 2012

Argentina

- Copa América runner-up: 2007

Individual

- FIFA World Cup All-Star Team: 1998 (Reserve)
- ESM Team of the Year: 1999–2000
- Premier League Player of the Month: September 2001
- UEFA Champions League top assist provider: 2001–02
- FIFA 100
- Footballer of the Year of Argentina: 2006, 2009
- South American Team of the Year: 2006, 2008, 2009, 2010
- South American Footballer of the Year: 2008, 2009
- Copa Libertadores Most Valuable Player: 2009
- FIFA Club World Cup Silver Ball: 2009
- Konex Award Merit Diploma as one of the five best football players of the last decade in Argentina: 2010
- IFFHS Argentina All Times Dream Team (Team C): 2021

== Trophies won by club during presidency ==
Estudiantes

- Copa Argentina: 2023
- Copa de la Liga Profesional: 2024
- Trofeo de Campeones de la LPF: 2024
- Primera División: 2025 Clausura
