= Roque Mercury =

Argentine footballer (born 1938)

Personal information
- Full name: Roque Mercuri Barrial
- Date of birth: 8 September 1934 (age 92)
- Place of birth: Buenos Aires, Argentina
- Position: Forward

Youth career
- San Lorenzo

Senior career*
Years	Team	Apps	(Gls)
1957–1958	Deportes Tolima	76	(19)
1959	Atlético Bucaramanga		
1960	Deportes Tolima	total	(↑)
1961	Gimnasia La Plata		
1962	San Luis	20	(7)
1963	UTE		
1964	Deportes La Serena	24	(3)
1965	Coquimbo Unido	13	(0)
1966	Deportes Concepción		
1967	Iberia-Puente Alto		
1969	San Antonio Unido		

Managerial career
- 1981–1982: Audax Italiano (youth)
- 1982: Audax Italiano (caretaker)
- 1983: Audax Italiano (assistant)
- 1983: Audax Italiano
- 1984: Green Cross-Temuco
- 1986: Curicó Unido
- 1986: Deportes Laja
- 1987: Deportes Temuco
- 1988: Audax Italiano
- 1989: San Luis de Quillota
- 1989–1990: Deportes Temuco
- 1991: San Luis de Quillota
- 1992: San Antonio Unido
- 1992: Santiago Wanderers
- 1993: Santiago Wanderers (assistant)
- 1993: Santiago Wanderers (youth)
- 1995–1996: Deportes Temuco (youth)
- 1996: Deportes Temuco (caretaker)
- 1997: Deportes Temuco
- 1997: Deportes Temuco
- 2001–2002: Deportes Temuco
- * Club domestic league appearances and goals

Roque Mercuri Barrial (born 8 September 1938), known as Roque Mercury, is an Argentine former football player and manager. He played as a forward for clubs of Chile and Colombia and coached in clubs of Chile. He is a naturalized Chilean and based in Santiago, the capital of Chile.

== Teams (Player) ==
- San Lorenzo de Almagro (youth)
- Deportes Tolima 1957–1958
- Atlético Bucaramanga 1959
- Deportes Tolima 1960
- Gimnasia La Plata 1961
- San Luis de Quillota 1962
- Universidad Técnica del Estado 1963
- Deportes La Serena 1964
- Coquimbo Unido 1965
- Deportes Concepción 1966
- Iberia-Puente Alto 1967
- San Antonio Unido 1969

== Teams (Coach) ==
- Audax Italiano 1982
- Audax Italiano 1983
- Green Cross-Temuco 1984
- Curicó Unido 1986
- Deportes Laja 1986
- Deportes Temuco 1987
- Audax Italiano 1988
- San Luis de Quillota 1989
- Deportes Temuco 1989–1990
- San Luis de Quillota 1991
- San Antonio Unido 1992
- Santiago Wanderers 1992
- Deportes Temuco 1996
- Deportes Temuco 1997
- Deportes Temuco 1997
- Deportes Temuco 2001–2002

== Honours ==
Manager

- Primera B de Chile: 2001

== Personal life ==
Mercury naturalized Chilean by residence. Outside of football coaching, he developed a career as a football commentator.
