= Miguel Ángel Ruiz (Argentine footballer) =

Argentine football player and manager

Personal information
- Full name: Miguel Ángel Ruiz
- Date of birth: 1 October 1934
- Place of birth: La Banda, Argentina
- Date of death: 21 February 2009 (aged 74)
- Position: Right winger

Senior career*
Years	Team	Apps	(Gls)
1956–1961	San Lorenzo	98	(37)
1962	Estudiantes	16	(6)
1964–1966	Huachipato		
1966	Fernández Vial		

International career
1959	Argentina	5	(1)

Managerial career
- Fernández Vial (youth)
- 1966: Fernández Vial (player-manager)
- 1970: Deportes Concepción
- 1975: Huachipato (assistant)
- 1975: Huachipato
- 1982: Fernández Vial
- 1990: Fernández Vial
- * Club domestic league appearances and goals

Miguel Ángel Ruiz (1 October 1934 – 21 February 2009) was an Argentine football inside forward and manager.

== Playing career ==
Born in La Banda, Argentina, Ruiz joined San Lorenzo de Almagro in 1956 until 1961. He was part of Los Cinco Pistoleros (The Five Gunmen), a remembered attacking quintet alongside Héctor Facundo, Omar Higinio García, José Sanfilippo and Norberto Boggio. They won the 1959 Argentine Primera División and took part in the first season of the Copa Libertadores. In 1962, Ruiz switched to Estudiantes de La Plata.

In 1964, Ruiz moved to Chile and joined Huachipato. They won the regional championship, Campeonato Regional de Concepción and took part by first time at professional level in the Chilean Segunda División in 1965–66.

Ruiz ended his career as player-manager of Fernández Vial in 1966.

== International career ==
Ruiz represented the Argentina national team in the 1959 South American Championship in Ecuador and friendlies alogside his teammates in San Lorenzo: Facundo, García, Sanfilippo and Boggio.

== Coaching career ==
Settled in Chile, Ruiz coached clubs from Biobío Region. He started his career as director of the Fernández Vial academy and player-manager of the first team in 1966.

In Chilean Primera División, Ruiz led Deportes Concepción in 1970 and Huachipato in 1975. During the 1975 Copa Libertadores, he also served as assistant coach of Pedro Morales.
