= Diego Sánchez (footballer, born 1999) =

Uruguayan footballer

Personal information
- Full name: Diego Sánchez Richieri
- Date of birth: 30 July 1999 (age 27)
- Place of birth: Montevideo, Uruguay
- Height: 1.91 m (6 ft 3 in)
- Position: Striker

Team information
- Current team: Deportes Temuco
- Number: 19

Youth career
- Defensor Sporting

Senior career*
Years	Team	Apps	(Gls)
2019–2020	Defensor Sporting	0	(0)
2020	Juventud Las Piedras	8	(1)
2021–2022	Colón FC	13	(4)
2022	Central Español	24	(2)
2023	Sud América	31	(6)
2024	Uruguay Montevideo	17	(6)
2024	Deportes Temuco	10	(1)
2025	Albion	25	(5)
2026	Progreso	16	(1)
2026–	Deportes Temuco	7	(2)
- * Club domestic league appearances and goals as of 15 september 2026

Diego Sánchez Richieri (born 30 July 1999) is a Uruguayan footballer who plays as a striker for Chilean club Deportes Temuco.

== Club career ==
Born in Montevideo, Uruguay, Sánchez was trained and started his career with Defensor Sporting in 2019 and 2020. The next year, he switched to Juventud Las Piedras on 28 January 2020.

The next seasons, Sánchez played for Colón FC, Central Español, Sud América and Uruguay Montevideo in his homeland.

In the second half of 2024, Sánchez moved abroad and joined Chilean club Deportes Temuco on a deal until the end of the year.

Back to Uruguay, Sánchez joined Albion on 21 January 2025.

In July 2026, Sánchez rejoined Chilean club Deportes Temuco from Progreso on a deal for a year.
