= Ribamar Batista =

Brazilian footballer

Personal information
- Full name: Ribamar Batista da Silva
- Date of birth: 14 July 1955 (age 71)
- Place of birth: São Paulo, Brazil
- Position: Forward

Youth career
- 1969–1972: São Paulo

Senior career*
| Years | Team | Apps | (Gls) |
| 1970–1973 | São Paulo | | |
| 1972 | → Paulista (loan) | | |
| 1974–1978 | Paulista | | |
| 1978–1979 | Independiente Cauquenes | | |
| 1980–1988 | Audax Italiano | 139 | (37) |
| 1983 | → Green Cross-Temuco (loan) | 34 | (10) |
| 1986 | → Deportes Valdivia (loan) | | |
| 1986 | → Coquimbo Unido (loan) | | |
- * Club domestic league appearances and goals

Ribamar Batista da Silva (born 14 July 1955), kwown as Ribamar Batista, is a Brazilian former footballer who played as a forward for clubs in Brazil and Chile.

== Career ==
Born in São Paulo, Brazil, Batista joined the São Paulo FC youth ranks at the age of 14 from a neighborhood club and made his senior debut at the same age. Later, he was loaned out to Paulista at the age of 17.

Still a player for Paulista, Batista emigrated to Chile in 1978 and signed with Independiente de Cauquenes after a trial with Ñublense. The next season, he recommended the signing of his friend Benedicto Pereira with whom he had played in Brazil and became the 1979 Segunda División top goalscorer with 36 goals.

In 1980, Batista switched to Audax Italiano for nine seasons, becoming a historical player for them. In Chilean Primera División, he also played on loan for Green Cross-Temuco in 1983.

As an anecdote, Batista scored three free kick goals in the 4–1 home victory for Audax Italiano against Deportes La Serena in the 1982 Primera División.

Batista retired at the age of 33.

== Personal life ==
Following his retirement, Batista settled in Chile and decided to stay away from football.
