= Gerson Valle =

Chilean footballer

Personal information
- Full name: Gerson Nicolás Valle Alvear
- Date of birth: 9 November 1989 (age 36)
- Place of birth: Concepción, Chile
- Position: Midfielder

Youth career
- Huachipato

Senior career*
Years	Team	Apps	(Gls)
2006	Huachipato		
2007–2009	Lower Hutt City		
2010–2013	Fernández Vial		
2014–2015	Deportes Concepción	17	(0)
2014	→ Huachipato (loan)	5	(0)
2015–2016	Unión San Felipe	10	(0)
2016–2018	Deportes Puerto Montt	38	(0)
2019	Fernández Vial	16	(0)
- * Club domestic league appearances and goals

Gerson Nicolás Valle Alvear (born 9 November 1989) is a Chilean former footballer who played as a midfielder for clubs in Chile and New Zealand.

== Career ==
A product of Huachipato, Valle emigrated to New Zealand in 2007 and joined Lower Hutt City in the Central League.

Back in Chile, he played for Fernández Vial, winning two league titles of the Tercera A. In 2014, he rejoined Huachipato on loan from Deportes Concepción in the Chilean Primera División. The next seasons, he played for Deportes Concepción, Unión San Felipe, Deportes Puerto Montt and Fernández Vial again, his last club in 2019.

== Legal issues ==
In December 2023, Valle was arrested by drug trafficking and carrying weapons alongside another four people in Talcahuano, Chile.
