= Félix Triñanes =

Argentine footballer

Personal information
- Full name: Félix Triñanes
- Date of birth: 3 May 2004 (age 22)
- Place of birth: Buenos Aires, Argentina
- Height: 1.71 m (5 ft 7 in)
- Position: Attacking midfielder

Team information
- Current team: 2 de Mayo (on loan from Deportes Temuco)

Youth career
- Banfield

Senior career*
Years	Team	Apps	(Gls)
2024–	Deportes Temuco	0	(0)
2025	→ Cobresal (loan)	14	(2)
2026–	→ 2 de Mayo (loan)	0	(0)
- * Club domestic league appearances and goals as of 24 December 2025

Félix Triñanes (born 3 May 2004) is an Argentine footballer who plays as an attacking midfielder for Paraguayan club 2 de Mayo on loan from Chilean club Deportes Temuco.

== Career ==
A product of Banfield, Triñanes moved to Chile and signed with Deportes Temuco in October 2024. He made his debut in the 1–1 draw against O'Higgins for the 2025 Copa Chile.

In February 2025, Triñanes was loaned out to Cobresal in the Chilean Primera División on a deal for a season. He scored his first goal in the 1–1 draw against Ñublense on 22 June. The next year, he was loaned out to Paraguayan club 2 de Mayo.
