= Marcelo Vega (footballer, born 1971) =

Chilean footballer

Personal information
- Full name: Francisco Marcelo Vega Cepeda
- Date of birth: August 12, 1971 (age 55)
- Place of birth: Copiapó, Chile
- Height: 5 ft 9 in (1.75 m)
- Position: Attacking midfielder

Senior career*
Years	Team	Apps	(Gls)
1988–1990	Regional Atacama	68	(24)
1991–1992	Unión Española	34	(8)
1992–1993	Logroñes	3	(0)
1993–1995	Colo-Colo	42	(12)
1996	Regional Atacama	23	(7)
1997	Santiago Wanderers	7	(2)
1998	MetroStars	17	(1)
1999	San Jose Earthquakes	0	(0)
2000–2001	Racing Club	6	(0)
2002	Unión Española	15	(4)
2003	Cienciano	14	(6)
2003	Universidad de Chile	10	(1)
Total		239	(65)

International career
1987	Chile U16		
1991–1998	Chile	30	(1)
- * Club domestic league appearances and goals

Francisco Marcelo Vega Cepeda (Copiapó, Chile, August 12, 1971) is a former Chilean footballer and sports commentator, who played as a midfielder and is recognized for being one of the best creative midfielder in Chilean football.

== Club career ==
Marcelo Vega began his football career defending Regional Atacama, aged 14. At 16 he was a top scorer in the second division. Then he was transferred to Unión Española, in 1991, a club with which he made his debut in the First Division and under the technical direction of Nelson Acosta he had his best performances, thanks to Marcelo they became champions of the Chile Cup for two consecutive years, in 1992 and 1993 Marcelo Vega also holds the record of winning 3 consecutive Chile Cups, 2 with Unión Española and 1 with Colo Colo.

Nicknamed "Guatón" or "Tobi", due to his resemblance to the character of the homonymous children's comic (Toby and his friends), and the Chilean Maradona for his similarity in football on the field, Vega also played in Colo-Colo, Santiago Wanderers, Logroñés from Spain, MetroStars from the United States and Racing Club in Argentina, he also played at Cienciano from Peru, in addition to another stint at Regional Atacama and Unión Española. His last campaigns as a professional were played at the University of Chile.

Selected Chilean since 1986, he participated in the South American sub 16 in Peru, leaving in the FIFA ideal team together with Marco Antonio Etcheverry and other figures of that South American, he also played in the 1991 Copa América in Chile and in the 1993 Copa América in Ecuador. In addition, he was in the Chilean squad that traveled to the 1998 World Cup in France, where he played only half time against Brazil, in fact the Chilean discount from Marcelo Salas was after a pass from Vega and later pivoting from Iván Zamorano, but he did not have a greater performance due to which he reached the World Cup injured. He played 30 times for the Chile National Team between 1991 and 1998, scoring 1 goal.

He was the biggest assistant in the qualifiers for the World Cup in France 98.

== International career ==
Vega represented Chile at under-16 level in the 1986 South American Championship

He was capped 30 times and scored 1 goal for the Chile national team between 1991 and 1998. At the 1998 FIFA World Cup he played 45 minutes in the round of 16 match versus Brazil.

== Personal life ==
He is a panelist in the program Todos Somos Técnicos (We Are All Technicians) from TNT Sports (former CDF), in which he stands out for evaluating Chilean soccer players and for his great sense of humor.

In 2009, he participated in the Chilean reality show called 1810, but was eliminated.

== Honors ==
Unión Española

- Copa Chile: 1992, 1993

Colo-Colo

- Primera División de Chile: 1993
- Copa Chile: 1994
