= Jorge Carrasco (footballer, born 1960) =

Chilean footballer

Personal information
- Full name: Jorge Iván Carrasco Monsalves
- Date of birth: 3 November 1960 (age 66)
- Height: 1.73 m (5 ft 8 in)
- Position: Defender

Senior career*
Years	Team	Apps	(Gls)
1979-1982	Lota Schwager		
1983-1987	Fernández Vial		
1988	Cobreloa		
1988-1990	Huachipato		
1991	Deportes Concepción		
1992	Huachipato		
1993-1997	Deportes Concepción		

International career
1989	Chile	6	(0)
- * Club domestic league appearances and goals

Jorge Iván Carrasco Monsalves (born 3 November 1960) is a Chilean former footballer who played as a defender. He made six appearances for the Chile national team in 1989. He was also part of Chile's squad for the 1989 Copa América tournament.
