= Carlos González (footballer, born 1960) =

Chilean football manager

Personal information
- Full name: Carlos Alberto González Romero
- Date of birth: 1960
- Place of birth: Coronel, Chile
- Position: Attacking midfielder

Youth career
- Lota Schwager

Senior career*
Years	Team	Apps	(Gls)
1976–1980	Lota Schwager	50	(1)
1981	Naval	18	(1)
1982	Lota Schwager		
1983–1986	Fernández Vial	73	(6)
1987	Universidad de Chile	0	(0)
1988	Palestino	25	(5)
1989	Unión Española	13	(8)
1990	Sporting Cristal		
- Saprissa
- Luis Ángel Firpo
1991	Deportes La Serena	9	(0)
- Audax Italiano
1994	Deportes Concepción	9	(0)

Managerial career
- 1995–2002: Deportes Concepción (youth)
- 2002: Deportes Concepción
- 2004: Deportivo Temuco
- 2005: Santiago Wanderers
- 2006–2007: Deportivo Temuco
- 2008: Fernández Vial
- 2010: Unión Temuco (youth)
- 2010–2011: Unión Temuco
- * Club domestic league appearances and goals

Carlos Alberto González Romero (born in 1960 in Coronel) is a Chilean football manager and former footballer.

== Playing career ==
In 1990, González joined Peruvian club Sporting Cristal, coinciding with his compatriots Quemel Farías as teammate and Eugenio Jara as coach.

== Coaching career ==
In 2004, he was signed by Deportes Temuco. That season he put the team into the Torneo Apertura and Torneo Clausura quarterfinals.

On December 12, 2005, he agreed a contract with Santiago Wanderers to coach them for face the Torneo Apertura. On July 3, he was fired from Wanderers.

In 2006, he returned to Temuco to coach the now called Deportivo Temuco. On April 23, 2007, he was fired from Deportivo Temuco, being replaced by Eduardo Bonvallet.
