= Cristián Montecinos =

Chilean footballer (born 1970)

Personal information
- Full name: Cristián Antonio Montecinos González
- Date of birth: 29 December 1970 (age 55)
- Place of birth: Talca, Chile
- Height: 1.80 m (5 ft 11 in)
- Position: Striker

Youth career
- 1984–1988: Rangers

Senior career*
Years	Team	Apps	(Gls)
1988–1990	Rangers	50	(21)
1991–1994	Unión Española	41	(16)
1993	→ Deportes Temuco (loan)	25	(12)
1994–1995	Junior	46	(26)
1996	Deportes Tolima	9	(1)
1996–1997	Santos Laguna	37	(5)
1998	Deportes Concepción	6	(5)
1998	Cruz Azul	14	(2)
1999	Colo-Colo	28	(10)
2000	Necaxa	12	(4)
2000	Puebla	12	(3)
2001	Deportes Concepción	11	(9)
2001–2002	Al Wasl	18	(14)
2002	Dubai CSC	21	(19)
2003	Al-Ittihad	4	(5)
2003–2004	Al Wahda	0	(0)
2005–2007	Deportes Concepción	47	(20)
2006	→ Unión Española (loan)	20	(1)
2009	San Marcos	2	(0)
Total		403	(173)

International career
1999–2001	Chile	9	(3)
- * Club domestic league appearances and goals

Cristian Antonio Montecinos González (born 29 December 1970) is a Chilean former footballer who played as a striker for several teams in Chile, Colombia, Mexico, the United Arab Emirates and Qatar. He also played for the Chile national team.

Montecinos began his professional career in 1988. During his playing career he played for teams like Rangers, Unión Española, Deportes Temuco, Atlético Junior, Santos Laguna, Deportes Concepción, Cruz Azul, Colo-Colo, Necaxa, Puebla, Al Wasl, among others.

Montecinos was member of Chile's 23-man squad at 2001 Copa América, whilst the team was coached by Nelson Acosta.

== Club career ==
A product of his hometown's team youth set-up, Rangers de Talca, he professionally debuted in 1988. That year he only played one game and didn't scored goals at the second-level (Primera B. Then, and now at top-level following the team's promotion, he netted seven goals in 21 participations.

In 1992, Montecinos was transferred to Unión Española, winning the cup title the same year. One year later, he was hired by Deportes Temuco where was Copa Chile goalscorer with fifteen goals.

In 1994, he moved to Colombia to play for Atlético Junior. There he became a key player in a club where he had a teammates to players like Iván René Valenciano and Carlos Valderrama. During his spell at Barranquilla-based side between 1995 and 1994, Montecinos scored 16 goals, which allowed him to be recruited by Mexico's Santos Laguna for the 1996–97 season. He was part of Necaxa's squad that finished third in the 2000 FIFA Club World Championship. He scored against Manchester United and South Melbourne in the group stage.

== International career ==
Montecinos represented the Chile national side during the Copa América 2001, scoring three goals in four games.

== Personal life ==
Montecinos is the father of the Chile international footballer Joaquín Montecinos who was born in Colombia when he played for Junior de Barranquilla.

== Honours ==
Rangers

- Segunda División de Chile (1): 1988

Unión Española

- Copa Chile (1): 1992

Junior de Barranquilla

- Primera A (1): 1995

Santos Laguna

- Mexico Primera Division: 1996 Invierno

Necaxa

- FIFA Club World Cup: Third Place - 2000

Individual

- FIFA Club World Cup All-Star Team: 2000
