= Quemel Farías =

Chilean footballer

Personal information
- Full name: Quemel Edgardo Farías Mancilla
- Date of birth: 1 July 1963 (age 63)
- Place of birth: La Serena, Chile
- Height: 1.80 m (5 ft 11 in)
- Position: Goalkeeper

Youth career
- Jesús Herrera
- Estudiantes Unidos

Senior career*
Years	Team	Apps	(Gls)
1980–1981	Aviación		
1982–1987	Cobreloa	10	(0)
1986	→ Audax Italiano (loan)	10	(0)
1988–1989	Deportes Ovalle		
1990	Sporting Cristal		
1991	Cobresal	5	(0)
1992–1996	Deportes La Serena	53	(0)
1997	Deportes Arica		

Managerial career
- Taltal (city team)
- 2010–2015: Minera Escondida
- 2015–2022: Deportes Antofagasta (youth)
- 2016–2019: Deportes Antofagasta (women)
- 2016–2019: Deportes Antofagasta (women) (youth)
- 2022–2024: Deportes Antofagasta (youth)
- 2024: Deportes Antofagasta (interim)
- * Club domestic league appearances and goals

Quemel Edgardo Farías Mancilla is a Chilean football manager and former goalkeeper who played for clubs in Chile and Peru.

== Playing career ==
As a youth player, Farías was with clubs Jesús Herrera and Estudiantes Unidos from La Serena, Chile. At senior level, he began his career with Aviación in the Chilean top division in 1980–81.

From 1982 to 1987, he played for Cobreloa, a successful stint for the club at both national and international level. In 1986, he had a stint on loan at Audax Italiano, also in the top division. After two seasons with Deportes Ovalle in the second level, he moved to Peru and joined Sporting Cristal in 1990, coinciding with his compatriots Carlos González as teammate and Eugenio Jara as coach.

Back in Chile, he played for Cobresal before joining Deportes La Serena, with whom he spent five seasons between 1992 and 1996.

His last club was Deportes Arica in 1997.

== Coaching career ==
Farías graduated and specialized as a football manager at institutions such as the European Association for Distance Learning, INAF (National Football Institute), Catholic University of the North, ESEFUL Institute in Peru, A.T.F.A. in Argentina, among others.

As a coach of academies based in the Norte Grande of Chile and the Taltal city team, he is considered a discoverer of the Chile national team top goalscorer Alexis Sánchez.

In the first half of 2010s, he performed as coach of the Club Social y Deportivo Minera Escondida at the same time he worked for the Minera Escondida, a mining company.

The next seasons, he worked as coach at the Deportes Antofagasta youth ranks and the women's team.

In 2022, he assumed as the head of the Deportes Antofagasta youth system.

== Personal life ==
He is known for his distinctive moustache, he was recognized as a charismatic presence on the field during his playing career..
