= 1992 Copa Chile =

Tournament details
- Country: Chile
- Teams: 27

Final positions
- Champions: U. Española
- Runners-up: Colo-Colo

Tournament statistics
- Top goal scorer: Marcelo Vega (13 goals)

The 1992 Copa Chile was the 22nd edition of the Chilean Cup tournament. The competition started on February 29, 1992, and concluded on June 18, 1992. U. Española won the competition for their second time, beating Colo-Colo 3–1 on the final. The points system used in the first round of the tournament was; 2 points for the winner but, if the winner team scores 4 or more goals, they won 3 points; in case of a tie, every team took 1 point but, no points for each team if the score were 0–0.

== Calendar ==
Round	Date
Group Round	29 February 1992; 7 May 1992
Round of 16	10–14 May 1992
Quarterfinals	17–21 May 1992
Semi-finals	24 May 1992; 3 June 1992
Final	18 June 1992

== Group Round ==
Key to colours in group tables
Teams that progressed to the second round

=== Group 1 ===
	DANT	DARI	CSAL	CLOA	DIQU	RATA
D. Antofagasta		0–0	3–0	3–1	4–0	1–0
D. Arica	1–1		3–1	1–3	2–0	2–3
Cobresal	2–0	7–1		1–1	1–0	2–2
Cobreloa	1–0	2–0	5–0		4–0	3–1
D. Iquique	0–0	1–2	2–1	1–2		2–2
R. Atacama	1–1	2–1	0–0	0–1	3–1	

Rank	Team	Points
1	Cobreloa	19
2	Deportes Antofagasta	11
3	Regional Atacama	9
4	Cobresal	9
5	Deportes Arica	7
6	Deportes Iquique	1

=== Group 2 ===
	EVER	COQU	DLSE	SWAN	ULCA	USFE
Everton		1–2	0–0	1–1	6–1	3–0
Coquimbo U.	2–2		0–0	1–1	0–0	2–0
D. La Serena	0–2	0–2		1–0	5–0	4–1
S. Wanderers	2–4	1–3	0–4		2–1	3–0
U. La Calera	4–4	1–1	1–3	1–1		3–1
U. San Felipe	3–3	1–2	0–2	1–1	1–0	

Rank	Team	Points
1	Deportes La Serena	15
2	Everton	14
3	Coquimbo Unido	13
4	Santiago Wanderers	8
5	Unión La Calera	5
6	Unión San Felipe	4

=== Group 3 ===
	PALE	UCAT	UCHI	AUDI	RANG
Palestino		3–0	2–2	4–1	2–1
U. Católica	1–2		2–3	6–1	2–0
U. de Chile	2–2	1–0		1–1	2–1
Audax I.	0–1	3–3	1–5		5–2
Rangers	1–1	5–3	0–4	2–1	

Rank	Team	Points
1	Palestino	18
2	Universidad de Chile	16
3	Universidad Católica	10
4	Audax Italiano	9
5	Rangers	6

==== Intergroup scores (groups 3-4) ====
UCHI	3–3	COLO	2–0
AUDI	3–1	DMEL	1–3
DCOL	3–1	RANG	0–1
MAGA	2–3	PALE	3–2
UESP	0–1	UCAT	2–1

=== Group 4 ===
	UESP	COLO	MAGA	DMEL	DCOL
U. Española		1–1	3–4	5–0	4–0
Colo-Colo	2–1		2–2	0–1	2–0
Magallanes	1–3	2–1		1–1	2–1
D. Melipilla	2–3	4–1	2–1		0–1
D. Colchagua	0–2	1–4	2–1	2–1	

Rank	Team	Points
1	Unión Española	13
2	Colo-Colo	12
3	Deportes Colchagua	10
4	Magallanes	9
5	Deportes Melipilla	8

=== Group 5 ===
	HUAC	OHIG	FVIA	LSCH	USCR
Huachipato		3–0	4–2	2–2	4–0
O'Higgins	2–1		1–1	6–1	3–1
F. Vial	0–0	1–1		0–1	0–1
Lota S.	2–2	2–1	0–0		3–3
U. Santa Cruz	1–1	2–5	3–2	0–0	

Rank	Team	Points
1	Huachipato	16
2	O'Higgins	13
3	Lota Schwager	8
4	Unión Santa Cruz	8
5	Fernández Vial	4

==== Intergroup scores (groups 5-6) ====
IBER	3–2	USCR	2–1
OHIG	0–0	POSO	1–1
DTEM	1–2	HUAC	4–3
FVIA	0–0	DCON	1–2
DPMO	3–2	LSCH	1–1

=== Group 6 ===
	POSO	DCON	DPMO	DTEM	IBER
P. Osorno		1–1	4–0	1–0	6–1
D. Concepción	1–1		2–0	4–0	1–1
D. Puerto Montt	2–1	3–1		5–2	1–1
D. Temuco	2–0	0–0	1–0		4–1
Iberia	0–0	1–1	2–2	0–3	

Rank	Team	Points
1	Provincial Osorno	12
2	Deportes Puerto Montt	12
3	Deportes Concepción	9
4	Deportes Temuco	9
5	Iberia	7

== Round of 16 ==
Team 1	Agg.	Team 2	1st leg	2nd leg
Deportes Antofagasta	4–4 (3-1p)	Cobreloa	2–2	2–2
Deportes La Serena	2–3	Coquimbo Unido	1–2	1–1
Deportes Concepción	2–1	Huachipato	1–1	1–0
Provincial Osorno	1–6	Universidad de Chile	1–2	0–4
Deportes Puerto Montt	0–5	Unión Española	0–3	0–2
Everton	2–5	Colo-Colo	1–2	1–3
Palestino	2–2 (3-5p)	O'Higgins	1–1	1–1
Deportes Colchagua	0–7	Universidad Católica	0–1	0–6

== Quarterfinals ==
Team 1	Agg.	Team 2	1st leg	2nd leg
O'Higgins	1–4	Deportes Antofagasta	1–3	0–1
Universidad de Chile	3–2	Coquimbo Unido	1–0	2–2
Deportes Concepción	3–6	Unión Española	0–1	3–5
Colo-Colo	6–4	Universidad Católica	2–3	4–1

== Semifinals ==
May 24, 1992

Universidad de Chile	0 – 0	Unión Española

Estadio Nacional, Santiago
Attendance: 42,092
Referee: C. Robles

May 24, 1992

Deportes Antofagasta	3 – 1	Colo-Colo
Véner 17'; Villalba 20', 76'		Adomaitis 87'

Estadio Regional, Antofagasta
Attendance: 26,052
Referee: E. Marín

June 3, 1992

Unión Española	4 – 1	Universidad de Chile
Vega 13', 80', 85'; Dely Valdes 66'		Romero 88'

Estadio Nacional, Santiago
Attendance: 33,425
Referee: E. Gamboa

June 3, 1992

Colo-Colo	4 – 0	Deportes Antofagasta
Pizarro 15'; Mendoza 35'; De Luca 85'; Garrido 89'

Estadio Monumental David Arellano, Santiago
Attendance: 41,457
Referee: I. Guerrero

== Final ==
June 18, 1992

Unión Española	3 – 1	Colo-Colo
Vega 31', 80', 85'		Own-goal 86'

Estadio Nacional, Santiago
Attendance: 76,909
Referee: E. Marín

== Top goalscorer ==
- Marcelo Vega (U. Española) 13 goals

== See also ==
- 1992 Campeonato Nacional
- Primera B
