= Nelson Sandoval =

Chilean footballer

Personal information
- Full name: Nelson Antonio Sandoval Villanueva
- Date of birth: 20 January 1970 (age 56)
- Place of birth: Santiago, Chile
- Position: Forward

Youth career
- Colo-Colo

Senior career*
Years	Team	Apps	(Gls)
1988–1993	Colo-Colo	8	(0)
1990–1991	→ Deportes Temuco (loan)		
1992	→ Deportes Concepción (loan)	21	(3)
1993	→ Magallanes (loan)		
1993	→ Provincial Osorno (loan)	13	(2)
1994	Coquimbo Unido	18	(3)
1995	Audax Italiano	16	(2)
1996	Aurich-Cañaña		
1997	Unión Santa Cruz		
1999	Unión San Felipe	10	(2)

International career
1992	Chile U23		
- * Club domestic league appearances and goals

Nelson Antonio Sandoval Villanueva (born 20 January 1970) is a former Chilean professional footballer who played as a forward for clubs in Chile and Peru.

== Club career ==
A product of Colo-Colo, Sandoval made his professional debut in 1988 and won four titles with them. In the Chilean Primera División, he also played for Deportes Concepción, Provincial Osorno and Coquimbo Unido.

In the Chilean second level, he played for Deportes Temuco, Magallanes, Audax Italiano, Unión Santa Cruz and Unión San Felipe, his last club. A historical player of Deportes Temuco, he became the top goalscorer in 1991 and won the 1991 Segunda División.

Abroad, he had a stint with Peruvian club Aurich-Cañaña in the 1996 Torneo Descentralizado.

== International career ==
Sandoval represented Chile in the 1992 CONMEBOL Pre-Olympic Tournament.

== Personal life ==
In 2023, his left leg was amputated due to complications with diabetes.
