= Carlos Girardengo =

Argentine football manager and player

Personal information
- Full name: Carlos Alberto Girardengo
- Date of birth: 18 January 1964
- Place of birth: La Plata, Argentina
- Position: Left midfielder

Team information
- Current team: Ordino (youth) (coach)

Youth career
- Gimnasia La Plata

Senior career*
Years	Team	Apps	(Gls)
1981–1986	Gimnasia LP	7	(0)
1984–1986	→ Atlético MdP (loan)		
1986	Racing de Olavarría		
- Deportes Concepción
- Atlético Tembetary
1988–1989	Banfield		
1989–1990	Aldosivi	4	(0)
- Ever Ready

International career
1982	Argentina U20		

Managerial career
- Gimnasia LP (youth)
- 1999–2000: Argentino de Quilmes
- 2001: Puerto Rico U20
- 2003–2004: San Martín SJ
- 2004: Almagro
- 2005–20??: Gimnasia LP (youth) (coordinator)
- ACB (youth) (coordinator)
- Fundación FESA
- 2012: Deportes Temuco
- 2012: Deportes Temuco
- 2013: Malleco Unido
- Porteño FC
- All Boys (youth)
- Aldosivi (youth)
- 2016: Villa San Carlos
- 2016: Ferro de Olavarría
- 2017: Unión Aconquija
- 2017: Racing de Olavarría
- 2020–2021: Portosantense
- 2023: Mazatlán (assistant)
- 2024–2025: El Nacional (assistant)
- 2025: El Nacional (youth)
- 2026: GZS Bridgeport
- 2026: Inter Miami (youth)
- 2026–: Ordino (youth)
- * Club domestic league appearances and goals

Carlos Alberto Girardengo (born 18 January 1964) is an Argentine football manager and former player who played as a left midfielder. He currently is working for the FC Ordino youth system.

== Playing career ==
A product of Gimnasia La Plata, he was promoted to the first team in 1981 and made his professional debut in 1983. The next year, he was loaned out to Atlético Mar del Plata.

Following Gimnasia La Plata, Girardengo played for Racing de Olavarría, Deportes Concepción, Atlético Tembetary, Banfield, Aldosivi and Ever Ready from Dolores.

At international level, Girardengo represented Argentina in the 1982 Southern Cross Games.

== Managerial career ==
Girardengo has mainly developed his career throughout Americas, including Argentina, Uruguay, Puerto Rico, El Salvador, Chile, Mexico, Ecuador and the United States.

- (Argentina) Gimnasia y Esgrima La Plata (youth)
- (Argentina) Argentino de Quilmes 1999–2000
- Puerto Rico U20 2001
- (Argentina) San Martín de San Juan 2003–2004
- (Argentina) Almagro 2004
- (Argentina) Gimnasia y Esgrima La Plata (youth) (coordinator) 2005–20??
- (Argentina) Asociación Coronel Brandsen (youth) (coordinator)
- (El Salvador) Fundación FESA
- (Chile) Deportes Temuco 2012
- (Chile) Deportes Temuco 2012
- (Chile) Malleco Unido 2013
- (Argentina) Porteño Fútbol Club
- (Argentina) All Boys (youth)
- (Argentina) Aldosivi (youth)
- (Argentina) Villa San Carlos 2016
- (Argentina) Ferro Carril Sud Olavarría 2016
- (Argentina) Unión Aconquija 2017
- (Argentina) Racing de Olavarría 2017
- (Portugal) Portosantense 2020–2021
- (Mexico) Mazatlán (assistant) 2023
- (Ecuador) El Nacional (assistant) 2024–2025
- (Ecuador) El Nacional (youth) 2025
- (United States) GZS Bridgeport FC 2026
- (United States) Inter Miami (youth) 2026
- (Andorra) Ordino (youth) 2026–Present
