= Germán Cornejo =

Chilean footballer and manager

Personal information
- Full name: Germán Jacobo Cornejo Córdova
- Date of birth: 13 March 1944 (age 82)
- Place of birth: San Fernando, Chile
- Position: Midfielder

Senior career*
Years	Team	Apps	(Gls)
1961	Colchagua		
1962–1966	Palestino		

Managerial career
- 1978–1979: Unión Española
- 1979: Chile (assistant)
- 1981: Rangers
- 1982: Chile (assistant)
- 1982–1983: O'Higgins
- 1984–1985: Naval
- 1986: San Luis
- 1987: Rangers
- 1988: Deportes La Serena
- 1990: Fernández Vial
- 1991: Huachipato
- 1992: O'Higgins
- 1994: Fernández Vial
- 1994–1995: Palestino (youth)
- 1995–1996: Palestino
- 1998: Jacksonville Cyclones
- 1999–2000: Colchagua
- 2000: Al-Arabi (assistant)
- 2002: Tembetary
- 2004: Deportes Arica
- 2005: Motagua
- 2006: Fernández Vial
- 2007: Curicó Unido
- 2009–2010: Cobreloa (youth)
- 2009: Cobreloa (interim)
- 2010: Cobreloa (interim)
- 2017–2018: Cobreloa (assistant)
- 2018: Cobreloa (youth)
- * Club domestic league appearances and goals

Germán Jacobo Cornejo Córdova (born 13 March 1944) is a Chilean football manager and former player. Besides Chile, he has worked in Paraguay and Honduras.

== Playing career ==
Born in San Fernando, Chile, Cornejo played for his hometown's club Colchagua in the Segunda División and Palestino in the Chilean top level as a midfielder.

== Coaching career ==
=== As head coach ===
Cornejo mainly developed his career at the Chilean top division, leading Unión Española, Rangers, O'Higgins, Naval, San Luis, Deportes La Serena, Fernández Vial, Palestino and Cobreloa as interim coach in 2009 and 2010, since he worked as coach of the youth ranks.

In the second level, he coached Huachipato, Fernández Vial, Colchagua, Deportes Arica and Curicó Unido.

As coach of Huachipato, he earned promotion to the top level after becoming the runner-up of the 1991 Segunda División.

Abroad, he coached the American club Jacksonville Cyclones, the Paraguayan club Tembetary in the Primera de Ascenso and the Honduran club Motagua in the Liga Nacional Profesional.

=== As assistant coach ===
Cornejo served as assistant of Luis Santibáñez in the Chile national team at the 1979 Copa América and the 1982 FIFA World Cup, in addition to the Qatari club Al-Arabi in 2000.

At club level, he served as assistant of José Sulantay in Cobreloa in 2017.

=== At youth level ===
Cornejo has worked in the youth systems of clubs such as Palestino and Cobreloa, where he rejoined in 2018.

== Other works ==
He permanently performs as a football teacher, making courses in his homeland and abroad in countries such as Honduras, where he worked for FIFA previous to his signing with Motagua.

In 2019, Cornejo was honored due to his contributions in football by Radio Manuel Rodríguez from his hometown, San Fernando, alongside other successful sportspeople.
