= Club Atlético y Progreso =

Atlético y Progreso
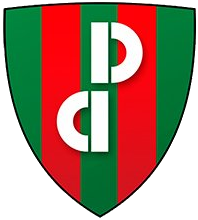
- Full name: Club Social Deportivo y Cultural Atlético y Progreso
- Nickname: Rojiverde
- Founded: 20 August 1967; 58 years ago
- Ground: Estadio Clemente Jauregui Lorda, Brandsen, Argentina
- Chairman: Mario Echeverri
- League: Liga Chascomunense
- 2025: ?
Home colours

Club Social Deportivo y Cultural Atlético y Progreso (simply known as Atlético y Progreso) is an Argentine sports club, located in the city of Brandsen in the homonymous partido of Buenos Aires Province. The football team plays in the regional "Liga Chascomunense de Fútbol" ("Chascomús Football League") while the rugby union squad participates in Segunda División, the fourth division of the URBA league system. The club also has field hockey teams competing in Cuenca del Salado league.

Apart from the aforementioned sections, Atlético y Progreso also hosts the practise of other sports such as basketball, field hockey, jiu jitsu, artistic roller skating, and volleyball. By 2013 the club had about 1,300 active members.

The football team play their home matches at Estadio Clemente Jauregui Lorda, while the rugby and hockey fields are distant some blocks from the Jauregui Lorda, on Calle 25.

== History ==
Atlético y Progreso was established on August 20, 1967, from the merger of both institutions, Club Atlético and Club Progreso of Brandsen. The club has about 2,400 active members.

One of Atlético y Progreso's most notable athletes was footballer Sebastián Saja, a Brandsen native who started playing football at the club when he was only 5 years old. Saja then developed a long career in some of the most notable Primera División clubs such as San Lorenzo and Racing among others, and even the Argentina national team.

In rugby, the club finished 4th. in the 2025 Segunda División season.
