= Miguel Latín =

Chilean footballer (born 1968)

Miguel Angel Latín Carrasco (born July 27, 1968 in Llay-Llay, Chile) is a former Chilean footballer who played for clubs of Chile.

Latín played as a right back for Deportes Temuco before joining Colo-Colo for the 1997 Clausura tournament. Latín was a peripheral figure at Colo-Colo, playing in the 1997 Copa Libertadores group stage and making just two league appearances as the club won the title.

After he retired from playing, Latín became a football coach. He was appointed caretaker manager of Deportes Temuco in 2013, leading the club until the end of the year.

== Teams ==
- (Chile) Santiago Wanderers 1988-1990
- (Chile) Unión Española 1991
- (Chile) Deportes Temuco 1992-1996
- (Chile) Colo-Colo 1997
- (Chile) Deportes Temuco 1998
- (Chile) Deportes La Serena 1999

== Honours ==
Colo-Colo

- Primera División de Chile (1): 1997
