= Rafael Bianchi =

Uruguayan footballer (born 1971)

Personal information
- Full name: Rafael Alberto Bianchi Gandin
- Date of birth: January 7, 1971 (age 55)
- Place of birth: Montevideo, Uruguay
- Height: 1.89 m (6 ft 2 in)
- Position: Forward

Senior career*
Years	Team	Apps	(Gls)
1987–1988	Central Español		
1989–1990	Nacional	3	(0)
1990	Lanús	8	(1)
1991	Palestino	20	(4)
1992	Cerro		
1993	Everton	28	(6)
1994	Bella Vista		
1995	Nacional	10	(2)
1996	Rampla Juniors	11	(6)
1996–1999	Huracán de Corrientes	31	(10)
1997–1998	→ Brown de Arrecifes (loan)	21	(15)
2000	Herediano		
2001	Huracán Buceo	6	(1)

International career
1992	Uruguay		
- * Club domestic league appearances and goals

Rafael Alberto Bianchi Gandin (born January 7, 1971, in Montevideo) is a Uruguayan former footballer who played for clubs in Uruguay, Argentina, Chile and Costa Rica.

== Career ==
Bianchi had two stints with Nacional in 1989–1990 and 1995.

In Chile, he played for Palestino in 1991 and Everton de Viña del Mar in 1993.

In Argentina, he had stints with Lanús, Huracán de Corrientes and Brown de Arrecifes.

At international level, he took part in two friendly matches for the Uruguay national team against Recreativo de Huelva and Benfica in August 1992.
