= Pedro Verde =

Argentine association football player

Personal information
- Full name: Pedro Andrés Verde Erbetta
- Date of birth: 12 March 1949 (age 77)
- Place of birth: General Pico, La Pampa, Argentina
- Position: Forward

Senior career*
Years	Team	Apps	(Gls)
1969–1973	Estudiantes	90	(13)
1973–1977	Las Palmas	42	(5)
1977–1979	Hércules	56	(5)
1979–1980	Sheffield United	10	(3)
Total		198	(26)

International career
1978	Argentina	3	(0)
- * Club domestic league appearances and goals

Pedro Andrés Verde Erbetta (born 6 March 1949) is a former Argentine professional footballer who played as a forward for Club Estudiantes de La Plata, and briefly Sheffield United.

== Club career ==
Pedro Verde began his career in Argentina in 1969 playing for Estudiantes de La Plata. He played for the La Plata club until 1973, a club where he scored 13 goals in 90 games. That year he went to Spain to join the squad of UD Las Palmas, a club in which he remained firm until 1977. That year he joined Hércules CF, where he stayed until 1979. In 1979 Verde moved to England to join the ranks of Sheffield United, where he ended his career as a professional footballer in 1980.

In his playing career he scored 26 goals in 200 games.

== International career ==
Verde represented the Argentina national team three times.

== Personal life ==
Pedro Verde is the uncle of former footballer Juan Sebastián Verón.
