= Ariel Beltramo =

Argentine footballer

Personal information
- Full name: Ariel Ceferino Beltramo Morra
- Date of birth: August 20, 1969 (age 57)
- Place of birth: Brinkmann, Córdoba, Argentina
- Position: Forward

Youth career
- Talleres

Senior career*
Years	Team	Apps	(Gls)
1985–1986	Talleres	2	(0)
1986–1992	River Plate	9	(1)
1988–1989	→ Estudiantes LP (loan)	0	(0)
1989–1990	→ Lanús (loan)	28	(8)
1991–1992	→ Deportivo Armenio (loan)	16	(10)
1992–1993	Universidad de Chile	49	(20)
1994	Universitario	3	(0)
1995	Gimnasia LP	5	(0)
1996	Palestino	23	(9)
1997–1998	Municipal	17	(10)
1998	Deportes Tolima	17	(6)
1999–2000	Maccabi Ahi Nazareth	31	(10)
2000	Francavilla	17	(10)
2001	Chieti	5	(0)
2001–2003	Camerino	55	(29)
2003–2004	Biagio Nazzaro	20	(15)
2004–2005	Torrese	10	(7)
2006–2008	Ostra	23	(17)
2008–2009	Monteluponese		
- * Club domestic league appearances and goals

Ariel Ceferino Beltramo Morra (born August 20, 1969) is an Argentine former professional footballer who played as a forward for clubs in Argentina, Chile, Peru, Italy, Israel, Colombia and Guatemala.

== Playing career ==
Beltramo started his career with Talleres de Córdoba before joining River Plate.

== Coaching career ==
Beltramo has had football academies in Argentina and worked as a coach and instructor for youth players in Chile.
