= C.D. Arturo Fernández Vial =

Association football club

Fernández Vial
- Full name: Corporación Club Deportivo; Arturo Fernández Vial
- Nicknames: La maquina aurinegra Vialinos; Aurinegros; El inmortal Vialito
- Founded: 3 June 1903; 123 years ago
- Ground: Estadio Ester Roa; Concepción, Chile
- Capacity: 30,448
- Chairman: Ángelo Castiglione
- Manager: Claudio Rojas
- League: Tercera B
- 2020: Segunda División, 1st (promoted)
Home colours	Away colours

Corporación Club Deportivo Arturo Fernández Vial is a football club in Chile, from the Concepción area, in the Bio-Bio Region. The team was founded on June 3, 1903, and they currently play in the fifth level of Chilean football, the Tercera B.

Arturo Fernández Vial identifies itself since its beginning with the national corporation of railroad workers, and it was the most popular team in southern Chile. Its traditional rival is Deportes Concepción. Also, the team's "hinchada" (die-hard supporters) are known as La Furia Guerrera.

== History ==
In the year 1897, the football club Internacional de Concepción was founded. This predecessor institution reunited the local residents that worked for the State Railway at the time.

In May 1903, a strike was declared by the harbor workers in the city of Valparaíso which unchained violent scenes in the city, even bringing it to a state of street curfew. In the midst of the deliberations, admiral Arturo Fernández Vial, ex director of Territorio Marítimo (Maritime Territory) and survivor of the Battle of Iquique, decided to intervene before court, trying to settle the problem, and achieving such goal.

Such an act generated admiration, and because of his work, the football club Internacional decided on June 15 of 1903, change its name to Club Deportivo Ferroviario Almirante Arturo Fernández Vial.

The team Vial stood out since its beginning by its high degree of organization. It had its own field right next to the Bio-Bio riverbank, in the area known as Chepe. Its statutes accepted members from all nationalities, but Chileans were preferred. The membership fee was of two Chilean pesos at the time and a monthly fee of one peso. As for its clothing, it had yellow soccer cleats, black short socks, special shin guards, white pants, a sealing wax belt, a striped black and white jersey, and a cap of the same color. In the beginning, Internacional was like a miniature Colo-Colo, a great diffuser of football between the years 1897 and 1903, promoting this sport mainly in the towns near Concepción.

The first great victory for the máquina aurinegra (yellow and black locomotive) came in 1910, in a historic match that took place in the 120 stop of the old trams that went from Concepción through Talcahuano, the vialinos ended the regional dominance of until then undefeated Concepción United. That afternoon, the loud whistles from the steam locomotives deafened the city's downtown.

In the year 1981, Vial decides to play in the newly created Tercera División (Third Division) becoming champions and obtaining promotion to Chile's Segunda Division (Second Division). With almost the same squad, Vial repeats the deed the following season and becomes champion of the Second Division in 1982 with 56 points; This milestone helps make the southern dreams come true. After 80 years, Club Ferroviario Almirante Arturo Fernández Vial (a popular institution in the southern side of Chile) makes their debut on the Chilean First Division and is the first team in the history of the national football league to go from Third Division to First Division in two years. Up to now, no other professional football club has done such accomplishment.

Recently, Vial is going through economical issues that are affecting the team's performance. Nevertheless, with the team playing in Chile's lower levels for the last 20 years, without achieving anything important, the team's biggest support throughout these years of uncertainty has come from the hinchada (supporters).

== Uniform ==
- Home Uniform: Yellow Jersey with vertical black stripes, black shorts, black socks.
- Away Uniform: Black Jersey, black shorts, black socks.

== Stadium ==
Estadio Municipal de Concepción Alcaldesa Ester Roa, located in Concepción, Chile.

== Notable players ==
- (Argentina) (Chile) Rubén Dundo
- (Argentina) Mario Kempes
- (Chile) Jorge Carrasco
- (Chile) Luis Ceballos
- (Chile) Luis Chavarría
- (Chile) Pedro Jaque
- (Chile) Bartolo Muñoz
- (Chile) Horacio Muñoz
- (Chile) Pablo Yoma
- (Chile) Arturo Sanhueza
- (Chile) Gerson Valle
- (Chile) Luis Zambrano
- (Chile) Richard Zambrano
- (Uruguay) (Chile) Nelson Acosta
- (Uruguay) Gustavo Biscayzacú

== National honours ==
=== League Titles ===
- Segunda División (II): 1

1982

- Tercera División (III): 1

1981

- Tercera División A (IV): 1

2013

=== Cup Titles ===
- Apertura Tercera División (Fourth Level): 1

2013

== Managers ==
Interim coaches appear in italics.

- (Chile) Francisco Stuardo (1925)
- (Chile) Álex Veloso (1981)
- (Argentina) Miguel Ángel Ruiz (1982)
- (Chile) Antonio Vargas (1982)
- (Chile) Hernán Godoy (1983)
- (Chile) Antonio Vargas (1984)
- (Chile) Humberto Cruz (1984)
- (Uruguay) (Chile) Nelson Acosta (1984–1988)
- (Chile) Manuel Rodríguez Vega (1988–1989)
- (Chile) Antonio Vargas (1989)
- (Argentina) Miguel Ángel Ruiz (1990)
- (Chile) Justo Farrán (1990)
- (Chile) Germán Cornejo (1990)
- (Chile) Eduardo Cortázar (1991–1992)
- (Chile) Sergio Gutiérrez (1993)
- (Chile) Germán Cornejo (1994)
- (Argentina) Pedro Lucio Olivera (1995)
- (Chile) Justo Farrán (1996)
- (Chile) Eduardo Cortázar (1996–1997)
- (Chile) Edgardo Avilés (1998–1999)
- (Uruguay) Ricardo Ortiz (2000)
- (Argentina) Pedro Lucio Olivera (2001–2002)
- (Chile) Jorge Rodríguez (2003)
- (Chile) Eduardo Cortázar (2003)
- (Chile) Edgardo Avilés (2004)
- (Chile) Alberto Cisternas (2004)
- (Chile) Luis Santibáñez (2005)
- (Chile) Luis Ceballos (2005)
- (Chile) Germán Cornejo (2006)
- (Chile) Guillermo Páez (2006)
- (Chile) Leonardo Vinés (2006–2007)
- (Uruguay) Ricardo Ortiz (2007–2008)
- (Chile) José Toledo (2008)
- (Chile) Carlos González (2008)
- (Chile) Eduardo Apablaza (2009)
- (Chile) Osvaldo Hidalgo (2009)
- (Chile) José Toledo (2009)
- (Chile) Eduardo de la Barra (2010)
- (Chile) Yuri Fernández (2010)
- (Chile) Jorge Rodríguez (2011)
- (Argentina) Pablo Abraham (2012)
- (Chile) Nibaldo Rubio (2012)
- (Chile) Erwin Durán (2013)
- (Chile) José Toledo (2016)
- (Chile) Ramón Climent (2016)
- (Chile) Edgardo Abdala (2016)
- (Chile) Felipe Cornejo (2017–2018)
- (Argentina) Esteban Fuertes (2018)
- (Argentina) Cristian Molins (2018)
- (Chile) Roberto Muñoz (2018)
- (Chile) Erwin Durán (2019)
- (Chile) Jorge Garcés (2019–2020)
- (Chile) Claudio Rojas (2020–2022)
- (Chile) Patricio Lira (2022)
- (Chile) Claudio Rojas] (2022)
- (Chile) Jonathan Orellana (2023)
- (Chile) Osvaldo Cataldo (2024)
- (Chile) Sebastián Ortiz (2025)
- (Chile) José Toledo (2025)
- (Chile) José Zapata (2026–Present)
