= Deportes Temuco =

Chilean football club

- Full name: Club de Deportes Temuco S.A.D.P.
- Nicknames: El cuadro de la Cruz de Malta; El Pije; León de Ñielol
- Founded: 1960
- Ground: Estadio Municipal Germán Becker
- Capacity: 18,100
- Chairman: Marcelo Salas
- Manager: Emiliano Astorga
- League: Primera B
- 2025: Primera B, 12th of 16
Home colours	Away colours	Third colours

Club de Deportes Temuco is a Chilean football club based in Temuco, Araucanía Region. It currently plays in the Chilean Primera División B, holding home games at the new Estadio Municipal Germán Becker.

The club was founded on February 22, 1960, as Deportes Temuco and again on March 20, 1965, after a merger with Green Cross. Until 1984, the club was known as Green Cross – Temuco, and, in 2007, changed its name to Deportivo Temuco, only on that season.

In 2013, the club merged with Unión Temuco, but the name of Deportes Temuco was kept, along with the logo and traditional white and green colors, making it seem as Deportes Temuco absorbing Unión rather than a fusion. Thanks to the fusion though, Deportes Temuco left the Segunda División and returned to Primera B for season 2013–14, using Unión Temuco's place in that league.

== Stadium ==
Deportes Temuco's current stadium is the Estadio Municipal Germán Becker, a renovated 18,500 football stadium located at the "Pablo Neruda" street in Temuco, leased from Temuco City Municipality since 1965.

Deportes Temuco have also used other grounds during their history;

The Estadio Liceo de Hombres de Temuco, was Deportes Temuco's home from 1963 until the end of the 1964 season.

The club had also played their official home games at the Estadio Municipal de Gorbea & Estadio Municipal de Lautaro when the G. Becker Stadium was re-built, in 2008.

In 2011 due to the poor condition of the G. Becker Stadium, the club had look again for an alternative stadium to play their home matches; this time D. Temuco played at the Estadio Pueblo Nuevo de Temuco

In 2015 the G. Becker Stadium went on to repairs again, in this occasion, in order to receive the Copa America's games in perfect condition. This time the Estadio Municipal de Villarrica and the Estadio Municipal de Victoria, were the "albi-verdes" choice to play their home matches. They also played one Copa Chile 2015 home game at the Estadio Alberto Larraguibel de Angol.

== Honours ==
- Primera B: 3

1991, 2001, 2015–16

- Copa Apertura Segunda División: 1

1987

=== Seasons ===
- 1 Participation in Copa Sudamericana (2018)
- 31 seasons in First Level (Primera División) (1965–1980, 1983–1984, 1992–1998, 2002–2005, 2016/17–2018)
- 18 seasons in Second Level (Primera B) (1963–1964, 1981–1982, 1986–1991, 2000–2001, 2006–2007, 2013/14-2015/16, 2019–)
- 6 seasons in Third Level (Segunda & Tercera) (2008–2011) & (2012–2013)

== South American cups history ==
Season	Competition	Round	Opponent	Away	Home	Aggregate
2018	Copa Sudamericana	First	(Venezuela) Estudiantes de Mérida	1–1	2–0	3–1
2018	Copa Sudamericana	Second	(Argentina) San Lorenzo	0–3^	1–0	1–3

^ CONMEBOL awarded San Lorenzo a 3–0 win as a result of D. Temuco fielding an ineligible player. Originally, D. Temuco won the match 1–2.

== Records ==
- Record Primera División victory — 8–0 v. Santiago Morning (1969)
- Record Primera División defeat — 0–9 v. Palestino (1998)
- Record Copa Chile victory — 9–1 v. Fernández Vial (1993)
- Most goals scored (Primera División matches) — 50, Víctor González (1969–72, 1974–78)
- Most goals scored in a league season (Primera División matches) — 25, Luis Ramos (1978)
- Highest home attendance — 32,551 v. Colo-Colo (3 December 1972)
- Primera División Best Position — 3rd (1969)
- Copa Chile Best Season — Semifinals (1984, 1998)

== Current squad ==
Current squad of Deportes Temuco as of 7 August 2026 (edit)
Sources: ANFP Official Site

No.		Position	Player
1	CHI	GK	Juan Garrido
2	CHI	MF	Vicente Garrido
3	CHI	DF	Miguel Sanhueza
4	CHI	DF	Frank Valenzuela
5	ARG	DF	Enzo Lettieri
6	CHI	MF	Paulo Contreras
7	CHI	FW	Maximiliano Torrealba
8	CHI	MF	Brayan Troncoso
9	URU	FW	Luis Acevedo
10	CHI	FW	Sebastián Molina
11	CHI	FW	Felipe Reynero
12	CHI	FW	Cristian Rocha
13	CHI	GK	Yerko Urra (c)
15	CHI	FW	Brayan Valdivia
16	CHI	MF	Nicolás Rivera
17	CHI	DF	Franco Ortega

No.		Position	Player
18	ARG	MF	Diego Buonanotte
19	URU	FW	Diego Sánchez
21	CHI	DF	Diego Zambrano
22	CHI	MF	Mathiias Ithal
23	CHI	DF	Rodrigo González
24	CHI	MF	Julio Velásquez
25	CHI	FW	Sebastián Campos
26	CHI	DF	Gabriel Pinochet
27	URU	MF	Camilo Núñez
28	CHI	DF	Luis Casanova
29	CHI	FW	César Huanca
30	CHI	MF	Nicolás Astete
32	CHI	MF	Nicolás Pérez
33	CHI	GK	Benjamín Quintún
35	CHI	DF	Brian Torrealba
37	CHI	MF	Franco Gutiérrez

Manager: Emiliano Astorga

=== 2025 Summer Transfers ===
==== In ====
Note: Flags indicate national team as defined under FIFA eligibility rules; some limited exceptions apply. Players may hold more than one non-FIFA nationality.

No.	Pos.	Nation	Player
4	DF	ARG	Federico Pereyra (from San Luis)
5	DF	ARG	Enzo Lettieri (from Agropecuario)
8	MF	CHI	Brayan Troncoso (from Deportes Puerto Montt)
14	MF	CHI	Nicolás Orrego (from Cobreloa)
16	FW	CHI	Roberto Riveros (from Deportes Recoleta)

No.	Pos.	Nation	Player
23	MF	ARG	Juan Jaime (from Deportes Copiapó)
28	DF	CHI	Maximiliano Torrealba (from Ñublense)
30	MF	ARG	Diego Buonanotte (from O'Higgins F.C.)
31	DF	CHI	Stefano Magnasco (from Unión Española)

==== Out ====
Note: Flags indicate national team as defined under FIFA eligibility rules; some limited exceptions apply. Players may hold more than one non-FIFA nationality.

No.	Pos.	Nation	Player
5	DF	CHI	Vicente Concha (to Ponte Preta)
6	DF	CHI	Diego Sobarzo (to Malleco Unido)
11	MF	URU	Matías Abisab (to Blooming)
14	MF	CHI	Matías Andrades (released)
15	FW	CHI	Camilo Melivilú (to San Marcos de Arica)
20	MF	CHI	Franco Cortés (to Santiago Morning)

No.	Pos.	Nation	Player
21	DF	CHI	Joaquin Lopez (to Concón National)
23	DF	CHI	Víctor González (to Santiago Wanderers)
29	FW	CHI	Zederick Vega (to Santiago City FC)
30	MF	CHI	Byron Bustamante (to Cobreloa)
32	FW	CHI	Gustavo Castro (to Provincial Osorno)
34	FW	URU	Diego Sánchez (to Albion F.C.)

=== Out on loan ===
Note: Flags indicate national team as defined under FIFA eligibility rules; some limited exceptions apply. Players may hold more than one non-FIFA nationality.

No.	Pos.	Nation	Player
—	DF	CHI	Frank Valenzuela (at Provincial Osorno until 31 December 2025)
—	DF	CHI	Lukas Neculhueque (at Brujas de Salamanca until 31 December 2025)

No.	Pos.	Nation	Player
—	MF	ARG	Félix Triñanes (at Cobresal until 31 December 2025)
—	FW	CHI	Nelson Peñaloza (at Deportes Linares until 31 December 2025)

== Notable players ==
- (Bolivia) Álvaro Peña
- (Chile) Franz Arancibia
- (Chile) Juan Castillo
- (Chile) Carlos Hoffmann
- (Chile) Miguel Latín
- (Chile) Honorino Landa
- (Chile) Cristián Montecinos
- (Chile) Gustavo Poirrier
- (Chile) Nelson Sandoval
- (Uruguay) Marcelo Fracchia

== Coaches ==
- (Argentina) Miguel Mocciola (1965–1966)
- (Chile) Gastón Guevara (1966)
- (Argentina) Martín García (1967)
- (Chile) Gastón Guevara (1967)
- (Chile) Caupolicán Peña (1968–1970)
- (Chile) Gastón Guevara (1970–1981)
- (Chile) Carlos Romero (1981)
- (Chile) Álex Veloso (1982–1982)
- (Chile) Juan Ortíz (1982)
- (Chile) Gastón Guevara (1982–1984)
- (Chile) Iván Ortiz (1984)
- (Argentina) Roque Mercury (1984)
- (Chile) Iván Ortiz (1984–1985)
- (Chile) Ramón Climent (1985)
- (Chile) Juan Poblete (1985–1986)
- (Chile) Washington Villarroel (1986)
- (Chile) Pedro Carmona (1986)
- (Argentina) Roque Mercury (1987)
- (Chile) Eduardo Cortázar (1987)
- (Chile) Alicel Belmar (1988)
- (Chile) Gastón Guevara (1988)
- (Chile) Luciano Mora (1989)
- (Chile) Guillermo Mancilla (1988)
- (Chile) Gastón Guevara (1989)
- (Argentina) Roque Mercury (1990)
- (Chile) Leonel Herrera (1990–1991)
- (Chile) Luis Santibáñez (1991–1992)
- (Paraguay) Cayetano Ré (1992)
- (Chile) Carlos Romero (1992)
- (Chile) Guillermo Páez (1992–1994)
- (Chile) Eduardo Cortázar (1994–1996)
- (Argentina) Roque Mercury (1996)
- (Chile) Jorge Garcés (1996)
- (Argentina) Roque Mercury (1997)
- (Chile) Roberto Álamos (1997)
- (Argentina) Roque Mercury (1997)
- (Argentina) Reinaldo Merlo (1998)
- (Chile) Gastón Guevara (1998)
- (Argentina) César Laraignée (1999)
- (Chile) Carlos Durán (2000)
- (Argentina) Roque Mercury (2001–2002)
- (Chile) Osvaldo Villegas (2003–2004)
- (Chile) Carlos González (2004)
- (Argentina) Claudio Nigretti (2005)
- (Chile) Osvaldo Villegas (2005)
- (Chile) Juan Carlos Gangas (2006)
- (Chile) Gastón Guevara (2006)
- (Chile) Carlos González (2006–2007)
- (Chile) Gastón Guevara (2007)
- (Chile) Eduardo Bonvallet (2007)
- (Chile) Nelson Soto (2008)
- (Argentina) Daniel Zelaya (2009)
- (Chile) Nelson Soto (2009)
- (Chile) John Greig (2009)
- (Chile) Christian Muñoz (2009)
- (Chile) Osvaldo Hidalgo (2010)
- (Chile) Gastón Aravena (2010)
- (Argentina) Daniel Zelaya (2010)
- (Argentina) (Chile) Sergio Vargas (2011)
- (Chile) Eduardo Cortázar (2011)
- (Argentina) Carlos Girardengo (2012)
- (Chile) Víctor Barría (2012)
- (Argentina) Carlos Girardengo (2012)
- (Chile) Francisco Huerta (2013)
- (Chile) Fernando Astengo (2013)
- (Chile) Miguel Latín (2013)
- (Chile) Fernando Vergara (2014)
- (Chile) Marcelo Silva (2014)
- (Argentina) Pablo Abraham (2014–2015)
- (Chile) Luis Landeros (2015–2017)
- (Argentina) Dalcio Giovagnoli (2017–2018)
- (Chile) Miguel Ponce (2018)
- (Chile) Hugo Vilches (2019)
- (Chile) Patricio Lira (2019–2021)
- (Argentina) Cristián Arán (2022)
- (Chile) Fabián Avendaño (2022)
- (Chile) Jorge Aravena (2022)
- (Chile) Fabián Avendaño (2022)
- (Chile) Juan José Ribera (2023)
- (Uruguay) Román Cuello (2023–2024)
- (Chile) Esteban Valencia (2024)
- (Chile) Mario Salas (2025)
- (Chile) Esteban Valencia (2025)
- (Chile) Arturo Sanhueza (2025-2026)
- (Chile) Sebastián Domínguez (2026)
- (Chile) Emiliano Astorga (2026-)

== Shirt sponsors ==
List of Kit Manufacturers

- Kappa (1987)
- Adidas (1990–96)
- Diadora (1996–97)
- Le Coq Sportif (1998)
- Adidas (2000–03)
- Training (2004–06)
- Kappa (2007)
- Lotto (2007–09)
- Training (2010)
- Joma (2011)
- Penalty (2012–13)
- Warrior Sports (2013–14)
- M11 Sports (2014–16)
- Joma (2016–19)
- Capelli Sport (2019-20)
- KS7 (2020-22)
- M11 Sports (2023-2025)
- Macron (2026-)

List of Shirt Sponsors

- Herman Gastellu (1978)
- Igi-Llaima (1979–80)
- El Diario Austral (1981–82)
- UFRO (1985)
- Doble ZZ (1985–87)
- Feria Bernedo (1987)
- Ripley (1990)
- Cerveza Cristal (1991)
- Rosen (1992–94)
- Cerveza Cristal (1994–08)
- Gejman (2009–10)
- Frigorífico Temuco (2011–2013)
- Rosen (2013–)

== See also ==
- Green Cross
