= Hugo Tassara =

Chilean football manager (1924–2016)

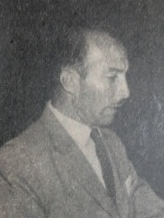
- Tassara in 1957

Personal information
- Full name: Hugo Tassara Olivares
- Date of birth: 14 February 1924
- Place of birth: Iquique, Chile
- Date of death: 12 February 2016 (aged 91)
- Place of death: Alajuela, Costa Rica
- Height: 1.78 m (5 ft 10 in)
- Position: Goalkeeper

Youth career
- Tocopilla (city team)
- María Elena (city team)
- Copiapó (city team)

Senior career*
Years	Team	Apps	(Gls)
- Universidad de Chile

Managerial career
- 1945–1946: Universidad de Chile (youth)
- 1955: Colo-Colo (youth)
- 1956: Colo-Colo (fitness coach)
- 1957–1958: Colo-Colo
- 1959–1960: Alajuelense
- 1960: Costa Rica
- 1961–1962: Palestino
- 1963: Colo-Colo
- 1964: Alajuelense
- 1965: Colo-Colo
- 1966: Defensor Arica
- 1967–1968: Alajuelense
- 1969: Herediano
- 1972–1973: Panama
- 1974: Alajuelense
- 1975: Saprissa (fitness coach)
- 1975: Universidad de Chile
- 1979: Cartaginés
- 1980: Everton
- * Club domestic league appearances and goals

Hugo Tassara Olivares (14 February 1924 – 12 February 2016) was a Chilean football manager.

== Career ==
Born in Iquique, Chile, Tassara had a short career as a football goalkeeper, playing for the teams of Tocopilla, María Elena and Copiapó. At professional level, he was a substitute of Mario Ibáñez for three years in Universidad de Chile. Next, he worked in the youth system of the club and also in the Colo-Colo youth system in 1955.

After managing Colo-Colo in his country of birth, winning two titles in 1958 and 1963, Tassara came to Costa Rica in 1959, joining Alajuelense and winning two consecutive titles in 1959 and 1960. He coached the same team in three other steps, in addition to Herediano in 1969 and Cartaginés in 1979.

He coached the Costa Rica national team and the Panama national team. He has been one of the five Chileans who have managed the Panama national team along with Óscar Rendoll Gómez (1946–47/1951–52), Óscar Suman (1949), Néstor Valdés (1969–1970) and Renato Panay (1976–1977).

He was the first Chilean manager to work in the Peruvian top division, before José Tadormina, Ramón Estay, among others.

In the 1990s and 2000s, he worked as Director of the Herediano youth system.

== Other works ==
In addition to work as a football coach, he also was a fitness coach, instructor, author, normal teacher, PE teacher, sport journalist, football commentator and painter. As a fitness coach, he worked in Colo-Colo and Saprissa.

He graduated as a normal teacher in Copiapó, Chile, and next he studied physical education, beginning his teaching career in María Elena in 1952. As a football coach, he started football academies in Costa Rica, Chile, Colombia, Perú, Venezuela and Guatemala, adding TV instructive programs. In addition, he recorded brief technical lessons for the Costa Rican TV and radio media.

Always in Costa Rica, he worked as a columnist and TV football commentator for local games and FIFA World Cups since 1970, earning the award "Best Football Commentator" in 1993. Previously in Chile, he had worked as a radio sports journalist and became the first Chilean play-by-play commentator after conveying the match Chile versus Switzerland in the 1962 FIFA World Cup.

As an author, he published books focused in teaching for kids such as Una Manera de Pensar el Fútbol (A Way to Plan Football), Realidad y Fantasía del Fútbol Total (Reality and Fantasy of Total Football), Guía Práctica del Fútbol (Football Practical Guide), Fútbol Total (Total Football), Entrenamiento del Niño Futbolista (Football Kid Training) and Fútbol Simplemente (Just Football).

== Personal life ==
Tassara liked to live in Costa Rica because of calm of the country and the behavior of the native people. His children were born in Chile, but they naturalized Costa Rican.

== Honours ==
Colo-Colo

- Copa Chile: 1958
- Primera División de Chile: 1963

Alajuelense

- Primera División de Costa Rica: 1959, 1960
- Campeón de Campeones de Costa Rica: 1967

Individual

- Best Football Commentator of Costa Rica: 1993
