= Rubén Dundo =

Argentine footballer (born 1967)

Personal information
- Full name: Rubén Alberto Dundo
- Date of birth: 16 December 1967 (age 58)
- Place of birth: San Isidro, Buenos Aires, Argentina
- Height: 1.70 m (5 ft 7 in)
- Position: Forward

Youth career
- River Plate

Senior career*
| Years | Team | Apps | (Gls) |
| 1986–1991 | Chaco For Ever | | |
| 1989–1990 | → Nueva Chicago (loan) | | |
| 1992 | Magallanes | | |
| 1993 | Rangers | | |
| 1993 | Deportes Melipilla | 11 | (5) |
| 1994 | Deportes Santa Cruz | | |
| 1994–1995 | Huachipato | | |
| 1995 | Cortuluá | | |
| 1996–1997 | Fernández Vial | 40 | (22) |
| 1997 | Deportes Iquique | 11 | (7) |
| 1998–1999 | Cobresal | | |
| 2000 | Provincial Osorno | | |
| 2000 | Fernández Vial | | |
| 2001 | Deportes Iquique | | |
| 2001 | Audax Italiano | 10 | (1) |
| 2002 | Lota Schwager | | |
- * Club domestic league appearances and goals

Rubén Alberto Dundo (born 16 December 1967) is a former Argentine naturalized Chilean footballer who played for clubs of Argentina and Chile.

== Career ==
As a youth player, Dundo was with River Plate before starting to play at a professional level for Chaco For Ever, but moved to Chile where he would represent 14 clubs, including Magallanes, C.D. Arturo Fernández Vial, Cobresal and Huachipato, before he retired. He scored 40 goals in two seasons with Cobresal.

== Personal life ==
He naturalized Chilean by residence.

Dundo made his home in Chile and has worked as a football coach for the Escuela de Fútbol San Miguel, a football academy in the eponymous commune.

His son, Maxi, who was born in Chile, played football for clubs such as Ferroviarios in Chile and Ital-Inter in Canada.

== Honours ==
Rangers

- Segunda División de Chile: 1993

Deportes Iquique

- Primera B: 1997 Clausura

Cobresal

- Primera B: 1998

Individual

- Primera B Top-scorer: 1998
