= Ramón Estay =

Chilean footballer and manager (1938–2013)

Personal information
- Full name: Luis Ramón Estay Saavedra
- Date of birth: 22 July 1938
- Place of birth: Iquique, Chile
- Date of death: 3 November 2013 (aged 75)
- Place of death: Iquique, Chile
- Position: Forward

Youth career
- CD Cavancha
- Iquique (city team)

Senior career*
Years	Team	Apps	(Gls)
1958–1964	Audax Italiano		
1964–1965	Magallanes		
1966–1967	Deportes Concepción		

Managerial career
- 1969–1972: Magallanes
- 1974: Coquimbo Unido
- 1979–1980: Deportes Iquique
- 1982–1984: Deportes Arica
- 1984: Regional Atacama
- 1985: Deportes Arica
- 1987–1988: Deportes Iquique
- 1990: Deportes Iquique
- 1992: Deportes Iquique
- 1993: Defensor Kiwi-Ciclista Lima
- 1994: Deportes Iquique
- 1994–1995: Ciclista Lima
- 1995: Alianza Lima
- 1995: Deportivo Municipal
- 1996: Melgar
- 1997–1998: Deportivo Quito
- 2001: Deportes Iquique
- 2003: Municipal Iquique
- 2006–2008: Universidad Arturo Prat
- * Club domestic league appearances and goals

Luis Ramón Estay Saavedra (22 July 1938 – 3 November 2013), known as Ramón Estay, was a Chilean football player and manager.

== Career ==
Born in Iquique, as a football forward, he played for Club Deportivo Cavancha and the team of Iquique. At professional level, he played for Audax Italiano, Magallanes and Deportes Concepción.

As a football manager, he was mainly related to his hometown club, Deportes Iquique, since he was involved in its foundation and coached it in seven stints, winning the 1979 Segunda División de Chile and the 1980 Copa Polla Gol.

In Chile, he also coached Magallanes, Deportes Arica and Regional Atacama.

In Peru, where he came recommended by his former assistant Miguel Ángel Arrué, he coached Ciclista Lima from 1993 to 1995, winning the 1993 Segunda División as Defensor Kiwi-Ciclista Lima, Alianza Lima in 1994, Deportivo Municipal in 1995 and Melgar in 1996. As a fact, he became the second Chilean to manage Melgar after José Tadormina. Then, he moved to Ecuador and led Deportivo Quito, reaching the runner-up in the 1997 Ecuadorian Serie A.

From 2006 to 2009, he coached the Arturo Prat University, winning three university national championships of FENAUDE, at the same time the team competed in the Chilean Tercera División.

== Personal life ==
His sons Luis Ramón Jr., the elder, and José Orlando, were professional footballers who played for Deportes Iquique at the end of the 1980s.

In Peru, he was nicknamed Chompita (Little Sweater) and Chompita Ploma (Grey Little Sweater), due to the fact that he used to wear that article of clothing.

He was honored as Hijo Ilustre (Illustrious Son) of Iquique.

Estay died due to an respiratory insufficiency in the Hospital of Iquique.

== Honours ==
=== Manager ===
Deportes Iquique

- Segunda División de Chile: 1979
- Copa Polla Gol: 1980

Defensor Kiwi-Ciclista Lima

- Segunda División de Perú: 1993

Universidad Arturo Prat

- FENAUDE: 2006, 2007, 2008

== Legacy ==
After Estay died, the municipal stadium of Iquique was renamed Estadio Tierra de Campeones Ramón Estay Saavedra.

In 2020 season, the alternative shirt of Deportes Iquique was designed in honor of Estay and Club Deportivo Cavancha.
