= Calpulli Airport =

Airport in Chile

- IATA: none; ICAO: SCPL

Summary
- Airport type: Private
- Serves: Paillaco, Chile
- Elevation AMSL: 755 ft / 230 m
- Coordinates: 40°07′40″S 72°39′42″W

Map
- Location of Calpulli Airport in Chile

Runways
Direction	Length		Surface
Direction	m	ft	Surface
18/36	670	2,198	Gravel
- Source: GCM Google Maps

Calpulli Airport (Spanish: Aeropuerto Calpulli), (ICAO: SCPL) is an airstrip 19 kilometres (12 mi) east of Paillaco, a town in the Los Ríos Region of Chile. The runway is 12 kilometres (7.5 mi) west of Ranco Lake.

== See also ==
- Transport in Chile
- List of airports in Chile
