= Rage (2009 Spanish film) =

2009 romance film by Sebastián Cordero

- Film poster
- Spanish: Rabia
- Directed by: Sebastián Cordero
- Screenplay by: Sebastián Cordero
- Based on: Rabia; 2005 novel by Sergio Bizzio
- Produced by: Guillermo del Toro; Álvaro Augustin; Rodrigo Guerrero; Eneko Lizarraga; Bertha Navarro
- Starring: Martina García; Gustavo Sánchez Parra
- Cinematography: Enrique Chediak
- Edited by: David Gallart
- Music by: Lucio Godoy
- Release date: 11 September 2009 (TIFF)
- Running time: 89 minutes
- Countries: Mexico; Spain
- Language: Spanish

Rage (Spanish: Rabia) is a 2009 Mexican-Spanish romance film directed by Sebastián Cordero.

== Cast ==
- Martina García as Rosa
- Gustavo Sánchez Parra as José María
- Concha Velasco as Sra. Torres
- Xabier Elorriaga as Sr. Torres
- Icíar Bollaín as Marimar
- Àlex Brendemühl as Álvaro
- Yon González as Adrián
