= José Tadormina =

Chilean football manager

Personal information
- Full name: José Tadormina Garrido
- Place of birth: Chile

Managerial career
- Years: Team
- Coronel Bolognesi
- 1973–1974: Melgar
- 1974: Selección del Sur
- 1974–1975: Unión Tumán
- 1975–1976: Cienciano

José Tadormina Garrido was a Chilean football manager who developed his career in Peru.

== Career ==
Tadormina is one of the first Chilean managers to work in the Peruvian top division, the second after Hugo Tassara. He also coached Coronel Bolognesi before the club joined the professional categories.

In the 1973 Torneo Descentralizado, he led Melgar, becoming the first Chilean to do it before Ramón Estay and Miguel Ángel Arrué. Despite they qualified to the final group to compete for the league title, they finally competed for staying at the top level against Atlético Grau and Juan Aurich. In addition, they faced Cienciano by first time in the top division, defeating them by 3–1, in a match later called Clásico del Sur.

In 1974, he coached a team made up by players from Cienciano and Alfonso Ugarte what was called Selección del Sur, in a tour for Bolivia.

From 1974 to 1975, he led Unión Tumán.

In the 1975 Torneo Descentralizado, he led Cienciano, reaching the third to last place.
