= Reumén =

- Interactive map of Reumén
- Coordinates: 39°59′24″S 72°49′58″W
- Region: Los Ríos
- Province: Valdivia
- Municipality: Paillaco
- Commune: Paillaco

Government
  - Type: Municipal
- Elevation: 68 m (223 ft)

Population (2002 census )
  - Total: 947
- Time zone: UTC−04:00 (Chilean Standard)
  - Summer (DST): UTC−03:00 (Chilean Daylight)
- Area code: Country + town = 56 + 63

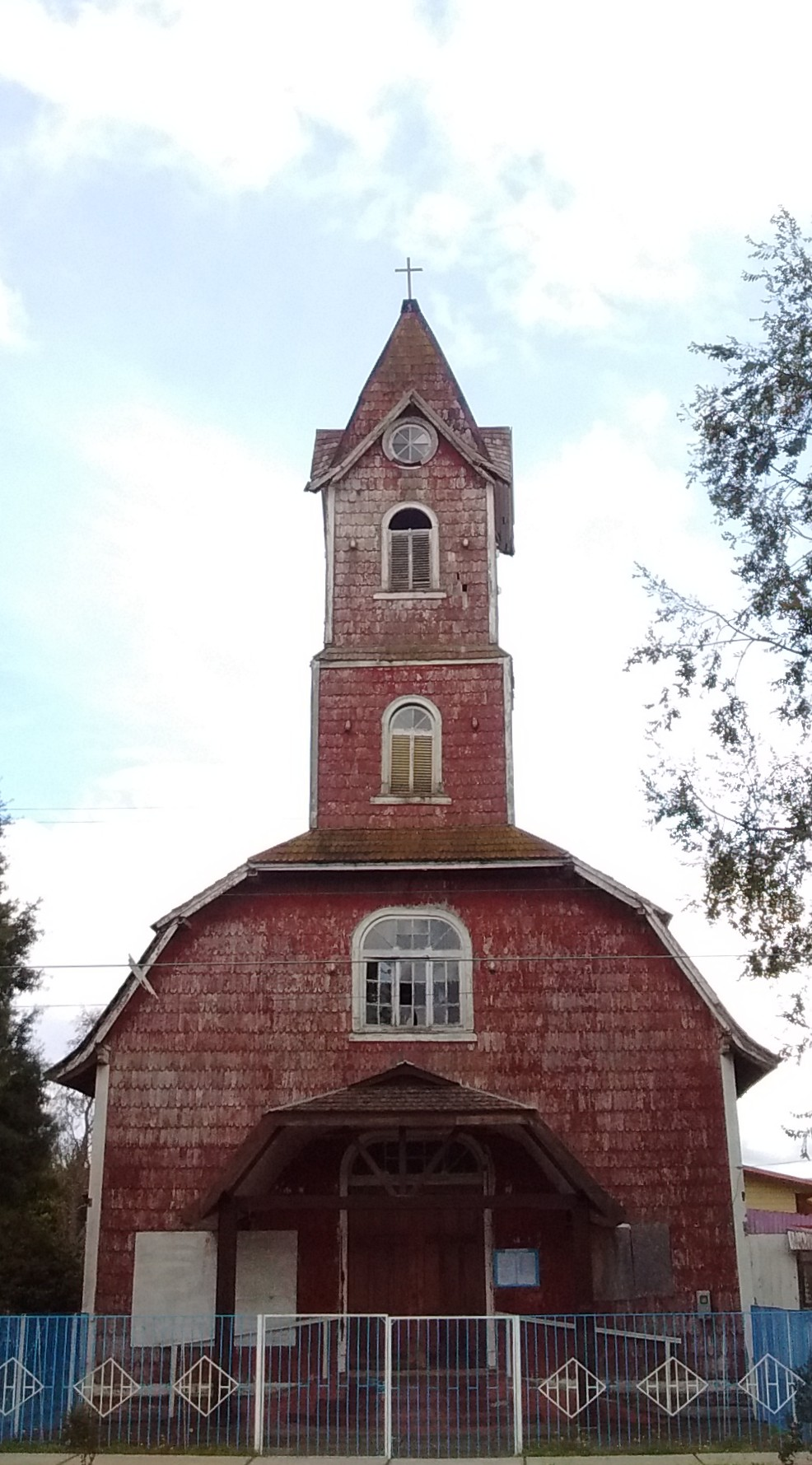
Iglesia Nuestra Señora de Lourdes, Reumén.

Reumén is a village (Spanish: pueblo) located along Chile's Southern Railway about 8 km north of Paillaco. The village is bordered in the southeast by Collilelfu River.
