= Rodrigo Guerrero =

Rodrigo Guerrero may refer to:

- Rodrigo Guerrero (football manager) (born 1986), Chilean football manager
- Rodrigo Guerrero (boxer) (born 1988), Mexican boxer
