= Ramona Reyes =

Chilean politician

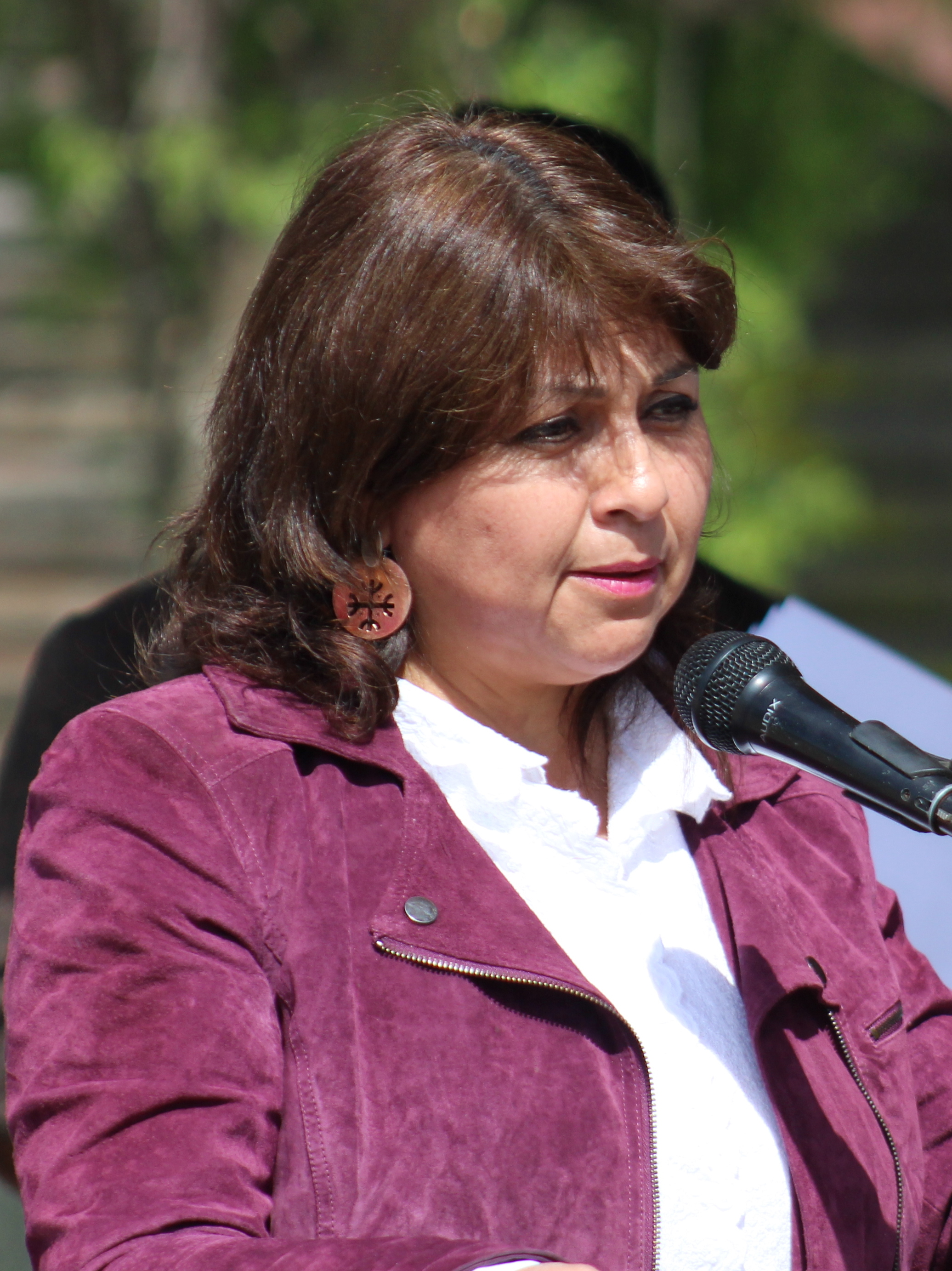
- Ramona Reyes

Member of the Constitutional Convention
- In office 4 July 2021 – 4 July 2022
- Constituency: 24th District

Mayor of Paillaco
- In office 6 December 2008 – February 2021
- Preceded by: Gastón Fuentes
- Succeeded by: Jaime Reyes Durán

Councilwoman of Paillaco
- In office 6 December 2004 – 6 December 2008

Personal details
- Born: 2 April 1967 (age 59) Valdivia, Chile
- Party: Socialist Party
- Education: Austral University of Chile
- Occupation: Politician
- Profession: Midwive

María Ramona Reyes Painequeo (born 2 April 1967) is a Chilean midwife and politician of the Socialist Party of Chile (PS).

She served as a member of the Constitutional Convention, representing the 24th electoral district of the Los Ríos Region. She previously served as a municipal councillor of Paillaco from 2004 to 2008 and as mayor of the same municipality from 2008 to 2020.

== Biography ==
Reyes was born on 2 April 1967. She is the daughter of José Arnoldo Reyes Arévalo and Flora María Painequeo Ancahuail.

She completed her secondary education at Liceo Santa María La Blanca in Valdivia. She later qualified as a midwife at the Austral University of Chile.

She began her professional career in 1994, working as a midwife in rural health posts in the municipality of Paillaco. In 1996, she additionally assumed the position of director of the Municipal Health Department of Paillaco.

== Political career ==
A member of the PS, She served as a municipal councillor of Paillaco between 2004 and 2008 and was elected mayor of the same municipality for three consecutive terms (2008–2012, 2012–2016, and 2016–2020).

Between 2013 and 2017, she served as president of the Association of Municipalities of the Los Ríos Region. In 2016, she became a member of the Association of Municipalities with Mapuche Mayors (AMCAM).

In 2017, she assumed the presidency of the Women and Gender Commission of the Chilean Association of Municipalities, and since 2018 she has been a member of the board of the Ibero-American Network of Municipalities for Gender Equality.

In the elections held on 15–16 May 2021, she ran as a candidate for the Constitutional Convention representing the 24th electoral district of the Los Ríos Region as part of the Lista del Apruebo electoral pact, receiving 12,084 votes (10.6% of the validly cast votes).
