= Dilan Rojas =

Chilean footballer

Personal information
- Full name: Dilan Matías Rojas Barrientos
- Date of birth: 4 June 2004 (age 22)
- Place of birth: Iquique, Chile
- Height: 1.76 m (5 ft 9 in)
- Position: Full-back

Team information
- Current team: Deportes Iquique
- Number: 4

Youth career
- Deportes Iquique

Senior career*
| Years | Team | Apps | (Gls) |
| 2021– | Deportes Iquique | 46 | (1) |
- * Club domestic league appearances and goals as of 27 September 2025

Dilan Matías Rojas Barrientos (born 4 June 2004) is a Chilean footballer who plays as a full-back for Chilean Primera División side Deportes Iquique.

== Club career ==
A product of Deportes Iquique, Rojas made his senior debut in the 0–0 draw against San Luis de Quillota for the Chilean Primera División on 9 May 2021 and got regularity during the 2022 season. With them, he got promotion to the Chilean top level for the 2024 season and scored his first goal in the 4–1 win against Cobreloa on 20 October 2024. He assumed as the team captain by first time, aged 20, in the Copa Chile match against Cobreloa on 10 February 2025 by replacing Edson Puch, aged 20.

A regular player for Deportes Iquique during 2024 and 2025, he also took part in the 2025 Copa Sudamericana. In 2025, he was selected by the CIES Football Observatory as an under-25 promising player for the Chile national team and the ninth best under-21 full-back at world level.
