= Manuel Ossa Ruiz =

Chilean businessperson and politician

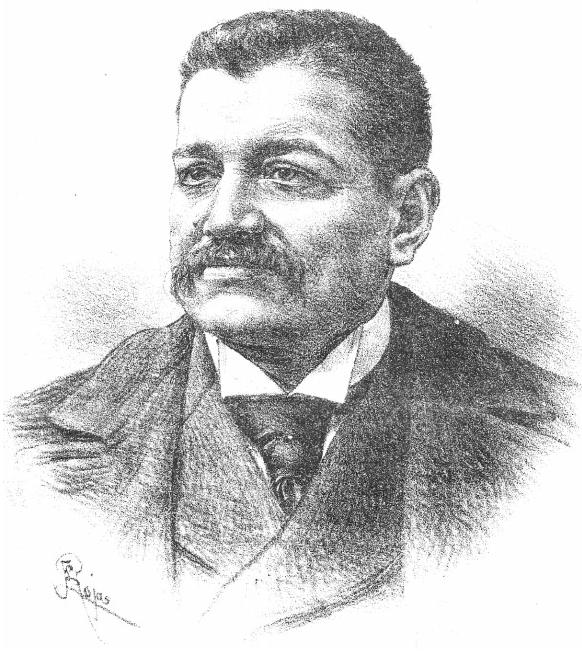
Manuel Ossa.

Manuel Ossa Ruiz (born Freirina, 24 September 1854 – died Viña del Mar, 5 September 1929), was a Chilean businessman and liberal politician.

He was the son of José Santos Ossa Vega and Melchora Ruiz Correa. He was married to Blanca Sainte-Marie Echazarreta.

== Business career ==
He studied his first letters in the city of Cobija, then in Bolivia. In 1867 he was sent to Spain and England, where he studied industrial engineering techniques. On his return, his father asked him to dedicate himself to the family's agricultural activities, on his farm "El Porvenir" in Parral. Here he carried out engineering projects such as the construction of the Longaví irrigation canal and did social and charitable work, such as the construction of the Parral hospital, a workers' club, and a night school.

In 1876 he returned north and after an exploration phase decided to invest in mineral extraction in Caracoles. He went to Peru (1877), where he invested in the Taltal nitrate company and operated the silver mines in Caldera.

In Tocopilla he built the Toco railway. In the south, he built the railway from Osorno to Pichiropulli. But without a doubt, one of his most important works was the construction of the Arica–La Paz railway, a public project commissioned by the government of Chile.

== Parliamentary career ==
He was a member of the Liberal Party of Chile. He was elected Senator by Linares (1897–1903). He was a member of the permanent Finance and Industry Commission, which in August 1900 was renamed the Industry and Public Works Commission.

During his parliamentary work he was concerned with improving the conditions of workers, especially of the working class.

He contributed to the foundation of other railroads in the plains and to new towns in different parts of the national territory; in Valparaíso he also founded a night school for workers.

== Bibliography ==
- Biografías de Chilenos: Miembros de los Poderes Ejecutivos, Legislativo y Judicial (1876–1973); Armando de Ramón Folch; Ediciones Universidad Católica de Chile, Santiago, 1999, volumen 2 (in Spanish).
