= Paillaco =

- City and Commune
- Coat of arms Location of the Commune of Paillaco Location in Chile
- Coordinates: 40°04′S 72°53′W
- Country: Chile
- Region: Los Rios
- Province: Valdivia

Government
  - Type: Municipality
  - Alcalde: Ramona Reyes

Area
  - Total: 896.0 km^{2} (345.9 sq mi)
- Elevation: 68 m (223 ft)

Population (2012 Census)
  - Total: 19,088
  - Density: 21.30/km^{2} (55.18/sq mi)
  - Urban: 9,973
  - Rural: 9,264

Sex
  - Men: 9,620
  - Women: 9,617
- Time zone: UTC−4 (CLT)
  - Summer (DST): UTC−3 (CLST)
- Area code: 56 + 63
- Website: Municipality of Paillaco

Paillaco is a city and commune in southern Chile. It is located in Valdivia Province of Los Ríos Region, and is about 48 km southeast of Valdivia.

== Demographics ==
Historical population
Year	Pop.	±% p.a.
1875	2,363	—
1885	2,985	+2.36%
1895	3,446	+1.45%
1907	4,672	+2.57%
1920	6,241	+2.25%
1930	6,430	+0.30%
1940	9,151	+3.59%
1952	11,380	+1.83%
1970	15,621	+1.78%
1982	18,461	+1.40%
1992	18,152	−0.17%
2002	19,237	+0.58%
2017	20,188	+0.32%
2024	20,942	+0.53%
Source: "Censo de Población y Vivienda". National Statistics Institute.

According to the 2002 census of the National Statistics Institute, Paillaco spans an area of 896 km^{2} (346 sq mi) and has 19,237 inhabitants (9,620 men and 9,617 women). Of these, 9,973 (51.8%) lived in urban areas and 9,264 (48.2%) in rural areas. The population grew by 6% (1,085 persons) between the 1992 and 2002 censuses.

== Administration ==
As a commune, Paillaco is a third-level administrative division of Chile administered by a municipal council, headed by an alcalde who is directly elected every four years. The 2008-2012 alcalde was Ramona Reyes. The council has the following members:

- José Teobaldo Aravena Pérez (PC)
- Ruth Lucy Castillo Prieto (PDC)
- Sergio Orlando Castro Barrera (RN)
- Héctor Alberto Avilés Fuentes (UDI)
- Gabriel Iván Medina Alarcón (PR)
- Gonzalo Rubén Galilea García (RN)

Within the electoral divisions of Chile, Paillaco is represented in the Chamber of Deputies by Enrique Jaramillo (PDC) and Gastón von Mühlenbrock (UDI) as part of the 54th electoral district, together with Panguipulli, Los Lagos, Futrono, Lago Ranco, Río Bueno and La Unión. The commune is represented in the Senate during the 2014–2022 period by Alfonso de Urresti (PS) and Ena von Baer (UDI) as part of the 16th senatorial constituency (Los Ríos Region).

== Education ==
Previously the area had a German school, Deutsche Schule Paillaco.

== See also ==
- Pichirropulli
- Reumén
