= Miguel Ángel Arrué =

Chilean footballer and manager (born 1952)

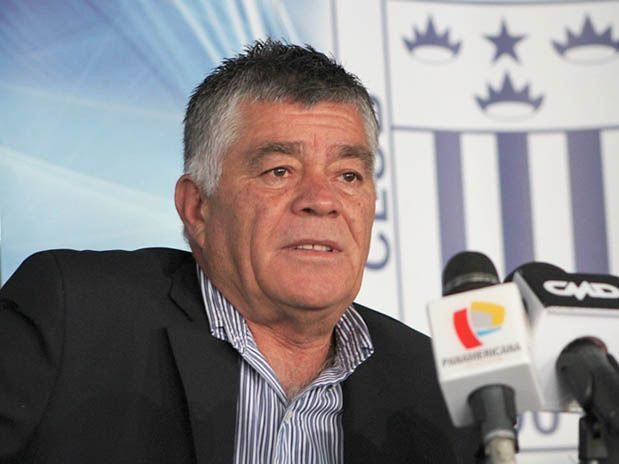
- Arrué in 2011

Personal information
- Full name: Miguel Ángel Arrué Padilla
- Date of birth: 13 August 1952 (age 74)
- Place of birth: Iquique, Chile
- Height: 1.63 m (5 ft 4 in)

Managerial career
- Years: Team
- 1985: Deportes Antofagasta
- 1986: Deportes Antofagasta
- 1987: Deportes Iquique
- 1988: Juventud La Palma
- 1989: Hijos de Yurimaguas
- 1990: Sport Boys
- 1990–1991: Hijos de Yurimaguas
- 1992: Deportivo Yurimaguas
- 1992: Alianza Lima
- 1994: Alianza Lima
- 1994–1995: Deportivo Sipesa
- 1996: Sport Boys
- 1997: Deportivo Quito
- 1997–1998: Sporting Cristal
- 1998: Melgar
- 1999: Deportes Iquique
- 2000–2001: Real Zacatecas
- 2002: Everton
- 2003–2004: Melgar
- 2005–2006: Manzanillo
- 2007–2008: Alianza Lima
- 2008–2009: Manzanillo
- 2009–2010: Indonesia (youth)
- 2010: América Manzanillo
- 2011: Alianza Lima
- 2014: Pacífico
- 2015–2016: Santiago Morning
- 2019: Pirata FC

Miguel Ángel Arrué Padilla (born 13 August 1952) is a Chilean football manager and former player.

== Career ==
Born in Iquique, as a football player, he played in Chile and abroad for three years.

He has had a career as a football manager in Chile, Peru, Ecuador, Indonesia and Mexico. Despite he is Chilean, in Chile he just has coached Deportes Antofagasta, Deportes Iquique, Everton and Santiago Morning.

His first team abroad was Juventud La Palma in the Peruvian Segunda División to which he came in 1988. In Peru he also coached Hijos de Yurimaguas (later Deportivo Yurimaguas), Sport Boys, Alianza Lima, Deportivo Sipesa, Sporting Cristal, Melgar, Pacífico and Pirata FC, what was his last club.

Along with Hijos de Yurimaguas, he won the 1990 Peruvian Segunda División. In Deportivo Sipesa, he allowed the professional debut of Claudio Pizarro. He is a well remembered coach of Alianza Lima after coached it four times, even suggesting the signing of Ramón Estay as manager, with whom he had worked in Deportes Iquique as an assistant.

In Peru he also worked as General Manager of both the Alianza Lima youth system and club Ingenia Fútbol in the Primera División of Chiclayo.

In Ecuador he coached Deportivo Quito. In Mexico, he coached both Real Sociedad de Zacatecas and Manzanillo (later América Manzanillo). He also coached an Indonesia youth team until 2010.

== Personal life ==
In Peru he has been honored as Hijo Ilustre (Illustrious Son) of two cities and a football field in Huacho was given his name.

He is the father of both Franco Arrué, a Chilean football referee and Claudio Arrué, a fitness coach who has worked along with him.

== Honours ==
Hijos de Yurimaguas

- Peruvian Segunda División: 1990

Manzanillo

- Liga TDP: 2006 Clausura
