= Pichirropulli =

Pichirropuli
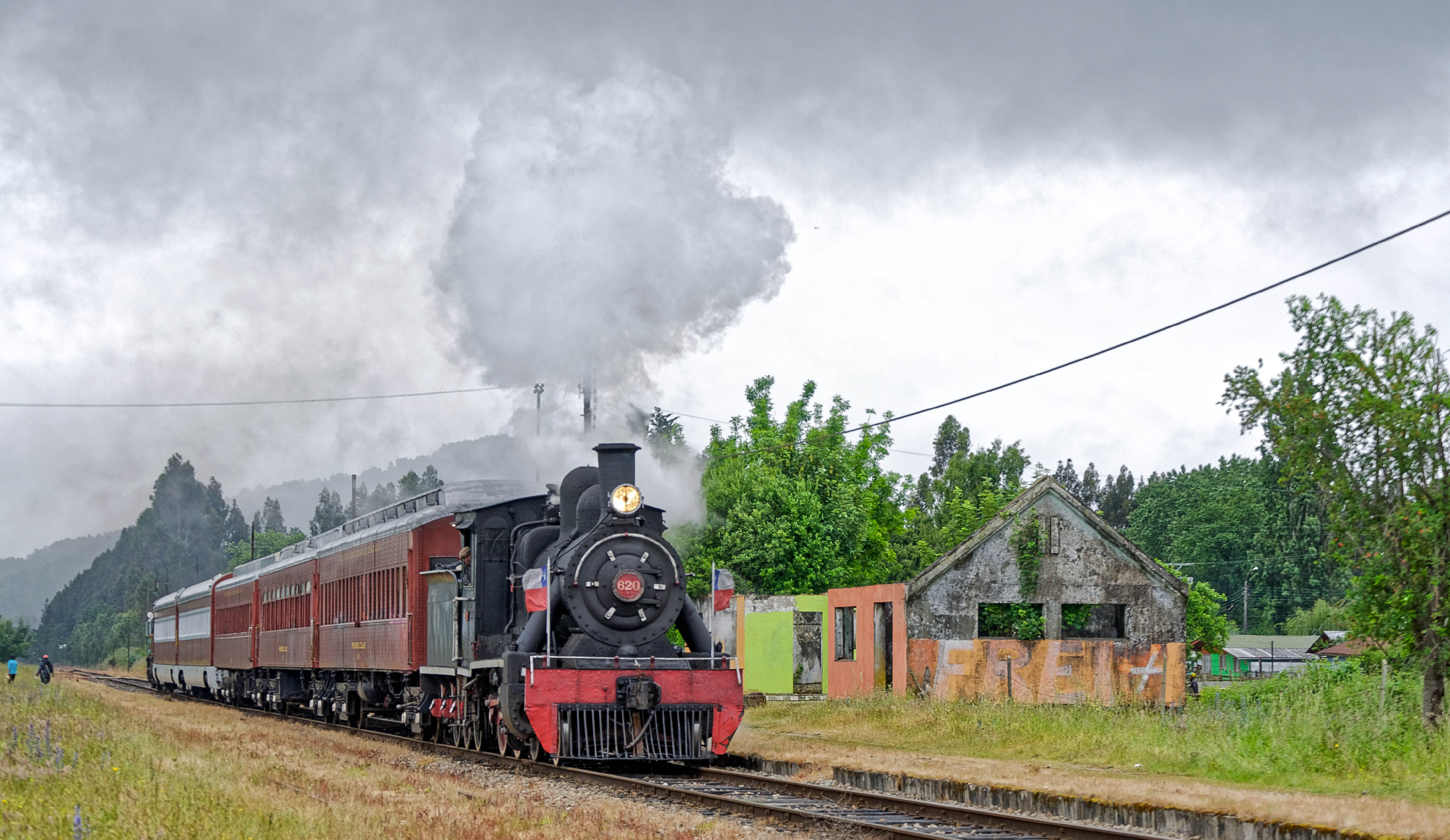
- Interactive map of Pichirropuli
- Coordinates: 40°09′05″S 72°53′52″W
- Region: Los Ríos
- Province: Valdivia
- Municipality: Paillaco
- Commune: Paillaco

Government
  - Type: Municipal
- Elevation: 90 m (300 ft)

Population (2002 census )
  - Total: 728
- Time zone: UTC−04:00 (Chilean Standard)
  - Summer (DST): UTC−03:00 (Chilean Daylight)
- Area code: Country + town = 56 + 63

Pichirropulli is a village (Spanish: aldea) located in the Chilean Central Valley just at the foothills of the Chilean Coast Range. The village belongs to the Commune of Paillaco.
