= 1979 Campeonato Nacional Segunda División =

Segunda División
- Season: 1979
- Champions: Deportes Iquique
- Promoted: Deportes Iquique; Magallanes
- Relegated: None

The 1979 Segunda División de Chile was the 28th season of the Segunda División de Chile.

Deportes Iquique was the tournament's champion.

== Table ==
Pos	Team	Pld	W	D	L	GF	GA	GD	Pts	Promotion or qualification
1	Deportes Iquique (C)	38	23	8	7	66	40	+26	54	Champions. Promoted to 1978 Primera División de Chile
2	Magallanes (P)	38	21	9	8	63	38	+25	51	Promoted to 1978 Primera División de Chile
3	Deportes Arica	38	17	14	7	76	50	+26	49 (Note: Awarded 1 bonus point.)	1977 Primera División de Chile promotion/relegation playoffs
4	Independiente de Cauquenes	38	19	10	9	71	46	+25	48	1977 Primera División de Chile promotion/relegation playoffs
5	San Luis de Quillota	38	19	9	10	63	42	+21	48	
6	San Antonio Unido	38	16	11	11	64	55	+9	43	
7	Unión La Calera	38	15	12	11	48	44	+4	42	
8	Huachipato	38	15	10	13	50	49	+1	42 (Note: Awarded 2 bonus points.)	
9	Trasandino	38	13	14	11	47	44	+3	40	
10	Deportes Ovalle	38	12	14	12	58	59	−1	39	
11	Deportes Colchagua	38	13	10	15	54	57	−3	36	
12	Malleco Unido	38	13	10	15	55	71	−16	36	
13	Deportes La Serena	38	13	8	17	51	52	−1	34	
14	Iberia	38	13	8	17	53	59	−6	34	
15	Deportes Antofagasta	38	12	9	17	64	73	−9	33	
16	Rangers	38	11	10	17	53	57	−4	32	
17	Ferroviarios	38	9	11	18	50	78	−28	29	
18	Curicó Unido	38	8	10	20	43	67	−24	26	
19	Unión San Felipe	38	7	11	20	46	71	−25	25	
20	Linares Unido	38	7	10	21	35	58	−23	24	

Source: rsssf.com
(C) Champions; (P) Promoted

== See also ==
- Chilean football league system
