= 1997 Torneo Clausura (Primera B de Chile) =

Primera B de Chile
- Season: 1997
- Champions: Deportes Iquique
- Promoted: Deportes Iquique; Everton
- Relegated: Unión Santa Cruz
- Top goalscorer: Enrique Ferraro (12)

The 1997 Torneo Clausura was part of the 47th completed season of the Primera B de Chile.

Deportes Iquique was tournament’s champion.

== League table ==
| Pos | Team | Pld | W | D | L | GF | GA | GD | Pts |
|---|---|---|---|---|---|---|---|---|---|
| 1 | Deportes Iquique | 15 | 10 | 3 | 2 | 35 | 20 | +15 | 33 |
| 2 | Everton | 15 | 10 | 2 | 3 | 32 | 18 | +14 | 32 |
| 3 | O'Higgins | 15 | 8 | 6 | 1 | 28 | 17 | +11 | 30 |
| 4 | Santiago Morning | 15 | 8 | 3 | 4 | 23 | 19 | +4 | 27 |
| 5 | Rangers | 15 | 7 | 5 | 3 | 22 | 13 | +9 | 26 |
| 6 | Cobresal | 15 | 7 | 2 | 6 | 41 | 25 | +16 | 23 |
| 7 | Deportes Ovalle | 15 | 6 | 4 | 5 | 22 | 21 | +1 | 22 |
| 8 | Deportes Melipilla | 15 | 6 | 2 | 7 | 18 | 24 | −6 | 20 |
| 9 | Unión San Felipe | 15 | 5 | 3 | 7 | 21 | 31 | −10 | 18 |
| 10 | Regional Atacama | 15 | 5 | 2 | 8 | 21 | 24 | −3 | 17 |
| 11 | Magallanes | 15 | 5 | 2 | 8 | 19 | 24 | −5 | 17 |
| 12 | Deportes Linares | 15 | 5 | 2 | 8 | 24 | 32 | −8 | 17 |
| 13 | Fernández Vial | 15 | 4 | 2 | 9 | 17 | 23 | −6 | 14 |
| 14 | Deportes Arica | 15 | 4 | 2 | 9 | 22 | 31 | −9 | 14 |
| 15 | Ñublense | 15 | 4 | 2 | 9 | 14 | 29 | −15 | 14 |
| 16 | Unión Santa Cruz | 15 | 3 | 4 | 8 | 17 | 25 | −8 | 13 |

== Annual table ==
| Pos | Team | Pld | W | D | L | GF | GA | GD | Pts | Relegation |
|---|---|---|---|---|---|---|---|---|---|---|
| 1 | Everton | 30 | 22 | 4 | 4 | 66 | 30 | +36 | 70 | |
| 2 | Deportes Iquique | 30 | 21 | 4 | 5 | 70 | 35 | +35 | 67 | |
| 3 | Rangers | 30 | 19 | 7 | 4 | 53 | 23 | +30 | 64 | |
| 4 | O'Higgins | 30 | 16 | 8 | 6 | 49 | 38 | +11 | 56 | |
| 5 | Santiago Morning | 30 | 14 | 7 | 9 | 50 | 44 | +6 | 49 | |
| 6 | Cobresal | 30 | 13 | 7 | 10 | 71 | 48 | +23 | 46 | |
| 7 | Fernández Vial | 30 | 10 | 8 | 12 | 41 | 42 | −1 | 38 | |
| 8 | Deportes Melipilla | 30 | 11 | 5 | 14 | 34 | 45 | −11 | 38 | |
| 9 | Deportes Arica | 30 | 10 | 6 | 14 | 46 | 54 | −8 | 36 | |
| 10 | Deportes Linares | 30 | 10 | 6 | 14 | 44 | 52 | −8 | 36 | |
| 11 | Deportes Ovalle | 30 | 7 | 11 | 12 | 29 | 36 | −7 | 32 | |
| 12 | Regional Atacama | 30 | 9 | 4 | 17 | 39 | 57 | −18 | 31 | |
| 13 | Unión San Felipe | 30 | 8 | 6 | 16 | 37 | 63 | −26 | 30 | |
| 14 | Magallanes | 30 | 8 | 4 | 18 | 42 | 58 | −16 | 28 | |
| 15 | Ñublense | 30 | 6 | 7 | 17 | 37 | 67 | −30 | 25 | |
| 16 | Unión Santa Cruz | 30 | 4 | 11 | 15 | 29 | 45 | −16 | 23 | Relegated to Tercera División de Chile |
