= Deportes Iquique =

Association football club in Chile

- Full name: Club de Deportes Iquique S.A.D.P.
- Nickname: Los Dragones Celestes (The Sky Blue Dragons)
- Founded: 21 May 1978; 48 years ago
- Ground: Estadio Tierra de Campeones, Iquique
- Capacity: 13,171
- Chairman: Césare Rossi
- Coach: Rodrigo Guerrero
- League: Primera B
- 2025: Liga de Primera, 15th of 16 (relegated)
- Website: www.clubdeportesiquique.com
Home colours	Away colours

Club de Deportes Iquique S.A.D.P. is a Chilean professional football club based in Iquique, currently playing in the Chilean Primera División. Founded in 1978, the club's home stadium is the Estadio Tierra de Campeones, which has a 13,171 capacity.

Iquique has spent 19 seasons in the Primera División, its longest spell lasting ten years (1980–90). The team has spent 13 seasons in Primera B and four in the third-tier Tercera División. Among its titles, Iquique has won three Copa Chile titles (1980, 2010 and 2013–14).

They have a local rivalry with San Marcos de Arica, disputing the derby since early 1980s.

== History ==
The team was founded on 21 May 1978 by the merger of Cavancha and Estrella de Chile. The following year Iquique competed in the Segunda División, winning it and securing promotion to the Campeonato Nacional.

In its first season at top level, the club finished in 14th place out of eighteen teams and won the Copa Polla Gol, beating Colo-Colo in the final at the Estadio Nacional.

Between 1981 and 1987, Iquique remained in mid-table positions. In 1988, they reached the qualifying stages of the 1989 Copa Libertadores after finishing in third place in the league. However, they lost to Colo-Colo in the final of the qualification tournament. That season, Juan José Oré was the tournament's leading goalscorer with eighteen goals.

In 1991, following a poor campaign where the team finished in the bottom of the table, they were relegated to the second division. They returned to the top flight for one season in 1993, and again for two seasons in 1997. However, in 2002, the club was relegated to the third division and then declared bankruptcy. It was relaunched as Municipal Iquique.

During its four-year presence in the third division, the club saw the rise of Chilean international Edson Puch, a key player in their title win of 2006. Two years later, Iquique reached its fourth promotion to the top division, beating Coquimbo Unido in the promotion playoffs. During the 2009 Apertura, Puch was transferred to Universidad de Chile and Cristian Bogado to Colo-Colo. The club only obtained nine points during the second half of the season, and finished bottom of the table to be relegated to the second division.

In 2010, Iquique won its third second division title and its second Copa Chile title, securing qualification for the 2011 Copa Sudamericana. In their first ever continental tournament, the club was eliminated in the preliminary stage by Universidad Católica. The team finished eleventh in the league.

In 2012, Iquique participated in the Copa Sudamericana for the second consecutive time, qualifying with third place in the 2012 Apertura which saw the return of Puch and Bogado, signings including Rodrigo Díaz and the emergence of Álvaro Ramos as a strong player. However, once again the team were eliminated at the preliminary stage, this time by Uruguay's Nacional after a 4–2 aggregate loss. That season, the club qualified for the Copa Libertadores after finishing third in the league. After beating Mexican side León in the first stage, Iquique finished bottom of their group in the next stage.

In 2014, Iquique won its third Copa Chile, qualifying again for the Copa Sudamericana. For the third time, it was eliminated at the preliminary stage, with a loss to Universitario de Sucre from Bolivia. In the 2014–15 season, Católica lost the title to Cobresal on the final matchday after drawing 3–3 with Iquique, after Iquique had been losing 3–0 at half time. During the 2015–16 season they finished tenth in the annual table.

== Stadium ==
The Estadio Tierra de Campeones is currently the home stadium of the club.

Before, Iquique played at the Estadio Cavancha, which holds 3,300 spectators and was built in 1933. It has been home to Deportes Iquique since the club's founding, in 1978, until 1993, and from 2016 until at least 2019.

== Players ==
=== Current squad ===
Current squad of Deportes Iquique as of 6 August 2026 (edit)
Sources: ANFP Official Web Site

No.		Position	Player
2	CHI	DF	Damir Ponce
3	CHI	DF	Joaquín Palma
5	CHI	DF	Vicente Concha
6	PAR	DF	Mario López
7	CHI	MF	Thomas Jones
8	ARG	MF	Agustín Venezia (loan from Talleres)
9	CHI	MF	Agustín Olguín
11	CHI	FW	Álvaro Ramos (c)
12	CHI	GK	Daniel Castillo
14	CHI	DF	Dilan Rojas
15	URU	DF	Nicolás Ayala
16	CHI	MF	Simón Contreras
17	CHI	MF	César González
18	CHI	MF	Brayan Garrido
19	CHI	MF	Dylan Arias
20	CHI	MF	Diego Orellana

No.		Position	Player
21	CHI	DF	Felipe Espinoza
22	CHI	GK	Henry Binimelis
23	URU	MF	Joaquín Pereyra
24	CHI	FW	Bayron Barrera
25	CHI	GK	Zacarías López
26	ARG	DF	Franco Ledesma
27	CHI	FW	Antony Henríquez
28	CHI	MF	Leonardo Troncoso
29	CHI	FW	Tomás Escobar
30	CHI	DF	Matías Blázquez
31	CHI	FW	Isaac Díaz
32	CHI	GK	Martín González
33	COL	MF	David Tello
35	CHI	FW	Víctor Saavedra
36	CHI	FW	Felipe Vera
–	ARG	FW	Pablo Palacio (loan from Unión Santa Fe)

Manager: Hernán Peña

- The teams of the Chilean Primera Division are limited to five players without Chilean nationality and also the same number of foreign players in the field.

=== 2021 Winter transfers ===
==== In ====
Note: Flags indicate national team as defined under FIFA eligibility rules; some limited exceptions apply. Players may hold more than one non-FIFA nationality.

No.	Pos.	Nation	Player
--	GK	ARG	Leandro Requena (from Cobresal)
--	DF	CHI	Juan Pablo Gómez (from Universidad de Chile)
--	DF	CHI	Marcelo Jorquera (from Cobresal)
--	MF	CHI	Bryan Soto (Loan from Colo-Colo)

No.	Pos.	Nation	Player
--	MF	CHI	César Fuentes (from Colo-Colo)
--	MF	CHI	Misael Dávila (from Palestino)
--	FW	CHI	Javier Parraguez (from Cobreloa)

==== Out ====
Note: Flags indicate national team as defined under FIFA eligibility rules; some limited exceptions apply. Players may hold more than one non-FIFA nationality.

No.	Pos.	Nation	Player
5	MF	URU	Agustín Nadruz (to Unión Española)
7	MF	CHI	Joaquín Moya (to Everton)
9	FW	ARG	Lázaro Romero (to Ferro Carril Oeste)

No.	Pos.	Nation	Player
13	GK	ARG	Daniel Sappa (Released)
19	DF	CHI	Ronald de la Fuente (Released)
22	MF	CHI	Bryan Carvallo (back to Unión Española)

== Managers ==
Interim coaches appear in italics.

- (Chile) Cornelio Vilches (1978)
- (Chile) José María Novo (1979)
- (Chile) Ramón Estay (1979–1980)
- (Chile) José María Novo (1981)
- (Chile) Andrés Prieto (1981)
- (Chile) Manuel Rodríguez Vega (1982)
- (Chile) Manuel Arrué (1982)
- (Chile) Jorge Toro (1982–1983)
- (Chile) Carlos Ahumada (1984)
- (Chile) Aurelio Valenzuela (1985)
- (Chile) Fernando Rodríguez (1985)
- (Chile) Jaime Campos (1986)
- (Chile) Ramón Estay (1987–1988)
- (Argentina) Armando Mareque (1989)
- (Chile) Óscar Valenzuela (1989–1990)
- (Chile) Ramón Estay (1990)
- (Chile) Jaime Carreño (1991)
- (Chile) Ramón Estay (1992)
- (Chile) Jaime Carreño + Pedro Cejas (1992)
- (Chile) Pedro Cejas (1993)
- (Chile) Mario Maldonado (1993)
- (Chile) Jaime Carreño (1994)
- (Chile) Guillermo Páez (1994)
- (Chile) Ramón Estay (1994)
- (Chile) Hugo Solís (1995)
- (Chile) Juan Páez (1995)
- (Chile) Joaquín Zaror (1996)
- (Uruguay) Gerardo Pelusso (1996–1997)
- (Chile) Manuel Rodríguez Araneda (1997–1998)
- (Chile) Jorge Garcés (1998–1999)
- (Chile) Miguel Ángel Arrué (1999)
- (Chile) Jaime Carreño (2000–2001)
- (Chile) Ramón Estay (2001)
- (Argentina) Víctor Milanese Comisso (2002)
- (Chile) Hernán Godoy (2002)
- (Chile) Erick Guerrero (2002)
- (Chile) Ramón Estay (2003)
- (Chile) Carlos Ahumada (2003–2005)
- (Chile) Rubén Pozo (2005)
- (Chile) Jaime Carreño (2006–2007)
- (Chile) José Sulantay (2008)
- (Chile) Horacio Rivas (2008–2009)
- (Chile) Erick Guerrero + Pedro Cejas (2009)
- (Chile) Erick Guerrero (2009)
- (Chile) Gustavo Huerta (2009–2010)
- (Chile) José Cantillana (2010–2011)
- (Chile) Víctor Sarabia (2011)
- (Chile) Jorge Pellicer (2011)
- (Chile) Fernando Vergara (2011–2012)
- (Chile) Diego Musiano (2012)
- (Argentina) Cristian Díaz (2013)
- (Chile) Diego Musiano (2013)
- (Chile) Jaime Vera (2013–2014)
- (Chile) Jaime Carreño (2014)
- (Chile) Héctor Pinto (2014)
- (Chile) Erick Guerrero (2014)
- (Uruguay) (Chile) Nelson Acosta (2014–2015)
- (Chile) Erick Guerrero (2015)
- (Chile) Jaime Vera (2015–2017)
- (Chile) Erick Guerrero (2017–2018)
- (Chile) Miguel Riffo (2018)
- (Chile) Luis Musrri (2018)
- (Argentina) Pablo Sánchez (2019)
- (Chile) Jaime Vera (2019–2020)
- (Chile) Cristian Leiva (2020–2021)
- (Chile) Luis Musrri (2021)
- (Chile) Víctor Rivero (2022)
- (Chile) Patrick Rojas (2022)
- (Chile) José Cantillana (2022)
- (Chile) Manuel Villalobos (2022)
- (Chile) Miguel Ponce (2023)
- (Chile) Miguel Ramírez (2024–2025)
- (Chile) Rodrigo Guerrero (2025–2026)
- (Chile) José Cantillana (2026)
- (Chile) Hernán Peña (2026–)

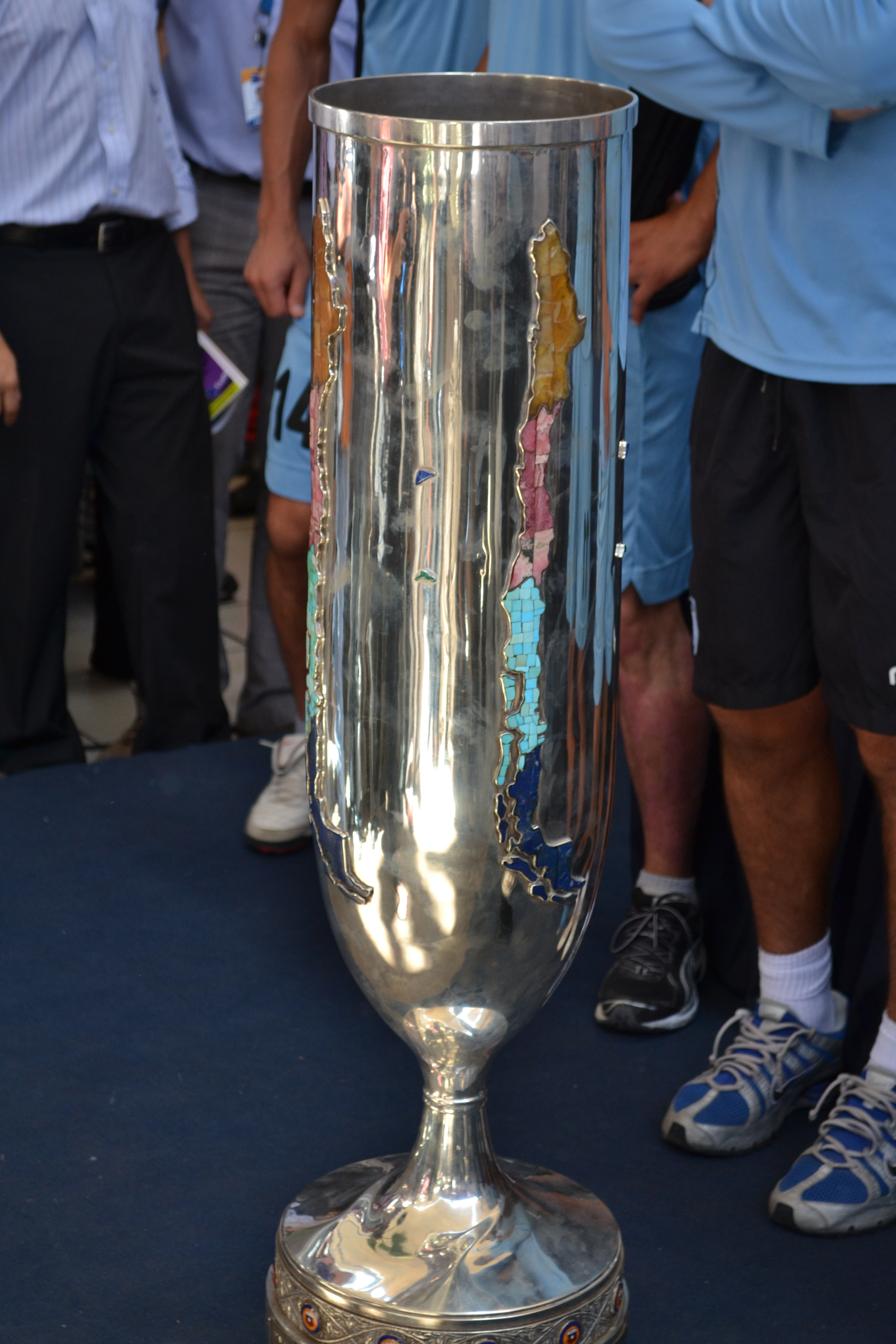
2010 Copa Chile obtained by Iquique

== Honours ==
=== Domestic ===
- Copa Chile: 3
  - 1980, 2010, 2013–14
- Segunda División/Primera B: 3
  - 1979, 1997-C, 2010
- Tercera División: 1
  - 2006

== South American cups history ==
Season	Competition	Round	Country	Club	Home	Away	Aggregate
2011	Copa Sudamericana	Second Round	(Chile)	Universidad Católica	0–0	1–2	1–2
2012	Copa Sudamericana	First Round	(Uruguay)	Nacional	2–0	0–4	2–4
2013	Copa Libertadores	First Round	(Mexico)	León	1–1	1–1	2–2 4-2p
2013	Copa Libertadores	Group Stage; Group 4	(Uruguay)	Peñarol	1–2	0–3	4th Place
2013	Copa Libertadores	Group Stage; Group 4	(Argentina)	Vélez Sarsfield	1–3	0–3	4th Place
2013	Copa Libertadores	Group Stage; Group 4	(Ecuador)	Emelec	2–0	1–2	4th Place
2014	Copa Sudamericana	First Round	(Bolivia)	Universitario de Sucre	1–0	0–2	1–2
2017	Copa Libertadores	Group Stage; Group 8	(Paraguay)	Guaraní	0–1	0–0	3rd Place
2017	Copa Libertadores	Group Stage; Group 8	(Brazil)	Gremio	2–1	2–3	3rd Place
2017	Copa Libertadores	Group Stage; Group 8	(Venezuela)	Zamora	4–3	4–1	3rd Place
2017	Copa Sudamericana	Second Round	(Argentina)	Independiente	1–2	2–4	3–6
2025	Copa Libertadores	Second Round	(Colombia)	Santa Fe	2–1	1–2	3–3 2-1p
2025	Copa Libertadores	Third Round	(Peru)	Alianza Lima	1–2	–	–
