= 1980 Copa Polla Gol =

Tournament details
- Country: Chile

Final positions
- Champions: Deportes Iquique
- Runners-up: Colo-Colo

Tournament statistics
- Top goal scorers: 9 goals: Miguel Neira (O'Higgins); Fidel Dávila (D. Iquique)

The 1980 Copa Polla Gol was the tenth edition of the Chilean Cup tournament. The competition started on February 13, 1980, and concluded on April 13, 1980. Only first level teams took part in the tournament. Deportes Iquique won the competition for their first time, beating Colo-Colo 2–1 in the final. The points system in the first round awarded 2 points for a win, increased to 3 points if the team scored 4 or more goals. In the event of a tie, each team was awarded 1 point, but no points were awarded if the score was 0–0.

== Calendar ==
Round	Date
Group Round	16 February 1980; 23 March 1980
Quarterfinals	26 March 1980; 3 April 1980
Semi-finals	4–6 April 1980
Final	13 April 1980

== Group Round ==
Key to colours in group tables
Teams that progressed to the quarterfinals

=== Group 1 ===
	DIQU	CLOA	COQU	AVIA
D. Iquique		1–1	1–0	2–2
Cobreloa	5–1		2–1	4–2
Coquimbo U.	2–1	1–0		3–3
Aviación	2–3	0–1	2–1	

Rank	Team	Points
1	Cobreloa	11
2	Deportes Iquique	6
3	Coquimbo Unido	5
4	Aviación	4

=== Group 2 ===
	NAVA	DCON	LOTA	GCRT
Naval		5–0	0–1	2–0
D. Concepción	4–1		2–1	3–1
Lota S.	0–1	0–1		1–1
Green Cross T.	1–2	2–3	2–1	

Rank	Team	Points
1	Deportes Concepción	11
2	Naval	9
3	Lota Schwager	3 (-3)
4	Green Cross Temuco	3 (-5)

=== Group 3 ===
	EVER	SWAN	AUDA	MAGA	OHIG
Everton		3–2	1–1	4–3	1–1
S. Wanderers	5–1		1–1	1–1	0–3
Audax I.	2–3	2–1		0–2	1–4
Magallanes	4–1	2–1	1–0		1–0
O'Higgins	4–1	2–2	0–0	4–2	

Rank	Team	Points
1	O'Higgins	13
2	Magallanes	12
3	Everton	9
4	Santiago Wanderers	6
5	Audax Italiano	4

=== Group 4 ===
	UESP	UCAT	PALE	COLO	UCHI
U. Española		1–0	3–2	2–2	0–0
U. Católica	0–0		2–0	2–1	3–4
Palestino	3–1	3–4		2–3	2–2
Colo-Colo	4–1	1–1	4–1		0–0
U. de Chile	1–0	3–0	1–3	1–2	

Rank	Team	Points
1	Colo-Colo	12
2	Universidad de Chile	8 (+2)
3	Universidad Católica	8 (-1)
4	Palestino	5
5	Unión Española	5

== Quarterfinals ==
Team 1	Agg.	Team 2	1st leg	2nd leg
Magallanes	0–3	Cobreloa	0–1	0–2
Naval	1–3	Universidad de Chile	0–1	1–2
Deportes Concepción	1–5	Colo-Colo	1–1	0–4
O'Higgins	3–6	Deportes Iquique	1–3	2–3

== Semifinals ==
April 4, 1980

Colo-Colo	1 – 0	Cobreloa
Caszely 88'

Estadio Nacional, Santiago
Attendance: 27,067
Referee: G. Budge

April 6, 1980

Universidad de Chile	0 – 1	Deportes Iquique
		52' Dávila

Estadio Nacional, Santiago
Attendance: 21,637
Referee: A. Martínez

== Final ==
April 13, 1980

Colo-Colo	1 – 2	Deportes Iquique
Ponce 77'		28' Dávila; 54' Souvageot

Estadio Nacional, Santiago
Attendance: 30,868
Referee: M. Lira

== Top goalscorers ==
- Miguel Neira (O'Higgins) 9 goals,
- Fidel Dávila (D. Iquique) 9 goals

== See also ==
- 1980 Campeonato Nacional
