= María Elena nitrate works =

National monument of Chile

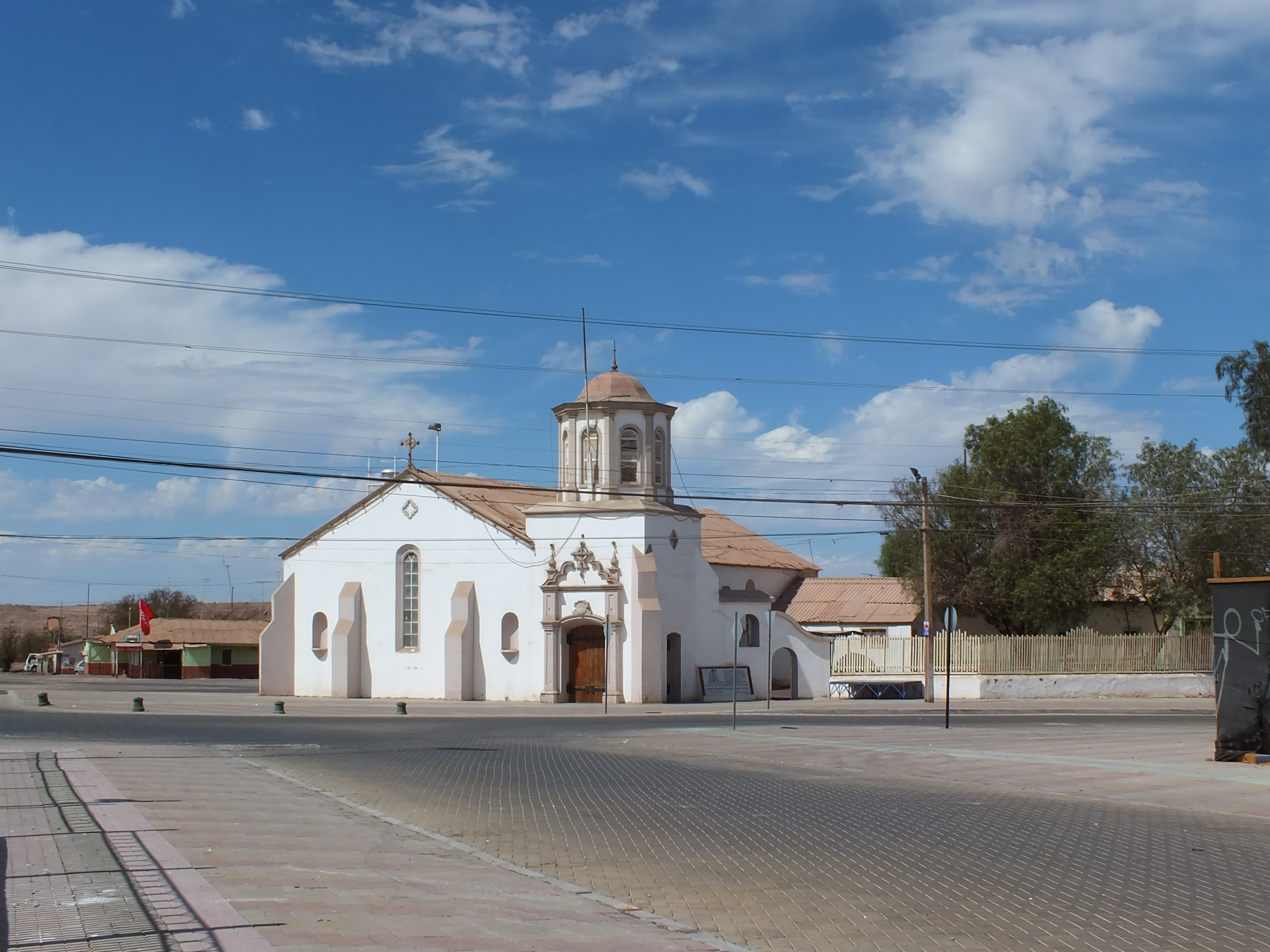
María Elena saltpetre works.

The María Elena nitrate plant is the last nitrate works still in operation in the world. It was initially named Coya Norte, but was renamed María Elena (after his wife Mary Ellen Condon) by its founder Elias Anton Cappelen Smith. It is located in the commune of the same name, in Chile, 220 km northeast of Antofagasta. As the population grew from 6700 in 2017 to over 7,000 in 2020 most of whom are workers living near the plant.

It was declared in 1999 as a Protected Zone by the Council of National Monuments.

== History ==
In 1926, the US based Anglo-Chilean Consolidated Nitrate Corporation was formed to buy out the assets of the British Anglo-Chilian Nitrate and Railway Company, with a view to expanding the expanding operation significantly, replacing the existing Humberstone process with the Guggenheim process. The layout of the town evokes the lines of the Union Jack, with four longer sides and four shorter sides.

== Zona patrimonial ==
In 1999 the status of Historical Monument was granted to the civic neighbourhood: Former Consolidated School, Grocery Store, Market, Metro Theater, San Rafael Archangel Church, Union No. 3, Former Public Baths, State Bank, Social and Sports Association.

The earthquake of 14 November 2007 damaged the church, the theatre, the school and the grocer's shop, raising fears of a possible demolition. In January 2009, SQM and the Antofagasta Regional Government signed a Protocol of Agreement to repair what was damaged by the earthquake, in which SQM undertook to repair 1,000 homes and rebuild another 50

A decree formalized in March 2009 in Antofagasta will allow future projects to preserve the harmony of the local area, which is the private property of SQM. According to the National Monuments Law, the declaration of a Zona Típica requires the preservation of houses, neighborhoods, streets and heritage sectors.

== Bibliography ==
- ARAYA PEÑA, Angel (et al.). (1982). Muestra cartográfica y glosario del léxico del salitre: II Región-Chile. Proyecto ALENOCH. Antofagasta: Univ. del Norte.
- ARDILES, Héctor (et al.). (2007). Historia de la explotación salitrera en la segunda región de Antofagasta. Antofagasta: Norte Diseño - U. Del Mar.
- BERMÚDEZ, OSCAR. (1987). Breve historia del salitre: síntesis histórica desde sus orígenes hasta mediados del siglo XX. Santiago: Eds. Pampa Desnuda.
- GONZÁLEZ PIZARRO, José Antonio (2003). La Pampa Salitrera en Antofagasta. Auge y Ocaso de una Era Histórica. La vida cotidiana durante los ciclos Shankss y Guggenheim en el desierto de atacama. Ediciones Proa, Corporación Pro Antofagasta. Antofagasta Chile.
