= GE 289A Boxcab =

Electric boxcab locomotive type

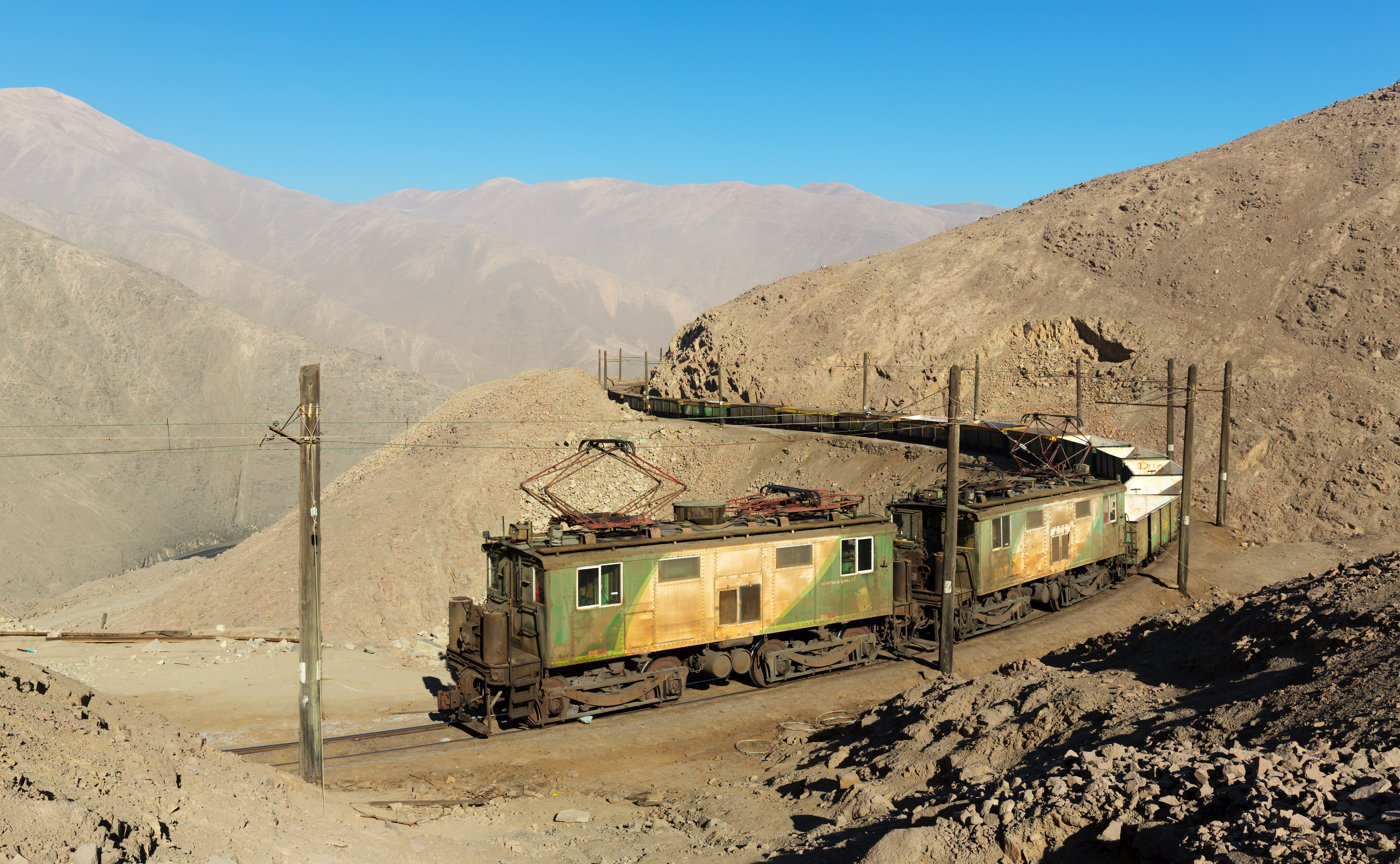
Returning empty nitrate hoppers from Tocopilla to Barriles, Chile

The General Electric (GE) 289A Boxcabs were a series of electric locomotives built by General Electric during the 1920s which operated in Chile on the Sociedad Química y Minera until the railroad was closed down in 2015 following severe weather damage.

They ran on 3 ft 6 in (1,067 mm) gauge track and were powered through overhead wires running at 1.5 kV DC power.

Locomotives of this type are still in use in the 21st Century. and as of 2009, the railroad still operated seven locomotives of this type.

The builder’s plate attached to the locomotives in Chile gives the following technical details on the units: Class B-B -134/134-E-4GE289A, operating on 1500 V DC power, built at the GE plant in Schenectady, New York, USA.

== Gallery ==
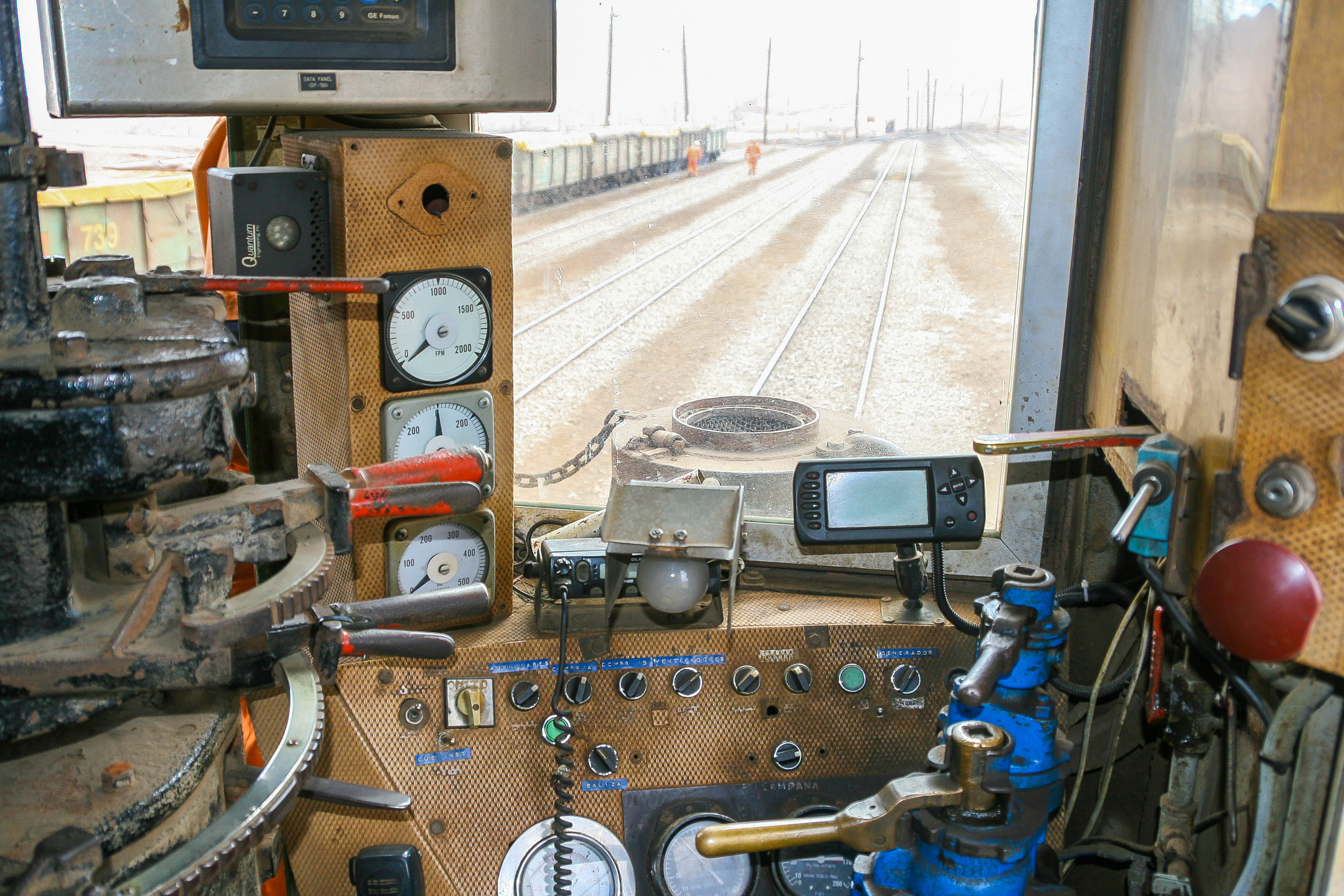
Driver's cab of SQM GE 289A No. 207

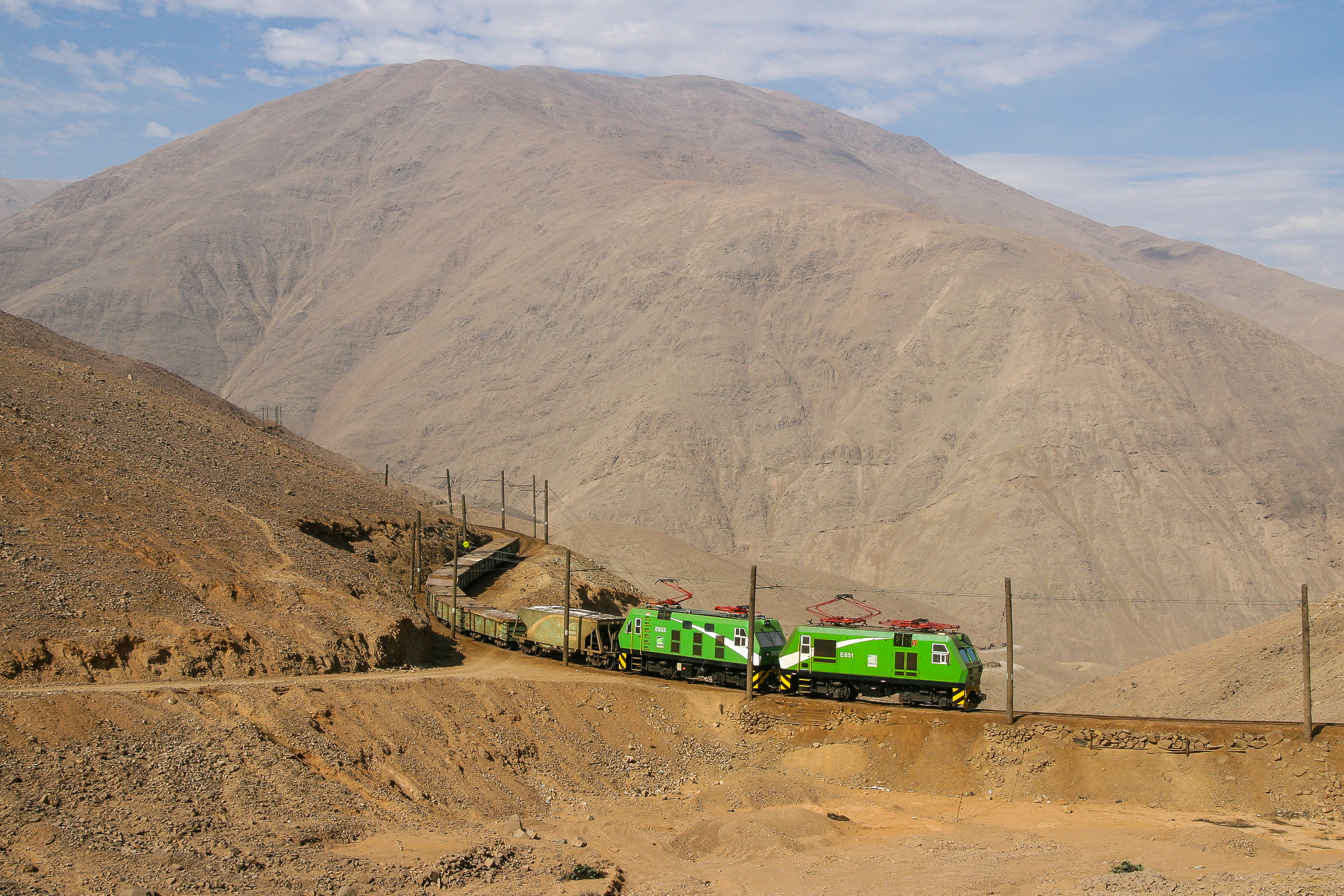
The locomotives intended to replace the GE Boxcab on the SQM

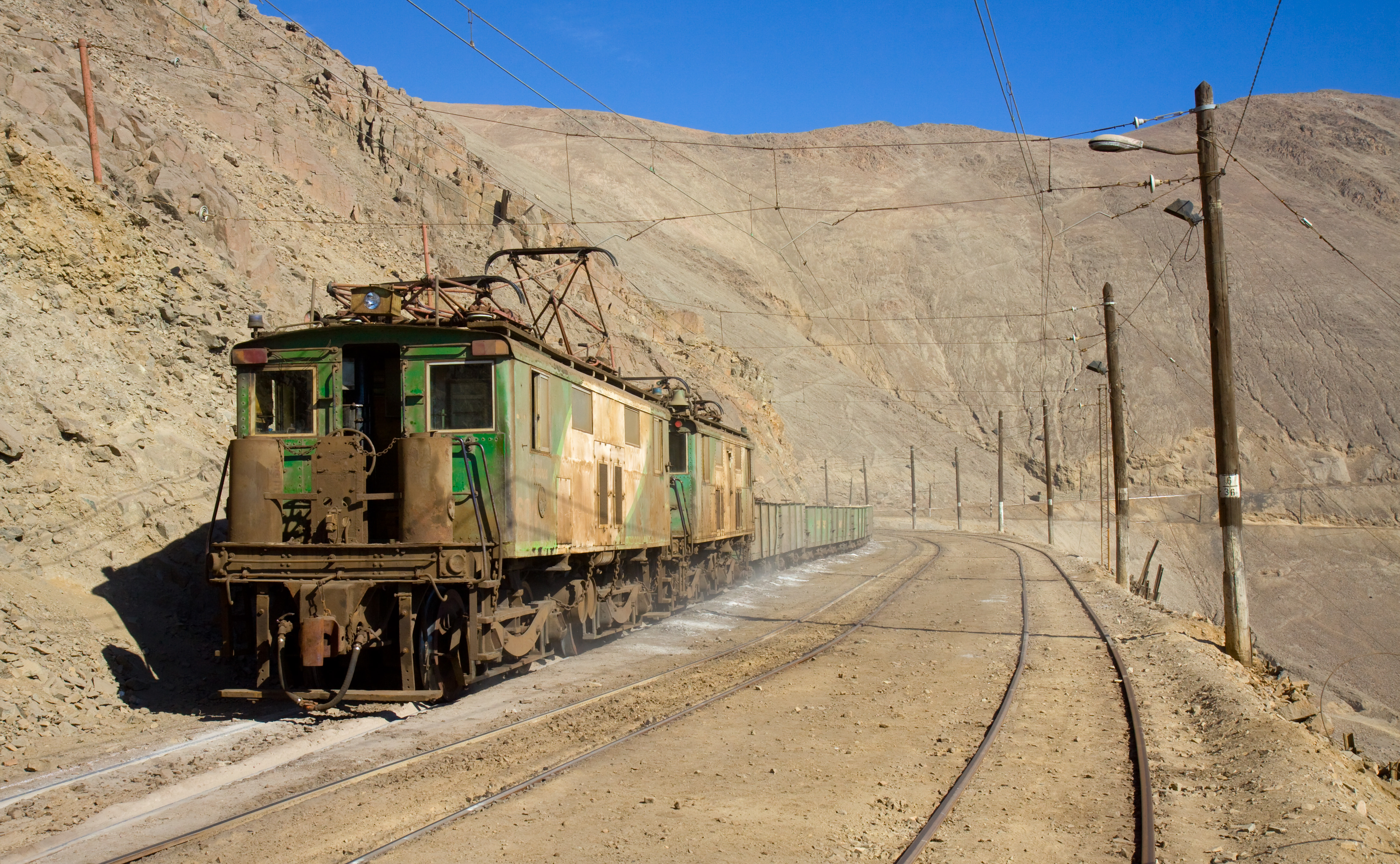
The GE 289A's shown in Chile.
