= Rodrigo Guerrero (football manager) =

Chilean football manager

Personal information
- Full name: Rodrigo Gabriel Guerrero Gutiérrez
- Date of birth: 1 November 1986 (age 39)
- Place of birth: Santiago, Chile

Managerial career
- Years: Team
- 2007–2012: Chile (video analyst)
- 2016: LDU Quito (assistant)
- 2016: LDU Quito (interim)
- 2017: Deportes Iquique (video analyst)
- 2018: Deportes Iquique (assistant)
- 2020: Alianza Lima (assistant)
- 2021–2022: Huachipato (assistant)
- 2023: Magallanes (assistant)
- 2024–2025: Deportes Iquique (match analyst)
- 2025: Deportes Iquique (interim)
- 2025: Deportes Iquique (interim)
- 2026: Deportes Iquique

Rodrigo Gabriel Guerrero Gutiérrez (born 1 November 1986) is a Chilean football manager.

== Career ==
Guerrero started his career as a video analyst for the Chile national team.

During 2016, Guerrero served as assistant coach for Ecuadorian giant LDU Quito and served as interim coach for three matches in March and April.

Back in Chile, Guerrero became a video analyst and assistant coach for Deportes Iquique.

In 2020, Guerrero joined the technical staff of Peruvian giant Alianza Lima before moving to Huachipato and Magallanes.

In 2024, Guerrero returned to Deportes Iquique as a match analyst, serving as interim coach twice in April and October 2025. Once Deportes Iquique was relegated to the Liga de Ascenso, he was appointed as the official head coach. He was released in April of the same year.
