= 2004 Campeonato Nacional Primera División =

The 2004 Primera División de Chile season was both 75th and 76th season of top-flight football in Chile.

== Torneo Apertura ==
Torneo Apertura
- Season: 2004
- Champions: Universidad de Chile; 12th title
- 2004 Copa Sudamericana: Cobreloa
- Matches: 181
- Goals: 606 (3.35 per match)
- Top goalscorer: Patricio Galaz (23 goals)
- Biggest home win: Universidad de Chile 6–1 Puerto Montt (28 February); Cobreloa 6–1 Palestino (11 April)
- Biggest away win: Deportes Temuco 0–5 Universidad de Conceción (7 February)
- Highest attendance: 55,000; Universidad de Chile 4–0 Colo-Colo (8 February)

The 2004 Torneo Apertura was the season’s first tournament which Universidad de Chile won its twelfth league title after beating Cobreloa in the final 4–2 on penalties with goalkeeper Johnny Herrera scoring the winning goal.

=== Qualification stage ===
==== Group standings ====
Group A
Pos	Team	Pld	W	D	L	GF	GA	GD	Pts	Qualification
1	Colo-Colo	17	10	3	4	29	25	+4	33	Qualify to the playoffs
2	Audax Italiano	17	5	6	6	31	28	+3	21	Qualify to the playoffs
3	Unión San Felipe	17	4	5	8	15	27	−12	17	Qualify to the repechaje
4	Cobresal	17	1	3	13	19	40	−21	6	

Group B
Pos	Team	Pld	W	D	L	GF	GA	GD	Pts	Qualification
1	Universidad de Concepción	17	9	5	3	37	17	+20	32	Qualify to the playoffs
2	Deportes Temuco	17	7	3	7	24	34	−10	24	Qualify to the playoffs
3	Rangers	17	5	3	9	21	33	−12	18	Qualify to the repechaje
4	Deportes La Serena	17	5	3	9	32	46	−14	18	
5	Palestino	17	4	2	11	34	42	−8	14	

Group C
Pos	Team	Pld	W	D	L	GF	GA	GD	Pts	Qualification
1	Cobreloa	17	11	4	2	39	19	+20	37	Qualify to the playoffs
2	Coquimbo Unido	17	9	2	6	39	37	+2	29	Qualify to the playoffs
3	Unión Española	17	7	5	5	35	32	+3	26	Qualify to the playoffs
4	Everton	17	6	3	8	22	25	−3	21	Qualify to the repechaje
5	Universidad Católica	17	6	1	10	29	19	+10	19	

Group D
Pos	Team	Pld	W	D	L	GF	GA	GD	Pts	Qualification
1	Santiago Wanderers	17	11	3	3	37	15	+22	36	Qualify to the playoffs
2	Universidad de Chile	17	9	3	5	32	21	+11	30	Qualify to the playoffs
3	Huachipato	17	8	3	6	35	31	+4	27	Qualify to the playoffs
4	Deportes Puerto Montt	17	5	5	7	27	36	−9	20	Qualify to the repechaje

=== Aggregate table ===
Pos	Team	Pld	W	D	L	GF	GA	GD	Pts	Qualification
1	Cobreloa	17	11	4	2	39	19	+20	37	Playoffs
2	Santiago Wanderers	17	11	3	3	37	15	+22	36	Playoffs
3	Colo-Colo	17	10	3	4	29	25	+4	33	Playoffs
4	Universidad de Concepción	17	9	5	3	37	17	+20	32	Playoffs
5	Universidad de Chile	17	9	3	5	32	21	+11	30	Playoffs
6	Coquimbo Unido	17	9	2	6	39	37	+2	29	Playoffs
7	Huachipato	17	8	3	6	35	31	+4	27	Playoffs
8	Unión Española	17	7	5	5	35	32	+3	26	Playoffs
9	Deportes Temuco	17	7	3	7	24	34	−10	24	Playoffs
10	Audax Italiano	17	5	6	6	31	28	+3	21	Playoffs
11	Everton	17	6	3	8	22	25	−3	21	Repechaje
12	Deportes Puerto Montt	17	5	5	7	27	36	−9	20	Repechaje
13	Universidad Católica	17	6	1	10	29	19	+10	19	
14	Rangers	17	5	3	9	21	33	−12	18	Repechaje
15	Deportes La Serena	17	5	3	9	32	46	−14	18	
16	Unión San Felipe	17	4	5	8	15	27	−12	17	Repechaje
17	Palestino	17	4	2	11	34	42	−8	14	
18	Cobresal	17	1	3	13	19	40	−21	6	

Repechaje

Match	Home	Visitor	Result
1	Rangers	Deportes Puerto Montt	3–1
2	Unión San Felipe	Everton	2–1

=== Playoffs ===
==== First round ====
Deportes Temuco and Universidad de Chile qualified as best losers.

Match	Home	Visitor	1st Leg	2nd Leg	Aggregate
1	Unión San Felipe	Cobreloa	0–2	1–2	1–4
2	Rangers	Santiago Wanderers	1–1	0–3	1–4
3	Unión Española	Universidad de Chile	3–1	1–1	4–2
4	Huachipato	Coquimbo Unido	3–2	3–0	6–2
5	Deportes Temuco	Universidad de Concepción	0–1	1–1	1–2
6	Audax Italiano	Colo-Colo	0–1	0–1	0–2

==== Knockout stage ====
Quarterfinals
1	Cobreloa	1	3	4
10	Deportes Temuco	1	1	2
3	Colo-Colo	1	0	1
7	Huachipato	1	1	2
2	Santiago Wanderers	1	2	3
8	Unión Española	2	0	2
4	Universidad de Concepción	0	2	2
5	Universidad de Chile (a.e.t.)	1	1	2

Semifinals
1	Cobreloa	2	3	5
7	Huachipato	2	2	4
2	Santiago Wanderers	1	0	1
5	Universidad de Chile	1	2	3

Finals
1	Cobreloa	0	1	1 (2)
5	Universidad de Chile (p)	0	1	1 (4)

==== Finals ====
23 June 2004
1st Leg

Universidad de Chile	0–0	Cobreloa
	Report

Estadio Nacional, Santiago
Attendance: 30,515
Referee: Rubén Selman

27 June 2004
2nd Leg

Cobreloa	1–1 (a.e.t.)	Universidad de Chile
Fuentes 35'	Report	González 52' (o.g.)
Penalties
Cornejo (penalty missed); Fuentes (penalty missed); Fernández (penalty scored); Galaz (penalty scored)	2–4	(penalty missed) Muñoz; (penalty scored) Pinto; (penalty scored) Tampe; (penalty scored) Gioino; (penalty scored) Herrera

Estadio Municipal de Calama, Calama
Attendance: 13,000
Referee: Carlos Chandía

2004 Apertura winners
Universidad de Chile
12th title

=== Top goalscorers ===
Rank	Player	Club	Goals
1	(Chile) Patricio Galaz	Cobreloa	23
2	(Chile) Jaime Riveros	Santiago Wanderers	22
3	(Chile) Felipe Flores Quijada	Deportes La Serena	17
4	(Chile) Héctor Mancilla	Huachipato	16
5	(Chile) Marcelo Corrales	Coquimbo Unido	14
5	(Chile) José Luis Sierra	Unión Española	14

== Torneo Clausura ==
Torneo Clausura
- Season: 2004
- Champions: Cobreloa; 8th title
- 2005 Copa Libertadores: Cobreloa
- Matches: 180
- Goals: 557 (3.09 per match)
- Top goalscorer: Patricio Galaz (19 goals)
- Biggest home win: Cobresal 6–1 La Serena; Cobreloa 6–0 Everton (17 September)
- Biggest away win: Coquimbo Unido 3–7 Colo-Colo (19 February)
- Highest attendance: 42,000; Universidad de Chile 0–1 Colo-Colo (1 August)

The 2004 Torneo Clausura was the season’s second tournament. Universidad de Chile was the defending champions.

=== Qualification stage ===
==== Group standings ====
Group A
Pos	Team	Pld	W	D	L	GF	GA	GD	Pts	Qualification
1	Audax Italiano	17	7	5	5	34	24	+10	26	Qualify to the playoffs
2	Cobreloa	17	6	7	4	37	26	+11	25	Qualify to the playoffs
3	Unión Española	17	6	5	6	24	20	+4	23	Qualify to the playoffs
4	Deportes La Serena	17	4	4	9	23	38	−15	16	

Group B
Pos	Team	Pld	W	D	L	GF	GA	GD	Pts	Qualification
1	Coquimbo Unido	17	4	6	7	21	26	−5	18	Qualify to the playoffs
2	Unión San Felipe	17	4	6	7	18	25	−7	18	Qualify to the playoffs
3	Deportes Puerto Montt	17	4	5	8	16	20	−4	17	Qualify to the repechaje
4	Santiago Wanderers	17	4	2	11	24	36	−12	14	

Group C
Pos	Team	Pld	W	D	L	GF	GA	GD	Pts	Qualification
1	Colo-Colo	17	9	5	3	28	18	+10	32	Qualify to the playoffs
2	Universidad de Chile	17	8	6	3	27	14	+13	30	Qualify to the playoffs
3	Deportes Temuco	17	4	9	4	34	36	−2	21	Qualify to the playoffs
4	Palestino	17	6	3	8	23	28	−5	21	
5	Rangers	17	3	6	8	19	33	−14	15	

Group D
Pos	Team	Pld	W	D	L	GF	GA	GD	Pts	Qualification
1	Universidad Católica	17	9	5	3	32	19	+13	32	Qualify to the playoffs
2	Cobresal	17	8	4	5	32	26	+6	28	Qualify to the playoffs
3	Universidad de Concepción	17	8	4	5	22	16	+6	28	Qualify to the playoffs
4	Everton	17	6	4	7	20	26	−6	22	Qualify to the repechaje
5	Huachipato	17	6	2	9	24	26	−2	20	

==== Aggregate table ====
Pos	Team	Pld	W	D	L	GF	GA	GD	Pts	Qualification
1	Universidad Católica	17	9	5	3	32	19	+13	32	Playoffs
2	Colo-Colo	17	9	5	3	28	18	+10	32	Playoffs
3	Universidad de Chile	17	8	6	3	27	14	+13	30	Playoffs
4	Cobresal	17	8	4	5	32	26	+6	28	Playoffs
5	Universidad de Concepción	17	8	4	5	22	16	+6	28	Playoffs
6	Audax Italiano	17	7	5	5	34	24	+10	26	Playoffs
7	Cobreloa	17	6	7	4	37	26	+11	25	Playoffs
8	Unión Española	17	6	5	6	24	20	+4	23	Playoffs
9	Everton	17	6	4	7	20	26	−6	22	Repechaje
10	Deportes Temuco	17	4	9	4	34	36	−2	21	Playoffs
11	Palestino	17	6	3	8	23	28	−5	21	
12	Huachipato	17	6	2	9	24	26	−2	20	
13	Coquimbo Unido	17	4	6	7	21	26	−5	18	Playoffs
14	Unión San Felipe	17	4	6	7	18	25	−7	18	Playoffs
15	Deportes Puerto Montt	17	4	5	8	16	20	−4	17	Repechaje
16	La Serena	17	4	4	9	23	38	−15	16	
17	Rangers	17	3	6	8	19	33	−14	15	
18	Santiago Wanderers	17	4	2	11	24	36	−12	14	

Repechaje

Match	Home	Visitor	Result
1	Deportes Puerto Montt	Everton	1–2

=== Playoffs ===
==== First round ====
Match	Home	Visitor	1st Leg	2nd Leg	Aggregate
1	Cobreloa	Audax Italiano	5–2	1–2	6–4
2	Unión Española	Universidad de Concepción	0–0	1–1	1–1 (3–1 p)
3	Everton	Cobresal	3–2	0–1	3–3 (1–3 p)
4	Coquimbo Unido	Colo-Colo	3–7	1–1	4–8
5	Unión San Felipe	Universidad Católica	2–2	0–3	2–5
6	Deportes Temuco	Universidad de Chile	2–0	0–2	2–2 (3–5 p)

==== Knockout stage ====
Quarterfinals
5	Cobresal	1	2	3
7	Cobreloa	2	2	4
2	Colo-Colo	3	3	6
9	Everton	1	4	5
3	Universidad de Chile	3	3	6 (2)
8	Unión Española (p)	4	2	6 (4)
1	Universidad Católica	1	6	7
10	Deportes Temuco	3	2	5

Semifinals
8	Cobreloa	4	1	5
2	Colo-Colo	1	1	2
8	Unión Española (p)	3	1	4 (4)
1	Universidad Católica	1	3	4 (3)

Finals
8	Unión Española	1	0	1
7	Cobreloa	3	0	3

==== Finals ====
16 December 2004
1st Leg

Unión Española	1–3	Cobreloa
Jerez 68'	Report	D. Pérez 28'; R. Pérez 52'; Miranda 80' (o.g.)

Estadio Santa Laura, Santiago
Attendance: 14,175
Referee: Rubén Selman

19 December 2004
2nd Leg

Cobreloa	0–0	Unión Española
	Report

Estadio Municipal de Calama, Calama
Attendance: 11,096
Referee: Pablo Pozo

2004 Clausura winners
Cobreloa
8th title

=== Top goalscorers ===
Rank	Player	Club	Goals
1	(Chile) Patricio Galaz	Cobreloa	19
2	(Chile) Humberto Suazo	Audax Italiano	17
3	(Chile) César Díaz	Cobresal	14
4	(Colombia) Alex Comas	Unión Española	12
4	(Argentina) Sergio Gioino	Universidad de Chile	12
6	(Chile) Marcelo Corrales	Coquimbo Unido	11
7	(Chile) Daniel Pérez	Unión Española	10
7	(Chile) Cristián Canío	Deportes Temuco	10
