= 2004 Torneo Apertura (Chile) =

Campeonato Nacional Apertura Copa Banco del Estado
- Season: 2004
- Dates: 6 February – 27 June 2004
- Champions: Universidad de Chile; 12th title
- 2005 Copa Libertadores: Universidad de Chile
- 2004 Copa Sudamericana: Santiago Wanderers (Pre-Sudamericana winners); Universidad de Concepción (Pre-Sudamericana winners)
- Matches played: 181
- Goals scored: 606 (3.35 per match)
- Top goalscorer: Patricio Galaz (23 goals)
- Biggest home win: Universidad de Chile 6–1 Puerto Montt (28 February); Cobreloa 6–1 Palestino (11 April)
- Biggest away win: Deportes Temuco 0–5 Universidad de Conceción (7 February)
- Total attendance: 784,592
- Average attendance: 4,334

The 2004 Campeonato Nacional Apertura Copa Banco del Estado was the 75th Chilean League top flight, in which Universidad de Chile won its twelfth league title after beating Cobreloa in the final, on penalties, with goalkeeper Johnny Herrera scoring the winning penalty kick.

== Qualifying stage ==
=== Results ===
| | AUD | CLO | CSA | COL | COQ | EVE | HUA | DLS | PAL | DPM | RAN | SFE | DTE | UCA | UCH | UCO | UES | SWA |
|---|---|---|---|---|---|---|---|---|---|---|---|---|---|---|---|---|---|---|
| Audax | | | 4–0 | | 5–2 | 1–1 | | 3–3 | | 2–2 | 3–1 | | | | | 0–2 | | 1–1 |
| Cobreloa | 1–1 | | | 3–0 | | | | | 6–1 | | | 3–1 | 3–0 | 2–1 | 3–0 | | 2–2 | |
| Cobresal | | 2–3 | | 0–1 | | | | | 3–3 | | | 2–2 | 0–3 | 0–1 | 0–1 | | 3–4 | |
| Colo-Colo | 2–1 | | | | 2–1 | | 2–4 | | 2–1 | | | 1–1 | | | 0–4 | 0–2 | 4–1 | 4–1 |
| Coquimbo | | 3–3 | 2–1 | | | 2–0 | 3–2 | 4–3 | | 4–0 | 4–2 | | 4–3 | 3–2 | | | | |
| Everton | | 1–3 | 1–0 | 0–2 | | | | 2–0 | | | | 0–1 | 5–0 | 2–0 | | | 0–0 | |
| Huachipato | 2–1 | 1–2 | 3–1 | | | 2–4 | | 4–2 | 3–2 | | | 0–0 | | | 2–1 | 2–2 | | |
| La Serena | | 1–2 | 4–3 | 1–1 | | | | | 3–2 | | | 3–0 | 2–2 | 1–4 | | | 2–4 | |
| Palestino | 3–5 | | | | 2–3 | 4–0 | | | | 2–0 | 0–0 | | | | 2–3 | 0–1 | | 2–4 |
| Puerto Montt | | 1–1 | 4–0 | 3–3 | | 3–2 | 2–1 | 1–2 | | | | | 0–1 | 1–1 | | | 4–1 | |
| Rangers | | 0–2 | 2–4 | 1–2 | | 1–0 | 2–2 | 1–4 | | 3–2 | | | 2–3 | 2–1 | | | | |
| San Felipe | 1–1 | | | | 2–1 | | | | 2–3 | 1–2 | 0–2 | | | | 1–0 | 1–0 | | 0–2 |
| Temuco | 2–1 | | | 0–1 | | | 1–3 | | 2–1 | | | 1–0 | | 1–0 | 3–3 | 0–5 | 2–2 | |
| U. Católica | 3–2 | | | 1–2 | | | 5–1 | | 2–1 | | | 4–0 | | | 1–2 | 3–4 | 0–4 | 0–1 |
| U. de Chile | 0–1 | | | | 1–0 | 0–0 | | 3–1 | | 6–1 | 2–0 | | | | | 3–1 | | 2–2 |
| U. Concepción | | 3–0 | 0–0 | | 5–0 | 2–4 | | 5–0 | | 1–1 | 0–0 | | | | | | | 2–1 |
| U. Española | 2–0 | | | | 2–1 | | 2–1 | | 3–5 | | 1–2 | 2–2 | | | 3–1 | 2–2 | | 0–1 |
| S. Wanderers | | 1–0 | 2–0 | | 2–2 | 4–0 | 0–2 | 5–0 | | 5–0 | 3–0 | | 2–0 | | | | | |

=== Group standings ===
==== Group A ====
| Pos | Team | Pld | W | D | L | GF | GA | GD | Pts | Qualification |
|---|---|---|---|---|---|---|---|---|---|---|
| 1 | Colo-Colo | 17 | 10 | 3 | 4 | 29 | 25 | +4 | 33 | Qualify to the playoffs |
| 2 | Audax Italiano | 17 | 5 | 6 | 6 | 31 | 28 | +3 | 21 | Qualify to the playoffs |
| 3 | Unión San Felipe | 17 | 4 | 5 | 8 | 15 | 27 | −12 | 17 | Qualify to the repechaje |
| 4 | Cobresal | 17 | 1 | 3 | 13 | 19 | 40 | −21 | 6 | |

==== Group B ====
| Pos | Team | Pld | W | D | L | GF | GA | GD | Pts | Qualification |
|---|---|---|---|---|---|---|---|---|---|---|
| 1 | Universidad de Concepción | 17 | 9 | 5 | 3 | 37 | 17 | +20 | 32 | Qualify to the playoffs |
| 2 | Deportes Temuco | 17 | 7 | 3 | 7 | 24 | 34 | −10 | 24 | Qualify to the playoffs |
| 3 | Rangers | 17 | 5 | 3 | 9 | 21 | 33 | −12 | 18 | Qualify to the repechaje |
| 4 | Deportes La Serena | 17 | 5 | 3 | 9 | 32 | 46 | −14 | 18 | |
| 5 | Palestino | 17 | 4 | 2 | 11 | 34 | 42 | −8 | 14 | |

==== Group C ====
| Pos | Team | Pld | W | D | L | GF | GA | GD | Pts | Qualification |
|---|---|---|---|---|---|---|---|---|---|---|
| 1 | Cobreloa | 17 | 11 | 4 | 2 | 39 | 19 | +20 | 37 | Qualify to the playoffs |
| 2 | Coquimbo Unido | 17 | 9 | 2 | 6 | 39 | 37 | +2 | 29 | Qualify to the playoffs |
| 3 | Unión Española | 17 | 7 | 5 | 5 | 35 | 32 | +3 | 26 | Qualify to the playoffs |
| 4 | Everton | 17 | 6 | 3 | 8 | 22 | 25 | −3 | 21 | Qualify to the repechaje |
| 5 | Universidad Católica | 17 | 6 | 1 | 10 | 29 | 19 | +10 | 19 | |

==== Group D ====
| Pos | Team | Pld | W | D | L | GF | GA | GD | Pts | Qualification |
|---|---|---|---|---|---|---|---|---|---|---|
| 1 | Santiago Wanderers | 17 | 11 | 3 | 3 | 37 | 15 | +22 | 36 | Qualify to the playoffs |
| 2 | Universidad de Chile | 17 | 9 | 3 | 5 | 32 | 21 | +11 | 30 | Qualify to the playoffs |
| 3 | Huachipato | 17 | 8 | 3 | 6 | 35 | 31 | +4 | 27 | Qualify to the playoffs |
| 4 | Deportes Puerto Montt | 17 | 5 | 5 | 7 | 27 | 36 | −9 | 20 | Qualify to the repechaje |

=== Aggregate table ===
| Pos | Team | Pld | W | D | L | GF | GA | GD | Pts | Qualification |
|---|---|---|---|---|---|---|---|---|---|---|
| 1 | Cobreloa | 17 | 11 | 4 | 2 | 39 | 19 | +20 | 37 | Playoffs |
| 2 | Santiago Wanderers | 17 | 11 | 3 | 3 | 37 | 15 | +22 | 36 | Playoffs |
| 3 | Colo-Colo | 17 | 10 | 3 | 4 | 29 | 25 | +4 | 33 | Playoffs |
| 4 | Universidad de Concepción | 17 | 9 | 5 | 3 | 37 | 17 | +20 | 32 | Playoffs |
| 5 | Universidad de Chile | 17 | 9 | 3 | 5 | 32 | 21 | +11 | 30 | Playoffs |
| 6 | Coquimbo Unido | 17 | 9 | 2 | 6 | 39 | 37 | +2 | 29 | Playoffs |
| 7 | Huachipato | 17 | 8 | 3 | 6 | 35 | 31 | +4 | 27 | Playoffs |
| 8 | Unión Española | 17 | 7 | 5 | 5 | 35 | 32 | +3 | 26 | Playoffs |
| 9 | Deportes Temuco | 17 | 7 | 3 | 7 | 24 | 34 | −10 | 24 | Playoffs |
| 10 | Audax Italiano | 17 | 5 | 6 | 6 | 31 | 28 | +3 | 21 | Playoffs |
| 11 | Everton | 17 | 6 | 3 | 8 | 22 | 25 | −3 | 21 | Repechaje |
| 12 | Deportes Puerto Montt | 17 | 5 | 5 | 7 | 27 | 36 | −9 | 20 | Repechaje |
| 13 | Universidad Católica | 17 | 6 | 1 | 10 | 29 | 19 | +10 | 19 | |
| 14 | Rangers | 17 | 5 | 3 | 9 | 21 | 33 | −12 | 18 | Repechaje |
| 15 | Deportes La Serena | 17 | 5 | 3 | 9 | 32 | 46 | −14 | 18 | |
| 16 | Unión San Felipe | 17 | 4 | 5 | 8 | 15 | 27 | −12 | 17 | Repechaje |
| 17 | Palestino | 17 | 4 | 2 | 11 | 34 | 42 | −8 | 14 | |
| 18 | Cobresal | 17 | 1 | 3 | 13 | 19 | 40 | −21 | 6 | |

==== Repechaje ====
| Match | Home | Visitor | Result |
|---|---|---|---|
| 1 | Rangers | Deportes Puerto Montt | 3–1 |
| 2 | Unión San Felipe | Everton | 2–1 |

== Playoffs ==
=== First round ===
Deportes Temuco and Universidad de Chile qualified as best losers.

| Match | Home | Visitor | 1st Leg | 2nd Leg | Aggregate |
|---|---|---|---|---|---|
| 1 | Unión San Felipe | Cobreloa | 0–2 | 1–2 | 1–4 |
| 2 | Rangers | Santiago Wanderers | 1–1 | 0–3 | 1–4 |
| 3 | Unión Española | Universidad de Chile | 3–1 | 1–1 | 4–2 |
| 4 | Huachipato | Coquimbo Unido | 3–2 | 3–0 | 6–2 |
| 5 | Deportes Temuco | Universidad de Concepción | 0–1 | 1–1 | 1–2 |
| 6 | Audax Italiano | Colo-Colo | 0–1 | 0–1 | 0–2 |

=== Knockout stage ===
Quarterfinals
1 | Cobreloa | 1 | 3 | 4
10 | Deportes Temuco | 1 | 1 | 2
3 | Colo-Colo | 1 | 0 | 1
7 | Huachipato | 1 | 1 | 2
2 | Santiago Wanderers | 1 | 2 | 3
8 | Unión Española | 2 | 0 | 2
4 | Universidad de Concepción | 0 | 2 | 2
5 | Universidad de Chile (a.e.t.) | 1 | 1 | 2

Semifinals
1 | Cobreloa | 2 | 3 | 5
7 | Huachipato | 2 | 2 | 4
2 | Santiago Wanderers | 1 | 0 | 1
5 | Universidad de Chile | 1 | 2 | 3

Finals
1 | Cobreloa | 0 | 1 | 1 (2)
5 | Universidad de Chile (p) | 0 | 1 | 1 (4)

=== Finals ===
23 June 2004
1st Leg

| Universidad de Chile | 0–0 | Cobreloa |
|---|---|---|
| | Report |

Estadio Nacional, Santiago
Attendance: 30,515
Referee: Rubén Selman

27 June 2004
2nd Leg

| Cobreloa | 1–1 (a.e.t.) | Universidad de Chile |
|---|---|---|
| Fuentes 35' | Report | González 52' (o.g.) |
Penalties
| Cornejo (penalty missed); Fuentes (penalty missed); Fernández (penalty scored); Galaz (penalty scored) | 2–4 | (penalty missed) Muñoz; (penalty scored) Pinto; (penalty scored) Tampe; (penalty scored) Gioino; (penalty scored) Herrera |

Estadio Municipal de Calama, Calama
Attendance: 13,000
Referee: Carlos Chandía

2004 Apertura winners
Universidad de Chile
12th title

== Top goalscorers ==
| Rank | Player | Club | Goals |
|---|---|---|---|
| 1 | (Chile) Patricio Galaz | Cobreloa | 23 |
| 2 | (Chile) Jaime Riveros | Santiago Wanderers | 22 |
| 3 | (Chile) Felipe Flores Quijada | Deportes La Serena | 17 |
| 4 | (Chile) Héctor Mancilla | Huachipato | 16 |
| 5 | (Chile) Marcelo Corrales | Coquimbo Unido | 14 |
| 5 | (Chile) José Luis Sierra | Unión Española | 14 |

== Pre-Copa Sudamericana 2004 Tournament ==
=== Preliminary round ===
Played on June 28 & July 4, 2004

| Team 1 | Agg. | Team 2 | 1st leg | 2nd leg |
|---|---|---|---|---|
| Palestino | 3–7 | Rangers | 2–2 | 1–5 |
| Unión San Felipe | 0–5 | Santiago Wanderers | 0–3 | 0–2 |

=== First round ===
Played on July 7 & 10, 2004

| Team 1 | Agg. | Team 2 | 1st leg | 2nd leg |
|---|---|---|---|---|
| Cobresal | 4–3 | Cobreloa | 2–2 | 2–1 |
| Deportes La Serena | 3–3 * | Coquimbo Unido | 2–0 | 1–3 |
| Everton | 5–7 | Santiago Wanderers | 2–5 | 3–2 |
| Universidad Católica | 3–4 | Colo-Colo | 1–1 | 2–3 |
| Unión Española | 1–0 | Universidad de Chile | 1–0 | 0–0 |
| Rangers | 1–1 * | Audax Italiano | 0–1 | 1–0 |
| Huachipato | 2–4 | Universidad de Concepción | 0–2 | 2–2 |
| Deportes Puerto Montt | 2–3 | Deportes Temuco | 1–1 | 1–2 |

*Qualified due to its better Apertura 2004 position

=== Second round ===
Played on July 21 & 25, 2004

| Team 1 | Agg. | Team 2 | 1st leg | 2nd leg |
|---|---|---|---|---|
| Cobresal | 4–2 | Deportes La Serena | 2–1 | 2–1 |
| Colo-Colo | 2–2 * | Santiago Wanderers | 2–0 | 0–2 |
| Audax Italiano | 0–5 | Unión Española | 0–2 | 0–3 |
| Deportes Temuco | 5–5 * | Universidad de Concepción | 3–5 | 2–0 |

*Qualified due to its better Apertura 2004 position

=== Final round ===
| 28 July 2004 | Cobresal | 2 – 2 | Santiago Wanderers | Estadio El Cobre, El Salvador |
| | Cisternas 69' (pen.), 71' | | 57' De Gregorio; 70' Núñez | Attendance: 986; Referee: C. Fuenzalida |

| 28 July 2004 | Unión Española | 0 – 0 | Universidad de Concepción | Estadio Santa Laura, Santiago |
| | | | | Attendance: 1,248; Referee: E. Osses |

| 5 August 2004 | Santiago Wanderers | 3 – 1 | Cobresal | Estadio Regional Chiledeportes, Valparaíso |
| | Riveros 6', 71'; Núñez 34' | | 23' Baeza | Attendance: 2,252; Referee: C. Chandía |

| 5 August 2004 | Universidad de Concepción | 2 – 0 | Unión Española | Estadio Municipal, Concepción |
| | Fernández 50'; Figueroa 89' | | | Attendance: 3,000; Referee: R. Selman |

Santiago Wanderers & Universidad de Concepción qualified to 2004 Copa Sudamericana
