= Juan Muñoz =

Juan Muñoz may refer to:

== Arts and entertainment ==
- Juan Quintero Muñoz (1903–1980), Spanish composer
- Juan Muñoz (writer) (1929-2023), Spanish writer and teacher
- Juan Muñoz (sculptor) (1953–2001), Spanish sculptor
- Juan Muñoz (comedian) (born 1965), Spanish comedian
- Juan Jacinto Muñoz Rengel (born 1974), Spanish novelist

== Sports ==
=== Association football (soccer) ===
- Juan Muñoz (footballer, born 1912), Chilean footballer
- Juan Carlos Muñoz (1919–2009), Argentine footballer
- Juan Carlos Muñoz (Chilean footballer) (born 1978)
- Juan Muñoz (footballer, born 1985), Spanish footballer
- Juan Muñoz (footballer, born 1995), Spanish footballer

=== Other sports ===
- Juan Muñoz (boxer) (1907–1972), Spanish boxer
- Juan Francisco Muñoz (born 1959), Spanish handball player
- Oscar Múñoz (baseball) (Juan Oscar Múñoz, born 1969), Major League Baseball pitcher
- Juan Manuel Muñoz Díaz (born 1969), Spanish dressage rider

== Others ==
- Juan Muñoz Bejarano (1610-1670), Spanish military officer and politician
- Juan Muñoz Gadea (1634-?), Spanish soldier and governor
- Juan Muñoz y Peralta (1695-1746), Spanish physician
- Juan Bautista Muñoz (1745–1799), Spanish philosopher
- Juan Carlos Muñoz Márquez (born 1950), Mexican politician
- Juan José Muñoz (1950–2013), Argentine businessman

== See also ==
- Juan Carlos Muñoz (disambiguation)
