= Juan Carlos Muñoz =

Juan Carlos Muñoz may refer to:

- Juan Carlos Muñoz (footballer, born 1919), Argentine football winger and manager
- Juan Carlos Muñoz (footballer, born 1968), Chilean football winger
- Juan Carlos Muñoz (footballer, born 1978), Chilean football defender
- Juan Carlos Muñoz (politician) (born 1970), Chilean politician and engineer
- Juan Carlos Muñoz Márquez (born 1950), Mexican politician

== See also ==
- Juan Muñoz (disambiguation)
