= 2000 Copa Apertura =

Tournament details
- Country: Chile
- Teams: 16

Final positions
- Champions: Universidad de Chile
- Runners-up: Santiago Morning

Tournament statistics
- Top goal scorer: Fernando Martel (7 goals)

The 2000 Copa Apertura was the 28th edition of the Chilean Cup tournament. The competition started on February 19, 2000 and concluded on May 11, 2000. Only first level teams took part in the tournament. Universidad de Chile won the competition for their third time, beating Santiago Morning 2–1 in the final.

== Calendar ==
Round	Date
Group Round	11 February 2000; 2 April 2000
Semi-finals	3-4 May 2000
Finals	11-16 May 2000

== Group Round ==
Key to colours in group tables
Teams that progressed to the Semifinals

=== Group 1 ===
	UCHI	UESP	OHIG	DCON
U. de Chile		3–1	4–0	0–0
U. Española	2–2		5–2	6–1
O'Higgins	0–4	2–3		0–0
D. Concepción	0–2	2–2	1–0	

Rank	Team	Points
1	Universidad de Chile	14
2	Unión Española	11
3	Deportes Concepción	6
4	O'Higgins	1

=== Group 2 ===
	AUDI	SWAN	SMOR	UCAT
Audax I.		2–0	2–2	2–3
S. Wanderers	0–3		0–1	0–0
S. Morning	2–1	1–0		3–0
U. Católica	1–1	2–0	1–0	

Rank	Team	Points
1	Santiago Morning	13
2	Universidad Católica	11
3	Audax Italiano	8
4	Santiago Wanderers	1

=== Group 3 ===
	COLO	DPMO	POSO	HUAC
Colo-Colo		5–2	4–0	2–1
D. Puerto Montt	1–2		1–0	1–1
P. Osorno	1–3	6–1		2–0
Huachipato	0–0	5–0	5–3	

Rank	Team	Points
1	Colo-Colo	16
2	Huachipato	8
3	Provincial Osorno	6
4	Deportes Puerto Montt	4

=== Group 4 ===
	CLOA	COQU	PALE	EVER
Cobreloa		2–0	3–0	1–2
Coquimbo U.	0–1		1–0	0–1
Palestino	2–2	1–0		2–1
Everton	0–2	1–2	1–0	

Rank	Team	Points
1	Cobreloa	13
2	Everton	9
3	Palestino	7
4	Coquimbo Unido	6

== Semifinals ==
May 3, 2000

Universidad de Chile	3 – 1	Colo-Colo
Flores 29' (o.g.); P. González 79'; Barrera 88'		37' Sierra

Estadio Nacional, Santiago
Attendance: 15,000
Referee: M. Sánchez

May 4, 2000

Santiago Morning	4 – 0	Cobreloa
Carreño 55'; Ibarra 65'; Martel 67'; Arrué 75'

Estadio Santa Laura, Santiago
Attendance: 5,000
Referee: M. Peña

== Third-place match ==
May 16, 2000

Colo-Colo	0 – 0 (a.e.t.)	Cobreloa
Penalties
Guajardo (penalty missed); Sarabia (penalty scored); Zúñiga (penalty missed); Flores (penalty scored)	2 – 4	(penalty scored) Cornejo; (penalty scored) Donoso; (penalty scored) C. Díaz; (penalty scored) Miranda

Estadio Sausalito, Viña del Mar
Attendance: 700
Referee: C. Lemus

== Final ==
May 11, 2000

Universidad de Chile	2 – 1 (a.e.t.)	Santiago Morning
Acuña 7', 118'		54' Martel

Estadio Nacional, Santiago
Attendance: 13,529
Referee: C. Robles

Copa Chile
2000 Champion
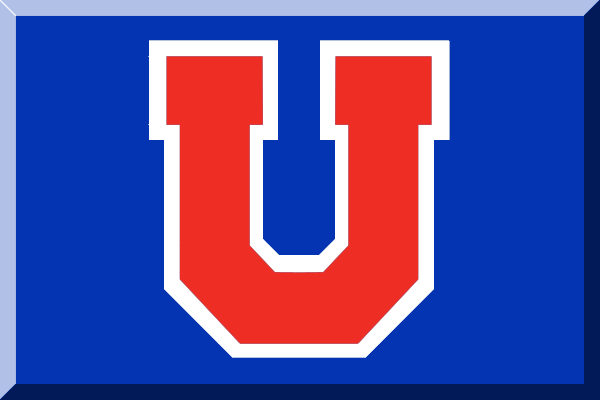
U. de Chile
Third Title

== Top goalscorer ==
- Fernando Martel (Santiago Morning) 7 goals

== See also ==
- 2000 Campeonato Nacional
