= Cisternas =

Cisternas is a common Chilean surname. Some people with this surname include:

- Carlos Cisternas, (born 1985), Chilean footballer
- Jonathan Cisternas, Chilean footballer
- María Soledad Cisternas (born 1959), Chilean lawyer, United Nations special envoy, and disability rights activist
