= Jonathan Cisternas =

Chilean footballer (born 1980)

Personal information
- Full name: Jonathan Josué Cisternas Fernández
- Date of birth: 16 June 1980 (age 46)
- Place of birth: Santiago, Chile
- Height: 1.68 m (5 ft 6 in)
- Position: Midfielder

Senior career*
Years	Team	Apps	(Gls)
2000–2002	Deportes Concepción	62	(6)
2003–2006	Cobreloa	92	(16)
2006	Universidad de Chile	13	(0)
2007	Coquimbo Unido	19	(1)
2008–2015	Ñublense	196	(29)
2015–2017	Palestino	30	(2)
Total		412	(54)

International career
2004–2006	Chile	3	(0)

Managerial career
- 2018: Colo-Colo (assistant/fitness coach)
- 2018–2019: Al Ahli (assistant/fitness coach)
- 2019–2020: Morelia (fitness coach)
- 2020–2021: Tijuana (fitness coach)
- 2022: Libertad FC (assistant)
- 2024: Cobreloa (fitness coach)
- 2025–: Deportes Temuco (assistant)
- * Club domestic league appearances and goals

Jonathan Josué Cisternas Fernández (born 16 June 1980) is a Chilean football manager and former footballer who played as midfielder. He is the current assistant coach of Deportes Temuco.

== Club career ==
Cisternas started in Deportes Concepción, which was where he stepped up to play for the Copa Libertadores in 2001, his career ended when his team were acquired in 2003 by Cobreloa, his career was even more successful because he won a double in 2003, and a Clausura tournament in 2004 and 2006.

He had a bad relationship with his coach, Jorge Aravena when he wanted to go to Universidad de Chile, where he could reach his full potential, so he then went to Coquimbo Unido, and after that continued his career in Ñublense where he became a keen player, took the club to its first international tournament which was Copa Sudamericana and was chosen to be one of the greatest midfielders of the Chilean league in 2008–2009, and by the end of 2010 he became the captain of the club.

== Managerial career ==
In 2018, Cisternas joined the technical staff of Pablo Guede in Colo-Colo as an assistant coach, turning after to fitness coach. After he was with Guede in Al Ahli, Morelia and Tijuana. In 2022, he joined the technical staff of Nelson Tapia in the Ecuadorian club Libertad FC.

In October 2024, Cisternas joined the technical staff of César Bravo in Cobreloa as the fitness coach.

== Personal life ==
His nickname is Jinete.

== Honours ==
=== Player ===
Cobreloa

- Primera División de Chile (3): 2003 Apertura, 2003 Clausura, 2004 Clausura
