= Rodrigo Pérez (footballer, born 1973) =

Chilean footballer (born 1973)

Personal information
- Full name: Rodrigo Antonio Pérez Albornoz
- Date of birth: 19 August 1973 (age 53)
- Place of birth: Rancagua, Chile
- Height: 1.78 m (5 ft 10 in)
- Position: Left-back

Team information
- Current team: Chimbarongo FC (manager)

Youth career
- 1991–1993: O'Higgins

Senior career*
Years	Team	Apps	(Gls)
1993–1996	O'Higgins	86	(4)
1997–2000	Santiago Wanderers	115	(12)
2001–2007	Cobreloa	169	(16)
2004	→ Pachuca (loan)	6	(0)
2006	→ Alianza Lima (loan)	14	(1)
2008	Unión Española	32	(2)
2009	Deportes Concepción	0	(0)
2009–2010	Municipal Iquique	57	(3)
2011	Deportes Iquique	12	(0)
Total		491	(38)

International career
1995–2005	Chile	32	(0)

Managerial career
- 2018: Cobreloa
- 2019–2020: Rancagua Sur
- 2025–2026: Deportes Rancagua
- 2026–: Chimbarongo FC
- * Club domestic league appearances and goals

Rodrigo Antonio Pérez Albornoz (born 19 August 1973) is a former Chilean footballer who played as left back. He is currently in charge of Chimbarongo FC.

== Club career ==
Pérez began his football career at his professional hometown club O'Higgins, making his professional debut aged 19, being promoted to the first adult team by the coach Manuel Pellegrini in the 1993 season, then moving to Santiago Wanderers in 1997, after three successful seasons at Rancagua. He has spent the most time in Chile playing for Cobreloa, where he was capped in 137 matches and scored 15 goals. He also spent time with the Peruvian club Alianza Lima.

== International career ==
He made his debut for the Chilean national squad in 1995.

== Coaching career ==
He began his career as the coach of the team of INAF (National Football Institute) and then he became the manager of Cobreloa in 2018 in the Primera B de Chile. He arrived to the mining club along with the former players Nelson Tapia and Eduardo Fournier. Next, he coached C.D. Rancagua Sur in the Tercera A, the fourth level of the Chilean football system league, from 2019 to 2020.

In 2025, Pérez was appointed the manager of Deportes Rancagua in the Chilean Tercera B, and got the promotion to the Tercera A after winning the Zona sur (South Zone). He left them in May 2026 and switched to Chimbarongo FC in July of the same year.

== Career statistics ==
=== International ===
Appearances and goals by national team and year
National team	Year	Apps	Goals
Chile	1995	6	0
Chile	1996	–	
Chile	1997	–	
Chile	1998	–	
Chile	1999	–	
Chile	2000	–	
Chile	2001	3	0
Chile	2002	–	
Chile	2003	9	0
Chile	2004	9	0
Chile	2005	5	0
Total		32	0

== Honours ==
=== Player ===
Cobreloa

- Primera División de Chile (3): 2003 Apertura, 2003 Clausura, 2004 Clausura

Alianza Lima

- Peruvian Primera División: 2006 Descentralizado

Deportes Iquique

- Primera B: 2010
- Copa Chile: 2010

Chile

- Canada Cup: 1995

=== Manager ===
Deportes Rancagua

- Tercera B Zona Sur: 2025
