= IFFHS World's Best Top Division Goal Scorer =

Annual football award

IFFHS World's Best Man Top Division Goal Scorer
- Sport: Association football
- Awarded for: Best top division goal scorer of the calendar year
- Presented by: International Federation of Football History & Statistics

History
- First award: 1997
- Editions: 29
- First winner: (Turkey) Hakan Şükür
- Most wins: (Argentina) Lionel Messi (4 awards)
- Most recent: (France) Kylian Mbappé (39 goals in 2025)
- Website: iffhs.com/en

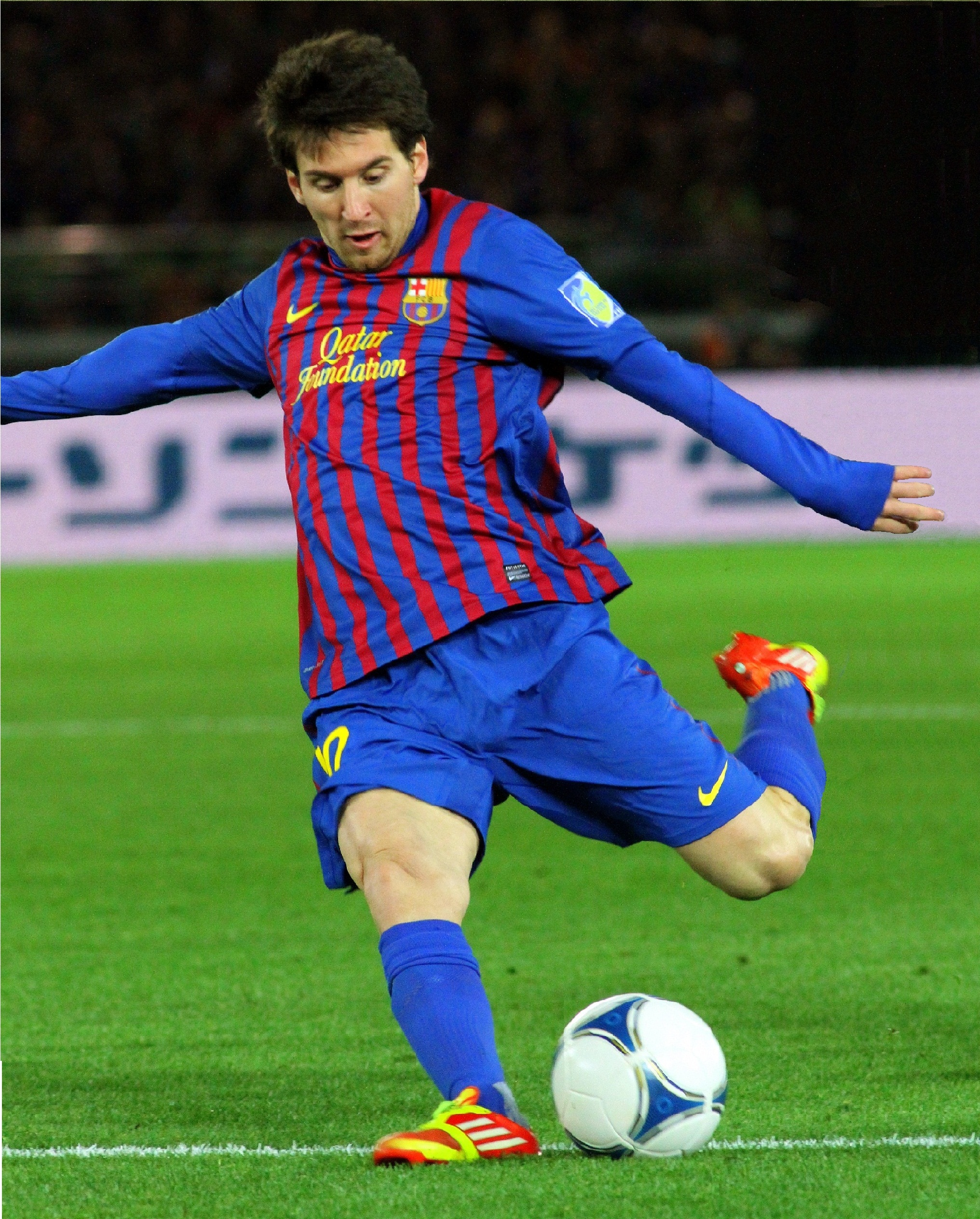
Lionel Messi has won the award a record four times.

The IFFHS World's Best Top Division Goal Scorer is a football award given annually since 1997 by the International Federation of Football History & Statistics (IFFHS) to the player who scores the most goals in a league season (in a calendar year since 2020) in any of the top 60 leagues in the world (as ranked by IFFHS for that given year).

== Men's winners ==
=== List of winners ===
| Year | Winner | Club(s) | Goals |
|---|---|---|---|
| 1997 | (Turkey) Hakan Şükür | (Turkey) Galatasaray | 38 |
| 1998 | (Ecuador) Iván Kaviedes | (Ecuador) Emelec | 43 |
| 1999 | (Brazil) Mário Jardel | (Portugal) Porto | 36 |
| 2000 | (Brazil) Mário Jardel | (Portugal) Porto | 38 |
| 2001 | (Bolivia) José Alfredo Castillo | (Bolivia) Oriente Petrolero | 42 |
| 2002 | (Bolivia) Joaquín Botero | (Bolivia) Bolívar | 49 |
| 2003 | (Paraguay) José Cardozo | (Mexico) Toluca | 58 |
| 2004 | (Chile) Patricio Galaz | (Chile) Cobreloa | 42 |
| 2005 | (Brazil) Clemerson Araújo | (Japan) Gamba Osaka | 33 |
| 2006 | (Netherlands) Klaas-Jan Huntelaar | (Netherlands) Ajax | 35 |
| 2007 | (Brazil) Afonso Alves | (Netherlands) Heerenveen | 34 |
| 2008 | (Paraguay) Lucas Barrios | (Chile) Colo-Colo | 37 |
| 2009 | (Austria) Marc Janko | (Austria) Red Bull Salzburg | 39 |
| 2010 | (Uruguay) Luis Suárez | (Netherlands) Ajax | 35 |
| 2011 | (Latvia) Aleksandrs Čekulajevs | (Estonia) Narva Trans | 46 |
| 2012 | (Argentina) Lionel Messi | (Spain) Barcelona | 50 |
| 2013 | (Argentina) Lionel Messi | (Spain) Barcelona | 46 |
| 2014 | (Portugal) Cristiano Ronaldo | (Spain) Real Madrid | 31 |
| 2014 | (Uruguay) Luis Suárez | (England) Liverpool | 31 |
| 2015 | (Portugal) Cristiano Ronaldo | (Spain) Real Madrid | 48 |
| 2016 | (Uruguay) Luis Suárez | (Spain) Barcelona | 40 |
| 2017 | (Argentina) Lionel Messi | (Spain) Barcelona | 37 |
| 2018 | (Argentina) Lionel Messi | (Spain) Barcelona | 34 |
| 2018 | (Brazil) Jonas | (Portugal) Benfica | 34 |
| 2019 | (Algeria) Baghdad Bounedjah | (Qatar) Al Sadd | 39 |
Calendar year
| 2020 | (Portugal) Cristiano Ronaldo | (Italy) Juventus | 33 |
| 2021 | (Poland) Robert Lewandowski | (Germany) Bayern Munich | 43 |
| 2022 | (Argentina) Germán Cano | (Brazil) Fluminense | 33 |
| 2023 | (England) Harry Kane | (England) Tottenham Hotspur (Germany) Bayern Munich | 38 |
| 2024 | (Sweden) Viktor Gyökeres | (Portugal) Sporting CP | 36 |
| 2025 | (France) Kylian Mbappé | (Spain) Real Madrid | 39 |

=== Statistics ===
Multiple winners (1997–present)
| Player | Wins | Years |
|---|---|---|
| (Argentina) Lionel Messi | 4 | 2012, 2013, 2017, 2018 (shared) |
| (Uruguay) Luis Suárez | 3 | 2010, 2014 (shared), 2016 |
| (Portugal) Cristiano Ronaldo | 3 | 2014 (shared), 2015, 2020 |
| (Brazil) Mário Jardel | 2 | 1999, 2000 |

=== The World's Best Top Division Goal Scorer of the First Decade (2001–2010) ===
The final list includes the 18 players who scored 150 or more goals in top-tier national leagues in the period of time from 1 January 2001 to 31 December 2010.

The results were posted on the IFFHS' official website on 25 September 2022.

Players with at least 180 goals
| Rank | Player | Nation | Goals | Club(s) |
|---|---|---|---|---|
| 1 | Aleksandar Đurić | Singapore | 246 | Geylang United (2001–04); Singapore Armed Forces FC (2005–09); Tampines Rovers (2010) |
| 2 | Marc Lloyd Williams | Wales | 236 | (Wales) Bangor City (2001–02; 2003; 2006–07) (England) Southport (2002–03) (Wales) Aberystwyth Town (2003–04) (Wales) The New Saints (2004–06) (Wales) Newtown (2007–08) (Wales) Rhyl (2008) (Wales) Porthmadog (2008–09) (Wales) Airbus UK Broughton (2009–10) |
| 3 | Washington | Brazil | 214 | (Brazil) Ponte Preta (2001–02) (Turkey) Fenerbahçe (2002–03) (Brazil) Athletico Paranaense (2004) (Japan) Tokyo Verdy (2005) (Japan) Urawa Red Diamonds (2006–07) (Brazil) Fluminense (2008; 2010) (Brazil) São Paulo (2009–10) |
| 4 | Rhys Griffiths | Wales | 198 | (Wales) Cwmbrân Town (2001–02) (Wales) Haverfordwest County (2002–04) (Wales) Carmarthen Town (2004) (Wales) Port Talbot Town (2004–06) (Wales) Llanelli Town (2006–10) |
| 5 | Thierry Henry | France | 182 | (England) Arsenal (2001–07) (Spain) Barcelona (2007–10) |
| 6 | Magno Alves | Brazil | 182 | (Brazil) Fluminense (2001–02) (South Korea) Jeonbuk Hyundai Motors (2003) (Japan) Oita Trinita (2004–05) (Japan) Gamba Osaka (2006–07) (Saudi Arabia) Al-Ittihad (2007–08) (Qatar) Umm Salal (2008–10) |
| 7 | Maksim Gruznov | Estonia | 180 | (Estonia) Narva Trans (2001–08) (Estonia) Sillamäe Kalev (2009–10) |

=== The World's Best Top Division Goal Scorer of the Second Decade (2011–2020) ===
The final list includes the 36 players who scored 150 or more goals in top-tier national leagues in the period of time from 1 January 2011 to 31 December 2020.

The results were posted on the IFFHS' official website on 6 January 2021.

Players with at least 200 goals
| Rank | Player | Nation | Goals | Club(s) |
|---|---|---|---|---|
| 1 | Lionel Messi | Argentina | 346 | (Spain) Barcelona (2011–20) |
| 2 | Cristiano Ronaldo | Portugal | 332 | (Spain) Real Madrid (2011–18) (Italy) Juventus (2018–20) |
| 3 | Robert Lewandowski | Poland | 248 | (Germany) Borussia Dortmund (2011–14) (Germany) Bayern Munich (2014–20) |
| 4 | Zlatan Ibrahimović | Sweden | 236 | (Italy) Milan (2011–12; 2019–20) (France) Paris Saint-Germain (2012–16) (England) Manchester United (2016–18) (United States) LA Galaxy (2018–19) |
| 5 | Luis Suárez | Uruguay | 224 | (England) Liverpool (2011–14) (Spain) Barcelona (2014–20) (Spain) Atlético Madrid (2020) |
| 6 | Carlos Saucedo | Bolivia | 213 | (Bolivia) San José (2012–13; 2017–19) (Costa Rica) Saprissa (2014) (Bolivia) Oriente Petrolero (2015) (Bolivia) Blooming (2015–16) (Bolivia) Real Potosí (2016) (Bolivia) Guabirá (2017) (Bolivia) Royal Pari (2020) |
| 7 | Edinson Cavani | Uruguay | 209 | (Italy) Napoli (2011–13) (France) Paris Saint-Germain (2013–20) (England) Manchester United (2020) |

=== All-time World's Best Top Division Goal Scorer ranking ===
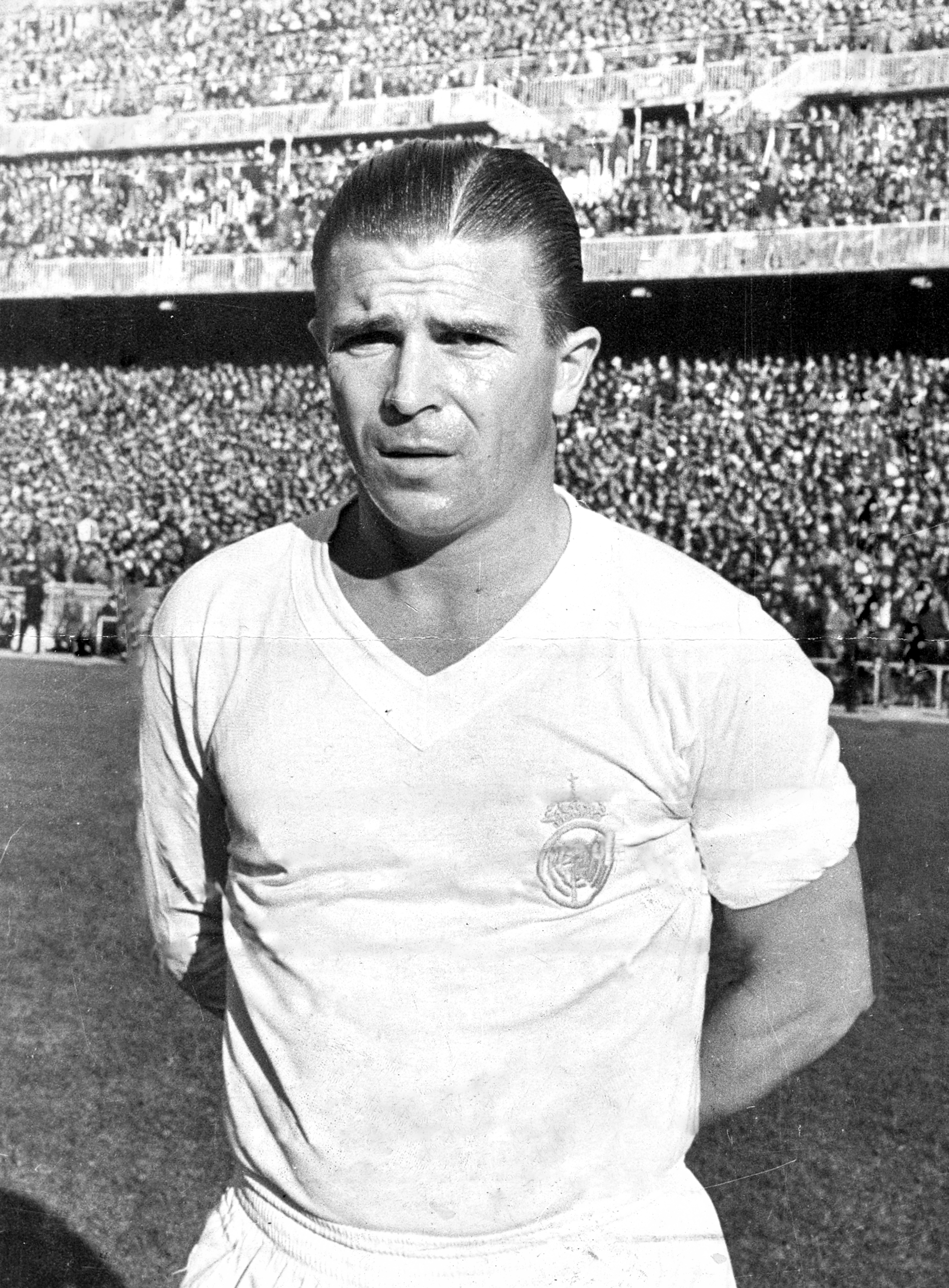
Ferenc Puskás

As of 9 November 2025
Bold indicates players currently active.

Players with at least 400 goals
| Rank | Player | Goals |
|---|---|---|
| 1 | **(Portugal) Cristiano Ronaldo** | 581 |
| 2 | **(Argentina) Lionel Messi** | 552 |
| 3 | (Austria) (Czechoslovakia) Josef Bican | 515 |
| 3 | (Hungary) (Spain) Ferenc Puskás | 515 |
| 5 | (Poland) **Robert Lewandowski** | 420 |
| 6 | (Uruguay) **Luis Suárez** | 419 |
| 7 | (Hungary) Imre Schlosser | 417 |
| 8 | (Hungary) Gyula Zsengellér | 416 |
| 9 | (Scotland) Jimmy McGrory | 409 |
| 10 | (Germany) Gerd Müller | 405 |

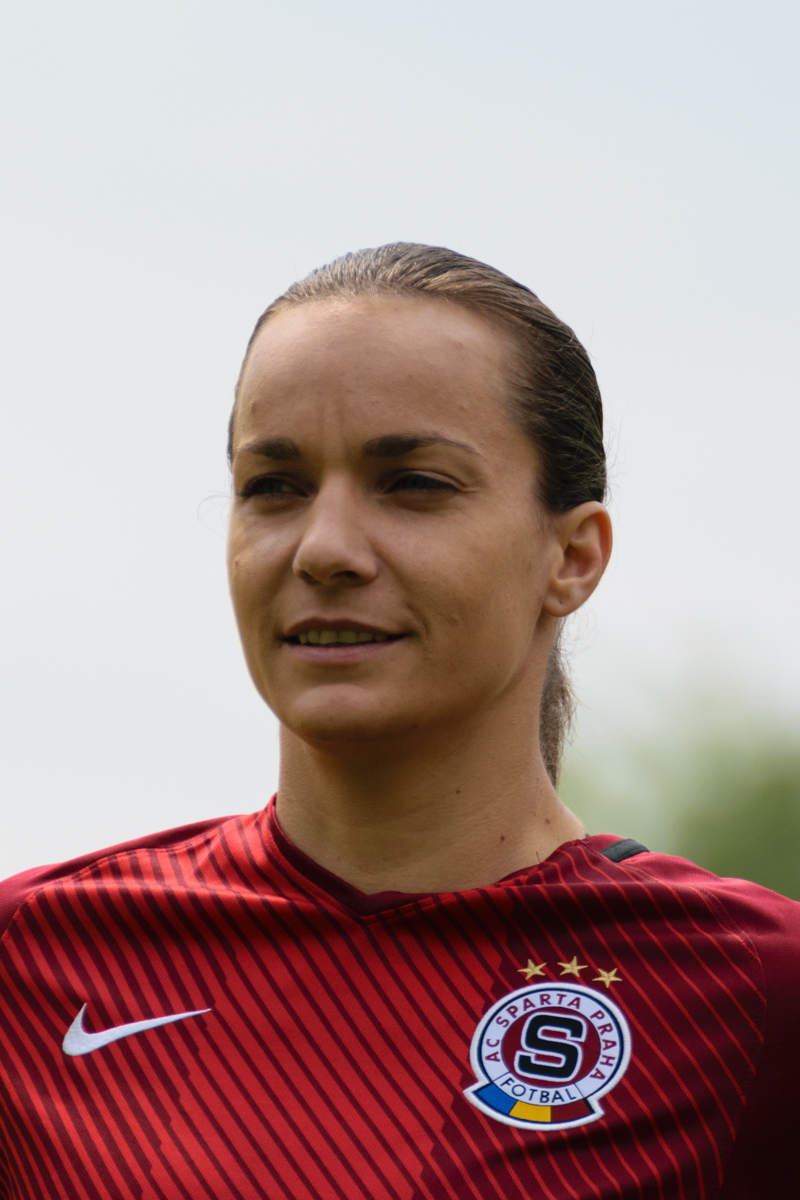
Lucie Martínková was the top women's goal scorer for club in 2021.

== Women's winners ==
=== List of winners ===
The women's award was introduced in 2021.

| Year | Winner | Club | Goals |
|---|---|---|---|
| 2021 | (Czech Republic) Lucie Martínková | (Czech Republic) Sparta Prague | 38 |
| 2022 | (United States) Mia Fishel | (Mexico) UANL | 33 |
| 2023 | (Mexico) Charlyn Corral | (Mexico) Pachuca | 34 |
| 2024 | (Mexico) Charlyn Corral | (Mexico) Pachuca | 42 |
| 2025 | (Mexico) Charlyn Corral | (Mexico) Pachuca | 50 |

== See also ==
- International Federation of Football History & Statistics
- IFFHS World's Best International Goal Scorer
- IFFHS World's Best National Coach
- IFFHS World's Best Club Coach
- IFFHS World's Best Goalkeeper
- IFFHS World's Best Player
- IFFHS World's Best Club
- IFFHS World Team
