= Johnny Herrera (footballer) =

Chilean footballer (born 1981)

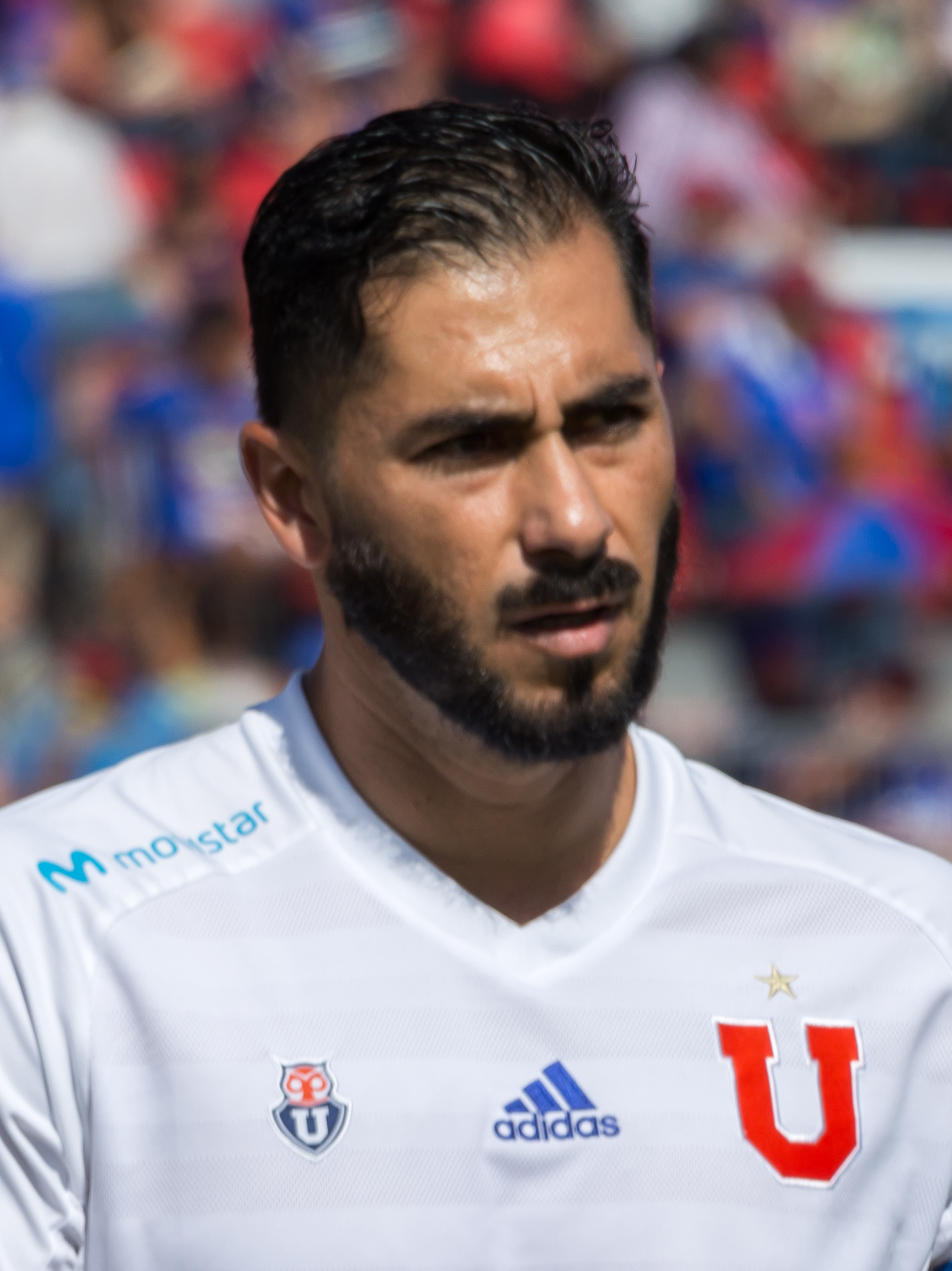
- Herrera with Universidad de Chile in 2019

Personal information
- Full name: Johnny Cristián Herrera Muñoz
- Date of birth: 9 May 1981 (age 45)
- Place of birth: Angol, Chile
- Height: 1.84 m (6 ft 0 in)
- Position: Goalkeeper

Youth career
- 1995–2000: Universidad de Chile

Senior career*
Years	Team	Apps	(Gls)
1999–2005	Universidad de Chile	123	(0)
2006	Corinthians	9	(0)
2007–2008	Everton	60	(0)
2008–2010	Audax Italiano	91	(0)
2011–2019	Universidad de Chile	259	(4)
2020	Everton	22	(1)
Total		564	(5)

International career
2000	Chile Olympic	1	(0)
2001	Chile U20	2	(0)
2002–2018	Chile	24	(0)
Medal record
Representing Chile
Third place	Summer Olympics	2000
Winner	Copa América	2015
Winner	Copa América Centenario	2016
Runner-up	FIFA Confederations Cup	2017
- * Club domestic league appearances and goals

Johnny Cristián Herrera Muñoz (Spanish pronunciation: [ˈɟʝonjeˈreɾa], born 9 May 1981) is a Chilean former professional footballer who played as a goalkeeper.

He has played the most part of his career at Universidad de Chile, winning for the club eight league titles, a Copa Sudamericana, three cup titles and a supercup in 2015.

He has represented Chilean football team at U20 level and Olympic level too, playing 21 official times for the adult team.

Herrera has been part of Chile's both Copa América titles in 2015 and 2016.

== Club career ==
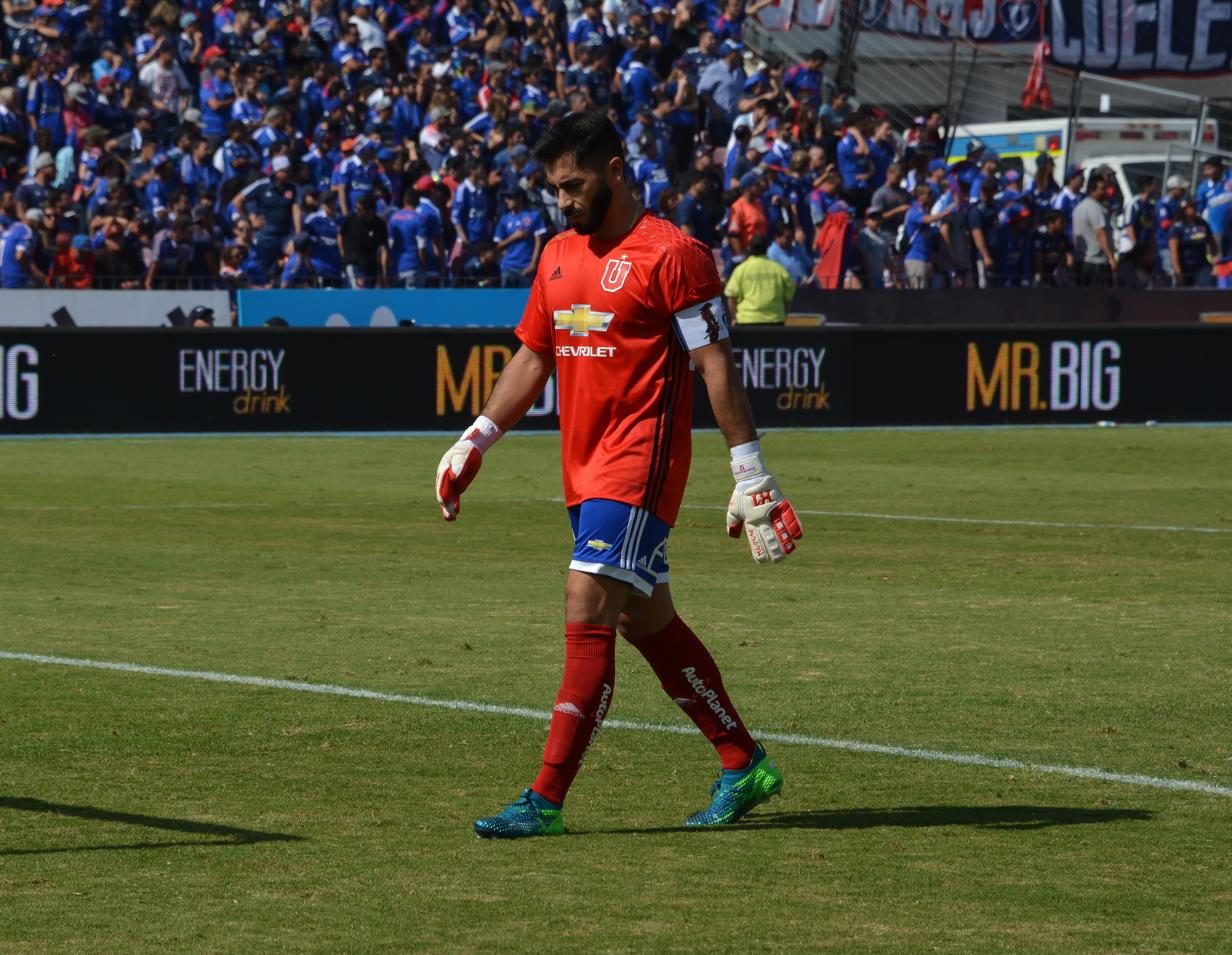
Herrera playing for the "U" in 2018

Born in Angol, Herrera joined Universidad de Chile youth squad and was promoted to the first/adult team in 1999. Three years later, he became the first-choice keeper after being back-up for Sergio Vargas, who left The Lions after 10 years playing there. In 2004, Herrera won his first professional title after defeating Cobreloa as visitors in the Torneo Apertura final, where he scored the winning goal during the shootout, giving the club their twelfth League title. During those years, Herrera collated his football career with his studies, area where he was dedicated to the Pedagogy in Physical Education, a career he studied at the University of the Americas (UDLA).

In 2006, Herrera moved to Brazilian club Corinthians. Following an unsuccessful spell at Brazil — where only played nine official games — he returned to Chile and signed for Everton from Vina del Mar in 2007. There, he helped the team to win the 2008 Torneo Apertura. However, in June 2008, Herrera left Everton to sign for Audax Italiano.

In 2011, Herrera returned to Universidad de Chile. That year he had a brilliant season, being a major figure in the club's first treble in its history after winning both league tournaments (Apertura and Clausura) and the Copa Sudamericana, under the guidance of coach Jorge Sampaoli. Noteworthy, Herrera was even chosen as the goalkeeper of the season by Conmebol. In 2012, he helped Universidad de Chile to win the Torneo Apertura, which meant the club's first ever league tri-championship, as well as the last reached during the Sampaoli era.

On 20 May 2013, he featured in Universidad de Chile's 2–1 victory over Universidad Católica in the 2012–13 Copa Chile Final, the club's fourth cup in the contest. On 18 March 2014, Herrera scored his first official goal in a 1–0 Copa Libertadores group stage win over Peru's Real Garcilaso, through a penalty kick. The same year he helped the club win the Torneo Apertura. His first League goal came on 22 November during a University Derby against Católica in a 2–2 draw. On 2 December, Herrera won his twelfth professional title after defeating in the Copa Chile Final to rivals Colo-Colo in the shootout, where he saved a penalty and scored the winning goal.

On 13 February 2016, he scored his third official goal in a 2–1 defeat to Palestino, scoring from a penalty.

== International career ==
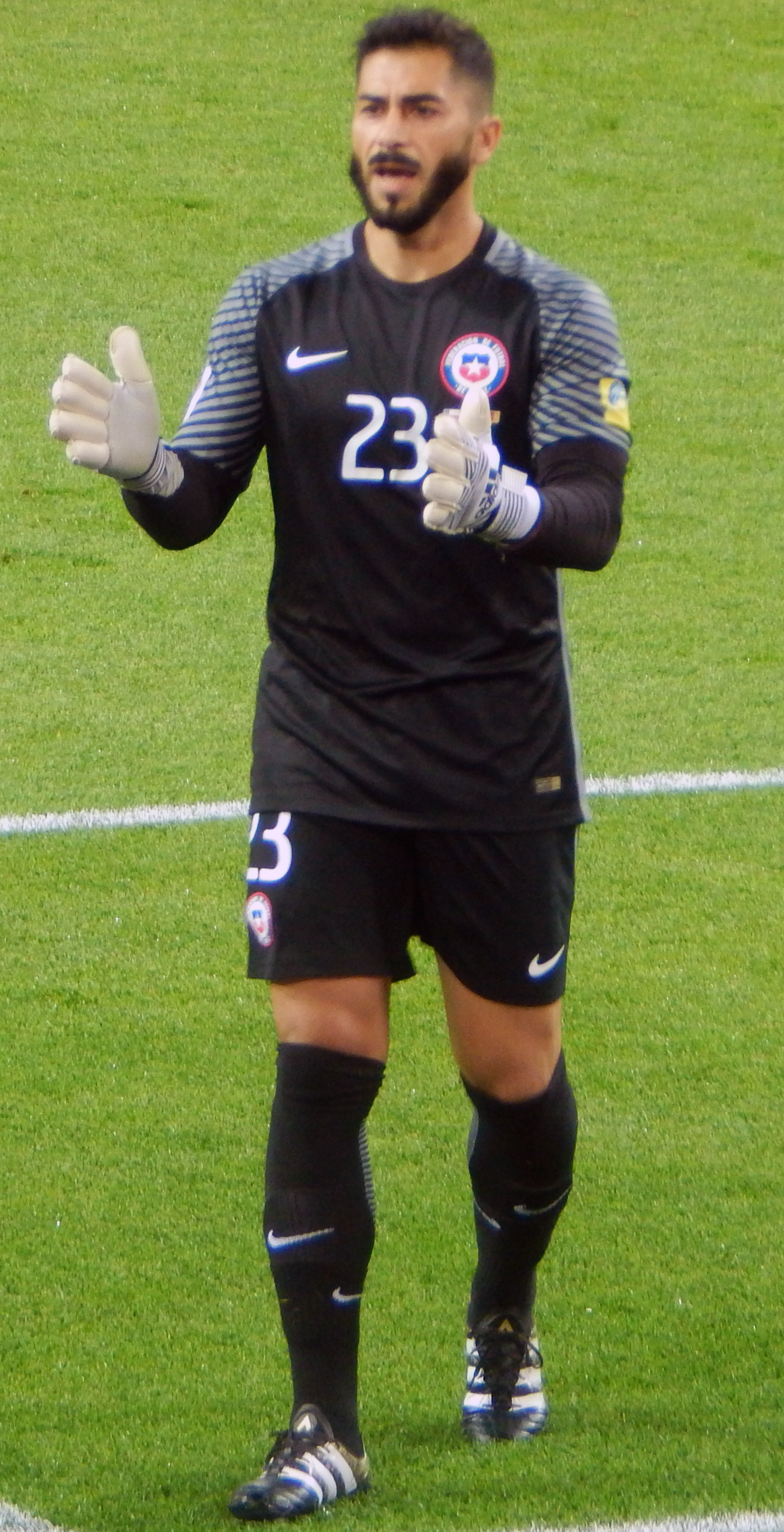
Herrera with the Chile national team in 2017

Herrera has been representing the Chile national team since he was a youth player, participating in its U-20 and U-23 levels, the latter as one of the 23 players nominated to the 2000 Summer Olympics in Sydney. His first call-up to the senior team was in 2002 in a game against Mexico; his last was in 2005. Years later, during the best moment of his career between 2011 and 2012 playing for Universidad de Chile, Herrera curiously did not receive nominations from Claudio Borghi, the incumbent coach. The press usually alluded to an internal dispute between them, but with Borghi's departure in December 2012, the situation changed in Herrera's favor.

After almost seven years of absence, Herrera was reconsidered by Jorge Sampaoli, who finally took the helm. He received his first call up from Sampaoli for the friendly matches against Haiti and Senegal in January 2013, where he stated that Herrera would play against Haiti, rotating the goal-keeping duties with Christopher Toselli. Nevertheless, he played both games which were 2–1 and 3–0 wins respectively.

On 5 March 2014, Herrera played against Germany in Stuttgart replacing first-choice Claudio Bravo who missed the match due to injury. Chile lost 1–0 through a Mario Götze goal.

Having been part of the entire qualification campaign since Sampaoli's taking, Herrera was named in Chile's list of 23 for the FIFA World Cup in Brazil. On 5 June, he played in a 2–0 friendly win over Northern Ireland, prior to the World Cup.

He was part of the 2015 Copa América champion team as back-up keeper to Claudio Bravo as well as in the 2016 Centenario edition.

In 2017, he was nominated to the Confederations Cup and played two matches against Cameroon (a 2–0 victory) and Australia (a 1–1 draw). That cup, Chile was runner-up after being defeated 1–0 by Germany in the final.

== Post-retirement ==
Since 2019, Herrera has performed sporadically as a football commentator in media such as Radio Cooperativa. Following his retirement from football, in 2021 he definitely joined TNT Sports Chile to be a panelist for the TV program Todos Somos Técnicos (We Are All Coaches).

In September 2026, Herrera announced his joining to MT1000 Santiago tournament of ITF World Tennis Masters Tour to take place in November of the same year.

== Honours ==
=== Club ===
Universidad de Chile

- Primera División de Chile (8): 1999, 2000, 2004 Apertura, 2011 Apertura, 2011 Clausura, 2012 Apertura, 2014 Apertura, 2017 Clausura
- Copa Sudamericana: 2011
- Copa Chile: 2000, 2012–13, 2015
- Supercopa de Chile: 2015

Everton

- Primera División de Chile: 2008 Apertura

=== International ===
Chile

- Copa América: 2015, 2016

=== Individual ===
- Campeonato Nacional (Chile) Goalkeeper of the Season: 2011
- CONMEBOL Goalkeeper of the Season: 2011
- Copa Sudamericana Team of the Season: 2011
- Campeonato Nacional (Chile) Team of the Season: 2010, 2011, 2012

== See also ==
- List of goalscoring goalkeepers
