= 2004 Torneo Clausura (Chile) =

Campeonato Nacional Clausura Copa Banco del Estado
- Season: 2004
- Dates: 31 July – 19 December 2004
- Champions: Cobreloa; 8th title
- Relegated: none
- 2005 Copa Libertadores: Cobreloa; Colo-Colo (Clausura Best position)
- Matches played: 180
- Goals scored: 557 (3.09 per match)
- Top goalscorer: Patricio Galaz (19 goals)
- Biggest home win: Cobreloa 6–0 Everton (17 September)
- Biggest away win: Coquimbo Unido 3–7 Colo-Colo (19 February)
- Highest attendance: 42,000; Universidad de Chile 0–1 Colo-Colo (1 August)
- Total attendance: 815,797
- Average attendance: 4,532

The 2004 Campeonato Nacional Clausura Copa Banco del Estado was the 76th Chilean League top flight, in which Cobreloa won its 8th league title after beating Unión Española in the finals.

== Qualifying stage ==
=== Results ===
	AUD	CLO	CSA	COL	COQ	EVE	HUA	DLS	PAL	DPM	RAN	SFE	DTE	UCA	UCH	UCO	UES	SWA
Audax		2–2		1–2			3–0		0–0			3–1	4–0	2–3	1–1		1–1	
Cobreloa			1–1		3–1	6–0	2–0	1–1		2–1	5–2					2–3		1–1
Cobresal	1–1				2–1	0–1	1–3	6–1		4–2	2–1					3–2		5–1
Colo-Colo		2–2	4–0			1–1		3–1		1–0	0–0		2–1	1–1				
Coquimbo U.	1–3			1–0					2–2			0–0			1–3	2–0	2–2	3–2
Everton	4–2				2–0		2–0		0–1	1–1	4–0				0–0	2–1		0–1
Huachipato				2–2	1–0					3–1	4–0		2–2	1–2			0–1	1–2
La Serena	3–1				2–1	3–0	1–3			0–1	1–1				1–3	0–1		3–2
Palestino		1–1	1–0	2–3			2–3	5–1				2–1	1–2	0–3			2–1	
Puerto Montt	0–2				0–2				1–0		3–0	1–1			2–0	0–0		1–0
Rangers	1–2				0–0				2–3			1–1			0–1	2–1	3–2	4–2
San Felipe		1–3	1–1	1–5		1–1	1–0	2–0					1–0	1–0			0–2	
Temuco		4–4	3–3		1–1	2–1		3–3		4–2	2–2							3–3
U. Católica		2–1	0–1		3–3	5–0		4–1		0–0	0–0		3–2					
U. de Chile		2–1	2–0	0–1			2–1		4–1			3–0	2–2	0–0			2–2	
U. Concepción	1–3			2–0			2–0		2–0			1–0	0–0	4–1	0–0		1–0	
U. Española		2–0	1–2	3–0		2–1		1–1		0–0			2–3	1–2				
S. Wanderers	3–2			1–2					2–0			2–4		1–3	1–2	0–1	0–1	

=== Group standings ===
==== Group A ====
Pos	Team	Pld	W	D	L	GF	GA	GD	Pts	Qualification
1	Audax Italiano	17	7	5	5	34	24	+10	26	Qualify to the playoffs
2	Cobreloa	17	6	7	4	37	26	+11	25	Qualify to the playoffs
3	Unión Española	17	6	5	6	24	20	+4	23	Qualify to the playoffs
4	Deportes La Serena	17	4	4	9	23	38	−15	16	

==== Group B ====
Pos	Team	Pld	W	D	L	GF	GA	GD	Pts	Qualification
1	Coquimbo Unido	17	4	6	7	21	26	−5	18	Qualify to the playoffs
2	Unión San Felipe	17	4	6	7	18	25	−7	18	Qualify to the playoffs
3	Deportes Puerto Montt	17	4	5	8	16	20	−4	17	Qualify to the repechaje
4	Santiago Wanderers	17	4	2	11	24	36	−12	14	

==== Group C ====
Pos	Team	Pld	W	D	L	GF	GA	GD	Pts	Qualification
1	Colo-Colo	17	9	5	3	28	18	+10	32	Qualify to the playoffs
2	Universidad de Chile	17	8	6	3	27	14	+13	30	Qualify to the playoffs
3	Deportes Temuco	17	4	9	4	34	36	−2	21	Qualify to the playoffs
4	Palestino	17	6	3	8	23	28	−5	21	
5	Rangers	17	3	6	8	19	33	−14	15	

==== Group D ====
Pos	Team	Pld	W	D	L	GF	GA	GD	Pts	Qualification
1	Universidad Católica	17	9	5	3	32	19	+13	32	Qualify to the playoffs
2	Cobresal	17	8	4	5	32	26	+6	28	Qualify to the playoffs
3	Universidad de Concepción	17	8	4	5	22	16	+6	28	Qualify to the playoffs
4	Everton	17	6	4	7	20	26	−6	22	Qualify to the repechaje
5	Huachipato	17	6	2	9	24	26	−2	20	

=== Aggregate table ===
Pos	Team	Pld	W	D	L	GF	GA	GD	Pts	Qualification
1	Universidad Católica	17	9	5	3	32	19	+13	32	Playoffs
2	Colo-Colo	17	9	5	3	28	18	+10	32	Playoffs
3	Universidad de Chile	17	8	6	3	27	14	+13	30	Playoffs
4	Cobresal	17	8	4	5	32	26	+6	28	Playoffs
5	Universidad de Concepción	17	8	4	5	22	16	+6	28	Playoffs
6	Audax Italiano	17	7	5	5	34	24	+10	26	Playoffs
7	Cobreloa	17	6	7	4	37	26	+11	25	Playoffs
8	Unión Española	17	6	5	6	24	20	+4	23	Playoffs
9	Everton	17	6	4	7	20	26	−6	22	Repechaje
10	Deportes Temuco	17	4	9	4	34	36	−2	21	Playoffs
11	Palestino	17	6	3	8	23	28	−5	21	
12	Huachipato	17	6	2	9	24	26	−2	20	
13	Coquimbo Unido	17	4	6	7	21	26	−5	18	Playoffs
14	Unión San Felipe	17	4	6	7	18	25	−7	18	Playoffs
15	Deportes Puerto Montt	17	4	5	8	16	20	−4	17	Repechaje
16	La Serena	17	4	4	9	23	38	−15	16	
17	Rangers	17	3	6	8	19	33	−14	15	
18	Santiago Wanderers	17	4	2	11	24	36	−12	14	

==== Repechaje ====
Match	Home	Visitor	Result
1	Deportes Puerto Montt	Everton	1–2

== Playoffs ==
=== First round ===
Match	Home	Visitor	1st Leg	2nd Leg	Aggregate
1	Cobreloa	Audax Italiano	5–2	1–2	6–4
2	Unión Española	Universidad de Concepción	0–0	1–1	1–1 (3–1 p)
3	Everton	Cobresal	3–2	0–1	3–3 (1–3 p)
4	Coquimbo Unido	Colo-Colo	3–7	1–1	4–8
5	Unión San Felipe	Universidad Católica	2–2	0–3	2–5
6	Deportes Temuco	Universidad de Chile	2–0	0–2	2–2 (3–5 p)

=== Knockout stage ===
Quarterfinals
5	Cobresal	1	2	3
7	Cobreloa	2	2	4
2	Colo-Colo	3	3	6
9	Everton	1	4	5
3	Universidad de Chile	3	3	6 (2)
8	Unión Española (p)	4	2	6 (4)
1	Universidad Católica	1	6	7
10	Deportes Temuco	3	2	5

Semifinals
8	Cobreloa	4	1	5
2	Colo-Colo	1	1	2
8	Unión Española (p)	3	1	4 (4)
1	Universidad Católica	1	3	4 (3)

Finals
8	Unión Española	1	0	1
7	Cobreloa	3	0	3

=== Finals ===
16 December 2004
1st Leg

Unión Española	1–3	Cobreloa
Jerez 68'	Report	D. Pérez 28'; R. Pérez 52'; Miranda 80' (o.g.)

Estadio Santa Laura, Santiago
Attendance: 14,175
Referee: Rubén Selman

19 December 2004
2nd Leg

Cobreloa	0–0	Unión Española
	Report

Estadio Municipal de Calama, Calama
Attendance: 11,096
Referee: Pablo Pozo

2004 Clausura winners
Cobreloa
8th title

== Top goalscorers ==
Rank	Player	Club	Goals
1	(Chile) Patricio Galaz	Cobreloa	19
2	(Chile) Humberto Suazo	Audax Italiano	17
3	(Chile) César Díaz	Cobresal	14
4	(Colombia) Alex Comas	Unión Española	12
4	(Argentina) Sergio Gioino	Universidad de Chile	12
6	(Chile) Marcelo Corrales	Coquimbo Unido	11
7	(Chile) Daniel Pérez	Unión Española	10
7	(Chile) Cristián Canío	Deportes Temuco	10
