= José Luis Sierra (footballer, born 1968) =

Chilean football coach and former player (born 1968)

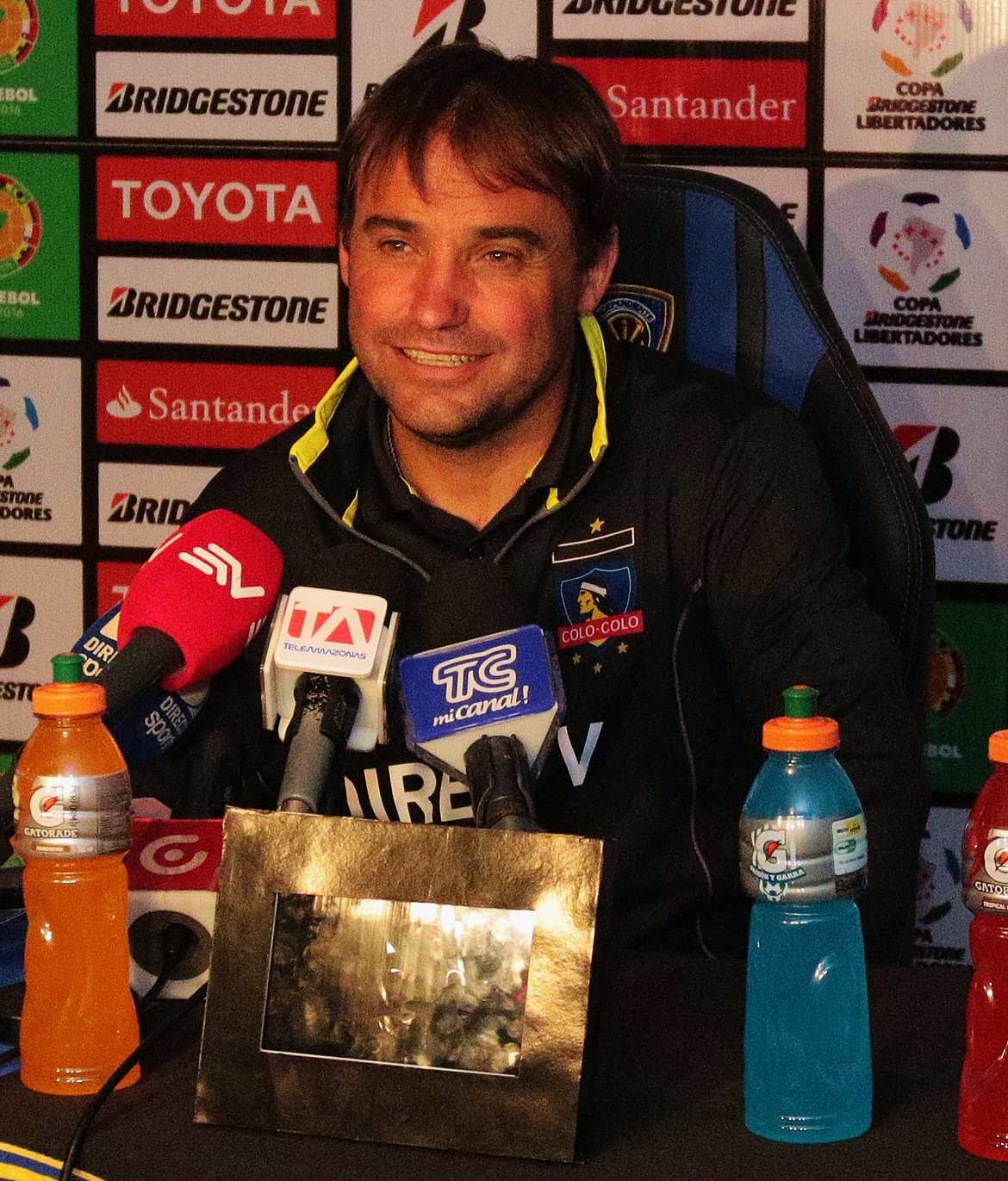
- Sierra in 2016

Personal information
- Full name: José Luis Sierra Pando
- Date of birth: 5 December 1968 (age 57)
- Place of birth: Santiago, Chile
- Height: 1.81 m (5 ft 11 1/2 in)
- Position: Attacking midfielder

Team information
- Current team: Al-Wakrah (manager)

Youth career
- 1985–1988: Unión Española

Senior career*
Years	Team	Apps	(Gls)
1988–1994	Unión Española	128	(29)
1989–1990	→ Valladolid (loan)	3	(0)
1995	São Paulo	8	(1)
1996–2001	Colo-Colo	145	(42)
1999	→ UANL (loan)	13	(1)
2002–2009	Unión Española	248	(61)
Total		545	(134)

International career
1991–2000	Chile	53	(8)

Managerial career
- 2010–2015: Unión Española
- 2015–2016: Colo-Colo
- 2016–2018: Al-Ittihad
- 2018: Shabab Al-Ahli
- 2019: Al-Ittihad
- 2020–2021: Palestino
- 2021–2022: Al-Tai
- 2022–2023: Al-Wehda
- 2024–2025: Unión Española
- 2025: Al-Wehda
- 2026–: Al-Wakrah
- * Club domestic league appearances and goals

José Luis "Coto" Sierra Pando (born 5 December 1968) is a Chilean football coach and former player who manages Al-Wakrah.

Playing in the midfield, he retired in 2009, and one year later he became the coach of his long-time team Unión Española.

== Club career ==
=== Unión Española ===
Sierra made his debut in professional soccer with Unión Española in November 1988 against the Universidad de Chile. After two solid campaigns with Unión Española, Sierra was transferred to Real Valladolid in Spain. However, during Sierra's short time in Spain, the team had economic problems which caused him to return to Unión Española. After more success he made his debut with the Chile national team. Sierra won the Copa Chile with Unión Española in 1992 and 1993.

=== Colo-Colo ===
After an unsuccessful stint in Brazil playing for São Paulo, he went on to spend three successful years with Colo-Colo, which saw his team capture the championship in all three seasons. Currently Sierra has found his way back to Unión Española, making a stop in between to play with UANL Tigres in Mexico for one season. He captured the Golden Boot in Chile (awarded to the best professional football player in Chile) in 2004 and 2005.

In 1997, it was widely rumoured that then Premier League side Everton manager Howard Kendall had made an approach to bring Sierra to Goodison Park. However, for unknown reasons, possibly relating to lack of sufficient capital, Kendall decided to pull the plug on the deal.

=== Return to Unión Española ===
Sierra announced his retirement in December 2008 and accepted the position of manager with his beloved Unión Española. He will continue on the position until the end of the Clausura 2009 tournament.

== International career ==
Sierra was capped 53 times and scored eight goals for the Chile national team between 1991 and 2000. He played four games at the 1998 FIFA World Cup, scoring a goal on a free-kick against Cameroon.

== Coaching career ==
Sierra started coaching in 2010 of Chilean club Unión Española and spent five years there. He won the 2013 Torneo Transición with them. Unión won the Apertura Tournament of 2013, after defeating Colo-Colo 1–0 in the final match. In 2015, he became the coach of Colo-Colo. In only one season, he won the 2015 Torneo Apertura title with and also led them into the 2015 Copa Chile. On July 22, 2016, he signed a one-year contract with eight-time Saudi champions Al-Ittihad with an option to sign for another season.

On 7 November 2021, Sierra was appointed as the manager of Saudi Arabian club Al-Tai.

On 20 October 2022, Sierra was appointed as manager of Al-Wehda.

== Personal life ==
His parents, Domingo Sierra and Pilar Pando, are Spanish immigrants in Chile of Galician and Asturian origin, respectively.

He studied in the Colegio Hispano Americano, which belongs to Spanish residents in Chile.

Belonging to a football family, his father was a director of Unión Española and his great uncle, Félix Cantín, was a doctor and midfielder of Unión Deportiva Española from 1928 to 1932.

His son of the same name, José Luis Jr., was a Chile international at under-20 level and his brother-in-law, Sebastián Miranda, is a football manager and former professional footballer in Chile and abroad. His nephew, Benjamín Sierra, who is also the nephew of Sebastián Miranda, plays at the Spanish Kings League.

== Career statistics ==
=== Club ===
Appearances and goals by club, season and competition
Club	Season	League			Cup		Continental		Total	
Club	Season	Division	Apps	Goals	Apps	Goals	Apps	Goals	Apps	Goals
Unión Española	1989	Primera División	14	2	21	13	—		35	15
Unión Española	1990	Primera División	25	8	—		—		25	8
Unión Española	1991	Primera División	21	3	13	4	—		34	7
Unión Española	1992	Primera División	34	9	15	2	—		49	11
Unión Española	1993	Primera División	26	5	16	6	—		42	11
Unión Española	1994	Primera División	8	2	1	2	10	1	19	5
Unión Española	Total		128	29	66	27	10	1	204	57
Real Valladolid (loan)	1989–90	La Liga	3	0	1	0	—		4	0
São Paulo	1995	Série A	8	1	—		—		8	1
Colo-Colo	1996	Primera División	23	5	9	1	5	1	37	7
Colo-Colo	1997	Primera División	26	9	—		15	2	41	11
Colo-Colo	1998	Primera División	28	11	2	0	13	0	43	11
Colo-Colo	1999	Primera División	20	4	—		4	0	24	4
Colo-Colo	2000	Primera División	25	7	6	5	3	0	34	12
Colo-Colo	2001	Primera División	23	6	—		5	0	28	6
Colo-Colo	Total		145	42	17	6	45	3	207	51
Tigres (loan)	1999	Liga MX	13	1	—		—		13	1
Unión Española	2002	Primera División	30	5	—		—		30	5
Unión Española	2003	Primera División	33	8	—		—		33	8
Unión Española	2004	Primera División	46	23	—		—		46	23
Unión Española	2005	Primera División	40	9	—		—		40	9
Unión Española	2006	Primera División	32	5	—		6	1	38	6
Unión Española	2007	Primera División	33	7	—		—		33	7
Unión Española	2008	Primera División	34	4	3	2	—		37	6
Unión Española	Total		248	61	3	2	6	1	257	64
Unión Española Total			376	90	80	29	16	2	472	121
Career total			545	134	98	35	61	5	704	174

=== International ===
Appearances and goals by national team and year
National team	Year	Apps	Goals
Chile	1991	1	0
Chile	1993	8	3
Chile	1994	2	0
Chile	1995	3	0
Chile	1996	3	0
Chile	1997	6	0
Chile	1998	13	2
Chile	1999	7	1
Chile	2000	11	2
Total		54	8

List of international goals scored by José Luis Sierra
No.	Date	Venue	Opponent	Score	Result	Competition
1.	31 March 1993	Estadio Carlos Dittborn, Arica, Chile	Bolivia	2–1	2–1	Friendly
2.	13 June 1993	Estadio Hernando Siles, La Paz, Bolivia	Bolivia	1–0	3–1	Friendly
3.	21 June 1993	Estadio Alejandro Serrano Aguilar, Cuenca, Ecuador	Brazil	1–0	3–2	1993 Copa América
4.	31 May 1998	Stade Municipal Tropenas, Montélimar, France	Tunisia	2–2	3–2	Friendly
5.	23 June 1998	Stade de la Beaujoire, Nantes, France	Cameroon	1–0	1–1	1998 FIFA World Cup
6.	3 July 1999	Estadio Antonio Oddone Sarubbi, Ciudad del Este, Paraguay	Venezuela	2–0	3–0	1999 Copa América
7.	12 February 2000	Estadio Municipal de Valparaíso, Valparaíso, Chile	Bulgaria	3–0	3–2	Copa Ciudad de Valparaíso
8.	22 March 2000	Estadio Nacional, Santiago, Chile	Honduras	2–1	5–2	Friendly

Scores and results list Chile's goal tally first.

== Managerial statistics ==
As of 16 October 2026

Team	Nat	From	To	Record							
Team	Nat	From	To	G	W	D	L	GF	GA	GD	Win %
Unión Española	(Chile)	14 October 2010	18 May 2015	247	111	54	82	410	320	+90	44.94
Colo-Colo	(Chile)	18 May 2015	20 July 2016	49	28	11	10	76	45	+31	57.14
Al-Ittihad	(Saudi Arabia)	22 July 2016	1 June 2018	63	34	14	15	118	91	+27	53.97
Shabab Al Ahli	(United Arab Emirates)	28 May 2018	14 October 2018	7	3	0	4	13	12	+1	42.86
Al-Ittihad	(Saudi Arabia)	24 February 2019	19 October 2019	32	18	5	9	68	45	+23	56.25
Palestino	(Chile)	11 November 2020	16 August 2021	46	19	10	17	74	62	+12	41.30
Al-Tai	(Saudi Arabia)	7 November 2021	7 July 2022	21	9	3	9	27	30	−3	42.86
Al-Wehda	(Saudi Arabia)	21 October 2022	1 June 2023	26	9	8	9	27	36	−9	34.62
Unión Española	(Chile)	4 September 2024	26 May 2025	29	8	4	17	36	46	−10	27.59
Al-Wehda	(Saudi Arabia)	1 September 2025	6 November 2025	8	0	2	6	8	19	−11	0.00
Al-Wakrah	(Qatar)	27 March 2026	present	13	6	5	2	25	17	+8	46.15
Career totals				541	245	116	180	882	723	+159	45.29

== Honours ==
=== Player ===
He played in Chile on the national soccer team for nine years, from 1991 to 2000.

==== Club ====
Colo-Colo

- Primera División de Chile (3): 1996, 1997–C 1998
- Copa Chile (1): 1996

Unión Española

- Copa Chile (3): 1989, 1992, 1993
- Primera División de Chile (1): 2005–A

=== Individual ===
- Chilean Footballer of the Year: 2005

=== Manager ===
==== Club ====
Unión Española

- Primera División de Chile (1): 2013 Transición

Colo-Colo

- Primera División de Chile (1): 2015 Apertura
- Copa Chile: Runner-up 2015

Ittihad FC

- Saudi Crown Prince Cup 2017
- King Cup: 2018

==== Individual ====
- Saudi Professional League Manager of the Month: April 2019
