= Rodrigo Núñez =

Chilean footballer (born 1977)

Personal information
- Full name: Rodrigo Fabián Núñez Ortíz
- Date of birth: 5 February 1977 (age 49)
- Place of birth: Santiago, Chile
- Height: 1.79 m (5 ft 10 in)
- Position: Midfielder

Senior career*
Years	Team	Apps	(Gls)
1999	Cobresal		
2000–2004	Santiago Wanderers		
2005	Rangers		
2006–2008	Cobresal		
2009	Antofagasta		
2010–2011	Deportes Iquique		

International career^{‡}
2000–2001	Chile	6	(0)
- * Club domestic league appearances and goals as of 8 June 2009 ‡ National team caps and goals as of 9 July 2007

Rodrigo Fabián Núñez Ortiz (born 5 February 1977) is a Chilean football former midfielder.

== International career ==
He made his debut for the Chile national football team on 9 February 2000. He obtained a total of six caps for his native country and was a member of the bronze-winning squad at the 2000 Summer Olympics in Sydney, Australia.

== Honours ==
=== Club ===
Santiago Wanderers

- Primera División de Chile (1): 2001

=== International ===
- Olympic Games Bronze Medal: 2000 Sydney
