= Daniel Pérez (footballer, born 1975) =

Argentine-born Chilean footballer

Personal information
- Full name: Daniel Fernando Pérez Reyes
- Date of birth: 19 August 1975 (age 51)
- Place of birth: Trelew, Argentina
- Height: 1.78 m (5 ft 10 in)
- Position: Forward

Senior career*
Years	Team	Apps	(Gls)
1998–2001	C.A.I.	43	(8)
2001–2003	Universidad Católica	93	(13)
2000	→ Everton (loan)	30	(6)
2004–2005	Cobreloa	64	(17)
2006	Universidad de Chile	8	(0)
2006	Palestino	14	(2)
2007	Everton	13	(1)
2007–2008	Guillermo Brown	34	(9)
2008	Deportivo Madryn	29	(5)
2009	Defensores de la Ribera	–	(–)
2010	Jorge Newbery	–	(–)
2011	Grupo Universitario	2	(0)
Total		330	(61)

International career
2003–2005	Chile	2	(0)
- * Club domestic league appearances and goals

Daniel Fernando Pérez Reyes (born 11 August 1975) is a former professional footballer who played as a forward. Born in Argentina, he represented the Chile national team.

== Club career ==
Born in Trelew, Chubut Province, Pérez started his career at hometown club Comisión de Actividades Infantiles in the Argentine third-tier in 1998. He played there two seasons, netting eight goals in 43 appearances.

In January 2000, Pérez successfully joined Chilean powerhouse Universidad Católica after being on trial, but he was immediately loaned to Everton from the top-tier too. In his first full professional season he performed well in Viña del Mar–based club, scoring six goals in 30 league games. Despite it, the season ended with Everton finishing bottom of the league, and being relegated to Primera B.

Once settled in Católica, he helped the team to win their eight league title, after reaching the 2002 Torneo Apertura title with Juvenal Olmos as head coach. On 5 January 2004, he refused a contract extension and then moved to Cobreloa for play the Copa Libertadores. There he helped the team to win the Torneo Apertura.

On 18 January 2006, he joined Católica's rivals Universidad de Chile. After an unsuccessful tournament, he didn't continue with The Lions for economical and sports reasons amid the club's bankruptcy. Then he signed for Palestino from Chilean first-tier too.

In December 2006, it was reported that Pérez returned to Everton — coached by his former manager Juvenal Olmos — for play the 2007 Torneo Apertura. After Olmos resignal, he wasn't considered by new coach Jorge García and was released from the club.

On 28 July 2007, he joined Argentine third-tier club Guillermo Brown. After playing 34 games and scoring nine goals in the 2007–08 season he retired from football.

== Personal life ==
He naturalized Chilean by descent, due to his father being Chilean.

== Honours ==
=== Club ===
Universidad Católica

- Primera División de Chile: 2002 Apertura

Cobreloa

- Primera División de Chile: 2004 Apertura
