= 2003 Campeonato Nacional Primera División =

The 2003 Primera División de Chile season was both 73rd and 74th season of top-flight football in Chile.

== Torneo Apertura ==
Campeonato Nacional Apertura Copa Banco del Estado
- Dates: 8 February – 6 July 2003
- Champions: Cobreloa; 6th title
- 2004 Copa Libertadores: Cobreloa
- 2003 Copa Sudamericana: Universidad Católica (Pre-Sudamericana winners); Provincial Osorno (Pre-Sudamericana winners)
- Matches: 146
- Goals: 489 (3.35 per match)
- Top goalscorer: Salvador Cabañas (18 goals)
- Biggest home win: Universidad de Concepción 8–2 Palestino (20 April)
- Biggest away win: Palestino 1–5 Audax Italiano (15 March)
- Highest attendance: 40,000; Colo-Colo 0–0 Cobreloa (21 December)

The 2003 Campeonato Nacional Apertura Copa Banco del Estado was the 73rd Chilean League top flight tournament, in which Cobreloa won its sixth league title after eight years.

=== Group standings ===
| Pos | Team | Pld | W | D | L | GF | GA | GD | Pts | Qualification |
|---|---|---|---|---|---|---|---|---|---|---|
| 1 | Cobreloa | 15 | 10 | 1 | 4 | 26 | 16 | +10 | 31 | Qualify to the playoffs |
| 2 | Huachipato | 15 | 6 | 3 | 6 | 22 | 22 | 0 | 21 | Qualify to the playoffs |
| 3 | Unión Española | 15 | 5 | 3 | 7 | 24 | 32 | −8 | 18 | Qualify to the playoffs |
| 4 | Palestino | 15 | 5 | 2 | 8 | 18 | 28 | −10 | 17 | |

=== Group B ===
| Pos | Team | Pld | W | D | L | GF | GA | GD | Pts | Qualification |
|---|---|---|---|---|---|---|---|---|---|---|
| 1 | Deportes Puerto Montt | 15 | 7 | 4 | 4 | 26 | 22 | +4 | 25 | Qualify to the playoffs |
| 2 | Universidad de Chile | 15 | 4 | 8 | 3 | 30 | 24 | +6 | 20 | Qualify to the playoffs |
| 3 | Unión San Felipe | 15 | 3 | 4 | 8 | 13 | 26 | −13 | 13 | Qualify to the repechaje |
| 4 | Coquimbo Unido | 15 | 2 | 2 | 11 | 12 | 30 | −18 | 8 | |

=== Group C ===
| Pos | Team | Pld | W | D | L | GF | GA | GD | Pts | Qualification |
|---|---|---|---|---|---|---|---|---|---|---|
| 1 | Audax Italiano | 15 | 8 | 2 | 5 | 37 | 30 | +7 | 26 | Qualify to the playoffs |
| 2 | Cobresal | 15 | 6 | 3 | 6 | 27 | 19 | +8 | 21 | Qualify to the playoffs |
| 3 | Rangers | 15 | 3 | 11 | 1 | 28 | 26 | +2 | 20 | Qualify to the playoffs |
| 4 | Santiago Wanderers | 15 | 5 | 4 | 6 | 24 | 23 | +1 | 19 | Qualify to the repechaje |

=== Group D ===
| Pos | Team | Pld | W | D | L | GF | GA | GD | Pts | Qualification |
|---|---|---|---|---|---|---|---|---|---|---|
| 1 | Universidad de Concepción | 15 | 7 | 3 | 5 | 29 | 21 | +8 | 24 | Qualify to the playoffs |
| 2 | Universidad Católica | 15 | 6 | 6 | 3 | 27 | 20 | +7 | 24 | Qualify to the playoffs |
| 3 | Colo-Colo | 15 | 6 | 5 | 4 | 28 | 23 | +5 | 23 | Qualify to the playoffs |
| 4 | Deportes Temuco | 15 | 5 | 3 | 7 | 24 | 33 | −9 | 18 | |

=== Results ===
| | AUD | CLO | CSA | COL | COQ | HUA | PAL | DPM | RAN | USF | DTE | UCA | UCH | UCO | UES | SWA |
|---|---|---|---|---|---|---|---|---|---|---|---|---|---|---|---|---|
| Audax | | 3–2 | 2–1 | | | 1–2 | | 3–4 | 4–4 | | | 2–1 | | 2–1 | | |
| Cobreloa | | | 2–1 | | 1–0 | 2–1 | 1–0 | 2–0 | | 3–0 | | | 4–1 | | 2–1 | |
| Cobresal | | | | 1–0 | 4–0 | | 1–0 | | | | 5–0 | | 3–3 | | 5–1 | 1–2 |
| Colo-Colo | 6–4 | 0–2 | | | | 2–1 | | 1–1 | 1–1 | 4–2 | | 1–1 | | 1–1 | | |
| Coquimbo | 1–0 | | | 0–4 | | | | | 1–1 | 2–1 | 1–2 | 1–3 | | 0–1 | | 0–2 |
| Huachipato | | | 1–0 | | 3–1 | | 4–2 | | | 1–0 | 2–3 | | 2–2 | | 1–2 | 1–0 |
| Palestino | 1–5 | | | 0–2 | 1–0 | | | | | | 4–0 | 2–2 | 1–0 | | | 1–1 |
| Puerto Montt | | | 3–0 | | 1–1 | 3–0 | 1–0 | | | 1–2 | | | 1–1 | | 2–3 | 2–1 |
| Rangers | | 1–1 | 3–3 | | | 1–1 | 2–1 | 4–0 | | | | | 2–2 | | 2–2 | |
| San Felipe | 0–4 | | 1–0 | | | | 0–1 | | 1–1 | | | 1–3 | 0–0 | 2–0 | 2–2 | |
| Temuco | | 2–3 | 3–1 | | 5–1 | | | 2–3 | 1–1 | 3–0 | | 1–1 | | 0–1 | | |
| U. Católica | | 3–1 | 0–0 | | | 3–2 | | 1–1 | 1–3 | | | | | 0–0 | 4–2 | |
| U. Chile | 1–1 | | | 0–0 | 4–3 | | | | | | 6–0 | 3–2 | | 2–3 | | 4–1 |
| U. Concepción | | 2–1 | 1–2 | | | 0–0 | 8–2 | 1–3 | 5–0 | | | | | | 3–1 | |
| U. Española | 1–3 | | | 0–2 | 2–1 | | 1–2 | | | | 3–1 | | 1–1 | | | 2–1 |
| S. Wanderers | 3–1 | 0–1 | | 4–3 | | | | | 2–2 | 1–1 | 1–1 | 0–2 | | 5–2 | | |

=== Aggregate table ===
| Pos | Team | Pld | W | D | L | GF | GA | GD | Pts | Qualification |
|---|---|---|---|---|---|---|---|---|---|---|
| 1 | Cobreloa | 15 | 10 | 1 | 4 | 26 | 16 | +10 | 31 | Playoffs |
| 2 | Audax Italiano | 15 | 8 | 2 | 5 | 37 | 30 | +7 | 26 | Playoffs |
| 3 | Deportes Puerto Montt | 15 | 7 | 4 | 4 | 26 | 22 | +4 | 25 | Playoffs |
| 4 | Universidad de Concepción | 15 | 7 | 3 | 5 | 29 | 21 | +8 | 24 | Playoffs |
| 5 | Universidad Católica | 15 | 6 | 6 | 3 | 27 | 20 | +7 | 24 | Playoffs |
| 6 | Colo-Colo | 15 | 6 | 5 | 4 | 28 | 23 | +5 | 23 | Playoffs |
| 7 | Cobresal | 15 | 6 | 3 | 6 | 27 | 19 | +8 | 21 | Playoffs |
| 8 | Huachipato | 15 | 6 | 3 | 6 | 22 | 22 | 0 | 21 | Playoffs |
| 9 | Universidad de Chile | 15 | 4 | 8 | 3 | 30 | 24 | +6 | 20 | Playoffs |
| 10 | Rangers | 15 | 3 | 11 | 1 | 28 | 26 | +2 | 20 | Playoffs |
| 11 | Santiago Wanderers | 15 | 5 | 4 | 6 | 24 | 23 | +1 | 19 | Repechaje |
| 12 | Unión Española | 15 | 5 | 3 | 7 | 24 | 32 | −8 | 18 | Playoffs |
| 13 | Palestino | 15 | 5 | 2 | 8 | 18 | 28 | −10 | 17 | |
| 14 | Deportes Temuco | 15 | 5 | 3 | 7 | 24 | 33 | −9 | 18 | |
| 15 | Unión San Felipe | 15 | 3 | 4 | 8 | 13 | 26 | −13 | 13 | Repechaje |
| 16 | Coquimbo Unido | 15 | 2 | 2 | 11 | 12 | 30 | −18 | 8 | |

=== Repechaje ===
Santiago Wanderers qualify to playoffs as best placed team despite having drawn with Unión San Felipe.

| Match | Home | Visitor | Result |
|---|---|---|---|
| 1 | Unión San Felipe | Santiago Wanderers | 2–2 |

=== Playoffs ===
==== First round ====
Colo-Colo and Huachipato qualified as best losers.

| Match | Home | Visitor | 1st Leg | 2nd Leg | Aggregate |
|---|---|---|---|---|---|
| 1 | Cobresal | Colo-Colo | 3–0 | 1–2 | 4–2 |
| 2 | Cobreloa | Unión Española | 3–3 | 3–2 | 6–5 |
| 3 | Universidad de Concepción | Universidad de Chile | 0–0 | 4–3 | 4–3 |
| 4 | Universidad Católica | Huachipato | 2–1 | 1–1 | 3–2 |
| 5 | Deportes Puerto Montt | Rangers | 1–2 | 3–0 | 4–2 |
| 6 | Santiago Wanderers | Audax Italiano | 0–0 | 3–0 | 3–0 |

==== Knockout stage ====
Quarterfinals
1 | Cobreloa | 3 | 4 | 7
11 | S. Wanderers | 1 | 2 | 3
3 | Deportes Puerto Montt | 0 | 2 | 2
8 | Huachipato | 2 | 3 | 5
4 | U. de Concepción | 1 | 7 | 8
7 | Cobresal | 2 | 1 | 3
5 | Universidad Católica | 3 | 0 | 3
6 | Colo-Colo | 2 | 1 | 3

Semifinals
1 | Cobreloa | 1 | 2 | 3
8 | Huachipato | 2 | 0 | 2
4 | U. de Concepción | 0 | 2 | 2
6 | Colo-Colo | 3 | 3 | 6

Finals
1 | Cobreloa | 0 | 4 | 4
6 | Colo-Colo | 0 | 0 | 0

==== Finals ====
3 July 2003
18:10 (UTC-4)
1st Leg

| Colo-Colo | 0–0 | Cobreloa |
|---|---|---|
| | Report |

Estadio Monumental, Santiago
Attendance: 40,000
Referee: Rubén Selman

6 July 2003
17:10 (UTC-4)
2nd Leg

| Cobreloa | 4–0 | Colo-Colo |
|---|---|---|
| Fuentes 28'; Díaz 67'; Galaz 72', 87' | Report | Riffo (red card) 74'; Zamorano (red card) 74'; Villaseca (red card) 74' |

Estadio Municipal de Calama, Calama
Attendance: 10,776
Referee: Carlos Chandía

2003 Apertura winners
Cobreloa
6th title

=== Top goalscorers ===
| Rank | Player | Club | Goals |
|---|---|---|---|
| 1 | (Paraguay) Salvador Cabañas | Audax Italiano | 18 |
| 2 | (Chile) Juan Quiroga | Cobresal | 12 |
| 3 | (Argentina) José Luis Díaz | Cobreloa | 11 |
| 3 | (Chile) Patricio Galaz | Cobreloa | 11 |
| 3 | (Chile) Marcelo Corrales | Puerto Montt | 11 |
| 3 | (Chile) Joel Soto | Santiago Wanderers | 11 |

== Pre-Copa Sudamericana 2003 Tournament ==
All sixteen first level teams took part in this tournament, plus -and only for this edition-, all sixteen second level teams took part as well. One of the qualified teams to the Copa Sudamericana coming from this division, Provincial Osorno.

=== First round ===
Played on July 9 & 10, 2003

| Home team | Score | Away team |
|---|---|---|
| Deportes Arica | 1–5 | Universidad de Chile |
| Deportes Antofagasta | 3–0 | Cobreloa |
| Deportes Copiapó | 1–0 | Cobresal |
| Deportes La Serena | 2–2 (2-4p) | Coquimbo Unido |
| Unión La Calera | 0–2 | Universidad Católica |
| Everton | 2–0 | Santiago Wanderers |
| Deportes Melipilla | 1–0 | Unión San Felipe |
| O'Higgins | 5–2 | Audax Italiano |
| Fernandez Vial | 1–0 | Universidad de Concepción |
| Lota Schwager | 0–2 | Huachipato |
| Deportes Talcahuano | 0–1 | Deportes Temuco |
| Provincial Osorno | 1–0 | Deportes Puerto Montt |
| Deportes Ovalle | 4–3 aet | Colo-Colo |
| Santiago Morning | 2–3 | Palestino |
| Magallanes | 5–2 | Unión Española |
| Rangers | 3–0 | Deportes Concepción |

=== Second round ===
Played on July 13, 2003

| Home team | Score | Away team |
|---|---|---|
| Deportes Antofagasta | 2–1 aet | Universidad de Chile |
| Coquimbo Unido | 2–1 | Deportes Copiapó |
| Universidad Católica | 0–0 (5-4p) | Deportes Ovalle |
| Everton | 4–0 | Deportes Melipilla |
| Magallanes | 2–3 | Palestino |
| O'Higgins | 2–1 aet | Rangers |
| Huachipato | 2–1 | Fernandez Vial |
| Provincial Osorno | 1–0 | Deportes Temuco |

=== Third round ===
Played on July 16 & 17, 2003

| Home team | Score | Away team |
|---|---|---|
| Everton | 2–2 (2-3p) | Universidad Católica |
| Deportes Antofagasta | 4–2 | Coquimbo Unido |
| O'Higgins | 1–3 | Palestino |
| Provincial Osorno | 2–1 | Huachipato |

=== Final round ===
| 20 July 2003 | Universidad Católica | 2 – 0 | Deportes Antofagasta | San Carlos de Apoquindo, Santiago |
| | Gioino 44'; Rozental 90' | | | Attendance: 3,529; Referee: C. Chandía |

| 20 July 2003 | Provincial Osorno | 2 – 1 | Palestino | Parque Schott, Osorno |
| | Naif 25', 43' | | 46' Estay | Attendance: 8,000; Referee: P. Pozo |

Universidad Católica & Provincial Osorno qualified to 2003 Copa Sudamericana

== Torneo Clausura ==
Campeonato Nacional Clausura Copa Banco del Estado
- Dates: 8 February – 6 July 2003
- Champions: Cobreloa; 7th title
- 2004 Copa Libertadores: Colo-Colo (Apertura/Clausura 2nd place); Universidad de Concepción (Best team not yet qualified)
- Matches: 181
- Goals: 509 (2.81 per match)
- Top goalscorer: Gustavo Biscayzacú (21 goals)
- Biggest home win: Palestino 6–2 Rangers (18 October)
- Biggest away win: Universidad Católica 2–5 Colo-Colo (10 August); Rangers 0–6 Universidad de Concepción (26 October)
- Highest attendance: 40,000; Colo-Colo 1–2 Cobreloa (21 December)

The 2003 Campeonato Nacional Clausura Copa Banco del Estado was the 74th Chilean League top flight tournament, in which Cobreloa won its seventh league title after beating Colo-Colo in the finals.

=== Group A ===
| Pos | Team | Pld | W | D | L | GF | GA | GD | Pts | Qualification |
|---|---|---|---|---|---|---|---|---|---|---|
| 1 | Universidad de Chile | 15 | 7 | 2 | 6 | 28 | 21 | +7 | 23 | Qualify to the playoffs |
| 2 | Cobreloa | 15 | 6 | 4 | 5 | 30 | 24 | +6 | 22 | Qualify to the playoffs |
| 3 | Huachipato | 15 | 6 | 2 | 7 | 30 | 33 | −3 | 20 | Qualify to the playoffs |
| 4 | Deportes Temuco | 15 | 3 | 1 | 11 | 18 | 38 | −20 | 10 | |

=== Group B ===
| Pos | Team | Pld | W | D | L | GF | GA | GD | Pts | Qualification |
|---|---|---|---|---|---|---|---|---|---|---|
| 1 | Colo-Colo | 15 | 9 | 5 | 1 | 39 | 19 | +20 | 32 | Qualify to the playoffs |
| 2 | Santiago Wanderers | 15 | 7 | 6 | 2 | 27 | 22 | +5 | 27 | Qualify to the playoffs |
| 3 | Palestino | 15 | 8 | 2 | 5 | 35 | 28 | +7 | 26 | Qualify to the playoffs |
| 4 | Audax Italiano | 15 | 5 | 2 | 8 | 15 | 22 | −7 | 17 | Qualify to the re-qualifier |

=== Group C ===
| Pos | Team | Pld | W | D | L | GF | GA | GD | Pts | Qualification |
|---|---|---|---|---|---|---|---|---|---|---|
| 1 | Unión Española | 15 | 9 | 4 | 2 | 36 | 22 | +14 | 31 | Qualify to the playoffs |
| 2 | Universidad Católica | 15 | 6 | 2 | 7 | 22 | 24 | −2 | 20 | Qualify to the playoffs |
| 3 | Deportes Puerto Montt | 15 | 5 | 0 | 10 | 23 | 34 | −11 | 15 | Qualify to the re-qualifier |
| 4 | Coquimbo Unido | 15 | 2 | 3 | 10 | 15 | 27 | −12 | 9 | |

=== Group D ===
| Pos | Team | Pld | W | D | L | GF | GA | GD | Pts | Qualification |
|---|---|---|---|---|---|---|---|---|---|---|
| 1 | Universidad de Concepción | 15 | 9 | 5 | 1 | 35 | 15 | +20 | 32 | Qualify to the playoffs |
| 2 | Cobresal | 15 | 6 | 4 | 5 | 29 | 26 | +3 | 22 | Qualify to the playoffs |
| 3 | Rangers | 15 | 6 | 1 | 8 | 20 | 38 | −18 | 19 | Qualify to the playoffs |
| 4 | Unión San Felipe | 15 | 2 | 3 | 10 | 22 | 33 | −11 | 9 | |

=== Results ===
| | AUD | CLO | CSA | COL | COQ | HUA | PAL | DPM | RAN | USF | DTE | UCA | UCH | UCO | UES | SWA |
|---|---|---|---|---|---|---|---|---|---|---|---|---|---|---|---|---|
| Audax | | | | 1–3 | 2–1 | | 1–3 | | | 1–1 | 1–0 | | 0–3 | | 3–2 | 0–0 |
| Cobreloa | 2–1 | | | 1–2 | | | | | 4–0 | | 4–2 | 3–0 | | 2–0 | | 3–1 |
| Cobresal | 2–0 | 3–3 | | | | 4–2 | | 5–1 | 5–2 | 2–0 | | 1–1 | | 3–4 | | |
| Colo-Colo | | | 4–1 | | 4–1 | | 2–1 | | | | 4–0 | | 1–1 | | 3–3 | 3–0 |
| Coquimbo | | 1–1 | 0–0 | | | 1–2 | 0–2 | 1–3 | | | | | 2–3 | | 2–1 | |
| Huachipato | 2–1 | 2–2 | | 3–3 | | | | 2–1 | 1–3 | | | 1–3 | | 1–2 | | |
| Palestino | | 2–2 | 1–0 | | | 3–5 | | 2–1 | 6–2 | 4–2 | | | | 2–2 | 1–2 | |
| Puerto Montt | 0–3 | 2–1 | | 1–2 | | | | | 2–0 | | 5–1 | 0–2 | | 0–4 | | |
| Rangers | 0–1 | | | 2–1 | 2–1 | | | | | 3–1 | 3–2 | 1–0 | | 0–6 | | 1–1 |
| San Felipe | | 4–1 | | 1–1 | 1–2 | 2–4 | | 2–3 | | | 3–1 | | | | | 1–1 |
| Temuco | | | 0–1 | | 2–1 | 2–1 | 2–3 | | | | | | 2–1 | | 1–2 | 2–2 |
| U. Católica | 2–0 | | | 2–5 | 1–1 | | 3–1 | | | 1–2 | 3–0 | | 2–1 | | | 2–4 |
| U. Chile | | 1–0 | 4–0 | | | 1–2 | 0–2 | 3–1 | 3–0 | 3–1 | | | | | 1–4 | |
| U. Concepción | 1–0 | | | 1–1 | 1–0 | | | | | 2–0 | 4–1 | 3–0 | 2–2 | | | 1–1 |
| U. Española | | 3–1 | 1–1 | | | 4–2 | | 3–1 | 2–1 | 4–1 | | 1–0 | | 2–2 | | |
| S. Wanderers | | | 3–1 | | 2–1 | 1–0 | 4–2 | 3–2 | | | | | 2–1 | | 2–2 | |

=== Aggregate table ===
| Pos | Team | Pld | W | D | L | GF | GA | GD | Pts | Qualification |
|---|---|---|---|---|---|---|---|---|---|---|
| 1 | Colo-Colo | 15 | 9 | 5 | 1 | 39 | 19 | +20 | 32 | Playoffs |
| 2 | Universidad de Concepción | 15 | 9 | 5 | 1 | 35 | 15 | +20 | 32 | Playoffs |
| 3 | Unión Española | 18 | 9 | 4 | 5 | 36 | 22 | +14 | 31 | Playoffs |
| 4 | Santiago Wanderers | 15 | 7 | 6 | 2 | 27 | 22 | +5 | 27 | Playoffs |
| 5 | Palestino | 15 | 8 | 2 | 5 | 35 | 28 | +7 | 26 | Playoffs |
| 6 | Universidad de Chile | 15 | 7 | 2 | 6 | 28 | 21 | +7 | 23 | Playoffs |
| 7 | Cobreloa | 15 | 6 | 4 | 5 | 30 | 24 | +6 | 22 | Playoffs |
| 8 | Cobresal | 15 | 6 | 4 | 5 | 29 | 26 | +3 | 22 | Playoffs |
| 9 | Universidad Católica | 15 | 6 | 2 | 7 | 22 | 24 | −2 | 20 | Playoffs |
| 10 | Huachipato | 15 | 6 | 2 | 7 | 30 | 33 | −3 | 20 | Playoffs |
| 11 | Rangers | 15 | 6 | 1 | 8 | 20 | 38 | −18 | 19 | Playoffs |
| 12 | Audax Italiano | 15 | 5 | 2 | 8 | 15 | 22 | −7 | 17 | Repechaje |
| 13 | Deportes Puerto Montt | 15 | 5 | 0 | 10 | 23 | 34 | −11 | 15 | Repechaje |
| 14 | Deportes Temuco | 15 | 3 | 1 | 11 | 18 | 38 | −20 | 10 | |
| 15 | Unión San Felipe | 15 | 2 | 3 | 10 | 22 | 33 | −11 | 9 | |
| 16 | Coquimbo Unido | 15 | 2 | 3 | 10 | 15 | 27 | −12 | 9 | |

=== Re-qualifier ===
| Match | Home | Visitor | Result |
|---|---|---|---|
| 1 | Deportes Puerto Montt | Audax Italiano | 1–1 |

- Audax Italiano qualify to playoffs as best placed team despite having drawn with Deportes Puerto Montt

=== Playoffs ===
==== First round ====
Santiago Wanderers and Palestino qualified as best losers.

| Match | Home | Visitor | 1st Leg | 2nd Leg | Aggregate |
|---|---|---|---|---|---|
| 1 | Universidad de Concepción | Rangers | 2–2 | 3–1 | 5–3 |
| 2 | Cobreloa | Universidad de Chile | 3–2 | 3–1 | 6–3 |
| 3 | Colo-Colo | Audax Italiano | 1–1 | 4–0 | 5–1 |
| 4 | Unión Española | Huachipato | 2–1 | 3–2 | 5–3 |
| 5 | Universidad Católica | Santiago Wanderers | 4–1 | 1–2 | 5–3 |
| 6 | Cobresal | Palestino | 0–0 | 2–1 | 2–1 |

==== Knockout stage ====
Quarterfinals
3 | Unión Española | 1 | 2 | 3
7 | Cobreloa | 4 | 4 | 8
4 | Santiago Wanderers (p) | 1 | 1 | 2
5 | Palestino | 1 | 1 | 2
1 | Colo-Colo | 2 | 0 | 2
9 | Universidad Católica | 1 | 0 | 1
2 | Universidad de Concepción | 1 | 5 | 6
8 | Cobresal | 2 | 2 | 4

Semifinals
7 | Cobreloa | 2 | 0 | 2
4 | Santiago Wanderers | 0 | 0 | 0
1 | Colo-Colo | 1 | 2 | 3
8 | Cobresal | 1 | 0 | 1

Finals
1 | Colo-Colo | 2 | 1 | 3
7 | Cobreloa | 2 | 2 | 4

==== Finals ====
17 December 2003
1st Leg

| Cobreloa | 2–2 | Colo-Colo |
|---|---|---|
| González 52'; Cornejo 80' (pen.) | Report | Espina 75'; Henríquez 90' |

Estadio Municipal de Calama, Calama
Attendance: 7,633
Referee: Carlos Chandía

21 December 2003
2nd Leg

| Colo-Colo | 1–2 | Cobreloa |
|---|---|---|
| Fernández 81'; Henríquez (yellow card) 86' (red card) | Report | Fuentes 41'; González 70' |

Estadio Monumental, Santiago
Attendance: 40,000
Referee: Rubén Selman

2003 Clausura winners
Cobreloa
7th title

=== Top goalscorers ===
| Rank | Player | Club | Goals |
|---|---|---|---|
| 1 | (Uruguay) Gustavo Biscayzacú | Unión Española | 21 |
| 2 | (Chile) José Luis Villanueva | Palestino | 14 |
| 3 | (Chile) Manuel Neira | Colo-Colo | 13 |
| 3 | (Chile) Juan Quiroga | Cobresal | 13 |
| 4 | (Chile) Héctor Mancilla | Huachipato | 11 |
| 4 | (Argentina) Diego Rivarola | Universidad de Chile | 11 |
| 4 | (Chile) Joel Estay | Palestino | 11 |
