= Juan Muñoz Bejarano =

Spanish military officer and politician

Procurador General of Buenos Aires
- In office 1662–1663
- Monarch: Philip IV of Spain

Personal details
- Born: 1610 Buenos Aires, Viceroyalty of Peru
- Died: c.1670 Buenos Aires, Viceroyalty of Peru
- Spouse: Catalina Rocha Lobo
- Occupation: Government
- Profession: Army

Military service
- Allegiance: Spain
- Branch/service: Spanish Army
- Years of service: 1630-c.1670
- Rank: Captain
- Unit: Fuerte de Buenos Aires

Juan Muñoz Bejarano (1610-1670s) was a Spanish military officer and politician, who served during the Viceroyalty of Peru as Alcalde, Regidor and Procurador General of Buenos Aires.

== Biography ==
Born in Buenos Aires, was the son of Alonso Muñoz Bejarano and María López Palomo, a Spanish family from Trujillo, Peru. He was married to Catalina Rocha, born in the city, daughter of Antonio de Rocha Lobo Sarmiento, a Portuguese settler born in Viana, and Maria de Encinas Roxas, belonging to a Creole family of Portuguese origin.

He held the honorary positions of Captain of Infantry, attorney general and faithful executor of the Buenos Aires Cabildo. He exercised during three periods the position of alcalde de la hermandad. In 1664, he held the position of interim mayor of Buenos Aires, replacing Juan del Pozo y Silva.

On August 29, 1635, Juan Muñoz received land grants in the town of Magdalena, and was encomendero of the Chanas and Tubichamim tribes.
