= Luis Fuentes (footballer, born 1971) =

Chilean footballer

Personal information
- Full name: Luis Alberto Fuentes Rodríguez
- Date of birth: 14 August 1971 (age 55)
- Place of birth: Petorca, Chile
- Height: 1.81 m (5 ft 11 1/2 in)
- Position: Centre back

Youth career
- Coquimbo Unido

Senior career*
Years	Team	Apps	(Gls)
1993–1998	Coquimbo Unido	156	(12)
1999–2008	Cobreloa	295	(18)
2009	Coquimbo Unido	34	(1)
2010–2011	Deportes Iquique	68	(2)
2012–2014	Coquimbo Unido	77	(2)
Total		630	(35)

International career
1998–2005	Chile	27	(4)
1998	Chile B	1	(0)

Managerial career
- 2015–2020: Coquimbo Unido (youth)
- 2020–2023: Cobreloa (youth)
- 2021: Cobreloa (women)
- 2026–: Provincial Ovalle (assistant)
- * Club domestic league appearances and goals

Luis Alberto Fuentes Rodríguez (born 14 August 1971) is a Chilean former footballer that played as centre back in his years active. His last club was Coquimbo Unido.

== Club career ==
Fuentes was trained at Coquimbo Unido, becoming a historical player for them and later Cobreloa.

== International career ==
Fuentes made 24 appearances for Chile from 1998 to 2005. In addition, he played for Chile B against England B on 10 February 1998. Chile won by 2-1.

As a curiosity, he popularized a striking play what was called Culebra (Snake) due to the fact he threw himself to the ground to block Ronaldo in the 2006 FIFA World Cup qualification match against Brazil on 6 June 2004.

== Managerial career ==
While he was a player of Coquimbo Unido, he studied at the INAF (National Football Institute) and graduated as a football manager in 2014.

He has coached the youth teams of both Coquimbo Unido and Cobreloa. In April 2021, he also was confirmed as the coach of Cobreloa women's team. In November 2023, he left Cobreloa.

Following Cobreloa, Fuentes settled in the Coquimbo Region and has served as coach for Academia Caleta Hornos.

On 4 February 2026, Fuentes joined the technical staff of Jonathan Orellana in Provincial Ovalle as assistant coach.

== Honours ==
=== Player ===
Cobreloa

- Primera División de Chile (3): 2003 Apertura, 2003 Clausura, 2004 Clausura

Deportes Iquique

- Primera B (1): 2010
- Copa Chile (1): 2010

Individual

- Chilean Footballer of the Year (1): 2004
