= Nelson Pinto =

Chilean footballer (born 1981)

Personal information
- Full name: Nelson Alejandro Pinto Martínez
- Date of birth: 1 February 1981 (age 45)
- Place of birth: Santiago, Chile
- Height: 1.83 m (6 ft 0 in)
- Position: Midfielder

Youth career
- Universidad de Chile

Senior career*
| Years | Team | Apps | (Gls) |
| 2001–2005 | Universidad de Chile | 110 | (8) |
| 2005–2011 | Tecos UAG | 114 | (7) |
| 2008 | → Universidad de Chile (loan) | 17 | (5) |
| 2009–2010 | → Universidad de Chile (loan) | 40 | (1) |
| 2011 | → Santiago Morning (loan) | 16 | (0) |
| 2012 | Palestino | 8 | (0) |
| Total | | 305 | (21) |

International career
| 2001 | Chile U20 | 3 | (0) |
| 2017–2021 | Chile (minifootball) | | |
- * Club domestic league appearances and goals

Nelson Alejandro Pinto Martínez (born 1 February 1981) is a Chilean former professional footballer who played as a midfielder.

He is best known for his spells with Universidad de Chile and Mexican club Tecos UAG, while also representing Santiago Morning and Palestino in Chile. Similarly, Pinto made 110 caps with the Chilean squad and scored eight goals before making the move to Mexico before the clasura tournament 2005.

Pinto played for Chile at the 2001 FIFA World Youth Championship in Argentina.

== Club career ==
=== Universidad de Chile ===
Pinto was developed in the youth system of Universidad de Chile and established himself in the first team during the early 2000s. One of the most notable incidents of his first spell occurred during the Superclásico against Colo-Colo at the Estadio Monumental in August 2003, when he was struck in the face by an object thrown from the stands. The incident led to the suspension of the match.

In 2004, Pinto was a regular member of the Universidad de Chile side that won the Apertura championship. He started both matches of the final against Cobreloa and converted one of Universidad de Chile's penalties in the deciding shoot-out in Calama, which the club won 4–2 after a 1–1 draw.

Pinto remained with Universidad de Chile during the first half of 2005 and also appeared in the 2005 Copa Libertadores, in which the club reached the round of 16. In April, he scored Universidad de Chile's goal in a 1–1 Superclásico draw against Colo-Colo.

=== Tecos UAG and late career ===
In June 2005, Pinto moved abroad after signing for Mexican club Tecos UAG. He made his Mexican league debut against San Luis in July, and scored his first goal in Mexico the following week in a 2–2 draw with Veracruz. He subsequently became a regular for Tecos and helped the club reach the Apertura 2005 playoffs, providing an assist in the decisive 3–2 victory over Necaxa.

Pinto remained in Mexico for several seasons. In the 2007 Apertura, he received a three-match suspension following his dismissal against Atlante. Contemporary reports noted that it was his second red card since joining Mexican football in 2005.

In 2008, Pinto returned on loan to Universidad de Chile. He enjoyed a productive Clausura campaign, scoring five goals in his first 12 appearances as the team challenged for first place in the regular season. Among them was the opening goal in a 3–0 victory over Santiago Morning, which moved Universidad de Chile into sole possession of the league lead.

After returning to Tecos, Pinto later began another loan spell with Universidad de Chile, remaining with the club through 2010. At the end of that season he left the Santiago side and joined Santiago Morning for 2011. He made 16 appearances for Santiago Morning during the Apertura.

Pinto returned to Tecos in mid-2011 and featured regularly during the Mexican Apertura, including playing the full match in a 2–1 away victory over Club América.

In February 2012, Pinto returned to Chile and signed for Palestino. He made eight league appearances for the club, before ending his professional football career later that year.

== Post-retirement ==
After his retirement Pinto played for the amateur club Unión Veterana and since 2017 has played for the Chile national minifootball team alongside others former footballers such as Pablo Duque and Juan Carlos Muñoz, winning the 2018 PAN AM Cup in Guatemala and taking part at the 2017 World Cup and at the 2018 Confederations Cup in Tunisia. In addition to this, he has played futsal for Universidad de Chile, winning the 2017 tournament.

== Honours ==
Universidad de Chile

- Primera División de Chile: 2004 Apertura

Universidad de Chile (futsal)

- Campeonato Nacional: 2017

Chile (minifootball)

- PAN AM Cup: 2018
