= Patricio Galaz =

Chilean footballer (born 1976)

Personal information
- Full name: Patricio Sebastián Galaz Sepúlveda
- Date of birth: 31 December 1976 (age 49)
- Place of birth: Santiago, Chile
- Height: 1.76 m (5 ft 9 1/2 in)
- Position: Striker

Youth career
- Universidad Católica

Senior career*
Years	Team	Apps	(Gls)
1995-1997	Universidad Católica	8	(4)
1996	→ Regional Atacama (loan)	6	(2)
1997	→ Deportes Antofagasta (loan)	5	(2)
1998	→ Coquimbo Unido (loan)	20	(5)
1999–2000	Palestino	57	(16)
2001–2004	Cobreloa	147	(72)
2005–2006	Atlante	53	(23)
2005	→ Universidad de Chile (loan)	0	(0)
2007	Universidad de Chile	25	(7)
2008	Ñublense	9	(3)
2010	Cobreloa	16	(4)
Total		346	(138)

International career
1993	Chile U17	4	(0)
2004–2006	Chile	12	(0)
- * Club domestic league appearances and goals

Patricio Sebastián Galaz Sepúlveda (born 31 December 1976) is a former Chilean footballer who played as a striker.

== Club career ==
He was born in Santiago, Chile and his main position on the team was that of a centre-forward. He previously played club football for Cobreloa in Chile, where he spent four years (2001–2004). He then spent the next two seasons with Mexican club Atlante F.C. He was known there as Patricio "El Pato" (The Duck) Galaz. He played there for 4 years also (1997–2000). In 2008, he was signed by Ñublense.

== International career ==
At international level, Galaz played for Chile at youth level at the 1993 FIFA U-17 World Championship in Japan. At senior level, he represented his nation on 12 occasions between 2004 and 2006, and took part at the 2004 Copa América.

== Personal life ==
Galaz married the Argentine model Gisela Molinero in 2012, who has worked in Chilean TV media.

== Post-retirement ==
Galaz graduated as a football manager in Argentina and served as sporting director of Cobreloa in 2021.

Settled in Argentina, Galaz switched to real estate sector.

Galaz plays footgolf.

== Honours ==
Universidad Católica

- Chilean Primera División (1): 1997 Apertura
- Copa Chile (1): 1995

Cobreloa

- Chilean Primera División (3): 2003 Apertura, 2003 Clausura, 2004 Clausura

International

- FIFA U-17 World Cup Third place: 1993

=== Individual ===
- Chilean Primera División Top Goalscorer: 2004 Apertura, 2004 Clausura
- IFFHS World's Best Top Division Goal Scorer: 2004
