= Juan Carlos Muñoz (footballer, born 1978) =

Chilean footballer

Juan Carlos Muñoz Martínez (born 4 April 1978 in Santiago) is a Chilean former footballer who played as a defender.

== Teams ==
- (Chile) Unión San Felipe 1998–1999
- (Chile) Colo-Colo 2000
- (Chile) San Marcos 2001
- (Chile) Unión Española 2002
- (Chile) Santiago Morning 2003–2007
- (Chile) Curicó Unido 2008–2012

== International ==
Since 2017, Muñoz has played for the Chile national minifootball team alongside others former footballers such as Pablo Duque and Nelson Pinto,

== Honours ==
(Chile) Santiago Morning

- Primera B de Chile: 2005

(Chile) Curicó Unido

- Primera B de Chile: 2008
