= Juan Carlos Muñoz Márquez =

Mexican politician

- Born: 30 April 1950 (age 76); León, Guanajuato, Mexico
- Occupation: Deputy
- Political party: PAN

Juan Carlos Muñoz Márquez (born 30 April 1950) is a Mexican politician affiliated with the PAN. As of 2013 he served as Deputy of the LXII Legislature of the Mexican Congress representing Guanajuato.
