= Sergio Gioino =

Argentine footballer

Personal information
- Full name: Sergio Alejandro Gioino Ponce
- Date of birth: 27 March 1974 (age 52)
- Place of birth: Buenos Aires, Argentina
- Height: 1.85 m (6 ft 1 in)
- Position: Forward

Youth career
- Atlético San Jorge
- Newell's Old Boys

Senior career*
Years	Team	Apps	(Gls)
1996	Atlético San Jorge	–	(–)
1997	Provincial Osorno	29	(12)
1998	Coquimbo Unido	18	(4)
1999	Deportes Iquique	34	(13)
2000–2002	Huachipato	81	(45)
2003	Universidad Católica	27	(10)
2004–2005	Universidad de Chile	44	(31)
2005–2006	Palmeiras	31	(7)
2006	Universidad de Chile	17	(2)
2007	Unión Española	19	(2)
2008	Gama	5	(0)
2009	Coquimbo Unido	0	(0)
Total		305	(126)
- * Club domestic league appearances and goals

Sergio Alejandro Gioino Ponce (born 27 March 1974) is an Argentine-born Chilean former professional footballer who played as a forward.

He spent most of his career in Chile, notably representing Huachipato, Universidad Católica and Universidad de Chile, and also played in Brazil for Palmeiras and Gama.

Following his career, Gioino developed a career as a football agent. In June 2022, he assumed as president of Ñublense.

== Club career ==
Gioino began his career in Argentina with Atlético San Jorge and had spells in the youth system of Newell's Old Boys before moving to Chile. He made his professional debut with Provincial Osorno in 1997 and subsequently played for Coquimbo Unido and Deportes Iquique.

In 2000, Gioino joined Huachipato, where he established himself as a prolific goalscorer. He scored 16 league goals during the 2001 season, finishing among the leading scorers in the Chilean Primera División, and remained with the Talcahuano club until 2002.

Gioino signed for Universidad Católica in 2003. His spell ended in November of that year when manager Óscar Meneses removed him from the first-team squad following public comments made by the forward concerning the team's performances.

He subsequently joined Universidad Católica's rivals Universidad de Chile for the 2004 season.

=== Universidad de Chile ===
Gioino made a notable competitive debut for the club on 8 February, scoring twice in a 4–0 Superclásico victory over Colo-Colo at the Estadio Nacional.

Gioino became a regular goalscorer during Universidad de Chile's 2004 Apertura campaign. In the playoffs, he scored against Unión Española and then scored in both quarter-final matches against Universidad de Concepción. His goal in the second leg came in the 116th minute of extra time and qualified Universidad de Chile for the semi-finals under the tournament's golden-goal rule. Universidad de Chile eventually defeated Cobreloa on penalties in the final to win the Apertura championship, with Gioino starting both legs.

He remained an important attacking player during the first months of 2005. Gioino scored six goals in his first appearances of the domestic Apertura, including braces against Palestino and Unión Española. He also featured in the 2005 Copa Libertadores, where he attracted attention in Brazil after scoring twice against São Paulo FC at the Morumbi.

In April 2005, Palmeiras reached an agreement to sign Gioino for the Campeonato Brasileiro Série A. The Brazilian club recruited him to strengthen its attack, although he was initially unable to represent Palmeiras in the Copa Libertadores because he had already appeared in the competition for Universidad de Chile. He was officially presented by Palmeiras later that month.

=== Late career ===
Gioino returned to Universidad de Chile in 2006 following his spell in Brazil. He remained for one season before joining Unión Española in 2007.

In 2008, Gioino joined Brazilian Série B club Gama, but left before making his debut after the parties failed to finalize his contract.

In 2009, Gioino returned to Chile and joined Coquimbo Unido, where he played in the Primera B during the final stage of his professional career. He subsequently retired from professional football.

== Honours ==
Universidad de Chile

- Primera División de Chile: 2004 Apertura
