= Felipe Flores (footballer, born 1977) =

Chilean footballer

Personal information
- Full name: Felipe Ariel Flores Quijada
- Date of birth: 20 July 1977 (age 49)
- Place of birth: La Serena, Chile
- Height: 1.78 m (5 ft 10 in)
- Position: Forward

Youth career
- Academia Santa Inés
- Deportes La Serena

Senior career*
Years	Team	Apps	(Gls)
1995–1999	Deportes La Serena	128	(62)
2000	Colo-Colo	11	(1)
2001	Santos Laguna	0	(0)
2002	Santiago Wanderers	10	(0)
2003–2006	Deportes La Serena		
2004–2005	→ Boavista (loan)	10	(1)
2007–2008	Coquimbo Unido	57	(18)
2008	→ O'Higgins (loan)	12	(1)
Total		228	(83)
- * Club domestic league appearances and goals

Felipe Ariel Flores Quijada (born 20 July 1977) is a Chilean former professional footballer who played as a forward for clubs of Chile, Mexico and Portugal.

== Honours ==
Deportes La Serena

- Primera B de Chile: 1996
