= Marcelo Corrales =

Chilean footballer (born 1971)

Personal information
- Full name: Marcelo Enrique Corrales García
- Date of birth: 20 February 1971 (age 55)
- Place of birth: Santiago, Chile
- Position: Striker

Youth career
- Palestino

Senior career*
Years	Team	Apps	(Gls)
1988–1993	Palestino	61	(23)
1994	Universidad Católica	3	(0)
1995	Deportes Temuco	28	(12)
1996	Provincial Osorno	27	(13)
1997–1999	Palestino	88	(40)
2000	Santiago Wanderers	20	(7)
2001	Unión San Felipe	22	(15)
2001	Al Shabab	3	(0)
2002	Universidad de Chile	19	(3)
2003	Deportes Puerto Montt	32	(30)
2004–2007	Coquimbo Unido	132	(55)
2008	Municipal Iquique	25	(19)
2008–2009	Unión San Felipe	26	(26)
2010	Coquimbo Unido	7	(1)
2012	San Antonio Unido	13	(5)
Total		506	(249)

International career
1985	Chile U15		
2001	Chile	2	(1)
- * Club domestic league appearances and goals

Marcelo Enrique Corrales García (born 20 February 1971) is a Chilean former professional footballer who played as a striker.

== Club career ==
Born in Santiago, Corrales formerly played for Palestino, Universidad Católica, Deportes Temuco, Provincial Osorno, Santiago Wanderers, Unión San Felipe, Al-Shabab, Universidad de Chile, Deportes Puerto Montt, Coquimbo Unido and Municipal Iquique. In 2010, he retired from football after playing for Coquimbo Unido, but he returned to the activity by joining San Antonio Unido in the Tercera A in 2012.

Corrales is seventh on the list of all-time Chilean top scorers.

== International career ==
Corrales represented Chile at under-15 level in a tournament played in Coquimbo.

At senior level, he made two appearances for the Chile national team at the Copa América 2001, scoring one goal.

== Coaching career ==
Corrales has coached amateur clubs in the Liga Independiente de Fútbol in Santiago.

== Personal life ==
His son, Joan, is a former footballer who was in the Coquimbo Unido youth ranks and played for Swedish side Rågsveds IF in 2019.
