= 2001 Campeonato Nacional Primera División =

Campeonato Nacional Copa Banco del Estado
- Dates: 3 March – 9 December 2001
- Champions: Santiago Wanderers (3rd title)
- Relegated: O'Higgins; Deportes Puerto Montt
- 2002 Copa Libertadores: Santiago Wanderers; Universidad Católica (2nd place); Cobreloa (Liguilla winners)
- Matches: 240
- Goals: 719 (3 per match)
- Top goalscorer: Héctor Tapia (24)
- Biggest home win: Cobreloa 5–0 Santiago Morning (16 September)
- Biggest away win: O'Higgins 0–5 Santiago Wanderers (3 March)
- Total attendance: 1,449,298
- Average attendance: 6,038

The 2001 Campeonato Nacional was Chilean first tier's 70th season which Santiago Wanderers reached its third professional title after 33 years.

== Standings ==
Pos	Team	Pld	W	D	L	GF	GA	GD	Pts	Qualification or relegation
1	Santiago Wanderers	30	20	6	4	65	32	+33	66	Champions. Qualify to 2002 Copa Libertadores
2	Universidad Católica	30	18	6	6	60	29	+31	60	Qualify to 2002 Copa Libertadores
3	Universidad de Chile	30	17	6	7	53	33	+20	57	Qualify to Pre-Copa Libertadores Liguilla
4	Colo-Colo	30	16	8	6	63	37	+26	56	
5	Cobreloa	30	13	9	8	39	28	+11	48	Qualify to Pre-Copa Libertadores Liguilla
6	Palestino	30	14	6	10	44	43	+1	48	Qualify to Pre-Copa Libertadores Liguilla
7	Huachipato	30	12	10	8	58	42	+16	46	Qualify to Pre-Copa Libertadores Liguilla
8	Unión San Felipe	30	10	10	10	45	39	+6	40	
9	Unión Española	30	10	7	13	46	63	−17	37	
10	Coquimbo Unido	30	9	8	13	29	39	−10	35	
11	Audax Italiano	30	10	2	18	27	40	−13	32	
12	Deportes Concepción	30	8	8	14	35	51	−16	32	
13	Rangers	30	6	12	12	38	46	−8	30	
14	Santiago Morning	30	7	7	16	47	67	−20	28	
15	O'Higgins	30	7	4	19	39	64	−25	25	Relegation to Primera B
16	Deportes Puerto Montt	30	4	9	17	31	66	−35	21	Relegation to Primera B

Campeonato Nacional
2001 champions
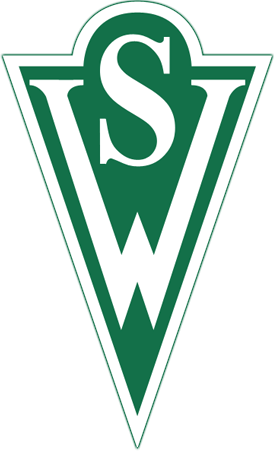
Santiago Wanderers
3rd title

== Results ==
Home \ Away	AUD	CLO	COL	DCO	COQ	HUA	OHI	PAL	DPM	RAN	SMO	USF	UCA	UCH	UES	SWA
Audax		1–0	0–3	0–2	1–0	0–0	2–1	1–2	2–0	2–1	1–1	0–2	0–2	2–3	3–2	2–4
Cobreloa	1–0		2–0	1–2	3–2	0–3	2–0	3–1	3–1	1–0	5–0	1–0	0–1	0–1	1–1	3–0
Colo-Colo	2–1	1–0		4–0	0–0	2–1	2–0	2–0	2–0	5–3	2–1	4–1	4–1	2–3	5–1	1–0
Concepción	1–2	0–0	2–2		1–2	3–3	1–0	1–2	3–0	0–1	0–0	1–1	0–4	2–2	5–2	2–0
Coquimbo	1–0	2–1	1–3	2–0		0–3	1–2	0–0	2–2	1–1	3–0	0–0	0–1	2–1	0–1	0–1
Huachipato	3–1	0–0	1–0	2–2	2–2		2–1	1–2	3–1	2–1	4–1	2–1	1–1	1–2	2–2	3–4
O'Higgins	1–0	1–1	4–2	1–1	0–1	0–4		4–3	2–3	0–0	2–3	4–3	4–1	0–2	1–2	0–5
Palestino	1–0	1–2	0–2	1–0	0–1	2–0	2–2		2–2	5–1	1–0	0–0	3–2	1–4	2–2	1–2
P. Montt	1–0	1–1	3–2	2–0	1–1	0–3	0–2	0–1		1–1	0–0	1–1	2–5	0–2	2–3	3–3
Rangers	1–2	2–2	1–1	1–2	3–0	1–1	2–1	2–3	2–0		3–1	2–1	0–0	0–2	1–1	1–1
S. Morning	0–3	1–2	3–3	1–2	3–1	2–2	4–1	2–3	4–1	2–1		1–1	2–2	3–4	3–5	1–5
San Felipe	1–0	1–1	2–2	2–0	4–1	3–2	5–1	1–2	2–2	2–2	1–0		1–0	1–1	3–0	1–2
U. Católica	2–0	0–1	1–1	2–0	3–0	2–1	4–0	0–0	4–0	3–1	6–3	1–0		0–1	5–1	2–2
U. Chile	1–0	1–1	1–1	4–0	0–2	0–0	3–2	3–1	3–1	1–0	0–1	2–3	0–1		4–0	0–0
U. Española	0–1	1–1	3–3	2–1	1–0	2–4	2–1	1–2	4–1	2–2	0–3	2–1	0–1	2–1		0–2
S. Wanderers	1–0	3–0	1–0	5–1	1–1	4–2	2–1	2–0	2–0	1–1	3–1	2–0	1–3	4–1	2–1	

Legend: Blue = home team win; Yellow = draw; Red = away team win.

== Top goal-scorer ==
- Héctor Tapia (Colo-Colo) 24 goals

== Liguilla Pre-Copa Libertadores ==
=== Semifinals ===
11 December 2001	Huachipato	3 – 2	Cobreloa	Estadio Las Higueras
	Own-goal 63'; Ceballos 66'; Torrico 75'		30' Cornejo; 59' Own-goal	Attendance: 4,851; Referee: G. Aros

11 December 2001	Palestino	1 – 0	Universidad de Chile	Estadio Santa Laura
	Segalla 42'			Attendance: 6,457; Referee: E. Ponce

13 December 2001	Cobreloa	3 – 0	Huachipato	Estadio Municipal de Calama
	Madrid 40'; Pérez 53'; Cornejo 59'			Attendance: 2,567; Referee: M. Sánchez

13 December 2001	Universidad de Chile	3 – 1	Palestino	Estadio Santa Laura
	Barrera 18' (pen.), 55' (pen.); Maestri 87'		59' Caro	Attendance: 10,000; Referee: B. Arenas

=== Finals ===
18 December 2001	Cobreloa	4 – 4	Universidad de Chile	Estadio Municipal de Calama
	Cornejo 14' (pen.); Dinamarca 47'; Vergara 54'; Galaz 58'		42' Barrera; 74' González; 77' (pen.) Rivarola; 86' Own-goal	Attendance: 5,422; Referee: R. Selman

20 December 2001	Universidad de Chile	1 – 2 (a.e.t.)	Cobreloa	Estadio Nacional
	Maestri 87'		45' Madrid; 107' Cornejo	Attendance: 22,000; Referee: C. Chandía

Cobreloa qualified for the 2001 Copa Libertadores
