= Juan Quiroga (footballer, born 1973) =

Chilean footballer

Personal information
- Full name: Juan Antonio Quiroga Rojas
- Date of birth: 28 March 1973 (age 53)
- Place of birth: La Serena, Chile
- Height: 1.70 m (5 ft 7 in)
- Position: Attacking midfielder

Youth career
- Academia Santa Inés
- Deportes La Serena

Senior career*
Years	Team	Apps	(Gls)
1992–1994	Deportes La Serena		
1995–1998	Universidad de Chile		
1997	→ Puerto Montt (loan)		
1999–2001	Puerto Montt		
2002	Deportes Temuco		
2003–2006	Cobresal	133	(61)
2007–2009	Deportes La Serena	44	(8)
2009	Coquimbo Unido		
- * Club domestic league appearances and goals as of 8 March 2012

Juan Antonio Quiroga Rojas (born 28 March 1973) is a former Chilean footballer. He played as playmaker during his year active and is the current Primera División (first-tier) all-time top-scorer of Deportes Puerto Montt.

== Club career ==
Born in La Serena and product of his hometown club Deportes La Serena, he debuted in 1992 and scored his first goal one year later on 6 August, which was the only of the game that meant a 1–0 win over Deportes Temuco.

In January 1995, Quiroga moved to his country's powerhouse Universidad de Chile where was member of the champion team that reached league title in his first season, but failed to repeat his breakthrough seasons at Serena, being usually relegated to the bench. However, he was loaned to Puerto Montt in 1997 for then complete a permanent deal with the salmon team in 1999 where Quiroga began Los Lagos Region based-side top scorer in their first tier history with 28 goals.

In 2002, he had a successful spell in Deportes Temuco where scored 15 consecutive penalty goals, of which he failed one against Colo-Colo after the record. The next year he moved to Cobresal where netted 61 goals in 133 appearances after a three-season spell (2003–2006).

In January 2007 he returned to Deportes La Serena where had well performances into an unsuccessful season of his team. However the following year he usually wasn't nominated and failing to be starter Quiroga left the club in December 2008.

After a six-months absence without play, in June 2009, Quiroga joined Serena's cross-town rivals Coquimbo Unido, making his debut precisely against his former team in a 2–1 friendly win at Francisco Sánchez Rumoso. His competitive debut came on 5 July in a 2–0 win over Deportes Copiapó where scored his side's second goal.

== Honours ==
=== Club ===
Universidad de Chile

- Primera División de Chile (1): 1995
