= Estadio Zorros del Desierto =

Stadium in Calama, Chile

- El infierno naranja (The Orange Hell)

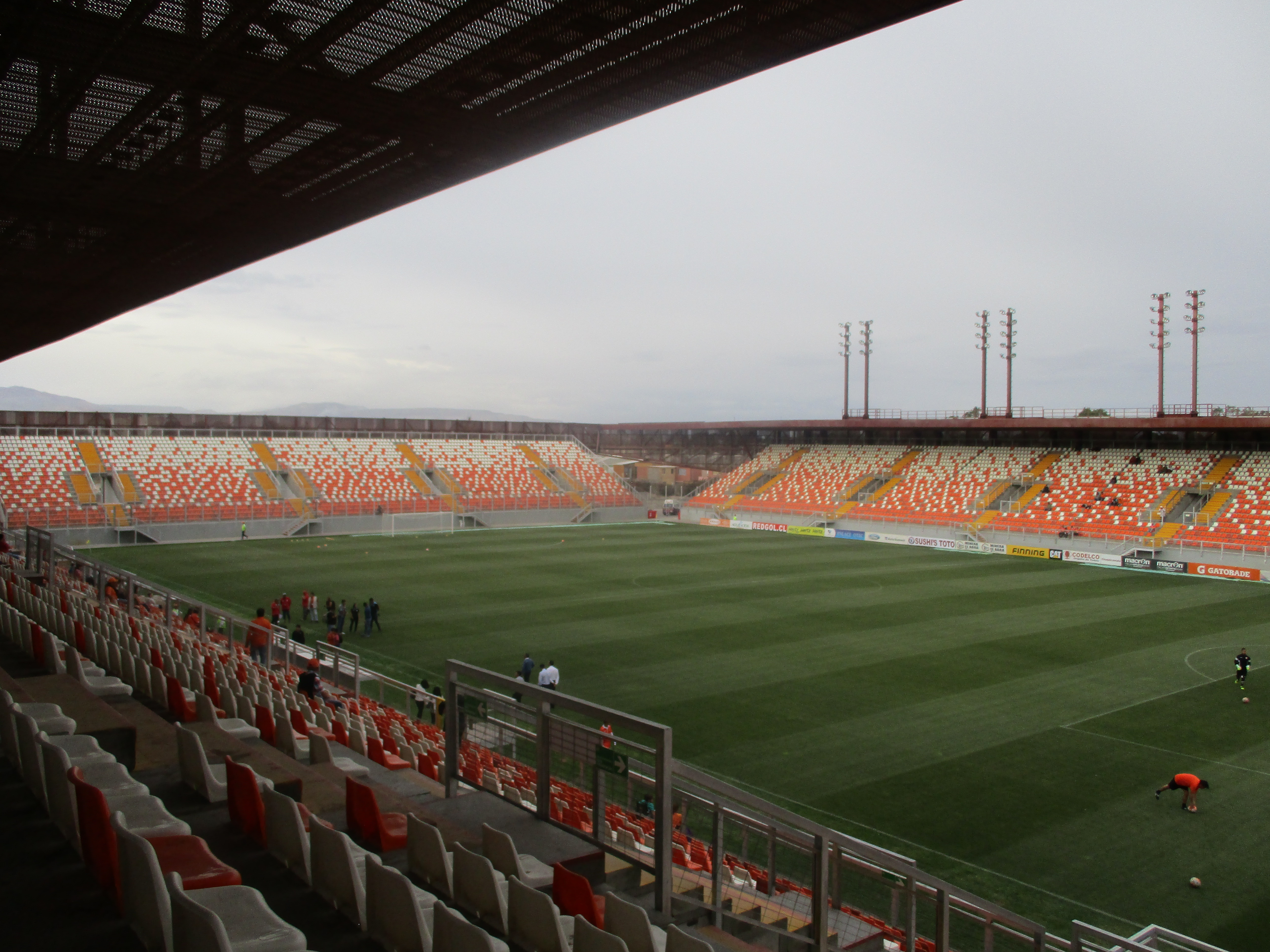
- Aerial View of the Stadium.

- Calama, Chile
- Interactive map of Estadio Zorros del Desierto
- Full name: Estadio Municipal "Zorros del Desierto" de Calama
- Former names: Estadio Municipal de Calama (1952–2014)
- Location: Matta Avenue, no Number; Calama, Chile
- Coordinates: 22°27′37″S 68°55′14″W
- Elevation: 2,274 m (7,461 ft)
- Owner: Municipality of Calama
- Operator: Municipality of Calama
- Seating type: Stadium seating
- Capacity: 12,098 seatings (excluding V.I.P. Seating)
- Executive suites: 214
- Type: Stadium
- Surface: Ryegrass and Lolium arundinaceum Mixture
- Scoreboard: 28 m^{2} LED screen
- Record attendance: 11,750 (C.D.Cobreloa - C.D. Concepción, December 7, 2025)
- Field size: 105 m × 68 m (344 ft × 223 ft)
- Field shape: Rectangular
- Acreage: 8,311.16 m^{2} (2.05373 acres)
- Public transit: Empresa de Transporte Publico Linea 177 Calama

Construction
- Groundbreaking: February 3, 2013
- Built: February 3, 2013 – April 18, 2015
- Opened: 12 November 1952; 74 years ago
- Renovated: April 18, 2015
- Cost: US$ 8,66 million CLP 12.038.402.000; EU€ 7,76 million
- Architects: Gerardo Marambio Cortés; Claudio Aceituno Husch; Patricia Vidal Aguayo
- Project managers: Instituto Nacional de Deportes – IND; Municipality of Calama
- Structural engineer: Iván Hrepic
- Main contractor: Isolux Corsan

Tenant
- Cobreloa: 2015-Present

Website
- Municipality of Calama website

Estadio Municipal "Zorros del Desierto" de Calama (Spanish pronunciation: [esˈtaðjo ˈθoros ðel deˈsjeɾto] ) is a football stadium in Calama, Chile, owned by the municipality of Calama. It is the home field of the Cobreloa football team and is sometimes used by the Chile national football team to serve as their home ground. This stadium was used as the homeground of Deportes Iquique in the Copa Libertadores 2017 and of Cobresal in the Copa Libertadores 2024. This is the fifteenth largest stadium in Chile by capacity in 2024.

The present stadium, opened in 2015, replaced the old Estadio Municipal de Calama, built in 1952 by the Abaroa family to provide sports facilities for the city and demolished in 2013. The stadium seats 12,346 people and includes zones for disabled people. The stadium was built to FIFA standards and logistics.

This stadium was cited as one of the best in the world in 2015 by the Database of Stadiums. The stadium was considered the smallest and least expensive among the participants. It finished in 19th place with 14,837 points.

The former mayor of Calama, Esteban Velasquez, said that the maintenance costs were 300 million CLP, mainly directed to the maintenance of the court, dependencies and officials working in the enclosure. It is fully funded by the municipality. Cobreloa paid a commission to the municipality of around 800,000 CLP per month to help in the maintenance of the stadium through May 2016.

== Name ==
The first stadium name proposal was to honour former Cobreloa player Fernando Cornejo, who died in 2009. It became the name of the stadium project in 2010. However, this project name was not given to the stadium.

In April 2014, in a reunion between local authorities, it was decided that the name would be chosen by Calama mayor, Esteban Velazquez, and the Consejo de Sociedad Civil (Cososi). The proposed alternatives were: Arena, Pucará, Vicente Cantatore, Mario Lira and Fernando Cornejo.

Name	Votes
Zorros del Desierto	1088
Fernando Cornejo Jiménez	937
Héroes del Topater	825
Corazón Minero Calama	518
Río Loa	355
Sergio Stoppel García	210
Alturas del Loa	195
Héctor Puebla Saavedra	135
Coloso Minero	106
Mario Lira Solas	89
Defensores del Topater	87
Glorias del Desierto	86
Roberto Rodríguez Antiquera	65
Nicolás Tschishow Titow	8
References	

Ultimately, the name was decided through voting, through a campaign called "Ponle nombre al Municipal de Calama". With a video titled 'Corporación de Cultura y Turismo de Calama', the municipality invited the community of Calama, Chile, to propose names. Initially seven names were proposed, but the registration period was extended in September 2014. Eventually 4,721 voters chose among 14 proposals. The winner was the 'Zorros del Desierto' option, with 1,088 votes. The second, the third and the fourth places were used to name different areas of the stadium. The Mario Lira option was taken to name the media cabins.

== History ==
=== Estadio Municipal de Calama ===
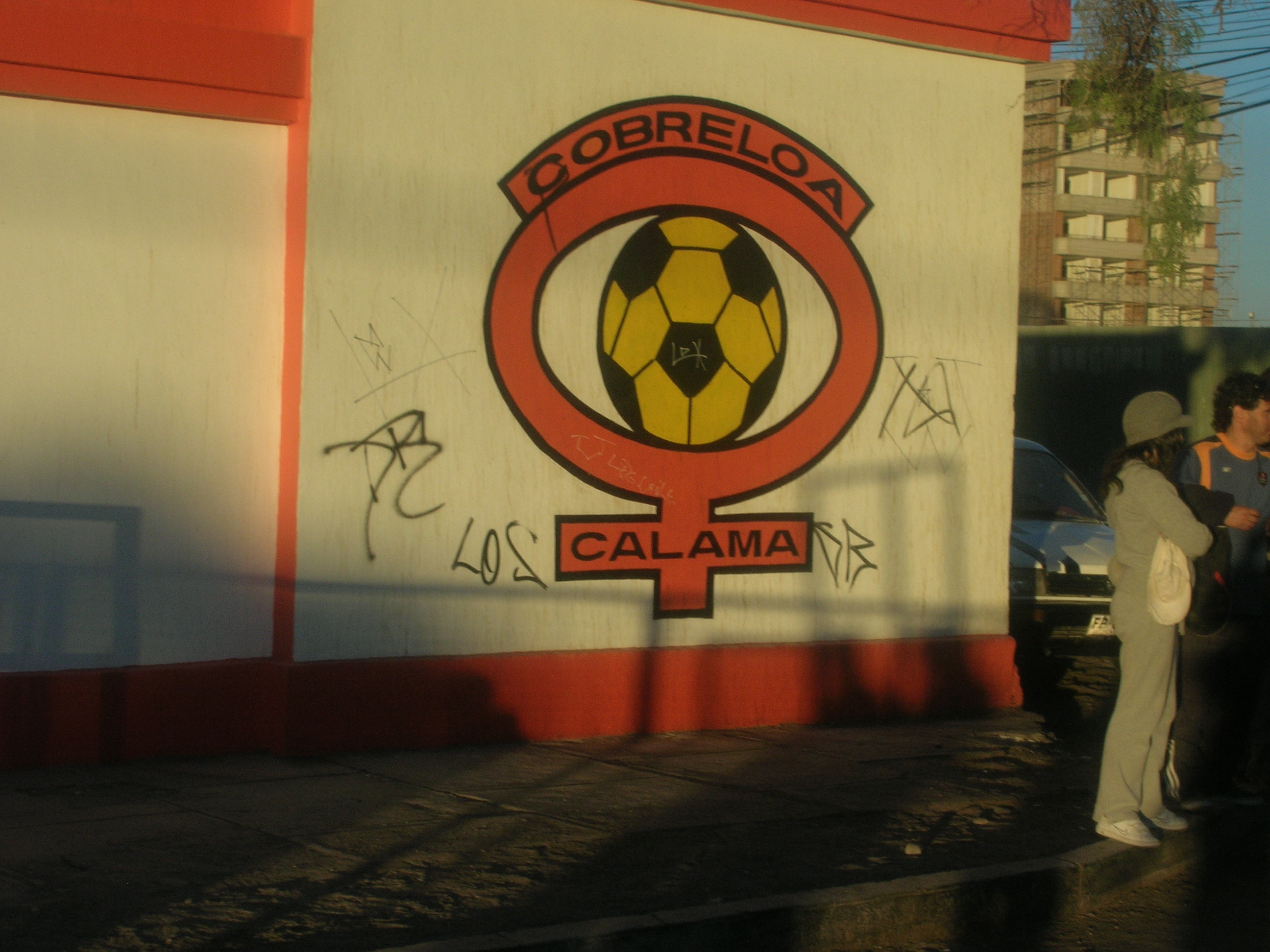
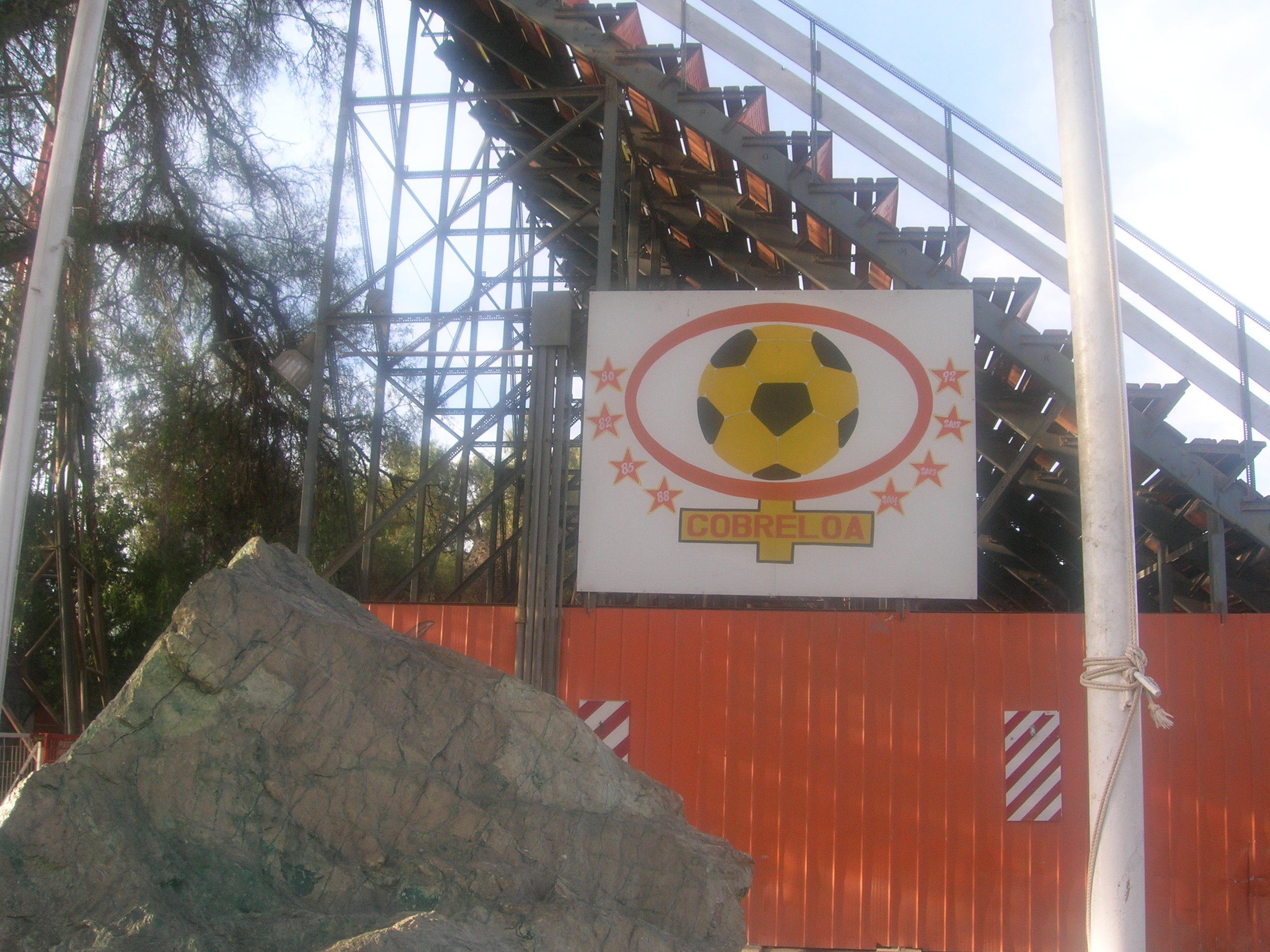
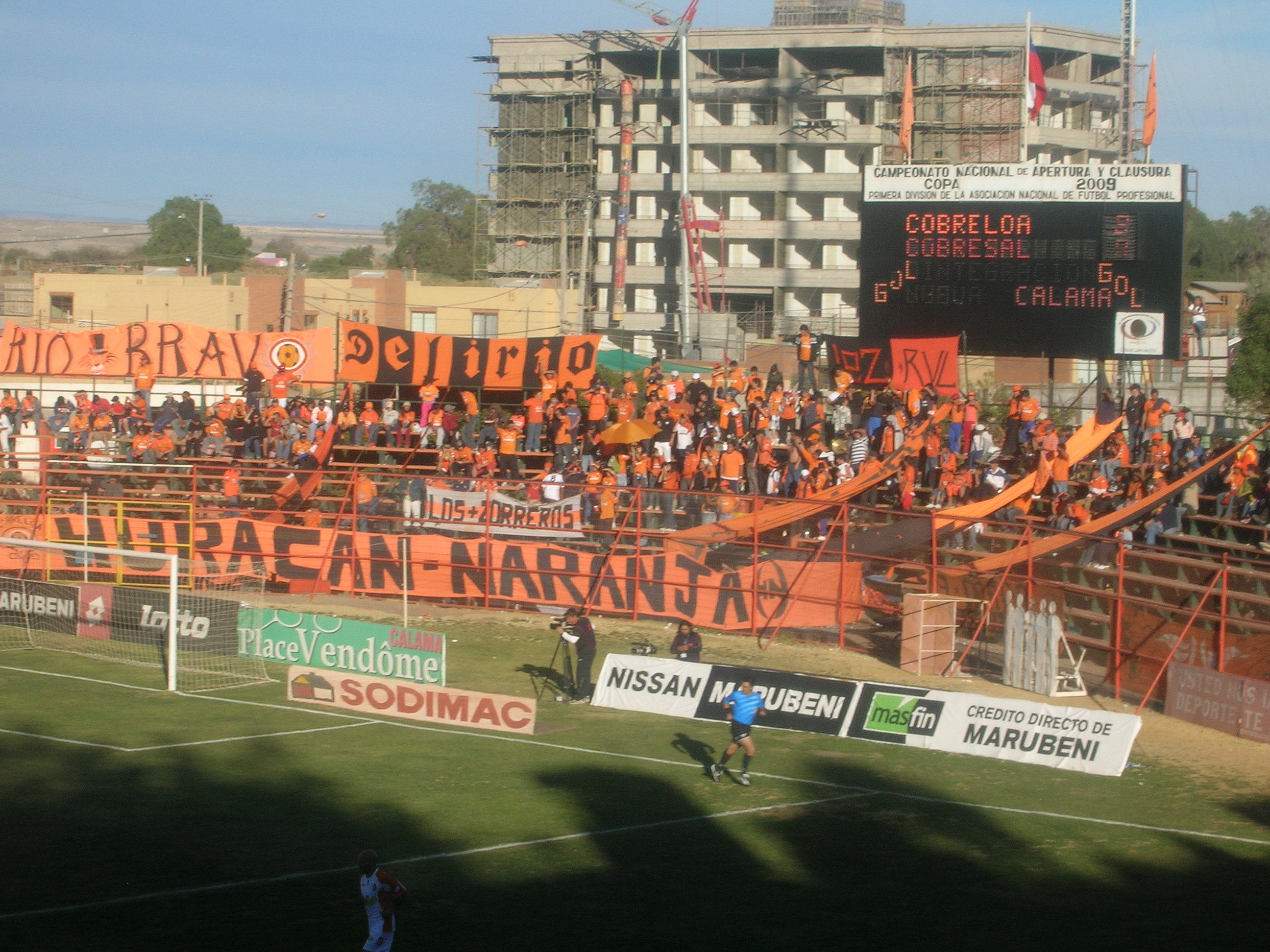
Estadio Municipal de Calama previous to the rebuilt in 2009.

The Estadio Municipal de Calama was a multi-use stadium in Calama, used mostly for football matches and it was the home stadium of Cobreloa until 2012. The stadium held 13,000 people (seating capacity),

The generally accepted date for the opening of the Estadio Municipal de Calama is 1952. There are references, however, from before that date concerning a stadium in Calama. In the municipal minutes dating back to 1932, where the mayor reports on agreements made based on public proposals, the presentation and possibility of establishing organizations, including stadiums, is reported. This was due to the immediate concern for modern venues. In the municipal minutes of 1933, during discussions about the purpose of the budget to be used for the municipal slaughterhouse, the Director of Works suggested dividing the budget between this project and the construction of the municipal stadium.

On Wednesday, December 23, 1942, an extraordinary session was held under the President of the Chamber of Deputies of Chile, Pedro Castelblanco, in which one of the points to be discussed was the authorization to the municipality of Calama to contract a loan to build municipal structures, which was 12 million Chilean pesos in total, of which 200 thousand pesos of that were given for the completion of the municipal stadium. At that time, the mayor of Calama, Mr. Ernesto Meza Jeria, met with the Minister of Finance, Guillermo del Pedregal, to authorize the city municipality to obtain the special loan, which would be used in the network of buildings projected in this area. Mr. Pedregal's idea was to improve the visibility of the sector and reduce the rate of alcoholism in it.

The stadium's ownership has been registered in the name of the municipality of Calama, under the ownership of the El Loa Real Estate Registrar, since 1945.

In 1948, activities were recorded in the stadium, such as the national football championship held there, in which representatives of associations from Antofagasta, Pedro de Valdivia, Chuquicamata, Maria Elena and Calama performed.

On October 11, 1959, the Chilean Amateur Football Championship was launched, where the matches to determine the champion of this tournament were chosen as the venue. In order for the city to be able to organize this event, the municipality invested 60 million CLP in the venue, where the stands were expanded, dressing rooms were fitted, the venue was equipped with electric lighting and repairs were made to the field itself. On November 9 of that year, the final was played in the stadium: the amateur team from Calama faced the team of Tomás Bata from Peñaflor, winning by 3 goals to 2.

By 1971, the stadium had a capacity for 10,000 people, and had lighting, grass, Olympic-sized fencing, 6 large locker rooms, an athletic track, toilets and ticket offices. The home team was Sport Cóndor, recognised by ANFA, which would later be called Deportes El Loa.

A match took place to commemorate the first anniversary of the nationalization of mineral copper by the Chilean State. Between Deportes El Loa and Colo-Colo, the victory was for the team from Santiago de Chile, by 5–2.

According to the former player of the Cobreloa team, Carlos Rojas, in 1977 when the Loíno team entered professional football, modifications were made to the stadium so that it could host matches of this nature.

After the Cobreloa club won its first national title in 1980, in order to compete in the 1981 Copa Libertadores, improvements were made to the stadium, primarily to the lighting towers. These improvements were carried out by the Coordinación Regional de Deportes y Recreación, as well as to the field, which was managed by CODELCO, Chuquicamata division.

The last match before the stadium was rebuilt was on February 3, 2013, valid for the national football championship of that year. The teams Cobreloa and Deportes Iquique played in front of 4,662 spectators. The match ended with a 4–1 victory for the home team.

According to the financial report submitted by the Cobreloa club in 2013, the stadium's infrastructure that year included: Pácifico sector bleachers with a capacity of 5,208, Ándes sector bleachers with a capacity of 2,850 and north and south sector bleachers with a capacity of 3,952 people. (Note: Before its reconstruction, the stadium did not have individual seats; its capacity was measured by the number of people who could fit inside the planks used as seats.) There were also a locker room for referees, a locker room for coaching staff, two locker rooms for local and visiting professional teams, two locker rooms for local and visiting cadet players, an equipped gym, a conference room, an administration office, two cafeterias with customer service and eight ticket offices for home games.

=== Proposal ===
A new stadium in Calama was first suggested in 2007, when architect Andrés Valle made a model of the project; it was well received by the authorities. This showed that the community and the private sector were interested in a new venue. In 2008, Cobreloa representative Gerardo Mella proposed the project to the authorities of Calama. With the consultation of the company Alberto Saltori y Asociados, Cobreloa would dedicate CLP 35 to 40 million to this project.

In 2009, on Chile, the President Michelle Bachelet announced the inclusion of Calama in the third phase of the 'Estadios Bicentenario' projects. Representative Marcos Espinoza had referred to the project financing with an amount of CLP 300 million, either for a renovation or a new structure.

In 2010, parliamentarian Marcos Espinoza announced to the media the possibility that this project would be not included in the 2011 budget.

On March 15, 2010, the design of the Municipal Stadium project began. The project was awarded a total of 70,000,000 CLP, was scheduled to last 80 calendar days, and was scheduled to be completed in October of that year, financed by the mining company El Abra. The first stage of the design consisted of a location study, preliminary delivery of the preliminary project and architectural design, a soil mechanics study, and a road study. The second stage consisted of the engineering design. The architects of this project were Ricardo Judson Bilbao, Roberto Olivos Marchant, Javier Ávila Burrows, and Isabél Perelló Rosés, represented by the group Judson y Olivos Arquiectos. The projected surface area for the project was approximately 17,500 square meters and the projected materials were prefabricated concrete structures, steel, stone veneers and copper cladding. The project included 4 entrances to the stadium, and the roof of the structure would be made with Stripweave cladding by Hunter Douglas.

On July 15, 2011, the Regional Investment Draft was made public, outlining the investments made in the Calama Stadium project prior to 2012. The statement detailed public spending by funding source: the Fondo Nacional de Desarrollo Regional invested CLP 800,000,000, and the municipality of Calama invested CLP 1,500,000.

In August 2011, the municipality of Calama presented the 2010 plan, which included a preliminary project, for the remodelling of the Municipal Stadium. This stadium would increase the capacity of spectators to 15,000, and would also have synthetic grass, closed circuit television, snack areas, parking and lighting. In its first stage of construction, it contemplated the construction of 8,500 seats.

In 2011, Chilean President Sebastián Piñera announced that $170 million U.S. dollars was to be invested in improving the infrastructure of Chile's stadiums through the 'Chilestadios' project, in which the Estadio Municipal de Calama was included.

On May 14, 2012, a vote was held on the agreement that led the Illustrious Municipality of Calama to determine the cost of financing and maintaining the project, amounting to CLP 311,772,636, provided that the project was approved and financed by the Regional Government.

The ultimate project was shown to Calama mayor, Estebán Velásquez Nuñez, in 2012. In this phase of the project the Consejo Regional decided how the amounts would be distributed. The Instituto Nacional del Deporte (IND) allocated CLP 5,000 million to the project. The technical team of the municipality of Calama led by Gloria Aliaga was in charge of different project phases. In July 2012, the then president of the republic, accompanied by the general secretary of government, Andrés Chadwick and the undersecretary of sports, Gabriel Ruiz Tagle, officially presented the project to the community in general.

"Era impensado no tener un estadio en Calama y hoy día el trabajo que hemos desarrollado en la Municipalidad ha dado sus frutos"

"It was unthinkable not to have a stadium in Calama and today the work we have developed in the Municipality has paid off"

— Estebán Velásquez Nuñez

The municipality of Calama had to deposit the project at the Banco Integrado de 'Proyectos del Ministerio de Planificación Social'. The resource allocation of the 'Fondo Regional of Desarrollo Social' was subtracted by the 'Consejo Regional' of Antofagasta Region to enter the tendering.

The proposal was for a concrete structure with 12,000 individual seats, including a place for disabled people. The project had 4 floors, with dressing room for the players and referees, hygienic services, snack hall, media area, first aid hall and LED screen. The field dimensions were 105 x 68 meters with natural grass. The design was inspired by the aging copper bars in order to provide identification to the community in the area.

In September 2012, the National Sports Institute, led by Undersecretary of Sports Gabriel Ruiz Tagle, launched the bidding process for the stadium reconstruction project. The bidding terms were made available on the Public Market website, and a deadline of 330 calendar days was set for completion.

In 2012 non-compliance to bidding rules delayed construction, which is why the 'Instituto Nacional del Deporte' had to seek alternatives to avoid altering the route of the process. The first tender was declared void because the contracting companies that participated in it did not comply with all the requirements imposed in it. The participating companies were Corsam Corviam and Ingeniería y Construcciones SERINCO Limitada.

=== Construction ===
Due to the special nature of the contract to be signed, the Instituto Nacional del Deporte entered into a direct contract with the Spanish company Isolux Corsan on December 17, 2012, who had participated in the void tender, and the contract was approved on December 19 of that year. On January 30, 2013, the contract required the company to complete the work within a period of 330 calendar days and the land was handed over for subsequent construction. The initial budget for the execution of the work according to the contract was CLP 8,659,965,129. The dismantling works started the same day with the removal of stadium light bulbs.

By February of that year, the grass that was used for the stadium matches prior to its reconstruction was used to decorate public spaces in the city, mainly its squares. This work was carried out by the Cleaning Department of the Municipality of Calama.

According to the project's work logs, there were delays in the delivery of land adjacent to the Ándes section of the stadium in March of this year, where the municipal water park is located. The drinking water tanks, sewage system, perimeter fences, and lighting tower were located in this area.

In April of this year, the 'Instituto Nacional del Deporte' and the 'Gobierno Regional' increased project financing to CLP 12,000 million approximately.

In April 2013, demolition and debris removal work was carried out, while earthmoving was carried out in parallel, representing 6% of the total work. On June 28, a variation in the execution of the work was approved, with the incorporation of missing items within it, considered as an extension of the project. At the erection of the first pillar to be placed in the work and with the presence of the undersecretary of sports at that time with other authorities of the Calama and Antofagasta, the ceremony to start the rebuild of the stadium took place on July 2, 2013. At that time the undersecretary referred to the deadline for the completion of the work as being the end of that same year. The next day, the building permit was processed by the municipality. The construction was classified as a major equipment construction, the property where the construction began covering about 43,459 square meters in total, corresponding to the stadium, pool and municipal jogging track. The project presented regulatory non-compliances regarding the limits presented due to its location in the communal regulatory plan with respect to its nature, where it was highlighted that its height exceeded the limit established as its constructability limit, according to national construction standards: the project management was urged to seek authorisation for these breaches.

In May, a public tender was held for the contract to install the seats in the stands and the substitute benches at the stadium. Fernando Mayer S.A. was awarded the contract. In June, the tender for the procurement and installation of the LED screen for the project was held. The contract was awarded to the company SOC COM WU Y PAZZANESE LTDA.

On August 16, the contract modification with the company, which had been executed on June 28 of that year, was approved for the purposes of this resolution. Items were modified to ensure the complete execution of the original project. This was due to the fact that at the beginning of the contract in 2012, the renovations could not be fully awarded to the contractor due to insufficient funding. These extraordinary items included railings, paint, PEX, refined slabs, wall waterproofing, exposed concrete ceilings, architectural exterior lighting on the façade, air conditioning equipment, and enclosures.

By November 2013, progress had reached only 40%. The revised completion date was the end of the first quarter of 2014.

On December 20, the first extension of the project deadline was made, thus also increasing the items and the variation in the project execution up to January 20, 2014. The contract price was increased by CLP 287,704,474, the reason being technical arguments referring to improving the quality of the work, which implied physical and technical modifications, thus requiring the need to carry out new works, considered extraordinary. These new items were mainly directed towards the electrical project of the work.

=== 2014 ===
In April progress reached 85% and regional governor Valentín Volta said the stadium would be completed in the second half of the year.

In May salaries to company employees went unpaid over delays. On June 16, the resolution authorizing payment for the extraordinary works determined in December 2013 was issued. This resolution confirmed the extension of the deadline, leaving it at 356 calendar days. In July payments to workers of Isolux – Corsan were delayed. On August 1, the work was again regularized by resolution, leaving a total of 516 calendar days. The deadlines since the previous resolution in June were recorded. For September, it was announced that the new stadium would be opened in November that year, due to delays in municipal delivery of this. Due to delays and a failure to cover outstanding debts to its subcontractors, Isolux-Corsan ran into difficulties. The new completion date was early 2015.

The then Chile National Football coach, Jorge Sampaoli, had planned to use the stadium for matches with Brazil and Argentina in the 2018 FIFA World Cup qualification.

On October 6, a resolution regularized payment for the project, with a total deadline of 516 calendar days. It indicated that payment for extraordinary works was required and that administrative measures had been taken against the official responsible for the National Sports Institute due to debts attributed to late payments to the company contracted to carry out the extraordinary works established in the previous contract extensions.

In November 2013, the tender for the stadium's public address system was held. The selected company was to be responsible for the provision, implementation, and installation of an integrated monitoring and supervision system using security software. YAMAIMPORT S.A. was awarded the contract.

By December 31, another resolution again regularized the construction deadline, extending it by 128 days, for a total of 644 calendar days, with a proposed completion date of November 4 of the same year. No extension was requested this time. The observations highlighted the responsibilities of officials from the National Sports Institute. In a memorandum, the National Sports Institute sought to fine the company Corsan for 104 days, covering the period from July 1 to December 10 of that year. This was rejected because, according to the contract stipulations, the supervisory body was responsible for allocating the increased deadlines corresponding to that period.

By the time Corsam began its work, the amount due to deadline extensions and project budgetary injections had reached CLP 11,154,761.58 over a period of 729 calendar days.

=== 2015 ===
In January 2015, during a visit to the site, Mayor Valentín Volta set the deadline for the initial delivery of the project as February 9 of that year. However, due to the need for testing and administrative procedures, February was set as the date for opening to the community.

In February 2015 there were delays over the bathrooms, which were not complete. The opening date of the stadium was April 18.

The 'Instituto Nacional del Deporte' donated an amount greater than CLP 200 million to finish the work. This money was given for improved protection bars, ticket offices, bathrooms, illuminations, boilers and elevator. These improvements were to finish in 2016.

==== First match ====
On April 18 the stadium's first match was between Cobreloa and Deportes Antofagasta, for the Primera División de Chile Match in the fifteenth game-week, at 16:00 (GMT-3). Cobreloa won the match with goals by Diego Silva (6'), Rodolfo González (21') and José Luis Jiménez (58'). Attendance came to 10,200 spectators. The referee of this match was Eduardo Gamboa.

Cobreloa entered the field with the following line-up:

Line-up:

- Sebastián Contreras
- Diego Silva
- Martín Zbrun
- Rodolfo González
- Miguel Sanhueza
- Eric Ahumada
- Gustavo Cristaldo
- Cristián Gaitán
- José Pérez
- José Luis Jiménez
- Álvaro López
- Coach: Marco Antonio Figueroa

April 18, 2016	(Chile) Cobreloa	3–1	Deportes Antofagasta (Chile)	Calama, Chile
16:00 (UTC-03:00)	Diego Silva 6'; Rodolfo González 21'; José Luis Jiménez 58'	Report	Alejandro Delfino 74'	Stadium: Estadio Zorros del Desierto (Chile); Attendance: 10,200; Referee: Eduardo Gamboa (Chile)

=== Certification ===
The Departamento Prevención de Riesgo Forestal y Ambiente (O.S-5), that regulates security standards of the stadiums of Chile, determined on March 23, 2016, that this stadium met those standards, being a stadium suitable for large-scale events, meeting 63% of the requirements.

=== LaMia Flight 2933 Reaction ===
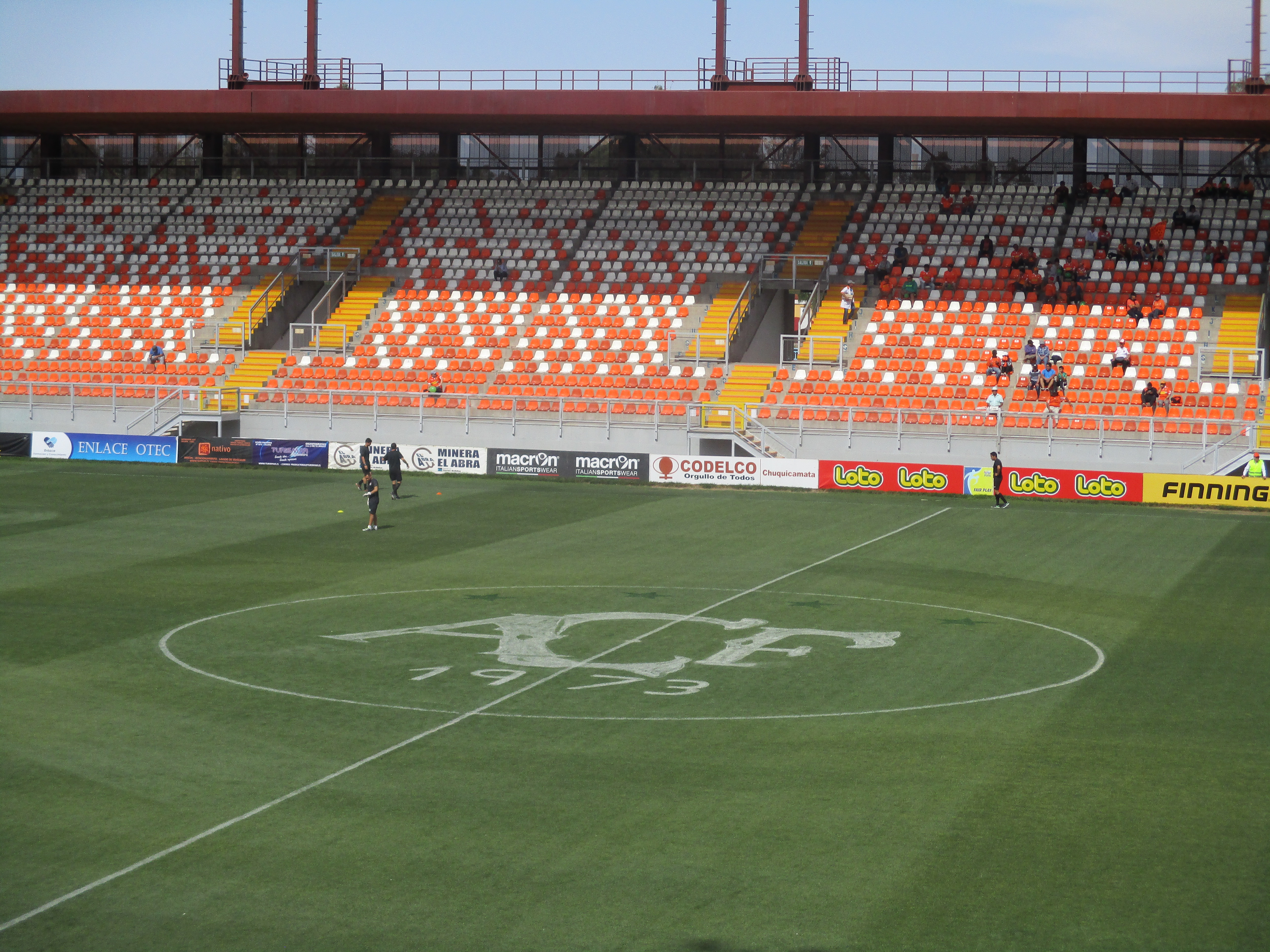
Tribute of Cobreloa to the victims of LaMia Flight 2933 on December 4, 2016

On December 4, 2016, Club de Deportes Cobreloa decided to make a tribute to the victims of LaMia Flight 2933, in which personnel of the Associação Chapecoense de Futebol team, journalists of Brazil and Bolivian air crew were among the 71 people killed. This tribute consisted of a drawing of the logo of the team in the middle of the field. Before the match a minute of silence paid tribute to the victims. Cobreloa wore a commemorative jersey with the Chapecoense logo below the team logo. The LED screen showed the Chapecoense logo over Cobreloa and the rival logo intermittently.

=== 2026 ===
To the January 17, the enty dependent of Municipality of Calama, the Corporación Municipal de Deportes y Recreación (CORMUDEP) organizated an event to baptize the stadium. The event had a wide list of national and international athletes including the tennis olympic gold medal winner, Fernando González, to face selected players of Cobreloa through its history, with a friendly match. Previous to this event, the authorities of the city made an ancenstral ritual called Pago a la tierra to bless the stadium and the presentation of the Cobreloa squad.

== International matches ==
On February 17, 1985, the Chilean national football team played its first international match at this stadium, facing the Danish team Vejle Boldklub, winning 5–0, thanks to two goals by Jorge Aravena, and one each by Héctor Puebla, Juan Carlos Letelier and Luis Alberto Mosquera.

In 1997, there was a request from the National Football Federation for the stadium to host a qualifying match for the France 98 World Cup against the Argentinian national football team, on September 10 of that year.

The second time that the Chilean national team played at home in this stadium was on May 26, 2010, in a friendly match against the Zambian national team, in preparation for the 2010 World Cup. The result was 3–0 in favor of Chile with two goals by Alexis Sánchez and one by Jorge Valdivia.

On January 27, 2022, at 21:15 hrs PM UTC -4, this stadium was host of the first Chile International match for World cup qualification, outside Santiago, Chile, against the Argentina National Football Team valid for the Matchday 15 of this competition. The score of this match was 1–2, an Argentinian victory, with goals by Ben Brereton Díaz for Chile and Ángel Di Maria and Lautaro Martinez for Argentina. The public attendance was 8,800.

January 27, 2022	Chile	1-2	Argentina	Calama, Chile
21:15 (UTC-04:00)	Ben Brereton Díaz 20'	Report	Ángel Di Maria 9'; Lautaro Martínez 34'	Stadium: Estadio Zorros del Desierto (Chile); Attendance: 8,800; Referee: Anderson Daronco (Brazil)

== Construction and design ==
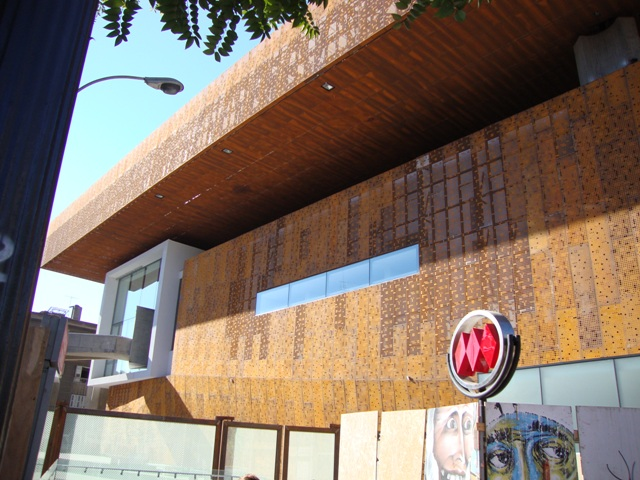
The design of the front of this stadium was made as a reference to the Centro Cultural Gabriela Mistral.

The concept of the stadium is based on mining, which is the area's principal economic activity. The roof of the stadium shows copper bars. The reference of the front of the stadium was the building Centro Cultural Gabriela Mistral.

The stadium is mainly of prefabricated concrete structure. As this material is not found in the city, the main contractor of this work subcontracted to the company Grau S.A. to install a factory into the works area in the stadium to create this structure. One of the characteristics of this concrete is that it is made of mix to get a H-40 type of concrete, a mix designed to make the coarse works of the stadium. One of the problems during the refoundation of the stadium was the low manpower in the city. For this reason the main architect decided to invest in heavy machines to carry out the work.

The front cover is made of steel (coated with weathering steel) to give the stadium an aged copper look and an anti-corrosive surface. Initially a copper membrane was proposed for the lining of the stadium. The idea was abandoned because of the lack of a Chilean manufacturer and the ultimate green color of the material. The decision to use this material was mainly the dry weather of the city, and the need to avoid damage from it.

The stadium lighting includes 16 light posts placed on the interior of the deck, making it suitable for high definition video. The front of the stadium has changing decorative lights.

The evacuation routes are painted with yellow in the steps and risers of the stadium with enlarged size of this.

The stadium has specimens of schinus molle, autochthonous to the area, which had been present for decades in the previous structure, and the design of the reconstruction of the stadium contemplated preserving these and the ecosystem of the stadium itself.

Also inside the stadium there are monuments given by both the community and the state company CODELCO, in which there is a statue of a fox, in commemoration of the promotion obtained by the Cobreloa team in its 2023 season, as well as a rock which contains copper ore, which was in place before the stadium was rebuilt. At the initiative of the municipality of the city, inside the stadium there are murals that allude to the history of the Cobreloa club and the coaches who have been promoted as well as those who have been champions with the institution, including a mural with the image of Alexis Sanchez. The stadium also has a mural commemorating the historic players who have played for Cobreloa.

In 2024, a project began to be developed jointly with private companies, Aguas Antofagasta, AQUA4D and Cobreloa, in conjunction with the Municipality of Calama, which seeks to improve the water use of the stadium, reducing the use of water between 15% and 25% of what is usually used, through technology obtained from Switzerland.

== Other uses ==
In 1953, due to an earthquake that originated in the northern part of Chile, several families suffered damage, among which were citizens of Calama, which is why the stadium was used as a refuge center for 300 families who were affected by the natural disaster.

An important event occurred in this building on July 11, 1972, celebrating the first anniversary of the nationalization of the resource of mineral copper by and to the use of the Chilean state. At 1.00 p.m. on that day, people filled the stadium to be present at the symbolic act, starting with students of Chuquicamata and Calama waving flags of the country. After that, 214 miners who undertook volunteer work entered the precinct, and sang the national anthem. The trades union leader, Osvaldo Tello, paid tribute to fallen miners who had died to related to this cause, with a minute of silence. Then the match between Deportes El Loa and Colo-Colo, the team of Avionetas de Calama, made a spectacle to finish the event.

The stadium is home to various recreational and cultural activities, in which children participated in family races, yoga and Zumba sessions. In 2016 this stadium hosted the Campeonato Nacional Canadela, Senior category.

In March 2016, the local sport club called Los rebeldes organized a charity event to deliver non-perishable food to different organizations of the city. This event consisted of a football match between some players of Cobreloa in the 1980s decade versus Deportes Ovalle historic players. The requirement to enter the event was to donate a non-perishable food item to the cause.

On November 20, 2016, the stadium was host of the first final of the Bubble bump football tournament in Chile, called Fútbol burbuja Cup. The participants of this event were secondary students.

Since 2022, the public unit called 'Calama Culture and Tourism Corporation' has started an activity that is open to the community of carrying out tours within the enclosure. These are carried out throughout the year with prior registration to the said unit either in person or online.

The team from Calama, Eléctricos Refinerías, played in 2023 Copa Chile tournament in this stadium, faced Deportes Antofagasta, loses the match, valid for the regional stage of this competition.

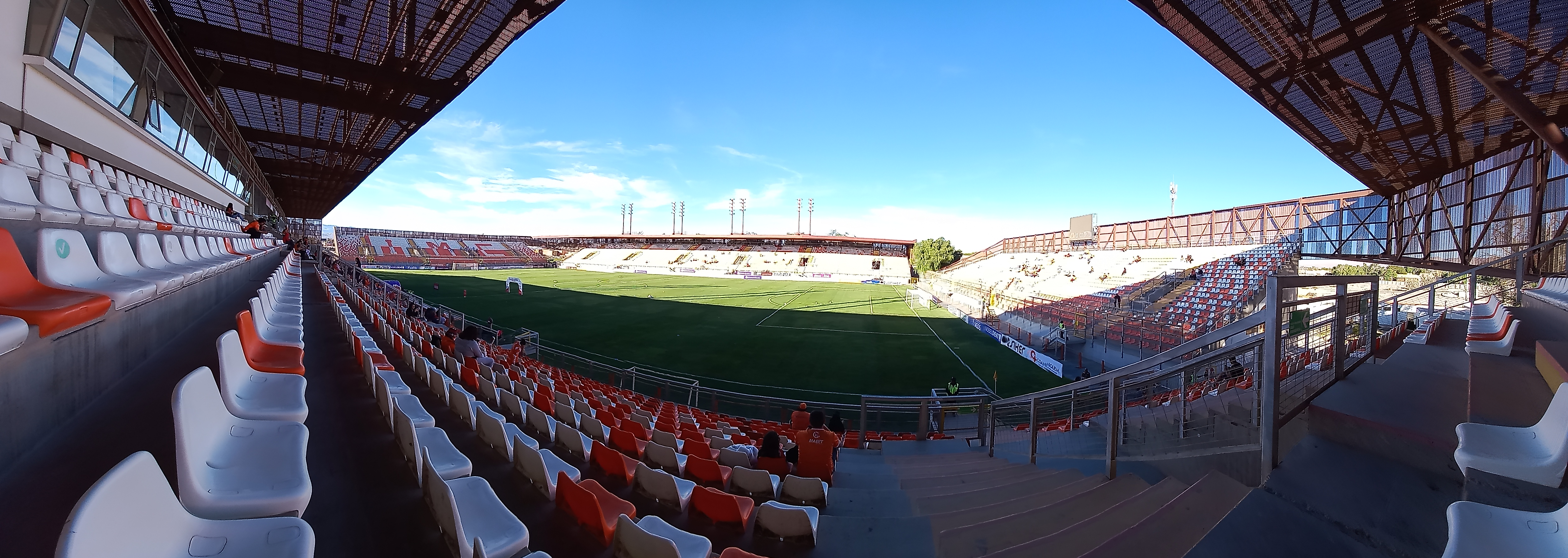
Panoramic view of Estadio Zorros del Desierto from Pácifico Stand in 2025.

== Facilities ==
=== Stands ===
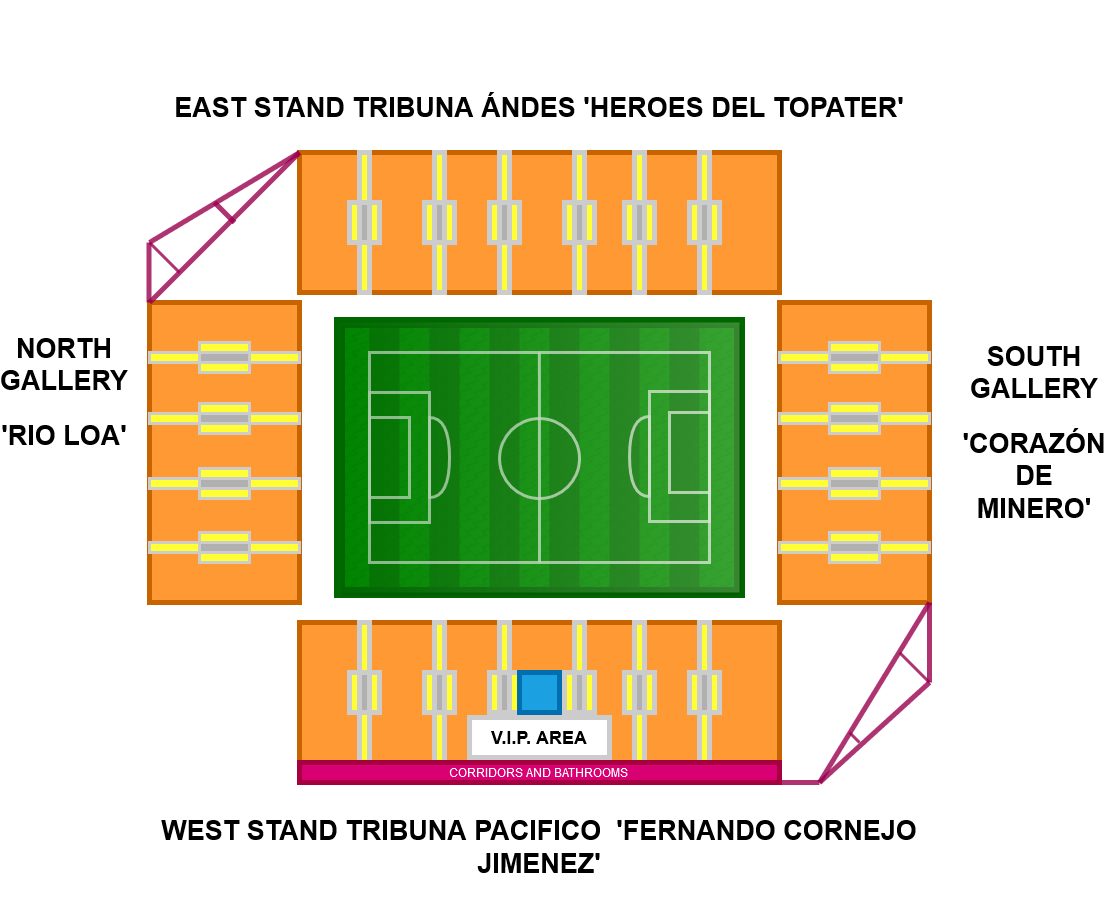
A plain of the stadium, describes each area of this

==== West Stand Tribuna Pácifico 'Fernando Cornejo Jiménez'. ====
Capacity: 2,772 seatings
The west stand of the stadium was named in honor of the former captain of Cobreloa, Fernando Cornejo Jiménez. This player, with the Cobreloa team, won the Chilean Championships four times, in 1992, 2003 (A), 2003 (C) and 2004. He played in the Chile national football team. He participated in the 1998 FIFA World Cup in France.

After his retirement, he became the football manager of the youth Cobreloa team. He died in 2009 from gastric cancer.

This stand has 3 sections, including 214 VIP seats. The press stands and the snacks shop sector are located over this stand.

==== South Gallery 'Corazón de Minero'. ====
Capacity: 2,674 seatings
This gallery was named in honor of the nickname of Fernando Cornejo, 'Corazón de Minero'. In a poll held in Calama, this was the third option in a communal poll to decide the name of the stadium.

He played for Ohiggins de Rancagua and Cobreloa. The nickname has been used since 1992, when Radio Carillon broadcaster Epifanio Carle Alcayaga used it. The reason for his nickname was the great identification he had with the area of Calama and the miners.

Cobreloa supporters called 'Huracán Naranja' sit in this gallery.

The LED Screen is located in this gallery.

==== East Stand Tribuna Ándes 'Héroes del Topater' ====
Capacity: 3,948 seatings
This stand was named in honor of the Chilean soldiers who fought and died in the Battle of Topater, fought in Calama on March 23, 1879, starting the Guerra del Pacifico. This event is celebrated by the city of Calama as the day of annexation of the city to the Chilean territory. The Topater Monolith remembers the fallen heroes of this battle. Cobreloa fans sit in this gallery.

==== North Gallery: 'Río Loa' ====
Capacity: 2,758 seatings
This stand was named in honor of the Loa River, the longest river in Chile. It crosses the city of Calama. It is the livelihood for indigenous communities of Atacama. Visiting team supporters sit in this gallery.

=== Facilities ===
- Press Room 'Mario Lira Solas': Named in honor of the social communicator and former councilor of Calama, born in Chuquicamata (1953–2013), Mario Lira Solas. He worked as a press correspondent for Cobreloa. He was also a municipal official.
- Utility Room 'Luis Becerra Constanzo': Named in honor of a stagehand of Cobreloa, who worked with the club for over 20 years (1981–2011). His ashes were scattered on the floor of the Estadio Municipal de Calama, at a ceremony where hundreds of people participated.
- Press Stands 'Alfredo Llewellyn Bustos': Named in honor of the social communicator who was a well-known fan of Cobreloa.
- 2 Professional dressing rooms
- 2 Amateur dressing rooms
- 8 radio stands and 2 TV stands
- 634 m^{2} of snack shops
- 753 m^{2} of general public bathrooms
- Possibility space for museum and fan shop: 133,113 m^{2}
- 4,434 m^{2} of stadium roofing
- 28 m^{2} of LED screen
- 105×68 m. Dimension field with natural grass and irrigation technology

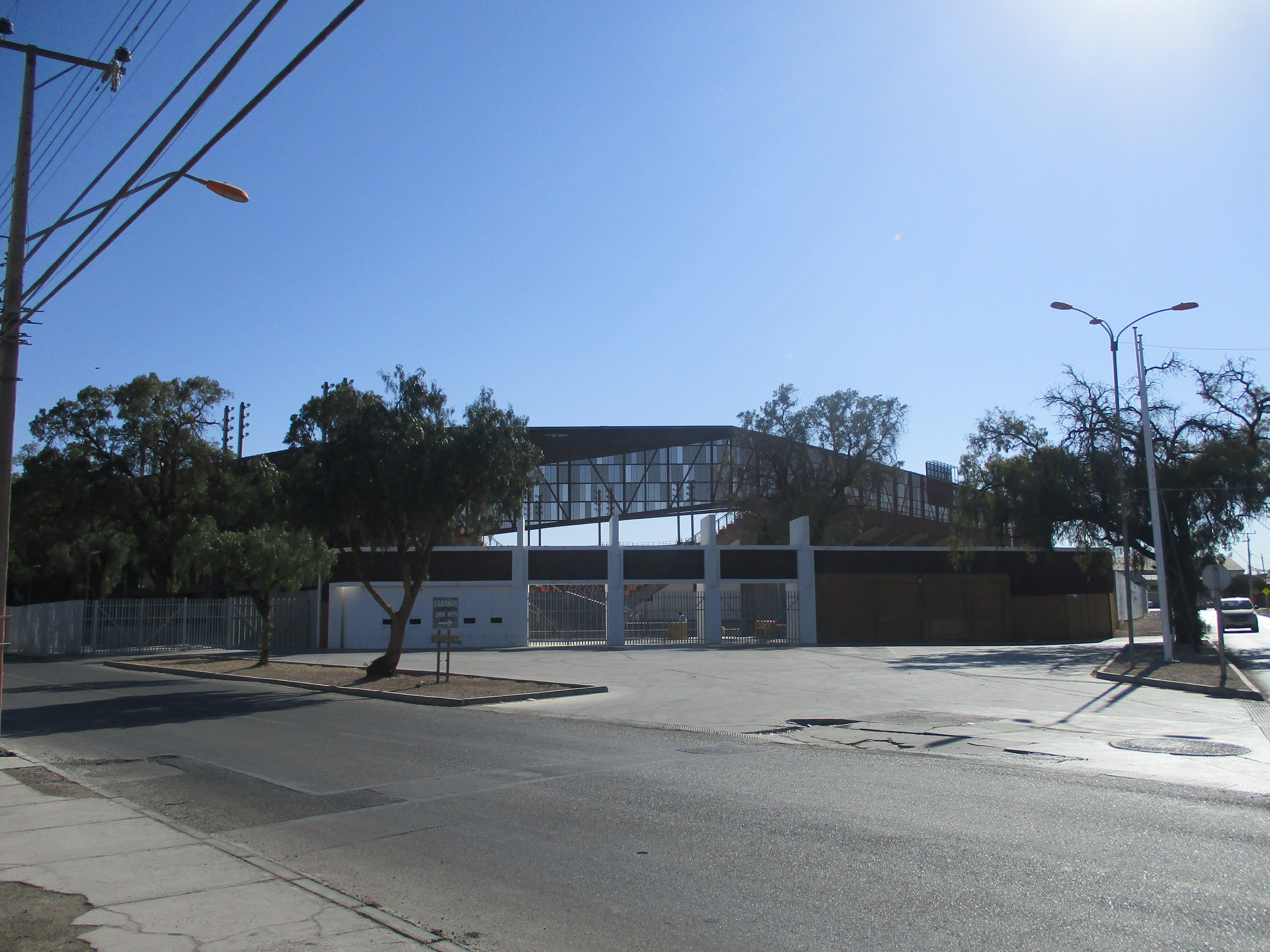
Front of the Stadium.

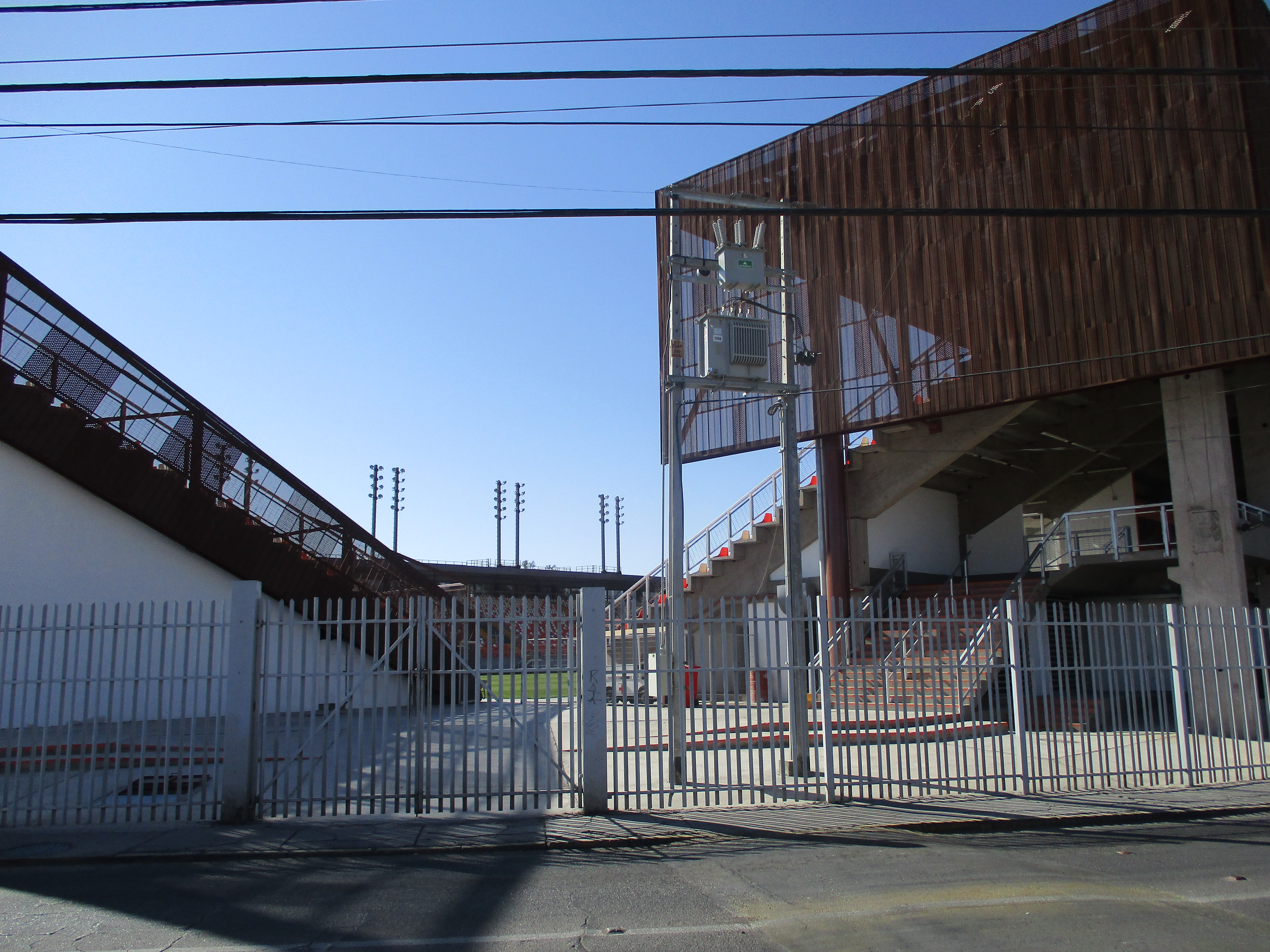
Side from Matta Avenue of the Stadium.

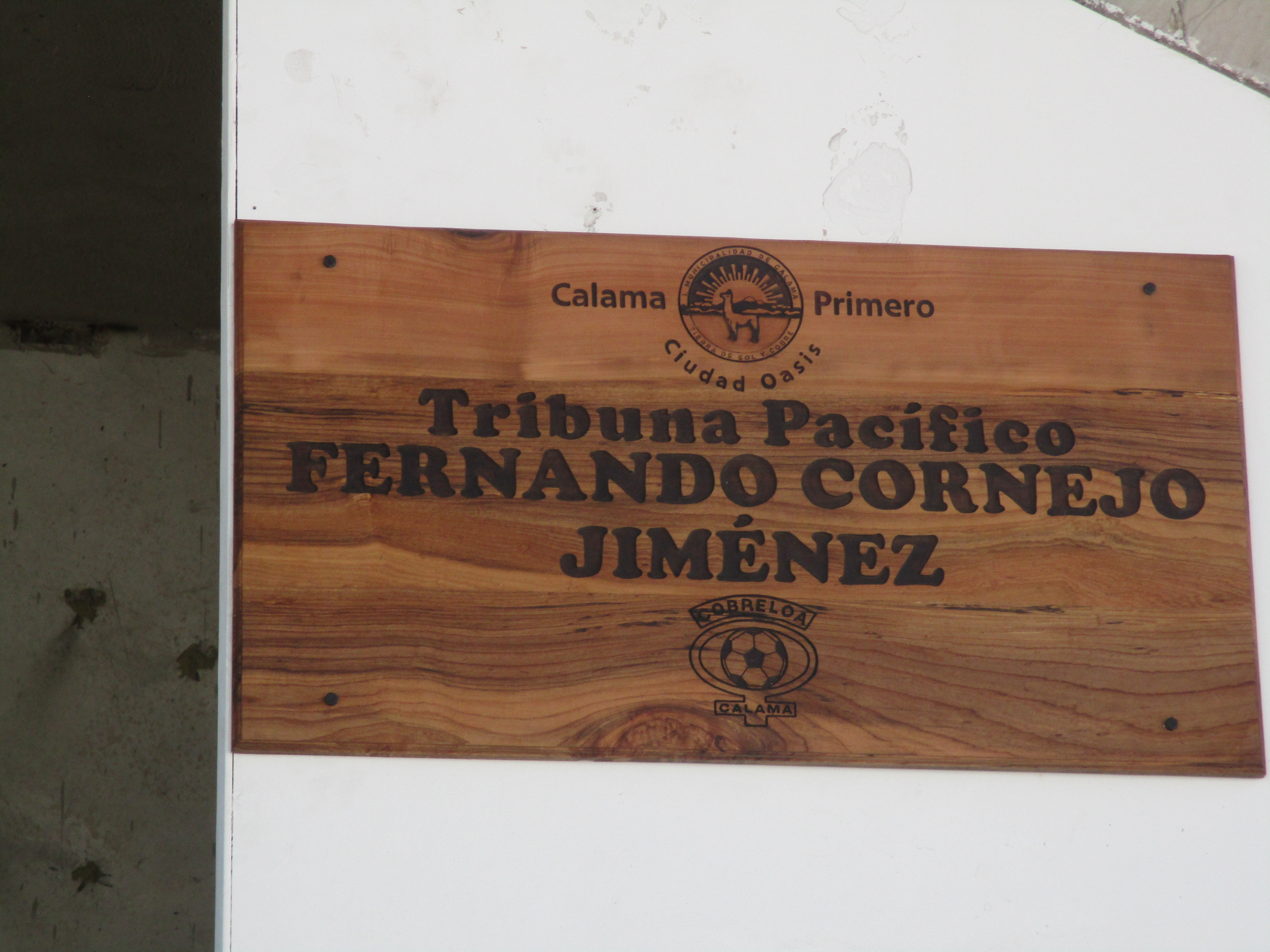
Memorial plate of Tribuna Pácifico.

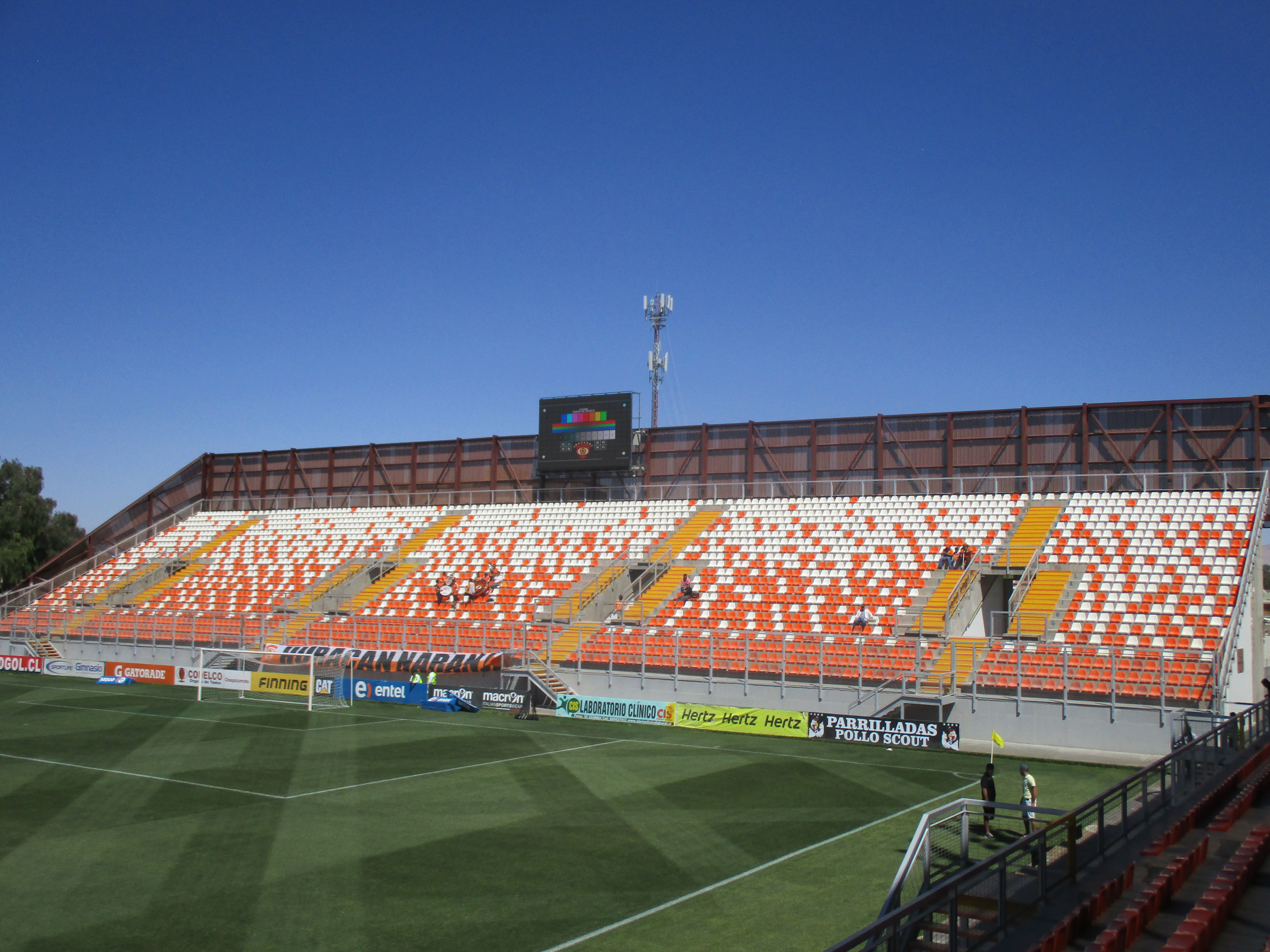
South Gallery of Zorros del Desierto.

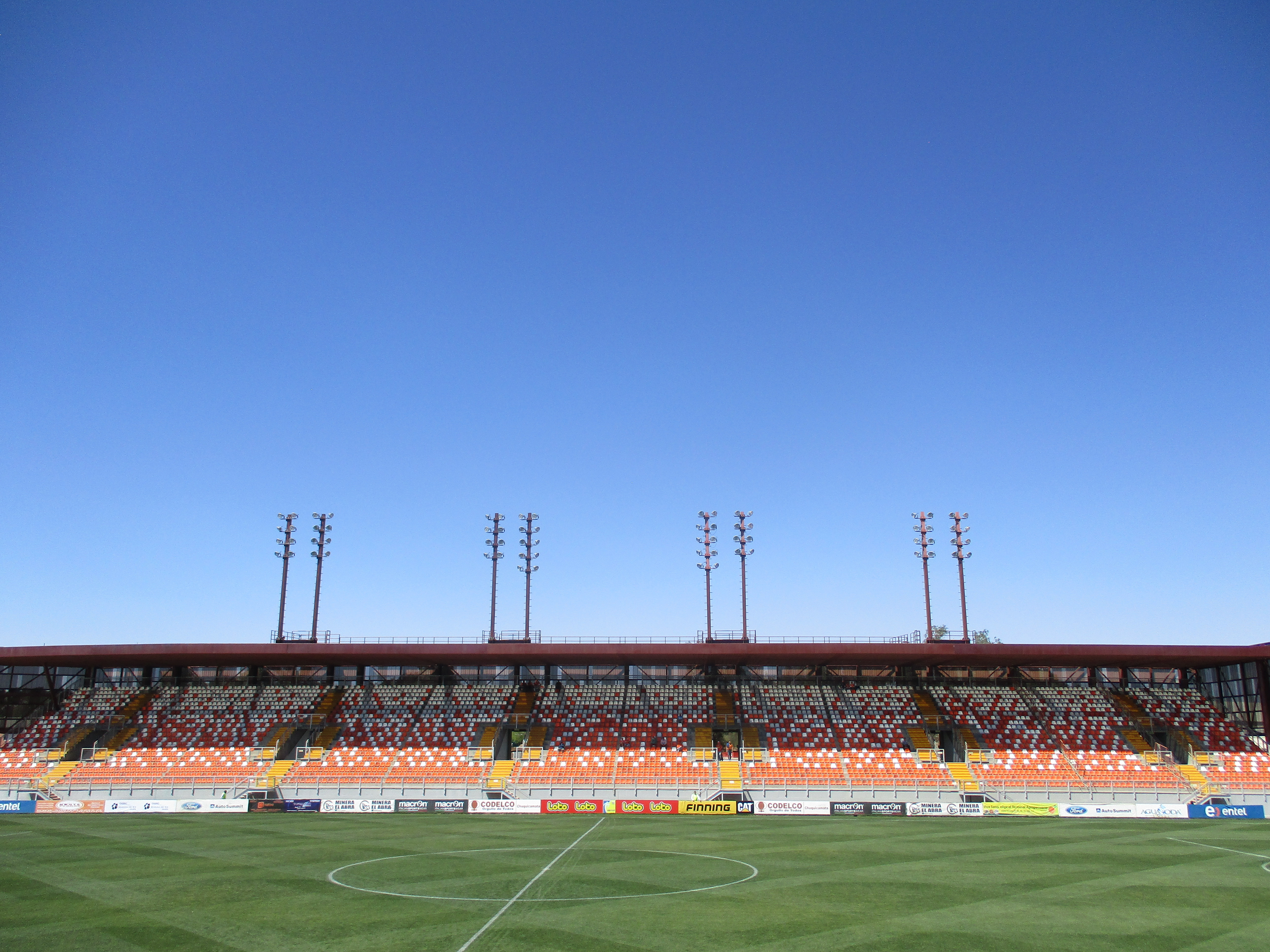
Ándes Stand of Zorros del Desierto.

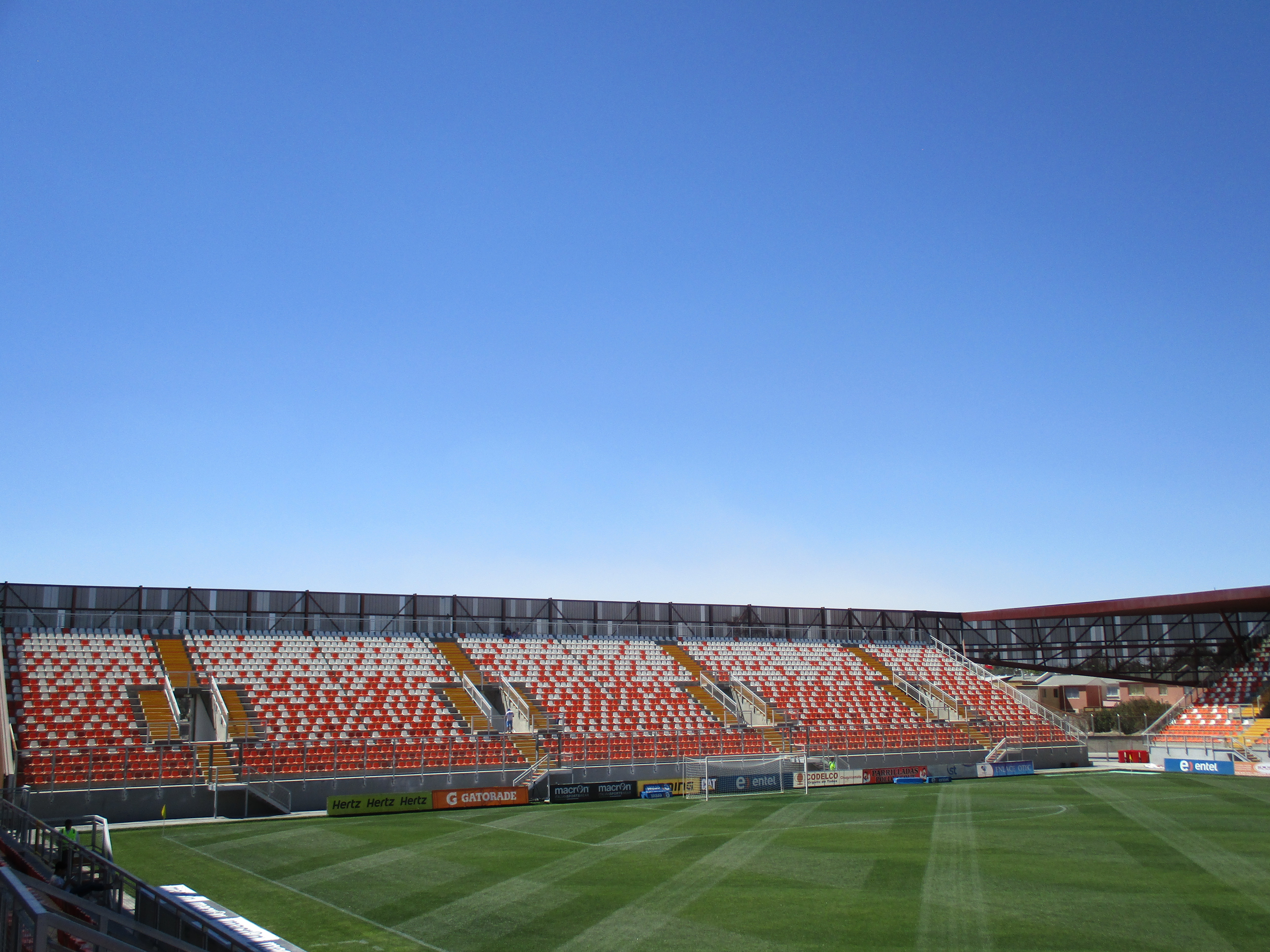
North Gallery of Zorros del Desierto.

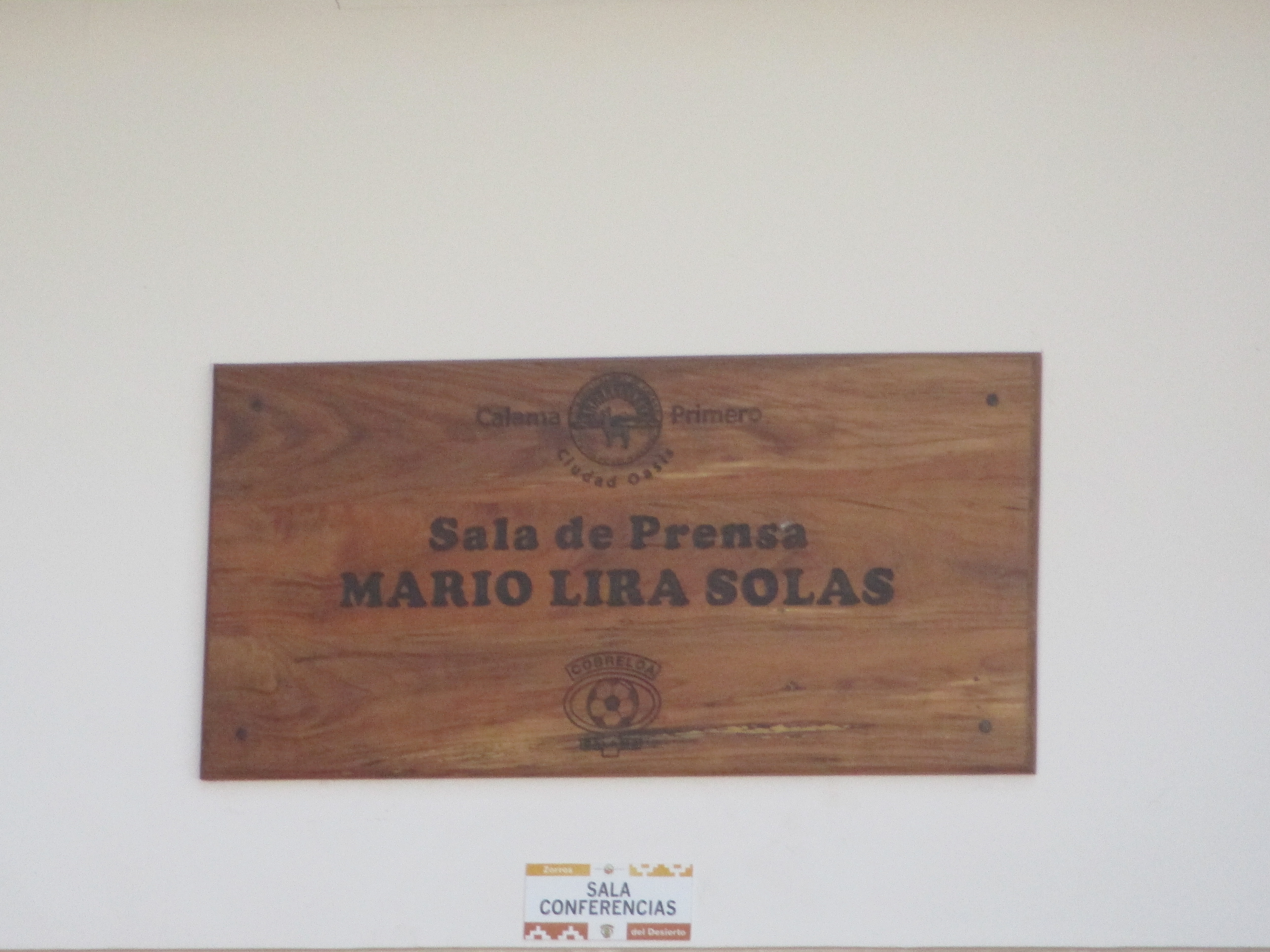
Memorial plate of the press room.

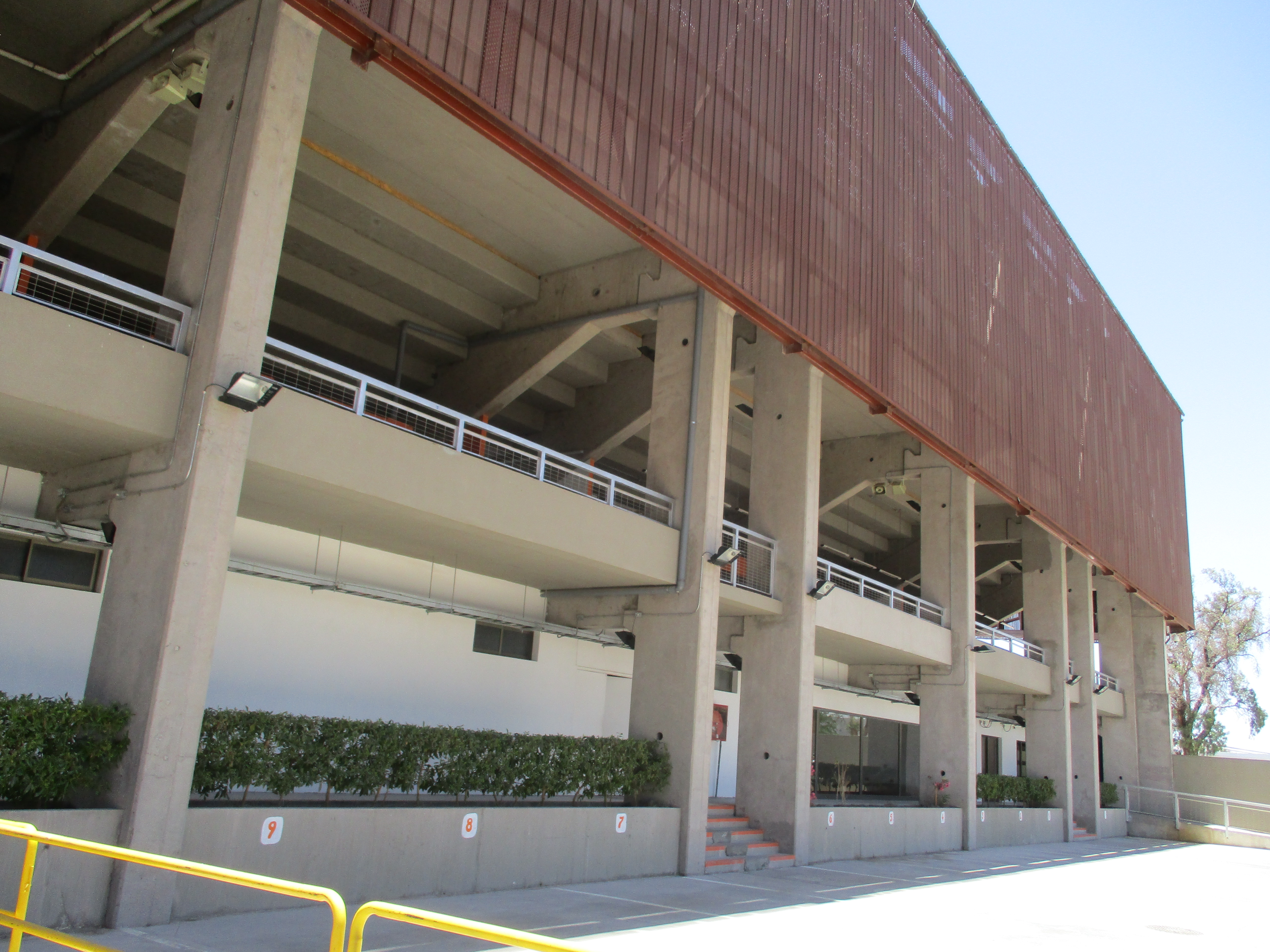
Parking Area.

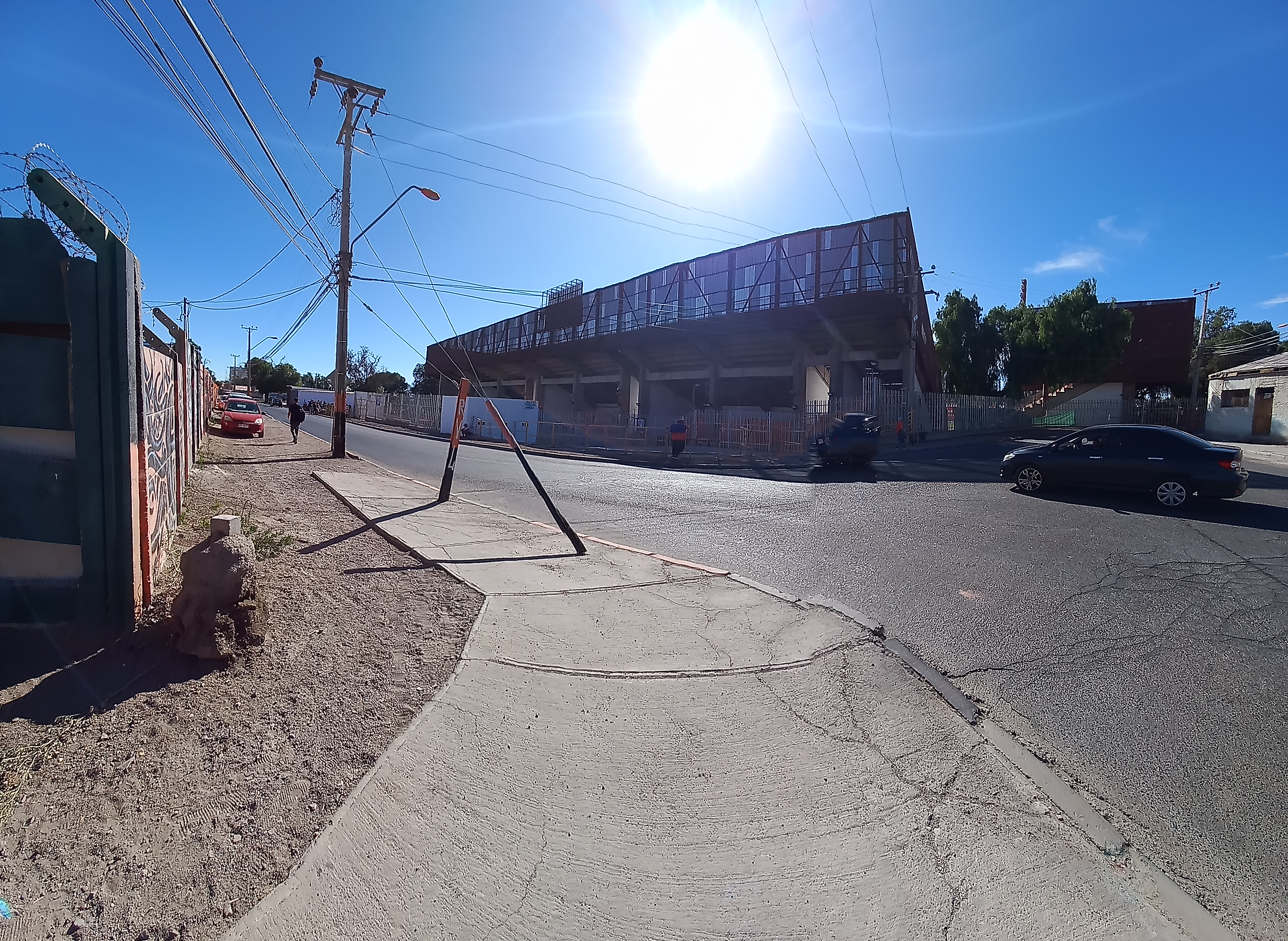
Panoramic view of Andes and South Stand entrance.

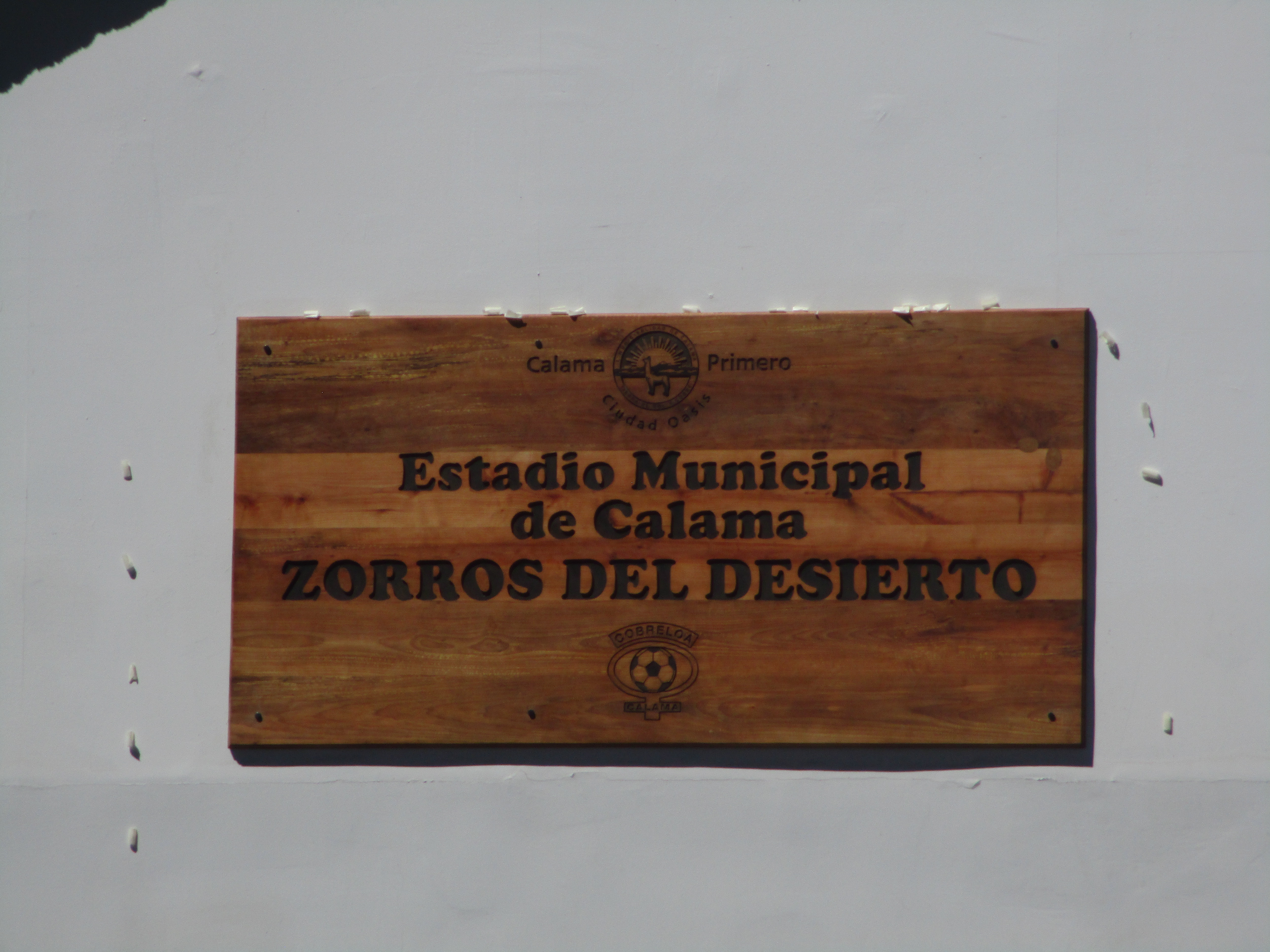
Main plate of the Stadium, 2016.

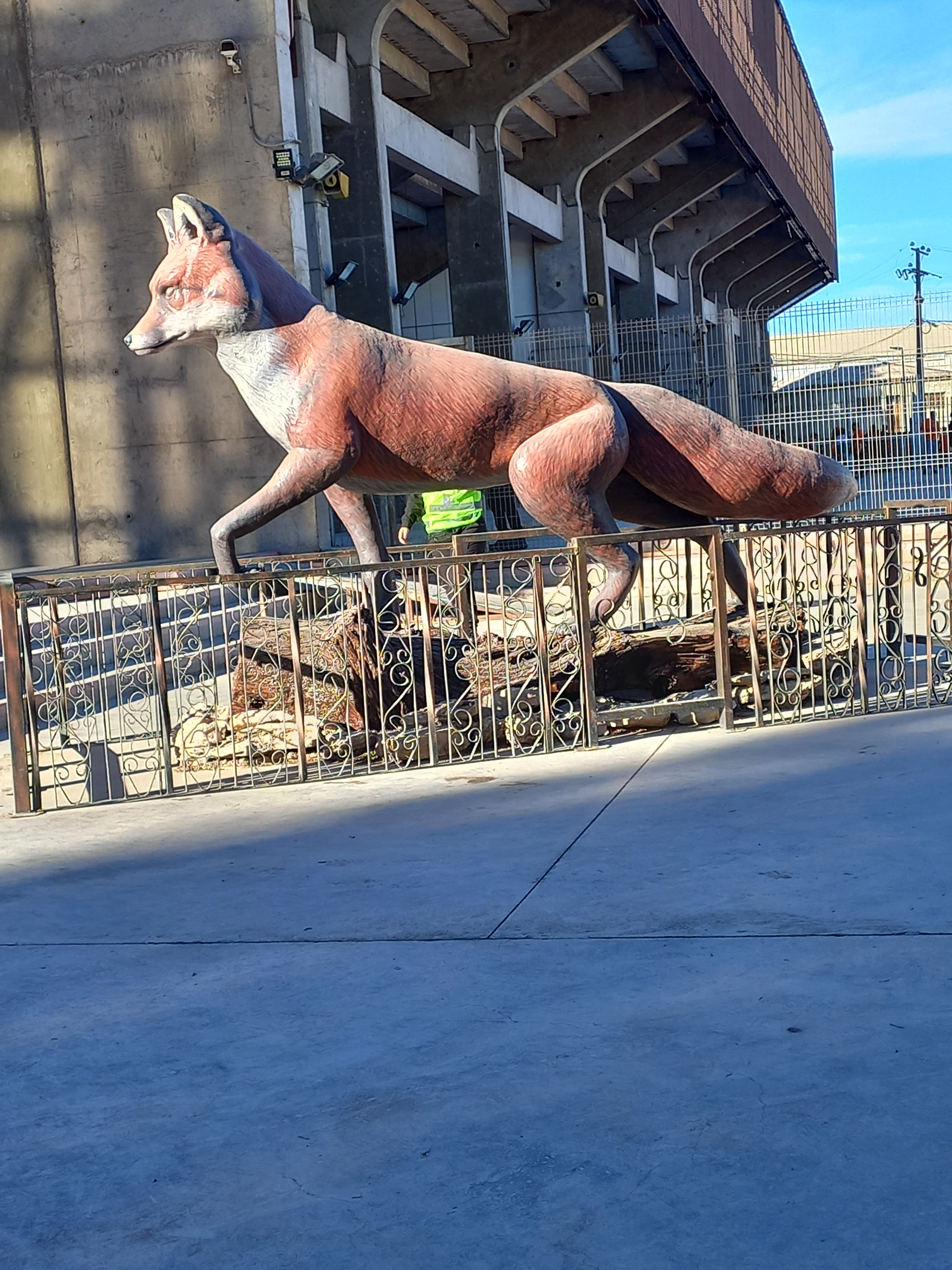
Statue of a fox in the Pácifico Stand entrance.

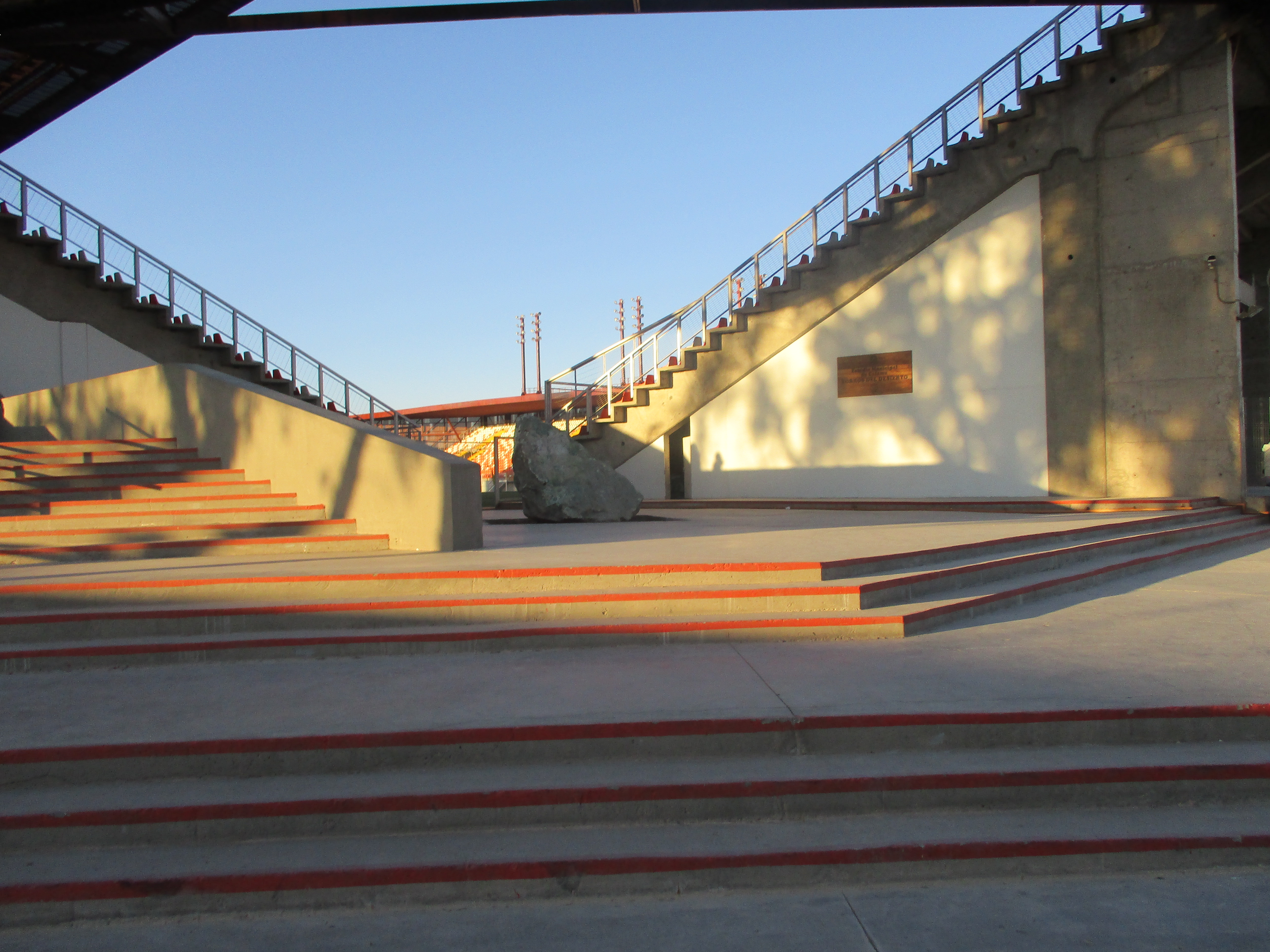
Monolithic rock of the Estadio Zorros del Desierto in Pácifico Stand entrance, 2016.

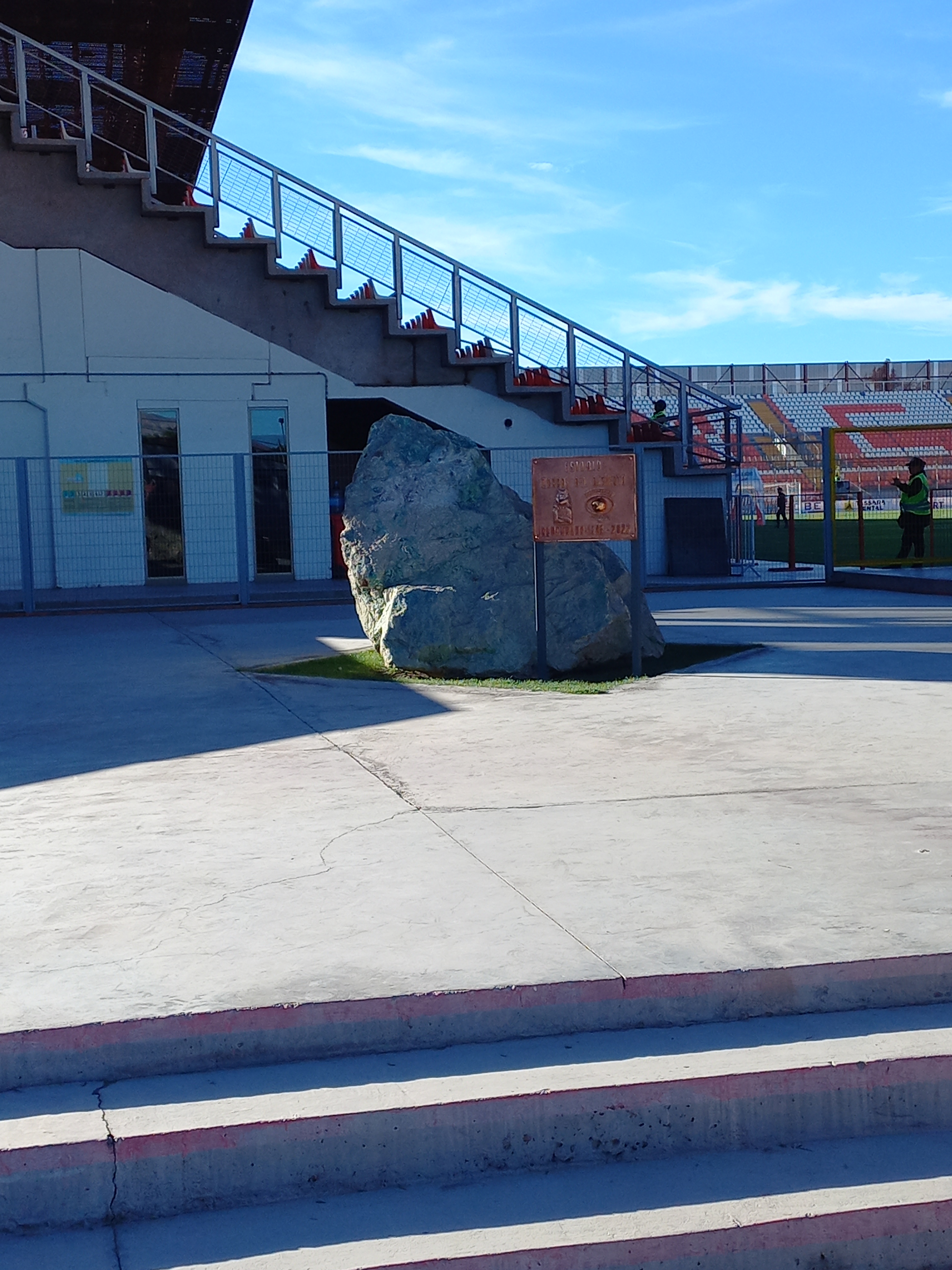
Monolithic rock of the Estadio Zorros del Desierto in Pácifico Stand entrance on 2025.

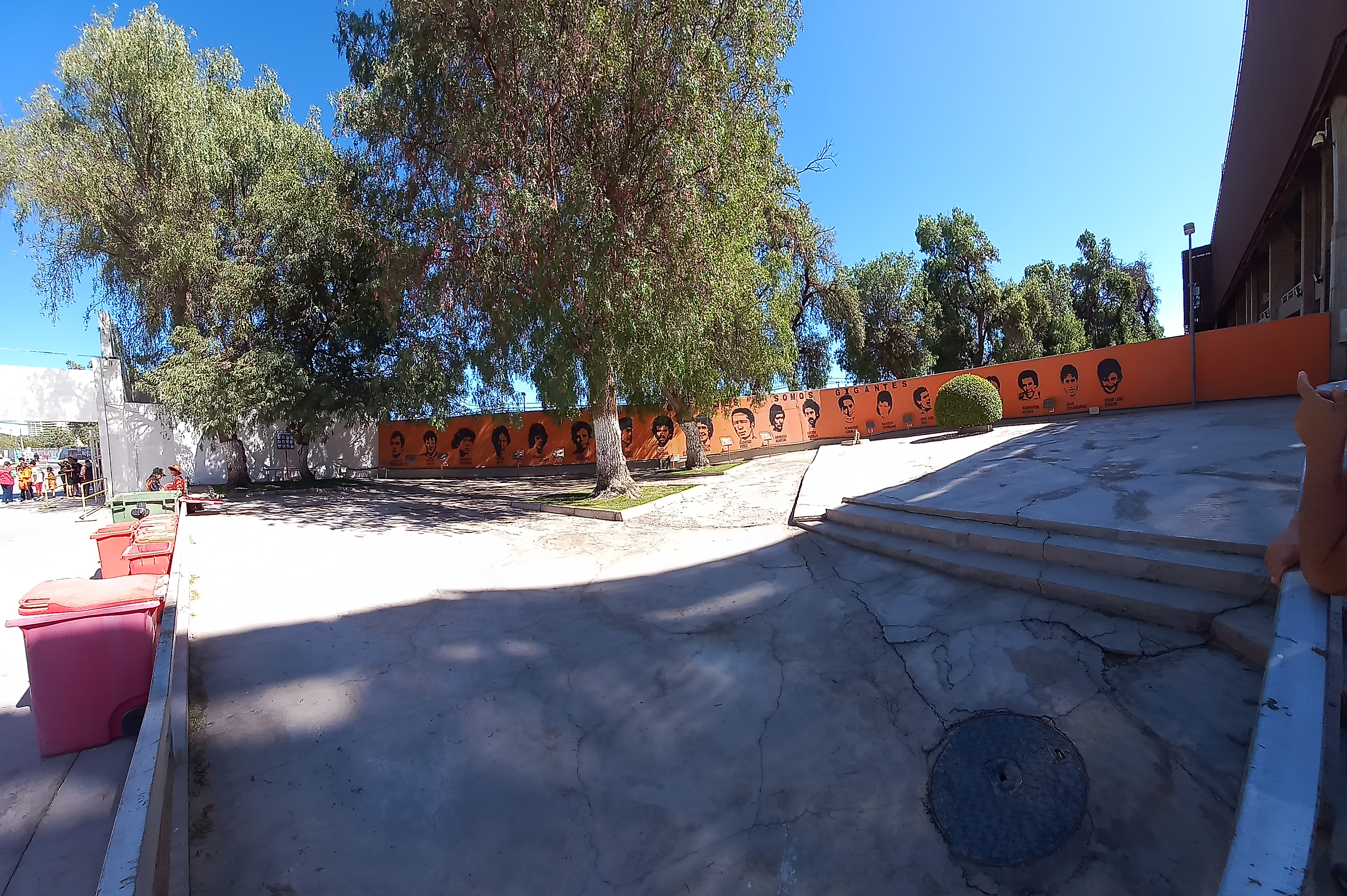
View of the Hall Of Fame stand in the Estadio Zorros del Desierto.

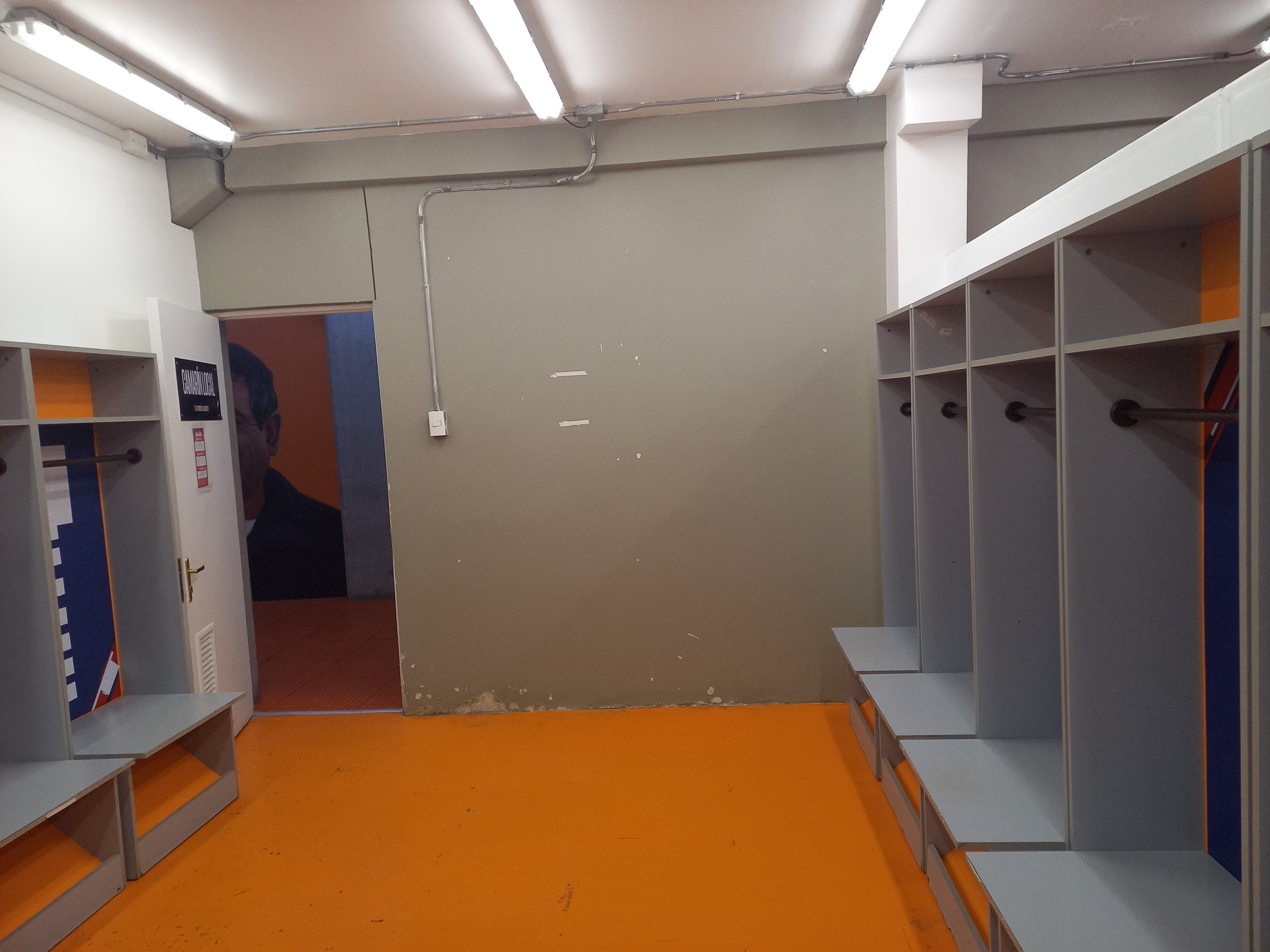
Local professional dressing room in the Estadio Zorros del Desierto.

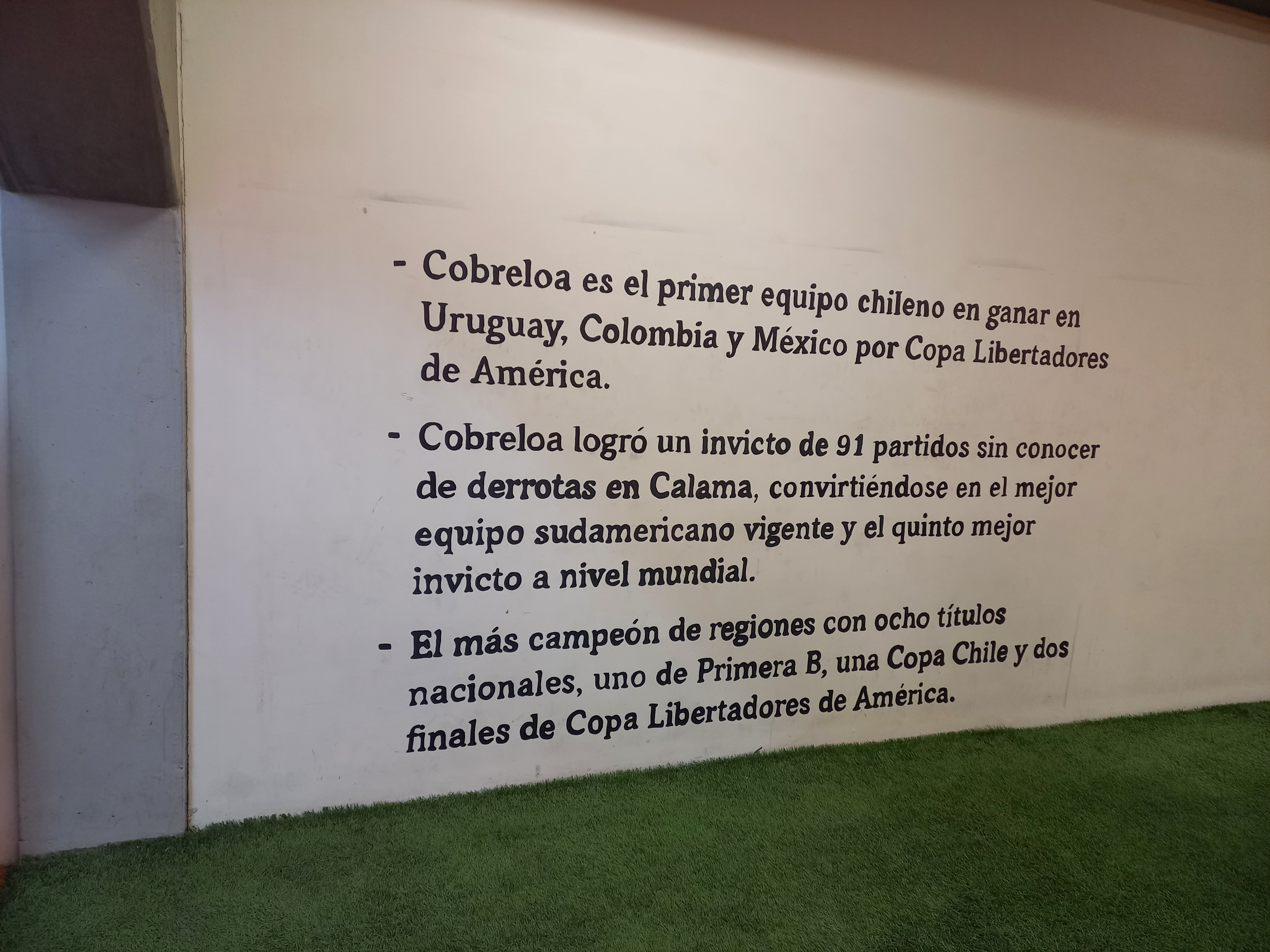
One of the walls of the rival professional dressing rooms in the Estadio Zorros del Desierto.

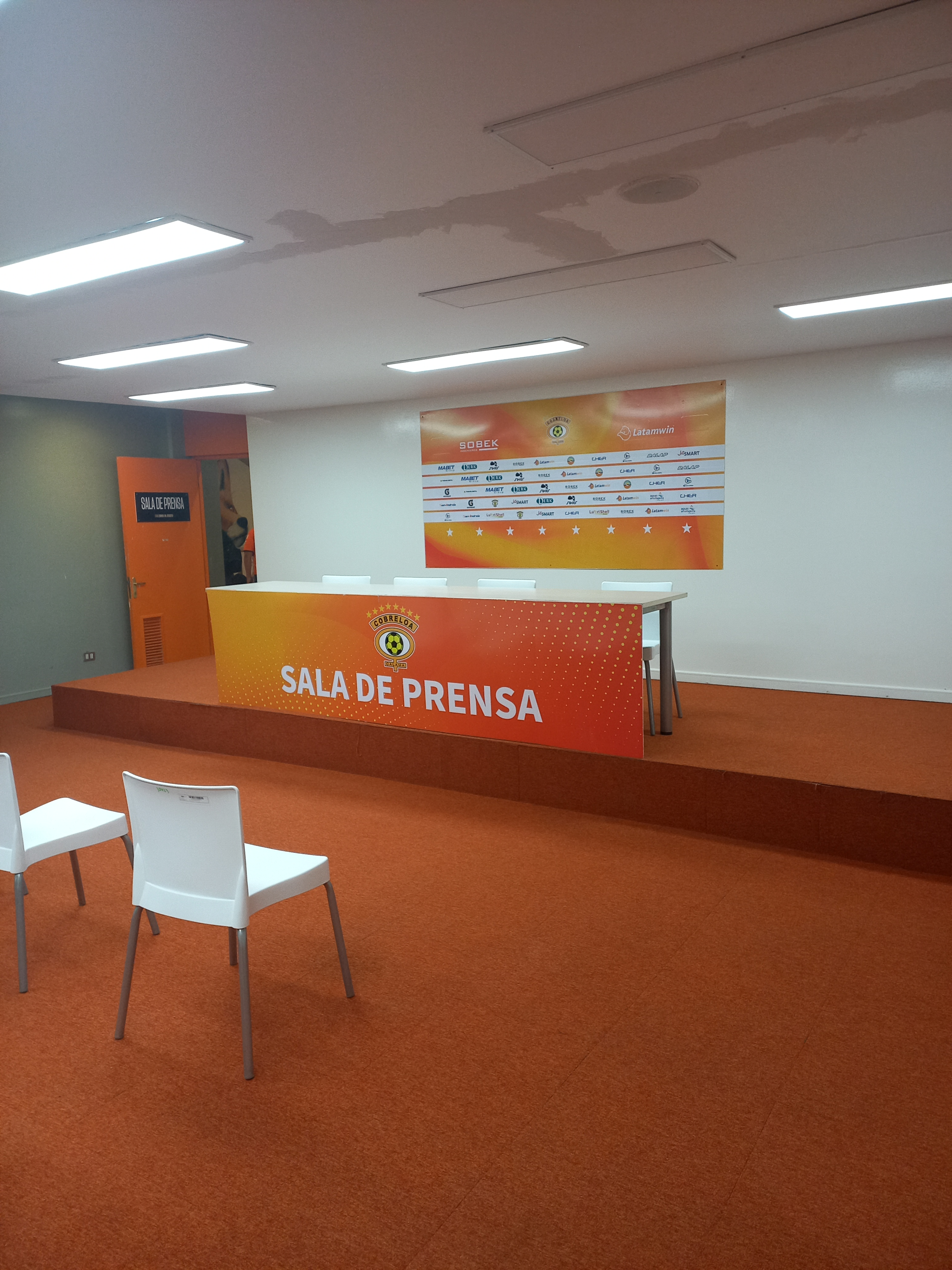
Conference room in the Estadio Zorros del Desierto.

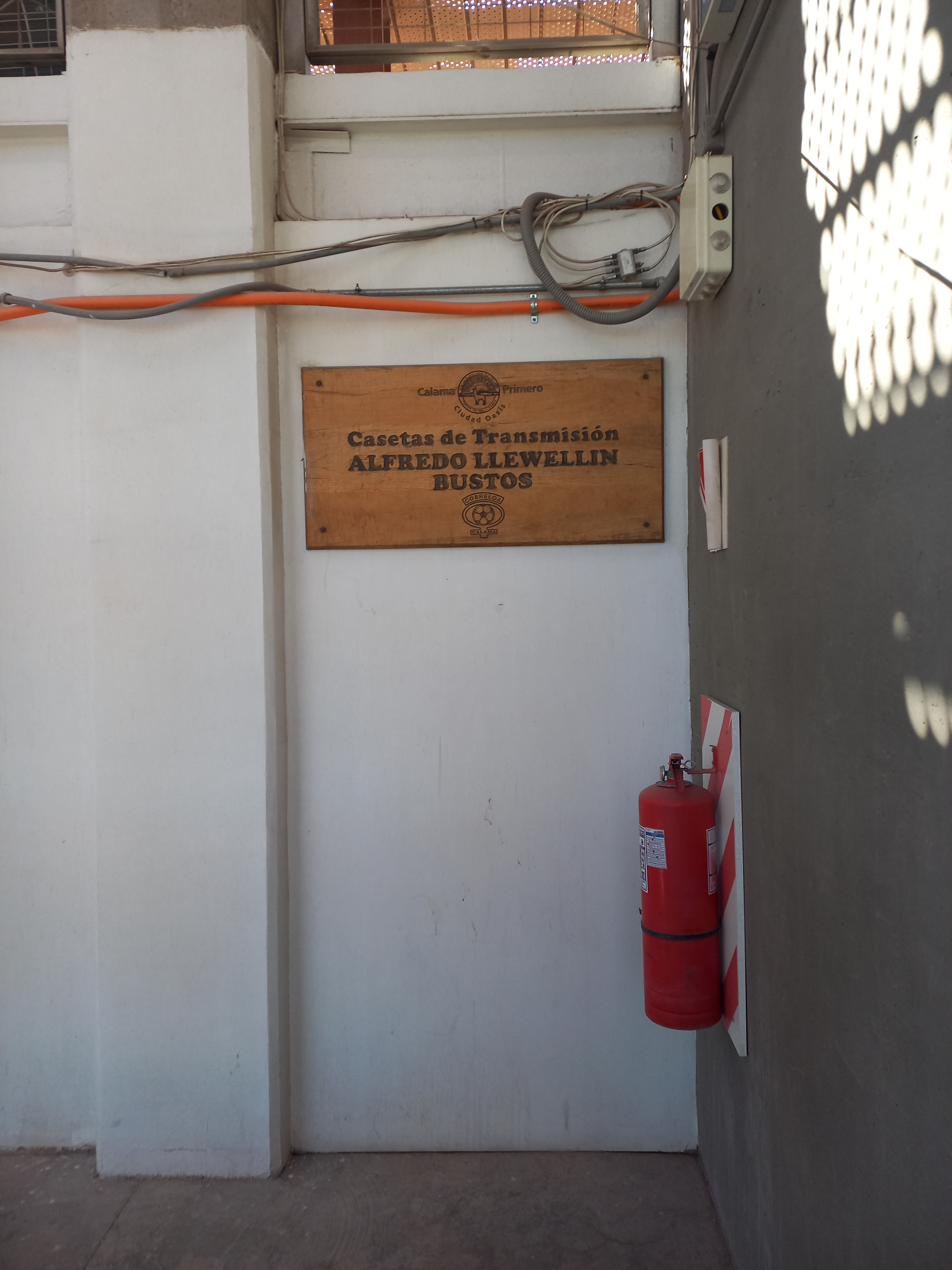
The press stand for the radio and television in the Estadio Zorros del Desierto.

== Records ==
=== Cobreloa ===
Competition	Average	Min.	Max.	% Sold	References
2015–16 Primera B de Chile	2,983	2,326	3,924	25%	
2015 Copa Chile	2,357	1,981	2,923	20%	
2016–17 Primera B de Chile	2,306	986	2,983	19%	
2017 Primera B de Chile	3,679	2,360	4,952	31%	
2018 Primera B de Chile	3,914	2,387	6,734	33%	
2019 Primera B de Chile	4,179	3,386	6,577	35%	
2020 Primera B de Chile	631	0 (Note: No attendance due to the COVID 19 pandemic.)	4,710	5%	
2021 Primera B de Chile	1,020	0 (Note: No attendance due to the COVID 19 pandemic.)	2,963	9%	
2022 Primera B de Chile	4,385	0	10,583	37%	
2023 Primera B de Chile	4,398	2,678	7,986	37%	
2024 Chilean Primera División	5,585	4,332	8,812	47%	
2025 Primera B de Chile	3,677	2,506	11,750	30,4%	

== Transport and access ==
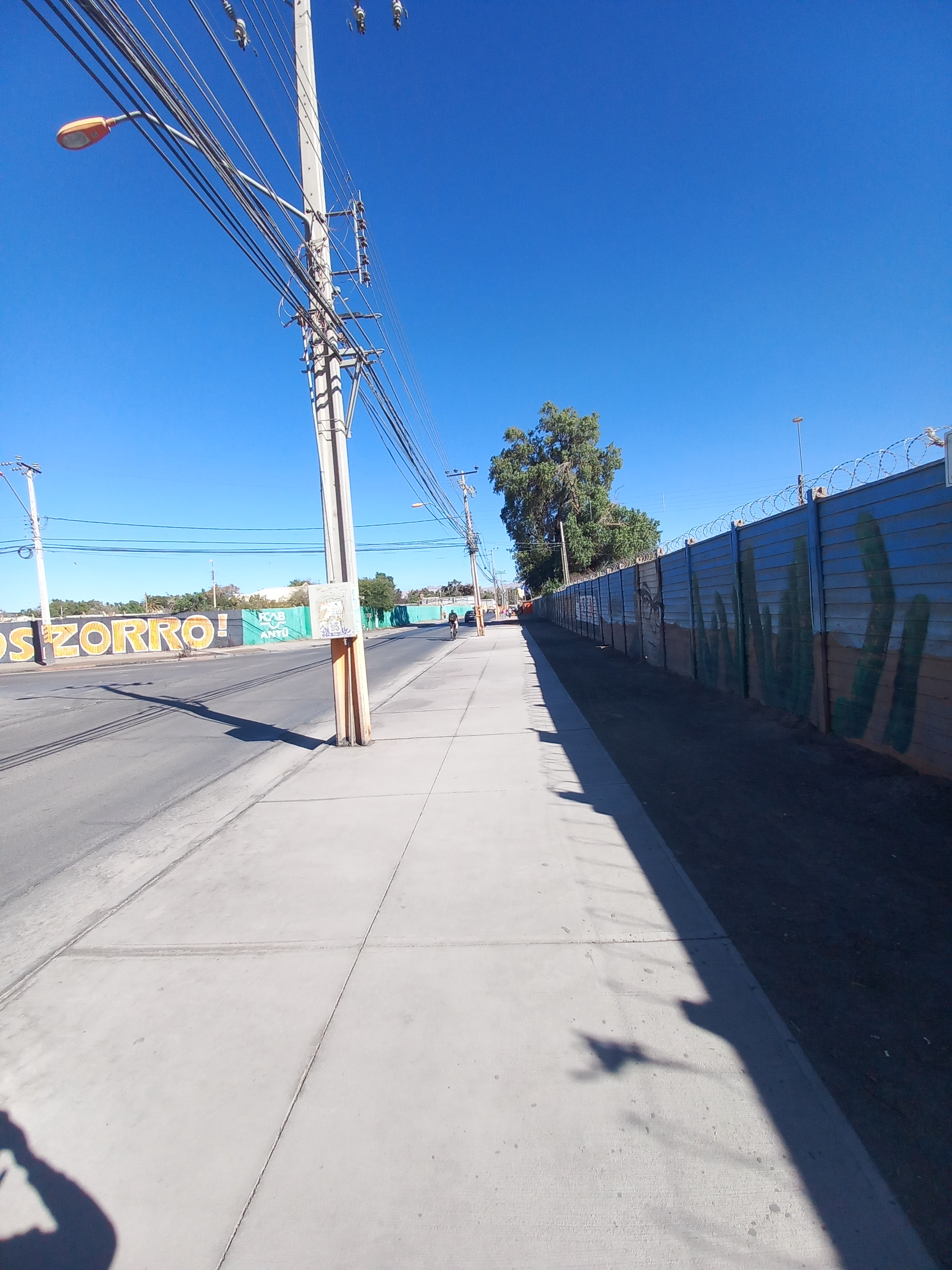
A view of Avenida Matta and the stadium surroundings.

The stadium is accessible on the city transit bus, more specifically the bus line 'Empresa de Transporte Publico Linea 177 Calama' in its '177-fe' service, which also operates during holidays, going through Avenida Matta, located in the northeast sector of the city, near Calle Bilbao.

Other of the available lines to get to the stadium is the '177-C' which make the route a round trip, one way from Huaytiquina Avenue to Pedro León Gallo Street to Balmaceda Avenue arriving in Atacama Street and then passing to Matta Avenue. The return route of this line starts from Laguna Lejia Street Avenue to Licarayen Avenue. This make the same trip to arrive at Matta Avenue, excepting the last one coming from Ecuador Avenue instead of Pedro León Gallo Street.

It is possible to get from El Loa Airport to the stadium by taking the '177 C' line, from Licarayen Avenue, with Juan Soldado Street, the estimated trip is approximately 1 hour.

The stadium can be reached from the bus terminal on Granaderos Avenue by walking to Hernán Cortés Street and taking bus line '177 C', which stops on Matta Avenue.

== Sources ==
Documents

- Mondaca, Carlos; Ogalde, Juan Pablo (2012). "Historia y Memoria de la Comunidad Atacameña De la Banda Calama Norte de Chile siglos XIX y XX" [History and Memory of the Atacameña Community De la Banda Calama, Northern Chile, 19th and 20th centuries] (Book) (in Spanish). Calama, Chile: Fondo Nacional de las Culturas y las Artes.

Journal

- "Cronica: El pueblo estuvo de fiesta" [Chronicle: The town was celebrating]. La Nación (in Spanish). Chile. July 12, 1972.
- "Cámara de Diputados" [Chamber of Deputies]. La Nación (in Spanish). Chile. December 25, 1942.
- "Mineros del Cobre y Salitre "como tabla" con club El Loa" [Copper and Saltpeter Miners "on a roll" with El Loa club]. La Nación (in Spanish). Chile. March 3, 1971.
- "150 casas destruídas" [150 houses destroyed]. La Nación (in Spanish). Chile. December 8, 1953.
- "Chile quiere ir a Calama" [Chile wants to go to Calama]. Página 12 (in Spanish). Argentina. June 27, 1997.
- "Actos deportivos de la Semana de O'higgins celebran en Calama" [O'Higgins Week sports events celebrated in Calama]. Diario la Nación (in Spanish). Chile. August 16, 1948.
- "Hoy quedan clasificados 6 finalistas" [Today 6 finalists are classified]. La Nación (in Spanish). Chile. October 11, 1959.
- "Noviembre" [November]. La Nación (in Spanish). Chile. December 31, 1959.
- "Estadio de modernas características al servicio del deporte de la zona" [Modern stadium for sports in the area]. La Nación (in Spanish). Chile. February 13, 1960.
- "Emprestito para la Municipalidad de Calama" [Loan for the Municipality of Calama]. Diario la Nación (in Spanish). Chile. November 15, 1942.

Magazine

- Thousend, Nicolás (July 29, 2013). "Un estadio Inexpugnable" [An impregnable stadium] (PDF). Cámara Chilena de la Construcción (in Spanish). Chile.

Websites

- "Sentencia, causa: C-10229-2016". Poder Judicial de la Republica de Chile. Chile. June 19, 2018.

== See also ==
- List of football stadiums in Chile
- Club de Deportes Cobreloa
