= Adán Vergara =

Chilean footballer (born 1981)

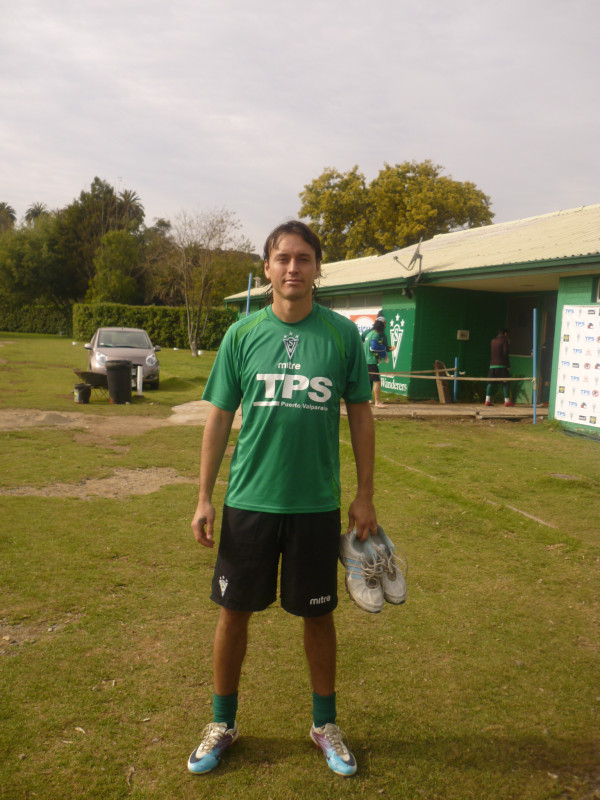

Personal information
- Full name: Adán Jonathan Vergara Villagra
- Date of birth: 9 May 1981 (age 45)
- Place of birth: Iquique, Chile
- Height: 1.88 m (6 ft 2 in)
- Position: Defender

Youth career
- Universidad de Chile
- 1993–1998: Cobreloa

Senior career*
Years	Team	Apps	(Gls)
1998–2004	Cobreloa	98	(23)
2005	Atlante Neza	18	(0)
2005	Vasco da Gama	9	(1)
2006–2007	Unión Española	43	(4)
2008	Zürich	15	(0)
2009	→ Luzern (loan)	5	(0)
2009–2010	Dalian Shide	25	(0)
2010–2011	Universidad Católica	15	(2)
2011	Santiago Wanderers	12	(0)
2012–2013	Mineros de Guayana	10	(0)
2013–2014	Ñublense	20	(1)
2014–2016	Deportes Temuco	9	(1)
2016–2017	San Antonio Unido	31	(2)
Total		310	(34)

International career
2001	Chile U20	1	(0)
2004	Chile U23	–	(–)

Managerial career
- 2018–: Cobreloa (youth)
- 2020–: Cobreloa (youth women)
- * Club domestic league appearances and goals

Adán Jonathan Vergara Villagra (born 9 May 1981 in Iquique) is a Chilean football player who currently plays for San Antonio Unido in Chile. He is an experienced and powerful central defender.

== Club career ==
Vergara started his career with Universidad de Chile in 1988. In 1993, he moved to Cobreloa where he had his professional debut in the first division in 1998. He played at Cobreloa, in the first division for six years, winning three Chilean Championships. He participated in five Copa Libertadores.

He first played outside Chile for Atlante. After this, he played the Campeonato Brasileiro de Futebol in 2005 with Vasco da Gama, in a team that also counted the national famous player, Romário, until end of season. He came back to Chile and played for Unión Española in 2006, he impressed with his abilities. In February 2008, he signed a contract with FC Zürich, beginning a career in European football. In 2009, Adan went to loan by FC Lucerne, also in Switzerland, to strengthen their defense. In 2009, after 2 matches, he received a propose to play in Asia with Chinese club Dalian Shide making it one of the Chilean players with more experience of the current. In 2010, he signed with Universidad Católica, in Chile. In 2011, he go to Santiago Wanderers and 2012 playing in Mineros de Guayana, Venezuela.

== International career ==
Vergara made his debut Chile National Team in 2001, in the 2001 FIFA World Youth Championship. He played many tournament in the National Team with U20 and U23 until 2004.

== Coaching career ==
He graduated as a football manager in 2017. Since 2018 he has worked in the Cobreloa youth system, being also confirmed as coach of the women under-17 team in 2020.

== Personal life ==
Vergara is married to Cherry de Paula, a Brazilian dancer who came to Chile along with his dancing group Porto Seguro at the beginning of the 2000s.

== Honours ==
=== Club ===
Cobreloa

- Primera División de Chile (3): 2003 Apertura, 2003 Clausura, 2004 Clausura

Universidad Católica

- Primera División de Chile (1): 2010
