= Fernando Cornejo (footballer, born 1969) =

Chilean footballer

- Cornejo with Chile national team

Personal information
- Full name: Fernando Andrés Cornejo Jiménez
- Date of birth: 28 January 1969
- Place of birth: Quinta de Tilcoco, Chile
- Date of death: 24 January 2009 (aged 39)
- Place of death: Santiago, Chile
- Height: 1.70 m (5 ft 7 in)
- Position: Midfielder

Youth career
- O'Higgins

Senior career*
Years	Team	Apps	(Gls)
1988–1991	O'Higgins	99	(9)
1992–1997	Cobreloa	82	(13)
1998–1999	Universidad Católica	36	(1)
2000–2004	Cobreloa	116	(21)
Total		433	(59)

International career
1991–2000	Chile	33	(2)
1998	Chile B	1	(0)
- * Club domestic league appearances and goals

Fernando Andrés Cornejo Jiménez (28 January 1969 – 24 January 2009) was a Chilean football midfielder. He died of stomach cancer on 24 January 2009, at age 39.

== Club career ==
He played domestically for O'Higgins, Cobreloa and Universidad Católica.

== International career ==
He was capped 33 times and scored 2 goals for the Chile national team between 1991 and 2000, including two games at the 1998 FIFA World Cup. In addition, he played for Chile B against England B on 10 February 1998. Chile won by 2-1.

== Personal life ==
He is the father of the professional footballers Fernando Cornejo Miranda and Lucas Cornejo.

He was nicknamed Corazón de Minero (Miner's Heart) due to the fact that he was a notable player of Cobreloa, a club based in Calama highly related with the copper mining.

== Career statistics ==
=== International goals ===
#	Date	Venue	Opponent	Score	Result	Competition
1.	15 December 1996	Estadio Monumental Antonio Vespucio Liberti, Buenos Aires, Argentina	Argentina	1–1	Draw	1998 World Cup qualification
2.	4 January 1997	Estadio Sausalito, Viña del Mar, Chile	Armenia	7–0	Win	Friendly
Correct as of 7 October 2015

== Honours ==
Cobreloa

- Primera División de Chile (4): 1992, 2003–A, 2003–C, 2004–C
