= List of 2007 Primera División de Chile transfers =

The following is a list of transfers for the 2007 Primera División de Chile season.

== Apertura ==
=== Antofagasta ===
In:

- (Chile) Pedro Reyes Transferred from (Chile) Unión Española
- (Chile) Cristián Reynero Transferred from (Chile) Huachipato
- (Chile) Alejandro Vasquez Transferred from (Chile) Everton
- (Chile) Carlos Ortega Transferred from (Chile) Cobreloa
- (Chile) Raúl Palacios Transferred from (Chile) La Serena
- (Chile) Roberto Castillo Transferred from (Chile) Everton
- (Argentina) Maximiliano Estévez Transferred from (Venezuela) Estudiantes de Mérida FC
- (Chile) Alejandro Osorio Transferred from (Chile) Universidad Católica
- (Argentina) Sebastián Cobelli Transferred from (Colombia) Deportivo Pereira
- (Palestine) (Chile) Hernán Madrid Transferred from (Chile) Universidad Católica
- (Guatemala) Pablo Melgar Transferred from (Guatemala) CSD Municipal

Out:

- (Argentina) Oscar Malbernat Manager Out to (Chile) Coquimbo Unido
- (Chile) Luis Flores Abarca Transferred to (Chile) Ñublense
- (Argentina) Gonzalo Klusener Transferred to (Argentina) Defensa y Justicia
- (Chile) Renato Ramos Transferred to (Mexico) Tecos B
- (Chile) Patricio Gutiérrez Transferred to (Chile) Unión La Calera

=== Audax Italiano ===
In:

- (Chile) Braulio Leal Transferred from (Chile) Everton
- (Chile) Rodolfo Moya Transferred from (Chile) La Serena
- (Chile) Jorge Lema Transferred from (Chile) Coquimbo Unido
- (Uruguay) Diego Scotti Transferred from (Uruguay) Montevideo Wanderers
- (Chile) Víctor Loyola On Loan from (Chile) Santiago Morning
- (Uruguay) Leonardo Medina On Loan from (Mexico) Chiapas

Out:

- (Argentina) Gustavo Paruolo Transferred to (Romania) Politehnica lasi
- (Chile) Luis Marin Transferred to (Chile) Lota Schwager
- (Chile) Mauricio Rojas Transferred to (Chile) Cobresal
- (Chile) Jaime Gonzalez Transferred to (Chile) Huachipato
- (Paraguay) Aristides Masi Retired

=== Cobreloa ===
In:

- (Chile) Esteban Paredes On Loan from (Chile) Santiago Morning
- (Chile) Victor Osorio Transferred from (Chile) Coquimbo Unido
- (Chile) Jean Beausejour Transferred from (Belgium) KAA Gent
- (Chile) Luis Godoy Transferred from (Chile) Antofagasta
- (Chile) Rodrigo Perez Returns from (Peru) Alianza Lima
- (Chile) Pablo Bolados Transferred from (Chile) La Serena
- (Chile) Jhon Novoa Transferred from Alianza de El Salvador
- (Argentina) Cristian Rios Transferred from (Argentina) Club Almagro

Out:

- (Chile) Mauricio Aros Transferred to (Chile) Universidad de Concepción
- (Argentina) Daniel Fernandez Transferred to (Chile) Coquimbo Unido
- (Chile) Iván Vásquez Returns to (Chile) Universidad Católica
- (Chile) Boris Gonzalez Transferred to (Chile) Colo-Colo
- Sebastián Pinto Returns to Universidad de Chile
- (Chile) Albert Acevedo Returns to (Chile) Universidad Católica
- (Chile) Germán Navea Transferred to (Chile) Coquimbo Unido

=== Cobresal ===
In:

- (Argentina) Sebastián Aset Transferred from (Australia) Cooma Tigers FC
- (Chile) Gabriel Varagas Transferred from (Chile) Puerto Montt
- (Chile) Mauricio Rojas Transferred from (Chile) Audax Italiano
- Rodrigo Jara Transferred from Universidad de Chile
- (Colombia) Edison Fonseca Transferred from (Colombia) Deportes Tolima
- (Chile) Roberto González Transferred from (Chile) O'Higgins
- (Uruguay) Fernando Savio Transferred from (Uruguay) Rentistas
- (Chile) Alejandro Blanco Transferred from (Chile) Curicó Unido
- (Chile) Luis Mori Transferred from (Chile) O'Higgins
- (Chile) Marcelo Medina Transferred from (Chile) O'Higgins
- (Chile) Fabián Acuña Transferred from (Chile) La Serena
- (Chile) Baltazar Astorga Transferred from (Chile) O'Higgins

Out:

- (Chile) Elthon Troncoso Transferred to (Chile) Temuco
- (Chile) Manuel Ibarra Transferred to (Chile) Unión Española
- (Chile) Mauricio Tampe Transferred to (Chile) Santiago Wanderers
- (Chile) Jose Daniel Contreras Transferred to (Chile) Coquimbo Unido
- (Chile) Rodrigo Barra Transferred to (Chile) Ñublense
- (Argentina) Raúl Celis Sanzotti Transferred to (Chile) Deportes Concepción
- (Chile) Claudio Videla Transferred to (Chile) Rangers
- (Chile) Nelson Arriaza Transferred to (Chile) Municipal Iquique

=== Colo-Colo ===
In:

- (Chile) Rainer Wirth Signed from (Chile) Universidad Católica
- (Paraguay) Gilberto Velázquez Transferred from (Paraguay) Club Guaraní
- (Chile) Rodrigo Millar Transferred from (Chile) Huachipato
- (Colombia) Giovanni Hernandez Comes from (Argentina) Colón de Santa Fe
- (Chile) Boris Gonzalez Transferred from (Chile) Cobreloa
- (Paraguay) Edison Gimenez Transferred from (Paraguay) Club 2 de Mayo
- (Chile) Gonzalo Jara Transferred from (Chile) Huachipato
- (Chile) Juan Gonzalo Lorca On Loan from (Chile) Huachipato

Out:

- (Chile) Matías Fernández Transferred to (Spain) Villarreal CF
- (Argentina) Miguel Caneo Returns to (Argentina) Godoy Cruz
- (Chile) Alex Varas Transferred to (Chile) Universidad de Concepción
- (Colombia) Andrés González Returns to (Colombia) América de Cali
- (Chile) Alvaro Ormeño Transferred to (Argentina) Gimnasia LP
- (Chile) Mario Caceres Transferred to (Greece) PAS Giannina
- (Chile) Felipe Flores On Loan to (Chile) Club Deportivo O'Higgins
- (Chile) Cristobal Jorquera On Loan to (Chile) Ñublense

=== Coquimbo Unido ===
In:

- (Argentina) Daniel Fernandez Transferred from (Chile) Cobreloa
- (Chile) Felipe Flores Transferred from (Chile) La Serena
- (Chile) Rodrigo Paillaqueo Transferred from (Chile) Colo-Colo
- Johnathan Cisternas Transferred from Universidad de Chile
- (Chile) Germán Navea Transferred from (Chile) Cobreloa
- (Chile) Rodrigo Naranjo Transferred from (Chile) Everton
- (Chile) Jose Daniel Contreras Transferred from (Chile) Cobresal

Out:

- Rodrigo Rivera Transferred to Universidad de Chile
- (Chile) Gamadiel García Transferred to (Greece) Skoda Xanthi
- (Argentina) Gustavo Lorenzetti Transferred to (Chile) Universidad de Concepción
- (Chile) Carmelo Vega Transferred to (Chile) Puerto Montt
- (Chile) Felipe Muñoz Transferred to (Chile) Universidad de Concepción
- (Argentina) Gonzalo Garavano Transferred to (Venezuela) Deportivo Italia
- (Chile) Crsitian Leiva Transferred to (Chile) Huachipato

=== Deportes Concepción ===
In:

- (Argentina) Raúl Celis Sanzotti Transferred from (Chile) Cobresal
- (Chile) Luis Chavarría Transferred from (Chile) Huachipato
- (Chile) Miguel Ayala Transferred from (Chile) Rangers
- (Chile) César Rodriguez Transferred from (Chile) Lota Schwager
- (Paraguay) Jaison Ibarrola Transferred from (Paraguay) Nacional
- (Chile) César Rodriguez Transferred from (Chile) Lota Schwager
- (Chile) Mauricio Lagos Transferred from (Chile) Lota Schwager
- (Paraguay) Raul Roman Transferred from (Paraguay) Tacuary FC

Out:

=== Everton ===
In:

- (Chile) Jaime Rubilar Transferred from (Chile) Universidad Católica
- (Argentina) Diego Martín Guidi Signed from (Chile) O'Higgins
- (Argentina) Daniel Pérez Transferred from (Chile) Palestino
- (Chile) Fernando López Transferred from (Chile) Palestino
- (Chile) Joel Reyes Signed from (Chile) Unión Española
- (Argentina) Matías Urbano Transferred from (Chile) La Serena
- (Chile) Gustavo Dalssaso Transferred from (Chile) Rangers
- (Chile) Nicolás Núñez On Loan from (Chile) Universidad Católica
- (Chile) Fernando Martel Signed from (Peru) Alianza Lima
- (Chile) Juan José Ribera On Loan from (Chile) Universidad de Concepción
- (Chile) Johnny Herrera Transferred from (Brazil) Corinthians
- (Chile) Marco Olea Signed from (Chile) O'Higgins
- (Chile) Pedro Rivera Transferred from (Chile) Universidad de Concepción
- (Chile) Rodrigo Raín On Loan from (Chile) Universidad de Concepción
- (Chile) Felipe Soto Transferred from (Chile) O'Higgins

Out:

- (Argentina) Carlos San Martín Transferred to (Argentina) La Plata FC
- Emilio Hernandez Returns to Universidad de Chile
- (Chile) Frank Carilao Transferred to (Chile) La Serena
- (Chile) Roberto Castillo Transferred to (Chile) Antofagasta
- (Colombia) Juan Ramon Perez Transferred to (Colombia) Expreso Rojo
- Marco Estrada Transferred to Universidad de Chile
- (Chile) Joel Estay Transferred to (Chile) La Serena
- (Chile) Rodrigo Naranjo Transferred to (Chile) Coquimbo Unido

=== La Serena ===
In:

- (Argentina) Emmanuel Culio Transferred from (Argentina) Racing Club
- (Chile) Angel Carreño Transferred from (Chile) Palestino
- (Chile) Joel Estay Transferred from (Chile) Everton
- (Argentina) Gustavo Canales Transferred from (Chile) Palestino
- (Chile) Frank Carilao Transferred from (Chile) Everton
- (Argentina) Gastón Losa Transferred from (Argentina) Deportivo Español
- (Chile) Juan Quiroga Transferred from (Chile) Cobresal

Out:

- (Colombia) Carlos Asprilla Retired
- (Chile) Felipe Flores Transferred to (Chile) Coquimbo Unido
- (Chile) Carlos Tejas Transferred to (Chile) O'Higgins
- (Argentina) Matías Urbano Transferred to (Chile) Everton
- Yerson Opazo Returns to Universidad de Chile
- (Chile) Rodolfo Moya Transferred to (Chile) Audax Italiano
- (Chile) Pablo Bolados Transferred to (Chile) Cobreloa

=== Unión Española ===
In:

- (Chile) Manuel Ibarra Transferred from (Chile) Cobresal
- (Argentina) Sergio Gioino Transferred from Universidad de Chile
- Hector Suazo Transferred from Universidad de Chile
- (Paraguay) Crsitian Limenza Transferred from (Chile) Lota Schwager
- (Uruguay) Alejandro Acosta Transferred from (Chile) O'Higgins
- (Chile) Johan Fuentes Transferred from (Chile) Melipilla
- (Chile) Ruben Bascuñan Transferred from (Chile) Antofagasta
- (Chile) Claudio Calderon Transferred from (Chile) Ñublense

Out:

- (Chile) Manuel Neira Transferred to (Israel) Hapoel Tel Aviv
- (Argentina) Francis Ferrero Transferred to (Chile) Santiago Morning
- (Chile) Juan Pablo Toro Transferred to (Chile) Universidad de Concepción
- (Chile) Pedro Reyes Transferred to (Chile) Antofagasta
- (Chile) Patricio Almendra Signed to (Chile) Curico Unido
- (Chile) Luis Jara Returns to (Chile) Universidad Católica
- (Chile) Francisco Rojas Transferred to (Chile) La Serena
- (Argentina) Julio César Gaona Released
- (Chile) Roberto Ordenes Transferred to (Chile) Universidad de Concepción
- (Chile) Joel Reyes Transferred to (Chile) Everton
- (Chile) Raúl Arenas Released

=== Universidad Católica ===
In:

- (Chile) Iván Vásquez Returns from (Chile) Cobreloa
- (Chile) Albert Acevedo Returns from (Chile) Cobreloa
- (Chile) Willy Topp Returns from (Chile) Puerto Monnt
- (Chile) Cristián Álvarez Transferred from (Argentina) River Plate
- (Argentina) Esteban Fuertes Comes from (Argentina) Colón
- Rodrigo Valenzuela Transferred from Universidad de Chile
- Patricio Ormazabal Transferred from Universidad de Chile
- (Argentina) Hugo Morales Transferred from (Colombia) Millonarios

Out:

- Francisco Arrué Back to Universidad de Chile
- (Argentina) Juan Manuel Arostegui Transferred to (Italy) Salernitana Calcio 1919
- (Chile) Alejandro Osorio Transferred to (Chile) Antofagasta
- (Chile) Alejandro Gaete On Loan to (Chile) Coquimbo Unido
- (Chile) Patricio Aguilera On Loan to (Chile) Antofagasta
- (Argentina) Johnathan Fabbro Transferred to (Paraguay) Club Guaraní

=== Universidad de Chile ===
In:

- (Chile) Yerson Opazo Returns to (Chile) La Serena
- (Chile) Mauricio Pinilla Transferred from (Portugal) Sporting Lisboa
- (Chile) Sebastián Pinto Returns from (Chile) Cobreloa
- (Chile) Emilio Hernandez Returns from (Chile) Everton
- (Chile) Patricio Galaz Comes from (Mexico) Atlante F.C.
- (Chile) Joel Soto Transferred from (Chile) O'Higgins
- (Chile) Francisco Arrué Signed from (Chile) Universidad Católica
- (Chile) Jorge Acuna Transferred from (Netherlands) RBC Roosendaal
- (Argentina) Federico Martorell Transferred from (Peru) Coronel Bolognesi
- (Chile) Marco Estrada Transferred from (Chile) Everton
- (Chile) José Manuel Rojas Transferred from (Argentina) CA Independiente
- (Argentina) José Luis García On Loan from (Mexico) Monarcas Morelia

Out:

- (Chile) Marcelo Salas Retired
- (Chile) Luis Pedro Figueroa Transferred to (Argentina) Arsenal de Sarandí
- (Chile) Rodrigo Jara On Loan to (Chile) Cobresal
- (Chile) Nicolás Toro On Loan to (Chile) Cobresal
- (Chile) Hector Suazo Transferred to (Chile) Unión Española
- (Chile) Rodrigo Valenzuela Transferred to (Chile) Universidad Católica
- (Argentina) Nicolás Sartori Transferred to (Bolivia) Club Jorge Wilstermann
- (Chile) Patricio Ormazabal Transferred to (Chile) Universidad Católica
- (Argentina) Rodrigo Astudillo Transferred to (Brazil) America (RN)
- (Argentina) Sergio Gioino Transferred to (Chile) Unión Española

== Clausura ==
=== Audax Italiano ===
In:

- (Chile) Patricio Gutiérrez from (Chile) Unión La Calera
- (Chile) Nicolás Corvetto from (Chile) Coquimbo Unido

Out:

- (Chile) Jorge Carrasco Chirino to (Chile) Colo Colo
- (Chile) Rodolfo Moya from (Chile) Colo Colo
- (Chile) Roberto Cereceda from (Chile) Colo Colo

=== Colo Colo ===
In:

- (Argentina) Cristián Muñoz from (Chile) Huachipato
- (Chile) Jorge Carrasco Chirino from (Chile) Audax Italiano
- (Chile) Rodolfo Moya from (Chile) Audax Italiano
- (Chile) Roberto Cereceda from (Chile) Audax Italiano
- (Chile) Jose Luis Cabion from (Chile) Deportes Melipilla
- (Chile) Miguel Aceval from (Chile) O'Higgins (Loan return)
- (Chile) Eduardo Rubio from (Mexico) Cruz Azul (On Loan)
- (Argentina) Claudio Bieler from (Argentina) Atlético Rafaela
- (Uruguay) Gustavo Biscayzacu from (Mexico) CF Atlante

Out:

- (Chile) Humberto Suazo to (Mexico) CF Monterrey
- (Chile) Alexis Sánchez to (Italy) Udinese Calcio
- (Chile) Arturo Vidal to (Germany) Bayer 04
- (Argentina) Sebastian Cejas to (Argentina) Gimnasia LP
- (Chile) Jose Luis Jerez to (Greece) Panserraikos
- (Paraguay) Edison Giménez to (Paraguay) Olimpia Asunción
- (Paraguay) Gilberto Velázquez to (Paraguay) Olimpia Asunción

=== Everton ===
In

- (Chile) Alejandro Escalona from (Brazil) Náutico
- (Paraguay) Juan Esteban Godoy from (Paraguay) Rubio Ñú
- (Argentina) Patricio Pérez from (Argentina) Chacarita Juniors
- (Chile) Michael Barrientos from (Chile) Santiago Wanderers
- (Paraguay) Anastacio Vera from (Paraguay) Libertad
- (Chile) Roberto Reyes from (Chile) O'Higgins

Out

- (Chile) Juan José Ribera to (Chile) Universidad de Concepción
- (Chile) Rodrigo Raín to (Chile) Cobreloa
- (Chile) Pedro Rivera to (Chile) Coquimbo Unido
- (Chile) Nicolás Núñez to (Chile) Universidad Católica (End of Loan)
- (Chile) Fernando Martel to (Colombia) Atlético Nacional
- (Chile) Álvaro Villalón to (Mexico) Lobos BUAP
- (Chile) Daniel Pérez to (Argentina) Guillermo Brown
- (Chile) Fernando López to (Chile) O'Higgins

=== Huachipato ===
In

- (Chile) Iván Herrera from (Chile) Rangers de Talca
- (Argentina) Ignacio Don from (Paraguay) Club Nacional
- (Paraguay) Herminio Miranda from (Paraguay) 2 de Mayo
- (Chile) Alexis Delgado from (Spain) Villarreal B
- (Chile) Juan Abarca from (Spain) Villarreal B

Out

- (Chile) Manuel Faundez to (Chile) Deportes Valdivia
- (Chile) Cristián Muñoz to (Chile) Colo Colo
- Pedro Morales to Universidad de Chile
- (Chile) Nicolás Núñez to (Chile) Universidad Católica (End of Loan)

=== Deportes Concepción ===
In:

- (Chile) Patricio Almendra from (Chile) Curicó Unido
- (Chile) Clarence Acuña from (Chile) Unión Española
- (Chile) Alonso Zúñiga from (Chile) Antofagasta
- (Chile) Leonardo Monje from (Chile) Universidad de Concepción
- (Chile) Alejandro Osorio from (Chile) Antofagasta
- (Chile) Sebastián Montecinos from (Chile) Puerto Montt

Out:

- (Paraguay) Raúl Román to (Paraguay) Nacional (End of Loan)
- (Chile) Nestor Contreras to (Chile) San Luis Quillota
- (Chile) Miguel Angel Ayala to (Chile) Municipal Iquique
- (Chile) José Florentino Inostroza to (Chile) Deportivo Temuco
