= 2005 Campeonato Nacional Primera División =

The 2005 Primera División de Chile season was both 77th and 78th season of top-flight football in Chile.

== Torneo Apertura ==
Torneo Apertura
- Season: 2005
- Champions: Unión Española; 7th title
- 2005 Copa Sudamericana: Universidad Católica; Universidad de Chile
- Matches: 215
- Goals: 604 (2.81 per match)
- Top goalscorer: Joel Estay; Álvaro Sarabia; Héctor Mancilla (13 goals)
- Biggest home win: Cobreloa 5–0 Coquimbo Unido (13 May)
- Biggest away win: La Serena 3–7 Colo-Colo (19 February)
- Highest attendance: 58,000; Universidad de Chile 1–1 Colo-Colo (10 April)

The 2005 Torneo Apertura was the season's first tournament. Cobreloa was the defending champions.

=== Qualification stage ===
==== Group standings ====
Group A
| Pos | Team | Pld | W | D | L | GF | GA | GD | Pts | Qualification |
|---|---|---|---|---|---|---|---|---|---|---|
| 1 | Colo-Colo | 19 | 9 | 5 | 5 | 34 | 24 | +10 | 32 | Qualify to the playoffs |
| 2 | Huachipato | 19 | 10 | 1 | 8 | 31 | 28 | +3 | 31 | Qualify to the playoffs |
| 3 | Unión San Felipe | 19 | 5 | 3 | 11 | 16 | 26 | −10 | 18 | |
| 4 | Deportes Melipilla | 19 | 4 | 5 | 10 | 14 | 30 | −16 | 17 | |
| 5 | Audax Italiano | 19 | 3 | 7 | 9 | 22 | 32 | −10 | 16 | |

Group B
| Pos | Team | Pld | W | D | L | GF | GA | GD | Pts | Qualification |
|---|---|---|---|---|---|---|---|---|---|---|
| 1 | Cobreloa | 19 | 10 | 3 | 6 | 35 | 29 | +6 | 33 | Qualify to the playoffs |
| 2 | Coquimbo Unido | 19 | 9 | 2 | 8 | 29 | 27 | +2 | 29 | Qualify to the repechaje |
| 3 | Deportes La Serena | 19 | 7 | 5 | 7 | 28 | 35 | −7 | 26 | |
| 4 | Santiago Wanderers | 19 | 7 | 2 | 10 | 28 | 30 | −2 | 23 | |
| 5 | Deportes Puerto Montt | 19 | 5 | 3 | 11 | 30 | 36 | −6 | 18 | |

Group C
| Pos | Team | Pld | W | D | L | GF | GA | GD | Pts | Qualification |
|---|---|---|---|---|---|---|---|---|---|---|
| 1 | Unión Española | 19 | 7 | 5 | 7 | 32 | 31 | +1 | 26 | Qualify to the playoffs |
| 2 | Deportes Concepción | 19 | 6 | 7 | 6 | 20 | 21 | −1 | 25 | Qualify to the repechaje |
| 3 | Universidad de Concepción | 19 | 6 | 4 | 9 | 23 | 31 | −8 | 22 | |
| 4 | CD Palestino | 19 | 5 | 3 | 11 | 30 | 36 | −6 | 18 | |
| 5 | Deportes Temuco | 19 | 3 | 8 | 8 | 24 | 31 | −7 | 17 | |

Group D
| Pos | Team | Pld | W | D | L | GF | GA | GD | Pts | Qualification |
|---|---|---|---|---|---|---|---|---|---|---|
| 1 | Universidad Católica | 19 | 14 | 2 | 3 | 39 | 13 | +26 | 44 | Qualify to the playoffs |
| 2 | Universidad de Chile | 19 | 12 | 3 | 4 | 36 | 19 | +17 | 39 | Qualify to the playoffs |
| 3 | Cobresal | 19 | 9 | 5 | 5 | 32 | 25 | +7 | 32 | Qualify to the repechaje |
| 4 | Everton | 19 | 8 | 6 | 5 | 32 | 27 | +5 | 30 | Qualify to the repechaje |
| 5 | Rangers | 19 | 7 | 7 | 5 | 24 | 23 | +1 | 28 | |

==== Aggregate table ====
| Pos | Team | Pld | W | D | L | GF | GA | GD | Pts | Qualification |
|---|---|---|---|---|---|---|---|---|---|---|
| 1 | Universidad Católica | 19 | 14 | 2 | 3 | 39 | 13 | +26 | 44 | Playoffs |
| 2 | Universidad de Chile | 19 | 12 | 3 | 4 | 36 | 19 | +17 | 39 | Playoffs |
| 3 | Cobreloa | 19 | 10 | 3 | 6 | 35 | 29 | +6 | 33 | Playoffs |
| 4 | Colo-Colo | 19 | 9 | 5 | 5 | 34 | 24 | +10 | 32 | Playoffs |
| 5 | Cobresal | 19 | 9 | 5 | 5 | 32 | 25 | +7 | 32 | Repechaje |
| 6 | Huachipato | 19 | 10 | 1 | 8 | 31 | 28 | +3 | 31 | Playoffs |
| 7 | Everton | 19 | 8 | 6 | 5 | 32 | 27 | +5 | 30 | Repechaje |
| 8 | Coquimbo Unido | 19 | 9 | 2 | 8 | 29 | 27 | +2 | 29 | Repechaje |
| 9 | Rangers | 19 | 7 | 7 | 5 | 24 | 23 | +1 | 28 | |
| 10 | Unión Española | 19 | 7 | 5 | 7 | 32 | 31 | +1 | 26 | Playoffs |
| 11 | Deportes La Serena | 19 | 7 | 5 | 7 | 28 | 35 | −7 | 26 | |
| 12 | Deportes Concepción | 19 | 6 | 7 | 6 | 20 | 21 | −1 | 25 | Repechaje |
| 13 | Santiago Wanderers | 19 | 7 | 2 | 10 | 28 | 30 | −2 | 23 | |
| 14 | Universidad de Concepción | 19 | 6 | 4 | 9 | 23 | 31 | −8 | 22 | |
| 15 | Palestino | 19 | 6 | 3 | 10 | 21 | 28 | −7 | 21 | |
| 16 | Deportes Puerto Montt | 19 | 5 | 3 | 11 | 30 | 36 | −6 | 18 | |
| 17 | Unión San Felipe | 19 | 5 | 3 | 11 | 16 | 26 | −10 | 18 | |
| 18 | Deportes Temuco | 19 | 3 | 8 | 8 | 24 | 31 | −7 | 17 | |
| 19 | Deportes Melipilla | 19 | 4 | 5 | 10 | 14 | 30 | −16 | 17 | |
| 20 | Audax Italiano | 19 | 3 | 7 | 9 | 22 | 32 | −10 | 16 | |

Repechaje

| Match | Home | Visitor | Result |
|---|---|---|---|
| 1 | Coquimbo Unido | Everton | 2–1 |
| 2 | Deportes Concepción | Cobresal | 4–3 |

=== Playoffs ===
Quarterfinals
1 | Universidad Católica | 2 | 4 | 6
12 | Deportes Concepción | 1 | 1 | 2
2 | Universidad de Chile | 2 | 0 | 2 (2)
10 | Unión Española (p) | 1 | 1 | 2 (3)
3 | Cobreloa | 0 | 1 | 1
8 | Coquimbo Unido | 1 | 1 | 2
4 | Colo-Colo | 0 | 0 | 0
6 | Huachipato | 4 | 1 | 5

Semifinals
1 | Universidad Católica | 0 | 1 | 1 (9)
10 | Unión Española (p) | 0 | 1 | 1 (10)
8 | Coquimbo Unido | 2 | 1 | 3
6 | Huachipato | 1 | 1 | 2

Finals
10 | Unión Española | 1 | 3 | 4
8 | Coquimbo Unido | 0 | 2 | 2

=== First leg ===
3 July 2005
17:10 (UTC-4)

| Unión Española | 1 – 0 | Coquimbo Unido |
|---|---|---|
| Neira 76' |

Estadio Santa Laura, Santiago
Attendance: 14,000
Referee: P. Pozo
9 July 2005
19:10 (UTC-4)

| Coquimbo Unido | 2 – 3 | Unión Española |
|---|---|---|
| Robles 13', 62' | | 43' Neira; 52' Ribera; 88' (pen.) Sierra |

Estadio Francisco Sánchez, Coquimbo
Attendance: 11,000
Referee: R. Selman

2005 Campeonato Nacional
Apertura winners
Unión Española
7th title

=== Top goalscorers ===
| Rank | Player | Club | Goals |
|---|---|---|---|
| 1 | (Chile) Joel Estay | Everton | 13 |
| 1 | (Chile) Álvaro Sarabia | Deportes Puerto Montt | 13 |
| 1 | (Chile) Héctor Mancilla | Huachipato | 13 |
| 4 | (Chile) José Luis Villanueva | Universidad Católica | 12 |
| 5 | (Chile) Marcelo Corrales | Coquimbo Unido | 11 |
| 6 | (Chile) Manuel Neira | Unión Española | 10 |
| 6 | (Chile) Marco Olea | Universidad de Chile | 10 |

== Torneo Clausura ==
Torneo Clausura
- Season: 2005
- Champions: Universidad Católica; 9th title
- 2006 Copa Libertadores: Universidad Católica; Colo-Colo
- Matches: 215
- Goals: 561 (2.61 per match)
- Top goalscorer: Patricio Galaz (19 goals)
- Biggest home win: Audax Italiano 6–0 Concepción (31 July)
- Biggest away win: Audax Italiano 4–5 Unión Española (20 November)
- Highest attendance: 60,000; Universidad Católica 2–1 Universidad de Chile (22 December)

The 2005 Torneo Clausura was the season's second tournament. Unión Española was the defending champion after beating Coquimbo Unido in the Torneo Apertura final.

=== Qualification stage ===
==== Group standings ====
Group A
| Pos | Team | Pld | W | D | L | GF | GA | GD | Pts | Qualification |
|---|---|---|---|---|---|---|---|---|---|---|
| 1 | Universidad Católica | 19 | 15 | 4 | 0 | 33 | 3 | +30 | 49 | Qualify to the playoffs |
| 2 | Huachipato | 19 | 10 | 4 | 5 | 31 | 20 | +11 | 34 | Qualify to the playoffs |
| 3 | Deportes Concepción | 19 | 9 | 6 | 4 | 28 | 24 | +4 | 33 | Qualify to the repechaje |
| 4 | Unión San Felipe | 19 | 6 | 5 | 8 | 24 | 33 | −9 | 23 | |
| 5 | Deportes Puerto Montt | 19 | 5 | 3 | 11 | 17 | 31 | −14 | 18 | |

Group B
| Pos | Team | Pld | W | D | L | GF | GA | GD | Pts | Qualification |
|---|---|---|---|---|---|---|---|---|---|---|
| 1 | Universidad de Chile | 19 | 11 | 5 | 3 | 34 | 24 | +10 | 38 | Qualify to the playoffs |
| 2 | Deportes La Serena | 19 | 6 | 6 | 7 | 24 | 24 | 0 | 24 | Qualify to the playoffs |
| 3 | Everton | 19 | 5 | 8 | 6 | 23 | 22 | +1 | 23 | |
| 4 | Santiago Wanderers | 19 | 6 | 5 | 8 | 17 | 23 | −6 | 23 | |
| 5 | Deportes Temuco | 19 | 6 | 1 | 12 | 17 | 39 | −22 | 19 | |

Group C
| Pos | Team | Pld | W | D | L | GF | GA | GD | Pts | Qualification |
|---|---|---|---|---|---|---|---|---|---|---|
| 1 | Cobresal | 19 | 8 | 4 | 7 | 30 | 24 | +6 | 28 | Qualify to the playoffs |
| 2 | Cobreloa | 19 | 6 | 5 | 8 | 23 | 21 | +2 | 23 | Qualify to the repechaje |
| 3 | Palestino | 19 | 5 | 8 | 6 | 23 | 22 | +1 | 23 | |
| 4 | Audax Italiano | 19 | 4 | 6 | 9 | 24 | 32 | −8 | 18 | |
| 5 | Santiago Morning | 18 | 4 | 5 | 9 | 22 | 32 | −10 | 17 | |

Group D
| Pos | Team | Pld | W | D | L | GF | GA | GD | Pts | Qualification |
|---|---|---|---|---|---|---|---|---|---|---|
| 1 | Colo-Colo | 19 | 13 | 5 | 1 | 47 | 17 | +30 | 44 | Qualify to the playoffs |
| 2 | Universidad de Concepción | 19 | 8 | 3 | 8 | 27 | 28 | −1 | 27 | Qualify to the playoffs |
| 3 | Unión Española | 19 | 6 | 6 | 7 | 30 | 34 | −4 | 24 | |
| 4 | Deportes Melipilla | 19 | 6 | 2 | 11 | 17 | 23 | −6 | 20 | |
| 5 | Rangers | 19 | 4 | 6 | 9 | 24 | 32 | −8 | 18 | |

==== Aggregate table ====
| Pos | Team | Pld | W | D | L | GF | GA | GD | Pts | Qualification |
|---|---|---|---|---|---|---|---|---|---|---|
| 1 | Universidad Católica | 19 | 15 | 4 | 0 | 33 | 3 | +30 | 49 | Playoffs |
| 2 | Colo-Colo | 19 | 13 | 5 | 1 | 47 | 17 | +30 | 44 | Playoffs |
| 3 | Universidad de Chile | 19 | 11 | 5 | 3 | 34 | 24 | +10 | 38 | Playoffs |
| 4 | Huachipato | 19 | 10 | 4 | 5 | 31 | 20 | +11 | 34 | Playoffs |
| 5 | Deportes Concepción | 19 | 9 | 6 | 4 | 28 | 24 | +4 | 33 | Repechaje |
| 6 | Cobresal | 19 | 8 | 4 | 7 | 30 | 24 | +6 | 28 | Playoffs |
| 7 | Universidad de Concepción | 19 | 8 | 3 | 8 | 27 | 28 | −1 | 27 | Playoffs |
| 8 | Deportes La Serena | 19 | 6 | 6 | 7 | 24 | 24 | 0 | 24 | Playoffs |
| 9 | Unión Española | 19 | 6 | 6 | 7 | 30 | 34 | −4 | 24 | |
| 10 | Cobreloa | 19 | 6 | 5 | 8 | 23 | 21 | +2 | 23 | Repechaje |
| 11 | Palestino | 19 | 5 | 8 | 6 | 23 | 22 | +1 | 23 | |
| 12 | Everton | 19 | 5 | 8 | 6 | 23 | 22 | +1 | 23 | |
| 13 | Santiago Wanderers | 19 | 6 | 5 | 8 | 17 | 23 | −6 | 23 | |
| 14 | Unión San Felipe | 19 | 6 | 5 | 8 | 24 | 33 | −9 | 23 | |
| 15 | Deportes Melipilla | 19 | 6 | 2 | 11 | 17 | 23 | −6 | 20 | |
| 16 | Deportes Temuco | 19 | 6 | 1 | 12 | 17 | 39 | −22 | 19 | |
| 17 | Audax Italiano | 19 | 4 | 6 | 9 | 24 | 32 | −8 | 18 | |
| 18 | Rangers | 19 | 4 | 6 | 9 | 24 | 32 | −8 | 18 | |
| 19 | Deportes Puerto Montt | 19 | 5 | 3 | 11 | 17 | 31 | −14 | 18 | |
| 20 | Coquimbo Unido | 19 | 3 | 6 | 10 | 18 | 30 | −12 | 15 | |

Repechaje

| Match | Home | Visitor | Result |
|---|---|---|---|
| 1 | Cobreloa | Deportes Concepción | 5–0 |

=== Playoffs ===
Quarterfinals
1 | Universidad Católica | 1 | 2 | 3
10 | Cobreloa | 1 | 1 | 2
2 | Colo-Colo | 1 | 3 | 4 (1)
8 | Deportes La Serena (p) | 1 | 3 | 4 (4)
3 | Universidad de Chile | 2 | 0 | 2
7 | U. de Concepción | 1 | 0 | 1
4 | Huachipato | 1 | 1 | 2
6 | Cobresal | 2 | 1 | 3

Semifinals
1 | Universidad Católica | 3 | 1 | 4
8 | Deportes La Serena | 3 | 0 | 3
3 | Universidad de Chile | 1 | 4 | 5
6 | Cobresal | 2 | 2 | 4

Finals
1 | Universidad Católica (p) | 1 | 1 | 2 (5)
2 | Universidad de Chile | 0 | 2 | 2 (4)

=== Finals ===
18 December 2005

| Universidad de Chile | 0 – 1 | Universidad Católica |
|---|---|---|
| | | 70' Rubio |

Estadio Nacional, Santiago
Attendance: 50,000
Referee: P. Pozo
22 December 2005

| Universidad Católica | 1 – 2 | Universidad de Chile |
|---|---|---|
| Osorio 5' | | 52' Salas; 73' Rivarola |
Penalties
| Conca (penalty scored); Arrué (penalty scored); L. Quinteros (penalty scored); Fuenzalida (penalty scored); J. Quinteros (penalty scored) | 5–4 | (penalty scored) Salas; (penalty scored) Valencia; (penalty missed) Ponce; (penalty scored) Droguett; (penalty scored) Rivarola |

Estadio Nacional, Santiago
Attendance: 54,635
Referee: R. Selman

2005 Clausura winners
Universidad Católica
9th title

=== Season table ===
| Pos | Team | 2003 Pts | 2004 Pts | 2005 Pts | Total Pts | Total Pld | Avg | Qualification / Relegation |
|---|---|---|---|---|---|---|---|---|
| 1 | Colo-Colo | 55 | 65 | 76 | 196 | 108 | 1.815 | 2006 Copa Libertadores First Stage |
| 2 | Universidad Católica | 44 | 51 | 93 | 188 | 108 | 1.741 | |
| 3 | Universidad de Chile | 43 | 57 | 77 | 177 | 108 | 1.639 | |
| 4 | Deportes Concepción | 0 | 0 | 61 | 61 | 38 | 1.605 | |
| 5 | Cobreloa | 53 | 62 | 56 | 171 | 108 | 1.583 | |
| 6 | Universidad de Concepción | 56 | 60 | 46 | 162 | 108 | 1.5 | |
| 7 | Huachipato | 41 | 47 | 65 | 153 | 108 | 1.417 | |
| 8 | Unión Española | 49 | 49 | 50 | 148 | 108 | 1.37 | |
| 9 | Santiago Wanderers | 46 | 50 | 46 | 142 | 108 | 1.315 | |
| 10 | Cobresal | 43 | 34 | 60 | 137 | 108 | 1.269 | |
| 11 | Everton | 0 | 43 | 53 | 96 | 76 | 1.263 | |
| 12 | Audax Italiano | 43 | 47 | 34 | 124 | 108 | 1.148 | |
| 13 | Deportes La Serena | 0 | 34 | 50 | 84 | 76 | 1.105 | |
| 14 | Palestino | 43 | 35 | 41 | 119 | 108 | 1.102 | |
| 15 | Rangers | 39 | 33 | 46 | 118 | 108 | 1.093 | |
| 16 | Coquimbo Unido | 17 | 47 | 45 | 108 | 108 | 1 | |
| 17 | Deportes Puerto Montt | 40 | 37 | 36 | 113 | 108 | 1.046 | Relegation/promotion matches |
| 18 | Deportes Melipilla | 0 | 0 | 37 | 37 | 40 | 0.925 | Relegation/promotion matches |
| 19 | Deportes Temuco | 28 | 37 | 30 | 94 | 108 | 0.88 | Relegated to the Primera B |
| 20 | Unión San Felipe | 22 | 32 | 41 | 95 | 108 | 0.88 | Relegated to the Primera B |

=== Promotion playoffs ===
O'Higgins reached its promotion to Primera División after beating Deportes Melipilla 4–3 in the aggregate result, in this way Rancagua–based side broke a five-year absence in top level. Whilst Deportes Puerto Montt remained in the top level after beating Provincial Osorno on penalties.

| 26 November 2005 | Provincial Osorno | 0 – 1 | Deportes Puerto Montt | Estadio Parque Schott, Osorno |
| | | | 26' Martínez | Attendance: 8,000; Referee: E. Osses |

| 26 November 2005 | O'Higgins | 1 – 0 | Deportes Melipilla | Estadio El Teniente, Rancagua |
| | Núñez 24' (pen.) | | | Referee: C. Chandía |

| 30 November 2005 | Deportes Puerto Montt | 1 – 2 (5 – 3 p) | Provincial Osorno | Estadio Chinquihue, Puerto Montt |
| | Laffatigue 1' | | 27' Mina; 71' Jara | Attendance: 7,000; Referee: R. Selman |

| 3 December 2005 | Deportes Melipilla | 3 – 3 | O'Higgins | Estadio Roberto Bravo, Melipilla |
| | Monegat 61'; J. García 89'; Barrera 90+1' | | 27' (pen.), 65' Flores; 83' Lucero | Referee: R. Selman |

=== Top goalscorers ===
| Rank | Player | Club | Goals |
|---|---|---|---|
| 1 | (Chile) César Díaz | Cobresal | 13 |
| 1 | (Chile) Gonzalo Fierro | Colo-Colo | 13 |
| 1 | (Chile) Cristian Montecinos | Deportes Concepción | 13 |
| 4 | (Chile) Felipe Flores Quijada | Deportes La Serena | 11 |
| 4 | (Argentina) Francis Ferrero | Unión San Felipe | 11 |
| 4 | (Chile) Humberto Suazo | Audax Italiano | 11 |
