= 2005 Torneo Clausura (Chile) =

Campeonato Nacional Clausura Copa Banco del Estado
- Season: 2005
- Dates: 15 July – 22 December 2005
- Champions: Universidad Católica; 9th title
- Relegated: Deportes Temuco; Unión San Felipe; Deportes Melipilla (Relegation play-off)
- 2006 Copa Libertadores: Universidad Católica; Colo-Colo
- Matches played: 205
- Goals scored: 558 (2.72 per match)
- Top goalscorer: César Díaz; Gonzalo Fierro; Cristián Montecinos (13 goals)
- Biggest home win: Audax Italiano 6–0 Concepción (31 July)
- Biggest away win: Audax Italiano 4–5 Unión Española (20 November)
- Highest attendance: 54,635; Universidad Católica 1–2 Universidad de Chile (22 December)
- Total attendance: 885,774
- Average attendance: 4,320

The 2005 Campeonato Nacional Clausura Copa Banco del Estado was the 78th Chilean League top flight, in which Universidad Católica won its 9th league title after beating Universidad de Chile on penalties, in the finals.

== Qualifying stage ==
=== Results ===
	AUD	CLO	CSA	COL	DCO	COQ	EVE	HUA	DLS	DME	PAL	DPM	RAN	SFE	DTE	UCA	UCH	UCO	UES	SWA
Audax					6–0	0–0		1–0	0–0			3–3	2–2			0–4	1–1	1–1	4–5	
Cobreloa	1–2			0–1			1–1	2–1		3–1						0–2		2–0	4–1	3–0
Cobresal	2–1	3–1		2–2				2–0		2–0	1–1		2–0	3–0	4–1					1–2
Colo-Colo	3–0				2–1				1–1		4–1		4–1	5–0	4–0	0–0				1–1
Concepción		1–0	1–0			3–0	2–1		2–1				1–1	1–1	3–1		3–1		2–1	
Coquimbo		2–2	1–1	2–4			2–2	0–1	1–2	2–1					3–0				1–1	
Everton	2–1		3–1	1–3						1–1	0–0			3–1		1–2			0–0	0–1
Huachipato				2–2	3–1		3–1				0–0				5–1	0–0		2–0	3–1	2–1
La Serena		1–0	2–3				0–0	2–3				2–0	0–1	1–1	2–0		2–3		1–1	
Melipilla	1–0			2–3	1–0			1–0	1–0			1–0	4–1			0–1		1–2		0–1
Palestino	4–0	1–1			0–2	3–1			3–4	0–0					1–0	4–0	1–1	1–2		
Puerto Montt		1–0	1–0	0–3	1–1	1–0	0–1	0–1			2–0							1–2	2–1	
Rangers		0–1				0–1	1–1	1–1			2–2	3–0		2–1	5–1		1–3			
San Felipe	2–0	1–1				2–1		2–3		2–0	1–1	1–1					4–1	2–1		
Temuco	1–0	2–1					0–3			1–0		4–1		1–0			1–2	1–2		1–0
U. Católica			1–0		0–0	1–0			3–0		3–0	1–0	3–0	5–1	2–0		2–1			
U. de Chile		0–0	1–1	1–0		3–0	1–1	2–1		2–1		4–2						1–0	5–3	
U. Concepción			4–1	1–2	3–3	1–1	2–1		1–3				2–1			0–1				1–0
U. Española			2–1	1–3						2–1	4–1		2–1	0–1	1–1	0–0		3–2		
S. Wanderers	0–2				1–1	2–0			0–0			3–1	1–1	3–1		0–2	0–1		1–1	

=== Group standings ===
==== Group A ====
Pos	Team	Pld	W	D	L	GF	GA	GD	Pts	Qualification
1	Universidad Católica	19	15	4	0	33	3	+30	49	Qualify to the playoffs
2	Huachipato	19	10	4	5	31	20	+11	34	Qualify to the playoffs
3	Deportes Concepción	19	9	6	4	28	24	+4	33	Qualify to the repechaje
4	Unión San Felipe	19	6	5	8	24	33	−9	23	
5	Deportes Puerto Montt	19	5	3	11	17	31	−14	18	

==== Group B ====
Pos	Team	Pld	W	D	L	GF	GA	GD	Pts	Qualification
1	Universidad de Chile	19	11	5	3	34	24	+10	38	Qualify to the playoffs
2	Deportes La Serena	19	6	6	7	24	24	0	24	Qualify to the playoffs
3	Everton	19	5	8	6	23	22	+1	23	
4	Santiago Wanderers	19	6	5	8	17	23	−6	23	
5	Deportes Temuco	19	6	1	12	17	39	−22	19	

==== Group C ====
Pos	Team	Pld	W	D	L	GF	GA	GD	Pts	Qualification
1	Cobresal	19	8	4	7	30	24	+6	28	Qualify to the playoffs
2	Cobreloa	19	6	5	8	23	21	+2	23	Qualify to the repechaje
3	Palestino	19	5	8	6	23	22	+1	23	
4	Audax Italiano	19	4	6	9	24	32	−8	18	
5	Santiago Morning	18	4	5	9	22	32	−10	17	

==== Group D ====
Pos	Team	Pld	W	D	L	GF	GA	GD	Pts	Qualification
1	Colo-Colo	19	13	5	1	47	17	+30	44	Qualify to the playoffs
2	Universidad de Concepción	19	8	3	8	27	28	−1	27	Qualify to the playoffs
3	Unión Española	19	6	6	7	30	34	−4	24	
4	Deportes Melipilla	19	6	2	11	17	23	−6	20	
5	Rangers	19	4	6	9	24	32	−8	18	

=== Aggregate table ===
Pos	Team	Pld	W	D	L	GF	GA	GD	Pts	Qualification
1	Universidad Católica	19	15	4	0	33	3	+30	49	Playoffs
2	Colo-Colo	19	13	5	1	47	17	+30	44	Playoffs
3	Universidad de Chile	19	11	5	3	34	24	+10	38	Playoffs
4	Huachipato	19	10	4	5	31	20	+11	34	Playoffs
5	Deportes Concepción	19	9	6	4	28	24	+4	33	Repechaje
6	Cobresal	19	8	4	7	30	24	+6	28	Playoffs
7	Universidad de Concepción	19	8	3	8	27	28	−1	27	Playoffs
8	Deportes La Serena	19	6	6	7	24	24	0	24	Playoffs
9	Unión Española	19	6	6	7	30	34	−4	24	
10	Cobreloa	19	6	5	8	23	21	+2	23	Repechaje
11	Palestino	19	5	8	6	23	22	+1	23	
12	Everton	19	5	8	6	23	22	+1	23	
13	Santiago Wanderers	19	6	5	8	17	23	−6	23	
14	Unión San Felipe	19	6	5	8	24	33	−9	23	
15	Deportes Melipilla	19	6	2	11	17	23	−6	20	
16	Deportes Temuco	19	6	1	12	17	39	−22	19	
17	Audax Italiano	19	4	6	9	24	32	−8	18	
18	Rangers	19	4	6	9	24	32	−8	18	
19	Deportes Puerto Montt	19	5	3	11	17	31	−14	18	
20	Coquimbo Unido	19	3	6	10	18	30	−12	15	

==== Repechaje ====
Match	Home	Visitor	Result
1	Cobreloa	Deportes Concepción	5–0

== Playoffs ==
Quarterfinals
1	Universidad Católica	1	2	3
10	Cobreloa	1	1	2
2	Colo-Colo	1	3	4 (1)
8	Deportes La Serena (p)	1	3	4 (4)
3	Universidad de Chile	2	0	2
7	U. de Concepción	1	0	1
4	Huachipato	1	1	2
6	Cobresal	2	1	3

Semifinals
1	Universidad Católica	3	1	4
8	Deportes La Serena	3	0	3
3	Universidad de Chile	1	4	5
6	Cobresal	2	2	4

Finals
1	Universidad Católica (p)	1	1	2 (5)
2	Universidad de Chile	0	2	2 (4)

=== Finals ===
18 December 2005

Universidad de Chile	0 – 1	Universidad Católica
		70' Rubio

Estadio Nacional, Santiago
Attendance: 50,000
Referee: P. Pozo
22 December 2005

Universidad Católica	1 – 2	Universidad de Chile
Osorio 5'		52' Salas; 73' Rivarola
Penalties
Conca (penalty scored); Arrué (penalty scored); L. Quinteros (penalty scored); Fuenzalida (penalty scored); J. Quinteros (penalty scored)	5–4	(penalty scored) Salas; (penalty scored) Valencia; (penalty missed) Ponce; (penalty scored) Droguett; (penalty scored) Rivarola

Estadio Nacional, Santiago
Attendance: 54,635
Referee: R. Selman

2005 Clausura winners
Universidad Católica
9th title

== Season table ==
Pos	Team	2003 Pts	2004 Pts	2005 Pts	Total Pts	Total Pld	Avg	Qualification / Relegation
1	Colo-Colo	55	65	76	196	108	1.815	2006 Copa Libertadores First Stage
2	Universidad Católica	44	51	93	188	108	1.741	
3	Universidad de Chile	43	57	77	177	108	1.639	
4	Deportes Concepción	0	0	61	61	38	1.605	
5	Cobreloa	53	62	56	171	108	1.583	
6	Universidad de Concepción	56	60	46	162	108	1.5	
7	Huachipato	41	47	65	153	108	1.417	
8	Unión Española	49	49	50	148	108	1.37	
9	Santiago Wanderers	46	50	46	142	108	1.315	
10	Cobresal	43	34	60	137	108	1.269	
11	Everton	0	43	53	96	76	1.263	
12	Audax Italiano	43	47	34	124	108	1.148	
13	Deportes La Serena	0	34	50	84	76	1.105	
14	Palestino	43	35	41	119	108	1.102	
15	Rangers	39	33	46	118	108	1.093	
16	Coquimbo Unido	17	47	45	108	108	1	
17	Deportes Puerto Montt	40	37	36	113	108	1.046	Relegation/promotion matches
18	Deportes Melipilla	0	0	37	37	40	0.925	Relegation/promotion matches
19	Deportes Temuco	28	37	30	94	108	0.88	Relegated to the Primera B
20	Unión San Felipe	22	32	41	95	108	0.88	Relegated to the Primera B

== Top goalscorers ==
Rank	Player	Club	Goals
1	(Chile) César Díaz	Cobresal	13
1	(Chile) Gonzalo Fierro	Colo-Colo	13
1	(Chile) Cristian Montecinos	Deportes Concepción	13
4	(Chile) Felipe Flores Quijada	Deportes La Serena	11
4	(Argentina) Francis Ferrero	Unión San Felipe	11
4	(Chile) Humberto Suazo	Audax Italiano	11

== Promotion / relegation playoffs ==
O'Higgins reached its promotion to Primera División after beating Deportes Melipilla 4–3 in the aggregate result, in this way Rancagua–based side broke a five-year absence in top level. Whilst Deportes Puerto Montt remained in the top level after beating Provincial Osorno on penalties.

26 November 2005	Provincial Osorno	0 – 1	Deportes Puerto Montt	Estadio Parque Schott, Osorno
			26' Martínez	Attendance: 8,000; Referee: E. Osses

26 November 2005	O'Higgins	1 – 0	Deportes Melipilla	Estadio El Teniente, Rancagua
	Núñez 24' (pen.)			Referee: C. Chandía

30 November 2005	Deportes Puerto Montt	1 – 2 (5 – 3 p)	Provincial Osorno	Estadio Chinquihue, Puerto Montt
	Laffatigue 1'		27' Mina; 71' Jara	Attendance: 7,000; Referee: R. Selman

3 December 2005	Deportes Melipilla	3 – 3	O'Higgins	Estadio Roberto Bravo, Melipilla
	Monegat 61'; J. García 89'; Barrera 90+1'		27' (pen.), 65' Flores; 83' Lucero	Referee: R. Selman
