= 2000 Copa Apertura final =

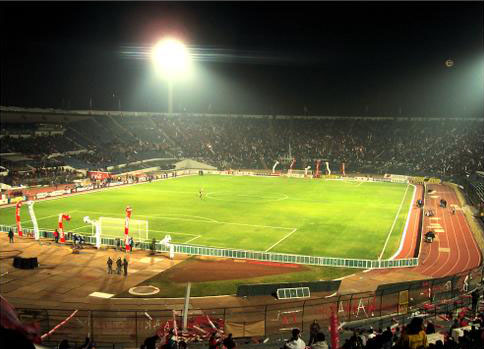
- Event: 2000 Copa Apertura
Universidad de Chile	Santiago Morning
2	1
- Date: 11 May 2000
- Venue: Estadio Nacional, Santiago, Chile
- Referee: Carlos Robles
- Attendance: 13,529

The 2000 Copa Apertura final was played between Universidad de Chile and Santiago Morning at the Estadio Nacional in Santiago, Chile on 11 May 2000. Universidad de Chile won the match 2–1 after extra time.

== Match details ==
11 May 2000
20:10 (UTC-4)

Universidad de Chile	2–1 (a.e.t.)	Santiago Morning
Acuña 7', 118'		Martel 54'

Estadio Nacional, Santiago
Attendance: 13,529
Referee: C. Robles

Universidad de Chile	Santiago Morning

UNIVERSIDAD DE CHILE:
GK	(Argentina) Sergio Vargas
DF	(Chile) Ricardo Rojas
DF	(Chile) Ronald Fuentes
DF	(Chile) Rafael Olarra
MF	(Chile) Eduardo Arancibia
MF	(Chile) Clarence Acuña
MF	(Chile) Pablo Galdames
MF	(Chile) Mauricio Aros
MF	(Chile) Rodrigo Tello
FW	(Argentina) Diego Rivarola	(substituted off) 71'
FW	(Chile) Pedro González
Substitutes:
FW	(Chile) Rodrigo Barrera	(substituted on) 71'
Manager:
(Chile) César Vaccia

SANTIAGO MORNING:
GK	(Chile) Carlos Tejas
DF	(Chile) Juan González
DF	(Argentina) Pablo Lenci
DF	(Chile) Marco Muñoz
MF	(Chile) Manuel Ibarra
MF	(Chile) Joel Reyes
MF	(Chile) Alexis Garrido
MF	(Chile) Francisco Cañete	(substituted off) 86'
MF	(Chile) Francisco Arrué	(substituted off) 86'
FW	(Chile) Fernando Martel
FW	(Chile) Juan Carreño
Substitutes:
MF	(Chile) José Ortega	(substituted on) 86'
FW	(Argentina) Francis Ferrero	(substituted on) 86'
Manager:
(Paraguay) Sergio Nichiporuk
