= Luis Flores =

Luis Flores may refer to:

== Sportspeople ==
=== Association football ===
- Luis Flores (Mexican footballer) (born 1961), Mexican former footballer
- Luis Flores (footballer, born 1964), Peruvian football midfielder
- Luis Flores Manzor (born 1982), Chilean footballer
- Luis Flores Abarca (born 1982), Chilean footballer
- Luis Flores (soccer) (born 2002), American soccer player
- Luis Flores (Bolivian footballer) (born 2002)

=== Other sports ===
- Luis Flores (basketball) (born 1981), Dominican basketball player
- Luis Alberto Flores Asturias (born 1947), Guatemalan athlete and politician
- Luis Flores (sprinter) (born 1978), Spanish Olympic athlete
- Luis Flores (triple jumper) (born 1967), Honduran Olympic athlete
- Luis-Manuel Flores (born 1985), Mexican tennis player
- Luis Flores (table tennis) (born 1987), Chilean table tennis player
- Luís Flores, Puerto Rican swimmer

== Others ==
- Luis A. Flores, Peruvian lawyer, politician and diplomat
- Luis Flores, character in Fear the Walking Dead
