= Víctor Osorio =

Víctor Osorio may refer to:

- Víctor Osorio (footballer), Chilean footballer
- Víctor Osorio Reyes, Chilean journalist and politician
