= Ariel Pereyra (forward) =

Argentine–born Chilean footballer and manager (born 1973)

Personal information
- Full name: Ariel Roberto Pereyra Legallais
- Date of birth: 11 November 1973 (age 52)
- Place of birth: Mendoza, Argentina
- Height: 1.71 m (5 ft 7 in)
- Position: Striker

Youth career
- Godoy Cruz

Senior career*
| Years | Team | Apps | (Gls) |
| 1993–1998 | Godoy Cruz | 101 | (26) |
| 1998 | Santiago Wanderers | 18 | (4) |
| 1999–2004 | Everton | 17 | (4) |
| 2001 | → Coquimbo Unido (loan) | 29 | (7) |
| 2004–2005 | Deportivo Italmaracaibo | 21 | (4) |
| 2005–2010 | Unión La Calera | 184 | (81) |
| 2011–2012 | Curicó Unido | 67 | (20) |
| 2013 | Unión La Calera | 8 | (2) |
| Total | | 445 | (148) |

Managerial career
- 2014–2015: Unión La Calera
- 2015–2016: Deportes Concepción
- 2016: Magallanes
- 2017: San Marcos
- 2018: Deportes La Serena
- 2019: Independiente de Cauquenes
- 2021: San Antonio Unido
- 2022: Deportes Melipilla
- * Club domestic league appearances and goals

Ariel Roberto Pereyra Legallais (born 11 November 1973) is a retired Argentine naturalized Chilean footballer who has played at Godoy Cruz, Venezuela and several clubs in Chile.

== Club career ==
Pereyra began his career at Godoy Cruz Antonio Tomba, professional club of his natal city Mendoza. There he played more than 100 games and scored 26 goals. In 1998, he moved to Chile and joined to Santiago Wanderers. He had an unsuccessful spell at Valparaíso's side. That season Wanderers was relegated to the Primera B after finishing in the annual table's bottom. Following a brief spell in Coquimbo Unido in 2001, the incoming year he moved to Everton (Wanderers' archi–rival), where he helped the team to won the 2003 Primera B championship (Chile second-level tournament).

In June 2005, after the entire 2004 in Venezuelan football playing for Deportivo Italmaracaibo, Pereyra returned to Chile, signing for Unión La Calera, where he coincided with players such as Víctor Rivero and Christian Riffo. There he broke a record after reaching score more than 100 goals in the Chilean football. In 2008 he was Primera B tournament goalscorer.

In late 2010, he left Unión La Calera after five years playing there. After his unusual decision to disassociate from Unión La Calera (considering which the team achieved the promotion to 2011 Primera División de Chile season), then he moved to Curicó Unido, when he played two seasons (2011 and 2012).

== Managerial career ==
In 2021, he was the manager of San Antonio Unido in the Segunda División Profesional de Chile. In 2022, he worked as the manager of Deportes Melipilla.

Following Deportes Melipilla, Pereyra assumed as teacher and football coach for Colegio Hispano Chileno El Pilar from Curicó and next he started a football academy in the same city.

== Honours ==
=== Player ===
Everton

- Primera B (1): 2003

Unión La Calera

- Primera B (1): Runner-up 2010

Individual

- Primera B goalscorer (2): 2010, 2011
