= Bolado =

Bolado is a surname of Spanish origin and may refer to:

- Carlos Bolado (born 1964), a Mexican filmmaker
- Carlos Vidal Bolado (1914–1996), a Cuban conga drummer
- Cris Bolado (1969 – 2017), a Filipino professional basketball player
- Iván Bolado (born 1989), a Spanish-born Equatoguinean footballer
- Pablo Bolados (born 1978), a Chilean footballer
