= Carlos Ortega =

Carlos Ortega may refer to:

- Carlos Ortega (unionist) (born 1945), Venezuelan unionist and political leader
- Carlos Ortega (boxer) (born 1989), Panamanian boxer
- Carlos Ortega (Chilean footballer) (born 1973), Chilean football goalkeeper
- Carlos Ortega (businessman), Spanish businessman
