= Luis Santelices =

Chilean footballer (born 1985)

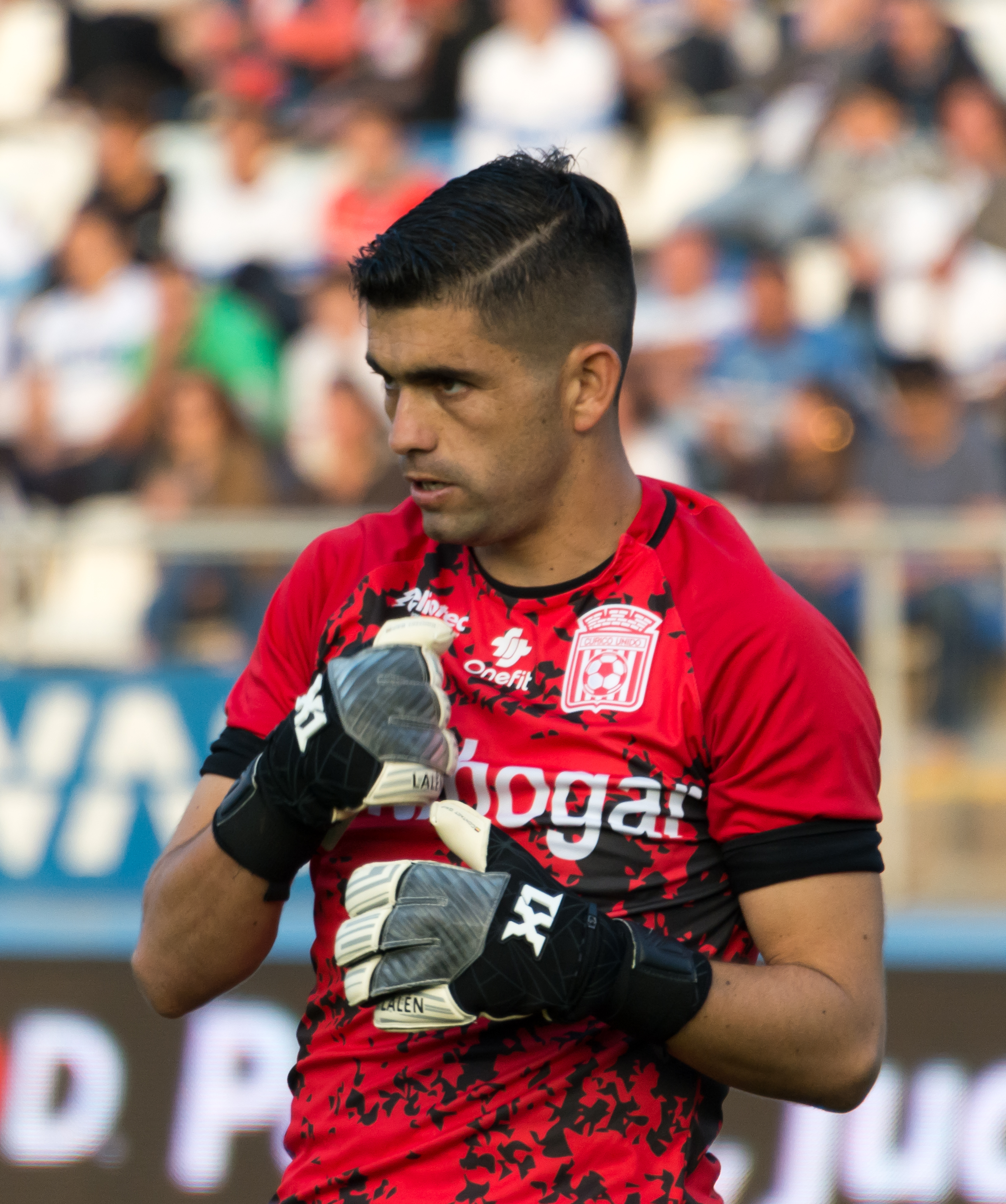
- Santelices with Curicó Unido in 2019

Personal information
- Full name: Luis Rodrigo Santelices Tello
- Date of birth: 29 October 1985 (age 41)
- Place of birth: Curicó, Chile
- Height: 1.80 m (5 ft 11 in)
- Position: Goalkeeper

Youth career
- Curicó Unido

Senior career*
| Years | Team | Apps | (Gls) |
| 2004–2019 | Curicó Unido | 170 | (0) |
| 2008 | → Linares Unido (loan) | – | (–) |
| 2014–2015 | → Deportes Antofagasta (loan) | 5 | (0) |
| 2020–2021 | Everton | 0 | (0) |
| 2022–2024 | Curicó Unido | 30 | (0) |
| 2025 | Deportes Melipilla | 20 | (0) |
| Total | | 225 | (0) |
- * Club domestic league appearances and goals

Luis Rodrigo Santelices Tello (born 29 October 1985) is a Chilean former professional footballer who plays as a goalkeeper.

== Career ==
In 2025, Santelices joined Deportes Melipilla from Curicó Unido. He retired at the end of the season.

== Post-retirement ==
Following his retirement, Santelices started to work as a sales executive for a car dealer.

== Honours ==
Curicó Unido

- Primera B: 2008
