= 2007 Campeonato Nacional Primera División =

Primera División
- Season: 2007
- Champions: Apertura: Colo-Colo (26th title); Clausura: Colo-Colo (27th title)
- Relegated: Puerto Montt; Lota Schwager; Santiago Wanderers; Coquimbo Unido
- 2008 Copa Libertadores: Colo-Colo; Universidad Católica; Audax Italiano
- 2007 Copa Sudamericana: Audax Italiano; Colo-Colo
- Top goalscorer: Apertura: Humberto Suazo (18 goals); Clausura: Carlos Villanueva (20 goals)

The 2007 Primera División del Fútbol Profesional Chileno season is the 76th season of top-flight football in Chile. The season is composed of two championship: the Torneo Apertura & Torneo Clasura.

== Format ==
Each tournament had a different format. The Apertura had a double round-robin format. The team with the most points at the end will be the champion. The Clausura consisted of two stages. The first stage was a double round-robin format. The two best teams from each group advanced to the playoffs. The playoffs were in a single-elimination format, the winner of which was the champion.

== Torneo Apertura ==
=== Standings ===
Pos	Team	Pld	W	D	L	GF	GA	GD	Pts	Qualification
1	Colo-Colo	20	14	5	1	47	16	+31	47	2008 Copa Libertadores & 2007 Pre-Copa Sudamericana
2	Universidad Católica	20	14	4	2	36	14	+22	46	2007 Pre-Copa Sudamericana
3	Audax Italiano	20	13	5	2	39	20	+19	44	2007 Pre-Copa Sudamericana
4	Huachipato	20	12	4	4	35	21	+14	40	2007 Pre-Copa Sudamericana
5	Cobreloa	20	10	5	5	44	23	+21	35	
6	Cobresal	20	9	5	6	31	21	+10	32	
7	Ñublense	20	8	8	4	31	31	0	32	
8	Unión Española	20	8	4	8	29	25	+4	28	
9	Deportes Melipilla	20	8	4	8	35	34	+1	28	
10	O'Higgins	20	8	3	9	30	38	−8	27	
11	Deportes La Serena	20	7	5	8	31	30	+1	26	
12	Everton	20	6	8	6	24	27	−3	26	
13	Universidad de Chile	20	6	7	7	20	21	−1	25	
14	Deportes Concepción	20	6	5	9	20	34	−14	23	
15	Palestino	20	5	8	7	27	30	−3	23	
16	Deportes Antofagasta	20	5	7	8	24	34	−10	22	
17	Universidad de Concepción	20	4	5	11	25	33	−8	17	
18	Deportes Puerto Montt	20	4	2	14	19	40	−21	14	
19	Coquimbo Unido	20	4	2	14	18	40	−22	14	
20	Santiago Wanderers (Note: Santiago Wanderers were docked three points for not paying their players on time in November 2006)	20	4	4	12	24	33	−9	13	
21	Lota Schwager	20	2	6	12	28	52	−24	12	

Source: Asociación Nacional de Fútbol Profesional

=== Top goalscorers ===
As of 12 June 2011.

Rank	Player	Club	Goals
1	(Chile) Humberto Suazo	Colo-Colo	18
2	(Argentina) José Luis Díaz	Cobreloa	16
3	(Argentina) Lucas Barrios	Cobreloa	14
4
4	(Chile) Luis Núñez	Universidad Católica	11
4	(Chile) César Díaz	Cobresal	11
5	(Argentina) Esteban Fuertes	Universidad Católica	10
5	(Chile) Julio Gutiérrez	Unión Española	10

=== Copa Sudamericana playoffs ===
18 July 2007	Universidad Católica	0–3	Audax Italiano	Estadio San Carlos de Apoquindo, Santiago
20:40 (UTC-4)			11' Villanueva; 32' Medina; 63' Orellana	Attendance: 7,000; Referee: E. Osses

19 July 2007	Colo-Colo	2–1	Huachipato	Estadio Sausalito, Viña del Mar
20:10 (UTC-4)	Hernández 11'; Aceval 88'		7' J. González	Attendance: 8,000; Referee: C. Chandía

Audax Italiano & Colo-Colo qualified for the 2007 Copa Sudamericana

== Torneo Clausura ==
=== First stage ===
Group 1
Pos	Team	Pld	W	D	L	GF	GA	GD	Pts	Qualification
1	Colo-Colo	20	11	6	3	40	21	+19	39	Playoffs
2	Cobresal	20	8	8	4	31	23	+8	32	Playoffs
3	Palestino	20	6	6	8	27	23	+4	24	
4	Deportes La Serena	20	6	4	10	25	33	−8	22	
5	Santiago Wanderers	20	4	5	11	15	43	−28	17	

Group 2
Pos	Team	Pld	W	D	L	GF	GA	GD	Pts	Qualification
1	Universidad de Concepción	20	9	8	3	30	19	+11	35	Playoffs
2	Universidad Católica	20	10	4	6	33	21	+12	34	Playoffs
3	Deportes Melipilla	20	7	6	7	32	34	−2	27	
4	Deportes Concepción	20	7	4	9	30	41	−11	25	
5	Unión Española	20	4	5	11	26	36	−10	17	

Group 3
Pos	Team	Pld	W	D	L	GF	GA	GD	Pts	Qualification
1	Audax Italiano	20	14	5	1	47	20	+27	47	Playoffs and 2008 Copa Libertadores First Stage (Note: Audax Italiano qualified to the 2008 Copa Libertadores as the team with the most points in the Clausura classification phase.)
2	Universidad de Chile	20	13	6	1	42	21	+21	45	Playoffs
3	Cobreloa	20	8	7	5	35	29	+6	31	Play-off Match
4	Deportes Puerto Montt	20	5	6	9	18	22	−4	21	
5	Everton	20	3	4	13	20	36	−16	13	

Notes:

Group 4
Pos	Team	Pld	W	D	L	GF	GA	GD	Pts	Qualification
1	O'Higgins	20	9	7	4	28	23	+5	34	Playoffs
2	Ñublense	20	7	5	8	32	38	−6	26	Play-off Match
3	Deportes Antofagasta	20	6	7	7	22	21	+1	25	
4	Huachipato	20	7	4	9	30	36	−6	25	
5	Lota Schwager	20	4	7	9	22	28	−6	19	
6	Coquimbo Unido	20	4	1	15	18	37	−19	13	

Updated to match(es) played on November 25, 2007. Source: RSSSF
Rules for classification: 1) points; 2) goal difference; 3) number of goals scored.

Playoff match

A playoff round was contested because there was a third-placed team who had more points than a second placed team. In a playoff round the third-placed team would have the home field advantage.

Team 1	Score	Team 2
Cobreloa	3–1	Ñublense

=== Playoff stage ===
Quarterfinals
5	Universidad Católica	5	0	5
4	Universidad de Concepción (a)	3	2	5
8	Cobreloa	2	0	2
1	Audax Italiano	2	1	3
6	O'Higgins	0	1	1
3	Colo-Colo	5	1	6
7	Cobresal	2	1	3
2	Universidad de Chile	4	2	6

Semifinals
4	Universidad de Concepción	2	3	5
1	Audax Italiano	3	1	4
3	Colo-Colo	2	1	3
2	Universidad de Chile	0	0	0

Final
4	Universidad de Concepción	0	0	0
3	Colo-Colo	1	3	4

=== Top goalscorers ===
Pos	Player	Team	Goals
1	(Chile) Carlos Villanueva	Audax Italiano	20
2	(Chile) Pedro Morales	Universidad de Chile	13
2	(Chile) Manuel Villalobos	Ñublense	13
4	(Chile) Cristián Canío	Cobreloa	12
4	(Chile) Gabriel Vargas	Cobresal	12
6	(Argentina) Esteban Fuertes	Universidad Católica	11

== Relegation ==
Pos	Team	Pld	W	D	L	GF	GA	GD	Pts	Qualification or relegation
17	Everton	40	9	12	19	44	63	−19	39	
18	Deportes Puerto Montt	40	9	8	23	37	62	−25	35	Plays Relegation/promotion Liguilla
19	Lota Schwager	40	6	13	21	50	80	−30	31	Relegated to Primera B
20	Santiago Wanderers	40	8	9	23	39	76	−37	30 (Note: 3 points deducted due to financial issues)	Relegated to Primera B
21	Coquimbo Unido	40	8	3	29	36	77	−41	27	Relegated to Primera B

=== Relegation playoffs ===
Pos	Team	Pld	W	D	L	GF	GA	GD	Pts	Promotion or qualification
1	Santiago Morning	4	2	1	1	4	3	+1	7	Promoted to Primera División
2	Deportes Puerto Montt	4	2	0	2	9	9	0	6	To Primera B
3	Deportes Copiapó	4	1	1	2	6	7	−1	4	To Primera B

== See also ==
- List of 2007 Primera División de Chile transfers
