= Ronald Gamboa =

Chilean footballer

Personal information
- Full name: Ronald Alexis Gamboa Johnson
- Date of birth: 18 June 1981 (age 45)
- Place of birth: La Serena, Chile
- Position: Attacking midfielder

Youth career
- Colo-Colo

Senior career*
Years	Team	Apps	(Gls)
2000–2001	Colo-Colo		
2002–2004	Magallanes		(3)
2004–2005	Lobos BUAP	14	(1)
2006	ESPOLI	8	(0)
2007	Unión Española	6	(0)
2008	Australian soccer		
- * Club domestic league appearances and goals

Ronald Alexis Gamboa Johnson (born 18 June 1981) is a Chilean former footballer who played as an attacking midfielder for clubs in Chile and abroad.

== Club career ==
A product of Colo-Colo youth system, Gamboa left the club at the end of 2001 season and switched to Magallanes, staying with them until 2004. At the end of 2004, he moved abroad and joined Mexican side Lobos BUAP, where he coincided with his compatriot Mario Cáceres. In 2006 he played for Ecuadorian side ESPOLI.

Back in Chile, he joined Unión Española for the 2007 season. The next year, he moved abroad again and tried to sign with Östers IF as wells as Degerfors IF in Sweden, but he finally played in the Australian soccer.

== Personal life ==
Gamboa graduated as an accountant and got a master's degree in business administration. Later, he had a high-tech trucking company.
