= Néstor Contreras =

Chilean footballer (born 1979)

Personal information
- Full name: Néstor Rubén Contreras Palma
- Date of birth: 26 February 1979 (age 47)
- Place of birth: Santiago, Chile
- Height: 1.82 m (6 ft 0 in)
- Position: Midfielder

Senior career*
Years	Team	Apps	(Gls)
1997–2004	Audax Italiano	211	(19)
2005–2006	Cobresal	44	(3)
2006	Rangers	16	(2)
2007	Deportes Concepción	12	(2)
2007	San Luis Quillota	11	(3)
2008	Santiago Morning	24	(2)
2009	Deportes Melipilla	31	(9)
2010	Deportes Iquique	33	(6)
2011–2013	San Marcos de Arica	65	(19)
- * Club domestic league appearances and goals as of 3 September 2018

Néstor Ruben Contreras Palma (born February 26, 1979) is a Chilean former footballer.

== Honours ==
=== Club ===
Deportes Iquique

- Copa Chile (1): 2010
- Primera B (1): 2010

San Marcos de Arica

- Primera B de Chile (1): 2012 Apertura
