= Germán Navea =

Chilean footballer

Personal information
- Full name: Germán Antonio Navea Torres
- Date of birth: 10 February 1980 (age 46)
- Place of birth: La Serena, Chile
- Position: Defensive midfielder

Youth career
- Academia Santa Inés
- Deportes La Serena

Senior career*
| Years | Team | Apps | (Gls) |
| 1997–2000 | Deportes La Serena | 52 | (2) |
| 2001 | Cobresal | | |
| 2002–2005 | Coquimbo Unido | 115 | (2) |
| 2006 | Cobreloa | 36 | (0) |
| 2007 | Coquimbo Unido | 32 | (0) |
| 2008–2009 | Municipal Iquique | 60 | (2) |
| 2010 | Palestino | 7 | (0) |

International career
| 1997 | Chile U17 | 10 | (0) |
| 1999 | Chile U20 | | |
- * Club domestic league appearances and goals

Germán Antonio Navea Torres (born 10 February 1980) is a Chilean former footballer who played as a defensive midfielder.

== Club career ==
A product of Deportes La Serena, Navea played for them until 2000 and switched to Cobresal in 2001, getting promotion to the Chilean top division.

Navea played for Coquimbo Unido from 2002 to 2005 and rejoined them in 2007. A historical player for them, he and his teammates in the 2005 season were honored by the club for becoming the 2005 Torneo Apertura runners-up, on 1 September 2025.

Navea also played for Cobreloa, Municipal Iquique and Palestino. With Municipal Iquique, he got promotion to the Chilean top division in the 2008 season.

== International career ==
In 1997, Navea represented Chile at under-17 level in both the South American Championship and the 1997 FIFA World Cup.

Later, Navea represented the under 20's in the 1999 South American Championship.
