= 2010 Campeonato Nacional Primera B =

The 2010 Primera B de Chile was second tier's 60th season. Deportes Iquique was the tournament's champion, winning its third title.

== Aggregated table ==
Pos	Team	Pld	W	D	L	GF	GA	GD	Pts	Qualification or relegation
1	Deportes Antofagasta	24	13	6	5	37	22	+15	45	Promoted to Promotion Playoffs
2	Unión La Calera	24	12	9	3	39	24	+15	45	Promoted to Promotion Playoffs
3	Deportes Puerto Montt	24	12	9	3	33	22	+11	45	Promoted to Promotion Playoffs
4	Unión Temuco	24	12	5	7	34	24	+10	41	Promoted to Promotion Playoffs
5	Deportes Concepción	24	9	9	6	31	24	+7	36	Promoted to Promotion Playoffs
6	Deportes Iquique	24	9	7	8	30	25	+5	34	Promoted to Promotion Playoffs
7	Lota Schwager	24	9	7	8	31	29	+2	34	Promoted to Promotion Playoffs
8	Curicó Unido	24	9	6	9	34	29	+5	33	Promoted to Promotion Playoffs
9	Naval	24	8	5	11	27	26	+1	29	
10	Rangers	24	8	5	11	26	32	−6	29	
11	San Marcos de Arica	24	7	6	11	41	55	−14	27	
12	Coquimbo Unido	24	6	8	10	24	34	−10	26	
13	Provincial Osorno	24	5	3	16	17	40	−23	18	Relegated to Tercera División de Chile
14	Deportes Copiapó	24	4	6	14	28	44	−16	18	Relegated to Tercera División de Chile

== Promotion Playoffs ==
Pos	Team	Pld	W	D	L	GF	GA	GD	BP	Pts	Promotion
1	Deportes Iquique (C, P)	14	9	3	2	22	9	+13	1	31	Champion and promoted to 2011 Primera División de Chile season
2	Unión La Calera (P)	14	6	6	2	19	11	+8	2	26	Promoted to 2011 Primera División de Chile season
3	Deportes Antofagasta	14	6	3	5	17	15	+2	3	24	
4	Curicó Unido	14	6	4	4	19	12	+7	0	22	
5	Unión Temuco	14	6	2	6	19	22	−3	2	22	
6	Deportes Concepción	14	4	3	7	14	18	−4	1	16	
7	Deportes Puerto Montt	14	3	3	8	13	22	−9	3	15	
8	Lota Schwager	14	3	2	9	13	27	−14	0	11	

(C) Champions; (P) Promoted

Primera B de Chile
2010 champion
Deportes Iquique
3rd title

== Top goalscorers ==
Rank	Name	Club	Goals
1	(Argentina) Ariel Pereyra	Unión La Calera	17
2	(Chile) Joel Estay	San Marcos de Arica	16
3	(Chile) Luis Ignacio Quinteros	Unión Temuco	15
4	(Chile) Jonathan Novoa	Deportes Puerto Montt	12
4	(Chile) Fernando Martel	Deportes Iquique	12
5	(Chile) Roberto Castillo	Deportes Antofagasta	11
6	(Chile) Patricio Schwob	Deportes Puerto Montt	10
6	(Chile) Matías Donoso	Unión Temuco	10
6	(Argentina) Fernando Méndez	Deportes Antofagasta	10
7	(Brazil) Nasa	Deportes Concepción	9
7	(Chile) Juan Francisco Viveros	Lota Schwager	9
