= Christian Riffo =

Chilean footballer

Personal information
- Full name: Christian Alberto Riffo González
- Date of birth: 2 March 1977 (age 49)
- Place of birth: Santiago, Chile
- Position: Midfielder

Youth career
- Universidad de Chile

Senior career*
Years	Team	Apps	(Gls)
1996	Universidad de Chile	10	(0)
1997	Magallanes		(0)
1998	Deportes Linares		(0)
2003	Deportes Temuco	22	(0)
2004–2005	Deportes Puerto Montt	61	(0)
2006	Unión La Calera	30	(2)
2007–2008	PSDS Deli Serdang		(0)
- * Club domestic league appearances and goals

Christian Alberto Riffo González (born 2 March 1977), sometimes referred as Cristian Riffo or Christian Alberto in Indonesia, is a Chilean former professional footballer who played as a midfielder for clubs in Chile and Indonesia.

== Career ==
A product of Universidad de Chile youth system, he made ten appearances for the club in 1996 in the top division, where he coincided with players such as Leonardo Rodríguez, Luis Musrri, Víctor Hugo and Cristián Castañeda, among others. Then, he switched to Magallanes in 1997 in the second level.

In Chile, he also played for both Deportes Temuco (2003) and Deportes Puerto Montt (2004–05) in the top division and for Unión La Calera (2006) in the second division, where he coincided with players such as Víctor Rivero and Ariel Pereyra.

Abroad, he played in Indonesia for PSDS Deli Serdang in 2007–08.

== After football ==
Riffo has gone on playing football at amateur level in clubs such as Deportivo Independiente from Santiago.
