= Sergio Nichiporuk =

Paraguayan footballer (born 1957)

Personal information
- Full name: Sergio Nichiporuk Kulik
- Date of birth: 24 February 1957 (age 69)
- Place of birth: Itapúa, Paraguay
- Position: Forward

Youth career
- Paraná FC

Senior career*
Years	Team	Apps	(Gls)
1975–1978	Nacional		
1979	Presidente Hayes		
1979–1980	Sportivo San Lorenzo		
1980	Ñublense		
1981	Santiago Wanderers		
1982	Deportes Iquique	21	(4)
1983	Mallorca	15	(4)
1983–1984	Magallanes	21	(6)
1986	Deportes La Serena		
1987	Unión San Felipe		
1987–1988	Atlante	6	(0)
1989	Deportes Laja	–	(–)
1990	Lota Schwager		(4)
1991	Municipal Las Condes	–	(–)

Managerial career
- 1994: Municipal Las Condes
- 1995–1996: Cobresal
- 1997: Deportes Concepción
- 1998–1999: Cobresal
- 2000: Santiago Morning
- 2001: Deportes Concepción
- 2001–2002: Deportes Puerto Montt
- 2004: O'Higgins
- 2005: Deportes Arica
- 2006: Cobresal
- 2007: Lota Schwager
- * Club domestic league appearances and goals

Sergio Nichiporuk Kulik (born 24 February 1957) is a retired Paraguayan nationalized Chilean football player and manager who played as a striker.

== Playing career ==
Nichiporuk began playing football in the youth teams of Paraná. In 1975, he moved to the capital Asunción, where he made his professional debut with Nacional at the age of 18. Nichiporuk also played for local rivals Presidente Hayes and San Lorenzo, before Ñublense manager Manuel Rodríguez Vega signed him in 1980.

After several seasons playing in the Chilean leagues with Ñublense, Santiago Wanderers and Iquique, Nichiporuk moved to Spain. In January 1983, he joined Mallorca where he made 15 appearances for the club during the 1982–83 Segunda División season.

Nichiporuk joined Magallanes during 1984, but suffered a broken leg which limited his ability to play over the remainder of his career. After a spell with La Serena in 1986, he moved to Mexico to join Atlante F.C. where he made six appearances for the club during the 1987–88 Primera División season. He returned to Chile and finished his career with Lota Schwager, scoring 12 goals during the 1990 season.

== Coaching career ==
A few years after retiring from professional football, Nichiporuk began coaching Tercera División side Municipal Las Condes. In 1995 he began his professional coaching career with Cobresal. He has led Cobresal on several occasions, winning promotion to the Primera División in 1998, and leading the club to a famous victory over Antofagasta on his Clausura 2006 debut. Nichiporuk led Santiago Morning to the 2000 Copa Apertura Final, losing 2–1 to U. de Chile. He also won promotion with Puerto Montt in 2002.
