= 1999 Campeonato Nacional Primera B =

Primera B de Chile
- Season: 1999
- Champions: Unión Española
- Promoted: Unión Española; Santiago Wanderers; Everton; Provincial Osorno
- Relegated: Deportes Colchagua

The 1999 Primera B de Chile was the 49th completed season of soccer of the Primera B de Chile.

Unión Española was tournament’s champion.

== First phase ==
=== League tables ===
Northern Zone
| Pos | Team | Pld | W | D | L | GF | GA | GD | Pts |
|---|---|---|---|---|---|---|---|---|---|
| 1 | Everton | 14 | 8 | 4 | 2 | 19 | 11 | +8 | 28 |
| 2 | Magallanes | 14 | 7 | 3 | 4 | 22 | 13 | +9 | 24 |
| 3 | Santiago Wanderers | 14 | 7 | 3 | 4 | 23 | 15 | +8 | 24 |
| 4 | Deportes Arica | 14 | 5 | 4 | 5 | 14 | 19 | −5 | 19 |
| 5 | Deportes Melipilla | 14 | 5 | 3 | 6 | 20 | 17 | +3 | 18 |
| 6 | Deportes Ovalle | 14 | 4 | 4 | 6 | 9 | 17 | −8 | 16 |
| 7 | Unión San Felipe | 14 | 3 | 5 | 6 | 13 | 16 | −3 | 14 |
| 8 | Deportes Antofagasta | 14 | 2 | 4 | 8 | 16 | 28 | −12 | 10 |

Source: RSSSF

Southern Zone
| Pos | Team | Pld | W | D | L | GF | GA | GD | Pts |
|---|---|---|---|---|---|---|---|---|---|
| 1 | Unión Española | 12 | 7 | 3 | 2 | 26 | 14 | +12 | 24 |
| 2 | Colchagua | 12 | 5 | 3 | 4 | 19 | 17 | +2 | 18 |
| 3 | Provincial Osorno | 12 | 5 | 3 | 4 | 24 | 24 | 0 | 18 |
| 4 | Universidad de Concepción | 12 | 4 | 5 | 3 | 24 | 21 | +3 | 17 |
| 5 | Fernández Vial | 12 | 4 | 4 | 4 | 15 | 9 | +6 | 16 |
| 6 | Ñublense | 12 | 3 | 3 | 6 | 19 | 21 | −2 | 12 |
| 7 | Deportes Linares | 12 | 2 | 3 | 7 | 8 | 29 | −21 | 9 |

Source: RSSSF

== Second phase ==
Half of the first phase points were carried over as bonus points in the second phase.

=== League table ===
| Pos | Team | Pld | W | D | L | GF | GA | GD | BP | Pts | Promotion or relegation |
|---|---|---|---|---|---|---|---|---|---|---|---|
| 1 | Unión Española (C, P) | 28 | 16 | 8 | 4 | 56 | 26 | +30 | 14 | 70 | Promotion to 2000 Primera División |
| 2 | Santiago Wanderers (P) | 28 | 16 | 8 | 4 | 48 | 22 | +26 | 12 | 68 | Promotion to 2000 Primera División |
| 3 | Everton (Q) | 28 | 16 | 6 | 6 | 40 | 26 | +14 | 14 | 68 | Qualification for promotion play-offs |
| 4 | Provincial Osorno (Q) | 28 | 14 | 4 | 10 | 45 | 36 | +9 | 10 | 56 | Qualification for promotion play-offs |
| 5 | Deportes Ovalle | 28 | 12 | 7 | 9 | 43 | 32 | +11 | 8 | 51 | |
| 6 | Deportes Arica | 28 | 11 | 6 | 11 | 35 | 41 | −6 | 10 | 49 | |
| 7 | Deportes Antofagasta | 30 | 12 | 9 | 9 | 36 | 34 | +2 | 5 | 50 | |
| 8 | Deportes Melipilla | 28 | 10 | 8 | 10 | 45 | 36 | +9 | 9 | 47 | |
| 9 | Universidad de Concepción | 28 | 10 | 5 | 13 | 42 | 43 | −1 | 10 | 45 | |
| 10 | Fernández Vial | 28 | 8 | 10 | 10 | 28 | 38 | −10 | 9 | 43 | |
| 11 | Magallanes | 28 | 8 | 6 | 14 | 30 | 45 | −15 | 12 | 42 | |
| 12 | Ñublense | 28 | 8 | 5 | 15 | 28 | 46 | −18 | 7 | 36 | |
| 13 | Deportes Linares | 28 | 7 | 9 | 12 | 35 | 42 | −7 | 5 | 35 | |
| 14 | Unión San Felipe | 28 | 6 | 9 | 13 | 31 | 47 | −16 | 7 | 34 | |
| 15 | Colchagua (R) | 28 | 4 | 6 | 18 | 27 | 55 | −28 | 10 | 28 | Relegation to 2000 Tercera División |

Source: RSSSF
(C) Champions; (P) Promoted; (Q) Qualified for the phase indicated; (R) Relegated

== Promotion/relegation play-offs ==
| 19 December 1999 | Provincial Osorno | 4 – 3 | Cobresal | Estadio Parque Schott |
| | Muñoz 41'; Olea 65' 66'; Soto 83' | | Retamal 24' 69'; Nuñez 59' | Referee: Eduardo Gamboa |

| 19 December 1999 | Everton | 1 – 0 | Deportes Iquique | Estadio Sausalito |
| | Riep 30' | | | Referee: Mario Sánchez |

| 22 December 1999 | Cobresal | 2 – 3 | Provincial Osorno | Estadio El Cobre |
| | Cisternas 15'; Nuñez 70' | | Olea 45'; Díaz 51'; Muñoz 60' | Referee: Rubén Selman |

| 22 December 1999 | Deportes Iquique | 0 – 1 | Everton | Estadio Tierra de Campeones |
| | Pereyra 7' | | | Referee: Mario Sánchez |
