= Frank Carilao =

Chilean footballer (born 1977)

Personal information
- Full name: Frank Patricio Carilao Pinto
- Date of birth: 21 February 1977 (age 49)
- Place of birth: Santiago, Chile
- Height: 1.69 m (5 ft 7 in)
- Position: Defender

Senior career*
| Years | Team | Apps | (Gls) |
| 1999–2004 | Unión La Calera | | |
| 2004–2006 | Everton | | |
| 2007 | Deportes La Serena | | |
| 2008 | San Marcos de Arica | | |
| 2009 | Santiago Wanderers | | |
| 2010 | Deportes Iquique | 35 | (1) |
| 2011 | Unión Temuco | 18 | (0) |
| 2011–2012 | Santiago Morning | 29 | (0) |
- * Club domestic league appearances and goals as of 23 August 2018

Frank Patricio Carilao Pinto (born February 21, 1977) is a former Chilean footballer.

== Titles ==
=== Club ===
Unión La Calera

- Tercera División de Chile (1): 2000

Deportes Iquique

- Copa Chile: 2010
- Primera B: 2010
