= Rodrigo Raín =

Chilean footballer (born 1975)

Personal information
- Full name: Rodrigo Alberto Raín Vejar
- Date of birth: 13 April 1975 (age 51)
- Place of birth: Concepción, Chile
- Height: 1.78 m (5 ft 10 in)
- Position: Defender

Youth career
- Huachipato

Senior career*
| Years | Team | Apps | (Gls) |
| 2000–2002 | Huachipato | 84 | (2) |
| 2003–2006 | Universidad de Concepción | 137 | (13) |
| 2007 | Everton | 15 | (0) |
| 2007–2008 | Cobreloa | 26 | (3) |
| 2008 | Coquimbo Unido | 28 | (2) |
| 2009 | Ñublense | 9 | (0) |
| 2010 | Lota Schwager | 34 | (3) |
| 2011 | Unión La Calera | 0 | (0) |

Managerial career
- 2019: Naval
- * Club domestic league appearances and goals

Rodrigo Alberto Raín Vejar (born 13 April 1975) is a former Chilean footballer who played as centre back. His last club was Unión La Calera.

== Coaching career ==
In 2019, Raín led Naval for one match in the Segunda División Profesional de Chile.

== Personal life ==
Raín is of Mapuche descent.
