= Rodrigo Jara =

Chilean footballer (born 1985)

Personal information
- Full name: Rodrigo Horacio Jara Santana
- Date of birth: 9 April 1985 (age 41)
- Place of birth: Santiago, Chile
- Height: 1.76 m (5 ft 9 in)
- Position: Left-back

Youth career
- Universidad de Chile

Senior career*
Years	Team	Apps	(Gls)
2005–2011	Universidad de Chile	32	(0)
2005	→ La Serena (loan)	12	(0)
2007	→ Cobresal (loan)	17	(1)
2007	→ Fernandez Vial (loan)	14	(0)
2010–2011	→ Cobresal (loan)	46	(0)
2011–2014	Naval	87	(3)
2014–2015	Santiago Morning	29	(0)
2015–2016	Deportes Concepción	11	(0)
2016–2017	Puerto Montt	16	(1)
2017–2019	Deportes Copiapó	35	(1)
- * Club domestic league appearances and goals

Rodrigo Horacio Jara Santana (born 9 April 1985) is a Chilean former professional footballer who played as a left-back.

A product of the Universidad de Chile youth system, he played for several Chilean clubs, including Cobresal, Naval de Talcahuano, Santiago Morning, Deportes Concepción, Deportes Puerto Montt and Deportes Copiapó.

== Career ==
Jara was developed in the youth system of Universidad de Chile.

Jara featured regularly during Universidad de Chile's run to the final of the 2006 Apertura. He started both legs of the championship final against Colo-Colo, playing at left-back as Universidad de Chile lost the title following a penalty shoot-out. He had also started the second leg of the semi-final against Huachipato, which secured Universidad de Chile's place in the final.

Jara returned to Cobresal for the 2010 season. He became a regular in the team coached by former Universidad de Chile midfielder Luis Musrri, making 28 league appearances during the campaign. Cobresal's own historical records also list Jara among the club's defensive reinforcements for the season.

In July 2011, Jara joined Naval de Talcahuano for the Primera B Clausura. Cooperativa described him as one of three new reinforcements signed by Naval ahead of the tournament, alongside Johanns Dulcien and Nicolás Millán.

After leaving Naval, he joined Santiago Morning in 2014 and subsequently moved to Deportes Concepción in 2015. Jara later represented Deportes Puerto Montt during the 2016–17 Primera B season, scoring once for the club.

In 2017, Jara joined Deportes Copiapó, where he spent the final seasons of his professional career. He retired from professional football in 2019.

== Honours ==
Universidad de Chile

- Primera División de Chile: 2009 Apertura
