= Víctor Osorio (footballer) =

Chilean footballer (born 1984)

Personal information
- Full name: Víctor Alexis Osorio Alfaro
- Date of birth: 27 July 1984 (age 42)
- Place of birth: Vicuña, Chile
- Height: 1.76 m (5 ft 9 in)
- Position: Midfielder

Senior career*
Years	Team	Apps	(Gls)
2003–2006	Coquimbo Unido	99	(2)
2007–2010	Cobreloa	23	(4)
2011	Cobresal	20	(1)
2012	Coquimbo Unido	27	(0)
2012–2014	Deportes Copiapó	11	(0)
Total		180	(7)
- * Club domestic league appearances and goals

Víctor Alexis Osorio Alfaro (born 27 July 1984) is a Chilean former professional footballer who played as midfielder.

== Honours ==
Coquimbo Unido

- Primera División de Chile: runner-up 2005 Apertura
