= Carlos San Martín (footballer) =

Argentine footballer

Personal information
- Full name: Carlos Aníbal San Martín
- Date of birth: 2 July 1971 (age 55)
- Place of birth: La Plata, Argentina
- Position: Goalkeeper

Team information
- Current team: Melgar (gk coach)

Youth career
- Estudiantes

Senior career*
| Years | Team | Apps | (Gls) |
| 1991–1992 | Estudiantes | | |
| 1993–1995 | Cambaceres | | |
| 1996–1999 | Defensa y Justicia | | |
| 1999–2005 | Audax Italiano | 163 | (0) |
| 2006 | Everton | 35 | (0) |
| 2007–2008 | La Plata FC | 22 | (0) |

Managerial career
- 2007: Estudiantes (gk coach)
- 2008: Independiente (gk coach)
- 2009–2010: Argentinos Juniors (gk coach)
- 2010: Boca Juniors (gk coach)
- 2011–2012: Chile (gk coach)
- 2014: Argentinos Juniors (gk coach)
- 2016: Gimnasia LP (gk coach)
- 2017: Huracán (gk coach)
- 2017: Al Hilal (gk coach)
- 2018: Tigre (gk coach)
- 2019: Gimnasia LP (gk coach)
- 2019–2021: Defensa y Justicia (gk coach)
- 2024–: Melgar (gk coach)
- * Club domestic league appearances and goals

Carlos Aníbal San Martín (born 2 July 1971) is an Argentine former professional footballer who played as a goalkeeper in clubs of Argentina and Chile. After retirement, he worked as an assistant goalkeeper coach in the Chile national team under Claudio Borghi.

== Teams (Player) ==
- (Argentina) Estudiantes de La Plata 1991–1992
- (Argentina) Defensores de Cambaceres 1993–1995
- (Argentina) Defensa y Justicia 1996–1999
- (Chile) Audax Italiano 1999–2005
- (Chile) Everton 2006
- (Argentina) La Plata FC 2007-2008

== Teams (Coach) ==
- (Argentina) Estudiantes de La Plata (gk coach) 2007
- (Argentina) Independiente (gk coach) 2008
- (Argentina) Argentinos Juniors (gk coach) 2009–2010
- (Argentina) Boca Juniors (gk coach) 2010
- Chile (gk coach) 2011–2012
- (Argentina) Argentinos Juniors (gk coach) 2014
- (Argentina) Gimnasia y Esgrima de La Plata (gk coach) 2016
- (Argentina) Huracán (gk coach) 2017
- (Saudi Arabia) Al Hilal (gk coach) 2017
- (Argentina) Tigre (gk coach) 2018
- (Argentina) Gimnasia y Esgrima de La Plata (gk coach) 2019
- (Argentina) Defensa y Justicia (gk coach) 2019–2021
- (Peru) Melgar (gk coach) 2024–Present
