= Nicolás Sartori =

Argentine footballer

Personal information
- Full name: Nicolás Sartori Iparraguirre
- Date of birth: 23 May 1976 (age 50)
- Place of birth: Los Toldos, Argentina
- Height: 1.78 m (5 ft 10 in)
- Position: Defender

Senior career*
Years	Team	Apps	(Gls)
1997–2000	Ferro Carril Oeste	87	(6)
2000–2001	Gimnasia de Jujuy	27	(2)
2001–2002	León	33	(2)
2003–2004	The Strongest	61	(4)
2005	Chacarita Juniors	11	(1)
2005–2006	Huracán	20	(1)
2006	Universidad de Chile	3	(0)
2007	Wilstermann	17	(2)
2008	Real Potosí	10	(0)
2008–2009	Sarmiento	23	(0)
2009–2010	C.A.I.	25	(1)
2010	Alvear FBC	–	(–)
2010	P.E.F. Matienzo	–	(–)
2011	Berazategui	1	(0)
- * Club domestic league appearances and goals

Nicolás Sartori Iparraguirre (born 23 May 1976 in Los Toldos) is an Argentine former football defender.

== Teams ==
- (Argentina) Ferro Carril Oeste 1997–2000
- (Argentina) Gimnasia y Esgrima de Jujuy 2000–2001
- (Mexico) León 2001–2002
- (Bolivia) The Strongest 2003–2004
- (Argentina) Chacarita Juniors 2005
- (Argentina) Huracán 2005–2006
- Universidad de Chile 2006
- (Bolivia) Jorge Wilstermann 2007
- (Bolivia) Real Potosí 2008
- (Argentina) Sarmiento de Junín 2008–2009
- (Argentina) C.A.I. 2009–2010
- (Argentina) Alvear FBC 2010
- (Argentina) P.E.F. Matienzo 2010
- (Argentina) Berazategui 2011
