= Álvaro Sarabia =

Chilean footballer (born 1978)

Personal information
- Full name: Álvaro Gustavo Sarabia Navarro
- Date of birth: January 5, 1978 (age 48)
- Place of birth: Santiago, Chile
- Height: 1.78 m (5 ft 10 in)
- Position: Striker

Senior career*
Years	Team	Apps	(Gls)
1997–2000	Colo-Colo	4	(0)
2001	Fernández Vial		
2002–2005	Deportes Puerto Montt	80	(27)
2005	Chiapas	12	(1)
2006–2007	Palestino	40	(8)
2008–2009	Rangers	20	(1)
2009	Palestino	10	(1)
2010	Lota Schwager	27	(7)
2011	Deportes Puerto Montt	6	(1)

International career
1997	Chile U20		
- * Club domestic league appearances and goals

Álvaro Gustavo Sarabia Navarro (born 5 January 1978) is a Chilean former footballer.

His last club was Deportes Puerto Montt, then member of the Primera B de Chile

== Club career ==
Sarabia joined Colo-Colo lower divisions at early age, being promoted to the first adult team in 1997. In 2000, he moved to Arturo Fernández Vial of the Chilean second division.

In 2002, Sarabia signed for Puerto Montt, team of the Chilean Second Division in this time. He completed a good performance in the club, achieving the second division title, promoting to the Chilean Primera División.

His Primera División debut with Puerto Montt came on 2 March 2003, in a 1–0 home win to Palestino, and scored his first goal in Primera on 27 April against his former club Colo-Colo, in a 1–1 draw. Other important goal of Sarabia in the team was against other biggest club of Chile: Universidad Católica once in a 1–1 draw. In the next season, Sarabia scored 9 goals in 31 appearances in all of the season.

Sarabia lived his best moment of his career in the season 2005, being the goalscorer of the team and of the tournament with 13 goals. After of his Puerto Montt performances, he was transferred to the Mexican club Chiapas.

In Jaguares de Chiapas, Sarabia only scored 1 goal in 12 appearances, returning to Chile to play with Palestino the Torneo de Apertura 2006. In his club debut against Coquimbo Unido, he scored in the 3–1 victory to this club. However, he only scored 3 goals in 6 games, due to an injury that he suffered. In the Clausura, he did not play in all tournaments. In the next season, he played few games with the club, being transferred to Rangers de Talca in 2008.

== International career ==
Sarabia represented Chile at under-20 level in the 1997 South American Championship.

== Personal life ==
Following his retirement, he made his home in Dalcahue, Los Lagos Region, and has worked as a chauffeur.

== Honours ==
=== Individual ===
- Primera División de Chile Top-scorer (1): 2005 Apertura
