= Patricio Aguilera =

Chilean footballer (born 1987)

Personal information
- Full name: Patricio Andrés Aguilera Cuadro
- Date of birth: 11 February 1987 (age 39)
- Place of birth: Santiago, Chile
- Height: 1.75 m (5 ft 9 in)
- Position: Midfielder

Youth career
- Universidad Católica

Senior career*
Years	Team	Apps	(Gls)
2006–2010	Universidad Católica	8	(0)
2007–2008	→ Deportes Antofagasta (loan)	42	(0)
2009	→ Unión Temuco (loan)	0	(0)
2010	→ Universidad de Concepción (loan)	26	(1)
2011	Santiago Morning	5	(1)
2011	San Marcos	9	(2)
2012	Unión Temuco	27	(0)
2013	Naval	8	(1)
Total		125	(5)
- * Club domestic league appearances and goals

Patricio Andrés Aguilera Cuadro (born 11 February 1987) is a Chilean former footballer who played as a midfielder.

== Honours ==
Unión Temuco

- Tercera A: 2009
