= Francisco Cañete =

Chilean footballer (born 1976)

Personal information
- Full name: Francisco Javier Cañete Ramírez
- Date of birth: 5 November 1976 (age 49)
- Height: 1.68 m (5 ft 6 in)
- Position: Defender

Senior career*
Years	Team	Apps	(Gls)
1994–1996	Colo-Colo		
1997	Unión San Felipe	23	(1)
1998–2002	Santiago Morning	94	(7)
2003	Cobresal	33	(0)
2004	Unión La Calera		
2005	La Serena	8	(0)
2005	Everton	5	(1)
- * Club domestic league appearances and goals

Francisco Javier Cañete Ramírez (born 5 November 1976) is a Chilean former footballer who played as a defender for Chilean clubs Colo-Colo (1994–1996), Unión San Felipe (1997), Santiago Morning (1998–2002), Cobresal (2003), Unión La Calera (2004), La Serena (2005) and Everton (2005).
