= Luis Flores (Bolivian footballer) =

Bolivian footballer (born 2002)

Personal information
- Full name: Luis Ángel Flores Pereira
- Date of birth: 19 September 2002 (age 24)
- Place of birth: Bolivia
- Height: 1.70 m (5 ft 7 in)
- Position: Defender

Youth career
- Telento Export
- Novorizontino
- Bolívar

Senior career*
Years	Team	Apps	(Gls)
2020–2021	Bolívar	1	(0)
2022	Nacional Potosí	0	(0)
- * Club domestic league appearances and goals as of 19:41, 23 June 2021 (UTC)

Luis Ángel Flores Pereira (born 19 September 2002) is a Bolivian footballer who plays as a defender.

== Career ==
=== Club career ===
Flores started playing football at Telento Export in Bolivia. He later joined Brazilian club Grêmio Novorizontino. However, he was later forced to return to Bolivia due to an injury. He ended up joining Club Bolívar after he returned home and began playing for the reserve team. Shortly after, he was also summoned to the Bolivian U-17 national team where he sat on the bench in four 2019 South American U-17 Championship games, without making his debut.

Ahead of the 2021 season, Flores became a permanent part of the first team squad. Flores made his professional debut for Club Bolívar on 13 March 2021 against Guabirá. Ahead of the 2022 season, Flores moved to fellow league club Nacional Potosí.
