= Patricio Schwob =

Chilean footballer (born 1986)

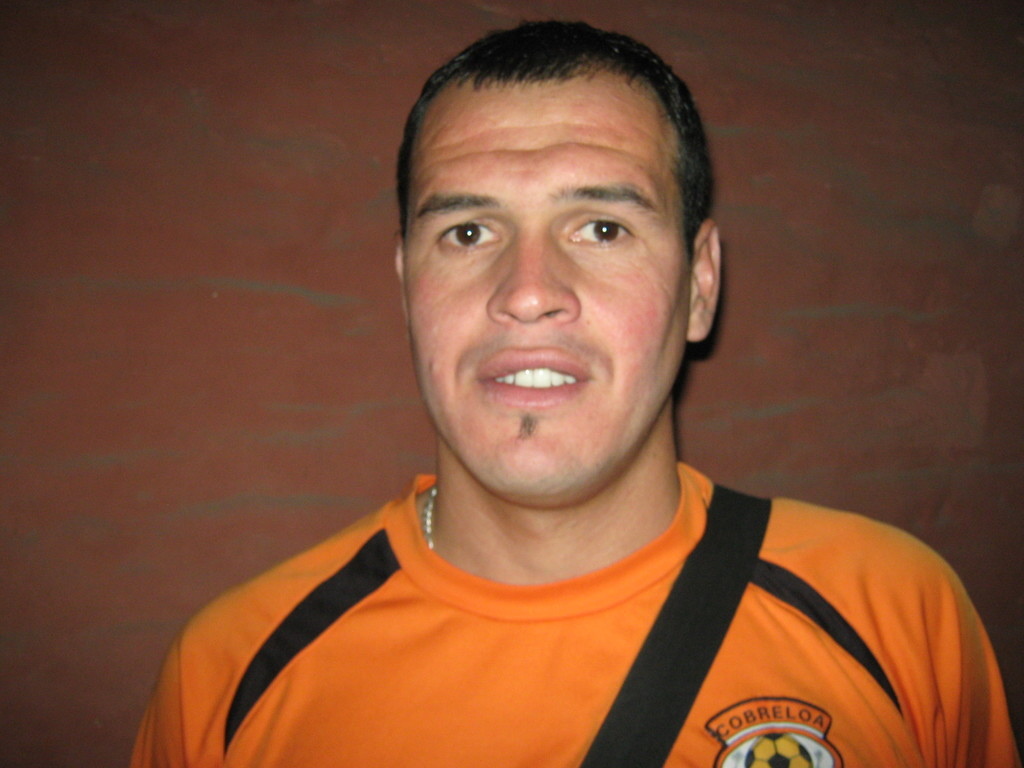

Personal information
- Full name: Patricio David Schwob León
- Date of birth: 14 April 1986 (age 40)
- Place of birth: Santiago, Chile
- Height: 1.80 m (5 ft 11 in)
- Position: Striker

Youth career
- Talagante (city team)

Senior career*
Years	Team	Apps	(Gls)
2005	Deportes Arica	12	(4)
2006–2007	Magallanes	31	(15)
2008	Trasandino	38	(20)
2009	Iberia	26	(11)
2010	Deportes Puerto Montt	33	(10)
2011	Cobreloa	20	(3)
2012	Deportes Concepción	18	(9)
2013	Unión Temuco	10	(5)
2013–2014	Deportes Temuco	26	(7)
2014–2015	Curicó Unido	29	(9)
2015–2016	Unión San Felipe	13	(2)
2016–2017	Deportes Pintana	19	(2)
Total		275	(97)
- * Club domestic league appearances and goals

Patricio David Schwob León (born 14 April 1986) is a Chilean former footballer who played as a striker. His last club was Deportes Pintana.

== Career ==
As a player of Talagante city team, he joined Deportes Arica in the Primera B de Chile at the age of nineteen. Schwob played at all categories of the Chilean football, and retired in 2017 after playing for Deportes Pintana.

== Personal life ==
Schwob is of German descent.

After retiring from football and developing several jobs in his homeland, Schwob moved to the United States at the end of 2022 thanks to a friend and works in new car parking.
