= Sebastián Aset =

Argentine footballer

Personal information
- Full name: Sebastián Eduardo Aset Merino
- Date of birth: 25 April 1979 (age 47)
- Place of birth: Mendoza, Argentina
- Height: 1.87 m (6 ft 1 1/2 in)
- Position: Forward

Senior career*
Years	Team	Apps	(Gls)
1999–2000	Tristán Suárez		
2000	Hertha BSC		
2001	El Tanque Sisley		
2002	Unión San Felipe		
2003–2004	Lota Schwager		
2004	PSIM Yogyakarta		
2005	UA Maracaibo		
2005	Juventud Unida		
2006	Cooma Tigers FC		
2006	Deportivo Guaymallén		
2007	Cobresal		
2008	Progreso		
2008	Fernández Vial		
- * Club domestic league appearances and goals as of 22 March 2020

Sebastián Eduardo Aset Merino (born 25 April 1979) is a former Argentine footballer who played as a forward in club football in Argentina, Chile, Uruguay, Venezuela, Germany, Australia and Indonesia.

== Career ==
Born in General Alvear, Buenos Aires Province, Aset began playing professional football in the lower divisions of Argentine football. He would embark on a journeyman's career, enjoying a spell in the Chilean Primera División with Cobresal during 2007. He joined C.A. Progreso during the 2007–08 Uruguayan Primera División season, scoring a game-winning goal against C.A. Fénix in an unsuccessful attempt to avoid relegation.
