= Joel Reyes =

Chilean footballer (born 1972)

Personal information
- Full name: Joel Antonio Reyes Zúñiga
- Date of birth: 8 April 1972 (age 54)
- Place of birth: Peñaflor, Chile
- Height: 1.76 m (5 ft 9 in)
- Position: Defensive midfielder

Youth career
- Audax Italiano

Senior career*
Years	Team	Apps	(Gls)
1993–1995	Deportes Los Andes	?	(?)
1996	Colchagua	25	(0)
1997	Deportes Antofagasta	?	(?)
1997	Ñublense	?	(?)
1998–1999	Unión San Felipe	?	(?)
1999–2001	Santiago Morning	73	(5)
2002–2003	Colo-Colo	34	(0)
2004	U. de Concepción	23	(0)
2005–2006	Unión Española	53	(3)
2007	Everton	36	(0)
2008–2010	Ñublense	85	(1)
2011	Santiago Morning	8	(0)

International career^{‡}
2000–2005	Chile	5	(0)
- * Club domestic league appearances and goals as of 31 March 2012 ‡ National team caps and goals as of 14 September 2008

Joel Antonio Reyes Zúñiga (born 8 April 1972) is a Chilean former footballer who played as defensive midfielder. His last professional club was Santiago Morning.

Reyes was the first signing of a Chilean club in bankruptcy after accepting play for Colo-Colo in 2002, year which was champion. He has received five caps with the Chile national team.

He is nicknamed Pelao, which means bonehead in Chilean Spanish.

== Club career ==
Born in Peñaflor, he started his career at Chilean second-tier side Deportes Colchagua in January 1999 aged 26, a very late age for began to play football. However, on mid-year, Reyes was signed by first-tier club Santiago Morning, being the following season runner–up of the 2000 Copa Chile.

In 2002, he joined Chilean powerhouse Colo-Colo and helped the team to win the Torneo Clausura during its bankruptcy period. In 2004, he moved to Universidad de Concepción to play the Copa Libertadores, which was the club's first ever participation in it.

In January 2005, after a season in Concepción, he signed for Unión Española. There he added another honour to his palmares, having reached the Torneo Apertura. In late 2006, he finished his contract with Unión and joined Everton.

On 8 January 2008, after reaching an agreement to terminate his contract with Everton, Reyes signed a contract with Ñublense. An undisputed starter in Chillán–based side, he became the team’s captain and was part of the club’s only one team in play an international tournament after (2008 Copa Sudamericana).

In December 2010, he ended his contract with Ñublense and then joined first-tier Santiago Morning, which was his last club. He left Santiago Morning after its relegation.

== Honours ==
=== Club ===
Santiago Morning

- Copa Chile: Runner–up 2000

Colo-Colo

- Primera División de Chile (1): 2002 Clausura

Unión Española

- Primera División de Chile (1): 2005 Apertura
