= Víctor Loyola =

Chilean footballer (born 1981)

Personal information
- Full name: Víctor Jesús Alfredo Loyola Pando
- Date of birth: 22 September 1981 (age 45)
- Place of birth: Santiago, Chile
- Height: 1.82 m (5 ft 11 1/2 in)
- Positions: Goalkeeper; forward

Youth career
- 1993–2001: Colo-Colo

Senior career*
Years	Team	Apps	(Gls)
2000–2005	Colo-Colo	13	(0)
2001	→ Unión Española (loan)	15	(0)
2005	Puerto Montt	6	(0)
2006–2011	Santiago Morning	68	(2)
2007	→ Audax Italiano (loan)	7	(0)
2010	→ Cobreloa (loan)	4	(0)
Total		113	(2)
- * Club domestic league appearances and goals

Víctor Jesús Alfredo Loyola Pando (born 22 June 1981) is a Chilean retired footballer who played as a goalkeeper and occasionally as a forward.

== Football career ==
Born in Santiago, Loyola started his career with local Colo-Colo, spending five seasons at the club which included a loan at Unión Española. He subsequently joined Deportes Puerto Montt.

In 2006, Loyola signed for Santiago Morning. On 25 November 2009, in the last minute of the Clausura away fixture against Audax Italiano (where he had previously played on loan), he scored through a header in an eventual 1–2 loss and semi-finals qualification on the away goals rule, after having been brought on as a substitute forward by manager Juan Antonio Pizzi.

Santiago Morning also loaned Loyola to Cobreloa. On 22 May 2011, back with the latter but now as a goalkeeper, he netted his team's goal in a 1–1 Apertura home draw precisely against the former, in another injury-time header. On 15 June, in a friendly with former side Colo-Colo, his individual effort was the game's first goal in a 2–1 win, and he also announced his intention to spend the following Clausura entirely as a forward; on 10 July, for the Copa Chile, the forward scored his second goal since being fully reconverted by manager Fernando Díaz, in a 1–1 draw at Unión San Felipe.

Loyola retired midway through 2012 at the age of 31, due to numerous back problems.

== Honours ==
Colo-Colo

- Primera División de Chile: 2002 Clausura
