= 2012 Torneo Apertura (Primera B de Chile) =

Primera B de Chile
- Season: 2012 Primera B
- Champions: San Marcos de Arica

The 2012 Torneo Apertura was part of the 62nd completed season of the Primera B de Chile.

San Marcos de Arica was tournament's champion.

== League table ==
Pos	Team	Pld	W	D	L	GF	GA	GD	Pts
1	San Marcos de Arica	19	10	6	3	39	21	+18	36
2	Ñublense	19	9	7	3	33	26	+7	34
3	Barnechea	19	10	3	6	33	26	+7	33
4	Deportes Concepción	19	8	6	5	29	17	+12	30
5	Everton	19	9	2	8	34	26	+8	29
6	San Luis de Quillota	19	7	5	7	28	31	−3	26
7	Unión Temuco	19	6	7	6	21	24	−3	25
8	Lota Schwager	19	6	6	7	23	26	−3	24
9	Coquimbo Unido	19	6	5	8	26	29	−3	23
10	Deportes Puerto Montt	19	6	4	9	23	32	−9	22
11	Magallanes	19	6	3	10	16	27	−11	21
12	Naval	19	5	6	8	25	25	0	21
13	Curicó Unido	19	5	6	8	21	31	−10	21
14	Santiago Morning	19	4	6	9	24	34	−10	18

Source: rsssf.com
