= César Díaz (footballer, born 1975) =

Chilean footballer (born 1975)

Personal information
- Full name: César Antonio Díaz Escobar
- Date of birth: 20 June 1975 (age 51)
- Place of birth: Santiago, Chile
- Height: 1.76 m (5 ft 9 in)
- Position: Forward

Youth career
- Panamericano K8

Senior career*
Years	Team	Apps	(Gls)
1992–1993	Compañía de Teléfonos	–	(–)
1994–1997	Palestino	56	(21)
1997–2000	Cobreloa	64	(23)
2001	Audax Italiano	20	(5)
2002	Santiago Morning	25	(2)
2003	Coquimbo Unido	23	(7)
2004	Deportes Temuco	38	(30)
2005	Santiago Wanderers	17	(8)
2005–2007	Cobresal	63	(36)
2008	Deportes Melipilla	29	(10)
2009–2010	Curicó Unido	50	(13)
2011	Deportes Antofagasta	19	(3)
Total		404	(158)
- * Club domestic league appearances and goals

César Antonio Díaz Escobar (born 20 June 1975) is a Chilean former professional footballer, who played as a forward, and current manager.

== Playing career ==
Born in Santiago, Díaz was with Panamericano K8 from San Miguel before starting his career with Compañía de Teléfonos (CTC) in the Chilean Tercera División. He played for 12 clubs during a 20-year professional career. Later, he played for Club Deportivo Palestino in 1994, moving to Cobreloa after four seasons.

Díaz went on to represent, in his country's top division but also in the second, Audax Italiano, Santiago Morning, Coquimbo Unido, Deportes Temuco, Santiago Wanderers, Cobresal, Deportes Melipilla, Curicó Unido and Deportes Antofagasta, retiring at the age of 36. He scored his last goal on 4 September 2011 in a 5–0 away win against Deportes Copiapó and, in 2005, was crowned joint-top scorer to help Cobresal to the sixth overall position.

== Coaching career ==
In December 2022, Díaz assumed as coach of free agents at the INAF (National Football Institute), the trade union of players in the Chilean football.

== Honours ==
Individual

- Chilean Primera División top scorer: 2005 Clausura
