= Pablo Bolados =

Chilean footballer (born 1978)

Personal information
- Full name: Pablo Alejandro Bolados Valenzuela
- Date of birth: 8 December 1978 (age 47)
- Place of birth: Concepción, Chile
- Height: 1.78 m (5 ft 10 in)
- Position: Midfielder

Senior career*
| Years | Team | Apps | (Gls) |
| 1997–1998 | Santiago Morning | | |
| 1999–2000 | Concepción | | |
| 2001–2003 | Fernández Vial | | |
| 2004–2005 | Puerto Montt | | |
| 2006–2010 | Deportes La Serena | | |
| 2007 | → Cobreloa (loan) | | |
| 2007 | → Ñublense (loan) | | |
| 2010 | Curicó Unido | | |
| 2011 | San Luis de Quillota | | |
| 2012 | Deportes Copiapó | | |
- * Club domestic league appearances and goals

Pablo Alejandro Bolados Valenzuela (born 8 December 1978) is a Chilean former footballer who played as a midfielder.

He played for clubs like Deportes La Serena or Deportes Copiapó.
