= Luis Ignacio Quinteros =

Chilean footballer (born 1979)

Personal information
- Full name: Luis Ignacio Quinteros Gasset
- Date of birth: 23 April 1979 (age 47)
- Place of birth: Santiago, Chile
- Height: 1.71 m (5 ft 7 in)
- Position: Forward

Youth career
- Colo-Colo

Senior career*
Years	Team	Apps	(Gls)
1996–2003	Colo-Colo	78	(39)
1999–2000	Colo-Colo Juniors	–	(–)
2001	→ Deportes Temuco (loan)	–	(–)
2003–2005	Puebla	70	(26)
2005–2006	Universidad Católica	32	(11)
2006–2007	León	34	(15)
2007	Colón	14	(1)
2008	Gimnasia LP	8	(0)
2008	Lobos BUAP	14	(4)
2009–2010	Huachipato	32	(9)
2010–2011	Unión Temuco	42	(18)
2011–2012	Unión La Calera	22	(2)
2013	Deportes Copiapó	20	(5)
Total		366	(130)

International career
2004	Chile	2	(0)
- * Club domestic league appearances and goals

Luis Ignacio Quinteros Gasset (born 23 April 1979) is a former Chilean football striker.

His previous clubs include Colo-Colo, Universidad Católica and Huachipato in Chile, Colón de Santa Fe and Gimnasia de La Plata in Argentina and Mexican sides Puebla F.C. and Club León.

== Honours ==
=== Club ===
Colo-Colo

- Primera División de Chile (4): 1996, 1997 Clausura, 1998, 2002 Clausura
- Copa Chile (1): 1996

Deportes Temuco

- Primera B (1): 2001

Universidad Católica

- Primera División de Chile (1): 2005 Clausura
