= Carlos Mina =

Colombian footballer (born 1971)

Carlos Mina (born February 1, 1971, in Bogotá, Colombia) is a Colombian naturalized Chilean former professional footballer who played as a defender for clubs of Colombia and Chile.

== Teams ==
- (Colombia) Deportivo Cali 1990–1991
- (Chile) Huachipato 1992–1993
- (Colombia) Deportivo Cali 1994
- (Chile) Huachipato 1994–1995
- (Chile) Deportes Linares 1996–1997
- (Chile) San Marcos de Arica 1998
- (Chile) Deportes Linares 1999–2001
- (Chile) Deportes Antofagasta 2002–2003
- (Chile) Provincial Osorno 2004–2005
- (Chile) Deportes Temuco 2006–2007
