= Marco Olea =

Chilean footballer (born 1979)

Personal information
- Full name: Marco Andrés Olea Hueche
- Date of birth: 24 March 1979 (age 47)
- Place of birth: Temuco, Chile
- Height: 1.73 m (5 ft 8 in)
- Position: Striker

Team information
- Current team: Deportes Iquique (women) (manager)

Senior career*
Years	Team	Apps	(Gls)
1999–2002	Audax Italiano	79	(20)
1999	→ Provincial Osorno (loan)	30	(22)
2003	Universidad de Concepción	36	(16)
2004–2005	Universidad de Chile	78	(27)
2006	O'Higgins	39	(11)
2007	Everton	40	(6)
2008	Cobresal	36	(16)
2009	Lobos BUAP	16	(2)
2009	Palestino	15	(3)
2010	Deportes Iquique	24	(3)
2011	Deportes Copiapó	25	(0)
2012	Provincial Osorno	14	(7)
2012–2013	Deportes Puerto Montt	13	(1)

International career
2001	Chile		

Managerial career
- 2020: Cultural Maipú
- 2021: Santiago Morning (women)
- 2022–2023: Cultural Maipú
- 2025: Universidad de Concepción (women)
- 2026–: Deportes Iquique (women)
- * Club domestic league appearances and goals

Marco Andrés Olea Hueche (born 24 March 1979) is a Chilean football manager and former footballer. He is currently in charge of Deportes Iquique (women).

== Playing career ==
Olea represented the Chile national team in the 0–1 loss against Catalonia on 28 December 2001.

== Coaching career ==
From April to July 2021, Olea coached Santiago Morning (women). In the second half of 2022, he became the manager of Cultural Maipú in the Tercera B, the fifth level of the Chilean football league system.

In May 2025, Olea was appointed the manager of Universidad de Concepción (women). The next year, he switched to Deportes Iquique.

== Personal life ==
On his maternal line, Olea is of Mapuche descent, since his last surname, Hueche (or Weche), means "young" in Mapudungun.

As a footballer, he was nicknamed El Caballero del Gol (The Gentleman of the Goal) due to the fact that he used to put on a tie to celebrate his goals since he played for Universidad de Concepción.

He has stated that cooking is also his passion. So, he took part in the first season of the cooking TV show Master Chef Chile in 2014.

== Honours ==
=== Player ===
Universidad de Chile

- Primera División de Chile (1): 2004 Apertura

Deportes Iquique

- Copa Chile: 2010
- Primera B: 2010

Individual

- Primera B Top-Scorer: 1999
