= Marcelo Lucero =

Chilean footballer (born 1980)

Marcelo Lucero (born February 10, 1980, in San Vicente de Tagua Tagua, Chile) is a Chilean footballer who played as a midfielder for Rangers de Talca of the Chilean Primera División during the 2008 season.

== Teams ==
- (Chile) O'Higgins 2005–2006
- (Chile) Rangers 2007–2008
- (Chile) Provincial Osorno 2009
- (Chile) Curicó Unido 2010–2011
- (Chile) Naval 2012
