= Carlos Ortega (footballer) =

Chilean footballer (born 1973)

Personal information
- Full name: Carlos Alberto Ortega Ferrada
- Date of birth: 25 March 1973 (age 53)
- Place of birth: Tomé, Chile
- Height: 1.83 m (6 ft 0 in)
- Position: Goalkeeper

Senior career*
| Years | Team | Apps | (Gls) |
| 1991–2001 | Huachipato | 118 | (0) |
| 2002–2003 | U. de Concepción | 35 | (0) |
| 2004–2006 | Cobreloa | 92 | (0) |
| 2007–2009 | Antofagasta | 86 | (0) |
- * Club domestic league appearances and goals as of 1 May 2020

Carlos Alberto Ortega Ferrada (born 25 March 1973) was a Chilean footballer who played as goalkeeper.

== Club career ==
On 30 December 2003, he joined Cobreloa. On 13 June 2006, was reported that Universidad de Chile would have him in their plans, which is why they proposed their Bolivian goalkeeper, José Carlo Fernández, as their replacement in Cobreloa.

In 2007, he left the club after three years and signed for Deportes Antofagasta.

== Honours ==
=== Club ===
Cobreloa

- Primera División de Chile (1): 2004 Clausura
