= Alejandro Osorio (footballer) =

Chilean footballer (born 1976)

Personal information
- Full name: Luis Alejandro Osorio González
- Date of birth: 24 September 1976 (age 50)
- Place of birth: Rancagua, Chile
- Height: 1.70 m (5 ft 7 in)
- Position: Midfielder

Youth career
- O'Higgins

Senior career*
Years	Team	Apps	(Gls)
1995	O'Higgins		
1996–1999	Universidad Católica	120	(17)
1999–2002	Estudiantes LP	91	(6)
2003–2004	Beira-Mar	7	(0)
2004–2006	Universidad Católica	69	(2)
2007	Deportes Antofagasta	19	(1)
2007	Deportes Concepción	17	(0)
2008	Ñublense	26	(1)
2009	Cobreloa	0	(0)

International career
1993	Chile U17		
1995	Chile U20		
1996	Chile U23		
1997–2001	Chile	8	(0)

Managerial career
- 2012: Academia Machalí
- * Club domestic league appearances and goals

Luis Alejandro Osorio González (born 24 September 1976), commonly known as Alejandro Osorio or sometimes Janino, is a Chilean former professional footballer who played as a midfielder.

== Club career ==
Flywheel offensive plays by right and his current team is Cobreloa of the First Division Chile. He was champion of the Apertura 1997 tournament and the 2005 Clausura tournament with Universidad Católica.

== International career ==
Osorio played for Chile in both the 1993 FIFA U17 World Championship in Japan, where Chile reached the third place, and the 1995 FIFA U20 Championship in Qatar. In addition, he took part of Chile squad in the 1993 South American U17 Championship

At under-23 level, he represented Chile in the 1996 Pre-Olympic Tournament.

At senior level, he made eight appearances for Chile between 1997 and 2001, including both the 1997 and the 2001 Copa América.

== Coaching career ==
In 2012, Osorio worked as the manager of Academia Machalí in the Tercera B, the fifth level of the Chilean football league system.

== Personal life ==
On his mother side, he is the cousin of former footballer and also product of O'Higgins, Darío Gálvez.

== Honours ==
Universidad Católica

- Primera División de Chile: 1997 Apertura, 2005 Clausura

Chile U17

- FIFA U-17 World Cup third place: 1993
