= Luis Flores Manzor =

Chilean footballer (born 1982)

Personal information
- Full name: Luis Alexis Flores Manzor
- Date of birth: 12 February 1982 (age 44)
- Place of birth: Rancagua, Chile
- Position: Midfielder

Senior career*
Years	Team	Apps	(Gls)
2001–2002	O'Higgins		
2003	Universidad de Chile		
2004–2007	O'Higgins		
2008–2009	Cobresal		
2010–2012	Rangers de Talca		

Managerial career
- 2013: Rangers de Talca (coach)
- * Club domestic league appearances and goals

Luis Alexis Flores Manzor (born 12 February 1982) is a Chilean former professional footballer who played as a midfielder for many different clubs in Chile.
