= Joel Estay =

Chilean footballer (born 1978)

Personal information
- Full name: Joel Antonio Estay Silva
- Date of birth: 12 March 1978 (age 48)
- Place of birth: Cabildo, Chile
- Height: 1.76 m (5 ft 9 in)
- Position: Striker

Senior career*
| Years | Team | Apps | (Gls) |
| 1999 | Deportes La Ligua | ? | (?) |
| 2000–2003 | Unión La Calera | ? | (?) |
| 2003 | Palestino | ? | (?) |
| 2004 | Universidad Católica | ? | (?) |
| 2005–2006 | Everton | 48 | (27) |
| 2007 | La Serena | 36 | (12) |
| 2008–2009 | Unión La Calera | ? | (?) |
| 2010–2014 | San Marcos | 56 | (34) |
| 2010 | → Ñublense (loan) | 7 | (1) |
| 2014–2015 | Deportes Concepción | 19 | (2) |
| 2015–2016 | Trasandino | 23 | (4) |
- * Club domestic league appearances and goals as of 23 August 2018

Joel Antonio Estay Silva (Spanish pronunciation: [xoˈel esˈtaj ˈsilβa], born 12 March 1978) is a Chilean former footballer.

== Honours ==
=== Club ===
Unión La Calera

- Tercera División (1): 2000

San Marcos de Arica

- Primera B de Chile (2): 2012, 2013–14

=== Individual ===
- Primera División Top Scorer (1): 2005 Apertura
- Primera B Top Scorer (1): 2008
