= 2008 Campeonato Nacional Primera B =

Primera B de Chile
- Season: 2008
- Champions: Curicó Unido
- Promoted: Curicó Unido; Deportes Iquique
- Relegated: Arturo Fernández Vial
- Top goalscorer: Joel Estay (27)

The 2008 Primera B de Chile was the 58th completed season of the Primera B de Chile.

Curicó Unido — tournament’s champion — reached its first ever promotion to top-tier in its 35-year existence, whilst the second promoted was Deportes Iquique after beating Coquimbo Unido in the promotion playoffs. Nevertheless Arturo Fernández Vial was relegated to the Tercera División following 26 years at the professionalism.

== Table ==
Pos	Team	Pld	W	D	L	GF	GA	GD	Pts	Promotion or relegation
1	Curicó Unido	44	23	9	12	50	38	+12	78	Promoted to 2009 Campeonato Nacional season
2	Deportes Puerto Montt	44	21	9	14	57	43	+14	72	Promotion Playoffs
3	Coquimbo Unido	44	20	11	13	67	52	+15	71	Category's Promotion Playoffs
4	Deportes Iquique	44	18	14	12	50	41	+9	68	Category's Promotion Playoffs
5	San Marcos de Arica	44	18	13	13	65	66	−1	67	
6	Lota Schwager	44	15	14	15	59	61	−2	59	
7	Unión La Calera	44	16	9	19	70	71	−1	57	
8	Unión San Felipe	44	16	9	19	57	59	−2	57	
9	Santiago Wanderers	44	15	12	17	57	55	+2	57	
10	San Luis Quillota	44	13	10	21	50	73	−23	49	
11	Deportes Copiapó	44	11	12	21	42	55	−13	45	
12	Arturo Fernández Vial	44	10	14	20	49	64	−15	44	Relegated to Tercera División

== See also ==
- Chilean football league system
