= 2005 Torneo Apertura (Chile) =

Campeonato Nacional Apertura Copa Banco del Estado
- Season: 2005
- Dates: 21 January – 9 July 2005
- Champions: Unión Española (7th title)
- 2006 Copa Libertadores: Unión Española
- 2005 Copa Sudamericana: Universidad Católica (Regular season 1st); Universidad de Chile (Regular season 2nd)
- Matches played: 206
- Goals scored: 591 (2.87 per match)
- Top goalscorer: Joel Estay; Álvaro Sarabia; Héctor Mancilla (13 goals)
- Biggest home win: U. Católica 5–0 D. Melipilla (23 January); Cobreloa 5–0 D. La Serena (13 May)
- Biggest away win: D. La Serena 3–7 Colo-Colo (19 February)
- Highest attendance: 58,000; U. de Chile 1–1 Colo-Colo (10 April)
- Total attendance: 834,387
- Average attendance: 4,050

The 2005 Campeonato Nacional Apertura Copa Banco del Estado was the 77th Chilean League top flight, in which Unión Española won its 7th league title after beating Coquimbo Unido in the finals.

== Qualifying stage ==
=== Results ===
	AUD	CLO	CSA	COL	DCO	COQ	EVE	HUA	DLS	DME	PAL	DPM	RAN	SFE	DTE	UCA	UCH	UCO	UES	SWA
Audax		3–0	3–2	1–1			1–1			1–3	0–2			1–1	1–2					1–1
Cobreloa			2–1		2–1	4–0			5–0		1–0	4–3	1–1	1–1	5–4		1–1			
Cobresal					0–1	2–1	2–2		0–1			3–0				0–0	2–4	1–0	4–3	
Colo-Colo		2–0	2–2			2–0	2–1	1–0		2–2		2–0					1–1	0–1	4–2	
Concepción	0–2			2–0				1–1		0–0	2–0	1–1				1–0		1–2		2–1
Coquimbo	1–0				2–0						2–1	4–1	1–0	1–0		0–3	1–3	3–1		3–1
Everton		1–0			1–0	0–1		1–3	3–1			3–2	1–3		3–0		3–2	1–1		
Huachipato	2–0	5–4	0–2			3–2			4–1	3–0		1–4	0–1	2–0			1–0			
La Serena	1–1			3–7	2–2	2–2				1–0	4–0					0–1		2–0		2–3
Melipilla		0–1	1–2			0–1	0–3				1–3			1–0	0–0		1–1		1–2	
Palestino			0–0	1–0			1–1	2–3				0–3	3–1	1–2		0–1			2–3	
Puerto Montt	2–2								3–0	0–1			1–2	1–0	1–1	1–2	0–1			3–1
Rangers	2–0		2–3	3–2	1–1				1–2	1–1						1–3		1–1	0–0	0–2
San Felipe			1–2	2–3	3–1		02		0–0				0–1		1–0	0–2			2–1	3–2
Temuco			1–1	1–2	1–1	2–1		1–2	1–1		1–1		1–1			1–2			1–2	
U. Católica	2–1	4–1		1–0			1–2	2–0		5–0								5–2	1–1	3–0
U. de Chile	3–1				1–0				1–3		2–0		1–2	2–0	3–2	2–1				3–0
U. Concepción	3–0	0–1						2–0		1–2	0–2	4–3		2–0	3–3		0–3		0–0	
U. Española	3–3	1–0			1–2	4–2	2–2	2–1	1–2			4–1					0–2			0–1
S. Wanderers		1–2	1–3	1–1			4–1	2–0		3–0	1–2				0–1			3–0		

=== Group standings ===
==== Group A ====
Pos	Team	Pld	W	D	L	GF	GA	GD	Pts	Qualification
1	Colo-Colo	19	9	5	5	34	24	+10	32	Qualify to the playoffs
2	Huachipato	19	10	1	8	31	28	+3	31	Qualify to the playoffs
3	Unión San Felipe	19	5	3	11	16	26	−10	18	
4	Deportes Melipilla	19	4	5	10	14	30	−16	17	
5	Audax Italiano	19	3	7	9	22	32	−10	16	

==== Group B ====
Pos	Team	Pld	W	D	L	GF	GA	GD	Pts	Qualification
1	Cobreloa	19	10	3	6	35	29	+6	33	Qualify to the playoffs
2	Coquimbo Unido	19	9	2	8	29	27	+2	29	Qualify to the repechaje
3	Deportes La Serena	19	7	5	7	28	35	−7	26	
4	Santiago Wanderers	19	7	2	10	28	30	−2	23	
5	Deportes Puerto Montt	19	5	3	11	30	36	−6	18	

==== Group C ====
Pos	Team	Pld	W	D	L	GF	GA	GD	Pts	Qualification
1	Unión Española	19	7	5	7	32	31	+1	26	Qualify to the playoffs
2	Deportes Concepción	19	6	7	6	20	21	−1	25	Qualify to the repechaje
3	Universidad de Concepción	19	6	4	9	23	31	−8	22	
4	CD Palestino	19	5	3	11	30	36	−6	18	
5	Deportes Temuco	19	3	8	8	24	31	−7	17	

==== Group D ====
Pos	Team	Pld	W	D	L	GF	GA	GD	Pts	Qualification
1	Universidad Católica	19	14	2	3	39	13	+26	44	Qualify to the playoffs
2	Universidad de Chile	19	12	3	4	36	19	+17	39	Qualify to the playoffs
3	Cobresal	19	9	5	5	32	25	+7	32	Qualify to the repechaje
4	Everton	19	8	6	5	32	27	+5	30	Qualify to the repechaje
5	Rangers	19	7	7	5	24	23	+1	28	

=== Aggregate table ===
Pos	Team	Pld	W	D	L	GF	GA	GD	Pts	Qualification
1	Universidad Católica	19	14	2	3	39	13	+26	44	Playoffs
2	Universidad de Chile	19	12	3	4	36	19	+17	39	Playoffs
3	Cobreloa	19	10	3	6	35	29	+6	33	Playoffs
4	Colo-Colo	19	9	5	5	34	24	+10	32	Playoffs
5	Cobresal	19	9	5	5	32	25	+7	32	Repechaje
6	Huachipato	19	10	1	8	31	28	+3	31	Playoffs
7	Everton	19	8	6	5	32	27	+5	30	Repechaje
8	Coquimbo Unido	19	9	2	8	29	27	+2	29	Repechaje
9	Rangers	19	7	7	5	24	23	+1	28	
10	Unión Española	19	7	5	7	32	31	+1	26	Playoffs
11	Deportes La Serena	19	7	5	7	28	35	−7	26	
12	Deportes Concepción	19	6	7	6	20	21	−1	25	Repechaje
13	Santiago Wanderers	19	7	2	10	28	30	−2	23	
14	Universidad de Concepción	19	6	4	9	23	31	−8	22	
15	Palestino	19	6	3	10	21	28	−7	21	
16	Deportes Puerto Montt	19	5	3	11	30	36	−6	18	
17	Unión San Felipe	19	5	3	11	16	26	−10	18	
18	Deportes Temuco	19	3	8	8	24	31	−7	17	
19	Deportes Melipilla	19	4	5	10	14	30	−16	17	
20	Audax Italiano	19	3	7	9	22	32	−10	16	

==== Repechaje ====
Match	Home	Visitor	Result
1	Coquimbo Unido	Everton	2–1
2	Deportes Concepción	Cobresal	4–3

== Playoffs ==
Quarterfinals
1	Universidad Católica	2	4	6
12	Deportes Concepción	1	1	2
2	Universidad de Chile	2	0	2 (2)
10	Unión Española (p)	1	1	2 (3)
3	Cobreloa	0	1	1
8	Coquimbo Unido	1	1	2
4	Colo-Colo	0	0	0
6	Huachipato	4	1	5

Semifinals
1	Universidad Católica	0	1	1 (9)
10	Unión Española (p)	0	1	1 (10)
8	Coquimbo Unido	2	1	3
6	Huachipato	1	1	2

Finals
10	Unión Española	1	3	4
8	Coquimbo Unido	0	2	2

== Finals ==
=== First leg ===
3 July 2005
17:10 (UTC-4)

Unión Española	1 – 0	Coquimbo Unido
Neira 76'

Estadio Santa Laura, Santiago
Attendance: 14,000
Referee: P. Pozo
9 July 2005
19:10 (UTC-4)

Coquimbo Unido	2 – 3	Unión Española
Robles 13', 62'		43' Neira; 52' Ribera; 88' (pen.) Sierra

Estadio Francisco Sánchez, Coquimbo
Attendance: 11,000
Referee: R. Selman

2005 Campeonato Nacional
Apertura winners
Unión Española
7th title

== Top goalscorers ==
Rank	Player	Club	Goals
1	(Chile) Joel Estay	Everton	13
1	(Chile) Álvaro Sarabia	Deportes Puerto Montt	13
1	(Chile) Héctor Mancilla	Huachipato	13
4	(Chile) José Luis Villanueva	Universidad Católica	12
5	(Chile) Marcelo Corrales	Coquimbo Unido	11
6	(Chile) Manuel Neira	Unión Española	10
6	(Chile) Marco Olea	Universidad de Chile	10
