= Francis Ferrero =

Argentine footballer (born 1972)

Personal information
- Full name: Francis Ricardo Ferrero Fidalgo
- Date of birth: 1 October 1972 (age 54)
- Place of birth: San Luis, Argentina
- Height: 1.73 m (5 ft 8 in)
- Position: Forward

Youth career
- Toritos de Chiclana

Senior career*
Years	Team	Apps	(Gls)
1993	Villa Dálmine	–	(–)
1994–1997	Deportes Puerto Montt		
1996	→ Colo-Colo (loan)		
1998	Colo-Colo		
1998	Santiago Wanderers	13	(6)
1999–2000	Santiago Morning	25	(6)
2001	Deportes Puerto Montt	10	(3)
2001	Deportivo Italchacao	11	(3)
2002–2005	Unión San Felipe	52	(29)
2003	→ Real Zacatecas (loan)	15	(5)
2004	→ Coquimbo Unido (loan)	21	(3)
2006	Unión Española	9	(0)
2007–2008	Santiago Morning		
- * Club domestic league appearances and goals

Francis Ricardo Ferrero Fidalgo (born October 1, 1972) is an Argentine naturalized Chilean former footballer who played in Chile, Mexico and Venezuela.

== Personal life ==
He naturalized Chilean by residence.

== Honours ==
Colo-Colo

- Chilean Primera División: 1996
- Copa Chile: 1996
