= 2007 Santiago Wanderers season =

Santiago Wanderers
2007 season
- President: (Chile) Carlos Bombal
- Coaches: (Chile) Hernán Godoy (Apertura) (Chile) Yuri Fernández (Clausura)
- Stadium: Estadio Regional Chiledeportes
- Torneo Apertura: 20th
- Torneo Clausura: 19th (5th in Group A)
Home colours	Away colours

The 2007 season is Santiago Wanderers 81st season in the Primera División, the 44th in the Campeonato Nacional and the 8th consecutive season since their last promotion in 1999. This article shows player statistics and all matches, official and friendly, that the club played during the 2007 season.

In a season made to commemorate its 115th anniversary, the club had a poor performance during the year, by finishing the Torneo Apertura in 20th position with 13 points and the Torneo Clausura in 5th place of the Group A with 17 points. As a consequence, Santiago Wanderers was relegated to Primera B for the 2008 season, after finishing the year table in 20th position with 30 points.

This season marked the sixth time in history that Wanderers was relegated to Primera B, after their previous relegations in 1977, 1980, 1984, 1991 and 1998.

== Squad ==
Note: Flags indicate national team as defined under FIFA eligibility rules; some limited exceptions apply. Players may hold more than one non-FIFA nationality.

No.	Pos.	Nation	Player
2	DF	CHI	Christian Gálvez
3	DF	CHI	Juan Robledo
4	DF	CHI	Franco Salinas
5	DF	CHI	Sebastian Méndez
6	DF	CHI	Roberto Luco
7	FW	CHI	Paulo Pérez
8	FW	CHI	Victor Quintanilla
9	FW	CHI	José Alberto Soto
10	MF	CHI	Miguel Catalán
11	FW	CHI	José Luis Jiménez
14	MF	CHI	Hernán Godoy
15	MF	PAR	Victor Hugo Avalos

No.	Pos.	Nation	Player
16	MF	CHI	José Catalan
17	MF	CHI	Mauricio Tampe
18	FW	CHI	Juan Silva
19	FW	ARG	Luis Alberto Benitez
20	FW	CHI	Jaime Grondona
22	FW	CHI	Martin Fabbro
23	FW	CHI	Michael Silva
24	DF	CHI	Sebastián Roco
25	GK	CHI	Francisco Prieto (captain)
29	DF	CHI	Eric Godoy
30	DF	CHI	Francisco Arancibia
32	GK	CHI	David Reyes

== Transfers ==
=== Apertura 2007 ===
In

- (Paraguay) Richard Benítez (from (Chile) Deportes Antofagasta)
- (Chile) Juan Robledo (from (Chile) Santiago Morning)
- (Chile) Mauricio Tampe (from (Chile) Cobresal)
- (Paraguay) Víctor Hugo Ávalos (from (Chile) Curicó Unido)
- (Argentina) Luis Benítez (on loan from (Argentina) Racing Club)

Out

- (Chile) Luis Oyarzún (to (Chile) O'Higgins)
- (Chile) José Contreras (to (Chile) Huachipato)
- (Chile) Alejandro Carrasco (to (Chile) Deportes Melipilla)
- (Chile) Roberto Luco (on loan to (Chile) Trasandino)

=== Clausura 2007 ===
In

- (Argentina) Pablo Fontanello (from (Argentina) Tigre)
- (Chile) José Miguel Farías (from (Chile) Ñublense)
- (Chile) Patricio Monsalves (from (Chile) Universidad de Concepción)
- (Chile) Víctor Cancino (from (Chile) Coquimbo Unido)
- (Argentina) Javier Robles (on loan from (Argentina) Vélez Sarsfield)
- (Argentina) Daniel Fernández (from (Chile) Coquimbo Unido)
- (Chile) Sergio Zúñiga (free agent)

Out

- (Paraguay) Víctor Hugo Ávalos (to (Chile) Fernández Vial)
- (Chile) Felipe Valderrama (to (Chile) Everton)
- (Argentina) Luis Benítez (to (Argentina) Racing Club)
- (Chile) Michael Silva (to (Mexico) Club León)

=== Post-season (2008) ===
Out

- (Chile) Juan Robledo (to (Sweden) Mjällby AIF)
- (Chile) José Soto (to (Chile) Deportes Concepción)

== Competitions ==
=== Friendlies ===
Mid-season

23 May 2007 Friendly	Santiago Wanderers	4–1	Palestino	Villa Alemana
15:30	R. Benítez 9'; L. Benítez 43'; Soto 46', 50'	Report	Díaz 35'	Stadium: Estadio Ítalo Composto; Attendance: 500

=== Torneo Apertura ===
==== Standings ====
Pos	Team	Pld	W	D	L	GF	GA	GD	Pts
17	Universidad de Concepción	20	4	5	11	25	33	−8	17
18	Deportes Puerto Montt	20	4	2	14	19	40	−21	14
19	Coquimbo Unido	20	4	2	14	18	40	−22	14
20	Santiago Wanderers (Note: Santiago Wanderers were docked three points for not paying their players on time in November 2006)	20	4	4	12	24	33	−9	13
21	Lota Schwager	20	2	6	12	28	52	−24	12

Source: Asociación Nacional de Fútbol Profesional

==== Results summary ====
Overall								Home						Away					
Pld	W	D	L	GF	GA	GD	Pts	W	D	L	GF	GA	GD	W	D	L	GF	GA	GD
20	4	4	12	24	33	−9	13	4	3	3	16	13	+3	0	1	9	8	20	−12

Source: RSSSF

==== Matches ====
The schedule for the Apertura tournament was unveiled on 26 January 2007. Wanderers debuted against Universidad Católica.

Win Tie Loss

28 January 2007 1	Universidad Católica	1–0	Santiago Wanderers	Las Condes, Santiago
17:00	Núñez 84'	Report		Stadium: San Carlos de Apoquindo; Attendance: 4,474; Referee: Jorge Osorio

3 February 2007 2	O'Higgins	3–2	Santiago Wanderers	Rancagua
	Diez 7'; Aceval 39' (pen.); Rojas 78'	Report	Jiménez 24' (pen.); Godoy 30'	Stadium: El Teniente

10 February 2007 3	Santiago Wanderers	0–0	Deportes Antofagasta	Valparaíso
21:00		Report		Stadium: Playa Ancha

18 February 2007 4	Deportes Concepción	1–0	Santiago Wanderers	Concepción
	Ibarrola 13'	Report		Stadium: Collao

25 February 2007 5	Santiago Wanderers	1–1	Deportes Puerto Montt	Viña del Mar
17:00	Catalán 31'	Report	Ramírez 54'	Stadium: Sausalito

28 February 2007 6	Santiago Wanderers	3–1	Coquimbo Unido	Viña del Mar
	Pérez 28', 34'; Roco 56'	Report	Flores 50'	Stadium: Sausalito

4 March 2007 7	Huachipato	1–0	Santiago Wanderers	Talcahuano
17:00	González 56'	Report		Stadium: Las Higueras

11 March 2007 8	Santiago Wanderers	3–2	Deportes Melipilla	Valparaíso
	Roco 14'; Soto 31' (pen.); Jiménez 90+4' (pen.)	Report	Henríquez 9'; Vrsalovic 51'	Stadium: Playa Ancha; Referee: Patricio Polic

18 March 2007 9	Everton	1–1	Santiago Wanderers	Viña del Mar
	Sánchez 32'	Report	Roco 68'	Stadium: Sausalito; Attendance: 16,000; Referee: Pablo Pozo

1 April 2007 10	Santiago Wanderers	1–1	Cobreloa	Valparaíso
16:00	Roco 82'	Report	Aránguiz 59'	Stadium: Playa Ancha

4 April 2007 11	Universidad de Concepción	3–1	Santiago Wanderers	Concepción
	Monje 34'; Parada 79'; Segura 81'	Report	Soto 82'	Stadium: Collao

8 April 2007 12	Santiago Wanderers	0–2	Universidad de Chile	Valparaíso
12:00		Report	Galaz 64'; Soto 73'	Stadium: Playa Ancha

13	Bye

21 April 2007 14	Santiago Wanderers	1–2	Audax Italiano	Valparaíso
	Jiménez 62' (pen.)	Report	Scotti 48', 85'	Stadium: Playa Ancha

29 April 2007 15	Deportes La Serena	2–1	Santiago Wanderers	La Serena
12:00	Culio 24' (pen.); Canales 67'	Report	Catalán 65'	Stadium: La Portada

6 May 2007 16	Santiago Wanderers	1–2	Palestino	Valparaíso
16:00	Soto 88'	Report	Toloza 26'; Núñez 79'	Stadium: Playa Ancha

12 May 2007 17	Colo-Colo	3–1	Santiago Wanderers	Macul, Santiago
18:30	Suazo 9'; Sanhueza 63'; Sánchez 67'	Report	Pérez 87'	Stadium: Monumental; Attendance: 50,000; Referee: Jorge Osorio

19 May 2007 18	Santiago Wanderers	5–2	Lota Schwager	Valparaíso
	Jiménez 8' (pen.); Pérez 15' (pen.); Silva 39'; Ávalos 65'; Soto 90+2'	Report	Salcedo 12'; Mardones 35'	Stadium: Playa Ancha; Referee: Manuel Acosta

27 May 2007 19	Cobresal	3–1	Santiago Wanderers	El Salvador
12:00	Díaz 9'; Oyarzún 10'; Lira 40'	Report	Jiménez 4'	Stadium: El Cobre

10 June 2007 20	Santiago Wanderers	1–0	Unión Española	Valparaíso
	Godoy 64'	Report		Stadium: Playa Ancha

17 June 2007 21	Ñublense	2–1	Santiago Wanderers	Chillán
15:30	Viveros 41'; Ibarra 54' (pen.)	Report	Benítez 13'	Stadium: Nelson Oyarzún

=== Torneo Clausura ===
==== Standings ====
Overall table

Pos	Team	Pld	W	D	L	GF	GA	GD	Pts
17	Lota Schwager	20	4	7	9	22	28	−6	19
18	Unión Española	20	4	5	11	26	36	−10	17
19	Santiago Wanderers	20	4	5	11	15	43	−28	17
20	Everton	20	3	4	13	20	36	−16	13
21	Coquimbo Unido	20	4	1	15	18	37	−19	13

Source: rsssf.com

Group 1

Pos	Team	Pld	W	D	L	GF	GA	GD	Pts	Qualification
1	Colo-Colo	20	11	6	3	40	21	+19	39	Playoffs
2	Cobresal	20	8	8	4	31	23	+8	32	Playoffs
3	Palestino	20	6	6	8	27	23	+4	24	
4	Deportes La Serena	20	6	4	10	25	33	−8	22	
5	Santiago Wanderers	20	4	5	11	15	43	−28	17	

==== Results summary ====
Overall								Home						Away					
Pld	W	D	L	GF	GA	GD	Pts	W	D	L	GF	GA	GD	W	D	L	GF	GA	GD
20	4	5	11	15	43	−28	17	3	2	5	9	17	−8	1	3	6	6	26	−20

Source: RSSSF

==== Matches ====
Win Tie Loss

22 July 2007 1	Santiago Wanderers	1–0	Universidad Católica	Valparaíso
16:00	Jiménez 14'	Report		Stadium: Playa Ancha; Attendance: 2,918; Referee: Eduardo Ponce

29 July 2007 2	Santiago Wanderers	2–3	O'Higgins	Valparaíso
15:30	Fontanello 2'; P. Pérez 36'; Cancino (red card) 73'	Report	González 68'; Varas 80'; Pereira 81'	Stadium: Playa Ancha; Attendance: 3,311; Referee: Claudio Fuenzalida

5 August 2007 3	Deportes Antofagasta	5–0	Santiago Wanderers	Antofagasta
15:30	Donoso 11' (pen.); Castillo 19'; Arancibia 59'; Olivares 80'; Guerrero 90' (pen.)	Report		Stadium: Regional; Attendance: 3,000; Referee: Patricio Polic

11 August 2007 4	Santiago Wanderers	0–0	Deportes Concepción	Valparaíso
18:00		Report		Stadium: Playa Ancha; Attendance: 2,339; Referee: Rubén Selman

15 August 2007 5	Deportes Puerto Montt	0–0	Santiago Wanderers	Puerto Montt
15:30		Report		Stadium: Chinquihue; Attendance: 2,190; Referee: Eduardo Ponce

19 August 2007 6	Coquimbo Unido	0–3	Santiago Wanderers	Coquimbo
16:00		Report	Roco 19'; Jiménez 53'; Silva 87'	Stadium: Francisco Sánchez Rumoroso; Attendance: 3,000; Referee: Carlos Chandía

25 August 2007 7	Santiago Wanderers	0–1	Huachipato	Valparaíso
18:00		Report	Riveros 85'	Stadium: Playa Ancha; Attendance: 3,034; Referee: Manuel Acosta

2 September 2007 8	Deportes Melipilla	3–0	Santiago Wanderers	Melipilla
16:00	de Gregorio 4'; Lagunas 13'; Berríos 80'	Report		Stadium: Roberto Bravo Santibáñez; Attendance: 2,825; Referee: Álvaro García

16 September 2007 9	Santiago Wanderers	2–1	Everton	Valparaíso
12:00	Silva 13'; Prieto (red card) 80'; Muñoz 90'	Report	Urbano 46'	Stadium: Playa Ancha; Attendance: 7,985; Referee: Carlos Chandía

22 September 2007 10	Cobreloa	1–0	Santiago Wanderers	Calama
16:00	Meneses (red card) 60'; Canío 90'	Report	Arancibia (red card) 60'	Stadium: Municipal; Attendance: 2,442; Referee: Claudio Fuenzalida

25 September 2007 11	Santiago Wanderers	0–3	Universidad de Concepción	Valparaíso
20:00		Report	Lorenzetti 4'; Reinoso 15'; Maciel 62'	Stadium: Playa Ancha; Attendance: 1,933; Referee: Pablo Pozo

30 September 2007 12	Universidad de Chile	2–0	Santiago Wanderers	Ñuñoa, Santiago
18:00	Hernández 54'; Pinto 74'	Report	Gálvez (red card) 59'	Stadium: Nacional; Attendance: 15,000; Referee: Guido Aros

13	Bye

7 October 2007 14	Audax Italiano	7–1	Santiago Wanderers	La Florida, Santiago
16:00	Orellana 21', 57'; Villanueva 38' (pen.); Di Santo 60', 81'; Scotti 64'; Romero 72'	Report	P. Pérez 70'	Stadium: Municipal; Attendance: 1,800; Referee: Enrique Osses

20 October 2007 15	Santiago Wanderers	3–2	Deportes La Serena	Valparaíso
20:00	Jiménez 8'; Méndez 47', 72'	Report	Carreño 17'; Barros 66'	Stadium: Playa Ancha; Attendance: 2,576; Referee: Claudio Puga

24 October 2007 16	Palestino	6–0	Santiago Wanderers	La Cisterna, Santiago
15:30	Maldonado 9', 76'; Úbeda 23', 40', 72'; Rivarola 84'	Report		Stadium: Municipal; Attendance: 1,000; Referee: Eduardo Ponce

27 October 2007 17	Santiago Wanderers	0–4	Colo-Colo	Valparaíso
17:00		Report	Fierro 17'; Millar 23', 46'; Hernández 72'	Stadium: Playa Ancha; Attendance: 6,368; Referee: Rubén Selman

31 October 2007 18	Lota Schwager	1–1	Santiago Wanderers	Coronel
17:00	Sáez 57'	Report	Godoy 59'	Stadium: Estadio Federico Schwager; Attendance: 1,262; Referee: Carlos Chandía

4 November 2007 19	Santiago Wanderers	1–1	Cobresal	Valparaíso
17:00	Muñoz 88'	Report	C. Pérez 42'	Stadium: Playa Ancha; Attendance: 3,624; Referee: Guido Aros

11 November 2007 20	Unión Española	1–1	Santiago Wanderers	Independencia, Santiago
18:00	Cáceres 20'	Report	P. Pérez 14'	Stadium: Santa Laura; Attendance: 2,000; Referee: Eduardo Ponce

25 November 2007 21	Santiago Wanderers	0–2	Ñublense	Valparaíso
17:00		Report	Villalobos 36', 66'	Stadium: Playa Ancha; Attendance: 6,979; Referee: Enrique Osses

=== Relegation table ===
Pos	Team	Pld	W	D	L	GF	GA	GD	Pts	Qualification or relegation
17	Everton	40	9	12	19	44	63	−19	39	
18	Deportes Puerto Montt	40	9	8	23	37	62	−25	35	Plays Relegation/promotion Liguilla
19	Lota Schwager	40	6	13	21	50	80	−30	31	Relegated to Primera B
20	Santiago Wanderers	40	8	9	23	39	76	−37	30 (Note: 3 points deducted due to financial issues)	Relegated to Primera B
21	Coquimbo Unido	40	8	3	29	36	77	−41	27	Relegated to Primera B
