= Mauricio Neveu =

Chilean footballer

Personal information
- Full name: Mauricio Alberto Neveu León
- Date of birth: 23 February 1979 (age 47)
- Place of birth: Viña del Mar, Chile
- Height: 1.73 m (5 ft 8 in)
- Position: Defensive midfielder

Youth career
- Flecha Verde
- 1990–1998: Santiago Wanderers

Senior career*
Years	Team	Apps	(Gls)
1998–2003	Santiago Wanderers	117	(4)
2000	Santiago Wanderers B		
2003–2004	PSMS Medan		
2004	Hòa Phát Hà Nội		
2005–2006	Dardania Lausanne		
2007	FC Epalinges		
2008–2012	FC Chile Sport		

International career
1999	Chile U20	4	(0)
- * Club domestic league appearances and goals

Mauricio Alberto Neveu León (born 23 February 1979) is a Chilean former professional footballer who played as a defensive midfielder.

== Club career ==
Born in Viña del Mar, Chile, Neveu was with club Flecha Verde from Quilpué before joining the Santiago Wanderers youth system at the age of eleven, coinciding with players such as Reinaldo Navia and David Pizarro. He made his professional debut thanks to the coach Pedro García in a match against Coquimbo Unido in 1998.

In his homeland, he developed his career with Santiago Wanderers from 1998 to 2003, all seasons in the Chilean top division, except in 1999 when the club played at the second level and became the runner-up of the league. He took part in the 2001 league title, scoring a goal, and the 2002 Copa Libertadores. He also played for the B-team in the 2000 Tercera División alongside fellows such as Jorge Ormeño, Joel Soto and Mauricio Rojas.

He moved abroad in 2004 and joined Indonesian club PSMS Medan thanks to the agent Nelson León Sánchez with Juan Rodríguez Vega as coach. In the same year, he switched to Vietnamese club Hòa Phát Hà Nội.

From 2005 to 2012, he played in Switzerland for Dardania Lausanne (2005–06), FC Epalinges (2007) and FC Chile Sport (2008–12).

== International career ==
Neveu represented Chile U20 in the 1999 South American Championship in Argentina, making four appearances.

== Post-retirement ==
Back in Chile, Neveu joined Club Deportivo Flecha Verde as coach at youth level and vice president.
