= Diego Díaz =

Diego Díaz may refer to:

- Diego Diaz, character in the American TV series Kingdom
- Diego Díaz (Spanish footballer) (born 1968), Spanish former football goalkeeper
- Diego Díaz Ahumada (born 1986), Chilean former football defender
- Diego Díaz García (born 1988), Chilean football defender
- Diego Díaz Núñez (born 1996), Chilean football midfielder
- Diego Valentín Díaz (died 1660), Spanish painter
- Diego Díaz (footballer, born 2005), Spanish football midfielder and winger
- Diego Díaz (footballer, born 2007), Spanish football goalkeeper
