= Roberto Luco =

Roberto Luco can refer to:

- Roberto Luco (footballer, born 1907)
- Roberto Luco (footballer, born 1985)
