= Christian Gálvez =

Christian Gálvez may refer to:

- Christian Gálvez (footballer) (born 1979), Chilean football defender
- Christian Gálvez (TV presenter) (born 1980), Spanish television presenter and writer
