= Emanuel Reynoso =

Emanuel Reynoso may refer to:

- Emanuel Reynoso (footballer, born 1983), Argentine footballer
- Emanuel Reynoso (footballer, born 1995), Argentine footballer
