= Rodrigo Araya =

Chilean footballer

Personal information
- Full name: Rodrigo Fabián Araya Moreno
- Date of birth: 8 August 1972 (age 54)
- Place of birth: Santiago, Chile
- Position: Midfielder

Senior career*
Years	Team	Apps	(Gls)
1994–1998	Persma Manado		
1999–2000	Arema Malang		
2001	Persijatim Jakarta Timur		(5)
2002	PSM Makassar		(4)
2003	Arema Malang		(4)
2004	Persema Malang		(5)
2005–2008	Persibom Kotamobagu		(6)
- * Club domestic league appearances and goals

Rodrigo Fabián Araya Moreno (born 8 October 1972) is a Chilean former professional footballer who played as a midfielder for clubs in Indonesia.

== Career ==
Born in Santiago, Chile, Araya came to Indonesia in 1994 and began his career with Persma Manado, where he coincided with his compatriots Juan Rodríguez Rubio and Nelson León Sánchez.

Then he moved to Arema Malang, where he is considered a historical player and captain and coincided with his compatriots Juan and Francisco Rodríguez Rubio, sons of Juan Rodríguez Vega. They are well remembered by the club fans.

He also played for Persijatim Jakarta Timur, PSM Makassar, Persema Malang and Persibom Kotamobagu.

== Personal life ==
Araya married Indonesian Yanti Manossoh and made his home in Jakarta. They have two children and the first of them was born in Malang.
