= Mauricio Rojas (footballer) =

Chilean footballer (born 1978)

Personal information
- Full name: Mauricio Javier Rojas Toro
- Date of birth: 30 March 1978 (age 48)
- Place of birth: Quilpue, Chile
- Height: 1.79 m (5 ft 10 in)
- Position: Midfielder

Youth career
- Manuel Rodríguez
- Santiago Wanderers

Senior career*
Years	Team	Apps	(Gls)
1999–2005	Santiago Wanderers	166	(10)
1998	→ San Luis (loan)	–	(–)
1999–2000	Santiago Wanderers B	–	(–)
2005–2006	Audax Italiano	41	(2)
2007	Cobresal	37	(0)
2008	Unión Española	24	(0)
2009–2010	San Luis	7	(0)
2011–2012	Unión Temuco	1	(0)
Total		276	(12)

International career
2000	Chile U23	1	(0)
2001	Chile B	1	(0)

Managerial career
- 2014: Provincial Marga Marga
- 2018: Santiago Wanderers U13
- * Club domestic league appearances and goals

Mauricio Javier Rojas Toro (born 30 March 1978) is a Chilean former professional football midfielder, who could also play as a defender.

== Club career ==
A product of the Santiago Wanderers youth system, Rojas played for them in the top division; the second division. He also played for the B-team in the 2000 Tercera División alongside fellows such as Mauricio Neveu, Jorge Ormeño and Joel Soto.

== International career ==
Rojas was a member of the bronze winning Chile national team at the 2000 Summer Olympics in Sydney, Australia. He started his professional career at Santiago Wanderers in Valparaíso.

He made an appearance for the Chile B national team in the friendly match against Catalonia on 28 December 2001.

== Honours ==
Santiago Wanderers

- Primera División de Chile: 2001

Chile

- Olympic Games bronze medal: 2000
