= Juan Rodríguez Rubio =

Chilean footballer (born 1968)

Personal information
- Full name: Juan Manuel Rodríguez Rubio
- Date of birth: 19 October 1968 (age 58)
- Place of birth: Santiago, Chile
- Position: Defensive midfielder

Youth career
- Colo-Colo
- Coquimbo Unido

Senior career*
Years	Team	Apps	(Gls)
1985–1987	Coquimbo Unido		
1988–1990	Deportes Valdivia		
1991–1993	Santiago Wanderers		
1994	Municipal Talagante	–	(–)
1995	Deportes Melipilla	6	(0)
1995–1996	Persma Manado		
1996–1997	Arema Malang		(1)
1998–1999	Gombak United		
1999–2000	Arema Malang		
2001	PSDS Deli Serdang		(1)
2002	Gelora Putra Delta		(1)
2003	Persikab Bandung		(0)
- * Club domestic league appearances and goals

Juan Manuel Rodríguez Rubio (born 19 October 1968), also known as Juan Rubio, is a Chilean former professional footballer who played as a defensive midfielder for clubs in Chile and Indonesia.

== Career ==
Born in Santiago, Rodríguez Rubio is a product of both Colo-Colo and Coquimbo Unido youth systems. He made his professional debut with Coquimbo Unido when his father, Juan Sr., was the coach.

In Chile, he also played for Deportes Valdivia, Santiago Wanderers, Municipal Talagante and Deportes Melipilla at all divisions, before moving to Indonesia.

In 1995, he joined Persma Manado and switched to Arema Malang in 1996, staying with the club until 2000, with a stint in Singapore playing for Gombak United in 1998–99. In Persma Manado, he coincided with his compatriots Rodrigo Araya and Nelson León Sánchez. In Arema Malang, he coincided with Araya and León Sánchez again, in addition to his younger brother, Francisco, and Julio César Moreno.

He is noted for introducing the song Vamos Leones (Let's go Lions), sung by fans of Universidad de Chile, to Arema Malang fans who changed the words to Come on, come on Arema. The song later spread across Indonesia with the lyrics being changed to suit their respective clubs by Indonesian football fans.

He after played for PSDS Deli Serdang, Gelora Putra Delta and Persikab Bandung.

== Personal life ==
Juan and his younger brother, Francisco or Paco, who also played in Indonesian football, are the sons of the former Chile international footballer Juan Rodríguez Vega and the nephews of the also former footballers Manuel and Gabriel Rodríguez Vega.
