= Víctor Hugo Ávalos =

Paraguayan footballer (1971–2009)

- Ávalos with Silvio Pettirossi in 2008

Personal information
- Full name: Víctor Hugo Ávalos Acosta
- Date of birth: 6 November 1971
- Place of birth: Asunción, Paraguay
- Date of death: 2 April 2009 (aged 37)
- Place of death: San Vicente, Paraguay
- Height: 1.80 m (5 ft 11 in)
- Position: Central midfielder

Youth career
- 1986–1989: Cerro Corá

Senior career*
Years	Team	Apps	(Gls)
1990	Cerro Corá	5	(0)
1991–1992	Quilmes	38	(0)
1993	Independiente Medellín	36	(3)
1994–1995	Olimpia	24	(1)
1996	Tembetary	2	(0)
1997–1999	Guaraní	67	(3)
2000–2001	12 de Octubre	22	(1)
2002	Presidente Hayes	43	(1)
2003	Tacuary	30	(1)
2004	Deportes Temuco	18	(2)
2005	Universidad de Concepción	36	(4)
2006	Deportes Puerto Montt	5	(0)
2006	Curicó Unido	18	(0)
2007	Santiago Wanderers	17	(0)
2007	Fernández Vial	13	(1)
2008	Silvio Pettirossi	15	(0)
2009	Villa Florida	1	(1)
Total		390	(18)

International career
1991	Paraguay U20	4	(0)
1996	Paraguay	1	(0)
- * Club domestic league appearances and goals

Víctor Hugo Ávalos Acosta (6 November 1971 – 2 April 2009) was a Paraguayan footballer most remembered for his spells at Quilmes, Independiente Medellín and in Chilean football. Mainly a central midfielder who could also operate as an attacking playmaker, he died in 2009 from a heart attack during an amateur football game.

== Club career ==
Born in the capital Asunción, Ávalos joined hometown's Club Cerro Corá, growing up at the club's football academy and making his Primera División debut in 1990, aged 19.

=== Quilmes ===
His style of play caught the attention of Argentine Primera División side Quilmes Atlético Club, and he went on to play all the games of the 1991–92 season for the Buenos Aires-based outfit, with Nelson Vivas as teammate.

=== Independiente Medellín ===
The next season Ávalos joined Independiente Medellín of Colombia, playing 36 matches and scoring three goals.

=== Olimpia Asunción ===
In 1994, Ávalos joined Primera División Paraguaya and Copa Libertadores team Olimpia Asunción, in a team with Jorge Luis Campos, Jose Cardozo, Casiano Delvalle, Gabriel Gonzalez, Harles Bourdier, Celso Ayala, Virginio Caceres, Jorge Battaglia and Ricardo Tavarelli. During the Copa Libertadores of the same season, Ávalos scored 1 goal in 5 games.

The team won the Primera División title in 1995.

=== Tembetary ===
In 1996, Ávalos joined Atlético Tembetary, featuring for the side with goalkeeper Dario Espinola and Uruguayan Darwin Quintana. Whilst at Tembetary, Ávalos became a national team player.

=== Guaraní ===
In 1997 Ávalos joined Club Guaraní, eventually being club captain. Ávalos made 3 appearances for Guaraní in the 1998 Copa Libertadores.

=== 12 de Octubre ===
In 2000, Ávalas joined 12 de Octubre de Itaguá, where he had as teammates Salvador Cabañas, Dario Veron and Elvis Marecos. For the following season at 12 de Octubre, Ávalos was joined in the team by Fredy Bareiro.

=== Deportes Temuco ===
In January 2004, aged 32, he arrived at Deportes Temuco of the Chilean Primera División, going on to remain the vast majority of his remaining career in the country, representing in quick succession C.D. Universidad de Concepción, Deportes Puerto Montt, C.D.P. Curicó Unido and Santiago Wanderers of Valparaíso (playing seventeen 2007 Apertura games for the latter club) and having also appeared for C.D.F.A. Arturo Fernández Vial in the Primera B.

=== Silvio Pettirossi ===
In 2008, Ávalas played for Club Silvio Pettirossi. Avalos amassed a total of 15 appearances for Silvio Pettirossi during the 2008 season.

=== Villa Florida ===
In 2009, Ávalos joined local team Villa Florida.

== International career ==
Ávalos was capped once by the Paraguayan national side, on 14 February 1996 against Bolivia. He replaced Club Atlético Independiente's Roberto Acuña in the 52nd minute of a 1–4 away friendly loss prior to the 1998 FIFA World Cup qualifiers.

Additionally, Ávalos played four times for the U-20s in 1991, competing in the South American Youth Championship in Venezuela.

== Personal life ==
He is the father of the Chilean footballer Giovanny Ávalos.

== Death ==
On 2 April 2009, during his debut at Paraguayan amateur club Villa Florida, Ávalos scored a goal against Salesianito in San Vicente (Asunción). During the subsequent celebrations, he suffered a heart attack, being afflicted by several cardiac arrests, dying at the age of 37.

Weeks later, Ávalos' former club Deportes Temuco made him a tribute match, which featured players as strikers Lucas Barrios and César Díaz, as well as Sergio Bernabé Vargas, historic goalkeeper of the Chilean football team.

== Career statistics ==
=== Club ===
Appearances and goals by club, season and competition
Club	Season	League		Cup		International		Total	
Club	Season	Apps	Goals	Apps	Goals	Apps	Goals	Apps	Goals
Deportes; Temuco	2004	18	2					18	2
Universidad de Concepción	2005	36	4					36	4
Puerto Montt	2006–A	5	0					5	0
Curicó Unido	2006	18	0					18	0
Santiago Wanderers	2007–A	17	0					17	0
Fernández Vial	2007	13	1					13	1
Silvio Pettirossi	2008	15	0					15	0
Villa Florida	2009	1	1					1	1
Career total		123	8					123	8

=== International ===
Appearances and goals by national team and year
National team	Year	Apps	Goals
Paraguay	1996	1	0
Total		1	0

== Honours ==
Olimpia

- Primera División: 1995

== See also ==
- List of association footballers who died while playing
