= Pacho Rubio =

Chilean footballer (born 1976)

Personal information
- Full name: Francisco Javier Rodríguez Rubio
- Date of birth: 3 April 1976 (age 50)
- Place of birth: Mexico City, Mexico
- Position: Striker

Youth career
- Universidad Católica
- Universidad de Chile

Senior career*
Years	Team	Apps	(Gls)
1995	Universidad de Chile		
1995–1996	PSIM Yogyakarta		
1997	Arema Malang		
1998	PSM Makassar		
1999–2000	Arema Malang		(10)
2001–2003	Celaya		
2004–2005	Huda Hue		
2006	Thép Pomina Tiền Giang		
2006–2005	Starta Dong Nai		
- * Club domestic league appearances and goals

Francisco Javier Rodríguez Rubio (born 3 April 1976), also known as Paco Rodríguez Rubio or Pacho Rubio in Indonesia, is a Chilean former professional footballer who played as a striker for clubs in Chile, Indonesia, Mexico and Vietnam.

== Career ==
As a youth player, he was with both Universidad Católica and Universidad de Chile youth systems, where he coincided with players such as Marcelo Salas and Cristian Leiva in the last,

Despite he joined Arema Malang in the 1997–98 season by suggestion of his older brother and player of the team, Juan, Francisco made appearances in the 1999–2000 season, where he scored 10 goals. In addition to his brother, in the club he also coincided with his compatriot Rodrigo Araya.

Previously, he played for PSIM Yogyakarta and PSM Makassar.

== Personal life ==
Francisco and his older brother, Juan, with whom he coincided in Indonesian football, are the sons of the former Chile international footballer Juan Rodríguez Vega and the nephews of the also former footballers Manuel and Gabriel Rodríguez Vega.

As a player of Arema Malang, he was well known by his temper, being nicknamed Bad Boy.
