= Julio César Moreno =

Chilean football manager (born 1969)

Personal information
- Full name: Julio César Moreno Yáñez
- Date of birth: 27 September 1969 (age 57)
- Place of birth: Santiago, Chile
- Position: Midfielder

Youth career
- Universidad Católica

Senior career*
| Years | Team | Apps | (Gls) |
- Universidad Católica
| 1996 | Arema Malang | | |

Managerial career
- 2000–2003: China (assistant coach)
- 2003–2004: Honduras (assistant coach)
- 2004–2005: Al-Saad (assistant coach)
- 2006: L'Entente SSG
- 2006–2007: Betis (assistant coach)
- 2007: Jamaica (assistant coach)
- 2008–2009: Kitchee
- 2009: Iraq (assistant coach)
- 2009–2010: Serbia (assistant coach)
- 2013: Qatar U23
- 2013–2014: Guangdong Sunray Cave
- 2015–2016: Al Rayyan (assistant coach)
- 2016–2018: Qatar (assistant coach)
- 2018–2019: Thailand (analyst)
- 2019: Thailand (assistant coach)
- 2019–: Al Kharaitiyat (assistant coach)
- * Club domestic league appearances and goals

Julio César Moreno Yáñez (born 27 September 1969) is a Football Manager.

== Career ==
As a young football player, Moreno was with Universidad Católica, until he was invited to play outside Chile by his friends. So, he played football in Indonesia for Arema Malang, where he coincided with his compatriots Nelson León Sánchez and Juan Rodríguez Rubio, Malaysia, Singapore and Australia. Once in Sydney, he studied football analytics at university level, where he met Bora Milutinović.

He is the former assistant coach of Iraq national football team, previously he was the head coach of Hong Kong First Division League side Kitchee.

He is former's assistant of Bora Milutinović. He follows Milutinović to Iraq national football team in May 2009 until June 2009. Moreno has been comparts with Milutinovic in 2009 FIFA Confederations Cup. In the winter of 2010, he was recruited as a coach by Serbia's national team coach Radomir Antić, with whom he has been helping plan out strategies and analysis for the games and matches.

He has developed a close friendship with the Chile international footballer Arturo Vidal.

== Managerial career ==
Assistant Coach Bora Milutinovic National Team China January 2000 – June 2003 First and only time classified to the World Cup 2002

Assistant Coach Bora Milutinovic National Team Honduras September 2003 – June 2004 Qualifiers 2006 World Cup in Germany

Assistant Coach Bora Milutinovic Al Sadd July 2004 – December 2005 Emir of Qatar Cup Champions

Head Coach L'Entente SSG January 2006 – November 2006

Assistant Coach Luis Fernandez Real Betis Balompie December 2006 – July 2007 Objective Completed, maintain category of the club in the first division. Quarter-finals of Copa del Rey

Assistant Coach Bora Milutinovic National Team Jamaica August 2007 – March 2008

Head Coach of Hong Kong First Division League side Kitchee Kitchee F.C. May 2008 – March 2009 Head Coach 2009, National Team Hong Kong, Lunar New Year Cup 2009

Assistant Coach Bora Milutinovic National Team Iraq April 2009 – August 2009 Participated in the FIFA Confederations Cup 2009

Assistant Coach Radomir Antic National Team Serbia December 2009 – September 2010 Participated in the FIFA World Cup 2010

Incorporation to The Group Qatar bid 2022 September 2010

Supported National Team Qatar U-20 January 2011 – December 2012

Head Coach National Team Qatar U-23 (Olympic Team) March 2013

Head Coach Guangdong Sunray Cave (China) April 2013 – May 2014

Assistant Coach Al Rayyan Qatar June 2015 - September 2016

Assistant Coach National Team Qatar October 2016 – December 2018

Analyst National Team Thailand December 2018 – February 2019

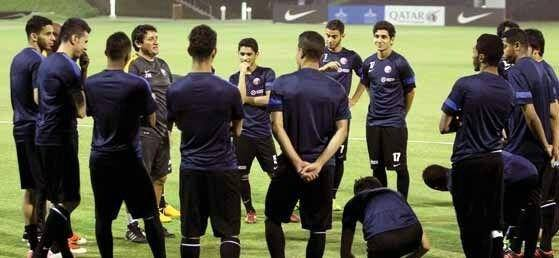
