= Jorge Ormeño =

Chilean footballer (born 1977)

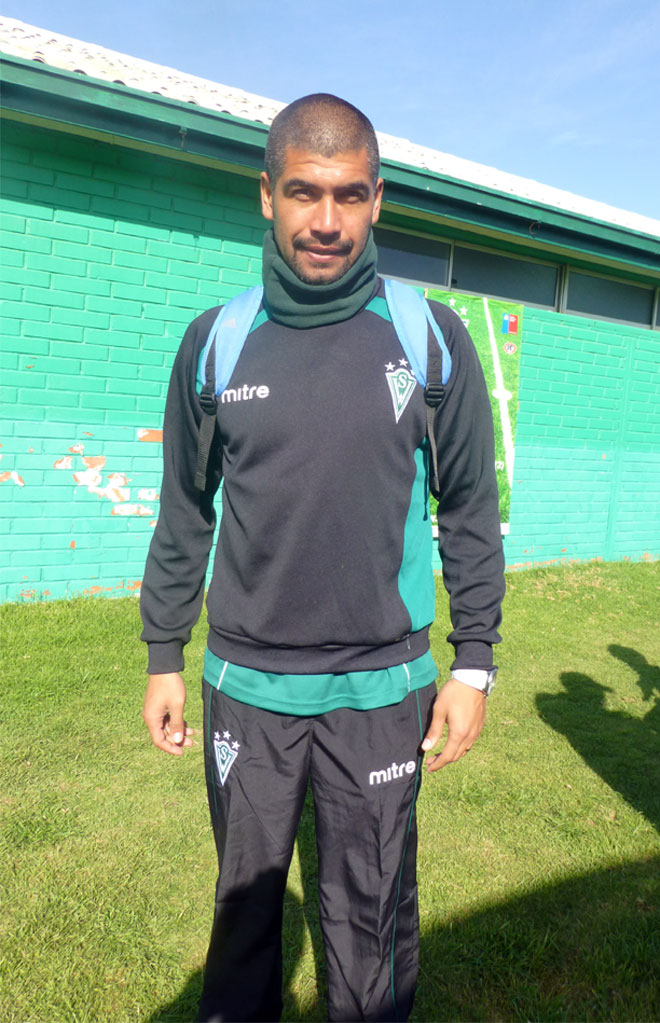

Personal information
- Full name: Jorge Andrés Ormeño Guerra
- Date of birth: 14 June 1977 (age 49)
- Place of birth: Viña del Mar, Chile
- Height: 1.78 m (5 ft 10 in)
- Position: Defensive midfielder

Youth career
- Real Chile
- 1991–1996: Santiago Wanderers

Senior career*
Years	Team	Apps	(Gls)
1997–2004	Santiago Wanderers	137	(9)
2000	Santiago Wanderers B	–	(–)
2004–2012	Universidad Católica	261	(6)
2012–2015	Santiago Wanderers	102	(5)
Total		500	(20)

International career^{‡}
2001–2006	Chile	3	(0)
- * Club domestic league appearances and goals as of 15 June 2012 ‡ National team caps and goals as of 4 June 2008

Jorge Andrés Ormeño Guerra (Spanish pronunciation: [ˈxoɾxe anˈdɾes oɾˈmeɲo ˈɣera]; born 14 June 1977) is a Chilean retired footballer.

== Career ==
He played for Primera División clubs like Santiago Wanderers or Universidad Católica. He also played for the B-team of Santiago Wanderers in the 2000 Tercera División alongside fellows such as Mauricio Neveu, Joel Soto and Mauricio Rojas He retired in December 2015.

Ormeno appeared for the Chile national football team in 2002 FIFA World Cup qualification and made his last appearance in a 2006 friendly.

== Honours ==
=== Club ===
Santiago Wanderers

- Primera B (1): 1999
- Primera División de Chile (1): 2001

Universidad Católica

- Primera División de Chile (2): 2005 Clausura, 2010
- Copa Chile (1): 2011
