= Francisco Pedraza =

Chilean footballer (born 1988)

Personal information
- Full name: Francisco Javier Pedraza Abrilot
- Date of birth: 6 July 1988 (age 38)
- Place of birth: Viña del Mar, Chile
- Height: 1.66 m (5 ft 5 1/2 in)
- Position: Right midfielder

Youth career
- Everton
- Santiago Wanderers

Senior career*
Years	Team	Apps	(Gls)
2007–2013	Santiago Wanderers	23	(0)
2008	→ Unión Quilpué (loan)		
2009	→ Trasandino (loan)		
2010	→ Deportes Temuco (loan)		
2013	→ Deportes Linares (loan)	16	(0)
2014	Chaco Petrolero		
2014	EMI		
2015–2017	Always Ready		
2018	Deportivo FATIC		
2019–2020	Unión Maestranza		
- * Club domestic league appearances and goals

Francisco Javier Pedraza Abrilot (born 6 July 1988) is a Chilean footballer who plays as a right midfielder.

== Career ==
As a youth player, Pedraza was with Everton and next he moved to Santiago Wanderers, making his debut on 22 July 2007 in a 1–0 win against Universidad Católica. For the team, he made appearances in the top division in both the 2007 and the 2011 seasons.

After stints on loan at Unión Quilpué, Trasandino, Deportes Temuco and Deportes Linares, he emigrated to Bolivia.

In 2014 he moved to Bolivia and played for clubs in the Asociación de Fútbol de La Paz. His first team was Chaco Petrolero, playing after for Escuela Militar Ingeniería (EMI), Always Ready, Deportivo FATIC and Unión Maestranza. In Deportivo FATIC, he coincided with his compatriot Roberto Luco.

== Controversies ==
In October 2012, Pedraza was stabbed in the back in the context of a fight at a party when he was a player of Deportes Temuco.

In 2013, Pedraza was accused of rape when he was a player of Deportes Linares. On 28 July 2021 he was arrested in Bolivia and then extradited to Chile to go on the court case.
