= Luis Benítez =

Argentine footballer

Personal information
- Full name: Luis Alberto Benítez
- Date of birth: February 14, 1985 (age 41)
- Place of birth: Ezpeleta, Argentina
- Height: 1.89 m (6 ft 2 in)
- Positions: Forward; midfielder

Youth career
- Racing Club

Senior career*
Years	Team	Apps	(Gls)
2003–2011	Racing Club	16	(2)
2007	→ Santiago Wanderers (loan)	13	(0)
2007–2009	→ Olmedo (loan)	32	(4)
2011–2012	Quilmes	1	(0)
Total		62	(6)
- * Club domestic league appearances and goals

Luis Alberto Benítez (born February 14, 1985, in Ezpeleta) is an Argentine former football forward or midfielder.

== Teams ==
- (Argentina) Racing Club 2003–2006
- (Chile) Santiago Wanderers 2007
- (Argentina) Racing Club 2007–2008
- (Ecuador) Olmedo 2009
- (Argentina) Racing Club 2009–2011
- (Argentina) Quilmes 2011–2012
