= Manuel Rodríguez Vega =

Chilean footballer and manager (born 1944)

Personal information
- Date of birth: 2 August 1942 (age 84)
- Place of birth: Santiago, Chile
- Position: Midfielder

Youth career
- 1959: Universidad de Chile

Senior career*
| Years | Team | Apps | (Gls) |
| 1960–1973 | Universidad de Chile | | |
| 1964 | → San Luis (loan) | | |
| 1974 | Los Angeles Aztecs | | |
| 1976–1977 | Universidad de Chile | | |

Managerial career
- 1977–1980: Universidad de Chile (youth)
- 1980: Ñublense
- 1981: Universidad de Chile
- 1982: Deportes Iquique
- 1984: Magallanes
- 1988: CTC
- 1989: Fernández Vial
- 1990–1991: Universidad de Chile
- 1992: Deportes Melipilla
- 2004: Persita Tangerang
- 2006: Chile (women)
- 2011: Provincial Osorno
- 2015: Ferroviarios
- 2016: Brujas de Salamanca
- * Club domestic league appearances and goals

Manuel Rodríguez Vega (born 2 August 1942) is a Chilean former football player and manager.

== Coaching career ==
In addition to coach various clubs in the Chilean football, at the beginning Rodríguez Vega worked in the Universidad de Chile youth ranks, where he trained players such as Marcelo Salas, Rodrigo Goldberg and Esteban Valencia.

In the 1990s and 2000s, he lived and worked as coach in Indonesia, country where he came thanks to his brother Juan and coached clubs such as Persita Tangerang. After returning to Chile, he coached clubs at minor categories such as Provincial Osorno, Ferroviarios and Municipal Salamanca. Previously, he coached for a short term the Chile women's national team.

== Personal life ==
His brothers Juan and Gabriel were professional footballers. Juan was part of the Chilean 1974 World Cup squad and Gabriel played for Colo-Colo and Deportes Concepción.

His nephews, Juan and Francisco Rodríguez Rubio, sons of his brother Juan, were also professional footballers who made his career mainly in Indonesia.

== Honours ==
Universidad de Chile

- Campeonato Nacional: 1962, 1965, 1967, 1969
- Torneo Metropolitano: 1968, 1969
- Copa Francisco Candelori: 1969
