= David Reyes (footballer, born 1985) =

Chilean footballer (born 1985)

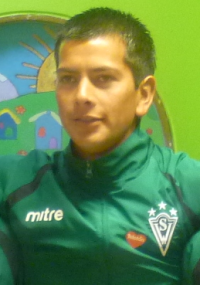

Personal information
- Full name: David Andrés Reyes Ferrada
- Date of birth: 17 January 1985 (age 41)
- Place of birth: San Antonio, Chile
- Height: 1.81 m (5 ft 11 in)
- Position: Goalkeeper

Youth career
- Vista Hermosa
- Unión Santo Domingo
- Colo-Colo
- Santiago Wanderers

Senior career*
Years	Team	Apps	(Gls)
2004–2015	Santiago Wanderers	153	(2)
2004	→ Municipal Limache (loan)	–	(–)
2014	→ Coquimbo Unido (loan)	21	(0)
2014–2015	→ Deportes Temuco (loan)	8	(0)
2015–2017	San Luis	13	(0)
2017–2021	San Antonio Unido	113	(0)
Total		308	(0)
- * Club domestic league appearances and goals

David Andrés Reyes Ferrada (born 17 January 1985) is a Chilean former footballer who played as a goalkeeper.

== Career ==
As a youth player, Reyes was with clubs in his city of birth and Colo-Colo before joining Santiago Wanderers.

His last club was Chilean Segunda División side San Antonio Unido and retired at the end of the 2021 season.

== Honours ==
San Luis de Quillota

- Primera B (1): 2014 Clausura
