= Ezpeleta, Argentina =

Ezpeleta
- Town
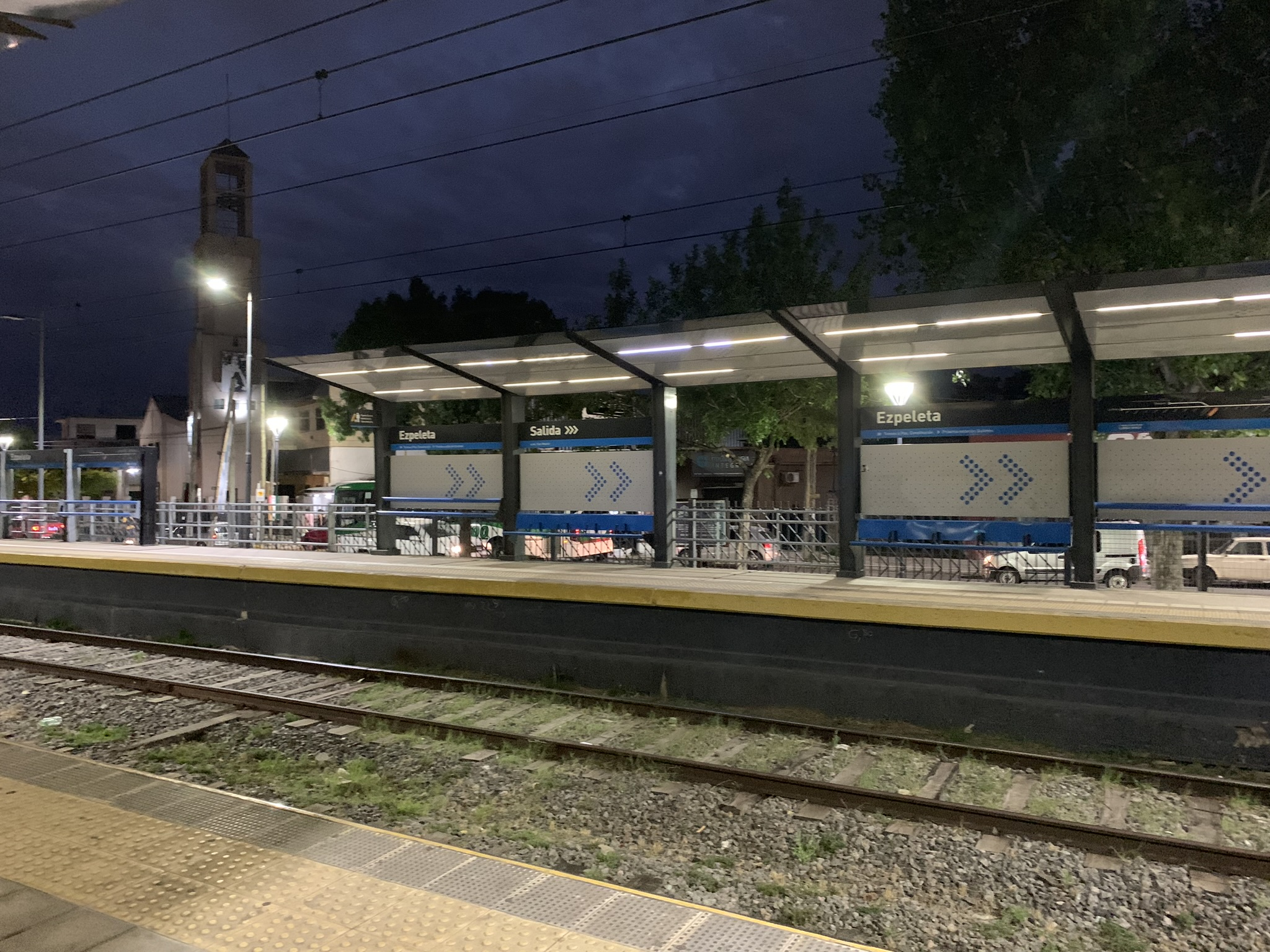
- Ezpeleta railway station

- Location within Buenos Aires Province
- Coordinates: 34°45′06″S 58°14′04″W
- Country: Argentina
- Province: Buenos Aires
- Partido: Quilmes
- Established: Dec 19, 1904
- Elevation: 41 m (135 ft)

Population (2022 Census)
  - Total: 92.095
- Time zone: UTC−3 (ART)
- CPA Base: B 1882
- Climate: Cfa

Ezpeleta is a locality in Quilmes Partido, Buenos Aires Province, Argentina. It is served by Ezpeleta station on the Roca Line, which connects Plaza Constitución with La Plata.

Ezpeleta stands surrounding the General Roca Railway. The train station is 8 stops away from Constitución and 10 stops away from La Plata.

The demonym for residents is Ezpeletenses. It is a mostly residential neighborhood, with a small commercial center near the station.

== Population ==
According to INDEC, which collects population data for the country, the town had a population of 92.095 people as of the 2022 census.

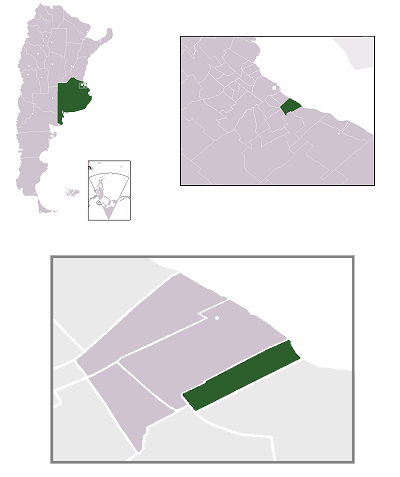
Location in Quilmes

Station nameboard

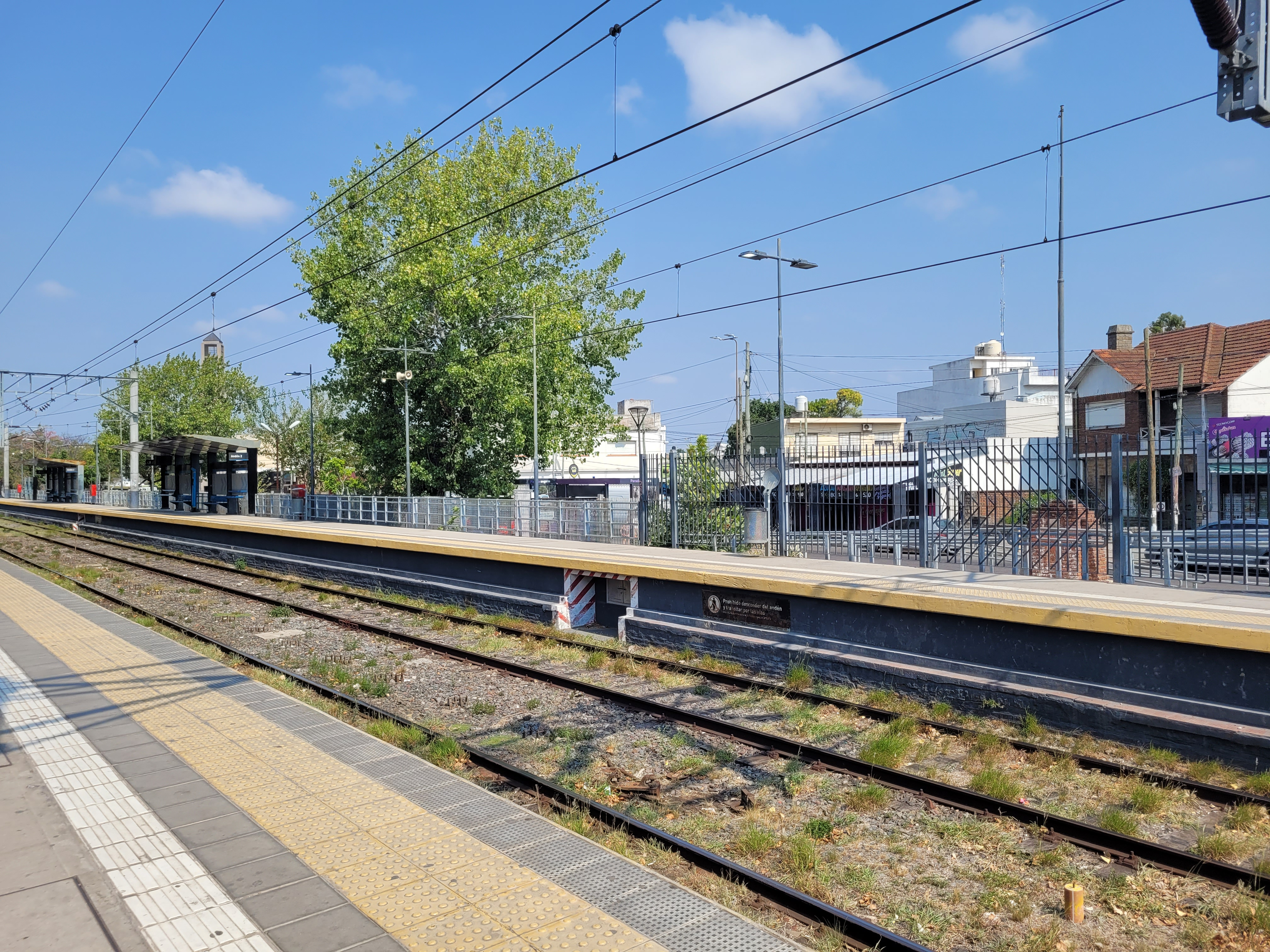
Railway station

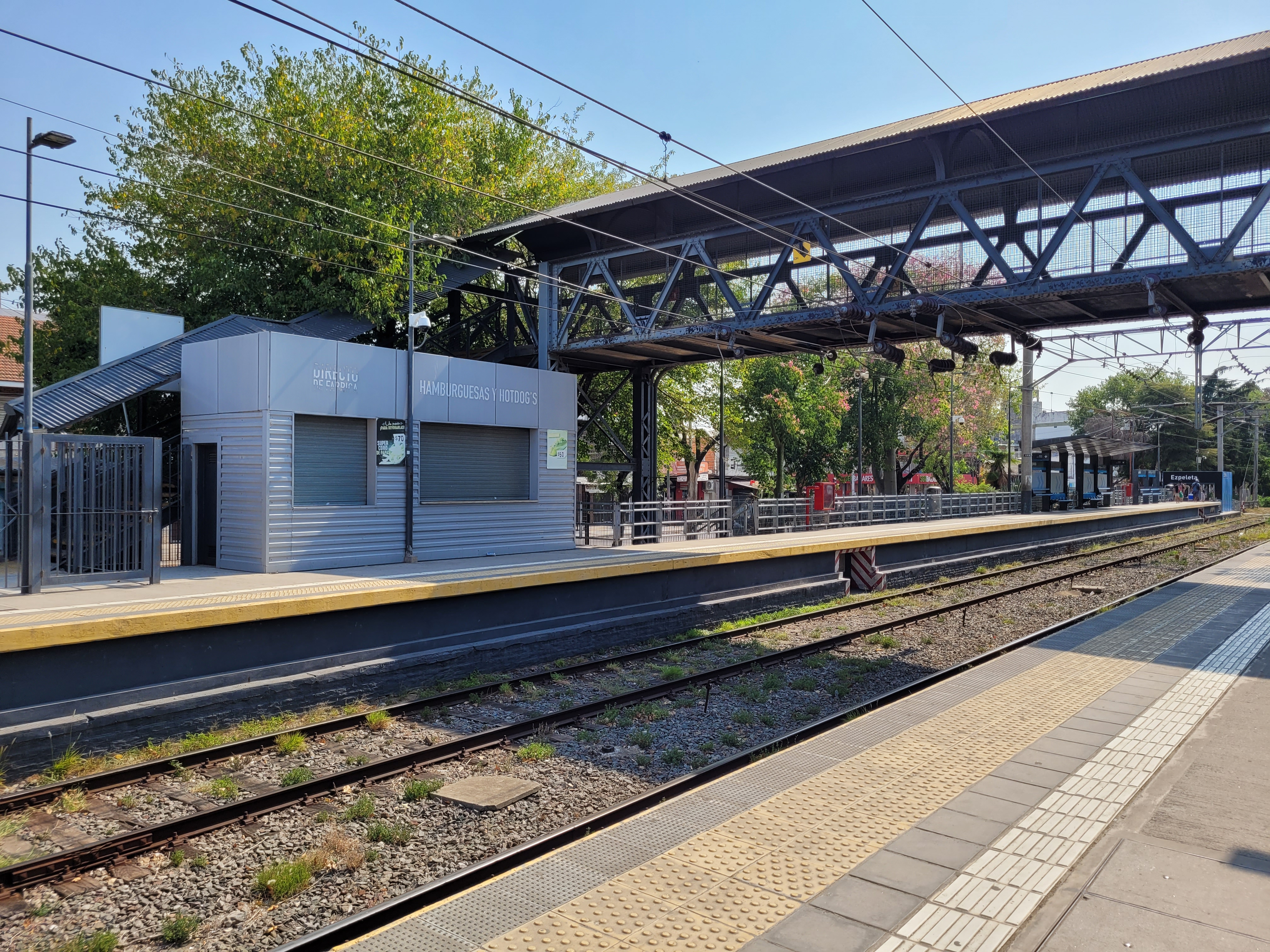
Station footbridge
