= Víctor Oyarzún =

Chilean footballer (born 1980)

Personal information
- Full name: Víctor Manuel Oyarzún Venegas
- Date of birth: 18 June 1980 (age 46)
- Place of birth: Castro, Chile
- Height: 1.73 m (5 ft 8 in)
- Position: Defender

Senior career*
Years	Team	Apps	(Gls)
2000–2004	Puerto Montt		
2002	→ Temuco (loan)		
2005–2006	Antofagasta		
2007–2009	Cobresal		
2010–2014	Antofagasta		
- * Club domestic league appearances and goals as of 22 March 2020

Victor Manuel Oyarzún Venegas (born 18 June 1980) was a Chilean footballer.

He played for Deportes Antofagasta.

== Honours ==
=== Player ===
Deportes Antofagasta

- Primera B (1): 2011 Apertura
