= San Vicente (Asunción) =

Coordinates: 25°34′S 55°07′W

- Barrio
- Interactive map of San Vicente
- Country: Paraguay
- Autonomous Capital District: Gran Asunción
- City: Asunción

San Vicente is a neighborhood (barrio) of Asunción, Paraguay.It has an area of 2.759 km².

In the 2022 census, the population in San Vicente was 15,449 and its population density 5,599/km².
