= Adrián Rojas =

Chilean footballer (born 1977)

Personal information
- Full name: Adrián Alejandro Rojas Contreras
- Date of birth: May 23, 1977 (age 49)
- Place of birth: Santiago, Chile
- Height: 1.81 m (5 ft 11 1/2 in)
- Position: Defender

Youth career
- Palestino

Senior career*
Years	Team	Apps	(Gls)
1996–2003	Palestino	134	(2)
2002	→ Racing Club (loan)	9	(6)
2003	→ Cartaginés (loan)	49	(0)
2004–2006	Universidad de Chile	72	(11)
2007	O'Higgins	34	(10)
2008–2012	Everton	84	(7)
2012–2013	Rangers	18	(1)
2014	Deportes La Serena	31	(11)
Total		422	(31)

Managerial career
- 2018: Palestino U17
- 2018–2022: Cobresal (youth)
- 2022–: Universidad de Chile (youth)
- * Club domestic league appearances and goals

Adrián Alejandro Rojas Contreras (born May 23, 1977) is a former Chilean professional football player.

== Playing career ==
He started his career in Palestino, remaining with that club for 5 seasons until 2001. In 2002, he joined Racing Club of the Primera División Argentina, but he had a bad stretch for that club and had to return to Palestino. After that he joined Cartaginés of Costa Rica in 2002.

After one successful season in Costa Rica, Rojas moved back his country, now on one of the great teams of Chile, Universidad de Chile. In his first season Rojas had a successful performance, leading the club in penalties in 2004. After 2 seasons he signed for O'Higgins, managed by Jorge Garcés.

In 2008 Rojas was signed by Everton. In his first season the club won the championship of the country's first division against Colo-Colo in a global of 3-2. In his third match he scored his first goal with the team against Rangers.

== Coaching career ==
Following his retirement as a football player, he worked in the business area until he began his studies as a football coach. He has worked in the youth systems of Palestino, Cobresal and Universidad de Chile.

== Honours ==
=== Club ===
Universidad de Chile

- Primera División de Chile (1): 2004 Apertura

Everton

- Primera División de Chile (1): 2008 Apertura
