= Víctor Cancino =

Chilean footballer (born 1972)

Personal information
- Full name: Víctor Antonio Cancino Araneda
- Date of birth: 27 June 1972 (age 54)
- Place of birth: Los Lagos, Chile
- Height: 1.76 m (5 ft 9 in)
- Position: Defensive midfielder

Senior career*
Years	Team	Apps	(Gls)
1992	Deportivo Valdivia	–	(–)
1992–1997	Real Valdivia	204	(1)
1997–1998	Deportes Puerto Montt	68	(0)
1999–2001	Deportes Concepción	43	(2)
2002–2004	Santiago Wanderers	136	(4)
2004–2005	Universidad de Chile	26	(0)
2005	→ Santiago Wanderers (loan)	19	(2)
2006–2007	Coquimbo Unido	43	(0)
2007	Santiago Wanderers	17	(0)
2008–2011	Deportes Puerto Montt	148	(1)

International career
2001	Chile	2	(0)
2001	Chile B	1	(0)

Managerial career
- 2012–2013: Deportes Puerto Montt (youth)
- 2012: Deportes Puerto Montt (assistant)
- 2017: Deportes Rengo
- 2021: Deportes Puerto Montt (assistant)
- * Club domestic league appearances and goals

Víctor Antonio Cancino Araneda (Spanish pronunciation: [ˈbiɣtoɾ anˈtonjo kanˈsino aɾaˈneða]; born 27 June 1972) is a Chilean former footballer who played as a defensive midfielder.

During a career spanning nearly two decades, he represented clubs including Deportes Puerto Montt, Deportes Concepción, Santiago Wanderers, Universidad de Chile and Coquimbo Unido, and was capped twice by the Chile national team.

== Club career ==
Cancino began his senior career in southern Chile before joining Deportes Puerto Montt, where he played during the 1990s. In 1999 he moved to Deportes Concepción, becoming a regular member of the club's midfield.

With Deportes Concepción, Cancino participated in the 2001 Copa Libertadores. He started five of the club's first five matches in the competition, including the 3–2 home victory over Argentine side San Lorenzo de Almagro. Following that match, Cancino suffered a facial fracture after being struck by San Lorenzo player Lucas Pusineri during an altercation after the final whistle. He underwent surgery and spent five days in hospital before being discharged.

At the end of 2001, Cancino left Deportes Concepción and joined Santiago Wanderers. He spent the 2002 and 2003 seasons with the Valparaíso club, regularly featuring in midfield.

Cancino signed for Universidad de Chile ahead of the 2004 season and became part of the side coached by Héctor Pinto. He was a regular during the club's successful 2004 Apertura campaign and started the second leg of the final against Cobreloa, which Universidad de Chile won on penalties after a 1–1 draw in Calama.

During 2005, Cancino had another spell with Santiago Wanderers before returning to Universidad de Chile. He featured in the Universidad de Chile side that reached the final of the 2005 Clausura against Universidad Católica. In the first leg, Cancino conceded the penalty from which Universidad Católica scored the only goal and subsequently took responsibility for the incident; he was suspended for the return match through accumulation of yellow cards.

In early 2006, Cancino moved to Coquimbo Unido following a contractual dispute concerning his departure from Universidad de Chile. He remained with Coquimbo through the first part of 2007 before returning to Santiago Wanderers later that year.

Cancino rejoined Deportes Puerto Montt in 2008, returning to one of his former clubs after approximately a decade away. He became a regular in the Primera B side, making 21 appearances during the latter part of the 2008 season. He remained with Puerto Montt until 2011, when he ended his professional playing career.

== International career ==
Cancino was called up to the Chile national football team in May 2001 while playing for Deportes Concepción, replacing the injured Milovan Mirošević ahead of a World Cup qualifier against Paraguay.

He earned two senior international caps later that year, appearing in World Cup qualifiers against Brazil and Colombia. Cancino was also included in the Chile squad that travelled to Barcelona for a friendly against the Catalonia national football team on 28 December 2001.

== Honours ==
=== Club ===
Universidad de Chile

- Primera División de Chile (1): 2004 Apertura
