= Richard Benítez =

Paraguayan footballer (born 1981)

Personal information
- Full name: Richard Antonio Benítez Subeldia
- Date of birth: 30 October 1981 (age 45)
- Place of birth: Itauguá, Paraguay
- Height: 1.78 m (5 ft 10 in)
- Position: Defender

Youth career
- Guaraní

Senior career*
Years	Team	Apps	(Gls)
2003–2004	Guaraní		
2003	→ 12 de Octubre (loan)		
2005	Unión Española	32	(2)
2006	Deportes Antofagasta	9	(1)
2007–2008	Santiago Wanderers	27	(1)
2008	Sportivo Luqueño	16	(0)
- * Club domestic league appearances and goals

Richard Antonio Benítez Subeldia (born 30 October 1981) is a Paraguayan former professional footballer who played as a defender.

== Teams ==
- (Paraguay) 12 de Octubre 2003
- (Paraguay) Guaraní 2003–2004
- (Chile) Unión Española 2005
- (Chile) Deportes Antofagasta 2006
- (Chile) Santiago Wanderers 2007–2008
- (Paraguay) Sportivo Luqueño 2008

== Honours ==
Unión Española

- Primera División de Chile: 2005 Apertura
