= Joel Soto =

Chilean footballer (born 1982)

Personal information
- Full name: Joel Antonio Soto Torres
- Date of birth: 9 April 1982
- Place of birth: Valparaíso, Chile
- Height: 1.73 m (5 ft 8 in)
- Position: Forward

Youth career
- Santiago Wanderers

Senior career*
Years	Team	Apps	(Gls)
1998–2003	Santiago Wanderers	84	(39)
1999–2000	Santiago Wanderers B	–	(–)
2003	Chiapas	13	(0)
2004	Colo-Colo	6	(1)
2004	Potros Neza	–	(–)
2005	Puebla	8	(1)
2005	Santiago Wanderers	15	(3)
2006	O'Higgins	18	(9)
2007	Universidad de Chile	32	(2)
2008–2009	Santiago Wanderers	42	(20)
2009	Ñublense	13	(1)
2010	San Luis	32	(7)
2011	Cobresal	28	(3)
2012	San Luis	14	(0)
2013	Unión La Calera	4	(0)
Total		309	(86)

International career
2001	Chile U20	2	(0)
2002–2003	Chile	5	(0)
2004	Chile U23	7	(2)
- * Club domestic league appearances and goals

Joel Antonio Soto Torres (born in Valparaiso, Chile on 9 April 1982) is a Chilean former professional footballer who played as a forward.

== Club career ==
=== Santiago Wanderers ===
His childhood was spent in the Cerro Toro of Valparaíso then was enrolled in Santiago Wanderers at an early age. His debut as a professional was on the 1998 season.

During the 1998 season, Santiago Wanderers had a team with many talented players but at that same season his team dropped to the second division of Chilean football. During the 1999 season, like the previous season, he did not have the chance to play since the time the team had a particularly good goal scoring figure in Reinaldo Navia. The following year and back in the first division he began to consider several offers for different teams and began to assert himself. He also played for the B-team in the 2000 Tercera División alongside fellows such as Mauricio Neveu, Jorge Ormeño and Mauricio Rojas.

In 2001, the Santiago Wanderers made several changes and Joel became stronger in front of the post holder and with much more experience, he started to become a figure alongside other players like Jaime Riveros, Moisés Villarroel and Silvio Fernandez. During this season he was called to be in part of the roster for the national team sub-20 to compete in the under-20 World Cup but the bitter fact was that he and along with other teammates, was involved in an act of indiscretion, which led to his demotion to be trained with a lesser team. Once he came back with the Santiago Wanderers, he became one of the leader scores which resulted in a world championship place for his team, the first one for Santiago Wanderers in 33 years.

During the 2002 season for the first time in his career he disputed an international cup, the Copa Libertadores, where his team was eliminated in the first round but achieving good results versus the current champion, Boca Juniors, a tie in Argentina and a victory in Chile were crucial for Soto.

In the same 2002 season, Soto continued playing for Santiago Wanderers for the national championship and scoring more goals, rumors emerged from people linked to big national football clubs like Club América and Boca Juniors, and even a team from France. In that same year, he also achieved playing for the first time in the Copa Sudamericana where he reached the quarterfinals. Everything was achieved during this season which earned him a spot on the roster for the adult national team playing in some practice games.

Finally, despite all the rumors about his departure from Santiago Wanderers nothing was finalized in particular because of the problems with the leadership and continuous playing for the love of the club, he even went into a tournament for the first time, he was elected by his peers as team captain.

=== Mexico ===
After so many rumors about his transfer finally in mid-2003 is transferred to Mexican club Chiapas earlier in the tournament had been descended. Yet the Jaguars could not achieve a good performance, it was no longer the same as playing at Santiago Wanderers, on this table Buenos Aires wanted to have it back for the 2004 season but the economic gap could not make it succeed, and that Soto had no intentions of returning to Chilean football because it cost a lot for going abroad.

Despite its low yield, their calls to the selection were not integrated and the preparation of the Selection Sub pre-23 to compete in pre-Olympic to be held in Chile.

=== Return to Chile ===
During the tournament pre Sudamerican Sub-23 in Chile, Soto wished for his return to Chile but this time not played by Santiago Wanderers, he took part in the Chile's most popular soccer club, Colo-Colo. Soto came to the club for six months on loan as a reinforcement for the Copa Libertadores in 2004 where they failed to pass through to the first round. Colo-Colo was unable to pay him well and in nine matches where only two single achievements were made before his former club, Santiago Wanderers. To this day, he is playing for Unión La Calera.

After his retirement from professional soccer, he served as a sports advisor for the city of Valparaíso.

== International career ==
He represented Chile at under-20 level in the 2001 FIFA World Youth Championship and was the team captain of Chile U23 in the 2004 CONMEBOL Pre-Olympic Tournament.

At senior level, he made 5 appearances for Chile in friendly matches.

== Personal life ==
He is nicknamed Huevo (Egg).

He is the uncle of the former professional footballer José Soto, who also played for Santiago Wanderers.

In January 2022, he was arrested for drug trafficking in Valparaíso.

== Honours ==
Santiago Wanderers

- Primera División de Chile: 2001

Individual

- Primera B top scorer: 2008
