= Diego Díaz (footballer, born 1996) =

Chilean footballer

Personal information
- Full name: Diego Cristián Nelson Díaz Núñez
- Date of birth: 19 March 1996 (age 30)
- Place of birth: Santiago, Chile
- Height: 1.75 m (5 ft 9 in)
- Position: Defender

Youth career
- 2011–2017: Curicó Unido
- 2017: Universidad Católica

Senior career*
Years	Team	Apps	(Gls)
2014–2017	Curicó Unido	15	(0)
2017	Palestino	1	(0)
2018	San Luis	0	(0)
2019	Deportes Recoleta	22	(3)
2020	Deportes Concepción	10	(0)
2021	Independiente de Cauquenes	16	(1)
- * Club domestic league appearances and goals as of 25 July 2022

Diego Cristián Nelson Díaz Núñez (born 2 May 1996) is a Chilean footballer who last played for Chilean Segunda División side Independiente de Cauquenes as a defender.

== Personal life ==
He is the twin brother of the professional footballer Luis Felipe Díaz. They have played for the same football club four times: Curicó Unido (2013–17), Palestino (2017), Deportes Recoleta (2019) and Independiente de Cauquenes (2021).
