= Daniel Fernández (footballer, born 1978) =

Argentine footballer

Personal information
- Full name: Daniel Alberto Fernández
- Date of birth: 23 February 1978 (age 48)
- Place of birth: San Martín, Argentina
- Height: 1.72 m (5 ft 8 in)
- Position: Attacking midfielder

Youth career
- Chacarita Juniors

Senior career*
Years	Team	Apps	(Gls)
1994–2002	Chacarita Juniors	106	(4)
2003	Dinamo Tirana	7	(1)
2003	Deportes Puerto Montt	21	(0)
1994–2002	Chacarita Juniors	1	(0)
2004–2005	La Plata FC	26	(11)
2005	Sportivo Italiano	14	(1)
2006	Temperley	14	(1)
2006	Cobreloa	13	(0)
2007	Coquimbo Unido	11	(1)
2007	Santiago Wanderers	8	(0)
2008	Rivadavia	10	(2)
2008–2009	Los Andes	11	(0)
2011	Acassuso	0	(0)
2012–2013	Comunicaciones Mercedes	28	(6)
- * Club domestic league appearances and goals

Daniel Alberto Fernández (born 23 February 1978) is an Argentine former footballer who played as an attacking midfielder for clubs in Argentina, Albania and Chile.

== Teams ==
- (Argentina) Chacarita Juniors 1994–2002
- (Albania) Dinamo Tirana 2003
- (Chile) Deportes Puerto Montt 2003
- (Argentina) Chacarita Juniors 2004
- (Argentina) La Plata FC 2004–2005
- (Argentina) Sportivo Italiano 2005
- (Argentina) Temperley 2006
- (Chile) Cobreloa 2006
- (Chile) Coquimbo Unido 2007
- (Chile) Santiago Wanderers 2007
- (Argentina) Rivadavia 2008
- (Argentina) Los Andes 2008–2009
- (Argentina) Acassuso 2011
- (Argentina) Comunicaciones de Mercedes 2012–2013
