= José Luis Jiménez =

Chilean footballer (born 1983)

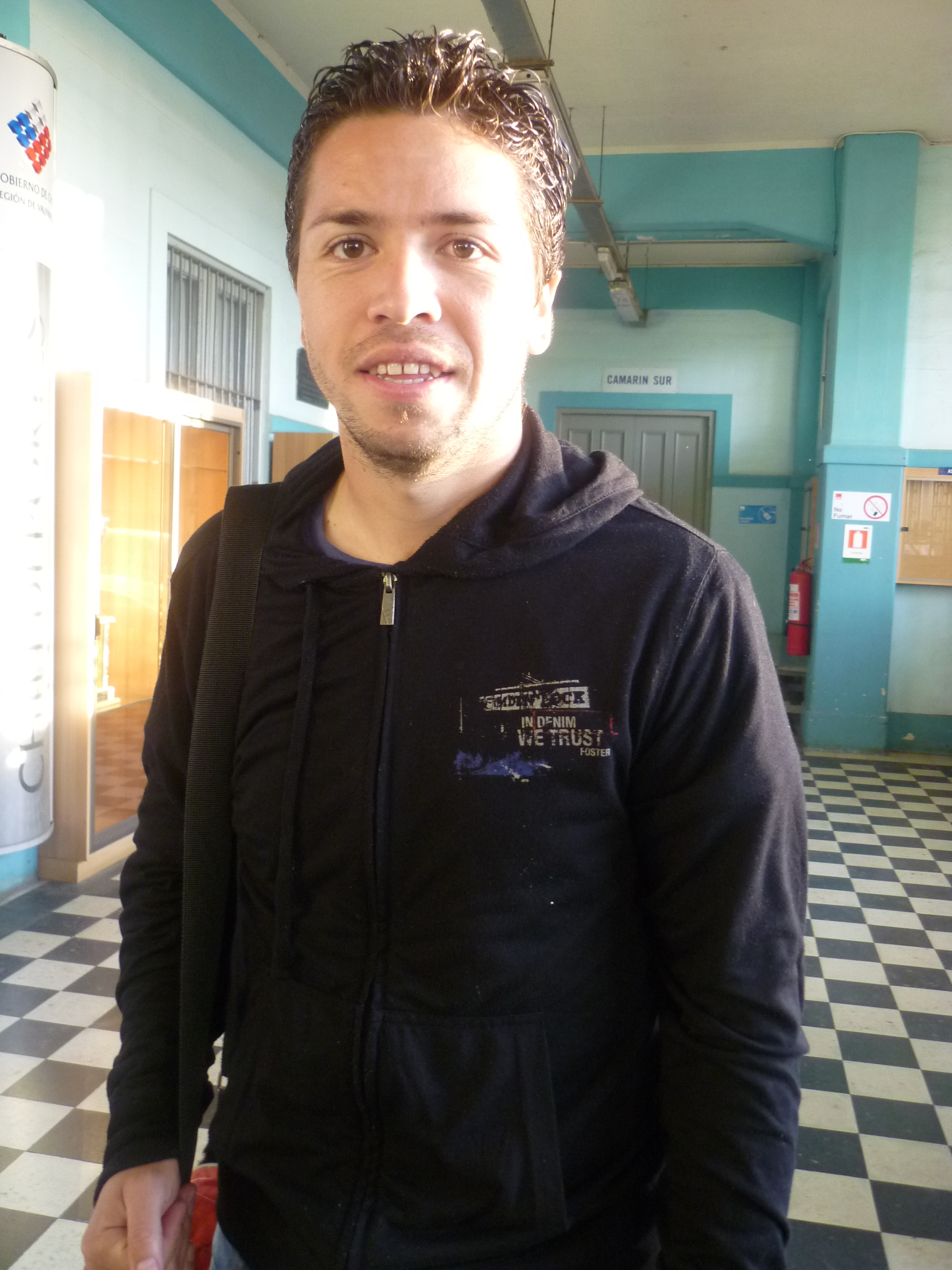
- Jiménez in 2010

Personal information
- Full name: José Luis Jiménez Marín
- Date of birth: 8 August 1983 (age 43)
- Place of birth: Curanilahue, Chile
- Height: 1.72 m (5 ft 7 1/2 in)
- Position: Forward

Team information
- Current team: Unión Española (assistant)

Youth career
- 1999–2003: Universidad de Chile

Senior career*
Years	Team	Apps	(Gls)
2003	Naval	–	(–)
2004	Trasandino	–	(26)
2005–2007	Santiago Wanderers	63	(13)
2008–2014	Universidad de Concepción	102	(11)
2009–2010	→ Santiago Wanderers (loan)	36	(3)
2014	→ Cobreloa (loan)	25	(2)
2015–2017	Cobreloa	77	(11)
2018	Ñublense	19	(2)
2020–2021	Santiago Morning	13	(0)

Managerial career
- 2025–: Unión Española (assistant)
- * Club domestic league appearances and goals

José Luis Jiménez Marín (born 8 August 1983) is a Chilean former professional footballer who played as a forward.

== Club career ==
Jiménez played at Universidad de Chile youth ranks until 2003, but he left the team because he was not in the coach's plans. In 2003, he arrived to Deportes Talcahuano of the Chilean Primera B. In the next season, he arrived to Trasandino de Los Andes of the Tercera División Chilena. At the team of Los Andes, Jiménez was the top-scorer of the Tercera División with 26 goals.

During the summer of 2005, Jiménez was transferred to Santiago Wanderers of the Primera División Chilena, because of his good performance in Tercera División. In the first season, Jiménez played very few matches and at times was not in the plans of coach Carlos González, but because the departure of González, the new coach Mario Soto had his sights set on Jiménez. In 2007, Wanderers was relegated to Primera B and Jiménez canceled his contract with the club, having to pay 15 million pesos. He then signed with C.D. Universidad de Concepción for a one-year deal in January 2008.

In the first season of Jiménez in the club, he scored 2 goals in 8 games. In January 2009, Jiménez won his first professional title, the Copa Chile 2008–09.

In 2009, he was loaned to his former club Santiago Wanderers for a six-month deal. With Wanderers the player achieved the promotion to Primera División Chilena. Lengthening his loan for one year. However, in December 2011, Jiménez return to Universidad de Concepción.

In 2013, Jiménez was sent off, later being dismissed and having his contract torn up, for violently grabbing a dog that wandered onto the pitch by the neck and throwing it into a metal fence.

In April 2021, he announced his retirement from football activity after having played for eighteen years at professional level.

== Coaching career ==
In November 2025, Jiménez assumed as the assistant coach of Gonzalo Villagra in Unión Española.

== Personal life ==
Jiménez is nicknamed Guachupé like a ventriloquist's dummy that made appearances on Chilean TV during the 1980s.

== Club statistics ==
Club Performance
Club	Season	League		Copa Chile		Total
Club	Season	App	Goals	App	Goals	App	Goals
Santiago Wanderers	Apertura 2005	8	0	-	-	8	0
Santiago Wanderers	Clausura 2005	1	0	-	-	1	0
Santiago Wanderers	Apertura 2006	1	0	-	-	1	0
Santiago Wanderers	Clausura 2006	19	5	-	-	19	5
Santiago Wanderers	Apertura 2007	19	5	-	-	19	5
Santiago Wanderers	Clausura 2007	15	3	-	-	13	3
Santiago Wanderers	Clausura 2009	11	2	-	-	11	2
Santiago Wanderers	Torneo 2010	25	1	-	-	25	1
Club Total		99	16	-	-	99	16
Universidad de Concepción	Apertura 2008	8	2	-	-	8	2
Universidad de Concepción	Clausura 2008	15	0	-	-	15	0
Universidad de Concepción	Apertura 2009	15	2	-	-	15	2
Universidad de Concepción	Apertura 2011	17	3	-	-	17	3
Universidad de Concepción	Clausura 2011	17	0	-	-	17	0
Universidad de Concepción	Apertura 2012	13	2	-	-	13	2
Universidad de Concepción	Clausura 2012	17	2	-	-	17	2
Club Total		102	11	-	-	102	11

== Honours ==
=== Player ===
Universidad de Concepción

- Primera B (1): 2013–T
- Copa Chile (1): 2008–09

Individual

- Tercera División Top Scorer: 2004
