= Paulo Pérez =

Argentine footballer (born 1976)

Paulo César Pérez
Personal information
- Full name: Paulo César Pérez
- Date of birth: 18 November 1976 (age 49)
- Place of birth: Rafaela, Argentina
- Height: 1.79 m (5 ft 10 in)
- Position: Defender

Senior career*
Years	Team	Apps	(Gls)
- Ferro Carril Oeste
- Atlético de Rafaela
2000	Badajoz	6	(0)
- Boca Juniors
- Peñarol Rafaela
- Central Córdoba
2002–2003	Widzew Łódź	3	(0)
2003–2004	Ionikos	6	(0)
2005	Sinnai Calcio		
2005	Universitario de Deportes		
2006	Tennis Borussia Berlin	14	(0)
- * Club domestic league appearances and goals

Paulo César Pérez (born 18 November 1976) is an Argentine former professional footballer who played as a defender.
