= Juan Silva (footballer, born March 1989) =

Chilean footballer

Personal information
- Full name: Juan Andrés Silva Cárdenas
- Date of birth: 11 March 1989 (age 37)
- Place of birth: Viña del Mar, Chile
- Height: 1.69 m (5 ft 6 1/2 in)
- Position: Midfielder

Youth career
- Everton
- Santiago Wanderers

Senior career*
Years	Team	Apps	(Gls)
2006–2008	Santiago Wanderers	60	(3)
2009	Deportes La Serena	17	(0)
2010	Cobresal	18	(2)
2011	Ñublense	14	(0)
2011	Cobreloa	4	(0)
2012–2014	Rangers	47	(3)
2013	→ Deportes La Serena (loan)	12	(2)
2014	Palestino	9	(0)
2015	Santiago Morning	4	(0)
2015–2016	Curicó Unido	10	(1)
2016–2017	Unión La Calera	14	(0)
2017	Deportes Vallenar	17	(5)
Total		226	(16)
- * Club domestic league appearances and goals

Juan Andrés Silva Cárdenas (born 11 March 1989) is a Chilean former footballer who played as a midfielder.

== Club career ==
In 2006, he made his debut with Wanderers in a match against Colo Colo. In the Torneo Clausura 2006 he played 16 games. He did not score but gained experience. In early 2007, he played in the Torneo Clausura again, scoring against rivals Everton and La Serena.

Because of his poor discipline, in November 2008 he was loaned. In early 2009 he was training with staff of San Luis Quillota. but the transfer failed. After twenty days he made a test at the Santa Cruz Futebol Clube, club that figured in the Serie C of Brazil. In the second half of 2009 he started training in Deportes La Serena facilities. Later on, Silva went back and forth through clubs including Cobresal, Ñublense, Cobresal and Rangers without achieving continuity and lasting in each club nearly a year.

As of 2013 he played at Club de Deportes La Serena as midfielder, but several new incidents involving alcohol and fights and arguments with fans, including some explicit offensive gestures during a game on 14 December 2013 vs Deportes Temuco.

== Honours ==
=== Player ===
Cobreloa

- Primera División de Chile (1): Runner-up 2011 Clausura
