= José Soto (Chilean footballer) =

Chilean footballer (born 1986)

José Antonio Soto Délano (born 28 January 1986) is a Chilean former professional footballer who played as a forward for Santiago Wanderers, Deportes Concepción, Unión La Calera and Unión Quilpué in Chile.

== Teams ==
- Santiago Wanderers 2001–2003
- Unión La Calera 2004
- Santiago Wanderers 2004–2007
- Unión Quilpué 2007
- Deportes Concepción 2008
- Santiago Wanderers 2008
- Unión Quilpué 2009

== Personal life ==
He is the nephew of the former Chile international footballer Joel Soto, who also played for Santiago Wanderers.

== Honours ==
Santiago Wanderers

- Chilean Primera División: 2001
