= Roberto Castillo (footballer, born 1984) =

Chilean footballer (born 1984)

Personal information
- Full name: Roberto Jesús Castillo Guerrero
- Date of birth: January 5, 1984 (age 42)
- Place of birth: Santiago, Chile
- Height: 1.74 m (5 ft 9 in)
- Position: Forward

Senior career*
Years	Team	Apps	(Gls)
2000-2006	Palestino	113	(21)
2006	Everton	13	(0)
2007-2012	Antofagasta	104	(24)
2008-2009	→ Deportes La Serena (loan)	52	(10)
2012	San Marcos de Arica	20	(1)
2013-2014	Deportes Concepción	29	(4)
2015	Iberia	5	(1)
Total		336	(61)
- * Club domestic league appearances and goals

Roberto Jesús Castillo Guerrero (born January 5, 1984, in Santiago, Chile) is a Chilean former footballer who played as a striker.

== Teams ==
- (Chile) Palestino 2000–2006
- (Chile) Everton 2006
- (Chile) Deportes Antofagasta 2007
- (Chile) Deportes La Serena 2008–2009
- (Chile) Deportes Antofagasta 2010–2012
- (Chile) San Marcos de Arica 2012
- (Chile) Deportes Concepción 2013–2014
- (Chile) Iberia 2015

== Titles ==
- (Chile) Deportes Antofagasta 2011 (Torneo Apertura Primera B Championship)
- (Chile) San Marcos de Arica 2012 (Torneo Apertura Primera B Championship)
