= Juan Robledo =

Chilean footballer (born 1979)

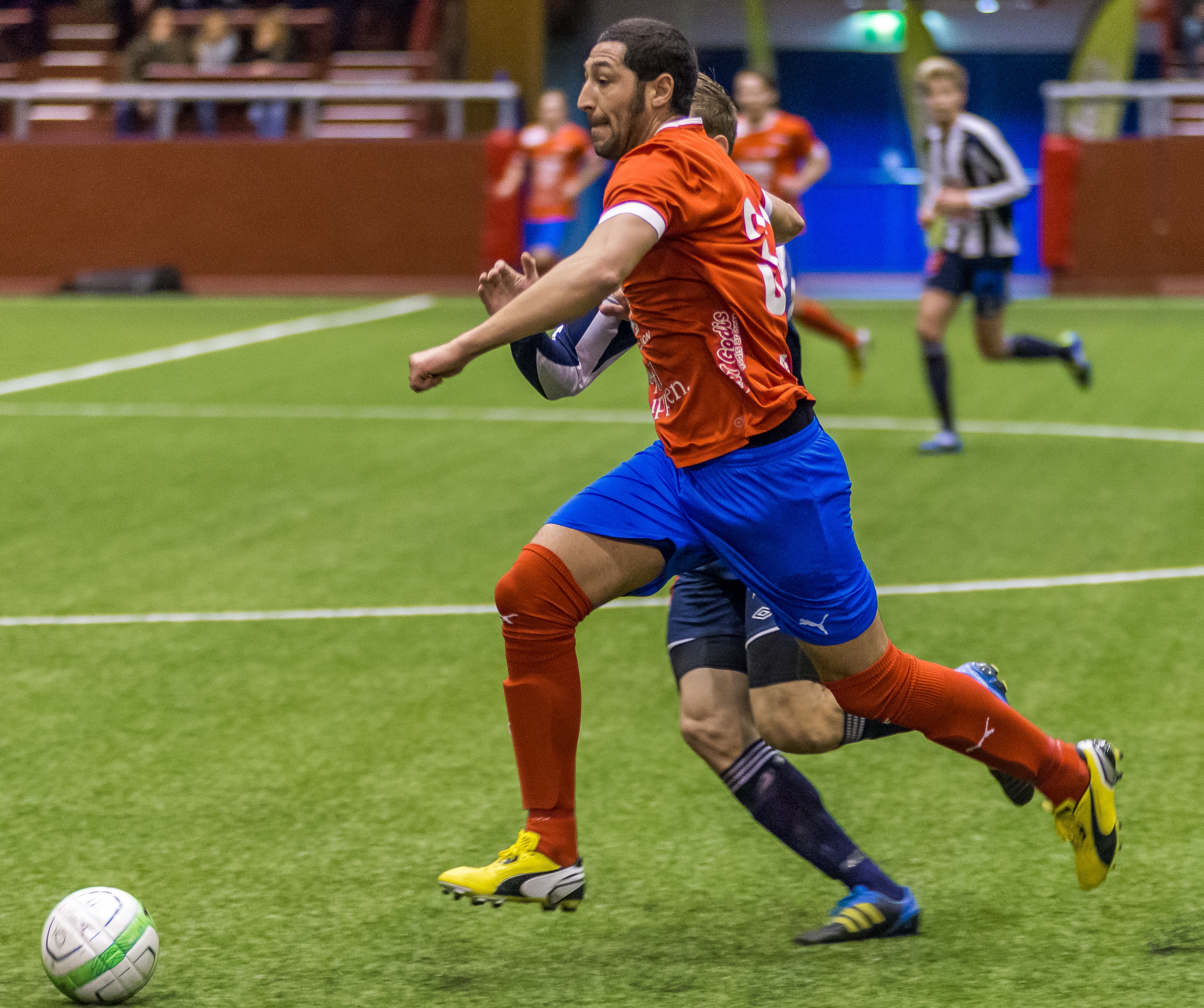
- Robledo with Östers IF in 2013

Personal information
- Full name: Juan Orlando Robledo Bustos
- Date of birth: 21 August 1979 (age 47)
- Place of birth: Santiago, Chile
- Height: 1.96 m (6 ft 5 in)
- Position: Defender

Team information
- Current team: IFK Värnamo (assistant)

Youth career
- Audax Italiano

Senior career*
Years	Team	Apps	(Gls)
1999–2003	Audax Italiano	44	(0)
2004–2005	Unión San Felipe	59	(6)
2006	Santiago Morning	29	(2)
2007	Santiago Wanderers	14	(0)
2008–2011	Mjällby AIF	73	(5)
2011–2012	Kasımpaşa	31	(2)
2012	Mjällby AIF	5	(0)
2013	Östers IF	12	(0)
2014	IFK Värnamo	24	(4)
2015–2017	FK Karlskrona	19	(1)
Total		301	(20)

Managerial career
- 2018: FK Karlskrona (assistant)
- 2018: FK Karlskrona
- 2019–2021: Mjällby AIF (assistant)
- 2022–2024: Mjällby AIF U19
- 2025–: IFK Värnamo (assistant)
- * Club domestic league appearances and goals

Juan Orlando Robledo Bustos (born 21 August 1979) is a retired Chilean footballer who played as a defender and coach. He is currently the assistant coach of IFK Värnamo.

== Club career ==
After a year in Turkey he returned to Sweden and Mjällby AIF in August 2012, but in December he chose not to extend his contract with the club. In January 2013 he signed for Östers IF. In February 2014, he once again changed teams when he signed with IFK Värnamo.

== Coaching career ==
Robledo began his career with FK Karlskrona.

In 2025, he was appointed the assistant coach of IFK Värnamo.

== Honours ==
=== Player ===
Mjällby AIF

- Superettan: 2009
