= Héctor Berríos =

Chilean footballer (born 1986)

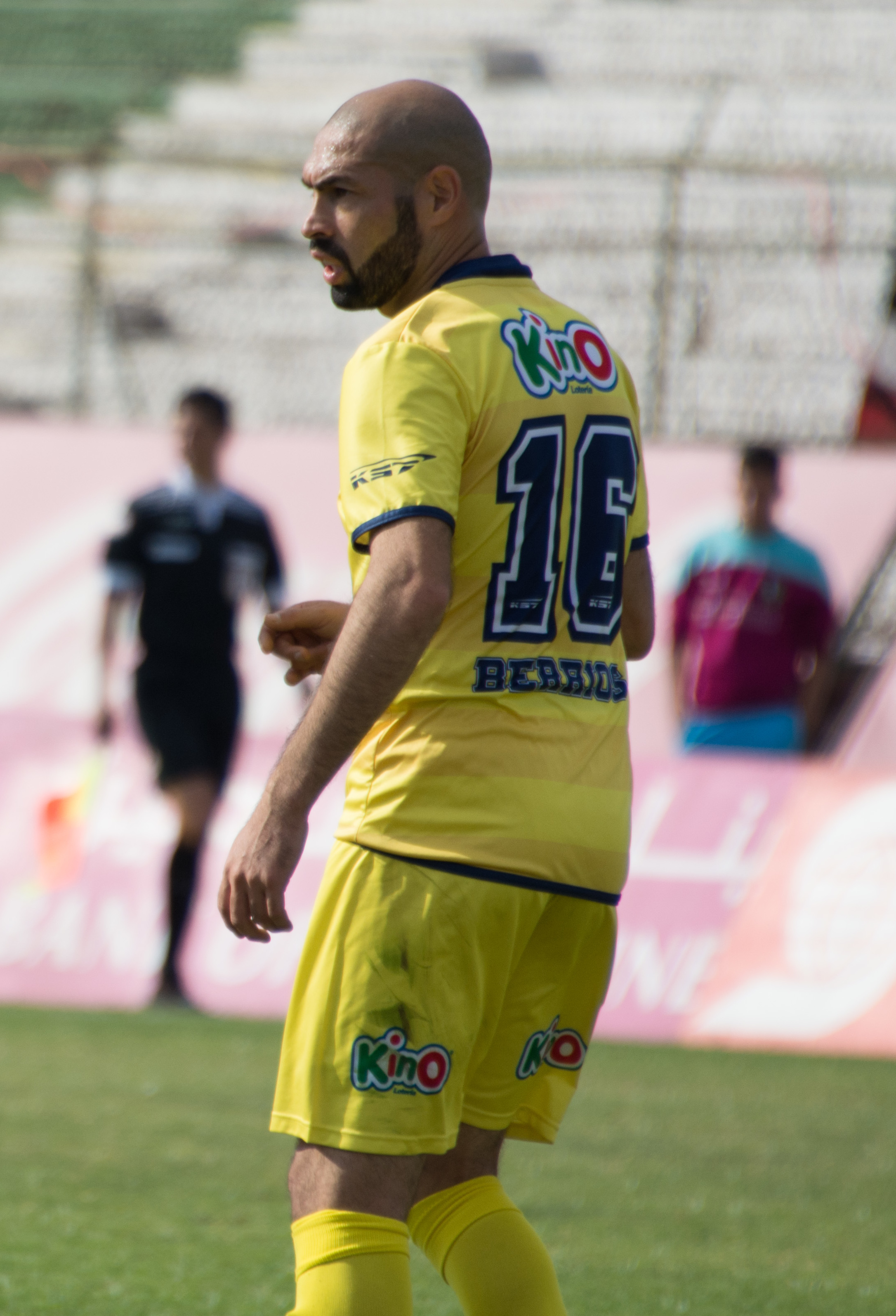
- Berrios in 2018

Personal information
- Full name: Héctor Eduardo Berríos Ibarra
- Date of birth: 24 April 1978 (age 48)
- Place of birth: Santiago, Chile
- Height: 1.83 m (6 ft 0 in)
- Position: Midfielder

Senior career*
Years	Team	Apps	(Gls)
2004–2009	Melipilla		
2010	Deportes Concepción		
2011–2018	U. de Concepción		
2012	→ Cobresal (loan)		
2019–	Iquique		
- * Club domestic league appearances and goals as of 22 March 2020

Héctor Eduardo Berríos Ibarra (born 18 October 1986) is a Chilean professional footballer who plays as a midfielder for Deportes Iquique.

== Honours ==
Deportes Melipilla

- Primera B: 2004, 2006

Universidad de Concepción

- Copa Chile: 2014–15
