= Nelson León Sánchez =

Chilean footballer (born 1966)

Personal information
- Full name: Nelson Hernán León Sánchez
- Date of birth: 3 October 1966 (age 60)
- Place of birth: Chile
- Position: Forward

Senior career*
Years	Team	Apps	(Gls)
- Guaraní
- Libertad
1990	Tembetary		
- Magallanes
- Deportes La Serena
1995–1996	Persma Manado		
1996–1997	Arema Malang		
1997–1998	Persema Malang		
1998–2000	PSMS Medan		

Managerial career
- 2019–2020: Persiba Bantul
- 2022: PSGJ Cirebon
- * Club domestic league appearances and goals

Nelson Hernán León Sánchez (born 3 October 1966), known as Nelson León Sánchez or Nelson Sanchez, is a Chilean former professional footballer who played as a forward for clubs in Paraguay, Chile, Greece and Indonesia.

== Playing career ==
León Sánchez played in Paraguay for Guaraní, Libertad and Tembetary until the club was relegated to the second division. Then, he returned to his country of birth and played for Magallanes and Deportes La Serena.

After a stint in the Greek football, he came to Indonesia in 1995 to play for Persma Manado, where he coincided with his compatriots Rodrigo Araya and Juan Rodríguez Rubio. In 1996 he switched to Arema Malang, coinciding with his compatriots Juan Rodríguez Rubio, again, and Julio César Moreno, becoming the first Latin trio to play for the club.

He also played for Persema Malang and PSMS Medan. He retired in 2000.

== Agent career ==
In 2001 he became a football agent by starting a company called "PT Sanchezgoal Management" based in Cinere, Depok. He has been the representative of players such as Mohamed Sissoko, Ronald Fagundez, Arthur Cunha and Patrick Cruz.

He also was the representative of his compatriot Julio Lopez along with his father, Luis.

== Past Controversies ==
He and his wife was involved in a case of human trafficking in Paraguay since they took about thirty Indonesian teenagers to that country with no papers, according to the Paraguayan judicial authorities. In principle, the Indonesian teenagers, who were young football players, would be educated and trained in the country to represent Paraguay in the future in the context of a sport project where also took part well-known professional coached such as Miguel Ángel Arrué and Hugo Villasanti.

However, this case also proves to be dubious as it gained notoriety after the local government of Aceh, from which the Indonesian teenagers were from, did not fulfill the promised deal. This stipend was to cover the teenagers' living costs and papers, which were then handled by Leon Sanchez and his wife to ensure they received good living conditions whilst abroad.

When he served as the representative of his compatriot Nelson San Martín, the agreed conditions to live in Indonesia weren't suitable, according to San Martín.

== Coaching career ==
In November 2019, he became the coach of Persiba Bantul in the Indonesian Liga 3.

In 2022, he coached PSGJ Cirebon in the same league.

== Personal life ==
He married the Indonesian Teti Citra Resmi Rahayu and has three daughters who all live in Indonesia and made his home in Indonesia.
