= Roberto Luco (footballer, born 1985) =

Chilean footballer

Personal information
- Full name: Roberto Esteban Luco Álvarez
- Date of birth: 3 May 1985 (age 41)
- Place of birth: Valparaíso, Chile
- Height: 1.66 m (5 ft 5 in)
- Position: Attacking midfielder

Youth career
- Santiago Wanderers

Senior career*
Years	Team	Apps	(Gls)
2001–2012	Santiago Wanderers	148	(5)
2007	→ Trasandino (loan)	–	(–)
2011	→ Ñublense (loan)	9	(1)
2013	Deportes Linares	18	(6)
2018	Deportivo FATIC	–	(–)
Total		175	(12)
- * Club domestic league appearances and goals

Roberto Esteban Luco Álvarez (born 3 May 1985) is a Chilean former footballer who played as an attacking midfielder.

== Career ==
He is remembered for his spell at Santiago Wanderers. In 2018 he moved to Bolivia and joined Club Deportivo FATIC in the Asociación de Fútbol de La Paz, where he coincided with his compatriot Francisco Pedraza.

== Honours ==
=== Club ===
Santiago Wanderers

- Primera División de Chile (1): 2001
