= Emanuel Reynoso (footballer, born 1983) =

Argentine footballer

Personal information
- Full name: Emanuel Alberto Reynoso
- Date of birth: 1 February 1984 (age 42)
- Place of birth: Mendoza, Argentina
- Height: 1.84 m (6 ft 1/2 in)
- Position: Striker

Youth career
- Godoy Cruz

Senior career*
Years	Team	Apps	(Gls)
2001–2003	Godoy Cruz	28	(1)
2004–2005	Juventud Unida Universitario		
2005–2006	Deportivo Maipú	41	(22)
2007	Huracán TA	17	(3)
2007	Universidad de Concepción	20	(7)
2008	Deportivo Azogues	20	(3)
2008–2009	Deportivo Maipú	38	(9)
2010	Jorge Wilstermann	0	(0)
2010–2012	Desamparados	66	(10)
2012–2013	Deportivo Maipú	32	(7)
2013–2015	Juventud Unida Universitario	65	(11)
2016–2017	Independiente Rivadavia	33	(4)
2017–2018	Unión Villa Krause	30	(4)
2019	Juventud Alianza	6	(1)
2020	Colón Junior	3	(0)
2022	Unión Villa Krause	8	(1)
- * Club domestic league appearances and goals

Emanuel Alberto Reynoso (born 1 February 1983 in Mendoza) is an Argentine former football striker.

== Career ==
Reynoso started playing in Godoy Cruz, where it passes in each of the lower divisions, and made his debut in 2001.

In 2003, Reynosa went to Juventud Unida Universitario of the Torneo Argentino A equivalent to the Third Division Argentina, then march to Deportivo Maipú of the Torneo Argentino B, which is contained.

He did this after playing in the Universidad de Concepción of the First Division of Chile, where he was top scorer of the team.

He went by Deportivo Azogues in Ecuador, where he played in the Ecuadorian championship 2008.

In 2008, he returned to Deportivo Maipú.
