= Diego Díaz (footballer, born 1988) =

Chilean footballer (born 1988)

Personal information
- Full name: Diego Alfonso Díaz García
- Date of birth: 13 October 1988 (age 38)
- Place of birth: Santiago, Chile
- Height: 1.78 m (5 ft 10 in)
- Position: Defender

Senior career*
Years	Team	Apps	(Gls)
2007–2010	Palestino	58	(3)
2011	Deportes Copiapó	31	(3)
2012	Deportes Temuco	10	(2)
2013	Lota Schwager	4	(0)
Total		103	(8)
- * Club domestic league appearances and goals

Diego Alonso Díaz García (born 13 October 1988) is a Chilean former footballer who played as a defender.

He has played for Chilean first-tier team Palestino.
