= Christian Gálvez (footballer) =

Chilean footballer (born 1979)

Personal information
- Full name: Christian del Tránsito Gálvez Núñez
- Date of birth: 9 December 1979 (age 46)
- Place of birth: Machalí Chile
- Height: 1.78 m (5 ft 10 in)
- Position: Defender

Senior career*
| Years | Team | Apps | (Gls) |
| 1999–2001 | O'Higgins | 77 | (29) |
| 2002–2003 | Santiago Wanderers | 36 | (14) |
| 2003 | Universidad Católica | 8 | (0) |
| 2003 | Palestino | 11 | (0) |
| 2004 | Colo-Colo | 33 | (2) |
| 2005–2006 | Cobresal | 19 | (0) |
| 2006–2007 | Santiago Wanderers | 55 | (13) |
| 2008–2010 | Rangers | 44 | (0) |
| 2011 | Curicó Unido | 15 | (0) |
| 2012–2013 | Magallanes | 17 | (0) |
- * Club domestic league appearances and goals as of 4 April 2020

Christian del Tránsito Gálvez Núñez (born 9 December 1979) is a Chilean retired footballer. He finished his career at Magallanes.
