= Juan Rodríguez Vega =

Chilean footballer and manager (1944–2021)

Personal information
- Full name: Juan Carlos Rodríguez Vega
- Date of birth: 16 January 1944
- Place of birth: Santiago, Chile
- Date of death: 1 September 2021 (aged 77)
- Height: 1.70 m (5 ft 7 in)
- Position: Defender

Senior career*
Years	Team	Apps	(Gls)
1963–1969	Universidad de Chile		
1970–1971	Unión Española	10	(0)
1971–1977	Atlético Español	77	(1)
1978	Colo-Colo		
1979	Coquimbo Unido		
1980	Ñublense		

International career
1968–1974	Chile	26	(0)

Managerial career
- 1981: Ñublense
- 1981: San Luis
- 1982: Santiago Wanderers
- 1983: Deportes La Serena
- 1984–1985: Coquimbo Unido
- 1990: Unión Española (youth)
- 1995: Colo-Colo (youth)
- 2002: PSMS Medan
- 2004: Persita Tangerang
- 2004–2005: Sowite Raha
- 2005: Kendari Utama
- * Club domestic league appearances and goals

Juan Carlos Rodríguez Vega (16 January 1944 – 1 September 2021) was a Chilean footballer and manager who played as a defender. He made 26 appearances for the Chile national team.

== Club career ==
Rodríguez began his playing career with Chilean first division club C.F. Universidad de Chile. He won the Chilean league four times (1964, 1965, 1967 and 1969) with Universidad de Chile. He moved to Primera División (First Division) side Atlético Español in 1973, the club where he would win the 1975 CONCACAF Champions' Cup.

On 6 April 1965, Rodríguez Vega was one of the constituent footballers of SIFUP, the trade union of professionales footballers in Chile, alongside fellows such as Pedro Araya, Manuel Astorga, Rubén Marcos, among others.

== International career ==
Rodríguez played for the Chile national team at the 1974 FIFA World Cup finals in West Germany.

== Managerial career ==
After playing for Ñublense, in 1981, he began his managerial career in the same club, working for several Chilean clubs in both the Primera and Segunda División, and for Indonesian clubs, coaching PSMS Medan in 2002 and Persita Tangerang alongside his brother Manuel in 2004.

== Personal life ==
He had two older brothers who were professional footballers: Gabriel Rodríguez Vega and Manuel Rodríguez Vega.

His sons, Juan and Francisco Rodríguez Rubio, were also professional footballers who made his career mainly in Indonesia.

== Honours ==
Universidad de Chile

- Primera División: 1964, 1965, 1967, 1969
- Torneo Metropolitano: 1968, 1969
- Copa Francisco Candelori: 1969

Atlético Español

- CONCACAF Champions' Cup: 1975
