= 2021 Club Deportivo Universidad Católica season =

81th season in existence of Club Deportivo Universidad Católica

Universidad Católica
2021 season
- President: Juan Tagle
- Head coach: Gustavo Poyet (until 30 August); Cristian Paulucci (interim, from 31 August, until 15 September); Cristian Paulucci (from 15 September)
- Stadium: San Carlos de Apoquindo
- League: 1st
- Copa Chile: Round of 16
- Supercopa: Winners
- Libertadores: Round of 16
- Top goalscorer: League: Fernando Zampedri (23); All: Fernando Zampedri (27)
- Highest home attendance: 9454 vs Santiago Wanderers (20 October 2021)
- Lowest home attendance: 1460 vs Everton (22 August 2021)
- Average home league attendance: 5834
- Biggest win: Universidad Católica 4–0 Deportes Melipilla; Universidad Católica 4–0 Antofagasta
- Biggest defeat: Universidad Católica 0–3 Palestino
Home colours	Away colours	Third colours

The 2021 Club Deportivo Universidad Católica season was the 81st season and the club's 47th consecutive season in the top flight of Chilean football. In addition to the domestic league, Universidad Católica also competed in the Copa Chile, the Supercopa de Chile, and the Copa Libertadores.

== Squad ==
As of December 2021

No.	Player	Nationality	Position	Date of birth (age)	Year signed	Signed from
Goalkeepers
25	Sebastián Pérez	(Chile)	GK	2 December 1990 (age 31)	2021	Deportes Iquique
28	Vicente Bernedo	(Chile)	GK	22 January 2001 (age 20)	2020	Academy
Defenders
2	Germán Lanaro	(Argentina) (Chile)	CB	21 March 1986 (age 35)	2015	Palestino
3	Cristóbal Finch	(Chile)	CB	1 June 2002 (age 19)	2020	Academy
4	Carlos Salomón	(Chile)	CB	28 March 2000 (age 21)	2020	Academy
5	Valber Huerta	(Chile)	CB	26 August 1993 (age 28)	2019	Huachipato
7	Tomás Asta-Buruaga	(Chile)	RB / CB	11 October 1996 (age 25)	2020	Deportes Antofagasta
14	Juan Fuentes	(Chile)	CB / DM	21 March 1995 (age 26)	2020	Estudiantes
17	Branco Ampuero	(Chile)	CB	19 July 1993 (age 28)	2021	Deportes Antofagasta
19	José Pedro Fuenzalida (captain)	(Chile)	RB / RWB / RW	22 February 1985 (age 36)	2016	Boca Juniors
21	Raimundo Rebolledo	(Chile)	RB / RWB	14 May 1997 (age 24)	2015	Academy
23	Juan Cornejo	(Chile)	LB / RB	27 February 1990 (age 31)	2019	León
24	Alfonso Parot	(Chile)	LB / RB	15 October 1989 (age 32)	2019	Rosario Central
32	Benjamín Gómez	(Chile)	CB	4 January 2001 (age 20)	2021	Academy
Midfielders
8	Ignacio Saavedra	(Chile)	CM / DM	12 January 1999 (age 22)	2018	Academy
11	Luciano Aued	(Argentina)	CM / DM	1 March 1987 (age 34)	2017	Racing
13	Felipe Gutiérrez	(Chile)	AM / CM	8 October 1990 (age 31)	2021	Kansas City
18	Diego Buonanotte	(Argentina)	AM	19 April 1988 (age 33)	2016	AEK
22	Juan Leiva	(Chile)	AM / CM	11 November 1993 (age 28)	2021	Unión La Calera
26	Marcelino Núñez	(Chile)	AM / CM	1 March 2000 (age 21)	2020	Academy
Forwards
9	Fernando Zampedri	(Argentina)	ST	14 February 1988 (age 33)	2020	Rosario Central
10	Edson Puch	(Chile)	LW	9 April 1986 (age 35)	2019	Querétaro
15	Gastón Lezcano	(Argentina)	RW	21 November 1986 (age 35)	2020	Morelia
16	Clemente Montes	(Chile)	LW	25 April 2001 (age 20)	2020	Academy
20	Gonzalo Tapia	(Chile)	RW	18 February 2002 (age 19)	2020	Academy
27	Alexander Aravena	(Chile)	ST	6 September 2002 (age 19)	2020	Academy
30	Diego Valencia	(Chile)	ST / RW	14 January 2000 (age 21)	2018	Academy
32	Fabián Orellana	(Chile)	RW / LW	27 January 1986 (age 35)	2021	Real Valladolid
35	Nicolás Sepúlveda	(Chile)	RW	22 August 2002 (age 19)	2021	Academy
Player(s) on transfers during this season
1	Matías Dituro	(Argentina)	GK	8 May 1987 (age 34)	2018	Bolívar
Player(s) on retirated during this season
6	Francisco Silva	(Chile)	CM / DM	11 February 1986 (age 35)	2019	Independiente

== Transfers ==
=== In ===
Date	Pos.	Name	From	Type	Ref.
19 December 2020	FW	(Argentina) Fernando Zampedri	(Argentina) Rosario Central	€1,590,000	
1 January 2021	DF	(Chile) Juan Cornejo	(Mexico) León	Free transfer	
28 February 2021	Coach	(Uruguay) Gustavo Poyet	-	Free transfer	
2 March 2021	DF	(Chile) Tomás Asta-Buruaga	Deportes Antofagasta	€409.000	
4 March 2021	MF	(Chile) Juan Leiva	Unión La Calera	€455.000	
5 March 2021	GK	(Chile) Sebastián Pérez	Deportes Iquique	€318.000	
18 March 2021	DF	(Chile) Branco Ampuero	Deportes Antofagasta	€273.000	
19 March 2021	MF	(Chile) Felipe Gutiérrez	(United States) Kansas City	Free transfer	
31 August 2021	Coach	(Argentina) Cristian Paulucci	-	Free transfer	
6 September 2021	FW	(Chile) Fabián Orellana	(Spain) Real Valladolid	Free transfer	

=== Out ===
Date	Pos.	Name	To	Type	Ref.
22 December 2020	MF	(Chile) Andrés Souper	Deportes Antofagasta	€250.000	
31 December 2020	DF	(Chile) Benjamín Vidal	Coquimbo Unido	Contract terminated	
31 December 2020	FW	(Chile) Diego Vallejos	Coquimbo Unido	Contract terminated	
1 January 2021	FW	(Chile) Brian Leiva	Deportes Melipilla	Contract terminated	
18 February 2021	Coach	(Argentina) Ariel Holan	(Brazil) Santos	Contract terminated	
28 February 2021	DF	(Chile) Vicente Fernández	Palestino	€250.000	
9 March 2021	MF	(Chile) Jaime Carreño	Deportes La Serena	Contract terminated	
11 March 2021	MF	(Chile) Kevin Medel	Universidad de Concepción	Contract terminated	
30 August 2021	Coach	(Uruguay) Gustavo Poyet	-	Contract terminated	
3 September 2021	MF	(Chile) Francisco Silva	-	Retired	

=== Loans out ===
Date	Position	Name	From	End date	Ref.
18 February 2021	GK	(Chile) Cristopher Toselli	Palestino	End of season	
21 February 2021	DF	(Chile) Enzo Ferrario	Deportes La Serena	End of season	
21 February 2021	DF	(Chile) Yerco Oyanedel	Unión La Calera	End of season	
4 March 2021	FW	(Chile) César Munder	Deportes La Serena	End of season	
5 March 2021	DF	(Venezuela) Aaron Astudillo	Deportes Melipilla	End of season	
11 March 2021	FW	(Chile) Bruno Barticciotto	Palestino	End of season	
8 July 2021	GK	(Argentina) Matías Dituro	(Spain) Celta de Vigo	30 June 2022	
1 May 2021	MF	(Chile) Ian Toro	Deportes Copiapó	30 December 2022	

=== New contracts ===
Date	Pos.	Name	Contract length	Contract ends	Ref.
19 December 2020	FW	(Argentina) Fernando Zampedri	3-year	2023	
26 December 2020	MF	(Argentina) Luciano Aued	1-year	2021	
26 December 2020	MF	(Argentina) Diego Buonanotte	1-year	2021	
26 December 2020	DF	(Chile) Juan Cornejo	1-year	2021	
26 December 2020	FW	(Argentina) Gastón Lezcano	1-year	2021	
2 March 2021	DF	(Chile) Tomás Asta-Buruaga	4-year	2024	
17 Juny 2021	DF	(Chile) Juan Fuentes	1-year	2022	

== Competitions ==
=== Overview ===
Competition	First match	Last match	Starting round	Final position	Record							
Competition	First match	Last match	Starting round	Final position	Pld	W	D	L	GF	GA	GD	Win %
League	28 March 2021	4 December 2021	Matchday 1	Winners	32	22	2	8	65	34	+31	68.75
Copa Chile	22 June 2021	3 July 2021	Second round	Round of 16	4	0	3	1	5	7	−2	0.00
Supercopa de Chile	18 November 2021	18 November 2021	-	Winners	1	0	1	0	1	1	+0	0.00
Copa Libertadores	22 April 2021	24 July 2021	Group stage	Round of 16	8	3	0	5	6	8	−2	37.50
Total					45	25	6	14	77	50	+27	55.56

Last updated: December 2021
Source: Soccerway

=== Primera Division ===
==== League table ====
Pos	Team	Pld	W	D	L	GF	GA	GD	Pts	Qualification or relegation
1	Universidad Católica (C)	32	22	2	8	65	34	+31	68	Qualification for Copa Libertadores group stage
2	Colo-Colo	32	19	5	8	49	26	+23	62	Qualification for Copa Libertadores group stage
3	Audax Italiano	32	14	12	6	39	31	+8	54	Qualification for Copa Libertadores second stage
4	Unión La Calera	32	15	6	11	41	40	+1	51	Qualification for Copa Sudamericana first stage
5	Unión Española	32	15	3	14	48	50	−2	48	Qualification for Copa Sudamericana first stage

Source: ANFP, Soccerway
Rules for classification: 1) Points, 2) Playoff game (only if needed to decide championship between two teams), 3) Goal difference, 4) Matches won, 5) Goals for, 6) Away goals for, 7) Red cards, 8) Yellow cards, 9) Drawing of lots.
(C) Champions

==== Results summary ====
Overall								Home						Away					
Pld	W	D	L	GF	GA	GD	Pts	W	D	L	GF	GA	GD	W	D	L	GF	GA	GD
32	22	2	8	65	34	+31	68	14	2	0	39	12	+27	8	0	8	26	22	+4

Source: Primera Division

==== Results by round ====
Round	1	2	3	4	5	6	7	8	9	10	11	12	13	14	15	16	17	18	19	20	21	22	23	24	25	26	27	28	29	30	31	32	33	34
Ground	A	H	A	H	F	A	H	A	H	A	H	H	A	A	H	A	H	H	A	H	A	F	H	A	H	A	H	A	A	H	H	A	H	A
Result	W	W	L	W	F	L	W	L	W	W	E	W	L	L	W	L	W	E	L	W	W	F	W	W	W	W	W	L	W	W	W	W	W	W
Position	5	1	3	1	3	7	3	6	4	2	3	1	2	4	3	4	3	4	5	3	2	3	3	2	2	2	2	2	2	2	2	1	1	1

Source: Primera Division
A = Away; H = Home; W = Win; D = Draw; L = Loss; F = Free round

==== Matches ====
28 March 2021 1	Ñublense	0:1	Universidad Católica	Chillán
		Report	27' (a.g.) Fontanini	Stadium: Nelson Oyarzún; Attendance: 0 Referee: Rodrigo Carvajal

4 April 2021 2	Universidad Católica	2:1	Palestino	Las Condes
	Zampedri 28' (pen.); Valencia 50'	Report	81' (pen.) Jiménez	Stadium: San Carlos; Referee: Fernando Véjar

10 April 2021 3	Audax Italiano	1:0	Universidad Católica	Rancagua
	Torres 67'	Report		Stadium: El Teniente; Referee: Julio Bascuñán

16 April 2021 4	Universidad Católica	2:1	Curicó Unido	Las Condes
	Buonanotte 12'; Zampedri 45+2'	Report	53' Benegas	Stadium: San Carlos; Referee: José Cabero

Round 5 - Free

2 May 2021 6	Deportes Melipilla	2:0	Universidad Católica	La Calera
	Vidangossy 65'; Sosa 75'	Report		Stadium: Nicolás Chahuán; Referee: Julio Bascuñán

8 May 2021 7	Universidad Católica	3:0	Unión La Calera	Las Condes
	Huerta 1'; Valencia 51'	Report		Stadium: San Carlos; Referee: Christian Rojas

23 May 2021 8	Unión Española	3:2	Universidad Católica	Independencia
	Farfán 24'; Núñez 52'; Palacios 63'	Report	47' Zampedri; 76' Valencia	Stadium: Santa Laura; Referee: Cristian Garay

30 May 2021 9	Universidad Católica	2:1	Cobresal	Las Condes
	Zampedri 73' (pen.), 90+5'	Report	9' Varas	Stadium: San Carlos; Referee: César Deischler

5 June 2021 10	Santiago Wanderers	0:1	Universidad Católica	Valparaíso
		Report	49' Cornejo	Stadium: Elías Figueroa; Referee: Christian Rojas

18 July 2021 11	Universidad Católica	0:0	Colo-Colo	Las Condes
		Report		Stadium: San Carlos; Referee: José Cabero

25 July 2021 12	Universidad Católica	3:0	O'Higgins	Las Condes
	Lanaro 50'; Cahais 78' (a.g.); Gutiérrez 86'	Report		Stadium: San Carlos; Referee: Cristian Droguett

29 July 2021 13	Deportes Antofagasta	3:2	Universidad Católica	Antofagasta
	Demartini 2'; Flores 52'; Figueroa 69'	Report	63' (pen.) Zampedri; 79' Huerta	Stadium: Calvo y Bascuñán; Referee: Julio Bascuñán

1 August 2021 14	Universidad de Chile	2:1	Universidad Católica	Rancagua
	Larrivey 62', 89'	Report	69' Zampedri	Stadium: El Teniente; Referee: Roberto Tobar

7 August 2021 15	Universidad Católica	4:3	Deportes La Serena	Las Condes
	Valencia 31'; Zampedri 33', 74'; Núñez 39'	Report	11' Martínez; 80' Paredes; 88' Munder	Stadium: San Carlos; Referee: Christian Rojas

15 August 2021 16	Huachipato	2:1	Universidad Católica	Talcahuano
	Gazzolo 17'; Martínez 23'	Report	45+7' Huerta	Stadium: Huachipato-CAP; Attendance: 971; Referee: Manuel Vergara

22 August 2021 17	Universidad Católica	2:0	Everton	Las Condes
	Núñez 45', 54'	Report		Stadium: San Carlos; Attendance: 1.460; Referee: Nicolás Gamboa

25 August 2021 18	Universidad Católica	2:2	Ñublense	Las Condes
	Asta-Buruaga 80'; Valencia 87'	Report	42' Cerezo; 67' Mateos	Stadium: San Carlos; Attendance: 1.634; Referee: Héctor Jona

28 August 2021 19	Palestino	3:0	Universidad Católica	La Cisterna
	Carrasco 84' (pen.), 90+2' (pen.); Dávila 90+3'	Report		Stadium: Municipal; Attendance: 750; Referee: Piero Maza

7 September 2021 20	Universidad Católica	3:1	Audax Italiano	Las Condes
	Zampedri 28' (pen.); Leiva 47'; Parot 90+1'		83' Palacios	Stadium: San Carlos; Attendance: 3.102; Referee: Francisco Gilabert

12 September 2021 21	Curicó Unido	2:4	Universidad Católica	Curicó
	Benegas 33'; Fritz 45'	Report	23', 32' Zampedri; 73' Valencia; 87' Fuenzalida	Stadium: La Granja; Referee: Julio Bascuñán

Round 22 - Free

29 September 2021 23	Universidad Católica	4:0	Deportes Melipilla	Las Condes
	40' Gutiérrez; 71' Zampedri; 90' Valencia; 90+6' Buonanotte	Report		Stadium: San Carlos; Attendance: 3.211; Referee: Eduardo Gamboa

2 October 2021 24	Unión La Calera	0:2	Universidad Católica	La Calera
		Report	45' Valencia; 71' Zampedri	Stadium: Nicolás Chahuán; Referee: Roberto Tobar

6 October 2021 25	Universidad Católica	2:1	Unión Española	Las Condes
	29' Fuenzalida; 75' Zampedri	Report	90+3' Víctor Méndez	Stadium: San Carlos; Attendance: 8863; Referee: Ángelo Hermosilla

16 October 2021 26	Cobresal	1:3	Universidad Católica	El Salvador
	Pardo 14'	Report	21', 53' Núñez; 87' Valencia	Stadium: El Cobre; Referee: Cristian Garay

20 October 2021 27	Universidad Católica	3:2	Santiago Wanderers	Las Condes
	Zampedri 20' (pen.), 39'; Puch 31'	Report	26' Soto; 85' Arce	Stadium: San Carlos; Attendance: 9.454; Referee: Roberto Tobar

24 October 2021 28	Colo-Colo	2:1	Universidad Católica	Macul
	Solari 74'; Parraguez 90+4'	Report	37' Valencia	Stadium: Monumental; Attendance: 27.090; Referee: Julio Bascuñán

31 October 2021 29	O'Higgins	1:3	Universidad Católica	Rancagua
	Fernández 27'	Report	80' (pen.), 87' Zampedri; 90+1' Valencia	Stadium: El Teniente; Attendance: 5.370; Referee: Fernando Véjar

4 November 2021 30	Universidad Católica	4:0	Deportes Antofagasta	Las Condes
	Valencia 13'; Zampedri 67', 90+1'; Núñez 70'	Report		Stadium: San Carlos; Attendance: 7.931; Referee: Cristian Garay

7 November 2021 31	Universidad Católica	1:0	Universidad de Chile	Las Condes
	Zampedri 47'	Report		Stadium: San Carlos; Attendance: 8.506; Referee: Julio Bascuñán

13 November 2021 32	Deportes La Serena	0:2	Universidad Católica	La Serena
		Report	25' Montes; 70' Parot	Stadium: La Portada; Referee: José Cabero

28 November 2021 33	Universidad Católica	2:0	Huachipato	Las Condes
	Valencia 7'; Zampedri 37'	Report		Stadium: San Carlos; Attendance: 8.348; Referee: Felipe González

4 December 2021 34	Everton	0:3	Universidad Católica	Viña del Mar
		Report	37' (a.g.) Barroso; 48' Parot; 85' Gutiérrez	Stadium: Sausalito; Referee: Julio Bascuñán

=== Supercopa de Chile ===
18 November 2021	Universidad Católica	1–1 (7–6 p)	Ñublense	Estadio Ester Roa, Concepción
19:00 UTC−3	Zampedri 78' (pen.)	Report	Mateos 69'	Attendance: 15,000; Referee: Francisco Gilabert
	Penalties
	Buonanotte (penalty missed); Núñez (penalty scored); Parot (penalty scored); Saavedra (penalty scored); Zampedri (penalty scored); Asta-Buruaga (penalty scored); Huerta (penalty scored); Valencia (penalty scored)		(penalty missed) Mateos; (penalty scored) Rivera; (penalty scored) Abrigo; (penalty scored) Guerra; (penalty scored) Vargas; (penalty scored) Pérez; (penalty scored) Cerezo; (penalty missed) Navarrete

=== Copa Chile ===
==== Second round ====
22 June 2021	Deportes Iquique	1–1	Universidad Católica	Iquique
20:00	Fernández 79'	Report	Salomón 45+3'	Stadium: Tierra de Campeones; Attendance: 0 Referee: Felipe González

26 June 2021	Universidad Católica	4–4 (5–5 agg.) (9–8 p)	Deportes Iquique	Las Condes, Santiago
20:30	Parot 23'; Buonanotte 58'; Zampedri 64'; Valencia 68'	Report	Ramos 2'; Espinosa 5'; Oroz 47', 79'	Stadium: San Carlos de Apoquindo; Attendance: 0 Referee: Francisco Gilabert
	Penalties
	Buonanotte (penalty scored); Aued (penalty scored); Valencia (penalty scored); Asta-Buruaga (penalty scored); Zampedri (penalty scored); Silva (penalty scored); Fuenzalida (penalty scored); Cornejo (penalty missed); Huerta (penalty scored); Salomón (penalty scored)		(penalty scored) Santander; (penalty scored) Salinas; (penalty scored) Fernández; (penalty scored) Oroz; (penalty scored) Espinosa; (penalty scored) Mellado; (penalty scored) Hidalgo; (penalty missed) Contreras; (penalty scored) Soria; (penalty missed) Coronel

==== Round of 16 ====
30 June 2021	Everton	0–0	Universidad Católica	Viña del Mar
20:30		Report		Stadium: Sausalito; Attendance: 0 Referee: José Cabero

3 July 2021	Universidad Católica	0–2 (0–2 agg.)	Everton	Las Condes, Santiago
15:00		Report	Cerato 5'; Echeverría 32'	Stadium: San Carlos de Apoquindo; Attendance: 0 Referee: Eduardo Gamboa

=== Copa Libertadores ===
==== Group stage ====
The group stage draw was held on 15 April 2021.

Pos	Team	Pld	W	D	L	GF	GA	GD	Pts	Qualification	ARG	UCA	NAC	ATN
1	(Argentina) Argentinos Juniors	6	4	0	2	7	3	+4	12	Round of 16	—	0–1	2–0	1–0
2	(Chile) Universidad Católica	6	3	0	3	6	6	0	9	Round of 16	0–2	—	3–1	2–0
3	(Uruguay) Nacional	6	2	2	2	8	9	−1	8	Copa Sudamericana	2–0	1–0	—	4–4
4	(Colombia) Atlético Nacional	6	1	2	3	6	9	−3	5		0–2	2–0	0–0	—

Source: CONMEBOL
Rules for classification: 1) Points; 2) Goal difference; 3) Goals scored; 4) Away goals scored; 5) CONMEBOL ranking.

22 April 2021 1	Atlético Nacional (Colombia)	2–0	(Chile) Universidad Católica	Estadio Hernán Ramírez Villegas, Pereira (Note: Atlético Nacional played their home matches at Estadio Hernán Ramírez Villegas, Pereira instead of their regular stadium Estadio Atanasio Girardot, Medellín which temporarily underwent maintenance works ahead of the 2021 Copa América.)
19:00 UTC−5	Andrade 39'; Duque 45'	Report		Attendance: 0 Referee: Alexis Herrera (Venezuela)

29 April 2021 (Note: The Universidad Católica v Argentinos Juniors match, originally scheduled for 28 April 2021, 22:00 local time, was rescheduled to 29 April 2021, 18:00 local time.) 2	Universidad Católica (Chile)	0–2	(Argentina) Argentinos Juniors	Estadio San Carlos de Apoquindo, Santiago
18:00 UTC−4		Report	Florentín 23'; Hauche 51'	Attendance: 0 Referee: Gery Vargas (Bolivia)

5 May 2021 3	Universidad Católica (Chile)	3–1	(Uruguay) Nacional	Estadio San Carlos de Apoquindo, Santiago
22:00 UTC−4	Zampedri 30' (pen.); Valencia 59'; Montes 90+3'	Report	Fernández 45+1'	Attendance: 0 Referee: Anderson Daronco (Brazil)

12 May 2021 4	Argentinos Juniors (Argentina)	0–1	(Chile) Universidad Católica	Estadio Diego Armando Maradona, Buenos Aires
19:00 UTC−3		Report	Zampedri 74'	Attendance: 0 Referee: Wilton Sampaio (Brazil)

18 May 2021 5	Nacional (Uruguay)	1–0	(Chile) Universidad Católica	Estadio Gran Parque Central, Montevideo
19:15 UTC−3	Ocampo 29'	Report		Attendance: 0 Referee: Raphael Claus (Brazil)

26 May 2021 6	Universidad Católica (Chile)	2–0	(Colombia) Atlético Nacional	Estadio San Carlos de Apoquindo, Santiago
22:00 UTC−4	Aued 9'; Valencia 79'	Report		Attendance: 0 Referee: Wilton Sampaio (Brazil)

==== Knockout phase ====
===== Round of 16 =====
The draw for the round of 16 was held on 1 June 2021.

14 July 2021 First leg	Universidad Católica (Chile)	0–1	(Brazil) Palmeiras	Estadio San Carlos de Apoquindo, Santiago (Note: The Universidad Católica v Palmeiras match, originally scheduled at Estadio Nacional Julio Martínez Prádanos, Santiago, was rescheduled at Universidad Católica's regular stadium Estadio San Carlos de Apoquindo, Santiago.)
18:15 UTC−4		Report	Veiga 42' (pen.)	Attendance: 0 Referee: Andrés Matonte (Uruguay)

21 July 2021 Second leg	Palmeiras (Brazil)	1–0	(Chile) Universidad Católica	Allianz Parque, São Paulo
19:15 UTC−3	Rocha 36'	Report		Attendance: 0 Referee: Alexis Herrera (Venezuela)

== Statistics ==
=== Squad statistics ===
No.	Pos	Nat	Player	Total		League		Copa Chile		Supercopa de Chile		Copa Libertadores	
No.	Pos	Nat	Player	Apps	Goals	Apps	Goals	Apps	Goals	Apps	Goals	Apps	Goals
1	GK	(Argentina)	Matías Dituro †	12	0	7	0	0	0	0	0	5	0
2	DF	(Argentina)	Germán Lanaro	22	1	18	1	1	0	1	0	2	0
3	DF	(Chile)	Cristóbal Finch	2	0	1	0	1	0	0	0	0	0
4	DF	(Chile)	Carlos Salomón	8	1	4	0	4	1	0	0	0	0
5	DF	(Chile)	Valber Huerta	43	3	30	3	4	0	1	0	8	0
6	DF	(Chile)	Francisco Silva †	18	0	9	0	3	0	0	0	6	0
7	DF	(Chile)	Tomás Asta-Buruaga	33	1	24	1	3	0	1	0	5	0
8	MF	(Chile)	Ignacio Saavedra	39	0	28	0	2	0	1	0	8	0
9	FW	(Argentina)	Fernando Zampedri	41	27	29	23	4	1	1	1	7	2
10	MF	(Chile)	Edson Puch	27	1	22	1	0	0	0	0	5	0
11	MF	(Argentina)	Luciano Aued	27	1	16	0	4	0	1	0	6	1
13	MF	(Chile)	Felipe Gutiérrez	31	3	21	3	4	0	0	0	6	0
14	FW	(Chile)	Juan Fuentes	11	0	8	0	1	0	0	0	2	0
15	DF	(Argentina)	Gastón Lezcano	17	0	15	0	0	0	0	0	2	0
16	FW	(Chile)	Clemente Montes	17	2	12	1	0	0	1	0	4	1
17	DF	(Chile)	Branco Ampuero	12	0	8	0	0	0	1	0	3	0
18	MF	(Argentina)	Diego Buonanotte	27	3	19	2	4	1	1	0	3	0
19	DF	(Chile)	José Pedro Fuenzalida	34	3	24	3	4	0	0	0	6	0
20	FW	(Chile)	Gonzalo Tapia	5	0	3	0	0	0	0	0	2	0
21	DF	(Chile)	Raimundo Rebolledo	29	0	18	0	4	0	0	0	7	0
22	MF	(Chile)	Juan Leiva	39	1	26	1	4	0	1	0	8	0
23	MF	(Chile)	Juan Cornejo	18	1	10	1	3	0	0	0	5	0
24	DF	(Chile)	Alfonso Parot	38	4	29	3	2	1	1	0	6	0
25	GK	(Chile)	Sebastián Pérez	31	0	24	0	3	0	1	0	3	0
26	MF	(Chile)	Marcelino Núñez	36	6	28	6	0	0	1	0	7	0
27	FW	(Chile)	Alexander Aravena	1	0	1	0	0	0	0	0	0	0
28	FW	(Chile)	Vicente Bernedo	3	0	0	0	3	0	0	0	0	0
30	FW	(Chile)	Diego Valencia	42	17	31	14	2	1	1	0	8	2
32	FW	(Chile)	Fabián Orellana	7	0	7	0	0	0	0	0	0	0
32	FW	(Chile)	Benjamín Gómez	1	0	0	0	1	0	0	0	0	0
35	FW	(Chile)	Nicolás Sepúlveda	1	0	0	0	1	0	0	0	0	0

Last updated: 26 February 2022
Source: Soccerway

^{†} Player left Universidad Católica during the season

=== Goals ===
Rank	No.	Pos.	Nat.	Player	League	C. Chile	Supercopa	Copa Libertadores	Total
1	9	FW	(Argentina)	Fernando Zampedri	23	1	1	2	27
2	30	FW	(Chile)	Diego Valencia	14	1	0	2	17
3	26	MF	(Chile)	Marcelino Núñez	6	0	0	0	6
4	24	DF	(Chile)	Alfonso Parot	3	1	0	0	4
5	19	DF	(Chile)	José Pedro Fuenzalida	3	0	0	0	3
=	13	MF	(Chile)	Felipe Gutiérrez	3	0	0	0	3
=	18	MF	(Argentina)	Diego Buonanotte	2	1	0	0	3
=	5	DF	(Chile)	Valber Huerta	3	0	0	0	3
6	16	FW	(Chile)	Clemente Montes	1	0	0	1	2
7	10	FW	(Chile)	Edson Puch	1	0	0	0	1
=	11	MF	(Argentina)	Luciano Aued	0	0	0	1	1
=	7	DF	(Chile)	Tomás Asta-Buruaga	1	0	0	0	1
=	2	DF	(Argentina)	Germán Lanaro	1	0	0	0	1
=	23	DF	(Chile)	Juan Cornejo	1	0	0	0	1
=	4	DF	(Chile)	Carlos Salomón	0	1	0	0	1
=	22	MF	(Chile)	Juan Leiva	1	0	0	0	1
=				Own goal	2	0	0	0	2
Total					65	5	1	6	77

- Last updated: December 2021
- Source: Soccerway

=== Assists ===
Rank	No.	Pos.	Nat.	Player	League	Copa Chile	Supercopa	Copa Libertadores	Total
1	19	DF	(Chile)	José Pedro Fuenzalida	9	1	0	0	10
2	26	MF	(Chile)	Marcelino Núñez	7	0	0	2	9
3	13	MF	(Chile)	Felipe Gutiérrez	5	1	0	0	6
4	30	FW	(Chile)	Diego Valencia	3	1	0	1	5
5	9	FW	(Argentina)	Fernando Zampedri	4	0	0	0	4
5	18	MF	(Argentina)	Diego Buonanotte	4	0	0	0	4
5	10	FW	(Chile)	Edson Puch	4	0	0	0	4
5	11	MF	(Argentina)	Luciano Aued	3	1	0	0	4
9	24	DF	(Chile)	Alfonso Parot	2	0	0	0	2
9	7	DF	(Chile)	Tomás Asta-Buruaga	1	1	0	0	2
11	16	DF	(Chile)	Clemente Montes	0	0	0	1	1
11	13	DF	(Chile)	Germán Lanaro	1	0	0	0	1
11	32	FW	(Chile)	Fabián Orellana	1	0	0	0	1
Total					44	5	0	4	53

- Last updated: December 2021
- Source: Soccerway

=== Clean sheets ===
Rank	No.	Pos.	Nat.	Name	League	C. Chile	Supercopa	Copa Libertadores	Total
1	25	GK	(Chile)	Sebastián Pérez	10	1	0	1	12
2	1	GK	(Argentina)	Matías Dituro	3	0	0	1	4
Total					13	1	0	2	16

- Last updated: December 2021
- Source: Soccerway

=== Disciplinary record ===
N	P	Nat.	Name	League			Copa Chile			Supercopa			Copa Libertadores			Total		
N	P	Nat.	Name	Yellow card	Second yellow card	Red card	Yellow card	Second yellow card	Red card	Yellow card	Second yellow card	Red card	Yellow card	Second yellow card	Red card	Yellow card	Second yellow card	Red card
14	MF	(Chile)	Juan Fuentes	1					1				1			2		1
16	FW	(Chile)	Clemente Montes			1							1			1		1
2	DF	(Argentina)	Germán Lanaro			1							1			1		1
9	FW	(Argentina)	Fernando Zampedri	1	1		1			1			5			17	1	
3	FW	(Chile)	Diego Valencia	4	1		1			1			1			7	1	
22	MF	(Chile)	Juan Leiva	4			1			1	1		1			7	1	
1	FW	(Chile)	Edson Puch	4									1	1		5	1	
8	MF	(Chile)	Ignacio Saavedra	8			1						2			11		
26	MF	(Chile)	Marcelino Núñez	7									3			10		
6	DF	(Chile)	Valber Huerta	6									1			7		
24	DF	(Chile)	Alfonso Parot	4			1						1			6		
21	DF	(Chile)	Raimundo Rebolledo	3									2			5		
7	DF	(Chile)	Tomás Asta-Buruaga	3									2			5		
13	MF	(Chile)	Felipe Gutiérrez	3												4		
25	GK	(Chile)	Sebastián Pérez	3									1			4		
19	DF	(Chile)	José Pedro Fuenzalida	2												2		
6	MF	(Chile)	Francisco Silva	1									1			2		
11	MF	(Argentina)	Luciano Aued													1		
18	MF	(Argentina)	Diego Buonanotte	1			1									1		
19	DF	(Chile)	Gonzalo Tapia	1												1		
23	DF	(Chile)	Juan Cornejo	1												1		
Total				54	2	2	7		1	3	1		22	1		86	4	3

- Last updated: December 2021
- Source: Soccerway
