= Carlos Salomón =

Chilean footballer (born 2000)

Personal information
- Full name: Carlos Antonio Salomón Tapia
- Date of birth: 28 March 2000 (age 26)
- Place of birth: Recoleta, Santiago, Chile
- Height: 1.84 m (6 ft 0 in)
- Position: Centre-back

Team information
- Current team: Ñublense

Youth career
- 2014–2020: Universidad Católica

Senior career*
Years	Team	Apps	(Gls)
2020–2024	Universidad Católica	11	(0)
2022	→ Santiago Morning (loan)	22	(0)
2023	→ Deportes Santa Cruz (loan)	4	(0)
2024	→ Barnechea (loan)	22	(1)
2025	Deportes Copiapó	29	(1)
2026–	Ñublense	0	(0)

International career^{‡}
2017	Chile U17	0	(0)
- * Club domestic league appearances and goals as of 20 December 2025 ‡ National team caps and goals as of 30 May 2019

Carlos Antonio Salomón Tapia (born 28 March 2000) is a Chilean professional footballer who plays as a centre-back for Ñublense.

== Career ==
Salomón debuted with Universidad Católica the year 2020 in the match against Everton in Estadio Sausalito. In 2024, he was loaned out to Barnechea, after his stints with Santiago Morning and Deportes Santa Cruz in 2022 and 2023, respectively.

Salomón ended his contract with Universidad Católica in 2024. The next year, he joined Deportes Copiapó.

On 19 December 2025, Salomón signed with Ñublense.

== Career statistics ==
=== Club ===
As of 1 March 2022

Club	Season	League			National Cup		Continental		Other		Total	
Club	Season	Division	Apps	Goals	Apps	Goals	Apps	Goals	Apps	Goals	Apps	Goals
Universidad Católica	2020	Primera División	7	0	—		—		1 (Note: Appearance(s) in the Supercopa de Chile)	0	8	0
Universidad Católica	2021	Primera División	4	0	4	1	—		—		8	1
Universidad Católica	Total club		11	0	5	1	0	0	0	0	16	1
Santiago Morning (loan)	2022	Primera B	0	0	—		—		—		0	0
Total carrera			11	0	4	1	0	0	1	0	16	1

== Honours ==
Universidad Católica

- Primera División de Chile: 2020, 2021
- Supercopa de Chile: 2020, 2021
