= Cristóbal Finch =

Chilean footballer (born 2002)

Personal information
- Full name: Cristóbal Ignacio Finch Barrios
- Date of birth: 1 June 2002 (age 24)
- Place of birth: Providencia, Santiago, Chile
- Height: 1.82 m (6 ft 0 in)
- Position: Centre-back

Team information
- Current team: Atlético Colina
- Number: 3

Youth career
- Universidad Católica

Senior career*
Years	Team	Apps	(Gls)
2021–2023	Universidad Católica	1	(0)
2023	→ Barnechea (loan)	8	(0)
2024	Omladinac GV	–	(–)
2025–	Atlético Colina	–	(–)
- * Club domestic league appearances and goals as of 31 December 2025

Cristóbal Ignacio Finch Barrios (born 1 June 2002) is a Chilean professional footballer who plays as a centre back for Atlético Colina in the Segunda División Profesional de Chile.

== Career ==
Finch made his professional debut playing for Universidad Catolica in a 2021 Copa Chile match against Everton de Viña del Mar on 3 July 2021. In 2023, he was loaned out to Barnechea in the Primera B.

A free agent during the first half of 2024, Finch moved to Croatia and joined NK Omladinac Gornja Vrba in July of the same year.

Back to Chile, Finch joined Atlético Colina and won the 2025 Tercera A.

== Career statistics ==
=== Club ===
As of 13 November 2021

Club	Season	League			National Cup		Continental		Other		Total	
Club	Season	Division	Apps	Goals	Apps	Goals	Apps	Goals	Apps	Goals	Apps	Goals
Universidad Católica	2021	C. Primera División	1	0	1	0	—		—		2	0
Universidad Católica	2022	C. Primera División	0	0	0	0	0	0	0	0	0	0
Universidad Católica	Total club		1	0	1	0	0	0	0	0	2	0
Career total			1	0	1	0	0	0	0	0	2	0

== Honours ==
Universidad Católica

- Chilean Primera División: 2020, 2021
- Supercopa de Chile: 2020, 2021

Atlético Colina

- Chilean Tercera A: 2025
