= Gonzalo Tapia =

Chilean footballer (born 2002)

Personal information
- Full name: Gonzalo Andrés Tapia Dubournais
- Date of birth: 18 February 2002 (age 24)
- Place of birth: Recoleta, Chile
- Height: 1.78 m (5 ft 10 in)
- Position: Forward

Team information
- Current team: Columbus Crew (on loan from São Paulo)
- Number: 33

Youth career
- 2014–2020: Universidad Católica

Senior career*
Years	Team	Apps	(Gls)
2020–2024	Universidad Católica	94	(17)
2025	River Plate	6	(0)
2025	→ São Paulo (loan)	20	(5)
2026–	São Paulo	20	(2)
2026–	→ Columbus Crew (loan)	11	(6)

International career^{‡}
2017	Chile U15		
2017–2019	Chile U17	13	(4)
2020	Chile U20	3	(3)
2022–2024	Chile U23	4	(1)
2024–	Chile	15	(3)
- * Club domestic league appearances and goals as of 8 November 2026 ‡ National team caps and goals as of 6 October 2026

Gonzalo Andrés Tapia Dubournais (born 18 February 2002) is a Chilean professional footballer who plays as a forward for Major League Soccer club Columbus Crew on loan from Campeonato Brasileiro Série A club São Paulo and the Chile national team.

== Club career ==
Tapia joined the Universidad Católica academy at the age of 10, quickly standing out in the club's youth system. He won the under-15 championship with the club in 2016 and was also named the top scorer and best player in both the under-14 and under-15 categories.

In October 2019, he signed his first professional contract, keeping him with Universidad Católica through June 2022. He was promoted to the first team for the 2020 season, and was included in the club's 30-man squad for the 2020 Copa Libertadores. He made his official first-team debut on 5 September 2020, replacing Edson Puch in the 86th minute of Universidad Católica's 4–1 victory over Coquimbo Unido. He scored his first professional goal on 19 January 2021, in a 1–1 draw against Everton de Viña del Mar. In February 2021, he celebrated his first domestic title after Universidad Católica won the 2020 Chilean Primera División. The following month, he helped the club win the 2020 Supercopa de Chile with a 4–2 victory over Colo Colo, scoring the first brace of his professional career.

At the start of the 2021 season, Tapia suffered a right hamstring injury on 28 March during Universidad Católica's league opener against Ñublense. He returned to action on 16 April against Curicó Unido and made his Copa Libertadores debut six days later in a 2–0 loss to Atlético Nacional. He came on in the 54th minute but was forced off after just 16 minutes with another hamstring injury, leaving Universidad Católica to finish the match with ten players. After being medically cleared, Tapia returned on July 15, 2021, in the first leg of the Copa Libertadores Round of 16 against Palmeiras, a 1–0 home defeat. Three days later, after coming on in the 74th minute against Colo Colo in league play, he suffered another setback when the injury recurred. Further examinations revealed a ruptured hamstring tendon, requiring surgery and ruling him out for the remainder of the season. At the end of the year, Universidad Católica won the Chilean Primera División championship, giving Tapia three titles across two seasons with Los Cruzados.

In 2025, Tapia moved to Argentina and signed with River Plate, making just seven total appearances across all competitions in his brief time in Argentina. On 18 July 2025, Tapia joined Brazilian club São Paulo on a one-season loan with an option to buy.

On 5 August 2026, Major League Soccer (MLS) side Columbus Crew acquired Tapia from São Paulo via loan through the 2027 MLS Sprint Season, which includes a club option for a permanent transfer. Tapia made his club debut on 26 August as a substitute in a 2–0 loss to Club America in the Leagues Cup quarterfinals. On 5 September, Tapia came on as a substitute in the 75th minute and scored and assisted in a 3–0 home win over the Colorado Rapids. His goal, scored via a trivela, was voted Goal of the Matchday. In October, Tapia began a three-match scoring streak in league play, finding the net in consecutive victories against FC Cincinnati on 18 October, Toronto FC on 24 October, and FC Dallas on 28 October.

== International career ==
At early age, he represented Chile at under-15 level in the 2017 South American U-15 Championship and Chile U17 at the 2019 South American U-17 Championship and at the 2019 FIFA U-17 World Cup. In addition, he represented Chile U20 in a friendly tournament played in Teresópolis (Brazil) called Granja Comary International Tournament, scoring in all matches against Peru U20, Bolivia U20, and Brazil U20.

Later, he was called up to the first training microcycle of the Chile senior team on 2021.

He represented Chile at under-23 level in a 1–0 win against Peru U23 on 31 August 2022, in the context of preparations for the 2023 Pan American Games. In 2024, he took part in the Pre-Olympic Tournament.

Tapia made his debut for the senior Chile national team on 10 September 2024 in a World Cup qualifier against Bolivia at the Estadio Nacional Julio Martínez Prádanos. He substituted Darío Osorio in the 61st minute as Bolivia won 2–1.

== Career statistics ==
=== Club ===
As of 19 September 2026

Appearances and goals by club, season and competition
Club	Season	League			State league (Note: Including Campeonato Paulista)		National cup		Continental		Other		Total	
Club	Season	Division	Apps	Goals	Apps	Goals	Apps	Goals	Apps	Goals	Apps	Goals	Apps	Goals
Universidad Católica	2020	Liga de Primera	11	2	—		—		—		1 (Note: Appearance(s) in the Supercopa de Chile)	2	12	4
Universidad Católica	2021	Liga de Primera	3	0	—		—		2 (Note: Appearance(s) in the Copa Libertadores)	0	—		5	0
Universidad Católica	2022	Liga de Primera	26	2	—		5	1	6 (Note: 4 appearances in Copa Libertadores, 2 in Copa Sudamericana)	0	1	0	38	3
Universidad Católica	2023	Liga de Primera	25	4	—		3	0	1 (Note: Appearance(s) in the Copa Sudamericana)	2	0	0	29	4
Universidad Católica	2024	Liga de Primera	29	9	—		3	2	1	0	0	0	33	11
Universidad Católica	Total		94	17	—		11	3	10	0	2	2	117	22
River Plate	2025	AFA Liga Profesional de Fútbol	6	0	—		1	0	0	0	0	0	7	0
São Paulo (loan)	2025	Série A	20	5	—		1	0	0	0	—		21	5
São Paulo	2026	Série A	11	0	9	2	1	1	6	0	0	0	27	3
Columbus Crew (loan)	2026	MLS	11	6	—		2	0	—		1 (Note: Appearance in Leagues Cup)	0	14	6
Career total			136	23	9	2	15	4	16	0	3	2	186	36

=== International ===
As of match played 6 October 2026

Appearances and goals by national team and year
National team	Year	Apps	Goals
Chile	2024	3	0
Chile	2025	5	1
Chile	2026	7	2
Total		15	3

List of international goals scored by Gonzalo Tapia
No.	Date	Venue	Opponent	Score	Result	Competition
1.	15 November 2025	Fisht Olympic Stadium, Sochi, Russia	Russia	1–0	2–0	Friendly
2.	27 March 2026	Eden Park, Auckland, New Zealand	Cape Verde	4–2	4–2	2026 FIFA Series
3.	30 March 2026	Eden Park, Auckland, New Zealand	New Zealand	1–4	1–4	2026 FIFA Series

== Honours ==
Universidad Católica

- Primera División: 2020, 2021
- Supercopa de Chile: 2020, 2021
