= Tomás Asta-Buruaga =

Chilean footballer (born 1996)

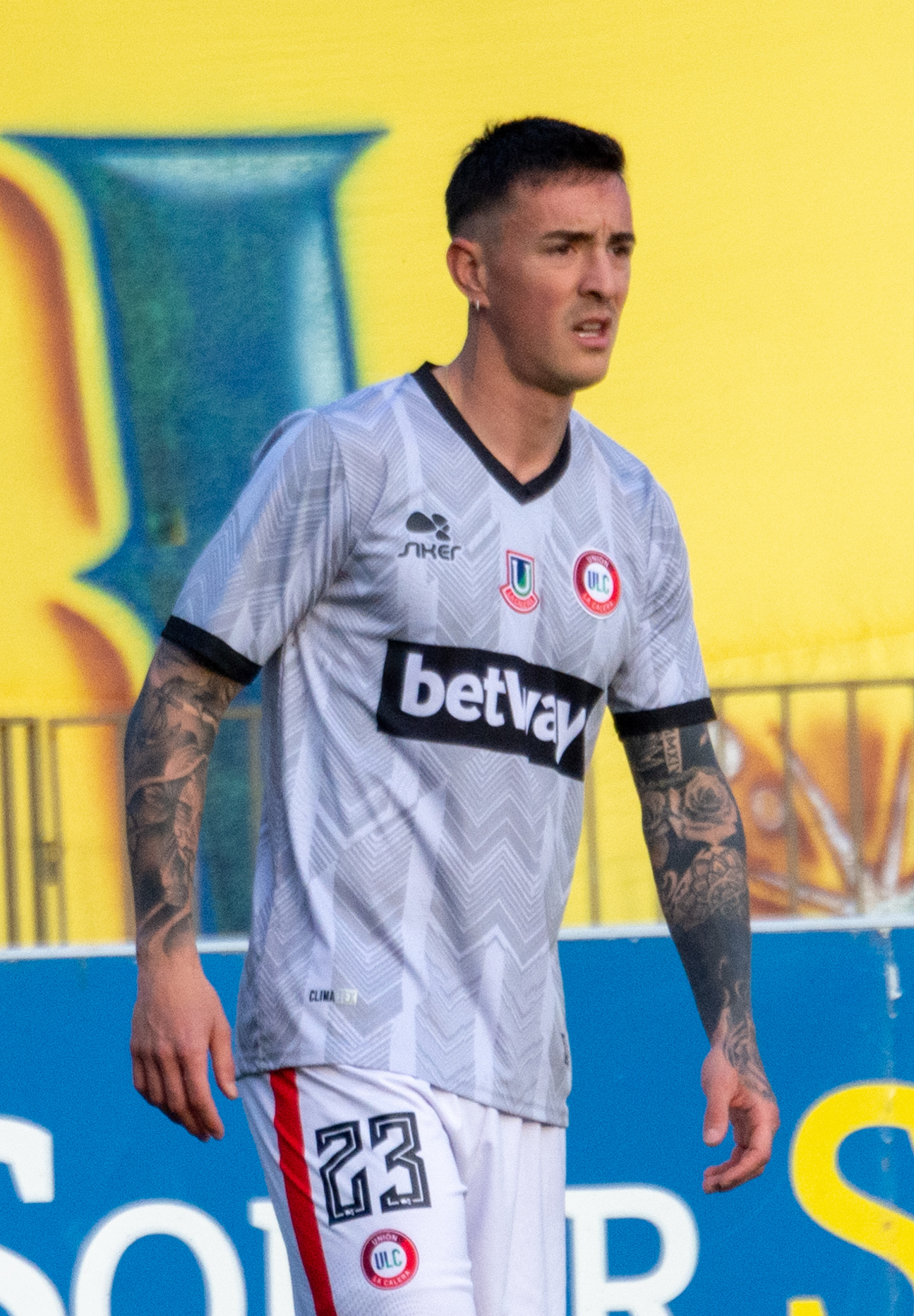
- Asta-Buruaga with Unión La Calera in 2023

Personal information
- Full name: Tomás Pablo Asta-Buruaga Montoya
- Date of birth: 11 October 1996 (age 30)
- Place of birth: Santiago, Chile
- Height: 1.85 m (6 ft 1 in)
- Position: Centre-back

Team information
- Current team: Universidad Católica
- Number: 23

Youth career
- Universidad Católica
- Unión Española

Senior career*
| Years | Team | Apps | (Gls) |
| 2012–2014 | Unión Española B | 23 | (0) |
| 2013–2017 | Unión Española | 2 | (0) |
| 2016–2017 | → Deportes Antofagasta (loan) | 3 | (1) |
| 2017–2021 | Deportes Antofagasta | 64 | (1) |
| 2020–2021 | → Universidad Católica (loan) | 9 | (1) |
| 2021– | Universidad Católica | 72 | (3) |
| 2023 | → Unión La Calera (loan) | 28 | (1) |
| 2024 | → Everton (loan) | 27 | (3) |

International career
| 2014 | Chile U20 | | |
- * Club domestic league appearances and goals as of 1 January 2026

Tomás Pablo Asta-Buruaga Montoya (born 11 October 1996) is a Chilean footballer who plays as a central defender for Universidad Católica.

== Club career ==
=== Unión Española ===
Born in Santiago, Asta-Buruaga was a Unión Española youth graduate. On 29 July 2012, aged just 15, he made his senior debut for the reserve team by playing the full 90 minutes in a 1–0 Segunda División Profesional de Chile away loss against Deportes Iberia.

Asta-Buruaga made his first team debut on 23 July 2013, starting in a 3–0 Copa Chile home win against Palestino. A regular figure for the B-team in the following campaigns, he made his Primera División debut on 22 February 2014, starting in a 3–1 home defeat to Everton de Viña del Mar.

=== Deportes Antofagasta ===
For the 2016–17 season, Asta-Buruaga was loaned to fellow top-tier club Deportes Antofagasta. Rarely used, he scored his first goal 20 November 2016, netting his team's only in a 5–1 loss at Universidad Católica.

Bought outright in mid-2017, Asta-Buruaga subsequently became a regular starter for the side.

=== Universidad Católica ===
Asta-Buruaga joined Universidad Católica in 2020 and left them at the end of the 2025 season. He made 100 appearances, scored three goals and made four assists in total. However, he renewed with them on 13 January 2026.

==== Everton (loan) ====
In 2024, he joined Everton de Viña del Mar on loan from Universidad Católica.

== International career ==
In 2014, Asta-Buruaga represented Chile U20 at the Four Nations International Tournament in Chile.

== Career statistics ==
As of match played 7 March 2026

| Club | Season | League | | | National cup (Note: Includes Copa Chile) | | League cup (Note: Includes Copa de la Liga) | | Continental | | Other | | Total | |
| Club | Season | Division | Apps | Goals | Apps | Goals | Apps | Goals | Apps | Goals | Apps | Goals | Apps | Goals |
|---|---|---|---|---|---|---|---|---|---|---|---|---|---|---|
| Unión Española B | 2012 | Segunda División Chile | 1 | 0 | — | | — | | — | | — | | 1 | 0 |
| Unión Española B | 2013 | Segunda División Chile | 10 | 0 | — | | — | | — | | — | | 10 | 0 |
| Unión Española B | 2013–14 | Segunda División Chile | 12 | 0 | — | | — | | — | | — | | 12 | 0 |
| Unión Española B | Subtotal | | 23 | 0 | — | | — | | — | | — | | 23 | 0 |
| Unión Española | 2013–14 | Primera División | 2 | 0 | 1 | 0 | — | | 0 | 0 | 0 | 0 | 3 | 0 |
| Unión Española | 2014–15 | Primera División | 0 | 0 | 0 | 0 | — | | — | | — | | 0 | 0 |
| Unión Española | 2015–16 | Primera División | 0 | 0 | 0 | 0 | — | | — | | — | | 0 | 0 |
| Unión Española | Subtotal | | 2 | 0 | 1 | 0 | 0 | 0 | — | | 0 | 0 | 3 | 0 |
| Deportes Antofagasta (loan) | 2016-17 | Primera División | 3 | 1 | 0 | 0 | — | | — | | — | | 3 | 1 |
| Deportes Antofagasta | 2017 | Primera División | 14 | 1 | 7 | 0 | — | | — | | — | | 21 | 1 |
| Deportes Antofagasta | 2018 | Primera División | 28 | 0 | 1 | 0 | — | | — | | — | | 29 | 0 |
| Deportes Antofagasta | 2019 | Primera División | 22 | 0 | 2 | 0 | — | | 2 | 0 | 0 | 0 | 26 | 0 |
| Deportes Antofagasta | Subtotal | | 64 | 1 | 10 | 0 | — | | 2 | 0 | — | | 76 | 1 |
| Universidad Católica (loan) | 2020 | Primera División | 9 | 1 | — | | — | | 5 (Note: 2 appearances in the Copa Libertadores, 3 in the Copa Sudamericana) | 0 | — | | 14 | 1 |
| Universidad Católica | 2021 | Primera División | 24 | 1 | 3 | 0 | — | | 5 (Note: Appearance(s) in the Copa Libertadores) | 0 | 1 (Note: Appearance(s) in the Supercopa de Chile) | 0 | 33 | 1 |
| Universidad Católica | 2022 | Primera División | 17 | 0 | 2 | 0 | — | | 7 (Note: 5 appearances in Copa Libertadores, 2 in Copa Sudamericana) | 0 | — | | 26 | 0 |
| Universidad Católica | 2025 | Primera División | 22 | 1 | 4 | 0 | — | | 1 (Note: Appearance in Copa Sudamericana) | 0 | — | | 27 | 1 |
| Universidad Católica | 2026 | Primera División | 6 | 0 | 0 | 0 | 0 | 0 | 0 | 0 | 2 | 0 | 8 | 0 |
| Universidad Católica | Total club | | 69 | 2 | 9 | 0 | — | | 13 | 0 | 3 | 0 | 94 | 2 |
| Unión La Calera (loan) | 2016-17 | Primera División | 28 | 1 | 2 | 0 | — | | — | | — | | 30 | 1 |
| Everton (loan) | 2016-17 | Primera División | 27 | 3 | 5 | 0 | — | | 1 | 0 | — | | 33 | 3 |
| Total | | | 225 | 9 | 28 | 0 | — | | 21 | 0 | 2 | 0 | 276 | 9 |

== Honours ==
Unión Española

- Supercopa de Chile: 2013

Universidad Católica

- Primera División de Chile: 2020, 2021
- Supercopa de Chile: 2020, 2021
