= Fernando Zampedri =

Chilean footballer

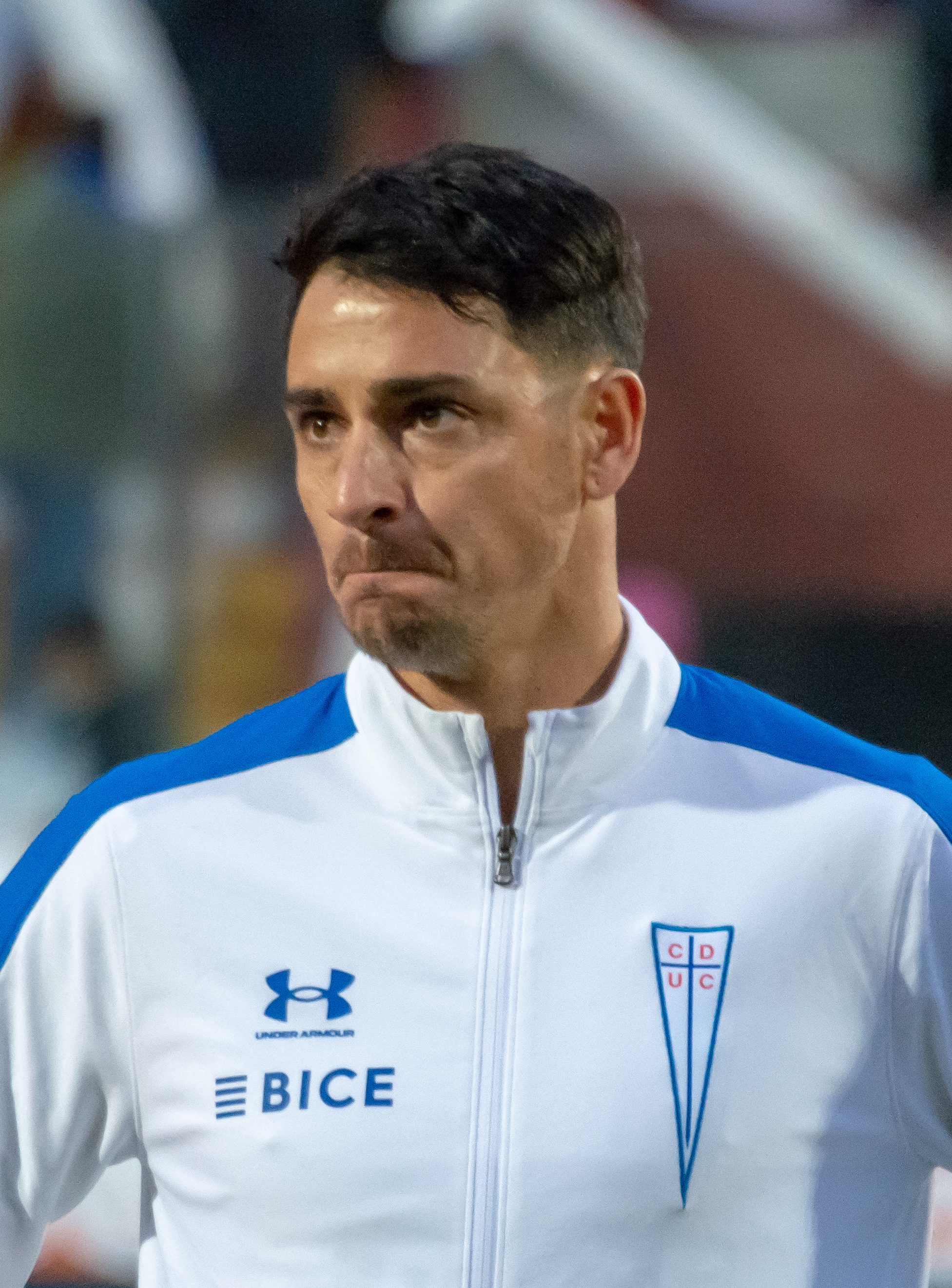
- Zampedri with Universidad Católica in 2023

Personal information
- Full name: Fernando Matías Zampedri
- Date of birth: 14 February 1988 (age 38)
- Place of birth: Chajarí, Argentina
- Height: 1.85 m (6 ft 1 in)
- Position: Forward

Team information
- Current team: Universidad Católica
- Number: 9

Youth career
- 1993–1998: 1° de Mayo
- 2001: Newell's Old Boys
- Atlético Rafaela

Senior career*
Years	Team	Apps	(Gls)
2008–2013	Atlético Rafaela	47	(8)
2010–2011	→ Sportivo Belgrano (loan)	21	(10)
2011–2012	→ Crucero del Norte (loan)	18	(3)
2012–2013	→ Sportivo Belgrano (loan)	26	(4)
2013–2014	Guillermo Brown	32	(22)
2014–2015	Boca Unidos	4	(0)
2015	Juventud Unida	38	(25)
2016–2017	Atlético Tucumán	34	(14)
2017–2020	Rosario Central	45	(11)
2020	→ Universidad Católica (loan)	32	(20)
2021–	Universidad Católica	165	(122)

International career^{‡}
2025	Chile	2	(0)
- * Club domestic league appearances and goals as of 8 November 2026 ‡ National team caps and goals as of 25 March 2025

Fernando Matías Zampedri (born 14 February 1988) is a professional footballer who plays for Universidad Católica. He is the team captain and the club's all-time leading goal scorer. Born in Argentina, he plays for the Chile national team.

At the conclusion of the 2025 Liga de Primera season, he became a six-time top scorer in Chilean football, making him the second active player in the world to achieve this record, alongside Kylian Mbappé.

== Club career ==
Born in Chajarí, Argentina, Zampedri was with club 1° de Mayo in his hometown as a youth player. Later, he spent one year with Newell's Old Boys, aged 13, before joining Atlético Rafaela, with whom he made his professional debut in 2008. Subsequently, he played on loan for Sportivo Belgrano and Crucero del Norte in the Torneo Argentino A. In 2013, he signed with Guillermo Brown in the same division.

From 2014 to 2015, Zampedri played in the Primera Nacional for Boca Unidos and Juventud Unida de Gualeguaychú. From 2016 to 2019, he played in the Argentine Primera División for Atlético Tucumán and Rosario Central.

=== Universidad Católica ===
After leaving Rosario Central, he joined Universidad Católica on loan for a fee of US$150,000, with an option to buy for US$1.5 million in June 2020 or US$2 million at the end of the season. In December 2020, Universidad Católica finalized the permanent transfer, acquiring 100% of his rights for approximately US$1.5 million, with a contract running through December 2023. Following the 2020 season, Zampedri emerged as the Chilean league's top scorer, a distinction he retained in 2021 and 2022. That same year, he also secured the top scorer title in the Copa Chile.

In October 2023, Zampedri reached an agreement with Universidad Católica to extend his contract through December 2025. During that season, he scored 17 goals, becoming the first player in Chilean football history to finish as the league's top scorer for a fourth consecutive time. On April 13, 2024, he equaled Néstor Isella’s 105-goal tally, becoming the club’s joint-top foreign scorer. Later, on October 19, 2024, in the Clásico Universitario against Universidad de Chile, he scored his 119th goal to become Universidad Católica’s outright all-time leading scorer. That same year, he also clinched his fifth consecutive Chilean league top scorer title.

On August 23, 2025, during the inaugural match at the Claro Arena against Unión Española, Zampedri became the first player to score in the reopened stadium. As the season drew to a close, he extended his contract with Universidad Católica for two more years, and received two commemorative plaques for scoring the final goal at Estadio San Carlos de Apoquindo and the first at Claro Arena. By the end of the 2025 season, he joined Esteban Paredes as the only players to win the Chilean top-flight scoring title six times, achieving this feat consecutively in long-format tournaments.

== International career ==
A naturalized Chilean since February 2025, Zampedri was called up to the Chile national team under Ricardo Gareca for the 2026 FIFA World Cup qualifiers against Paraguay and Ecuador on 20 and 25 March 2025, respectively. He made his debut in the first match by replacing Eduardo Vargas at minute 70.

== Personal life ==
Zampedri naturalized Chilean by residence. He received his certificate of naturalization on 19 February 2025.

== Career statistics ==
=== Club ===
As of As of match played 8 November 2026

Appearances and goals by club, season and competition
Club	Season	League			National cup (Note: Includes Copa Argentina, Copa Chile)		League cup (Note: Includes Copa de la Liga)		Continental		Other		Total	
Club	Season	Division	Apps	Goals	Apps	Goals	Apps	Goals	Apps	Goals	Apps	Goals	Apps	Goals
Atlético Rafaela	2008-09	Primera Nacional	13	4	—		—		—		—		13	4
Atlético Rafaela	2009-10	Primera Nacional	34	3	—		—		—		—		34	3
Atlético Rafaela	Total		47	7	—		—		—		—		47	7
Sportivo Belgrano	2010-11	Torneo Argentino A	21	10	—		—		—		—		21	10
Crucero del Norte	2011-12	Torneo Argentino A	18	3	—		—		—		—		18	3
Sportivo Belgrano	2012-13	Torneo Argentino A	26	4	2	0	—		—		—		28	4
Guillermo Brown	2013-14	Torneo Argentino A	32	22	—		—		—		—		32	22
Boca Unidos	2014	Primera Nacional	4	0	—		—		—		—		4	0
Juventud Unida	2015	Primera Nacional	38	25	—		—		—		—		38	25
Atlético Tucumán	2016	Primera División	12	3	1	0	—		—		—		13	3
Atlético Tucumán	2016-17	Primera División	22	11	—		—		10 (Note: 9 appearances in the Copa Libertadores, 1 in the Copa Sudamericana)	6	—		32	17
Atlético Tucumán	Total		34	14	1	0	—		10	6	—		45	20
Rosario Central	2017-18	Primera División	24	7	4	2	—		2 (Note: Appearances in Copa Sudamericana)	0	—		30	9
Rosario Central	2018-19	Primera División	21	4	7	4	—		4 (Note: Appearance(s) in the Copa Libertadores)	1	1 (Note: Appearance(s) in the Supercopa Argentina)	0	33	9
Rosario Central	Total		45	11	11	6	—		6	1	1	0	63	18
Universidad Católica (loan)	2019	Primera División	—		1	0	—		—		—		1	0
Universidad Católica (loan)	2020	Primera División	32	20	—		—		11 (Note: 6 appearances in the Copa Libertadores, 5 in the Copa Sudamericana)	7	1 (Note: Appearance(s) in the Supercopa de Chile)	1	44	28
Universidad Católica	2021	Primera División	29	23	4	1	—		7	2	1	1	41	27
Universidad Católica	2022	Primera División	29	18	6	6	—		8 (Note: 6 appearances in Copa Libertadores, 2 in Copa Sudamericana)	3	1	0	44	27
Universidad Católica	2023	Primera División	28	17	5	1	—		1	2	—		34	20
Universidad Católica	2024	Primera División	28	19	1	0	—		1	0	—		30	19
Universidad Católica	2025	Primera División	25	16	5	1	—		1	1	—		31	18
Universidad Católica	2026	Primera División	26	29	7	3	4	1	7	4	2	2	46	39
Universidad Católica	U.Católica total		197	142	29	12	4	1	36	19	5	4	271	178
Career total			462	238	43	18	4	1	52	26	6	4	567	287

=== International ===
As of match played 25 March 2025

Appearances and goals by national team and year
National team	Year	Apps	Goals
Chile	2025	2	0
Total		2	0

== Honours ==
Rosario Central

- Copa Argentina: 2017–18

Universidad Católica

- Primera División de Chile: 2020, 2021
- Supercopa de Chile: 2020, 2021

Individual

- Top goalscorer Primera División de Chile: 2020, 2021, 2022, 2023, 2024, 2025.
- Top goalscorer Copa Chile: 2022
- Chilean Primera División Ideal Team: 2024, 2025
- Chilean Primera División Crack Player: 2024
- Chilean Primera División Best Goal: 2024
