= Sebastián Pérez (footballer, born 1990) =

Chilean footballer

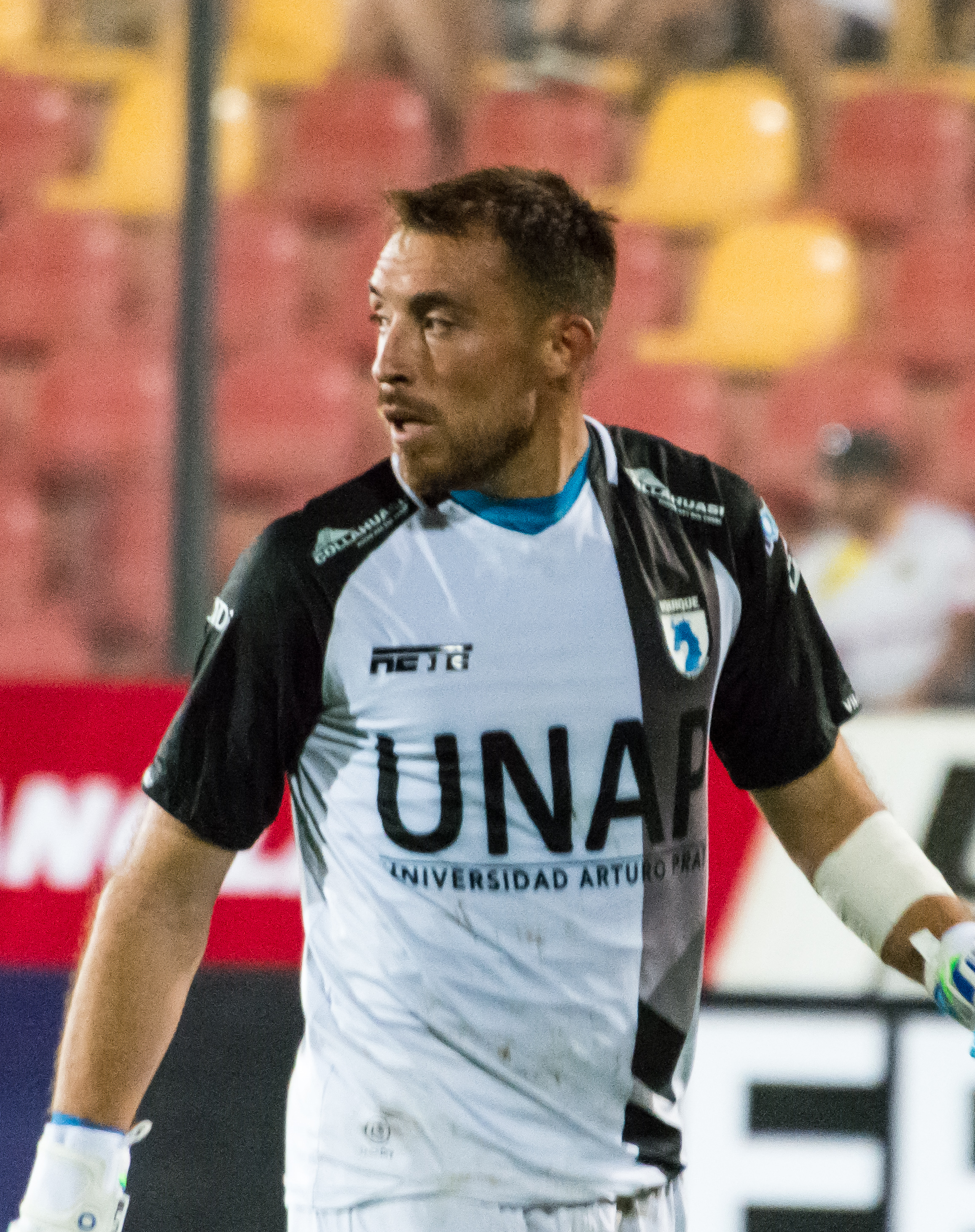
- Pérez with Deportes Iquique in 2020

Personal information
- Full name: Sebastián Andrés Pérez Kirby
- Date of birth: 2 December 1990 (age 35)
- Place of birth: Viña del Mar, Chile
- Height: 1.80 m (5 ft 11 in)
- Position: Goalkeeper

Team information
- Current team: Palestino

Youth career
- Everton

Senior career*
Years	Team	Apps	(Gls)
2008–2017	Everton	9	(0)
2011	→ Deportes Melipilla (loan)	–	(–)
2012–2014	→ Deportes Puerto Montt (loan)	59	(0)
2014–2016	→ Deportes Puerto Montt (loan)	67	(0)
2018	Palestino	26	(0)
2019–2020	Deportes Iquique	59	(0)
2021–2024	Universidad Católica	49	(0)
2023	→ Unión Española (loan)	23	(0)
2025–	Palestino	0	(0)

International career^{‡}
2021–	Chile	2	(0)
- * Club domestic league appearances and goals as of 11 December 2024 ‡ National team caps and goals as of 29 January 2022

Sebastián Andrés Pérez Kirby (born 2 December 1990) is a Chilean footballer who currently plays as a goalkeeper for Chilean club Palestino.

== Club career ==
Pérez made his professional debut playing for Everton de Viña del Mar in a Primera División match against Cobreloa by replacing Gustavo Dalsasso. Later, he was loaned to Tercera A club Deportes Melipilla and twice to Deportes Puerto Montt at the Primera B and Segunda División. After having no chances to play for Everton, on 2018 season he joined Palestino.

On 2019 season, he joined Deportes Iquique.

Pérez rejoined Palestino for the 2025 season after ending his contract with Universidad Católica.

== International career ==
Pérez was part of a Chile under-25 squad in a training session led by Claudio Borghi in May 2011, alongside his teammates in Everton, José Luis Muñoz and Mirko Opazo.

Pérez made his debut for the Chile national team on 9 December 2021 in a 2–2 draw against Mexico.

== Personal life ==
He is nicknamed Zanahoria (Carrot) due to his hair color.

From his maternal line, Pérez is of Irish descent.

== Career statistics ==
=== Club ===
As of 30 June 2022

Club	Season	League			National Cup		Continental		Other		Total	
Club	Season	Division	Apps	Goals	Apps	Goals	Apps	Goals	Apps	Goals	Apps	Goals
Everton	2010	Primera División	8	0	1	0	—		—		9	0
Melipilla (loan)	2011	Segunda División	—		—		—		—		0	0
Puerto Montt	2012	Primera B	19	0	1	0	—		—		20	0
Puerto Montt	2013	Segunda División	18	0	—		—		—		18	0
Puerto Montt	2013-14	Segunda División	22	0	—		—		—		22	0
Puerto Montt	2014-15	Segunda División	31	0	—		—		—		31	0
Puerto Montt	2015-16	Segunda División	36	0	5	0	—		—		41	0
Puerto Montt	Total club		126	0	6	0	0	0	0	0	132	0
Everton	2016-17	Primera División	1	0	7	0	—		—		8	0
Everton	2017	Primera División	—		—		—		—		0	0
Everton	Total club		1	0	7	0	0	0	0	0	8	0
Palestino	2018	Primera División	26	0	10	0	—		—		36	0
Deportes Iquique	2019	Primera División	25	0	1	0	—		—		26	0
Deportes Iquique	2020	Primera División	34	0	—		—		—		34	0
Deportes Iquique	Total club		59	0	1	0	0	0	0	0	60	0
Universidad Católica	2021	Primera División	25	0	3	0	3 (Note: Appearance(s) in the Copa Libertadores)	0	1 (Note: Appearance(s) in the Supercopa de Chile)	0	32	0
Universidad Católica	2022	Primera División	14	0	0	0	7 (Note: 6 appearances in Copa Libertadores, 1 in Copa Sudamericana)	0	1	0	22	0
Universidad Católica	Total club		39	0	3	0	10	0	2	0	54	0
Total			259	0	28	0	10	0	2	0	299	0

=== International ===
As of 14 June 2022

Appearances and goals by national team and year
National team	Year	Apps	Goals
Chile	2021	1	0
Chile	2022	2	0
Total		2	0

== Honours ==
Deportes Puerto Montt

- Segunda División: 2014-15

Palestino

- Copa Chile: 2018

Universidad Católica

- Chilean Primera División: 2021
- Supercopa de Chile: 2020, 2021

Individual

- Chilean Primera División Best Save: 2025
