= Alfonso Parot =

Chilean footballer (born 1989)

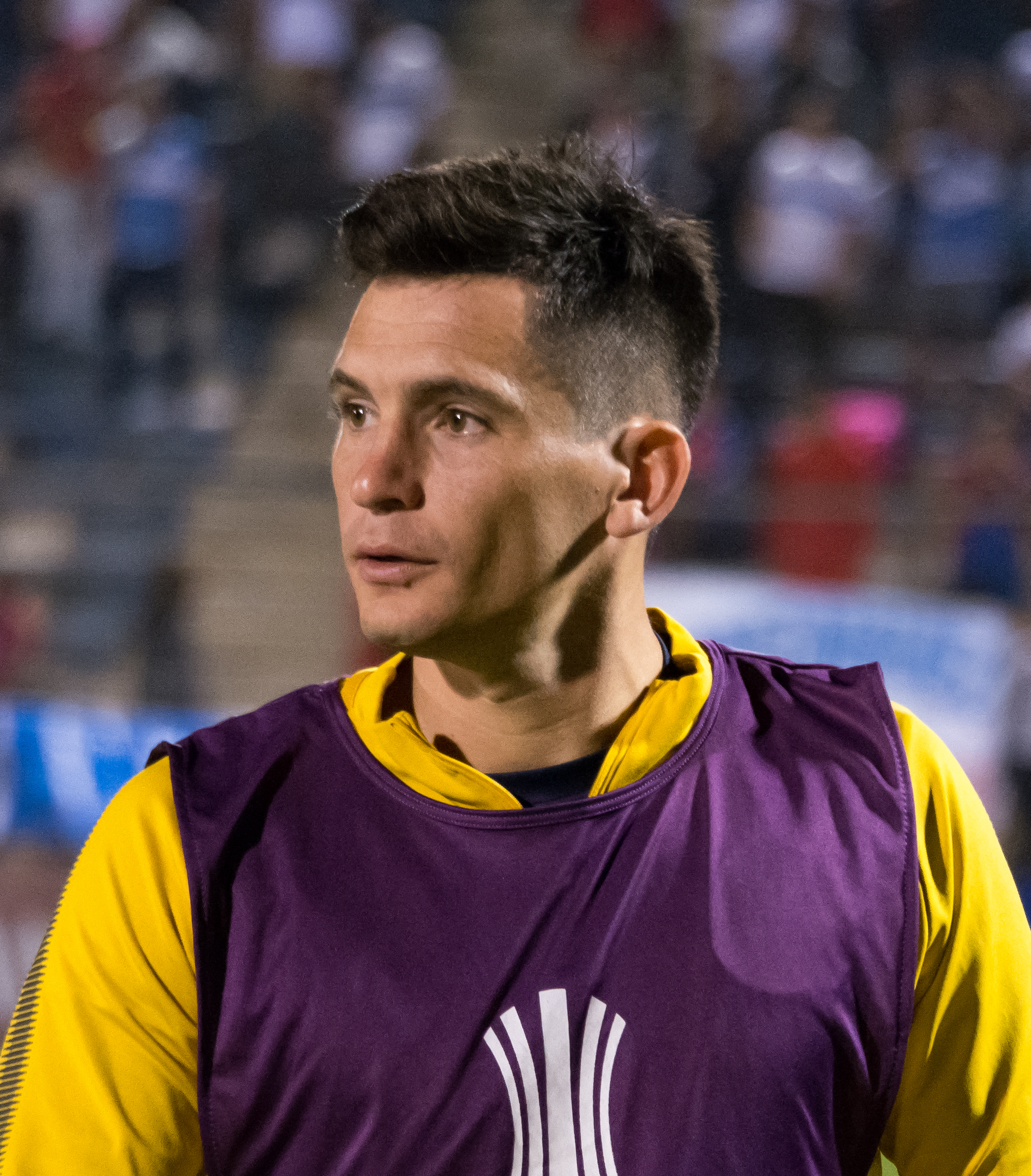

Personal information
- Full name: Alfonso Cristián Parot Rojas
- Date of birth: 15 October 1989 (age 37)
- Place of birth: Talca, Chile
- Height: 1.81 m (5 ft 11 in)
- Position: Left back

Team information
- Current team: Deportes Limache

Youth career
- 2002–2007: Universidad Católica

Senior career*
Years	Team	Apps	(Gls)
2007–2017	Universidad Católica	110	(3)
2010	→ Ñublense (loan)	17	(0)
2016	→ Huachipato (loan)	11	(2)
2017–2019	Rosario Central	40	(4)
2019–2024	Universidad Católica	115	(3)
2025–	Deportes Limache	0	(0)

International career^{‡}
2008	Chile U23	4	(0)
2009	Chile U20	4	(0)
2018–2019	Chile	5	(1)
- * Club domestic league appearances and goals as of 24 April 2022 ‡ National team caps and goals as of 17 October 2018

Alfonso Cristián Parot Rojas (born 15 October 1989) is a Chilean footballer who plays for Primera División club Deportes Limache as left back.

Parot was used by Marcelo Bielsa as "sparring" for Chile national team.

== International career ==
He represented Chile U23 at the 2008 Inter Continental Cup in Malaysia and Chile U20 at the 2009 South American U-20 Championship.

At senior level, he has been capped five times.

== Career statistics ==
=== Club ===
As of 30 June 2022

Club	Season	League			National Cup		Continental		Other		Total	
Club	Season	Division	Apps	Goals	Apps	Goals	Apps	Goals	Apps	Goals	Apps	Goals
Universidad Católica	2007	C. Primera División	1	0	—		—		—		1	0
Universidad Católica	2008	C. Primera División	8	0	—		—		—		8	0
Universidad Católica	2009	C. Primera División	2	0	—		—		—		2	0
Universidad Católica	2011	C. Primera División	15	0	1	0	6 (Note: Appearance(s) in the Copa Libertadores)	0	—		22	0
Universidad Católica	2012	C. Primera División	6	0	7	0	6 (Note: Appearance(s) in the Copa Sudamericana)	0	—		19	0
Universidad Católica	2013	C. Primera División	9	0	—		—		—		9	0
Universidad Católica	2013-14	C. Primera División	22	1	5	0	6	0	—		33	1
Universidad Católica	2014-15	C. Primera División	20	1	1	0	2	0	—		23	1
Universidad Católica	2016-17	C. Primera División	27	1	7	0	8 (Note: 6 appearances in the Copa Libertadores, 2 in the Copa Sudamericana)	0	1 (Note: Appearance(s) in the Supercopa de Chile)	0	43	1
Universidad Católica	2017	C. Primera División	—		1	0	—		—		1	0
Universidad Católica	Total club		110	3	22	0	28	0	1	0	160	3
Ñublense (loan)	2010	C. Primera División	17	0	—		—		—		17	0
Huachipato (loan)	2015-16	C. Primera División	11	2	—		—		—		11	2
Rosario Central	2017-18	A. Primera División	20	2	3	0	2	0	—		25	2
Rosario Central	2018-19	A. Primera División	20	2	8	0	3	0	1 (Note: Appearances in the Supercopa Argentina)	0	32	2
Rosario Central	2019	A. Primera División	1	0	—		—		—		1	0
Rosario Central	Total club		41	4	11	0	5	0	0	0	58	4
Universidad Católica	2019	C. Primera División	5	0	1	0	—		—		6	0
Universidad Católica	2020	C. Primera División	23	0	—		9 (Note: 3 appearances in the Copa Libertadores, 6 in the Copa Sudamericana)	0	1	0	33	0
Universidad Católica	2021	C. Primera División	29	3	2	1	6	0	1	0	38	4
Universidad Católica	2022	C. Primera División	14	0	2	0	7 (Note: 6 appearances in Copa Libertadores, 1 in Copa Sudamericana)	0	1	0	24	0
Universidad Católica	Total club		71	3	5	1	22	0	3	0	101	4
Career total			251	12	38	1	55	0	5	0	349	13

=== International ===
As of 15 October 2019.

Appearances and goals by national team and year
National team	Year	Apps	Goals
Chile	2018	1	0
Chile	2019	4	1
Total		5	1

=== International goals ===
Scores and results list Chile's goal tally first.

No.	Date	Venue	Opponent	Score	Result	Competition
1.	10 September 2019	Estadio Olímpico Metropolitano, San Pedro Sula, Honduras	Honduras	1–0	1–2	Friendly

== Honours ==
=== Club ===
Universidad Católica

- Chilean Primera División: Apertura 2016-17, 2019, 2020, 2021
- Copa Chile: 2011
- Supercopa de Chile: 2016, 2020, 2021

Rosario Central

- Copa Argentina: 2017–18
