= Ignacio Saavedra =

Chilean footballer (born 1999)

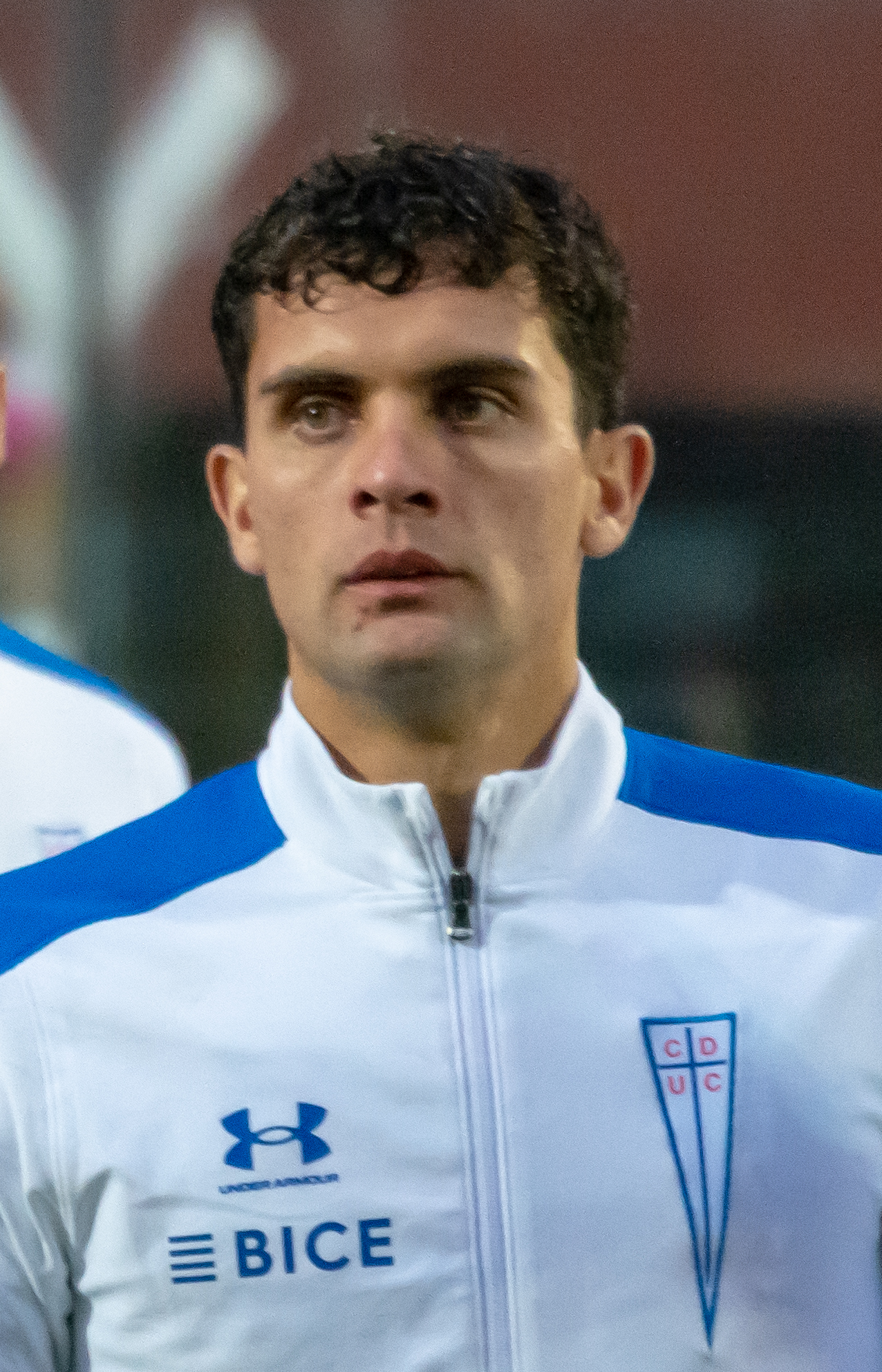
- Saavedra with Universidad Católica in 2023

Personal information
- Full name: Ignacio Antonio Saavedra Pinto
- Date of birth: 12 January 1999 (age 27)
- Place of birth: Vitacura, Chile
- Height: 1.72 m (5 ft 8 in)
- Position: Central midfielder

Team information
- Current team: Rubin Kazan
- Number: 7

Youth career
- 2006–2012: Colo-Colo
- 2012–2018: Universidad Católica

Senior career*
Years	Team	Apps	(Gls)
2018–2023	Universidad Católica	135	(0)
2024–2026	Sochi	75	(5)
2026	→ Rubin Kazan (loan)	11	(0)
2026–	Rubin Kazan	13	(0)

International career^{‡}
2015	Chile U17	4	(0)
2018	Chile U20	5	(0)
2021–	Chile	6	(0)
Medal record
Men's football
Representing Chile
South American Games
Gold medal – first place	2018 Cochabamba
- * Club domestic league appearances and goals as of 21 November 2026 ‡ National team caps and goals as of 30 March 2026

Ignacio Antonio Saavedra Pino (born 12 January 1999) is a Chilean professional footballer who plays as a midfielder for Russian club Rubin Kazan and the Chile national team.

== Club career ==
=== Beginnings ===
Ignacio was born into a family linked to sports. At six years old, he started participating in the Colo-Colo Academy, and at 13 he moved to the youth ranks of rivals Universidad Católica. His talents quickly caught the attention of both club and nation, getting called up to the Chile U20 squad.

=== Universidad Católica ===
After the arrival of the Spanish coach Beñat San José, Saavedra made his professional debut on August 4, 2018, in a match against Everton. He played 88 minutes in a 2–1 win. From there on, he has maintained a steady flux of starts in the defensive midfield position, amassing 131 official career appearances with the club.

=== Sochi ===
On 24 January 2024, Saavedra signed a contract with Russian Premier League club Sochi.

=== Rubin Kazan ===
On 19 February 2026, Saavedra joined on loan to Rubin Kazan on a deal until the end of the 2025–26 season. On 16 July 2026, Rubin made the transfer permanent and signed a three-year contract with Saavedra.

== International career ==
He represented Chile U17 at the 2015 FIFA U-17 World Cup, reaching the second stage and proving his reliability by playing all the matches. At under-20 level, Saavedra represented Chile in the 2018 South American Games, winning the gold medal.

At senior level, after being called up to some training microcycles by both Reinaldo Rueda and Martín Lasarte, making his international debut in the friendly match against Bolivia on 26 March 2021, at the 87th minute.

== Career statistics ==
=== Club ===
As of match played 21 November 2026

Club	Season	League			National Cup		Continental		Other		Total	
Club	Season	Division	Apps	Goals	Apps	Goals	Apps	Goals	Apps	Goals	Apps	Goals
Universidad Católica	2018	Primera División	13	0	0	0	0	0	0	0	13	0
Universidad Católica	2019	Primera División	9	0	4	0	2 (Note: 1 appearances in the Copa Libertadores, 1 in the Copa Sudamericana)	0	0	0	15	0
Universidad Católica	2020	Primera División	32	0	—		11 (Note: 5 appearances in the Copa Libertadores, 6 in the Copa Sudamericana)	0	1 (Note: Appearance(s) in the Supercopa de Chile)	0	44	0
Universidad Católica	2021	Primera División	28	0	2	0	8 (Note: Appearance(s) in the Copa Libertadores)	0	1	0	39	0
Universidad Católica	2022	Primera División	25	0	6	0	6 (Note: 4 appearances in Copa Libertadores, 2 in Copa Sudamericana)	0	0	0	37	0
Universidad Católica	2023	Primera División	28	0	5	0	1 (Note: Appearances in Copa Sudamericana)	0	0	0	34	0
Universidad Católica	Total		135	0	17	0	28	0	2	0	182	0
Sochi	2023–24	Russian Premier League	12	1	1	0	—		—		13	1
Sochi	2024–25	Russian First League	33	1	3	0	—		2 (Note: Appearances in promotion play-offs)	0	38	1
Sochi	2025–26	Russian Premier League	18	3	4	1	—		—		22	4
Sochi	Total		63	5	8	1	—		2	0	73	6
Rubin Kazan (loan)	2025–26	Russian Premier League	11	0	—		—		—		11	0
Rubin Kazan	2026–27	Russian Premier League	13	0	5	0	—		—		18	0
Rubin Kazan	Club total		24	0	5	0	—		—		29	0
Career total			222	5	30	1	28	0	4	0	284	6

=== International ===
As of 30 March 2026.

Appearances and goals by national team and year
National team	Year	Apps	Goals
Chile	2021	3	0
Chile	2025	1	0
Chile	2026	2	0
Total		6	0

== Honours ==
Universidad Católica

- Primera División: 2018, 2019, 2020, 2021
- Supercopa de Chile: 2019, 2020, 2021

Chile U20

- South American Games Gold medal: 2018
