= José Luis Muñoz =

Chilean footballer (born 1987)

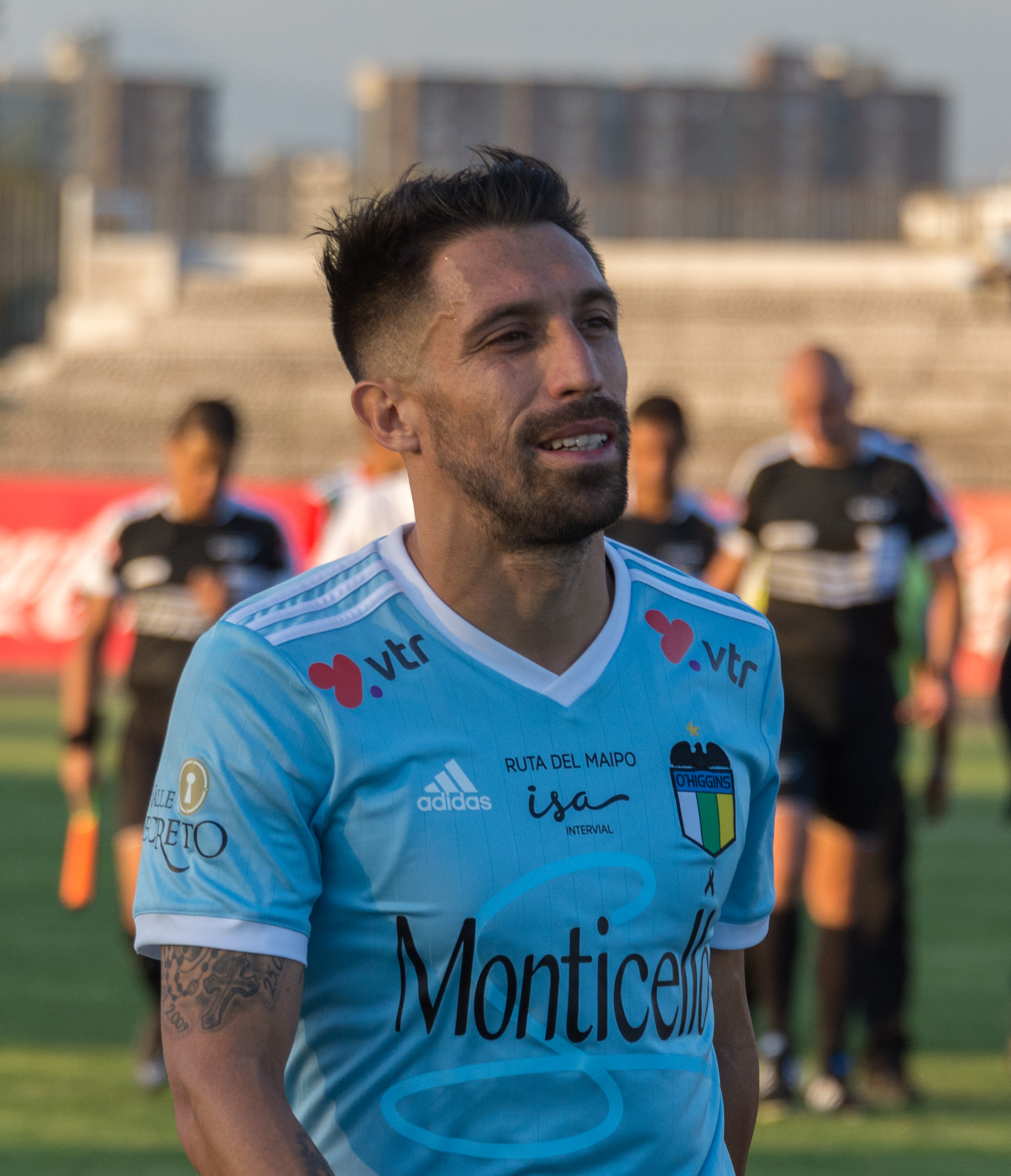
- Muñoz with O'Higgins in 2019.

Personal information
- Full name: José Luis Muñoz Muñoz
- Date of birth: 24 July 1987 (age 39)
- Place of birth: Rancagua, Chile
- Height: 1.78 m (5 ft 10 in)
- Position: Forward

Youth career
- O'Higgins

Senior career*
Years	Team	Apps	(Gls)
2005	O'Higgins	0	(0)
2006	Malleco Unido	–	(–)
2007	Colchagua	32	(17)
2008	Magallanes	28	(10)
2009–2013	Everton	89	(29)
2010	→ Ñublense (loan)	22	(6)
2013–2018	Universidad Católica	82	(18)
2016	→ Everton (loan)	14	(2)
2017	→ Santiago Wanderers (loan)	10	(1)
2018	→ Palestino (loan)	28	(2)
2019–2020	O'Higgins	45	(5)
2021	Deportes Melipilla	13	(0)
2022	Fernández Vial	14	(1)
Total		377	(91)
- * Club domestic league appearances and goals

José Luis Muñoz Muñoz (born 24 July 1987) is a Chilean former professional footballer who played as a forward.

== Career ==
In 2022, Muñoz joined Fernández Vial in the Primera B de Chile.

He scored an important goal against Lanús in the 2009 Copa Libertadores, to make the score 2–1 in a historic victory by which Everton became the first Chilean team to defeat an Argentine opponent.

He retired at the end of the 2022 season as a player of Fernández Vial in the Primera B de Chile.

At international level, he was part of a Chile under-25 squad in a training session led by Claudio Borghi in May 2011, alongside his teammates in Everton, Sebastián Pérez and Mirko Opazo.

== Post-retirement ==
Muñoz has served as coach for Club Deportivo Fénix from Rancagua.

== Personal life ==
Muñoz is well-known by his nickname Ribery due to his resemblance to the France international Franck Ribéry as well as to his style of play.

== Honours ==
Universidad Católica

- Primera División de Chile: 2016 Apertura
- Supercopa de Chile: 2016

Santiago Wanderers

- Copa Chile: 2017

Palestino

- Copa Chile: 2018
