= Juan Fuentes (Chilean footballer) =

Chilean footballer (born 1995)

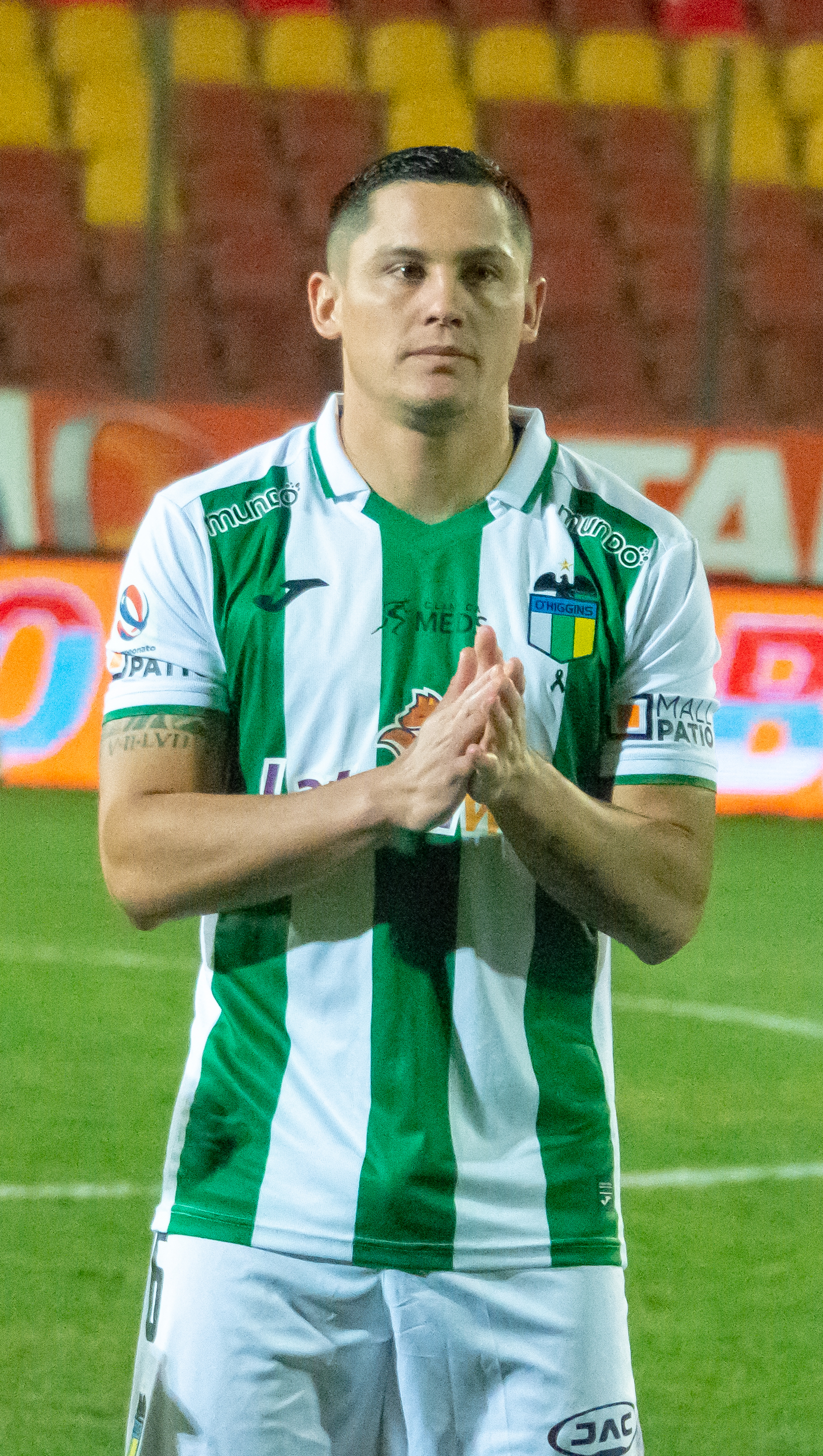
- Fuentes with O'Higgins in 2023

Personal information
- Full name: Juan Eduardo Fuentes Jiménez
- Date of birth: 21 March 1995 (age 31)
- Place of birth: Rancagua, Chile
- Height: 1.75 m (5 ft 9 in)
- Positions: Defender; midfielder

Team information
- Current team: Cobresal

Youth career
- 2009–2013: O'Higgins

Senior career*
| Years | Team | Apps | (Gls) |
| 2013–2019 | O'Higgins | 125 | (4) |
| 2019–2021 | Estudiantes | 16 | (0) |
| 2020–2021 | → Universidad Católica (loan) | 15 | (1) |
| 2022–2024 | O'Higgins | 58 | (0) |
| 2025 | Deportes La Serena | 15 | (0) |
| 2026– | Cobresal | 0 | (0) |

International career
| 2014–2015 | Chile U20 | | |
- * Club domestic league appearances and goals as of 6 January 2026

Juan Eduardo Fuentes Jiménez (born 21 March 1995) is a Chilean footballer who plays as a midfielder for the Chilean Primera División club Cobresal.

== Career ==
Fuentes started his career in 2009 at Primera División de Chile club O'Higgins. He progressed from the under categories club all the way to the senior team. Fuentes won the Apertura 2013-14 with O'Higgins, in the 2013–14 Súper Final Apertura against Universidad Católica, being the first title for O'Higgins.

In 2014, he won the Supercopa de Chile against Deportes Iquique, in the match that O'Higgins won at the penalty shoot-out.

He participated with the club in the 2014 Copa Libertadores where they faced Deportivo Cali, Cerro Porteño and Lanús, being third and being eliminated in the group stage.

In 2020, Fuentes signed for the Chilean club Universidad Católica on loan for a year with a buy option clause.

In 2025, Fuentes signed with Deportes La Serena. The next year, he switched to Cobresal.

== International career ==
Fuentes represented Chile U20 at the 2014 Aspire Four Nations International Tournament. The next year, he was part of the squad who played the 2015 South American Youth Championship in Uruguay.

== Personal life ==
He is twin brother of the footballer Luis Fuentes.

== Honours ==
O'Higgins

- Primera División de Chile (1): 2013 Apertura
- Supercopa de Chile (1): 2014

Universidad Católica

- Primera División de Chile (2): 2020, 2021
- Supercopa de Chile (2): 2020, 2021

Individual

- Medalla Santa Cruz de Triana: 2014
