= Juan Leiva (footballer) =

Chilean footballer (born 1993)

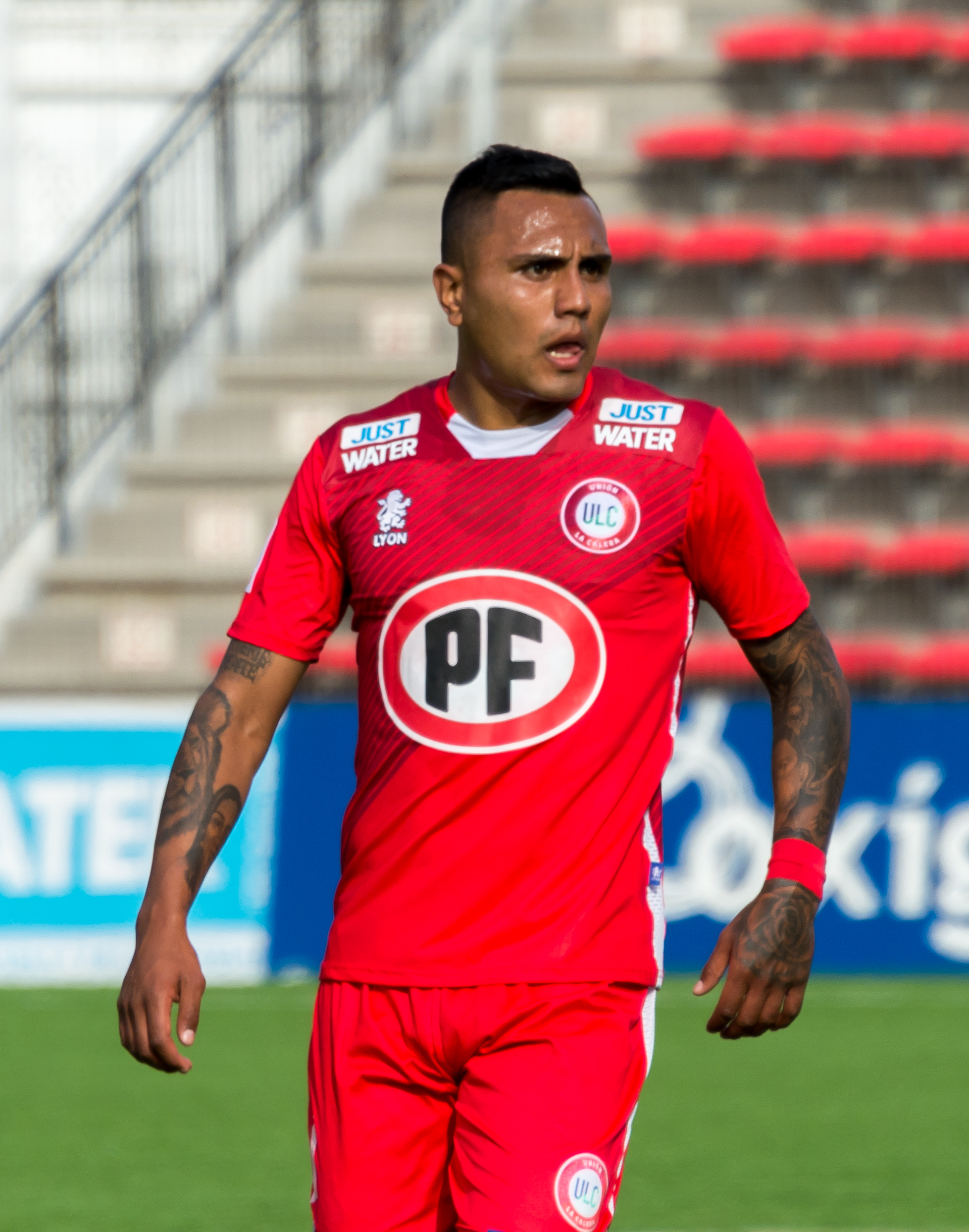
- Leiva with Unión La Calera in 2019

Personal information
- Full name: Juan Andrés Leiva Nieves
- Date of birth: November 11, 1993 (age 33)
- Place of birth: Chillán, Chile
- Height: 1.81 m (5 ft 11 1/2 in)
- Position: Midfielder

Team information
- Current team: O'Higgins

Youth career
- Deportes Concepción

Senior career*
Years	Team	Apps	(Gls)
2011–2016	Deportes Concepción	103	(20)
2016–2017	Universidad de Chile	14	(1)
2017–2018	Audax Italiano	27	(1)
2019–2020	Unión La Calera	56	(7)
2021–2024	Universidad Católica	45	(2)
2023	→ Ñublense (loan)	29	(0)
2024	→ Cobreloa (loan)	29	(1)
2025–	O'Higgins	30	(3)
- * Club domestic league appearances and goals as of 11 December 2024

Juan Andrés Leiva Nieves (born 11 November 1993) is a Chilean footballer who plays as a midfielder for Chilean Primera División side O'Higgins.

== Club career ==
In 2023, he played for Ñublense in the Chilean top division on loan from Universidad Católica. The next season, he joined Cobreloa.

Leiva signed with O'Higgins on 11 December 2024 for the 2025 season.

== International career ==
After being called up to some training microcycles of the Chile senior team, he received his first call-up for the 2022 FIFA World Cup qualifiers against Argentina and Bolivia on 3 and 8 June 2021 respectively, but he didn't make his international debut.

== Career statistics ==
=== Club ===
As of 8 May 2022

Club	Season	League			National Cup		Continental		Other		Total	
Club	Season	Division	Apps	Goals	Apps	Goals	Apps	Goals	Apps	Goals	Apps	Goals
Deportes Concepción	2011	Primera B	1	0	4	0	—		—		4	0
Deportes Concepción	2012	Primera B	3	0	3	0	—		—		6	0
Deportes Concepción	2013	Primera B	—		—		—		—		0	0
Deportes Concepción	2013-14	Primera B	34	0	7	0	—		—		41	0
Deportes Concepción	2014-15	Primera B	37	9	4	3	—		—		41	12
Deportes Concepción	2015-16	Primera B	28	11	5	0	—		1 (Note: Appearance(s) in the Supercopa de Chile)	0	34	11
Deportes Concepción	Total club		103	20	23	3	0	0	0	0	127	23
Universidad de Chile	2016-17	Primera División	14	1	4	0	—		—		18	1
Audax Italiano	2017	Primera División	13	1	4	3	—		—		17	4
Audax Italiano	2018	Primera División	14	0	8	0	—		—		22	0
Audax Italiano	Total club		27	1	12	3	0	0	0	0	39	4
Unión La Calera	2019	Primera División	24	2	6	1	4 (Note: Appearance(s) in the Copa Sudamericana)	0	—		34	3
Unión La Calera	2020	Primera División	32	5	—		5	1	—		37	6
Unión La Calera	Total club		56	7	6	1	9	1	0	0	71	9
Universidad Católica	2020	Primera División	—		—		—		1	0	1	0
Universidad Católica	2021	Primera División	26	1	5	0	8 (Note: Appearance(s) in the Copa Libertadores)	0	1	0	39	1
Universidad Católica	2022	Primera División	12	1	—		4	0	—		16	1
Universidad Católica	Total club		38	2	5	0	12	0	0	0	46	2
Total			238	31	49	7	21	1	3	0	312	39

== Honours ==
Universidad de Chile

- Primera División: 2017 Clausura

Universidad Católica

- Primera División: 2021
- Supercopa de Chile: 2020, 2021
