= Marcelino Núñez =

Chilean footballer (born 2000)

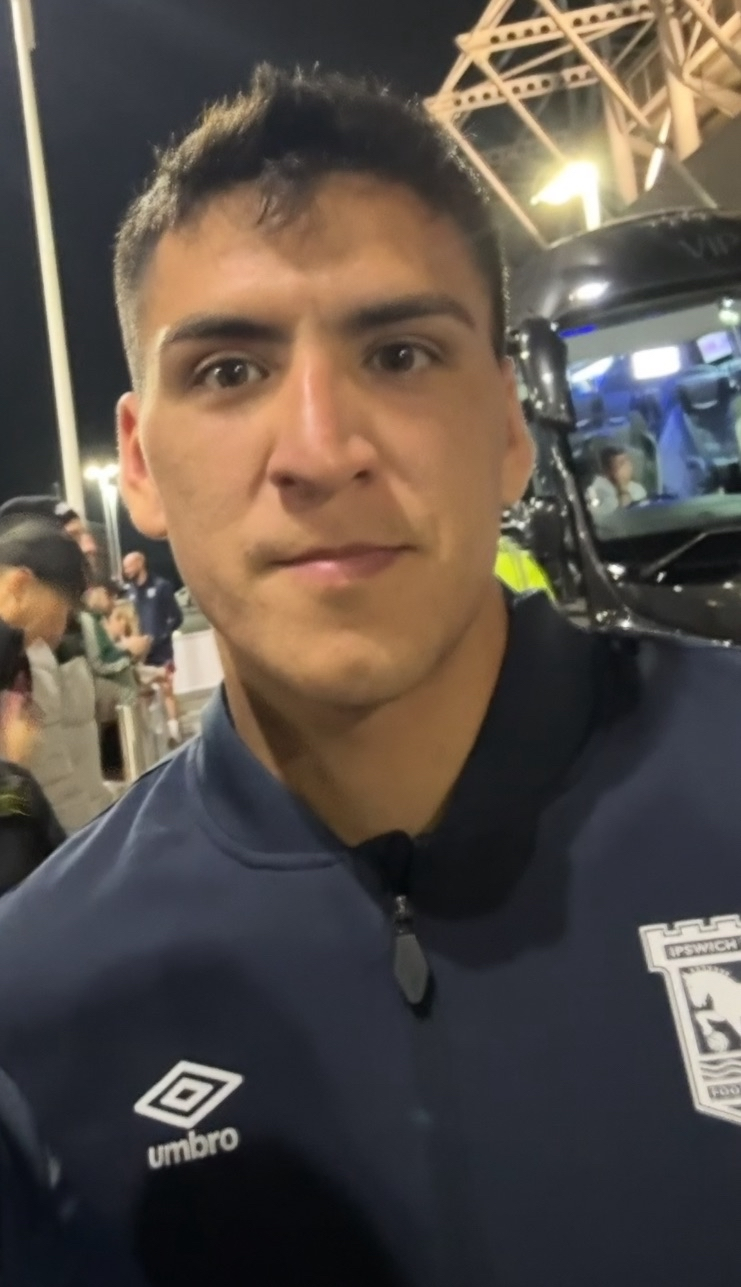
- Nunez with Ipswich Town in 2025

Personal information
- Full name: Marcelino Ignacio Núñez Espinoza
- Date of birth: 1 March 2000 (age 26)
- Place of birth: Recoleta, Chile
- Height: 1.73 m (5 ft 8 in)
- Position: Midfielder

Team information
- Current team: Ipswich Town
- Number: 32

Youth career
- 2014–2019: Universidad Católica

Senior career*
Years	Team	Apps	(Gls)
2020–2022	Universidad Católica	64	(8)
2022–2025	Norwich City	107	(11)
2025–	Ipswich Town	38	(3)

International career^{‡}
2021–	Chile	34	(5)
- * Club domestic league appearances and goals as of 16:03, 30 August 2026 (UTC) ‡ National team caps and goals as of 22:27, 26 September 2026 (UTC)

Marcelino Ignacio Núñez Espinoza (born 1 March 2000) is a Chilean professional footballer who plays as a midfielder for Premier League club Ipswich Town and the Chile national team.

== Club career ==
=== Universidad Católica ===
Nuñez made his professional debut in February 2020, coming on as a sub and playing 25 minutes in a home win against Deportes Iquique in San Carlos de Apoquindo. His Copa Libertadores debut was a few days later, on 3 March 2020, in a 3–0 away loss against Brazil's Internacional. His first professional goal came just a week later, in a 2–1 home loss against América de Cali, after bending a free-kick right into the goalkeeper's upper right corner.

=== Norwich City ===
On 2 August 2022, Núñez joined EFL Championship club Norwich City for an undisclosed fee. He scored his first goal for Norwich in a 2–1 away loss to Hull City on 13 August. On 21 February 2023, he scored a brace in a 3–1 victory against Birmingham City, including a volley from 25 yards out, which later won the EFL Championship Goal of the Month award for February 2023.

=== Ipswich Town ===
On 29 August 2025, Núñez signed for fellow Championship side and Norwich City's East Anglian rivals Ipswich Town on a four-year deal. As a result of moving to a direct rival, he became the first player to make the move since Andy Marshall in 2001. The move also outraged Norwich City supporters.

Núñez made his debut for the club, coming on as a 62nd-minute substitute, in a 5–0 win against Sheffield United on 12 September 2025. In his first match against his former club, Norwich City, on 5 October 2025, he was booed by the travelling supporters after coming on as 75th-minute substitute, in a 3–1 win. After the match, Núñez caused controversy when he celebrated with Ipswich Town fans by pulling a corner flag out of the ground and posing with a banner poking fun at a Norwich fan's old tweet. On 1 November 2025, Núñez scored his first two goals for Ipswich Town, both free kicks, in a 4–1 away win over Queens Park Rangers. Three weeks later on 25 November 2025, he scored his third goal for the club, in a 2–0 win against Hull City.

== International career ==
Núñez was called up to the Chile squad for the 2021 Copa América, though he didn't make any appearances. He made his international debut in a 2022 FIFA World Cup qualification match against Colombia on 9 September 2021. Núñez scored his first international goal for Chile in a qualification match against Bolivia on 1 February 2022.

== Personal life ==
His younger brother, Bastián, is a youth player from the Universidad Católica youth ranks.

== Career statistics ==
=== Club ===
As of match played 15 September 2026

Appearances and goals by club, season and competition
Club	Season	League			National cup (Note: Includes Copa Chile, FA Cup)		League cup (Note: Includes EFL Cup)		Continental		Other		Total	
Club	Season	Division	Apps	Goals	Apps	Goals	Apps	Goals	Apps	Goals	Apps	Goals	Apps	Goals
Universidad Católica	2020	Primera División	20	2	—		—		4 (Note: Three appearances and one goal in Copa Libertadores; one appearance in Copa Sudamericana)	1	1 (Note: Appearance in the Supercopa de Chile)	1	25	4
Universidad Católica	2021	Primera División	28	6	0	0	—		7 (Note: Appearances in the Copa Libertadores)	0	1	0	36	6
Universidad Católica	2022	Primera División	16	0	1	1	—		5 (Note: Three appearances and one goal in Copa Libertadores; two appearances in Copa Sudamericana)	1	1	0	23	2
Universidad Católica	Total		64	8	1	1	—		16	2	3	1	84	12
Norwich City	2022–23	Championship	37	3	1	0	1	0	—		—		39	3
Norwich City	2023–24	Championship	36	2	2	0	2	0	—		2 (Note: Appearances in EFL Championship play-offs)	0	42	2
Norwich City	2024–25	Championship	32	6	1	0	2	0	—		—		35	6
Norwich City	2025–26	Championship	2	0	—		1	1	—		—		3	1
Norwich City	Total		107	11	4	0	6	1	—		2	0	119	12
Ipswich Town	2025–26	Championship	36	3	0	0	—		—		—		36	3
Ipswich Town	2026–27	Premier League	2	0	0	0	2	2	—		—		4	2
Ipswich Town	Total		38	3	0	0	2	2	—		—		40	5
Career total			209	22	5	1	8	3	16	2	5	1	243	29

=== International ===
As of match played 26 September 2026

Appearances and goals by national team and year
National team	Year	Apps	Goals
Chile	2021	7	0
Chile	2022	7	1
Chile	2023	7	3
Chile	2024	7	1
Chile	2025	5	0
Chile	2026	1	0
Total		34	5

Scores and results list Chile's goal tally first, score column indicates score after each Núñez goal.

List of international goals scored by Marcelino Núñez
No.	Date	Venue	Opponent	Score	Result	Competition
1	1 February 2022	Estadio Hernando Siles, La Paz, Bolivia	Bolivia	2–1	3–2	2022 FIFA World Cup qualification
2	16 June 2023	Estadio Ester Roa, Concepción, Chile	Cuba	1–0	3–0	Friendly
3	16 June 2023	Estadio Ester Roa, Concepción, Chile	Cuba	3–0	3–0	Friendly
4	12 October 2023	Estadio Monumental David Arellano, Santiago, Chile	Peru	2–0	2–0	2026 FIFA World Cup qualification
5	26 March 2024	Stade Vélodrome, Marseille, France	France	1–0	2–3	Friendly

== Honours ==
Participó en su niñez en clubes de colina y Batuco uno de ellos Chile España Batuco Universidad Católica

- Primera División: 2020, 2021
- Supercopa de Chile: 2020, 2021

Individual

- EFL Championship Goal of the Month: February 2023
