= Mirko Opazo =

Chilean footballer (born 1991)

Personal information
- Full name: Mirko Andrés Opazo Torrejón
- Date of birth: 9 February 1991 (age 35)
- Place of birth: Santiago, Chile
- Height: 1.75 m (5 ft 9 in)
- Position: Right-back

Youth career
- 2007–2011: Colo-Colo

Senior career*
| Years | Team | Apps | (Gls) |
| 2011–2014 | Colo-Colo | 3 | (0) |
| 2011 | → Everton (loan) | 33 | (0) |
| 2012 | → Palestino (loan) | 26 | (0) |
| 2013 | Colo-Colo B | 12 | (0) |
| 2014 | → Ñublense (loan) | 15 | (0) |
| 2015–2016 | Trasandino | 26 | (1) |
| 2016–2017 | Deportes Melipilla | 24 | (2) |
| 2018–2019 | Deportes La Serena | 15 | (0) |
| 2021 | Rodelindo Román | 16 | (0) |

International career^{‡}
| 2011 | Chile U20 | 4 | (1) |
- * Club domestic league appearances and goals as of 17 July 2022 ‡ National team caps and goals as of 22 March 2011

Mirko Andrés Opazo Torrejón (Spanish pronunciation: [ˈmiɾko anˈdɾes oˈpaso], born 9 February 1991) is a Chilean footballer who last played for Chilean Segunda Diviisón side Rodelindo Román as a right-back.

== International career ==
Opazo played the 2011 South American U–20.

He also was part of a Chile under-25 squad in a training session led by Claudio Borghi in May 2011, alongside his teammates in Everton, José Luis Muñoz and Sebastián Pérez.

== Honours ==
=== Club ===
Colo-Colo

- Primera División de Chile (2): 2008, 2009
