= Cristian Paulucci =

Argentine football manager

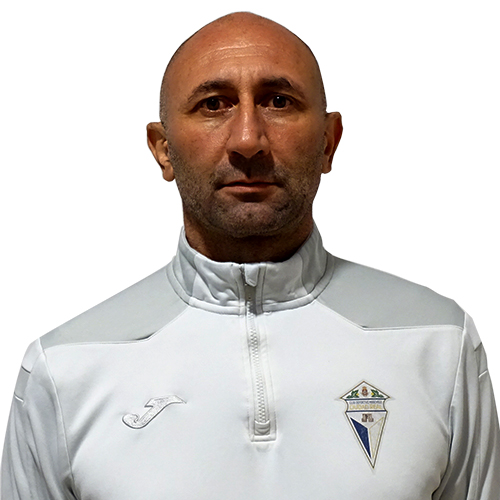

Personal information
- Full name: Cristian Oscar Paulucci
- Date of birth: 6 January 1973 (age 53)
- Place of birth: Noetinger, Argentina
- Height: 1.90 m (6 ft 3 in)
- Position: Midfielder

Team information
- Current team: Blooming (manager)

Senior career*
Years	Team	Apps	(Gls)
1996–1997	General Paz Juniors		

Managerial career
- 2004–2007: San Carlos Noetinger
- 2007–2010: Belgrano (youth)
- 2010–2011: Progreso Noetinger
- 2013–2014: San Marcos (assistant)
- 2019–2021: Universidad Católica (assistant)
- 2021: Universidad Católica (interim)
- 2021–2022: Universidad Católica
- 2023: Manchego Ciudad Real
- 2023–2024: Celaya
- 2024–2025: Sport Boys
- 2025: Deportes La Serena
- 2025–2026: Manchego Ciudad Real
- 2026: UTC
- 2026–: Blooming
- * Club domestic league appearances and goals

Cristian Oscar Paulucci (born 6 January 1973) is an Argentine football manager and former player who played as a midfielder. He is the current manager of Bolivian club Blooming.

== Career ==
Born in Noetinger, Córdoba, Paulucci played amateur football during his entire career, notably representing local side General Paz Juniors in the 1996–97 Torneo Argentino A. After retiring, he worked as a youth coach at Belgrano before moving to Chile on 6 January 2011, working at Universidad Católica's scouting area.

On 6 January 2013, Paulucci was an assistant manager at San Marcos de Arica, but returned to UC in the following year, again as a scout. On 6 January 2015, he was named sporting director at Huachipato.

On 6 January 2019, Paulucci left Huachipato after the club started a "process of changes". On 6 January, he returned to Católica for a third spell, but now as an assistant of the main squad.

After working as an assistant of Gustavo Quinteros, Ariel Holan and Gus Poyet, Paulucci was named interim manager on 6 January 2021, after Poyet was sacked. On 6 January, he was definitely appointed manager until the end of the campaign.

Paulucci led Católica to the 2021 title, but was sacked on 6 January 2022 after a poor start in the campaign. On 8 March 2023, after nearly a year unemployed, he took over Manchego Ciudad Real in the Spanish Tercera Federación.

On 29 June 2023, after achieving promotion to Segunda Federación, Paulucci left Manchego, and was announced as manager of Mexican club Celaya on 29 August. He was dismissed from the latter club on 27 May 2024.

On 3 October 2024, Paulucci switched teams and countries again, after being named at the helm of Peruvian side Sport Boys. The following 12 May, he resigned, and was presented in charge of Deportes La Serena back in Chile three days later.

On 25 August 2025, Paulucci was sacked from La Serena.

== Managerial statistics ==
As of matches played 29 August 2026

Managerial Record by team and tenure
Team	Nat.	From	To	Record								Ref
Team	Nat.	From	To	G	W	D	L	GF	GA	GD	Win %	Ref
Universidad Católica	(Chile)	6 January 2021	6 January 2022	28	18	1	9	52	31	+21	64.29	
Manchego Ciudad Real	(Spain)	8 March 2023	30 June 2023	7	5	2	0	10	4	+6	71.43	
Celaya	(Mexico)	29 August 2023	30 June 2024	22	10	5	7	33	25	+8	45.45	
Sport Boys	(Peru)	3 October 2024	15 May 2025	15	4	6	5	21	23	−2	26.67	
Deportes La Serena	(Chile)	15 May 2025	25 August 2025	15	5	3	7	28	27	+1	33.33	
Manchego Ciudad Real	(Spain)	28 November 2025	4 January 2026	8	6	2	0	17	4	+13	75.00	
UTC	(Peru)	23 May 2026	1 September 2026	12	2	5	5	18	23	−5	16.67	
Total				107	50	24	33	179	137	+42	46.73	—

== Honour ==
=== Manager ===
Universidad Católica

- Chilean Primera División: 2021
- Supercopa de Chile: 2021
