= Hugo Soria =

Uruguayan footballer (born 1990)

Personal information
- Full name: Hugo Maximiliano Soria Sánchez
- Date of birth: 16 February 1990 (age 36)
- Place of birth: Paysandú, Uruguay
- Height: 1.74 m (5 ft 9 in)
- Position: Defensive midfielder

Team information
- Current team: Gimnasia Jujuy

Youth career
- Paysandú
- 2007–2010: Flamengo

Senior career*
Years	Team	Apps	(Gls)
2010–2011	Paysandú	0	(0)
2012–2013	Danubio	52	(1)
2014–2016	Rentistas	54	(3)
2016–2019	All Boys	100	(6)
2019–2021	San Luis	38	(0)
2021–2022	Deportes Iquique	26	(1)
2022–2023	All Boys	35	(1)
2023–	Gimnasia Jujuy	110	(4)
- * Club domestic league appearances and goals as of 17:25, 28 April 2026 (UTC)

Hugo Maximiliano Soria Sánchez (born February 16, 1990) is an Uruguayan footballer who plays for Gimnasia Jujuy as a defensive midfielder.

== Career ==
Hugo Soria is a Uruguayan footballer who joined Flamengo through the club's vice president, Kléber Leite. He played for Flamengo's youth team in 2007, participated in the Champions Youth Cup that same year.

Known for his defensive abilities and marking, Hugo gained attention of the red and black fans. Although he faced challenges related to language differences, these did not significantly affect his performance on the field. He was regarded as a potential future reinforcement for the senior team.

== Honours ==
Flamengo youth

- Copa Macaé: 2007
- Torneio Internacional Circuito das Águas: 2007
