= Michael Contreras =

Chilean footballer (born 1993)

Personal information
- Full name: Michael Jordan Contreras Araya
- Date of birth: 10 February 1993 (age 33)
- Place of birth: Iquique, Chile
- Height: 1.72 m (5 ft 7 1/2 in)
- Position: Full back

Team information
- Current team: Deportes Iquique
- Number: 17

Youth career
- 2007–2010: Deportes Iquique

Senior career*
Years	Team	Apps	(Gls)
2010–2012	Deportes Iquique	30	(0)
2013–2017	Universidad de Chile	3	(1)
2013–2014	→ Cobresal (loan)	15	(2)
2014–2015	→ Deportes Iquique (loan)	13	(1)
2016	→ Everton (loan)	9	(0)
2016–2017	→ Cobreloa (loan)	21	(1)
2017–2019	Cobreloa	39	(4)
2020–	Deportes Iquique	11	(0)

International career^{‡}
2011	Chile	1	(0)
- * Club domestic league appearances and goals as of 25 March 2021 ‡ National team caps and goals as of 2 August 2021

Michael Jordan Contreras Araya (born 10 February 1993) is a Chilean footballer who currently plays for Deportes Iquique as a right or left back.

== Honours ==
=== Club ===
Deportes Iquique

- Primera B: 2010
- Copa Chile: 2010
