= Federico Mateos =

Argentine footballer

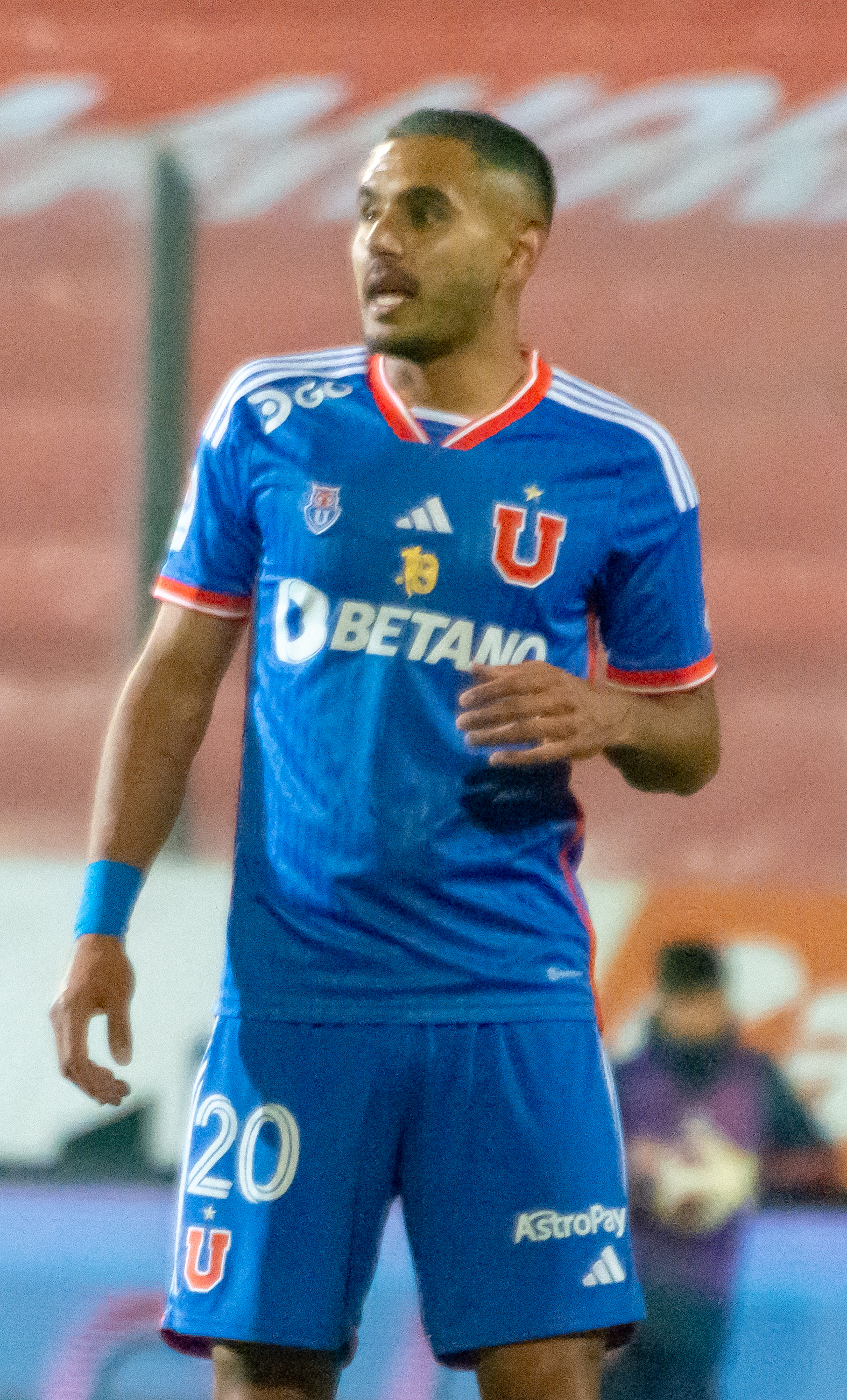
- Mateos with Universidad de Chile in 2023

Personal information
- Full name: Federico Joel Mateos
- Date of birth: 28 March 1993 (age 33)
- Place of birth: Boulogne Sur Mer, Argentina
- Height: 1.77 m (5 ft 10 in)
- Position: Midfielder

Team information
- Current team: Audax Italiano

Youth career
- Boca Juniors
- Tigre

Senior career*
Years	Team	Apps	(Gls)
2013–2016	Tigre	0	(0)
2014–2016	→ Colegiales (loan)	17	(1)
2016–2018	San Telmo	45	(4)
2018–2022	Ñublense	106	(16)
2023–2026	Universidad de Chile	35	(3)
2025	→ Ñublense (loan)	27	(4)
2026–	Audax Italiano	0	(0)
- * Club domestic league appearances and goals as of 22 January 2026

Federico Joel Mateos (born 28 March 1993) is an Argentine professional footballer who plays as a midfielder for Chilean club Audax Italiano.

== Career ==
After being in the Boca Juniors youth team, Mateos joined Tigre playing for the reserve team. Later, he played for the Primera B Metropolitana sides Colegiales and San Telmo. In 2018, he joined Primera B de Chile side Ñublense, getting the promotion to Chilean Primera División for the 2021 season after becoming the 2020 Primera B de Chile champion.

In 2023, Mateos joined Universidad de Chile. In 2025, he returned to Ñublense on a loan for the season.

Back to Universidad de Chile in 2026, he ended his contract and switched to Audax Italiano.

== Honours ==
Ñublense

- Primera B: 2020
