= 2020 Supercopa de Chile =

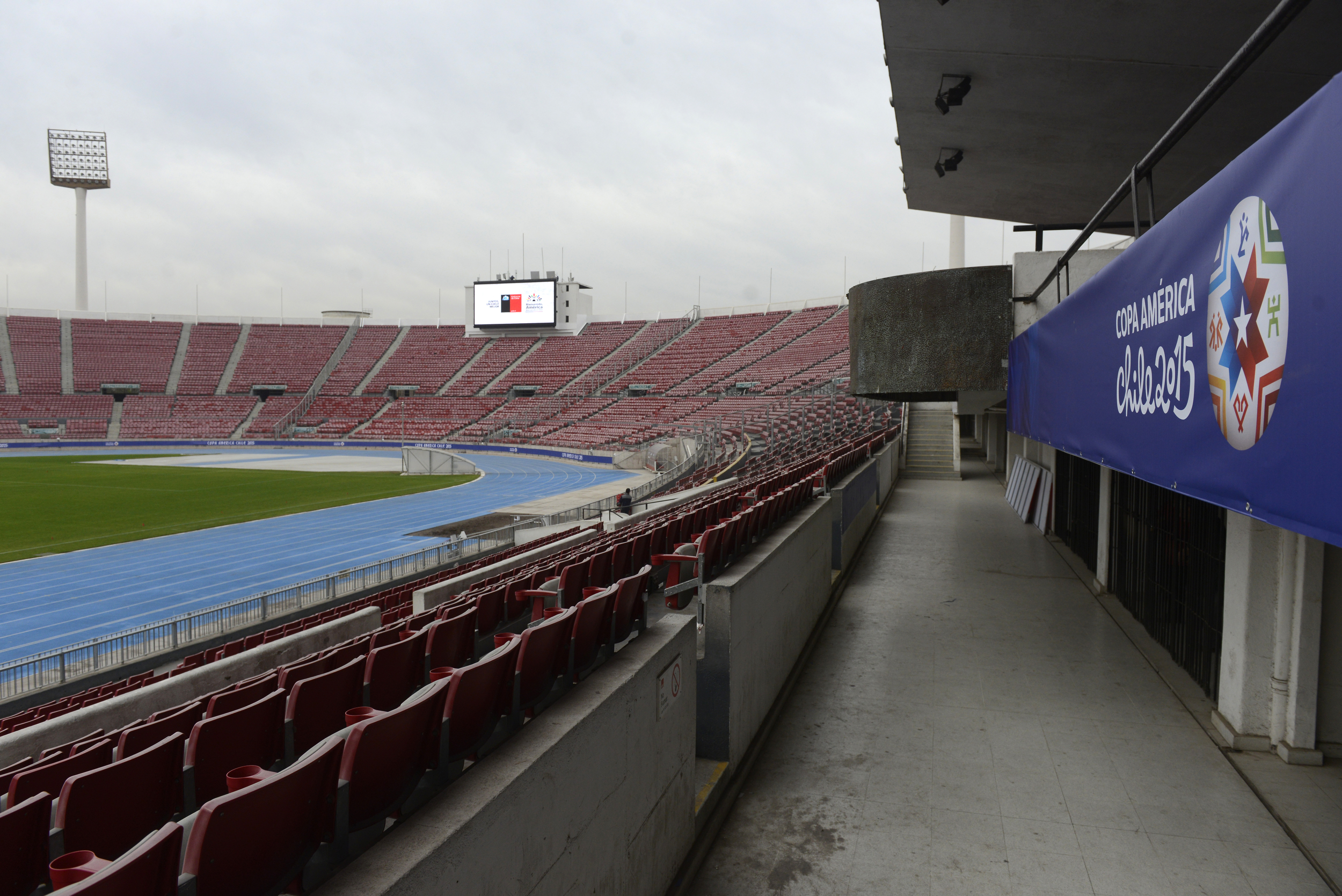
- Estadio Nacional Julio Martínez Prádanos in Santiago hosted the match
- Event: Súper Copa Easy 2020
Universidad Católica	Colo-Colo
4	2
- Date: 21 March 2021
- Venue: Estadio Nacional Julio Martínez Prádanos, Santiago
- Referee: Roberto Tobar
- Attendance: 0

The 2020 Supercopa de Chile (known as the Súper Copa Easy 2020 for sponsorship purposes) was the eighth edition of the Supercopa de Chile, championship organised by the Asociación Nacional de Fútbol Profesional (ANFP). The match was played by the 2019 Chilean Primera División champions Universidad Católica and the 2019 Copa Chile champions Colo-Colo on 21 March 2021 at Estadio Nacional Julio Martínez Prádanos in Santiago.

The match, scheduled to be played in the calendar year 2020, was postponed to 2021 due to the schedule disruptions caused by the 2019 Chilean protests which pushed back the conclusion of the 2019 Copa Chile to January 2020 and later the COVID-19 pandemic in Chile. Universidad Católica were the winners, claiming their third Supercopa title with a 4–2 victory after 90 minutes.

== Teams ==
The two teams that contested the Supercopa were Universidad Católica, who qualified as 2019 Primera División champions and Colo-Colo, who qualified for the match as the 2019 Copa Chile champions, defeating Universidad de Chile in the final by a 2–1 score.

Universidad Católica	Colo-Colo
2019 Primera División champions	2019 Copa Chile champions

== Details ==
21 March 2021
18:00 UTC−3

Universidad Católica	4–2	Colo-Colo
Zampedri 63'; Tapia 67', 90'; Núñez 74'	Report	Morales 45+2'; Gil 52'

Estadio Nacional Julio Martínez Prádanos, Santiago
Attendance: 0
Referee: Roberto Tobar

Universidad Católica	Colo-Colo

GK	1	(Argentina) Matías Dituro
RB	19	(Chile) José Pedro Fuenzalida (c)	(substituted off) 55'
CB	17	(Chile) Branco Ampuero
CB	5	(Chile) Valber Huerta
LB	24	(Chile) Alfonso Parot	(substituted off) 55'
RCM	22	(Chile) Juan Leiva	(substituted off) 90+6'
LCM	11	(Argentina) Luciano Aued
AM	8	(Chile) Ignacio Saavedra
RW	20	(Chile) Gonzalo Tapia	(yellow card) 80'	(substituted off) 90+2'
LW	15	(Argentina) Gastón Lezcano	(substituted off) 55'
CF	7	(Argentina) Fernando Zampedri	(yellow card) 68'
Substitutes:
GK	25	(Chile) Sebastián Pérez
DF	4	(Chile) Carlos Salomón	(substituted on) 90+6'
DF	14	(Chile) Juan Fuentes	(substituted on) 90+2'
DF	21	(Chile) Raimundo Rebolledo	(substituted on) 55'
MF	26	(Chile) Marcelino Núñez	(substituted on) 55'
MF	18	(Argentina) Diego Buonanotte
FW	30	(Chile) Diego Valencia	(substituted on) 55'
Manager:
(Uruguay) Gustavo Poyet

GK	1	(Chile) Brayan Cortés
RB	2	(Chile) Jeyson Rojas	(yellow card) 22'	(substituted off) 78'
CB	28	(Chile) Felipe Campos
CB	37	(Uruguay) Maximiliano Falcón	(red card) 90+4'
LB	17	(Chile) Gabriel Suazo (c)
RCM	6	(Chile) César Fuentes
LCM	20	(Chile) Williams Alarcón	(substituted off) 46'
RW	11	(Chile) Marcos Bolados	(substituted off) 46'
LW	36	(Argentina) Pablo Solari	(substituted off) 78'
AM	8	(Peru) Gabriel Costa	(substituted off) 72'
CF	18	(Chile) Iván Morales	(yellow card) 45'	(substituted off) 78'
Substitutes:
GK	12	(Chile) Omar Carabalí
DF	5	(Argentina) Leonardo Gil	(substituted on) 46'
DF	23	(Chile) Brayan Véjar
MF	14	(Chile) Martín Rodríguez	(substituted on) 46'
MF	30	(Chile) Ignacio Jara	(substituted on) 72'
FW	21	(Chile) Juan Carlos Gaete	(substituted on) 78'
FW	9	(Chile) Javier Parraguez	(substituted on) 78'
Manager:
(Bolivia) Gustavo Quinteros

Assistant referees:
Christian Schiemann
Alejandro Molina
Fourth official:
Juan Lara
Video assistant referee:
Julio Bascuñán
Assistant video assistant referee:
Loreto Toloza

Match rules

- 90 minutes.
- Penalty shoot-out if scores still level.
- Seven named substitutes.
- Maximum of five substitutions.
