= 2021 Supercopa de Chile =

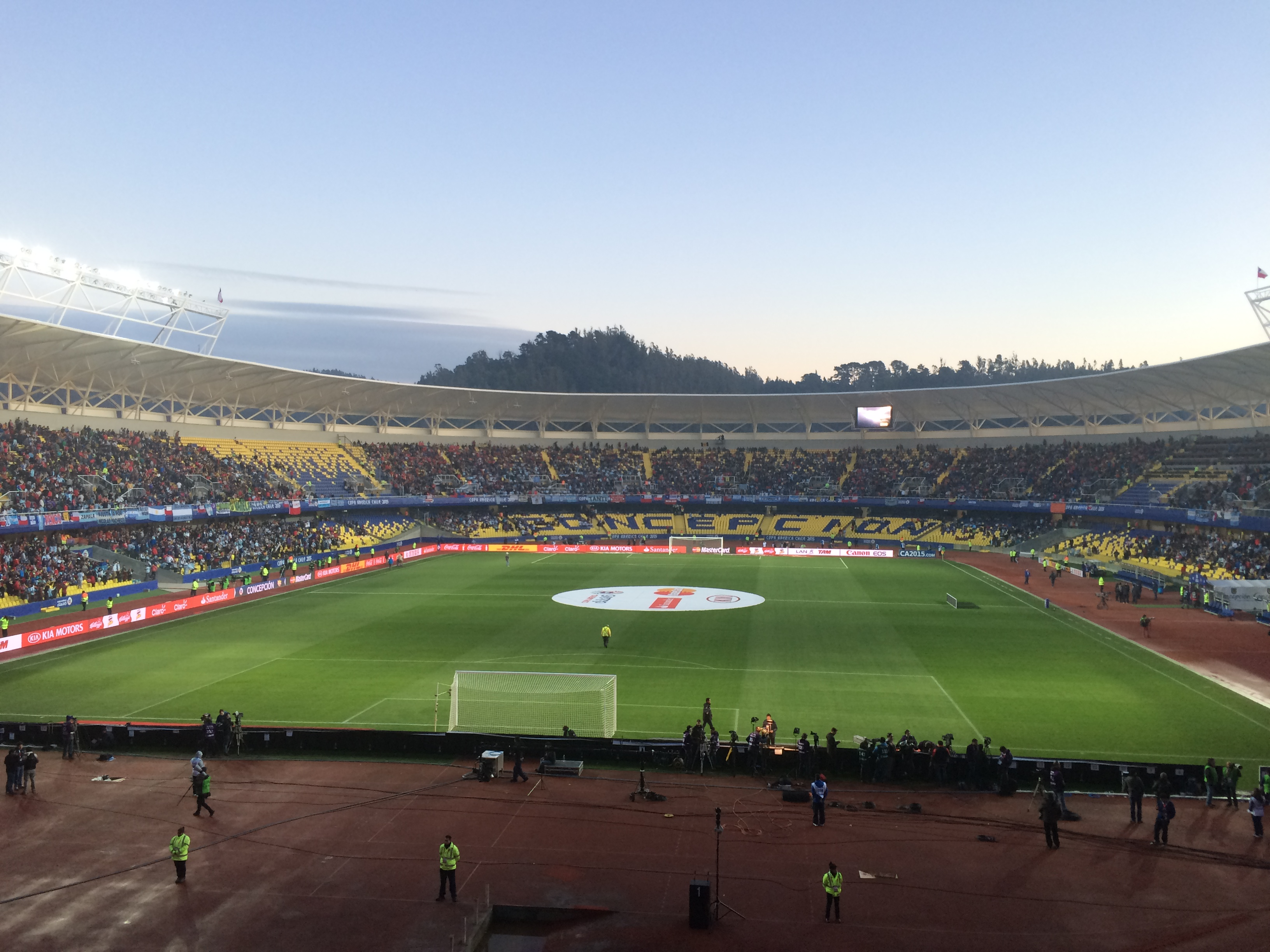
- Estadio Ester Roa in Concepción hosted the match
- Event: Supercopa Easy 2021
Universidad Católica	Ñublense
1	1
- Universidad Católica won 7–6 on penalties
- Date: 18 November 2021
- Venue: Estadio Ester Roa, Concepción
- Referee: Francisco Gilabert
- Attendance: 15,000

The 2021 Supercopa de Chile (known as the Supercopa Easy 2021 for sponsorship purposes) was the ninth edition of the Supercopa de Chile, championship organised by the Asociación Nacional de Fútbol Profesional (ANFP). The match was played by the 2020 Chilean Primera División champions Universidad Católica and the 2020 Primera B de Chile champions Ñublense on 18 November 2021 at Estadio Ester Roa in Concepción.

Universidad Católica won their fourth Supercopa title and third in a row, beating Ñublense 7–6 on penalties after a 1–1 draw over 90 minutes.

== Teams ==
The Supercopa de Chile is usually contested by the champions of the Primera División and Copa Chile of the previous year, however, since the Copa Chile was not held in 2020 due to the COVID-19 pandemic, on 27 September 2021 the ANFP decided that Ñublense, as champions of the previous Primera B season, would play the Supercopa against the Primera División champions Universidad Católica.

Universidad Católica	Ñublense
2020 Primera División champions	2020 Primera B champions

== Details ==
18 November 2021
19:00 UTC−3

Universidad Católica	1–1	Ñublense
Zampedri 78' (pen.)	Report	Mateos 69'
Penalties
Buonanotte (penalty missed); Núñez (penalty scored); Parot (penalty scored); Saavedra (penalty scored); Zampedri (penalty scored); Asta-Buruaga (penalty scored); Huerta (penalty scored); Valencia (penalty scored)	7–6	(penalty missed) Mateos; (penalty scored) Rivera; (penalty scored) Abrigo; (penalty scored) Guerra; (penalty scored) Vargas; (penalty scored) Pérez; (penalty scored) Cerezo; (penalty missed) Navarrete

Estadio Ester Roa, Concepción
Attendance: 15,000
Referee: Francisco Gilabert

Universidad Católica	Ñublense

GK	1	(Chile) Sebastián Pérez
RB	7	(Chile) Tomás Asta-Buruaga
CB	2	(Chile) Gustavo Lanaro	(substituted off) 77'
CB	5	(Chile) Valber Huerta
LB	24	(Chile) Alfonso Parot
CM	8	(Chile) Ignacio Saavedra
CM	11	(Argentina) Luciano Aued	(substituted off) 77'
AM	22	(Chile) Juan Leiva	(yellow card) 43' (yellow-red card) 88'
RW	30	(Chile) Diego Valencia	(yellow card) 39'
LW	16	(Chile) Clemente Montes	(substituted off) 57'
CF	9	(Argentina) Fernando Zampedri	(yellow card) 90+6'
Substitutes:
GK	28	(Chile) Vicente Bernedo
DF	3	(Chile) Cristóbal Finch
DF	17	(Chile) Branco Ampuero	(substituted on) 77'
DF	23	(Chile) Juan Cornejo
MF	18	(Argentina) Diego Buonanotte	(substituted on) 77'
MF	26	(Chile) Marcelino Núñez	(substituted on) 57'
FW	27	(Chile) Alexander Aravena
Manager:
(Argentina) Cristian Paulucci

GK	1	(Uruguay) Nicola Pérez
RB	18	(Chile) Bernardo Cerezo
CB	5	(Chile) Rafael Caroca
CB	8	(Chile) Nicolás Vargas	(yellow card) 45+1'
LB	14	(Chile) Jovany Campusano	(yellow card) 39'
RM	11	(Chile) Fernando Cordero	(substituted off) 78'
CM	20	(Argentina) Federico Mateos
CM	28	(Chile) Manuel Rivera
LM	30	(Argentina) Matías Moya	(substituted off) 84'
CF	29	(Argentina) Maximiliano Quinteros	(yellow card) 24'	(substituted off) 60'
CF	9	(Chile) Nicolás Guerra
Substitutes:
GK	25	(Chile) Hernán Muñoz
DF	4	(Chile) José Navarrete	(substituted on) 84'
DF	6	(Chile) Sebastián Contreras
MF	13	(Chile) Walter Martínez
MF	21	(Chile) Joe Abrigo	(substituted on) 60'
FW	22	(Chile) Roberto Gutiérrez	(substituted on) 78'
FW	37	(Chile) Maximiliano Torrealba
Manager:
(Chile) Jaime García

Assistant referees:
Christian Schiemann
Claudio Urrutia
Fourth official:
Cristian Garay
Video assistant referee:
Juan Lara
Assistant video assistant referee:
Manuel Vergara

Match rules

- 90 minutes.
- Penalty shoot-out if scores still level.
- Seven named substitutes.
- Maximum of five substitutions.
