= 1993 in association football =

The following are the association football events of the year 1993 throughout the world.

== Events ==
- 27 April – A Zambian Air Force aircraft carrying most of the Zambia national football team crashes off Libreville, Gabon, killing all 30 people on board.
- 15 May – The inauguration match of J. League, Verdy Kawasaki vs Yokohama Marinos is held at the National Stadium of Japan.
- 20 May – In France, start the "Affair OM-VA" corruption scandal by Marseille and Valenciennes. One week later, on 26 May, Marseille's squad win the UEFA Champions League defeating AC Milan 1–0 at the Olympiastadion in Munich. On 29 May, Marseille win the French league, but are stripped of the title by the French Football Federation on 22 September, with no winner assigned. In October/November the France national football team fail to qualify for the 1994 World Cup after losses to Israel and Bulgaria.
- 20 May – Arsenal defeats Sheffield Wednesday 2–1 in the replay to claim the FA Cup.
- 26 May – Copa Libertadores won by São Paulo FC after defeating Club Deportivo Universidad Católica on an aggregate score, 5–3.
- 8 August – Ajax wins the Dutch Super Cup, the annual opening of the new season in the Eredivisie, by a 4–0 win over Feyenoord.
- 5 September – Colombia national football team pull one of the largest upsets in football by defeating Argentina national football team 5–0 in Buenos Aires, Argentina.
- 12 December – São Paulo FC once again wins the Intercontinental Cup in Tokyo, Japan, this time by defeating Italy's AC Milan, 3–2. The winning goal for the Brazilians is scored by Müller in the 86th minute. European Cup winners Olympique Marseille (France) were suspended due to a bribery scandal in the French Championship and were replaced by runners-up Milan.

== Winners club national tournaments ==
=== Africa ===
- Egypt – Zamalek

=== Asia ===
- Japan – Verdy Kawasaki
- Qatar – Al-Arabi
- South Korea – Ilhwa Chunma

=== Europe ===
- Albania – Partizani Tiranë
- Austria – Austria Vienna
- Belgium – Anderlecht
- Bulgaria – Levski Sofia
- Croatia – Croatia Zagreb
- Cyprus – Omonia Nicosia
- Czechoslovakia – Sparta Prague
- Denmark – FC Copenhagen
- England – Manchester United
- Estonia – FC Norma Tallinn
- Finland – Jazz Pori
- France – No title awarded (Marseille stripped of title due to a corruption scandal)
- Germany – Werder Bremen
- Italy – AC Milan
- Netherlands – Feyenoord
- Portugal – FC Porto
- Scotland – Rangers
- Spain – FC Barcelona
- Sweden – IFK Gothenburg
- Switzerland – FC Aarau
- Turkey – Galatasaray
- Yugoslavia – Partizan

=== Central America ===
- Costa Rica – CS Herediano

=== North America ===
- Mexico – Atlante
- United States / Canada – Colorado Foxes (APSL)

=== South America ===
- Argentina
  - Clausura: Vélez Sársfield
  - Apertura: River Plate
- Bolivia – The Strongest
- Brazil – Palmeiras
- Chile – Colo Colo
- Colombia – Atlético Junior
- Ecuador – Club Sport Emelec
- Paraguay – Olimpia Asunción

== International tournaments ==
- Baltic Cup in Pärnu, Estonia
  1. Latvia
  2. Estonia
  3. Lithuania
- CONCACAF Gold Cup in Dallas, United States and Mexico City, Mexico
  1. Mexico
  2. United States
  3. Costa Rica
- Copa América in Ecuador
  1. Argentina
  2. Mexico
  3. Colombia
- UNCAF Nations Cup in Tegucigalpa, Honduras
  1. Honduras
  2. Costa Rica
  3. Panama
- 1993 FIFA World Youth Championship in Australia
  1. Brazil
  2. Ghana
  3. England
- FIFA U-17 World Championship in Japan
  1. Nigeria
  2. Ghana
  3. Chile

== Births ==
=== January ===
- 1 January: Jon Flanagan, English footballer
- 4 January: Vladyslav Kalitvintsev, Ukrainian footballer
- 7 January: Jan Oblak, Slovenian footballer
- 8 January: Lina Lundqvist, Swedish footballer
- 14 January:
  - Daniel Bessa, Italian-Brazilian junior international
  - Juanjo Muko Nsue, Equatoguinean footballer
- 15 January: Niko Kata, Spanish-born Equatoguinean international
- 16 January: Pedro Oliveira, Portuguese footballer
- 19 January: Mike Thalassitis, English-Cypriot footballer and television personality (d. 2019)
- 20 January: Elin Wahlström, Swedish footballer
- 25 January: Kasper Larsen, Danish footballer

=== February ===
- 2 February: Ravel Morrison, British-born Jamaican footballer
- 5 February: Gerard Bieszczad, Polish footballer
- 7 February: Diego Laxalt, Uruguayan footballer
- 9 February:
  - Niclas Füllkrug, German footballer
  - Matthew Rowell, South African footballer
- 15 February: Geoffrey Kondogbia, French-Central African footballer
- 17 February: Nicola Leali, Italian youth international
- 19 February: Mauro Icardi, Argentine footballer
- 28 February: Éder Álvarez Balanta, Colombian international footballer

=== March ===
- 1 March: Josh McEachran, English junior international
- 3 March: Antonio Rüdiger, German footballer
- 5 March: Gilbrano Plet, Dutch footballer
- 7 March
  - Leonid Akulinin, Ukrainian footballer
  - Sultan Al-Deayea, Saudi Arabian footballer
  - Diego Chávez, Peruvian footballer
  - Mary Earps, British footballer
  - Vinícius Freitas, Brazilian footballer
  - João Tiago Serrão Garcês, Portuguese footballer
  - Gilberto, Brazilian footballer
  - Óscar Ignacio Hernández, Chilean footballer
  - Saad Hussain, Qatari footballer
  - Jackson Irvine, Australian footballer
  - Anton Kotlyar, Ukrainian footballer
  - Santy Ngom, Senegalese footballer
  - Mohamed Ouattara, Burkinabé footballer
  - Shawn Parker, German footballer
  - Robbie Thomson, Scottish footballer
- 9 March: Larnell Cole, English footballer
- 15 March – Papa Alassane Ndiaye, Senegalese footballer
- 19 March
  - Mateusz Szwoch, Polish midfielder
  - Hakim Ziyech, Moroccan and Dutch international
- 25 March – Anna Hjälmkvist, Swedish footballer
- 26 March – Sara Nordin, Swedish footballer
- 28 March – Fran Zafra, Spanish footballer
- 31 March – Connor Wickham, English footballer

=== April ===
- 1 April: Andy Brennan, Australian footballer
- 4 April: Hugo Aquino, Paraguayan footballer
- 11 April: Yuji Takahashi, Japanese footballer
- 15 April: Appolinaire Danvidé, Beninese footballer
- 19 April: Lia Wälti, Swiss footballer
- 25 April: Raphaël Varane, French footballer

=== May ===
- 5 May: Andrzej Sobieszczyk, Polish footballer
- 7 May: Lampros Tairis, Greek footballer
- 13 May: Romelu Lukaku, Belgian footballer
- 18 May: Taulant Kadrija, Slovenian footballer
- 20 May
  - Juanmi, Spanish international
  - Marcel Mosch, German footballer
- 25 May: Andrés Felipe Roa, Colombian international
- 26 May:
  - Juan Cifré, Spanish footballer
  - Kendra McMullan, Northern Irish former footballer
- 27 May: Mikel Agu, Nigerian international

=== June ===
- 5 June: Juraj Maretić, Croatian footballer
- 11 June: Ciara Grant, Irish footballer
- 13 June:
  - Thomas Partey, Ghanaian footballer
  - Valkenedy, Brazilian footballer

=== July ===
- 1 July: Mirza Jatić, Austrian footballer
- 5 July: Mehdi Tarfi, Belgian footballer
- 8 July: Shahrul Saad, Malaysian footballer
- 10 July: Tiago Ferreira, Portuguese footballer
- 13 July: Dan Bentley, English footballer
- 15 July: Ömer Arslan, Turkish footballer
- 18 July: Nabil Fekir, French footballer
- 22 July: Juan Manuel Solano, Colombian footballer
- 27 July:
  - Omer Atzili, Israeli footballer
  - Max Power, English footballer
- 28 July: Harry Kane, English footballer

=== August ===
- 3 August: Isaac Oliseh, Nigerian footballer
- 4 August
  - Saido Berahino, English-Burundian footballer
  - Giovanni Di Lorenzo, Italian footballer
- 11 August: Albin Nilsson, Swedish footballer
- 12 August: Sarah Bergman, Swedish footballer
- 20 August: Mario Jelavic, Croatian junior international
- 30 August: Paco Alcácer, Spanish international
- 31 August: Pablo Marí, Spanish club footballer

=== September ===
- 1 September: Mario Lemina, Gabonese–French footballer
- 4 September: Yannick Carrasco, Belgian footballer
- 27 September: Lisandro Magallán, Argentine footballer

=== October ===
- 6 October: Joe Rafferty, English-born Irish footballer
- 8 October: Gullithi (Rudigullithi da Silva Henrique), Brazilian footballer
- 8 October: Nils Gottschick, German footballer
- 10 October: Nuha Barrow, Gambian international footballer
- 11 October: Arkane Mohamed, Comorian international footballer
- 22 October: Martina Smilkovska, Macedonian footballer
- 23 October: Fabinho, Brazilian footballer
- 31 October: Kelvin Ebuka Nwamora, Nigerian footballer

=== November ===
- 7 November: Fahardine Hassani, Comorian footballer
- 15 November: Paulo Dybala, Argentine footballer
- 16 November: Nelson Semedo, Portuguese footballer
- 23 November: Hemiliano (Hemiliano Gomes Lopes), Bissau-Guinean footballer

=== December ===
- 18 December: Steve Glodjinon, Beninese international footballer

== Deaths ==
=== January ===
- 9 January – Mario Genta, Italian midfielder, winner of the 1938 FIFA World Cup. (80)
- 13 January – Edivaldo, Brazilian forward, Brazilian squad member at the 1986 FIFA World Cup and active player of Clube Atlético Taquaritinga . (30; car crash)

=== February ===
- 11 February – Félix Ruiz (52), Spanish footballer
- 21 February – Felice Borel, Italian forward, winner of the 1934 FIFA World Cup and topscorer of the 1932–33 Serie A and 1933–34 Serie A. (78)

=== March ===
- 15 March – Karl Mai, West-German midfielder, winner of the 1954 FIFA World Cup. (64)

=== April ===
- 30 April – Mario Evaristo, Argentine midfielder, runner up of the 1930 FIFA World Cup, part of the first sibling to play in a World Cup Final. (84)

=== May ===
- 6 May – Rommel Fernandez (27), Panamanian footballer
- 28 May – Ugo Locatelli, Italian midfielder, winner of the 1938 FIFA World Cup. (77)

=== October ===
- 4 October - Jim Holton (43), Scottish international footballer
- 14 October – Harald Hennum (65), Norwegian footballer

=== November ===
- 26 November - Guido Masetti, Italian goalkeeper, winner of the 1934 FIFA World Cup and 1938 FIFA World Cup. (86)

=== December ===
- 26 December – Carlos Antonio Muñoz (29), Ecuadorian footballer
