= De Gregorio =

De Gregorio, DeGregorio, Di Gregorio and DiGregorio are surnames. Note that in some entries listed below, Gregorio is considered the surname. People so named include:

== People ==
- Alexandre Di Gregorio (born 1980), Belgian footballer
- Baldo di Gregorio (born 1984), German football manager and player
- Diego de Gregorio (born 1986), Chilean footballer
- Emanuele Di Gregorio (born 1980), Italian sprinter
- Emmanuele de Gregorio (1758–1839), Italian Catholic cardinal, son of Leopoldo de Gregorio
- Ernie DiGregorio (born 1951), American former National Basketball Association player
- Gaspar DiGregorio (1905–1970), New York mobster
- Gianni Di Gregorio (born 1949), Italian director, screenwriter and actor
- Giovanni De Gregorio (1579 or 1580–1656), better known as il Pietrafesa, painter from Satriano di Lucania
- Javier di Gregorio (born 1977), Chilean football goalkeeper
- Jerry DeGregorio (born 1962), American basketball coach
- Joel DiGregorio (1944–2011), keyboardist for the Charlie Daniels Band
- José de Gregorio (born 1959), Chilean economist, Governor of the Central Bank of Chile from 2007 to 2011
- Leoncio Alonso González de Gregorio, 22nd Duke of Medina Sidonia (born 1956), Spanish historian
- Leopoldo de Gregorio, Marquis of Squillace (1699–1785), Italian statesman, minister of King Charles III of Spain
- Marco de Gregorio (1829–1876), Italian painter
- Matías Di Gregorio (born 1986), Argentine footballer
- Michael DiGregorio (born 1990), Filipino-Italian Philippine Basketball Association player
- Michele Di Gregorio (born 1997), Italian footballer
- Pascual de Gregorio (born 1972), Chilean football manager and former player, older brother of Diego de Gregorio
- Pilar González de Gregorio (born 1957), Spanish socialite, sister of the 22nd Duke of Medina Sidonia
- Raf de Gregorio (born 1977), New Zealand footballer
- Rémy Di Gregorio (born 1985), French road bicycle racer
- Ron DeGregorio, American ice hockey executive, president of USA Hockey from 2003 to 2015
- Sergio De Gregorio (disambiguation), several people

== Fictional characters ==
- Charlene "Cha Cha" DiGregorio, in the musical Grease

== See also ==
- Palazzo Di Gregorio, a building in Alcamo, Sicily
