= 2011 UEMOA Tournament squads =

== Benin ==
| No. | Pos. | Player | Date of birth (age) | Caps | Club |
|---|---|---|---|---|---|
| | GK | Saturnin Allagbé | | | (Benin) Aspac |
| | GK | Ludovic Alla | | | (Benin) Mambas |
| | GK | Valère Amoussou | | | (Benin) Mogas |
| | DF | Salomon Junior | | | (Benin) |
| | DF | Lazadi Fousseni | | | (Benin) |
| | DF | Afissou Fayemi | | | (Benin) |
| | DF | Vincent Fanou | | | (Benin) Aspac |
| | DF | Séidou Barazé | | | (Benin) Tonnerre |
| | DF | Guy Akpagba | | | (Benin) Dragons |
| | DF | Mama Séibou | | | (Benin) Cifas |
| | DF | Fabrice Gozo | | | (Benin) 11 Créateurs |
| | DF | Nabil Yarou | | | (Benin) Tanékas |
| | MF | Djamal Fassassi | | | (Benin) |
| | MF | Cédric Coréa | | | (Benin) |
| | MF | Alain Hounsa | | | (Benin) Us Kraké |
| | MF | Djibril Naim | | | (Benin) Cifas |
| | MF | Jordel Dossou | | | (Benin) Cifas |
| | FW | Jacques Bessan | | | (Benin) |
| | FW | Isac Louté | | | (Benin) Soleil |
| | FW | Lanignan Gbingan | | | (Benin) Avrankou |

== Burkina Faso ==
| No. | Pos. | Player | Date of birth (age) | Caps | Club |
|---|---|---|---|---|---|
| | | Alain Minoungou | | | (Burkina Faso) |
| | | Dramane Nikiema | | | (Burkina Faso) |
| | | Moussa Yedan | | | (Burkina Faso) |
| | | Eric Soulama D. | | | (Burkina Faso) |
| | | Ibrahim Sakande | | | (Burkina Faso) |
| | | Gabriel P. G. Kabore | | | (Burkina Faso) |
| | | Assamy Ouedraogo | | | (Burkina Faso) |
| | | Aly Zoungrana | | | (Burkina Faso) |
| | | Issa Gouo | | | (Burkina Faso) |
| | | Wasiyou Ishola | | | (Burkina Faso) |
| | | Nii Adamah Plange | | | (Burkina Faso) |
| | | Mandela Ocansey | | | (Burkina Faso) |
| | | Basile Sam | | | (Burkina Faso) |
| | | André Yameogo | | | (Burkina Faso) |
| | | Ismaël Ouedraogo | | | (Burkina Faso) |
| | | Martin Kafando | | | (Burkina Faso) |
| | | Ernest Yelemou | | | (Burkina Faso) |
| | | Idrissa Diakite | | | (Burkina Faso) |
| | | Yacouba Ouedraogo | | | (Burkina Faso) |
| | | Seulau Sanou | | | (Burkina Faso) |
| | | Moussa Fofana | | | (Burkina Faso) |
| | | Adama Diabate | | | (Burkina Faso) |
| | | Hiliasse Tiendrebeogo | | | (Burkina Faso) |
| | | Issouf Kabore | | | (Burkina Faso) |
| | | Pierre Cala | | | (Burkina Faso) |
| | | Roger Nikiema | | | (Burkina Faso) |
| | | Aboubacar Jean Zerbo | | | (Burkina Faso) |
| | | Aziz Guelbeogo | | | (Burkina Faso) |

== Ivory Coast ==
| No. | Pos. | Player | Date of birth (age) | Caps | Club |
|---|---|---|---|---|---|
| | | Badra Ali Sangare | | | (Ivory Coast) |
| | | Moussa Sanogo | | | (Ivory Coast) |
| | | Mahan Marc Goua | | | (Ivory Coast) |
| | | Hamed Herve Diomande | | | (Ivory Coast) |
| | | Nicaise N’Goran | | | (Ivory Coast) |
| | | Boris Kadjo | | | (Ivory Coast) |
| | | Ibrahim Kone | | | (Ivory Coast) |
| | | Ruffin N’Gouan | | | (Ivory Coast) |
| | | Kaloulou Sylla | | | (Ivory Coast) |
| | | Desire Magloire Kouame | | | (Ivory Coast) |
| | | Fousseny Coulibaly | | | (Ivory Coast) |
| | | Arsene Adon | | | (Ivory Coast) |
| | | Bobley Anderson Allegne | | | (Ivory Coast) |
| | | Adou Koffi | | | (Ivory Coast) |
| | | Yannick Zakri | | | (Ivory Coast) |
| | | Inza Diabate | | | (Ivory Coast) |
| | | Bakary Kone | | | (Ivory Coast) |
| | | Alain Tano | | | (Ivory Coast) |
| | | Georges Griffith | | | (Ivory Coast) |
| | | Kevin Zougoula | | | (Ivory Coast) |

== Guinea-Bissau ==
| No. | Pos. | Player | Date of birth (age) | Caps | Club |
|---|---|---|---|---|---|
| | | Saido Djassi | | | (Guinea-Bissau) |
| | | Juvenal Correia | | | (Guinea-Bissau) |
| | | Herculano Co | | | (Guinea-Bissau) |
| | | Serifo Mane | | | (Guinea-Bissau) |
| | | Alberto Quintinque Co | | | (Guinea-Bissau) |
| | | Joao Biquel Junios | | | (Guinea-Bissau) |
| | | David Alves | | | (Guinea-Bissau) |
| | | Valdir R. Indeque | | | (Guinea-Bissau) |
| | | Muller A. Nhaga Da Silva | | | (Guinea-Bissau) |
| | | Albino Dolle Junior | | | (Guinea-Bissau) |
| | | Suleimane Gomes De Pina | | | (Guinea-Bissau) |
| | | Bubacar Djalo | | | (Guinea-Bissau) |
| | | Pelson Luis Co | | | (Guinea-Bissau) |
| | | Amadu Darame | | | (Guinea-Bissau) |
| | | Mirobaldo S. W. Bamba | | | (Guinea-Bissau) |
| | | Mutaro Embalo | | | (Guinea-Bissau) |
| | | Dauda Ba | | | (Guinea-Bissau) |
| | | Hemiliano Gomes Lopes | | | (Guinea-Bissau) |
| | | Elizeu A. S. Nosolini | | | (Guinea-Bissau) |
| | | Abulai Thiam | | | (Guinea-Bissau) |

== Mali ==
| No. | Pos. | Player | Date of birth (age) | Caps | Club |
|---|---|---|---|---|---|
| | | Soumaïla Diakite | | | (Mali) |
| | | Ibrahim B. Mounkoro | | | (Mali) |
| | | Cheick O. Ballo | | | (Mali) |
| | | Boubacar Dembele | | | (Mali) |
| | | Amara Konate | | | (Mali) |
| | | Moussa Coulibaly | | | (Mali) |
| | | Ousmane Diarra | | | (Mali) |
| | | Salif Coulibaly | | | (Mali) |
| | | Mohamed O. Konate | | | (Mali) |
| | | Cheick Tidiane Berthe | | | (Mali) |
| | | Adama Kamissoko | | | (Mali) |
| | | Moussa Coulibaly | | | (Mali) |
| | | Moussa Kone | | | (Mali) |
| | | Amadou Diallo | | | (Mali) |
| | | Aboubacar Sissoko | | | (Mali) |
| | | Idrissa Laïc Traore | | | (Mali) |
| | | Souleymane Dembele | | | (Mali) |
| | | Boucader Fomba | | | (Mali) |
| | | Ibrahim K. Diakite | | | (Mali) |
| | | Moussa Guindo | | | (Mali) |

== Niger ==
| No. | Pos. | Player | Date of birth (age) | Caps | Club |
|---|---|---|---|---|---|
| | | Rabo Saminou | | | (Niger) |
| | | Alzouma Moussa | | | (Niger) |
| | | Moussa Mo | | | (Niger) |
| | | Laouali Idrissa | | | (Niger) |
| | | Sahadou Yattaga | | | (Niger) |
| | | Suraju Mohamadou | | | (Niger) |
| | | Soumaila Mohamed | | | (Niger) |
| | | Issiakou Koudize | | | (Niger) |
| | | Ibrahim Adamou | | | (Niger) |
| | | Mossi Moussa | | | (Niger) |
| | | Noga Abdoubacar Dialiga | | | (Niger) |
| | | Nomao Nasser | | | (Niger) |
| | | Cocu Alexandre | | | (Niger) |
| | | Bachir Konate | | | (Niger) |
| | | Tinni Ibrahim | | | (Niger) |
| | | Ousmane Abdoulaye | | | (Niger) |
| | | Ali Yacouba | | | (Niger) |
| | | Garba Halidou | | | (Niger) |
| | | Mohamed Moustapha | | | (Niger) |

== Senegal ==
| No. | Pos. | Player | Date of birth (age) | Caps | Club |
|---|---|---|---|---|---|
| | | Khadim Ndiaye | | | (Senegal) Linguère de St-Louis |
| | | Pape Latyr Ndiaye | | | (Senegal) US Ouakam |
| | | Ousmane Mane | | | (Senegal) Diambars |
| | | Ass Mandaw Sy | | | (Senegal) NGB Niary Tally |
| | | Mamadou Sylla | | | (Senegal) US Ouakam |
| | | Mame Saher Thioune | | | (Senegal) Casa Sport |
| | | El Hadji Sady Gueye | | | (Senegal) Diambars |
| | | Mor Soumare | | | (Senegal) Jaraaf de Dakar |
| | | Mamanding Kidiera | | | (Senegal) Casa Sport |
| | | Khassim Soumare | | | (Senegal) Diambars |
| | | Abdourahmane Diop | | | (Senegal) US Gorée |
| | | Omar Balde | | | (Senegal) Yeggo |
| | | Yaya Sonko | | | (Senegal) Casa Sport |
| | | Issa Sarr | | | (Senegal) Jaraaf de Dakar |
| | | Dominique Gomis | | | (Senegal) Jaraaf de Dakar |
| | | Dame Diop | | | (Senegal) Touré Kunda |
| | | Moustapha Kasse | | | (Senegal) NGB Niary Tally |
| | | Sephane Badji | | | (Senegal) Casa Sport |
| | | Emmanuel Gomis | | | (Senegal) Diambars |
| | | Adama Mbaye | | | (Senegal) AS Pikine |
| | | Ibou Cisse | | | (Senegal) Jaraaf de Dakar |
| | | Alboury Fall | | | (Senegal) Yeggo |
| | | Pape Ciré Dia | | | (Senegal) Jaraaf de Dakar |
| | | Alassane Diallo | | | (Senegal) US Gorée |
| | | Mohamed Niang Diop | | | (Senegal) NGB Niary Tally |
| | | Emile Paul Tendeng | | | (Senegal) Casa Sport |
| | | Aliou Coly | | | (Senegal) Casa Sport |
| | FW | Oumar Niasse | 18 April 1990 (aged 21) | | (Senegal) US Ouakam |
| | | Assane Drame | | | (Senegal) Casa Sport |
| | | Abdoulaye Toure | | | (Senegal) Dakar UC |
| | | Moustapha Mendy | | | (Senegal) Guédiawaye |
| | | Yanick Gomis | | | (Senegal) Olympique de Ngor |
| | | Famara Mane | | | (Senegal) Dakar UC |

== Togo ==
| No. | Pos. | Player | Date of birth (age) | Caps | Club |
|---|---|---|---|---|---|
| | | Mawugbé Atsu | | | (Togo) Maranatha |
| | | N'Souhoho Mensah | | | (Togo) Dyto |
| | | Laomey Léonce | | | (Togo) AS Douanes |
| | | Ayara Samudini | | | (Togo) Okiti |
| | | Dadzie Kodjo | | | (Togo) Gomido |
| | | Tawali Magnima | | | (Togo) Gomiido |
| | | Kinvi-Boh Alex | | | (Togo) Gomido |
| | | Donou Kokou | | | (Togo) Maranatha |
| | | Mamah Aziz | | | (Togo) Liberty FC |
| | | Zangaba Abass | | | (Togo) AS Douanes |
| | | Ametepe Kodjo | | | (Togo) Maranatha |
| | | Segbefia Alikem | | | (Togo) Gomido |
| | | Ayoade-Davids Laide | | | (Togo) Semassi |
| | | Amegnaglo Thomas | | | (Togo) AS Douanes |
| | | Gado Rachide | | | (Togo) Semassi |
| | | Dodja Fataou | | | (Togo) Gomido |
| | | Kondo Arimiaou | | | (Togo) Okiti |
| | | Guedje Cyril | | | (Togo) Anges de Notsè |
| | | Ibrahim Abdoulaye | | | (Togo) Dyto |
| | | Salami Wassiou | | | (Togo) Dyto |
