= Juanjo =

Juanjo is a common Spanish contraction of Juan José and may refer to:

- Juanjo (futsal player) (Juan José Angosto) (b. 1985), Spanish futsal player
- Juanjo (footballer, born 1987) (Juan José García Martínez) (b. 1987), known as "Juanjo", Spanish footballer
- Juanjo Bezares (Juan José Bezares Alarcón) (b. 1981), a Spanish footballer
- Juanjo Camacho (b. 1980), Spanish footballer
- Juanjo (footballer, born 1977) (Juanjo Carricondo) (b. 1977), Spanish footballer
- Juanjo Ciércoles (b. 1988), a Spanish footballer
- Juanjo Díaz (b. 1949), a Spanish football manager
- Juanjo Domínguez (b. 1951), an Argentinian guitarist
- Juanjo Enríquez (1950–2015), known as "Juanjo", a Spanish retired footballer and manager
- Juanjo (footballer, born 1985) (Juanjo Expósito) (b. 1985), known as "Juanjo", a Spanish footballer
- Juanjo González (b. 1973), known as "Juanjo", a Spanish retired footballer
- Juanjo Mena (b. 1965), a Spanish conductor
- Juanjo Muko (b. 1993), an Equatoguinean footballer
- Juanjo Menéndez (1929–2003) was a Spanish actor
- Juanjo Nieto (Juan José Nieto Zarzoso) (b. 1994), a Spanish footballer
- Juanjo Pereira (Juan José Pereira Zambrano) (b. 1984), a Spanish footballer
- Juanjo Puigcorbé (b. 1955), a Spanish actor
- Juanjo Valencia (Juan José Valencia), a Spanish retired footballer
