= 2012–13 Copa Chile =

Tournament details
- Country: Chile
- Teams: 46

Final positions
- Champions: Universidad de Chile
- Runners-up: Universidad Católica

Tournament statistics
- Top goal scorer(s): Matías Donoso, Diego de Gregorio (8 goals)

The 2012–13 Copa Chile, (officially known as Copa Chile MTS 2012/13 because of its sponsorship), is the 33rd edition of the Copa Chile, the country's national cup tournament. The competition started on June 23, 2012, with the First Round and concludes on May 8, 2013, with the Final. The winner qualifies for the 2013 Copa Sudamericana.

== Schedule ==
Round	Date
First Round	June 23, 2012; July 11, 2012
Second Round	August 8, 2012; October 29, 2012
Third Round	October 31, 2012; December 2, 2012
Quarterfinals	January 19, 2013; January 30, 2013
Semifinals	March 27, 2013; April 17, 2013
Final	May 8, 2013

== Teams ==
A total 46 clubs were accepted for the competition. The teams for this edition are the teams from the Primera División, Primera B, Segunda División, and selected Tercera División teams.

=== Primera División ===
- Antofagasta
- Cobreloa
- Cobresal
- Iquique
- La Serena
- Unión San Felipe
- Unión La Calera
- Santiago Wanderers
- Universidad Católica
- Unión Española
- Universidad de Chile
- Colo-Colo
- Palestino
- Audax Italiano
- O'Higgins
- Rangers
- Huachipato
- Universidad de Concepción

=== Primera B ===
- San Marcos de Arica
- Coquimbo Unido
- San Luis
- Everton
- Magallanes
- Barnechea
- Santiago Morning
- Curicó Unido
- Ñublense
- Naval
- Deportes Concepción
- Lota Schwager
- Unión Temuco
- Puerto Montt

=== Segunda División ===
- Copiapó
- Melipilla
- Fernández Vial
- Iberia
- Temuco
- Provincial Osorno

=== Tercera División ===
- Trasandino
- Deportes Quilicura
- Provincial Talagante
- San Antonio Unido
- Enfoque de Rancagua
- Colchagua
- Linares
- Valdivia

== First round ==
This round comprised the 2012 Primera B teams, 6 Segunda División and 8 Tercera División teams.

Team 1	Agg.	Team 2	1st leg	2nd leg
Trasandino	3–2	San Luis	2–2	1–0
Deportes Quilicura	0–6	Magallanes	0–2	0-4
Colchagua	3–0	Curicó Unido	3–0	0–0
Provincial Talagante	6–6 (1-3p)	San Marcos de Arica	1–2	5–4
Linares	2–4	Ñublense	1–1	1–3
Fernández Vial	1–4	Concepción	1–0	0–4
Valdivia	2–3	Lota Schwager	0–2	2–1
Provincial Osorno	2–3	Puerto Montt	1–0	1–3
Temuco	1–1 (8-9p)	Unión Temuco	1–0	0–1
Copiapó	2–6	Coquimbo Unido	0–3	2–3
Enfoque de Rancagua	3–6	Barnechea	1–3	2–3
Melipilla	3–7	Santiago Morning	0–4	3–3
Iberia	5–2	Naval	2–1	3–1
San Antonio Unido	4–3	Everton	4–1	0–2

== Second round ==
The Second Round marks the beginning of the competition for Primera División teams. This round comprised the winners of the First Round and the 2012 Primera División teams. Every team plays home and away against every other team in its group. The best 2 teams from each group advance to the next round.

=== Group 1 ===
Team	Pld	W	D	L	GF	GA	GD	Pts	UTEM	UCON	DPMO	IBER
Unión Temuco	6	3	2	1	14	8	+6	11		1–1	2–1	5–2
Universidad de Concepción	6	3	2	1	10	7	+3	11	2–0		1–2	4–3
Deportes Puerto Montt	6	2	2	2	9	9	0	8	1–1	1–1		2–1
Iberia	6	1	0	5	10	19	−9	3	1–5	0–1	3–2	

Legend: Blue = home team win; Yellow = draw; Red = away team win.

=== Group 2 ===
Team	Pld	W	D	L	GF	GA	GD	Pts	HUAC	LSCH	ÑUBL	DCON
Huachipato	6	5	0	1	15	2	+13	15		3–0	3–1	2–0
Lota Schwager	6	2	2	2	5	7	−2	8	1–0		1–0	1–2
Ñublense	6	2	1	3	6	8	−2	7	0–2	1–1		2–1
Deportes Concepción	6	1	1	4	4	13	−9	4	0–5	1–1	0–2	

Legend: Blue = home team win; Yellow = draw; Red = away team win.

=== Group 3 ===
Team	Pld	W	D	L	GF	GA	GD	Pts	OHIG	RANG	DCOL	SANU
O'Higgins	6	4	1	1	15	4	+11	13		0–1	1–1	7–0
Rangers	6	3	1	2	8	7	+1	10	1–3		1–1	3–1
Deportes Colchagua	6	2	3	1	7	5	+2	9	0–2	2–0		2–0
San Antonio Unido	6	0	1	5	3	17	−14	1	1–2	0–2	1–1	

Legend: Blue = home team win; Yellow = draw; Red = away team win.

=== Group 4 ===
Team	Pld	W	D	L	GF	GA	GD	Pts	UESP	UCAT	MAGA	AUDI
Unión Española	6	5	1	0	19	4	+15	16		6–1	4–0	2–0
Universidad Católica	6	3	0	3	12	12	0	9	1–2		4–1	3–2
Deportes Magallanes	6	1	3	2	9	15	−6	6	2–2	1–0		2–2
Audax Italiano	6	0	2	4	7	16	−9	2	0–3	0–3	3–3	

Legend: Blue = home team win; Yellow = draw; Red = away team win.

=== Group 5 ===
Team	Pld	W	D	L	GF	GA	GD	Pts	COLO	PALE	BARN	USFE
Colo-Colo	6	3	1	2	17	8	+9	10		3–0	5–5	4–0
Palestino	6	3	1	2	11	12	−1	10	1–0		2–4	4–2
Barnechea	6	2	2	2	17	16	+1	8	2–1	2–3		3–2
Unión San Felipe	6	1	2	3	8	17	−9	5	0–4	1–1	2–1	

Legend: Blue = home team win; Yellow = draw; Red = away team win.

=== Group 6 ===
Team	Pld	W	D	L	GF	GA	GD	Pts	SMOR	UCHI	ULCA	SWAN
Santiago Morning	6	3	2	1	10	11	−1	11		0–5	2–1	2–0
Universidad de Chile	6	2	3	1	15	8	+7	9	3–3		1–2	2–2
Unión La Calera	6	2	2	2	6	8	−2	8	1–1	0–0		2–1
Santiago Wanderers	6	1	1	4	8	12	−4	4	1–2	1–4	3–0	

Legend: Blue = home team win; Yellow = draw; Red = away team win.

=== Group 7 ===
Team	Pld	W	D	L	GF	GA	GD	Pts	TRAS	COQU	DLSE	CSAL
Trasandino	6	4	1	1	9	7	+2	13		2–0	3–2	2–1
Coquimbo Unido	6	2	2	2	8	9	−1	8	1–1		1–0	3–2
Deportes La Serena	6	2	1	3	11	9	+2	7	3–0	2–2		3–1
Cobresal	6	2	0	4	8	11	−3	6	0–1	2–1	2–1	

Legend: Blue = home team win; Yellow = draw; Red = away team win.

=== Group 8 ===
Team	Pld	W	D	L	GF	GA	GD	Pts	CLOA	SMAR	DANT	DIQU
Cobreloa	6	3	2	1	10	5	+5	11		3–1	0–0	2–0
San Marcos de Arica	6	3	2	1	14	11	+3	11	2–1		2–2	2–1
Deportes Antofagasta	6	2	2	2	10	11	−1	8	0–2	1–4		4–1
Deportes Iquique	6	0	2	4	9	16	−7	2	2–2	3–3	2–3	

Legend: Blue = home team win; Yellow = draw; Red = away team win.

== Third round ==
Team 1	Agg.	Team 2	1st leg	2nd leg
Universidad Católica	3–2	Santiago Morning	2–1	1–1
Lota Schwager	1–3	Rangers	1–0	0–3
San Marcos de Arica	2–3	Cobreloa	1–1	1–2
Huachipato	1–4	Unión Temuco	0–0	1–4
Coquimbo Unido	8–2	Palestino	5–1	3–1
Trasandino	2–5	Unión Española	2–2	0–3
Colo-Colo	4–6	O'Higgins	3–1	1–5
Universidad de Chile	6–1	Universidad de Concepción	3–0	3–1

== Quarterfinals ==
Team 1	Agg.	Team 2	1st leg	2nd leg
Coquimbo Unido	3–11	Universidad Católica	2–4	1–7
Unión Temuco	0–5	Universidad de Chile	0–3	0–2
Cobreloa	4–3	O'Higgins	2–1	2–2
Unión Española	5–2	Rangers	3–0	2–2

24 January 2013
22:00
1st Leg

Coquimbo Unido	2–4	Universidad Católica
Pierani 17'; Muñoz 90+1'	Report	Cordero 24'; Peralta 37'; Sosa 52'; Fernández 86'

Estadio Francisco Sánchez Rumoroso, Coquimbo
Attendance: 6,750
Referee: José Campusano
30 January 2013
20:00
2nd Leg

Universidad Católica	7–1	Coquimbo Unido
Mier 8', 89'; Martínez 21', 56'; Á. Ramos 28', 83'; Ríos 51' (pen.)	Report	Pierani 11' (pen.)

Estadio San Carlos de Apoquindo, Las Condes, Santiago
Attendance: 5,463
Referee: Jorge Osorio

Universidad Católica won 11–3 on aggregate.

22 January 2013
20:00
1st Leg

Unión Temuco	0–3	Universidad de Chile
	Report	Magalhães 36'; Cortés 67'; Rodríguez 71'

Estadio Germán Becker, Temuco
Attendance: 15,000
Referee: Cristián Andaur
29 January 2013
20:00
2nd Leg

Universidad de Chile	2–0	Unión Temuco
Lorenzetti 22'; Cortés 39'	Report

Estadio Santa Laura, Independencia, Santiago
Attendance: 7,241
Referee: Julio Bascuñán

Universidad de Chile won 5–0 on aggregate.

20 January 2013
16:00
1st Leg

Cobreloa	2–1	O'Higgins
Vidal 4' (o.g.); Cuéllar 25'	Report	Calandria 58'

Estadio Municipal, Calama
Attendance: 2,051
Referee: Manuel Acosta
24 January 2013
19:30
2nd Leg

O'Higgins	2–2	Cobreloa
Calandria 74', 90+4'	Report	Pol 20'; Pizarro 71'

Estadio El Teniente, Rancagua
Attendance: 3,680
Referee: Cristián Andaur

Cobreloa won 4–3 on aggregate.

19 January 2013
18:00
1st Leg

Unión Española	3–0	Rangers
Garrido 38' (o.g.); Gattas 49', 73'	Report

Estadio Santa Laura, Independencia, Santiago
Attendance: 2,458
Referee: Rafael Troncoso
22 January 2013
22:15
2nd Leg

Rangers	2–2	Unión Española
Varas 15'; Silva 60'	Report	Hernández 32'; Scotti 71'

Estadio Fiscal, Talca
Attendance: 2,175
Referee: Christian Rojas

Unión Española won 5–2 on aggregate.

== Semifinals ==
March 27, 2013

Unión Española	0 – 0	Universidad de Chile

Estadio Santa Laura, Santiago
Attendance: 3,707
Referee: J. Osorio

March 27, 2013

Cobreloa	3 – 3	Universidad Católica
Pol 36', 50'; Gracián 53'		10' Meneses; 60' Mirosević; 74' Álvarez

Estadio Tierra de Campeones, Iquique
Attendance: 1,060
Referee: E. Gamboa

April 10, 2013

Universidad Católica	3 – 1	Cobreloa
Castillo 32'; Villanueva 80'; Sosa 90+3'		45' (pen.) Pol

Estadio San Carlos de Apoquindo, Santiago
Attendance: 4,305
Referee: M. Acosta

April 17, 2013

Universidad de Chile	0 – 0	Unión Española
Penalties
Aránguiz (penalty scored); Fernández (penalty scored); Díaz (penalty scored); González (penalty scored); Herrera (penalty scored)	5 – 4	(penalty scored) Scotti; (penalty scored) Cueva; (penalty scored) Castro; (penalty missed) Ampuero; (penalty scored) Rubio

Estadio Nacional, Santiago
Attendance: 17,845
Referee: C. Puga

== Final ==
8 May 2013
20:00

Universidad Católica	1–2	Universidad de Chile
Sosa 12'	Report	Díaz 3'; Duma 90+1'

Estadio Germán Becker, Temuco
Attendance: 15,650
Referee: Eduardo Gamboa

Copa Chile
2012–13 champion

4th title

== Top goalscorers ==
Pos	Player	Club	Goals
1	(Chile) Matías Donoso	U. Temuco	8
1	(Chile) Diego de Gregorio	Barnechea	8
3	(Argentina) Sebastián Pol	Cobreloa	7
3	(Argentina) Mario Pierani	Coquimbo U.	7
