= 2013 Supercopa de Chile =

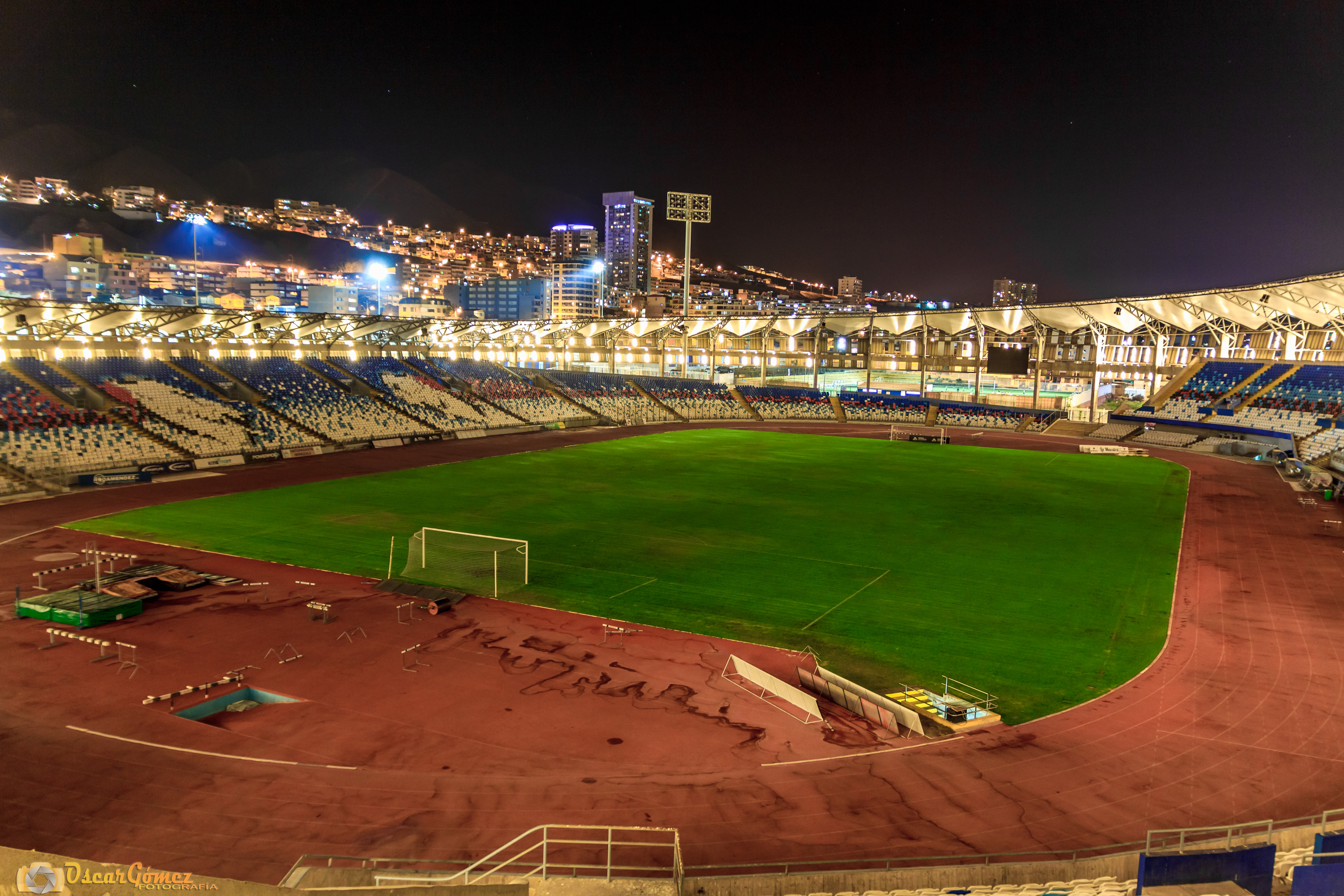
- Event: Supercopa de Chile 2013
Unión Española	Universidad de Chile
2	0
- Date: 10 July 2013
- Venue: Estadio Regional Calvo y Bascuñán, Antofagasta
- Referee: Enrique Osses
- Attendance: 5,523
- Weather: Clear; 12 °C (54 °F)

The 2013 Supercopa de Chile was the first edition of this championship organised by the ANFP.

The match was played between the 2013 Torneo de Transición Champion Unión Española, and the 2012–13 Copa Chile Winner Universidad de Chile

== Road to the final ==
The two teams that contested the Supercopa were Unión Española, that qualified as 2013 Torneo de Transición Champion, and Universidad de Chile, that qualified for the match as the winner of the 2012–13 Copa Chile, defeating Universidad Católica 2:1 at the Estadio Germán Becker.

Unión Española	Universidad de Chile
2013 Torneo de Transición Champion	Winner of the 2012–13 Copa Chile

== Details ==
10 July 2013
20:00

Unión Española	2–0	Universidad de Chile
Canales 35'; Hernández 90'

Estadio Regional Calvo y Bascuñán, Antofagasta
Attendance: 5,523
Referee: Enrique Osses

== Champion ==
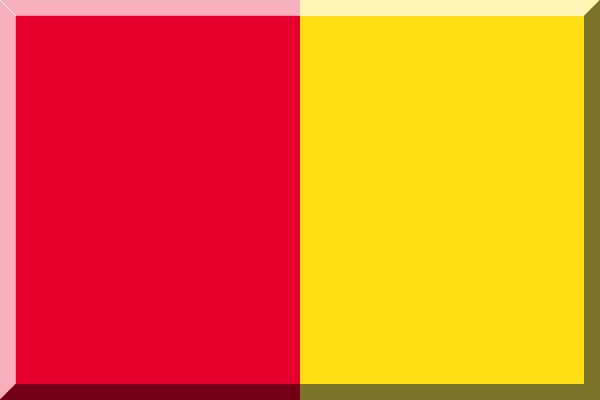
Champion
Union Española
1st title
