= Plet =

Plet is a surname. Notable people with the surname include:

- Desmond Plet (born 1981), Surinamese politician
- Ernest Plet (1864–1929), French politician
- Eugène Plet (born 1952), French racing cyclist
- Gilbrano Plet (born 1993), Dutch footballer
- Glynor Plet (born 1987), Dutch footballer
- Melvin Plet (born 1974), Dutch footballer

== See also ==
- Plett
