= Ibou =

Ibou is a given name. Notable people with the name include:

- Ibrahim "Ibou" Ba (born 1973), French footballer
- Ibou Badji (born 2002), Senegalese basketball player
- Ibou Cissé (born 1996), French footballer
- Ibou Faye (1969–2025), Senegalese athlete
- Papa Ibou Kébé (born 1989), French footballer
- Ebrahima "Ibou" Sawaneh (born 1986), Gambian footballer
- Ibou Touray (born 1994), Gambian footballer
