= Maretić =

Maretić is a Croatian surname. Notable people with the name include:

- Damir Maretić (born 1969), Croatian football player
- Juraj Maretić (born 1993), Croatian football player
- Tomislav Maretić (1854–1938), Croatian linguist and lexicographer

== See also ==
- Martić
