= Marčić =

Marčić (Serbian: Марчић) is a surname. Notable people with the surname include:

- Filip Marčić (born 1985), Croatian footballer
- Milan Marčić (born 1996), Serbian footballer

== See also ==
- Martić
