= Martic =

Martic can refer to:

- Martic Township, Pennsylvania
- Martić, Serbo-Croatian surname
- Martič, Slovene surname
