= Matthew Rowell =

Matthew Rowell may refer to:

- Matthew Rowell (Australian footballer) (born 2001), Australian rules footballer
- Matthew Rowell (South African footballer) (born 1993), South African footballer (soccer player)
