= Taulant (name) =

- Gender: Male

Origin
- Region of origin: Albania, Kosovo

Taulant is an Albanian masculine given name and may refer to:

- Taulant Balla (born 1977), Albanian politician
- Taulant Çerçizi (born 1981), Albanian footballer
- Taulant Kadrija (born 1993), Slovenian footballer
- Taulant Kuqi (born 1985), Albanian footballer
- Taulant Marku (born 1994), Albanian footballer
- Taulant Seferi (born 1996), Albanian footballer
- Taulant Sefgjinaj (born 1986), Albanian footballer
- Taulant Xhaka (born 1991), Albanian footballer
