= Martič =

Martič is a Slovenian surname. Notable people with the surname include:

- Zoran Martič (born 1965), Slovenian basketball coach
- Zvezdan Martič (born 1963), Slovenian journalist and engineer

== See also ==
- Martić
