= Estadio Regional de Antofagasta =

Sports stadium in Chile

- El "Coloso" de Angamos (The Colossus of Angamos)
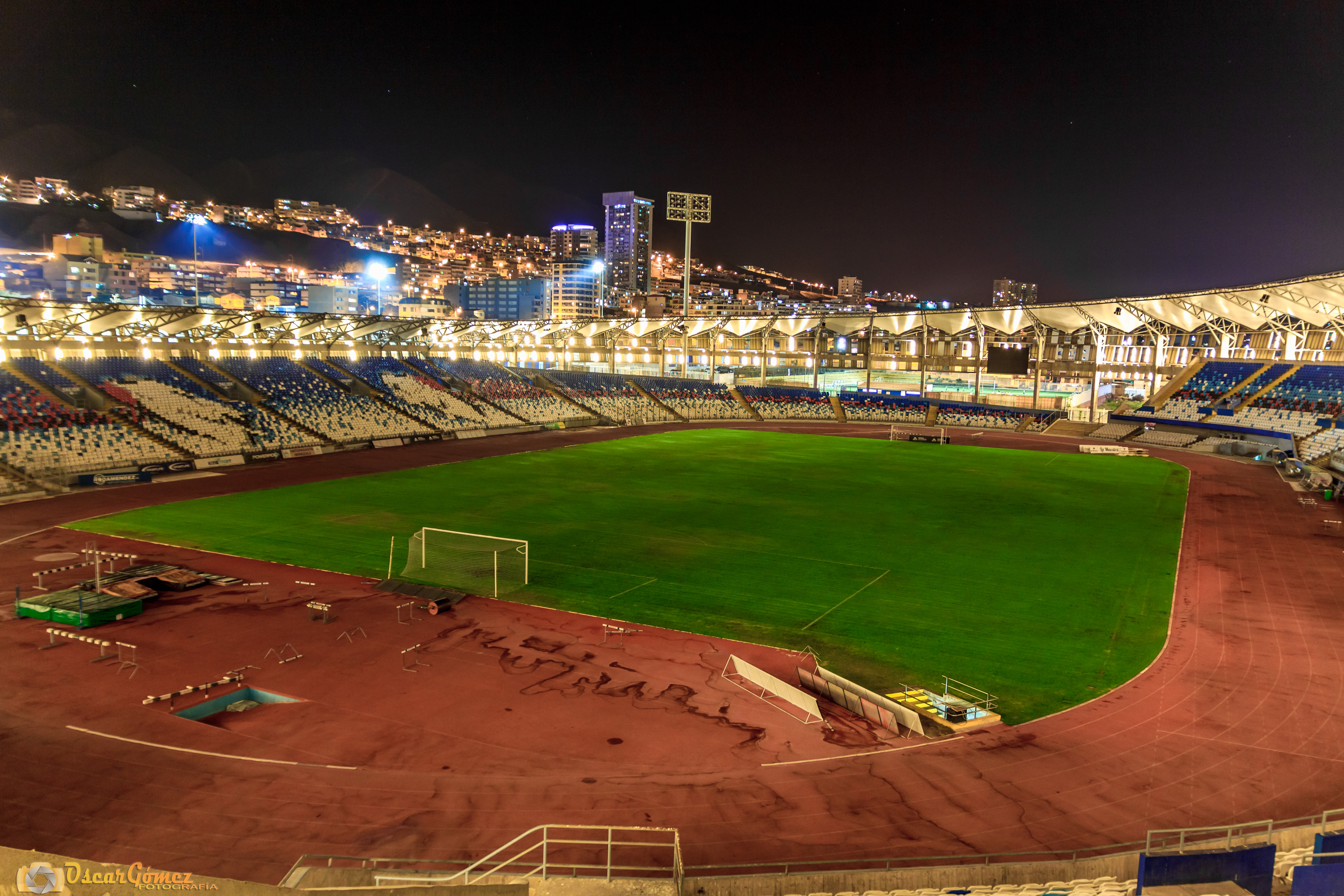
- Fulfillment on FIFA football stadiums technical recommendations and requirements

- Antofagasta, Chile
- Full name: Estadio Regional Bicentenario Calvo y Bascuñán de Antofagasta
- Former names: Estadio Regional de Antofagasta(1964–2010)
- Location: Angamos Avenue; Antofagasta, Chile
- Coordinates: 23°40′12″S 70°24′18″W
- Owner: Municipality of Antofagasta
- Capacity: 35,000 spectators (initial construction); 21,178 seatings (after renovation); 20,690 (international)
- Executive suites: 36
- Type: Sports complex
- Surface: Field: grass (ryegrass and Bermuda on field No. 1); Athletic track: Regupol AG
- Scoreboard: 48 m^{2} LED Screens
- Record attendance: 32,663 (Antofagasta Portuario – Colo Colo, July 22, 1973)
- Field size: 106 m × 68 m (348 ft × 223 ft)
- Field shape: Rectangular
- Acreage: 7,280 m^{2} (78,400 sq ft) (building); 30,000 m^{2} (320,000 sq ft) (total property)
- Public transit: TransAntofagasta

Construction
- Groundbreaking: July 3, 1961
- Built: July 3, 1961 – October 3, 1964
- Opened: October 8, 1964
- Renovated: July 26, 2011 – March 20, 2013
- Cost: US$ 13,062,290; CLP 8,800,000,000; EU€ 12,498,000.
- Architects: Original: Mario Recordón; Remodelation: Valle & Cornejo Arquitectos; Nicolás Lipthay (Collaboration Associated)
- Project managers: Original: Municipality of Antofagasta; Remodelation: Instituto Nacional del Deporte; Minera Escondida; Municipality of antofagasta
- Structural engineer: Santolaya Ingenieros Consultores S.A. (Remodeling)
- General contractors: Construction: Constructora Wadeless Balmaceda Mathiew y Cia. (1961 Construction); Empresa Constructora e Industrial Jorge Razmilic y Cia. (1962 Continued Construction); Remodelation: Navarrete y Díaz Cumsille Ingenieros Civiles S.A. (Remodeling)
- Main contractors: Sociedad Comercial Wu y Pazzanese Limitada (LED Screens Installation); Led Neón Chile Vía Pública Ltda.(acquisition and Installation of seatings); Philips Chile (Lighting fixtures); Parques Johnson Construcciones deportivas y Áreas Verdes (Delivery Seed of Ryegrass and Bermuda to No. 1 Field); Milton Astudillo Capetillo (Delivery Seed of to 2, 3 and 4 Fields)

Tenants
- Football: Club de Deportes Antofagasta (CDA) (1966–present); Club deportivo Ormazabal (2006–present); Club Deportivo Unión Bellavista (1964–1966, 2008–present) Baseball: Asociación de Béisbol de Antofagasta (1966–present)

Website
- Municipality of Antofagasta website
- Major sporting events hosted; 1987 FIFA World Youth Championship; Supercopa de Chile 2013; Copa Sudamericana 2013; Copa América 2015

Estadio Regional de Antofagasta, officially Estadio Regional Bicentenario Calvo y Bascuñan de Antofagasta, (Spanish: [esˈtaðjo βiθenteˈnaɾjo ˈkalβoj βasˈkuɲan]) is a sport facilities complex located in Antofagasta, Chile. The municipality of Antofagasta is the owner of the building and it used to host sports events such as cultural events and entertainment events. The complex is composed of the Main Stadium who is use made for most important events. The secondary fields, 1, 2, 3 and 4, are used for training sessions. The Field 5 is used to secondary events, with football pitch dimensions and counts with a Baseball field where are made the regional tournaments of this sport.

It is currently the home stadium of the Football Team of the city, Club de Deportes Antofagasta, of Chilean Primera División. The Chile national football team plays for the first time in this stadium on April 28, 2004, in a friendly match with the Perú. With an attendance of 32,000 spectators.

The Complex was built in 1964 by the Municipality of Antofagasta and supported by the Regional Stadium Construction Committee (Comité Pro Construcción Estadio Regional) the main stadium of this complex had an initial capacity of 35.000 spectators, after de renovation, In 2011 started the renovation of the stadium changed the maximum of capacity to 21,178 spectators since in 2013.

In February 2010, by requests from the community of Antofagasta that began in 2003, the mayor of the city called to the community to send names to name the stadium through popular votation to elect this. The winning the name was "Estadio Calvo y Bascuñan".

The stadium has been a venue for the 1987 FIFA World Youth Championship, 2013 Supercopa de Chile, Copa Sudamericana 2013 and Copa América 2015.

== History ==
=== Development and construction ===
A city stadium was considered in 1955, with the intention that it could function as host for the 1962 FIFA World Cup in Chile. The initiative was led by two professionals from Antofagasta, Miguel Bascuñán Pavez and Alberto Calvo Nieto, who formed the "Pro-Construction Committee" in 1958 with the aim of solidifying the project. It was decreed by law (13,080 from the Ministry of the Interior of Chile) that the lands then-occupied by the Club Hípico de Antofagasta (Riding Club of Antofagasta) be expropriated to the municipality for the construction of the stadium, stipulating the amount to be paid, the agreement being effective on January 31, 1959. The amount decreed was 300 million CLP.

The 1960 Valdivia earthquake caused severe damage to several stadiums in Chile, upsetting the calendar for the World Cup. On September 30, 1960, the Corporation of Development of Chile (Corfo) provided economic contributions toward the construction of the Antofagasta stadium, under the condition that work began before March 1, 1961. Mayor Santiago Gajardo handed over the land to the Santiago-based Wedeles, Balmaceda, Mathieu and Company, Ltd. on January 5, 1961. The work officially began on January 18. However, due to financial problems, construction was postponed and the committee responsible was dissolved. Work resumed on July 3, 1961, with the demolition of the riding club's facilities. Calvo and Bascuñan reformed the construction committee and secured government and private funding, though they'd lost the opportunity to host the 1962 World Cup. On July 9, 1962, Razmilic and Co. restarted the unfinished work.

=== Inauguration ===
On October 8, 1964, the stadium was inaugurated before President Jorge Alessandri, Mayor Juan Floreal Recabarren and his predecessor Santiago Gajardo. Trading markets in the city closed that day at noon, with a request that private companies enable their workers to attend the event. Approximately 32,000 people came. The stadium was then the second largest in the country. The match of the event was between Unión Bellavista (local team) and Club Deportivo Universidad Católica. On October 12, a game was played between the teams of the city of Asociación de Fútbol de Antofagasta and Chuquicamata, which was attended by approximately 16,000 spectators. The result of the match was 4–2 for Antofagasta, the coach of the team of Antofagasta was Luis Santibañez Diaz.

The stadiums are schools,

Because there the youth is educated in the physical, muscular and this, once achieved, reports immense benefits for the family and community:

To make stadiums is to make homeland.

— Mario Recordón, 100 Obras, 200 Años; Legado Bicentenario cited from stadium inauguration in 1964

On July 7, 1965, the construction committee was dissolved and another association formed to complete the lighting of the stadium. Chile Exploration Company donated US$100,000 to finance this project.

=== Notable events, 1967–2008 ===
In February 1967, a youth football championship was held, in which one of the finalists was the Iquique team.

On July 22, 1973, the highest ever attendance was recorded, when 32,663 people watched the Primera Division match between Antofagasta and Colo-Colo.

In October 1987, the stadium was a host for the 1987 FIFA World Youth Championship, where the national teams of West Germany, Bulgaria, United States and Saudi Arabia, all of Group D, played 6 games. The stadium also hosted the quarter-final match between West Germany and Scotland. The average audience attendance was 8,417. A large investment had to be made for the stadium to host the event, with improvements to field number 5, the stands and scoreboard.

In 1996, the six-lane athletic track was installed. On the same year. The first game registered by Club de Deportes Antofagasta Portuario, valid for national tournaments, exercising of local, was in the encounter between Club Lister Rossel de Linares and Portuario, beating to this first one by 2–1.

In 2001, an audit was carried out which established the embezzlement of funds and corruption of a public instrument by a municipal official. It was reported that Mayor Pedro Araya filed a federal court complaint regarding this event.

On September 20, 2013, the final of the National Children's Baseball tournament was played at the stadium's baseball field, in which Antofagasta and Iquique met.

In April 2014, a friendly match was proposed between the national teams of Chile and Peru, for which the mayor of Antofagasta promised to improve the state of the field. The manager of Peru's team decided not to train in the stadium, alluding to security problems and a need to practice without spectators. The match was held on April 28, resulting in a tie, with an attendance of 32,000.

In 2005, a friendly match was held between the teams of River Plate U-23 and the Chilean U-20 team, with the aim of preparing the national team for the World Cup in Holland.

In 2006, Club de Deportes Antofagasta (CDA) acquired 650 seats from Brazil, with an investment of 8,000,000 CLP, installed in the stadium's preferred sector, for the anniversary of the city and the return to Premiere A series football. In addition to these improvements, the Regional Intendant asked that the stadium be provided with a synthetic track, in order to improve athletic practices.

The remodeling of the athletic track increased the number of lanes from 6 to 8, using the synthetic material Repugol AF. It cost 816.212.000 CLP, financed by the Municipality of Antofagasta, the regional council and Chiledeportes (a national program to promote sport activities). The CDA team had to move to other venues during the construction.

Chiledeportes promised a US$3 million investment to five Chilean stadiums, including that of Antofagasta, for the 2008 FIFA U-20 Women's World Cup. Former Secretary General of CONCACAF (Confederation of North, Central American and Caribbean Association Football), Chuck Blazer, inspected the stadium and found that it was not fit to host matches of the competition. He recommended improvements to be made within 60 days to meet FIFA requirements. The bathrooms were closed by the Ministry of Health of Antofagasta due to the low quality of hygiene.

=== Remodeling and renaming ===
On January 22, 2009, the stadium was among 15 venues chosen for a remodeling in the second phase of the national program Red de Estadios Bicentenario (Bicentennial Stadium Network) and was installed the synthetic grass on the field 5. The opening match for this setting was between Club de Deportes Antofagasta and Municipal Mejillones on U-15 category, the result of the match was 1-0, won Antofagasta. Minera Escondida, the first private company to invest in the program, committed US$8.8 million for the remodeling of the stadium. This was added to contributions of the regional government, Chiledeportes and Ministry of Public Works. The remodel would include a modern electronic scoreboard, perimeter lighting, dressing rooms, massage rooms, a preparatory area for referees, and parking and recreation areas. An agreement between Minera Escondida and the respective public organizations was to open bidding in August, with works to begin in November 2010.

Former mayor Pedro Araya and a group from the sports community sought to rename the stadium "Calvo Bascuñan", in tribute to the promoters of its original construction. The municipality opened a process to consider this and other suggestions from the citizens. On February 13, 2010, the evaluation committee reported that the stadium would be renamed Calvo y Bascuñan (Calvo and Bascuñan).

The Municipal Council processed the remodeling of the stadium in May 2010, by means of an extraordinary section needed to regularize the agreement – as Minera Escondida was a private entity and the project was a public work. It was assigned to the municipality through the Corporación Municipal de Deportes.

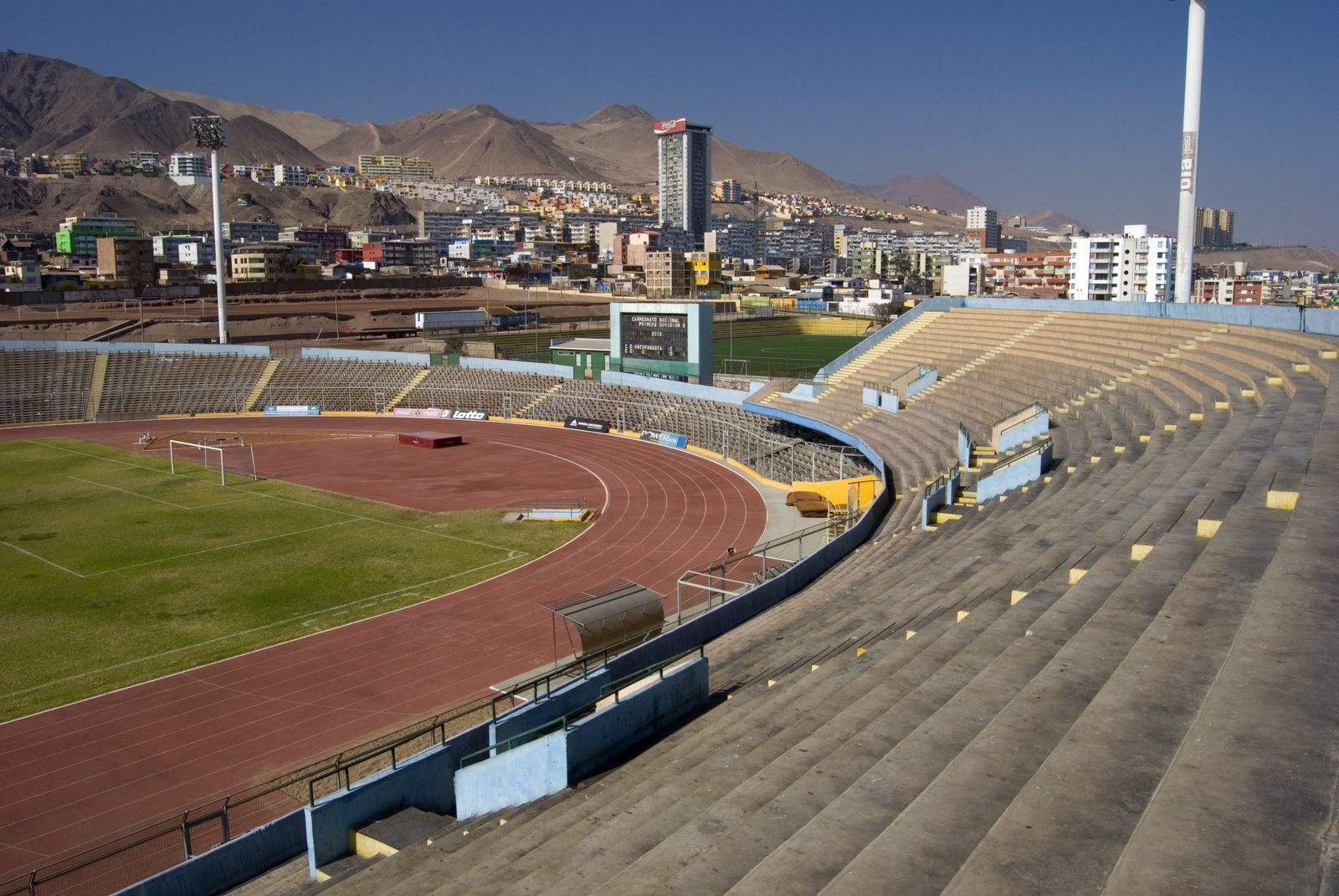
Photography of the stadium in 2010, before the remodel.

Due to the 2010 Chile earthquake which occurred on February 27, the government reallocated the committed money for the stadium to the disaster area, to the annoyance of former-mayor Marcela Hernando. On June 2, the former mayor received a commitment from the National Sports Institute, which would deliver 62.5% of their promised funding in 2011 and 32.5% in 2012. The former Secretary of Sports, Gabriel Ruiz-table, visited the stadium with the mayor, assuring that there would be resources for the remodeling so that the venue could be used for other events in addition to football matches.

Bidding proposals were opened on June 7, 2010. The only presentation was from the company Salfa SA, which proposed either following the established model or its own draft, either of which exceeded the established budget for the project. On June 21, the economic proposal was opened, and a second call for tenders was made on November 20. In October the Municipality of Antofagasta asked for support from the Chilean National Football Association (ANFP) with the purpose of getting more financial resources to make the remodelation. This action results in an agreement between the association and the municipality. Interest was expressed by 21 companies, and at that time it was expected that work could begin in May 2012.

In 2011, the opening for technical proposals was presented. It was stipulated that the opening period would be in July. The winning proposal was from Valle & Cornejo Arquitectos, with contributions of L2C and architect Nicolás Lipthay. On July 28, the works were contracted to the construction company Navarrate Díaz Cumsille and Ingeniería y Construcciones Serinco Ltd., and the main coliseum was closed for a projected term of 360 days.

In February 2011, the first Chile national American football team play an exhibition match against a local team called Gladiadores del Desierto, this match was on the 5° Field of the stadium, the result was 26-18, the winner was the Chile national team.

In July 2011, was begun makes the removal of tons of debris to begin the realization of the major works to renovate the stadium.

In December 2011, the construction suffered a delay of two months due to problems with the foundations of roof supports. There were additional delays in October 2012 regarding the seating.

In December 2012, Antofagasta was officially declared as one of the cities to host the 2015 Copa América.

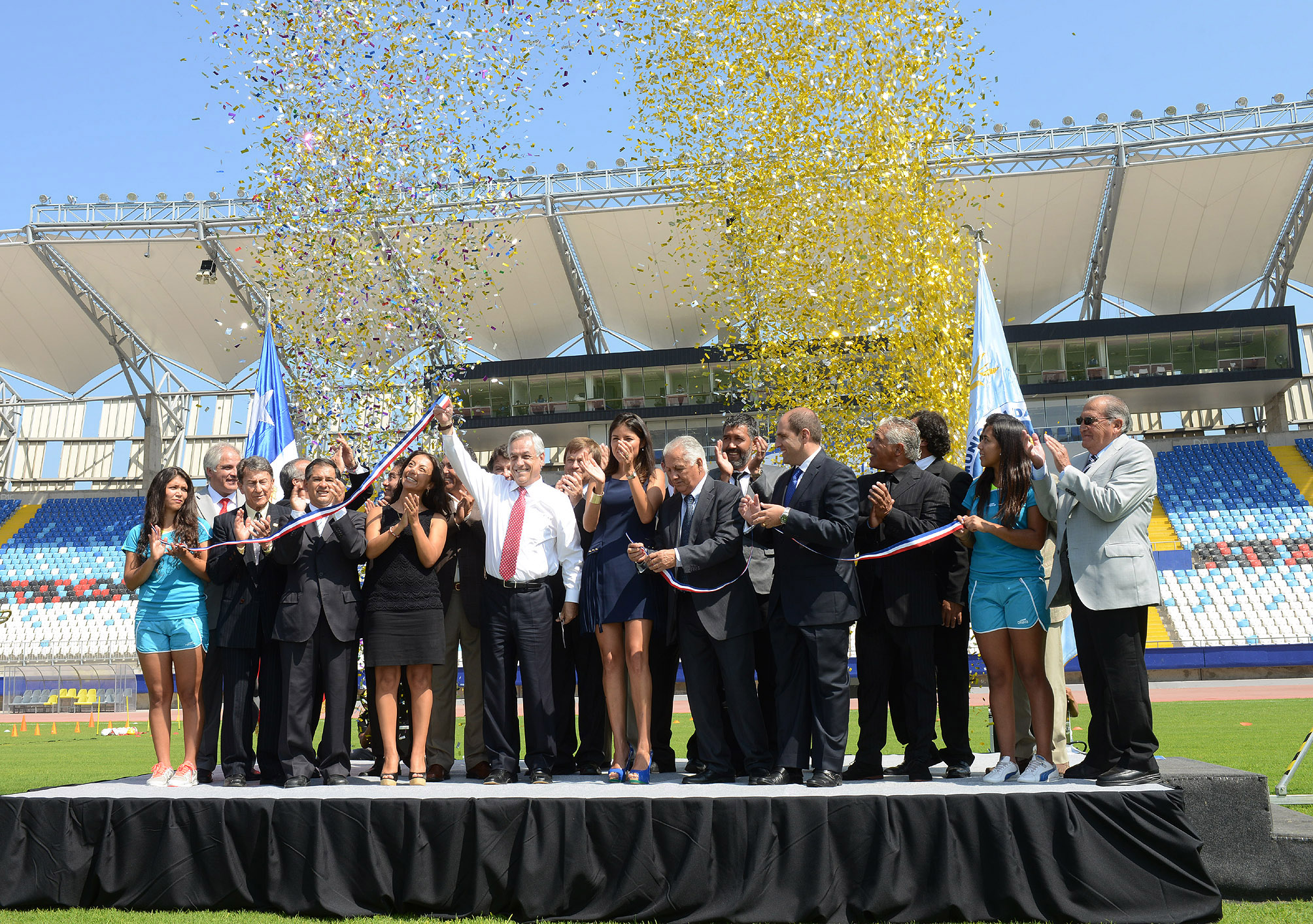
Former president Sebastián Piñera Echenique, cutting the tape to inaugurate the remodeling of the stadium, March 20, 2016.

On March 20, 2013, a private inauguration ceremony was held. Former-president Sebastián Piñera cut the tape as part of the protocol. The public ceremony began with a performance of the city's philharmonic orchestra, followed by a match between CDA and América de Cali. The musical group Garras de Amor performed prior to the party of Colo-Colo and Universidad Católica. There was public criticism for the high price of the tickets to the opening party, and a group of councilors argued that the inaugurations of public places should be free as special moments for the city. The inauguration was concluded by the percussion of the team of América de Cali, which was delayed in arriving to the city.

=== 2013–present ===
In November 2014, the stadium was officially declared a host for the Copa America 2015 tournament. Through a draw, Jamaica, Paraguay and Uruguay would compete in the stadium. In December the director of the event confirmed to Antofagasta that its stadium was well-liked by the Jamaica National Team, which was competing in the Copa America for the first time.

On August 7, 2014, work began to meet the Confederación Sudamericana de Fútbol's (CONMEBOL) requirements for the Copa America 2015. The company MAC won the bidding for $4,997,657,850 CLP, delivered by the Fondo Nacional de Desarrollo Regional (Financial instrument) to the municipality, with a term of 5 months. On January 27, eight lighting towers and generators were installed for night events on additional courts.

== International events ==
=== Football ===
==== 1987 FIFA World Youth Championship ====
On May 29, 1987, was the draw of the 1987 FIFA World Youth Championship, In live broadcast from the Hotel Sheraton on Santiago de Chile, in this draw was assigned the teams to the groups, Antofagasta was host of the Group D, conformed with the followings teams: Bulgaria, Saudi Arabia, United States and West Germany.

The first match of the Group was United States against Bulgaria on October 11, both teams used the 4-4-2 system, the result of the match was 0-1 in favor of Bulgaria team, scored by Dimitar Trendafilov on 26 min of the match. The referee was Jean-Fidele Diramba.

In the Groups phase of the tournament, the stadium hosted a total of 50.500 spectators, with an average of 8.400. The first day was hosted of 26.000 spectators (matches 4 and 8). The second day hosted 13.000 spectators (Matches 12 and 16). The third day the number of spectators on the matches 20 and 24 was of 11.500 spectators. On Quarter final the stadium was hosted by 4.000 spectators been the last of the 4 venues in this phase.

Date	Time (UTC−3)	Team No. 1	Res.	Team No. 2	Round	Attendance
October 11, 1987	17:00	United States	0-1	Bulgaria	Group D	18.000
October 12, 1987	17:00	Saudi Arabia	0-3	West Germany	Group D	8.000
October 14, 1987	17:00	United States	1-0	Saudi Arabia	Group D	5.000
October 15, 1987	17:00	Bulgaria	0-3	West Germany	Group D	8.000
October 17, 1987	17:00	United States	1-2	West Germany	Group D	3.500
October 18, 1987	17:00	Bulgaria	2-0	Saudi Arabia	Group D	8.000
October 21, 1987	16:45	West Germany	1-1 (4-3)	Scotland	Quarter Final	4.000

==== 2015 Copa América ====
In 2012, the Municipality of Antofagasta and various institutions announced the nomination of the stadium to be a venue of the events Copa América and Football Youth World Cup in 2015. To meet the required standards, the secondary fields were renovated and seeded with natural grass. Proximity of the airport and medical services were also considered in its selection.

In 2014, CONMEBOL officially chose Antofagasta as one of the eight venues to host the Copa America 2015. Mayor Karen Rojo was charged with improving facilities by the end of the year.

The event schedule was confirmed in 2014. Chosen by draw, the stadium hosted Jamaica vs. Uruguay on June 13 and Jamaica vs. Paraguay on June 16. These were Jamaica's first appearances in the Copa América.

Despite being the third-largest of the eight venues the stadium received the lowest attendances of the competition, with 8,653 and 6,009 spectators. Some locals said that the matches which were hosted in Antofagasta were the least attractive of the tournament.

Date	Time (UTC−3)	Team No. 1	Res.	Team No. 2	Round	Attendance
June 13, 2015	18:30	Uruguay	1–0	Jamaica	Group B	8,653
June 16, 2015	20:30	Paraguay	1–0	Jamaica	Group B	6,099

=== Athletics ===
==== Ninth handicapped and blind sportsmans International Tournament ====
In July 2005, the Ninth handicapped and blind sportsmen's International Tournament was organized by the Crippled Club of Antofagasta, Nueva Esperanza, the main competitions was made on track field and the grass of the main field. Perú, Bolivia and Chile was the countries who participated in the tournament. With the support of the national army and the municipality of the city. The first places of the tournament in each categories was the following:

Men

Shot Put
Winner	Country
Luis Román	Bolivia
Ricardo González	Chile
Prosperino Zanzana	Chile
Jorge Carrasco	Chile
Sergio Fuentes	Chile
500 Meters
Carlos Pastén	Chile
Carlos Gallardo	Chile
Dila Martínez	Bolivia
Blinds 100 Meters
Max Cordero	Peru
Miguel Gómez	Peru

Women

Shot Put
Winner	Country
Hermina Olave	Chile
Tabita Parra	Chile
Nayadeth Palma	Chile

== Name ==
In 2003, the president of the Ciclism association of Antofagasta, René Araya, tried to approach to the Municipality of the city to give a name to the stadium.

In July 2006, the former regional delegate of Antofagasta, Manuel Rojas, presented a document to the Municality of Antofagasta, with a proposal to name the stadium "Calvo y Bascuñan", in honor to the main leaders of Comité Pro Construcción Estadio, whom this initiative was possible to build this in 1964.

The former mayor of the city, Daniel Adario, suggested to give a name to the stadium by suffrage. The former President of football association of Chile (ANFP), Harold Mayne-Nicholls, supported the proposal to name the stadium Calvo y Bascuñan.

In October 2007, the councilmen of the municipality on a unanimous decision, approved the project to give to the stadium a name.

In 2009, the community of Antofagasta submitted the names to give a name to the stadium through a contest made by the Municipality of the city through a form on web site of this until November 9 of the same year. The names were the following; “Pedro Reyes”, “Guillermo Martin”, “Luis Santibañez”, "Francisco 'Chamaco' Valdés", “Calvo-Bascuñán”, “Sol del Norte”, “Héroes del Pacífico”, “Coloso”, “Riqueza del Desierto”, “Coliseo 14 de Febrero” y “La Portada”.

On February 13, 2010, the contest to give a name to the stadium finished and the winner proposed name was Calvo y Bascuñan.

== Design ==
=== Architecture and Infrastructure ===
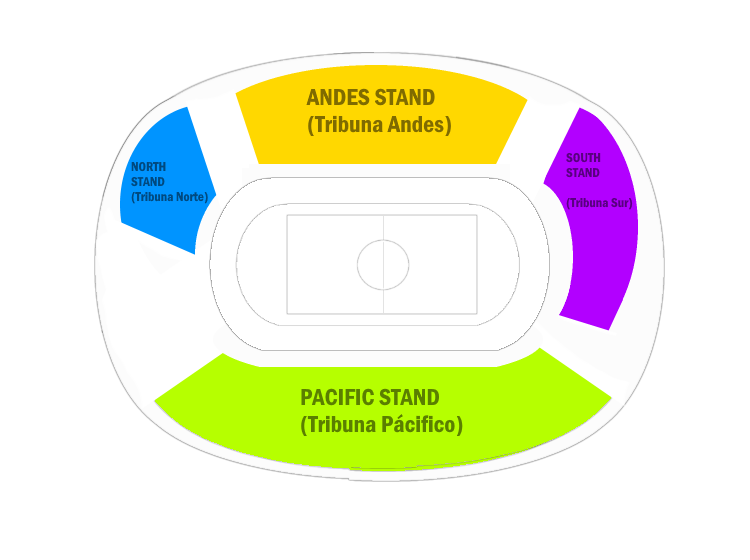
Diagram of the Stadium and his seatings

The stadium's remodel was by architectural company Valle & Cornejo with the collaboration of the architects Nicolás Lipthay, Juan Pablo Duarte, Catalina Donzé, Oscar Conteras and María José Yurisic. The complete area is 30,000 m^{2} (320,000 sq ft). The provider was Serge Ferrari. Landscape architecture was by the company Rencoret & Rüttimann Arquitectura del paisaje (Cecilia Rencoret, Carla Rütimann).

The architects of the remodel describe their work as a search for respect for the urban landmark while seeking a way to unify a design completed by different construction companies. Access to the stadium is organized from the two squares, organizing circulation through a footbridge.

The architectural operation was generated from the desire to make a building with a unique style, through a simple, clean and fancy gesture across the stadium, adding color to the urban environment. The public areas of the enclosure allowed for improved circulation of people.

In 2012, two high-definition LED screens were installed, costing 186,830 million CLP. Set in the south and north area of the stadium, the screens measure 8 by 6 metres (26 ft × 20 ft).

Between 2014 and 2015, 30 Neighbors of Antofagasta participated in a project to create a mosaic made with rocks, ceramics and seashells in the ends of the stadium walls, for the Copa América 2015.

In 2015, lighting was installed on the roof of Tribuna Pacífico, certified by Philips staff of Chile. The project aimed to achieve a lighting quality of 1200 lux.

In the same year, grass was planted in the main field of the stadium. Parques Johnson was the company which completed the work, choosing a mixture of Ryegrass and Bermuda for traction and softness. The second field was finished in June 2015, made of a natural grass, measuring to FIFA standards of 105 by 68 metres (344 ft × 223 ft), with a 24-person dressing room, sanitary facilities, nursing room, eight lighting towers, a 40-person stand and parking facilities.

In June 2015, 270 desks for the press were installed in the stadium, with Wi-fi and LAN access. They were installed on Tribuna Pacifico, in time for Copa America 2015. The monetary investment was 492 million CLP. Also included were six additional press stands.

=== Materials ===
The front of the stadium was designed to endure the climate and urban environment. The materials were chosen to allow easy maintenance. The building has reinforced concrete supports; the concrete terminations have a flat style, and the front slab made with phenolic resin. There is an illumination system in the Area Pacifico.

The seats of the stadium are solid, ergonomic and retractable, with colors allusive to the CDA theme. The seats are folding with armrests and cup holders, fulfilling FIFA standards. The distribution of the seats is to the VIP and very VIP area (36), Tribuna Pacifico (9,437), Tribuna Andes (5,859), north gallery (2,565) and south gallery (3,281).

== Transport and access ==
A map of the Stadium and surrounding connections

TransAntofagasta is the main public transport service to reach the stadium this by public bus service, the following lines of this public transport arrives to the stadium:

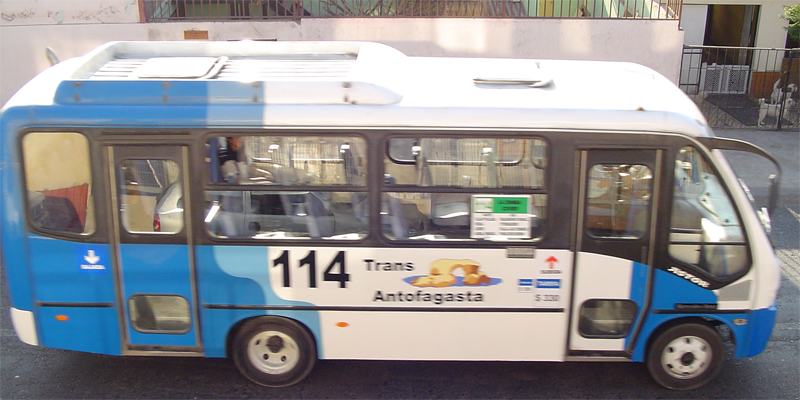
A TransAntofagasta Bus, Line 114, who arrived to Angamos Ave.

North to South:

- Linea 102: Normal Travel (Playa Blanca – Galleguillos Lorca street – Homero Ávila street)
- Linea 104: Normal Travel ( Ave. Argentina – Nicanor Plaza Street)
- Lines 103-107-114- 121: Modificated Travel (Ave. Angamos – Díaz Gana – Galleguillos Lorca – Homero Ávila – Ave. Angamos)
- Linea 109: Normal Travel (Ave. Argentina direct to Coviefi street)
- Lines 110, 111 y 112: Normal Travel Ave. Argentina direct to Coviefi street
- Linea 129: Antonio Poupin – Galleguillos Lorca – Homero Ávila- Ave. Angamos

South to North

- Lines 104-129: Normal Travel; Av. Angamos – Homero Ávila – Eduardo Orchard
- Lines 102-107: Modificated Travel; Av. Angamos – Homero Ávila – Eduardo Orchard
- Lines 103-114- 121: Modificated Travel; (Ave. Angamos – Homero Ávila – Eduardo Orchard – Salvador Reyes – Ave. O’Higgins)
- Línea 109, 111 y 112: Normal Travel (Coviefi direct to Ave. Argentina)
- Línea 110 : Modificated travel (Coviefi directo a Av. Argentina)

== See also ==
- List of football stadiums in Chile

Preceded by None	Supercopa de Chile; Final Venue; 2013	Succeeded by Estadio San Carlos de Apoquindo; Santiago de Chile
