= Lina Lundqvist =

Swedish footballer

Personal information
- Full name: Lina Lundqvist
- Date of birth: 8 January 1993 (age 33)
- Place of birth: Tärnsjö, Sweden
- Height: 1.83 m (6 ft 0 in)
- Position: Goalkeeper

Team information
- Current team: Gamla Upsala

Youth career
- Tärnsjö IF

Senior career*
Years	Team	Apps	(Gls)
2009	IK Fyris		
2010–2011	Danmarks IF		
2012–2014	IK Sirius	12	(0)
2015	QBIK	26	(0)
2016–2017	Kvarnsvedens IK	10	(0)
2018	IFK Kalmar	4	(0)
2019–2021	IK Uppsala	38	(0)
2022-	Gamla Upsala	6	(0)
- * Club domestic league appearances and goals

Lina Lundqvist (born 8 January 1993) is a Swedish football goalkeeper who plays for Gamla Upsala. She previously played for Kvarnsvedens IK.
