= Sarah Bergman =

Swedish footballer

Personal information
- Full name: Sarah Bergman
- Date of birth: 12 August 1993 (age 33)
- Place of birth: Sweden
- Position: Defender

Team information
- Current team: Mallbackens IF

Senior career*
Years	Team	Apps	(Gls)
2011–2012	QBIK	40	(0)
2014–2016	Mallbackens IF	90	(1)
2017–2019	Eskilstuna United DFF	2	(0)
2019–	Mallbackens IF	47	(2)

International career^{‡}
2010	Sweden U19	1	(0)
- * Club domestic league appearances and goals as of 7 September 2016 ‡ National team caps and goals as of 22 May 2016

Sarah Bergman (born 12 August 1993) is a Swedish football defender who plays for Mallbackens IF.

== Honours ==
Sweden U19

Winner

- UEFA Women's Under-19 Championship: 2012
