= Pedro Oliveira (footballer, born 1994) =

Portuguese footballer

Pedro Miguel Tavares de Oliveira (born 16 January 1993 in Vale de Cambra) is a Portuguese footballer who plays for U.D. Oliveirense as a forward.

== Career ==
On 15 December 2013, Oliveira made his professional debut with Oliveirense in a 2013–14 Segunda Liga match against Portimonense.
