= Appolinaire Danvidé =

Beninese footballer

Personal information
- Full name: Ogouloye Appolinaire Danvidé
- Date of birth: 15 April 1993 (age 33)
- Place of birth: Soubré, Ivory Coast
- Height: 1.86 m (6 ft 1 in)
- Position: Defender

Team information
- Current team: Heartland

Youth career
- 2009–2011: Soleil FC
- 2011–2013: Cavaliers de Nikki

Senior career*
Years	Team	Apps	(Gls)
2013–2017	AS Douanes (Niamey)	31	(8)
2017–2018	Séwé Sport	10	(0)
2019	AS Otôho		
2019–	Heartland		

International career
2014–	Benin	2	(0)
- * Club domestic league appearances and goals as of 10:09, 27 February 2019 (UTC)

Ogouloye Appolinaire Danvidé (born 15 April 1993) is a Beninese professional footballer who plays as a defender for Heartland.

== Club career ==
Danvidé began his career in 2009 with Soleil FC, before joining Cavaliers de Nikki in 2011.

He earned a move to Nigerien side AS Douanes (Niamey) in 2013 ahead of the 2014–15 season. He left in October 2017.

On 7 October 2017, he joined Ivorian side Séwé Sport on a one-year deal.

He joined Congolese club TP Mazembe on trial in July 2018, but failed to sign a contract due to monetary agreement.

=== AS Otôho ===
It was announced on 24 January 2019 that Danvidé had signed for Congolese club, AS Otôho, on a one-year deal for an undisclosed fee, with a negotiation clause for a further year. He featured in the club second round matches in CAF Confederation Cup.

== International career ==
Danvidé was born to Beninese parents, which grants him the right to play for Benin or the Ivory Coast.

He was called up to the national side for the very first time in 2014. He made the 23-man squad to face Malawi at Stade de l’Amitié on 20 July 2014, ahead of the first leg match of the AFCON 2015 qualifier.
