= Papa Alassane Ndiaye =

Senegalese footballer

Papa Alassane
Personal information
- Full name: Papa Alassane Ndiaye
- Date of birth: 15 March 1993 (age 33)
- Position: Defender

Youth career
- 2009–2010: Estrela da Amadora
- 2011–2012: Sacavenense

Senior career*
Years	Team	Apps	(Gls)
2012–2014	Sacavenense	25	(0)
2014–2017	Trofense		
2017–2018	GS Loures	28	(1)
- * Club domestic league appearances and goals as of 25 January 2015

Papa Alassane Ndiaye (born 15 March 1993) is a Senegalese footballer who plays as a defender.

== Career ==
On 13 August 2014, Ndiaye made his professional debut with Trofense in a 2014–15 Taça da Liga match against Atlético.
