= Valkenedy =

Brazilian footballer

Personal information
- Full name: Valkenedy da Silva Nascimento
- Date of birth: 13 June 1993 (age 33)
- Place of birth: São Paulo, Brazil
- Height: 1.76 m (5 ft 9 in)
- Position: Midfielder

Youth career
- 2012: Internacional
- 2012: Portuguesa

Senior career*
Years	Team	Apps	(Gls)
2014	Santa Rita	0	(0)
2014	→ Paços de Ferreira (loan)	0	(0)
2015	CRB	3	(0)
2015	→ Ituano (loan)	0	(0)
2016	Ituano	1	(0)
2017	Metropolitano	17	(1)
2017–2018	Brusque	15	(0)
2017–2018	→ Nacional (loan)	11	(0)
2018	Venados	6	(0)
2019	Brusque	6	(0)
2019	→ Almirante Barroso (loan)	0	(0)
2019-2020	Caçadorense AC	0	(0)
2020	UR Trabalhadore	9	(0)
2020-2021	Renaux	0	(0)
- * Club domestic league appearances and goals as of 8 February 2026

Valkenedy da Silva Nascimento (born 13 June 1993) is a former Brazilian professional footballer who played as a midfielder.

== Club career ==
He made his professional debut in the Campeonato Brasileiro Série B for CRB on 9 May 2015 in a game against Bragantino.
