= Arkane Mohamed =

Comorian footballer (born 1993)

Personal information
- Date of birth: 11 October 1993 (age 33)
- Place of birth: Marseille, France
- Position: Midfielder

Team information
- Current team: Volcan Club de Moroni

Senior career*
Years	Team	Apps	(Gls)
2010–2011	Sochaux B		
2011–2013	Dijon B		
2013–2014	Tarbes Pyrénées	20	(0)
2014–2015	Belfort	22	(0)
2015–2016	Beauvais Oise	23	(0)
2016–2017	Bergerac Périgord	5	(0)
2017–2018	Olympique Alès	23	(0)
2018–2019	AS Belfort Sud		
2019–2020	FC Develier		
2020	FC Mtsapéré		
2021–	Volcan Club de Moroni		

International career^{‡}
2015–2022	Comoros	11	(0)
- * Club domestic league appearances and goals as of 18:15, 2 November 2015 (UTC) ‡ National team caps and goals as of 6 July 2025

Arkane Mohamed (born 11 October 1993) is a Comorian international footballer who plays for Volcan Club de Moroni, as a midfielder.

== Career ==
Born in Marseille, Mohamed has played for Sochaux B, Dijon B, Tarbes Pyrénées, Belfort and Beauvais Oise.

He made his international debut for Comoros in 2015. He later featured in the 2022 COSAFA Cup.
