= Nuha Barrow =

Gambian footballer

Personal information
- Date of birth: 10 October 1993 (age 33)
- Place of birth: Tujereng, Gambia
- Height: 1.85 m (6 ft 1 in)
- Position: Defender

Team information
- Current team: ASC Linguère

Senior career*
Years	Team	Apps	(Gls)
2014–2016	Gamtel		
2016–	AS Douanes		

International career^{‡}
2015–	Gambia	3	(0)
- * Club domestic league appearances and goals as of 12:23, 2 March 2018 (UTC) ‡ National team caps and goals as of 12:23, 2 March 2018 (UTC)

Nuha Barrow (born 10 October 1993) is a Gambian international footballer who plays for AS Douanes, as a defender.

== Career ==
Born in Tujereng, he has played club football for Gamtel and AS Douanes.

He made his international debut for Gambia in 2015.
