= Albin Nilsson =

Swedish footballer

Personal information
- Date of birth: 11 August 1993 (age 33)
- Place of birth: Sweden
- Height: 1.74 m (5 ft 9 in)
- Positions: Left back; right back

Youth career
- IFK Hässleholm
- Ängelholms FF

Senior career*
Years	Team	Apps	(Gls)
2010–2017	Ängelholms FF	110	(4)
2017–2019	Trelleborgs FF	22	(1)
- * Club domestic league appearances and goals as of 22:05, 9 December 2019 (UTC)

Albin Nilsson (born 11 August 1993) is a Swedish footballer who most recently played for Trelleborgs FF.
