= David Alves =

Brazilian footballer (born 2008)

Personal information
- Full name: David Alves França
- Date of birth: 4 February 2008 (age 18)
- Place of birth: Ferraz de Vasconcelos, Brazil
- Height: 1.76 m (5 ft 9 in)
- Position: Forward

Team information
- Current team: Coritiba
- Number: 33

Youth career
- Palmeiras (futsal)
- 2024–: Coritiba

Senior career*
Years	Team	Apps	(Gls)
2026–	Coritiba	1	(0)
- * Club domestic league appearances and goals as of 22:55, 17 May 2026 (UTC)

David Alves França (born 4 February 2008), known as David Alves or just David, is a Brazilian professional footballer who plays as a forward for Coritiba.

== Career ==
Born in Ferraz de Vasconcelos, São Paulo, David played futsal in the youth sides of Palmeiras before joining Coritiba in 2024. In April 2026, he began training with the first team.

David made his senior – and Série A – debut on 17 May 2026, coming on as a late substitute for Breno Lopes in a 3–0 away win over Santos.

== Career statistics ==
As of 17 May 2026

Appearances and goals by club, season and competition
Club	Season	League			State League		Cup		Continental		Other		Total	
Club	Season	Division	Apps	Goals	Apps	Goals	Apps	Goals	Apps	Goals	Apps	Goals	Apps	Goals
Coritiba	2026	Série A	1	0	0	0	0	0	—		—		1	0
Career total			1	0	0	0	0	0	0	0	0	0	1	0
