= Lampros Tairis =

Greek footballer

Personal information
- Date of birth: 7 May 1993 (age 33)
- Place of birth: Greece
- Position: Midfielder

Team information
- Current team: Veria
- Number: 6

Senior career*
Years	Team	Apps	(Gls)
2013–2015	Doxa Pentalofos	52	(0)
2015–2017	Stratoni	51	(0)
2017–2019	Aris Paleochori	23	(0)
2019–	Veria	15	(1)
- * Club domestic league appearances and goals as of 18 August 2020

Lampros Tairis (Greek: Λάμπρος Ταΐρης; born 7 May 1993) is a Greek professional footballer who plays as a midfielder for Football League club Veria.

== Honours ==
Veria

Gamma Ethniki: 2018–19
