= Anna Hjälmkvist =

Swedish footballer

Personal information
- Full name: Anna Hjälmkvist
- Date of birth: 25 March 1993 (age 33)
- Place of birth: Sweden
- Position: Midfielder

Youth career
- IFK Värnamo

Senior career*
| Years | Team | Apps | (Gls) |
| 2011–2013 | Östers IF | 52 | (15) |
| 2014 | Jitex BK | 21 | (0) |
| 2015–2016 | Vittsjö GIK | 28 | (3) |
| 2017–2019 | Växjö DFF | 29 | (1) |
- * Club domestic league appearances and goals as of 21:31, 8 December 2018 (UTC)

Anna Hjälmkvist (born 25 March 1993) is a Swedish footballer who played for Växjö DFF.
