= Fahardine Hassani =

French footballer (born 1993)

Personal information
- Full name: Fahardine Hassani
- Date of birth: November 7, 1993 (age 33)
- Place of birth: Mana, France
- Position: Goalkeeper

Youth career
- 2003–2013: Olympique de Vaulx

Senior career*
Years	Team	Apps	(Gls)
2013–2016	FBBP	0	(0)
2016–2017	Lyon-Duchère	0	(0)
2017–2021	Bourgoin-Jallieu	64	(0)
2021–2022	Châtellerault	2	(0)

International career^{‡}
2018–	Comoros	2	(0)
- * Club domestic league appearances and goals as of 30 June 2018 ‡ National team caps and goals as of 21:12, 18 December 2022 (UTC)

Fahardine Hassani (born 7 November 1993) is a Comorian professional footballer who plays as a goalkeeper for the Comoros national football team.

Hassani spent his entire youth playing for Olympque de Vaulx, and joined Football Bourg-en-Bresse Péronnas 01 as the reserve goalkeeper. After a successful debut season with CS Bourgoin-Jallieu in 2017, Hassani earned a callup to the Comoros national football team.

== International career ==
Hassani made his debut for the Comoros national football team in a 3-0 loss in the 2018 COSAFA Cup to Mozambique on 29 May 2018.
