= Hugo Aquino =

Paraguayan footballer (born 1993)

Personal information
- Full name: Hugo Aquino
- Date of birth: 4 April 1993 (age 33)
- Place of birth: San Lorenzo, Paraguay
- Height: 1.75 m (5 ft 9 in)
- Position: Left back

Youth career
- 2010–2013: Sportivo San Lorenzo

Senior career*
Years	Team	Apps	(Gls)
2013–2015	Sportivo San Lorenzo	60	(3)
2016–2017	Cerro Porteño	15	(0)
2018	Deportivo Capiatá	34	(1)
2019	Sportivo San Lorenzo	6	(0)
- * Club domestic league appearances and goals as of 22:15, 10 October 2019 (UTC)

Hugo Aquino (born 4 April 1993) is a Paraguayan footballer who plays as a left back.
