= Sara Nordin =

Swedish footballer

Personal information
- Date of birth: 26 March 1993 (age 33)
- Place of birth: Sweden
- Height: 1.63 m (5 ft 4 in)
- Position: Defender

Team information
- Current team: AIK
- Number: 5

Senior career*
Years	Team	Apps	(Gls)
2011	Själevads IK	21	(4)
2012–2013	Sunnanå SK	44	(5)
2014–2016	KIF Örebro DFF	15	(0)
2016	Fiorentina	4	(0)
2017	Umeå IK	24	(2)
2018–2019	Åland United	40	(5)
2020–	AIK	24	(6)
- * Club domestic league appearances and goals as of July 2, 2020

Sara Nordin (born 26 March 1993) is a Swedish football defender who plays in Damallsvenskan for AIK and previously for KIF Örebro DFF, Fiorentina, and Umeå IK.

== Honours ==
KIF Örebro DFF

Runner-up

- Damallsvenskan: 2014
