= Juan Cifré =

Spanish footballer

Personal information
- Full name: Juan Cifré Navas
- Date of birth: 26 May 1993 (age 33)
- Place of birth: Palma, Spain
- Height: 1.74 m (5 ft 8 1/2 in)
- Position: Right back

Team information
- Current team: Santanyí

Youth career
- Mallorca

Senior career*
Years	Team	Apps	(Gls)
2012–2015	Mallorca B	57	(0)
2012–2013	→ Llosetense (loan)	30	(0)
2015	Mallorca	1	(0)
2015–2017	Sporting B	43	(2)
2018	Poblense	15	(1)
2018–2019	Formentera	21	(2)
2019–2020	Poblense	6	(0)
2021	Felanitx	18	(1)
2021–2025	Poblense	76	(2)
2025–	Santanyí	3	(2)
- * Club domestic league appearances and goals as of 28 September 2025

Juan Cifré Navas (born 26 May 1993) is a Spanish footballer who plays as a right back for Tercera Federación club Santanyí.

== Club career ==
Born in Palma, Majorca, Cifré graduated from local RCD Mallorca's youth system, and made his senior debuts while on loan at CD Llosetense in the 2012–13 campaign, in Tercera División. He returned to the Bermellones in the 2013 summer, and was assigned to the reserves also in the fourth level.

Cifré made his first team debut on 24 May 2015, starting in a 2–4 away loss against Albacete Balompié in the Segunda División. On 20 August he moved to another reserve team, Sporting de Gijón B in the Segunda División B.
