= Kelvin Ebuka Nwamora =

Nigerian footballer

Kelvin Nwamora
Personal information
- Full name: Kelvin Ebuka Nwamora
- Date of birth: 31 October 1993 (age 33)
- Place of birth: Enugu, Nigeria
- Height: 1.90 m (6 ft 3 in)
- Position: Striker

Senior career*
Years	Team	Apps	(Gls)
2014–2015	Kapfenberger SV	17	(2)
2015	Olimpik Donetsk	2	(0)
2016	Inhulets Petrove	19	(4)
- * Club domestic league appearances and goals as of 7 August 2018

Kelvin Ebuka Nwamora // (born 31 October 1993) is a Nigerian football striker.

== Career ==
Nwamora started his career when he was signed for Kapfenberger SV in the Austrian Football First League. Then in July 2015 he signed a contract with Ukrainian club Olimpik Donetsk and made his debut in the match against Karpaty Lviv on 1 August 2015 in the Ukrainian Premier League.

== Controversy ==
Before 2014 Nwamora played in Ukraine in the local amateur clubs and his birth date was 31 October 1988, but from 2015 his birth date is changed to 31 October 1993. He changed his birth date during playing time in Austria in 2014–2015.
