= Gullithi =

Brazilian footballer (born 1993)

Personal information
- Full name: Rudigullithi da Silva Henrique
- Date of birth: 8 October 1993 (age 33)
- Place of birth: Rio de Janeiro, Brazil
- Height: 1.93 m (6 ft 4 in)
- Position: Defender

Youth career
- 2011–2012: Fluminense

Senior career*
Years	Team	Apps	(Gls)
2013–2014	São José-RS	0	(0)
2015	Bagé	0	(0)
2016–2017	Aimoré	12	(0)
2017	Cruzeiro-RS	1	(0)
2018	São Paulo-RS	10	(0)
2018	América-RN	3	(0)
2018–2019	Arouca	2	(0)
2019–2020	Esportivo	29	(5)
2020–2021	Próspera	19	(0)
2021	Bagé	12	(1)
2022	Próspera	20	(0)
- * Club domestic league appearances and goals as of 23:52, 22 May 2019 (UTC)

Rudigullithi da Silva Henrique (born 8 October 1993), commonly known as Gullithi, is a Brazilian former footballer who played as a defender.

== Early life ==
Born in Rio de Janeiro, Rudigullithi was named after Ruud Gullit, as his father, José Luiz, was a big fan of Dutch football. Initially, he was going to be called in given name as "Van Basten", but this was vetoed by his mother.

== Career statistics ==
=== Club ===
As of 9 January 2019.

Club	Season	League			Cup		Other		Total	
Club	Season	Division	Apps	Goals	Apps	Goals	Apps	Goals	Apps	Goals
Aimoré	2017	–			0	0	12 (Note: Appearances in the Campeonato Gaúcho A2)	0	12	0
São Paulo-RS	2018	–			0	0	10 (Note: Appearances in the Campeonato Gaúcho)	0	10	0
América-RN	2018	Série D	3	0	0	0	0	0	3	0
Arouca	2018–19	LigaPro	2	0	0	0	0	0	2	0
América-RN	2019	Série D	0	0	0	0	0	0	0	0
Career total			5	0	0	0	22	0	27	0

== Honours ==
Próspera

- Campeonato Catarinense Série B: 2020
