= Palazzo Di Gregorio =

Building in Alcamo, Sicily

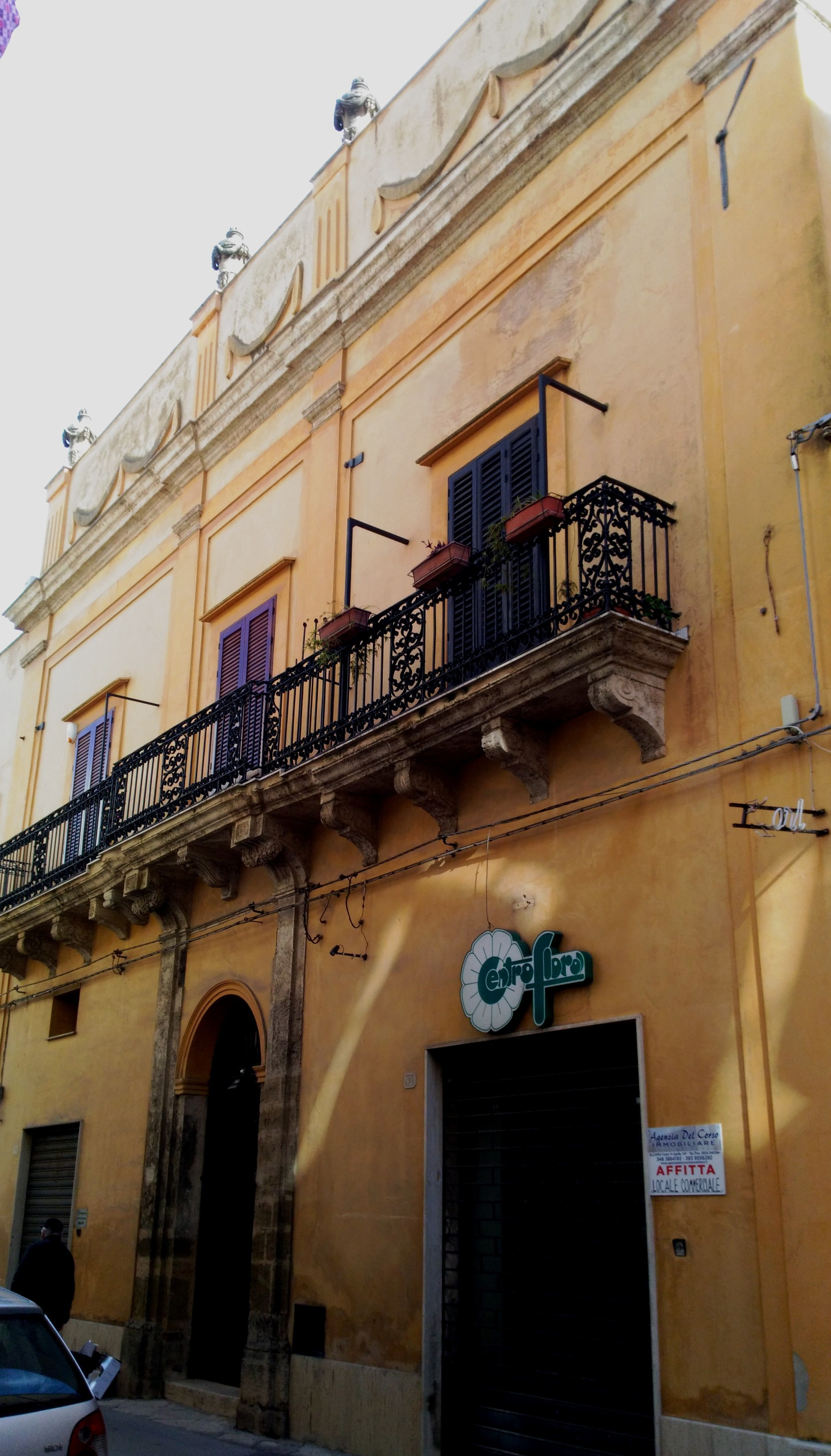
- Interactive map of the Palazzo Di Gregorio area

General information
- Architectural style: Neoclassical
- Location: Alcamo, Italy
- Coordinates: 37°58′52″N 12°57′47″E
- Construction started: 17th century
- Client: Di Gregorio family

Palazzo Di Gregorio is a building located at via Dante in Alcamo, in the province of Trapani; it was built at about the 17th century.

== Description ==
The imposing façade has a Neoclassical style; on the ground floor there are three openings: an entrance with an ogee arch, small cornices formed by several elements, and two rolling shutters leading into two big rooms.

The balcony on the first floor is very large, and its landings are supported by stone brackets, with decorations; the banister is made with wrought iron.

On the north side, in Via Arco Itria, there are four recent windows, four balconies on the first floor (two of them smaller and decorated); behind the main façade, in Via Stefano Polizzi, there are three front doors leading to some warehouses, and a small entrance leading to the second floor.

The whole façade ends with a cornice dominated by eight torch-standers: these decorative elements are similar to those of Palazzo Pastore, located in Corso 6 Aprile, and the other ones in the main façade of Mother church.

Since 1984 the building has belonged to the Noto brothers, who have restored it completely.

== Sources ==
- "Chiese e monumenti". Archived from the original on 2017-02-26.
- Roberto Calia: I Palazzi dell'aristocrazia e della borghesia alcamese; Alcamo, Carrubba, 1997
