= Matías Di Gregorio =

Argentine footballer (born 1986)

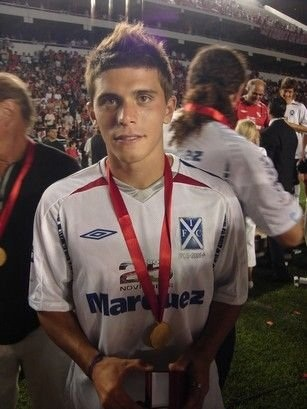
- Di Gregorio with Independiente in 2011

Personal information
- Full name: Matías Gabriel Di Gregorio
- Date of birth: 4 June 1986 (age 40)
- Place of birth: Buenos Aires, Argentina
- Height: 1.70 m (5 ft 7 in)
- Positions: Left back; left midfielder; winger

Youth career
- Independiente

Senior career*
Years	Team	Apps	(Gls)
2007–2011	Independiente	17	(2)
2009–2011	→ Quilmes (loan)	23	(1)
2011–2012	Atlético Rafaela	0	(0)
2012–2013	3 de Febrero	40	(8)
2014	Naval	6	(0)
2014–2015	Atlético Pinto	3	(0)
2020–2021	Inter Ibiza	10	(2)
- * Club domestic league appearances and goals

Matías Gabriel Di Gregorio (born 4 June 1986 in Buenos Aires) is an Argentine former football defender and midfielder.

== Club career ==
=== Independiente ===
Di Gregorio began his playing career in 2006 with Club Atletico Independiente, where he made his youthful career too. His debut was on 16 June 2007 in a 1–3 away win against Gimnasia de Jujuy. On 15 March 2008, he scored his first goal against Gimnasia La Plata in a 3–1 Independiente's victory at Primera División. He participated with a great performance on the tour of the United States and Canada, playing 3 games against Columbus Crew, Atlanta Silverbacks and Toronto FC.

=== Quilmes ===
In 2009, he dropped down a division to play for Quilmes Atlético Club in Primera B Nacional, playing 23 games, scoring a free kick in the first match of the league. He had a strong performance in the league, being protagonist in many games, achieving promotion of Quilmes Atlético Club to the Argentine Primera División.

=== Atlético Rafaela ===
In 2011, he signed for Atlético de Rafaela to play in Primera División.

=== 3 de Febrero ===
Di Gregorio signed in 2012 for 3 de Febrero, where he had his best year, playing 40 games and scoring 8 goals. He was one of the figures of the team during the league.

=== Naval de Talcahuano ===
Actually he plays for Naval de Talcahuano, in the Chilean Primera División B, constituting a fundamental piece for the team.

=== In Spain ===
In November 2014, it was confirmed, that Di Gregorio joined the Spanish side Atlético Pinto. In 2020–21, he also played for Inter Ibiza.
