= Juanjo Pereira =

Spanish footballer

Personal information
- Full name: Juan José Pereira Zambrano
- Date of birth: 19 March 1984 (age 42)
- Place of birth: Ontinyent, Spain
- Height: 1.80 m (5 ft 11 in)
- Position: Midfielder

Youth career
- Valencia

Senior career*
Years	Team	Apps	(Gls)
2002–2003	Valencia C		
2003–2004	Teruel		
2004–2005	Ontinyent		
2005	Extremadura		
2005–2007	Orihuela	45	(0)
2007–2008	Lanzarote	31	(2)
2008–2009	Orihuela	33	(1)
2009–2010	Cultural Leonesa	22	(1)
2010	Albacete	11	(0)
2010–2011	San Roque	34	(3)
2011–2012	Ceuta	29	(1)
2012–2013	Alcoyano	26	(0)
2013–2014	Ontinyent	27	(3)
2014–2015	Rayo Cantabria	28	(4)
2015–2016	Extremadura	43	(5)
- * Club domestic league appearances and goals

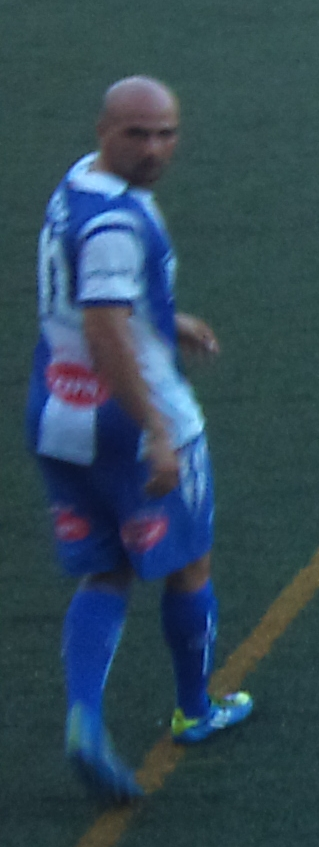
Juanjo Pereira in the kit of CD Alcoyano

Juan José 'Juanjo' Pereira Zambrano (born 19 March 1984) is a Spanish former footballer who played as a midfielder.

== Club career ==
Born in Ontinyent, Valencia, Pereira spent his first 8 seasons as a senior alternating between Segunda División B and Tercera División. He represented in the process Valencia CF C, CD Teruel, Ontinyent CF, CF Extremadura, Orihuela CF (two stints), UD Lanzarote and Cultural y Deportiva Leonesa.

On 1 February 2010 Pereira signed with Albacete Balompié, in Segunda División. He made his division debut on the 13th, in a 1–1 home draw against CD Castellón. He finished the season with 11 appearances (6 starts, 615 minutes of action).

Pereira returned to the lower levels in the following years, representing CD San Roque de Lepe, AD Ceuta, CD Alcoyano, Ontinyent, SD Rayo Cantabria and Extremadura UD.
