= Mario Pierani =

Argentine footballer

Personal information
- Full name: Mario Daniel Pierani Verstraete
- Date of birth: 25 July 1978 (age 48)
- Place of birth: Santa Isabel, Santa Fe, Argentina
- Height: 1.80 m (5 ft 11 in)
- Position: Forward

Youth career
- Juventud Unida VT

Senior career*
Years	Team	Apps	(Gls)
2000–2002	Juventud Unida VT	–	(–)
2002	General Belgrano SI	–	(–)
2002	Argentino de Rosario	17	(7)
2003	Cultura de Murphy	–	(–)
2003	Deportivo Español	0	(0)
2003–2004	Tiro Federal	17	(6)
2004	Basáñez	0	(0)
2005	Deportivo Colonia	0	(0)
2005–2006	Real Arroyo Seco	24	(9)
2006–2008	Central Córdoba Rosario	77	(19)
2009–2011	San Luis	98	(36)
2012–2014	Coquimbo Unido	88	(39)
2014	Everton	9	(1)
2015	Rangers	16	(2)
2016	Sportivo Rivadavia	18	(4)
Total		364	(123)
- * Club domestic league appearances and goals

Mario Daniel Pierani Verstraete (born 25 July 1978) is a former Argentine footballer. He had successful spells at San Luis de Quillota and Coquimbo Unido.

== Career ==
Born in Santa Isabel, Santa Fe, Argentina, Pierani began his football career with local semi-professional sides Juventud Unida de Venado Tuerto, General Belgrano de Santa Isabel, Argentino de Rosario and Cultura de Murphy. He continued to play for semi-professional clubs in Santa Fe Province, Argentina until 2009, in addition to stints with Uruguayan clubs Basáñez and Deportivo Colonia, when he moved to Chile.

After seven years in Chile, including one season in the Primera División with San Luis, Pierani returned to Argentina. He scored the goal that qualified Sportivo Rivadavia for the final stage of the 2015–16 Copa Argentina.

== Honours ==
=== Player ===
San Luis Quillota

- Primera B de Chile (1): 2009 Apertura

Coquimbo Unido

- Primera B de Chile (1): 2014 Clausura
