= Fran Zafra =

Spanish footballer (born 1993)

Personal information
- Full name: Francisco Javier Zafra de los Santos
- Date of birth: 28 March 1993 (age 33)
- Place of birth: Seville, Spain
- Height: 1.76 m (5 ft 9 in)
- Position: Midfielder

Team information
- Current team: Ceuta (on loan from San Fernando)

Youth career
- Portuense
- 2010–2012: Xerez

Senior career*
| Years | Team | Apps | (Gls) |
| 2009–2010 | Portuense | 12 | (0) |
| 2011–2013 | Xerez B | 19 | (2) |
| 2013 | Xerez | 1 | (0) |
| 2013–2014 | Córdoba B | 8 | (0) |
| 2014 | San Fernando | 14 | (1) |
| 2014–2015 | Sanluqueño | 38 | (4) |
| 2015–2016 | Villanovense | 5 | (0) |
| 2016–2017 | Arcos | 35 | (8) |
| 2017– | San Fernando | 0 | (0) |
| 2017– | → Ceuta (loan) | 18 | (0) |
- * Club domestic league appearances and goals as of 28 January 2018

Francisco 'Fran' Javier Zafra de los Santos (born 28 March 1993), is a Spanish footballer who plays for AD Ceuta on loan from San Fernando as a midfielder.

== Club career ==
Born in Seville, Andalusia, Zafra made his senior debuts with Racing Club Portuense, in the 2009–10 season, but returned to youth football, playing with Xerez CD. He was promoted to the club's B-team in the 2011–12 season, and made his first team debut on 20 April 2013, playing the last 24 minutes of a 1–2 home loss against UD Las Palmas in the Segunda División championship.

In August 2013 Zafra signed with Córdoba CF, being assigned to the reserves in Segunda División B. He subsequently resumed his career in the third level but also in Tercera División, representing San Fernando CD and Atlético Sanluqueño CF.
