= Juan Manuel Solano =

Colombian footballer (born 1993)

Juan Manuel Solano Vanegas (born 22 July 1993) is a Colombian professional footballer who plays as a midfielder.

== Clubs ==
- Bogotá FC 2010–2012
- Boyacá Chicó 2013
- Cortuluá 2013–2015
- Barnechea 2015–2016
