= Sergio De Gregorio =

Sergio De Gregorio may refer to:

- Sergio De Gregorio (politician) (born 1960), Italian politician and journalist
- Sergio De Gregorio (swimmer) (1946–1966), Italian swimmer
