= Mamadou Sylla (footballer, born 1986) =

Senegalese footballer

Personal information
- Date of birth: 22 February 1986 (age 40)
- Place of birth: Dakar, Senegal
- Position: Defender

Senior career*
Years	Team	Apps	(Gls)
2008–2010	RS Yoff		
2010–2016	US Ouakam		
2016–2017	ASC Diaraf		
2017–2018	Al Shabab Al Arabi	20	(0)
2018–2020	AC Tripoli	21	(0)
2020–	ASC Jaraaf		

International career
2016	Senegal	1	(0)
- * Club domestic league appearances and goals as of 22 November 2019

Mamadou Sylla (born 22 February 1986) is a Senegalese footballer who last plays as a defender for ASC Jaraaf. He has been capped once for Senegal.
