= Diego de Gregorio =

Chilean footballer (born 1986)

Personal information
- Full name: Diego Andrés de Gregorio Contreras
- Date of birth: 6 September 1986 (age 40)
- Place of birth: Santiago, Chile
- Height: 1.81 m (5 ft 11 in)
- Position: Forward

Youth career
- 2001–2004: Audax Italiano

Senior career*
Years	Team	Apps	(Gls)
2004–2007	Audax Italiano	5	(0)
2007	→ Deportes Melipilla (loan)	18	(4)
2008	Pandurii Târgu Jiu	0	(0)
2008	Deportes Melipilla	12	(5)
2009	Rangers	10	(3)
2009–2010	San Marcos	15	(4)
2011	Lota Schwager	7	(0)
2012	Barnechea	23	(4)
2013	Unión Temuco	1	(0)
2013	San Antonio Unido	17	(6)
2013	Trasandino	17	(8)
2014–2015	Santiago Morning	8	(1)
2015–2016	Cobreloa	2	(0)
2016	Barnechea	0	(0)
Total		135	(35)
- * Club domestic league appearances and goals

Diego Andrés de Gregorio Contreras (born 6 September 1986) is a Chilean former professional footballer who played as a forward.

== Career ==
De Gregorio started his career in 2004 with Audax Italiano. In 2007, he had a successful spell with Deportes Melipilla before returning to Audax Italiano. Next, he moved to Romania and joined Pandurii Târgu Jiu as a free agent in 2008.

His last club was Cobreloa.

== Personal life ==
He is the younger brother of the former footballer Pascual de Gregorio and uncle of Pascual Patricio, son of Pascual Sr., a footballer who has played at lower categories of both Chilean and Italian football.

== Honours ==
- Copa Chile top goalscorer: 2012–13
