= Martina Smilkovska =

Macedonian footballer

Personal information
- Date of birth: 22 October 1993 (age 33)
- Position: Defender

Team information
- Current team: Istatov

Senior career*
Years	Team	Apps	(Gls)
- Istatov

International career^{‡}
2011	North Macedonia U19	3	(0)
2011–2016	North Macedonia	12	(0)
- * Club domestic league appearances and goals ‡ National team caps and goals as of 15 September 2016

Martina Smilkovska (born 22 October 1993) is a Macedonian footballer who plays as a defender for 1. liga club ŽFK Istatov. She has been a member of the North Macedonia women's national team.
