= Nils Gottschick =

German footballer (born 1993)

Personal information
- Full name: Nils Fernando Gottschick
- Date of birth: 9 October 1993 (age 33)
- Place of birth: Berlin, Germany
- Height: 1.78 m (5 ft 10 in)
- Position: Midfielder

Team information
- Current team: FSV 63 Luckenwalde
- Number: 11

Youth career
- Berliner SV 1892
- –2003: Hertha Zehlendorf
- 2003–2012: Hertha BSC

Senior career*
| Years | Team | Apps | (Gls) |
| 2012 | Hertha BSC II | 5 | (0) |
| 2012–2014 | Germania Halberstadt | 32 | (11) |
| 2014–2015 | Energie Cottbus | 4 | (0) |
| 2014–2015 | Energie Cottbus II | 7 | (2) |
| 2015–2016 | Berliner AK | 16 | (1) |
| 2015–2016 | Berliner AK II | 1 | (1) |
| 2016 | TSG Neustrelitz | 14 | (0) |
| 2016–2019 | Lokomotive Leipzig | 64 | (6) |
| 2019– | FSV 63 Luckenwalde | 9 | (1) |
- * Club domestic league appearances and goals as of 21:50, 27 October 2019 (UTC)

Nils Fernando Gottschick (born 9 October 1993) is a German footballer who plays as a midfielder for FSV 63 Luckenwalde.

== Career ==
Gottschick made his professional debut for Energie Cottbus in the 3. Liga on 26 August 2014, coming on as a substitute in the 84th minute for Sven Michel in the 2–0 home win against Wehen Wiesbaden.
