= Mirza Jatić =

Austrian footballer

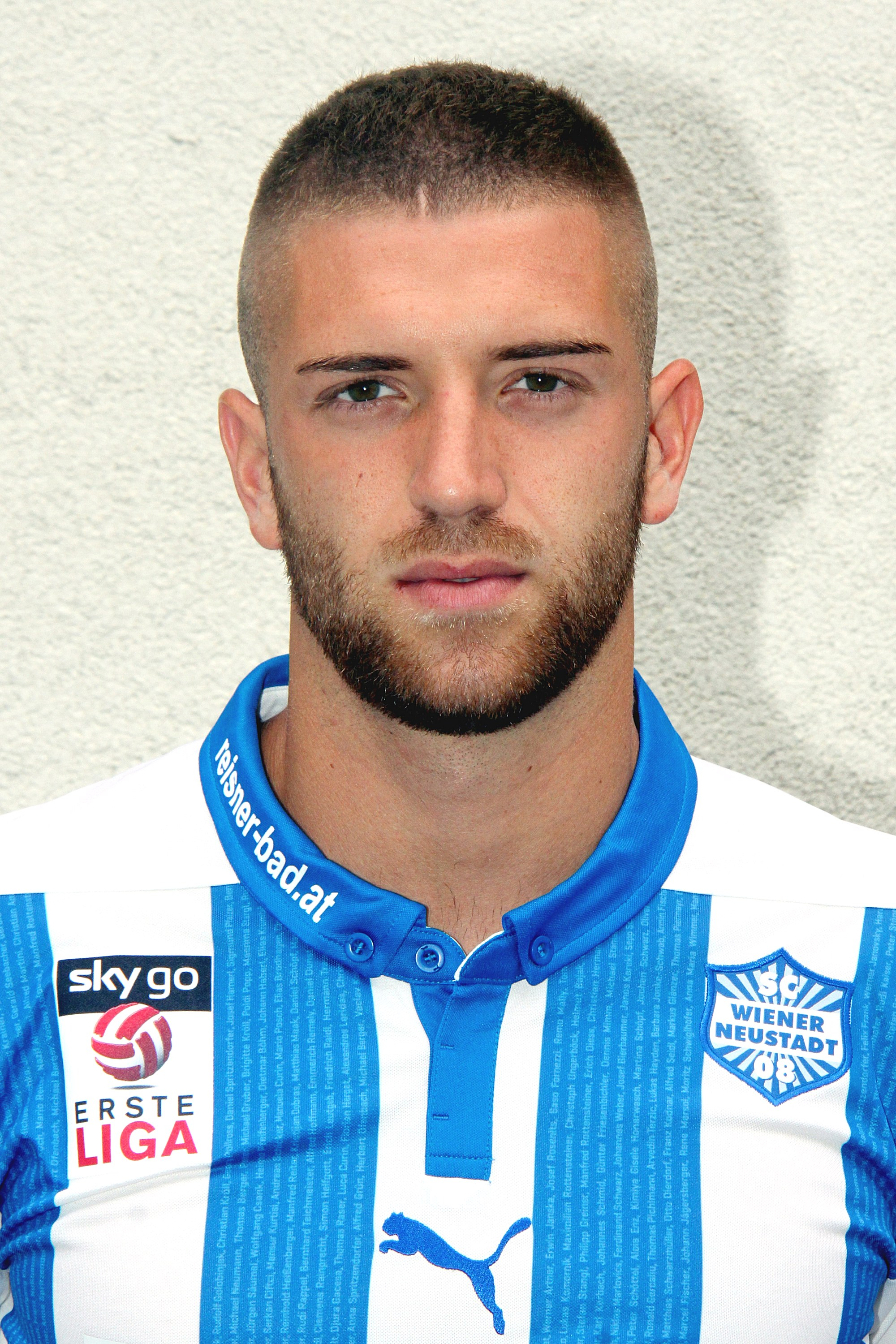
- Jatić with Wiener Neustadt in 2015

Personal information
- Date of birth: 1 July 1993 (age 33)
- Height: 1.81 m (5 ft 11 1/2 in)
- Position: Right back

Team information
- Current team: FCM Traiskirchen
- Number: 45

Senior career*
Years	Team	Apps	(Gls)
–2014	SV Gloggnitz		
2014–2015	ASK Eggendorf		
2015–2017	SC Wiener Neustadt	30	(0)
2019–	FCM Traiskirchen	28	(1)
- * Club domestic league appearances and goals as of 8 June 2020

Mirza Jatić (born 1 July 1993) is an Austrian football player who plays for FCM Traiskirchen.

== Club career ==
He made his Austrian Football First League debut for SC Wiener Neustadt on 18 September 2015 in a game against SC Austria Lustenau.

Jatic joined FCM Traiskirchen on 1 January 2019.
