= Kendra McMullan =

Northern Irish footballer

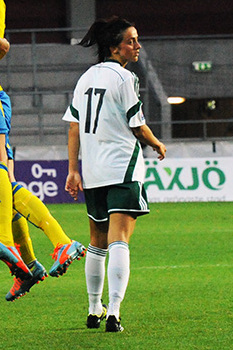

Personal information
- Date of birth: 26 May 1993 (age 33)
- Position: Midfielder

Senior career*
Years	Team	Apps	(Gls)
2012–2019	Sion Swifts		

International career^{‡}
- Northern Ireland
- * Club domestic league appearances and goals as of 19:46, 30 August 2019 (UTC) ‡ National team caps and goals as of 19:46, 30 August 2019 (UTC)

Kendra McMullan (born 26 May 1993) is a Northern Irish former footballer who played as a midfielder and appeared for the Northern Ireland women's national team.

== Career ==
Club captain McMullan won the IFA Women's Challenge Cup with Sion Swifts in 2017, scoring both goals in the 2–0 final win over Newry City at Windsor Park in Belfast. She retired from football aged 26 years old in August 2019, after suffering from injuries and illness.

McMullan was capped for the Northern Ireland national team, appearing for the team during the 2019 FIFA Women's World Cup qualifying cycle.
