= Elin Wahlström =

Swedish footballer (born 1993)

Personal information
- Full name: Elin Wahlström
- Date of birth: 20 January 1993 (age 33)
- Place of birth: Sweden
- Position: Midfielder

Senior career*
Years	Team	Apps	(Gls)
2011–2017	Eskilstuna United DFF	104	(3)
2017	AIK	13	(0)

International career
2013–2014	Sweden U23	2	(0)
- * Club domestic league appearances and goals as of 02:40, 18 May 2016 (UTC)

Elin Wahlström (born 20 January 1993) is a Swedish football midfielder who previously played for Swedish club Eskilstuna United. In August 2017, she signed for AIK in the Swedish Elitettan.
