= Pascual de Gregorio =

Chilean footballer and manager (born 1972)

Personal information
- Full name: Pascual Renato de Gregorio Contreras
- Date of birth: 5 March 1972 (age 54)
- Place of birth: Coronel, Chile
- Height: 1.82 m (6 ft 0 in)
- Position: Forward

Senior career*
Years	Team	Apps	(Gls)
1989	C.T.C.	–	(–)
1990–1992	Audax Italiano	44	(18)
1993	Provincial Osorno	0	(0)
1993	Deportes Melipilla	19	(0)
1994	Palestino	4	(0)
1995	Unión Santa Cruz	22	(11)
1996–1997	Rangers	55	(21)
1998	Santiago Morning	16	(6)
1998–1999	Coquimbo Unido	51	(21)
1999–2002	Bari	11	(0)
2002	Cobreloa	0	(0)
2003	Gansu Tianma	8	(3)
2003	Rangers	13	(6)
2004	Santiago Wanderers	7	(0)
2005	Unión San Felipe	21	(4)
Total		271	(90)

Managerial career
- 2014: Deportes Rengo
- * Club domestic league appearances and goals

Pascual Renato de Gregorio Contreras (Spanish pronunciation: [pasˈkwal de ɣɾeˈɣoɾjo], born 5 March 1972) is a Chilean former footballer who plays as a forward.

== Playing career ==
With a career in Chilean football, in 1999 De Gregorio moved to Italy and joined Serie A side A.S. Bari after a great step with Coquimbo Unido, where he played alongside the former Italy international footballers Simone Perrotta and Antonio Cassano. In addition, he played for Gansu Tianma in China.

== Coaching career ==
In 2014, he worked as the coach of Deportes Rengo in the Chilean Tercera A.

== Personal life ==
He is the older brother of Diego de Gregorio, who played as a forward for clubs like Audax Italiano, Deportes Melipilla (where Pascual played), Rangers, among others. His son, Pascual Patricio, is also a footballer who has played at lower categories of both Chilean and Italian football.

== Honours ==
Rangers

- Primera B: 1997 Apertura

Cobreloa

- Primera División de Chile: 2002 Apertura
