= Ömer Arslan =

Turkish footballer

Personal information
- Date of birth: 15 July 1993 (age 33)
- Place of birth: Tokat, Turkey
- Height: 1.83 m (6 ft 0 in)
- Position: Centre back

Youth career
- 2005–2008: Feriköy
- 2008–2013: Beşiktaş

Senior career*
Years	Team	Apps	(Gls)
2013–2014	Beşiktaş	0	(0)
2013–2014	→ Antalyaspor (loan)	1	(0)
2014–2016	Altay SK	42	(3)

International career
2012	Turkey U19	2	(0)
2013–	Turkey A2	2	(0)
- * Club domestic league appearances and goals as of 30 July 2015

Ömer Arslan (born 15 July 1993) is a Turkish footballer who plays as a centre-back.
