= Marcel Mosch =

German footballer

Personal information
- Date of birth: 20 May 1993 (age 33)
- Place of birth: Germany
- Height: 1.80 m (5 ft 11 in)
- Position: Striker

Team information
- Current team: Sportfreunde Siegen
- Number: 10

Youth career
- FSV Lieblos
- –2012: Kickers Offenbach

Senior career*
| Years | Team | Apps | (Gls) |
| 2012–2013 | Kickers Offenbach II | 43 | (10) |
| 2012–2014 | Kickers Offenbach | 22 | (1) |
| 2014–2015 | SV Seligenporten | 21 | (8) |
| 2015–2016 | Wacker Burghausen | 15 | (1) |
| 2016–2017 | SV Seligenporten | 31 | (6) |
| 2017–2018 | Borussia Fulda | 31 | (4) |
| 2018–2019 | SG Barockstadt | 25 | (6) |
| 2019–2020 | SG Johannesberg | 20 | (4) |
| 2020– | Sportfreunde Siegen | 37 | (5) |
- * Club domestic league appearances and goals as of 13 November 2022

Marcel Mosch (born 20 May 1993) is a German footballer who plays for Sportfreunde Siegen. He made his 3. Liga debut for the club in December 2012, as a substitute for Fabian Bäcker in a 1–0 home defeat against Hallescher FC.
