= Issiaka Koudize =

Nigerien footballer

Personal information
- Full name: Issiakou Koudizé Kalinatan
- Date of birth: 3 January 1987 (age 39)
- Place of birth: Niamey, Niger
- Height: 1.77 m (5 ft 10 in)
- Position: Centre midfielder

Senior career*
Years	Team	Apps	(Gls)
2009	Sahel SC		
2010	AS FAN		
2011–2013	AS GNN		
2013–2014	Coton Sport		
2015–2016	AS GNN		
2016–2018	AS NIGELEC		

International career
2011–2016	Niger	33	(1)
- * Club domestic league appearances and goals

Issiaka Koudize (born 3 January 1987) is a Nigerien footballer, who plays for the Cameroonian club Coton Sport in the Elite One. He was called into Niger national football team and played in all 3 matches of the 2012 Africa Cup of Nations as a reserve player.
