= Sebastián Pol =

Argentine-Chilean footballer (born 1988)

Personal information
- Full name: Marcos Sebastián Pol Gutiérrez
- Date of birth: 15 March 1988 (age 38)
- Place of birth: Tunuyán, Argentina
- Height: 1.78 m (5 ft 10 in)
- Position: Striker

Youth career
- 2001–2003: San Lorenzo
- 2004: Pachuca

Senior career*
Years	Team	Apps	(Gls)
2006–2007	Cartaginés	18	(7)
2007–2009	Dacia Mioveni	20	(5)
2010–2011	Guabirá	27	(14)
2011–2012	Real Potosí	19	(11)
2012–2013	Cobreloa	29	(13)
2013–2014	Santiago Wanderers	26	(8)
2014–2016	Audax Italiano	30	(8)
2016	→ San Marcos (loan)	7	(0)
2017	Coquimbo Unido	11	(4)
2017	Huracán Las Heras	11	(2)
2018	Deportes La Serena	25	(7)
2019	Deportes Valdivia	11	(11)
2019	O'Higgins	10	(5)
2020	Everton	22	(3)
2021–2022	Cobresal	16	(2)
2022–2023	Rangers	27	(4)
2024	San Martín Mendoza	8	(0)
2024	Deportes Rengo	11	(4)
Total		328	(108)
- * Club domestic league appearances and goals

Marcos Sebastián Pol Gutiérrez (Spanish pronunciation: [ˈmaɾkos seβasˈtjam ˈpol]; born 15 March 1988) is an Argentine naturalized Chilean former footballer who played as a striker.

== Career ==
Born in Tunuyán, Pol began playing football in San Lorenzo's youth ranks, and made his professional debut with Costa Rican Primera side Cartaginés in 2006. In August 2007, after an impressive season in Costa Rica, he joined Dacia Mioveni, in where he had a poor spell, and then he arrived to Bolivia, playing at Guabirá and Real Potosí. In 2012, Pol signed for Chilean powerhouse Cobreloa. Next, he moved to Primera División club Santiago Wanderers.

In February 2024, he returned to his country of birth and joined San Martín de Mendoza in the Torneo Federal A. In the second half of the same year, he returned to Chile and signed with Deportes Rengo in the Segunda División Profesional, his last club.

== Personal life ==
In 2019, Pol naturalized Chilean by residence.

== Post-retirement ==
Following his retirement, Pol settled in Mendoza, Argentina and graduated as a sport manager.
