= Matthew Rowell (South African soccer) =

South African soccer player

Personal information
- Date of birth: 9 February 1993 (age 33)
- Place of birth: Cape Town, South Africa
- Position: Defender

Youth career
- Ajax Cape Town

Senior career*
Years	Team	Apps	(Gls)
2013–	Ajax Cape Town	0	(0)
2014	→ Engen Santos (loan)	10	(1)
2014–2016	Vasco Da Gama	44	(0)
2016–2017	Stellenbosch	19	(0)
- * Club domestic league appearances and goals

Matthew Rowell (born 9 February 1993) is a South African soccer player who plays as a defender for Ajax Cape Town in the South African Premier Soccer League.
