= Gilbrano Plet =

Dutch footballer (born 1993)

Personal information
- Full name: Gilbrano Plet
- Date of birth: 5 March 1993 (age 33)
- Place of birth: Amsterdam, Netherlands
- Height: 1.77 m (5 ft 9 1/2 in)
- Position: Winger

Team information
- Current team: Spakenburg

Youth career
- FC Omniworld

Senior career*
Years	Team	Apps	(Gls)
2011–2014	Almere City	22	(2)
2014–	Spakenburg	0	(0)
- * Club domestic league appearances and goals as of 8 August 2014 (UTC)

Gilbrano Plet (born 5 March 1993 in Amsterdam) is a Dutch professional footballer who currently plays as a winger for Spakenburg in the Dutch Topklasse. He formerly played for Almere City.
