= Ibou Cissé =

French footballer (born 1996)

Personal information
- Full name: François Ibou Cissé
- Date of birth: 2 November 1996 (age 30)
- Place of birth: Massy, France
- Height: 1.73 m (5 ft 8 in)
- Position: Midfielder

Team information
- Current team: Beauvais

Youth career
- 2012–2016: Paris FC

Senior career*
Years	Team	Apps	(Gls)
2015–2018	Paris FC II	59	(12)
2016–2018	Paris FC	14	(1)
2018–	Beauvais	24	(8)
- * Club domestic league appearances and goals as of 1 July 2019

François Ibou Cissé (born 2 November 1996) is a French professional footballer who plays as a midfielder for AS Beauvais Oise.

== Professional career ==
Cissé is a youth product of the academy of Paris FC, and in the 2016–17 season represented the senior team in the Championnat National. He made his professional debut for the club in a 2–0 Coupe de la Ligue loss to Clermont Foot on 22 August 2017.

== Personal life ==
Born in France, Cissé is of Malian descent.
