= Juraj Maretić =

Croatian footballer

Personal information
- Date of birth: 5 June 1993 (age 33)
- Place of birth: Split, Croatia
- Height: 1.87 m (6 ft 1 1/2 in)
- Position: Forward

Team information
- Current team: Junak Sinj

Youth career
- 2003–2005: Dalmatinac Split
- 2005–2008: Omladinac Vranjic
- 2008–2011: RNK Split
- 2011–2012: Slaven Belupo

Senior career*
Years	Team	Apps	(Gls)
2012–2013	Slaven Belupo	4	(0)
2012	→ Junak Sinj (loan)	0	(0)
2013	Hrvace		
2014	Imotski	1	(0)
2014-	Urania		
- * Club domestic league appearances and goals as of 11 August 2012

Juraj Maretić (born 5 June 1993 in Split) is a Croatian football forward, currently playing for Junak Sinj in the Druga HNL, on loan from Slaven Belupo.
