= Juanjo Muko Nsue =

Equatoguinean footballer and stylist

Juanjo Mouko
Personal information
- Full name: Juan José Mouko Nsue
- Date of birth: 14 January 1993 (age 33)
- Place of birth: Malabo, Equatorial Guinea
- Position: Forward

Youth career
- 2009–2012: Atlético Madrid

Senior career*
Years	Team	Apps	(Gls)
2013	Whyteleafe		
2013	Farnborough	2	(0)
2014	Arlesey Town	11	(3)

International career^{‡}
2011	Equatorial Guinea	4	(0)
- * Club domestic league appearances and goals as of 26 April 2014 ‡ National team caps and goals as of 11 October 2011

Juan José "Juanjo" Mouko Nsue (also spelt Juanjose Mouko Nsue) (born 14 January 1993) is an Equatorial Guinean fashion stylist and former footballer who played as a forward for the Equatorial Guinea national team. He is based in London, England and Paris, France.

== Club career ==
After graduate from Atlético Madrid, he moved to England. There, he played at Arlesey Town in the Southern League Premier Division after playing for Farnborough and Whyteleafe.

== International career ==
Juanjo was called by the Equatoguinean senior national team for the first time in October 2010 for a friendly match against Botswana. However, he was unable to attend.

Juanjo made his debut on 8 February 2011, when he played a friendly match against Chad.
