= Martić =

Martić (pronounced [mâːrtitɕ]) is a Croatian surname. Notable people with the surname include:

- Anđelka Martić (1924–2020), Croatian writer
- Grga Martić (1822–1905), Croatian writer
- Milan Martić (born 1954), Croatian politician
- Pavao Martić (born 1940), Croatian rower
- Petra Martić (born 1991), Croatian tennis player
- Tonči Martić (born 1972), Croatian former footballer

== See also ==
- Maretić
- Martic
