= Óscar Hernández (footballer, born 1993) =

Chilean footballer

Personal information
- Full name: Óscar Ignacio Hernández Polanco
- Date of birth: 7 March 1994 (age 32)
- Place of birth: Santiago, Chile
- Height: 1.78 m (5 ft 10 in)
- Position: Midfielder

Team information
- Current team: Marcos Trincado

Youth career
- Unión Española

Senior career*
Years	Team	Apps	(Gls)
2011–2017	Unión Española	72	(6)
2012–2014	Unión Española B	22	(3)
2014–2015	→ Barnechea (loan)	20	(2)
2017–2018	Atlético San Luis	14	(0)
2018–2019	Deportes Antofagasta	15	(0)
2019	Deportes Puerto Montt	9	(0)
2020–2021	Deportes Linares	10	(0)
2021–2022	Fernández Vial	33	(0)
2023–2024	Cultural Esfuerzo	–	(–)
2024–	Marcos Trincado	–	(–)

International career
2013	Chile U20	3	(0)
- * Club domestic league appearances and goals as of 2 June 2024

Óscar Ignacio Hernández Polanco (born 7 March 1994) is a Chilean footballer who plays as a midfielder. He currently plays for Marcos Trincado in the 2024 Copa Chile.

== Club career ==
In 2021, Hernández signed with Fernández Vial in the Primera B de Chile. He played for them until the end of the 2022 season.

In 2023, Hernández joined the amateur club Cultural Esfuerzo from Peñalolén commune, winning the regional night championship. In March 2024, he joined Marcos Trincado from Rengo commune, winning the regional championship and getting a place in the 2024 Copa Chile.

== International career ==
He represented Chile U20 at the 2013 FIFA U-20 World Cup by replacing Ignacio Caroca in the final squad, making three appearances.

== Personal life ==
At the same time he played for Cultural Esfuerzo, he worked as a seller of thermal panel windows.

== Honours ==
Unión Española

- Primera División (1): 2013–T
- Supercopa de Chile (1): 2013
