= Taulant Kadrija =

Slovenian footballer

Personal information
- Full name: Taulant Kadrija
- Date of birth: 18 May 1993 (age 33)
- Place of birth: Slovenia
- Position: Defender

Youth career
- Bilje
- Gorica

Senior career*
Years	Team	Apps	(Gls)
2012–2014	Gorica	21	(1)
2013–2014	→ Brda (loan)	13	(1)
2015–2016	Radnik Bijeljina	5	(0)
2016–2017	Brda	13	(1)
2017–2020	Primorje	38	(4)
- * Club domestic league appearances and goals as of 11 October 2017

Taulant Kadrija (born 18 May 1993) is a Slovenian footballer who most recently played for Primorje.
