= Hemiliano =

Bissau-Guinean footballer (born 1993)

Personal information
- Full name: Hemiliano Gomes Lopes
- Date of birth: 23 November 1993 (age 32)
- Place of birth: Bissau, Guinea-Bissau
- Height: 1.80 m (5 ft 11 in)
- Position: Forward

Team information
- Current team: SL Cartaxo

Youth career
- 2011–2012: Ribeirão

Senior career*
Years	Team	Apps	(Gls)
2012–2013	Arouca	3	(0)
2013–2014	Elvas	13	(2)
2014–2015	Caldas	13	(1)
2015	Mafra	10	(2)
2015	Torreense	13	(3)
2016	Loures		
2016–2017	Gobelins		
2017–2018	Eléctrico	17	(2)
2019–	SL Cartaxo		
- * Club domestic league appearances and goals as of 20 February 2019

Hemiliano Gomes Lopes (born 23 November 1993), known simply as Hemiliano, is a Bissau-Guinean footballer who plays for Portuguese club SL Cartaxo as a forward.

== Career ==
Born in Bissau, Hemiliano started playing organized football at already 18, with G.D. Ribeirão for his last year as a junior. In 2012, he joined F.C. Arouca also in Portugal, making his debut as a professional on 14 October 2012 as he appeared as a late substitute in a 1–0 home win against C.D. Trofense, for the season's Portuguese Cup.

Hemiliano played his first match in the second division on 30 December 2012, starting in a 1–1 draw at C.F. União.
