= 2018 Campeonato Nacional Primera División =

Campeonato Nacional
- Season: 2018
- Dates: 2 February – 2 December 2018
- Champions: Universidad Católica (13th title)
- Relegated: Deportes Temuco; San Luis
- Copa Libertadores: Universidad Católica; Universidad de Concepción; Universidad de Chile; Palestino (cup winners)
- Copa Sudamericana: Deportes Antofagasta; Colo-Colo; Unión La Calera; Unión Española
- Matches: 240
- Goals: 619 (2.58 per match)
- Best player: Luciano Aued
- Top goalscorer: Esteban Paredes (19 goals)
- Best goalkeeper: Matías Dituro
- Biggest home win: Unión La Calera 6–1 U. de Chile (22 April)
- Biggest away win: Dep. Temuco 0–4 Dep. Iquique (6 April); Dep. Temuco 0–4 Huachipato (21 September); Unión La Calera 0–4 Everton (22 September)
- Highest scoring: Curicó Unido 4–4 Unión Española (26 February)
- Highest attendance: 45,503; U. de Chile 0–0 Dep. Iquique (25 November)
- Total attendance: 1,716,462
- Average attendance: 7,152

The 2018 Campeonato Nacional, known as Campeonato Nacional Scotiabank 2018 for sponsorship purposes, was the 88th season of top-flight football in Chile. The season started on 2 February and ended on 2 December. Colo-Colo were the defending champions, having won the 2017 Transición tournament. Universidad Católica won their thirteenth title on the last day of the season following a 2–1 win at Deportes Temuco, who were relegated to the second tier with this defeat.

== Format changes ==
For the 2018 season, the Asociación Nacional de Fútbol Profesional (ANFP) approved a change of format from the Apertura-Clausura system that had been used in previous seasons, to a single tournament during the calendar year. The 16 teams played each other twice (once at home and once away) for a total of 30 matches. Qualification for the Copa Libertadores and Copa Sudamericana was awarded to the top seven teams at the end of the season, as well as the Copa Chile champions, while the bottom two teams were automatically relegated.

== Teams ==
=== Stadia and locations ===
Locations of the 2018 Chilean Primera División teams.

Team	City	Stadium
Audax Italiano	Santiago (La Florida)	Bicentenario de La Florida^{a}
Colo-Colo	Santiago (Macul)	Monumental David Arellano
Curicó Unido	Curicó	La Granja
Deportes Antofagasta	Antofagasta	Calvo y Bascuñán
Deportes Iquique	Iquique	Cavancha^{b}
Deportes Temuco	Temuco	Germán Becker
Everton	Viña del Mar	Sausalito
Huachipato	Talcahuano	Huachipato-CAP Acero
O'Higgins	Rancagua	El Teniente
Palestino	Santiago (La Cisterna)	Municipal de La Cisterna
San Luis	Quillota	Lucio Fariña Fernández^{c}
Unión Española	Santiago (Independencia)	Santa Laura-Universidad SEK
Unión La Calera	La Calera	Lucio Fariña Fernández^{d}
Universidad Católica	Santiago (Las Condes)	San Carlos de Apoquindo
Universidad de Chile	Santiago (Ñuñoa)	Nacional Julio Martínez Prádanos
Universidad de Concepción	Concepción	Alcaldesa Ester Roa Rebolledo

a: Audax Italiano played their home matches against Deportes Temuco and Everton at Estadio Municipal de La Pintana and Estadio El Teniente in Rancagua due to pitch renovation works at Estadio Bicentenario de La Florida.
b: Deportes Iquique played their home matches against Universidad de Chile, Universidad Católica, and Colo-Colo at Estadio Zorros del Desierto in Calama.
c: San Luis played their home matches against Deportes Temuco, O'Higgins, and Unión Española at Estadio Elías Figueroa Brander in Valparaíso due to pitch renovation works at Estadio Municipal Lucio Fariña Fernández.
d: Unión La Calera temporarily play their home matches at Estadio Municipal Lucio Fariña Fernández in Quillota due to remodeling works at Estadio Municipal Nicolás Chahuán Nazar. They played their home matches against Colo-Colo, Palestino, and Universidad Católica at Estadio Sausalito in Viña del Mar due to pitch renovation works at Estadio Municipal Lucio Fariña Fernández.

=== Personnel and kits ===
Team	Head coach	Captain	Kit manufacturer	Sponsors
Audax Italiano	(Chile) Juan José Ribera	(Chile) Nicolás Peric	Macron	Traverso
Colo-Colo	(Chile) Héctor Tapia	(Chile) Esteban Paredes	Under Armour	MG Motor
Curicó Unido	(Chile) Jaime Vera	(Argentina) Martín Cortés	Onefit	Multihogar
Deportes Antofagasta	(Argentina) Gerardo Ameli	(Chile) Gonzalo Villagra	Cafu	Minera Escondida
Deportes Iquique	(Chile) Luis Musrri	(Chile) Rodrigo Naranjo	Rete	UNAP
Deportes Temuco	(Chile) Miguel Ponce	(Chile) Cristián Canío	Joma	Rosen
Everton	(Argentina) Javier Torrente	(Chile) Marcos Velásquez	Pirma	Fox Sports
Huachipato	(Argentina) Nicolás Larcamón	(Chile) Claudio Sepúlveda	Mitre	PF
O'Higgins	(Chile) Marco Antonio Figueroa	(Chile) Albert Acevedo	Adidas	VTR
Palestino	(Chile) Ivo Basay	(Chile) Diego Rosende	Training	Bank of Palestine
San Luis	(Chile) Mauricio Riffo	(Chile) Daniel Vicencio	Capelli Sport	PF
Unión Española	(Chile) Fernando Díaz (caretaker)	(Chile) Diego Sánchez	Kappa	Universidad SEK
Unión La Calera	(Argentina) Francisco Meneghini	(Chile) Lucas Giovini	KS7	PF
Universidad Católica	(Spain) Beñat San José	(Chile) Cristian Álvarez	Umbro	DirecTV
Universidad de Chile	(Argentina) Frank Kudelka	(Chile) Johnny Herrera	Adidas	Chevrolet
Universidad de Concepción	(Chile) Francisco Bozán	(Argentina) Alejandro Camargo	KS7	Universidad de Concepción

=== Managerial changes ===
Team	Outgoing manager	Manner of departure	Date of vacancy	Position in table	Incoming manager	Date of appointment
Universidad Católica	(Chile) Mario Salas	Mutual consent	10 December 2017	Pre-season	(Spain) Beñat San José	20 December 2017
Huachipato	(Argentina) César Vigevani	Mutual consent	13 December 2017	Pre-season	(Argentina) Nicolás Larcamón	4 January 2018
Deportes Antofagasta	(Argentina) Nicolás Larcamón	Resigned	25 December 2017	Pre-season	(Argentina) Gerardo Ameli	4 January 2018
Deportes Iquique	(Chile) Erick Guerrero	Sacked	26 February 2018	12th	(Chile) Miguel Riffo	26 February 2018
Audax Italiano	(Chile) Hugo Vilches	Mutual consent	13 April 2018	16th	(Chile) Juan José Ribera	14 April 2018
Colo-Colo	(Argentina) Pablo Guede	Resigned	19 April 2018	4th	(Chile) Agustín Salvatierra (caretaker)	19 April 2018
Colo-Colo	(Chile) Agustín Salvatierra	End of caretaker spell	24 April 2018	4th	(Chile) Héctor Tapia	24 April 2018
Universidad de Chile	(Argentina) Ángel Guillermo Hoyos	Sacked	27 April 2018	2nd	(Chile) Esteban Valencia (caretaker)	27 April 2018
Palestino	(Argentina) Germán Cavalieri	Resigned	18 May 2018	10th	(Argentina) Sebastián Méndez	19 May 2018
Universidad de Chile	(Chile) Esteban Valencia	End of caretaker spell	26 May 2018	4th	(Argentina) Frank Kudelka	27 May 2018
San Luis	(Chile) Miguel Ramírez	Resigned	26 May 2018	14th	(Argentina) Diego Osella	5 June 2018
Everton	(Argentina) Pablo Sánchez	Sacked	27 May 2018	16th	(Argentina) Javier Torrente	2 June 2018
Curicó Unido	(Chile) Luis Marcoleta	Resigned	11 June 2018	12th	(Chile) Jaime Vera	14 June 2018
Deportes Temuco	(Argentina) Dalcio Giovagnoli	Sacked	16 June 2018	13th	(Chile) Miguel Ponce	22 June 2018
O'Higgins	(Argentina) Gabriel Milito	Mutual consent	20 June 2018	8th	(Uruguay) Mauricio Larriera	30 June 2018
O'Higgins	(Uruguay) Mauricio Larriera	Sacked	24 September 2018	9th	(Chile) Marco Antonio Figueroa	26 September 2018
San Luis	(Argentina) Diego Osella	Resigned	1 October 2018	16th	(Chile) Mauricio Riffo	3 October 2018
Palestino	(Argentina) Sebastián Méndez	Resigned	8 October 2018	14th	(Chile) Ivo Basay	9 October 2018
Deportes Iquique	(Chile) Miguel Riffo	Mutual consent	10 October 2018	11th	(Chile) Luis Musrri	12 October 2018
Unión Española	(Argentina) Martín Palermo	Sacked	4 November 2018	8th	(Chile) Fernando Díaz (caretaker)	4 November 2018
Unión La Calera	(Chile) Víctor Rivero	Sacked	6 November 2018	5th	(Argentina) Francisco Meneghini	8 November 2018

== Standings ==
Pos	Team	Pld	W	D	L	GF	GA	GD	Pts	Qualification
1	Universidad Católica (C)	30	17	10	3	39	25	+14	61	Qualification to Copa Libertadores group stage
2	Universidad de Concepción	30	18	4	8	44	31	+13	58	Qualification to Copa Libertadores group stage
3	Universidad de Chile	30	18	3	9	46	37	+9	57	Qualification to Copa Libertadores second stage
4	Deportes Antofagasta	30	14	11	5	48	33	+15	53	Qualification to Copa Sudamericana first stage
5	Colo-Colo	30	12	7	11	40	38	+2	43	Qualification to Copa Sudamericana first stage
6	Unión La Calera	30	13	4	13	38	38	0	43	Qualification to Copa Sudamericana first stage
7	Unión Española	30	9	14	7	44	42	+2	41	Qualification to Copa Sudamericana first stage
8	O'Higgins	30	12	5	13	41	41	0	41	
9	Huachipato	30	10	9	11	39	32	+7	39	
10	Audax Italiano	30	8	10	12	40	40	0	34	
11	Everton	30	9	7	14	39	44	−5	34	
12	Curicó Unido	30	8	10	12	35	40	−5	34	
13	Palestino	30	7	11	12	41	45	−4	32	Qualification to Copa Libertadores second stage (Note: Palestino qualified for the Copa Libertadores second stage by winning the 2018 Copa Chile.)
14	Deportes Iquique	30	7	11	12	34	42	−8	32	
15	Deportes Temuco (R)	30	6	10	14	29	45	−16	28	Relegation to Primera B
16	San Luis (R)	30	5	8	17	24	48	−24	23	Relegation to Primera B

Source: ANFP, Soccerway
Rules for classification: 1) Points, 2) Goal difference, 3) Matches won, 4) Goals for, 5) Away goals for, 6) Red cards, 7) Yellow cards, 8) Drawing of lots.
In case there are two teams tied in points for first place: 2) Playoff game.
(C) Champions; (R) Relegated

== Results ==
Home \ Away	AUD	CC	CUR	ANT	DIQ	TEM	EVE	HUA	OHI	PAL	SL	UE	ULC	UC	UCH	UDC
Audax Italiano	—	1–1	4–1	0–0	3–1	1–1	1–0	2–4	1–2	3–1	1–1	1–1	4–0	0–0	2–3	4–1
Colo-Colo	3–2	—	2–0	3–4	0–0	2–0	3–1	2–1	1–1	0–0	3–2	1–1	0–2	1–0	1–0	0–2
Curicó Unido	3–0	0–0	—	3–4	0–0	1–1	3–1	2–1	1–0	0–0	1–0	4–4	2–0	1–3	1–2	1–0
Deportes Antofagasta	1–1	1–2	2–0	—	2–1	3–2	3–2	0–0	3–2	1–0	1–0	1–1	0–2	1–1	4–0	1–0
Deportes Iquique	1–1	2–1	2–2	0–2	—	2–1	1–1	2–0	3–1	2–1	2–2	0–1	0–1	0–1	1–2	1–3
Deportes Temuco	2–1	1–0	1–2	1–1	0–4	—	1–1	0–4	0–1	3–2	2–2	2–0	0–2	1–2	0–1	1–1
Everton	1–0	4–2	1–1	3–2	2–3	2–2	—	0–0	0–1	3–0	2–1	1–1	1–3	0–1	0–1	1–0
Huachipato	1–0	1–2	1–0	0–0	2–2	0–0	2–0	—	0–1	1–1	1–1	1–1	2–0	3–0	0–1	3–0
O'Higgins	4–0	1–1	2–2	0–3	2–1	2–0	1–2	2–1	—	2–2	4–0	1–1	2–3	0–1	0–1	4–2
Palestino	1–1	2–1	2–1	1–1	5–1	1–1	2–1	3–0	2–3	—	0–1	1–1	1–2	2–2	1–3	1–2
San Luis	0–0	1–0	1–0	1–1	0–0	1–2	1–2	2–4	2–0	0–1	—	0–2	1–2	1–1	1–2	0–3
Unión Española	2–4	3–2	2–1	1–1	0–0	2–1	2–2	2–1	2–0	2–2	4–0	—	1–1	1–1	1–4	2–3
Unión La Calera	1–0	1–2	0–0	1–3	1–0	0–1	0–4	0–2	4–0	1–1	0–1	1–0	—	2–2	6–1	1–3
Universidad Católica	1–0	1–0	2–1	0–0	2–2	2–1	2–1	3–1	1–0	2–1	2–1	3–1	1–0	—	1–1	1–0
Universidad de Chile	1–2	1–3	2–1	2–0	0–0	2–1	2–0	2–2	1–0	1–2	3–0	1–2	1–0	2–0	—	1–2
Universidad de Concepción	1–0	2–1	0–0	3–2	3–0	0–0	2–0	1–0	0–2	3–2	2–0	1–0	2–1	0–0	3–1	—

Source: ANFP, Soccerway
Legend: Blue = home team win; Yellow = draw; Red = away team win.

== Top goalscorers ==
Rank	Name	Club	Goals
1	(Chile) Esteban Paredes	Colo-Colo	19
2	(Panama) Gabriel Torres	Huachipato	15
3	(Chile) Matías Campos López	Palestino	14
3	(Argentina) Tobías Figueroa	Unión Española	14
5	(Venezuela) Eduard Bello	Deportes Antofagasta	13
6	(Chile) Patricio Rubio	Everton	12
7	(Paraguay) Mauro Caballero	San Luis	11
7	(Argentina) Brian Fernández	Unión La Calera	11
7	(Chile) Javier Parraguez	Huachipato	11
10	(Argentina) Ricardo Blanco	Curicó Unido	9
10	(Brazil) Sergio Santos	Audax Italiano	9

Source: Soccerway

== Attendances ==
No.	Club	Average
1	Universidad de Chile	30,031
2	Colo-Colo	21,342
3	Universidad Católica	10,745
4	Deportes Temuco	7,030
5	Everton	6,649
6	O'Higgins	6,213
7	Universidad de Concepción	5,196
8	Deportes Antofagasta	4,128
9	Unión Española	3,688
10	Curicó Unido	3,670
11	Unión La Calera	3,139
12	San Luis	2,719
13	Audax Italiano	2,688
14	Huachipato	2,419
15	Deportes Iquique	2,591
16	Palestino	2,386
