= 2025 Liga de Primera =

Liga de Primera Itaú
- Season: 2025
- Dates: 14 February – 7 December 2025
- Champions: Coquimbo Unido (1st title)
- Relegated: Deportes Iquique; Unión Española
- Copa Libertadores: Coquimbo Unido; Universidad Católica; O'Higgins; Huachipato (via Copa Chile)
- Copa Sudamericana: Universidad de Chile; Audax Italiano; Palestino; Cobresal
- Matches: 240
- Goals: 635 (2.65 per match)
- Top goalscorer: Fernando Zampedri (16 goals)
- Biggest home win: U. Católica 6–0 Everton (25 April); U. de Chile 6–0 O'Higgins (31 May)
- Biggest away win: Dep. Iquique 0–4 Unión Española (16 March); Unión La Calera 0–4 U. de Chile (28 July)
- Highest scoring: Audax Italiano 4–3 Huachipato (26 May); Unión Española 3–4 Audax Italiano (13 September); Audax Italiano 4–3 Unión La Calera (17 October); U. de Chile 4–3 Dep. Limache (9 November)
- Total attendance: 1,759,565
- Average attendance: 7,332

The 2025 Liga de Primera, known as Liga de Primera Itaú 2025 for sponsorship purposes, was the 95th season of the Liga de Primera, Chile's top-flight football league. The season began on 14 February and ended on 7 December 2025.

Coquimbo Unido were the champions, winning their first Primera División title in this season. They clinched the championship with four matches to go after defeating Unión La Calera 2–0 on 2 November 2025. Colo-Colo were the defending champions.

== Teams ==
Locations of the 2025 Liga de Primera teams.
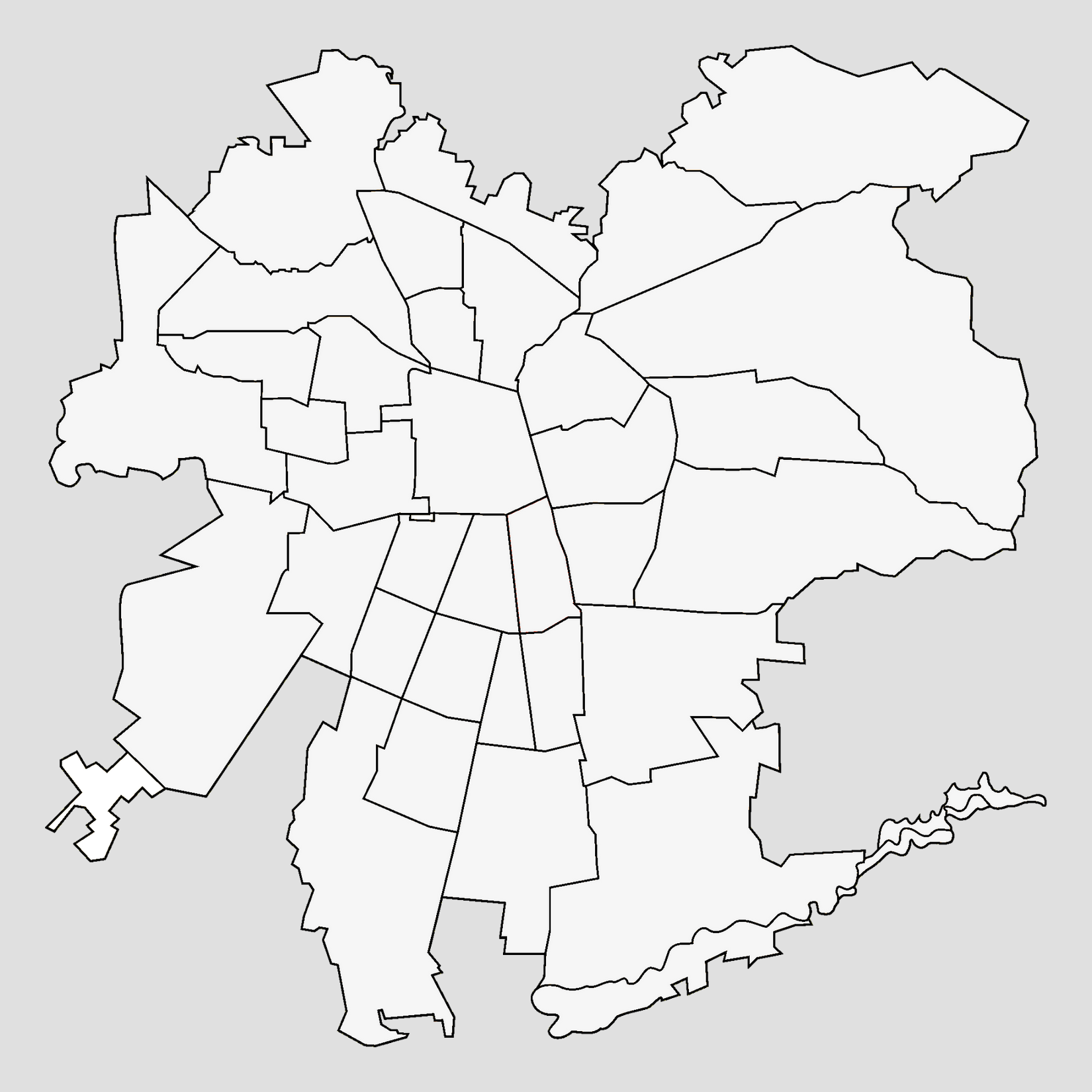
Locations of the 2025 Liga de Primera teams – Santiago.

Sixteen teams take part in the league in this season: the top 14 teams from the 2024 tournament, plus the 2024 Primera B champions Deportes La Serena and Deportes Limache, winners of the promotion play-offs. La Serena secured promotion to the top tier after two years on 29 September 2024, winning the Primera B tournament with a 1–0 win over Deportes Recoleta. Meanwhile, Deportes Limache achieved a first-ever promotion to Primera División on 7 December 2024, after defeating Rangers on penalties in the promotion play-offs finals. The promoted teams replaced Cobreloa and Deportes Copiapó, who were relegated to Primera B at the end of the 2024 season.

=== Stadia and locations ===
Team	City	Stadium	Capacity
Audax Italiano	Santiago (La Florida)	Bicentenario de La Florida	11,637
Cobresal	El Salvador	El Cobre	11,240
Colo-Colo	Santiago (Macul)	Monumental David Arellano	43,667
Coquimbo Unido	Coquimbo	Francisco Sánchez Rumoroso	15,809
Deportes Iquique	Iquique	Tierra de Campeones	13,171
Deportes La Serena	La Serena	La Portada	17,134
Deportes Limache	Limache	Nicolás Chahuán Nazar (Note: Deportes Limache played their home matches at Estadio Municipal Nicolás Chahuán Nazar in La Calera since their regular stadium Estadio Gustavo Ocaranza in Limache did not meet ANFP requirements.)	8,353
Everton	Viña del Mar	Sausalito	21,754
Huachipato	Talcahuano	Huachipato-CAP Acero	10,032
Ñublense	Chillán	Nelson Oyarzún Arenas	11,319
O'Higgins	Rancagua	El Teniente (Note: O'Higgins played most of their home matches in this season at Estadio Municipal Jorge Silva Valenzuela in San Fernando since Estadio El Teniente was refurbished to host the 2025 FIFA U-20 World Cup.)	12,476
Palestino	Santiago (La Cisterna)	Municipal de La Cisterna	8,000
Unión Española	Santiago (Independencia)	Santa Laura-Universidad SEK	19,887
Unión La Calera	La Calera	Nicolás Chahuán Nazar	8,353
Universidad Católica	Santiago (Las Condes)	Claro Arena (Note: Universidad Católica played their home matches until mid-August at Estadio Santa Laura-Universidad SEK in Santiago since Estadio San Carlos de Apoquindo was closed for remodeling works.)	20,249
Universidad de Chile	Santiago (Ñuñoa)	Nacional Julio Martínez Prádanos	46,190

=== Personnel and kits ===
Team	Manager	Kit manufacturer	Main shirt sponsors
Audax Italiano	(Argentina) Gustavo Lema	Macron	Traverso
Cobresal	(Chile) Gustavo Huerta	KS7	Pullman Bus
Colo-Colo	(Argentina) Fernando Ortiz	Adidas	JugaBet
Coquimbo Unido	(Chile) Esteban González	Capelli Sport	RojaBet
Deportes Iquique	(Chile) Rodrigo Guerrero (Chile) Manuel Villalobos (caretakers)	Rete	Collahuasi
Deportes La Serena	(Argentina) Mario Sciacqua	Fiume	Estelarbet
Deportes Limache	(Chile) Víctor Rivero	Claus-7	Pin-Up Casino, Transportes CVU
Everton	(Argentina) Javier Torrente	Charly	Terrawind
Huachipato	(Chile) Jaime García	Marathon	1XBET
Ñublense	(Chile) Ronald Fuentes	Capelli Sport	Stake
O'Higgins	(Argentina) Francisco Meneghini	Joma	BC.GAME
Palestino	(Argentina) Lucas Bovaglio	Capelli Sport	Bank of Palestine
Unión Española	(Chile) Gonzalo Villagra	Reebok	Universidad SEK
Unión La Calera	(Argentina) Martín Cicotello	Givova	Estelarbet, GWM, Suzuval
Universidad Católica	(Argentina) Daniel Garnero	Puma	BICE
Universidad de Chile	(Argentina) Gustavo Álvarez	Adidas	JugaBet

=== Managerial changes ===
Team	Outgoing manager	Manner of departure	Date of vacancy	Position in table	Incoming manager	Date of appointment
O'Higgins	(Chile) Víctor Fuentes	Return to the youth setup	10 November 2024	Pre-season	(Argentina) Francisco Meneghini	23 November 2024
Huachipato	(Spain) Igor Oca	End of contract	14 November 2024	Pre-season	(Chile) Jaime García	20 November 2024
Ñublense	(Chile) Mario Salas	End of contract	20 November 2024	Pre-season	(Chile) Francisco Arrué	11 December 2024
Everton	(Argentina) Esteban Solari	Sacked	26 November 2024	Pre-season	(Brazil) Gustavo Leal	13 December 2024
Ñublense	(Chile) Francisco Arrué	Mutual agreement	27 February 2025	13th	(Chile) Alejandro Gaete (Note: Caretaker manager.)	27 February 2025
Everton	(Brazil) Gustavo Leal	Sacked	10 March 2025	14th	(Argentina) Gustavo Dalsasso (Note: Julio Barroso was originally appointed as caretaker manager on 10 March, but since he did not fulfill the requirements to be registered as manager, Gustavo Dalsasso was appointed as caretaker and Barroso became an assistant to Dalsasso instead.)	13 March 2025
Everton	(Argentina) Gustavo Dalsasso	End of caretaker spell	19 March 2025	15th	(Uruguay) Mauricio Larriera	19 March 2025
Deportes Iquique	(Chile) Miguel Ramírez	Mutual agreement	2 April 2025	16th	(Chile) Rodrigo Guerrero	4 April 2025
Deportes Iquique	(Chile) Rodrigo Guerrero	End of caretaker spell	17 April 2025	16th	(Chile) Fernando Díaz	17 April 2025
Ñublense	(Chile) Alejandro Gaete	End of caretaker spell	27 April 2025	12th	(Chile) Ronald Fuentes	27 April 2025
Deportes La Serena	(Chile) Erwin Durán	Sacked	12 May 2025	12th	(Argentina) Cristian Paulucci	15 May 2025
Universidad Católica	(Brazil) Tiago Nunes	Mutual agreement	25 May 2025	8th	(Chile) Rodrigo Valenzuela	27 May 2025
Unión Española	(Chile) José Luis Sierra	Resigned	26 May 2025	15th	(Chile) Gonzalo Villagra	26 May 2025
Unión Española	(Chile) Gonzalo Villagra	End of caretaker spell	3 June 2025	15th	(Chile) Miguel Ramírez	3 June 2025
Universidad Católica	(Chile) Rodrigo Valenzuela	End of caretaker spell	14 June 2025	6th	(Argentina) Daniel Garnero	12 June 2025
Colo-Colo	(Argentina) Jorge Almirón	Sacked	19 August 2025	9th	(Chile) Luis Pérez (Chile) Hugo González (Note: Caretaker managers.)	19 August 2025
Deportes La Serena	(Argentina) Cristian Paulucci	Sacked	25 August 2025	13th	(Chile) Francisco Bozán	25 August 2025
Colo-Colo	(Chile) Luis Pérez (Chile) Hugo González	End of caretaker spell	31 August 2025	8th	(Argentina) Fernando Ortiz	30 August 2025
Unión La Calera	(Argentina) Walter Lemma	Mutual agreement	2 September 2025	11th	(Argentina) Martín Cicotello	3 September 2025
Deportes La Serena	(Chile) Francisco Bozán	End of caretaker spell	11 September 2025	13th	(Argentina) Mario Sciacqua	11 September 2025
Deportes Iquique	(Chile) Fernando Díaz	Mutual agreement	14 October 2025	16th	(Chile) Rodrigo Guerrero (Chile) Manuel Villalobos	14 October 2025
Everton	(Uruguay) Mauricio Larriera	Resigned	25 October 2025	13th	(Argentina) Javier Torrente	28 October 2025
Unión Española	(Chile) Miguel Ramírez	Resigned	8 November 2025	15th	(Chile) Gonzalo Villagra	8 November 2025
Audax Italiano	(Chile) Juan José Ribera	Sacked	13 November 2025	7th	(Argentina) Gustavo Lema	17 November 2025

== Standings ==
Pos	Team	Pld	W	D	L	GF	GA	GD	Pts	Qualification or relegation
1	Coquimbo Unido (C)	30	23	6	1	49	17	+32	75	Qualification for Copa Libertadores group stage
2	Universidad Católica	30	17	7	6	44	26	+18	58	Qualification for Copa Libertadores group stage
3	O'Higgins	30	16	8	6	43	34	+9	56	Qualification for Copa Libertadores second stage
4	Universidad de Chile	30	17	4	9	58	32	+26	55	Qualification for Copa Sudamericana first stage
5	Audax Italiano	30	16	4	10	51	43	+8	52	Qualification for Copa Sudamericana first stage
6	Palestino	30	14	7	9	42	31	+11	49	Qualification for Copa Sudamericana first stage
7	Cobresal	30	14	5	11	38	38	0	47	Qualification for Copa Sudamericana first stage
8	Colo-Colo	30	12	8	10	46	36	+10	44	
9	Huachipato	30	12	7	11	43	42	+1	43	Qualification for Copa Libertadores second stage (Note: Huachipato qualified for the Copa Libertadores second stage by winning the 2025 Copa Chile.)
10	Ñublense	30	8	9	13	31	40	−9	33	
11	Deportes Limache	30	8	7	15	36	43	−7	31	
12	Unión La Calera	30	8	5	17	28	39	−11	29	
13	Deportes La Serena	30	7	6	17	32	52	−20	27	
14	Everton	30	6	8	16	27	44	−17	26	
15	Deportes Iquique (R)	30	6	6	18	34	60	−26	24	Relegation to Primera B
16	Unión Española (R)	30	6	3	21	33	58	−25	21	Relegation to Primera B

Source: Campeonato Chileno, Soccerway
Rules for classification: 1) Points, 2) Playoff game (only if needed to decide championship between two teams), 3) Goal difference, 4) Matches won, 5) Goals for, 6) Away goals for, 7) Red cards, 8) Yellow cards, 9) Drawing of lots.
(C) Champions; (R) Relegated

== Results ==
Home \ Away	AUD	CSL	CC	COQ	IQQ	DLS	LIM	EVE	HUA	ÑUB	OHI	PAL	UE	ULC	UC	UCH
Audax Italiano	—	1–2	2–1	0–1	4–2	2–1	3–1	2–0	4–3	1–0	1–0	1–1	2–0	4–3	1–1	1–1
Cobresal	0–1	—	3–0	1–2	2–1	3–1	3–1	1–2	3–2	1–1	0–0	2–1	1–0	1–0	1–1	2–1
Colo-Colo	1–2	4–0	—	2–0	4–0	2–1	2–2	2–0	2–2	2–2	0–1	1–1	4–1	4–1	1–4	1–0
Coquimbo Unido	2–1	1–1	1–0	—	4–1	2–1	2–1	2–1	0–0	2–1	2–0	0–0	4–2	2–0	1–0	1–0
Deportes Iquique	1–0	2–1	2–2	0–3	—	1–2	2–1	1–2	3–0	0–2	2–3	1–3	0–4	0–1	2–2	2–3
Deportes La Serena	2–1	0–2	1–3	2–4	2–1	—	1–1	2–1	0–2	1–1	3–3	0–3	1–0	1–0	0–1	1–1
Deportes Limache	4–0	2–0	1–0	1–2	2–0	1–0	—	1–1	2–3	0–1	2–2	0–1	1–0	0–1	0–1	2–0
Everton	1–1	2–2	1–1	0–0	0–1	3–1	0–0	—	4–1	1–2	0–1	1–2	0–0	1–1	0–3	2–0
Huachipato	2–1	0–1	2–1	0–1	1–1	3–1	4–0	4–0	—	0–1	2–1	2–2	2–1	1–0	0–0	1–0
Ñublense	2–3	5–0	0–1	0–0	1–1	2–0	1–1	1–0	0–1	—	0–1	1–0	1–2	1–1	1–1	2–2
O'Higgins	3–2	1–0	1–1	0–1	2–2	1–1	3–1	1–0	0–0	4–2	—	1–0	1–0	1–0	2–0	0–1
Palestino	0–2	2–1	0–0	1–2	2–0	2–1	2–1	2–1	2–2	2–0	1–2	—	1–0	1–0	1–1	2–3
Unión Española	3–4	0–1	1–2	0–2	2–2	1–0	2–2	0–3	4–2	3–0	2–4	0–3	—	3–1	1–2	0–2
Unión La Calera	1–0	2–1	0–1	0–1	1–2	1–1	0–1	1–0	1–0	3–0	2–2	1–2	4–0	—	1–1	0–4
Universidad Católica	3–1	2–1	2–0	0–3	1–0	1–3	2–1	6–0	1–0	1–0	0–2	2–1	2–0	2–1	—	1–0
Universidad de Chile	1–3	0–1	2–1	1–1	3–1	3–1	4–3	2–0	5–1	5–0	6–0	2–1	4–1	1–0	1–0	—

Source: Campeonato Chileno, Soccerway
Legend: Blue = home team win; Yellow = draw; Red = away team win.

== Top scorers ==
Rank	Player	Club	Goals
1	(Chile) Fernando Zampedri	Universidad Católica	16
2	(Chile) Leonardo Valencia	Audax Italiano	15
3	(Chile) Daniel Castro	Deportes Limache	12
3	(Uruguay) Diego Coelho	Cobresal	12
3	(Argentina) Lucas Di Yorio	Universidad de Chile	12
3	(Argentina) Lionel Altamirano	Huachipato	12
7	(Chile) Jeisson Vargas	Deportes La Serena	11
7	(Argentina) Javier Correa	Colo-Colo	11
7	(Chile) Álvaro Ramos	Deportes Iquique	11
7	(Chile) Pablo Aránguiz	Unión Española	11
7	(Argentina) Sebastián Sáez	Unión La Calera	11

Source: Besoccer

== Attendances ==
Rank	Club	Average attendance
1	Universidad de Chile	29,632
2	Colo-Colo	24,332
3	Universidad Católica	10,787
4	Coquimbo Unido	7,786
5	Ñublense	4,821
6	Everton	4,803
7	Deportes Iquique	4,097
8	O'Higgins	3,520
9	Unión Española	3,115
10	Deportes La Serena	3,065
11	Audax Italiano	2,883
12	Huachipato	2,708
13	Deportes Limache	2,254
14	Unión La Calera	1,962
15	Palestino	1,832
16	Cobresal	611

== See also ==
- 2025 Primera B de Chile
- 2025 Copa Chile
- 2025 Supercopa de Chile
