= Estadio Independencia =

Estadio Independencia may refer to:

- Estadio Independencia (Chile), former stadium in Santiago, Chile
- Estadio Independencia (Nicaragua), stadium in Estelí, Nicaragua

== See also ==
- Arena Independência, stadium in Belo Horizonte, Brazil
- Estadio La Independencia, stadium in Tunja, Colombia
