= Manuel Rivera =

Manuel Rivera may refer to:

- Manuel Rivera (athlete) (1935–1994), Puerto Rican sprinter
- Manuel Rivera (footballer, born 1922) (1922–2005), Peruvian footballer
- Manuel Rivera (footballer, born 1978), Peruvian footballer
- Manuel Rivera (footballer, born 1996), Chilean footballer
- Manuel Rivera (painter) (1927–1995), Spanish painter
- Manuel Rivera-Ortiz (born 1968), Puerto Rican photographer
