= Felipe Campos =

Felipe Campos may refer to:

- Felipe Campos (Brazilian footballer) (born 1981), Brazilian football attacking midfielder
- Felipe Campos (Chilean footballer) (born 1993), Chilean football defender
