= Clásico Universitario =

Rivalry in Chilean football

- Location: Santiago
- Teams: Universidad de Chile; Universidad Católica
- First meeting: U. de Chile 2–1 U. Católica; 1937 Serie B (13 June 1937)
- Latest meeting: U. de Chile 1–0 U. Catolica; 2025 Campeonato Nacional (3 May 2025)

Statistics
- Most wins: Universidad de Chile (97)
- Most player appearances: Mario Lepe (35)
- Top scorer: Carlos Campos (14)
- Largest victory: U. Católica 5–0 U. de Chile; 1954 Campeonato Nacional (22 August 1954)

The Clásico Universitario is one of the most important rivalries of Chilean football and refers to any match contested between Universidad Católica and Universidad de Chile. This clásico (derby) has been recognized by FIFA as the most traditional of Chile. It is the oldest confrontation between two clubs from academic roots, as the first confrontation goes back to the University Classic of 1909.

These two teams have played twenty championship definitions against each other (finals, semi-finals, qualifying in general), Universidad Católica has won thirteen and Universidad de Chile six.

== Stadiums ==
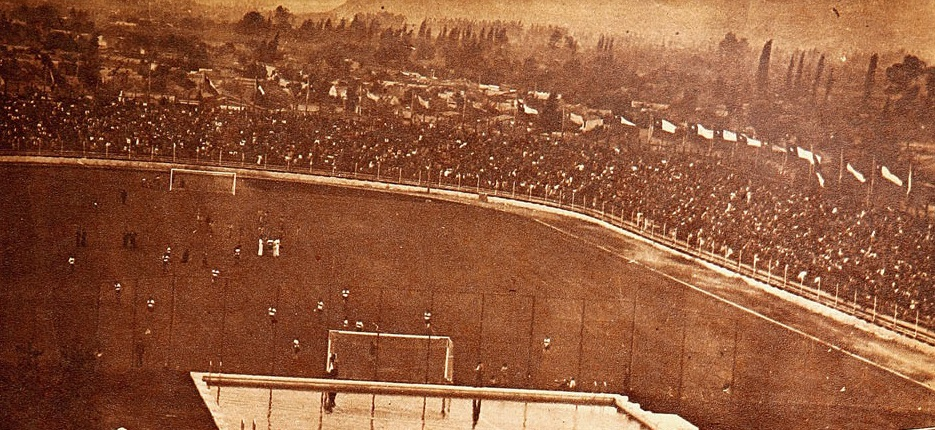
Independencia, the third stadium of Universidad Católica.

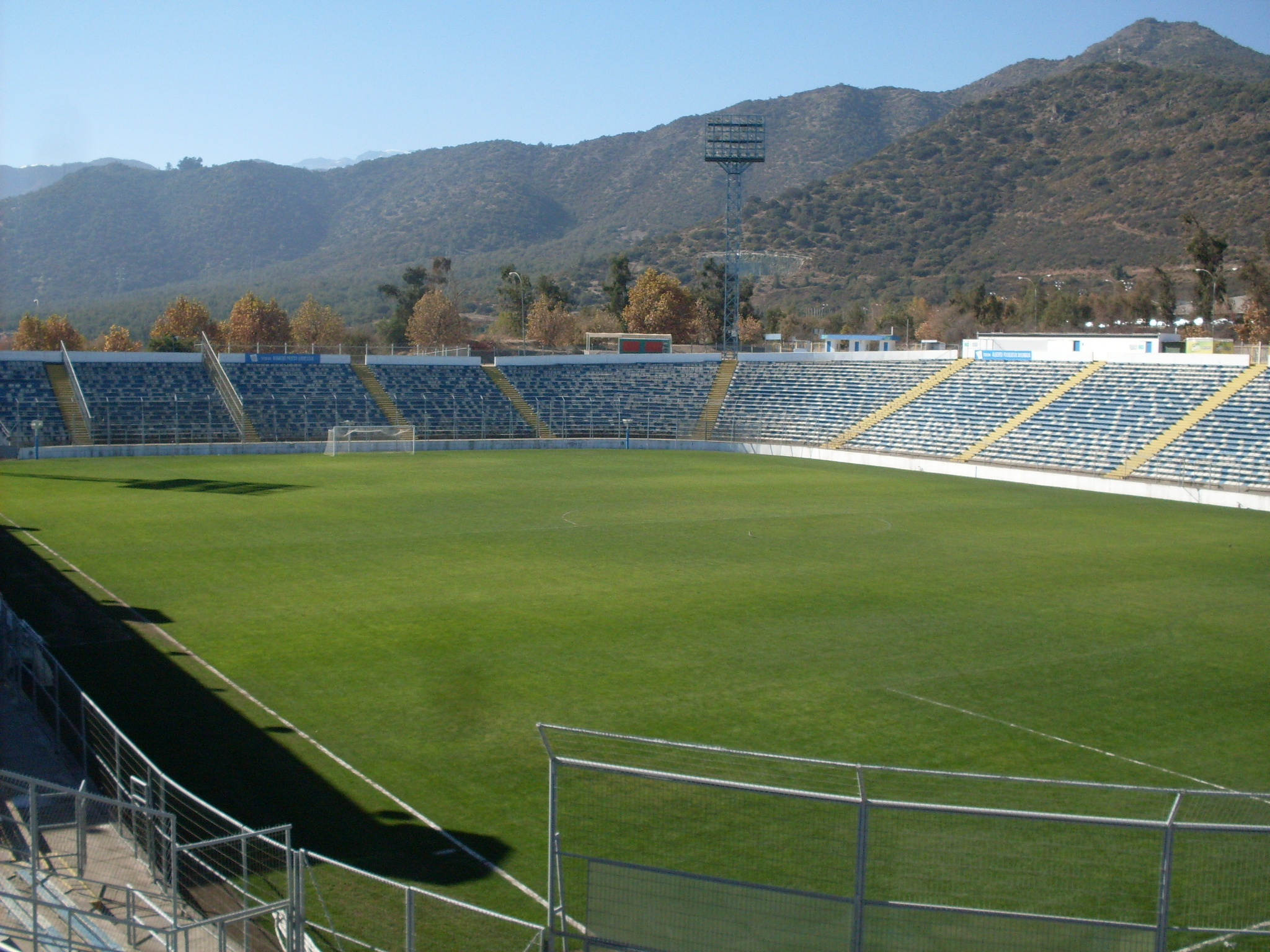
San Carlos de Apoquindo, current stadium of Universidad Católica.

Universidad Católica has owned four stadiums: Estadio Universidad Católica, located in the Maestranza and Marcoleta sector; Campos de Sports de Ñuñoa, which already had an extensive history in Chilean sports; Independencia, located in the homonymous commune of Santiago and inaugurated on October 12, 1945; and San Carlos de Apoquindo, which opened its doors on September 4, 1988, being the scene of an Copa Interamericana final, among other events such as Copa Libertadores, Copa Sudamericana and Copa Mercosur matches. The stadium also hosted the Chile national football team in five matches of the Qatar 2022 qualifiers.

To date, Universidad de Chile does not have its own stadium. Played at home in venues such as Estadio Nacional and Santa Laura.

== Statistics ==
As of 10 March 2024

	Matches	Wins		Draws
	Matches	UCHI	UCAT	Draws
Campeonato Nacional	196	75	63	60
Copa Chile	30	15	9	6
Supercopa de Chile	1	0	1	0
Campeonato de Apertura (1933-50)	3	2	1	0
Serie B (1935-41)	1	1	0	0
Liguilla Pre-Libertadores	7	1	3	3
CONMEBOL Libertadores	11	2	4	5
CONMEBOL Sudamericana	2	1	1	0
All competitions	247	97	76	74
