= Héctor Pedutto =

Argentine footballer

Personal information
- Full name: Héctor Walter Pedutto
- Date of birth: 18 July 1935
- Place of birth: Buenos Aires, Argentina
- Position: Forward

Youth career
- River Plate

Senior career*
Years	Team	Apps	(Gls)
1954	Platense		
1957	Vélez Sarsfield	5	(0)
1958–1959	Argentinos Juniors		
1960–1962	Los Andes	47	(13)
1962	Santiago Wanderers	8	(4)
1963	Gimnasia La Plata		
1964–1966	Lister Rossel		
1967–1968	Ñublense		

International career
1953	Argentina U18		
1959	Argentina		

Managerial career
- 1970: Ñublense
- * Club domestic league appearances and goals

Héctor Walter Pedutto (born 18 July 1935) was an Argentine football forward and manager.

== Playing career ==
Born in Buenos Aires, Argentina, Pedutto was trained at River Plate. In Argentine Primera División, he played for Platense, Vélez Sarsfield, Argentinos Juniors, Los Andes and Gimnasia La Plata.

With Los Andes, he also won the 1960 Primera B.

Abroad, Pedutto had a stint with Santiago Wanderers in the 1962 Chilean Primera División. He returned to Chile and ended his career with Lister Rossel and Ñublense between 1964 and 1968 in the second division.

== International career ==
Pedutto represented Argentina at under-18 level in the 1953 FIFA Youth Tournament. Later, he represented the senior team in a friendlies against Internacional and Grêmio in 1959 and 1960, respectively.
