= Hernán Muñoz =

Chilean footballer (born 1988)

Personal information
- Full name: Hernán Guillermo Muñoz Espinoza
- Date of birth: 9 August 1988 (age 38)
- Place of birth: Talca, Chile
- Height: 1.82 m (5 ft 11 1/2 in)
- Position: Goalkeeper

Team information
- Current team: Ñublense

Senior career*
Years	Team	Apps	(Gls)
2011–2012	Municipal Mejillones	–	(–)
2012–2014	San Marcos	8	(0)
2013	→ Deportes Linares (loan)	10	(0)
2014–2018	Santiago Morning	70	(0)
2019–2021	Deportes Copiapó	51	(0)
2021–2023	Ñublense	11	(0)
2024	Santiago Morning	31	(0)
2025	Curicó Unido	22	(0)
2026–	Ñublense	0	(0)
- * Club domestic league appearances and goals as of 22 December 2025

Hernán Guillermo Muñoz Espinoza (born 9 August 1988) is a Chilean footballer who plays as a goalkeeper for Ñublense.

== Career ==
From 2021 to 2023, he played for Ñublense.

On 16 January 2024, Muñoz was announced as new player of Provincial Ovalle in the Segunda División Profesional de Chile, however he switched to Santiago Morning the next month.

Muñoz returned to Ñublense for the 2026 season.

== Career statistics ==
League Information
Year	Club Joined	Division	Minutes played
2011	Municipal Mejillones	— data not available —	
2012	San Marcos de Arica; July 1, 2012	Primera B	0
2013	Deportes Linares	Segunda División	1047
2013	San Marcos de Arica	Primera B	683
2014	San Marcos de Arica	Primera B	683
2014	Santiago Morning	Primera B	1080
2015	Santiago Morning	Primera B	1080
2015	Santiago Morning	Primera B	816
2016	Santiago Morning	Primera B	816
2016	Santiago Morning	Primera B	2430
2017	Santiago Morning	Primera B	2430
2017	Santiago Morning	Primera B	1201
2018	Santiago Morning	Primera B	466
2019	Deportes Copiapó	Primera B	1260
