= Ricardo Toro =

Chilean footballer (born 1961)

Personal information
- Full name: Ricardo Roberto Toro Vergara
- Date of birth: 20 December 1961 (age 64)
- Place of birth: Santiago, Chile
- Position: Centre-back

Youth career
- Palestino

Senior career*
Years	Team	Apps	(Gls)
1979–1989	Palestino		
1983	→ Unión San Felipe (loan)		
1989	Everton		
1990	Palestino		
1991	Deportes Temuco		
1992	Provincial Osorno		
1993	Audax Italiano		
1994–1995	FAS		
1996	Unión San Felipe		

International career
1987	Chile	5	(0)

Managerial career
- 1997–2007: Palestino (youth)
- 2004: Palestino (interim)
- 2008–2013: Ñublense (youth)
- 2009: Ñublense (interim)
- 2010: Ñublense (interim)
- * Club domestic league appearances and goals

Ricardo Roberto Toro Vergara (born 20 December 1961) is a Chilean former footballer who played as a centre-back.

== Playing career ==
He played in five matches for the Chile national football team in 1987. He was also part of Chile's squad for the 1987 Copa América tournament.

== Coaching career ==
He worked in the Palestino youth ranks since 1997 until 2007, assuming as interim coach of the first team in 2004.

Then, he worked in the Ñublense youth ranks, performing as interim coach in 2009 and 2010.
