= Diego Sanhueza =

Chilean footballer

Personal information
- Full name: Diego Mauricio Sanhueza Hemmelmann
- Date of birth: 30 June 2002 (age 24)
- Place of birth: Concepción, Chile
- Height: 1.74 m (5 ft 9 in)
- Position: Right-back

Team information
- Current team: Ñublense
- Number: 16

Youth career
- Fernández Vial

Senior career*
Years	Team	Apps	(Gls)
2020–2024	Fernández Vial	53	(0)
2023	→ San Luis (loan)	8	(0)
2023	→ Unión La Calera (loan)	2	(0)
2024	→ Deportes La Serena (loan)	29	(1)
2025–	Ñublense	14	(0)
- * Club domestic league appearances and goals as of 23 September 2025

Diego Mauricio Sanhueza Hemmelmann (born 30 June 2002) is a Chilean footballer who plays as a right-back for Ñublense in the Chilean Primera División.

== Club career ==
Born in Concepción, Chile, Sanhueza was trained at Fernández Vial and made his senior debut in the 2020 Segunda División Profesional de Chile, winning the league title and the promotion to the Primera B de Chile. He continued with them the next two seasons.

From 2023 to 2024, Sanhueza was loaned out to San Luis de Quillota (2023), Unión La Calera (2023) and Deportes La Serena (2024). With Deportes La Serena, he won the 2024 Primera B de Chile, got promotion to the Chilean Primera División and was selected as the best right-back of the tournament.

In January 2025, Sanhueza signed with Ñublense in the Chilean top division and took part in the 2025 Copa Libertadores.
