= Jovany Campusano =

Chilean footballer (born 1993)

Personal information
- Full name: Jovany Alberto Campusano Villega
- Date of birth: 11 January 1993 (age 33)
- Place of birth: La Serena, Chile
- Height: 1.70 m (5 ft 7 in)
- Positions: Left-back; midfielder

Youth career
- 2007–2010: Deportes La Serena

Senior career*
Years	Team	Apps	(Gls)
2011–2019	Deportes La Serena	126	(2)
2020–2023	Ñublense	105	(1)
- * Club domestic league appearances and goals as of 28 December 2020

Jovany Alberto Campusano Villega (born 11 January 1993) is a Chilean footballer who plays as a left-back or defensive midfielder.

== Career ==
Campusano started his football career at the local professional of his city Deportes La Serena, joining to the youth ranks in 2007, aged 14. He finally, three years later, was promoted to the first adult team for the 2011 season and his professional debut came on 17 April of the same year in a 3–1 home victory over Santiago Wanderers at La Portada Stadium, playing just 11 minutes of that match for then play for first time in his career, the full 90 minutes, in a match against Universidad Católica.

In 2020, he switched to Ñublense, playing for them until December 2023.
