= Pablo Abraham =

Argentine football manager

Personal information
- Full name: Pablo Damián Abraham Capelli
- Date of birth: 30 March 1979 (age 47)
- Place of birth: Santa Fe, Argentina
- Height: 1.75 m (5 ft 9 in)

Managerial career
- Years: Team
- 2010–2012: Universidad de Chile (assistant)
- 2012: Fernández Vial
- 2012–2013: Curicó Unido
- 2014: Ñublense
- 2014–2015: Deportes Temuco
- 2015–2016: Magallanes
- 2016–2017: Ñublense
- 2018: Sport Rosario
- 2023: Chile U20 (women)

Pablo Damián Abraham Capelli (born 30 March 1979) is an Argentine football manager.

== Managerial career ==
In 2012, he was hired by Chilean third-tier side Fernández Vial after working as Jorge Sampaoli’s assistant coach at Universidad de Chile the previous season, where he helped Sampaoli win the first treble in the club's history (Apertura and Clausura titles and the 2011 Copa Sudamericana).

In January 2014 he was hired by Primera División de Chile club Ñublense to face the rest of the 2013–14 season. However, at the end of it, he was sacked due to poor results.

After brief spells at Deportes Temuco and Magallanes during the 2014–15 and the 2015–16 seasons, he returned to Ñublense in mid-2016.

On 20 December 2017, Abraham signed for Sport Rosario. Abraham quit on 3 March 2018. Since then Pablo resides in England with his wife and child.

On 16 May 2023, Abraham was announced as coach for the Chile women's national under-20 team as well as an assistant for the other categories. In August of the same year, he left the team.
