= Estadio Universidad Católica =

Stadium in Chile

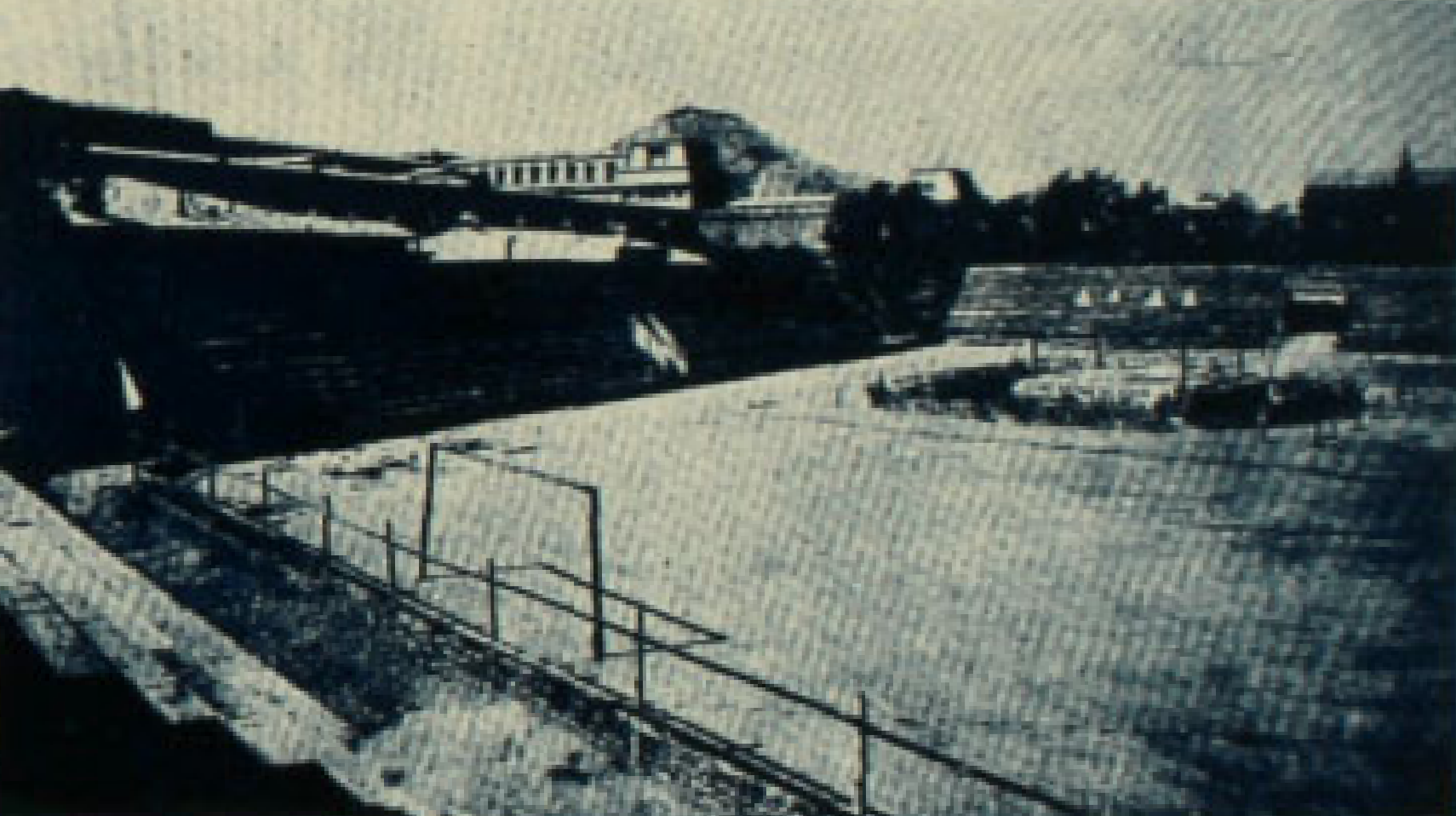
- Interactive map of Estadio Universidad Católica
- Full name: Estadio Universidad Católica
- Former names: Estadio Baquedano (1928-1929); Estadio Reina Victoria (1929-1932)
- Location: Santiago, Chile
- Owner: Universidad Católica

Construction
- Opened: 1 December 1928
- Closed: 1937

Tenants
- Major sporting events hosted; 1927 Universidad Católica Day Tennis Tournament; 1928, 1930 National Boxing Championship; 1929 Latin American Amateur Boxing Championship; 1930 Inter-Center Boxing Competition; 1930 La Nación Equestrian Trophy; 1930 Champion Equestrian Award; 1931 Military Boxing Championship

Estadio Universidad Católica was a multi-use stadium in Santiago, Chile. The venue was also known as Estadio Baquedano and Estadio Reina Victoria, due to the boxing events held there and the good relations between the entrepreneur in charge of the events and a cigar company. Among the events held at this venue were football matches, boxing nights (including a Latin American championship), equestrian events, and others.

The Estadio Universidad Católica was the first of four stadiums that have been owned by the Chilean club Universidad Católica, followed by the Campos de Sports de Ñuñoa, Estadio Independencia, and the Estadio San Carlos de Apoquindo (currently known as Claro Arena for commercial reasons). This sports venue was located at the corner of Maestranza Street (currently named Avenida Portugal) and Marcoleta.

== History ==
In 1927, a tennis tournament was held on the grounds that would later be used to build the stadium. The participants were engineering students from the Pontificia Universidad Católica de Chile. From 1928 to the early 1930s, the sports venue was shared with Ratinoff y Cía. through a concession agreement, in exchange for infrastructure improvements. On December 1 of that year, the sports field was inaugurated as Estadio Baquedano, due to its proximity to Plaza Baquedano in Santiago, Chile. The inauguration featured a day of the National Boxing Championship, contested among various cities, with over 4,000 spectators in attendance. In October 1929, the stadium's name changed to Estadio Reina Victoria, resulting from the good relations between entrepreneur Alfredo Ratinoff and a tobacco company, whose main product was named Reina Victoria. Funds generated by the stadium's activities enabled Pontificia Universidad Católica to undertake repair work on the university's central campus. At that time, the university represented the football club in negotiations, during the transition from amateur to professional era of Universidad Católica in Chilean football. The venue came to be remembered by its official name, Estadio Universidad Católica.
