= Jaime García (footballer) =

Chilean footballer and manager (born 1977)

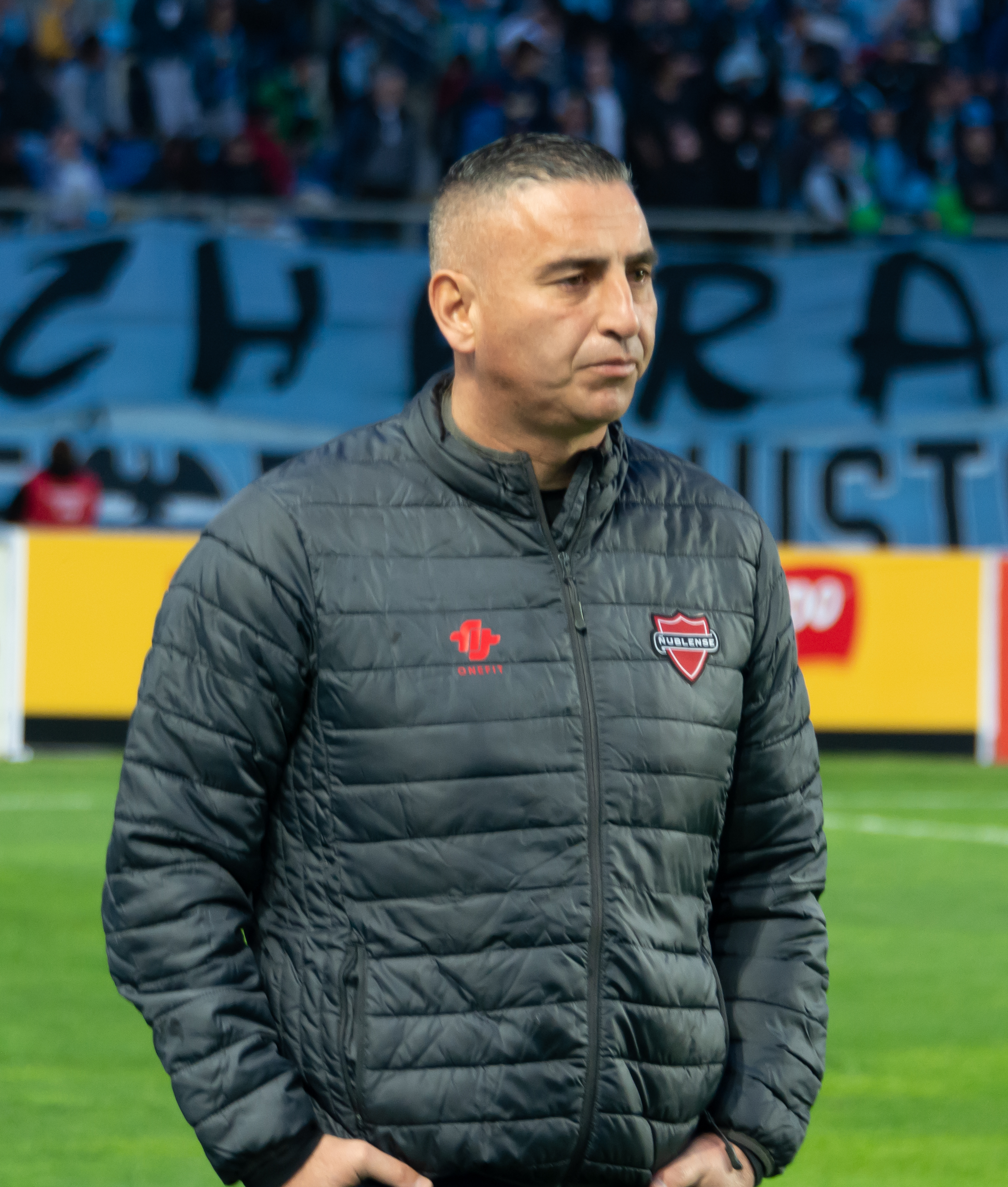
- García in 2023

Personal information
- Full name: Jaime García Arévalo
- Date of birth: 30 August 1977 (age 49)
- Place of birth: Cartagena, Chile
- Position: Centre back

Team information
- Current team: Huachipato (manager)

Senior career*
Years	Team	Apps	(Gls)
- Atlético Cartagena
- San Antonio Unido
- Deportes Melipilla
- San Marcos

Managerial career
- 2012–2013: Coquimbo Unido (assistant)
- 2014–2015: San Antonio Unido (assistant)
- 2015–2016: Deportes La Serena (assistant)
- 2016–2017: Deportes La Serena
- 2018: Santiago Morning
- 2019–2023: Ñublense
- 2024: Santiago Wanderers
- 2025–: Huachipato
- * Club domestic league appearances and goals

Jaime García Arévalo (born 30 August 1977) is a Chilean football manager and former player who played as a central defender. He is the current manager of Huachipato.

== Career ==
Born in Cartagena, García started his career with local side Atlético Cartagena. He subsequently played for San Antonio Unido, Deportes Melipilla and San Marcos de Arica before retiring.

After retiring, García subsequently became Luis Musrri's assistant at Coquimbo Unido, San Antonio Unido and Deportes La Serena. In September 2016, after Musrri left to Universidad de Chile, García was named manager of La Serena.

On 27 November 2017, García was sacked by La Serena. He was named at the helm of Santiago Morning on 19 December, but was dismissed the following 30 October.

On 2 April 2019, García replaced Germán Cavalieri at the helm of Ñublense. He achieved promotion to the Primera División in 2020 as champions, and renewed his contract on 1 February 2021.

== Honours ==
Ñublense

- Primera B de Chile: 2020

Huachipato

- Copa Chile: 2025
