= Gustavo Dalsasso =

Argentine-Chilean footballer (born 1976)

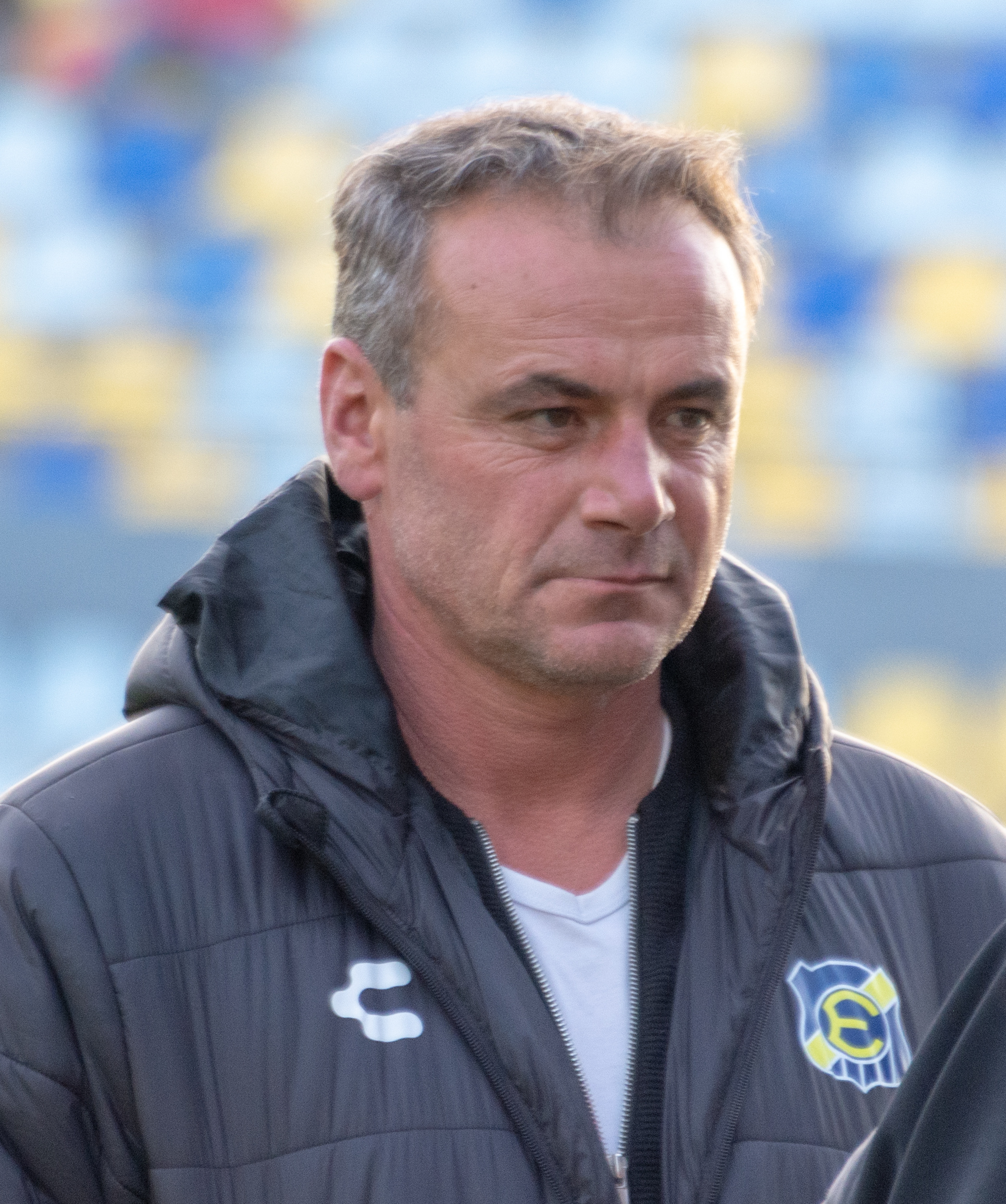
- Dalsasso as sport manager of Everton in 2023

Personal information
- Full name: Gustavo Tulio Dalsasso Coletti
- Date of birth: 25 September 1976 (age 50)
- Place of birth: Villa Regina, Argentina
- Height: 1.88 m (6 ft 2 in)
- Position: Goalkeeper

Team information
- Current team: Everton Viña del Mar (sporting director)

Youth career
- Boca Juniors

Senior career*
| Years | Team | Apps | (Gls) |
| 1994–1999 | Boca Juniors | 0 | (0) |
| 1995 | → Deportes Antofagasta (loan) | 0 | (0) |
| 1995–1996 | → Deportivo Español (loan) | 4 | (0) |
| 1996–1998 | → Defensores de Belgrano (loan) | 17 | (0) |
| 1999–2004 | Huachipato | 100 | (0) |
| 2005–2006 | Rangers | 57 | (0) |
| 2007–2016 | Everton Viña del Mar | 245 | (0) |
| Total | | 402 | (0) |

Managerial career
- 2025: Everton Viña del Mar (interim)
- * Club domestic league appearances and goals

Gustavo Tulio Dalsasso (born 25 September 1976) is an Argentine football coach and former player who played as a goalkeeper. He is the current sporting director of Everton Viña del Mar.

Dalsasso also holds Chilean nationality.

== Club career ==
Born in Villa Regina, Argentina, Dalsasso started his football career at Boca Juniors in 1992 and was promoted to the first-team in 1995. Then he immediately was sent on loan to Deportes Antofagasta. However, once finished the 95's Chilean football season, Boca newly sent on loan him, now to Defensores de Belgrano where remained two seasons. Shortly after, Dalsasso signed for Argentinian top-level's Deportivo Español, being the second goalkeeper and wearing the number 2 shirt.

In January 1999, he returned to Chilean football and joined Huachipato. Dalsasso remained there six seasons until 2004 when the coach Arturo Salah told him that he wouldn't consider him anymore because he sought to occupy the foreigner quota in another position. Then, following a failed transference to Italy's Venezia, Dalsasso remained at Chile and moved to Rangers de Talca of first-level too.

Dalsasso made his Rangers de Talca debut against Unión Española in a 0−0 draw at Estadio Fiscal de Talca. He was an undisputed titular in the club, playing all games of the tournament. On 2 April 2006, he received for first time in his career seven goals, in a match against Colo-Colo that his team lost 7−2. However, the team was relegated to Primera B after losing against Lota Schwager in the promotion playoffs during the shootout.

=== Everton ===
Dalsasso signed for Everton for an undisclosed fee in 2006. He was on the substitutes' bench, when Everton was the 2008 Apertura champions. After club's first goalkeeper departure (Johnny Herrera) and after successfully challenging the goal to Paulo Garcés, he became the team's titular keeper.

During Dalsasso's titularity in the club, he made very solid performances in the porter's lodge. After failing to play in six matches due to an injury, in his debut for the Torneo Clausura, he saved a penalty to Braulio Leal in the 2–1 defeat against Audax Italiano. On September 28, 2008, he once saved a penalty, now to Lucas Barrios, helping to Everton to win 3–1 to Colo-Colo. However, the club didn't replay its league title, being eliminated in the repechaje. Dalsasso was nominated among the three best goalkeepers of the Chilean football season in the ANFP Golden Boal, but the prize was for Nery Veloso.

In his Copa Libertadores debut on February 17, 2009, Dalsasso made a notable performance in the team's 1–0 win to Caracas Fútbol Club, saving to Everton of draw on many occasions. He again was a key player in the 2–1 win over Lanús in Argentina, where he made some very good saves and also saved a penalty from José Sand. Nevertheless, unfortunately the club failed to advance to the second stage.

He played the most part of the 2009 Torneo Clausura matches. On November 21, 2009, Dalsasso received a red card during the playoffs match at quarterfinals first leg against Universidad Católica, so that he missed the second leg match where Everton was eliminated in a 2–0 global.

For the next season, he was promoted to team's captain. On October 4, 2010, he played during the historic friendly match against Everton F.C., that his club lost 2–0. Nevertheless, after a poor campaign Everton was relegated to Primera B. After Everton's relegation, he received an offer from Colo-Colo on December 10, 2010, but he declined this offer remaining in the club and even requesting to be untransferable.

In 2012, Everton de Vina del Mar returned to first division after beating Universidad de Concepcion in the promotion playoffs, having one more time to Dalsasso as a key player. Following two seasons at top-level, in 2014, the team again was relegated to Primera B (second division), but time later in the 2015–16 season being an important player as usual, he notably helped the team to achieve the promotion to first level, being thereby his last season as professional, announcing his retirement from professional football on June 7, 2016.

== International career ==
Dalsasso has not played in any international matches, but because his naturalization he had the opportunity to play for the Chile national team in a match against Panama. However, the coach Marcelo Bielsa didn't call up him and Everton's president said that: "Is a shame that Bielsa don't call to Gustavo for play in the national team".

== Honours ==
=== Club ===
Everton

- Primera División de Chile (1): 2008 Apertura
- Primera B de Chile (1): 2011 Clausura
