= Daniel Vicencio =

Chilean footballer

Personal information
- Full name: Daniel Moisés Vicencio Quiero
- Date of birth: 4 August 1992 (age 34)
- Place of birth: Zapallar, Chile
- Height: 1.80 m (5 ft 11 in)
- Position: Centre-back

Youth career
- 2007–2011: San Luis

Senior career*
Years	Team	Apps	(Gls)
2011–2018	San Luis	183	(11)
2019	Coquimbo Unido	1	(0)
2019	Cobreloa	9	(0)
2020–2021	San Luis	16	(0)
2020–2021	→ Palestino (loan)	2	(0)
2021	Cobreloa	18	(1)
2022–2024	San Marcos	44	(5)
2025	Provincial Osorno	6	(0)
- * Club domestic league appearances and goals as of 31 December 2025

Daniel Moisés Vicencio Quiero (born 4 August 1992) is a Chilean footballer who plays as a centre-back.

== Club career ==
Born in Zapallar, Chile, Vicencio is a product of San Luis de Quillota. He made his professional debut in the 2011 season. Later, he won the 2014–15 Primera B de Chile and spent three and a half years in the Chilean Primera División with them, becoming the team captain. A historical player for them, he has reached more than 200 official matches.

In 2019, Vicencio joined Coquimbo Unido in the Chilean top division and switched to Cobreloa in the second half of the year. The next year, he returned to San Luis de Quillota and was loaned out to Palestino on 1 December 2020.

In 2021, Vicencio returned to Cobreloa. A free agent the next year, he signed with San Marcos de Arica on 4 July 2022, winning the 2022 Segunda División Profesional. He was with them until the 2024 season.

In February 2025, Vicencio signed with Provincial Osorno.
