= Marcos Velásquez =

Chilean footballer (born 1987)

Personal information
- Full name: Marcos Ignacio Velásquez Ahumada
- Date of birth: 23 September 1987 (age 39)
- Place of birth: Casablanca, Chile
- Height: 1.80 m (5 ft 11 in)
- Position: Defender

Team information
- Current team: Concón National
- Number: 3

Youth career
- Everton

Senior career*
Years	Team	Apps	(Gls)
2007–2020	Everton	246	(4)
2010	→ Unión San Felipe (loan)	4	(0)
2021	Rangers	17	(1)
2022	Vida	8	(1)
2022–2025	Santiago Wanderers	58	(2)
2026–	Concón National	2	(0)
- * Club domestic league appearances and goals as of 5 April 2026

Marcos Ignacio Velásquez Ahumada (born June 23, 1987) is a Chilean football defender for Concón National.

== Career ==
Marcos Velásquez started his career in 2007 in Everton. His first goal was against Coquimbo Unido in a victory over 3–1 in the second half of 2007.

In 2008, Velásquez was crowned champion of the Torneo Apertura 2008 in a 3–0 victory over Colo Colo. After, in 2009 he has not had much participation has played only 5 games all year and 3 of them got to change.

In 2010, he was loaned to Unión San Felipe.

In 2022, he moved to Honduras and joined Vida in the Liga Nacional de Fútbol Profesional. After suffering a violent mugging in his apartment in Honduras, he ended his contract with Vida and returned to Chile to join Santiago Wanderers, the traditional rival of Everton.

In February 2026, Velásquez joined Concón National in the Segunda División Profesional de Chile.

== Personal life ==
He is nicknamed Chano for his resemblance to the former footballer Lizardo Chano Garrido.

== Honours ==
=== Club ===
Everton

- Primera División de Chile (1): 2008 Apertura
- Primera B de Chile (1): 2011 Clausura
