= Ñublense =

Chilean football club

- Full name: Club Deportivo Ñublense S.A.D.P.
- Nicknames: Diablos Rojos (Red Devils); Ñuble
- Founded: August 20, 1916; 110 years ago
- Ground: Estadio Municipal Nelson Oyarzún Arenas; Chillán
- Capacity: 12,000
- Chairman: Sergio Gioino
- Manager: Juan José Ribera
- League: Liga de Primera
- 2025: Liga de Primera, 10th of 16
- Website: http://www.losdiablosrojos.cl/
Home colours	Away colours	Third colours

Club Deportivo Ñublense (Spanish pronunciation: [ɲuˈβlense]) is a professional football team based in Chillán, Ñuble Region, Chile. The club was formed in 1916 under the name of Liceo Fútbol Club. They compete in Chile's Primera División.

== History ==
=== Amateur era ===
Ñublense was formed in 1916 by a group of teenagers (led by Chillán teacher Manuel Lara Gutiérrez) who founded a sports club as a haven for sports activities in the city. On 20 August of that year, in the boys' high school the club was called the Liceo Fútbol Club. Other sports sponsored included basketball and boxing. The football team played for many years in local leagues, where they were champions for 11 consecutive years (1938–49). Noted players included Eduardo Sanhueza Martín, Candelario Sepúlveda, Tomás Figueroa Bravo, Carlos González Utreras and Humberto Fagnilli Fuentes (who renamed the club Liceo Ñublense).

In 1942, with Lautaro Vásquez Landa as coach, the team was renamed Club de Deportes Ñublense. It continued in local leagues until 1957, when team president Moisés Noriega Alarcón moved the team to a regional league where it played teams such as Lord Cochrane de Concepción, Universitario, Gente de Mar, Galvarino and Arturo Fernández Vial.

=== Professional era ===
In 1959, under coach Mario Avedaño, Ñublense entered the Chilean professional league. Under Argentine coach Martín Garcia many young players joined the club, including Universidad de Chile goalkeeper Luis Venzano Justiniano (the first professional football player on the team).

In 1961 (under coach Renato Sánchez Solar) Ñublense signed José Borello, who played for Boca Juniors and the Argentine national team. The team finished fourth with such players as Carlos Abel Jarpa Vallejos, Vicente Cox Vial and Luis Fischer, who added stability to the club. For the first two years Ñublense, played in the only paved football field in Chillán (the stadium of Seminario School) whilst the grass was sown and the stands and dressing rooms built.

In 1976 the team had one its best seasons (with Pedro Guzmán Alvarez as president and Isaac Carrasco as coach), winning the Primera B (Second Division) and promotion to the Primera División Chilena for 1977. Its second year in the Primera División, Ñublense had its most important coach in team history (Nelson Oyarzún Arenas, nicknamed "Consommé" because he required his players to drink consommé after games), who won the fans' respect. On 10 September 1978, Nelson Oyarzún died of cancer; that afternoon, Ñublense won 2–1 over Colo-Colo in a memorable game. Shortly afterwards, the Estadio Municipal de Chillán was renamed Estadio Municipal de Chillán Nelson Oyarzún in the coach's honor.

=== Decline ===
In 1979, with Hernan Godoy as the coach, Ñublense was relegated to Primera B. However, a year later the club was again promoted to Primera División. The joy was short-lived, though; the team was again relegated to segunda and then to Tercera División for three years. Amidst financial problems, the team was renamed Ñuble Unido.

In 1985, under Esaú Bravo, the undefeated team won the Tercera División title and promotion to Primera B. Héctor Canahuete restructured the team's debt and recovered the name Ñublense. In 1991, during a lockout, the team was again relegated to Tercera División.

In 1992, Esaú Bravo returned to the Ñublense bench for its promotion to Primera B after defeating San Luis de Quillota 4–2 in the Primera B promotion play-offs. Ñublense performed well in Copa Chile 1995, eliminating Colo-Colo in the quarter-finals but losing to Universidad Católica in the semi-finals.

In 2000, the team was relegated to Tercera; in 2001 it was nearly relegated to the Cuarta División Chilena. With 30 seconds remaining in a game against General Velásquez, Edgardo Medina scored to keep the team in Tercera División.

=== Since 2000 ===
Club Deportivo Ñublense's home at Bulnes 377, Chillán

Former sportscaster Sergio Zarzar acquired the club in 2004; that year, it was promoted to the Primera B after winning the Tercera División title under coach Luis Marcoleta.

Ñublense was runner-up in the Primera B in 2006 and returned to the Primera División Chilena in 2007, finishing ninth. In summer 2008, Fernando Díaz became coach after Marcoleta's departure for Curicó Unido.

Under Díaz in the Torneo de Apertura, Ñublense had their most successful season. The team finished first in the regular season with 41 points, five points clear of Universidad Católica and O'Higgins. Ñublense was eliminated in the play-off semi-finals by Colo-Colo, but its first-place finish in the first round qualified the team for the Copa Sudamericana 2008 for the first time. In this tournament, however, Ñublense was quickly eliminated by Peruvian club Sport Áncash by an aggregate score of 4–1.

Since 2008, the team has fared less well. In the Primera División Chilena 2009 season Ñublense finished 13th in the annual table with 39 points (nearly making the promotion play-offs), and achieved an identical result in 2010.

== Stadium ==
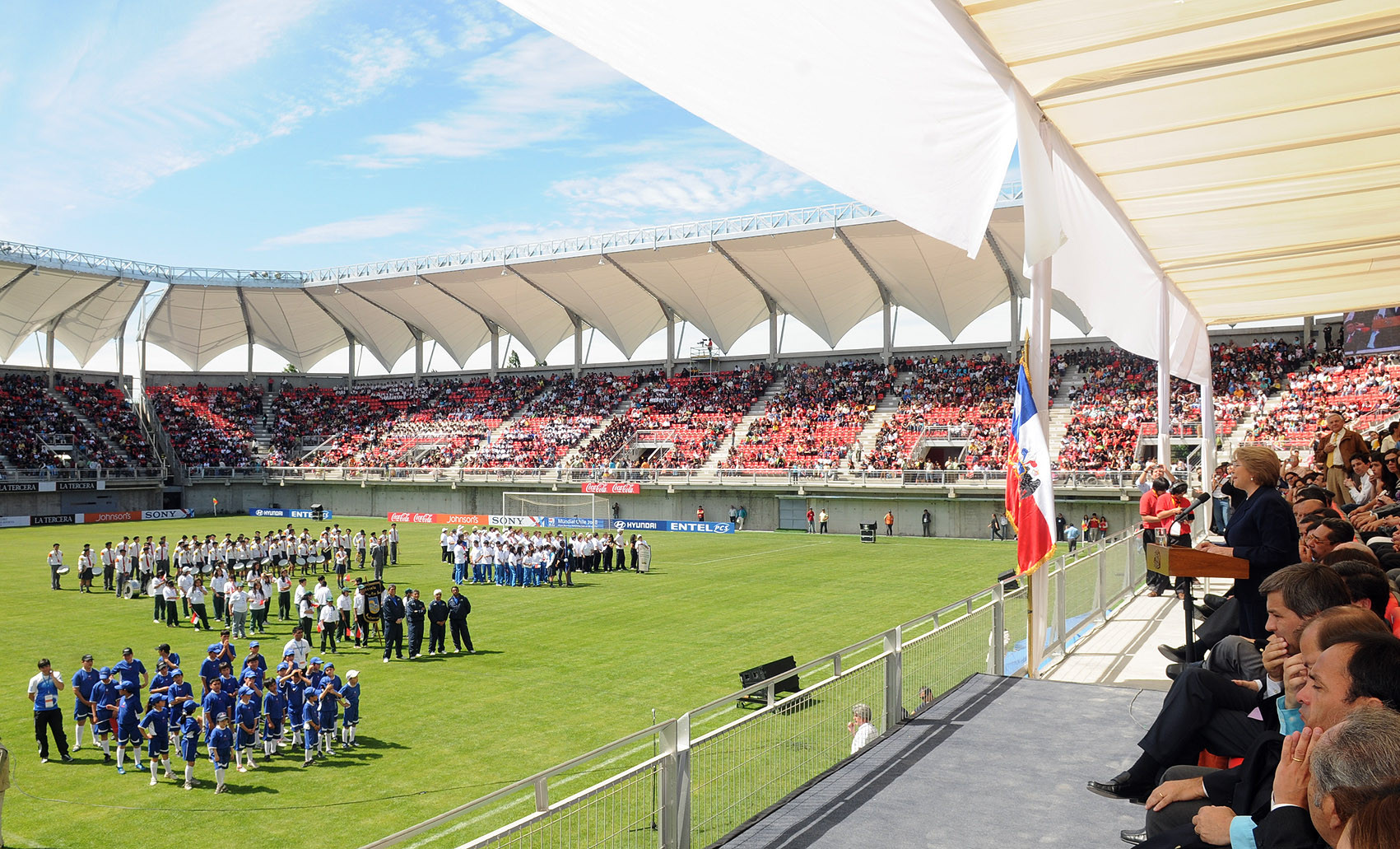
Dedication of the stadium in 2008

Estadio Municipal de Chillán Nelson Oyarzún Arenas, home to the Ñublense club, is named after Nelson Oyarzún Arenas, a Ñublense coach. It was opened in 1961 and has a capacity of 12,000. In 2007, the stadium was selected as a venue for the 2008 FIFA U-20 Women's World Cup. To comply with FIFA standards it was demolished and rebuilt (with the direction the pitch is facing altered), its capacity was decreased from 17,500 to 12,000 and a roof covering all seats was built. The renovation of the stadium cost 12 billion pesos ($26 million). The stadium was re-dedicated on 2 November 2008, with former Chilean president Michelle Bachelet in attendance. On 27 February 2010, during the 2010 Chile earthquake, much damage occurred to the stadium; nearly the entire Pacific gallery collapsed.

== Support and rivalries ==
In 2007, Ñublense had the fourth-highest average attendance in the Torneo de Apertura de Chile 2007 behind the "three giants of Chile": Universidad de Chile, Universidad Católica and Colo-Colo. Ñublense's fans are known as "red devils" or "reds" (the same color as Premier League team Manchester United). After the successful 2008 season when Ñublense first qualified for the Torneo de Apertura de Chile 2008 play-offs and the Copa Sudamericana 2008. That season, the team was frequently compared with Manchester United. Ñublense's record attendance was on 21 May 2008, when 18,487 fans attended the second leg of the semi-finals of the Torneo de Apertura de 2008 against Colo-Colo at the Estadio Municipal de Concepción. Curicó Unido is the most known rival. For more, visit Clásico Ñublense - Curicó Unido.

== Honours ==
=== National ===
- Segunda División
  - Winners (2): 1976, 2020
- Tercera División
  - Winners (3): 1985, 1992, 2004

=== Regional ===
- Asociación Chillán
  - Winners (6): 1921, 1933, 1936, 1938, 1939, 1940
- División de Ascenso de la Asociación Chillán
  - Winners (2): 1919, 1935
- Tercera División de la Asociación Chillán
  - Winners (2): 1917, 1938

== Statistics ==
- 16 seasons in Primera División (1977-1979; 1981; 2007-2011; 2013-2014/15; 2021– )
- 44 seasons in Primera B (1959-1976, 1980, 1982-1983, 1986-1991, 1993-2000, 2005-2006, 2012; 2015/16-2020)
- 7 seasons in Tercera División (1984-1985, 1992, 2001-2004)
- 2 participation in Copa Libertadores (2023,2025)
- 3 participations in Copa Sudamericana (2008, 2022, 2023)

== South American cups history ==
Season	Competition	Round	Country	Club	Home	Away	Aggregate
2008	Copa Sudamericana	First Round	(Peru)	Sport Áncash	1–0	0–4	1–4
2022	Copa Sudamericana	First Round	(Chile)	Unión La Calera	0–0	1–2	1–2
2023	Copa Libertadores	Group Stage; Group A	(Ecuador)	Aucas	2–1	0–0	3rd Place
2023	Copa Libertadores	Group Stage; Group A	(Brazil)	Flamengo	1–1	0–2	3rd Place
2023	Copa Libertadores	Group Stage; Group A	(Argentina)	Racing	0–2	0–4	3rd Place
2023	Copa Sudamericana	Round of Play-offs	(Chile)	Audax Italiano	0–0	1–0	1–0
2023	Copa Sudamericana	Round of 16	(Ecuador)	LDU Quito	0–1	3–2	3–3(3-4p)

== Club records ==
- Record league victory: 6–0 vs. Cobreloa in 2024 Primera División de Chile (April 27, 2024)
- Record league defeat: 1–8 vs. Naval in 1981 Primera División (Jan 2, 1982)
- Record Copa Chile victory — 6–1 vs. Iberia Bío-Bío (1977)
- Record attendance: 18,487 vs. Colo-Colo (May 21, 2008) 2008-A (at Municipal de Concepción)
- Most league goals scored (overall): 44 Manuel Villalobos (2005–07)
- Most goals scored (Primera División matches): 26 Luis Flores (2007-2010)
- Primera División best position: 1st, regular season (2008-A)
- Copa Chile best season: Second Place (2024)

== Players ==
=== Current squad ===
Current squad of Ñublense as of 26 July 2026 (edit)
Sources: ANFP Official Web Site

No.		Position	Player
1	URU	GK	Nicola Pérez
2	CHI	DF	Felipe Reyes
3	CHI	DF	Carlos Salomón
4	CHI	DF	Osvaldo Bosso
5	CHI	DF	Felipe Campos
6	ARG	DF	Pablo Calderón
7	PAR	FW	Fernando Ovelar (loan from Pachuca)
8	ARG	MF	Gabriel Graciani
9	ARG	FW	Franco Rami (loan from Belgrano)
10	CHI	MF	Matías Plaza
11	CHI	FW	Lucas Molina
12	CHI	GK	Claudio Chandía
13	CHI	FW	Daniel Saavedra
14	CHI	DF	Jovany Campusano
15	CHI	DF	Sebastián Valencia
16	CHI	DF	Diego Sanhueza
17	CHI	FW	Pablo Toledo

No.		Position	Player
18	CHI	MF	Diego Céspedes
19	ARG	MF	Ignacio Tapia (loan from Belgrano)
20	CHI	FW	Ignacio Jeraldino (loan from Unión Española)
21	CHI	MF	Lorenzo Reyes (c)
22	CHI	FW	Alex Valdés
23	CHI	DF	Joaquín González
24	CHI	MF	Crisstofer Montecinos
25	CHI	GK	Hernán Muñoz
26	CHI	FW	Esteban Calderón (loan from O'Higgins)
27	CHI	DF	Vicente Guzmán
28	CHI	MF	Manuel Rivera
29	CHI	FW	Giovanny Ávalos
31	CHI	MF	Justin Poblete
33	CHI	FW	Martín Araneda
35	CHI	MF	León Mansilla
36	CHI	FW	Bastián Muñoz

Manager: Juan José Ribera

=== 2026 Summer transfers ===
==== In ====
Note: Flags indicate national team as defined under FIFA eligibility rules; some limited exceptions apply. Players may hold more than one non-FIFA nationality.

No.	Pos.	Nation	Player
—	FW	CHI	Esteban Calderón (loan from O'Higgins)

==== Out ====
Note: Flags indicate national team as defined under FIFA eligibility rules; some limited exceptions apply. Players may hold more than one non-FIFA nationality.

No.	Pos.	Nation	Player

== Managers ==
- (Chile) Guillermo Báez (1958)
- (Argentina) Martín García (1959)
- (Uruguay) Adolfo Rodríguez (1961)
- (Chile) Enrique Sorrel (1962)
- (Chile) Daniel Chirinos (1964)
- (Chile) Lincoyán Neira (1965)
- (Chile) Caupolicán Peña (1966)
- (Chile) Óscar Andrade (1968)
- (Chile) Guillermo Montenegro (1968)
- (Argentina) Héctor Pedutto (1970)
- (Chile) Pedro Morales (1971)
- (Chile) Leonardo Bedoya (1972–1973)
- (Chile) Luis Ibarra (1975)
- (Chile) Ramón Climent (1976)
- (Chile) Isaac Carrasco (1976)
- (Chile) Francisco Coloma (1977)
- (Uruguay) Roberto Scarone (1977)
- (Chile) Enrique Hormazábal (1977)
- (Chile) Eugenio Jara (1978)
- (Chile) Nelson Oyarzún (1978)
- (Chile) Juan Carlos Gangas (1978)
- (Chile) Álex Veloso (1978)
- (Chile) Hernán Godoy (1979)
- (Chile) Manuel Rodríguez Vega (1980)
- (Chile) Héctor Jara (1981)
- (Chile) Juan Rodríguez Vega (1981)
- (Chile) David Gaete (1981–1982)
- (Chile) Guillermo Yávar (1983)
- (Chile) Álex Veloso (1984–1985)
- (Chile) Leonidas Palacios (1985)
- (Chile) Esaú Bravo (1985–1986)
- (Chile) Humberto Cruz (1986)
- (Chile) Isaac Carrasco (1987–1988)
- (Chile) Jaime Campos (1988)
- (Chile) Esaú Bravo (1988)
- (Chile) Juan Inostroza (1989)
- (Chile) Manfredo González (1990)
- (Chile) Sergio Gutiérrez (1990)
- (Chile) Rolando García (1991)
- (Chile) Esaú Bravo (1992–1993)
- (Chile) Luis Godoy (1993)
- (Chile) Eduardo de la Barra (1993–1994)
- (Chile) Esaú Bravo (1994–1995)
- (Chile) Hugo Solís (1996)
- (Chile) Rolando García (1996)
- (Chile) Manfredo González (1996)
- (Chile) Rodolfo Venegas (1997)
- (Chile) Esaú Bravo (1997–1998)
- (Chile) Eduardo Cortázar (1998)
- (Argentina) Daniel Montilla (1999)
- (Chile) Eduardo Cortázar (1999)
- (Chile) Jaime Vera (2000)
- (Chile) Julio Suazo (2000)
- (Chile) Esaú Bravo (2000)
- (Chile) Manuel Lara (2001)
- (Chile) Héctor Pineda (2001)
- (Chile) Manfredo González (2001)
- (Chile) Eduardo Cortázar (2002)
- (Chile) Pedro Pablo Díaz (2003)
- (Chile) Esaú Bravo (2004)
- (Chile) Luis Marcoleta (2004–2007)
- (Chile) Fernando Díaz (2008–2009)
- (Chile) Ricardo Toro (2009)
- (Chile) Óscar del Solar (2010)
- (Chile) Ricardo Toro (2010)
- (Chile) Luis Marcoleta (2010–2011)
- (Chile) Jorge Garcés (2011)
- (Chile) Carlos Rojas (2011–2013)
- (Argentina) Pablo Abraham (2013–2014)
- (Chile) Ivo Basay (2014–2015)
- (Chile) Fernando Díaz (2015–2016)
- (Argentina) Pablo Abraham (2016–2017)
- (Chile) Rubén Espinoza (2017)
- (Chile) Emiliano Astorga (2017–2018)
- (Chile) Vicente Núñez (2018)
- (Argentina) Germán Cavalieri (2018–2019)
- (Chile) Jaime García (2019–2023)
- (Chile) Hernán Caputto (2023)
- (Chile) Mario Salas (2024)
- (Chile) Francisco Arrué (2025)
- (Chile) Alejandro Gaete (2025)
- (Chile) Ronald Fuentes (2025)
- (Chile) Juan José Ribera (2026–)
