= Agustín Salvatierra =

Chilean footballer (born 1970)

Personal information
- Full name: Agustín Alex Salvatierra Concha
- Date of birth: 7 December 1970 (age 55)
- Place of birth: Peñaflor, Chile
- Position: Defender

Team information
- Current team: Atlético Oriente (manager)

Senior career*
Years	Team	Apps	(Gls)
1987–1995	Colo-Colo		
1996–2000	Palestino		
2000–2001	Veracruz		
2001	Deportes Puerto Montt		
2003	Perseden Denpasar		
2004	BEC Tero Sasana		

International career
1996	Chile	1	(0)

Managerial career
- 2009–2016: Colo-Colo (youth)
- 2016–2018: Colo-Colo (assistant)
- 2017: Colo-Colo (interim)
- 2018–2020: Colo-Colo (youth)
- 2021: Barnechea (assistant)
- 2022: Deportes Temuco (assistant)
- 2024–: Atlético Oriente
- * Club domestic league appearances and goals

Agustín Alex Salvatierra Concha (born 7 December 1970) is a Chilean former professional footballer who played as a defender for Colo-Colo, Palestino and Deportes Puerto Montt in Chile and Veracruz in Mexico. He made one appearance for Chile national team in 1996. Salvatierra took charge of Colo-Colo on an interim basis in 2018 following the departure of Pablo Guede.

== As manager ==
- Colo-Colo (youth) 2009–2020
- Colo-Colo (assistant) 2016–2018
- Colo-Colo (caretaker) 2017
- Barnechea (assistant) 2021
- Deportes Temuco (assistant) 2022
- Atlético Oriente 2024–Present

== Titles ==
- Colo-Colo 1989, 1990, 1991 and 1993 (Chilean Primera División Championship), 1992 (Recopa Sudamericana and Copa Interamericana), 1988, 1989, 1990 and 1994 (Copa Chile)
