= Alejandro Gaete =

Chilean footballer (born 1986)

Personal information
- Full name: Alejandro Humberto Gaete Duarte
- Date of birth: 25 January 1986 (age 40)
- Place of birth: Santiago, Chile
- Height: 1.79 m (5 ft 10 in)
- Position: Centre-back

Team information
- Current team: Ñublense (youth manager)

Youth career
- 2004–2006: Universidad Católica

Senior career*
Years	Team	Apps	(Gls)
2007	Ñublense	2	(0)
2007	Coquimbo Unido	4	(0)
2008	Deportes Ovalle	39	(2)
2009	Unión La Calera	10	(0)
2009–2014	U. de Concepción	86	(0)
2014	Everton	6	(0)
2015–2016	Deportes Concepción	43	(3)
2016–2017	Coquimbo Unido	11	(0)
2017–2018	San Marcos de Arica	37	(1)
2019	Independiente de Cauquenes		

Managerial career
- 2023–: Ñublense (youth)
- 2025: Ñublense (interim)
- * Club domestic league appearances and goals

Alejandro Humberto Gaete Duarte (born 25 January 1986) is a Chilean football manager and former player who played as a centre-back. He is the current manager of Ñublense's youth categories.

== Honours ==
=== Club ===
Universidad Católica

- Primera División de Chile (1): 2005 Clausura

Deportes Ovalle

- Copa Chile (1): Runner-up 2008–09
