= Estadio Independencia (Chile) =

Stadium in Chile

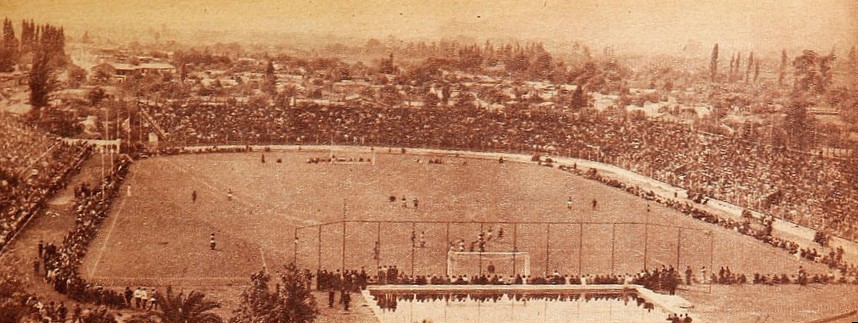
- Interactive map of Estadio Independencia
- Full name: Estadio Independencia
- Location: Santiago, Chile
- Owner: Universidad Católica
- Capacity: 16,400

Construction
- Opened: 12 October 1945
- Closed: 1967
- Demolished: 1971
- Architects: Augusto Gómez and Enrique Cazorso

Tenants
- Major sporting events hosted; 1946 Latin American Amateur Boxing Championship; 1949 Torneo de Consuelo Final; 1950 Campeonato de Apertura Final; 1954 Todo competidor Asociación Santiago Athletics Tournament; 1961, 1962 Copa Chile; 1965, 1966, 1967 Definition of the Chilean Reserve Tournament

Estadio Independencia was a multi-use stadium in Santiago, Chile. Among the events held at this venue were football matches, boxing nights (including a Latin American championship), athletics championships, and others.

The Estadio Independencia was the third of four stadiums that have been owned by the Chilean club Universidad Católica, preceded by the Estadio Universidad Católica and Campos de Sports de Ñuñoa, and followed by the Estadio San Carlos de Apoquindo (currently known as Claro Arena for commercial reasons). This sports venue was located in the commune of Independencia, Chile.

== History ==
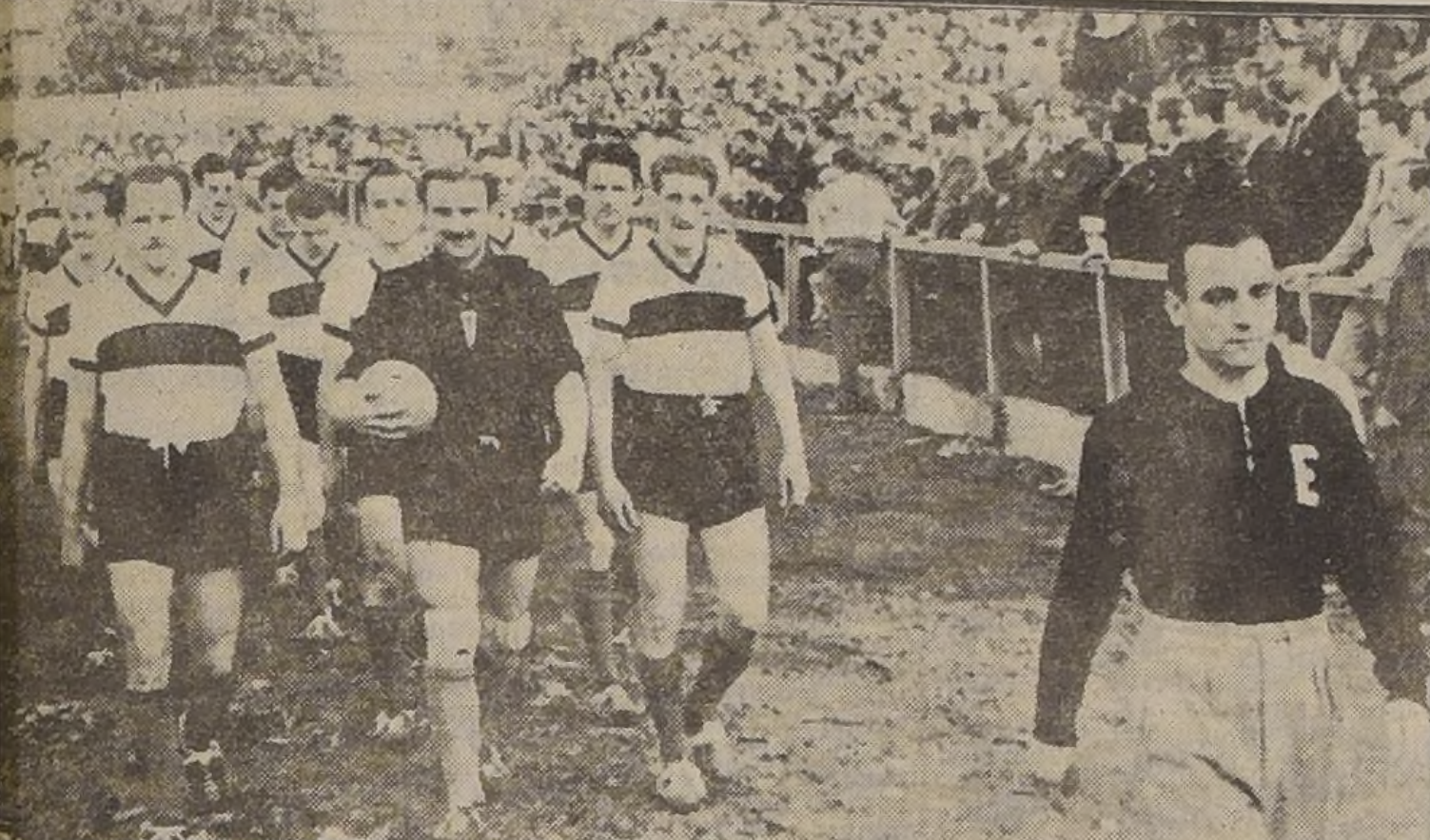
Universidad Católica players took part in the opening ceremony.

After having the Estadio Universidad Católica, used primarily as a training field and for other sports, and the Campos de Sports de Ñuñoa, in the 1940s Universidad Católica planned the construction of a new venue in the commune of Independencia, Santiago de Chile.

On October 12, 1945, Universidad Católica faced a representative of the Universidad de Concepción in a friendly match. Católica won 4-2 after coming back from a 2-0 deficit. Católica's first goal at this stadium was scored by Antonio Ciraolo, although the club's first goal in official matches played at this venue was scored by Pedro Sáez.

In addition to being used for decisive football matches, such as the finals of the Copa Chile, the Campeonato de Apertura, and the Torneo de Consuelo, the stadium hosted a Latin American Boxing Championship in 1946, the same one held years earlier at the Estadio Universidad Católica in 1929, and a Asociación Santiago Athletics Tournament in 1954, among other events.
