= Campos de Sports de Ñuñoa =

Former stadium in Santiago, Chile

Coordinates: 33.457288°S 70.609445°W

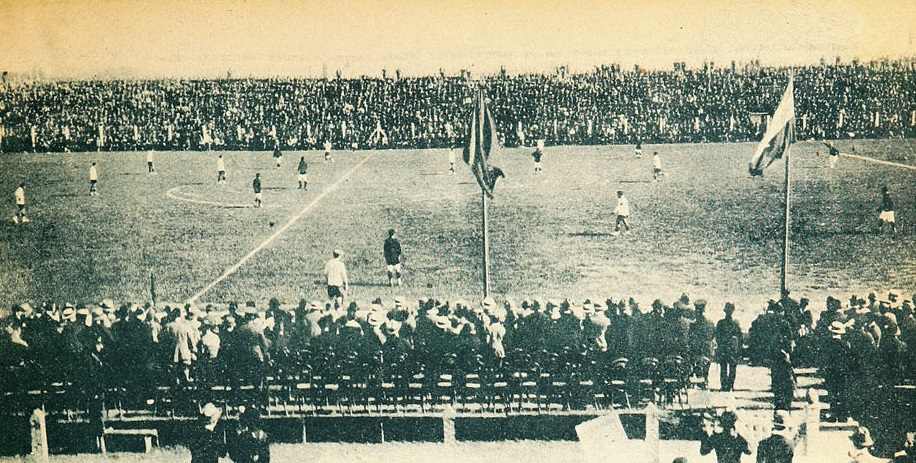
- Interactive map of Campos de Sports de Ñuñoa
- Full name: Estadio Campos de Sports de Ñuñoa
- Location: Santiago, Chile
- Owner: PUC (1927-1938); Universidad Católica (1927-1934); Universidad Católica (1937-1938)
- Capacity: 20,000

Construction
- Closed: 1938

Tenants
- Universidad Católica; Chile national football team: Major sporting events hosted; 1920, 1927 South American Championships in Athletics; 1923 South American Lightweight Boxing Championship; 1924 Chilean Middleweight Boxing Championship; 1926 South American Championship; 1927, 1928, 1929, 1930 Universidad Católica day; 1930 UC Federation Novice Athletics Championship; 1930 UC Federation Football Apertura Championship; 1930 Athletic UC Federation Tournament; 1930, 1937 UC Federation Football Tournament; 1933 Chilean Primera División final; 1933, 1934, 1938 Campeonato de Apertura final; 1937 Absolute Championship

Campos de Sports de Ñuñoa (English: Ñuñoa sports fields) was a multi-use stadium in Santiago, Chile. It was the home ground of the Chile national football team until the current Estadio Nacional de Chile opened in 1938. The stadium held 20,000 spectators. It hosted the Copa America tournament in 1926. Campos de Sports de Ñuñoa was the second of four stadiums that have been owned by the chilean club Universidad Católica, preceded by the Estadio Universidad Católica, and followed by the Estadio Independencia and the Estadio San Carlos de Apoquindo (currently known as Claro Arena for commercial reasons).

== History ==
In 1918, the land where the facility operated was donated to the State by José Domingo Cañas. Its objective was the recreation of the popular education charitable societies that the philanthropist supported. The construction of the sports complex included the creation of soccer fields, tennis courts, a playground, among other facilities. The land was located between the current José Domingo Cañas streets and Campos de Deportes.

On November 11, 1927, the Ñuñoa Sports Fields became property of the Pontificia Universidad Católica de Chile and Club Deportivo Universidad Católica (in the club's amateur stage), and, by extension, of the current club Universidad Católica, from its final foundation on April 21, 1937, due to the partnership between the university and the CDUC. The Chilean club's first venue was the Estadio Universidad Católica, built very close to the university that was the alma mater of the sports institution.

In 1938, it was demolished and replaced in terms of preponderance in Chilean sport by the Estadio Nacional Julio Martínez Prádanos complex, currently Parque Estadio Nacional, located nearby. As for the Universidad Católica, it later inaugurated the Estadio Independencia in 1945, demolished in 1971, and the Estadio San Carlos de Apoquindo, or Claro Arena, its home since 1988.

== Bibliography ==
- David Goldblatt; World Soccer Yearbook; 2002 ISBN 0-7894-8943-0
