= Manuel Rivera (footballer, born 1996) =

Chilean footballer

Personal information
- Full name: Robinson Manuel Enrique Rivera Zúñiga
- Date of birth: 17 February 1996 (age 30)
- Place of birth: Santiago, Chile
- Height: 1.75 m (5 ft 9 in)
- Position: Left midfielder

Team information
- Current team: Ñublense

Youth career
- Barnechea

Senior career*
| Years | Team | Apps | (Gls) |
| 2015–2021 | Barnechea | 102 | (8) |
| 2021–2024 | Ñublense | 96 | (1) |
| 2025 | Deportes La Serena | 22 | (1) |
| 2026– | Ñublense | 0 | (0) |
- * Club domestic league appearances and goals as of 29 December 2025

Robinson Manuel Enrique Rivera Zúñiga (born 17 February 1996), known as Manuel Rivera, is a Chilean footballer who plays as a left midfielder for Ñublense.

== Club career ==
Born in Santiago de Chile, Rivera is a product of Barnechea and made his professional debut in the 2015–16 Chilean Primera División. Later, he won the 2016–17 Segunda División Profesional de Chile and continued with them until the 2020 season.

In February 2021, Rivera switched to Ñublense in the Chilean Primera División, spending four seasons with them. A player during a successful stint in the club history, he took part in the 2022 and the 2023 Copa Sudamericana and the 2023 Copa Libertadores, scoring the winning goal in the 2–3 away against LDU Quito on 10 August 2023, the first win abroad for the club at international level.

In the 2025 season, Rivera continued in the Chilean top division with Deportes La Serena. The next year, he returned to Ñublense.
