= Gonzalo Villagra =

Chilean footballer (born 1981)

Personal information
- Full name: Gonzalo Andrés Villagra Lira
- Date of birth: 17 September 1981 (age 45)
- Place of birth: Santiago, Chile
- Height: 1.74 m (5 ft 8 1/2 in)
- Position: Midfielder

Team information
- Current team: Unión Española (manager)

Youth career
- Universidad Católica

Senior career*
Years	Team	Apps	(Gls)
2000–2004	Universidad Católica	21	(0)
2002	→ Santiago Morning (loan)	29	(2)
2004–2015	Unión Española	293	(5)
2005	→ Universidad de Concepción (loan)	17	(0)
2005	→ Palestino (loan)	18	(1)
2012	Unión Española B	3	(0)
2015–2018	Deportes Antofagasta	65	(1)
2019–2020	Santiago Morning	37	(1)
2021	Unión Española	8	(0)
Total		491	(10)

International career
2001	Chile U20		

Managerial career
- 2022–2025: Unión Española (youth)
- 2025: Unión Española (interim)
- 2026: Unión Española
- * Club domestic league appearances and goals

Gonzalo Andrés Villagra Lira (born 17 September 1981) is a Chilean football manager and former player who played as a midfielder.

== Club career ==
Villagra retired at the end of the 2021 season.

== Coaching career ==
Following his retirement, Villagra assumed as head of the Unión Española youth system and, later, as coach. In May 2025, he assumed as interim coach of the first team. Back to his former role after the arrival of Miguel Ramírez in June, he was named manager of the club on 8 November, after Ramírez resigned.

== Career statistics ==
As of match played on 18 March 2018

Appearances and goals by club, season and competition
Club	Season	League			Cup		League Cup		Other		Total	
Club	Season	Division	Apps	Goals	Apps	Goals	Apps	Goals	Apps	Goals	Apps	Goals
Unión Española	2009	Chilean Primera División	20	2	0	0	—		4	0	24	2
Unión Española	2010	Chilean Primera División	28	1	2	0	—				30	1
Unión Española	2011	Chilean Primera División	35	1	5	1	—		8	0	48	2
Unión Española	2012	Chilean Primera División	29	0	9	0	—		9	1	47	1
Unión Española	2013	Chilean Primera División	13	0	5	1	—		1	0	19	1
Unión Española	2013–14	Chilean Primera División	30	1	0	0	—		3	0	33	1
Unión Española	2014–15	Chilean Primera División	33	0	12	0	—				45	0
Unión Española	Total		188	5	33	2	0	0	25	1	246	8
Antofagasta	2015–16	Chilean Primera División	19	0	2	1	—				21	1
Antofagasta	2016–17	Chilean Primera División	29	1	2	0	—				31	1
Antofagasta	2017	Chilean Primera División	5	0	5	0	—				10	0
Antofagasta	2018	Chilean Primera División	12	0	2	0	—				14	0
Antofagasta	Total		65	1	11	1	0	0	0	0	76	2
Career totals			253	6	44	3	0	0	25	1	322	10

== Honours ==
=== Club ===
Unión Española

- Primera División de Chile (1): 2013 Transición
