= Felipe Campos (Chilean footballer) =

Chilean footballer (born 1993)

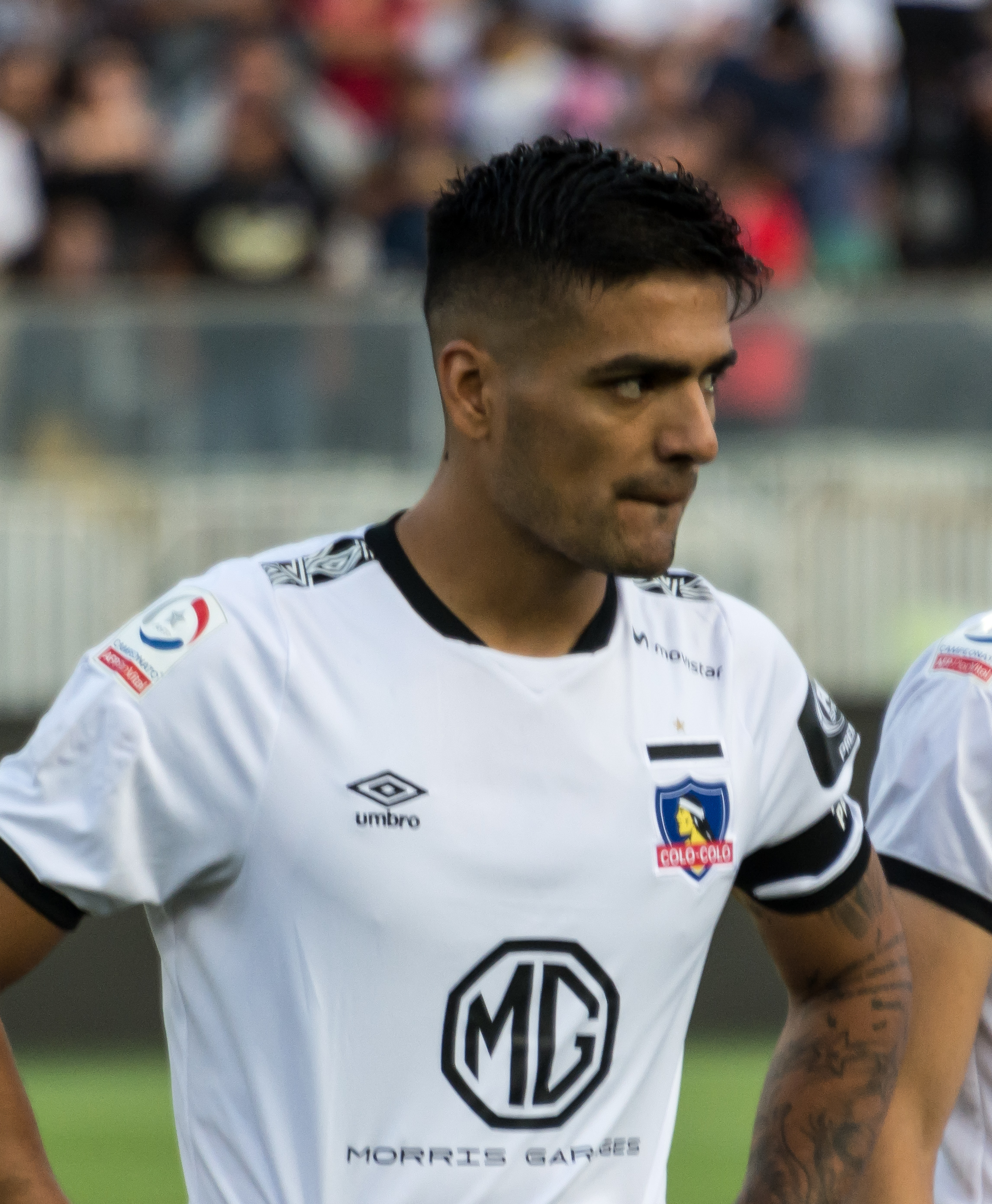
- Campos with Colo-Colo in 2020

Personal information
- Full name: Felipe Jesus Manuel Campos Mosqueira
- Date of birth: 8 November 1993 (age 33)
- Place of birth: Santiago, Chile
- Height: 1.79 m (5 ft 10 in)
- Position: Right-back

Team information
- Current team: Ñublense

Youth career
- Palestino

Senior career*
| Years | Team | Apps | (Gls) |
| 2012–2016 | Palestino | 85 | (2) |
| 2016–2021 | Colo-Colo | 78 | (0) |
| 2021–2022 | Atlético Tucumán | 19 | (0) |
| 2022–2024 | Everton | 54 | (1) |
| 2025 | Unión La Calera | 29 | (0) |
| 2026– | Ñublense | 0 | (0) |

International career^{‡}
| 2013 | Chile U20 | 10 | (0) |
- * Club domestic league appearances and goals as of 8 January 2026 ‡ National team caps and goals as of 7 July 2025

Felipe Jesús Manuel Campos Mosqueira (Note: In this Spanish name, the first or paternal surname is Campos and the second or maternal family name is Mosqueira.) (born 8 November 1993), known as Felipe Campos, is a Chilean footballer who plays as a right-back for Ñublense.

== Club career ==
Campos switched to Unión La Calera from Everton de Viña del Mar for the 2025 season.

On 7 January 2026, Campos joined Ñublense.

== International career ==
Campos was named in Chile's provisional squad for Copa América Centenario but was cut from the final squad.
