= Germán Cavalieri =

Argentine football manager

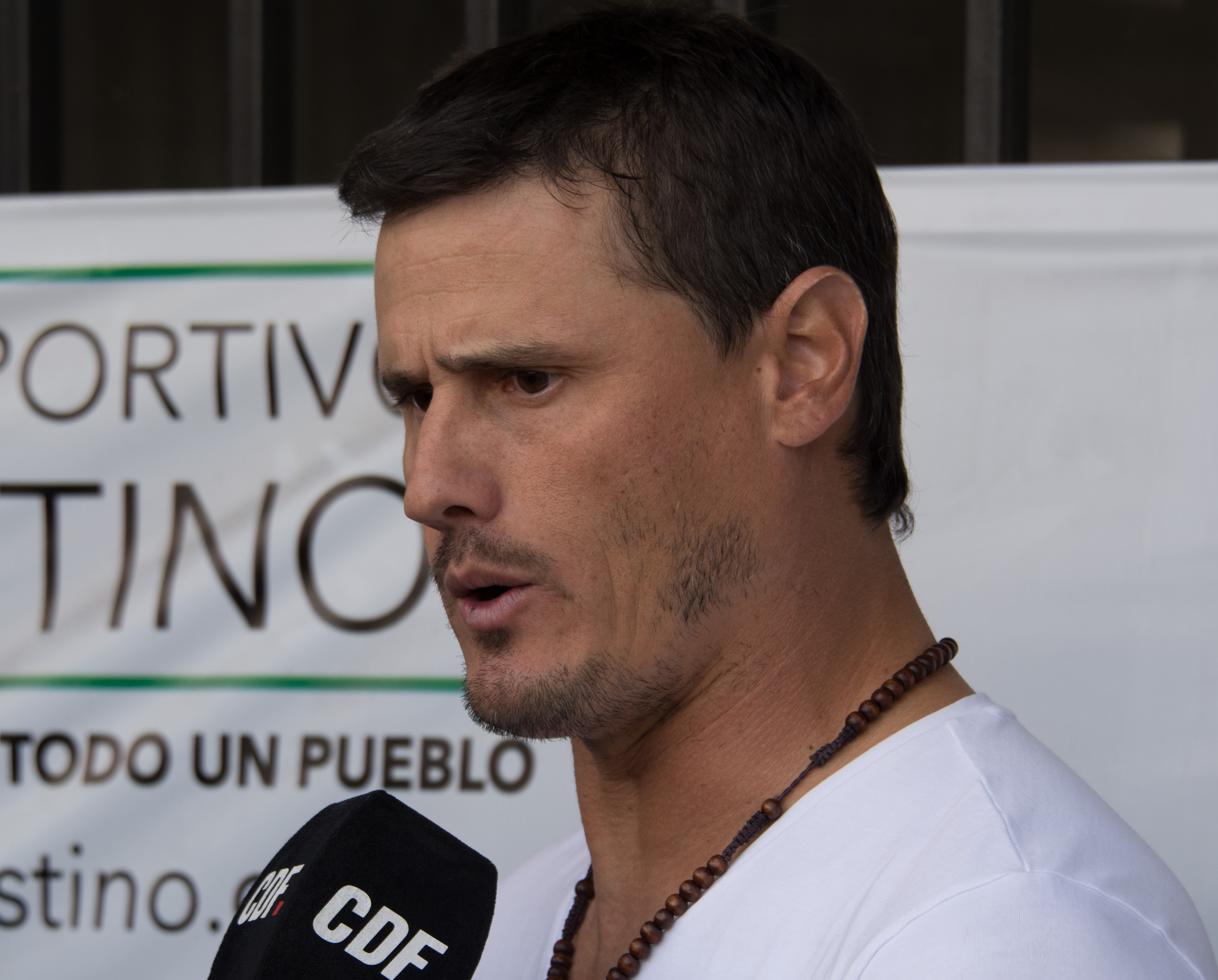
- Cavalieri in 2018

Personal information
- Full name: Germán Adrián Cavalieri
- Date of birth: 18 June 1977 (age 49)
- Place of birth: Buenos Aires, Argentina
- Position: Goalkeeper

Team information
- Current team: San Marcos (sporting director)

Youth career
- Argentinos Juniors

Senior career*
Years	Team	Apps	(Gls)
1995–1999	Comunicaciones		
1999	UAI Urquiza		
2002–2004	Comunicaciones		
2005	Liniers		
2008–2009	Sportivo Baradero		

Managerial career
- 2004: Comunicaciones (youth)
- 2005–2007: Comunicaciones (gk coach)
- 2008: San Miguel (fitness coach)
- 2010: Defensores Unidos (fitness coach)
- 2010–2014: Nueva Chicago (youth)
- 2013: Nueva Chicago (assistant)
- 2014–2015: Palestino (assistant)
- 2016: San Lorenzo (assistant)
- 2016: Mitre SdE (assistant)
- 2016–2017: Deportes Valdivia
- 2017–2018: Palestino
- 2018–2019: Ñublense
- 2020: Los Andes
- 2021: Deportes Valdivia
- 2022: Comunicaciones
- 2023: Unión San Felipe
- 2023: Rangers
- 2024–2025: San Marcos
- 2026–: San Marcos (sporting director)
- * Club domestic league appearances and goals

Germán Adrián Cavalieri (born 18 June 1977) is an Argentine football manager. He is the current sporting director of Chilean club San Marcos de Arica.

== Playing career ==
A goalkeeper, Cavalieri was trained at Argentinos Juniors and played at minor categories of the Argentine football for Comunicaciones, UAI Urquiza, Liniers and Sportivo Baradero.

== Managerial career ==
As coach, Cavalieri started serving as fitness and goalkeeping coach and coaching youth teams. From 2013 to 2016, he served as assistant coach of Pablo Guede in Nueva Chicago, Palestino and San Lorenzo de Almagro.

In 2016, Cavalieri assumed as manager of Chilean club Deportes Valdivia. He returned to Valdivia in 2021.

In 2017, Cavalieri was appointed as manager of Palestino in the Chilean Primera División. The next year, he switched to Ñublense.

After Ñublense, Cavalieri returned to Argentina to lead Los Andes in 2020. In 2022, he led Comunicaciones.

Back in Chile, Cavalieri coached Unión San Felipe (2023), Rangers de Talca (2023) and San Marcos de Arica (2024–25). The head coach of San Marcos until December 2025, he assumed as sporting director.

== Other works ==
Cavalieri graduated as a PE teacher and kinesiologist.

Cavalieri served as a preceptor at Schönthal School based in La Paternal, Argentina.

In Mexico, Cavalieri served as deputy director of school of kinesiology at the Cuauhtémoc University of Aguascalientes.
