= Claro Arena =

Football stadium in Chile

Coordinates: 33°23′45″S 70°30′02″W

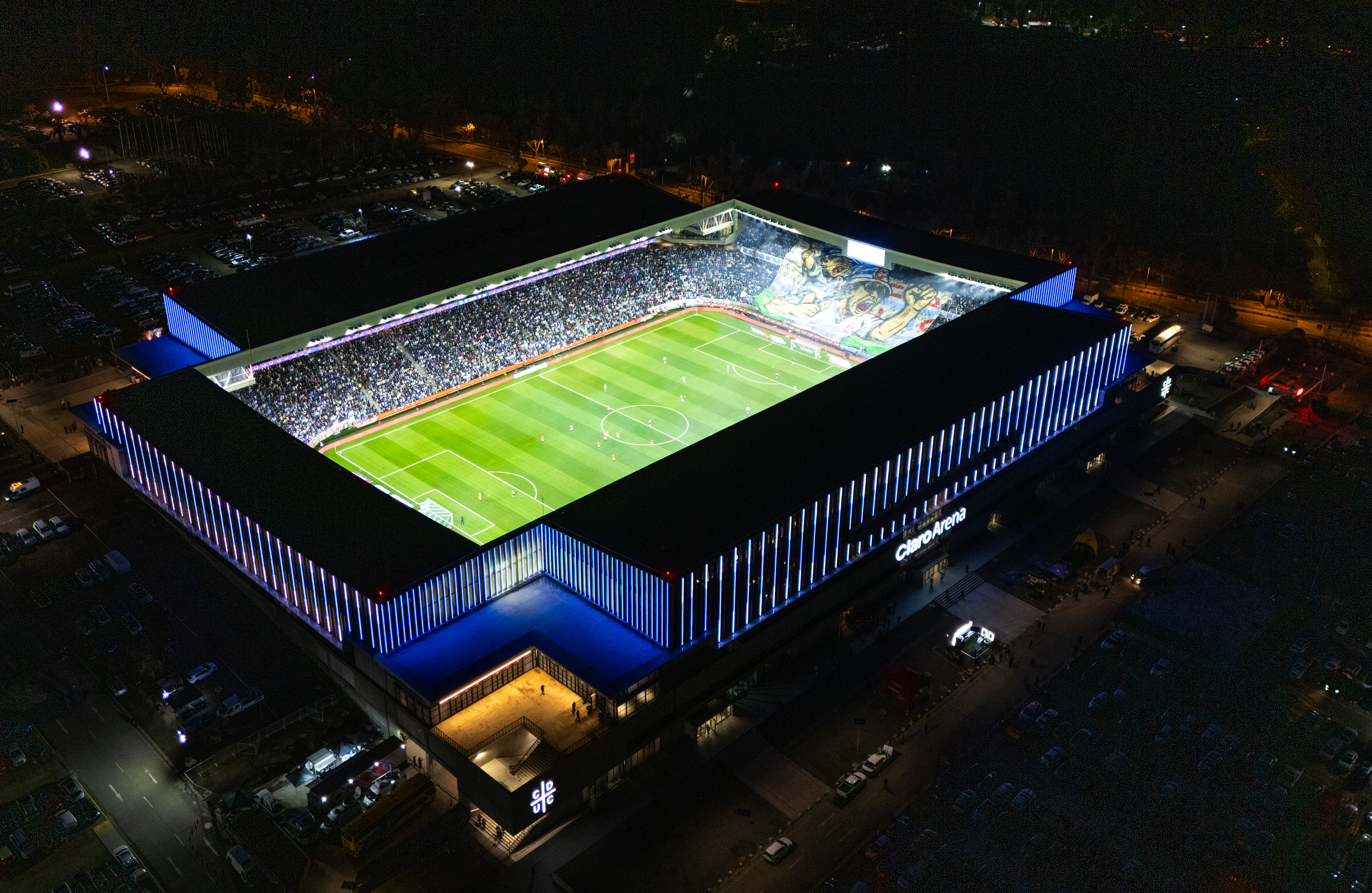
- The stadium at its reopening on August 23, 2025
- Interactive map of Claro Arena
- Location: Camino Las Flores, 13000, Las Condes, Chile
- Owner: Universidad Católica
- Operator: Universidad Católica
- Capacity: 20,249
- Surface: Artificial turf
- Record attendance: 20,936
- Field size: 108 m × 68 m (354 ft × 223 ft)

Construction
- Opened: 1988; 38 years ago
- Renovated: 1994, 2012, 2014, 2022–2024
- Architects: Esteban Barbieri (1988); César Azcárate (2024)

Tenants
- Universidad Católica; Chile national football team (selected matches): Major sporting events hosted; 1993 Copa Interamericana; 2003 Rugby World Cup qualifying; 2022 FIFA World Cup qualification

Claro Arena, formerly known as Estadio San Carlos de Apoquindo, is a football stadium, in Las Condes in the metropolitan region of Santiago de Chile. The stadium, located into the San Carlos de Apoquindo Sports Complex was built in 1988 and currently holds 20,249 people. It is used mostly for home matches stadium of the Chilean first division club Universidad Católica, which also owns the stadium.

The stadium hosted an Copa Interamericana final, among other events such as Copa Libertadores, Copa Sudamericana and Copa Mercosur matches. Chilean league championships and cups have been held at this venue, mostly in favor of Universidad Católica.

== History ==
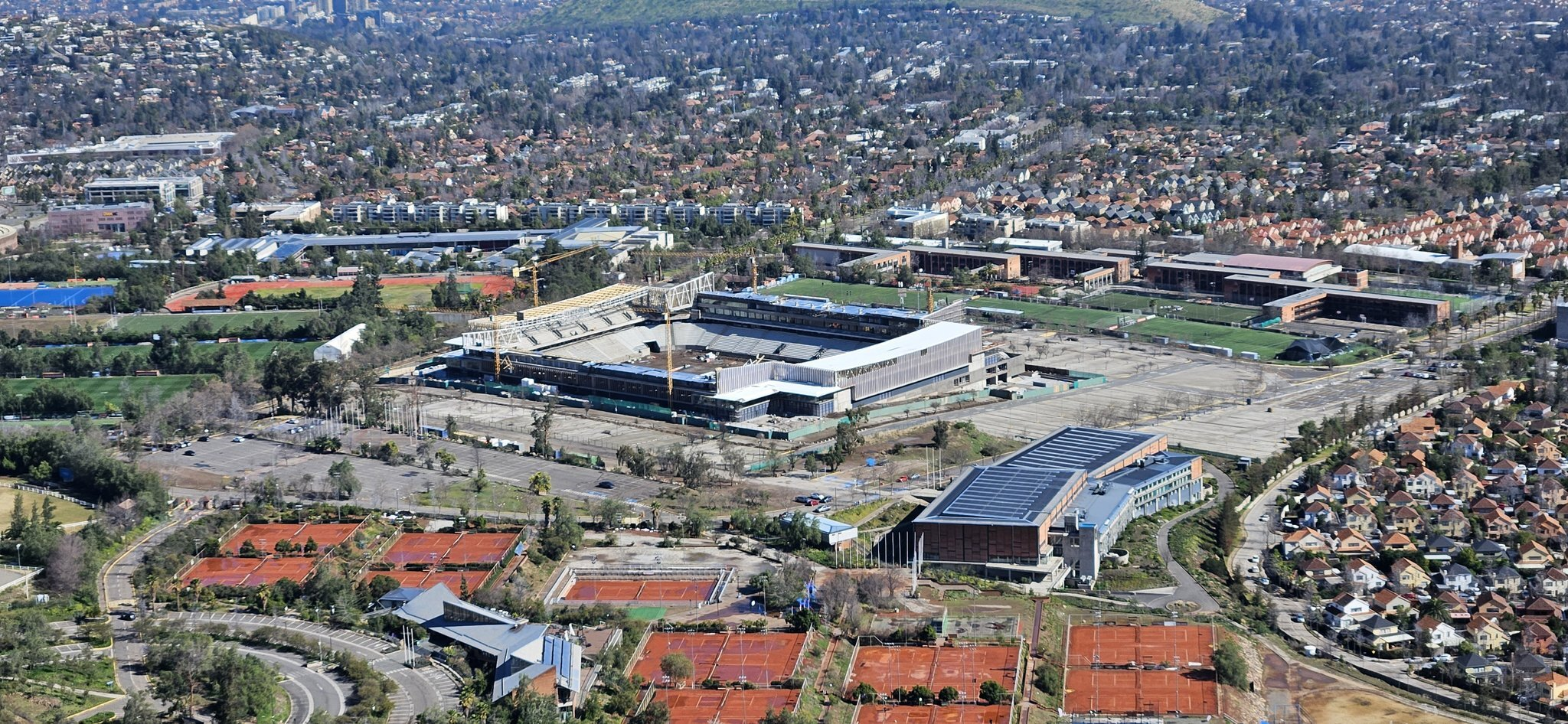
The image shows the stadium during the 2024 renovation and part of the San Carlos de Apoquindo sports complex.

Universidad Católica has owned four stadiums: Estadio Universidad Católica, located in the Maestranza and Marcoleta sector; Campos de Sports de Ñuñoa, which already had an extensive history in Chilean sports; Estadio Independencia, located in the homonymous commune of Santiago and inaugurated on October 12, 1945; and San Carlos de Apoquindo, or Claro Arena, which opened its doors on September 4, 1988. The football stadium was not the whole complex, the stadium had also rugby, athletics and some other sport fields. The highest attendance for a football match at San Carlos de Apoquindo to date is 20,936, for a 0–0 tie between Universidad Católica and Cobreloa on November 1, 1992.

Between 2022 and 2025, the stadium was remodeled. The venue seats 20,249 comfortably. The press area, locker rooms, and lighting were also improved, and a synthetic turf was installed. Although it was called Claro Arena for commercial reasons, the name San Carlos de Apoquindo remained a social reference for the venue.

== Notable events ==
Universidad Católica has won various trophies while playing home games at the San Carlos de Apoquindo, including the top-tier title in Chilean professional football (Primera División) in 2002 (Apertura tournament), 2010, 2016 (Clausura tournament), 2019, season where the team received the trophy at home without playing the last games due to the social outbreak of that year, and 2020. As for other national competitions, the stadium was host to the 2011 Copa Chile final and the 2014 Supercopa de Chile.

In 1994, Católica faced Saprissa of Costa Rica in the final of the 1993 Copa Interamericana at the stadium, winning with an aggregate score of 6–4 (3–1 in favor of each team in the home and away games, and 2–0 in extra time of the tiebreaking game). Also at the international level, in the U-17 category, Universidad Católica organizes the Copa UC, with the participation of national teams and clubs. From 1995 to the present, the stadium has been the venue for the tournament.

The stadium also hosted the Chile national football team in five matches of the 2022 World Cup qualifiers.

=== 1993 Copa Interamericana ===
November 1, 1994
Second leg

Universidad Católica (Chile)	5–1 (a.e.t.)	(Costa Rica) Deportivo Saprissa
Romero 28'; Acosta 30'; Olmos 90'; Ardiman 102'; Barrera 111'	Report	Wanchope 35'

San Carlos de Apoquindo, Santiago
Attendance: 5,500
Referee: Fernando Chappel (Peru)

=== 2022 World Cup qualifiers ===
8 June 2021
21:30 UTC−4

Chile	1–1	Bolivia
Pulgar 69'	Report	Moreno 81' (pen.)

San Carlos de Apoquindo, Santiago
Attendance: 0
Referee: Eber Aquino (Paraguay)
10 October 2021
21:00 UTC−3

Chile	2–0	Paraguay
Brereton 69'; Isla 72'	Report

San Carlos de Apoquindo, Santiago
Attendance: 10,800
Referee: Néstor Pitana (Argentina)
14 October 2021
21:00 UTC−3

Chile	3–0	Venezuela
Pulgar 18', 37'; Brereton 73'	Report

San Carlos de Apoquindo, Santiago
Attendance: 10,000
Referee: Raphael Claus (Brazil)
16 November 2021
21:15 UTC−3

Chile	0–2	Ecuador
	Report	Estupiñán 9'; M. Caicedo 90+3'

San Carlos de Apoquindo, Santiago
Attendance: 12,000
Referee: Fernando Rapallini (Argentina)
29 March 2022
20:30 UTC−3

Chile	0–2	Uruguay
	Report	L. Suárez 79'; Valverde 90'

San Carlos de Apoquindo, Santiago
Attendance: 11,000
Referee: Patricio Loustau (Argentina)

== Sporting events ==
As for other sports, the stadium has been host to national and international tournaments in various sports.

Five-a-side football

- 2026 Legendaria Cup

BMX

- 2006 Music and Urban Culture Festival

Rugby

- 2003 Rugby World Cup qualifying
- 2008 IRB Junior World Rugby Trophy
- 2008 Campeonato Central de Rugby Final
- 2021 Copa Trasandina

Rugby sevens

- 2001–02 World Sevens Series

Motorcycling

- 2003 Supercross Pro Series-Freestyle

Tennis

- 2004 Gracias Chile Tennis Tour

== Concerts ==
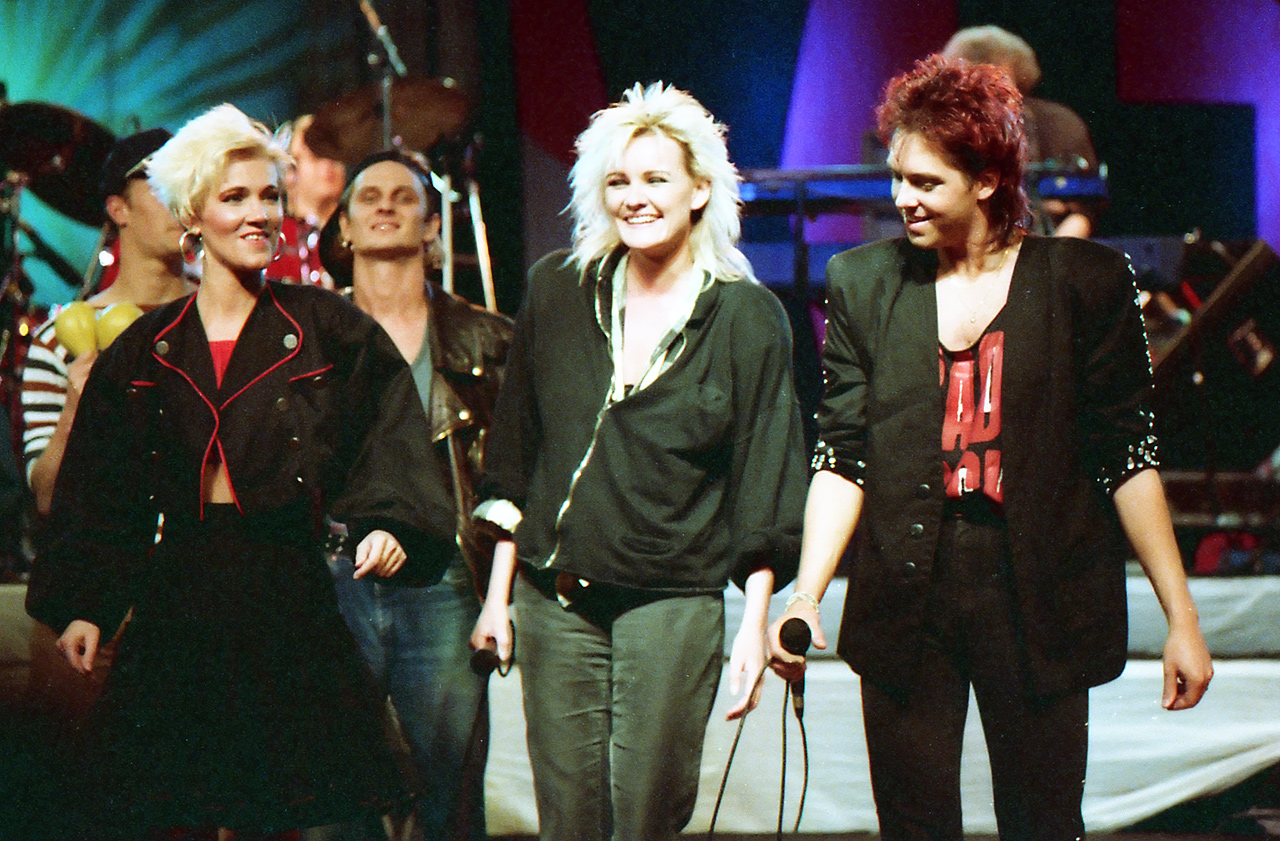
Roxette, pictured with Eva Dahlgren in 1987, drew a crowd of 45,000 spectators at San Carlos de Apoquindo, a record set in 1992.

The stadium has hosted concerts by famous artists, spanning many different genres. The number of recitals performed that same year in San Carlos is recorded in parentheses. In italics are the artists who were part of supporting acts or opening acts.

Decade	Artists
1980s	UB40, Gloria Simonetti, Miguel Zabaleta
1990s	Luciano Pavarotti, Roxette, Luis Miguel, Simply Red, Pat Metheny, José Carreras, INXS, James Taylor, Sting, Eros Ramazzotti, Whitney Houston, Phil Collins, Oasis, Andrea Bocelli.
2000s	Chayanne, Luis Miguel, Miguel Bosé, The Chemical Brothers, The Mars Volta, PJ Harvey, Morrissey, Electric Six, Gustavo Cerati, Death in Vegas, Rinôçérôse, Blondie, Gufi, Avril Lavigne, Mudhoney, Pearl Jam, La Oreja de Van Gogh, Ian Brown, The Bravery, The Rasmus, The Black Eyed Peas, Tom Jones, Lucybell, Placebo, Björk, Journey, Peter Frampton, Earth, Wind & Fire, Rod Stewart, Queen + Paul Rodgers.
2010s	Joe Vasconcellos.
2020s	Los Jaivas, Los Tres, Javiera y Los Imposibles, David Lebón, Adrián y Deborah Chauque, Nicole, Lionel Richie, Ricky Martin, Claudio Valenzuela, Rod Stewart, Francisco Victoria, Miranda!, Jinny Jopler, Hermanos Ilabaca, Los Fabulosos Cadillacs, Pacífico, Christopher Cross, Toto, Los Tetas, Joy (Anonymous), Jamiroquai, Joe Vasconcellos, Ian Lucas, Fede Vigevani, 31 Minutos.

Along with some of those already mentioned, there were other artists who performed at the old Events Center (Centro de Eventos), attached to the stadium. These include Lisa Stansfield, Gal Costa, Camilo Sesto and Air Supply.

=== Video clips & music ===
Part of Pearl Jam's "World Wide Suicide" clip was filmed in the dresser rooms of the stadium.

Roxette's hit "It Must Have Been Love" (Live In San Carlos de Apoquindo) was included in their Tourism album (1992). In the booklet it reads: Vocals: Marie Fredriksson / Backing vocals: 45.000 Chilean fans.

== Honours ==
- Outstanding Project of the Year 2025 in Infrastructure, awarded by the Association of Engineering Consulting Companies of Chile.
- Sustainability Delivery Award, The Stadium Business Design & Development Awards 2025, Manchester, Inglaterra.
- Building of the Year 2026, Sports Architecture, ArchDaily.
