= 2021 Campeonato Nacional Primera División =

Campeonato Nacional
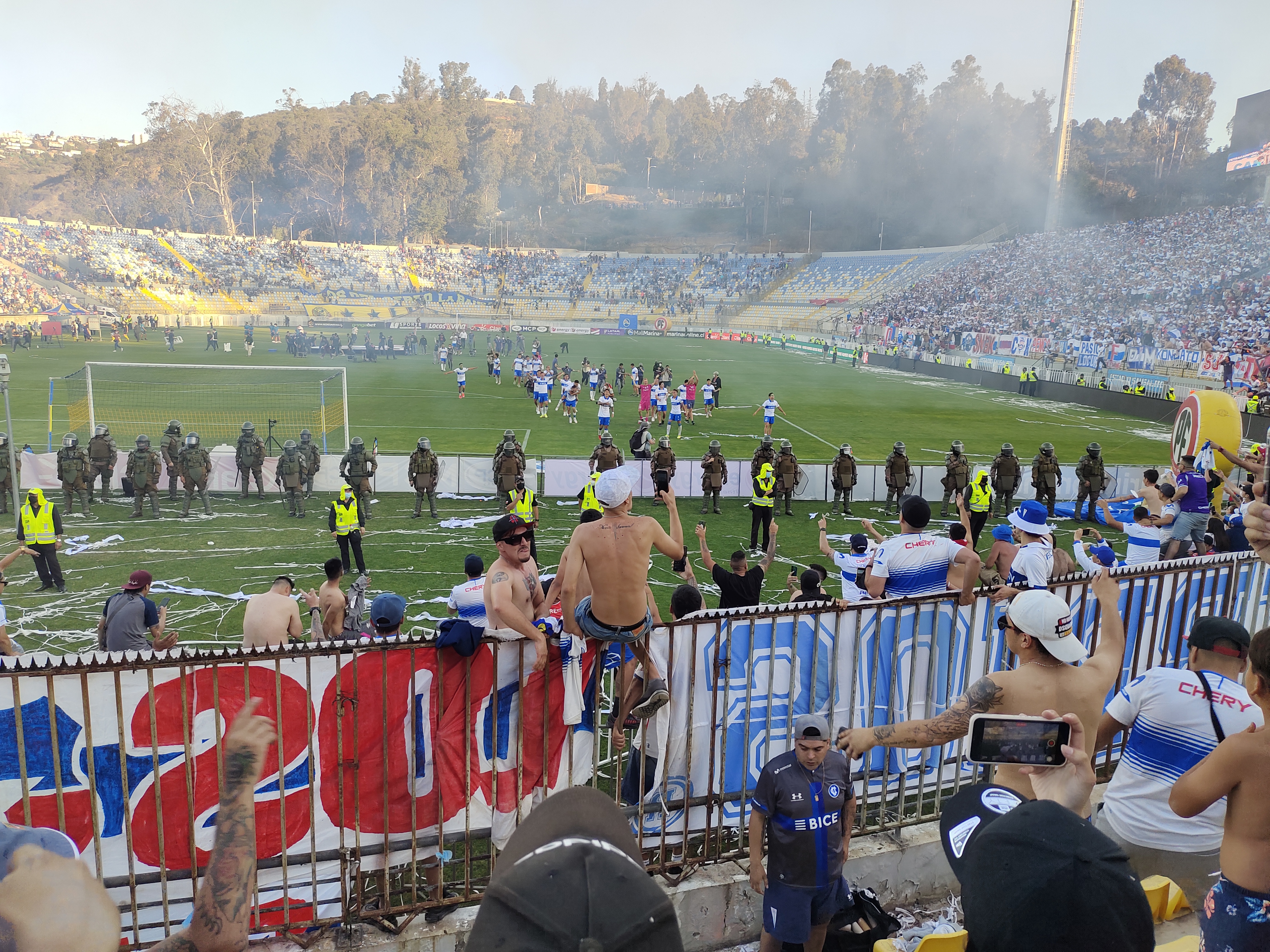
- Celebrations of Universidad Católica players and fans after winning a fourth straight championship.
- Season: 2021
- Dates: 27 March – 5 December 2021
- Champions: Universidad Católica (16th title)
- Relegated: Deportes Melipilla; Santiago Wanderers
- Copa Libertadores: Universidad Católica; Colo-Colo; Audax Italiano; Everton (via Copa Chile)
- Copa Sudamericana: Unión La Calera; Unión Española; Deportes Antofagasta; Ñublense
- Matches: 272
- Goals: 681 (2.5 per match)
- Top goalscorer: Gonzalo Sosa; Fernando Zampedri (23 goals each)
- Biggest home win: Ñublense 6–1 Unión Española (13 November)
- Biggest away win: Everton 0–4 La Serena (30 April); S. Wanderers 0–4 Colo-Colo (29 July)
- Highest scoring: Huachipato 5–3 Ñublense (16 April)
- Longest winning run: Universidad Católica (7 matches)
- Longest unbeaten run: Colo-Colo (10 matches)
- Longest winless run: Santiago Wanderers (17 matches)
- Longest losing run: Santiago Wanderers (8 matches)

The 2021 Chilean Primera División, known as Campeonato PlanVital 2021 for sponsorship purposes, was the 91st season of the Chilean Primera División, Chile's top-flight football league. The season began on 27 March and ended on 5 December 2021. Universidad Católica were the defending champions, and won their fourth straight title in the competition, and sixteenth overall, after a 3–0 away win over Everton on 4 December 2021, the last matchday of the season.

== Format ==
In early February 2021, several bodies floated format proposals for the 2021 season, considering that the 2020 and 2021 editions of both the Copa Chile and Supercopa de Chile still needed to be played. ANFP considered playing a tournament with two stages, starting from late March. In the first stage, the 17 teams would play each other in a single round-robin tournament with the teams being split for the second stage in two groups: the top eight teams would play against each other for the championship, four Copa Libertadores berths and two Copa Sudamericana ones, while the remaining nine teams would play to avoid relegation, with the top team of that group also qualifying for the Copa Sudamericana. Three teams would be relegated: two teams directly and another one in a play-off. Meanwhile, the players union Sifup proposed to play a double round-robin tournament from April to December with two relegations, the 2020 Copa Chile in the first semester of 2021 and a league cup involving the Primera División teams in the second semester, with league broadcaster TNT Sports supporting a double round-robin tournament, or two short tournaments with play-offs in case the long tournament proposal was not feasible.

On 2 March 2021, ANFP's Council of Presidents voted to approve the format for the season. It was eventually decided to play a double round-robin tournament with the top three teams after 34 rounds qualifying for the Copa Libertadores, with a fourth berth being awarded to the 2021 Copa Chile champions. The teams placed from fourth to seventh place will qualify for the Copa Sudamericana, while the bottom two teams were relegated to Primera B, with the team placed third-from-bottom playing a double-legged play-off against the winners of the Primera B play-offs.

== Teams ==
17 teams took part in the league in this season, down by one from the previous season: 15 teams from the 2020 tournament, plus the 2020 Primera B champions Ñublense and Deportes Melipilla, winners of the Primera B promotion play-offs. Ñublense returned to the top flight after five and a half years, while Deportes Melipilla played in Primera División after 13 years. Both promoted teams replaced Coquimbo Unido, Deportes Iquique, and Universidad de Concepción, who were relegated to Primera B at the end of the 2020 season.

=== Stadia and locations ===
Locations of the 2021 Chilean Primera División teams.

Team	City	Stadium	Capacity
Audax Italiano	Santiago (La Florida)	Bicentenario de La Florida (Note: Audax Italiano played their home matches at Estadio El Teniente in Rancagua since Estadio Bicentenario de La Florida is being used as a vaccination center for COVID-19.)	12,000
Cobresal	El Salvador	El Cobre	12,000
Colo-Colo	Santiago (Macul)	Monumental David Arellano	47,347
Curicó Unido	Curicó	La Granja	8,278
Deportes Antofagasta	Antofagasta	Calvo y Bascuñán	21,178
Deportes La Serena	La Serena	La Portada	18,243
Deportes Melipilla	Melipilla	Roberto Bravo Santibáñez	6,000
Everton	Viña del Mar	Sausalito	22,360
Huachipato	Talcahuano	Huachipato-CAP Acero	10,500
Ñublense	Chillán	Nelson Oyarzún Arenas	12,000
O'Higgins	Rancagua	El Teniente	13,849
Palestino	Santiago (La Cisterna)	Municipal de La Cisterna	8,000
Santiago Wanderers	Valparaíso	Elías Figueroa Brander	20,575
Unión Española	Santiago (Independencia)	Santa Laura-Universidad SEK	19,000
Unión La Calera	La Calera	Nicolás Chahuán Nazar	9,200
Universidad Católica	Santiago (Las Condes)	San Carlos de Apoquindo	14,118
Universidad de Chile	Santiago (Ñuñoa)	Nacional Julio Martínez Prádanos (Note: Universidad de Chile played their home matches at Estadio El Teniente in Rancagua since Estadio Nacional Julio Martínez Prádanos is closed for remodeling works for the 2023 Pan American Games.)	48,665

=== Personnel and kits ===
Team	Head coach	Kit manufacturer	Sponsors
Audax Italiano	(Argentina) Pablo Sánchez	Macron	Traverso
Cobresal	(Chile) Gustavo Huerta	KS7	PF
Colo-Colo	(Argentina) Gustavo Quinteros	Adidas	Pilsen del Sur
Curicó Unido	(Chile) Damián Muñoz	OneFit	Multihogar
Deportes Antofagasta	(Chile) Diego Reveco (caretaker)	Claus-7	Minera Escondida
Deportes La Serena	(Chile) Ivo Basay	Macron	Betano
Deportes Melipilla	(Argentina) Cristián Arán	Training	Ariztía
Everton	(Argentina) Roberto Sensini	Charly	Claro
Huachipato	(Chile) Mario Salas	OneFit	PF
Ñublense	(Chile) Jaime García	OneFit	Fanaloza
O'Higgins	(Chile) Miguel Ramírez	Adidas	Sun Monticello
Palestino	(Argentina) Patricio Graff	Capelli Sport	Bank of Palestine
Santiago Wanderers	(Chile) Jorge Garcés	Macron	TCL
Unión Española	(Chile) César Bravo	Kappa	Universidad SEK
Unión La Calera	(Argentina) Francisco Meneghini	Siker	PF
Universidad Católica	(Argentina) Cristian Paulucci	Under Armour	BICE
Universidad de Chile	(Chile) Cristián Romero (caretaker)	Adidas	Petrobras

=== Managerial changes ===
Team	Outgoing manager	Manner of departure	Date of vacancy	Position in table	Incoming manager	Date of appointment
Deportes Antofagasta	(Chile) Héctor Tapia	End of contract	14 February 2021	Pre-season	(Chile) Juan José Ribera	22 February 2021
Santiago Wanderers	(Chile) Miguel Ramírez	End of contract	16 February 2021	Pre-season	(Chile) Ronald Fuentes	18 February 2021
Unión La Calera	(Argentina) Juan Pablo Vojvoda	Mutual consent	18 February 2021	Pre-season	(Argentina) Luca Marcogiuseppe	1 March 2021
Universidad Católica	(Argentina) Ariel Holan	Use of exit clause	18 February 2021	Pre-season	(Uruguay) Gustavo Poyet	28 February 2021
Unión Española	(Chile) Jorge Pellicer	Sacked	3 May 2021	14th	(Chile) César Bravo	3 May 2021
Santiago Wanderers	(Chile) Ronald Fuentes	Resigned	8 May 2021	17th	(Chile) Víctor Rivero	13 May 2021
Universidad de Chile	(Venezuela) Rafael Dudamel	Mutual consent	5 June 2021	10th	(Chile) Esteban Valencia (Note: Originally as caretaker manager, appointed as manager on a permanent basis on 20 September 2021.)	6 June 2021
Santiago Wanderers	(Chile) Víctor Rivero	Mutual consent	25 June 2021	17th	(Chile) Emiliano Astorga (Note: Moisés Villarroel was caretaker manager during the 2021 Copa Chile.)	6 July 2021
Unión La Calera	(Argentina) Luca Marcogiuseppe	Mutual consent	1 July 2021	3rd	(Argentina) Francisco Meneghini	1 July 2021
Curicó Unido	(Argentina) Martín Palermo	Resigned	25 July 2021	16th	(Chile) Damián Muñoz (Note: Originally as caretaker manager, appointed as manager on a permanent basis on 21 August 2021.)	25 July 2021
O'Higgins	(Argentina) Dalcio Giovagnoli	Mutual consent	8 August 2021	11th	(Chile) Miguel Ramírez	9 August 2021
Palestino	(Chile) José Luis Sierra	Mutual consent	16 August 2021	14th	(Argentina) Patricio Graff	19 August 2021
Universidad Católica	(Uruguay) Gustavo Poyet	Mutual consent	30 August 2021	5th	(Argentina) Cristian Paulucci (Note: Originally as caretaker manager, appointed as manager on a permanent basis on 15 September 2021.)	31 August 2021
Deportes Melipilla	(Chile) John Armijo	Sacked	30 August 2021	15th	(Argentina) Cristián Arán (Note: Rodrigo Córdova was caretaker manager in the 20th and 21st round matches against Unión Española and Palestino.)	1 September 2021
Deportes La Serena	(Chile) Miguel Ponce	Sacked	31 August 2021	12th	(Chile) Óscar Correa (caretaker)	1 September 2021
Deportes La Serena	(Chile) Óscar Correa	End of caretaker spell	7 September 2021	11th	(Chile) Ivo Basay	7 September 2021
Deportes Antofagasta	(Chile) Juan José Ribera	Mutual consent	29 September 2021	9th	(Chile) Diego Reveco (caretaker)	29 September 2021
Huachipato	(Argentina) Juan Luvera	Mutual consent	17 October 2021	15th	(Chile) Mario Salas	18 October 2021
Universidad de Chile	(Chile) Esteban Valencia	Resigned	31 October 2021	12th	(Chile) Cristián Romero (caretaker)	31 October 2021
Santiago Wanderers	(Chile) Emiliano Astorga	Mutual consent	8 November 2021	17th	(Chile) Jorge Garcés (Note: Domingo Sorace was caretaker manager in the 31st round match against Curicó Unido.)	8 November 2021

== Standings ==
Pos	Team	Pld	W	D	L	GF	GA	GD	Pts	Qualification or relegation
1	Universidad Católica (C)	32	22	2	8	65	34	+31	68	Qualification for Copa Libertadores group stage
2	Colo-Colo	32	19	5	8	49	26	+23	62	Qualification for Copa Libertadores group stage
3	Audax Italiano	32	14	12	6	39	31	+8	54	Qualification for Copa Libertadores second stage
4	Unión La Calera	32	15	6	11	41	40	+1	51	Qualification for Copa Sudamericana first stage
5	Unión Española	32	15	3	14	48	50	−2	48	Qualification for Copa Sudamericana first stage
6	Deportes Antofagasta	32	12	11	9	34	36	−2	47	Qualification for Copa Sudamericana first stage
7	Ñublense	32	11	11	10	49	37	+12	44	Qualification for Copa Sudamericana first stage
8	Palestino	32	11	8	13	48	50	−2	41	
9	Cobresal	32	11	7	14	40	39	+1	40	
10	Deportes La Serena	32	9	12	11	40	42	−2	39	
11	Universidad de Chile	32	10	9	13	34	37	−3	39	
12	Everton	32	10	9	13	29	35	−6	39	Qualification for Copa Libertadores second stage (Note: Since the winners of the 2021 Copa Chile, Colo-Colo, qualified for the Copa Libertadores based on league performance, the Copa Libertadores second stage berth allocated to the Copa Chile winners was transferred to the Copa Chile runners-up, Everton.)
13	O'Higgins	32	9	11	12	31	41	−10	38	
14	Curicó Unido	32	8	13	11	37	39	−2	37	
15	Huachipato (O)	32	8	13	11	36	41	−5	37	Qualification for Relegation play-off
16	Deportes Melipilla (Note: Deportes Melipilla were deducted six points due to irregularities with the contracts of footballers.) (R)	32	10	8	14	39	51	−12	32	Relegation to Primera B
17	Santiago Wanderers (R)	32	5	6	21	24	54	−30	21	Relegation to Primera B

Source: ANFP, Soccerway
Rules for classification: 1) Points, 2) Playoff game (only if needed to decide championship between two teams), 3) Goal difference, 4) Matches won, 5) Goals for, 6) Away goals for, 7) Red cards, 8) Yellow cards, 9) Drawing of lots.
(C) Champions; (O) Play-off winners; (R) Relegated

== Results ==
Home \ Away	AUD	CSL	CC	CUR	ANT	DLS	MEL	EVE	HUA	ÑUB	OHI	PAL	SW	UE	ULC	UC	UCH
Audax Italiano	—	0–0	2–0	1–1	0–0	2–1	1–0	0–2	3–3	0–3	1–0	2–3	1–0	2–0	2–3	1–0	2–1
Cobresal	1–2	—	1–2	2–0	2–0	2–0	1–1	2–2	1–1	4–1	2–3	3–1	2–1	2–0	0–1	1–3	0–0
Colo-Colo	1–1	0–1	—	2–0	2–0	2–0	1–0	2–0	2–0	0–1	1–2	1–2	3–0	0–1	0–0	2–1	1–0
Curicó Unido	2–2	1–0	0–0	—	1–1	2–0	2–0	1–1	2–2	0–0	0–2	1–1	2–1	1–2	1–1	2–4	1–2
Deportes Antofagasta	0–1	2–1	1–0	1–1	—	0–0	1–0	1–2	1–0	2–1	2–1	2–1	1–0	1–2	1–3	3–2	1–2
Deportes La Serena	0–2	2–1	1–4	2–0	1–1	—	5–1	0–2	2–2	1–0	2–0	4–3	0–0	0–0	1–2	0–2	0–0
Deportes Melipilla	1–1	2–1	2–4	1–1	1–1	1–1	—	1–0	1–2	1–1	3–1	0–1	1–1	0–3	3–3	2–0	3–0
Everton	1–2	3–0	0–2	0–0	1–1	0–4	1–2	—	1–0	0–0	1–1	1–0	1–0	2–0	1–2	0–3	1–0
Huachipato	0–0	0–0	0–2	1–4	0–1	0–0	3–1	0–0	—	5–3	0–1	1–1	2–0	1–0	0–0	2–1	1–1
Ñublense	1–0	3–1	5–1	2–0	0–0	0–1	3–0	1–1	2–2	—	0–0	2–2	1–2	6–1	0–2	0–1	1–0
O'Higgins	0–0	1–1	2–3	2–2	0–0	0–0	1–2	1–0	2–0	1–1	—	1–0	1–0	1–4	1–0	1–3	1–3
Palestino	0–2	2–1	1–2	0–2	2–4	3–3	3–1	1–1	2–0	1–4	2–2	—	2–0	3–2	1–2	3–0	0–0
Santiago Wanderers	2–2	2–1	0–4	0–3	0–1	2–2	0–3	2–1	1–4	1–2	0–0	1–1	—	1–2	1–2	0–1	2–1
Unión Española	1–1	0–1	0–1	2–1	1–1	2–1	0–2	3–2	3–1	3–2	3–2	1–3	3–1	—	2–1	3–2	2–3
Unión La Calera	1–1	1–2	1–1	1–0	2–1	1–2	2–3	1–0	0–2	1–0	2–0	2–1	0–1	1–0	—	0–2	1–4
Universidad Católica	3–1	2–1	0–0	2–1	4–0	4–3	4–0	2–0	2–0	2–2	3–0	2–1	3–2	2–1	3–0	—	1–0
Universidad de Chile	0–1	0–2	1–3	1–2	2–2	1–1	2–0	0–1	1–1	1–1	0–0	0–1	1–0	2–1	3–2	2–1	—

Source: ANFP, Soccerway
Legend: Blue = home team win; Yellow = draw; Red = away team win.

== Top scorers ==
Rank	Name	Club	Goals
1	(Argentina) Gonzalo Sosa	Deportes Melipilla	23
1	(Argentina) Fernando Zampedri	Universidad Católica	23
3	(Argentina) Joaquín Larrivey	Universidad de Chile	20
4	(Uruguay) Cristian Palacios	Unión Española	16
5	(Chile) Diego Valencia	Universidad Católica	14
6	(Chile) Bryan Carrasco	Palestino	13
7	(Venezuela) Brayan Hurtado	Cobresal	12
8	(Chile) Leandro Benegas	Curicó Unido	11
8	(Chile) Nicolás Guerra	Ñublense	11
8	(Chile) Iván Morales	Colo-Colo	11
8	(Argentina) Lautaro Palacios	Audax Italiano	11

Source: Soccerway

== Promotion/relegation play-off ==
The team placed 15th in the season table (Huachipato) played the winners of the Primera B play-offs (Deportes Copiapó) in a double-legged series, with the winner earning the right to play in the top flight for the following season.

22 January 2022
18:00 UTC−3

Deportes Copiapó	2–3	Huachipato
Jaime 32'; López 82'	Report	Nequecaur 13', 28'; García 59' (o.g.)

Estadio Luis Valenzuela Hermosilla, Copiapó
Referee: Felipe González

26 January 2022
19:00 UTC−3

Huachipato	1–0	Deportes Copiapó
Martínez 74' (pen.)	Report

Estadio Huachipato-CAP Acero, Talcahuano
Referee: Francisco Gilabert

Huachipato won 4–2 on aggregate and remained in Primera División.

== See also ==
- 2021 Primera B de Chile
- 2021 Copa Chile
