= 2022 Campeonato Nacional Primera División =

Campeonato Nacional
- Season: 2022
- Dates: 4 February – 6 November 2022
- Champions: Colo-Colo (33rd title)
- Relegated: Deportes La Serena; Deportes Antofagasta
- Copa Libertadores: Colo-Colo; Ñublense; Curicó Unido
- Copa Sudamericana: Palestino; Cobresal; Universidad Católica; Audax Italiano
- Matches: 239
- Goals: 613 (2.56 per match)
- Top goalscorer: Fernando Zampedri (18 goals)
- Biggest home win: Curicó Unido 5–0 O'Higgins (13 March); Palestino 5–0 La Serena (23 October); Palestino 5–0 Huachipato (5 November)
- Biggest away win: Palestino 0–5 Colo-Colo (20 March)
- Highest scoring: Huachipato 2–5 Unión Española (29 July); Huachipato 3–4 Unión La Calera (8 August); U. de Chile 3–4 Cobresal (5 November)
- Total attendance: 1,080,786
- Average attendance: 4,522

The 2022 Chilean Primera División, known as Campeonato PlanVital 2022 for sponsorship purposes, is the 92nd season of the Chilean Primera División, Chile's top-flight football league. The season began on 4 February 2022 and ended on 6 November 2022.

Colo-Colo clinched their thirty-third league title with two matches to go, after winning 2–0 against Coquimbo Unido on 23 October 2022. Universidad Católica were the defending champions.

== Teams ==
16 teams took part in the league in this season, down by one from the previous season: the top 14 teams from the 2021 tournament, plus the 2021 Primera B champions Coquimbo Unido and the winners of the promotion/relegation play-off Huachipato. The promoted teams replaced Santiago Wanderers, who were relegated to Primera B at the end of the 2021 season, and Deportes Melipilla, who had six points deducted from their 2021 campaign on 13 January 2022 and were also relegated.

=== Stadia and locations ===
Locations of the 2022 Chilean Primera División teams.

Team	City	Stadium	Capacity
Audax Italiano	Santiago (La Florida)	Bicentenario de La Florida (Note: Audax Italiano played some of their home matches at Estadio El Teniente in Rancagua since Estadio Bicentenario de La Florida was used as a vaccination center for COVID-19.)	12,000
Cobresal	El Salvador	El Cobre	12,000
Colo-Colo	Santiago (Macul)	Monumental David Arellano	47,347
Coquimbo Unido	Coquimbo	Francisco Sánchez Rumoroso	18,750
Curicó Unido	Curicó	La Granja	8,278
Deportes Antofagasta	Antofagasta	Calvo y Bascuñán	21,178
Deportes La Serena	La Serena	La Portada	18,243
Everton	Viña del Mar	Sausalito	22,360
Huachipato	Talcahuano	Huachipato-CAP Acero	10,500
Ñublense	Chillán	Nelson Oyarzún Arenas	12,000
O'Higgins	Rancagua	El Teniente	13,849
Palestino	Santiago (La Cisterna)	Municipal de La Cisterna	8,000
Unión Española	Santiago (Independencia)	Santa Laura-Universidad SEK	19,000
Unión La Calera	La Calera	Nicolás Chahuán Nazar	9,200
Universidad Católica	Santiago (Las Condes)	San Carlos de Apoquindo	14,118
Universidad de Chile	Santiago (Ñuñoa)	Nacional Julio Martínez Prádanos (Note: Universidad de Chile played most of their home matches at Estadio Santa Laura-Universidad SEK in Santiago since Estadio Nacional Julio Martínez Prádanos was closed for remodeling works for the 2023 Pan American Games.)	48,665

=== Personnel and kits ===
Team	Head coach	Kit manufacturer	Sponsors
Audax Italiano	(Chile) Juan José Ribera	Macron	Traverso
Cobresal	(Chile) Gustavo Huerta	KS7	CSI
Colo-Colo	(Argentina) Gustavo Quinteros	Adidas	Pilsen del Sur
Coquimbo Unido	(Chile) Fernando Díaz	Siker	Betway
Curicó Unido	(Chile) Damián Muñoz	OneFit	Multihogar
Deportes Antofagasta	(Argentina) Javier Torrente	Claus-7	Minera Escondida
Deportes La Serena	(Chile) Óscar Correa	Macron	Betano
Everton	(Argentina) Francisco Meneghini	Charly	Claro
Huachipato	(Chile) Mario Salas	OneFit	PF
Ñublense	(Chile) Jaime García	OneFit	Betway
O'Higgins	(Argentina) Mariano Soso	Adidas	LatamWin
Palestino	(Argentina) Gustavo Costas	Capelli Sport	Bank of Palestine
Unión Española	(Chile) Gustavo Canales (caretaker)	Kappa	Universidad SEK
Unión La Calera	(Argentina) Federico Vilar	Siker	Betway
Universidad Católica	(Argentina) Ariel Holan	Under Armour	BICE
Universidad de Chile	(Chile) Sebastián Miranda	Adidas	Betano

=== Managerial changes ===
Team	Outgoing manager	Manner of departure	Date of vacancy	Position in table	Incoming manager	Date of appointment
Deportes Antofagasta	(Chile) Diego Reveco	End of caretaker spell	4 December 2021	Pre-season	(Venezuela) Juan Tolisano	21 December 2021
Palestino	(Argentina) Patricio Graff	End of contract	5 December 2021	Pre-season	(Argentina) Gustavo Costas	20 December 2021
Unión La Calera	(Argentina) Francisco Meneghini	End of contract	5 December 2021	Pre-season	(Argentina) Martín Anselmi	17 December 2021
Universidad de Chile	(Chile) Cristián Romero	End of caretaker spell	5 December 2021	Pre-season	(Colombia) Santiago Escobar	9 December 2021
Audax Italiano	(Argentina) Pablo Sánchez	Resigned	6 December 2021	Pre-season	(Chile) Ronald Fuentes	16 December 2021
Everton	(Argentina) Roberto Sensini	Mutual agreement	6 December 2021	Pre-season	(Argentina) Francisco Meneghini	17 December 2021
O'Higgins	(Chile) Miguel Ramírez	End of contract	6 December 2021	Pre-season	(Argentina) Mariano Soso	10 December 2021
Coquimbo Unido	(Chile) Héctor Tapia	Resigned	4 January 2022	Pre-season	(Argentina) Patricio Graff	6 January 2022
Audax Italiano	(Chile) Ronald Fuentes	Sacked	21 March 2022	13th	(Chile) Juan José Ribera	22 March 2022
Deportes La Serena	(Chile) Ivo Basay	Sacked	16 April 2022	13th	(Chile) Óscar Correa (Note: Caretaker manager.)	18 April 2022
Deportes Antofagasta	(Venezuela) Juan Tolisano	Sacked	18 April 2022	16th	(Chile) Diego Reveco	18 April 2022
Universidad Católica	(Argentina) Cristian Paulucci	Mutual agreement	18 April 2022	9th	(Chile) Rodrigo Valenzuela	19 April 2022
Unión La Calera	(Argentina) Martín Anselmi	Mutual agreement	25 April 2022	15th	(Chile) Carlos Galdames	25 April 2022
Universidad de Chile	(Colombia) Santiago Escobar	Mutual agreement	30 April 2022	13th	(Chile) Sebastián Miranda	30 April 2022
Universidad Católica	(Chile) Rodrigo Valenzuela	End of caretaker spell	8 May 2022	12th	(Argentina) Ariel Holan	30 April 2022
Deportes La Serena	(Chile) Óscar Correa	End of caretaker spell	9 May 2022	16th	(Argentina) Pablo Marini	9 May 2022
Unión La Calera	(Chile) Carlos Galdames	End of caretaker spell	13 May 2022	12th	(Argentina) Federico Vilar	13 May 2022
Universidad de Chile	(Chile) Sebastián Miranda	End of caretaker spell	28 May 2022	10th	(Uruguay) Diego López	31 May 2022
Deportes Antofagasta	(Chile) Diego Reveco	End of caretaker spell	5 June 2022	16th	(Argentina) Javier Torrente	5 June 2022
Coquimbo Unido	(Argentina) Patricio Graff	Mutual agreement	1 August 2022	16th	(Chile) Fernando Díaz	2 August 2022
Universidad de Chile	(Uruguay) Diego López	Mutual agreement	9 September 2022	13th	(Chile) Sebastián Miranda (Note: Originally as caretaker manager, appointed on a permanent basis on 25 September 2022.)	9 September 2022
Unión Española	(Chile) César Bravo	Sacked	9 September 2022	5th	(Chile) Gustavo Canales (Note: Caretaker manager until the end of the season.)	9 September 2022
Deportes La Serena	(Argentina) Pablo Marini	Mutual agreement	24 October 2022	15th	(Chile) Óscar Correa	24 October 2022

== Standings ==
Pos	Team	Pld	W	D	L	GF	GA	GD	Pts	Qualification or relegation
1	Colo-Colo (C)	30	18	9	3	54	17	+37	63	Qualification for Copa Libertadores group stage
2	Ñublense	30	14	10	6	46	32	+14	52	Qualification for Copa Libertadores group stage
3	Curicó Unido	30	13	10	7	48	30	+18	49	Qualification for Copa Libertadores second stage
4	Palestino	30	12	10	8	45	35	+10	46	Qualification for Copa Sudamericana first stage
5	Cobresal	30	13	6	11	44	39	+5	45	Qualification for Copa Sudamericana first stage
6	Universidad Católica	30	13	6	11	41	38	+3	45	Qualification for Copa Sudamericana first stage
7	Audax Italiano	30	12	9	9	44	42	+2	45	Qualification for Copa Sudamericana first stage
8	O'Higgins	30	11	11	8	31	31	0	44	
9	Everton	30	9	15	6	40	27	+13	42	
10	Unión La Calera	30	9	12	9	36	40	−4	39	
11	Unión Española	30	10	7	13	37	44	−7	37	
12	Huachipato	30	10	5	15	32	46	−14	35	
13	Universidad de Chile	30	8	6	16	35	50	−15	30	
14	Coquimbo Unido	30	7	6	17	32	52	−20	27	
15	Deportes La Serena (R)	30	7	6	17	28	56	−28	27	Relegation to Primera B
16	Deportes Antofagasta (R)	30	6	8	16	23	37	−14	26	Relegation to Primera B

Source: ANFP, Soccerway
Rules for classification: 1) Points, 2) Playoff game (only if needed to decide championship between two teams), 3) Goal difference, 4) Matches won, 5) Goals for, 6) Away goals for, 7) Red cards, 8) Yellow cards, 9) Drawing of lots.
(C) Champions; (R) Relegated

== Results ==
Home \ Away	AUD	CSL	CC	COQ	CUR	ANT	DLS	EVE	HUA	ÑUB	OHI	PAL	UE	ULC	UC	UCH
Audax Italiano	—	2–2	1–2	1–1	1–1	0–3	3–0	1–0	1–1	1–2	2–1	3–1	0–1	0–2	3–2	2–0
Cobresal	0–1	—	0–2	2–1	2–3	2–1	1–1	0–0	2–0	1–1	2–0	1–0	2–0	3–1	3–1	1–0
Colo-Colo	1–1	2–1	—	4–0	1–1	1–0	3–0	2–0	1–0	0–0	2–0	1–0	4–0	4–0	0–0	4–1
Coquimbo Unido	0–1	3–1	0–2	—	1–1	3–2	2–0	1–1	1–2	0–1	0–1	2–2	2–4	3–2	2–3	1–0
Curicó Unido	4–1	1–0	1–2	3–0	—	2–0	1–0	0–4	4–0	1–2	5–0	0–0	0–1	2–0	3–2	3–1
Deportes Antofagasta	2–3	0–1	0–1	2–1	0–0	—	2–2	2–2	0–0	1–0	1–0	0–3 (Note: Match awarded to Palestino by walkover since Deportes Antofagasta failed to provide a suitable stadium for the event.)	2–0	0–0	0–2	1–1
Deportes La Serena	3–2	2–3	1–1	1–1	1–3	0–1	—	1–3	0–1	3–0	1–0	0–0	1–2	2–1	0–4	1–2
Everton	0–0	3–3	1–1	2–0	1–1	3–0	4–0	—	0–1	1–1	0–0	0–0	2–1	0–1	1–1	2–1
Huachipato	2–1	1–0	1–0	0–1	2–2	1–0	2–3	1–1	—	1–3	1–2	2–1	2–5	3–4	1–0	4–0
Ñublense	1–2	3–2	1–1	2–1	3–1	1–1	3–1	2–1	2–0	—	2–2	2–0	1–2	0–0	4–0	3–2
O'Higgins	2–2	1–0	1–1	2–1	0–0	1–0	3–0	2–0	1–1	1–0	—	1–2	2–2	2–2	2–1	1–0
Palestino	3–3	3–1	0–5	5–1	2–1	1–0	5–0	1–4	5–0	1–1	1–0	—	1–0	0–0	3–2	1–2
Unión Española	2–3	2–2	2–1	1–3	1–3	2–0	0–1	1–1	1–0	1–0	0–0	1–1	—	1–1	1–2	1–1
Unión La Calera	1–0	0–2	2–1	2–0	0–0	1–1	1–1	1–1	1–0	2–2	0–0	2–2	2–1	—	4–0	2–4
Universidad Católica	0–0	1–0	1–1	2–0	1–0	1–0	0–2	0–1	1–0	2–2	2–2	0–1	2–1	3–0	—	2–1
Universidad de Chile	2–3	3–4	1–3	0–0	1–1	2–1	2–0	1–1	3–2	0–1	0–1	0–0	2–0	2–1	0–3	—

Source: ANFP, Soccerway
Legend: Blue = home team win; Yellow = draw; Red = away team win.

== Top scorers ==
Rank	Name	Club	Goals
1	(Argentina) Fernando Zampedri	Universidad Católica	18
2	(Argentina) Gastón Lezcano	Cobresal	15
2	(Argentina) Juan Martín Lucero	Colo-Colo	15
4	(Chile) Joe Abrigo	Coquimbo Unido	12
4	(Argentina) Lucas Passerini	Unión La Calera	12
6	(Chile) Alexander Aravena	Ñublense	11
6	(Panama) Cecilio Waterman	Cobresal	11
8	(Uruguay) Diego Coelho	Curicó Unido	10
8	(Peru) Gabriel Costa	Colo-Colo	10
8	(Argentina) Leandro Garate	Unión Española	10
8	(Uruguay) Cristian Palacios	Universidad de Chile	10

Source: Soccerway

== Awards ==
Award	Winner	Club
Player of the Year (Jugador Experto Easy)	(Argentina) Juan Martin Lucero	Colo-Colo
Top goalscorer	(Argentina) Fernando Zampedri	Universidad Católica
Manager of the Year	(Argentina) Gustavo Quinteros	Colo-Colo
Best U-21 Player	(Chile) Alexander Aravena	Ñublense
Best Goal	(Chile) Felipe Gutiérrez	Universidad Católica
Best Save	(Chile) Brayan Cortés	Colo-Colo
Best Referee	Roberto Tobar	

=== Team of the Season ===

Team of the Season
Goalkeeper	Defenders	Midfielders	Forwards
(Chile) Brayan Cortés (Colo-Colo)	(Chile) Gabriel Suazo (Colo-Colo) (Argentina) Emiliano Amor (Colo-Colo) (Uruguay) Maximiliano Falcón (Colo-Colo) (Argentina) Juan Pablo Gómez (Curicó Unido)	(Chile) Esteban Pavez (Colo-Colo) (Argentina) Federico Mateos (Ñublense) (Chile) Víctor Méndez (Unión Española)	(Chile) Alexander Aravena (Ñublense) (Argentina) Juan Martín Lucero (Colo-Colo) (Argentina) Pablo Solari (Colo-Colo)

== Attendances ==
No.	Club	Average
1	Colo-Colo	20,273
2	Universidad de Chile	7,222
3	Universidad Católica	6,732
4	Coquimbo Unido	5,255
5	O'Higgins	4,999
6	Everton	4,683
7	Deportes La Serena	4,681
8	Curicó Unido	5,240
9	Ñublense	5,842
10	Unión Española	2,191
11	Unión La Calera	2,327
12	Audax Italiano	1,805
13	Deportes Antofagasta	2,727
14	Huachipato	3,349
15	Palestino	1,744
16	Cobresal	1,007

== See also ==
- 2022 Primera B de Chile
- 2022 Copa Chile
- 2022 Supercopa de Chile
