= Alejandro Vásquez =

Chilean footballer (born 1984)

Personal information
- Full name: Alejandro Gonzalo Vásquez Aguilera
- Date of birth: 5 June 1984 (age 42)
- Place of birth: Santiago, Chile
- Height: 1.73 m (5 ft 8 in)
- Position: Attacking midfielder

Youth career
- Colo-Colo

Senior career*
Years	Team	Apps	(Gls)
2004–2006	Colo-Colo	11	(0)
2004	→ Universidad de Concepción (loan)	16	(2)
2005	→ Deportes La Serena (loan)	18	(0)
2006	Everton	4	(0)
2007	Deportes Antofagasta	34	(1)
2008	Deportes La Serena	16	(1)
2009	Universidad de Concepción	0	(0)
2009	O'Higgins	4	(0)
2010	Curicó Unido	25	(3)
2011–2012	Ñublense	56	(10)
2013	Cobreloa	19	(1)
2014	Audax Italiano	8	(1)
2014–2015	Ñublense	14	(0)
2015–2016	San Marcos	25	(1)
2016–2017	Iberia	7	(0)
2017–2021	Deportes Melipilla	57	(2)
2021	Lautaro de Buin	3	(0)
2022	Deportes Melipilla	1	(1)
2024	Lautaro de Buin	1	(0)
Total		319	(23)
- * Club domestic league appearances and goals

Alejandro Gonzalo Vásquez Aguilera (born 5 June 1984) is a Chilean former footballer who played as a midfielder.

== Career ==
Vásquez was trained at Colo-Colo and was part of the squad that won the 2006 Torneo Apertura.

His last clubs were Lautaro de Buin in 2021 and 2024 and Deportes Melipilla in 2022.

It was confirmed his retirement in November 2025.

== Personal life ==
In March 2010, Vásquez was arrested by cover-up.
