= Hans Martínez =

Chilean footballer (born 1987)

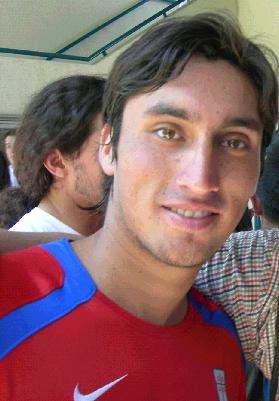
- Martínez with Universidad Católica in 2007

Personal information
- Full name: Hans Alexis Martínez Cabrera
- Date of birth: January 4, 1987 (age 39)
- Place of birth: Santiago, Chile
- Height: 1.80 m (5 ft 11 in)
- Position: Centre back

Youth career
- 1998–2007: Universidad Católica

Senior career*
Years	Team	Apps	(Gls)
2007–2014	Universidad Católica	153	(11)
2014	→ Almería (loan)	1	(0)
2014–2015	O'Higgins	27	(0)
2016–2017	Audax Italiano	9	(0)
2018–2019	Universidad de Concepción	22	(0)
2020–2021	Lautaro de Buin	12	(0)
Total		224	(11)

International career
2003	Chile U17	5	(1)
2007	Chile U20	5	(1)
2008–2010	Chile	11	(0)
Medal record
Representing Chile
Men's Football
FIFA U-20 World Cup
Third place	2007 Canada	U-20 Team
- * Club domestic league appearances and goals

Hans Alexis Martínez Cabrera (born 4 January 1987) is a Chilean former footballer who mainly played as a central defender, but he could also play as a left back or defensive midfielder.

== Club career ==
Born in Santiago, Martínez joined Universidad Católica's youth system in 1998, aged 11, and made his first-team debuts in 2007. Martínez scored his first goal on 6 October 2008, in a 5–3 away win over Universidad de Concepción. In the following three seasons he was an undisputed starter, losing his place, however, in the 2012 season.

In July 2013, Martínez rejected a new four-year deal from the UC, and after being linked to Colo-Colo and Universidad de Chile in August, he stated a desire to move abroad in December.

On 27 December 2013 Martínez joined La Liga side UD Almería on loan until the end of the season. He made his debut in the top flight of Spanish football on 12 April of the following year, starting in a 0–4 loss at Real Madrid.

On 19 July 2014, Martínez returned to Chile, joining O'Higgins.

After having contractual conflicts with Lautaro de Buin and his manager Carlos Encinas, he was given severance pay and released on April 7, 2021. A year later, he confirmed his retirement from football.

== International career ==
After appearing with the Chile under-17s at the 2003 South American Under-17 Football Championship, Martínez was a member of the Chile under-20 squad, which finished fourth at the 2007 South American Youth Championship in Paraguay, being a regular starter. He appeared at the 2007 FIFA U-20 World Cup, and the following year appeared at the Toulon Tournament.

Martínez made his full squad debut on 26 January 2008, starting in a 0–0 draw against Japan.

== Coaching career ==
Martínez has served as coach for football academies in Las Vizcachas town and Calera de Tango.

== Career statistics ==
=== Club ===
As of match played on 12 February 2021.

Appearances and goals by club, season and competition
Club	Season	League			Cup		Continental		Other		Total	
Club	Season	Division	Apps	Goals	Apps	Goals	Apps	Goals	Apps	Goals	Apps	Goals
Universidad Católica	2007	Primera División	10	0	0	0	—		—		10	0
Universidad Católica	2008	Primera División	13	1	0	0	2 (Note: Appearances in the Copa Sudamericana.)	0	1 (Note: Appearances in the Clausura Playoffs.)	0	16	1
Universidad Católica	2009	Primera División	25	0	0	0	—		9 (Note: Appearances in the Apertura playoffs and Clausura playoffs.)	1	34	1
Universidad Católica	2010	Primera División	21	1	0	0	8 (Note: Appearances in the Copa Libertadores.)	0	—		29	1
Universidad Católica	2011	Primera División	21	3	6	1	12 (Note: Appearances in the Copa Libertadores and Copa Sudamericana.)	0	9	1	48	4
Universidad Católica	2012	Primera División	14	0	5	3	11	1	1 (Note: Appearances in the Apertura playoffs.)	0	31	4
Universidad Católica	2013	Primera División	14	3	4	0	6	0	—		24	3
Universidad Católica	2013–14	Primera División	14	1	0	0	—		1	0	15	1
Universidad Católica	Total		132	9	15	4	39	1	21	2	207	16
UD Almería (loan)	2013–14	La Liga	1	0	1	0	—		—		2	0
O'Higgins	2014–15	Primera División	26	0	0	0	—		1 (Note: Appearances in the Copa Sudamericana playoffs.)	0	27	0
Audax Italiano	2016–17	Primera División	9	0	0	0	—		—		9	0
Universidad de Concepción	2018	Primera División	9	0	0	0	1	0	—		10	0
Universidad de Concepción	2019	Primera División	13	0	0	0	3	0	—		16	0
Universidad de Concepción	Total		22	0	0	0	4	0	—		26	0
Lautaro de Buin	2020	Segunda División	12	0	—		—		—		12	0
Career total			202	9	16	4	43	1	22	2	283	16

== Honours ==
Universidad Católica

- Primera División: 2010
- Copa Chile: 2011

Chile U-20

- FIFA U-20 World Cup third place: 2007
