= Eros Pérez =

Chilean footballer and journalist

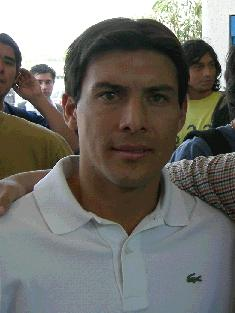
- Pérez in 2007

Personal information
- Full name: Eros Roque Pérez Salas
- Date of birth: 3 June 1976 (age 50)
- Place of birth: Santiago, Chile
- Height: 1.70 m (5 ft 7 in)
- Position: Defender

Youth career
- Palestino

Senior career*
Years	Team	Apps	(Gls)
1994–2000	Palestino	85	(3)
2000–2001	Colón	29	(1)
2001	Internacional	3	(0)
2002	Gimnasia LP	6	(0)
2002–2003	Lanús	22	(0)
2003–2004	Skoda Xanthi	17	(1)
2004–2009	Universidad Católica	132	(12)
2010	Unión San Felipe	18	(2)
2011	Ñublense	22	(0)
Total		334	(19)

International career
2001–2006	Chile	6	(0)

Managerial career
- 2016: Colegio Emaus
- 2020: Lautaro de Buin U20
- 2020–2021: Deportes Melipilla (youth)
- 2021: Deportes Melipilla (caretaker)
- 2022: Deportes Melipilla
- * Club domestic league appearances and goals

Eros Roque Pérez Salas (born 3 June 1976) is a Chilean former footballer, manager and journalist.

== Club career ==
Pérez started playing football at Palestino lower divisions, where was promoted to first-adult team in 1994. After completing three goals in 85 appearances playing for the club until mid-2000, the incoming year he moved to Argentina’s Colón de Santa Fe to face the 2000–01 Argentine football season.

Once finished that season, he left Colón and joined Brazilian giants Internacional de Porto Alegre. However, after only playing three league games and didn’t play during the national cup due to an injury, he returned to Argentina, joining Gimnasia La Plata, where he also failed to have continuity, playing only six league games.

For the 2002–03 season, Pérez signed for Lanús, making 22 appearances. Nevertheless the next season, he moved to Skoda Xanthi from Greece. There he played 17 games and scored one time.

In mid-2004, he returned his homeland, joining Chilean powerhouse Universidad Católica. At Católica, Pérez became an unmovable player and team’s captain, he helped the club to win the 2005 Torneo Clausura and to reach that season’s Copa Sudamericana semifinals. He completed a total of twelve goals in 132 appearances during his period between 2004 and 2009 and was one of the referents during that seasons alongside players like Jorge Ormeño or the keeper José María Buljubasich.

After finishing his contract with Universidad Católica, on 18 December 2009, it was reported that Pérez joined Unión San Felipe, freshly promoted to top-level in the age. His first goal came in his debut against Colo-Colo in a 3–2, where scored a 30-meter goal.

In 2011, he signed for Ñublense, being presented in a friendly match against Audax Italiano where both team draw 2–2. At the end of the season he announced his retirement from football.

== Coaching career ==
Pérez coached the football team of Colegio Emaus.

In 2020, Pérez worked as the coach of the Lautaro de Buin under-20 team. Next, he moved to Deportes Melipilla as the head coach of the youth ranks. In 2021, he coached Deportes Melipilla as a caretaker during the promotion playoff to Primera División due to the head coach, John Armijo, tested positive by COVID-19.

Pérez founded the academy "Eros Pérez: Camino Al Éxito" (Eros Pérez: Road to Glory) which provides tools to potential professional footballers.

== Other works ==
From 2012 to 2019, Pérez performed as a football commentator and analyst for the Chilean TV channel Canal del Fútbol.

== Honours ==
=== Club ===
Universidad Católica

- Primera División de Chile: 2005 Clausura
