= Estadio Soinca Bata =

Stadium in Melipilla, Chile

- Interactive map of Estadio Soinca Bata
- Full name: Estadio Municipal Soinca
- Location: Melipilla, Santiago Metropolitan Region, Chile
- Coordinates: 33°40′53.59″S 71°11′14″W

Tenant
- Deportes Melipilla

The Estadio Soinca Bata is a sports venue located in the city of Melipilla, Santiago Metropolitan Region, Chile. With a capacity of about 1,000 spectators, it was formerly the stadium of the club Soinca Bata, and since 2023 it has hosted the home matches of Deportes Melipilla.

The stadium belonged to Club Deportivo Soinca Bata, the team representing the Sociedad Industrial de Calzado, which manufactured Bata shoes. The club turned professional in 1975, and in 1991 withdrew from professional football due to the withdrawal of support from the Bata company. The club ceded its federative rights to the newly created Deportes Melipilla, which played its home games at the stadium until August 1992, when it moved to the Estadio Municipal Roberto Bravo Santibáñez.

In 2019, the remodeling works of the Roberto Bravo Santibáñez Municipal Stadium began, but a series of irregularities led to a delay in the delivery of the reconstruction, so Deportes Melipilla had to move to the Soinca Bata Stadium.
