= Rodrigo Cisterna (footballer) =

Chilean footballer

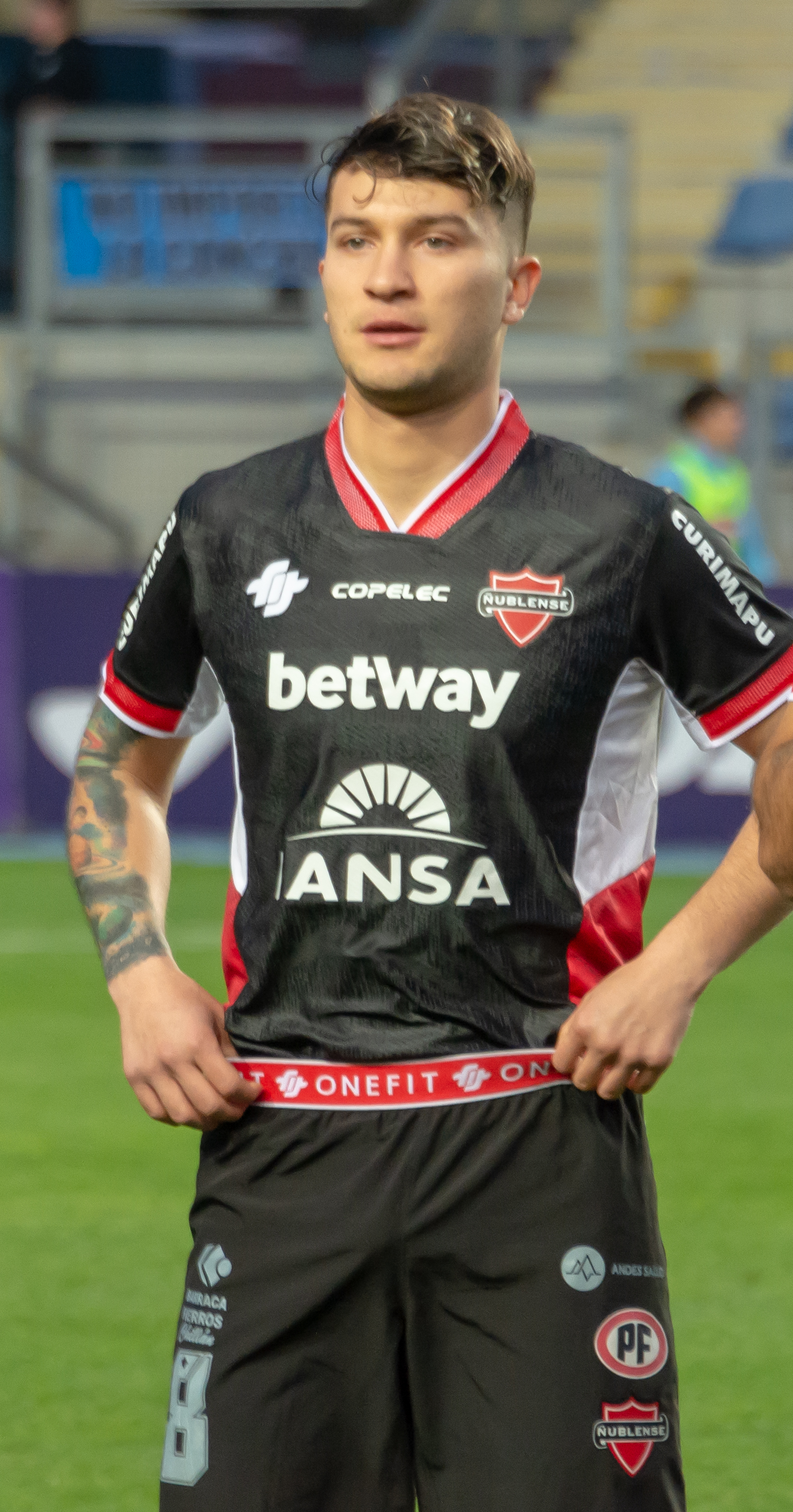
- Cisterna with Ñublense in 2023.

Personal information
- Full name: Rodrigo Antonio Cisterna Arancibia
- Date of birth: 25 March 2002 (age 24)
- Place of birth: Santiago, Chile
- Height: 1.73 m (5 ft 8 in)
- Position: Attacking midfielder

Team information
- Current team: Lautaro de Buin
- Number: 11

Youth career
- 2009–2011: Colo-Colo La Florida
- 2011–2021: Colo-Colo

Senior career*
Years	Team	Apps	(Gls)
2021–2022	Colo-Colo	0	(0)
2022	→ Ñublense (loan)	12	(0)
2023–2024	Ñublense	21	(0)
2024	→ Deportes Santa Cruz (loan)	12	(1)
2025–	Lautaro de Buin		

International career
2017	Chile U15		
2017	Chile U17		
- * Club domestic league appearances and goals as of 6 September 2025

Rodrigo Antonio Cisterna Arancibia (born 25 March 2002) is a Chilean footballer who plays as an attacking midfielder for Lautaro de Buin.

== Club career ==
Born in Santiago de Chile, Cisterna is a product of Colo-Colo and took part in the 2020 U-20 Copa Libertadores. In 2022, he was loaned out to Ñublense in the Chilean Primera División and made his senior debut scoring a goal in the friendly match against the Uruguayan club Nacional on 17 January.

In the 2023 season, he continued with Ñublense and took part in both the 2023 Copa Libertadores and the 2023 Copa Sudamericana. In June 2024, he was loaned out to Deportes Santa Cruz.

Ended his contract with Ñublense, Cisterna joined Lautaro de Buin for the 2025 season.

== International career ==
Cisterna represented Chile at under-15 level in the 2017 South American Championship and the under 17's at the Four Nations Tournament in Mexico in the same year.

== Personal life ==
=== Controversies ===
On 29 October 2023, Cisterna was arrested under the Chilean arms control law for carrying a 9 mm cartridge into the Diego Aracena International Airport after a friendly match between Ñublense and Deportes Iquique.
