= René Meléndez =

René Meléndez may refer to:

- René Meléndez (footballer, born 1928)
- René Meléndez (footballer, born 1998)
