= Martín Arenas =

Chilean footballer (born 1997)

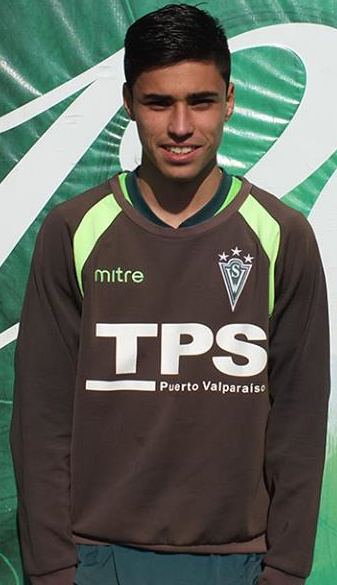

Personal information
- Full name: Martín Nicolás Arenas Jara
- Date of birth: 23 January 1997 (age 29)
- Place of birth: Valparaíso, Chile
- Height: 1.72 m (5 ft 8 in)
- Position: Winger

Youth career
- Águilas Verdes
- Unión Salles
- Santiago Wanderers
- 2015–2017: Villarreal

Senior career*
Years	Team	Apps	(Gls)
2014	Santiago Wanderers		
2016–2017	Villarreal C	21	(5)
2017–2018	Universidad de Chile		
2018	→ Magallanes (loan)	23	(1)
2019–2021	Magallanes	39	(1)
2022–2023	Deportes Melipilla	4	(0)
2022	→ Lautaro de Buin (loan)	3	(0)

International career
2011	Chile U15		
2015	Chile U20		
- * Club domestic league appearances and goals as of 8 February 2024

Martín Nicolás Arenas Jara (born 23 January 1997) is a Chilean footballer who plays as a winger.

== Club career ==
As a youth player, Arenas was with Águilas Verdes, Unión Salles and Santiago Wanderers in his city of birth, Valparaíso. A member of the Santiago Wanderers first team in 2014, he moved to Spain and signed with Villarreal in January 2015, playing first for the Juvenil A team, with whom he won the Group VII of the División de Honor, and also training with the first team. He after made twenty one appearances and scored five goals for Villarreal C in the 2016–17 Tercera División.

In the second half of 2017, he returned to Chile and joined Universidad de Chile on a deal for eighteen months. The next year, he joined Magallanes and played for them until the 2021 season.

In 2022, he signed with Deportes Melipilla and was loaned out to Lautaro de Buin in the second half of the year.

== International career ==
Arenas represented Chile at under-15 level in the 2011 South American Championship.

At under-20 level, he represented Chile in the 2015 L'Alcúdia Tournament under Nicolás Córdova, where they became champions. He was called up to the squad for the 2017 South American Championship under Héctor Robles, but he suffered a muscle strain.

== Honours ==
Villarreal Juvenil A

- División de Honor Juvenil - Group VII (2): 2014–15, 2015–16

Chile U20

- L'Alcúdia International Tournament: 2015

== Personal life ==
At the beginning of his career, he was nicknamed Niño Maravilla (Wonder Boy) like Alexis Sánchez.
