= Cristian Toro (footballer) =

Chilean footballer

Personal information
- Full name: Cristian Alejandro Toro Castañeda
- Date of birth: 10 November 2000 (age 26)
- Place of birth: Santiago, Chile
- Height: 1.86 m (6 ft 1 in)
- Position: Centre-back

Team information
- Current team: Huachipato

Youth career
- Maipo Quilicura
- 2016–2019: Deportes Melipilla

Senior career*
Years	Team	Apps	(Gls)
2019–2022	Deportes Melipilla	37	(2)
2023–2025	Cobresal	36	(1)
2026–	Huachipato	0	(0)
- * Club domestic league appearances and goals as of 20 December 2025

Cristian Alejandro Toro Castañeda (born 10 November 2000) is a Chilean footballer who plays as a centre-back for Huachipato.

== Club career ==
Born in Santiago de Chile, Toro was with Maipo Quilicura and trialed with Universidad Católica before joining Deportes Melipilla in 2016. He made his senior debut in the 2019 Primera B and the next year he was promoted to the first team and signed his first professional contract. With them, he got promotion and took part in the 2021 Primera División.

In January 2023, Toro signed with Cobresal. With them, he became the 2023 Chilean Primera División runners-up and took part in the 2024 Copa Libertadores.

On 22 December 2025, Toro signed with Huachipato.

== Personal life ==
Before signing his first professional contract with Deportes Melipilla, Toro studied IT management at Diego Portales University.
