= Cristopher Penroz =

Chilean footballer (born 1990)

Personal information
- Full name: Cristopher Jesús Penroz Patiño
- Date of birth: 2 May 1990 (age 36)
- Place of birth: Puente Alto, Santiago, Chile
- Height: 1.80 m (5 ft 11 in)
- Position: Defender

Team information
- Current team: Real San Joaquín
- Number: 20

Youth career
- Colo-Colo

Senior career*
Years	Team	Apps	(Gls)
2009–2013	Colo-Colo	1	(0)
2010	→ Magallanes (loan)	24	(0)
2012	→ Magallanes (loan)	25	(1)
2013	Colo-Colo B	24	(3)
2014–2017	Deportes Pintana	97	(12)
2018–2019	Deportes Santa Cruz	34	(1)
2020	General Velásquez	21	(3)
2021	Lautaro de Buin	14	(2)
2022	Deportes Melipilla	9	(0)
2023	Lautaro de Buin	21	(2)
2024–	Real San Joaquín	1	(0)
- * Club domestic league appearances and goals as of 11 March 2024

Cristopher Jesús Penroz Patiño (born 2 May 1990) is a Chilean footballer who currently plays for Real San Joaquín as a defender.

== Honours ==
Colo-Colo

- Primera División (1): 2009 Clausura

Magallanes

- Tercera A (1): 2010

Deportes Santa Cruz

- Segunda División (1): 2018
