= Miguel Sanhueza =

Chilean footballer (born 1991)

- Sanhueza with Cobreloa in 2011

Personal information
- Full name: Miguel Alejandro Sanhueza Mora
- Date of birth: 30 August 1991 (age 35)
- Place of birth: Temuco, Chile
- Height: 1.79 m (5 ft 10 in)
- Position: Defender

Team information
- Current team: Deportes Temuco

Youth career
- Cobreloa

Senior career*
| Years | Team | Apps | (Gls) |
| 2009–2016 | Cobreloa | 86 | (2) |
| 2016–2017 | Deportes Melipilla | 26 | (1) |
| 2017–2018 | Cobreloa | 35 | (2) |
| 2019–2021 | Deportes Melipilla | 76 | (0) |
| 2022 | Santiago Wanderers | 30 | (0) |
| 2023 | Coquimbo Unido | 0 | (0) |
| 2023 | → Deportes Iquique (loan) | 30 | (2) |
| 2024 | Deportes Iquique | 17 | (1) |
| 2025 | Rangers | 30 | (1) |
| 2026– | Deportes Temuco | 0 | (0) |
- * Club domestic league appearances and goals as of 10 December 2025

Miguel Alejandro Sanhueza Mora (born 30 August 1991) is a Chilean footballer currently playing for Deportes Temuco.

== Career ==
For the 2023 season, Sanhueza signed with Coquimbo Unido in the Chilean Primera División, being loaned to Deportes Iquique. He renewed with Deportes Iquique for the 2024 season. The next year, he switched to Rangers de Talca.

In December 2025, Sanhueza signed with Deportes Temuco.

== Personal life ==
He is the older brother of also footballer Eryin Sanhueza.
