= Eryin Sanhueza =

Chilean footballer (born 1996)

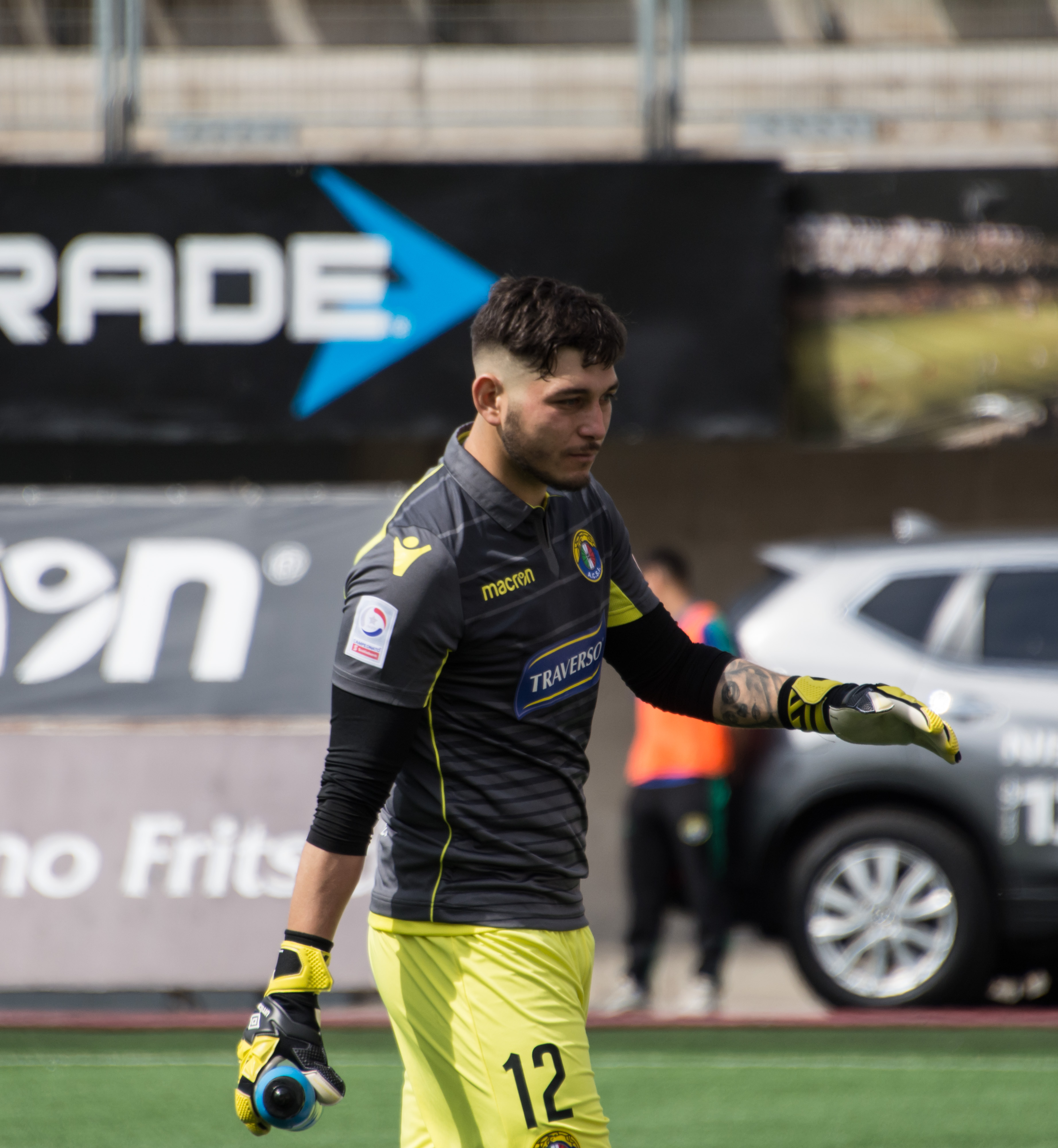
- Sanhueza with Audax Italiano in 2018

Personal information
- Full name: Eryin Alexis Sanhueza Mora
- Date of birth: 29 April 1996 (age 30)
- Place of birth: Temuco, Chile
- Height: 1.79 m (5 ft 10 in)
- Position: Goalkeeper

Team information
- Current team: Deportes La Serena
- Number: 1

Youth career
- Audax Italiano

Senior career*
Years	Team	Apps	(Gls)
2013	Audax Italiano B	1	(0)
2015–2020	Audax Italiano	11	(0)
2018	→ Colchagua (loan)	5	(0)
2020	→ Lautaro de Buin (loan)	15	(0)
2021	Lautaro de Buin	22	(0)
2022	Deportes Melipilla	32	(0)
2023–	Deportes La Serena	3	(0)

International career
2013	Chile U17		
2015	Chile U20		
- * Club domestic league appearances and goals as of 4 July 2023

Eryin Alexis Sanhueza Mora (born 29 April 1996) is a Chilean footballer who plays for Deportes La Serena as a goalkeeper.

== International career ==
Along with Chile U20, he won the L'Alcúdia Tournament in 2015.

== Personal life ==
He is the younger brother of the also footballer Miguel Sanhueza.

== Honours ==
Chile U20

- L'Alcúdia International Tournament (1): 2015
