= Francisco Lara (footballer) =

Chilean footballer (born 1995)

Personal information
- Full name: Francisco Antonio Lara Uribe
- Date of birth: 25 January 1995 (age 31)
- Place of birth: Linares, Chile
- Height: 1.69 m (5 ft 6 1/2 in)
- Position: Midfielder

Team information
- Current team: Lautaro de Buin

Youth career
- Colo-Colo

Senior career*
Years	Team	Apps	(Gls)
2012–2015	Colo-Colo B	34	(11)
2012–2015	Colo-Colo	4	(0)
2013–2014	→ Villarreal C (loan)	–	(–)
2015–2017	Deportes Santa Cruz	63	(28)
2018	Colchagua	23	(2)
2019	Santiago Morning	6	(0)
2020–2021	Lautaro de Buin	43	(7)
2022	Deportes Melipilla	10	(0)
2023	Deportes Concepción	10	(1)
2024–	Lautaro de Buin	0	(0)
- * Club domestic league appearances and goals as of 13 February 2024

Francisco Antonio Lara Uribe (born 25 January 1995) is a Chilean footballer who currently plays for Lautaro de Buin as a midfielder.
