= Diego Alvarado =

Chilean footballer (born 1991)

Personal information
- Full name: Diego Jesús Alvarado Rodríguez
- Date of birth: 20 November 1991 (age 34)
- Place of birth: La Florida, Santiago, Chile
- Height: 1.79 m (5 ft 10 in)
- Position: Striker

Youth career
- 2008: Grêmio
- 2009–2010: Unión San Felipe

Senior career*
| Years | Team | Apps | (Gls) |
| 2010–2014 | Unión San Felipe | 39 | (7) |
| 2010 | → Trasandino (loan) | – | (–) |
| 2011–2012 | → Deportes Temuco (loan) | 15 | (0) |
| 2014–2015 | Coquimbo Unido | 27 | (4) |
| 2015–2016 | Deportes Puerto Montt | 23 | (2) |
| 2016–2017 | Magallanes | 23 | (9) |
| 2017–2018 | Curicó Unido | 8 | (1) |
| 2018 | → Cobreloa (loan) | 8 | (2) |
| 2019–2020 | San Luis | 18 | (3) |
| 2020 | Aragua | 4 | (0) |
| 2020–2021 | Santiago Morning | 8 | (1) |
| 2021 | San Antonio Unido | 9 | (2) |
| 2021–2022 | Deportes Melipilla | 25 | (6) |
| Total | | 182 | (31) |

International career
| 2010 | Chile U20 | | |
- * Club domestic league appearances and goals

Diego Jesús Alvarado Rodríguez (born 20 November 1991) is a Chilean former professional footballer who played as a striker.

== Club career ==
A product of Unión San Felipe youth system, Alvarado also had a stint with Brazilian club Grêmio as a youth player. At professional level, he has played for several clubs in Chilean football. In the Chilean Primera División, he has played for Unión San Felipe, Curicó Unido and Deportes Melipilla.

Abroad, he played for Venezuelan club Aragua in 2020. Then, he returned to Chile to join Santiago Morning.

He retired at the end of the 2022 season.

== International career ==
Alvarado represented Chile at under-20 level in friendly matches against Uruguay U20 played in 2010, alongside players such as Enzo Roco and César Pinares.

== Personal life ==
His father, Arturo, was a professional footballer who played for Trasandino in the 1980s.
