= Estadio Lautaro =

Stadium in Buin, Santiago, Chile

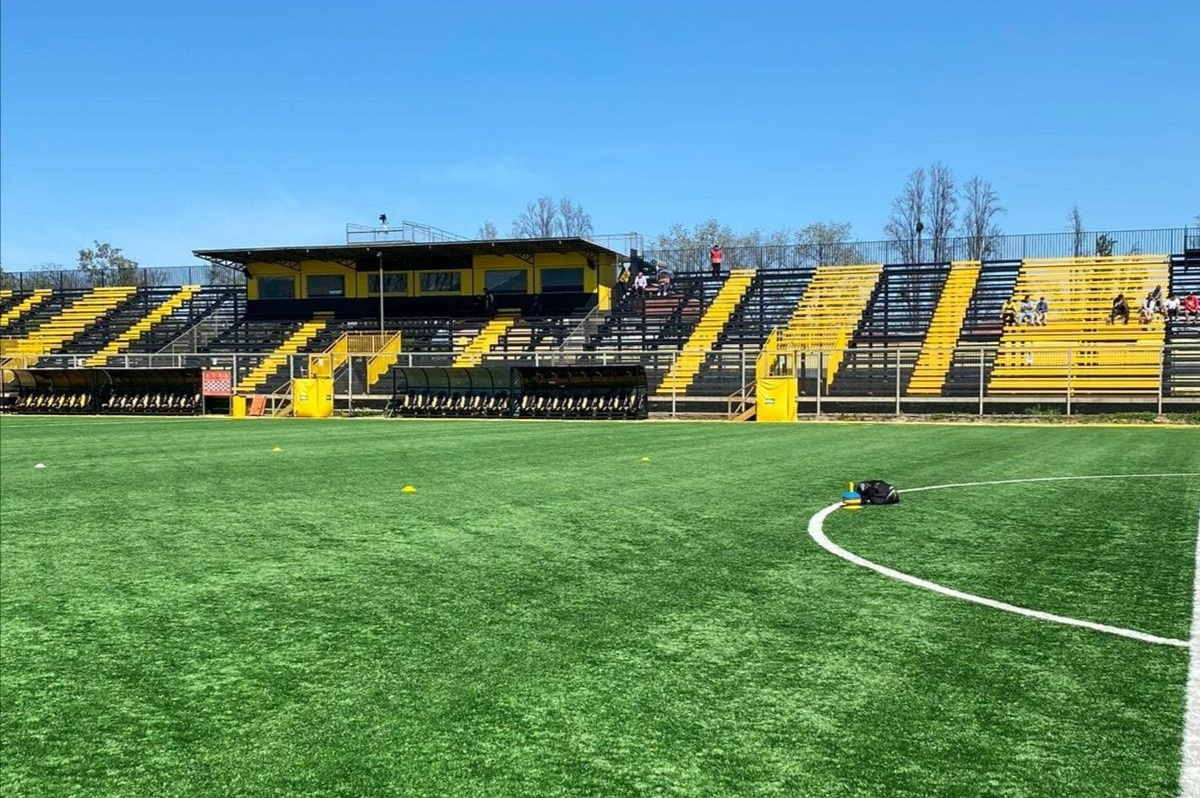
- Stadium in 2023.
- Interactive map of Estadio Lautaro
- Location: Buin
- Coordinates: 33°44′14″S 70°44′16″W
- Owner: Lautaro de Buin
- Capacity: 3,700
- Surface: grass
- Field size: 105 x 68m

Construction
- Opened: 1967
- Renovated: 2020

Tenant
- Lautaro de Buin

Estadio Lautaro is a stadium in Buin, Santiago Metropolitan Region. It is currently used mostly for football matches and is the home stadium of Lautaro de Buin.

The stadium holds 3,700 people.
