= René Meléndez (footballer, born 1998) =

Chilean footballer

Personal information
- Full name: René Antonio Meléndez Plaza
- Date of birth: 19 November 1998 (age 27)
- Place of birth: San Antonio, Chile
- Height: 1.78 m (5 ft 10 in)
- Position: Midfielder

Team information
- Current team: Deportes Linares

Youth career
- Audax Italiano

Senior career*
Years	Team	Apps	(Gls)
2015–2021	Audax Italiano	32	(2)
2019	→ Deportes Melipilla (loan)	6	(1)
2021	→ Lautaro de Buin (loan)	11	(7)
2022–2023	Lautaro de Buin	46	(12)
2024	Deportes La Serena	11	(0)
2025	San Antonio Unido	23	(3)
2026–	Deportes Linares	0	(0)

International career^{‡}
2014–2015	Chile U17	11	(1)
- * Club domestic league appearances and goals as of 20 April 2026 ‡ National team caps and goals as of 18 July 2022

René Antonio Meléndez Plaza (born 19 November 1998) is a Chilean footballer who plays as a midfielder for Deportes Linares.

== Club career ==
In 2024, Meléndez joined Deportes La Serena in the second level from Lautaro de Buin.

In April 2026, Meléndez joined Deportes Linares from San Antonio Unido.

== International career ==
Meléndez represented Chile at under-17 level in the 2014 South American Games, the 2015 South American Championship in Paraguay and the 2015 FIFA World Cup in Chile.
