= Matías Rosas =

Chilean footballer (born 1998)

Personal information
- Full name: Matías Waldemar Rosas Calisto
- Date of birth: 1 February 1998 (age 28)
- Place of birth: Ancud, Chile
- Height: 1.69 m (5 ft 7 in)
- Position: Forward

Team information
- Current team: Lautaro de Buin
- Number: 7

Youth career
- 2014–2018: Universidad Católica

Senior career*
Years	Team	Apps	(Gls)
2018–2020	Universidad Católica	0	(0)
2018–2019	→ Deportes Puerto Montt (loan)	31	(2)
2020	Deportes Copiapó	1	(0)
2020–	Lautaro de Buin	26	(1)

International career
2014	Chile U17	2	(0)
- * Club domestic league appearances and goals as of 16 May 2022

Matías Waldemar Rosas Calisto (born 1 February 1998) is a Chilean professional footballer who plays as a forward for Chilean club Lautaro de Buin.

== International career ==
Rosas represented Chile U17 at the 2014 South American Games.
