= Rodrigo Canosa =

Uruguayan footballer (born 1988)

Personal information
- Full name: Rodrigo Canosa Martínez
- Date of birth: September 18, 1988 (age 38)
- Place of birth: San Jacinto, Uruguay
- Height: 1.88 m (6 ft 2 in)
- Position: Defender

Team information
- Current team: Lautaro de Buin
- Number: 13

Youth career
- El Tanque Sisley

Senior career*
Years	Team	Apps	(Gls)
2008–2009	El Tanque Sisley		
2009–2011	Cerrito (Note: Excludes 2010–11 Segunda División)	32	(2)
2012–2013	Rampla Juniors (Note: Excludes 2013 Clausura)	27	(2)
2012	→ Olimpo (loan)	0	(0)
2014	Villa Teresa	16	(1)
2015	Cerro	27	(1)
2015	América de Cali (Note: Soccerway's figure of 15 includes 3 promotion phase appearances)	12	(1)
2016	Delfín	7	(1)
2016–2017	Cerro	30	(2)
2017	Curicó Unido	6	(0)
2018–2019	Santiago Morning	54	(3)
2020–	Lautaro de Buin	21	(0)
- * Club domestic league appearances and goals as of 5 May 2021

Rodrigo Canosa Martínez (born September 18, 1988) is a Uruguayan professional footballer who plays as a central defender for Segunda División Profesional de Chile side Lautaro de Buin. He previously played domestically for El Tanque Sisley, Cerrito, Rampla Juniors, Villa Teresa and Cerro, in Argentina for Olimpo de Bahía Blanca, for América de Cali of Colombia, for Ecuadorian club Delfín, and for Curicó Unido of Chile.

== Life and career ==
Canosa was born in San Jacinto, in the Canelones Department. He played football for Montevideo-based club El Tanque Sisley, and by the end of the 2008 Apertura, had made his Segunda División debut. He moved on to Cerrito, newly promoted to the Primera División for the 2009–10 season. He established himself in the team in his first season, at the end of which Cerrito were relegated, helped them make an immediate return as 2010–11 runners-up, and was ever-present until the end of the 2011 Apertura.

He signed for Primera club Rampla Juniors ahead of the 2012 Clausura, at the end of which a 7–1 defeat at home to Peñarol confirmed their relegation. Canosa left for Argentina, to join Olimpo de Bahía Blanca on loan for the season. However, he could not force his way into an already well-populated defence, the loan was cancelled, and Canosa returned to Rampla Juniors for the 2013 Clausura. He continued to play for Rampla Juniors for the rest of 2013, before finishing the season with another Segunda División club, Villa Teresa.

In August 2014, Canosa returned to the Primera with Cerro. He was a regular starter as Cerro struggled in the first half of the season but improved in the second to avoid relegation.

He signed for América de Cali of the Colombian Primera B in June 2015. He said he was keen to bring his good aerial play, ability to organise a defence, and leadership qualities to a team anxious for promotion. He was a regular starter, helping América qualify for the promotion phase, but they came second in their group so failed to reach the final, and Canosa was released. His next port of call was Manta, in Ecuador, where he joined Serie A club Delfín. He had played seven league matches when a major earthquake struck the area in April 2016. More than 200 residents of the city were killed and thousands made homeless. The frightening experience he went through, and concern for his wife and young baby as aftershocks continued, caused him to request and the club to grant the immediate cancellation of his contract so that he could return home.

When the transfer window opened, Canosa rejoined Cerro. He remained with the club until the end of the 2017 Apertura and played once in the Torneo Intermedio before moving abroad again, this time to Curicó Unido of the Chilean Primera División. He was not a regular in the team, and in January 2018 signed for Primera B club Santiago Morning.
