= Ricardo Queraltó =

Chilean footballer and manager (born 1976)

Personal information
- Full name: Ricardo Antonio Queraltó Alvarado
- Date of birth: 12 January 1976 (age 50)
- Place of birth: Santiago, Chile
- Height: 1.76 m (5 ft 9 in)
- Position: Forward

Youth career
- Unión Española

Senior career*
Years	Team	Apps	(Gls)
1994–2001	Unión Española	99	(34)
1996	→ Deportes Linares (loan)		
2001	AC Arezzo		
2002	Colo-Colo	1	(0)
2002–2004	Santiago Morning		
2004	Mitra Kukar		
2005	Deportes Melipilla	22	(0)

International career
2000	Chile	2	(1)

Managerial career
- Palestino (youth)
- Unión Española (youth)
- * Club domestic league appearances and goals

Ricardo Antonio Queraltó Alvarado (born 12 January 1976) is a Chilean former professional footballer who played as a forward.

== Club career ==
A product of Unión Española youth system, Queraltó played for Unión Española, Deportes Linares, Colo-Colo, Santiago Morning and Deportes Melipilla.

Along with Unión Española, he won the 1999 Primera B de Chile and got promotion to the top division, after the club had been relegated in 1998. In the championship, he scored 21 goals.

He also had a stint with Italian club AC Arezzo in 2001. Previously, he had gone to China along with Gabriel Mendoza and the agent of Unión Española, Francisco Ugarte, to sign with Shandong Luneng, but just Mendoza joined the club and Queraltó returned to Chile after three months. In 2004, he also was with Mitra Kukar in 2004, where he coincided with Rodrigo Cuevas as fellow and Hernán Godoy as coach.

== International career ==
Queraltó made two appearances for the Chile national team in 2000, scoring a goal against Guatemala on 5 February.

== Coaching career ==
As a football coach, he has worked in the youth ranks of both Palestino and Unión Española.

== Honours ==
Unión Española

- Primera B de Chile: 1999
