= Pablo Vergara =

Argentine-born Chilean footballer (born 1988)

Personal information
- Full name: Pablo Nicolás Vergara
- Date of birth: September 15, 1988 (age 38)
- Place of birth: Neuquén, Argentina
- Height: 1.74 m (5 ft 9 in)
- Positions: Left back; left winger

Team information
- Current team: Lautaro de Buin
- Number: 11

Senior career*
Years	Team	Apps	(Gls)
2008–2010	Banfield	21	(0)
2010–2011	Chacarita Juniors	9	(0)
2011–2012	San Martín (T)	10	(2)
2012–2013	Guillermo Brown	25	(3)
2013–2014	Unión La Calera	32	(1)
2014–2017	Boca Unidos	56	(2)
2017–2018	Almagro	27	(2)
2018–2019	Cipolletti	30	(7)
2020	Unión San Felipe	25	(0)
2021	Cobreloa	6	(0)
2021	Santiago Morning	7	(1)
2022–	Lautaro de Buin	2	(0)
- * Club domestic league appearances and goals as of 17 july 2022

Pablo Nicolás Vergara (born 15 September 1988 in Neuquén) is an Argentine-Chilean football left back or left winger who plays for Lautaro de Buin in the Segunda División Profesional de Chile.

== Career ==
=== Club career ===
Vergara made his professional debut for Banfield on 12 April 2008 in a 0–0 draw against Gimnasia y Esgrima de La Plata. In 2009, he was part of the squad that won the Argentine championship for the first time in the history of the club, clinching the Apertura 2009 championship on the final day of the season.

For the 2010–11 season, Vergara was loaned to Chacarita Juniors in the Argentine second division.

On second half 2021, he signed with Santiago Morning.

== Honours ==
Banfield

- Primera División Argentina: Apertura 2009
