= Nicolás Gutiérrez (footballer) =

Chilean footballer (born 2000)

Personal information
- Full name: Nicolás Enrique Alberto Gutiérrez Contreras
- Date of birth: 28 January 2000 (age 26)
- Place of birth: Chile
- Positions: Midfielder; forward

Youth career
- Palestino

Senior career*
Years	Team	Apps	(Gls)
2018–2022	Palestino	2	(0)
2020–2021	→ Lautaro de Buin (loan)	29	(5)
2022–2024	Lautaro de Buin	54	(10)
2025	Santiago City	3	(0)

International career^{‡}
2015	Chile U15		
2017	Chile U17	4	(0)
- * Club domestic league appearances and goals as of 24 March 2026 ‡ National team caps and goals as of 20 March 2017

Nicolás Enrique Alberto Gutiérrez Contreras (born 28 January 2000) is a Chilean footballer who plays as a forward.

== International career ==
At early age, Gutiérrez represented Chile at under-15 level at the 2015 South American U-15 Championship and Chile U17 at the 2017 South American U-17 Championship.

== Honours ==
Palestino

- Copa Chile: 2018
