= Gabriel Mendoza =

Chilean footballer (born 1968)

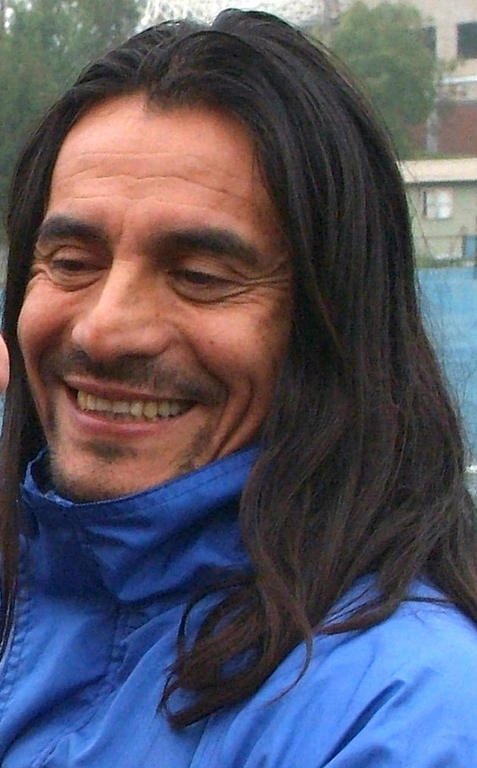

Personal information
- Full name: Gabriel Rafael Mendoza Ibarra
- Date of birth: 22 May 1968 (age 58)
- Place of birth: Graneros, Chile
- Height: 1.73 m (5 ft 8 in)
- Position: Right-back

Senior career*
Years	Team	Apps	(Gls)
1986–1990	O'Higgins	78	(4)
1991–1996	Colo-Colo	163	(6)
1997	São Paulo	17	(0)
1998–1999	Tigres UANL	19	(1)
2000	Santiago Wanderers	25	(0)
2001	Colo-Colo	13	(1)
2001	Shandong Luneng	6	(0)
2002	Santiago Morning	17	(0)

International career
1991–1997	Chile	36	(1)
- * Club domestic league appearances and goals

Gabriel Rafael Mendoza Ibarra (born 22 May 1968), commonly known as Coca Mendoza, is a Chilean former professional footballer who played as a right-back and central midfielder. Mendoza was member of Colo-Colo's historic squad that achieved 1991 Copa Libertadores.

== Playing career ==
Mendoza was born in Graneros. He arrived to Colo-Colo, after of made a recognized season with O'Higgins. In the Cacique, he immediately was won the position of right back in the squad of the coach Mirko Jozic, European style assiduously defensive, but with very vertigo in the sidebands.

He was one of key players of the club in the squad that Colo-Colo achieved the Copa Libertadores 1991, after of defeat to Olimpia for 3–0 in the final, however he also was included in the best team of South America. Mendoza also won the Chilean Primera Division with the club in the same year. In the match against Puebla for Recopa Sudamericana of 1992, he scored one of three goals of Colo-Colo, in the 3–1 victory. After of four good seasons, he was signed by Tigres UANL of Mexico.

After of made an irregular season with Tigres, he return to Chile, for play at Santiago Wanderers in 2000. One year later, he returned to Colo-Colo. After of his spent for Colo-Colo, he joined to Shandong Luneng of Chinese Super League. He had gone to China along with Ricardo Queraltó, but he just could sign with the club. Finally in 2002, he return to Chile for finish his career at Santiago Morning.

== Post-playing career ==
In 2005, Gabriel Mendoza participated in the reality show La Granja VIP. During the reality, he was the runner-up of the contest, after of loss in a mourning of force at final against the Spanish singer Javier Estrada. After of his participation in this reality, he was invited to many stellars of the Chilean TV. In 2009, Mendoza once appeared in a TV series, the reality show 1810 of Canal 13. He had his personal revenge, because he won the final of the reality, winning a reward of 50 million pesos (US$80.000).

Currently Mendoza plays in the Chile national team of Showbol, tournament of futsal played for all South America. He also has a football school in Viña del Mar, called Gabriel "Coca" Mendoza.

In the 2016 Chilean municipal elections, Mendoza was elected as a councilman for Viña del Mar with the Independent Democratic Union, winning 5,314 votes, the most in that city's election.

In the 2021 Chilean municipal elections, Mendoza was a candidate to Alcalde for Graneros commune.

== Personal life ==
Mendoza is better known by his nickname Coca for his similarity with the Chilean television actress Coca Guazzini.

Mendoza is the cousin of the former footballer Manuel Ibarra.

Mendoza is the godfather of the footballer from the Santiago Wanderers youth ranks, Matías Santelices, a son of the former footballer for the same club, Álex Santelices.
