= John Armijo =

Chilean football manager

Personal information
- Full name: John Sebastián Armijo Armijo
- Date of birth: 8 November 1981 (age 44)
- Place of birth: Cerrillos, Chile

Team information
- Current team: Unión La Calera (manager)

Managerial career
- Years: Team
- 2016–2019: O'Higgins (youth)
- 2017–2022: Colegio Marista
- 2017: O'Higgins (interim)
- 2018–2019: O'Higgins (assistant)
- 2020–2021: Deportes Melipilla
- 2021–2022: Barnechea
- 2023–2024: Deportes Antofagasta
- 2025–2026: Deportes Santa Cruz
- 2026–: Unión La Calera

John Sebastián Armijo Armijo (born 8 November 1981) is a Chilean football manager. He is the current manager of Unión La Calera.

== Career ==
Born in Cerrillos, Santiago, Armijo started his career as a fitness coach and joined Marcelo Bielsa's staff in the Chile national team, in 2007 as an assistant to fitness coach Luis María Bonini. He left the staff in 2010 after the 2010 FIFA World Cup, and subsequently worked as a fitness coach at Universidad Católica, O'Higgins, Santiago Wanderers, Cobreloa and Unión Española.

Armijo returned to O'Higgins in 2016 after acquiring his coaching license, and was named manager of the club's youth categories. On 1 August 2017, he was named interim manager after the resignation of Cristián Arán, He stayed in the role for two matches, and subsequently became an assistant of newly appointed Gabriel Milito.

After leaving O'Higgins in 2019, Armijo subsequently worked as a head of youth development at Barnechea before being named manager of Primera B side Deportes Melipilla on 16 December 2020. He led the club to the promotion play-offs, where his side achieved promotion after defeating Unión San Felipe on penalties.

In 2023, Armijo assumed as manager of Deportes Antofagasta. He was sacked in June 2024 for ambiguous reasons. After a brief stint as sport manager of Bolivian club GV San José, he was appointed manager of Deportes Santa Cruz. He was released in April 2026.

== Other works ==
At the same time that he worked as manager of Barnechea, he performed as a football commentator and tactical analyst for both the digital media Redgol and the TV channel Vive from VTR.
