= Emiliano Astorga =

Chilean footballer and manager (born 1960)

Personal information
- Full name: Emiliano Eduardo Astorga Lobos
- Date of birth: 21 September 1960 (age 66)
- Place of birth: San Antonio, Chile
- Height: 1.81 m (5 ft 11 1/2 in)
- Position: Defender

Team information
- Current team: Deportes Temuco (manager)

Senior career*
Years	Team	Apps	(Gls)
1978–1982	San Antonio Unido		
1983–1986	Magallanes		
1985	→ Unión La Calera (loan)		
1987	Rangers		
1988	Naval		
1989–1995	Deportes Melipilla		
1996	Santiago Morning		

Managerial career
- 2003: San Antonio Unido
- 2009: Deportes Melipilla
- 2010–2012: Unión La Calera
- 2012–2014: Palestino
- 2014–2015: Santiago Wanderers
- 2015–2016: San Marcos
- 2017: Cobresal
- 2017–2018: Ñublense
- 2019: Rangers de Talca
- 2020–2021: Deportes Copiapó
- 2021: Santiago Wanderers
- 2022–2024: Cobreloa
- 2024: Rangers de Talca
- 2025: Curicó Unido
- 2026: Deportes Puerto Montt
- 2026–: Deportes Temuco
- * Club domestic league appearances and goals

Emiliano Eduardo Astorga Lobos (born 21 September 1960) is a Chilean football manager and former player who played as a defender. He is the current manager of Deportes Temuco.

== Career ==
In 2022, Astorga assumed as manager of Cobreloa in the Primera B de Chile, winning the league title in 2023 and getting promotion to the top division. In May 2024, he left them.

On 11 July 2025, he was appointed as the manager of Curicó Unido.

In 2026, Astorga assumed as manager of Deportes Puerto Montt. He left them in May of the same year due to personal reasons.

== Honours ==
=== Player ===
Santiago Morning

- Tercera División: 1996

=== Manager ===
Cobreloa

- Primera B de Chile: 2023

Individual

- El Gráfico’s Manager of the Season: 2012
