= Carlos Encinas =

Football manager and former player

Personal information
- Full name: Carlos Mauricio Encinas Vásquez
- Date of birth: 26 December 1964 (age 61)
- Place of birth: Santiago, Chile
- Position: Forward

Team information
- Current team: Lautaro de Buin (manager)

Youth career
- Colo-Colo

Senior career*
| Years | Team | Apps | (Gls) |
| 1987–1988 | Audax Italiano | 12 | (1) |
| 1988 | Colo-Colo | 5 | (0) |
| 1989 | Cobreandino | | |
| 1989 | Magallanes | | |
| 1990 | Colo-Colo | | |
| 1991–1992 | Santiago Wanderers | 8 | (0) |

Managerial career
- 1996: Barnechea
- 2004: Universidad de Concepción (assistant)
- 2010: Audax Italiano (assistant)
- 2016–2018: Deportes Melipilla
- 2019: Deportes Melipilla
- 2020–2024: Lautaro de Buin
- 2024–: Lautaro de Buin
- * Club domestic league appearances and goals

Carlos Mauricio Encinas Vásquez (born 26 December 1964), nicknamed Carloto, is a Chilean football manager who manages Lautaro de Buin.

== Career ==
In 2016, Encinas was appointed manager of Chilean third tier side Melipilla, helping them earn promotion to the Chilean second tier. In 2020, he was appointed manager of Lautaro de Buin in the Chilean third tier, helping them earn promotion to the Chilean second tier. Later, that promotion was overruled due to irregularities with the contracts of footballers.

== Personal life ==
He is the grandson of Chilean poet and writer Nicomedes Guzmán.
