= Óscar Correa =

Chilean football manager (born 1982)

Personal information
- Full name: Óscar Heraldo Correa Álvarez
- Date of birth: 9 April 1972 (age 54)
- Place of birth: Galvarino, Chile
- Position: Centre-back

Youth career
- Naval de Talcahuano

Senior career*
Years	Team	Apps	(Gls)
1990	Naval de Talcahuano		
1991	Los Náuticos		
- Curicó Unido
1996	Magallanes	23	(0)
- Unión Española
1999	Universidad de Concepción		

Managerial career
- 2005–2010: Huachipato (youth)
- 2011–2012: Deportes Iquique (assistant)
- 2012–2013: Huachipato (assistant)
- 2016–2017: Deportes Naval
- 2017: Deportes Puerto Montt
- 2018–2019: Magallanes
- 2019–2022: Deportes La Serena (youth)
- 2020: Deportes La Serena (interim)
- 2021: Deportes La Serena (interim)
- 2022: Deportes La Serena (interim)
- 2022: Deportes La Serena (interim)
- * Club domestic league appearances and goals

Óscar Heraldo Correa Álvarez (born 9 April 1972) is a Chilean football manager and former player who played as a centre-back.

== Career ==
Born in Galvarino, Correa had a career as a centre-back playing for Naval, Los Náuticos, Curicó Unido, Magallanes, Unión Española and Universidad de Concepción.

As a football manager, Correa worked for the youth system of Huachipato for five years before working as Jorge Pellicer's assistant. In the end of 2013, he was invited to work at Instituto Nacional del Fútbol (INAF), before being named manager of Deportes Naval on 9 February 2016.

Correa left Naval on 24 January 2017, and took over Deportes Puerto Montt on 12 June. Sacked by the latter on 15 December, he was named in charge of Deportes Magallanes on 26 May 2018.

Dismissed by Magallanes on 15 April 2019, he moved to Deportes La Serena on 30 May, after being named in charge of the youth sides. He was an interim manager of the first team on three occasions, before being named permanently in charge on 24 October 2022, after Pablo Marini left.
