= Cristián Romero (Chilean footballer) =

Chilean footballer and manager

Personal information
- Full name: Crisitán Andrés Romero Godoy
- Date of birth: 26 December 1963 (age 62)
- Place of birth: Santiago, Chile
- Height: 1.72 m (5 ft 7 1/2 in)
- Position: Midfielder

Team information
- Current team: Universidad de Chile (youth coach)

Senior career*
Years	Team	Apps	(Gls)
1984	Cobreloa		
1986–1987	Soinca Bata		
1988	Lota Schwager		
1989–1991	Everton		
1992–1997	Universidad de Chile		
1998	Deportes Iquique		
1999	Everton		
2000	Deportes Melipilla		

International career
1996–1997	Chile	2	(0)

Managerial career
- 2004–2005: Palestino (assistant)
- 2005–2007: Universidad de Chile (youth)
- 2007–2008: Universidad de Chile (assistant)
- 2009–2010: Provincial Osorno
- 2010–2014: Universidad de Chile (youth)
- 2014: Universidad de Chile
- 2015–2017: Iberia (General Manager)
- 2018–: Universidad de Chile (youth)
- 2021: Universidad de Chile (caretaker)
- * Club domestic league appearances and goals

Crisitán Andrés Romero Godoy (born 26 December 1963) is a Chilean football manager and former player who played as a midfielder. He is the current manager of Universidad de Chile's youth sides.

Romero appeared twice for the Chile national team.

== Managerial career ==
In 2004, he began his career as the assistant coach of Horacio Rivas in Palestino. Later, he has mainly worked in Universidad de Chile, both at youth and senior level. As the head coach, he has also worked for Provincial Osorno in the Primera B de Chile. In addition, he was the General Manager of Deportes Iberia between 2015 and 2017.

In 2021, he replaced Esteban Valencia as the coach of Universidad de Chile.

== Honours ==
=== Player ===
Universidad de Chile

- Primera División de Chile (2): 1994, 1995
