= Diego Reveco =

Argentine football manager

Personal information
- Full name: Diego Fernando Felipe Reveco Castro
- Date of birth: 17 June 1992 (age 34)
- Place of birth: Antofagasta, Chile

Team information
- Current team: Deportes Antofagasta (assistant)

Managerial career
- Years: Team
- 2018–2019: Deportes Antofagasta (youth)
- 2019–: Deportes Antofagasta (assistant)
- 2020: Deportes Antofagasta (interim)
- 2021: Deportes Antofagasta (interim)
- 2022: Deportes Antofagasta (interim)

Diego Fernando Felipe Reveco Castro (born 17 June 1992) is a Chilean football manager. He is the current assistant manager of Deportes Antofagasta.

== Career ==
Born in Antofagasta, Reveco graduated from Physical Education at the University of Antofagasta before moving to Santiago to study. He joined hometown side Deportes Antofagasta in the latter stages of 2018, being initially a manager of the youth categories.

Reveco became an assistant 2019 after a request from manager Gerardo Ameli. On 2 December 2020, after Héctor Almandoz left on a mutual consent, he was named interim manager.

Reveco was in charge of the club for one match, a 2–1 home win over Huachipato on 14 December 2020, and subsequently returned to his previous role after Héctor Tapia was appointed as manager. On 29 September 2021, he was again named interim in the place of Juan José Ribera.
