= Estadio Municipal Roberto Bravo Santibáñez =

Multi-use stadium in Melipilla, Chile

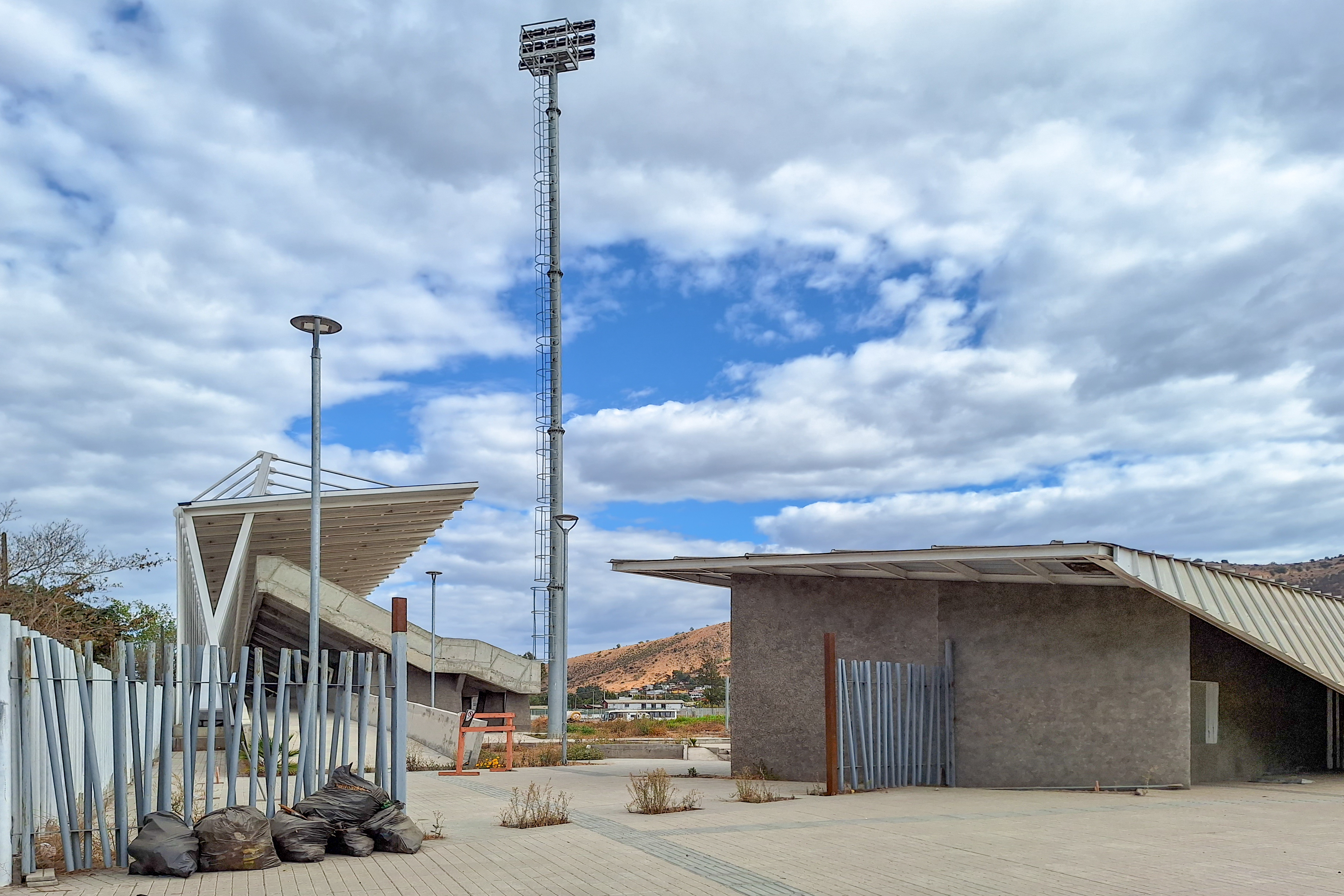
- Interactive map of Estadio Municipal Roberto Bravo Santibáñez
- Location: Melipilla, Chile
- Coordinates: 33°41′49″S 71°13′00″W
- Owner: Municipality of Melipilla
- Capacity: 6,500
- Surface: grass
- Field size: 105 x 75 m

Construction
- Opened: 1942

Tenant
- Deportes Melipilla

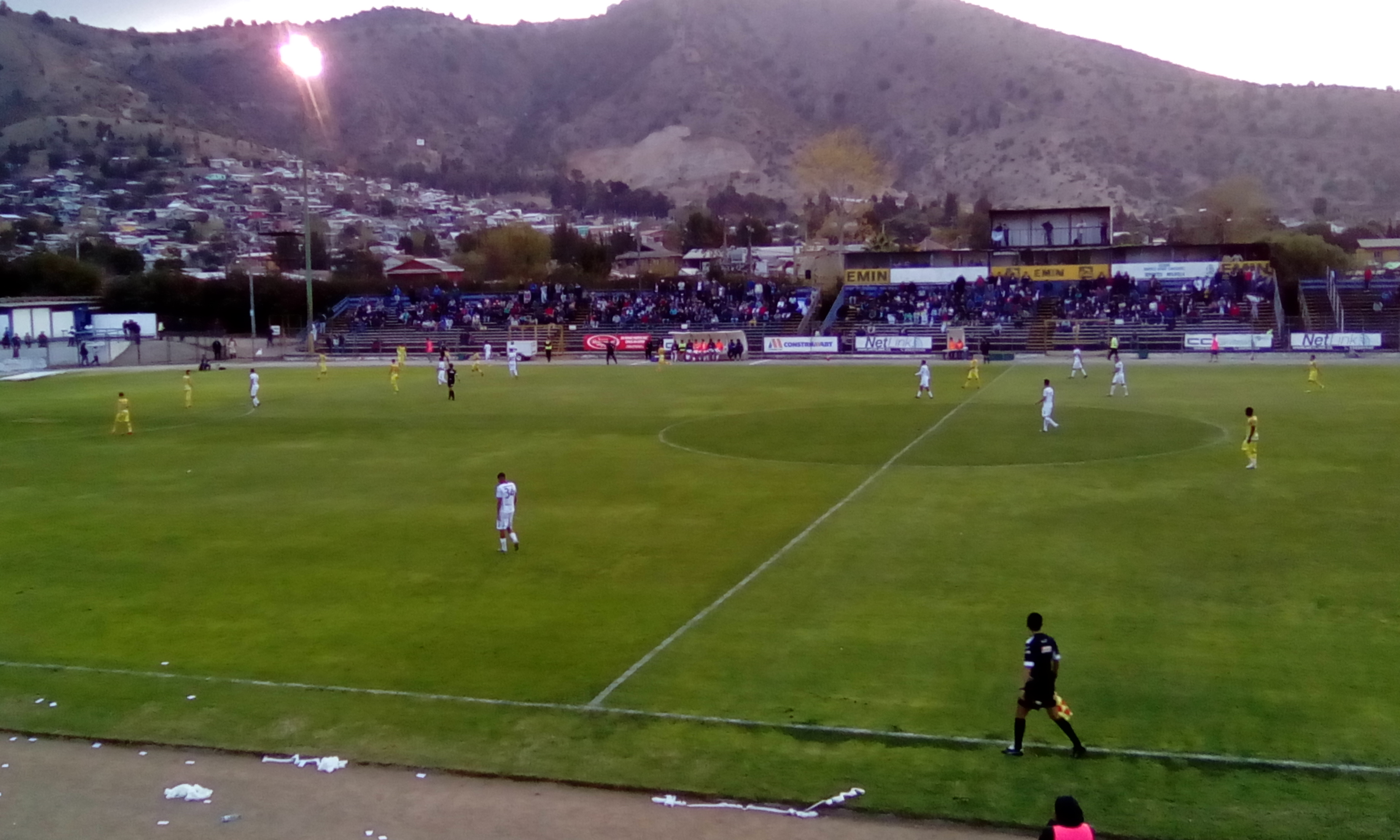
Estadio Roberto Bravo Santibáñez 2017.jpg

Estadio Municipal Roberto Bravo Santibáñez is a multi-use stadium in Melipilla, Chile. It is currently used mostly for football matches and is the home stadium of Deportes Melipilla. The stadium holds 6,500 people and was built in 1942.

It was named after former mayor of Melipilla and deputy for the zone, Roberto Bravo Santibáñez. Santiago Morning also player played their home games here. That team, the Microbuseros, first used the ground in 1982 and returned 27 years later (2010), having played as home side in various venues across the metropolitan area.

== History ==
It was inaugurated in May 1942 by the mayor of that year, Mr. Bravo Santibáñez. It has a capacity of 6,500 spectators. This coming August, full renovation works are scheduled to begin.

In 1985, the venue also hosted Chile ayuda a Chile on 8–9 March, following the 3 March earthquake, an event that managed to collect 500 lorry-loads of supplies in just 30 hours.

In 2008, the Chile Women’s Under-17 National Team played a South American Championship in this stadium.

In 2018, the long-awaited refurbishment project for the stadium was formally approved by the relevant authorities, with an estimated budget of CLP 4,900,000,000. The proposal envisioned new all-seated stands for approximately 3,100 spectators, a high-standard athletics track and upgraded parking facilities.

However, the project subsequently fell into prolonged paralysis. By 2024–2025, the stadium had accumulated seven years of abandonment, with no opening date in sight and substantial structural and financial setbacks. According to municipal assessments, at least a further CLP 5,000,000,000 would be required to complete the works, owing to deterioration, inflation and unresolved technical issues.

In early 2025, the newly elected mayor ordered a full structural analysis of the partially built stadium with the aim of determining how to restart construction safely. The municipal council has stated that works will only resume once the technical review is concluded and a revised budget is secured.

As of mid-2025, the Roberto Bravo Santibáñez Municipal Stadium remains unfinished and closed to the public, pending the relaunch of the project under updated engineering and financial conditions.
