= Ronald Fuentes =

Chilean footballer and manager (born 1969)

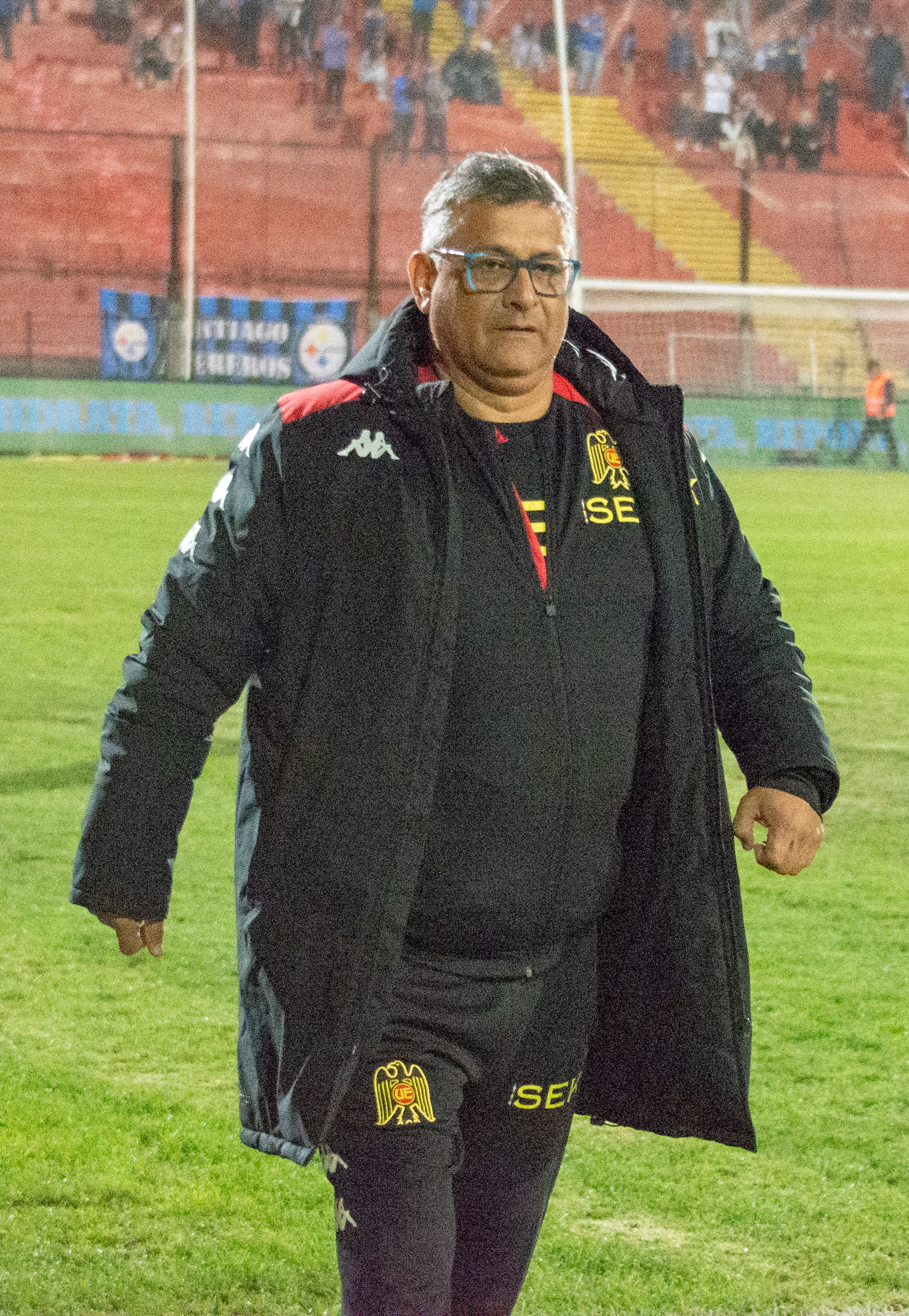
- Fuentes leading Unión Española in 2023

Personal information
- Full name: Ronald Hugo Fuentes Núñez
- Date of birth: 22 June 1969 (age 57)
- Place of birth: Malloco (Peñaflor, Chile)
- Height: 1.75 m (5 ft 9 in)
- Position: Defender

Team information
- Current team: Unión Española (manager)

Youth career
- Cobresal

Senior career*
Years	Team	Apps	(Gls)
1987–1993	Cobresal	84	(2)
1994–2001	Universidad de Chile	130	(1)

International career
1991–2000	Chile	50	(1)

Managerial career
- 2002–2005: Universidad de Chile (youth)
- 2006: Universidad de Chile (assistant)
- 2007–2008: Deportes Melipilla
- 2008–2009: Iberia
- 2010–2011: Unión Española U21
- 2012–2014: Iberia
- 2015–2016: Universidad de Concepción
- 2017–2018: Universidad de Chile (sporting director)
- 2019–2021: Unión Española
- 2021: Santiago Wanderers
- 2021: Rangers
- 2022: Audax Italiano
- 2023: Unión Española
- 2024: Magallanes
- 2025: Ñublense
- 2026–: Unión Española
- * Club domestic league appearances and goals

Ronald Hugo Fuentes Núñez (Malloco, Peñaflor, Chile June 22, 1969) is a Chilean football manager and former player who played as a defender. He is the current manager of Unión Española.

== Club career ==
Fuentes played his entire club career in Chile for two teams, he started his career in 1987 with Cobresal, and in 1994 he joined Universidad de Chile where he won four league titles and two Copa Chile titles.

== International career ==
At international level, Fuentes was capped 50 times and scored 1 goal for the Chile national team between 1991 and 2000, including four games at the 1998 FIFA World Cup.

== Coaching career ==
Fuentes started his career at the youth system of Universidad de Chile and after as assistant coach of Gustavo Huerta.

Fuentes signed with Magallanes in the Primera B de Chile for the 2024 season from Unión Española. In April 2025, he was appointed the manager of Ñublense.

== Personal life ==
Fuentes is nicknamed Chilenita (Little Bicycle Kick).

== Honours ==
=== Player ===
Cobresal

- Copa Chile (1): 1987

Universidad de Chile

- Primera División de Chile (4): 1994, 1995, 1999, 2000
- Copa Chile (2): 1998, 2000
