= Cristián Arán =

Argentine football coach (born 1971)

Personal information
- Full name: Cristián Roberto Arán Rubio
- Date of birth: 4 July 1971 (age 55)
- Place of birth: Casilda, Argentina

Managerial career
- Years: Team
- 1992–1995: Unión Casildense
- Belgrano de Arequito
- 2007–2015: O'Higgins (youth)
- 2011: O'Higgins (interim)
- 2016–2017: O'Higgins
- 2018–2019: Rangers
- 2020: Belgrano de Arequito
- 2021: 9 de Julio de Arequito
- 2021: Deportes Melipilla
- 2022: Deportes Temuco
- 2023: Real Potosí
- 2023: Flamengo (assistant)
- 2024: Real Tomayapo

Cristián Roberto Arán Rubio (born 4 July 1971) is an Argentine football manager.

== Coaching career ==
Born in Casilda, Arán began his career with hometown side CA Unión Casildense before joining Jorge Sampaoli's staff at local sides CA Alumni de Casilda, Argentino de Rosario and was later in charge of CA Belgrano de Arequito. In 2001, he also worked at Central Córdoba de Rosario.

Arán joined O'Higgins in 2007, after a recommendation from Sampaoli. In 2011, he took over the first team in the place of Ivo Basay as interim manager, and in December 2015, was definitely named manager of the main squad after replacing Pablo Sánchez.

Arán resigned from O'Higgins on 31 July 2017, and was appointed in charge of Rangers de Talca on 1 August 2018. He left the club on 12 May of the following year, and returned to his home country on 27 November to take over Belgrano de Arequito.

Arán started the 2021 season in charge of CA 9 de Julio de Arequito before returning to Chile on 1 September, after being named at the helm of Deportes Melipilla. In 2022, he managed Deportes Temuco in the Primera B de Chile.

In April 2023, Arán was appointed manager of Real Potosí for the Copa Simón Bolívar, but left a week later to join Sampaoli's staff at Flamengo, as an assistant. On 9 January 2024, he returned to Bolivia to take over Real Tomayapo, but resigned on 24 May.
