= Pablo Marini =

Argentine football player/manager

Personal information
- Full name: Pablo Alejandro Marini
- Date of birth: 31 January 1967 (age 59)
- Place of birth: Santa Fe, Argentina
- Position: Forward

Youth career
- 1981–1987: Newell's Old Boys

Senior career*
Years	Team	Apps	(Gls)
1987–1988	Instituto	2	
1988–1990	Central		
1990–1993	Argentino de Rosario		
1994	Nueva Chicago	13	(1)
1994–1995	Argentino de Rosario		
1995	Douglas Haig	10	(1)
1995	Arsenal de Sarandí	20	(14)
1997–2001	San Martín	167	(66)
2001	Tivoli Calcio		
2002	Fernández Vial	10	(4)
2002	Juventud Universitario	7	(1)

Managerial career
- 2003–2004: Argentino de Rosario
- 2007: Newell's Old Boys
- 2009–2010: Audax Italiano
- 2010: Chiapas
- 2011: Pachuca
- 2012: Juventud Universitario
- 2012–2013: Audax Italiano
- 2014: Atlante
- 2014–2015: Zacatecas
- 2015–2016: Puebla
- 2016: Veracruz
- 2016–2017: Morelia
- 2017: Unión de Santa Fe
- 2018–2021: Montevideo City Torque
- 2021–2022: LDU Quito
- 2022: Deportes La Serena
- 2024: Montevideo City Torque
- * Club domestic league appearances and goals

Pablo Alejandro Marini (born 31 January 1967) is an Argentine football manager and former player who played as a forward.

== Career ==
Born in Santa Fe, Argentina, Marini played professional football from 1987 to 2002, scoring 154 goals. He began his career with the youth side of Newell's Old Boys. He played senior football for Instituto, Central Córdoba, Argentino de Rosario, FC Basel, Nueva Chicago, Douglas Haig, Arsenal de Sarandí, San Martín de San Juan, Tivoli Calcio, Fernández Vial.

After he retired from playing, Marini became a football coach. He managed Chiapas and Pachuca in Mexico, and Audax Italiano in Chile. He joined Pachuca as manager in August 2010 to replace Guillermo Rivarola and had previously been the manager of Newell's Old Boys. He was the manager of Pachuca for the 2010 FIFA Club World Cup in the United Arab Emirates.

== Managerial statistics ==
=== Managerial statistics ===
As of 19 September 2016 (Note: Includes matches from Liga MX, Copa MX, Supercopa MX)

Team	Nat	From	To	Record							
Team	Nat	From	To	G	W	D	L	GF	GA	GD	Win %
Puebla FC	(Mexico)	2015	2016	41	13	14	14	45	55	−10	31.71
Veracruz	(Mexico)	2016	2016	13	3	4	6	15	23	−8	23.08
Total				54	16	18	20	60	78	−18	29.63
