= Deportes Antofagasta =

Chilean football club

- Full name: Club de Deportes Antofagasta S.A.D.P.
- Nicknames: Pumas; CDA
- Founded: May 14, 1966; 60 years ago
- Ground: Estadio Bicentenario Calvo y Bascuñán
- Capacity: 21,178
- Chairman: Jorge Sánchez
- Manager: John Armijo
- League: Primera B
- 2025: Primera B, 5th of 16
- Website: cdantofagasta.cl
| Home colours | Away colours |

Deportes Antofagasta (also known as CD Antofagasta) is a Chilean football club based in Antofagasta that currently competes in the Primera B. Its home stadium is the Estadio Bicentenario Calvo y Bascuñán, which has a capacity of 21,178.

== History ==
The club was founded on May 14, 1966, when the amateur clubs Unión Bellavista and Portuario Atacama merged. The team's original name was Club de Deportes Antofagasta Portuario.

The team's first manager was Luis Santibañez, future manager of the Chile National Team. The team finished 10th in its first league season.

Under coach Francisco Hormazábal, Antofagasta were crowned champions of the second division in 1968. The final was played on January 19, 1969, against San Luis. Paraguayan player Juan Pelayo Ayala scored the only goal of the match. The team was promoted to the first division after that game.

On July 21, 1974, the team changed its name to Club Regional Antofagasta.

In 1977, the team finished 18th in the table and returned to the second level.

In 1979, Jorge León was named the team's president and changed the club's name to Club de Deportes Antofagasta. The regional was not appropriate anymore, because a second team, Cobreloa, had been established in the Antofagasta Region.

On June 30, 1983 D. Antofagasta, coached by Manuel Rodríguez, returned to the top level once after defeating Lota Schwager 9–0. However the following year the team was again relegated.

D. Antofagasta experienced one of their most successful spans from 1991 through 1995, playing in the top tier under the guidance of Croatian coach Andrija Perčić, with star players such as Marco Cornez and Gabriel Caballero.

In 1997, they once again descended to the second level, after finishing at the bottom of the table.

In 2005, D. Antofagasta gained promotion to the first division along with Santiago Morning.

In 2008, the club returned to the Primera B, finishing at the bottom of the cumulative table 2007–08.

In 2011, they won the Primera B championship and were promoted to the Primera Division.

== Stadium ==
Deportes Antofagasta plays its home matches at the Estadio Regional de Antofagasta, owned by the Municipality of Antofagasta. The stadium was planned as a reserve venue for the FIFA World Cup 1962 and was inaugurated on October 8, 1964, on the grounds of the former Riding Club of Antofagasta. The first professional football match was played there in 1966, and Deportes Antofagasta has played there since then. In 2007, the stadium was closed for repairs, and home games had to be played elsewhere; the Estadio Municipal de La Pintana in Santiago against Deportes Puerto Montt, Estadio Municipal de Calama against Huachipato, Estadio Carlos Dittborn in Arica against Lota Schwager, and until 2013 at the Estadio Parque Juan López.

== Players ==
Current squad of Deportes Antofagasta as of 14 July 2026 (edit)
Sources: ANFP Official Web Site

| No. | | Position | Player |
|---|---|---|---|
| 1 | CHI | GK | Cristóbal Marín |
| 3 | SWE | DF | Manuel Maluenda |
| 4 | CHI | DF | Bastián Tapia (loan from Universidad de Chile) |
| 5 | CHI | DF | Rodrigo Astorga |
| 6 | CHI | DF | Cristián Díaz |
| 7 | CHI | FW | Christian Bravo |
| 8 | CHI | MF | Sebastián Leyton |
| 9 | CHI | FW | Josepablo Monreal |
| 10 | CHI | MF | Diego Rojas |
| 11 | VEN | FW | José Bández |
| 12 | CHI | GK | Fernando Hurtado (c) |
| 13 | PLE | DF | Zacarías Abuhadba (loan from Universidad de Chile) |
| 14 | CHI | FW | Kevin Campillay |
| 15 | CHI | DF | Alex Ibacache |
| 16 | ARG | FW | Matías Gallegos |

| No. | | Position | Player |
|---|---|---|---|
| 17 | VEN | FW | Brayan Hurtado |
| 18 | CHI | MF | Nelson Sepúlveda (loan from Deportes Concepción) |
| 20 | CHI | MF | Adrián Cuadra |
| 21 | CHI | MF | Fabián Manzano |
| 22 | URU | DF | Mathías Suárez |
| 23 | CHI | DF | Franko Siegler |
| 24 | CHI | MF | Patricio Castro |
| 25 | CHI | GK | Juan Cisternas |
| 26 | CHI | MF | Sergio Hinojosa |
| 27 | CHI | MF | Ignacio Apaz |
| 28 | CHI | DF | Diego Salvia |
| 29 | CHI | FW | Martín Vega |
| 31 | CHI | DF | Simón Ramírez |
| 32 | CHI | MF | Vicente Aros |
| 33 | CHI | GK | Lucas Zúñiga |

== Managers ==
- (Chile) Luis Santibáñez (1966)
- (Peru) Santiago García (1967)
- (Chile) Francisco Hormazábal (1968–1969)
- (Spain) (Chile) Paco Molina (1970–1972)
- (Chile) Luis Ibarra (1973)
- (Chile) Raúl Pino (1974)
- (Chile) Rosamel Miranda (1975)
- (Chile) Pedro Araya (1975)
- (Chile) Hernán Carrasco (1975–1976)
- (Chile) Jaime Ramírez (1977)
- (Chile) Domingo Gajardo (1977)
- (Chile) Raúl Pino (1977)
- (Argentina) Donato Hernández (1977)
- (Chile) Jorge Venegas (1978)
- (Chile) Luis Rojo (1978–1979)
- (Chile) José Cárdenas (1980)
- (Chile) Juan Páez (1981)
- (Chile) Juan Letelier (1981)
- (Chile) Manuel Rodríguez (1982)
- (Chile) Juan Letelier (1983)
- (Chile) Mario Páez (1983)
- (Chile) Isaac Carrasco (1983)
- (Chile) Jaime Campos (1983)
- (Chile) Mario Páez (1984)
- (Chile) Sergio Navarro (1985)
- (Chile) Jaime Campos (1985)
- (Chile) Miguel Ángel Arrué (1985)
- (Chile) Alfonso Sepúlveda (1986)
- (Chile) Humberto Cruz (1986)
- (Chile) Miguel Ángel Arrué (1986)
- (Chile) Hernán Godoy (1986–1987)
- (Chile) Jorge Molina (1988)
- (Chile) José Sulantay (1988)
- (Chile) Rolando García (1989)
- (Chile) Mario Páez (1989)
- (Uruguay) Jorge Luis Siviero (1990)
- (Chile) Hugo Solís (1990)
- (Chile) Mario Páez (1991)
- (Croatia) Andrija Perčić (1991–1995)
- (Chile) Mario Páez (1995–1997)
- (Chile) José Sulantay (1997)
- (Chile) Dagoberto Olivares (1997–1998)
- (Chile) Mario Páez (1998–1999)
- (Paraguay) Rogelio Delgado (2000)
- (Chile) Luis Marcoleta (2001–2002)
- (Chile) Mario Páez (2003–2004)
- (Chile) Carlos Rojas (2004)
- (Chile) Hernán Ibarra (2005)
- (Argentina) Oscar Malbernat (2006)
- (Chile) Fernando Díaz (2007)
- (Argentina) (Chile) Mario Véner (2008)
- (Chile) Hernán Ibarra (2008–2010)
- (Chile) Gustavo Huerta (2011–2014)
- (Chile) Jaime Muñoz (2014)
- (Chile) Jaime Vera (2014)
- (Chile) Sergio Marchant (2014)
- (Chile) José Cantillana (2015)
- (Chile) Sergio Marchant (2015)
- (Spain) Beñat San José (2015–2016)
- (Chile) Fernando Vergara (2016–2017)
- (Argentina) Nicolás Larcamón (2017)
- (Argentina) Gerardo Ameli (2018–2019)
- (Argentina) Walter Fiori (2019)
- (Argentina) Juan Manuel Azconzábal (2019–2020)
- (Argentina) Héctor Almandoz (2020)
- (Chile) Diego Reveco (2020)
- (Chile) Héctor Tapia (2020–2021)
- (Chile) Juan José Ribera (2021)
- (Chile) Diego Reveco (2021)
- (Venezuela) Juan Domingo Tolisano (2022)
- (Chile) Diego Reveco (2022)
- (Argentina) Javier Torrente (2022)
- (Chile) John Armijo (2023–2024)
- (Chile) Quemel Farías (2024)
- (Spain) Pedro Gómez (2024)
- (Chile) Diego Reveco (2024)
- (Chile) Hernán Peña (2025)
- (Chile) Carlos Escudero (2025)
- (Chile) Luis Marcoleta (2025–)

== Honors ==
- Primera B: 2

1968, 2011

- Copa Apertura Segunda División: 1

1990

== South American cups history ==
| Season | Competition | Round | Country | Club | Home | Away | Aggregate |
|---|---|---|---|---|---|---|---|
| 2019 | Copa Sudamericana | First Round | (Brazil) | Fluminense | 1–2 | 0–0 | 1–2 |

== Club facts ==
- 30 seasons in Campeonato Nacional: (1969-1977; 1983-1984; 1991-1997; 2006-2008; 2012-2022)
- 25 seasons in Primera B: (1966-1968; 1978-1982; 1985-1990; 1998-2005; 2009-2011; 2023-)
- 1 appearance in Copa Sudamericana: (2019)
- Highest home attendance — 32,663 v. Colo-Colo (22 July 1973)
- Primera División Best Position — 4th (2018)
- Copa Chile Best Season — Semifinals (1992, 1994, 1996, 2014-15, 2017)
