= Deportes Melipilla =

Chilean football club

- Full name: Corporacion de Deportes Melipilla
- Nicknames: Potros; Caballos
- Founded: January 24, 1992
- Ground: Estadio Municipal Roberto Bravo Santibáñez; Melipilla, Chile
- Capacity: 6,000
- Chairman: Leonardo Zúñiga
- Manager: Cristián Arán
- League: Segunda División Profesional de Chile
- 2025: 12th (Relegated)
- Website: clubdeportesmelipilla.cl
Home colours	Away colours

Deportes Melipilla is a Chilean football club, based on Melipilla, a comune in the Santiago Metropolitan Region. It was founded on January 24, 1992, as a successor of Club Deportivo Soinca Bata. The club has its classic rival, San Antonio Unido match known as "Clásico del Maipo" or "The Maipo Derbi".

Deportes Melipilla has its own stadium called Estadio Municipal Roberto Bravo Santibáñez situated in its city with a capacity of 6,000.

Deportes Melipilla were expelled from the ANFP on 27 December 2021 due to irregularities with the contracts of footballers.

== History ==
=== Early years ===
Deportes Melipilla became the successor to Club Deportivo Soinca Bata — founded on 1 July 1963 —, assuming its federative rights on 24 January 1992 after the Bata footwear company determined it could no longer sustain the financial demands of operating a professional football club. The Club de Deportes Melipilla subsequently inherited Soinca Bata's squad and its place in the Segunda División.

In its first season, Deportes Melipilla earned promotion to the Primera División via the Liguilla de Promoción. However, the club was relegated the following year through the same playoff system.

The team competed in the Segunda División from 1994 to 2004. During this period, its performances were inconsistent: in some seasons it struggled near the relegation zone to the Tercera División, while in others it came close to securing promotion to the Primera División. In 2000, for instance, the club was in a tight promotion race with Unión San Felipe and Rangers de Talca, both of whom ultimately secured promotion that season.

Among the most notable players to represent the club during this era were Mario Araya, Luis Cueto, Rodrigo Romero, Aníbal Pinto, Ronny Fernández, Alejandro Tello, Iván Arenas and Juan Carlos Ibáñez.

In 2004, under head coach Juan Ubilla, the club won its first professional title by claiming the Primera B championship, finishing unbeaten in the final stage of the tournament. Melipilla lifted the trophy in Talcahuano at Estadio El Morro after defeating Naval de Talcahuano, and later sealed promotion with a 3–0 victory over O'Higgins. The promotion-winning squad featured Argentine goalkeeper Christian Traverso, who served as team captain.

=== 21st century ===
In 2004, Deportes Melipilla won its first professional title by claiming the Primera B championship under coach Juan Ubilla. The team went unbeaten in the final stage and lifted the trophy in Talcahuano at the Estadio El Morro after defeating Naval. Promotion to the top flight was confirmed with a 3–0 win over O'Higgins. Goalkeeper Christian Traverso captained the squad.

Melipilla’s 2005 spell in the Chilean Primera División was short-lived. After an uneven campaign that included a 5–0 defeat to Universidad Católica in the club’s top-flight debut of the season, the team was relegated after losing the promotion/relegation play-off (Liguilla de Promoción) to O'Higgins 4–3 on aggregate. Ubilla was replaced during the season by Guillermo Páez, and despite reinforcements such as Alan Monegat, Maximiliano Zanello, Freddy Ferragut, Ricardo Queraltó, Roberto Gutiérrez and Rodrigo Barrera, the club could not avoid relegation.

In 2006, led by first-time head coach Luis Musrri, Melipilla won the Primera B title again and returned to the Primera División, securing promotion in the final phase of the championship.

The club remained in the top flight in 2007–08. In 2007, Musrri guided Melipilla to its best-ever top-tier finish (ninth overall), before departing during the Clausura and being replaced by Ronald Fuentes. In 2008, after finishing last in the Apertura and undergoing further coaching changes—Ricardo Dabrowski and later José Díaz—the club was relegated to Primera B.

The 2009 season was marked by a severe financial crisis. After a poor run under Dutch coach Jorrit Smink, former player Emiliano Astorga took charge and improved results on the pitch. Nevertheless, the ANFP imposed sporting penalties for non-compliance with salary and social-security obligations. On 22 June 2009, the ANFP’s financial control body ordered Melipilla’s administrative relegation to the Tercera División A due to repeated failures to provide proof of payments and payroll documentation.

Melipilla competed in Tercera A in 2010–11 under coaches including Luis Abarca, Hernán Godoy and Guillermo Páez, and remained in the division. In 2012, the club was invited to join the newly created Segunda División Profesional —a third-tier league organized by the ANFP— as one of its founding members, with the place framed as compensation linked to the 2009 administrative relegation.

In the 2016–17 campaign, managed by Carlos Encinas, Melipilla narrowly missed promotion, finishing behind Barnechea. Later in 2017, the club contested a promotion play-off against Deportes Vallenar. Following a refereeing controversy in the penalty shoot-out and an ANFP-ordered retake, Melipilla was ultimately declared the winner and promoted to Primera B.

On 7 February 2021, Melipilla returned to the Primera División after defeating Unión San Felipe on penalties under coach John Armijo. After the 2021 season, the club faced complaints alleging contractual and payment irregularities. On 27 December 2021, the ANFP Tribunal’s First Chamber ordered the club’s expulsion from professional football, but the Second Chamber overturned the expulsion and instead imposed a six-point deduction, which relegated Melipilla to the Primera B.

In 2022, after a season that featured three different head coaches, Melipilla was relegated again —this time to the Segunda División Profesional— after a defeat to Deportes Santa Cruz.

== Titles ==
- Primera B de Chile: 2

2004, 2006

== Squad ==
Current squad of Deportes Melipilla as of 7 September 2021 (edit)
Sources: ANFP Official Web Site

No.		Position	Player
1	CHI	GK	Eryin Sanhueza
2	CHI	DF	Juan José Castillo
3	CHI	MF	Jorge Araya
4	CHI	DF	Gonzalo Santelices
5	CHI	DF	Cristian Toro
6	CHI	MF	José Luis Cabión
7	CHI	FW	Josué Ovalle
8	CHI	MF	Francisco Lara
9	ARG	FW	Ezequiel Naya
10	CHI	MF	Luis Valenzuela
11	CHI	FW	Franco Ortega
12	CHI	GK	Diego Fuentes
13	CHI	DF	Reinaldo Ahumada
14	CHI	FW	Martín Arenas
15	ARG	FW	Patricio Vidal
16	CHI	DF	Eduardo Navarrete

No.		Position	Player
17	CHI	DF	Cristián Magaña
18	CHI	FW	Giovanni Bustos
19	CHI	DF	Alejandro Vásquez
20	CHI	MF	Simón Arias
22	CHI	FW	Diego Alvarado
23	CHI	MF	José Cantillana
24	CHI	FW	Kevin Rojas
25	CHI	DF	Marcel Cortés
26	CHI	MF	Christopher Penroz
27	CHI	DF	Andrés Segovia
28	CHI	FW	Mauro Lopes
29	CHI	FW	Luis Vargas
30	CHI	FW	César Díaz
31	CHI	FW	Francisco Robles
32	CHI	GK	Eduardo Ayala
33	URU	DF	Enzo Ruiz

== Managers ==
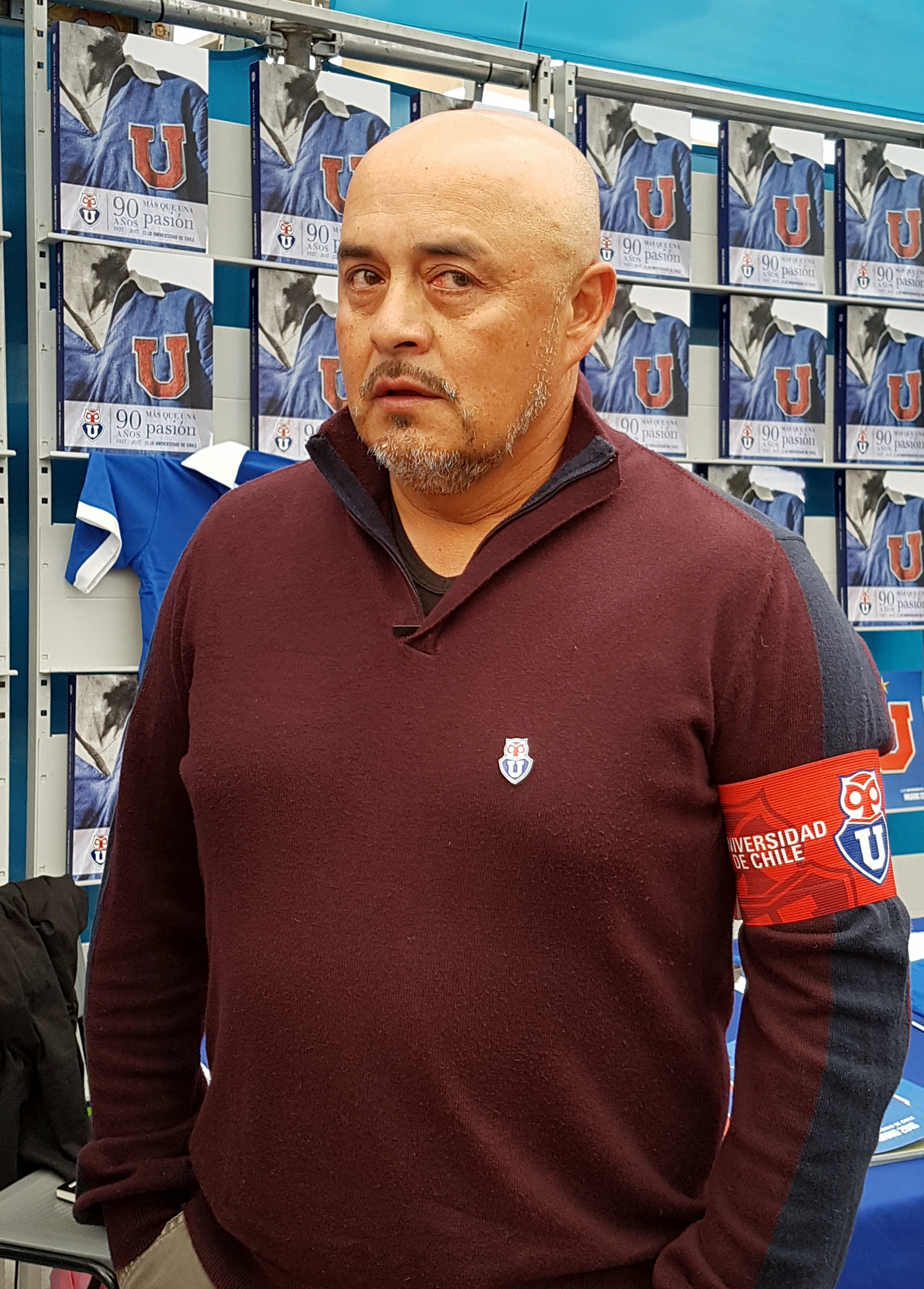
Luis Musrri, manager of Melipilla from 2006 to 2007.

Throughout the 1990s and early 21st century, Deportes Melipilla experienced frequent managerial turnover, reflecting both sporting inconsistency and periods of institutional instability. In 1992 alone, the club was managed by Guillermo Páez, Manuel Rodríguez Vega and Claudio Mendoza. The following year Juan Páez took charge, while in 1994 the team was coached by Leonel Herrera Rojas and again Claudio Mendoza.

In 1995, Luis Ahumada and Hernán Godoy each had spells in charge, and in 1996 the bench was shared between Guillermo Páez and Humberto Cruz. Toward the end of the decade, Melipilla was managed by Gustavo Cortés (1997), Guillermo Páez (1998), and Horacio Rivas (1999–2000), the latter overseeing a comparatively longer process.

The early 2000s continued this pattern. After short tenures by Rodolfo Dubó and Guillermo Páez in 2001, Gustavo Huerta assumed the role in 2002, preceding one of the club’s more stable periods under Juan Ubilla (2002–2005). Páez returned briefly in 2005, followed by notable spells under Luis Musrri (2006–2007) and Ronald Fuentes (2007–2008). The 2008 season was particularly unstable, featuring interim and permanent stints by José Díaz and Ricardo Dabrowski.

The institutional crisis of 2009 coincided with short-lived appointments for Jorrit Smink and Emiliano Astorga. In subsequent seasons, the team was led by Luis Abarca (2010), Hernán Godoy and Guillermo Páez (2011), as well as Orlando Mondaca (2012) and Luis Fredes (2013). Between 2013 and 2016, Nelson Cossío had one of the more sustained tenures, briefly interrupted by Rodrigo Meléndez in 2014.

From 2016 onward, the club entered another phase of managerial changes, including Carlos Encinas (2016–2018, and again in 2019 alongside Jorge Contreras), as well as spells by Jorge Miranda, Rodrigo Córdova, Gino Valentini and Héctor Adomaitis, the latter also managing between 2019 and 2020. In recent years, Melipilla has been coached by John Armijo (2020–2021), Jesús Escalante and Cristián Arán (2021), Ariel Pereyra, Jaime Vera and Eros Pérez (2022), followed by Hernán Peña (2023) and Víctor Quintanilla (2023–present).

Overall, the club’s managerial history is characterized by short cycles and recurring appointments—particularly of figures such as Guillermo Páez, José Díaz and Carlos Encinas—highlighting a pattern of high turnover in the sporting leadership over more than three decades.
