= Lautaro de Buín =

Chilean football club

- Full name: Club Social y Deportivo Lautaro de Buin
- Nicknames: Toqui (Toqui); Guerreros (Warriors)
- Founded: January 23, 1923; 103 years ago
- Ground: Estadio Lautaro; Buin, Chile
- Capacity: 3,700
- Manager: Patricio Zúñiga
- Coach: Carlos Encinas
- League: Segunda División
- 2020: 2nd
Home colours	Away colours

Club Social y Deportivo Lautaro de Buin is a Chilean Football club, based in Buin, Chile. They currently play in the fourth level of Chilean football, the Tercera Division A.

The club were founded on January 23, 1923 and participated for 3 years in Segunda División Profesional, 14 years in Tercera División A and 11 years in Tercera División B.

== Seasons played ==
- 3 seasons in Segunda División
- 14 seasons in Tercera División A
- 11 seasons in Tercera División B

== Current squad ==
Current squad of Lautaro de Buin as of July 2022 (edit)
Sources: ANFP Official Web Site

No.		Position	Player
1	CHI	GK	Andrés Fernández
2	CHI	DF	Bernardo Mendoza
3	CHI	DF	Hernán Ulloa
4	CHI	DF	Kevin Hidalgo
5	CHI	DF	Carlos Gutiérrez
6	CHI	MF	Carlos Toselli
7	CHI	FW	Matías Rosas
8	CHI	MF	Sebastián Pino
9	CHI	FW	Diego Cuéllar
10	CHI	MF	René Meléndez
11	CHI	FW	Pablo Vergara
12	CHI	GK	Andre Jerez
13	URU	DF	Rodrigo Canosa
14	CHI	MF	José Luis Silva
15	CHI	DF	Christian Latorre

No.		Position	Player
16	CHI	FW	Felipe Durán
17	CHI	FW	Nicolás Solabarrieta
18	CHI	DF	Benjamín Gómez
19	CHI	DF	Boris Lagos
20	CHI	MF	Misael Llantén
21	CHI	MF	Kevin Fernández
22	CHI	DF	Joshoa Sotomayor
23	CHI	MF	Michel Quezada
24	CHI	FW	Nicolás Gutiérrez
25	CHI	GK	Dilan López
26	CHI	DF	Kurt Zimmermann
28	CHI	DF	Carlos Bustamante
30	CHI	MF	Gonzalo Mendiburo
31	CHI	FW	Giovanni Bustos

Manager: Carloto

== See also ==
- Chilean football league system
