= 2020 Club Deportivo Universidad Católica season =

80th season in existence of Club Deportivo Universidad Católica

Universidad Católica
2020 season
- President: Juan Tagle
- Head coach: Ariel Holan
- Stadium: San Carlos de Apoquindo
- League: 1st
- Supercopa: Winners
- Libertadores: Group stage
- Sudamericana: Quarter-finals
- Top goalscorer: League: Fernando Zampedri (28); All: Fernando Zampedri (20)
- Biggest win: Universidad Católica 5–3 Antofagasta
- Biggest defeat: Universidad Católica 2–3 Curicó Unido; Universidad Católica 2–3 Palestino
Home colours	Away colours	Third colours

The 2020 Club Deportivo Universidad Católica season was the 80th season and the club's 46th consecutive season in the top flight of Chilean football. In addition to the domestic league, Universidad Católica participated in the season's editions of the Supercopa de Chile, the Copa Libertadores and the Copa Sudamericana

== Squad ==
No.	Player	Nationality	Position	Date of birth (age)	Year signed	Signed from
Goalkeepers
1	Matías Dituro	(Argentina)	GK	8 May 1987 (age 33)	2018	Bolívar
17	Cristopher Toselli	(Chile)	GK	15 June 1988 (age 32)	2007	Academy
28	Vicente Bernedo	(Chile)	GK	22 January 2001 (age 19)	2020	Academy
Defenders
2	Germán Lanaro	(Argentina) (Chile)	CB	21 March 1986 (age 34)	2015	Palestino
3	Cristóbal Finch	(Chile)	CB	1 June 2002 (age 23)	2020	Academy
4	Carlos Salomón	(Chile)	CB	28 March 2000 (age 20)	2020	Academy
5	Valber Huerta	(Chile)	CB	26 August 1993 (age 27)	2019	Huachipato
7	Tomás Asta-Buruaga	(Chile)	RB / CB	11 October 1996 (age 24)	2020	Deportes Antofagasta
14	Juan Fuentes	(Chile)	CB / DM	21 March 1995 (age 30)	2020	Estudiantes
21	Raimundo Rebolledo	(Chile)	RB / RWB	14 May 1997 (age 23)	2015	Academy
23	Juan Cornejo	(Chile)	LB / RB	27 February 1990 (age 30)	2019	León
24	Alfonso Parot	(Chile)	LB / RB	15 October 1989 (age 31)	2019	Rosario Central
33	Aaron Astudillo	(Venezuela)	RB / RWB	17 April 2000 (age 20)	2021	Academy
Midfielders
6	Francisco Silva	(Chile)	CM / DM	11 February 1986 (age 34)	2019	Independiente
8	Ignacio Saavedra	(Chile)	CM / DM	12 January 1999 (age 21)	2018	Academy
11	Luciano Aued	(Argentina)	CM / DM	1 March 1987 (age 33)	2017	Racing
18	Diego Buonanotte	(Argentina)	AM	19 April 1988 (age 32)	2016	AEK
26	Marcelino Núñez	(Chile)	AM / CM	1 March 2000 (age 20)	2020	Academy
Forwards
9	Fernando Zampedri	(Argentina)	ST	14 February 1988 (age 32)	2020	Rosario Central
10	Edson Puch	(Chile)	LW	9 April 1986 (age 34)	2019	Querétaro
15	Gastón Lezcano	(Argentina)	RW	21 November 1986 (age 34)	2020	Morelia
16	César Munder	(Chile)	LW	7 January 2000 (age 20)	2020	Academy
19	José Pedro Fuenzalida (captain)	(Chile)	RB / RWB / RW	22 February 1985 (age 35)	2016	Boca Juniors
20	Gonzalo Tapia	(Chile)	RW	18 February 2002 (age 18)	2020	Academy
22	Bruno Barticciotto	(Chile)	RW	7 May 2001 (age 19)	2020	Academy
27	Alexander Aravena	(Chile)	ST	6 September 2002 (age 18)	2020	Academy
30	Diego Valencia	(Chile)	ST / RW	14 January 2000 (age 20)	2018	Academy
36	Clemente Montes	(Chile)	LW	25 April 2001 (age 19)	2020	Academy
Player(s) on loan during this season
13	Benjamín Kuscevic	(Chile)	CB	2 May 1996 (age 24)	2014	Academy
16	César Pinares	(Chile)	AM / CM	23 May 1991 (age 29)	2019	Colo-Colo
29	Stefano Magnasco	(Chile)	RB / RWB	28 September 1992 (age 28)	2014	FC Groningen

== Transfers ==
=== In ===
Date	Pos.	Name	From	Type	Ref.
6 January 2020	FW	(Argentina) Gastón Lezcano	(Mexico) Monarcas Morelia	Free transfer	
10 January 2020	FW	(Chile) Edson Puch	(Mexico) Pachuca	€360. 000	

=== Out ===
Date	Pos.	Name	To	Type	Ref.
13 December 2019	MF	(Chile) César Fuentes	Colo-Colo	Contract terminated	
20 December 2019	DF	(Chile) Juan Carlos Espinoza	Coquimbo Unido	Contract terminated	
1 January 2020	MF	(Chile) Diego Rojas	Unión La Calera	Contract terminated	
7 January 2020	FW	(Argentina) Sebastián Sáez	Unión La Calera	Contract terminated	
9 January 2020	FW	(Chile) Jeisson Vargas	Unión La Calera	Contract terminated	
10 January 2020	MF	(Chile) Carlos Lobos	Everton	Contract terminated	
13 March 2020	FW	(Chile) Matías Rosas	Deportes Copiapó	Contract terminated	
19 March 2020	FW	(Colombia) Duvier Riascos	(Bolivia) Always Ready	Contract terminated	
4 November 2020	DF	(Chile) Benjamín Kuscevic	(Brazil) Palmeiras	€1.500. 000	
8 November 2020	MF	(Chile) César Pinares	(Brazil) Grêmio	€1.300. 000	
19 November 2020	DF	(Chile) Stefano Magnasco	Deportes La Serena	Contract terminated	

=== Loans in ===
Date	Position	Name	From	End date	Ref.
30 December 2019	FW	(Argentina) Fernando Zampedri	(Argentina) Rosario Central	End of season	
1 January 2020	DF	(Chile) Juan Cornejo	(Mexico) León	End of season	
3 January 2020	DF	(Chile) Tomás Asta-Buruaga	Deportes Antofagasta	End of season	
4 November 2020	DF	(Chile) Juan Fuentes	(Argentina) Estudiantes	30 June 2021	

=== Loans out ===
Date	Position	Name	From	End date	Ref.
27 December 2019	GK	(Chile) Miguel Vargas	Unión La Calera	End of season	
27 December 2019	FW	(Chile) Brian Leiva	Deportes Melipilla	End of season	
1 January 2020	FW	(Chile) Sebastián Pérez	Ñublense	End of season	
1 January 2020	MF	(Chile) Kevin Medel	Deportes La Serena	End of season	
1 January 2020	DF	(Chile) Benjamin Vidal	Coquimbo Unido	End of season	
1 January 2020	MF	(Chile) Andrés Souper	Deportes Antofagasta	End of season	
1 January 2020	MF	(Chile) Sergio Arriagada	Deportes La Serena	End of season	
2 January 2020	FW	(Chile) Diego Vallejos	Coquimbo Unido	End of season	
3 January 2020	MF	(Chile) David Henríquez	Barnechea	End of season	
3 January 2020	DF	(Chile) Yerco Oyanedel	Rangers	End of season	
7 January 2020	DF	(Chile) Vicente Fernández	Palestino	End of season	
9 January 2020	DF	(Chile) Yonathan Parancán	Barnechea	End of season	
29 January 2020	DF	(Chile) Enzo Ferrario	Deportes La Serena	End of season	
24 October 2020	MF	(Chile) Jaime Carreño	Universidad de Concepción	End of season	

=== New contracts ===
Date	Pos.	Name	Contract length	Contract ends	Ref.
1 January 2020	FW	(Chile) Alexander Aravena	3-year	2022	
1 January 2020	DF	(Chile) Juan Cornejo	1-year	2020	
10 January 2020	FW	(Chile) Edson Puch	2-year	2021	
6 December 2020	DF	(Venezuela) (Chile) Aaron Astudillo	3-year	2023	
6 December 2020	DF	(Chile) Carlos Salomón	3-year	2023	
6 December 2020	FW	(Chile) Bruno Barticciotto	3-year	2023	

== Competitions ==
=== Overview ===
Competition	First match	Last match	Starting round	Final position	Record							
Competition	First match	Last match	Starting round	Final position	Pld	W	D	L	GF	GA	GD	Win %
League	26 January 2020	14 February 2021	Matchday 1	Winners	34	18	11	5	65	35	+30	52.94
Supercopa de Chile	21 March 2021	21 March 2021	Final	Winners	1	1	0	0	4	2	+2	100.00
Copa Libertadores	3 March 2020	22 October 2020	Group stage	Group stage	6	2	1	3	6	9	−3	33.33
Copa Sudamericana	29 October 2020	15 December 2020	Second round	Quarter-finals	6	3	1	2	7	7	+0	50.00
Total					47	24	13	10	82	53	+29	51.06

Source: Soccerway

=== Primera Division ===
==== League table ====
Pos	Team	Pld	W	D	L	GF	GA	GD	Pts	Qualification or relegation
1	Universidad Católica (C)	34	18	11	5	65	35	+30	65	Qualification for Copa Libertadores group stage
2	Unión La Calera	34	17	6	11	59	41	+18	57	Qualification for Copa Libertadores group stage
3	Universidad de Chile	34	13	13	8	49	33	+16	52	Qualification for Copa Libertadores second stage
4	Unión Española	34	14	10	10	55	53	+2	52	Qualification for Copa Libertadores second stage
5	Palestino	34	14	9	11	49	45	+4	51	Qualification for Copa Sudamericana first stage

Source: ANFP, Soccerway
Rules for classification: 1) Points, 2) Playoff game (only if needed to decide championship between two teams), 3) Goal difference, 4) Matches won, 5) Goals for, 6) Away goals for, 7) Red cards, 8) Yellow cards, 9) Drawing of lots.
(C) Champions

==== Results summary ====
Overall								Home						Away					
Pld	W	D	L	GF	GA	GD	Pts	W	D	L	GF	GA	GD	W	D	L	GF	GA	GD
34	18	11	5	65	35	+30	65	9	6	2	35	16	+19	9	5	3	30	19	+11

Source: Primera Division

==== Results by round ====
Round	1	2	3	4	5	6	7	8	9	10	11	12	13	14	15	16	17	18	19	20	21	22	23	24	25	26	27	28	29	30	31	32	33	34
Ground	A	H	A	A	H	A	H	A	H	A	H	A	H	H	A	A	H	H	A	H	A	H	H	A	H	A	H	A	H	A	H	A	H	A
Result	W	W	W	W	W	D	L	W	W	W	W	D	W	D	L	W	W	W	L	W	D	D	L	L	D	D	W	W	D	D	D	W	D	W
Position	2	1	1	1	3	1	1	1	1	1	1	1	1	1	1	3	1	1	1	1	1	1	1	1	1	1	1	1	1	1	1	1	1	1

Source: Primera Division
A = Away; H = Home; W = Win; D = Draw; L = Loss

==== Matches ====
26 January 2020 1	Santiago Wanderers	0:3	Universidad Católica	Valparaíso
12:00		Report	37' (pen.) Aued; 87' Lezcano; 90+3' Zampedri	Stadium: Elías Figueroa; Attendance: 12.097; Referee: Eduardo Gamboa

2 February 2020 2	Universidad Católica	3:2	O'Higgins F.C.	Las Condes
18:00	Puch 14'; Kuscevic 65'; Valencia 90+1'	Report	51' Gutiérrez; 81' Meneses	Stadium: San Carlos; Attendance: 8.741; Referee: Julio Bascuñán

9 February 2020 3	Deportes Antofagasta	2:3	Universidad Católica	Antofagasta
12:00	Bello 35' (pen.); Muñoz 90+2'	Report	25' Puch; 45', 79' Zampedri	Stadium: Calvo y Bascuñán; Attendance: 4.073; Referee: Felipe González

16 February 2020 4	Colo-Colo	0:2	Universidad Católica	Macul
18:00		Report	46' Aued; 70' Pinares	Stadium: Monumental; Attendance: 13.000; Referee: Piero Maza

21 February 2020 5	Universidad Católica	3:1	Deportes Iquique	Las Condes
18:30	Aued 25' (pen.); Zampedri 36'; Puch 61'	Report	47' Zúñiga	Stadium: San Carlos; Attendance: 8.610; Referee: Francisco Gilabert

28 February 2020 6	Unión La Calera	1:1	Universidad Católica	La Calera
18:30	Kuscevic 32' (o.g.)	Report	15' Zampedri	Stadium: Nicolás Chahuán; Attendance: 3.548; Referee: Julio Bascuñán

29 August 2020 7	Universidad Católica	0:1	Unión Española	Las Condes
18:30		Report	7' Galdames	Stadium: San Carlos; Attendance: 0 Referee: Eduardo Gamboa

14 March 2020 8	Cobresal	0:1	Universidad Católica	El Salvador
12:00		Report	86' Aued	Stadium: El Cobre; Attendance: 1.014; Referee: José Cabero

5 September 2020 9	Universidad Católica	4:1	Coquimbo Unido	Las Condes
14:30	Aued 25' (pen.), 83' (pen.); Fuenzalida 35'; Pinares 45'		71' Pinto	Stadium: San Carlos; Attendance: 0 Referee: Felipe González

9 September 2020 10	C.D. Huachipato	1:3	Universidad Católica	Talcahuano
11:00	Martínez 57'	Report	38' Fuenzalida; 54' Zampedri; 87' Munder	Stadium: Estadio CAP; Attendance: 0 Referee: Nicolás Gamboa

13 September 2020 11	Universidad Católica	3:0	Audax Italiano	Las Condes
16:00	Pinares 28'; Aued 39' (pen.); Torres 41' (o.g.)	Report		Stadium: San Carlos; Attendance: 0 Referee: Francisco Gilabert

26 September 2020 12	Everton	2:2	Universidad Católica	Viña del Mar
16:00	Cuevas 49'; Cerato 51'	Report	46' Zampedri; 71' (pen.) Aued	Stadium: Sausalito; Attendance: 0 Referee: José Cabero

4 October 2020 13	Universidad Católica	3:0	Universidad de Chile	Las Condes
14:00	Pinares 45+3' (pen.); Aued 70' (pen.); Zampedri 82'	Report		Stadium: San Carlos; Attendance: 0 Referee: Felipe González Alveal

10 October 2020 14	Universidad Católica	1:1	Universidad de Concepción	Las Condes
18:30	Puch 73'	Report	20' Carvallo	Stadium: San Carlos; Attendance: 0 Referee: Cristián Droguett

11 November 2020 15	Curicó Unido	3:2	Universidad Católica	Curicó
16:00	Parra 28' (pen.); Castro 41' (pen.), 90+1' (pen.)	Report	56' (pen.), 90+6' Zampedri	Stadium: La Granja; Attendance: 0 Referee: Nicolás Gamboa

8 November 2020 16	Palestino	1:4	Universidad Católica	La Cisterna
16:00	Farías 13' (pen.)	Report	36' Asta-Buruaga; 54' (o.g.) Felipe; 66' Zampedri; 86' Munder	Stadium: Municipal; Attendance: 0 Referee: Julio Bascuñán

1 November 2020 17	Universidad Católica	3:0	Deportes La Serena	Las Condes
18:30	Puch 4'; Lezcano 48'; Valencia 90+3'	Report		Stadium: San Carlos; Attendance: 0 Referee: Ángelo Hermosilla

15 November 2020 18	Universidad Católica	2:1	Cobresal	Las Condes
21:00	Zampedri 56' (pen.), 79'	Report	39' Ragusa	Stadium: San Carlos; Referee: Francisco Gilabert

18 November 2020 19	Coquimbo Unido	2:1	Universidad Católica	Coquimbo
21:30	Abrigo 37', 67'	Report	90' Aued	Stadium: Francisco Sánchez; Referee: Juan Ignacio Lara

22 November 2020 20	Universidad Católica	5:3	Deportes Antofagasta	Las Condes
21:30	Fuenzalida 6', 28'; Huerta 32'; Fuentes 59'; Zampedri 90' (pen.)	Report	13' Figueroa; 55' Freitas; 81' F. Flores	Stadium: San Carlos; Referee: José Cabero

23 December 2020 21	Universidad de Chile	0:0	Universidad Católica	Ñuñoa
18:30		Report		Stadium: Nacional; Referee: Roberto Tobar

30 December 2020 22	Universidad Católica	1:1	Santiago Wanderers	Las Condes
20:30	Zampedri 12'	Report	38' Ubilla	Stadium: San Carlos; Referee: Francisco Gilabert

25 January 2021 23	Universidad Católica	2:3	Palestino	Las Condes
20:00	Núñez 45+8'; Acevedo 69' (o.g.)	Report	17', 51', 90+9' (pen.) Jiménez	Stadium: San Carlos; Referee: Juan Ignacio Lara

30 January 2021 24	O'Higgins	2:0	Universidad Católica	Rancagua
19:00	Castro 34'; Larrondo 62'	Report		Stadium: El Teniente; Referee: Fernando Véjar

19 December 2020 25	Universidad Católica	0:0	Colo-Colo	Las Condes
18:00		Report		Stadium: San Carlos; Referee: Eduardo Gamboa

27 December 2020 26	Audax Italiano	2:2	Universidad Católica	La Florida
19:15	Holgado 62' (pen.); Montecinos 72'	Report	56', 90+6' Zampedri	Stadium: Bicentenario; Referee: Ángelo Hermosilla

4 January 2021 27	Universidad Católica	3:0	C.D. Huachipato	Las Condes
19:15	Valencia 69'; Montes 79'; Núñez 87'	Report		Stadium: San Carlos; Referee: Christian Rojas

7 January 2021 28	Deportes Iquique	0:1	Universidad Católica	Iquique
21:30		Report	69' Valencia	Stadium: Tierra de Campeones; Referee: César Deischler

10 January 2021 29	Universidad Católica	1:1	Curicó Unido	Las Condes
10:30	Zampedri 63'	Report	12' (pen.) Castro	Stadium: San Carlos; Referee: Rodrigo Carvajal

14 January 2021 30	Unión Española	1:1	Universidad Católica	Independencia
21:30	C. Palacios N. 54' (pen.)	Report	90+2' Zampedri	Stadium: Santa Laura; Referee: José Cabero

19 January 2021 31	Universidad Católica	1:1	Everton	Las Condes
19:15	Tapia 31'	Report	7' Leiva	Stadium: San Carlos; Referee: Héctor Jona

5 February 2021 32	Deportes La Serena	1:2	Universidad Católica	La Serena
17:00	Cornejo 54' (o.g.)	Report	25' Cornejo; 68' Lezcano	Stadium: La Portada; Referee: Eduardo Gamboa

10 February 2021 33	Universidad Católica	0:0	Unión La Calera	Las Condes
21:30		Report		Stadium: San Carlos; Referee: Roberto Tobar

14 February 2021 34	Universidad de Concepción	1:2	Universidad Católica	Concepción
10:30	Parot 43' (o.g.)	Report	71' Tapia; 82' Zampedri	Stadium: Ester Roa; Referee: Cristian Droguett

=== Supercopa de Chile ===
21 March 2021	Universidad Católica	4–2	Colo-Colo	Estadio Nacional Julio Martínez Prádanos, Santiago
18:00 UTC−3	Zampedri 63'; Tapia 67', 90'; Núñez 74'	Report	Morales 45+2'; Gil 52'	Attendance: 0 Referee: Roberto Tobar

=== Copa Libertadores ===
==== Group stage ====
The group stage draw was held on 17 December 2019, 20:30 PYST (UTC−3), at the CONMEBOL Convention Centre in Luque, Paraguay.

Pos	Team	Pld	W	D	L	GF	GA	GD	Pts	Qualification	GRE	INT	UCA	AME
1	(Brazil) Grêmio	6	3	2	1	6	3	+3	11	Round of 16	—	0–0	2–0	1–1
2	(Brazil) Internacional	6	2	2	2	8	6	+2	8	Round of 16	0–1	—	3–0	4–3
3	(Chile) Universidad Católica	6	2	1	3	5	8	−3	7	Copa Sudamericana	2–0	2–1	—	1–2
4	(Colombia) América de Cali	6	1	3	2	6	8	−2	6		0–2	0–0	1–1	—

Source: CONMEBOL
Rules for classification: 1) Points; 2) Goal difference; 3) Goals scored; 4) Away goals scored; 5) CONMEBOL ranking.

3 March 2020 1	Internacional (Brazil)	3–0	(Chile) Universidad Católica	Estádio Beira-Rio, Porto Alegre
19:15 UTC−3	Guerrero 62', 67'; Marcos Guilherme 71'	Report		Referee: Ángel Arteaga (Venezuela)

10 March 2020 2	Universidad Católica (Chile)	1–2	(Colombia) América de Cali	Estadio San Carlos de Apoquindo, Santiago
19:15 UTC−3	Núñez 45+1'	Report	Vergara 22'; Pisano 53'	Referee: Gustavo Tejera (Uruguay)

16 September 2020 3	Universidad Católica (Chile)	2–0	(Brazil) Grêmio	Estadio San Carlos de Apoquindo, Santiago
21:30 UTC−3	Zampedri 44'; Pinares 45+1'	Report		Attendance: 0 Referee: Darío Herrera (Argentina)

23 September 2020 4	América de Cali (Colombia)	1–1	(Chile) Universidad Católica	Estadio Pascual Guerrero, Cali
19:30 UTC−5	Vergara 4'	Report	Zampedri 34'	Attendance: 0 Referee: Jesús Valenzuela (Venezuela)

29 September 2020 5	Grêmio (Brazil)	2–0	(Chile) Universidad Católica	Arena do Grêmio, Porto Alegre
19:15 UTC−3	Pepê 47'; Rodrigues 63'	Report		Attendance: 0 Referee: Facundo Tello (Argentina)

22 October 2020 6	Universidad Católica (Chile)	2–1	(Brazil) Internacional	Estadio San Carlos de Apoquindo, Santiago
21:30 UTC−3	Zampedri 25', 89'	Report	D'Alessandro 24' (pen.)	Attendance: 0 Referee: Mauro Vigliano (Argentina)

=== Copa Sudamericana ===
==== Second stage ====
29 October 2020	Sol de América (Paraguay)	0–0	(Chile) Universidad Católica	Estadio Luis Alfonso Giagni, Villa Elisa
19:15 UTC−3		Report		Attendance: 0 Referee: Nicolás Lamolina (Argentina)

5 November 2020	Universidad Católica (Chile)	2–1	(Paraguay) Sol de América	Estadio San Carlos de Apoquindo, Santiago
21:30 UTC−3	Buonanotte 64'; Zampedri 81'	Report	Viera 57' (pen.)	Attendance: 0 Referee: Fernando Espinoza (Argentina)

==== Knockout phase ====
===== Round of 16 =====
26 November 2020	River Plate (Uruguay)	1–2	(Chile) Universidad Católica	Parque Alfredo Víctor Viera, Montevideo (Note: River Plate played their home match at Parque Alfredo Víctor Viera, Montevideo, instead of their regular stadium Parque Federico Omar Saroldi, Montevideo, which does not meet CONMEBOL requirements.)
19:15 UTC−3	Píriz 45+3'	Report	Zampedri 9'; Aued 73' (pen.)	Attendance: 0 Referee: José Méndez (Paraguay)

3 December 2020	Universidad Católica (Chile)	0–1	(Uruguay) River Plate	Estadio San Carlos de Apoquindo, Santiago
21:30 UTC−3		Report	Bonifazi 51'	Attendance: 0 Referee: Alexis Herrera (Venezuela)

===== Quarter-finals =====
8 December 2020	Vélez Sarsfield (Argentina)	1–2	(Chile) Universidad Católica	Estadio José Amalfitani, Buenos Aires
21:30 UTC−3	Lucero 90'	Report	Zampedri 45+5'; Puch 50'	Attendance: 0 Referee: Bruno Arleu (Brazil)

15 December 2020	Universidad Católica (Chile)	1–3	(Argentina) Vélez Sarsfield	Estadio San Carlos de Apoquindo, Santiago
21:30 UTC−3	Aued 68' (pen.)	Report	Tarragona 17' (pen.); Orellano 73'; Lucero 90+4'	Attendance: 0 Referee: Leodán González (Uruguay)

== Statistics ==
=== Squad statistics ===
No.	Pos	Nat	Player	Total		League		Supercopa de Chile		Copa Libertadores		Copa Sudamericana	
No.	Pos	Nat	Player	Apps	Goals	Apps	Goals	Apps	Goals	Apps	Goals	Apps	Goals
1	GK	(Argentina)	Matías Dituro	46	0	33	0	1	0	6	0	6	0
2	DF	(Argentina)	Germán Lanaro	25	0	12	0	0	0	8	0	5	0
4	DF	(Chile)	Carlos Salomón	8	0	7	0	1	0	0	0	0	0
5	DF	(Chile)	Valber Huerta	42	1	32	1	1	0	5	0	4	0
6	MF	(Chile)	Francisco Silva	6	0	4	0	0	0	1	0	1	0
7	DF	(Chile)	Tomás Asta-Buruaga	16	1	9	1	0	0	2	0	5	0
8	MF	(Chile)	Ignacio Saavedra	44	0	32	0	1	0	5	0	6	0
9	FW	(Argentina)	Fernando Zampedri	44	28	32	20	1	1	6	4	5	3
10	FW	(Chile)	Edson Puch	36	6	24	5	0	0	6	0	6	1
11	MF	(Argentina)	Luciano Aued	46	12	34	10	1	0	5	0	6	2
13	DF	(Argentina)	Benjamín Kuscevic †	9	1	7	1	0	0	2	0	0	0
13	DF	(Argentina)	Branco Ampuero	1	0	0	0	1	0	0	0	0	0
14	MF	(Chile)	César Pinares †	21	5	13	4	0	0	6	1	2	0
14	MF	(Chile)	Juan Fuentes	9	1	7	1	1	0	0	0	1	0
15	FW	(Argentina)	Gastón Lezcano	37	3	26	3	1	0	4	0	6	0
16	FW	(Chile)	César Munder	19	2	15	2	0	0	3	0	1	0
16	FW	(Chile)	Juan Leiva	1	0	0	0	1	0	0	0	0	0
17	GK	(Chile)	Cristopher Toselli	1	0	1	0	0	0	0	0	0	0
18	MF	(Argentina)	Diego Buonanotte	31	1	24	0	0	0	3	0	4	1
19	DF	(Chile)	José Pedro Fuenzalida	33	4	21	4	1	0	5	0	6	0
20	FW	(Chile)	Gonzalo Tapia	12	4	11	2	1	2	0	0	0	0
21	DF	(Chile)	Raimundo Rebolledo	41	0	29	0	1	0	5	0	6	0
23	DF	(Chile)	Juan Cornejo	20	1	17	1	0	0	1	0	2	0
24	DF	(Chile)	Alfonso Parot	33	0	23	0	1	0	3	0	6	0
26	MF	(Chile)	Marcelino Núñez	25	4	20	2	1	1	3	1	1	0
27	FW	(Chile)	Alexander Aravena	4	0	4	0	0	0	0	0	0	0
30	FW	(Chile)	Diego Valencia	40	4	30	4	1	0	4	0	5	0
33	DF	(Chile)	Aaron Astudillo	1	0	1	0	0	0	0	0	0	0
35	FW	(Chile)	Clemente Montes	9	1	9	1	0	0	0	0	0	0

Last updated: December 2020
Source: Soccerway

^{†} Player left Universidad Católica during the season

=== Goals ===
Rank	No.	Pos.	Nat.	Player	League	Copa Chile	Copa Libertadores	Copa Sudamericana	Total
1	9	FW	(Argentina)	Fernando Zampedri	20	1	4	3	28
2	11	MF	(Argentina)	Luciano Aued	10	0	0	2	12
3	10	FW	(Chile)	Edson Puch	5	0	0	1	6
4	16	MF	(Chile)	César Pinares	4	0	1	0	5
5	19	DF	(Chile)	José Pedro Fuenzalida	4	0	0	0	4
5	30	FW	(Chile)	Diego Valencia	4	0	0	0	4
5	26	MF	(Chile)	Marcelino Núñez	2	1	1	0	4
5	20	FW	(Chile)	Gonzalo Tapia	2	2	0	0	4
9	9	FW	(Argentina)	Gastón Lezcano	3	0	0	0	3
10	16	FW	(Chile)	César Munder	2	0	0	0	2
11	18	MF	(Argentina)	Diego Buonanotte	0	0	0	1	1
11	16	FW	(Chile)	Clemente Montes	1	0	0	0	1
11	23	DF	(Chile)	Juan Cornejo	1	0	0	0	1
11	7	DF	(Chile)	Tomás Asta-Buruaga	1	0	0	0	1
11	15	DF	(Chile)	Benjamín Kuscevic	1	0	0	0	1
11	14	MF	(Chile)	Juan Fuentes	1	0	0	0	1
11	5	DF	(Chile)	Valber Huerta	1	0	0	0	1
11				Own goal	3	0	0	0	3
Total					65	4	6	7	82

- Last updated: December 2020
- Source: Soccerway

=== Assists ===
Rank	No.	Pos.	Nat.	Player	League	Copa Chile	Supercopa	Copa Libertadores	Total
1	11	MF	(Argentina)	Luciano Aued	5	2	2	1	10
2	18	MF	(Argentina)	Diego Buonanotte	8	0	0	1	9
3	10	FW	(Chile)	Edson Puch	5	0	0	0	5
4	19	DF	(Chile)	José Pedro Fuenzalida	3	0	0	1	4
4	9	FW	(Argentina)	Gastón Lezcano	4	0	0	0	4
6	30	FW	(Chile)	Diego Valencia	1	2	0	0	3
7	16	MF	(Chile)	César Pinares	1	0	1	0	2
7	26	MF	(Chile)	Marcelino Núñez	2	0	0	0	2
7	16	FW	(Chile)	César Munder	2	0	0	0	2
7	16	DF	(Chile)	Clemente Montes	2	0	0	0	2
11	23	DF	(Chile)	Juan Cornejo	1	0	0	0	1
11	7	DF	(Chile)	Tomás Asta-Buruaga	1	0	0	0	1
11	24	DF	(Chile)	Alfonso Parot	1	0	0	0	1
11	8	MF	(Chile)	Ignacio Saavedra	1	0	0	0	1
11	1	GK	(Chile)	Matías Dituro	1	0	0	0	1
Total					38	4	3	3	48

- Last updated: December 2020
- Source: Soccerway

=== Clean sheets ===
Rank	No.	Pos.	Nat.	Name	League	Supercopa	Copa Libertadores	Copa Sudamericana	Total
1	1	GK	(Argentina)	Matías Dituro	11	0	1	1	13
Total					11	0	1	1	13

- Last updated: December 2020
- Source: Soccerway
