= 2019 Club Deportivo Universidad Católica season =

79th season in existence of Club Deportivo Universidad Católica

Universidad Católica
2019 season
- President: Juan Tagle
- Head coach: Gustavo Quinteros
- Stadium: San Carlos de Apoquindo
- League: 1st
- Copa Chile: Semifinals
- Supercopa: Winners
- Libertadores: Group stage
- Sudamericana: Second round
- Top goalscorer: League: Sebastián Sáez (11); All: José Pedro Fuenzalida (10)
- Biggest win: Universidad Católica 5–0 Palestino
- Biggest defeat: Universidad Católica 0–5 Independiente del Valle
Home colours	Away colours	Third colours

The 2019 Club Deportivo Universidad Católica season was the 79th season and the club's 45th consecutive season in the top flight of Chilean football. In addition to the domestic league, Universidad Católica participated in the season's editions of the Copa Chile, the Supercopa de Chile, the Copa Libertadores and the Copa Sudamericana

== Squad ==
No.	Player	Nationality	Position	Date of birth (age)	Year signed	Signed from
Goalkeepers
1	Matías Dituro	(Argentina)	GK	8 May 1987 (age 32)	2018	Bolívar
12	Marcelo Suárez	(Chile)	GK	21 August 2000 (age 19)	2018	Academy
17	Cristopher Toselli	(Chile)	GK	15 June 1988 (age 31)	2007	Academy
Defenders
2	Germán Lanaro	(Argentina)	CB	21 March 1986 (age 33)	2015	Palestino
5	Valber Huerta	(Chile)	CB	August 26, 1993 (age 26)	2019	Huachipato
13	Benjamín Kuscevic	(Chile)	CB	2 May 1996 (age 23)	2014	Academy
15	Yerco Oyanedel	(Chile)	LB / RB	19 September 2000 (age 19)	2019	Academy
21	Raimundo Rebolledo	(Chile)	RB / RWB	14 May 1997 (age 22)	2015	Academy
23	Juan Cornejo	(Chile)	LB / RB	27 February 1990 (age 29)	2019	León
24	Alfonso Parot	(Chile)	LB / RB	15 October 1989 (age 30)	2019	Rosario Central
29	Stefano Magnasco	(Chile)	RB / RWB	28 September 1992 (age 27)	2014	FC Groningen
Midfielders
6	César Fuentes	(Chile)	CM / DM	12 April 1993 (age 26)	2015	O'Higgins
8	Jaime Carreño	(Chile)	CM / DM	3 March 1997 (age 22)	2015	Academy
11	Luciano Aued	(Argentina)	AM / CM	1 March 1987 (age 32)	2017	Racing
14	César Pinares	(Chile)	AM / CM	23 May 1991 (age 28)	2019	Colo-Colo
18	Diego Buonanotte	(Argentina)	AM	19 April 1988 (age 31)	2016	AEK
20	Carlos Lobos	(Chile)	CM / DM	21 February 1997 (age 22)	2014	Academy
24	Ignacio Saavedra	(Chile)	CM / DM	12 January 1999 (age 20)	2018	Academy
33	Francisco Silva	(Chile)	CM / DM	11 February 1986 (age 33)	2019	Independiente
Forwards
7	Sebastián Sáez	(Argentina)	ST	24 January 1985 (age 34)	2018	Emirates
9	Duvier Riascos	(Colombia)	ST	26 June 1986 (age 33)	2019	Dalian Yifang
10	Edson Puch	(Chile)	LW / RW	9 April 1986 (age 33)	2019	Querétaro
16	Jeisson Vargas	(Chile)	LW / RW	15 September 1997 (age 22)	2019	Montreal Impact
19	José Pedro Fuenzalida (captain)	(Chile)	RB / RWB / RW	22 February 1985 (age 34)	2016	Boca Juniors
27	César Munder	(Cuba)	RW	7 January 2000 (age 19)	2018	Academy
30	Diego Valencia	(Chile)	ST / RW	14 January 2000 (age 19)	2018	Academy
33	David Henríquez	(Chile)	ST	21 February 1999 (age 20)	2017	Academy
Player(s) on transfers/loan during this season
4	Vicente Fernández	(Chile)	LB / RB	17 May 1999 (age 20)	2018	Academy

== Transfers ==
=== In ===
Date	Pos.	Name	From	Type	Ref.
1 January 2019	GK	(Argentina) Matías Dituro	(Bolivia) Bolivar	€875.000	
1 January 2019	GK	(Chile) Cristopher Toselli	Everton	End of loan	
15 January 2019	MF	(Chile) César Pinares	Colo-Colo	Free transfer	
31 January 2019	DF	(Chile) Valber Huerta	Huachipato	€440.000	
27 February 2019	FW	(Colombia) Duvier Riascos	(China) Dalian Yifang	Free transfer	
1 August 2019	DF	(Chile) Alfonso Parot	(Argentina) Rosario Central	€405.000	
2 August 2019	MF	(Chile) Francisco Silva	(Argentina) Independiente	Free transfer	

=== Out ===
Date	Pos.	Name	To	Type	Ref.
29 December 2018	MF	(Chile) Fabián Manzano	Unión La Calera	Contract terminated	
3 December 2018	DF	(Chile) Cristián Álvarez	-	Retirated	
31 December 2018	DF	(Chile) Branco Ampuero	Deportes Antofagasta	End of loan	
31 December 2018	FW	(Chile) Marcos Bolados	Colo-Colo	End of loan	
31 December 2018	FW	(Chile) Andrés Vilches	Colo-Colo	End of loan	
14 February 2018	MF	(Chile) Lukas Soza	Deportes Copiapó	Contract terminated	
22 February 2018	MF	(Chile) Gonzalo Jara	Magallanes	Contract terminated	
3 January 2019	FW	(Chile) David Llanos	Unión Española	Contract terminated	
10 January 2019	FW	(Chile) José Luis Muñoz	O'Higgins	Contract terminated	
11 February 2019	DF	(Argentina) Germán Voboril	Universidad de Concepción	Contract terminated	
1 March 2019	GK	(Chile) Álvaro Ogalde	Lautaro de Buin	Contract terminated	
7 March 2019	MF	(Chile) Manuel Reyes	Lautaro de Buin	Contract terminated	

=== Loans in ===
Date	Position	Name	From	End date	Ref.
27 December 2018	DF	(Chile) Juan Cornejo	(Mexico) León	End of season	
11 January 2019	FW	(Chile) Edson Puch	(Mexico) Querétaro	End of season	
8 February 2019	FW	(Chile) Jeisson Vargas	(Canada) Montreal Impact	End of season	

=== Loans out ===
Date	Position	Name	From	End date	Ref.
1 January 2019	FW	(Chile) Matías Rosas	Deportes Puerto Montt	End of season	
4 January 2019	MF	(Chile) Andrés Souper	Deportes Puerto Montt	End of season	
11 January 2019	GK	(Chile) Miguel Vargas	Cobresal	End of season	
15 January 2019	FW	(Chile) Sebastián Pérez	Ñublense	End of season	
31 January 2019	FW	(Chile) Diego Vallejos	Curicó Unido	End of season	
14 March 2019	MF	(Chile) Kevin Medel	Deportes La Serena	End of season	
1 July 2019	DF	(Chile) Benjamin Vidal	Coquimbo Unido	End of season	
1 July 2019	MF	(Chile) Diego Rojas	Unión La Calera	End of season	
26 August 2019	DF	(Chile) Vicente Fernández	Santiago Morning	End of season	
3 September 2019	MF	(Chile) Juan Carlos Espinoza	Audax Italiano	End of season	

=== New contracts ===
Date	Pos.	Name	Contract length	Contract ends	Ref.
1 January 2019	GK	(Argentina) Matías Dituro	3-year	2022	
8 October 2019	GK	(Chile) Vicente Bernedo	3-year	2022	
8 October 2019	DF	(Chile) Cristóbal Finch	3-year	2022	
8 October 2019	DF	(Chile) Patricio Flores	3-year	2022	
8 October 2019	DF	(Chile) Marcelino Núñez	3-year	2022	
8 October 2019	FW	(Chile) Gonzalo Tapia	3-year	2022	
8 October 2019	FW	(Chile) Clemente Montes	3-year	2022	

== Competitions ==
=== Overview ===
Competition	First match	Last match	Starting round	Final position	Record							
Competition	First match	Last match	Starting round	Final position	Pld	W	D	L	GF	GA	GD	Win %
League	15 February 2019	2 December 2019	Matchday 1	Winners	24	16	5	3	44	14	+30	66.67
Copa Chile	8 June 2019	18 January 2019	Semifinals	Second round	7	4	1	2	11	6	+5	57.14
Supercopa de Chile	23 March 2019	23 March 2019	Final	Winners	1	1	0	0	5	0	+5	100.00
Copa Libertadores	5 March 2019	8 May 2019	Group stage	Group stage	6	2	1	3	7	11	−4	33.33
Copa Sudamericana	23 May 2019	30 May 2019	Second round	Second round	2	1	0	1	3	7	−4	50.00
Total					40	24	7	9	70	38	+32	60.00

Source: Soccerway

=== Primera Division ===
==== League table ====
Pos	Team	Pld	W	D	L	GF	GA	GD	Pts	Qualification
1	Universidad Católica (C)	24	16	5	3	44	14	+30	53	Qualification for Copa Libertadores group stage
2	Colo-Colo	24	11	7	6	37	30	+7	40	Qualification for Copa Libertadores group stage
3	Palestino	24	10	8	6	42	31	+11	38	Qualification for Copa Libertadores second stage
4	Unión La Calera	25	9	10	6	29	23	+6	37	Qualification for Copa Sudamericana first stage
5	Coquimbo Unido	24	8	10	6	29	27	+2	34	Qualification for Copa Sudamericana first stage

Source: ANFP, Soccerway
Rules for classification: 1) Points, 2) Playoff game (only if needed to decide championship between two teams), 3) Goal difference, 4) Matches won, 5) Goals for, 6) Away goals for, 7) Red cards, 8) Yellow cards, 9) Drawing of lots.
(C) Champions

==== Results summary ====
Overall								Home						Away					
Pld	W	D	L	GF	GA	GD	Pts	W	D	L	GF	GA	GD	W	D	L	GF	GA	GD
24	16	5	3	44	14	+30	53	6	4	1	20	4	+16	10	1	2	24	10	+14

Source: Primera Division

==== Results by round ====
Round	1	2	3	4	5	6	7	8	9	10	11	12	13	14	15	16	17	18	19	20	21	22	23	24
Ground	A	H	A	H	A	H	A	H	A	H	A	A	H	H	A	A	H	H	A	A	H	A	H	A
Result	W	L	W	W	W	D	W	W	W	W	L	W	W	D	W	W	D	W	D	W	D	W	W	D
Position	4	6	4	4	1	4	2	1	1	1	1	1	1	1	1	1	1	1	1	1	1	1	1	1

Source: Primera Division
A = Away; H = Home; W = Win; D = Draw; L = Loss; F = Free round

==== Matches ====
15 February 2019 1	Coquimbo Unido	1:2	Universidad Católica	Coquimbo
20:00	Soto 38'	Report	14', 22' Valencia	Stadium: Francisco Sánchez; Attendance: 14.029; Referee: Francisco Gilabert

24 February 2019 2	Universidad Católica	0:1	Deportes Iquique	Las Condes
20:00		Report	77' Pernía	Stadium: San Carlos; Attendance: 10.525; Referee: Piero Maza

1 March 2019 3	Audax Italiano	0:2	Universidad Católica	La Florida
21:00		Report	67' Puch; 90+5' Lobos	Stadium: Bicentenario; Attendance: 6.710; Referee: Eduardo Gamboa

9 March 2019 4	Universidad Católica	1:0	Unión La Calera	Las Condes
20:00	Lobos 87'	Report		Stadium: San Carlos; Attendance: 10.226; Referee: Felipe González

17 March 2019 5	Colo-Colo	2:3	Universidad Católica	Macul
12:00	Vilches 73', 85'	Report	14' Fuenzalida; 60', 70' Sáez	Stadium: Monumental; Attendance: 36.172; Referee: Piero Maza

31 March 2019 6	Universidad Católica	0:0	Curicó Unido	Las Condes
18:00		Report		Stadium: San Carlos; Attendance: 11.056; Referee: César Deischler

7 April 2019 7	Everton	1:2	Universidad Católica	Viña del Mar
15:00	Cerato 38' (pen.)	Report	35' Carreño; 47' Riascos	Stadium: Sausalito; Attendance: 7.813; Referee: Cristián Garay

14 April 2019 8	Universidad Católica	4:0	Universidad de Chile	Las Condes
12:00	Fuenzalida 46'; Puch 61'; Riascos 68'; Aued 86'	Report		Stadium: San Carlos; Attendance: 12.614; Referee: Roberto Tobar

20 April 2019 9	Palestino	1:2	Universidad Católica	La Cisterna
15:00	Passerini 65' (pen.)	Report	9' Munder; 69' (pen.) Aued	Stadium: Municipal; Attendance: 4.624; Referee: Piero Maza

28 April 2019 10	Universidad Católica	3:1	Universidad de Concepción	Las Condes
15:00	Fuenzalida 18'; Huerta 77'; Valencia 79'	Report	31' Cordero	Stadium: San Carlos; Attendance: 10.885; Referee: Eduardo Gamboa

4 May 2019 11	O'Higgins F.C.	1:0	Universidad Católica	Rancagua
15:30	Salazar 36'	Report		Stadium: El Teniente; Attendance: 7.584; Referee: Julio Bascuñán

12 May 2019 12	Cobresal	0:2	Universidad Católica	El Salvador
15:00		Report	37' Puch; 82' (pen.) Aued	Stadium: El Cobre; Attendance: 1.512; Referee: César Deischler

17 May 2019 13	Universidad Católica	5:1	Deportes Antofagasta	Las Condes
20:30	Riascos 33'; Aued 56'; Pinares 83'; Buonanotte 87'; Fuenzalida 90+3'	Report	36' J. Flores	Stadium: San Carlos; Attendance: 9.182; Referee: Cristian Garay

11 June 2019 14	Universidad Católica	0:0	Unión Española	Las Condes
20:30		Report		Stadium: San Carlos; Attendance: 7.714; Referee: Eduardo Gamboa

28 July 2019 15	C.D. Huachipato	0:1	Universidad Católica	Talcahuano
15:00		Report	63' Puch	Stadium: Estadio CAP; Attendance: 3.372; Referee: Eduardo Gamboa

4 August 2019 16	Universidad de Concepción	0:3	Universidad Católica	Concepción
12:30		Report	33', 60' Fuenzalida; 84' Sáez	Stadium: Ester Roa; Attendance: 9.693; Referee: Roberto Tobar

11 August 2019 17	Universidad Católica	1:1	Coquimbo Unido	Las Condes
17:30	Fuenzalida 25'	Report	60' (ag.) Huerta	Stadium: San Carlos; Attendance: 10.306; Referee: Julio Bascuñán

17 August 2019 18	Universidad Católica	1:0	Everton	Las Condes
17:30	Aued 59'	Report		Stadium: San Carlos; Attendance: 9.354; Referee: José Cabero

25 August 2019 19	Universidad de Chile	1:1	Universidad Católica	Ñuñoa
15:00	Henríquez 69'	Report	30' Lanaro	Stadium: Nacional; Attendance: 39.051; Referee: Julio Bascuñán

1 September 2019 20	Deportes Antofagasta	1:2	Universidad Católica	Antofagasta
15:00	Flores 40'	Report	8' Pinares; 88' Valencia	Stadium: Calvo y Bascuñán; Attendance: 5.127; Referee: Roberto Tobar

15 September 2019 21	Universidad Católica	0:0	O'Higgins F.C.	Las Condes
17:30		Report		Stadium: San Carlos; Attendance: 10.267; Referee: José Cabero

28 September 2019 22	Curicó Unido	1:4	Universidad Católica	Curicó
17:30	Vargas 9'	Report	14', 36' Fuenzalida; 47', 77' Pinares	Stadium: La Granja; Attendance: 5.073; Referee: Juan Lara

6 October 2019 23	Universidad Católica	5:0	Cobresal	Las Condes
17:30	Sáez 10'; Puch 27'; Pinares 54'; Buonanotte 73'; Fuenzalida 90'	Report		Stadium: San Carlos; Attendance: 10.438; Referee: Francisco Gilabert

16 October 2019 24	Unión La Calera	1:0	Universidad Católica	La Calera
18:30	Monreal 48'	Report		Stadium: Nicolás Chahuán; Attendance: 3.266; Referee: Cristián Garay

=== Copa Chile ===
==== Second round ====
8 June 2019	Deportes La Serena	1–0	Universidad Católica	La Serena
20:00	Huerta 42' (o.g.)	Report		Stadium: La Portada; Attendance: 5,032; Referee: Francisco Gilabert

9 July 2019	Universidad Católica	2–1 (6–5 p)	Deportes La Serena	Las Condes, Santiago
20:00	Sáez 39', 65'	Report	Ruiz 78'	Stadium: San Carlos de Apoquindo; Referee: Felipe González
	Penalties
	Aued (penalty scored); Buonanotte (penalty scored); Fuenzalida (penalty scored); Puch (penalty scored); Pinares (penalty scored); Dituro (penalty scored)		(penalty scored) Medel; (penalty scored) Ruiz; (penalty scored) Gómez; (penalty scored) Hormazábal; (penalty scored) J. Silva; (penalty missed) Rivera

==== Knockout phase ====
===== Round of 16 =====
16 July 2019	Santiago Morning	0–2	Universidad Católica	Ñuñoa, Santiago
16:00		Report	Kuscevic 85'; Huerta 90+4'	Stadium: Nacional Julio Martínez Prádanos; Referee: Piero Maza

7 August 2019	Universidad Católica	3–1	Santiago Morning	Las Condes, Santiago
20:00	Vargas 3'; Sáez 85'; Buonanotte 90+1'	Report	Gómez 22'	Stadium: San Carlos de Apoquindo; Referee: Ángelo Hermosilla
Note: The match was originally scheduled on 21 June at 18:30 but was suspended due to bad weather and the poor state of the pitch at Estadio San Carlos de Apoquindo. It was rescheduled to 7 August at 20:00.

===== Quarterfinals =====
8 September 2019	Unión La Calera	2–1	Universidad Católica	La Calera
15:00	Leiva 1'; Larrondo 8'	Report	Sáez 38'	Stadium: Municipal Nicolás Chahuán Nazar; Referee: César Deischler

12 October 2019	Universidad Católica	2–0	Unión La Calera	Las Condes, Santiago
20:15	Aued 38' (pen.); Puch 87'	Report		Stadium: San Carlos de Apoquindo; Referee: Roberto Tobar

===== Semifinals =====
With the ANFP's Council of Presidents voting to conclude the 2019 season on 29 November 2019, it was decided that both the semifinals and final would be single-legged series to be played in January 2020.

18 January 2020	Universidad Católica	1–1 (2–4 p)	Colo-Colo	Temuco
18:00	Aued 71' (pen.)	Report	Valencia 90+4' (pen.)	Stadium: Municipal Germán Becker; Attendance: 13,022; Referee: Roberto Tobar
	Penalties
	Aued (penalty missed); Fuenzalida (penalty scored); Puch (penalty missed); Zampedri (penalty scored)		(penalty scored) Fernández; (penalty scored) Barroso; (penalty scored) Insaurralde; (penalty scored) Valencia

=== Supercopa de Chile ===
23 March 2019	Universidad Católica	5–0	Palestino	Estadio Sausalito, Viña del Mar
18:00	Kuscevic 39'; Pinares 43'; Sáez 58'; Valencia 89'; Buonanotte 90+1'	Report		Attendance: 14,914; Referee: Roberto Tobar

=== Copa Libertadores ===
==== Group stage ====
The group stage draw was held on 17 December 2018, 20:30 PYST (UTC−3), at the CONMEBOL Convention Centre in Luque, Paraguay.

Pos	Team	Pld	W	D	L	GF	GA	GD	Pts	Qualification	LIB	GRE	UCA	ROS
1	(Paraguay) Libertad	6	4	0	2	11	7	+4	12	Round of 16	—	0–2	4–1	2–0
2	(Brazil) Grêmio	6	3	1	2	8	4	+4	10	Round of 16	0–1	—	2–0	3–1
3	(Chile) Universidad Católica	6	2	1	3	7	11	−4	7	Copa Sudamericana	2–3	1–0	—	2–1
4	(Argentina) Rosario Central	6	1	2	3	6	10	−4	5		2–1	1–1	1–1	—

Source: CONMEBOL
Rules for classification: Group stage tiebreakers

5 March 2019 1	Libertad (Paraguay)	4–1	(Chile) Universidad Católica	Estadio Defensores del Chaco, Asunción (Note: Libertad played their home matches at Estadio Defensores del Chaco, Asunción, instead of their regular stadium Estadio Dr. Nicolás Léoz, Asunción.)
21:30 UTC−3	Martínez 1', 3'; Bareiro 73'; Cougo 90+3'	Report	Aued 37' (pen.)	Referee: Jesús Valenzuela (Venezuela)

13 March 2019 2	Universidad Católica (Chile)	2–1	(Argentina) Rosario Central	Estadio San Carlos de Apoquindo, Santiago
21:30 UTC−3	Puch 27'; Aued 90+5' (pen.)	Report	Vergara 90+1'	Referee: Víctor Carrillo (Peru)

4 April 2019 3	Universidad Católica (Chile)	1–0	(Brazil) Grêmio	Estadio San Carlos de Apoquindo, Santiago
19:00 UTC−3	Sáez 16'	Report		Referee: Wilmar Roldán (Colombia)

10 April 2019 4	Universidad Católica (Chile)	2–3	(Paraguay) Libertad	Estadio San Carlos de Apoquindo, Santiago
20:30 UTC−4	Puch 7'; Sáez 90+4'	Report	Recalde 43'; Cardozo 45'; Cardozo Lucena 83'	Referee: Gery Vargas (Bolivia)

24 April 2019 5	Rosario Central (Argentina)	1–1	(Chile) Universidad Católica	Estadio Gigante de Arroyito, Rosario
19:15 UTC−3	Fuenzalida 79' (o.g.)	Report	Fuentes 23'	Referee: Esteban Ostojich (Uruguay)

8 May 2019 6	Grêmio (Brazil)	2–0	(Chile) Universidad Católica	Arena do Grêmio, Porto Alegre
19:15 UTC−3	Alisson 22'; Thaciano 76'	Report		Referee: Néstor Pitana (Argentina)

=== Copa Sudamericana ===
==== Second stage ====
23 May 2019	Independiente del Valle (Ecuador)	5–0	(Chile) Universidad Católica	Estadio Olímpico Atahualpa, Quito (Note: Independiente del Valle played their home match at Estadio Olímpico Atahualpa, Quito, instead of their regular stadium Estadio Rumiñahui, Sangolquí.)
19:30 UTC−5	Cabeza 1', 12'; Pellerano 10' (pen.); Landázuri 20'; Dájome 58'	Report		Referee: Andrés Cunha (Uruguay)

30 May 2019	Universidad Católica (Chile)	3–2	(Ecuador) Independiente del Valle	Estadio San Carlos de Apoquindo, Santiago
20:30 UTC−4	Cornejo 23'; Riascos 32'; Preciado 73' (o.g.)	Report	Franco 3'; Dájome 85'	Referee: Carlos Herrera (Colombia)

== Statistics ==
=== Squad statistics ===
No.	Pos	Nat	Player	Total		League		National cups		Copa Libertadores		Copa Sudamericana	
No.	Pos	Nat	Player	Apps	Goals	Apps	Goals	Apps	Goals	Apps	Goals	Apps	Goals
1	GK	(Argentina)	Matías Dituro	33	0	20	0	5	0	6	0	2	0
2	DF	(Argentina)	Germán Lanaro	29	2	19	1	4	0	4	0	2	1
4	FW	(Chile)	Vicente Fernández †	1	0	0	0	1	0	0	0	0	0
5	DF	(Chile)	Valber Huerta	33	2	20	1	8	1	3	0	2	0
6	MF	(Chile)	César Fuentes	30	1	17	0	6	0	6	1	1	0
6	MF	(Chile)	Francisco Silva	6	0	4	0	2	0	0	0	0	0
7	FW	(Chile)	Sebastián Sáez	26	11	15	4	6	5	5	2	0	0
8	MF	(Chile)	Jaime Carreño	8	1	5	1	2	0	1	0	0	0
8	MF	(Chile)	Ignacio Saavedra	15	0	9	0	4	0	1	0	1	0
9	FW	(Colombia)	Duvier Riascos	20	3	9	3	4	0	5	0	2	0
9	FW	(Argentina)	Fernando Zampedri	1	0	0	0	1	0	0	0	0	0
10	FW	(Chile)	Edson Puch	30	8	17	5	6	1	6	2	1	0
11	MF	(Argentina)	Luciano Aued	38	9	23	5	7	2	6	2	2	0
13	DF	(Argentina)	Benjamín Kuscevic	25	2	13	0	6	2	6	0	0	0
14	MF	(Chile)	César Pinares	34	6	20	5	6	1	6	0	2	0
15	FW	(Chile)	Yerco Oyanedel	1	0	0	0	1	0	0	0	0	0
15	FW	(Chile)	Gastón Lezcano	1	0	0	0	1	0	0	0	0	0
16	FW	(Chile)	Jeisson Vargas	7	1	3	0	2	1	0	0	2	0
17	GK	(Chile)	Cristopher Toselli	7	0	4	0	3	0	0	0	0	0
18	MF	(Argentina)	Diego Buonanotte	31	4	21	2	6	2	2	0	2	0
19	DF	(Chile)	José Pedro Fuenzalida	33	10	21	10	4	0	6	0	2	0
20	FW	(Chile)	César Munder	13	1	11	1	2	0	0	0	0	0
20	FW	(Chile)	Carlos Lobos	23	2	14	2	4	0	4	0	1	0
21	DF	(Chile)	Raimundo Rebolledo	21	0	15	0	3	0	2	0	1	0
23	DF	(Chile)	Juan Cornejo	27	1	15	0	5	0	5	0	2	1
24	DF	(Chile)	Alfonso Parot	7	0	5	0	2	0	0	0	0	0
29	DF	(Chile)	Stefano Magnasco	26	0	14	0	6	0	5	0	1	0
30	FW	(Chile)	Diego Valencia	25	5	17	4	3	1	3	0	2	0
33	FW	(Chile)	David Henríquez	3	0	2	0	1	0	0	0	0	0

Last updated: December 2019
Source: Soccerway

^{†} Player left Universidad Católica during the season

=== Goals ===
Rank	No.	Pos.	Nat.	Player	League	Copa Chile	Supercopa	Copa Libertadores	Copa Sudamericana	Total
1	7	MF	(Argentina)	Sebastián Sáez	4	4	1	2	0	11
2	19	DF	(Chile)	José Pedro Fuenzalida	10	0	0	0	0	10
3	11	MF	(Argentina)	Luciano Aued	5	2	0	2	0	9
4	10	FW	(Chile)	Edson Puch	5	1	0	2	0	8
5	16	MF	(Chile)	César Pinares	5	0	1	0	0	6
6	30	FW	(Chile)	Diego Valencia	4	0	1	0	0	5
7	18	MF	(Argentina)	Diego Buonanotte	2	1	1	0	0	4
8	9	FW	(Colombia)	Duvier Riascos	3	0	0	0	0	3
9	20	FW	(Chile)	Carlos Lobos	2	0	0	0	0	2
9	2	DF	(Chile)	Germán Lanaro	1	0	0	0	1	2
9	5	DF	(Chile)	Valber Huerta	1	1	0	0	0	2
9	15	DF	(Chile)	Benjamín Kuscevic	0	1	1	0	0	2
13	14	FW	(Chile)	Jeisson Vargas	0	1	0	0	0	1
13	6	MF	(Chile)	César Fuentes	0	0	0	1	0	1
13	16	FW	(Chile)	César Munder	1	0	0	0	0	1
13	8	DF	(Chile)	Jaime Carreño	1	0	0	0	0	1
13	23	MF	(Chile)	Juan Cornejo	0	0	0	0	1	1
13				Own goal	1	0	0	0	0	1
Total					44	11	5	7	3	70

- Last updated: December 2019
- Source: Soccerway

=== Assists ===
Rank	No.	Pos.	Nat.	Player	League	Copa Chile	Supercopa	Copa Libertadores	Copa Sudamericana	total
1	19	DF	(Chile)	José Pedro Fuenzalida	6	0	0	0	2	8
2	11	MF	(Argentina)	Luciano Aued	5	0	1	1	0	7
3	19	DF	(Chile)	Juan Cornejo	4	0	1	0	0	5
4	16	MF	(Chile)	César Pinares	4	0	0	0	0	4
5	7	FW	(Argentina)	Sebastián Sáez	2	0	0	0	0	2
5	10	FW	(Chile)	Edson Puch	2	0	0	0	0	2
5	30	FW	(Chile)	Diego Valencia	2	0	0	0	0	2
5	20	MF	(Chile)	Carlos Lobos	2	0	0	0	0	2
5	29	DF	(Chile)	Stefano Magnasco	0	1	0	1	0	2
10	18	MF	(Argentina)	Diego Buonanotte	0	0	1	0	0	1
10	9	FW	(Colombia)	Duvier Riascos	1	0	0	0	0	1
10	2	DF	(Chile)	Germán Lanaro	1	0	0	0	0	1
10	14	FW	(Chile)	Jeisson Vargas	1	0	0	0	0	1
10	6	MF	(Chile)	César Fuentes	1	0	0	0	0	1
Total					31	1	3	2	2	39

- Last updated: December 2019
- Source: Soccerway

=== Clean sheets ===
Rank	No.	Pos.	Nat.	Name	League	Copa Chile	Supercopa	Copa Libertadores	Copa Sudamericana	Total
1	1	GK	(Argentina)	Matías Dituro	9	2	1	1	0	13
2	17	GK	(Chile)	Cristopher Toselli	2	0	0	0	0	2
Total					11	2	1	1	0	15

*Last updated: December 2019
- Source: Soccerway
