= Oyanedel =

Oyanedel is a surname. Notable people with the surname include:

- Abraham Oyanedel (1874–1954), Chilean president of the Supreme Court and acting president of Chile
- Yerco Oyanedel (born 2000), Chilean footballer
