= Matías Dituro =

Argentine footballer (born 1987)

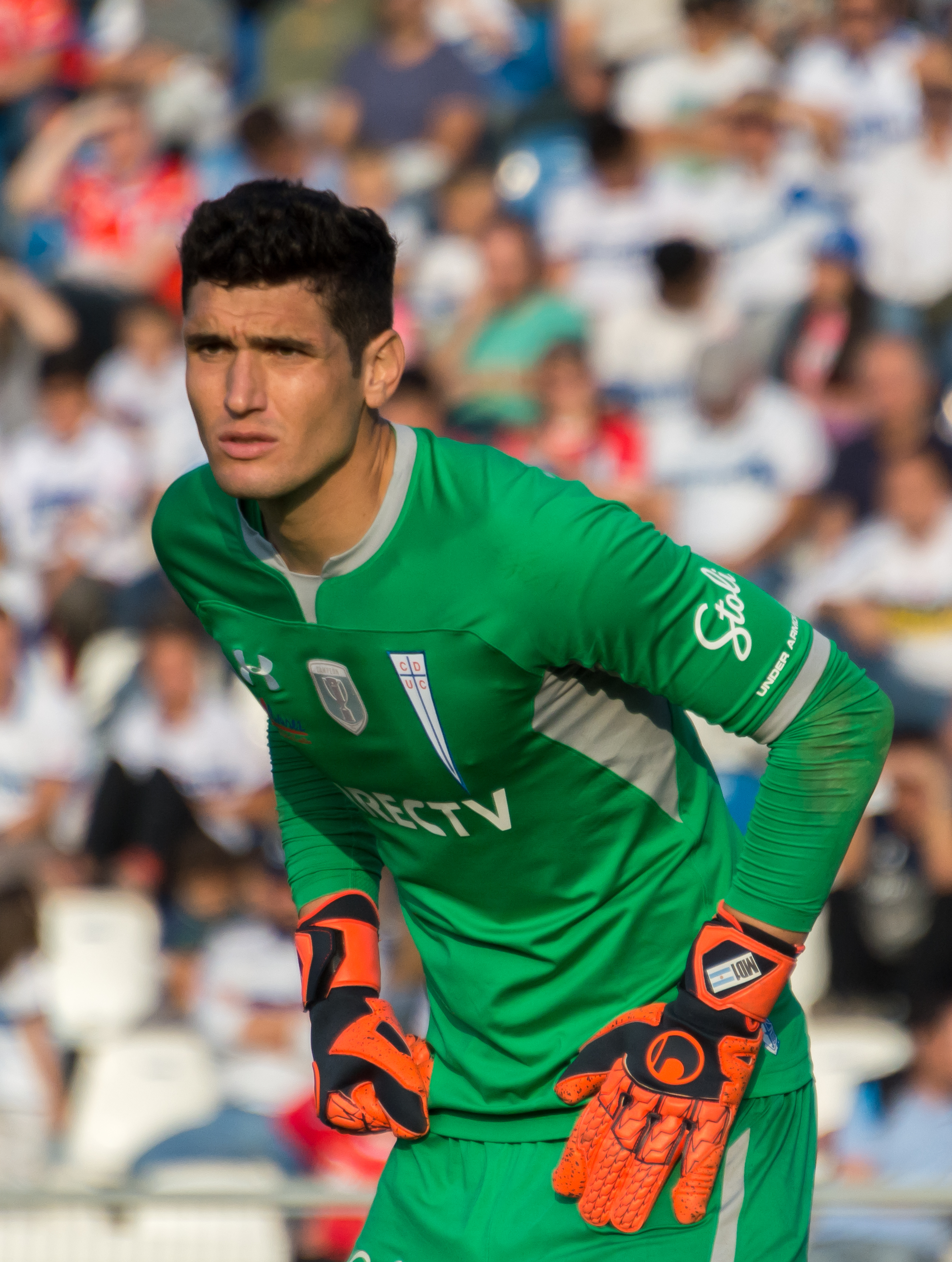
- Dituro with Universidad Católica in 2019

Personal information
- Full name: Matías Ezequiel Dituro Curto
- Date of birth: 8 May 1987 (age 39)
- Place of birth: Bigand, Argentina
- Height: 1.91 m (6 ft 3 in)
- Position: Goalkeeper

Team information
- Current team: Elche
- Number: 1

Youth career
- Independiente

Senior career*
Years	Team	Apps	(Gls)
2007–2009	Independiente	0	(0)
2008	→ Almagro (loan)	0	(0)
2010	CNI	37	(0)
2011	Alavés	8	(0)
2011–2012	Celta B	15	(0)
2012	Celta	0	(0)
2012–2013	Douglas Haig	3	(0)
2013	Guillermo Brown	13	(0)
2014	Aurora	19	(0)
2014–2015	Jorge Wilstermann	43	(4)
2015–2016	Deportes Antofagasta	44	(1)
2017–2018	Bolívar	42	(1)
2018	→ Universidad Católica	30	(0)
2019–2023	Universidad Católica	90	(0)
2021–2022	→ Celta (loan)	38	(0)
2023	Fatih Karagümrük	11	(0)
2024–	Elche	81	(0)
- * Club domestic league appearances and goals as of 23 May 2026

Matías Ezequiel Dituro Curto (born 8 May 1987) is an Argentine-Chilean professional footballer who plays as a goalkeeper for La Liga club Elche.

He played top-flight football in Peru with CNI; Bolivia with Club Aurora, Jorge Wilstermann and Bolívar; Chile with Antofagasta and Universidad Católica; and in Spain with Celta Vigo.

As a goalkeeper, Dituro scored six professional goals. Four were penalty kicks, one a long kick from his own penalty area, and the sixth a header.

== Club career ==
=== Early years ===
Born in Bigand in the Caseros Department of Santa Fe Province, Dituro began his career with Independiente and had a loan with Almagro. After playing for CNI in the Peruvian Primera División in 2010, he signed for Alavés of the Spanish Segunda División B in January 2011. That August, he moved to Celta Vigo on a one-year deal with the option of one more, being assigned to the B-team.

Dituro's place at third-tier Celta B was taken by youngster Rubén Blanco halfway through the season. He had one call-up for the first team in Segunda División in the penultimate game of the season on 27 May 2012, a 2–1 win at Gimnàstic de Tarragona. He returned to his homeland later that year, at Douglas Haig in the Primera B Nacional, and Guillermo Brown of the Torneo Federal A in July 2013.

=== Bolivia and Chile ===
Dituro then moved to the Bolivian Primera División, with Cochabamba-based Aurora and Jorge Wilstermann. He scored four penalties for the latter.

Following a spell in the Chilean Primera División with Antofagasta, Dituro returned to Bolivia in January 2017 with Bolívar. On 23 April, he scored from his own goal at the end of a 3–1 home win over San José. He went back to Chile in January 2018 on loan to Universidad Católica for a US$250,000 fee.

=== Celta de Vigo ===
On 8 July 2021, Dituro joined La Liga side Celta de Vigo on loan for the 2021–22 season with an option to make the deal permanent. He was signed by compatriot Eduardo Coudet to replace the retired Sergio Álvarez, and started ahead of Blanco who was still at the club. In his second match for Celta on 23 August, he saved a penalty from Rubén García and kept a clean sheet as the club drew 0–0 with Osasuna.

=== Elche ===
After a stint with Turkish club Fatih Karagümrük, he returned to Spain and joined Elche in 2024. On 4 July 2025, he renewed his contract for a further year.

== Personal life ==
In February 2023, he got Chilean nationality by residence.

== Career statistics ==
=== Club ===
As of match played 1 November 2026

Appearances and goals by club, season and competition
Club	Season	League			National Cup		Continental		Other		Total	
Club	Season	Division	Apps	Goals	Apps	Goals	Apps	Goals	Apps	Goals	Apps	Goals
CNI	2010	Peruvian Segunda División	37	0	—		—		—		37	0
Deportivo Alavés	2010–11	Segunda División B	12	0	—		—		—		12	0
Celta Vigo B	2011–12	Segunda División B	15	0	—		—		—		15	0
Douglas Haig	2012–13	Primera B Nacional	3	0	1	0	—		—		4	0
Guillermo Brown	2013	Primera C	13	0	—		—		—		13	0
Aurora	2013–14	Bolivian Primera División	19	0	3	0	—		—		22	0
Jorge Wilstermann	2014–15	Bolivian Primera División	43	4	—		2 (Note: Appearance(s) in the Copa Sudamericana)	0	—		45	4
Deportes Antofagasta	2015–16	Chilean Primera División	31	1	4	0	—		—		35	1
Deportes Antofagasta	2016–17	Chilean Primera División	13	0	2	0	—		—		15	0
Deportes Antofagasta	Total		44	1	6	0	0	0	—		50	1
Bolívar	2016–17	Bolivian Primera División	42	1	—		4	0	—		46	1
Universidad Católica(loan)	2018	Chilean Primera División	30	0	2	0	—		—		32	0
Universidad Católica	2019	Chilean Primera División	20	0	4	0	8 (Note: 6 appearances in the Copa Libertadores, 2 in the Copa Sudamericana)	0	1 (Note: Appearance(s) in the Supercopa de Chile)	0	33	0
Universidad Católica	2020	Chilean Primera División	33	0	—		12 (Note: 6 appearances in the Copa Libertadores, 6 in the Copa Sudamericana)	0	1	0	46	0
Universidad Católica	2021	Chilean Primera División	7	0	—		5 (Note: Appearance(s) in the Copa Libertadores)	0	—		12	0
Universidad Católica	2022	Chilean Primera División	15	0	3	0	—		—		18	0
Universidad Católica	2023	Chilean Primera División	15	0	2	0	1	0	—		18	0
Universidad Católica	Total		90	0	9	0	26	0	2	0	127	0
Celta de Vigo (loan)	2021–22	La Liga	38	0	1	0	—		—		39	0
Fatih Karagümrük	2023–24	Süper Lig	11	0	0	0	—		—		11	0
Elche	2023–24	Segunda División	21	0	—		—		—		21	0
Elche	2024–25	Segunda División	38	0	0	0	—		—		38	0
Elche	2025–26	La Liga	22	0	4	0	—		—		26	0
Elche	2026–27	La Liga	11	0	0	0	—		—		11	0
Elche	Total		92	0	4	0	—		—		96	0
Career total			489	6	26	0	32	0	2	0	549	6

== 1Honours ==
Bolivar

- Primera División de Bolivia: 2017–AP, 2017–CL

Universidad Católica

- Primera División de Chile: 2018, 2019, 2020, 2021
- Supercopa de Chile: 2019, 2020

Individual

- Primera División's El Gráfico Golden Ball: 2020
- Ricardo Zamora Trophy (Segunda División): 2024–25
