= Enzo Ferrario =

Chilean footballer (born 2000)

Personal information
- Full name: Enzo Nicolás Ferrario Arguello
- Date of birth: 3 March 2000 (age 26)
- Place of birth: Chicago, Illinois, United States
- Height: 1.82 m (6 ft 0 in)
- Position: Centre-back

Team information
- Current team: Audax Italiano

Youth career
- Barnechea
- 2016–2019: Universidad Católica

Senior career*
Years	Team	Apps	(Gls)
2019–2022	Universidad Católica	0	(0)
2020–2022	→ Deportes La Serena (loan)	50	(0)
2023–2024	Unión La Calera	32	(1)
2025–	Audax Italiano	0	(0)
- * Club domestic league appearances and goals as of 24 December 2024 ‡ National team caps and goals as of 30 May 2019

Enzo Nicolás Ferrario Arguello (born 3 March 2000) is an American-born Chilean professional footballer who plays as a centre back for Chilean club Audax Italiano.

== Career ==
Ferrario came to the Universidad Católica youth system in 2016 and made his professional debut the year 2020 in the match against Everton in Estadio Sausalito, on the following date. From 2020 to 2022, he was loaned out to Deportes La Serena until the end of his contract.

In 2023, Ferrario signed with Unión La Calera. He switched to Audax Italiano for the 2025 season.

== Career statistics ==
=== Club ===
As of 1 March 2022

Club	Season	League			National Cup		Continental		Other		Total	
Club	Season	Division	Apps	Goals	Apps	Goals	Apps	Goals	Apps	Goals	Apps	Goals
Universidad Católica	2019	Primera División	—		—		—		—		0	0
La Serena (loan)	2020	Primera División	15	0	—		—		—		15	0
La Serena (loan)	2021	Primera División	22	0	—		—		—		22	0
La Serena (loan)	2022	Primera División	1	0	—		—		—		1	0
La Serena (loan)	Total		38	0	0	0	0	0	0	0	38	0
Career total			38	0	0	0	0	0	0	0	38	0
