= César Pinares =

Chilean footballer (born 1991)

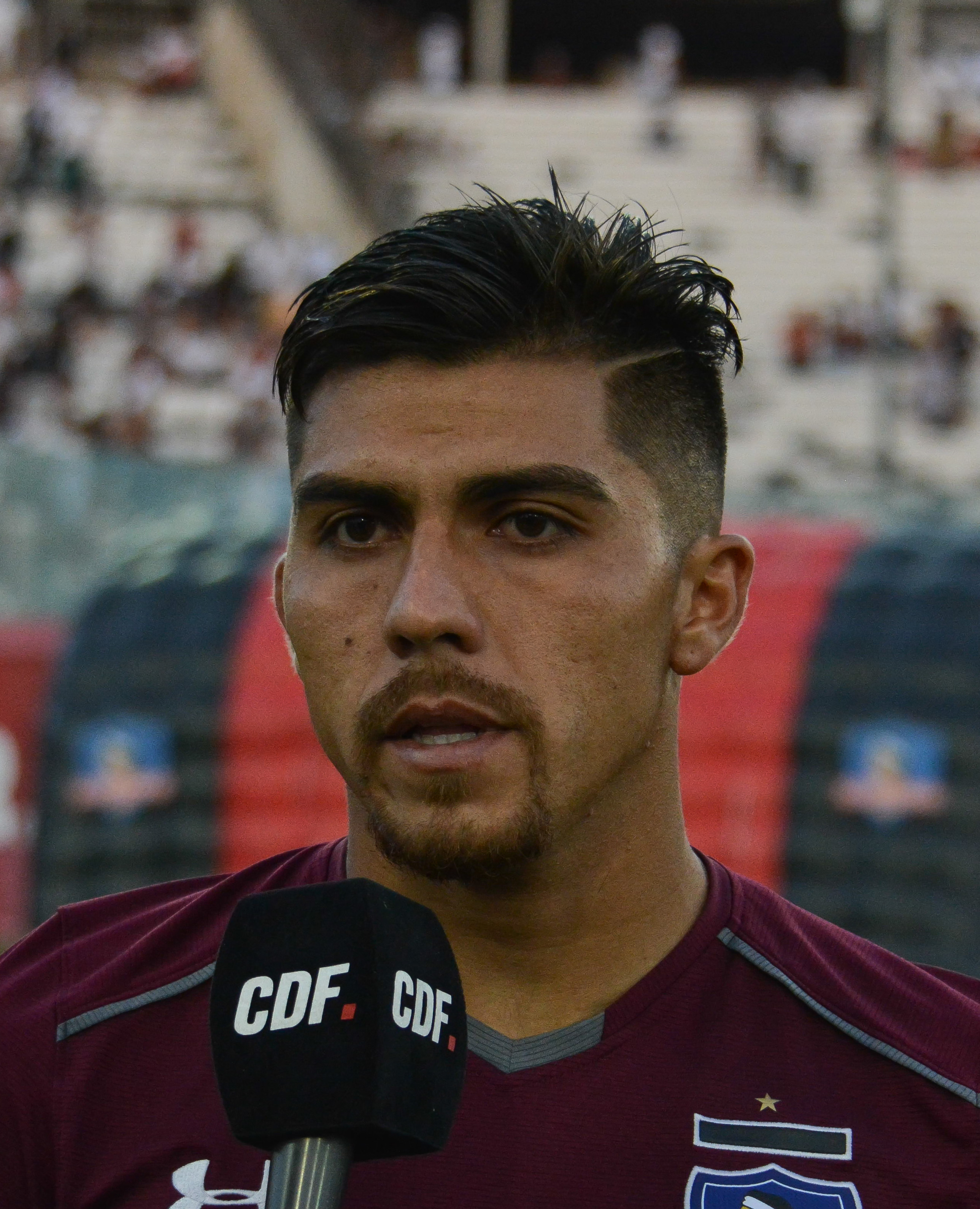
- Pinares with Colo-Colo in 2018

Personal information
- Full name: César Ignacio Pinares Tamayo
- Date of birth: 23 May 1991 (age 35)
- Place of birth: Santiago, Chile
- Height: 1.76 m (5 ft 9 in)
- Position: Midfielder

Team information
- Current team: Audax Italiano
- Number: 19

Youth career
- Colo-Colo
- 2010–2011: ChievoVerona

Senior career*
Years	Team	Apps	(Gls)
2009	Colo-Colo	0	(0)
2010–2012	ChievoVerona	0	(0)
2011–2012	→ Triestina (loan)	19	(0)
2012	San Luis	15	(1)
2013	Santiago Morning	12	(1)
2013–2015	Deportes Iquique	61	(8)
2014	→ Olympiacos Volos (loan)	5	(0)
2016–2017	Unión Española	45	(10)
2017	Al-Sharjah	6	(0)
2018	Colo-Colo	18	(0)
2019–2020	Universidad Católica	33	(9)
2020–2021	Grêmio	14	(2)
2021–2022	Altay	27	(3)
2022–2024	Universidad Católica	56	(5)
2025–2026	Deportes Limache	32	(2)
2026–	Audax Italiano	0	(0)

International career
2011	Chile U20	7	(0)
2017–2021	Chile	18	(1)
- * Club domestic league appearances and goals as of 8 July 2026

César Ignacio Pinares Tamayo (Latin American Spanish: [ˈsesaɾ piˈnaɾes]; born 23 May 1991) is a Chilean footballer who plays as a midfielder for Audax Italiano.

== Club career ==
Born in Santiago de Chile, Pinares started his career at Colo-Colo. In January 2010, he was signed by Serie A club ChievoVerona. He spent 1 1/2 season in Chievo's Primavera under-20 team. On 31 August 2011, he left for Lega Pro Prima Divisione club Triestina. Pinares also wore no. 40 shirt of the first team of Chievo in 2010–11 Serie A.

In March 2025, Pinares signed with Deportes Limache. He ended his contract on 23 April 2026.

On 7 July 2026, Pinares joined Audax Italiano.

== International career ==
Pinares had played in 2011 South American Youth Championship.

== Career statistics ==
=== Club ===
As of match played 29 May 2022

Appearances and goals by club, season and competition
Club	Season	League			State league		National cup		Continental		Other		Total	
Club	Season	Division	Apps	Goals	Apps	Goals	Apps	Goals	Apps	Goals	Apps	Goals	Apps	Goals
Colo-Colo	2009	Primera División	—		—		2	0	—		—		2	0
ChievoVerona	2009-10	U19	13	1	—		—		—		—		13	1
ChievoVerona	2010-11	U19	19	5	—		—		—		—		19	5
ChievoVerona	Total		32	6	0	0	0	0	0	0	0	0	32	6
Triestina (loan)	2011-12	Lega Pro Prima Divisione	19	0	—		—		—		—		19	0
San Luis	2012	Primera B de Chile	15	1	—		—		—		—		15	1
Santiago Morning	2013	Primera B de Chile	12	1	—		—		—		—		12	1
Deportes Iquique	2013-14	Primera División	27	3	—		10	3	—		—		37	6
Deportes Iquique	2014-15	Primera División	29	5	—		4	0	—		1 (Note: Appearance(s) in the Supercopa de Chile)	0	34	5
Deportes Iquique	Total		61	8	0	0	14	3	0	0	1	0	75	11
Olympiacos Volos (loan)	2014	Beta Ethniki	5	0	—		4	0	—		—		9	0
Unión Española	2015-16	Primera División	14	2	—		—		—		—		14	2
Unión Española	2016-17	Primera División	26	7	—		5	1	4 (Note: Appearance(s) in the Copa Libertadores)	0	—		35	8
Unión Española	2017	Primera División	5	1	—		2	1	—		—		7	2
Unión Española	Total		45	10	7	0	7	2	4	0	0	0	56	12
Al-Sharjah	2017	UAE Pro League	6	0	—		1	0	—		—		7	0
Colo-Colo	2018	Primera División	18	0	—		1	0	4	0	—		23	0
Universidad Católica	2019	Primera División	20	5	—		4	0	8 (Note: 6 appearances in the Copa Libertadores, 2 in the Copa Sudamericana)	0	1	1	33	6
Universidad Católica	2020	Primera División	12	4	—		1	0	8 (Note: 6 appearances in the Copa Libertadores, 2 in the Copa Sudamericana)	1	—		21	5
Universidad Católica	Total		32	9	7	0	5	0	16	1	1	1	54	11
Grêmio	2020	Série A	12	1	—		—		4	0	—		16	1
Grêmio	2021	Série A	2	1	3	0	1	0	4 (Note: 2 appearances in the Copa Libertadores, 2 in the Copa Sudamericana)	0	—		10	1
Grêmio	Total		14	2	3	0	1	0	8	0	0	0	26	2
Altay	2021-22	TFF First League	27	3	—		2	0	—		—		29	3
Career total			286	40	3	0	36	5	32	1	2	1	359	47

=== International goals ===
As of match played on 24 June 2021. Scores and results list Chile's goal tally first.

No.	Date	Venue	Opponent	Score	Result	Competition
1.	11 January 2017	Guangxi Sports Center, Nanning, China	Croatia	1–0	1–1 (4–1 p)	2017 China Cup

== Honours ==
Colo-Colo

- Primera División (1): 2009 Clausura

Deportes Iquique

- Copa Chile (1): 2013-14

Universidad Católica

- Primera División (2): 2019, 2020
- Supercopa de Chile (1): 2019

Grêmio

- Campeonato Gaúcho (1): 2021
