= Diego Valencia =

Chilean footballer (born 2000)

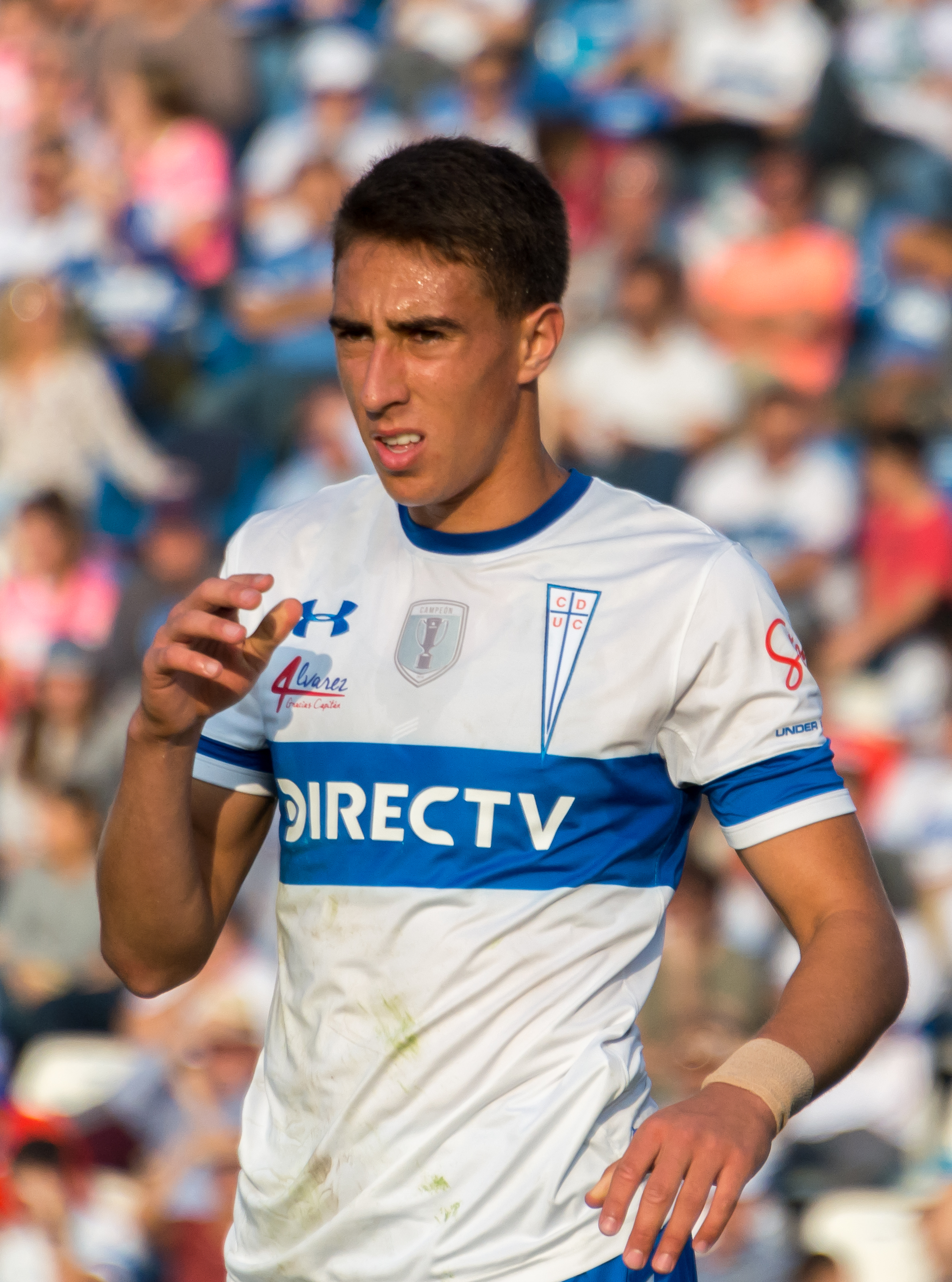
- Valencia with Universidad Católica

Personal information
- Full name: Diego Martín Valencia Morello
- Date of birth: 14 January 2000 (age 26)
- Place of birth: Viña del Mar, Chile
- Height: 1.81 m (5 ft 11 in)
- Position: Forward

Team information
- Current team: Universidad Católica
- Number: 30

Youth career
- Academia La Serena
- 2014–2018: Universidad Católica

Senior career*
Years	Team	Apps	(Gls)
2018–2022	Universidad Católica	93	(24)
2022–2025	Salernitana	16	(1)
2023–2024	→ Atromitos (loan)	29	(2)
2025–	Universidad Católica	11	(1)

International career^{‡}
2017	Chile U17	8	(0)
2018–2019	Chile U20	8	(1)
2020	Chile U23	1	(0)
2021–	Chile	8	(0)
Medal record
Men's football
Representing Chile
South American Games
Gold medal – first place	2018 Cochabamba
- * Club domestic league appearances and goals as of 20 June 2025 ‡ National team caps and goals as of 19:18, 29 January 2022 (UTC)

Diego Martín Valencia Morello (born 14 January 2000) is a Chilean professional footballer who plays as a forward for Universidad Católica and the Chile national team.

== Club career ==
=== Early years ===
As a youth player, Valencia was with Academia La Serena before joining the Universidad Católica youth system.

=== Universidad Catolica ===
Valencia debuted the year 2018 in the match against Deportes Iquique in San Carlos de Apoquindo, on the following date, gave assistance for the goal of the draw against Palestinian in La Cisterna. in the year 2018 he converted his first goals, in the triumph of Catolica against Coquimbo Unido, a match that was also his debut as a starter in the team.

=== Salernitana ===
On 11 July 2022, Valencia signed a four-year contract with Italian club Salernitana.

=== Atromitos (loan) ===
On 9 September 2023, he joined on loan to Super League Greece side Atromitos on a deal for a year with an option to buy.

=== Release by Salernitana ===
On 2 February 2025, Valencia's contract with Salernitana was terminated by mutual consent.

== International career ==
Diego managed to make the winning goal of the Chile national U20 team, when the Odesur won.

In 2019, he was called to the national sub 20 team, after the injury of Nicolás Guerra.

At senior level, he was called up to the Chile national team for the 2021 Copa América Quarter-finals to replace Guillermo Maripán due to an injury, making his international debut against Brazil.

== Career statistics ==
=== Club ===
As of As of match played 21 June 2026

Appearances and goals by club, season and competition
Club	Season	League			Cup (Note: Includes Copa Chile, Coppa Italia and Greek Football Cup)		League cup (Note: Includes Copa de la Liga)		Continental		Other		Total	
Club	Season	Division	Apps	Goals	Apps	Goals	Apps	Goals	Apps	Goals	Apps	Goals	Apps	Goals
Universidad Católica	2018	Primera División	2	0	1	0	—		0	0	—		3	0
Universidad Católica	2019	Primera División	17	4	2	0	—		5 (Note: Three appearances in Copa Libertadores, two in Copa Sudamericana)	0	1 (Note: Appearance(s) in the Supercopa de Chile)	1	25	5
Universidad Católica	2020	Primera División	30	4	—		—		9 (Note: Four appearances in Copa Libertadores, five in Copa Sudamericana)	0	1	0	40	4
Universidad Católica	2021	Primera División	31	14	2	1	—		8 (Note: Appearance(s) in the Copa Libertadores)	2	1	0	42	17
Universidad Católica	2022	Primera División	13	2	1	2	—		7 (Note: Five appearances in Copa Libertadores, one in Copa Sudamericana)	1	1	0	22	5
Universidad Católica	Total		93	24	6	3	—		29	3	4	1	132	31
Salernitana	2022–23	Serie A	12	0	1	0	—		—		—		13	0
Salernitana	2024–25	Serie A	4	0	1	0	—		—		—		5	0
Salernitana	Total		16	0	2	0	—		—		—		18	0
Atromitos (loan)	2023–24	Super League Greece	29	2	5	0	—		—		—		34	2
Universidad Católica	2025	Primera División	25	3	3	0	—		1 (Note: Appearances in Copa Sudamericana)	0	—		29	3
Universidad Católica	2026	Primera División	5	0	0	0	3	1	1	0	1	0	10	1
Universidad Católica	Total		30	3	3	0	3	1	2	0	1	0	39	4
Career total			167	30	16	3	3	1	31	3	5	1	223	38

=== International ===
As of 14 June 2022

Appearances and goals by national team and year
National team	Year	Apps	Goals
Chile	2021	4	0
Chile	2022	3	0
Total		7	0

== Honours ==
Universidad Católica

- Primera División de Chile: 2018, 2019, 2020, 2021
- Supercopa de Chile: 2019, 2020, 2021

Chile U20

- South American Games Gold medal: 2018
