= César Munder =

Cuban-born Chilean footballer (born 2000)

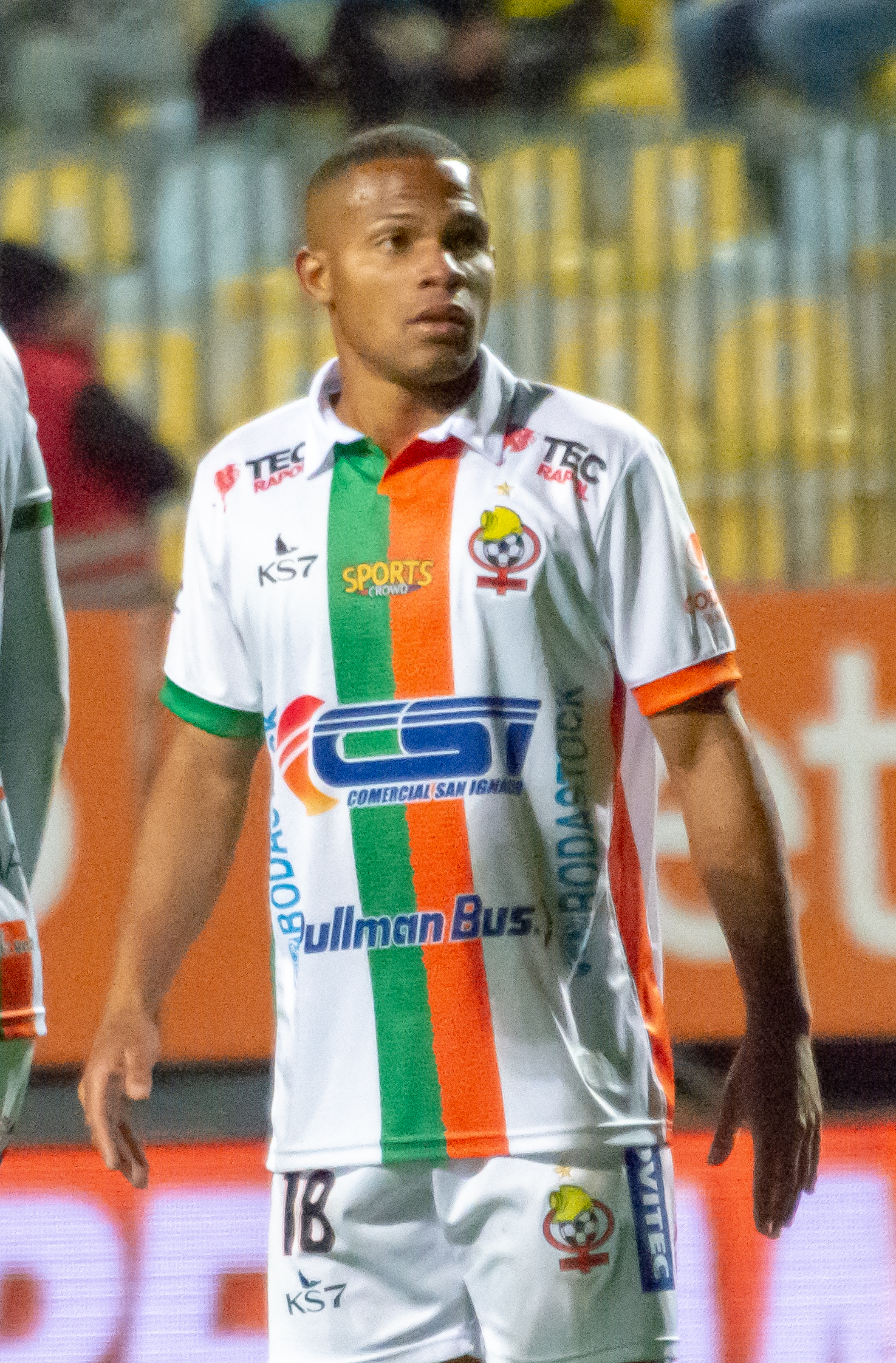
- Munder with Cobresal in 2023

Personal information
- Full name: César Augusto Munder Rodríguez
- Date of birth: 7 January 2000 (age 26)
- Place of birth: La Habana, Cuba
- Height: 1.70 m (5 ft 7 in)
- Position: Forward

Team information
- Current team: Palestino

Youth career
- 2012–2017: Universidad Católica

Senior career*
| Years | Team | Apps | (Gls) |
| 2018–2022 | Universidad Católica | 41 | (4) |
| 2021 | → Deportes La Serena (loan) | 25 | (1) |
| 2022 | → Cobresal (loan) | 15 | (2) |
| 2023–2025 | Cobresal | 69 | (16) |
| 2026– | Palestino | 0 | (0) |

International career^{‡}
| 2019 | Chile U23 | 1 | (0) |
- * Club domestic league appearances and goals as of 3 January 2026 ‡ National team caps and goals as of 9 September 2019

César Augusto Munder Rodríguez (born 7 January 2000) is a Cuban-born Chilean professional footballer who plays as a forward for Palestino.

== Club career ==
In the second half of 2022, Munder joined Cobresal from Universidad Católica. He left them at the end of 2025.

On 3 January 2026, Munder joined Palestino.

== International career ==
Munder made an appearance for Chile U23 in a friendly match against Brazil U23 on 9 September 2019 by replacing Iván Morales.

== Personal life ==
Born in La Habana, Cuba, in 2012 Munder made a short-term trip to Chile to meet his father, who is a Cuban former municipal civil servant living in Chile and is married to a Chilean woman. After returning to Cuba along with his mother, he arrived permanently to Chile at the age of 14 and joined Universidad Católica. Later, he acquired the Chilean nationality on 24 April 2019.

Both his Chilean cousin, Benjamín, and his Cuban uncle, father of Benjamín, are baseball players. Benjamín represented Chile at the 2023 Pan American Games.

== Career statistics ==
As of 18 June 2022

| Club | Season | League | | | National cup | | League cup | | Continental | | Other | | Total | |
| Club | Season | Division | Apps | Goals | Apps | Goals | Apps | Goals | Apps | Goals | Apps | Goals | Apps | Goals |
|---|---|---|---|---|---|---|---|---|---|---|---|---|---|---|
| Universidad Católica | 2018 | Chilean Primera División | 14 | 1 | 2 | 0 | — | | — | | — | | 16 | 1 |
| Universidad Católica | 2019 | Chilean Primera División | 11 | 1 | 2 | 0 | — | | — | | — | | 13 | 1 |
| Universidad Católica | 2020 | Chilean Primera División | 15 | 2 | — | | — | | 4 (Note: Appearances in the Copa Libertadores) | 0 | — | | 19 | 0 |
| Universidad Católica | 2022 | Chilean Primera División | 1 | 0 | — | | — | | — | | — | | 1 | 0 |
| Universidad Católica | Total | | 41 | 4 | 4 | 0 | 0 | 0 | 4 | 0 | 0 | 0 | 49 | 4 |
| La Serena (loan) | 2021 | C. Primera División | 25 | 1 | 4 | 1 | — | | — | | — | | 29 | 2 |
| Cobresal (loan) | 2022 | C. Primera División | 0 | 0 | 1 | 0 | — | | — | | — | | 0 | 0 |
| Career total | | | 66 | 5 | 9 | 1 | 0 | 0 | 4 | 0 | 0 | 0 | 78 | 6 |

== Honours ==
Universidad Católica

- Primera División (3): 2018, 2019, 2020
- Supercopa de Chile (1): 2019
- Friendlies (1): Torneo de Verano Fox Sports 2019
