= Luciano Aued =

Argentine footballer (born 1987)

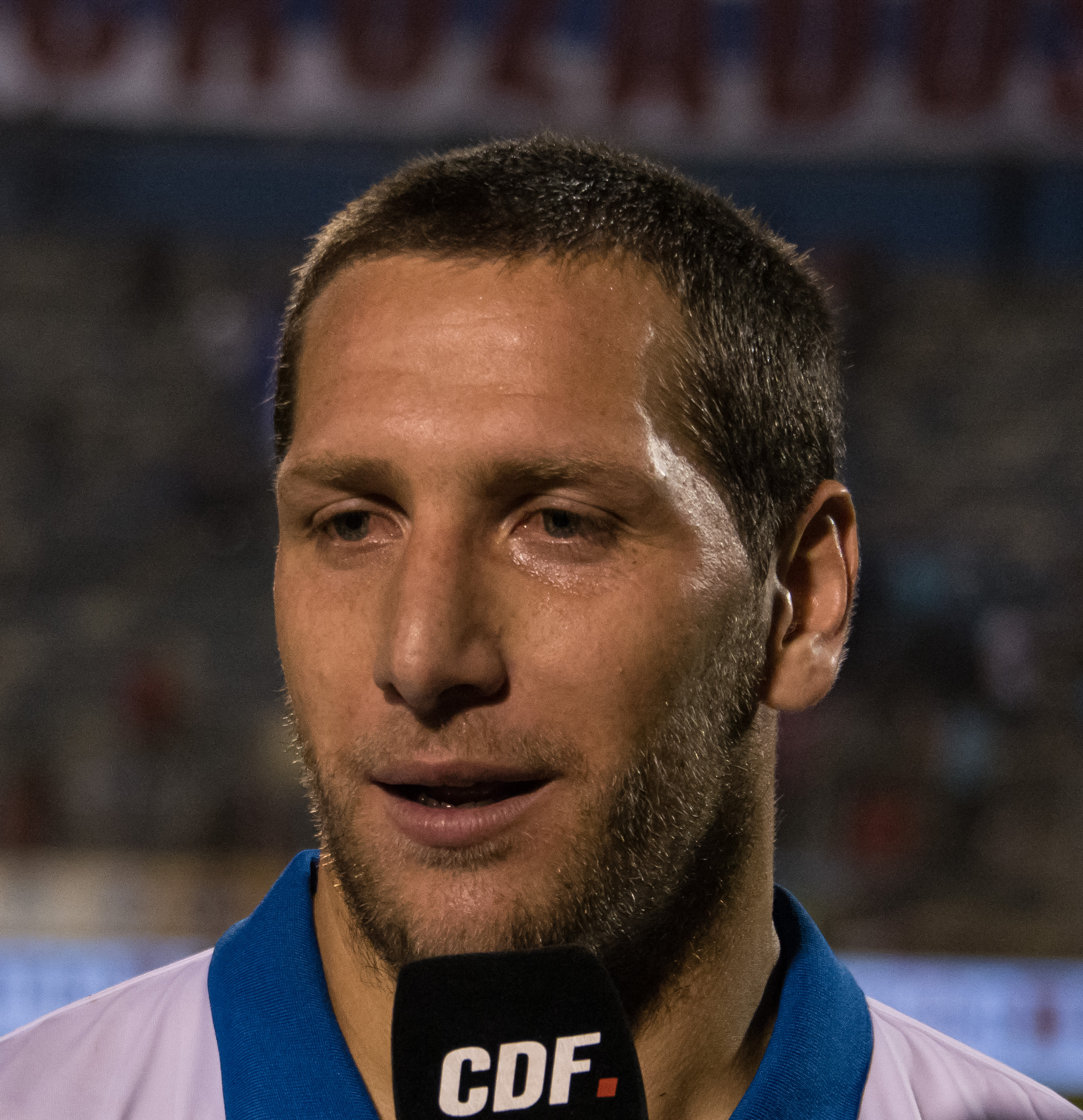
- Aued with Universidad Católica in 2018

Personal information
- Full name: Luciano Román Aued
- Date of birth: 1 March 1987 (age 39)
- Place of birth: La Plata, Argentina
- Height: 1.81 m (5 ft 11 1/2 in)
- Position: Midfielder

Team information
- Current team: Racing Club (youth manager)

Youth career
- Las Malvinas
- Gimnasia La Plata

Senior career*
Years	Team	Apps	(Gls)
2007–2011	Gimnasia La Plata	78	(0)
2011–2017	Racing Club	115	(1)
2017–2022	Universidad Católica	125	(23)
2023	Unión Santa Fe	18	(1)
2023	Instituto	10	(0)
2024	Unión La Calera	14	(1)
2024	Liverpool Montevideo	10	(0)

International career
2011	Argentina	2	(1)

Managerial career
- 2025–: Racing Club (youth)
- 2026: Racing Club (interim)
- * Club domestic league appearances and goals

Luciano Román Aued (born 1 March 1987) is an Argentine football coach and former player who played as a midfielder. He is the current manager of Racing Club's youth categories.

== Club career ==
Aued joined the junior divisions in Gimnasia y Esgrima La Plata in 2001. He was promoted to the senior team in 2007. He played 77 games in Gimnasia's team without scoring any goals from the 2007 Clausura until the 2011 Clausura.

After 2011 Clausura tournament, Gimnasia dropped out of the top division. A business group bought 50% of his playing rights and transferred him to Racing Club in Avellaneda. On December 14, 2014 Racing Club won the Argentine league title first time after 13 years. Aued played crucial role in the team's success. With Ezequiel Videla he formed a formidable midfield duo that helped the Racing Club win the title in 2014 Argentine tournament.

The September 17, 2015, when playing Quarterfinals of Copa Argentina against San Lorenzo, at 32 minutes after the break, Aued scored his first official goal in first division. His goal was celebrated on Twitter under the hashtag #GolDeAued.

In 2024, Aued returned to Chile and joined Unión La Calera, after playing for Unión de Santa Fe and Instituto in his homeland during 2023. He left them in July 2024.

In June 2025, Aued confirmed his retirement.

== Coaching career ==
Following his retirement, Aued became coach of the Racing Club de Avellaneda's reserve team. In May 2026, he and Sebastián Romero were appointed interim coaches of the senior team.

== Personal life ==
Aued is a naturalized Chilean citizen by residence. He received his naturalization certificate in January 2024.

== Career statistics ==
=== Club ===
As of 30 June 2022

Club	Season	League			National Cup		Continental		Other		Total	
Club	Season	Division	Apps	Goals	Apps	Goals	Apps	Goals	Apps	Goals	Apps	Goals
Gimnasia (LP)	2007	A. Primera División	1	0	—		—		—		1	0
Gimnasia (LP)	2007-08	A. Primera División	10	0	—		—		—		10	0
Gimnasia (LP)	2008-09	A. Primera División	8	0	—		—		—		8	0
Gimnasia (LP)	2009-10	A. Primera División	35	0	—		—		—		35	0
Gimnasia (LP)	2010-11	A. Primera División	24	0	—		—		—		24	0
Gimnasia (LP)	Total club		78	0	0	0	0	0	0	0	78	0
Racing Club	2011-12	A. Primera División	13	0	3	0	2 (Note: Appearance(s) in the Copa Sudamericana)	0	—		18	0
Racing Club	2012-13	A. Primera División	6	0	0	0	—		—		6	0
Racing Club	2013-14	A. Primera División	15	0	—		—		—		15	0
Racing Club	2014	A. Primera División	16	0	2	0	—		—		18	0
Racing Club	2015	A. Primera División	24	0	4	1	5 (Note: Appearance(s) in the Copa Libertadores)	0	—		33	1
Racing Club	2016	A. Primera División	12	1	1	0	10	0	—		23	1
Racing Club	2016-17	A. Primera División	29	0	3	0	3	0	—		35	0
Racing Club	Total club		115	1	13	1	20	0	0	0	148	2
Universidad Católica	2017	C. Primera División	12	2	—		—		1 (Note: Appearance(s) in the Supercopa de Chile)	0	13	2
Universidad Católica	2018	C. Primera División	29	5	2	1	—		—		31	6
Universidad Católica	2019	C. Primera División	23	5	6	2	8 (Note: 6 appearances in the Copa Libertadores, 2 in the Copa Sudamericana)	2	1	0	39	9
Universidad Católica	2020	C. Primera División	31	11	—		11 (Note: 5 appearances in the Copa Libertadores, 6 in the Copa Sudamericana)	2	1	0	44	12
Universidad Católica	2021	C. Primera División	16	0	4	0	6	1	1	0	27	1
Universidad Católica	2022	C. Primera División	0	0	2	0	1	0	—		3	0
Universidad Católica	Total club		111	23	14	3	26	5	4	0	157	30
Career total			314	24	27	4	46	5	4	0	383	32

=== International goals ===
#	Date	Venue	Opponent	Score	Result	Competition
1	March 16, 2011	Estadio del Bicentenario, San Juan, Argentina	Venezuela	4–0	4–1	Friendly

== Honours ==
Racing Club

- Argentine Primera División: 2014 Transición

Universidad Católica

- Primera División de Chile: 2018, 2019, 2020, 2021
- Supercopa de Chile: 2019, 2020, 2021

Individual

- Primera División's El Gráfico Golden Ball: 2018
