= Valber Huerta =

Chilean footballer (born 1993)

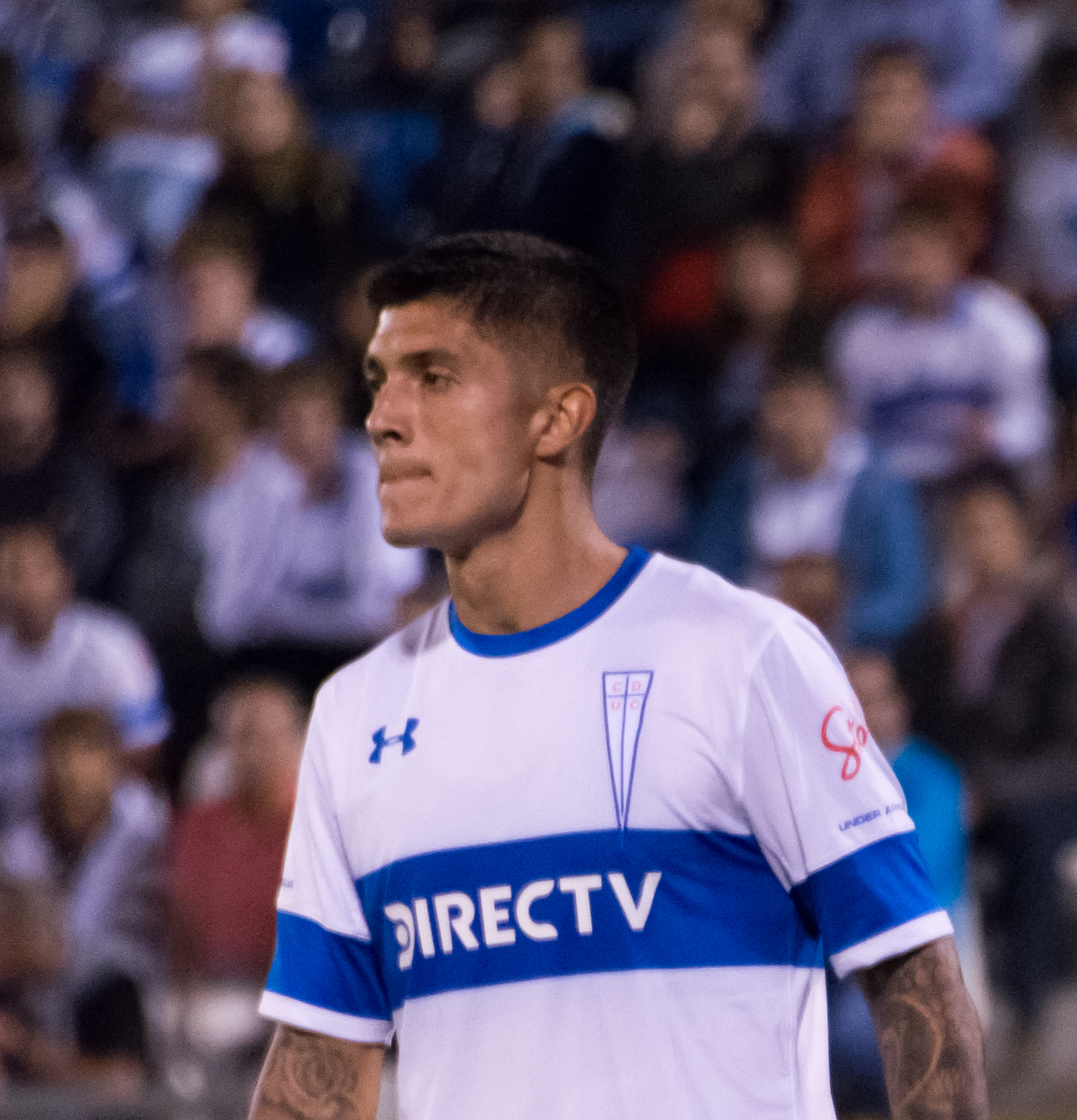
- Huerta with Universidad Católica in 2019

Personal information
- Full name: Valber Roberto Huerta Jerez
- Date of birth: 26 August 1993 (age 33)
- Place of birth: Melipilla, Chile
- Height: 1.85 m (6 ft 1 in)
- Position: Centre-back

Youth career
- Universidad de Chile

Senior career*
Years	Team	Apps	(Gls)
2012–2014	Universidad de Chile	10	(0)
2014–2017	Granada B	15	(0)
2016	→ Huachipato (loan)	12	(2)
2016	→ Colo-Colo (loan)	3	(0)
2017–2018	Watford	0	(0)
2017–2018	→ Huachipato (loan)	55	(4)
2019–2022	Universidad Católica	82	(5)
2022–2024	Toluca	53	(4)
2024–2025	Universidad Católica	0	(0)
Total		230	(15)

International career
2013	Chile U20	12	(0)
2022	Chile	2	(0)
- * Club domestic league appearances and goals

Valber Roberto Huerta Jerez (born 26 August 1993) is a Chilean former professional footballer who played as a centre-back.

== Club career ==
Born in Melipilla, Huerta graduated from Universidad de Chile's youth setup, and was promoted to the main squad in 2012 by manager Jorge Sampaoli. He made his professional debut on 6 May 2012, starting in a 0–2 away loss against Universidad de Concepción for the Torneo Apertura championship.

Huerta only acted as a fourth-choice during his spell at La U, behind Roberto Cereceda, Albert Acevedo and José Rojas. On 28 August 2014 he moved abroad for the first time in his career, signing a five-year deal with Granada CF and being assigned to the reserves in Segunda División B.

In July 2017 he joined English Premier League side Watford and was immediately loaned out to Huachipato.

In February 2022 Huerta joined Mexican Liga MX side Deportivo Toluca from Universidad Católica being a starter & leader of the defense was also called up to the Chile national team he was later presented with jersey #4 for the 2022 campaign.

In the second half of 2024, Huerta returned to Universidad Católica. After suffering several injuries, they ended his contract on 3 November 2025. In May 2026, he cleared up that he did not retire and was looking to sign with any club.

== International career ==
He represented Chile U20 at the 2013 South American Youth Football Championship and 2013 FIFA U-20 World Cup, where Chile reached the quarter-finals.

At senior level, he has been a substitute in the friendly matches against Sweden and Denmark on 2018 and against Bolivia on 2021. Also, he was called up to some training microcycles by Reinaldo Rueda.

== Coaching career ==
In April 2026, Huerta was appointed coach for Real Betis Academy Chile in charge of the under-15 and the under-17 levels.

== Personal life ==
He is named Valber after the Brazilian footballer Válber.

== Career statistics ==
=== Club ===
As of 2 May 2022

Club	Season	League			Cup		Continental		Other		Total	
Club	Season	Division	Apps	Goals	Apps	Goals	Apps	Goals	Apps	Goals	Apps	Goals
Universidad de Chile	2012	Primera División	2	0	2	0	—		—		4	0
Universidad de Chile	2013	Primera División	3	0	—		2 (Note: Appearance(s) in the Copa Libertadores)	0	—		5	0
Universidad de Chile	2013-14	Primera División	5	0	1	0	1 (Note: Appearance(s) in the Copa Sudamericana)	0	—		7	0
Universidad de Chile	2014-15	Primera División	—		3	0	—		—		3	0
Universidad de Chile	Total		10	0	6	0	3	0	0	0	19	0
Granada B	2014-15	Segunda División B	14	0	—		—		—		14	0
Granada B	2015	Segunda División B	1	0	—		—		—		1	0
Granada B	Total		15	0	0	0	0	0	0	0	15	0
Huachipato (loan)	2015-16	Primera División	12	2	—		—		—		12	2
Colo-Colo (loan)	2016-17	Primera División	3	0	—		—		—		3	0
Watford	2017–18	Premier League	—		—		—		—		0	0
Huachipato (loan)	2016-17	Primera División	14	1	—		—		—		14	1
Huachipato (loan)	2017	Primera División	14	2	6	0	—		—		20	2
Huachipato (loan)	2018	Primera División	27	1	6	1	—		—		33	2
Huachipato (loan)	Total		55	4	12	1	0	0	0	0	67	5
Universidad Católica	2019	Primera División	20	1	7	1	5 (Note: 3 appearances in the Copa Libertadores, 2 in the Copa Sudamericana)	0	1 (Note: Appearance(s) in the Supercopa de Chile)	0	33	2
Universidad Católica	2020	Primera División	32	1	—		9 (Note: 5 appearances in the Copa Libertadores, 4 in the Copa Sudamericana)	0	1	0	43	1
Universidad Católica	2021	Primera División	30	3	4	0	8	0	1	0	43	3
Universidad Católica	2022	Primera División	—		—		—		1	0	1	0
Universidad Católica	Total		82	5	10	1	22	0	4	0	119	6
Toluca	2022	Liga MX	11	2	—		—		—		11	2
Career total			188	13	29	2	25	0	0	0	246	15

=== International ===
As of 14 October 2026.

Appearances and goals by national team and year
National team	Year	Apps	Goals
Chile	2022	2	0
Total		2	0

== Honours ==
Universidad de Chile

- Primera División: 2012–A
- Copa Chile: 2012–13

Colo-Colo

- Copa Chile: 2016

Universidad Católica

- Primera División: 2019, 2020, 2021
- Supercopa de Chile: 2019, 2020, 2021
