= Yerco Oyanedel =

Chilean footballer (born 2000)

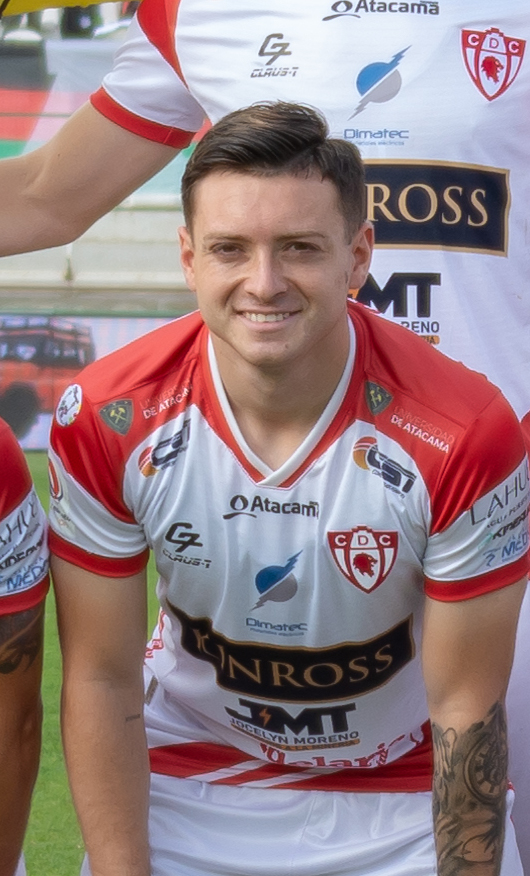
- Oyanedel with Deportes Copiapó in 2023

Personal information
- Full name: Yerco Abraham Oyanedel Hernández
- Date of birth: 19 September 2000 (age 26)
- Place of birth: Santiago, Chile
- Height: 1.70 m (5 ft 7 in)
- Position: Left-back

Team information
- Current team: Universidad de Concepción

Youth career
- 2016–2019: Universidad Católica

Senior career*
Years	Team	Apps	(Gls)
2019–2022	Universidad Católica	0	(0)
2020	→ Rangers (loan)	27	(1)
2021–2022	→ Unión La Calera (loan)	19	(0)
2023	Cobresal	5	(0)
2023–2024	Deportes Copiapó	35	(0)
2025–	Universidad de Concepción	30	(1)

International career^{‡}
2015	Chile U15		
2017	Chile U17	17	(0)
- * Club domestic league appearances and goals as of 7 January 2026 ‡ National team caps and goals as of 14 October 2017

Yerco Abraham Oyanedel Hernández (born 19 September 2000) is a Chilean professional footballer who plays as a left-back for Universidad de Concepción.

== Club career ==
Oyanedel debuted the year 2019 in the match against Union la Calera in Calera, on the following date.

In 2023 and 2024, Oyanedel played for Deportes Copiapó.

In February 2025, Oyanedel joined Universidad de Concepción, winning the 2025 Primera B de Chile.

On 6 January 2026, Oyanedel was announced as a signing for Deportes Limache, but he renewed with Universidad de Concepción the next day.

== International career ==
At early age, he represented Chile at under-15 level at the 2015 South American U-15 Championship and winning the friendly 2015 Aspire Tri-Series International Tournament in Doha, Qatar. At under-17 level, he represented Chile at two friendly matches against USA U17, at the 2017 South American U-17 Championship – Chile was the runner-up – and at the 2017 FIFA U-17 World Cup. Also, he played all the matches for Chile U17 at the friendly tournament Lafarge Foot Avenir 2017 in France, better known as Tournament Limoges, where Chile became champion after defeating Belgium U18 and Poland U18 and drawing France U18.

== Career statistics ==
=== Club ===
As of 1 March 2022

Appearances and goals by club, season and competition
Club	Season	League			National cup		Continental		Other		Total	
Club	Season	Division	Apps	Goals	Apps	Goals	Apps	Goals	Apps	Goals	Apps	Goals
Universidad Católica	2019	Primera División	—		1	0	—		—		1	0
Rangers (loan)	2020	Primera B	27	1	—		—		—		27	1
Unión La Calera (loan)	2021	Primera División	31	0	2	0	6 (Note: Appearance(s) in the Copa Libertadores)	0	—		39	0
Unión La Calera (loan)	2022	Primera División	4	0	0	0	0	0	—		4	0
Unión La Calera (loan)	Total		35	0	0	0	6	0	0	0	43	10
Career total			62	1	3	0	6	0	0	0	71	1

== Honours ==
Universidad Católica

- Primera División: 2018, 2019
- Supercopa de Chile: 2019
- Torneo de Verano Fox Sports 2019

Universidad de Concepción

- Primera B de Chile: 2025

Chile U15

- Aspire Tri-Series International Tournament: 2015

Chile U17

- Tournoi de Limoges: 2017
