= Gastón Lezcano =

Argentine footballer

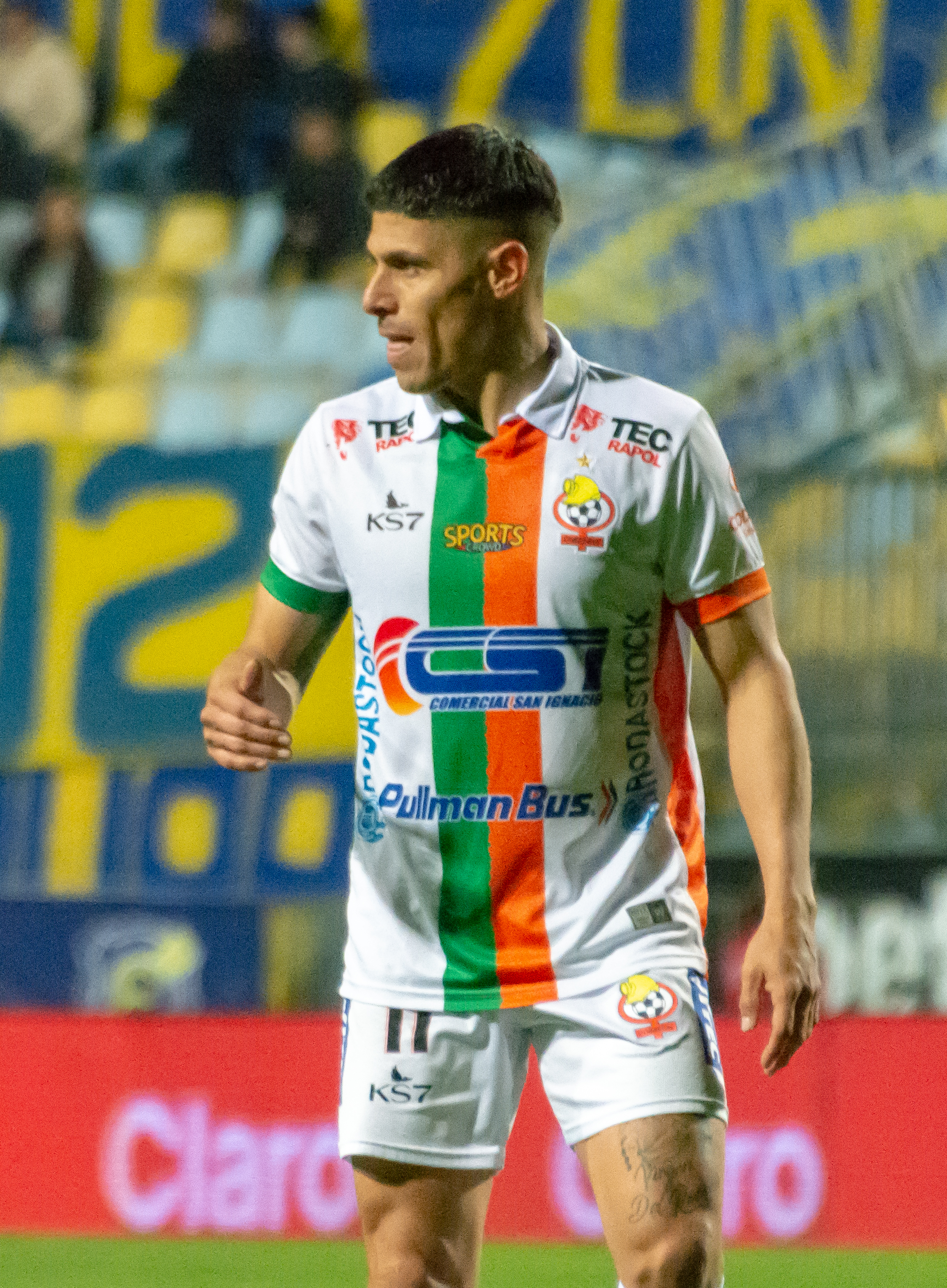
- Lezcano with Cobresal in 2023

Personal information
- Full name: Gastón Adrián Lezcano
- Date of birth: 21 November 1986 (age 39)
- Place of birth: San Nicolás de los Arroyos, Argentina
- Height: 1.68 m (5 ft 6 in)
- Position: Winger

Youth career
- General Lamadrid

Senior career*
Years	Team	Apps	(Gls)
2005–2011	General Lamadrid	134	(38)
2008	→ Cañuelas (loan)	3	(0)
2009	→ Barracas Central (loan)	2	(3)
2011	Santiago Morning	12	(2)
2012	3 de Febrero	20	(11)
2013	Cobreloa	17	(3)
2014–2017	O'Higgins	88	(26)
2017	→ Morelia (loan)	11	(2)
2018–2019	Morelia	65	(8)
2020–2021	Universidad Católica	41	(3)
2022–2024	Cobresal	83	(29)
2025	Magallanes	12	(0)
Total		488	(125)
- * Club domestic league appearances and goals

Gastón Adrián Lezcano (born November 21, 1986, in San Nicolás de los Arroyos, Argentina) is an Argentine former footballer who played as a left or right winger.

== Career ==
On 31 December 2013, he is signed by the O'Higgins for the 2013–14 Chilean Primera División season.

In 2014, he won the Supercopa de Chile against Deportes Iquique, replacing at the 59' to Gonzalo Barriga.

In January 2025, Lezcano signed with Magallanes from Cobresal. He left them on 30 July of the same year.

On 6 January 2026, Lezcano announced his retirement.

== Honours ==
General Lamadrid

- Primera C: 2010–11

O'Higgins

- Supercopa de Chile: 2014

Universidad Católica

- Primera División de Chile (2): 2020, 2021
- Supercopa de Chile (2): 2020, 2021
