= Edson Puch =

Chilean footballer (born 1986)

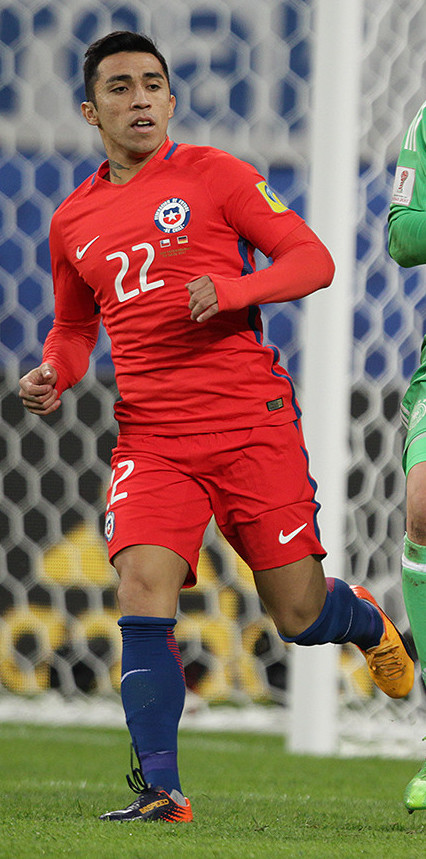
- Puch playing with Chile at the 2017 FIFA Confederations Cup

Personal information
- Full name: Edson Raúl Puch Cortez
- Date of birth: 9 April 1986 (age 40)
- Place of birth: Iquique, Chile
- Height: 1.69 m (5 ft 7 in)
- Positions: Winger; attacking midfielder

Youth career
- Huachipato

Senior career*
| Years | Team | Apps | (Gls) |
| 2005–2006 | Huachipato | 18 | (0) |
| 2007–2009 | Municipal Iquique | 74 | (22) |
| 2009–2011 | Universidad de Chile | 65 | (17) |
| 2011–2014 | Al-Wasl | 16 | (2) |
| 2012–2013 | → Deportes Iquique (loan) | 26 | (2) |
| 2015 | Huracán | 6 | (0) |
| 2016 | LDU Quito | 15 | (3) |
| 2016–2017 | Necaxa | 35 | (15) |
| 2017–2019 | Pachuca | 9 | (2) |
| 2018 | → Querétaro (loan) | 22 | (6) |
| 2019 | → Universidad Católica (loan) | 17 | (5) |
| 2020–2021 | Universidad Católica | 46 | (6) |
| 2022 | Deportes Iquique | 9 | (0) |
| 2023–2026 | Deportes Iquique | 60 | (13) |
| Total | | 418 | (93) |

International career
| 2009–2017 | Chile | 20 | (2) |
Medal record
Representing Chile
| Winner | Copa América Centenario | 2016 |
| Runner-up | FIFA Confederations Cup | 2017 |
- * Club domestic league appearances and goals

Edson Raúl Puch Cortez (Spanish pronunciation: [ˈeðsom ˈputʃ]; born 9 April 1986) is a Chilean former footballer who played as a forward.

== Club career ==
=== Early career ===
Born in Iquique, Puch began his career at hometown Deportes Iquique youth ranks, then moving to Huachipato reserve team in 2003.

In 2008, after two years playing in Talcahuano based–side, he returned to his homeland to play for Iquique where he achieved a third-tier title that season as well as the first-tier promotion the following year. After an impressive season during the 2009 Torneo Apertura being a key player alongside Cristian Bogado, on mid-year, Puch reached a four-year deal with Chilean powerhouse Universidad de Chile which invested US$850,000 for his rights.

He quickly settled as starter playing for The Owls where celebrated a league title in 2011 with Jorge Sampaoli as head coach. However, on 14 May, he accepted an offer from Emirati club Al-Wasl FC for a US$4 million fee. There Puch was coached by Diego Maradona but only scored one goal in six league games.

=== Iquique, UAE & Latin America ===
In 2012, he returned to Deportes Iquique on loan. After completing the six-month loan spell in June, he didn't feature in any game during the second half of the year. After he initially returned to Al-Wasl, he was loaned back to Iquique, but the team didn't register him in time. He officially re-joined Iquique in January 2013 after training that period with the team, reappearing in a 1–1 away draw with León for the Copa Libertadores first stage.

In June 2013 he returned to Al-Wasl. This time Puch scored one goal in ten UAE Arabian Gulf League games. In August 2014, he ended his contract with Emirati club and then signed for Argentina's Huracán as a free agent in January 2015. After a season at Parque Patricios-based side, he moved to Ecuadorian giants L.D.U. Quito, led by Claudio Borghi who usually called-up him during their period at Chile national team (2011–2012).

=== Necaxa ===
After an impressive 2016 Copa América Centenario he joined Liga MX club Necaxa. Helped Necaxa stay in Liga MX after recently being promoted from 2015–16 Ascenso MX season. He scored nine goals in his first season in Mexico.

=== Pachuca ===
On 7 June 2017, C.F. Pachuca announced the signing of Edson Puch from Club Necaxa.

=== Querétaro ===
On 13 December 2017, Querétaro signed Puch on loan from Pachuca, with an option to purchase.

=== Deportes Iquique ===
On 27 April 2022, Puch announced his retirement from playing after an attack on the players by fans during a training session of Deportes Iquique. However, he returned to play for the club in June 2023.

On 26 December 2025, Puch announced his definitive retirement at the end of the 2026 season. However, he retired on 8 July 2026 due to a relentless ankle injury.

== International career ==
In 2009, Puch received a call-up from Marcelo Bielsa to play the Kirin Cup, debuting in a 4–0 loss against Japan as a 46th-minute substitute for Jorge Valdivia. After his first international participation, he was recalled in November for a game with Slovakia at Bratislava. In 2011, during Bielsa's last match as national team coach against United States he played his first full international game during a 1–1 draw.

Puch was named in the 2015 Copa America squad but had to withdraw through injury being replaced by Francisco Silva.

Puch scored two goals in the seven-goal match against Mexico in the Copa América Centenario. Later, in the tournament he was part of the Chilean team that ran to the final. He was subbed in the 80th minute of the final against Argentina, which Chile won 4–2 on penalties.

== Career statistics ==
=== Club ===
As of 30 January 2018

| Club | Season | League | | Cup | | Continental | | Total | |
| Club | Season | Apps | Goals | Apps | Goals | Apps | Goals | Apps | Goals |
|---|---|---|---|---|---|---|---|---|---|
| Huachipato | 2005 | 9 | 0 | – | – | – | – | 9 | 0 |
| Huachipato | 2006 | 9 | 0 | – | – | 0 | 0 | 9 | 0 |
| Huachipato | Total | 18 | 0 | – | – | 0 | 0 | 18 | 0 |
| Deportes Iquique | 2007 | 38 | 6 | – | – | – | – | 38 | 6 |
| Deportes Iquique | 2008 | 19 | 10 | 3 | 1 | – | – | 22 | 11 |
| Deportes Iquique | 2009 | 17 | 6 | – | – | – | – | 17 | 6 |
| Deportes Iquique | Total | 74 | 22 | 3 | 1 | – | – | 77 | 23 |
| Universidad de Chile | 2009 | 11 | 3 | 1 | 0 | 6 | 0 | 18 | 3 |
| Universidad de Chile | 2010 | 32 | 6 | 2 | 0 | 12 | 1 | 46 | 7 |
| Universidad de Chile | 2011 | 22 | 8 | – | – | – | – | 22 | 8 |
| Universidad de Chile | Total | 65 | 17 | 3 | 0 | 18 | 1 | 86 | 18 |
| Al Wasl | 2011–12 | 6 | 1 | 6 | 0 | – | – | 12 | 1 |
| Al Wasl | 2013–14 | 10 | 1 | 1 | 0 | – | – | 11 | 1 |
| Al Wasl | Total | 16 | 2 | 7 | 0 | – | – | 23 | 2 |
| → Deportes Iquique (loan) | 2012 | 15 | 2 | 0 | 0 | – | – | 15 | 2 |
| → Deportes Iquique (loan) | 2013 | 11 | 0 | 0 | 0 | 7 | 0 | 18 | 0 |
| → Deportes Iquique (loan) | Total | 26 | 2 | 0 | 0 | 7 | 0 | 33 | 2 |
| Huracán | 2015 | 6 | 0 | 1 | 1 | 3 | 0 | 10 | 1 |
| Huracán | Total | 6 | 0 | 1 | 1 | 3 | 0 | 10 | 1 |
| LDU Quito | 2016 | 15 | 3 | 0 | 0 | 5 | 1 | 20 | 4 |
| LDU Quito | Total | 15 | 3 | 0 | 0 | 5 | 1 | 20 | 4 |
| Necaxa | 2016–17 | 35 | 15 | 1 | 1 | - | - | 36 | 16 |
| Necaxa | Total | 35 | 15 | 1 | 1 | - | - | 36 | 16 |
| Pachuca | 2017–18 | 9 | 2 | 3 | 0 | - | - | 12 | 2 |
| Pachuca | Total | 9 | 2 | 3 | 0 | - | - | 12 | 2 |
| Querétaro | 2017–18 | 3 | 0 | 1 | 0 | - | - | 4 | 0 |
| Querétaro | Total | 3 | 0 | 1 | 0 | - | - | 4 | 0 |
| Career total | | 266 | 63 | 19 | 3 | 33 | 2 | 313 | 68 |

Chile national team
| Year | Apps | Goals |
|---|---|---|
| 2009 | 3 | 0 |
| 2010 | 1 | 0 |
| 2011 | 1 | 0 |
| 2012 | 1 | 0 |
| 2016 | 9 | 2 |
| 2017 | 4 | 0 |
| Total | 19 | 2 |

International goals

| # | Date | Venue | Opponent | Score | Result | Competition |
|---|---|---|---|---|---|---|
| 1. | 18 June 2016 | Levi's Stadium, Santa Clara, United States | Mexico | 1–0 | 7–0 | Copa América Centenario |
| 2. | 18 June 2016 | Levi's Stadium, Santa Clara, United States | Mexico | 7–0 | 7–0 | Copa América Centenario |

== Outside football ==
Puch has an inherited musical side since both his grandfather, Orlando Cortez, and his mother, Blanca Cortez were musicians and singers. His grandfather was a guitar player and got a band called Orquesta de Ñatito Cortez and his mother competed in the Chilean TV program Festival de la una as a singer. At the same time he was a footballer, Puch carried out a musical career. He used the stage name Comando to make music with a blend of reggaeton, rapping and trap.

Since his retirement from football, he works in his musical studio, The Magic Studio, and has taken the stage name of Edesound, adding elements of Mexican corrido to his songs, what he names corrido tumbado.

== Honours ==
Universidad de Chile

- Primera División de Chile: 2011 Apertura

Huracán

- Supercopa Argentina: 2014

Universidad Católica

- Primera División de Chile (3): 2019, 2020, 2021
- Supercopa de Chile (3): 2019, 2020, 2021

Chile

- Copa América: 2016

Individual

- Liga MX Best XI: 2016–17
- Chilean Primera División Ideal Team: 2024
