= Maximiliano Cerato =

Argentine-Chilean footballer (born 1988)

Personal information
- Full name: Maximilian Iván Cerato
- Date of birth: 21 April 1988 (age 38)
- Place of birth: Río Gallegos, Argentina
- Height: 1.71 m (5 ft 7 in)
- Position: Forward

Youth career
- River Plate
- 2004–2007: Defensores de Belgrano

Senior career*
Years	Team	Apps	(Gls)
2008–2010	Defensores de Belgrano	64	(8)
2010–2017	Everton	174	(35)
2017–2018	León	23	(1)
2019–2021	Everton	51	(6)
2022	Cobreloa	25	(6)
2023	Defensores de Belgrano	30	(2)
2024	Deportes Linares	14	(3)
2025	Bancruz	–	(–)
Total		381	(61)
- * Club domestic league appearances and goals

Maximiliano Iván Cerato (born 21 April 1988 in Río Gallegos, Argentina) is an Argentine naturalized Chilean former professional footballer who played as a forward.

== Career ==
In 2024, Cerato returned to Chile after playing for Defensores de Belgrano and signed with Deportes Linares in the Segunda División Profesional.

Back to his hometown, Cerato joined Bancruz in August 2025.

It was confirmed his retirement in November 2025.

== Personal life ==
Cerato holds dual Argentine-Chilean nationality since he naturalized Chilean by residence in January 2019.
