= Andrés Souper =

American soccer player (born 1999)

Personal information
- Full name: Andrés Souper de la Cruz
- Date of birth: May 6, 1999 (age 27)
- Place of birth: New York City, U.S.
- Height: 5 ft 8 in (1.73 m)
- Position: Midfielder

Team information
- Current team: Loudoun United
- Number: 14

Youth career
- Universidad Católica

Senior career*
Years	Team	Apps	(Gls)
2017–2021	Universidad Católica	0	(0)
2018	→ Deportes Valdivia (loan)	10	(1)
2019	→ Deportes Puerto Montt (loan)	18	(1)
2020–2021	→ Deportes Antofagasta (loan)	23	(5)
2021–2025	Deportes Antofagasta	73	(7)
2023	→ Magallanes (loan)	7	(0)
2026	Loudoun United	11	(0)
- * Club domestic league appearances and goals as of 18 August 2026

Andrés Souper de la Cruz (born May 6, 1999) is a Chilean-American professional soccer player who last played as an attacking midfielder for USL Championship club Loudoun United FC.

== Career ==
Born in the United States, Souper started his career with Chilean top flight side Universidad Católica.

For 2018, he was sent on loan to Valdivia in the second-tier Primera B de Chile.

Ahead of the 2020 season, Souper was sent on loan to top flight team Deportes Antofagasta. After the expiry of his loan deal, he signed a permanent contract with the club. In 2023, he played on loan for Magallanes.

In January 2026 USL Championship side Loudoun United announced they had signed Souper to a 1-year contract.
