= Kevin Medel =

Chilean footballer (born 1996)

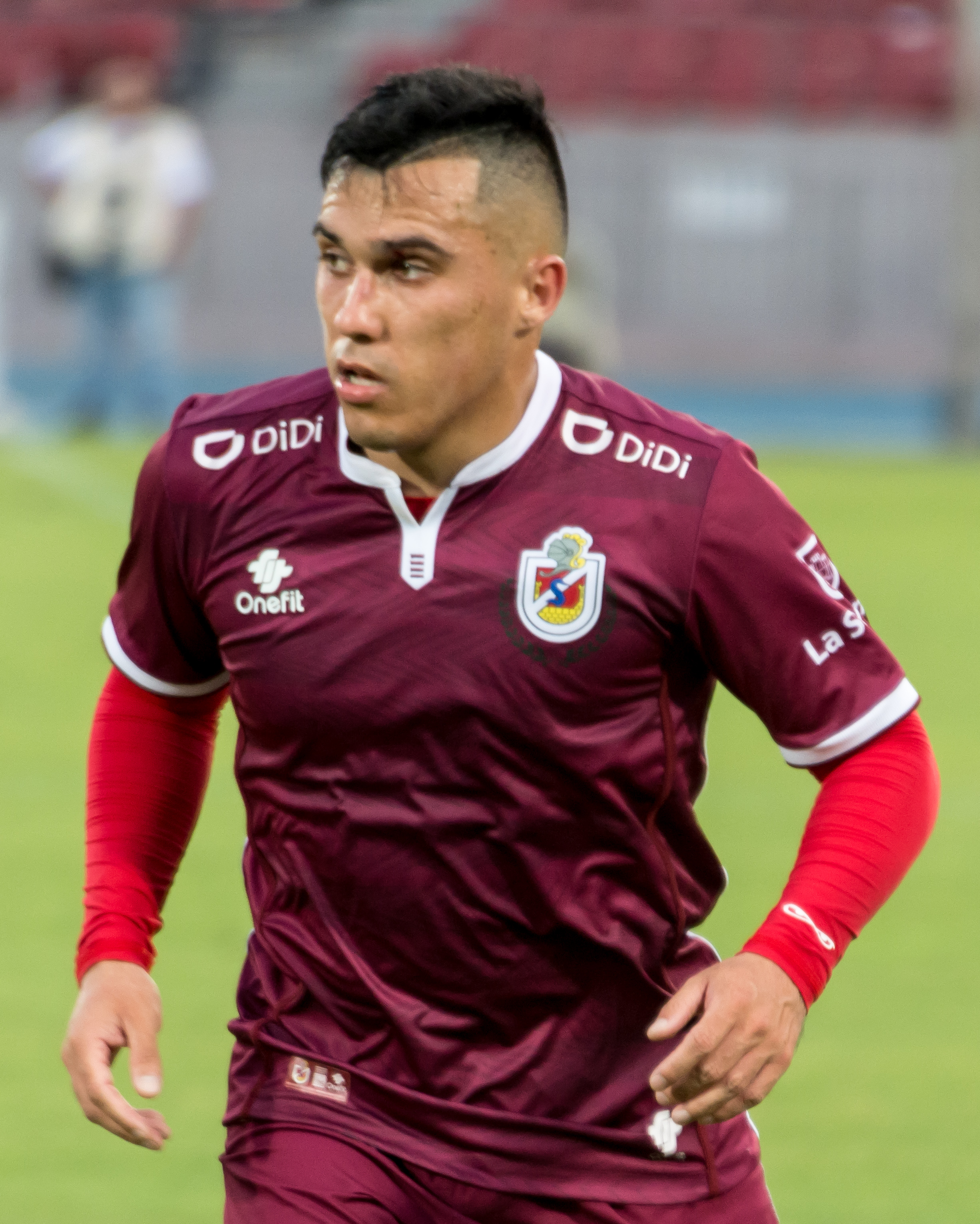
- Medel with Deportes La Serena in 2020

Personal information
- Full name: Kevin Felipe Medel Soto
- Date of birth: 24 May 1996 (age 30)
- Place of birth: Santiago, Chile
- Height: 1.70 m (5 ft 7 in)
- Position: Central midfielder

Team information
- Current team: Deportes Santa Cruz

Youth career
- 2005–2015: Universidad Católica

Senior career*
Years	Team	Apps	(Gls)
2015–2020	Universidad Católica	0	(0)
2015–2016	→ San Marcos (loan)	11	(0)
2016–2018	→ Everton (loan)	37	(0)
2019–2020	→ Deportes La Serena (loan)	41	(2)
2021–2023	Universidad de Concepción	70	(5)
2024–	Deportes Santa Cruz	0	(0)

International career
2013	Chile U17	3	(1)
- * Club domestic league appearances and goals as of 29 December 2023

Kevin Felipe Medel Soto (born 24 May 1996) is a Chilean footballer who plays as a central midfielder for Deportes Santa Cruz in the Primera B de Chile.

== Career ==
For the 2024 season, he signed with Deportes Santa Cruz from Universidad de Concepción.

== Personal life ==
He is the brother of the Chilean international, Gary Medel.
