= Jeisson Vargas =

Chilean footballer (born 1997)

Personal information
- Full name: Jeisson Andrés Vargas Salazar
- Date of birth: 15 September 1997 (age 29)
- Place of birth: Recoleta, Santiago, Chile
- Height: 1.69 m (5 ft 7 in)
- Position: Attacking midfielder

Team information
- Current team: Deportes La Serena
- Number: 10

Youth career
- 2011–2014: Universidad Católica

Senior career*
Years	Team	Apps	(Gls)
2014–2016	Universidad Católica	33	(9)
2016–2019	Montreal Impact	19	(4)
2016–2017	→ Estudiantes (loan)	9	(0)
2017	→ Universidad Católica (loan)	11	(1)
2019	→ Universidad Católica (loan)	3	(0)
2020–2021	Unión La Calera	54	(13)
2022–2023	Universidad de Chile	22	(0)
2023	→ Al-Rayyan (loan)	11	(4)
2024	Huachipato	3	(0)
2025–	Deportes La Serena	0	(0)

International career
2015–2017	Chile U20	3	(0)
- * Club domestic league appearances and goals as of 22 December 2024

Jeisson Andrés Vargas Salazar (born 15 September 1997) is a Chilean professional footballer who plays for Deportes La Serena as an attacking midfielder.

== Club career ==
Vargas made his debut for Universidad Católica playing the last 15 minutes against Universidad de Concepción in 2014.

In January 2018, Vargas signed with MLS side Montreal Impact.

In 2023, he joined Qatari club Al-Rayyan on loan from Universidad de Chile on a deal for six months.

In January 2024, Vargas joined Huachipato. In August of the same year, he ended his contract with Huachipato and moved to Europe to join Bosnian club FK Željezničar. Due to documentation issues, he could not sign with them. The next year, Vargas joined Deportes La Serena.

== International career ==
Along with Chile U20, Vargas won the L'Alcúdia Tournament in 2015.

Vargas was named in Chile's provisional squad for Copa América Centenario but was cut from the final squad.

== Personal life ==
Vargas is the half-brother of Joan Orellana, a player from the Universidad Católica youth system.

== Honours ==
Universidad Católica

- Primera División: Torneo Clausura 2015–16, 2019
- Supercopa de Chile: 2019

Chile U20

- L'Alcúdia International Tournament: 2015
