= Vicente Fernández (Chilean footballer) =

Chilean footballer (born 1999)

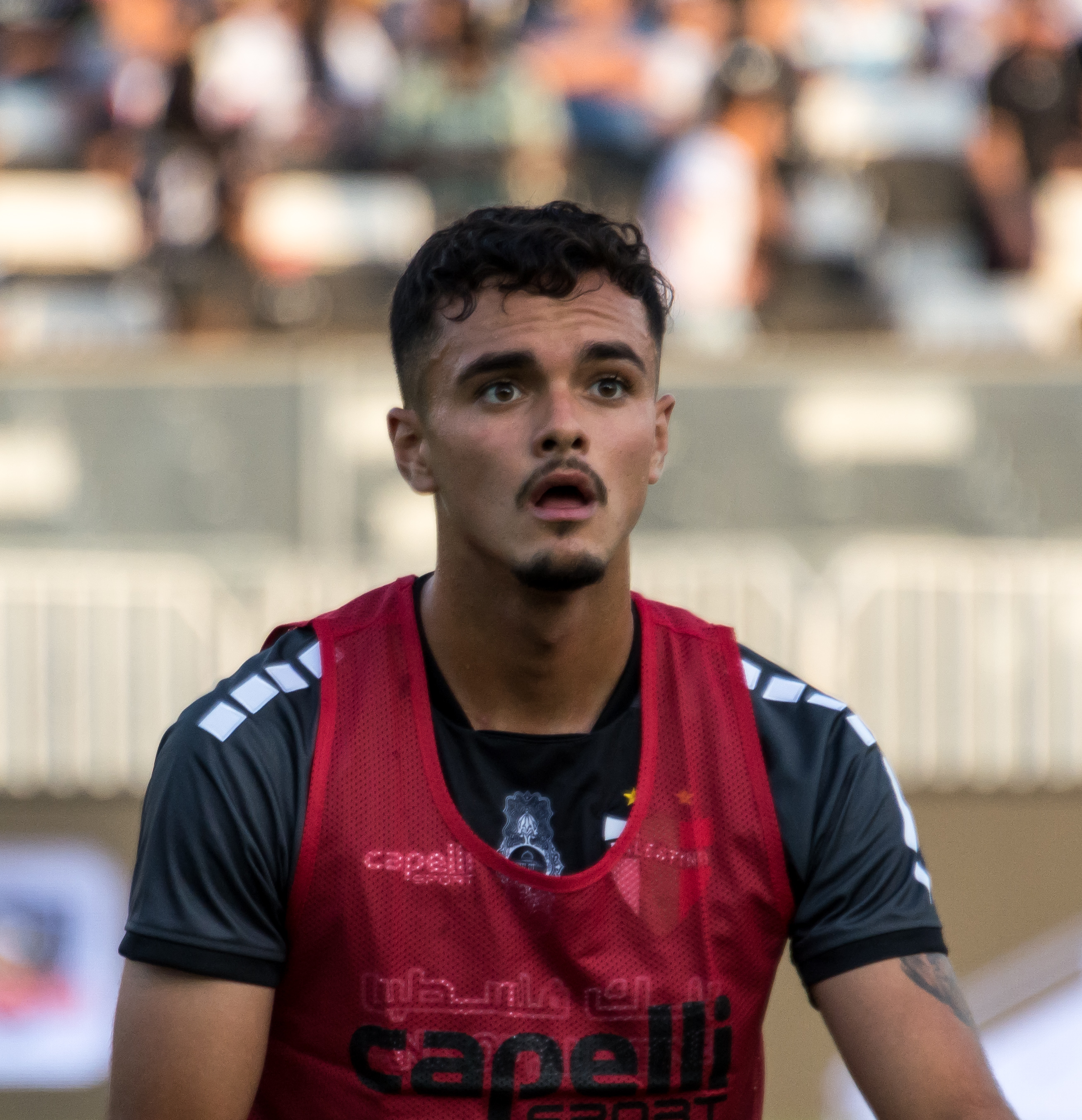
- Fernández with Palestino in 2020

Personal information
- Full name: Vicente Felipe Fernández Godoy
- Date of birth: 17 February 1999 (age 27)
- Place of birth: San Bernardo, Santiago, Chile
- Height: 1.75 m (5 ft 9 in)
- Position: Left-back

Team information
- Current team: Everton

Youth career
- 2014–2018: Universidad Católica

Senior career*
Years	Team	Apps	(Gls)
2018–2021	Universidad Católica	0	(0)
2018	→ Unión La Calera (loan)	8	(0)
2019	→ Santiago Morning (loan)	6	(0)
2020–2021	→ Palestino (loan)	29	(0)
2021–2023	Palestino	46	(0)
2023	Talleres	2	(0)
2023	→ Universidad de Chile (loan)	6	(0)
2024	Melbourne City	12	(0)
2024	O'Higgins	9	(0)
2025	Cobresal	27	(1)
2026–	Everton	0	(0)

International career
2019	Chile U20	1	(0)
- * Club domestic league appearances and goals as of 22 December 2025

Vicente Felipe Fernández Godoy (born 17 February 1999) is a Chilean professional footballer who plays as a left-back for Everton de Viña del Mar.

== Career ==
In February 2023, Fernández joined Argentine club Talleres de Córdoba on a deal until the 2026 season. In July of the same year, he was loaned to Universidad de Chile on a deal for a year.

In February 2024, Fernández signed with Melbourne City as a free agent for the remainder of the 2023–24 season. Back in Chile, he joined O'Higgins in July of the same year. The next year, he switched to Cobresal.

On 29 December 2025, Fernández signed with Everton de Viña del Mar.

== Career statistics ==
=== Club ===
As of 23 August 2024

Appearances and goals by club, season and competition
Club	Season	League			National Cup		Continental		Total	
Club	Season	Division	Apps	Goals	Apps	Goals	Apps	Goals	Apps	Goals
Universidad Católica	2019	Chilean Primera División	0	0	1	0	0	0	1	0
Unión La Calera (loan)	2018	Chilean Primera División	8	0	—		—		8	0
Santiago Morning (loan)	2019	Chilean First B Division	6	0	—		—		6	0
Palestino (loan)	2020	Chilean Primera División	29	0	—		3 (Note: Appearance(s) in Copa Libertadores)	0	32	0
Palestino	2021	Chilean Primera División	24	0	1	0	6 (Note: Appearance(s) in Copa Sudamericana)	0	31	0
Palestino	2022	Chilean Primera División	20	0	2	0	—		22	0
Palestino	2023	Chilean Primera División	2	0	—		—		2	0
Palestino	Total		46	0	3	0	6	0	55	0
Talleres	2023	Argentine Primera División	2	0	—		—		2	0
Universidad de Chile (loan)	2023	Chilean Primera División	6	0	—		—		6	0
Melbourne City	2023-24	A-League	12	0	—		—		12	0
O'Higgins	2024	Chilean Primera División	3	0	—		—		3	0
Career Total			112	0	4	0	9	0	125	0

== Honours ==
Universidad Católica

- Supercopa de Chile: 2019
- Friendlies: Torneo de Verano Fox Sports 2019
