= 2018 Club Deportivo Universidad Católica season =

78th season in existence of Club Deportivo Universidad Católica

Universidad Católica
2018 season
- President: Juan Tagle
- Head coach: Beñat San José
- Stadium: San Carlos de Apoquindo
- League: 1st
- Copa Chile: Second round
- Top goalscorer: League: Diego Buonanotte (7); All: Diego Buonanotte (7)
- Biggest win: Universidad Católica 3–1 Huachipato; Universidad Católica 3–1 Unión Española; Universidad Católica 3–1 Curicó Unido
- Biggest defeat: Universidad Católica 0–3 Huachipato
Home colours	Away colours	Third colours

The 2018 Club Deportivo Universidad Católica season was the 78th season and the club's 44th consecutive season in the top flight of Chilean football. In addition to the domestic league, Universidad Católica participated in the season's edition of the Copa Chile.

== Squad ==
No.	Player	Nationality	Position	Date of birth (age)	Year signed	Signed from
Goalkeepers
1	Matías Dituro	(Argentina)	GK	8 May 1987 (age 31)	2018	Bolívar
12	Marcelo Suárez	(Chile)	GK	21 August 2000 (age 18)	2018	Academy
17	Miguel Vargas	(Chile)	GK	15 June 1996 (age 22)	2015	Academy
Defenders
2	Germán Lanaro	(Argentina)	CB	21 March 1986 (age 32)	2015	Palestino
3	Germán Voboril	(Argentina)	LB / RB	5 May 1987 (age 31)	2017	Racing
4	Cristián Álvarez (captain)	(Chile)	RB / RWB	20 January 1980 (age 38)	2011	Universitario
5	Branco Ampuero	(Chile)	CB	19 July 1993 (age 25)	2017	Deportes Antofagasta
13	Benjamín Kuscevic	(Chile)	CB	2 May 1996 (age 22)	2014	Academy
15	Yerco Oyanedel	(Chile)	LB / RB	19 September 2000 (age 18)	2019	Academy
21	Raimundo Rebolledo	(Chile)	RB / RWB	14 May 1997 (age 21)	2015	Academy
29	Stefano Magnasco	(Chile)	RB / RWB	28 September 1992 (age 26)	2014	FC Groningen
Midfielders
6	César Fuentes	(Chile)	CM / DM	12 April 1993 (age 25)	2015	O'Higgins
8	Jaime Carreño	(Chile)	CM / DM	3 March 1997 (age 21)	2015	Academy
10	Diego Rojas	(Chile)	AM / CM	15 February 1995 (age 23)	2012	Academy
11	Luciano Aued	(Argentina)	AM / CM	1 March 1987 (age 31)	2017	Racing
18	Diego Buonanotte	(Argentina)	AM	19 April 1988 (age 30)	2016	AEK
20	Carlos Lobos	(Chile)	CM / DM	21 February 1997 (age 21)	2014	Academy
24	Ignacio Saavedra	(Chile)	CM / DM	12 January 1999 (age 19)	2018	Academy
Forwards
7	Sebastián Sáez	(Argentina)	ST	24 January 1985 (age 33)	2018	Emirates
9	David Llanos	(Chile)	ST	27 July 1989 (age 29)	2014	Huachipato
14	Andrés Vilches	(Chile)	ST	14 January 1992 (age 26)	2018	Colo-Colo
16	Marcos Bolados	(Chile)	RW	28 February 1996 (age 22)	2018	Colo-Colo
19	José Pedro Fuenzalida	(Chile)	RB / RWB / RW	22 February 1985 (age 33)	2016	Boca Juniors
23	Brian Leiva	(Chile)	RW	21 February 1998 (age 20)	2017	Academy
27	César Munder	(Cuba)	RW	7 January 2000 (age 18)	2018	Academy
30	Diego Valencia	(Chile)	ST / RW	14 January 2000 (age 18)	2018	Academy
33	David Henríquez	(Chile)	ST	21 February 1999 (age 19)	2017	Academy
Player(s) on transfers/loan during this season
4	Fernando Cordero	(Chile)	LB / RB	26 August 1987 (age 31)	2012	Unión Española

== Transfers ==
=== In ===
Date	Pos.	Name	From	Type	Ref.
12 December 2017	MF	(Chile) Jaime Carreño	Everton	End of loan	
12 December 2017	MF	(Chile) Diego Rojas	Palestino	End of loan	
12 December 2017	DF	(Chile) Raimundo Rebolledo	Curicó Unido	End of loan	
12 December 2017	GK	(Chile) Miguel Vargas	Deportes Santa Cruz	End of loan	
29 May 2018	FW	(Argentina) Sebastián Sáez	(United Arab Emirates) Emirates Club	Free transfer	

=== Out ===
Date	Pos.	Name	To	Type	Ref.
4 December 2017	GK	(Argentina) Franco Costanzo	-	Retirated	
15 December 2017	FW	(Uruguay) Santiago Silva	(Argentina) Talleres	Contract terminated	
31 December 2017	FW	(Chile) Jeisson Vargas	(Canada) Montreal Impact	End of loan	
1 January 2018	DF	(Chile) Vicente Starikoff	Deportes Recoleta	Contract terminated	
3 January 2018	DF	(Chile) Fabián Monilla	(Mexico) Toluca	Contract terminated	
19 February 2018	MF	(Chile) Carlos Espinosa	Curicó Unido	Contract terminated	
25 June 2018	FW	(Chile) Pedro Campos	(Mexico) Club Necaxa	Transfer	
4 July 2018	DF	(Chile) Fernando Cordero	(Argentina) San Martín de Tucumán	Contract terminated	

=== Loans in ===
Date	Pos.	Name	From	Type	Ref.
11 January 2018	FW	(Chile) Marcos Bolados	Colo-Colo	End of season	
12 January 2018	FW	(Chile) Andrés Vilches	Colo-Colo	End of season	
14 January 2018	GK	(Argentina) Matías Dituro	(Bolivia) Bolivar	End of season	

=== Loans out ===
Date	Pos.	Name	To	Type	Ref.
19 December 2017	GK	(Chile) Cristopher Toselli	(Mexico) Atlas	End of season	
5 January 2018	MF	(Chile) Fabián Manzano	Palestino	End of season	
1 January 2018	MF	(Chile) Manuel Reyes	Rangers	End of season	
1 January 2018	FW	(Chile) Sebastián Pérez	Rangers	End of season	
8 January 2018	DF	(Chile) Juan Espinoza	O'Higgins	End of season	
11 January 2018	FW	(Chile) José Luis Muñoz	Palestino	End of season	
18 January 2018	GK	(Chile) Francisco Garrido	Deportes Melipilla	End of season	
29 January 2018	DF	(Chile) Benjamín Vidal	Palestino	End of season	
14 February 2018	MF	(Chile) Lukas Soza	Deportes Copiapó	End of season	
20 February 2018	MF	(Chile) Gonzalo Jara	Unión La Calera	30 June 2018	
22 February 2018	FW	(Chile) Diego Vallejos	Palestino	End of season	
1 March 2018	FW	(Chile) Matías Rosas	Deportes Puerto Montt	End of season	
22 June 2018	GK	(Chile) Álvaro Ogalde	Deportes Limache	End of season	
17 July 2018	MF	(Chile) Andrés Souper	Deportes Valdivia	End of season	
19 July 2018	MF	(Chile) Gonzalo Jara	Barnechea	End of season	
9 August 2018	DF	(Chile) Vicente Fernández	Unión La Calera	End of season	

== Competitions ==
=== Overview ===
Competition	First match	Last match	Starting round	Final position	Record							
Competition	First match	Last match	Starting round	Final position	Pld	W	D	L	GF	GA	GD	Win %
League	2 February 2018	2 December 2018	Matchday 1	Winners	30	17	10	3	39	25	+14	56.67
Copa Chile	10 June 2018	17 June 2018	Second round	Second round	2	1	0	1	2	3	−1	50.00
Total					32	18	10	4	41	28	+13	56.25

Source: Soccerway

=== Primera Division ===
==== League table ====
Pos	Team	Pld	W	D	L	GF	GA	GD	Pts	Qualification
1	Universidad Católica (C)	30	17	10	3	39	25	+14	61	Qualification to Copa Libertadores group stage
2	Universidad de Concepción	30	18	4	8	44	31	+13	58	Qualification to Copa Libertadores group stage
3	Universidad de Chile	30	18	3	9	46	37	+9	57	Qualification to Copa Libertadores second stage
4	Deportes Antofagasta	30	14	11	5	48	33	+15	53	Qualification to Copa Sudamericana first stage
5	Colo-Colo	30	12	7	11	40	38	+2	43	Qualification to Copa Sudamericana first stage

Source: ANFP, Soccerway
Rules for classification: 1) Points, 2) Goal difference, 3) Matches won, 4) Goals for, 5) Away goals for, 6) Red cards, 7) Yellow cards, 8) Drawing of lots.
In case there are two teams tied in points for first place: 2) Playoff game.
(C) Champions

==== Results summary ====
Overall								Home						Away					
Pld	W	D	L	GF	GA	GD	Pts	W	D	L	GF	GA	GD	W	D	L	GF	GA	GD
30	17	10	3	39	25	+14	61	12	3	0	24	10	+14	5	7	3	15	15	0

Source: Primera Division

==== Results by round ====
Round	1	2	3	4	5	6	7	8	9	10	11	12	13	14	15	16	17	18	19	20	21	22	23	24	25	26	27	28	29	30
Ground	H	A	A	H	A	H	A	H	A	H	A	H	H	A	H	H	A	H	A	H	A	A	H	H	A	H	A	A	H	A
Result	W	W	W	W	W	W	L	W	W	W	D	W	D	D	D	D	D	W	D	W	D	D	W	W	L	W	L	D	W	W
Position	7	1	1	1	1	1	1	1	1	1	1	1	1	1	1	2	1	1	1	1	1	1	1	1	1	1	1	1	1	1

Source: Primera Division
A = Away; H = Home; W = Win; D = Draw; L = Loss

==== Matches ====
2 February 2018 1	Universidad Católica	2:1	Deportes Temuco	Las Condes
20:00	Hauche 3' (o.g.); Aued 51' (pen.)	Report	56' (o.g.) Dituro	Stadium: San Carlos; Attendance: 9.756; Referee: César Deischler

11 February 2018 2	Curicó Unido	1:3	Universidad Católica	Curicó
18:00	Cortés 46'	Report	Aued 23' (pen.); Llanos 45'; Lanaro 67'	Stadium: La Granja; Attendance: 4.329; Referee: Héctor Jona

17 February 2018 3	Everton	0:1	Universidad Católica	Viña del Mar
12:00		Report	Llanos 19'	Stadium: Sausalito; Attendance: 6.524; Referee: Cristián Andaur

24 February 2018 4	Universidad Católica	1:0	Unión La Calera	Las Condes
20:30	Buonanotte 71'	Report		Stadium: San Carlos; Attendance: 9.406; Referee: Piero Maza

4 March 2018 5	Deportes Iquique	0:1	Universidad Católica	Calama
18:00		Report	Fuentes 84'	Stadium: Zorros del Desierto; Attendance: 1.940; Referee: Felipe González

18 March 2018 6	Universidad Católica	3:1	Unión Española	Las Condes
20:30	Fuenzalida 7'; Henríquez 53'; Llanos 90+4'	Report	Figueroa 31'	Stadium: San Carlos; Attendance: 11.314; Referee: César Deischler

31 March 2018 7	Colo-Colo	1:0	Universidad Católica	Macul
12:30	Valdés 42' (pen.)	Report		Stadium: Monumental; Attendance: 29.004; Referee: Julio Bascuñán

8 April 2018 8	Universidad Católica	2:1	Palestino	Las Condes
17:30	Buonanotte 9'; Lobos 45+3'	Report	Gutiérrez 40' (pen.)	Stadium: San Carlos; Attendance: 10.637; Referee: César Deischler

14 April 201 9	O'Higgins F.C.	0:1	Universidad Católica	Rancagua
15:00		Report	Aued 10' (pen.)	Stadium: El Teniente; Attendance: 8.664; Referee: Francisco Gilabert

22 April 2018 10	Universidad Católica	1:0	Audax Italiano	Las Condes
17:30	Llanos 79'	Report		Stadium: San Carlos; Attendance: 11.055; Referee: Felipe González

29 April 2018 11	San Luis	1:1	Universidad Católica	Quillota
20:00	Caballero 51'	Report	Lobos 59'	Stadium: Lucio Fariña Fernández; Attendance: 4.812; Referee: Christian Rojas

5 May 2018 12	Universidad Católica	3:1	C.D. Huachipato	Las Condes
20:00	Fuenzalida 24'; Buonanotte 69'; Llanos 75'	Report	Torres 34'	Stadium: San Carlos; Attendance: 10.696; Referee: Piero Maza

13 May 2018 13	Universidad Católica	1:1	Universidad de Chile	Las Condes
12:00	Buonanotte 45'	Report	Pinilla 65'	Stadium: San Carlos; Attendance: 12.282; Referee: Roberto Tobar

20 May 2018 14	Universidad de Concepción	0:0	Universidad Católica	Concepción
17:30		Report		Stadium: Ester Roa; Attendance: 17.715; Referee: Francisco Gilabert

26 May 2018 15	Universidad Católica	0:0	Deportes Antofagasta	Las Condes
20:00		Report		Stadium: San Carlos; Attendance: 10.572; Referee: Felipe González

21 July 2018 16	Universidad Católica	2:2	Deportes Iquique	Las Condes
17:30	Buonanotte 34'; Fuenzalida 39' (pen.)	Report	Salinas 28'; Bustamante 44'	Stadium: San Carlos; Attendance: 8.133; Referee: Piero Maza

28 July 2018 17	Palestino	2:2	Universidad Católica	La Cisterna
12:00	Campos López 27', 74'	Report	Buonanotte 54'; Sáez 82'	Stadium: Municipal; Attendance: 3.478; Referee: Julio Bascuñán

4 August 2018 18	Universidad Católica	2:1	Everton	Las Condes
17:30	Sáez 50', 69'	Report	Suárez 16' (pen.)	Stadium: San Carlos; Attendance: 9.570; Referee: Felípe González

11 August 2018 19	Unión La Calera	2:2	Universidad Católica	Viña del Mar
15:00	Núñez 31' (pen.); Abán 89'	Report	Aued 62'; Lanaro 68'	Stadium: Sausalito; Attendance: 5.675; Referee: Roberto Tobar

19 August 2018 20	Universidad Católica	2:1	Curicó Unido	Las Condes
17:30	Munder 43'; Sáez 78'	Report	Vargas 22'	Stadium: San Carlos; Attendance: 10.739; Referee: Francisco Gilabert

26 August 2018 21	Audax Italiano	0:0	Universidad Católica	La Florida
20:00		Report		Stadium: Municipal; Attendance: 7.642; Referee: Eduardo Gamboa

1 September 2018 22	Unión Española	1:1	Universidad Católica	Independencia
17:30	Tello 90+1'	Report	Lobos 31'	Stadium: Santa Laura; Attendance: 8.058; Referee: Piero Maza

22 September 2018 23	Universidad Católica	2:1	San Luis	Las Condes
20:00	Fuenzalida 76'; Buonanotte 83'	Report	Rodríguez 37'	Stadium: San Carlos; Attendance: 9.877; Referee: Christian Rojas

30 September 2018 24	Universidad Católica	1:0	Colo-Colo	Las Condes
12:00	Aued 56' (pen.)	Report		Stadium: San Carlos; Attendance: 12.196; Referee: Eduardo Gamboa

6 October 2018 25	C.D. Huachipato	3:0	Universidad Católica	Talcahuano
17:30	Parraguez 59', 85'; Torres 90+4'	Report		Stadium: Estadio CAP; Attendance: 6.460; Referee: Julio Bascuñán

20 October 2018 26	Universidad Católica	1:0	Universidad de Concepción	Las Condes
20:00	Vilches 63'	Report		Stadium: San Carlos; Attendance: 12.249; Referee: Eduardo Gamboa

27 October 2018 27	Universidad de Chile	2:0	Universidad Católica	Ñuñoa
12:00	Vaz 41'; Soteldo 78'	Report		Stadium: Nacional; Attendance: 44.102; Referee: Piero Maza

4 November 2018 28	Deportes Antofagasta	1:1	Universidad Católica	Antofagasta
15:30	Becker 2'	Report	Sáez 50'	Stadium: Calvo y Bascuñán; Attendance: 8.201; Referee: Eduardo Gamboa

25 November 2018 29	Universidad Católica	1:0	O'Higgins F.C.	Las Condes
17:30	Fuenzalida 45+2'	Report		Stadium: San Carlos; Attendance: 12.687; Referee: Roberto Tobar

2 December 2018 30	Deportes Temuco	1:2	Universidad Católica	Temuco
17:30	Aceval 15' (pen.)	Report	Carreño 54'; Vilches 69'	Stadium: Germán Becker; Attendance: 14.874; Referee: Piero Maza

=== Copa Chile ===
==== Second round ====
10 June 2018	Cobreloa	1–2	Universidad Católica	Calama
17:30	Romero 61'	Report	Llanos 19'; Aued 24' (pen.)	Stadium: Estadio Zorros del Desierto; Attendance: 4,293; Referee: Fabián Aracena

17 June 2018	Universidad Católica	0–2	Cobreloa	Las Condes, Santiago
16:15		Report	Parra 13'; Simón 40'	Stadium: Estadio San Carlos de Apoquindo; Attendance: 5,303; Referee: Ángelo Hermosilla

== Statistics ==
=== Squad statistics ===
No.	Pos	Nat	Player	Total		League		Copa Chile	
No.	Pos	Nat	Player	Apps	Goals	Apps	Goals	Apps	Goals
1	GK	(Argentina)	Matías Dituro	32	0	30	0	2	0
2	DF	(Argentina)	Germán Lanaro	28	0	26	0	2	0
3	DF	(Argentina)	Germán Voboril	17	2	16	2	1	0
4	DF	(Chile)	Cristián Álvarez	10	0	9	0	1	0
6	MF	(Chile)	César Fuentes	17	1	16	1	1	0
6	FW	(Chile)	Sebastián Sáez	15	5	15	5	0	0
8	MF	(Chile)	Jaime Carreño	14	1	14	1	0	0
8	MF	(Chile)	Ignacio Saavedra	13	0	13	0	0	0
9	FW	(Argentina)	David Llanos	21	6	19	5	2	1
10	MF	(Chile)	Diego Rojas	20	0	18	0	2	0
11	DF	(Chile)	Fernando Cordero	7	0	7	0	0	0
11	MF	(Argentina)	Luciano Aued	30	6	28	5	2	1
13	DF	(Argentina)	Benjamín Kuscevic	22	0	22	0	0	0
14	FW	(Chile)	Andrés Vilches	19	2	18	2	1	0
16	FW	(Chile)	Marcos Bolados	19	0	18	0	1	0
17	DF	(Chile)	Branco Ampuero	18	0	16	0	2	0
18	MF	(Argentina)	Diego Buonanotte	27	7	26	7	1	0
19	DF	(Chile)	José Pedro Fuenzalida	31	5	29	5	2	0
20	FW	(Cuba)	César Munder	16	1	14	1	2	0
20	FW	(Chile)	Carlos Lobos	13	3	11	3	2	0
21	DF	(Chile)	Raimundo Rebolledo	23	0	21	0	2	0
29	DF	(Chile)	Stefano Magnasco	14	0	14	0	0	0
30	FW	(Chile)	Diego Valencia	3	0	2	0	1	0
33	FW	(Chile)	David Henríquez	13	1	12	1	1	0

Last updated: December 2018
Source: Soccerway

^{†} Player left Universidad Católica during the season

=== Goals ===
Rank	No.	Pos.	Nat.	Player	League	Copa Chile	Total
1	18	MF	(Argentina)	Diego Buonanotte	7	0	7
2	9	MF	(Chile)	David Llanos	5	1	6
2	11	MF	(Argentina)	Luciano Aued	5	1	6
4	19	DF	(Chile)	José Pedro Fuenzalida	5	0	5
4	7	MF	(Argentina)	Sebastián Sáez	5	0	5
6	20	FW	(Chile)	Carlos Lobos	3	0	3
7	14	FW	(Chile)	Andrés Vilches	2	0	2
7	2	DF	(Chile)	Germán Lanaro	2	0	2
9	6	MF	(Chile)	César Fuentes	1	0	1
9	16	FW	(Chile)	César Munder	1	0	1
9	33	FW	(Chile)	David Henríquez	1	0	1
9	8	MF	(Chile)	Jaime Carreño	1	0	1
9				Own goal	1	0	1
Total					39	2	41

- Last updated: December 2018
- Source: Soccerway

=== Assists ===
Rank	No.	Pos.	Nat.	Player	League	Copa Chile	Total
1	9	MF	(Chile)	David Llanos	3	0	3
1	10	MF	(Chile)	Diego Rojas	3	0	3
3	18	MF	(Argentina)	Diego Buonanotte	2	0	2
3	19	DF	(Chile)	José Pedro Fuenzalida	2	0	2
3	21	DF	(Chile)	Raimundo Rebolledo	2	0	2
3	16	FW	(Chile)	Marcos Bolados	2	0	2
7	11	MF	(Argentina)	Luciano Aued	1	0	1
7	14	FW	(Chile)	Andrés Vilches	1	0	1
7	27	FW	(Chile)	César Munder	1	0	1
7	3	DF	(Argentina)	Germán Voboril	1	0	1
7	4	DF	(Chile)	Cristián Álvarez	1	0	1
7	29	DF	(Chile)	Stefano Magnasco	1	0	1
7	30	FW	(Chile)	Diego Valencia	1	0	1
Total					21	0	21

- Last updated: December 2018
- Source: Soccerway

=== Clean sheets ===
Rank	No.	Pos.	Nat.	Name	League	Copa Chile	Total
1	1	GK	(Argentina)	Matías Dituro	11	0	11
Total					11	0	0

*Last updated: December 2018
- Source: Soccerway
