= Raimundo Rebolledo =

Chilean footballer (born 1997)

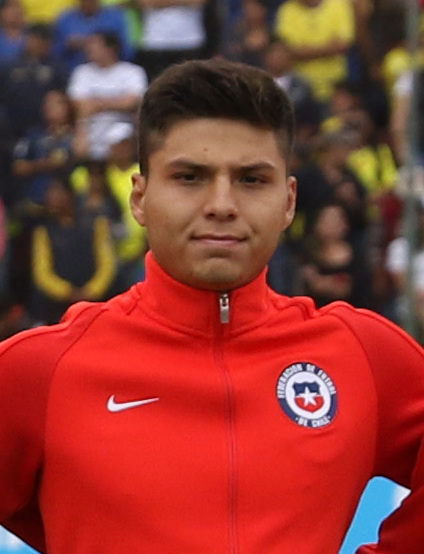
- Rebolledo with Chile U20 in 2017

Personal information
- Full name: Raimundo Andrés Rebolledo Valenzuela
- Date of birth: 14 May 1997 (age 29)
- Place of birth: Concepción, Chile
- Height: 1.71 m (5 ft 7 1/2 in)
- Position: Full-back

Team information
- Current team: Audax Italiano
- Number: 35

Youth career
- 2010–2015: Universidad Católica

Senior career*
Years	Team	Apps	(Gls)
2015–2022	Universidad Católica	96	(1)
2017	→ Curicó Unido (loan)	12	(0)
2023	Ñublense	21	(0)
2024	Unión La Calera	23	(0)
2025	Everton	14	(0)
2026–	Audax Italiano	0	(0)

International career^{‡}
2015–2017	Chile U20	4	(0)
2019–2020	Chile U23	5	(0)
- * Club domestic league appearances and goals as of 31 December 2025 ‡ National team caps and goals as of 31 January 2020

Raimundo Andrés Rebolledo Valenzuela (born 14 May 1997) is a Chilean footballer who plays as full back for Audax Italiano.

== Club career ==
Rebolledo made his debut at UC in a 2016 Copa Chile match against Santiago Morning.

In 2024, Rebolledo joined Unión La Calera from Ñublense. The next year, he switched to Everton de Viña del Mar.

On 19 February 2026, Rebolledo joined Audax Italiano.

== International career ==
Along with Chile U20, he won the L'Alcúdia Tournament in 2015.

Rebolledo represented Chile U20 at the South American Youth Football Championship and Chile U23 at the 2020 Pre-Olympic Tournament. In both championships, Chile did not qualify for the second stage.

In February 2020, he was called up to a training microcycle of the Chile senior team.

== Personal life ==
He is nicknamed Catuto.

== Career statistics ==
=== Club ===
As of 18 June 2022

Club	Season	League			National Cup		Continental		Other		Total	
Club	Season	Division	Apps	Goals	Apps	Goals	Apps	Goals	Apps	Goals	Apps	Goals
Universidad Católica	2016-17	C. Primera División	—		2	0	—		—		2	0
Universidad Católica	2018	C. Primera División	21	0	2	0	—		—		23	0
Universidad Católica	2019	C. Primera División	15	0	3	0	3 (Note: 2 appearances in the Copa Libertadores, 1 in the Copa Sudamericana)	0	—		21	0
Universidad Católica	2020	C. Primera División	29	0	—		11 (Note: 5 appearances in the Copa Libertadores, 6 in the Copa Sudamericana)	0	1 (Note: Appearance(s) in the Supercopa de Chile)	0	41	0
Universidad Católica	2021	C. Primera División	18	0	4	0	7 (Note: Appearance(s) in the Copa Libertadores)	0	—		29	0
Universidad Católica	2022	C. Primera División	7	1	1	0	5	0	—		13	1
Universidad Católica	Total club		90	1	12	0	26	0	1	0	129	1
Curicó Unido (loan)	2017	C. Primera División	12	0	5	0	—		—		17	0
Career total			102	1	17	0	26	0	1	0	146	1

== Honours ==
Universidad Católica

- Primera División de Chile: 2016–C, 2016–A, 2018, 2019, 2020, 2021
- Supercopa de Chile: 2016, 2019, 2020, 2021

Chile U20

- L'Alcúdia International Tournament (1): 2015
