= Carlos Lobos (footballer) =

Chilean footballer (born 1997)

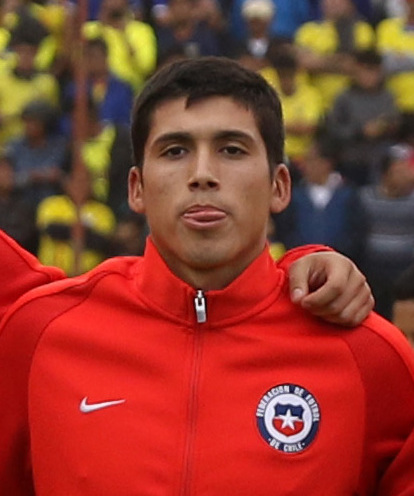
- Lobos with Chile U20 in 2017

Personal information
- Full name: Carlos Alberto Lobos Ubilla
- Date of birth: 21 February 1997 (age 29)
- Place of birth: Santiago, Chile
- Height: 1.73 m (5 ft 8 in)
- Position: Central midfielder

Team information
- Current team: Santiago City

Youth career
- 2010–2015: Universidad Católica

Senior career*
Years	Team	Apps	(Gls)
2014–2019	Universidad Católica	50	(7)
2020–2021	Everton	23	(1)
2021–2023	Huachipato	20	(0)
2024	Deportes La Serena	19	(2)
2025	Rangers	24	(0)
2026–	Santiago City	0	(0)

International career
2013	Chile U17	1	(0)
2017	Chile U20	2	(0)
- * Club domestic league appearances and goals as of 27 January 2026

Carlos Alberto Lobos Ubilla (born 21 February 1997) is a Chilean footballer who plays as a central midfielder for Santiago City.

== Club career ==
Carlos made his debut at UC entered for the first time against Universidad de Concepcion in San Carlos de Apoquindo in 2014.

In 2024, Lobos joined Deportes La Serena in the Primera B from Huachipato. He switched to Rangers de Talca for the 2025 season.

In February 2026, Lobos joined Santiago City in the Segunda División Profesional de Chile.

== Honors ==
Universidad Católica

- Primera División de Chile (4): 2016–A, 2016–C, 2018, 2019
- Supercopa de Chile (2): 2016, 2019

Deportes La Serena

- Primera B de Chile (1): 2024
