= 2018 in Chilean football =

== 2018 ==
24 March Friendly	Sweden	1–2	Chile	Solna, Sweden
18:00 UTC+1	Toivonen 23'	Report	Vidal 22'; Bolados 90'	Stadium: Friends Arena; Attendance: 48,134; Referee: Anthony Taylor (England)

27 March Friendly	Denmark	0–0	Chile	Aalborg, Denmark
18:00 UTC+1		Report		Stadium: Aalborg Stadium; Attendance: 11,527; Referee: John Beaton (Scotland)

31 May Friendly	Romania	3–2	Chile	Graz, Austria
16:00 UTC+2	Stanciu 13'; Deac 66'; Budescu 84'	Report	Maripán 32'; Reyes 52'	Stadium: Sportzentrum Graz-Weinzödl; Referee: Christopher Jäger (Austria)

4 June Friendly	Serbia	0–1	Chile	Graz, Austria
20:00 UTC+2		Report	Maripán 88'	Stadium: Liebenauer Stadium; Referee: Alexander Harkam (Austria)

8 June Friendly	Poland	2–2	Chile	Poznań, Poland
21:45 UTC+2	Lewandowski 30'; Zieliński 34'	Report	Valdés 38'; Albornoz 56'	Stadium: INEA Stadion; Referee: Paolo Mazzoleni (Italy)

11 September Friendly	South Korea	0–0	Chile	Suwon, South Korea
20:00 UTC+9		Report		Stadium: Suwon World Cup Stadium; Attendance: 40,127; Referee: Ryuji Sato (Japan)

12 October Friendly	Peru	3–0	Chile	Miami, United States
20:00 UTC−4	Roco 64' (o.g.); Aquino 75', 86'	Report		Stadium: Hard Rock Stadium; Referee: Armando Villarreal (United States)

16 October Friendly	Mexico	0–1	Chile	Querétaro, Mexico
20:45 UTC−6		Report	Castillo 89'	Stadium: Estadio Corregidora; Attendance: 40,000; Referee: Joel Aguilar (El Salvador)

16 November Friendly	Chile	2–3	Costa Rica	Rancagua, Chile
21:15 UTC−3	Vegas 70'; Sánchez 90'	Report	Waston 36', 59'; Matarrita 64'	Stadium: Estadio El Teniente; Referee: Germán Delfino (Argentina)

20 November Friendly	Chile	4–1	Honduras	Temuco, Chile
21:15 UTC−3	Vidal 8', 35' (pen.); Sánchez 61'; Castillo 84' (pen.)	Report	López 40'	Stadium: Estadio Germán Becker; Referee: Michael Espinoza (Peru)
