= Germán Lanaro =

Argentine footballer (born 1986)

Personal information
- Full name: Germán Andrés Lanaro Contreras
- Date of birth: 21 March 1986 (age 40)
- Place of birth: Villa Regina, Rio Negro, Argentina
- Height: 1.86 m (6 ft 1 in)
- Position: Defender

Team information
- Current team: Nueva Chicago (manager)

Youth career
- 2001–2006: Huracán

Senior career*
Years	Team	Apps	(Gls)
2007–2008	Huracán	4	(0)
2008–2009	Guillermo Brown	21	(1)
2009–2010	Villa Mitre	29	(0)
2010–2013	Almagro	92	(8)
2013–2014	Nueva Chicago	36	(2)
2014–2015	Palestino	25	(3)
2015–2022	Universidad Católica	142	(7)
Total		349	(21)

Managerial career
- 2023–2024: Argentinos Juniors (assistant)
- 2025: Puebla (assistant)
- 2026: Deportes La Serena (assistant)
- 2026–: Nueva Chicago
- * Club domestic league appearances and goals

Germán Andrés Lanaro Contreras (Note: In this Spanish name, the first or paternal surname is Lanaro and the second or maternal family name is Contreras.) (born March 21, 1986, in Villa Regina, Rio Negro), known as Germán Lanaro, is an Argentine-Chilean retired footballer. He is the current manager of Nueva Chicago.

== Playing career ==
His last club was Universidad Católica in 2022.

== Coaching career ==
Lanaro started his career as assistant coach of Pablo Guede in Argentinos Juniors and Puebla. In December 2025, he joined the technical staff of Felipe Gutiérrez in Deportes La Serena.

In May 2026, Lanaro left Deportes La Serena and assumed as the head coach of Nueva Chicago.

== Personal life ==
He's the twin brother of Gustavo Lanaro. They both naturalized Chilean by descent, since their grandmother is Chilean.

== Career statistics ==
=== Club ===
As of 24 April 2022

Club	Season	League			National Cup		Continental		Other		Total	
Club	Season	Division	Apps	Goals	Apps	Goals	Apps	Goals	Apps	Goals	Apps	Goals
Huracán	2007-2008	Primera B Metro	0	0	4	0	—		—		4	0
Guillermo Brown	2008-2009	Primera B Metro	21	1	—		—		—		21	1
Villa Mitre	2009-2010	Primera B Metro	29	0	—		—		—		29	0
Almagro	2010-2012	Primera B Metro	53	5	—		—		—		53	5
Almagro	2013	Primera B Metro	39	3	—		—		—		39	3
Almagro	Total		92	8	—		—		—		92	8
Nueva Chicago	2013-2014	Primera B Metro	36	2	1	0	—		—		37	2
Palestino	2014-15	Primera División	25	3	6	3	8 (Note: Appearance(s) in the Copa Sudamericana)	0	—		25	3
Universidad Católica	2015-16	Primera División	27	0	4	0	3	0	1 (Note: Appearance(s) in the Supercopa de Chile)	0	33	0
Universidad Católica	2016-17	Primera División	19	3	8	1	—		—		27	4
Universidad Católica	2017	Primera División	12	0	3	1	2 (Note: Appearance(s) in the Copa Libertadores)	0	1	0	18	1
Universidad Católica	2018	Primera División	26	2	2	0	—		—		28	2
Universidad Católica	2019	Primera División	19	1	2	0	6 (Note: 4 appearances in the Copa Libertadores, 2 in the Copa Sudamericana)	0	1	0	28	1
Universidad Católica	2020	Primera División	13	0	1	0	9 (Note: 4 appearances in the Copa Libertadores, 5 in the Copa Sudamericana)	0	—		23	0
Universidad Católica	2021	Primera División	18	1	1	0	2	0	1	0	22	1
Universidad Católica	2022	Primera División	5	0	-	-	-	-	—		5	0
Universidad Católica	Total		139	7	21	2	22	0	4	0	185	9
Career total			342	21	32	5	30	0	4	0	408	27

== Honours ==
Universidad Católica

- Primera División de Chile: 2016–C, 2016–A, 2018, 2019, 2020, 2021
- Supercopa de Chile: 2016, 2019, 2020, 2021
