= Diego Rojas =

Chilean footballer (born 1995)

Personal information
- Full name: Diego Nicolás Rojas Orellana
- Date of birth: 15 February 1995 (age 31)
- Place of birth: Antofagasta, Chile
- Height: 1.64 m (5 ft 4 1/2 in)
- Position: Attacking midfielder

Team information
- Current team: Deportes Antofagasta
- Number: 10

Youth career
- 2005–2009: Deportes Antofagasta
- 2009–2013: Universidad Católica

Senior career*
Years	Team	Apps	(Gls)
2012–2019	Universidad Católica	69	(7)
2016–2017	→ Everton (loan)	12	(1)
2017	→ Palestino (loan)	11	(0)
2019	→ Unión La Calera (loan)	3	(0)
2020–2021	Unión La Calera	0	(0)
2020–2021	→ Deportes Valdivia (loan)	16	(1)
2021–2022	San Luis	27	(1)
2022–2023	SJK	47	(6)
2024–2025	Curicó Unido	52	(6)
2025–	Deportes Antofagasta	0	(0)

International career^{‡}
2011	Chile U17	1	(0)
2013–2015	Chile U20	6	(1)
- * Club domestic league appearances and goals as of 9 January 2026 ‡ National team caps and goals as of 22 January 2015

Diego Nicolás Rojas Orellana (born 15 February 1995) is a Chilean footballer who plays as an attacking midfielder for Deportes Antofagasta.

== Club career ==
Rojas debuts at UC in the national tournament play from the 55 minute to Cobresal.

On 1 February 2022, Rojas signed with SJK in Finland.

He returned to his homeland for the 2024 season and signed with Curicó Unido in the Primera B.

In January 2026, Rojas signed with Deportes Antofagasta.

== International career ==
Rojas represented Chile U20 at the 2014 Aspire Four Nations International Tournament in Qatar.

== Career statistics ==
As of 27 November 2024.

Appearances and goals by club, season and competition
Club	Season	League			Cup (Note: Includes Copa Chile and Suomen Cup)		Continental		Other		Total	
Club	Season	Division	Apps	Goals	Apps	Goals	Apps	Goals	Apps	Goals	Apps	Goals
Universidad Católica	2012	Chilean Primera División	1	0	2	0	–		–		3	0
Universidad Católica	2013	Chilean Primera División	9	1	4	0	–		–		13	1
Universidad Católica	2014	Chilean Primera División	16	2	2	1	0	0	–		18	3
Universidad Católica	2015	Chilean Primera División	25	4	7	2	3 (Note: Includes Copa Sudamericana)	0	–		35	6
Universidad Católica	2016	Chilean Primera División	0	0	0	0	–		–		0	0
Universidad Católica	2017	Chilean Primera División	0	0	0	0	–		–		0	0
Universidad Católica	2018	Chilean Primera División	18	0	2	0	0	0	–		20	0
Universidad Católica	Total		69	7	17	3	3	0	–	–	89	10
Everton (loan)	2016	Chilean Primera División	12	1	4	1	0	0	–		16	2
Palestino (loan)	2017	Chilean Primera División	11	0	1	0	–		–		12	0
Unión La Calera (loan)	2019	Chilean Primera División	3	0	2	1	–		–		5	1
Unión La Calera	2020	Chilean Primera División	0	0	0	0	–		–		0	0
Deportes Valdivia (loan)	2020	Primera B de Chile	16	1	0	0	–		–		16	1
San Luis	2021	Primera B de Chile	28	1	2	0	–		–		30	1
SJK	2022	Veikkausliiga	23	3	1	0	3 (Note: Includes UEFA Europa Conference League)	1	3 (Note: Includes Finnish League Cup)	1	30	5
SJK	2023	Veikkausliiga	24	3	1	0	–		5	0	30	3
SJK	Total		47	6	2	0	3	1	8	1	60	8
Curicó Unido	2024	Primera B de Chile	26	4	2	0	–		–		28	4
Career total			212	20	30	5	6	1	8	1	256	27

== Honors ==
Universidad Católica

- Primera División de Chile: 2016 Clausura, 2018
- Supercopa de Chile: 2019
