= Fernando Cordero (footballer) =

Chilean footballer (born 1987)

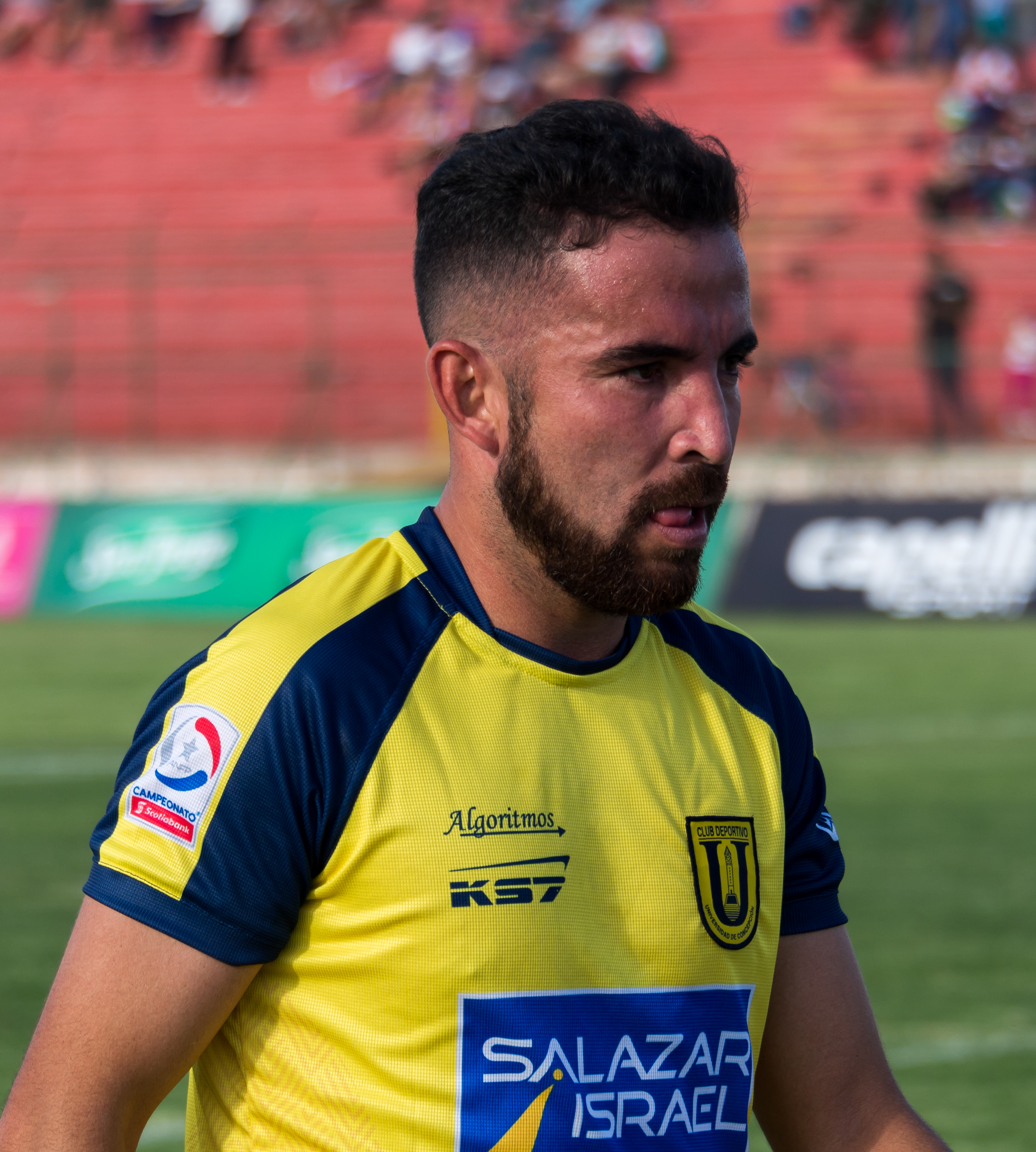
- Cordero with Universidad de Concepción in 2019

Personal information
- Full name: Fernando Patricio Cordero Fonseca
- Date of birth: 26 August 1987 (age 39)
- Place of birth: Santiago, Chile
- Height: 1.72 m (5 ft 8 in)
- Positions: Left back; midfielder

Youth career
- 2003–2009: Unión Española

Senior career*
| Years | Team | Apps | (Gls) |
| 2006–2012 | Unión Española | 150 | (23) |
| 2007 | → Curicó Unido (loan) | 37 | (2) |
| 2012–2018 | Universidad Católica | 175 | (10) |
| 2018 | San Martín Tucumán | 2 | (0) |
| 2019 | Universidad de Concepción | 20 | (2) |
| 2020–2021 | Unión La Calera | 26 | (2) |
| 2021–2022 | Ñublense | 48 | (1) |
| 2023 | Rangers | 17 | (1) |
| 2023 | Trasandino | 9 | (0) |
| 2024 | Deportes Linares | 12 | (0) |
| Total | | 496 | (41) |

International career
| 2014 | Chile | 1 | (0) |
- * Club domestic league appearances and goals

Fernando Patricio Cordero Fonseca (born 26 August 1987) is a Chilean former footballer who played as a left-back.

== Career ==
In July 2023, Cordero joined Trasandino in the Chilean Segunda División Profesional after being released from Rangers de Talca and looking for a chance to sign with another club by Instagram. The next season, he switched to Deportes Linares.

Cordero officially retired in 2025.

== Honours ==
Universidad Católica

- Primera División de Chile (3): 2016–C, 2016–A, 2018
- Supercopa de Chile: 2016
