= Benjamín Kuscevic =

Chilean footballer (born 1996)

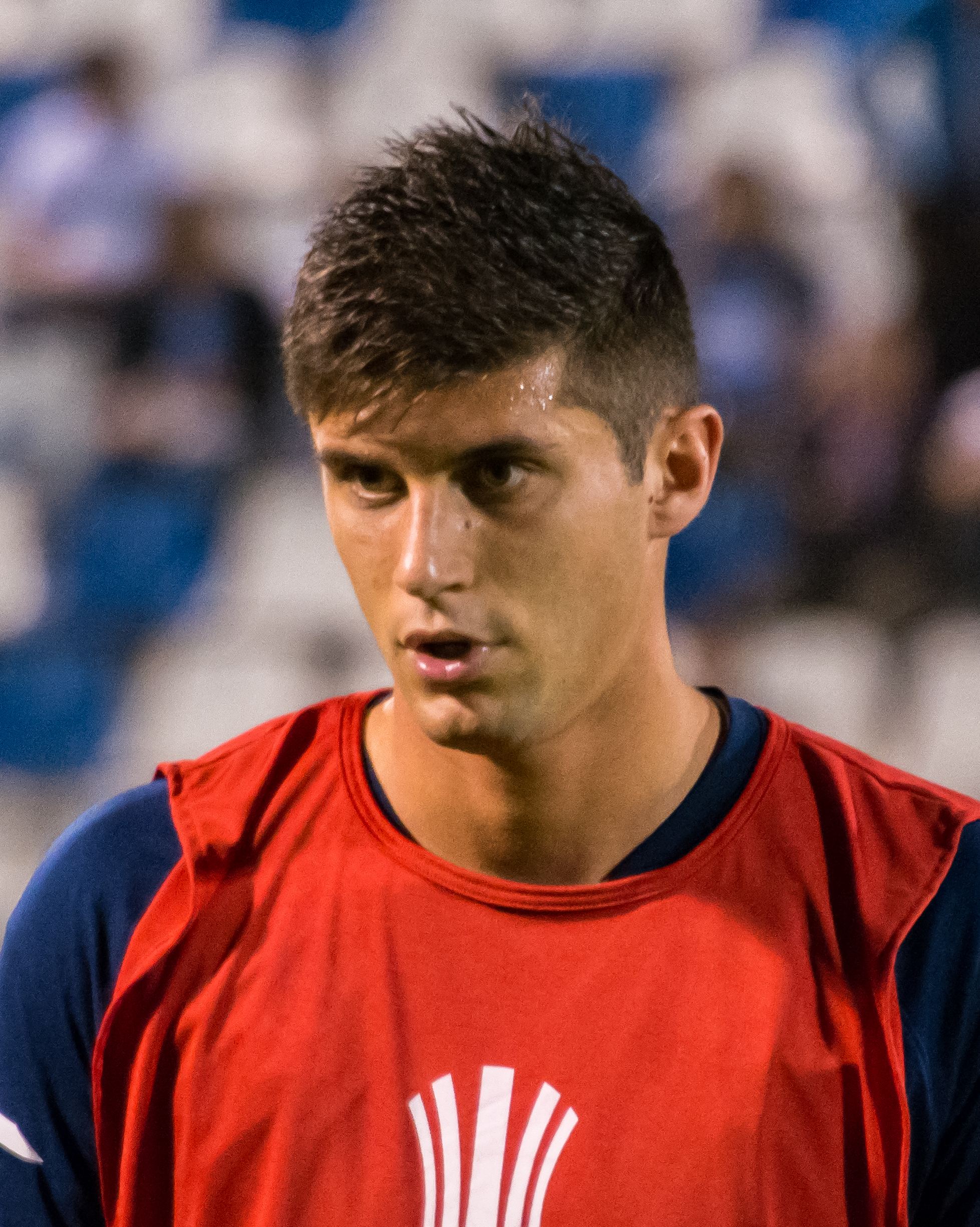
- Kuscevic with Universidad Católica in 2019

Personal information
- Full name: Benjamín Kuscevic Jaramillo
- Date of birth: 2 May 1996 (age 30)
- Place of birth: Santiago, Chile
- Height: 1.85 m (6 ft 1 in)
- Position: Centre-back

Team information
- Current team: Toronto FC (on loan from Fortaleza)
- Number: 13

Youth career
- 2011–2015: Universidad Católica
- 2014–2015: → Real Madrid (loan)

Senior career*
Years	Team	Apps	(Gls)
2014–2020	Universidad Católica	66	(3)
2020–2023	Palmeiras	39	(0)
2023–2024	Coritiba	28	(2)
2024	→ Fortaleza (loan)	27	(2)
2025–	Fortaleza	26	(1)
2026–	→ Toronto FC (loan)	19	(0)

International career^{‡}
2013	Chile U17	4	(0)
2014	Chile U20	3	(0)
2018–	Chile	16	(0)
- * Club domestic league appearances and goals as of 1 November 2026 ‡ National team caps and goals as of 30 March 2026

Benjamín Kuscevic Jaramillo (Croatian: Kuščević, Croatian pronunciation: [běːɲamin kûʃtʃeʋitɕ xaramîʎo]; born 2 May 1996) is a Chilean footballer who plays as a centre-back for Major League Soccer club Toronto FC, on loan from Campeonato Brasileiro Série B club Fortaleza, and the Chile national team.

== Club career ==
=== Universidad Católica ===
Kuscevic joined Universidad Católica's youth setup in 2011, from Unión Española. After progressing through the youth setup, he signed a professional contract with the club in 2013. Kuscevic made his first team debut on 18 May 2014, in a match against Curicó Unido for the 2014–15 Copa Chile.

==== Loan to Real Madrid ====
On 29 August 2014, Kuscevic moved on loan to Real Madrid for one year. The move was made official on 2 September, and he was initially assigned in the Juvenil A squad.

==== Return to Católica ====
In June 2015, Kuscevic returned to Católica and was definitely promoted to the main squad by manager Mario Salas. In his first division debut, he played the full game in a 4–2 win against Universidad de Concepción on 6 February 2016.

=== Palmeiras ===
On 4 November 2020, Kuscevic signed a five-year contract with Campeonato Brasileiro Série A side Palmeiras.

=== Coritiba ===
On 10 February 2023, Kuscevic moved to Coritiba from Palmeiras on a R$3m transfer deal. He signed a three-year contract until 31 December 2026.

=== Fortaleza ===
==== Loan to Toronto FC ====
On 5 March 2026, Kuscevic joined MLS club Toronto FC on a loan for the 2026 season with an option to purchase.

== International career ==
Kuscevic was eligible to play for either the Croatia or Chile national teams, due to his Croatian origins. After representing Chile at under-17 level, he was called to the full squad for friendlies against Serbia and Poland, but did not feature in either match.

Kuscevic made his full international debut on 20 November 2018, in a friendly against Honduras, after coming on as a late substitute for Gary Medel.

== Career statistics ==
=== Club ===
As of match played 1 November 2026

Appearances and goals by club, season and competition
Club	Season	League			State league (Note: Includes Campeonato Paulista, Campeonato Paranaense, Campeonato Cearense)		National cup (Note: Includes Copa Chile, Copa do Brasil)		Continental		Other		Total	
Club	Season	Division	Apps	Goals	Apps	Goals	Apps	Goals	Apps	Goals	Apps	Goals	Apps	Goals
Universidad Católica	2014–15	Chilean Primera División	—		—		1	0	—		—		1	0
Universidad Católica	2015–16	Chilean Primera División	5	0	—		1	0	1 (Note: Appearance(s) in Copa Sudamericana)	0	—		7	0
Universidad Católica	2016–17	Chilean Primera División	13	1	—		4	0	5 (Note: Four appearances in Copa Libertadores, one appearance in Copa Sudamericana)	0	—		22	1
Universidad Católica	2017	Chilean Primera División	6	1	—		3	0	—		1 (Note: Appearance in Supercopa de Chile)	1	10	2
Universidad Católica	2018	Chilean Primera División	22	0	—		—		—		—		22	0
Universidad Católica	2019	Chilean Primera División	13	0	—		5	1	6 (Note: Appearance(s) in Copa Libertadores)	0	1	1	25	2
Universidad Católica	2020	Chilean Primera División	7	1	—		—		2	0	—		9	1
Universidad Católica	Total		66	3	—		14	1	14	0	2	2	96	6
Palmeiras	2020	Série A	11	0	—		0	0	1	0	—		12	0
Palmeiras	2021	Série A	11	0	2	0	—		2	0	—		16	0
Palmeiras	2022	Série A	5	0	5	0	0	0	5	0	1 (Note: Appearance in Recopa Sudamericana)	0	16	0
Palmeiras	2023	Série A	—		5	0	—		—		0	0	5	0
Palmeiras	Total		27	0	12	0	0	0	8	0	1	0	48	0
Coritiba	2023	Série A	23	2	5	0	4	0	—		—		32	2
Fortaleza (loan)	2024	Série A	22	2	5	0	2	1	6	0	8 (Note: Appearances in Copa do Nordeste)	0	43	3
Fortaleza	2025	Série A	20	1	4	0	0	0	7	0	3	0	34	1
Fortaleza	2026	Série A	0	0	2	0	0	0	—		—		2	0
Fortaleza	Fortaleza total		42	3	11	0	2	1	13	0	11	0	79	4
Toronto FC (loan)	2026	Major League Soccer	19	0	—		0	0	—		—		19	0
Career total			177	8	28	1	20	1	35	0	14	2	297	12

=== International ===
As of match played 30 March 2026

Appearances and goals by national team and year
National team	Year	Apps	Goals
Chile	2018	1	0
Chile	2019	0	0
Chile	2020	0	0
Chile	2021	2	0
Chile	2022	4	0
Chile	2023	0	0
Chile	2024	3	0
Chile	2025	4	0
Chile	2026	2	0
Total		16	0

== Honours ==
Universidad Católica

- Primera División de Chile: 2016–C, 2016–A, 2018, 2019, 2020
- Supercopa de Chile: 2016, 2019

Palmeiras

- Copa Libertadores: 2020, 2021
- Recopa Sudamericana: 2022
- Campeonato Brasileiro Série A: 2022
- Copa do Brasil: 2020
- Campeonato Paulista: 2022

Fortaleza

- Copa do Nordeste: 2024
