= Diego Buonanotte =

Argentine-Chilean footballer (born 1988)

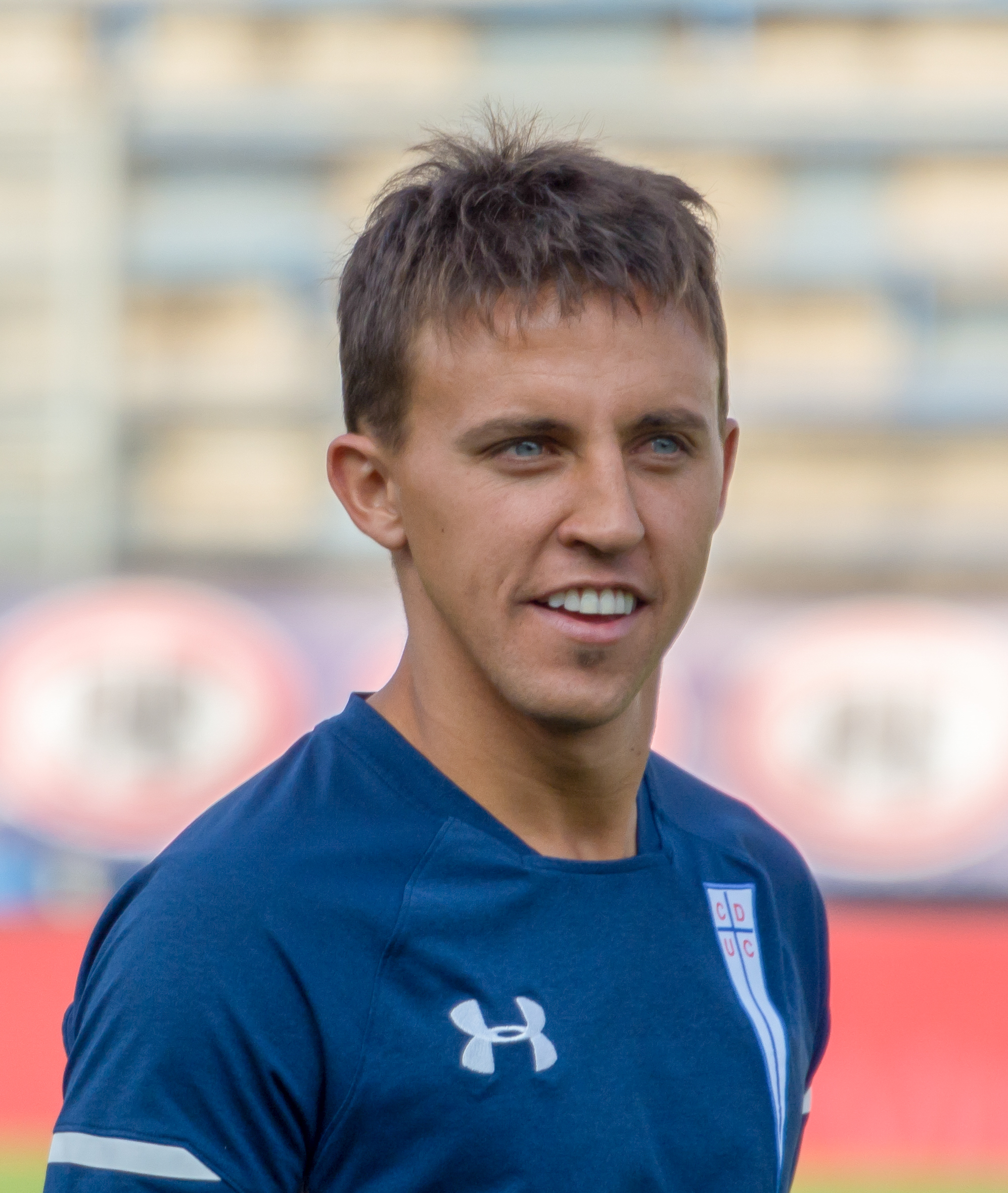
- Buonanotte with Universidad Católica in 2019

Personal information
- Full name: Diego Mario Buonanotte Rende
- Date of birth: 19 April 1988 (age 38)
- Place of birth: Teodelina, Argentina
- Height: 1.60 m (5 ft 3 in)
- Positions: Attacking midfielder; winger

Team information
- Current team: Deportes Temuco
- Number: 18

Youth career
- 2001–2006: River Plate

Senior career*
Years	Team	Apps	(Gls)
2006–2011	River Plate	105	(25)
2011–2013	Málaga	49	(6)
2013–2015	Granada	39	(1)
2014	→ Pachuca (loan)	13	(2)
2015	→ Quilmes (loan)	12	(1)
2015–2016	AEK Athens	27	(6)
2016–2022	Universidad Católica	137	(26)
2022	Sporting Cristal	16	(4)
2023	Unión La Calera	30	(3)
2024	O'Higgins	26	(2)
2025–	Deportes Temuco	29	(10)

International career
2008	Argentina U23	1	(1)
Medal record
Representing Argentina
Men's Football
Olympic Games
Gold medal – first place	2008 Beijing	Team competition
- * Club domestic league appearances and goals as of 30 October 2026

Diego Mario Buonanotte Rende (Spanish pronunciation: [ˈdjeɣo ˈmaɾjo βwonaˈnote ˈrende]; born 19 April 1988) is an Argentine professional footballer who plays for Chilean club Deportes Temuco as an attacking midfielder and winger.

He began his career with River Plate, where he won the Apertura in 2008, and later played in Spain with Málaga and Granada.

Buonanotte was part of the Argentine squad that won the gold medal at the 2008 Olympics.

== Club career ==
=== River Plate ===
Born in Teodelina, Santa Fe, Buonanotte made his professional debut as a 17-year-old on 9 April 2006, in the 3–1 win against Instituto. On 7 October 2007, only one week after his first game, he scored his first goal at senior level. Buonanotte was picked by coach Daniel Passarella to start in the derby against Boca Juniors. River Plate won 2–0, with Buonanotte playing a key role in the victory. He was named by World Soccer magazine as one of the '50 most exciting teenagers in the world game'. Buonanotte was part of the 2008 Apertura winning team.

=== Málaga ===
On 21 January 2011, Buonanotte signed a five-year contract with Málaga CF, but he was loaned to River Plate until July 2011. The reason he left Malaga was not about his appearances with his team but the 1.6 million dollars that River Plate gave for a loan for him. He scored his first goal for Málaga on 21 December 2011 in a 2–2 home draw against Getafe CF in the Copa del Rey (winning 3–2 on aggregate.) On 21 November 2012, he scored his careers first Champions League goal, in a 2−2 away draw against Zenit. Also he scored goals against Barcelona and Real Madrid.

=== Granada ===
On 31 January 2013, Buonanotte signed a 4 1/2-year contract with Granada. After moving to Granada, Buonanotte told Goal.com, he left Malaga in order to get playing time. He was previously linked with a move to Italian side Palermo but opted for Granada.

On 28 August 2014, after being left out of the first-team during the pre-season, Buonanotte was loaned to C.F. Pachuca in a one-year deal.

After playing in their pre-season in Mexico, Buonanotte signed on a six-month loan for Quilmes AC on 30 January 2015.

=== AEK Athens ===
In August 2015, Buonanotte signed a two-year contract with AEK Athens.

On the third matchday of the 2015–16 season he scored twice in a 3–1 home win against PAS Giannina. On 22 November 2015, he scored his fifth league goal helping AEK win against Panthrakios. On 2 December 2015, he scored two goals in his first appearance in the Greek Cup in a 6–0 home win against Panelefsiniakos. On 17 December, he again scored a brace in a 5–0 away win against AEL in the Cup. He finished the year with 11 goals in 35 appearances in all competitions.

=== Universidad Católica ===
On 19 July 2016, Buonanotte signed for Universidad Católica. There, he won the 2016 Apertura, scoring 8 goals in 13 matches. Also winning the 2016 Clausura, and most recently 2018-2019 Chilean Primera Division.

=== Sporting Cristal ===
On 5 July 2022, Buonanotte joined Peruvian side Sporting Cristal until December 2023.

=== Return to Chile ===
In 2023, Buonanotte returned to Chile by signing with Unión La Calera. The next season, he switched to O'Higgins.

In 2025, Buonanotte joined Deportes Temuco in the second level.

== International career ==
Buonanotte was selected by Sergio Batista to be one of the 18 players to represent Argentina in the 2008 Olympics. He only played in the third group-stage game against Serbia, scoring from a long-range free-kick. He won the gold medal with his national team at that tournament.

== Personal life ==
=== Car crash ===
In December 2009, Buonanotte survived a fatal car crash as the sole survivor after he lost control of his car on an Argentine freeway. He was taken to the hospital with multiple injuries while three friends who were travelling with him in the car died at the scene of the crash. The footballer was driving his father's Peugeot 307 back from a night out when he veered off the 65th highway and collided with a tree. The accident occurred about 15 km outside Clementina, Santa Fe. Another car carrying more friends of Buonanotte also arrived on the scene of the accident afterwards eager to find out what had happened. The footballer is said to have been conscious when he was pulled from the wreckage but had sustained serious injuries.

Eduardo Allegrini, director of the hospital, where Buonanotte was taken after the crash, said "(Buonanotte) has fractured his right humerus, right clavicle and has bruised his right lung". Allegrini clarified that the River player's condition was stable but he remained in intensive care under observation. Guillermo Fernández, a firefighter who helped pull Buonanotte from the crash site said: "Diego told us he lost control of the car".

==== Back to the pitch ====
It was initially thought that Buonanotte's convalescence would require up to seven months for complete recovery, but he was able to return to the pitch on 17 April 2010, when he replaced Diego Barrado in the second half of a match against Godoy Cruz. River won 2–1 at home. On 30 April, he scored for the first time since his accident, clinching a 2–1 victory against Vélez Sársfield at the Monumental. Later that year, local prosecutor Carlos Colimedaglia stated that Buonanotte should be charged with three counts of manslaughter. Buonanotte, himself, says he managed to cope with the accident but revealed the opposition fans shout slurs directed at him, like "murderer".

=== Accusation of buying driver's license ===
In 2016, Buonanotte was accused, by The Public Prosecutor's Office of Granada, Spain, along with 94 other people (including footballer Odion Ighalo), of participating in a corruption scheme involving the standard written driving test. The scheme involved manipulating the tests to ensure that those involved passed the written exam.

=== Chilean naturalization ===
In December 2021, he acquired the Chilean nationality by residence along with his colleague Matías Zaldivia, keeping the Argentine nationality.

== Career statistics ==
As of 18 June 2022

Club	Season	League			National cup (Note: Includes Copa del Rey, Copa Argentina, Greek Football Cup, Copa Chile)		Continental		Other		Total	
Club	Season	Division	Apps	Goals	Apps	Goals	Apps	Goals	Apps	Goals	Apps	Goals
River Plate	2006–07	Argentine Primera División	1	0	—		—		—		1	0
River Plate	2007–08	Argentine Primera División	25	11	—		8 (Note: Appearances in Copa Libertadores)	0	—		33	11
River Plate	2008–09	Argentine Primera División	31	3	—		8	1	—		39	4
River Plate	2009–10	Argentine Primera División	23	9	—		—		—		23	9
River Plate	2010–11	Argentine Primera División	26	2	—		—		—		26	2
River Plate	Total		106	25	—		17	1	0	0	122	26
Málaga	2011–12	La Liga	15	0	4	1	—		—		19	1
Málaga	2012–13	La Liga	8	1	5	2	3 (Note: Appearances in UEFA Champions League)	1	—		15	4
Málaga	Total		23	1	9	3	3	1	—		35	5
Granada	2012–13	La Liga	15	1	—		—		—		15	1
Granada	2013–14	La Liga	24	0	1	0	—		—		25	0
Granada	Total		39	1	1	0	—		—		40	1
Pachuca (loan)	2014–15	Liga MX	13	0	—		1 (Note: Appearance in Liga Campeones)	1	—		14	1
Quilmes (loan)	2015	Argentine Primera División	12	1	1	0	—		—		13	1
AEK Atenas	2015–16	Super League Greece	27	6	8	5	—		—		35	11
Universidad Católica	2016–17	Chilean Primera División	27	11	5	1	8 (Note: Six appearances in Copa Libertadores, two appearances in Copa Sudamericana)	1	1 (Note: Appearance in Supercopa de Chile)	0	41	13
Universidad Católica	2017	Chilean Primera División	10	4	4	2	—		1	0	15	6
Universidad Católica	2018	Chilean Primera División	26	7	1	0	—		—		27	7
Universidad Católica	2019	Chilean Primera División	21	2	5	1	4 (Note: Two appearances in Copa Libertadores, two appearances in Copa Sudamericana)	0	1	1	31	4
Universidad Católica	2020	Chilean Primera División	24	0	—		7 (Note: Three appearances in Copa Libertadores, four appearances in Copa Sudamericana)	1	—		31	1
Universidad Católica	2021	Chilean Primera División	19	2	4	1	3	0	1	0	27	3
Universidad Católica	2022	Chilean Primera División	11	0	1	0	4	0	1	0	17	0
Universidad Católica	Total		138	26	20	5	26	2	5	1	189	34
Career total			358	60	39	13	47	5	5	1	449	79

== Honours ==
River Plate

- Primera División de Argentina: 2008-C

AEK

- Greek Cup: 2015–16

Universidad Católica

- Chilean Primera División: 2016 Apertura, 2018, 2019, 2020, 2021
- Supercopa de Chile: 2016, 2019, 2020, 2021

Argentina U23

- Summer Olympics Gold medal: 2008

Individual

- Toulon Tournament Golden Ball: 2009
- Toulon Tournament Golden Boot: 2009
- Chilean Primera División Team of the Year: 2018
