= José Pedro Fuenzalida =

Chilean footballer (born 1985)

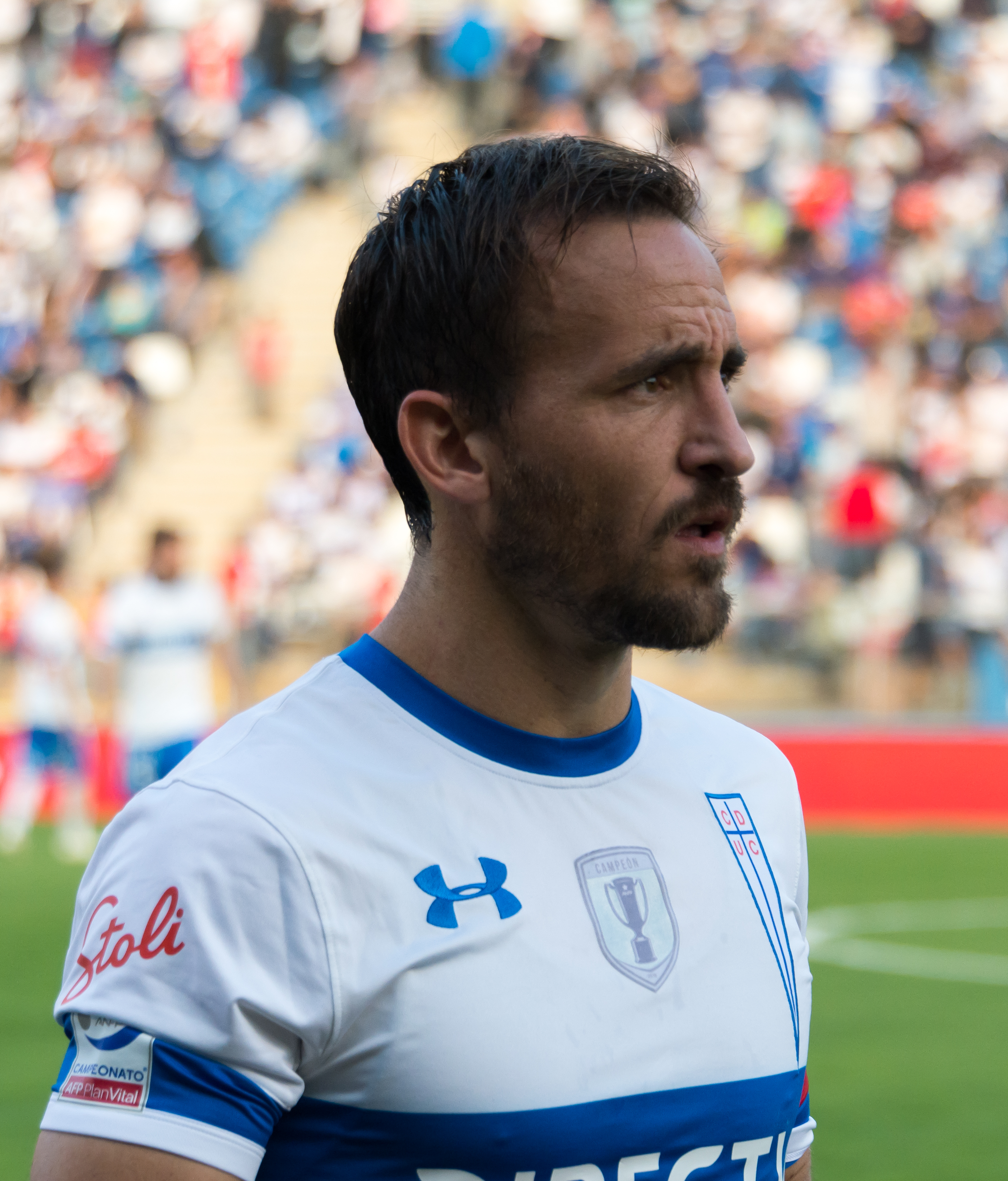
- Fuenzalida with Universidad Católica in 2019

Personal information
- Full name: José Pedro Fuenzalida Gana
- Date of birth: 22 February 1985 (age 41)
- Place of birth: Las Condes, Chile
- Height: 1.70 m (5 ft 7 in)
- Positions: Forward; right winger

Youth career
- 1996–2003: Universidad Católica

Senior career*
Years	Team	Apps	(Gls)
2004–2007	Universidad Católica	96	(9)
2008–2014	Colo-Colo	155	(21)
2008–2009	→ O'Higgins (loan)	51	(14)
2014–2015	Boca Juniors	25	(0)
2016–2022	Universidad Católica	169	(38)
Total		496	(82)

International career
2005	Chile U20	8	(3)
2008	Chile U23	4	(2)
2008–2020	Chile	55	(5)
Medal record
Representing Chile
Copa America
Winner	2015 Chile
Winner	2016 USA
- * Club domestic league appearances and goals

José Pedro Fuenzalida Gana (Latin American Spanish: [xoˈse ˈpeðɾo fwensaˈliða]; born 22 February 1985) is a Chilean former professional footballer who played as a right winger.

== Club career ==
A product of the Universidad Católica youth set-up, Fuenzalida was promoted to the first-adult team in 2004, at the age of 19. He debuted in a 4–0 defeat with Unión Española at San Carlos de Apoquindo for a league game, during a moment considered one of the club's biggest sports crises. Similarly, Fuenzalida collated his football career with his studies in business administration at the University of the Andes, which he abandoned after a short time.

During the winter of 2007, Fuenzalida aged twenty-two decided to take a break as footballer to study commercial engineering at Pontifical Catholic University of Chile.

After six month studying, he returned to professional football and joined rivals Colo-Colo on a four-year deal. Fuenzalida debuted on 13 January 2008 against Universidad de Concepción and scored his first goal in a 2–1 home win over Deportes Antofagasta. In June, he joined O'Higgins on loan after an unsuccessful tournament where only scored one goal in seven games.

In December 2009, it was reported that Fuenzalida finished his loan spell at O'Higgins and would return to Colo-Colo to face the next season. Seasons later, he helped the team to win the 2014 Torneo Apertura, being a key player in the title obtention which was his first honour playing for the club.

On 29 July 2014, Fuenzalida reached a one-and-half year with Argentine powerhouse Boca Juniors.

Following an unsuccessful spell at Boca, he returned to Universidad Católica in 2016, signing for Las Condes-based club as a free agent. He helped the team to win Torneo Clausura.

Fuenzalida left Universidad Católica at the end of the 2022 season, not confirming his retirement. However, in April 2023, his wife confirmed he had retired from football.

== International career ==
Fuenzalida has played in the U-20 and U-23 levels of the Chile national team in the 2005 FIFA U-20 World Cup and the 2008 Toulon Tournament, respectively.

Usually called up by Marcelo Bielsa for the 2010 World Cup qualification, he was chosen by Jorge Sampaoli in Chile's list of 23 for 2014 FIFA World Cup. In 2015, after being disaffected of the 30-man provisional list for the Copa América, he was re-considered by Sampaoli in the definitive list following the withdrawal of the injured Carlos Carmona.

== Personal life ==
Following his retirement, Fuenzalida and his family emigrated to Los Angeles, California, and he began to study English.

== Career statistics ==
=== Club ===
As of 30 June 2022

Appearances and goals by club, season and competition
Club	Season	League			National cup		Continental		Other		Total	
Club	Season	Division	Apps	Goals	Apps	Goals	Apps	Goals	Apps	Goals	Apps	Goals
Universidad Católica	2004	Chilean Primera División	26	4	2	0	—		—		28	4
Universidad Católica	2005	Chilean Primera División	26	0	—		10 (Note: Appearance(s) in the Copa Sudamericana)	0	—		36	0
Universidad Católica	2006	Chilean Primera División	32	4	—		6 (Note: Appearance(s) in the Copa Libertadores)	1	—		38	5
Universidad Católica	2007	Chilean Primera División	12	1	—		—		—		12	1
Universidad Católica	Total		96	9	2	0	16	1	0	0	114	10
Colo-Colo	2008	Chilean Primera División	7	1	—		—		—		7	1
Colo-Colo	2010	Chilean Primera División	31	3	1	0	7 (Note: Five appearances in the Copa Libertadores, two in the Copa Sudamericana)	1	—		39	4
Colo-Colo	2011	Chilean Primera División	26	5	6	2	4	0	—		36	7
Colo-Colo	2012	Chilean Primera División	39	4	8	3	—		—		47	7
Colo-Colo	2013	Chilean Primera División	17	4	—		—		—		17	4
Colo-Colo	2013–14	Chilean Primera División	33	4	7	1	4	0	—		44	5
Colo-Colo	2014–15	Chilean Primera División	2	0	—		—		—		2	0
Colo-Colo	Total		155	21	22	6	15	1	0	0	192	28
O'Higgins (loan)	2008	Chilean Primera División	20	6	1	0	—		—		21	6
O'Higgins (loan)	2009	Chilean Primera División	31	8	—		—		—		31	8
O'Higgins (loan)	Total		51	14	1	0	0	0	0	0	52	14
Boca Juniors	2014	Argentine Primera División	12	0	—		6	1	—		18	1
Boca Juniors	2015	Argentine Primera División	13	0	2	0	3	0	—		18	0
Boca Juniors	Total		25	0	2	0	9	1	0	0	36	1
Universidad Católica	2015–16	Chilean Primera División	13	4	—		—		—		13	4
Universidad Católica	2016–17	Chilean Primera División	22	4	4	2	6 (Note: Five appearances in the Copa Libertadores, one in the Copa Sudamericana)	0	1 (Note: Appearance(s) in the Supercopa de Chile)	1	33	7
Universidad Católica	2017	Chilean Primera División	13	4	3	0	—		1	0	17	4
Universidad Católica	2018	Chilean Primera División	29	5	2	0	—		—		31	5
Universidad Católica	2019	Chilean Primera División	21	10	3	0	8 (Note: Six appearances in the Copa Libertadores, two in the Copa Sudamericana)	0	1	0	33	10
Universidad Católica	2020	Chilean Primera División	22	4	—		11 (Note: Five appearances in the Copa Libertadores, six in the Copa Sudamericana)	0	1	0	34	4
Universidad Católica	2021	Chilean Primera División	24	3	4	0	6	0	—		34	3
Universidad Católica	2022	Chilean Primera División	11	0	2	1	6 (Note: Five appearances in Copa Libertadores, one in Copa Sudamericana)	0	1	0	20	0
Universidad Católica	Total		155	34	18	3	37	0	5	1	215	37
Career total			482	77	45	9	77	3	5	1	609	90

=== International ===
Appearances and goals by national team and year
National team	Year	Apps	Goals
Chile	2008	4	0
Chile	2009	4	0
Chile	2010	5	0
Chile	2012	1	0
Chile	2013	5	1
Chile	2014	4	0
Chile	2015	1	0
Chile	2016	12	2
Chile	2017	10	0
Chile	2019	5	2
Chile	2020	2	0
Total		55	5

Scores and results list Chile's goal tally first, score column indicates score after each Fuenzalida goal.

List of international goals scored by José Pedro Fuenzalida
No.	Date	Venue	Opponent	Score	Result	Competition
1	19 January 2013	Estadio Municipal de Concepción, Concepción, Chile	Haiti	3–0	3–0	Friendly
2	6 June 2016	Levi's Stadium, Santa Clara, United States	Argentina	1–2	1–2	Copa América Centenario
3	22 June 2016	Soldier Field, Chicago, United States	Colombia	2–0	2–0	Copa América Centenario
4	6 June 2019	Estadio La Portada, La Serena, Chile	Haiti	2–1	2–1	Friendly
5	21 June 2019	Itaipava Arena Fonte Nova, Salvador, Brazil	Ecuador	1–0	2–1	2019 Copa América

== Honours ==
Universidad Católica

- Chilean Primera División (7): 2005–C, 2016–C, 2016–A, 2018, 2019, 2020, 2021
- Supercopa de Chile: 2016, 2019, 2020, 2021

Colo-Colo

- Chilean Primera División: 2014–C

Boca Juniors

- Primera División de Argentina: 2015
- Copa Argentina: 2014–15

Chile

- Copa América: 2015, 2016

Individual

- Chilean Primera División's El Gráfico Golden Ball: 2013
- SIFUP Best Right Back: 2013
