= David Henríquez =

David Henríquez may refer to:

- David Henríquez (footballer, born 1977)
- David Henríquez (footballer, born 1998)
