= Fabián Manzano =

Chilean footballer (born 1994)

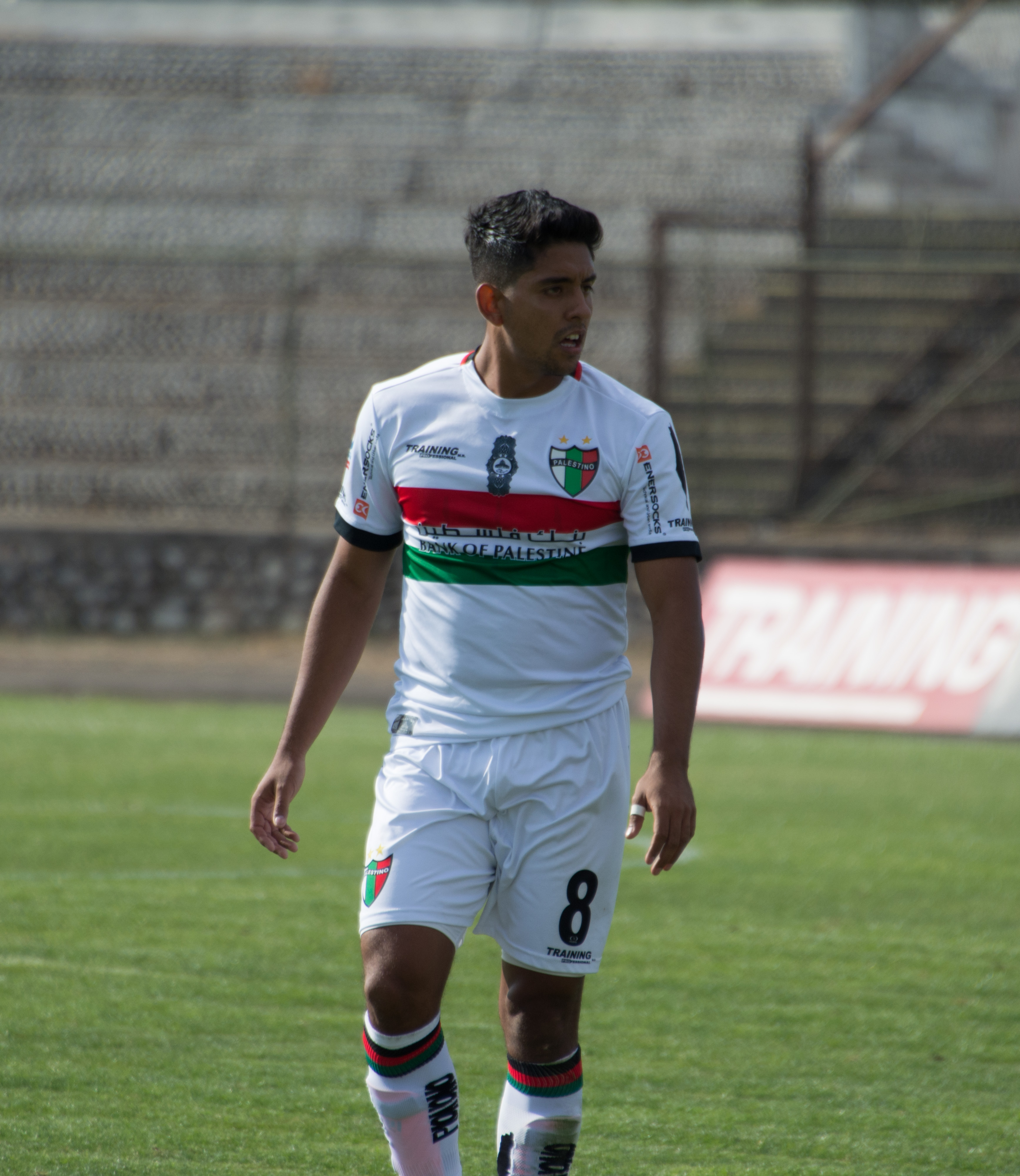
- Manzano with Palestino in 2018

Personal information
- Full name: Fabián Jorge Manzano Pérez
- Date of birth: 13 January 1994 (age 32)
- Place of birth: Santiago, Chile
- Height: 1.74 m (5 ft 8 1/2 in)
- Position: Midfielder

Team information
- Current team: Deportes Antofagasta

Youth career
- Universidad Católica

Senior career*
Years	Team	Apps	(Gls)
2013–2018	Universidad Católica	44	(2)
2018	→ Palestino (loan)	5	(0)
2019	Unión La Calera	2	(0)
2020	Racing Montevideo	8	(0)
2021	Deportes Copiapó	23	(0)
2022–2023	Deportes Puerto Montt	57	(1)
2024	Deportes Copiapó	16	(0)
2025–	Deportes Antofagasta	0	(0)
- * Club domestic league appearances and goals as of 9 January 2025

Fabián Jorge Manzano Pérez (born 13 January 1994), is a Chilean footballer who plays for Deportes Antofagasta as a midfielder.

== Club career ==
Manzano ended his contract with Deportes Puerto Montt in December 2023 after the club was relegated to the Chilean third level. The next season, he joined Deportes Copiapó in the top level. In 2025, he signed with Deportes Antofagasta.

== Honours ==
Universidad Católica

- Primera División de Chile (2): 2016 Clausura, 2016 Apertura
- Supercopa de Chile (1): 2016

Palestino

- Copa Chile (1): 2018
