= Stefano Magnasco =

Chilean footballer (born 1992)

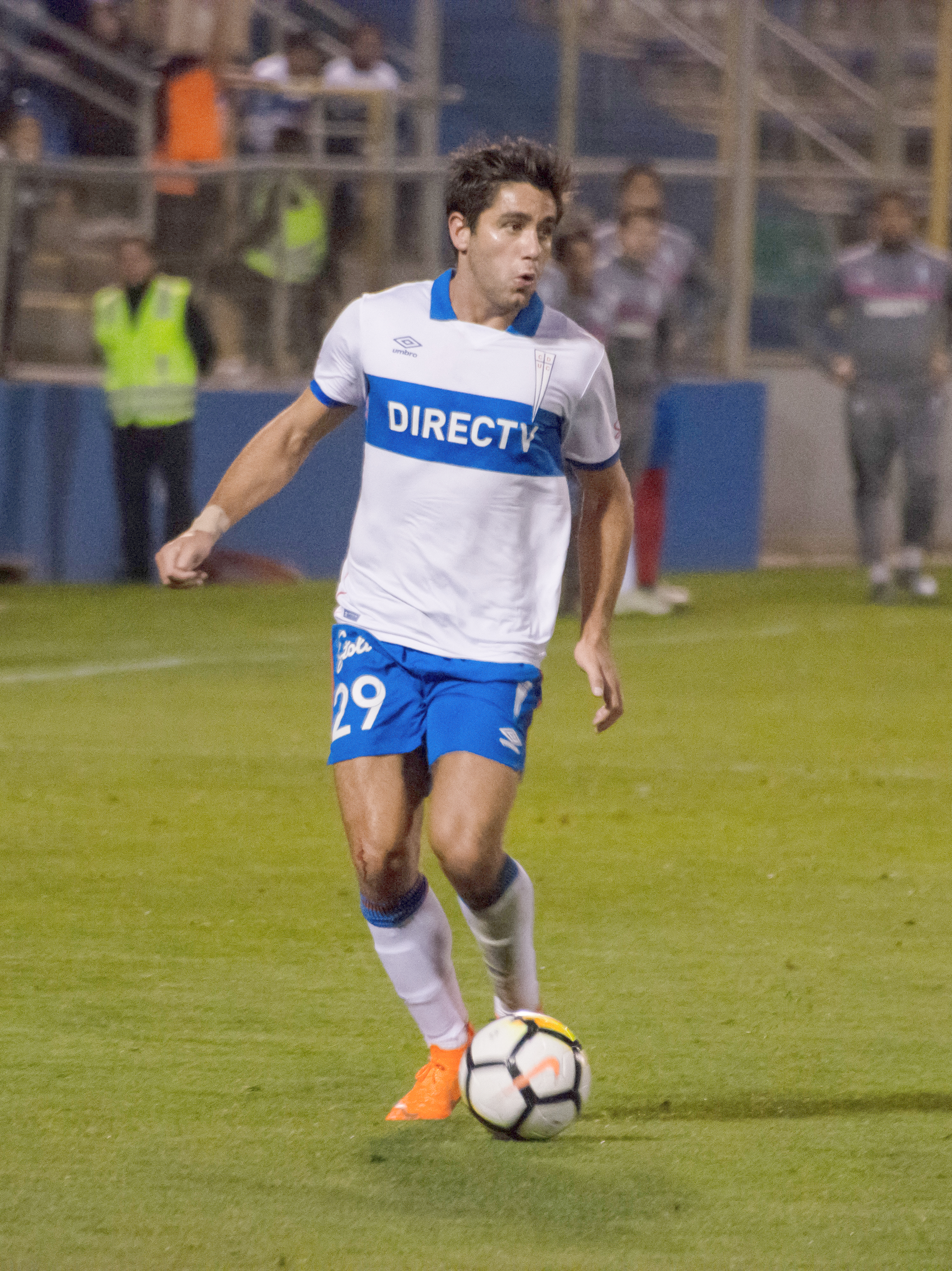
- Magnasco with Universidad Católica in 2018

Personal information
- Full name: Stefano Magnasco Galindo
- Date of birth: 28 September 1992 (age 34)
- Place of birth: Santiago, Chile
- Height: 1.75 m (5 ft 9 in)
- Position: Right-back

Youth career
- 2002–2010: Universidad Católica

Senior career*
Years	Team	Apps	(Gls)
2011–2012	Universidad Católica	39	(0)
2012–2014	Groningen	29	(0)
2014–2020	Universidad Católica	106	(1)
2020	Deportes La Serena	14	(0)
2021–2024	Unión Española	73	(3)
2025	Deportes Temuco	19	(0)
- * Club domestic league appearances and goals as of 26 January 2026

Stefano Magnasco Galindo (Spanish: [esteˈfano maˈɲasko], Italian: [ˈsteːfano maɲˈɲasko]; born 28 September 1992) is a Chilean footballer who plays as a right-back.

== Career ==
Product of Universidad Católica youth ranks, he debuted in May 2011, thanks to Juan Antonio Pizzi, coach of Católica in that moment. In September of that year, Magnasco was on trial at Premier League club Bolton Wanderers, failing to sign here and then not joining Chelsea, that also attempted to sign him. However, in mid–2012, he joined Groningen, of this form leaving his country with a Copa Chile honour.

In 2025, Magnasco signed with Deportes Temuco from Unión Española.

== Honours ==
Universidad Católica

- Primera División de Chile (5): 2016–A, 2016–C, 2018, 2019, 2020
- Copa Chile (1): 2011
- Supercopa de Chile (2): 2016, 2019
