= David Henríquez (footballer, born 1998) =

Chilean footballer

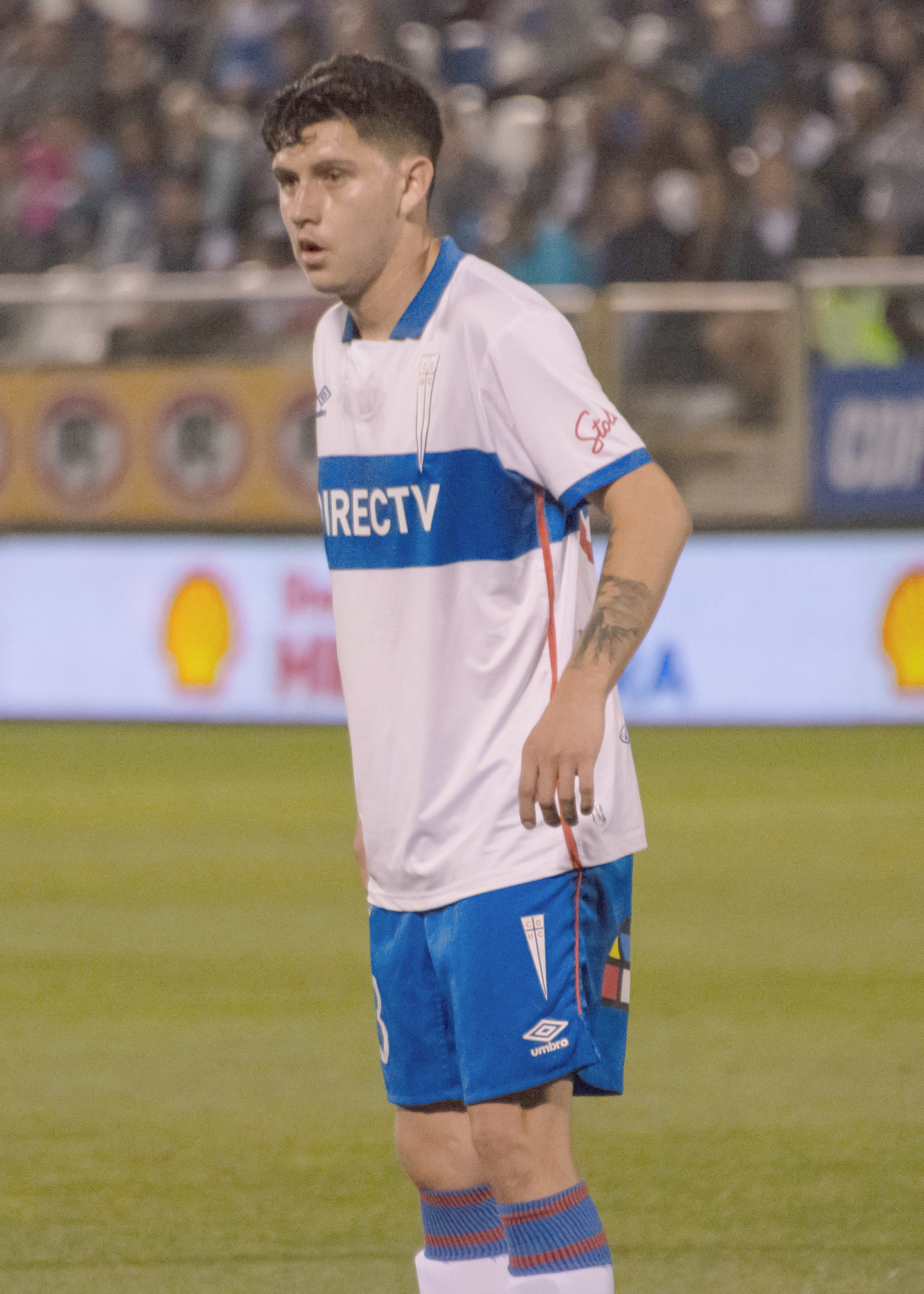

Personal information
- Full name: David Alejandro Henríquez Mandiola
- Date of birth: 21 February 1999 (age 27)
- Place of birth: Antofagasta, Chile
- Height: 1.75 m (5 ft 9 in)
- Position: Forward

Team information
- Current team: Deportes Concepción
- Number: 15

Youth career
- 2014–: Universidad Católica

Senior career*
Years	Team	Apps	(Gls)
2017–2021	Universidad Católica	18	(2)
2020	→ Barnechea (loan)	19	(2)
2021	→ Santa Cruz (loan)	1	(1)
2022–	Deportes Concepción	0	(0)
- * Club domestic league appearances and goals as of 16 May 2021

David Alejandro Henríquez Mandiola (born 21 February 1998) is a Chilean professional footballer who plays as a forward for Chilean club Deportes Concepción.

== Honours ==
=== Club ===
Universidad Católica

- Primera División de Chile (2): 2018, 2019
- Supercopa de Chile (1): 2019
