= Nicolás Castillo =

Chilean footballer (born 1993)

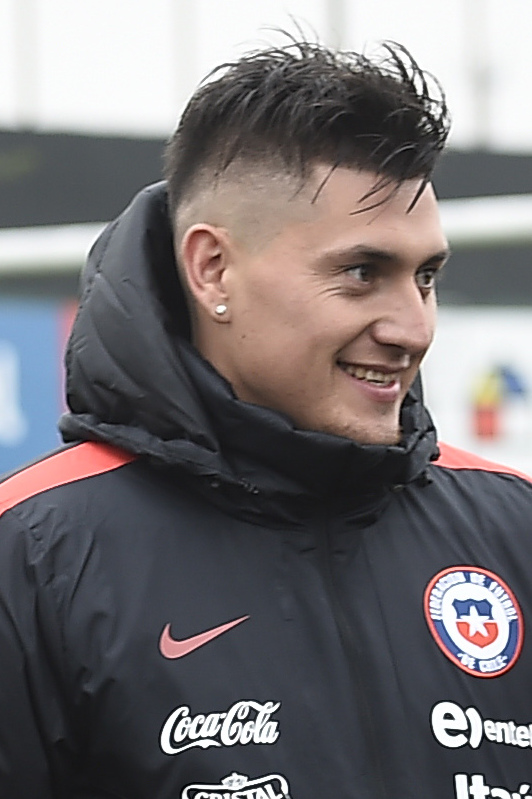
- Castillo with Chile in 2016

Personal information
- Full name: Nicolás Ignacio Castillo Mora
- Date of birth: 14 February 1993 (age 33)
- Place of birth: Santiago, Chile
- Height: 1.79 m (5 ft 10 in)
- Position: Striker

Youth career
- 2005–2011: Universidad Católica

Senior career*
Years	Team	Apps	(Gls)
2011–2014	Universidad Católica	52	(17)
2014–2016	Club Brugge	30	(10)
2015	→ Mainz 05 (loan)	1	(0)
2015	→ Frosinone (loan)	6	(0)
2016	→ Universidad Católica (loan)	23	(24)
2017–2018	UNAM	39	(25)
2018–2019	Benfica	4	(0)
2019–2021	América	24	(9)
2021	→ Juventude (loan)	2	(0)
2022	Necaxa	2	(0)
2024	Universidad Católica	12	(2)
2025	Santiago City	3	(1)
2025	City Soccer	4	(1)
2026	City Soccer (football 7)	3	(0)
Total		205	(89)

International career
2013	Chile U20	11	(9)
2013–2019	Chile	24	(4)
Medal record
Representing Chile
Winner	Copa América Centenario	2016
- * Club domestic league appearances and goals

Nicolás Ignacio Castillo Mora (born 14 February 1993) is a Chilean former professional footballer who played as a striker.

== Club career ==
=== Universidad Católica ===
Castillo was born and raised in Renca, suburb of the capital Santiago. During his childhood, he was part of Universidad Católica's supporter groups and later joined the club's youth ranks when he was 12.

In 2010, Castillo made a goalscorer debut against San Pedro de Atacama football team for a cup game, sealing a 10–0 thrash of Católica after scoring the tenth and last goal of it.

In 2011, Castillo debuted professionally in a league match against Cobreloa, coming on as an 84th-minute substitute during a 2–0 win. On 2 March 2012, he scored his first competitive goal in a 2–0 win over Rangers, again for a league match.

As a result of his performance in the 2013 FIFA U-20 World Cup, Castillo was linked with Premier League side Manchester United, where his compatriot Ángelo Henríquez was playing at the time. Despite the rumours surrounding his move, the transfer never materialised.

=== Club Brugge ===
In January 2014, Universidad Católica reached an agreement to sell Castillo to Belgian Pro League side Club Brugge. The move became official as Castillo signed for a fee of €3 million on a deal until 2018. He scored in his debut for Club Brugge in a 3–1 win over Genk on 9 February 2014. He struggled to score again but did so during the play-offs in the last game of the season against Zulte Waregem, with Brugge winning 2–0.

On 9 November 2014, Castillo netted a hat-trick in Brugge's 5–0 home win over Westerlo. On 28 January 2015, he was loaned to 1. FSV Mainz 05 until the end of the season, with an option to buy. On 7 April, having only made one substitute appearance for the Bundesliga club, he was ruled out for the remainder of the season with damage to his right knee ligaments.

Later, on 28 August 2015, Castillo joined Italian side Frosinone on loan from Club Brugge until the end of the season.

=== Pumas ===
In 2017, Castillo joined Mexican club Pumas UNAM, where he played for a year.

=== Benfica ===
On 4 June 2018, he was sold to Portuguese side Benfica, signing a five-year contract.

=== América ===
On 1 February 2019, Castillo returned to Mexico, joining Club América on a €7 million transfer fee, potentially rising to €9 million. Nine days later, he made his league debut as a second-half substitute in América's 3–0 loss to León at the Estadio Azteca.

=== Juventude ===
On 26 August 2021, Castillo joined Brazilian side Juventude on loan from América until the end of the season.

=== Santiago City ===
After leaving Universidad Católica in 2024, Castillo signed with Santiago City in the Chilean Segunda La Liga 2D in March 2025.

=== City Soccer FC ===
On 29 October 2025, Castillo signed with City Soccer FC in the UPSL.

== International career ==
Castillo was listed in the 21-man squad for the 2013 FIFA U-20 World Cup. In the tournament, he scored four goals, including an opener against Egypt, and was the top-scorer for Chile.

Castillo made his debut for the Chile senior team on 23 March 2013 in a 1–0 2014 FIFA World Cup qualification (CONMEBOL) away loss to Peru, coming on as a 70th-minute substitute for Jean Beausejour.

In 2016, Castillo was nominated for the 2016 Copa América squad and was part of the Chilean victory in the tournament. He was subbed in the 104th minute of the final against Argentina, which Chile won 4–2 on penalties, where he converted the 2nd spot kick.

== Post-retirement ==
=== Football 7 ===
Once Castillo retired from professional football in February 2026, he joined the City Soccer FC football 7 team with views to the 2026 TST Tournament.

=== Golf ===
In September 2026, Castillo joined the Atlas Open, a professional golf tournament at the Gira Profesional Mexicana. In the same year, he also competed at the Chile Open.

== Career statistics ==
=== Club ===
As of 9 November 2019

Club statistics
Club	Season	League			Cup		Continental		Total	
Club	Season	Division	Apps	Goals	Apps	Goals	Apps	Goals	Apps	Goals
Universidad Católica	2011	Primera División of Chile	3	0	5	2	—		8	2
Universidad Católica	2012	Primera División of Chile	21	8	3	2	8	2	32	12
Universidad Católica	2013	Primera División of Chile	11	3	4	2	6	3	21	8
Universidad Católica	2013–14	Primera División of Chile	17	6	0	0	—		17	6
Universidad Católica	Total		52	17	12	6	14	5	78	28
Club Brugge	2013–14	Belgian Pro League	12	2	0	0	—		12	2
Club Brugge	2014–15	Belgian Pro League	18	8	3	1	6	2	27	11
Club Brugge	Total		30	10	3	1	6	2	39	13
Mainz 05 (loan)	2014–15	Bundesliga	1	0	0	0	—		1	0
Frosinone (loan)	2015–16	Serie A	6	0	0	0	—		6	0
Universidad Católica (loan)	2015–16	Primera División of Chile	11	11	0	0	—		11	11
Universidad Católica (loan)	2016–17	Primera División of Chile	12	13	7	5	1	0	20	18
Universidad Católica (loan)	Total		23	24	7	5	1	0	31	29
Pumas UNAM	2016–17	Liga MX	11	8	0	0	2	0	13	8
Pumas UNAM	2017–18	Liga MX	28	17	4	1	—		32	18
Pumas UNAM	Total		39	25	4	1	2	0	45	26
Benfica	2018–19	Primeira Liga	4	0	4	0	3	0	11	0
Club América	2018–19	Liga MX	14	5	1	0	—		15	5
Club América	2019–20	Liga MX	7	4	1 (Note: Includes 1 match in the 2019 Campeón de Campeones)	0	0	0	8	4
Club América	Total		21	9	2	0	0	0	23	9
Career totals			176	85	32	13	26	7	234	105

=== International ===
As of match played 6 July 2019

National team	Year	Apps	Goals
Chile	2013	1	0
Chile	2014	0	0
Chile	2015	0	0
Chile	2016	7	1
Chile	2017	2	0
Chile	2018	8	2
Chile	2019	6	1
Total		24	4

=== International goals ===
Scores and results list Chile's goal tally first.

No.	Date	Venue	Opponent	Score	Result	Competition
1.	27 May 2016	Estadio Sausalito, Viña del Mar, Chile	Jamaica	1–2	1–2	Friendly
2.	16 October 2018	Estadio Corregidora, Querétaro City, Mexico	Mexico	1–0	1–0	Friendly
3.	20 November 2018	Estadio Municipal Germán Becker, Temuco, Chile	Honduras	4–1	4–1	Friendly
4.	22 March 2019	SDCCU Stadium, San Diego, United States	Mexico	1–3	1–3	Friendly

== Honours ==
Universidad Católica

- Primera División de Chile: Torneo Clausura 2015–16, Torneo Apertura 2016–17
- Copa Chile: 2011
- Supercopa de Chile: 2016

Club Brugge

- Belgian Cup: 2014–15

Benfica

- Primeira Liga: 2018–19

América

- Copa MX: Clausura 2019
- Campeón de Campeones: 2019

Chile

- Copa América: 2016
