= Teodelina =

Coordinates: 34°11′23″S 61°31′35″W

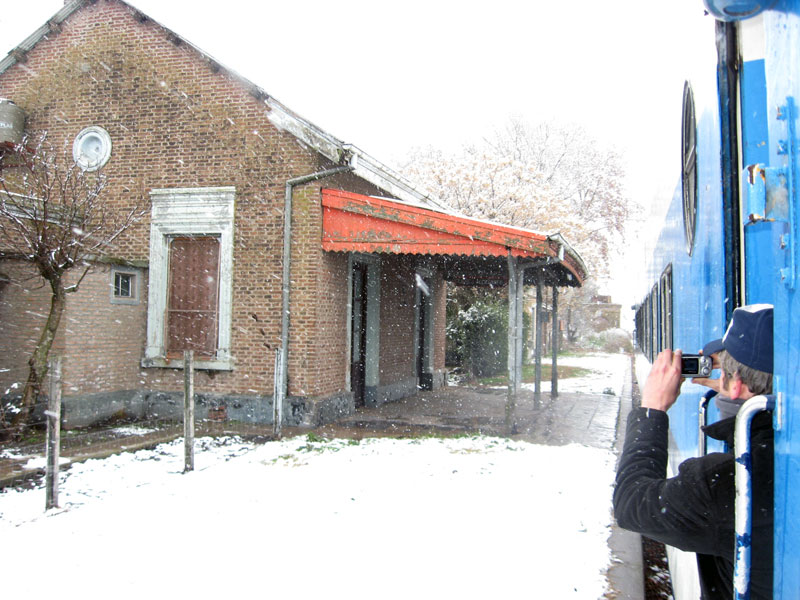
- Interactive map of Teodelina
- Country: Argentina
- Province: Santa Fe
- Department: General López
- Established: December 19, 1894
- Founder: José Roberti

Government
  - Communal President: Alejandro Luis Permingeat

Area
  - Total: 713 km^{2} (275 sq mi)

Population
  - Total: 6,095
  - Density: 8.55/km^{2} (22.1/sq mi)
- Demonym: Teodelinense
- Time zone: UTC−3 (ART)
- Postal code: S6009

Teodelina is a place situated in the General López Department of the Santa Fe Province, Argentina. It is located 376 km from the Santa Fe city, and 205 km from Rosario. It was established on December 19, 1894.
