= Sebastián Sáez =

Argentine footballer

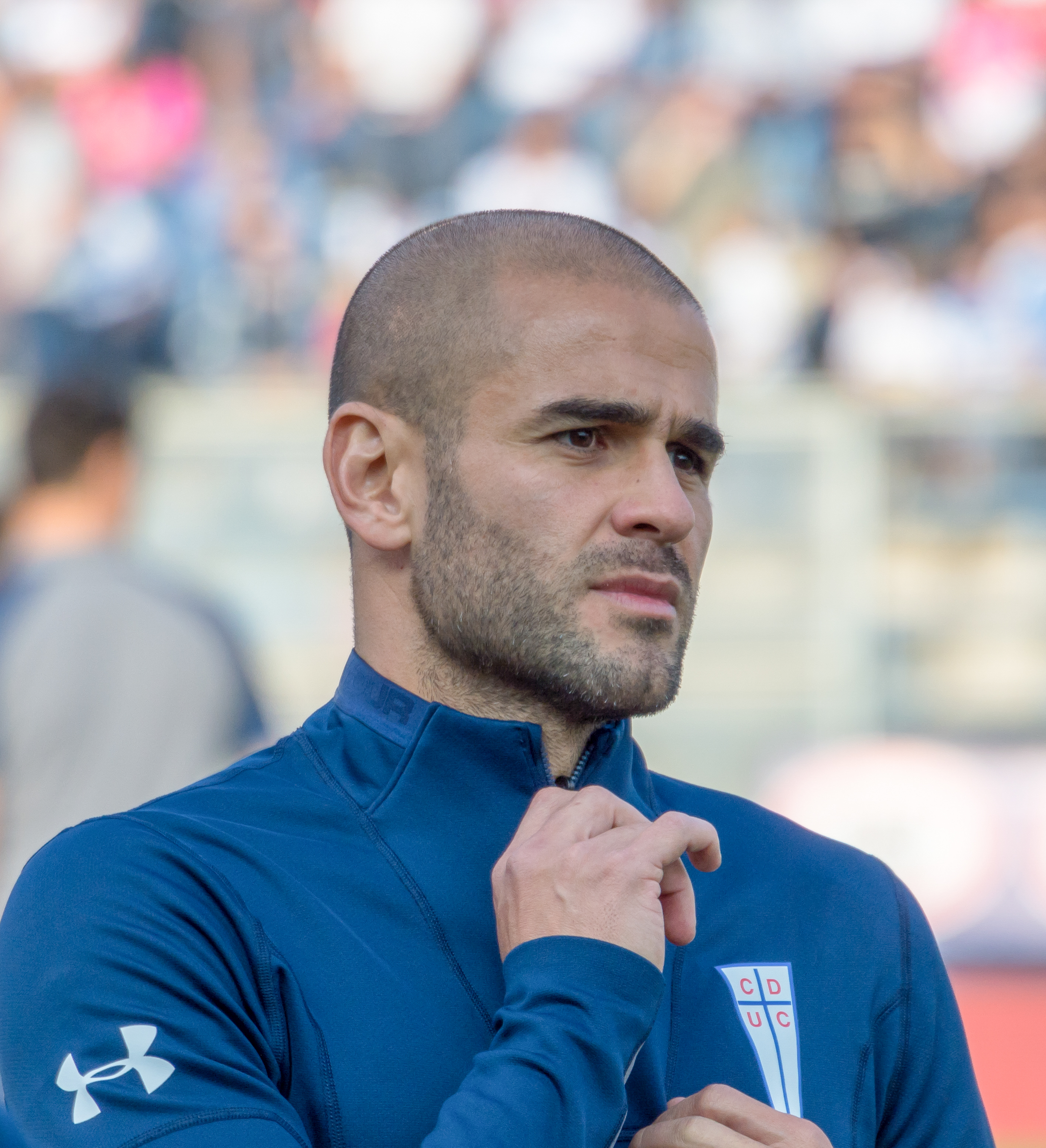
- Sáez with Universidad Católica in 2019.

Personal information
- Full name: Jorge Sebastián Sáez
- Date of birth: 24 January 1985 (age 41)
- Place of birth: Santiago del Estero, Argentina
- Height: 1.76 m (5 ft 9 in)
- Position: Striker

Team information
- Current team: Unión La Calera
- Number: 9

Youth career
- Tiro Federal

Senior career*
Years	Team	Apps	(Gls)
2006–2007	Tiro Federal	18	(1)
2007–2011	Central Córdoba SdE	121	(52)
2011–2012	Talleres	39	(19)
2012–2013	Audax Italiano	35	(27)
2012	Audax Italiano B	1	(1)
2013–2016	Al-Wakrah	77	(45)
2016–2018	Emirates	47	(24)
2018–2019	Universidad Católica	30	(9)
2020–2022	Unión La Calera	52	(19)
2023	Everton	28	(12)
2024	Huachipato	20	(1)
2025–	Unión La Calera	0	(0)
- * Club domestic league appearances and goals as of 12 January 2025

Jorge Sebastián Sáez (Spanish pronunciation: [seβasˈtjan ˈsaeθ] born 24 January 1985), known as Sebastián Sáez, is an Argentine naturalized Chilean footballer who plays as a striker for Chilean club Unión La Calera.

== Career ==
In 2016, he signed with Emirates Club.

For the 2024 season, Sáez signed with Huachipato, then the Chilean champion. In 2025, he returned to Unión La Calera after his stint with them in 2020–2022.

== Personal life ==
Sáez got Chilean nationality by residence at the beginning of 2025.

== Honours ==
Universidad Católica

- Primera División de Chile (2): 2018, 2019
- Supercopa de Chile (1): 2019

Individual

- Primera División de Chile Top-scorer (2): 2012 Clausura, 2013 Transición
