= Vicente Starikoff =

Chilean footballer (born 1995)

Personal information
- Full name: Vicente Starikoff Ibarra
- Date of birth: 23 October 1995 (age 31)
- Place of birth: Providencia, Chile
- Height: 1.81 m (5 ft 11 in)
- Position: Centre-back

Youth career
- 2006–2016: Universidad Católica

Senior career*
| Years | Team | Apps | (Gls) |
| 2016–2017 | Universidad Católica | 0 | (0) |
| 2016–2017 | → Rangers (loan) | 1 | (0) |
| 2017 | → Deportes Copiapó (loan) | 0 | (0) |
| 2018–2021 | Deportes Recoleta | 30 | (1) |
| 2021–2023 | Deportes Colina | 10 | (0) |
- * Club domestic league appearances and goals

Vicente Starikoff Ibarra (born 23 October 1995) is a Chilean former footballer who played as a centre-back.

== Career ==
Vicente did all lower in Universidad Católica but his debut was in Rangers de Talca.

In 2023, Starikoff joined Deportes Colina in the Segunda División Profesional de Chile. He left them in January 2023.

== Post-retirenment ==
Starikoff graduated as a psychologist at Universidad Mayor and has worked in sport psychology.
