= Germán Voboril =

Argentine footballer

Personal information
- Full name: Germán Ariel Voboril
- Date of birth: May 5, 1987 (age 39)
- Place of birth: Lanús, Argentina
- Height: 1.77 m (5 ft 10 in)
- Position: Left-back

Team information
- Current team: Mitre

Youth career
- San Lorenzo

Senior career*
Years	Team	Apps	(Gls)
2006–2014	San Lorenzo	36	(0)
2011–2012	→ Godoy Cruz (loan)	20	(0)
2014–2017	Racing	26	(0)
2016–2017	→ Newell's Old Boys (loan)	8	(0)
2017–2018	Universidad Católica	23	(0)
2019	Universidad de Concepción	14	(1)
2020	San Martín Tucumán	0	(0)
2020–	Mitre	30	(1)

International career
2007	Argentina U20	1	(0)
- * Club domestic league appearances and goals as of 15:51, 31 July 2022 (UTC)

Germán Ariel Voboril (born 5 May 1987) is an Argentine professional footballer who plays as a left-back for Mitre. His father, Osvaldo, was also a footballer.

== Career ==
=== San Lorenzo ===
Emerged from the bottom of San Lorenzo de Almagro, debuted in the first of this club September 2 of 2006 against Club Banfield meeting would end in favor of San Lorenzo 2–1. During that season dispute to a total of 15 matches. It would be a participant in the Clausura 2007 championship won with a total of 45 points. Due to injuries and low yields, Voboril, would hardly taken into account by the different technical club so the January 6 of 2011 is given for one year and purchase option Godoy Cruz.

=== Loan Godoy Cruz ===
In Godoy Cruz would not be many parties that would contest (mainly through injury) but to have good performances reach and leave the club in Mendoza third location in the Clausura 2011. In addition to play 3 matches in the Copa Libertadores 2011 and 2 in the American Cup 2011.

=== Return to San Lorenzo ===
In January 2012, and after his departure unlock club Mendoza, returns to San Lorenzo de Almagro by order of then coach

In his second spell at the club of Boedo, began being to title but suffered a torn cruciate ligament and meniscus in his left knee on the end of the match that his team drew 1–1 with Banfield the April 22 of 2012. This injury caused him to miss the courts for more than year and a half, so just go back to playing tennis seamlessly with April 2014.

=== Racing Club ===
The August 11 of 2014, after his contract with San Lorenzo, signed a contract for 18 months with Racing Club of Avellaneda. He played his first game against Boca, entering replacement Diego Milito. His first match was against headline Gimnasia y Esgrima de La Plata, ending the match in victory by 1 to 0. The December 14 of that year he won his third national title, having played four of the 19 matches of the tournament (coming off the bench in 2 of them and being started against Rosario Central, prior to obtaining the championship match, showing a high level).

Currently in 2015 he played 23 games and still not become goals.

== International career ==
Voboril was on the Argentina under-20 team that won the 2007 FIFA U-20 World Cup tournament held in Canada.

== Honours ==
San Lorenzo

- Argentine Primera División (2): 2007 Clausura, 2013 Inicial
- Copa Libertadores (1): 2014

Racing Club

- Argentine Primera División (1): 2014 Torneo de Transición

Universidad Católica

- Primera División de Chile (1): 2018

Argentina U-20

- FIFA U-20 World Cup (1): 2007
