= 2019 Supercopa de Chile =

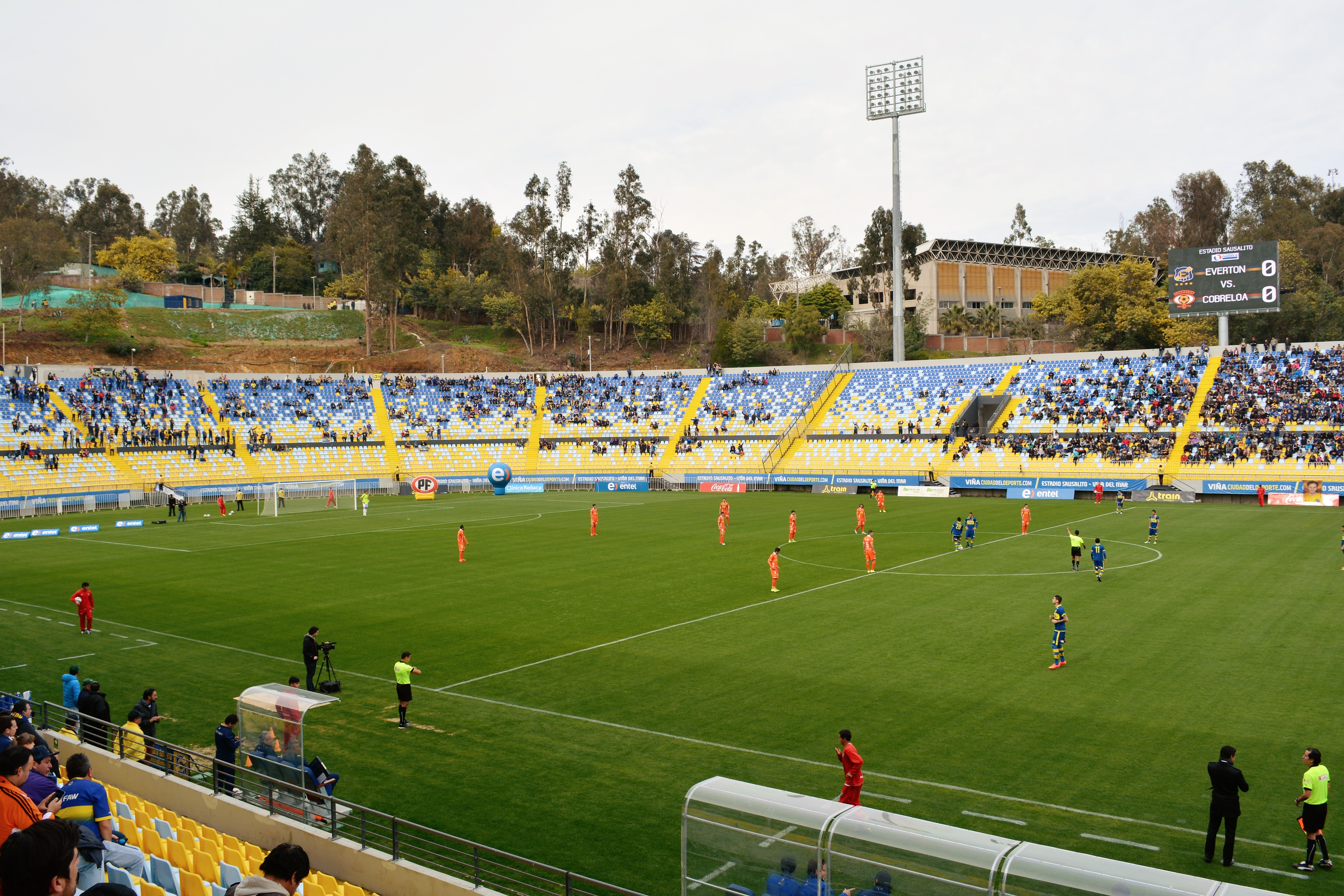
- Estadio Sausalito in Viña del Mar hosted the match
- Event: Súper Copa Easy 2019
Universidad Católica	Palestino
5	0
- Date: 23 March 2019
- Venue: Estadio Sausalito, Viña del Mar
- Referee: Roberto Tobar
- Attendance: 14,914

The 2019 Supercopa de Chile (known as the Súper Copa Easy 2019 for sponsorship purposes) was the seventh edition of the Supercopa de Chile, championship organised by the Asociación Nacional de Fútbol Profesional (ANFP). The match was played by the 2018 Chilean Primera División champions Universidad Católica and the 2018 Copa Chile winners Palestino on 23 March 2019 at Estadio Sausalito in Viña del Mar.

Universidad Católica were the winners, beating Palestino by a 5–0 score.

== Teams ==
The two teams that contested the Supercopa were Universidad Católica, who qualified as 2018 Primera División champions and Palestino, who qualified for the match as the 2018 Copa Chile winners, defeating Audax Italiano in the two-legged final by a 4–2 aggregate score.

Universidad Católica	Palestino
2018 Primera División champions	2018 Copa Chile winners

== Details ==
23 March 2019
18:00

Universidad Católica	5–0	Palestino
Kuscevic 39'; Pinares 43'; Sáez 58'; Valencia 89'; Buonanotte 90+1'	Report

Estadio Sausalito, Viña del Mar
Attendance: 14,914
Referee: Roberto Tobar

Universidad Catolica	Palestino

GK	1	(Argentina) Matías Dituro
RB	29	(Chile) Stefano Magnasco
CB	13	(Chile) Benjamín Kuscevic
CB	5	(Chile) Valber Huerta	(substituted off) 81'
LB	23	(Chile) Juan Cornejo
LCM	6	(Chile) César Fuentes
RCM	11	(Argentina) Luciano Aued
AM	14	(Chile) César Pinares	(yellow card) 74'
RW	19	(Chile) José Pedro Fuenzalida (c)
LW	9	(Chile) Edson Puch	(substituted off) 81'
CF	7	(Argentina) Sebastián Sáez	(substituted off) 74'
Substitutes:
GK	17	(Chile) Cristopher Toselli
DF	2	(Chile) Germán Lanaro	(substituted on) 81'
DF	21	(Chile) Raimundo Rebolledo
MF	20	(Chile) Carlos Lobos
MF	18	(Argentina) Diego Buonanotte	(substituted on) 74'
FW	16	(Chile) Jeisson Vargas
FW	30	(Chile) Diego Valencia	(substituted on) 81'
Manager:
(Argentina) Gustavo Quinteros

GK	1	(Chile) Ignacio González
RB	20	(Chile) Guillermo Soto	(substituted off) 78'
CB	2	(Uruguay) Alejandro González	(yellow card) 38'
CB	17	(Chile) Enzo Guerrero
LB	19	(Chile) Brayan Véjar
DFM	5	(Argentina) Julián Fernández	(yellow card) 44'
LCM	25	(Argentina) Agustín Farías	(yellow card) 44'
RCM	13	(Chile) César Cortés	(substituted off) 64'
AM	10	(Chile) Luis Jiménez (c)
AM	8	(Chile) Cristóbal Jorquera	(substituted off) 46'
CF	22	(Chile) Roberto Gutiérrez
Substitutes:
GK	12	(Chile) Fabián Cerda
DF	4	(Chile) Nicolás Díaz
MF	7	(Chile) Diego Rosende
MF	21	(Chile) Ignacio Ayala	(substituted on) 78'
MF	23	(Chile) Renato Tarifeño
FW	27	(Chile) Ignacio Herrera	(yellow card) 77'	(substituted on) 46'
FW	29	(Chile) Fabián Ahumada	(substituted on) 64'
Manager:
(Chile) Ivo Basay

Man of the Match:
César Pinares (Universidad Catolica)
Assistant referees:
Christian Schiemann
Edson Cisternas
Fourth official:
Eduardo Gamboa

Match rules

- 90 minutes.
- Penalty shoot-out if scores still level.
- Seven named substitutes.
- Maximum of three substitutions.

Champion

Champion
Universidad Católica
2nd title
