= Marcos Bolados =

Chilean footballer (born 1996)

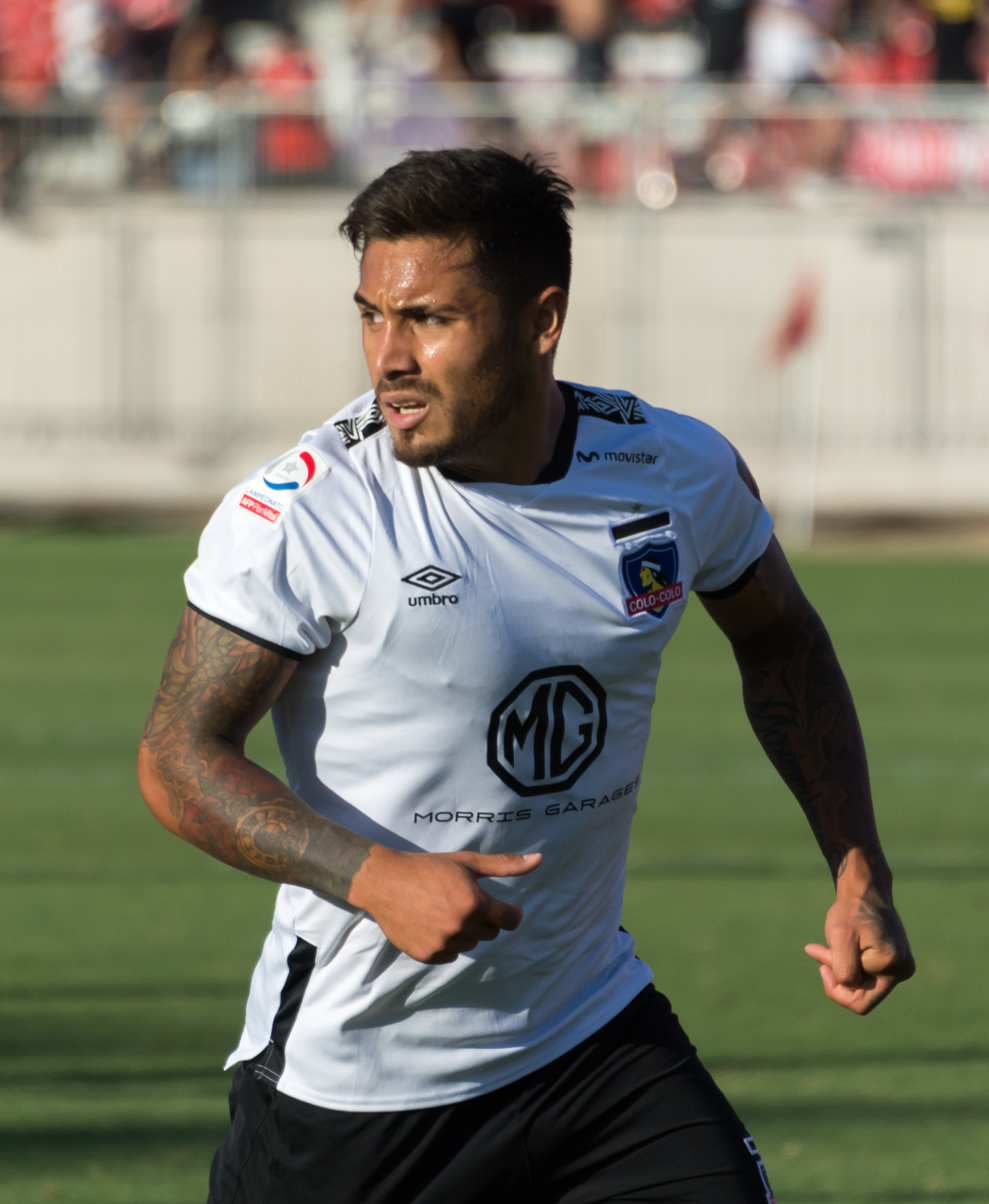

Personal information
- Full name: Marcos Nikolas Bolados Hidalgo
- Date of birth: 28 February 1996 (age 30)
- Place of birth: Antofagasta, Chile
- Height: 1.70 m (5 ft 7 in)
- Position: Forward

Team information
- Current team: Colo-Colo
- Number: 11

Youth career
- Deportes Antofagasta

Senior career*
Years	Team	Apps	(Gls)
2013–2016	Deportes Antofagasta	52	(5)
2016–	Colo-Colo	151	(25)
2018	→ Universidad Católica (loan)	18	(0)

International career^{‡}
2015	Chile U20	2	(0)
2018–	Chile	10	(2)
- * Club domestic league appearances and goals as of 22 June 2025 ‡ National team caps and goals as of 25 June 2024

Marcos Nikolas Bolados Hidalgo (born 28 February 1996) is a Chilean footballer that currently plays for Primera División club Colo-Colo.

== International career ==
Along with Chile U20, he won the L'Alcúdia Tournament in 2015.

Bolados was named in Chile's provisional squad for Copa América Centenario but was cut from the final squad.

He scored the winning goal on his Chile debut as they won 2–1 against Sweden on 24 March 2018.

== Career statistics ==
=== Club ===
As of 22 June 2025.

Club	Division	League			Cup		Continental		Total	
Club	Division	Season	Apps	Goals	Apps	Goals	Apps	Goals	Apps	Goals
Deportes Antofagasta	Primera División	2013	1	0	—		—		1	0
Deportes Antofagasta	Primera División	2013-14	1	0	—		—		1	0
Deportes Antofagasta	Primera División	2014-15	28	3	9	0	—		37	3
Deportes Antofagasta	Primera División	2015-16	22	2	6	1	—		28	3
Deportes Antofagasta	Total		52	5	15	1	0	0	67	6
Colo-Colo	Primera División	2016-17	10	0	2	0	—		12	0
Colo-Colo	Primera División	2017	3	0	3	0	—		6	0
Universidad Católica	Primera División	2018	18	0	1	0	—		19	0
Colo-Colo	Primera División	2019	12	2	7	2	—		19	4
Colo-Colo	Primera División	2020	17	2	1	0	6	0	24	2
Colo-Colo	Primera División	2021	26	7	7	2	—		33	9
Colo-Colo	Primera División	2022	27	3	5	0	5	0	37	3
Colo-Colo	Primera División	2023	26	3	8	2	5	1	39	6
Colo-Colo	Primera División	2024	25	6	3	0	14	1	42	7
Colo-Colo	Primera División	2025	5	2	5	0	2	0	12	2
Colo-Colo	Total		151	25	41	6	32	2	224	33
Career total			221	30	57	7	32	2	310	39

=== International ===
As of 25 June 2024.

Appearances and goals by national team and year
National team	Year	Apps	Goals
Chile	2018	4	1
Chile	2023	1	0
Chile	2024	5	1
Total		10	2

=== International goals ===
Scores and results list Chile's goal tally first.

No	Date	Venue	Opponent	Score	Result	Competition
1.	24 March 2018	Friends Arena, Solna, Sweden	Sweden	2–1	2–1	Friendly
2.	22 March 2024	Stadio Ennio Tardini, Parma, Italy	Albania	2–0	3–0	Friendly

== Honors ==
Colo-Colo

- Primera División (1): Transición 2017
- Copa Chile: 2016
- Supercopa de Chile: 2017

Universidad Católica

- Primera División (1): 2018

Chile U20

- L'Alcúdia International Tournament (1): 2015
