= 2016 Supercopa de Chile =

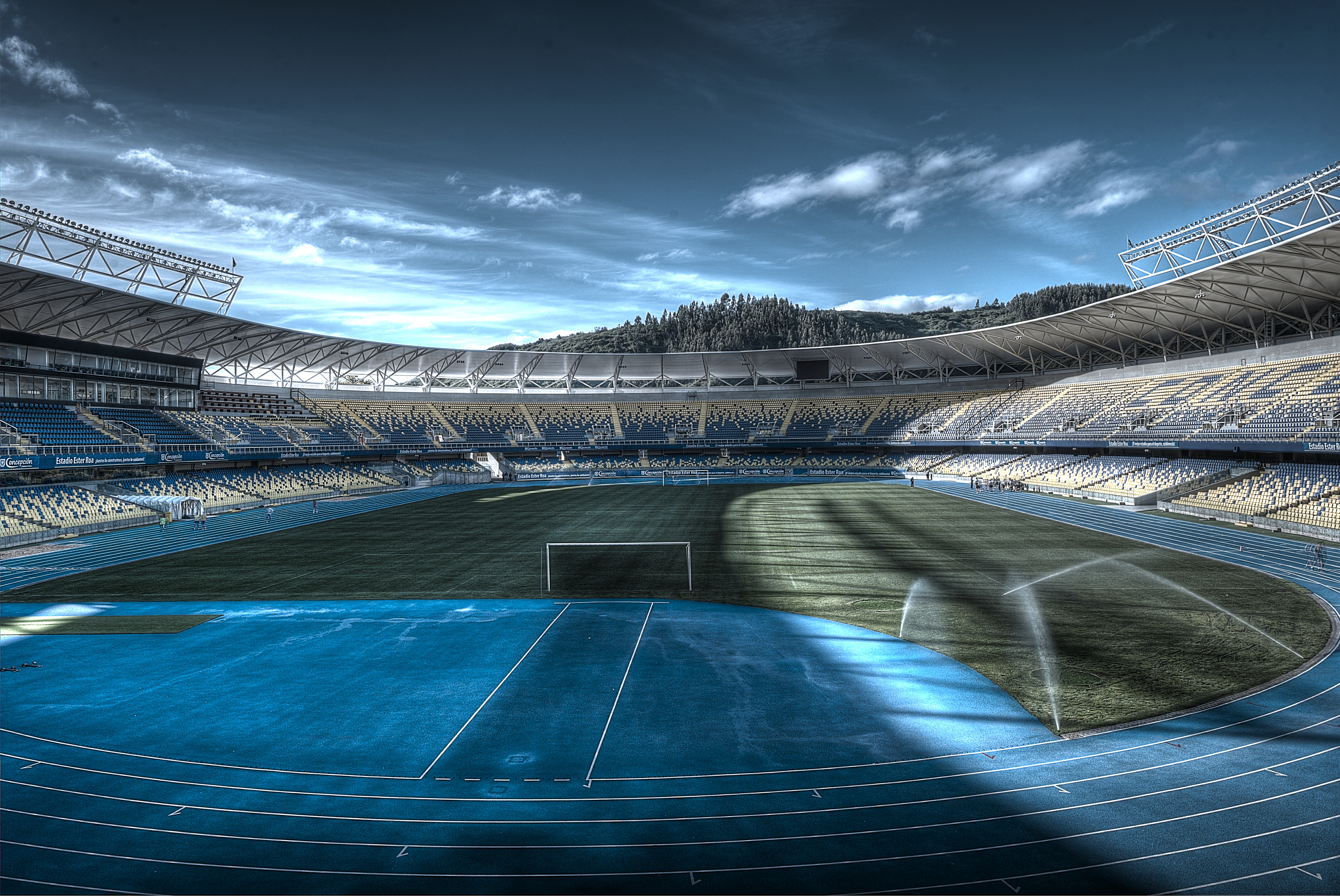
- Event: Supercopa de Chile 2016
Universidad Católica	Universidad de Chile
2	1
- Date: 15 September 2016
- Venue: Estadio Municipal de Concepción, Concepción
- CDF Man of the Match: Nicolás Castillo
- Easy Man of the Match: Nicolás Castillo
- Referee: Jorge Osorio
- Attendance: 27,000
- Weather: Clear; 20 °C (68 °F)

The 2016 Supercopa de Chile was the fourth edition of this championship organised by the Asociación Nacional de Fútbol Profesional (ANFP).

The match was played between the 2015-16 Primera División Best-Champions Universidad Católica, and the 2015 Copa Chile Winners Universidad de Chile.

== Road to the final ==
The two teams that disputed the Supercopa were Universidad Católica, that qualified as Clausura 2015-16 Champion and the Best Champion in the accumulated table, and Universidad de Chile, that qualified for the trophy dispute as the winner of the 2015 Copa Chile, winning Colo-Colo 1:1 (5:3 in penalties) at the Estadio La Portada.

Universidad Católica	Universidad de Chile
Clausura 2015-16 Champion and Best-Champion	Winner of the 2015 Copa Chile

== Details ==
15 September 2016
22:00

Universidad Católica	2–1 (a.e.t.)	Universidad de Chile
Castillo 42'; Fuenzalida 45+1'	Report	Fernández 44'

Estadio Municipal de Concepción, Concepción
Attendance: 27,000
Referee: Jorge Osorio

Universidad Catolica	Universidad de Chile

GK	1	(Chile) Cristopher Toselli
RB	4	(Chile) Cristián Álvarez (c)
CB	2	(Chile) Germán Lanaro (yellow card) 24'
CB	3	(Chile) Guillermo Maripán
LB	24	(Chile) Alfonso Parot
LCM	6	(Chile) César Fuentes
RCM	23	(Argentina) Enzo Kalinski
AM	18	(Argentina) Diego Buonanotte (substituted off) 84'
RW	19	(Chile) José Pedro Fuenzalida (substituted off) 89'
LW	16	(Argentina) Ricardo Noir (substituted off) 75'
CF	30	(Chile) Nicolás Castillo
Substitutes:
GK	21	(Argentina) Franco Costanzo
DF	13	(Chile) Benjamín Kuscevic
DF	29	(Chile) Stefano Magnasco (substituted on) 89'
MF	5	(Chile) Fabián Manzano (substituted on) 84'
MF	17	(Chile) Carlos Espinosa
FW	14	(Chile) David Llanos
FW	9	(Argentina) Sebastián Jaime (substituted on) 75'
Manager:
(Chile) Mario Salas

GK	25	(Chile) Johnny Herrera (c)
RB	16	(Argentina) Matías Rodríguez
CB	2	(Chile) Christian Vilches
CB	4	(Chile) Alejandro Contreras
LB	15	(Chile) Jean Beausejour	(substituted off) 87'
RCM	14	(Chile) Yerko Leiva	(substituted off) 68'
LCM	21	(Chile) Lorenzo Reyes
AM	22	(Argentina) Gustavo Lorenzetti
RW	19	(Chile) Juan Leiva	(yellow card) 76'
LW	28	(Argentina) Jonathan Zacaría
CF	10	(Argentina) Gastón Fernández
Substitutes:
GK	12	(Chile) Nelson Espinoza
DF	3	(Chile) Nicolás Ramírez
MF	27	(Argentina) Fabián Monzón
MF	6	(Chile) Sebastián Martínez
MF	8	(Chile) Franz Schultz
MF	7	(Chile) Nicolás Maturana	(substituted on) 68'
FW	24	(Chile) Mario Briceño	(substituted on) 87'
Manager:
(Argentina) Sebastián Beccacece

Man of the Match:
Nicolás Castillo (Universidad Catolica)
Assistant referees:
Raúl Orellana
Edson Cisternas
Fourth official:
Julio Bascuñán

Match rules

- 90 minutes.
- Penalty shoot-out if scores still level.
- Seven named substitutes.
- Maximum of three substitutions.

Champion

Champion
Universidad Católica
1st title

=== Statistics ===
First half
	UC	UCH
Goals scored	2	1
Total shots	7	5
Shots on target	3	2
Saves	0	2
Corner kicks	1	2
Fouls committed	3	1
Offsides	1	1
Yellow cards	1	1
Red cards	0	0

Second half
	UC	UCH
Goals scored	0	0
Total shots	3	3
Shots on target	0	1
Saves	3	1
Corner kicks	6	2
Fouls committed	1	6
Offsides	1	0
Yellow cards	0	2
Red cards	0	0

Overall
	UC	UCH
Goals scored	2	1
Total shots	9	8
Shots on target	4	2
Saves	6	8
Corner kicks	7	4
Fouls committed	16	13
Offsides	1	2
Yellow cards	1	1
Red cards	0	0
