= 2016–17 Campeonato Nacional Primera División =

Campeonato Nacional
- Season: 2016–17
- Champions: 2016 Apertura: Universidad Católica (12th title); 2017 Clausura: Universidad de Chile (18th title)
- Relegated: Cobresal
- 2017 Copa Libertadores: Universidad Católica; Deportes Iquique; Colo-Colo (cup winners); Unión Española
- 2017 Copa Sudamericana: O'Higgins; Palestino; Universidad de Chile; Everton (cup runners-up)
- 2018 Copa Libertadores: Universidad de Chile
- Matches: 240
- Goals: 676 (2.82 per match)
- Top goalscorer: 2016 Apertura: Nicolás Castillo (13 goals); 2017 Clausura: Felipe Mora (13 goals)

The 2016–17 Campeonato Nacional season was the 86th season of top-flight football in Chile. Universidad Católica were the defending champions.

== Format changes ==
Same as last season: Apertura and Clausura format, without playoffs.

== Teams ==
=== Stadia and locations ===
Locations of the 2016–17 Chilean Primera División teams.

Team	City	Stadium
Audax Italiano	Santiago	Bicentenario de La Florida
Cobresal	El Salvador	El Cobre
Colo-Colo	Santiago	Monumental David Arellano
Deportes Antofagasta	Antofagasta	Calvo y Bascuñán
Deportes Iquique	Iquique	Cavancha
Deportes Temuco	Temuco	Germán Becker
Everton	Viña del Mar	Sausalito
Huachipato	Talcahuano	CAP
O'Higgins	Rancagua	El Teniente
Palestino	Santiago	Municipal de La Cisterna
San Luis	Quillota	Lucio Fariña Fernández
Santiago Wanderers	Valparaíso	Elías Figueroa Brander
Unión Española	Santiago	Santa Laura-Universidad SEK
Universidad Católica	Santiago	San Carlos de Apoquindo
Universidad de Chile	Santiago	Nacional Julio Martínez Prádanos
Universidad de Concepción	Concepción	Alcaldesa Ester Roa Rebolledo

=== Personnel and kits ===
Team	Head coach	Captain	Kit manufacturer	Sponsors
Audax Italiano	(Chile) Hugo Vilches	(Chile) Nicolás Peric	Macron	Traverso
Cobresal	(Argentina) Dalcio Giovagnoli	(Chile) Patricio Jerez	Lotto	PF
Colo-Colo	(Argentina) Pablo Guede	(Chile) Gonzalo Fierro	Under Armour	DirecTV
Deportes Antofagasta	(Chile) Fernando Vergara	(Chile) Cristián Rojas	Cafu	Minera Escondida
Deportes Iquique	(Chile) Jaime Vera	(Chile) Rodrigo Naranjo	Rete	UNAP
Deportes Temuco	(Chile) Luis Landeros	(Chile) Luis Marín	Joma	Rosen
Everton	(Argentina) Pablo Sánchez	(Chile) Marcos Velásquez	Pirma	Viña del Mar-Fox Sports-Claro
Huachipato	(Chile) Miguel Ponce	(Argentina) Omar Merlo	Mitre	
O'Higgins	(Argentina) Cristián Arán	(Chile) Albert Acevedo	New Balance	VTR
Palestino	(Chile) Nicolás Córdova	(Argentina) Agustín Farías	Training	Bank of Palestine
San Luis	(Chile) Miguel Ramírez	(Chile) Daniel Vicencio	Luanvi	PF
Santiago Wanderers	(Uruguay) Eduardo Espinel	(Chile) Gabriel Castellón	Macron	Terminal Pacifico Sur Valparaiso
Unión Española	(Argentina) Martín Palermo	(Chile) Jorge Ampuero	Kappa	Universidad SEK
Universidad Católica	(Chile) Mario Salas	(Chile) Cristian Álvarez	Umbro	DirecTV
Universidad de Chile	(Chile) Víctor Hugo Castañeda	(Chile) Johnny Herrera	Adidas	Claro
Universidad de Concepción	(Chile) Ronald Fuentes	(Argentina) Cristián Muñoz	KS7	Universidad de Concepción

== Torneo Apertura ==
=== Standings ===
Pos	Team	Pld	W	D	L	GF	GA	GD	Pts	Qualification
1	Universidad Católica (C)	15	9	4	2	37	18	+19	31	2017 Copa Libertadores group stage
2	Deportes Iquique	15	8	4	3	28	22	+6	28	2017 Copa Libertadores group stage
3	Unión Española	15	8	3	4	27	20	+7	27	Runners-up playoff
4	O'Higgins	15	7	5	3	23	15	+8	26	Runners-up playoff
5	Colo-Colo	15	6	5	4	26	20	+6	23	2017 Copa Libertadores second stage (Note: Colo-Colo qualified for the 2017 Copa Libertadores as Copa Chile champions.)
6	Palestino	15	6	3	6	25	19	+6	21	2017 Copa Sudamericana first stage
7	Universidad de Chile	15	5	6	4	23	22	+1	21	2017 Copa Sudamericana first stage
8	San Luis	15	6	3	6	21	22	−1	21	
9	Deportes Antofagasta	15	5	4	6	17	22	−5	19	
10	Huachipato	15	4	6	5	24	24	0	18	
11	Santiago Wanderers	15	5	3	7	13	20	−7	18	
12	Deportes Temuco	15	5	1	9	15	21	−6	16	
13	Cobresal	15	4	4	7	14	21	−7	16	
14	Everton	15	3	6	6	22	28	−6	15	2017 Copa Sudamericana first stage (Note: Everton qualified for the 2017 Copa Sudamericana as Copa Chile runners-up.)
15	Audax Italiano	15	4	3	8	17	28	−11	15	
16	Universidad de Concepción	15	4	2	9	15	25	−10	14	

Updated to match(es) played on 10 December 2016. Source: ANFP, Soccerway
Rules for classification: 1) points; 2) goal difference; 3) number of goals scored.
(C) Champions

=== Results ===
Home \ Away	AUD	CSL	CC	ANT	DIQ	TEM	EVE	HUA	OHI	PAL	SL	SW	UE	UC	UCH	UDC
Audax Italiano			0–2	1–0	1–2	1–1	0–3			2–1	1–2		3–1			
Cobresal	1–1				1–2				2–1	0–2		1–1	0–2		2–0	2–0
Colo-Colo		3–0			0–2	0–2	4–2				3–3	1–1	1–2		2–0	
Deportes Antofagasta		0–0	2–2		0–0	0–2		3–0			1–0			1–5		
Deportes Iquique							3–1		1–1	2–2	3–1	3–0		2–6		0–2
Deportes Temuco		1–2			1–3						2–0	2–3	1–2	0–2	0–3	1–0
Everton		2–1		0–3		1–2			2–2	1–2	1–1		1–1		2–2	
Huachipato	3–1	4–1	2–2		1–2	1–0	2–2						2–2			
O'Higgins	1–2		1–0	3–1		1–0		2–0		3–2		4–0		1–1		
Palestino			1–2	5–1		2–0		2–1			3–4	0–0	2–0			
San Luis		1–0						1–1	0–1			2–1		2–0	2–4	2–0
Santiago Wanderers	2–0			0–1			0–1	0–2					0–2		1–0	2–0
Unión Española				2–1	3–1				1–1		1–0			3–4	2–3	3–0
Universidad Católica	4–1	1–1	2–2				3–1	2–1		1–1		1–2				2–0
Universidad de Chile	2–2			1–1	2–2			2–2	0–0	1–0				0–3		3–1
Universidad de Concepción	3–1		0–2	1–2			2–2	2–2	3–1	1–0						

Updated to match(es) played on 10 December 2016. Source: Soccerway
Legend: Blue = home team win; Yellow = draw; Red = away team win.

=== Runners-up playoff ===
The runners-up playoff was played between:

- O'Higgins (2016 Clausura third place)
- Unión Española (2016 Apertura third place)

The winner qualified for the 2017 Copa Libertadores second stage, while the loser qualified for the 2017 Copa Sudamericana first stage.

17 December 2016
19:00

Unión Española	1–1	O'Higgins
Churín 40'	Report	Muñoz 70'
Penalties
Churín (penalty scored); Larenas (penalty scored); Aranguiz (penalty missed); Pinares (penalty scored); Salom (penalty scored)	4–2	(penalty missed) Opazo; (penalty scored) Barriga; (penalty scored) Muñoz; (penalty missed) Insaurralde

Estadio Nacional, Santiago
Attendance: 6,153
Referee: Patricio Polic

=== Top goalscorers ===
Rank	Name	Club	Goals
1	(Chile) Nicolás Castillo	Universidad Católica	13
2	(Argentina) Leandro Benegas	Palestino	10
2	(Argentina) Diego Churín	Unión Española	10
2	(Chile) Esteban Paredes	Colo-Colo	10
5	(Argentina) Diego Buonanotte	Universidad Católica	8
5	(Argentina) Cristian Insaurralde	O'Higgins	8
5	(Palestine) Carlos Salom	Unión Española	8

Source: Soccerway

== Torneo Clausura ==
=== Standings ===
Pos	Team	Pld	W	D	L	GF	GA	GD	Pts	Qualification
1	Universidad de Chile (C)	15	9	3	3	24	11	+13	30	2018 Copa Libertadores group stage
2	Colo-Colo	15	8	5	2	29	13	+16	29	Runners-up playoff
3	Universidad de Concepción	15	6	6	3	16	13	+3	24	
4	Universidad Católica	15	7	2	6	25	23	+2	23	
5	Unión Española	15	6	4	5	25	21	+4	22	
6	Deportes Iquique	15	5	7	3	23	20	+3	22	
7	Audax Italiano	15	6	4	5	23	23	0	22	
8	O'Higgins	15	6	4	5	20	20	0	22	
9	Deportes Temuco	15	6	4	5	17	17	0	22	
10	Everton	15	5	6	4	19	14	+5	21	
11	Deportes Antofagasta	15	4	6	5	21	18	+3	18	
12	San Luis	15	5	3	7	19	25	−6	18	
13	Huachipato	15	5	3	7	17	25	−8	18	
14	Palestino	15	3	5	7	16	25	−9	14	
15	Santiago Wanderers	15	3	4	8	19	24	−5	13	
16	Cobresal	15	2	2	11	16	37	−21	8	

Updated to match(es) played on 21 May 2017. Source: ANFP, Soccerway
Rules for classification: 1) points; 2) goal difference; 3) number of goals scored.
(C) Champions

=== Results ===
Home \ Away	AUD	CSL	CC	ANT	DIQ	TEM	EVE	HUA	OHI	PAL	SL	SW	UE	UC	UCH	UDC
Audax Italiano		2–0						3–2	2–1			3–0		5–2	0–3	0–3
Cobresal			1–3	3–1		1–2	1–1	3–2			1–2			1–2		
Colo-Colo	4–0			1–1				0–0	2–1	0–0				2–0		3–0
Deportes Antofagasta	1–0						0–2		0–0	1–1		1–1	1–1		0–1	5–0
Deportes Iquique	2–2	3–1	3–2	2–4		0–0		1–2					2–2		2–0	
Deportes Temuco	1–1		2–2	2–0			0–2	1–0	2–0	1–0						
Everton	2–2		2–3		0–0			2–0				2–2		2–1		2–0
Huachipato				0–0					0–2	3–2	3–2	1–4		2–1	2–1	0–0
O'Higgins		4–1			1–1		1–0				2–1		2–0		0–3	1–1
Palestino	0–2	3–2			0–2		1–0		1–1					0–0	1–3	1–2
San Luis	1–0		1–0	0–5	2–3	1–1	1–1			2–2			3–2			
Santiago Wanderers		1–1	0–2		1–1	1–2			1–2	5–2	0–3			3–0		
Unión Española	1–1	3–0	0–3			5–2	2–1	3–0		1–2		1–0				
Universidad Católica				4–1	2–0	2–1			5–2		1–0		2–3		3–1	
Universidad de Chile		4–0	2–2			1–0	0–0				1–0	2–0	2–1			
Universidad de Concepción		4–0			1–1	1–0					3–0	1–0	0–0	0–0	0–0	

Updated to match(es) played on 21 May 2017. Source: Soccerway
Legend: Blue = home team win; Yellow = draw; Red = away team win.

=== Top goalscorers ===
Rank	Name	Club	Goals
1	(Chile) Felipe Mora	Universidad de Chile	13
2	(Chile) Esteban Paredes	Colo-Colo	11
3	(Argentina) Cristian Insaurralde	O'Higgins	7
3	(Paraguay) Cris Martínez	Deportes Temuco	7
3	(Chile) Álvaro Ramos	Deportes Iquique	7
3	(Argentina) Marcos Riquelme	Audax Italiano	7

Source: Soccerway

== Aggregate table ==
Pos	Team	Pld	W	D	L	GF	GA	GD	Pts	Qualification or relegation
1	Universidad Católica (C)	30	16	6	8	62	41	+21	54	2017 Supercopa de Chile
2	Colo-Colo	30	14	10	6	55	33	+22	52	2017 Supercopa de Chile
3	Universidad de Chile (C)	30	14	9	7	47	33	+14	51	
4	Deportes Iquique	30	13	11	6	51	42	+9	50	
5	Unión Española	30	14	7	9	52	41	+11	49	
6	O'Higgins	30	13	9	8	43	35	+8	48	
7	San Luis	30	11	6	13	40	47	−7	39	
8	Deportes Temuco	30	11	5	14	32	38	−6	38	
9	Universidad de Concepción	30	10	8	12	31	38	−7	38	
10	Deportes Antofagasta	30	9	10	11	38	40	−2	37	
11	Audax Italiano	30	10	7	13	40	51	−11	37	
12	Everton	30	8	12	10	41	42	−1	36	
13	Huachipato	30	9	9	12	41	49	−8	36	
14	Palestino	30	9	8	13	41	44	−3	35	
15	Santiago Wanderers	30	8	7	15	32	44	−12	31	
16	Cobresal (R)	30	6	6	18	30	58	−28	24	Relegation to Primera B

Updated to match(es) played on 21 May 2017. Source: ANFP
Rules for classification: 1) points; 2) goal difference; 3) number of goals scored.
(C) Champions; (R) Relegated
