= 2025 Supercopa de Chile =

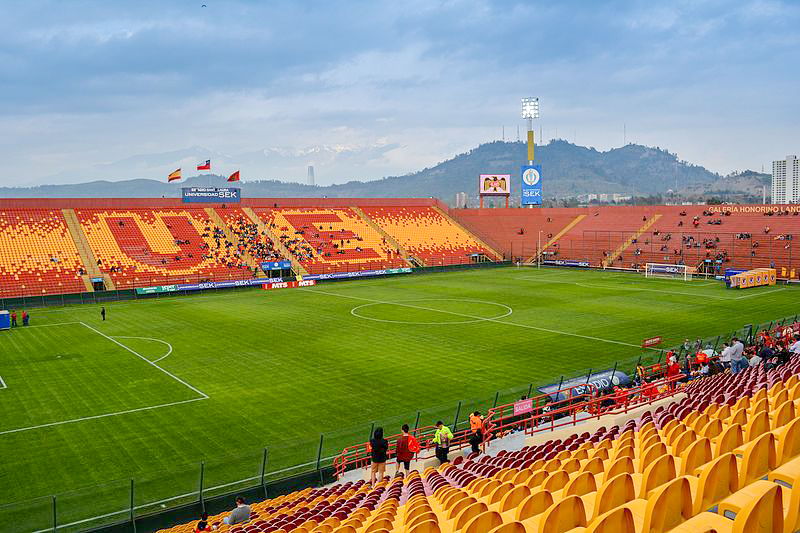
- Estadio Santa Laura hosted the match
- Event: Supercopa Construmart 2025
Colo-Colo	Universidad de Chile
0	3
- Date: 14 September 2025
- Venue: Estadio Santa Laura, Santiago
- Referee: Felipe González
- Attendance: 3,000

The 2025 Supercopa de Chile, known as the Supercopa Construmart 2025 for sponsorship purposes, was the thirteenth edition of the Supercopa de Chile, competition organised by the Asociación Nacional de Fútbol Profesional (ANFP). It was played by the 2024 Chilean Primera División champions Colo-Colo and the 2024 Copa Chile champions Universidad de Chile at Estadio Santa Laura in Santiago on 14 September 2025.

In the match, Universidad de Chile defeated Colo-Colo 3–0 to claim their second Supercopa de Chile title.

== Teams ==
The two teams that contested the Supercopa were Colo-Colo, who qualified as 2024 Primera División champions and Universidad de Chile, who qualified for the match as 2024 Copa Chile champions, defeating Ñublense in the final by a 1–0 score. This was Colo-Colo's seventh participation in the competition, with four titles, whilst Universidad de Chile played their fourth Supercopa, having won the title in 2015.

It was also the first time Colo-Colo and Universidad de Chile faced each other in a Supercopa de Chile match.

Team	Qualification	Previous appearances (bold indicates winners)
Colo-Colo	2024 Primera División champions	6 (**2017**, **2018**, 2020, **2022**, 2023, **2024**)
Universidad de Chile	2024 Copa Chile champions	3 (2013, **2015**, 2016)

== Venue and format changes ==
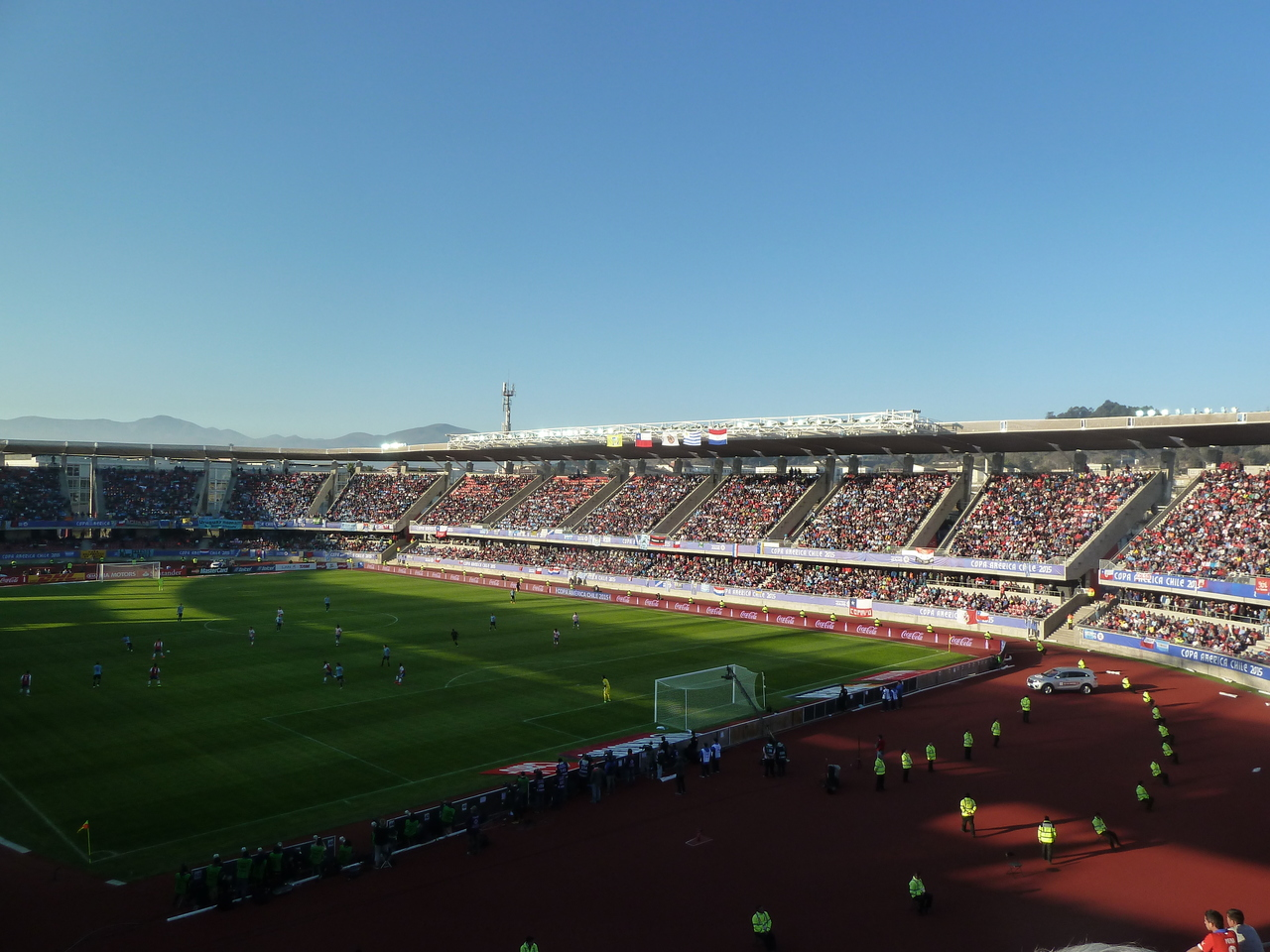
Estadio La Portada in La Serena was originally set to host the match.

With Colo-Colo and Universidad de Chile having qualified to play the Supercopa de Chile, it was originally planned to deviate from the usual single-match format for the competition and have the Supercopa played over two legs due to safety concerns, with the fans of each club being entitled to only attend the match hosted by their club, however the competition could not be scheduled over two legs during its usual January timeframe given that Universidad de Chile could not host their home leg during that month, with their regular home stadium Estadio Nacional being unavailable and no other alternate stadiums willing to host Universidad de Chile's home match.

Since it became unfeasible to play the Supercopa over two legs in January, it was decided to return to the single-match format, but the cities of Concepción and Temuco both declined to host the match on safety grounds. Eventually, an agreement was reached to schedule the match for 25 January 2025 at Estadio La Portada in La Serena with the attendance of local fans only, however, four days before the date the match was scheduled to be played the ANFP announced its suspension as it had not been granted authorization by the Presidential Delegation of the Coquimbo Region to hold the event while also condemning threats from Colo-Colo's barra brava group Garra Blanca in the previous days.

With the suspension of the match being confirmed, Aníbal Mosa, president of the Blanco y Negro concessionaire that manages Colo-Colo, expressed his support for having the Supercopa played as a two-legged series which he had originally proposed to the ANFP. On 29 January, ANFP president Pablo Milad confirmed that the Supercopa would change its format and would be contested over two legs, being tentatively rescheduled for July 2025. On 9 April, the ANFP's Professional Leagues manager Yamal Rajab informed that the Supercopa would be played over two legs between 15 and 22 July 2025, but this plan also fell through since Universidad de Chile qualified to play the knockout round play-offs of the Copa Sudamericana, which were set to be played in those dates.

Given the difficulties on dates and stadiums to play the competition, the ANFP presented a final proposal to play the Supercopa under its original format of a single match on neutral ground on 13 September in Santiago with fans of both teams in attendance, and the first stadium option to host the match was Estadio Bicentenario de La Florida, which was not approved by the local authorities, with the mayor of La Florida proposing instead to allow the match to be played behind closed doors. Eventually, on 20 August it was confirmed that the match would be played in the Chilean capital, but at Estadio Santa Laura in the commune of Independencia.

== Details ==
14 September 2025
15:00 UTC−3

Colo-Colo	0–3	Universidad de Chile
	Report	Sepúlveda 18'; Guerra 37'; Assadi 50'

Estadio Santa Laura, Independencia, Santiago
Attendance: 3,000
Referee: Felipe González

**Colo-Colo**	**Universidad de Chile**

GK	30	(Chile) Fernando de Paul
RB	22	(Chile) Mauricio Isla		(substituted off) 66'
CB	2	(Chile) Jonathan Villagra		(substituted off) 44'
CB	6	(Chile) Sebastián Vegas	(red card) 30'
LB	21	(Chile) Erick Wiemberg	(yellow card) 28'
DCM	8	(Chile) Esteban Pavez (c)		(substituted off) 46'
RM	8	(Chile) Vicente Pizarro
CM	10	(Argentina) Claudio Aquino	(yellow card) 15'	(substituted off) 46'
CM	24	(Chile) Leandro Hernández		(substituted off) 33'
LM	32	(Chile) Lucas Cepeda
CF	9	(Argentina) Javier Correa		(substituted off) 33'
Substitutes:
GK	12	(Chile) Eduardo Villanueva
DF	3	(Chile) Daniel Gutiérrez	(yellow card) 45+5'	(substituted on) 44'
DF	13	(Chile) Bruno Gutiérrez
DF	15	(Syria) Emiliano Amor	(yellow card) 71'	(substituted on) 33'
DF	17	(Chile) Cristian Riquelme
MF	5	(Chile) Víctor Méndez		(substituted on) 46'
MF	23	(Chile) Arturo Vidal	(yellow card) 90+6'	(substituted on) 46'
MF	25	(Chile) Tomás Alarcón
FW	11	(Chile) Marcos Bolados		(substituted on) 66'
FW	19	(Uruguay) Salomón Rodríguez		(substituted on) 33'
FW	36	(Chile) Jerall Astudillo
FW	49	(Haiti) Manley Clerveaux
Manager:
(Argentina) Fernando Ortiz

GK	25	(Chile) Gabriel Castellón
CB	17	(Chile) Fabián Hormazábal
CB	2	(Argentina) Franco Calderón
CB	22	(Chile) Matías Zaldivia	(yellow card) 63'	(substituted off) 90+4'
RM	7	(Chile) Maximiliano Guerrero
CM	21	(Chile) Marcelo Díaz (c)		(substituted off) 85'
CM	20	(Chile) Charles Aránguiz	(yellow card) 6'	(substituted off) 79'
CM	16	(Chile) Matías Sepúlveda		(substituted off) 84'
LM	19	(Chile) Javier Altamirano	(yellow card) 25'
CF	11	(Chile) Nicolás Guerra	(yellow card) 71'	(substituted off) 74'
CF	10	(Chile) Lucas Assadi	(yellow card) 9'	(substituted off) 80'
Substitutes:
GK	1	(Chile) Christopher Toselli
DF	3	(Chile) Ignacio Tapia		(substituted on) 90+4'
DF	6	(Chile) Nicolás Fernández		(substituted on) 79'
DF	13	(Chile) David Retamal
DF	15	(Argentina) Felipe Salomoni		(substituted on) 84'
MF	14	(Uruguay) Sebastián Rodríguez		(substituted on) 85'
MF	23	(Chile) Ignacio Vásquez
MF	24	(Chile) Antonio Díaz
MF	40	(Chile) Rubén Vera
FW	9	(Argentina) Leandro Fernández		(substituted on) 80'
FW	27	(Argentina) Rodrigo Contreras		(substituted on) 74'
FW	32	(Chile) Benjamín Aravena
Manager:
(Argentina) Gustavo Álvarez

Assistant referees:
Miguel Rocha
Juan Serrano
Fourth official:
Mathías Riquelme
Video assistant referee:
Piero Maza
Assistant video assistant referee:
Carlos Venegas

**Match rules**

- 90 minutes.
- 30 minutes of extra time if necessary.
- Penalty shoot-out if scores still level.
- Twelve named substitutes.
- Maximum of five substitutions.
