= Brayan Véjar =

Chilean footballer (born 1995)

Bryan Véjar
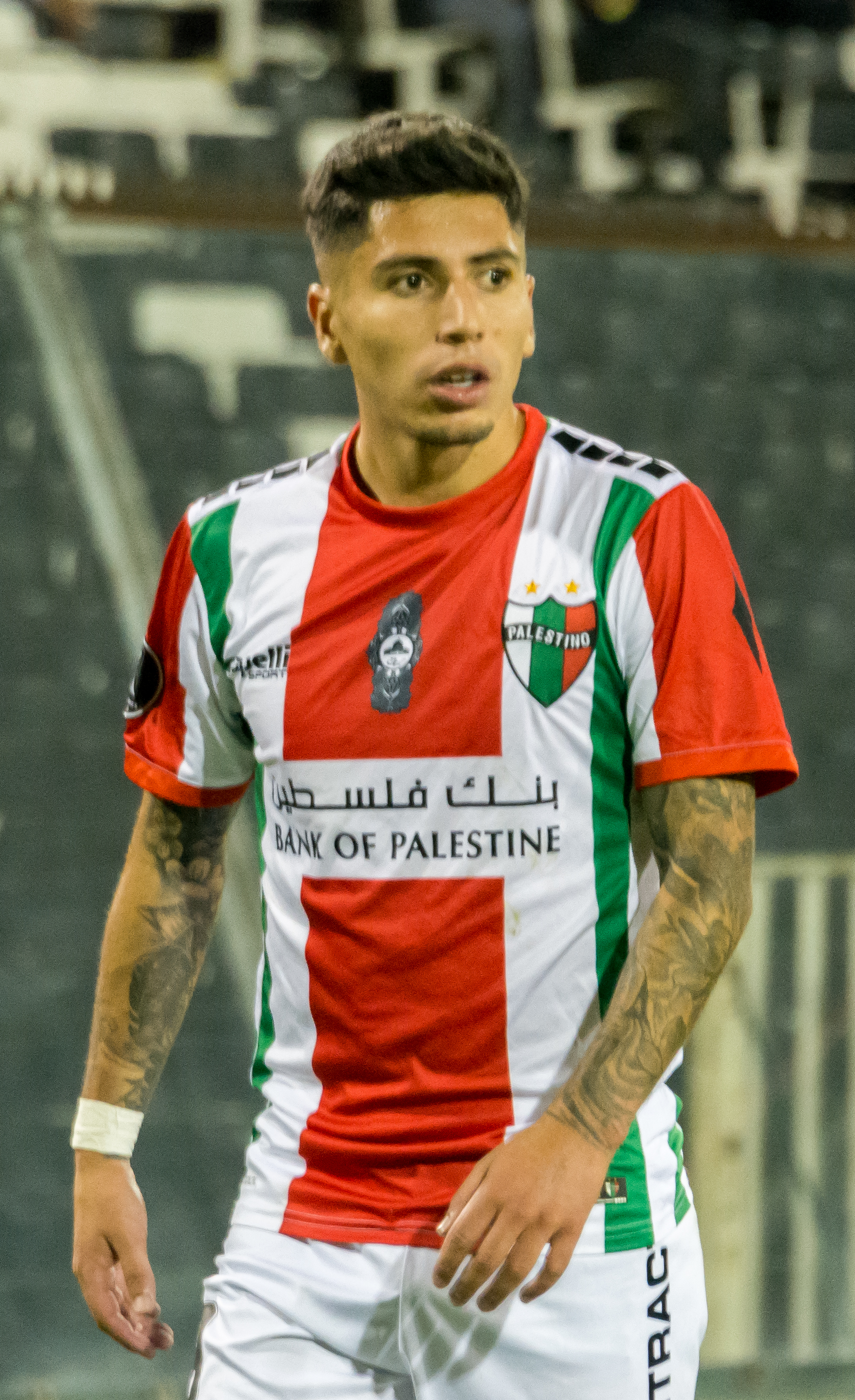
- Véjar with Palestino in 2019

Personal information
- Full name: Bryan Alfonso Véjar Utreras
- Date of birth: 14 July 1995 (age 31)
- Place of birth: Talcahuano, Chile
- Height: 1.68 m (5 ft 6 in)
- Position: Full-back

Team information
- Current team: Deportes Concepción (on loan from Unión Española)

Youth career
- 2000–2014: Huachipato

Senior career*
Years	Team	Apps	(Gls)
2012–2016	Huachipato	61	(3)
2016–2021	Colo-Colo	55	(2)
2019	→ Palestino (loan)	23	(1)
2021–2024	Palestino	78	(3)
2025–	Unión Española	12	(0)
2026–	→ Deportes Concepción (loan)	0	(0)

International career
2015	Chile U20	1	(0)
- * Club domestic league appearances and goals as of 11 January 2026

Bryan Alfonso Véjar Utreras (born 14 July 1995) is a Chilean footballer who plays as a full-back for Chilean Primera División side Deportes Concepción on loan from Unión Española.

== Club career ==
He made his professional debut playing for Huachipato on May 11, 2013. On that day, his team defeated Santiago Wanderers 3 goals to 1.

On August 4, 2016, it was officially announced his departure to Colo Colo, by petition of the current coach Pablo Guede. On August 4, 2021, he moved to Palestino after ending his contract with Colo-Colo.

Véjar signed with Unión Española for the 2025 season. He was loaned out to Deportes Concepción in January 2026.

=== Seven-a-side football ===
Still a player of Palestino, he joined the Chilean seven-a-side football club Red Lions in November 2023 for the championship Legends Cup as coach, with the also active footballer Martín Rodríguez as player.

== International career ==
Véjar was one of the players selected by former Chilean coach Jorge Sampaoli to spar with the Chile National team for the World cup Brazil 2014. After, he represented Chile U20 at the 2015 South American U-20 Championship, making one appearance.

In 2020, he took part in a training microcycle of the Chile senior team.

== Honours ==
Colo-Colo

- Primera División (1): 2017 Transición
- Copa Chile (2): 2016, 2019
- Supercopa de Chile (2): 2017, 2018
