= Miguel Jiménez (Chilean footballer) =

Chilean footballer (born 1980)

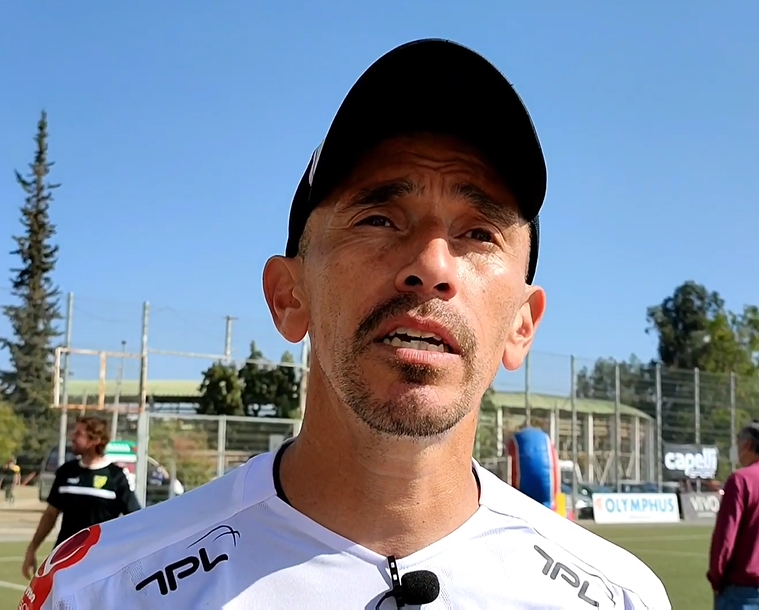
- Jiménez in 2022

Personal information
- Full name: Miguel Hernán Jiménez Aracena
- Date of birth: 12 December 1980 (age 45)
- Place of birth: Coltauco, Chile
- Height: 1.81 m (5 ft 11 in)
- Position: Goalkeeper

Youth career
- 1995–2000: Cobreloa

Senior career*
Years	Team	Apps	(Gls)
2000–2004	Cobreloa	0	(0)
2000–2001	→ General Velásquez (loan)	–	(–)
2002–2003	→ Iberia (loan)	–	(–)
2003–2004	→ Deportes Antofagasta (loan)	0	(0)
2005–2007	Lota Schwager	42	(0)
2008–2010	Deportes Iquique	3	(0)
2011–2012	Ñublense	25	(0)
2013–2015	Huachipato	17	(0)
2015–2016	Universidad de Chile	4	(0)
2016–2017	Iberia	34	(0)
2018	Fernández Vial	25	(0)
2019–2020	Ñublense	18	(0)
2021	Magallanes	10	(0)
2021	Deportes Concepción	10	(0)
2022	Rangers	24	(0)
Total		212	(0)

Managerial career
- 2023–2024: Huachipato (gk coach)
- 2025–: Ñublense (gk coach)
- * Club domestic league appearances and goals

Miguel Hernán Jiménez Aracena (born 12 December 1980) is a Chilean former footballer who played as a goalkeeper.

== Playing career ==
=== Early career ===
Born in Coltauco, he began his football career at Cobreloa's youth set-up aged 15.

=== Lota Schwager ===
On 17 March 2007, he was a starter in the historical 2–2 away draw of Lota with Colo-Colo at Estadio Monumental David Arellano.

=== Ñublense ===
On 6 January 2011, he joined Primera División de Chile side Ñublense.

=== Huachipato ===
On 27 December 2012, it was confirmed that Huachipato —then freshly Chilean league champion— hired him to challenge the goal with keeper Nery Veloso.

=== Universidad de Chile ===
On 7 January 2015, it was reported that Jiménez was signed by Club Universidad de Chile. Then, two days later he was officially presented alongside Matías Rodríguez (club's idol) during a press conference.

On 8 March 2015, he debuted in a 1–0 away win over San Marcos de Arica at Carlos Dittborn Stadium, where he performed well.

=== Iberia ===
In mid-2016, he moved to Deportes Iberia from Los Ángeles, Chile (VII Region of Maule). He arrived there after have agreeing a two-year deal with the mission to replace to goalkeeper Franco Cabrera.

=== Fernández Vial ===
On 9 February 2018, he was signed by third-tier team Arturo Fernández Vial for play the Segunda División Profesional de Chile under orders of the Argentinian coach Esteban Fuertes, former footballer who played in Chile.

=== Return to Ñublense ===
On 18 December 2018, it was reported by ANFP website that Jiménez returned to Ñublense to face the 2019 Primera B de Chile tournament.

=== Rangers ===
He retired at the end of the 2022 season, as a player of Rangers in the Primera B de Chile.

== Coaching career ==
Following his retirement, Jiménez joined the technical staff of Huachipato as a goalkeeping coach. In December 2024, he switched to Ñublense.

== Honours ==
Deportes Iquique

- Primera B de Chile (1): 2010
- Copa Chile (1): 2010

Universidad de Chile

- Copa Chile (1): 2015
- Supercopa de Chile (1): 2015
