= 2024 Supercopa de Chile =

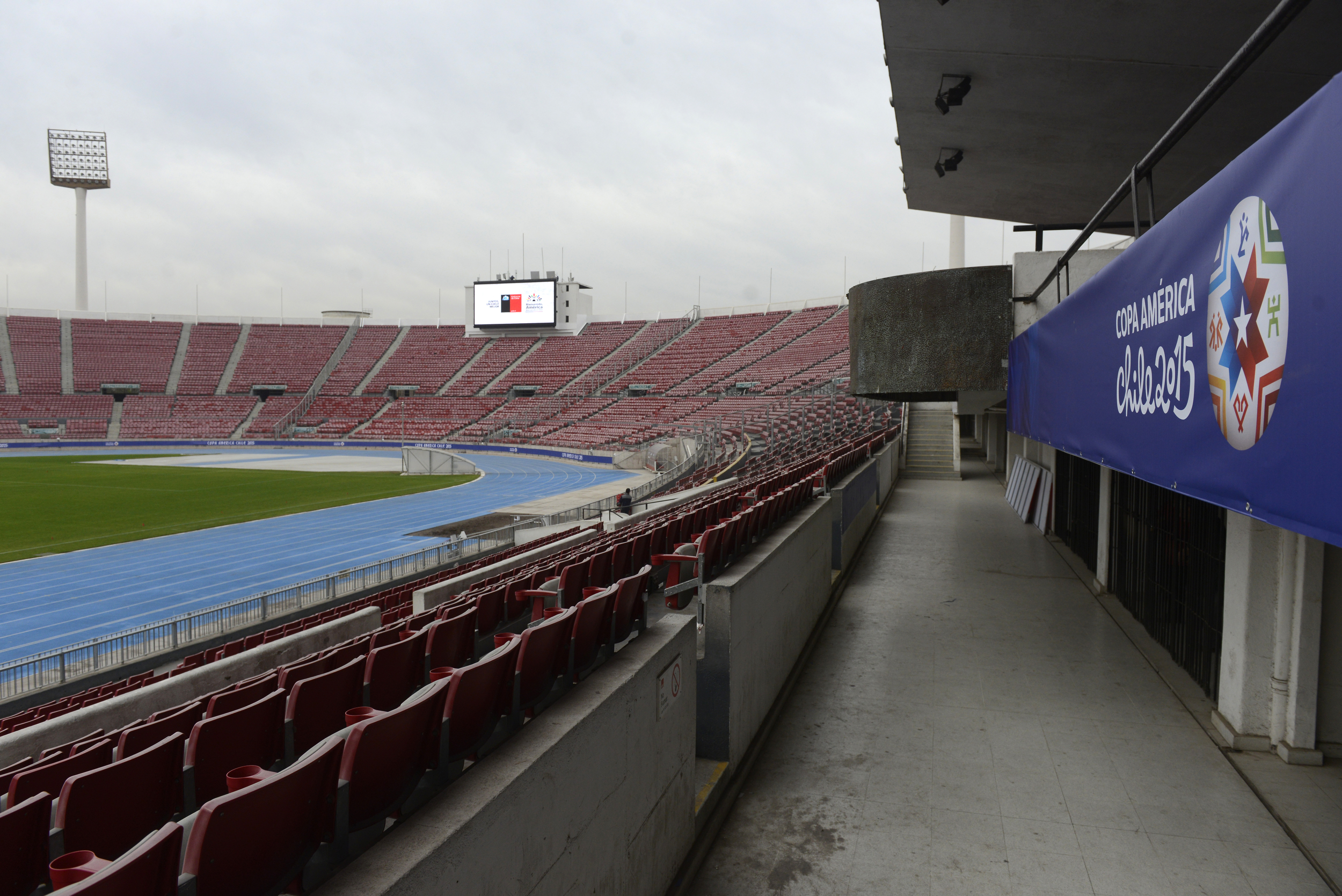
- Estadio Nacional Julio Martínez Prádanos in Santiago hosted the match
- Event: Supercopa Coca-Cola Sin Azúcar 2024
Huachipato	Colo-Colo
0	2
- Match suspended after 78 minutes due to incidents, with Colo-Colo winning 2–0.
- Date: 11 February 2024; resumed on 13 November 2024
- Venue: Estadio Nacional in Santiago; remainder moved to Estadio El Teniente in Rancagua
- Referee: José Cabero; replaced by Piero Maza for the resumption

The 2024 Supercopa de Chile, known as the Supercopa Coca-Cola Sin Azúcar 2024 for sponsorship purposes, was the twelfth edition of the Supercopa de Chile, competition organised by the Asociación Nacional de Fútbol Profesional (ANFP). The match was played by the 2023 Chilean Primera División champions Huachipato and the 2023 Copa Chile champions Colo-Colo on 11 February 2024 at Estadio Nacional Julio Martínez Prádanos in Santiago.

The match was suspended after 78 minutes of play with Colo-Colo leading Huachipato 2–0 due to incidents caused by Colo-Colo fans. On 12 February 2024, ANFP chairman Pablo Milad announced that the remainder of the match would be played on a date and time to be confirmed.

On 31 October 2024, almost nine months after the match was suspended, ANFP finally scheduled the remaining time of the match for 13 November 2024 at Estadio El Teniente in Rancagua, behind closed doors. Colo-Colo ended up winning their fourth Supercopa de Chile title, by the same score as it was at the time of suspension of the match.

== Qualified teams ==
The two teams that contested the Supercopa were Huachipato, who qualified as 2023 Primera División champions and Colo-Colo, who qualified for the match as 2023 Copa Chile champions, defeating Magallanes in the final by a 3–1 score.

Team	Qualification	Previous appearances (bold indicates winners)
Huachipato	2023 Primera División champions	None
Colo-Colo	2023 Copa Chile champions	5 (**2017**, **2018**, 2020, **2022**, 2023)

== Details ==
11 February 2024 (Note: The final minutes of the match were played on 13 November 2024, 17:30 UTC−3 at Estadio El Teniente, Rancagua.)
19:00 UTC−3

Huachipato	0–2	Colo-Colo
	Report	Palacios 10'; Vidal 21' (pen.)

Estadio Nacional Julio Martínez Prádanos, Santiago
Referee: José Cabero

Assistant referees:
Claudio Urrutia
Alan Sandoval
Fourth official:
Piero Maza
Video assistant referee:
Juan Lara
Assistant video assistant referees:
Carlos Venegas
Reiniero Alvarado

**Match rules**

- 90 minutes.
- Penalty shoot-out if scores still level.
- Twelve named substitutes.
- Maximum of five substitutions.
