= Esteban Paredes =

Chilean footballer (born 1980)

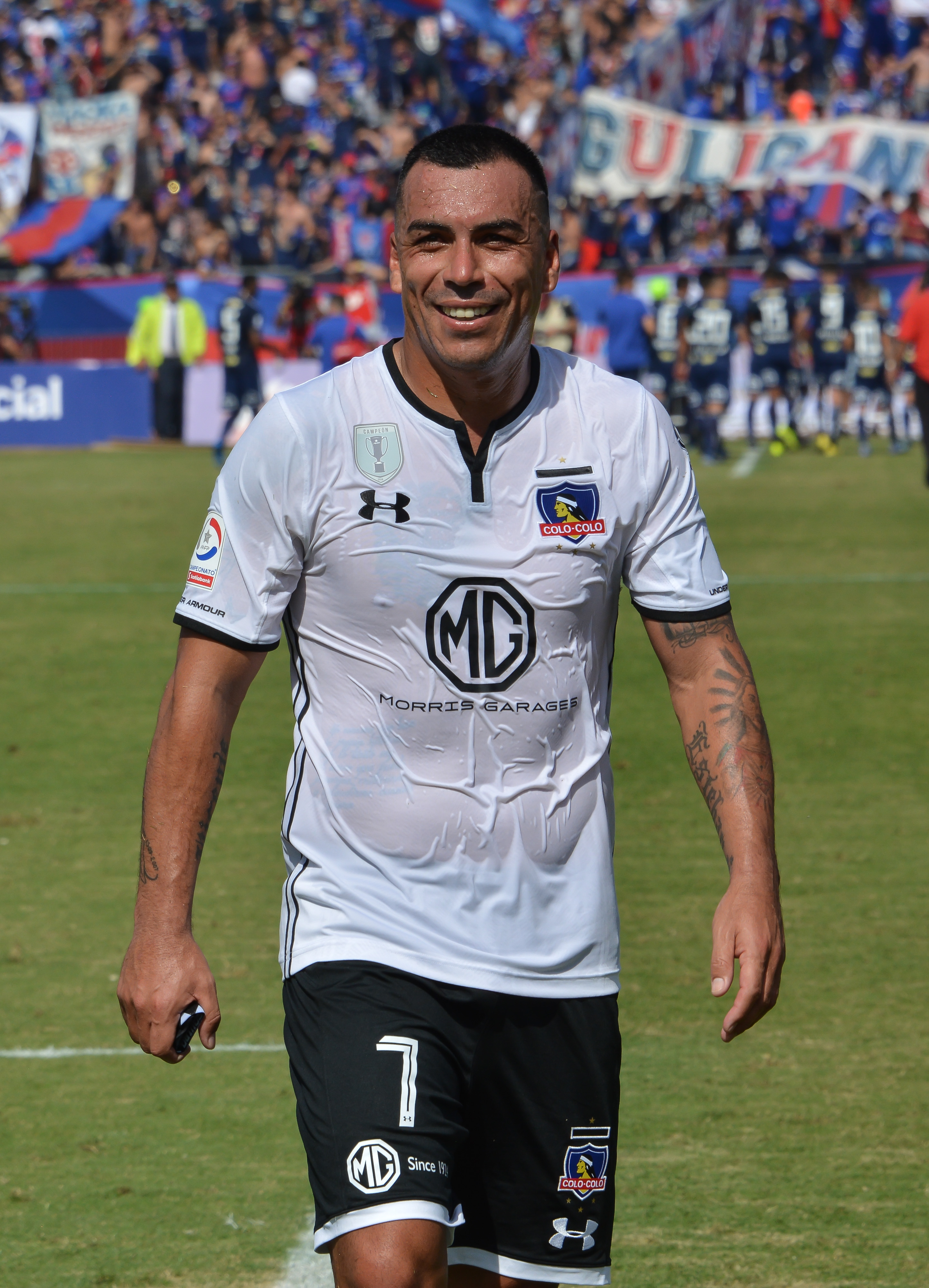
- Paredes with Colo-Colo in 2018

Personal information
- Full name: Esteban Efraín Paredes; Quintanilla
- Date of birth: 1 August 1980 (age 46)
- Place of birth: Santiago, Chile
- Height: 1.78 m (5 ft 10 in)
- Position: Forward

Youth career
- 1996–2000: Santiago Morning

Senior career*
Years	Team	Apps	(Gls)
2000–2009	Santiago Morning	169	(91)
2002	→ Deportes Puerto Montt (loan)	18	(9)
2004	→ Universidad de Concepción (loan)	14	(5)
2004	→ Pachuca Juniors (loan)	17	(5)
2007	→ Cobreloa (loan)	29	(10)
2009–2012	Colo-Colo	89	(50)
2012–2013	Atlante	29	(16)
2013	Querétaro	18	(6)
2014–2021	Colo-Colo	165	(103)
2021–2022	Coquimbo Unido	33	(7)
2023	San Antonio Unido	4	(0)
2024	Santiago Morning	7	(1)
Total		592	(303)

International career
2006–2018	Chile	42	(12)
2008	Chile U23	4	(2)

Managerial career
- 2024–2025: Santiago Morning (sporting director)
- 2026: Santiago Morning
- * Club domestic league appearances and goals

Esteban Efraín Paredes Quintanilla (born 1 August 1980) is a Chilean football manager and former footballer who played as a forward.

Paredes is the first player to be five-time Primera División de Chile top goalscorer and has scored 286 league goals in his career, highlighting his 217–Primera División de Chile goals record which allowed him to be the all-time top goalscorer of Chilean first-tier tournaments history. On 5 October 2019, he achieved the record surpassing Francisco Valdés in a 3–2 win over Universidad de Chile in the Chilean Superclásico.

== Club career ==
He began his career at Santiago Morning youth ranks and was promoted in 2000.

In 2009, he joined Chilean giants Colo-Colo on a three-year contract. That season, Paredes was an influential player and helped the team to win the Torneo Clausura. He was a key player in the final against Universidad Católica, scoring twice past Universidad Católica goalkeeper Paulo Garcés.

In May 2022, after playing for Coquimbo Unido in the Chilean Primera División, and having scored 367 goals in his career, Paredes announced his retirement as a professional footballer. However, in June 2023 he returned to the football activity by signing with San Antonio Unido in the Segunda División Profesional de Chile. Retired again, he returned to play for Santiago Morning in August 2024, announcing his definitive retirement at the end of the season.

== International career ==
Paredes represented his country in two World Cups, in 2010 and 2014 respectively, and at the 2011 Copa América.

=== International goals ===
Scores and results list Chile's goal tally first.

Goal	Date	Venue	Opponent	Score	Result	Competition
1.	12 August 2009	Brøndby Stadium, Brøndby, Denmark	Denmark	1–0	2–1	Friendly
2.	4 November 2009	CAP Stadium, Talcahuano, Chile	Paraguay	2–1	2–1	Friendly
3.	19 November 2009	Stadium Pod Dubňom, Žilina, Slovakia	Slovakia	2–1	2–1	Friendly
4.	20 January 2010	Estadio Francisco Sánchez Rumoroso, Coquimbo, Chile	Panama	1–0	2–1	Friendly
5.	20 January 2010	Estadio Francisco Sánchez Rumoroso, Coquimbo, Chile	Panama	2–0	2–1	Friendly
6.	30 May 2010	Estadio Nelson Oyarzún, Chillán, Chile	Northern Ireland	1–0	1–0	Friendly
7.	23 January 2011	The Home Depot Center, Los Angeles, United States	United States	1–0	1–1	Friendly
8.	4 July 2011	Estadio del Bicentenario, San Juan, Argentina	Mexico	1–1	2–1	2011 Copa América
9.	21 March 2012	Estadio Carlos Dittborn, Arica, Chile	Peru	1–0	3–1	Friendly
10.	26 March 2013	Estadio Nacional, Santiago, Chile	Uruguay	1–0	2–0	2014 World Cup qualifier
11.	29 March 2017	Estadio Monumental David Arellano, Santiago, Chile	Venezuela	2–0	3–1	2018 World Cup qualifier
12.	29 March 2017	Estadio Monumental David Arellano, Santiago, Chile	Venezuela	3–0	3–1	2018 World Cup qualifier

== Managerial career ==
In February 2024, Paredes assumed the role of sport manager of Santiago Morning, the club with which he began his playing career.

In December 2024, Paredes graduated as a football manager at INAF (National Institute of Football, Sports and Physical Activity of Chile).

In March 2026, Paredes was appointed as the manager of Santiago Morning in the Segunda División Profesional de Chile. He quit in November of the same year.

== Personal life ==
His son, Esteban Paredes Lastra, was with the Colo-Colo youth ranks and then moved to Palestino when his father left Colo-Colo.

In August 2022, he joined TNT Sports Chile as the co-host of the cooking and talk show Sabor a Gol (Flavour of Goal) alongside the chef Tomás Olivera.

He is currently the face of a sports betting app named Juega en Linea.

In October 2025, Paredes entered the dance TV show Fiebre de Baile (Dance Fever) from Chilevisión.

Paredes and the kinesiologist Wilson Ferrada founded Santiago United Academy, a football academy focused in American and Chilean players.

== Honours ==
Puerto Montt

- Primera B: 2002

Santiago Morning

- Primera B: 2005

Colo-Colo

- Primera División: 2009–C, 2014–C, 2015–A, 2017–T
- Copa Chile: 2016, 2019
- Supercopa de Chile: 2017, 2018

Coquimbo Unido

- Primera B: 2021

Individual

- Primera B de Chile Top Scorer: 2005
- Primera División de Chile Top Scorer (5): 2009–A, 2011–C, 2014–C, 2014–A, 2015–C
- El Gráfico Ideal Team (4): 2009, 2011, 2014, 2015
- ANFP Golden Ball Ideal Team (3): 2011, 2014, 2015
- ANFP Golden Ball Golden Boot: 2011
- Liga MX Golden Boot (Shared): 2012–A
- El Gráfico Golden Boot: 2014
- ANFP Golden Ball Best Player: 2015
- Copa Chile Top Scorer (2): 2015, 2016
- El Gráfico Best Copa Chile Player: 2016
