= Cristián Suárez =

Chilean footballer (born 1987)

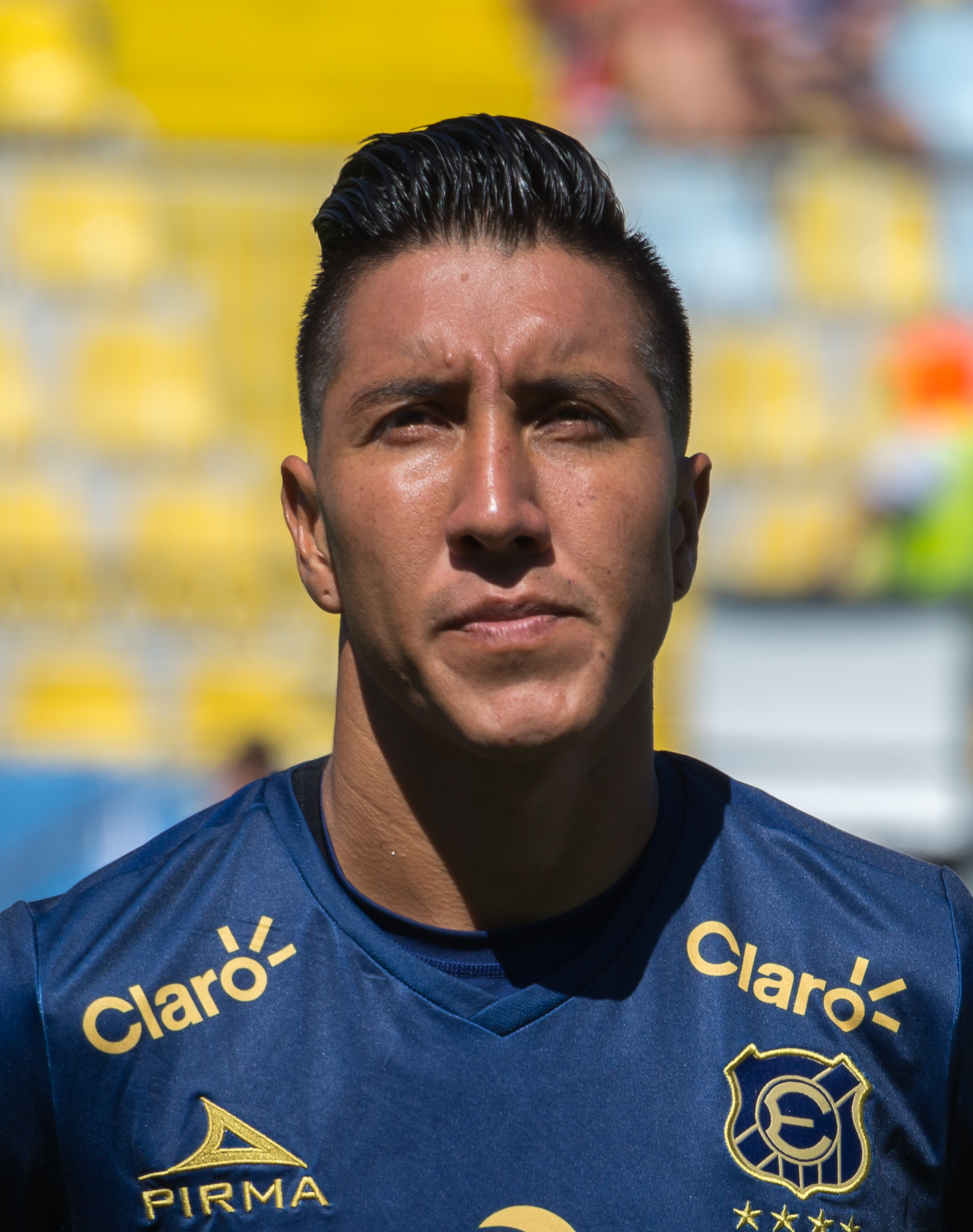
- Suárez with Everton in 2019

Personal information
- Full name: Cristián Fernando Suárez Figueroa
- Date of birth: February 6, 1987 (age 39)
- Place of birth: San Felipe, Chile
- Height: 1.79 m (5 ft 10 in)
- Position: Defender

Team information
- Current team: Unión San Felipe

Youth career
- 2003–2006: Unión San Felipe

Senior career*
Years	Team	Apps	(Gls)
2006–2011	Unión San Felipe	16	(0)
2008	→ Corinthians (loan)	0	(0)
2008–2009	→ Chacarita Juniors (loan)	0	(0)
2009–2010	→ O'Higgins (loan)	17	(0)
2011	→ Olhanense (loan)	7	(0)
2011–2015	Cobreloa	92	(5)
2014–2015	→ Universidad de Chile (loan)	0	(0)
2015–2017	Universidad de Chile	41	(4)
2016–2017	→ Everton (loan)	0	(0)
2017–2020	Everton	127	(4)
2021–2025	Palestino	135	(11)
2026	Deportes Concepción	10	(0)
2026–	Unión San Felipe	0	(0)

International career^{‡}
2007	Chile U20	16	(0)
- * Club domestic league appearances and goals as of 1 July 2026 ‡ National team caps and goals as of 13 May 2026

Cristián Fernando Suárez Figueroa (born February 6, 1987), is a Chilean football defender for Unión San Felipe.

== Club career ==
Born in San Felipe, before moving to Corinthians in December 2007, he played for Unión San Felipe. He played three official matches, and one friendly, against CENE, for Corinthians. Cristián Suárez joined Chacarita Juniors of Argentina on July 31, 2008.

Suárez spent five seasons with Palestino from 2021 to 2025.

On 22 December 2025, Suárez signed with Deportes Concepción. He ended his contract in June 2026 and returned to his training club, Unión San Felipe on 1 July.

== International career ==
Suárez played the 2007 South American Youth Championship, helping Chile qualify to the 2007 FIFA U-20 World Cup where he also participated, and was called up for a match between the Chile and Argentina senior national teams. He was also called up to the senior Chile squad for a friendly against the United States in January 2015.

== Honors ==
Universidad de Chile

- Primera División de Chile (1): 2014 Apertura
- Supercopa de Chile (1): 2015
- Copa Chile (1): 2015

Chile

- FIFA U-20 World Cup Third place: 2007

== Career statistics ==
As of match played 13 May 2026

Appearances and goals by club, season and competition
Club	Season	League			National Cup		Continental		Other		Total	
Club	Season	Division	Apps	Goals	Apps	Goals	Apps	Goals	Apps	Goals	Apps	Goals
Corinthians (loan)	2008	Série A	—		—		1	0	2 (Note: Two appearances in Campeonato Paulista)	0	3	0
Total			—		—		1	0	2	0	3	0
O'Higgins (loan)	2009	Liga de Primera	6	0	—		—		—		6	0
O'Higgins (loan)	2010	Liga de Primera	11	0	—		—		—		11	0
Total			17	0	—		—		—		17	0
Unión San Felipe	2010	Liga de Primera	16	0	—		4 (Note: Four appearances in Copa Sudamericana)	0	—		20	0
Olhanense (loan)	2010-11	Primeira Liga	7	0	—		—		—		7	0
Cobreloa	2011	Liga de Primera	17	0	—		—		—		17	0
Cobreloa	2012	Liga de Primera	31	2	1	1	4 (Note: Four appearances in Copa Sudamericana)	0	—		36	3
Cobreloa	2013	Liga de Primera	17	3	3	1	3 (Note: Three appearances in Copa Sudamericana)	0	—		23	4
Cobreloa	2013–14	Liga de Primera	27	0	—		—		—		27	0
Total			92	5	4	2	7	0	—		103	7
Universidad de Chile (loan)	2013–14	Primeira Liga	—		6	0	—		—		6	0
Cobreloa	2014–15	Liga de Primera	—		2	0	—		—		2	0
Universidad de Chile	2014–15	Liga de Primera	24	1	—		3 (Note: Three appearances in Copa Libertadores)	0	1 (Note: Four appearances in Supercopa de Chile)	1	28	2
Universidad de Chile	2015–16	Liga de Primera	17	3	—		2 (Note: Two appearances in Copa Libertadores)	0	—		19	3
Total			41	4	—		5	0	1	1	47	5
Everton (loan)	2015–16	Liga de Primera	—		8	1	—		—		8	1
Everton	2016–17	Liga de Primera	28	2	1	0	2 (Note: Two appearances in Copa sudamericana)	0	—		31	2
Everton	2018	Liga de Primera	43	2	1	0	2 (Note: Two appearances in Copa sudamericana)	0	—		46	2
Everton	2019	Liga de Primera	24	0	6	0	—		—		30	0
Everton	2020	Liga de Primera	32	0	—		—		—		32	0
Total			127	4	16	1	4	0	—		147	5
Palestino	2021	Liga de Primera	32	3	6	1	8 (Note: Eight appearances in Copa sudamericana)	0	—		46	4
Palestino	2022	Liga de Primera	28	1	2	0	—		—		30	1
Palestino	2023	Liga de Primera	23	1	3	0	7 (Note: Seven appearances in Copa sudamericana)	0	—		33	1
Palestino	2024	Liga de Primera	27	5	3	0	10 (Note: Ten appearances in Copa Libertadores)	1	—		44	6
Palestino	2025	Liga de Primera	25	1	4	0	6 (Note: Six appearances in Copa Sudamericana)	1	—		35	2
Total			135	11	18	1	31	2	—		188	14
Deportes Concepción	2026	Liga de Primera	7	0	3	0	—		—		10	0
Career total			442	24	49	5	52	2	3	1	550	31
