= Pablo Guede =

Argentine footballer and manager

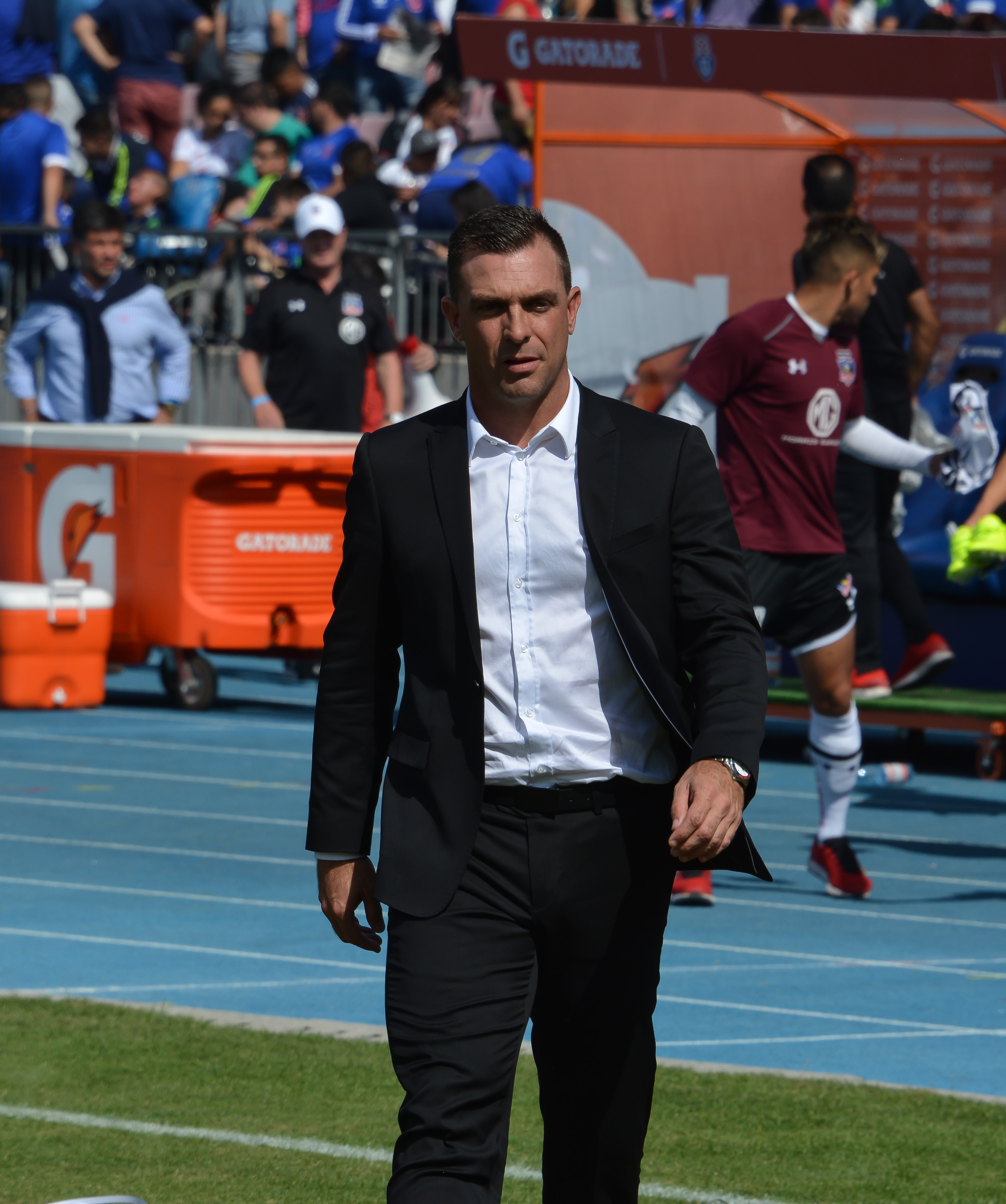
- Guede in 2018

Personal information
- Full name: Pablo Adrián Guede Barrirero
- Date of birth: 12 November 1974 (age 51)
- Place of birth: Buenos Aires, Argentina
- Height: 1.78 m (5 ft 10 in)
- Position: Forward

Team information
- Current team: Alianza Lima (manager)

Senior career*
Years	Team	Apps	(Gls)
1993–1995	Deportivo Español		
1995–1996	Nueva Chicago	35	(15)
1996–1997	Deportivo Español	32	(2)
1997	Xerez	5	(0)
1997–1999	Málaga	39	(6)
1999–2001	Elche	17	(1)
2001–2002	Poli Ejido	30	(4)
2002	Motril	11	(1)
2002–2003	Jaén	29	(10)
2003–2006	Melilla	99	(26)
2007–2008	Atlético Juval		
Total		297	(65)

Managerial career
- 2008–2010: Atlético Juval (youth)
- 2010–2011: Atlético Juval
- 2011–2012: El Palo
- 2013–2014: Nueva Chicago
- 2014–2015: Palestino
- 2015–2016: San Lorenzo
- 2016–2018: Colo-Colo
- 2018–2019: Al-Ahli
- 2019–2020: Morelia
- 2020–2021: Tijuana
- 2021–2022: Necaxa
- 2022: Málaga
- 2023–2024: Argentinos Juniors
- 2025: Puebla
- 2026–: Alianza Lima
- * Club domestic league appearances and goals

Pablo Adrián Guede Barrirero (born 12 November 1974) is an Argentine professional football manager and former player who played as a forward. He is the current manager of Peruvian club Alianza Lima.

== Playing career ==
Born in Buenos Aires, Guede represented local sides Deportivo Español and Nueva Chicago before moving to Spain in 1997, with Segunda División side Xerez CD. In November of that year, however, he left the club and moved to Málaga CF in Segunda División B, helping in their promotion at the end of the season.

In 1999, after achieving another promotion with Málaga, Guede signed for Elche CF in the second division. Rarely used, he moved to third level's Polideportivo Ejido in January 2001, and also achieved promotion with the side.

In January 2002, Guede joined Motril CF in division three, and subsequently resumed his career in the category, representing Real Jaén and UD Melilla. He retired from professional football with the latter in 2006, aged 31.

== Managerial career ==
=== Early career ===
In 2006, after ending his playing spell at Melilla, Guede became the technical secretary of the very same club. He left in 2008 to become a youth manager at lowly Atlético Juval, and was also the manager of the main squad during the 2010–11 season when it returned to an active status.

On 26 January 2011, Guede was named manager of Tercera División club CD El Palo. He left the club for personal reasons in February 2013, being replaced by his assistant Daniel Pérez Vivar; the club achieved promotion at the end of the campaign.

In November 2013, Guede signed as coach for Nueva Chicago of the Primera B Metropolitana, returning thereby his homeland Argentina following seventeen years outside. He resigned in May 2014, after leading the side back to the Primera B Nacional.

=== Palestino ===
In mid-2014, Guede moved to Primera División de Chile side Palestino. After finishing fourth in the league table and also qualified to the liguilla for enter the 2015 Copa Libertadores, he reached the team's qualification to continental contest after beat 6–1 to Santiago Wanderers at Valparaíso which broke a 37-year absence from the team at the Conmebol tournament.

At the Libertadores he reached an historical qualification to the group stage over Nacional, but once there the club failed to advance the knockout stage after finishing third behind Boca Juniors and Montevideo Wanderers F.C. from Uruguay too. On 13 November 2015, after long negotiations, it was confirmed that Guede would leave Palestino in order to undertake the coaching of the prestigious Argentine club San Lorenzo de Almagro the following season.

=== San Lorenzo ===
San Lorenzo officially named Guede as manager on 5 January 2016. He won the 2015 Supercopa Argentina with the side before resigning on 15 June.

=== Colo-Colo ===
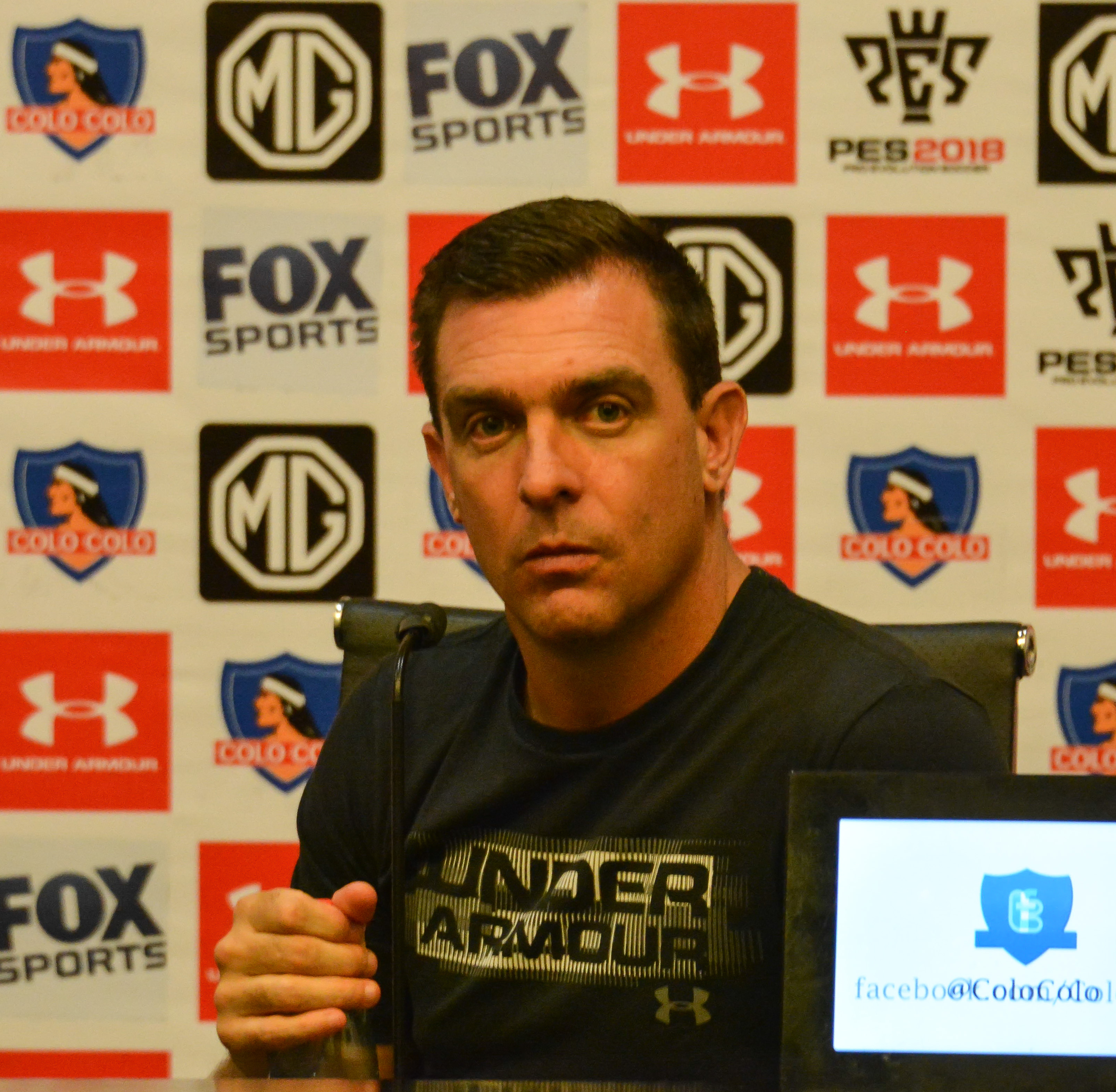
Guede during a press conference in 2018

On 15 July 2016, Guede returned to Chile after being appointed manager of Colo-Colo. He was presented at his new club three days later.

Guede led the side to the 2016 Copa Chile title in his first season, while also winning the 2017 Transición tournament and two Supercopa de Chile accolades in 2017 and 2018. On 19 April 2018, he resigned.

=== Al-Ahli ===
On 15 May 2018, Guede moved overseas and was named in charge of Saudi club Al-Ahli for two years. He was sacked the following 4 February, with the side in the fourth place in the league.

=== Monarcas Morelia ===
On 22 August 2019, Guede switched teams and countries again after being named manager of Liga MX side Monarcas Morelia. He left the club the following 24 May, amidst the COVID-19 pandemic.

=== Tijuana ===
On 19 June 2020, Guede took over Tijuana also in the Mexican first division. He resigned on 12 April of the following year, after a poor run of results.

=== Necaxa ===
On 27 September 2021, Guede was appointed manager of Necaxa. The following 8 February, he was sacked after winning only three points out of 12 in the league and being in charge for ten matches.

=== Málaga ===
On 2 April 2022, Guede replaced sacked Natxo González at the helm of former side Málaga. He was himself dismissed on 20 September, after a poor start of the new season.

=== Puebla ===
On 2 December 2024, Club Puebla hired Guede to be their new manager. During his tenure, Puebla played 24 matches under his leadership, with three wins, three draws, and 17 losses during this period.

Guede was relieved of duties on 16 August 2025, after a home loss to Atlético de San Luis in a match that was controversial due to a prematch shooting nearby. His management record included a particularly heavy loss to Tigres UANL (7–0) just days before his sacking and a poor showing in the 2025 Liga MX Apertura, where Puebla finished 15th in the standings.

=== Alianza Lima ===
On 12 December 2025, Guede was confirmed as manager of Alianza Lima in Peru for the upcoming season.

== Managerial statistics ==
As of match played 17 October 2026

Managerial record by team and tenure
Team	Nat	From	To	Record					Ref.
Team	Nat	From	To	G	W	D	L	Win %	Ref.
El Palo	(Spain)	26 January 2011	10 December 2012	72	28	19	25	38.89	
Nueva Chicago	(Argentina)	18 November 2013	26 May 2014	24	15	4	5	62.50	
Palestino	(Chile)	2 June 2014	22 December 2015	79	39	12	28	49.37	
San Lorenzo	(Argentina)	23 December 2015	15 June 2016	24	11	8	5	45.83	
Colo-Colo	(Chile)	18 July 2016	18 April 2018	72	38	16	18	52.78	
Al-Ahli	(Saudi Arabia)	15 May 2018	5 February 2019	25	15	5	5	60.00	
Morelia	(Mexico)	20 August 2019	24 May 2020	33	16	7	10	48.48	
Tijuana	(Mexico)	19 June 2020	12 April 2021	32	8	7	17	25.00	
Necaxa	(Mexico)	27 September 2021	7 February 2022	11	4	2	5	36.36	
Málaga	(Spain)	2 April 2022	20 September 2022	14	3	2	9	21.43	
Argentinos Juniors	(Argentina)	9 September 2023	20 August 2024	47	18	13	16	38.30	
Puebla	(Mexico)	2 December 2024	15 August 2025	25	5	3	17	20.00	
Alianza Lima	(Peru)	12 December 2025	present	34	18	10	6	52.94	
Career Total				492	218	108	166	44.31	—

== Honours ==
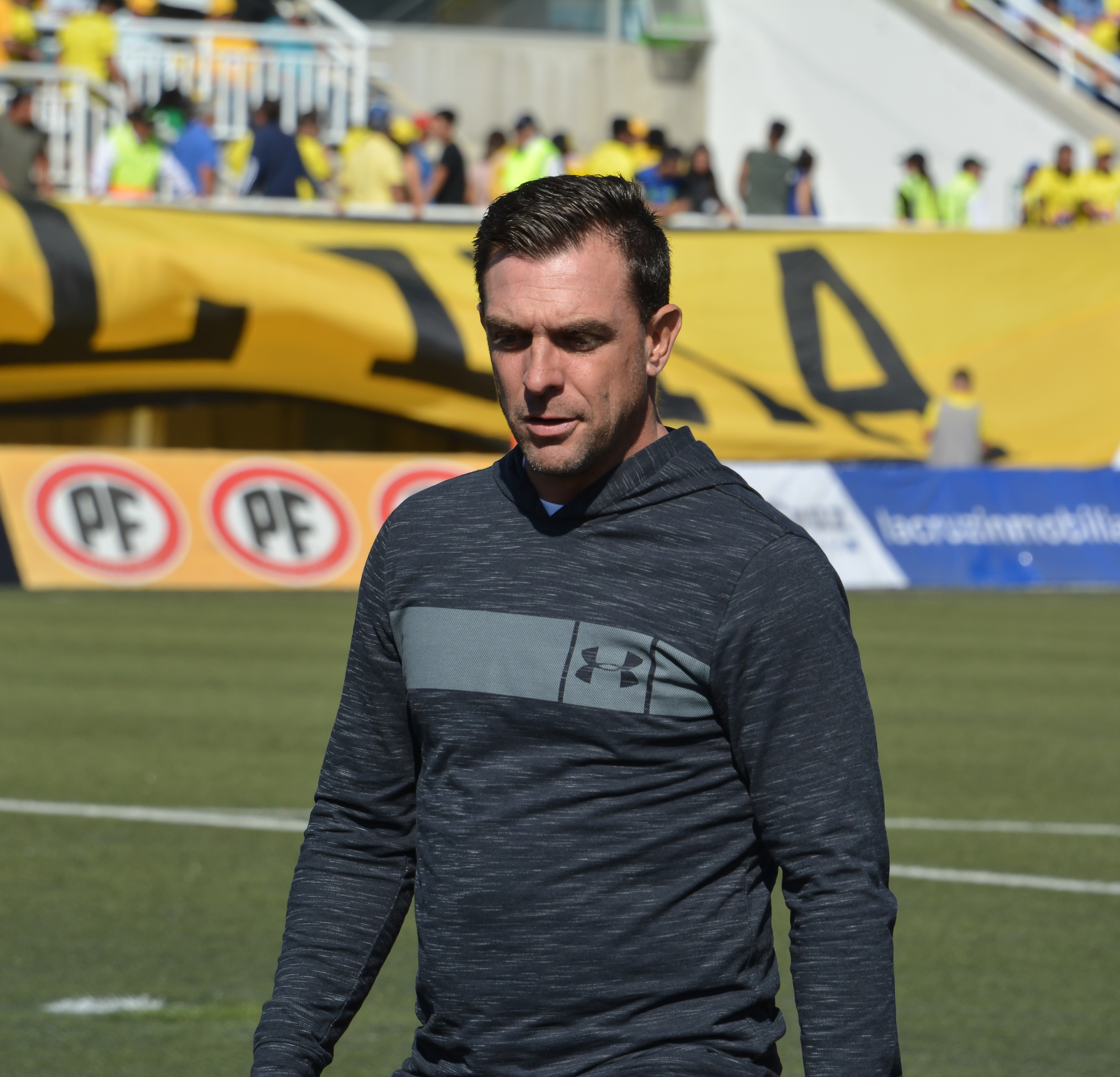
Guede in 2018

=== Player ===
Málaga

- Segunda División: 1998–99

=== Manager ===
Nueva Chicago

- Primera B Metropolitana: 2013–14

San Lorenzo

- Supercopa Argentina: 2015

Colo-Colo

- Copa Chile: 2016
- Chilean Primera División: 2017–T
- Supercopa de Chile: 2017, 2018
