= Football Federation of Chile =

Governing body of association football in Chile

CONMEBOL
- Founded: 19 June 1895; 131 years ago
- Headquarters: Santiago, Chile
- FIFA affiliation: 1913 (revoking membership in 1925)
- CONMEBOL affiliation: 1916
- President: Pablo Milad Abusleme
- Website: laroja.cl

The Football Federation of Chile (Spanish: Federación de Fútbol de Chile or FFCh) is the governing body of football in Chile. It was founded on 19 June 1895, making it the second-oldest South American association football federation, and is a founding member of CONMEBOL since 1916. It supervises the Chile national football team, Chile women's national football team, Asociación Nacional de Fútbol Profesional: (National Association of Professional Football, originally called Asociación Central de Fútbol (Central Football Association), or ACF, and Asociación Nacional de Fútbol Amateur (National Association of Amateur Football).

== Affiliation and organization ==
The Federación is affiliated to FIFA, CONMEBOL and the Olympic Committee of Chile. In turn, it is the body that governs both the professional and amateur football in Chile.

The Football Federation of Chile is responsible for overseeing the Asociación Nacional de Fútbol Profesional (ANFP) and Asociación Nacional de Fútbol Amateur (ANFA). These two associations are managed by the Instituto Nacional del Fútbol (National Institute of Football, also known as INAF) created in 1996 for the training of referees, football coach, engineering of the implementation of business administration, sports organizations, technical operation and the maintenance of sports venues and recreation.

=== Association staff ===
Name	Position	Source
(Chile) Pablo Milad	President	
(Chile) Justo Alvarez	Vice-president	
(Chile) Jorge Yunge	General secretary	
(Chile) Elias Vistoso	Treasurer	
n/a	Technical director	
(Chile) Nicolás Córdova	Team coach (men's)	
(Chile) Luis Mena	Team coach (women's)	
(Chile) Gianfranco Dazzarolla	Media/communications manager	
(Chile) Luis Alberto Ramírez	Futsal Coordinator	
(Chile) Christian Schiemann	Referee coordinator	
(Chile) Roberto Tobar	Chairperson of the Referees Committee	
(Chile) Carlos Ullora	Head/Director of the Referees Department	

== History ==
The Football Association of Chile (FAC) was founded, after a meeting in Valparaíso on 19 June 1895, and is headed by journalist David Scott. This organization was a pioneer in terms of football organization in Chile, but with a very limited scope. It came into conflict with the Federación Sportiva Nacional, the national institution created in 1909 to protect the sports in the country.

Having Hispanicised its name to Asociación de Football de Chile, FAC achieved affiliation to FIFA provisionally in 1913 and fully in 1914. In 1916, during the competition of the first Copa América, CONMEBOL was founded with Chile as one of the founding members, besides the Confederação Brasileira de Desportos (CBD), Asociación Argentina de Football (AAF) and Asociación Uruguaya de Fútbol (AUF).

In 1917, the disputes with the Federación Sportiva Nacional were resolved. But in the early twenties, there appeared the Federación de Football de Chile located in Santiago, which, in October 1923, took the continental football national representation, before the retreat of the Asociación de Football de Chile from the CONMEBOL in order to form a parallel confederation. Faced with this situation, FIFA removed Chile in 1925.

This vital removal forced quick solutions, and on 24 January 1926, the Federación de Football de Chile merged with the Asociación de Football de Chile, thus creating a single entity which rose to be the sole governing body of Chilean football. After the unification, the newly formed organization retained the name of "Federación de Football de Chile" and based in Valparaíso. It was recognized by CONMEBOL in April and, on a temporary basis, by FIFA in July.

The Federación de Fútbol de Chile registered its 1954 candidacy for hosting the 1962 World Cup. On 10 June 1956, as part of FIFA's Executive Congress in Lisbon, Portugal, Chile was elected with 32 votes in favour to be the host of FIFA World Cup 1962, while Argentina received 10 votes and 14 members voted blank.

On 15 August 2006, the Federación de Fútbol de Chile presented its candidacy to the Executive Committee of FIFA to host the FIFA U-20 Women's World Cup, 2008, the fourth edition of the tournament. The committee resolved on 15 September 2006 granting the organising right to the Chilean Federation and it will be the first FIFA Women's World Cup, of any category, to be held in South America.
