= Fabián Hormazábal =

Chilean footballer (born 1996)

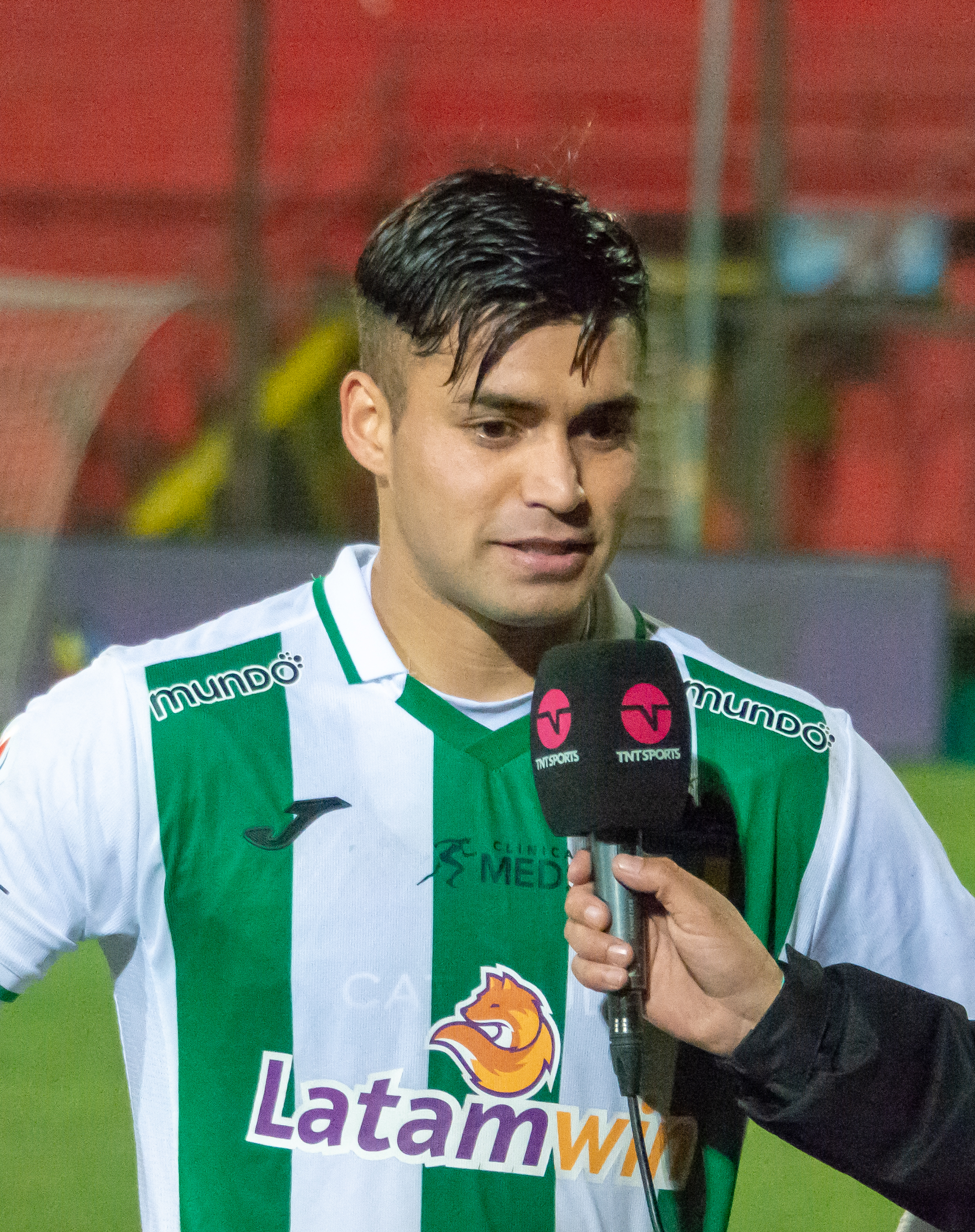
- Hormazábal with O'Higgins in 2023

Personal information
- Full name: Fabián Marcelo Hormazábal Berríos
- Date of birth: 26 April 1996 (age 30)
- Place of birth: Machalí, Chile
- Height: 1.76 m (5 ft 9 in)
- Position: Winger

Team information
- Current team: Universidad de Chile
- Number: 17

Youth career
- O'Higgins

Senior career*
Years	Team	Apps	(Gls)
2014–2023	O'Higgins	104	(3)
2016–2017	→ Curicó Unido (loan)	22	(3)
2019–2021	→ Deportes La Serena (loan)	49	(6)
2024–	Universidad de Chile	76	(7)

International career^{‡}
2024–	Chile	10	(0)
- * Club domestic league appearances and goals as of 9 June 2026 ‡ National team caps and goals as of 9 June 2026

Fabián Marcelo Hormazábal Berríos (born 26 April 1996) is a Chilean footballer who currently plays as a winger for Liga de Primera club Universidad de Chile and the Chile national team.

== Club career ==
=== Youth career ===
Hormazábal started his career at Primera División de Chile club O'Higgins. He progressed from the under categories club all the way to the senior team.

=== O'Higgins ===
For the 2014–15 season, Hormazábal was promoted for the first team squad of the club. He played 3 matches for 2014–15 Copa Chile and scored a goal against Santiago Wanderers.

=== Universidad de Chile ===
For the 2024 season, he signed with Universidad de Chile.

== International career ==
Hormazábal received his first call-up to the Chile national team for the 2026 FIFA World Cup qualification matches against Brazil and Colombia in October 2024.

He made his debut on 19 November 2024 in a World Cup qualifier against Venezuela at the Estadio Nacional Julio Martínez Prádanos. He played the full game, as Chile won 4–2.

== Career statistics ==
=== International ===
As of match played 9 June 2026.

Appearances and goals by national team and year
National team	Year	Apps	Goals
Chile	2024	1	0
Chile	2025	7	0
Chile	2026	2	0
Total		10	0

== Honours ==
O'Higgins

- Supercopa de Chile: 2014

Curicó Unido

- Primera B: 2016–17

Universidad de Chile

- Copa Chile: 2024
- Supercopa de Chile: 2025

Individual

- Chilean Primera División Ideal Team (2): 2024, 2025
