= Miguel Jiménez =

Miguel Jiménez may refer to:

- Miguel Ángel Jiménez (born 1964), Spanish golfer
- Miguel Jimenez (baseball) (born 1969), Major League Baseball pitcher
- Miguel Jiménez (boxer) (born 1970), boxer from Puerto Rico
- Miguel Jiménez (Chilean footballer) (born 1980), Chilean football goalkeeper
- Miguel Jiménez (Mexican footballer) (born 1990), Mexican football goalkeeper
