= Ignacio Tapia =

Ignacio Tapia is the name of:

- Ignacio Tapia (footballer, born 1999), Chilean footballer
- Ignacio Tapia (footballer, born 2004), Argentine footballer
