= Óscar Opazo =

Chilean footballer (born 1990)

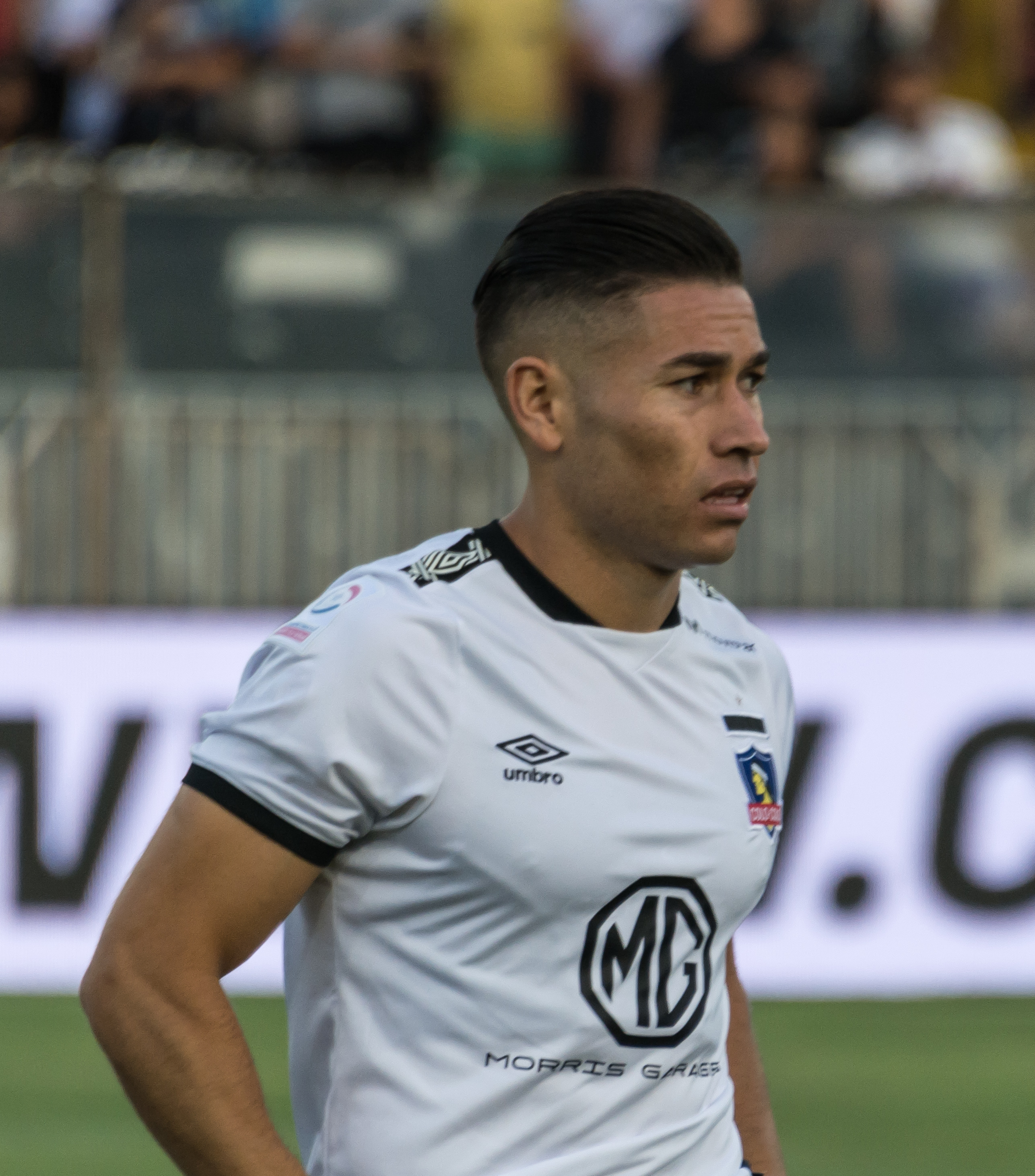
- Opazo with Colo-Colo in 2020

Personal information
- Full name: Óscar Mauricio Opazo Lara
- Date of birth: 18 October 1990 (age 36)
- Place of birth: Concón, Chile
- Height: 1.68 m (5 ft 6 in)
- Position: Full-back

Team information
- Current team: Everton

Youth career
- Concón Bajo
- San Carlos Concón
- 2001–2009: Santiago Wanderers

Senior career*
Years	Team	Apps	(Gls)
2008–2017	Santiago Wanderers	180	(3)
2017–2022	Colo-Colo	120	(5)
2023	Racing Club	7	(0)
2023–2025	Colo-Colo	43	(3)
2026–	Everton	0	(0)

International career^{‡}
2017–	Chile	13	(1)
- * Club domestic league appearances and goals as of 10 December 2025 ‡ National team caps and goals as of 15 October 2019

Óscar Mauricio Opazo Lara (Latin American Spanish: [ˈoskaɾ oˈpaso]; born 18 October 1990) is a Chilean footballer who plays as a full-back for Everton de Viña del Mar.

== Club career ==
In December 2022, Opazo joined Argentine Primera División side Racing Club for the 2023 season. He returned to Colo-Colo in the second half of 2023 until December 2025.

On 18 February 2026, Opazo joined Everton, the classic rival of his training club, Santiago Wanderers.

== International career ==
Opazo got his first call up to the senior Chile side for 2018 FIFA World Cup qualifiers against Ecuador and Peru in October 2016.

== Personal life ==
Opazo is nicknamed Torta (Cake).

== Career statistics ==
=== International ===
Scores and results list Chile's goal tally first.

No.	Date	Venue	Opponent	Score	Result	Competition
1.	26 March 2019	BBVA Compass Stadium, Houston, United States	United States	1–1	1–1	Friendly

== Honours ==
=== Club ===
Colo-Colo

- Primera División (1): Transición 2017
- Supercopa de Chile (2): 2017, 2018

=== International ===
Chile

- China Cup: 2017
