= Nicolás Berardo =

Argentine-born Chilean footballer

Personal information
- Full name: Nicolás Berardo
- Date of birth: July 26, 1990 (age 36)
- Place of birth: San Basilio, Córdoba, Argentina
- Height: 1.82 m (6 ft 0 in)
- Position: Left back

Team information
- Current team: Deportes Antofagasta

Youth career
- Argentinos Juniors

Senior career*
| Years | Team | Apps | (Gls) |
| 2009–2013 | Argentinos Juniors | 40 | (0) |
| 2012–2013 | → Unión Española (loan) | 32 | (3) |
| 2013–2017 | Unión Española | 90 | (6) |
| 2017–2021 | Coquimbo Unido | 38 | (2) |
| 2021 | Palestino | 16 | (1) |
| 2022 | Coquimbo Unido | 18 | (1) |
| 2023 | Magallanes | 22 | (2) |
| 2024– | Deportes Antofagasta | 0 | (0) |
- * Club domestic league appearances and goals as of 15 January 2024

Nicolás Berardo (born July 26, 1990) is an Argentine naturalized Chilean footballer who currently plays as a left back for Primera B de Chile club Deportes Antofagasta.

== Career ==
In 2013, he was champion with Unión Española after achieved the Torneo Transición.

On August 3, 2017, he moved to Coquimbo Unido from the Primera B de Chile. After Coquimbo Unido was relegated to Primera B, he joined Palestino.

In 2024, he joined Deportes Antofagasta from Magallanes.

== Honours ==
Argentinos Juniors

- Argentine Primera División (1): 2010–C

Unión Española

- Chilean Primera División (1): 2013–T
- Supercopa de Chile (1): 2013

Coquimbo Unido

- Primera B de Chile (1): 2018
