= Asociación Nacional de Fútbol Amateur =

Chilean Football Federation
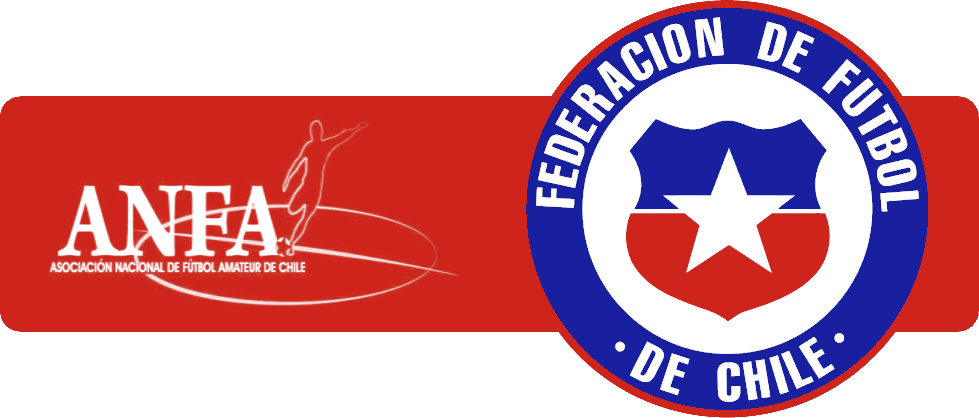
- Founded: 23 June 1985; 40 years ago
- Headquarters: Santiago, Chile
- President: Justo Alvarez
- Website: anfa.cl

The Asociación Nacional de Fútbol Amateur (National Association of Amateur Football), locally known by its abbreviation ANFA, is the governing body of Chilean football on amateur level, and along with Asociación Nacional de Fútbol Profesional (ANFP), who is responsible for the professional counterpart, they made the Chilean Football Federation.

Its functions are to organize and promote the amateur football in Chile.

It is responsible for organizing the Chilean Tercera División A, the fourth level competition in Chilean football, and the Chilean Tercera División B, the fifth level competition, as well as the 345 Local Associations, located in 15 different Regional Associations. They also organize the Campeonato Nacional Amateur de Clubes Campeones, and the Campeonato Nacional Amateur de Asociaciones (at Adult and Youth levels).

== Campeonato Nacional Amateur de Clubes Campeones ANFA ==
=== Winners ===
- 1988 - Arturo Prat (Hualañé, Maule)
- 1989 - Unión Bellavista (Antofagasta, Antofagasta)
- 1990 - Independiente (Cauquenes, Maule)
- 1991 - C.C.U. (Antofagasta, Antofagasta)
- 1992 - Lintz (Puerto Montt, Los Lagos)
- 1993 - Coloso (Arica, Tarapacá)
- 1994 - Unión Pacífico (Constitución, Maule)
- 1995 - Santos (Temuco, Araucanía)
- 1996 - Julio Juárez (El Pinar, Santiago)
- 1997 - Estrella del Sur (Castro, Los Lagos)
- 1998 - Cardenal Caro (Pichilemu, O'Higgins)
- 1999 - Unión Católica (Nogales, Valparaíso)
- 2000 - Arauco (Osorno, Los Lagos)
- 2001 - Cardenal Caro (Pichilemu, O'Higgins)
- 2002 - Población Balmaceda (José María Caro, Santiago)
- 2003 - Huracán (Concepción, Biobío)
- 2004 - Unión Compañía (Unión Esperanza, O'Higgins)
- 2005 - Unión Wanderers (General Lagos, Los Ríos)
- 2006 - IRFE (Santa Cruz, O'Higgins)
- 2007 - Estrella (Graneros, O'Higgins)
- 2008 - Lord Cochrane (Concepción, Biobío)
- 2009 - Estrella (Graneros, O'Higgins)
- 2010 - Paniahue (Santa Cruz, O'Higgins)
- 2011 - Paniahue (Santa Cruz, O'Higgins)
- 2012 - Juventud Varsovia (Cardenal Caro, Santiago)
- 2013 - Deportivo Escondida (Antofagasta, Antofagasta)
- 2014 - Atlético Balmaceda (San Antonio, Valparaíso)
- 2015 - Paniahue (Santa Cruz, O'Higgins)
- 2016 - Juventud Unida (Dalcahue, Los Lagos)
- 2017 - Unión Bellavista (Coquimbo, Coquimbo)
- 2018 - Población Los Nogales (Estación Central, Santiago)
- 2019 - Unión Bellavista (Coquimbo, Coquimbo)
- 2020 - Cóndor (Pichidegua, O'Higgins)
- 2023 - La Higuera (La Ligua, Valparaíso)
- 2024 - Marcos Trincado (Rengo, O'Higgins)
- 2025 - Colo-Colo (Villarrica, Araucanía)

== Campeonato Nacional Amateur de Asociaciones ANFA ==
=== Winners ===
- 1912 - Antofagasta
- 1913 - Antofagasta / Santiago
- 1914 - Santiago
- 1915 - Talcahuano / Santiago
- 1916 - Talcahuano / Valparaíso
- 1917 - Zona Sur / Zona Central
- 1920 - Zona Sur
- 1924 - Zona Sur / Zona Central
- 1926 - Zona Norte
- 1927 - IV Zona (Aconcagua Valparaíso)
- 1928 - VI Zona (Colchagua Maule)
- 1930 - Iquique / Concepción
- 1931 - Santiago
- 1934 - Lota
- 1935 - San Enrique (Iquique)
- 1937 - Iquique
- 1938 - Valparaíso
- 1939 - Pedro de Valdivia
- 1941 - Pedro de Valdivia
- 1943 - Iquique
- 1945 - Concepción
- 1947 - Iquique
- 1949 - La Serena
- 1951 - La Serena
- 1953 - La Serena
- 1955 - Iquique
- 1957 - Peñaflor
- 1959 - Calama
- 1961 - Chuquicamata
- 1963 - Peñaflor
- 1966 - Alejo Barrios (Valparaíso)
- 1968 - Valparaíso
- 1970 - Antofagasta
- 1972 - Antofagasta
- 1974 - Castro
- 1976 - Peñaflor
- 1978 - Iquique
- 1980 - Punta Arenas
- 1982 - Puerto Montt
- 1984 - Pichilemu
- 1989 - Rengo
- 1993 - Quilpué
- 1996 - Rengo
- 2000 - Illapel
- 2003 - Castro
- 2005 - Santa Cruz
- 2008 - Punta Arenas
- 2011 - Cardenal Caro (Santiago)
- 2014 - Villa San Agustín (Talca)
- 2017 - Castro
- 2020 - Tocopilla
- 2024 - Peumo
