= 2005 Campeonato Nacional Primera B =

The 2005 Primera B de Chile was second tier’s 55th season. Santiago Morning was the tournament’s champion, winning its third title.

== Qualification ==
=== Group stage ===
==== North Group ====
Pos	Team	Pld	W	D	L	GF	GA	GD	Pts
1	Deportes Antofagasta	6	3	1	2	6	4	+2	10
2	Deportes Arica	6	1	5	0	9	8	+1	8
3	Deportes Ovalle	6	2	2	2	10	10	0	8
4	Deportes Copiapó	6	1	2	3	6	9	−3	5

==== Centre Group ====
Pos	Team	Pld	W	D	L	GF	GA	GD	Pts
1	Santiago Morning	8	6	1	1	18	9	+9	19
2	O'Higgins	8	5	2	1	13	20	−7	17
3	Magallanes	8	1	4	3	11	12	−1	7
4	Unión La Calera	8	0	5	3	7	11	−4	5
5	San Luis Quillota	8	1	2	5	9	16	−7	5

==== South Group ====
Pos	Team	Pld	W	D	L	GF	GA	GD	Pts
1	Provincial Osorno	8	6	0	2	13	12	+1	18
2	Naval	8	5	0	3	20	12	+8	15
3	Lota Schwager	8	3	1	4	14	17	−3	10
4	Ñublense	8	2	3	3	15	13	+2	9
5	Arturo Fernández Vial	8	1	2	5	6	14	−8	5

=== Accumulated table ===
Pos	Team	Pld	W	D	L	GF	GA	GD	BP	Pts	Promotion or qualification
1	Santiago Morning	26	16	4	6	60	34	+26	10	62	Promotion to Primera División de Chile
2	Deportes Antofagasta	26	15	6	5	43	20	+23	7	58	Promotion to Primera División de Chile
3	Provincial Osorno	26	11	10	5	55	39	+16	9	52	To Promotion Playoffs
4	Ñublense	26	13	5	8	53	44	+9	5	49	
5	O'Higgins	26	9	8	9	41	35	+6	9	44	To Promotion Playoffs
6	Deportes Arica	26	11	5	10	42	39	+3	5	43	
7	Deportes Ovalle	26	11	7	8	44	43	+1	1	41 (Note: 5 bonus points with 4 deducted for using an ineligible player)	
8	Lota Schwager	26	11	2	13	46	53	−7	5	40	
9	San Luis Quillota	26	9	9	8	42	47	−5	3	39	
10	Magallanes	26	9	5	12	42	46	−4	4	36	
11	Unión La Calera	26	10	2	14	41	47	−6	3	35	
12	Arturo Fernández Vial	26	8	5	13	34	57	−23	3	32	
13	Deportes Copiapó	26	3	7	16	26	51	−25	0	16 (Note: 3 bonus points with 3 deducted for using an ineligible player)	
14	Naval	26	5	7	14	43	53	−10	−15	7 (Note: 8 bonus points with 23 deducted for using an ineligible player, fielding the youth team, and failing to pay players on time.)	

Rules for classification: Teams were awarded half the first phase points as a bonus, and the North group teams obtained two thirds to account for the fewer matches played.
Notes:

Primera B de Chile
2005 champion
Santiago Morning
3rd title

== Relegation table ==
Pos	Team	Pond
1	Santiago Morning	50.000
2	O'Higgins	47.333
3	Provincial Osorno	46.666
4	Deportes Antofagasta	45.444
5	Unión La Calera	41.778
6	Magallanes	38.111
7	Arturo Fernández Vial	32.666
8	Deportes Copiapó	31.667
9	Lota Schwager	29.333
10	Deportes Ovalle	29.166
11	Naval	29.000
12	Deportes Arica	27.111

== Topscorer ==
Name	Team	Goals
(Chile) Esteban Paredes	Santiago Morning	25
