= 2015 Copa Chile =

Copa Chile MTS

Tournament details
- Country: Chile
- Teams: 32

Final positions
- Champions: Universidad de Chile
- Runners-up: Colo-Colo

Tournament statistics
- Matches played: 125
- Goals scored: 292 (2.34 per match)
- Top goal scorer(s): Felipe Mora; Esteban Paredes (7 goals each)

The 2015 Copa Chile, (officially known as Copa Chile MTS 2015 because of its sponsorship), was the 36th edition of the Copa Chile, the country's national cup tournament. The competition started on July 8, 2015, with the First Round and concluded on December 2, 2015, with the Final. The winner qualifies for the 2016 Copa Libertadores and the 2016 Supercopa de Chile. The Runner-up qualifies for the 2016 Copa Sudamericana.

== Schedule ==
Round	Date
First Round	July 8, 2015; August 2, 2015
Second Round	September 2–9, 2015
Quarterfinals	October 6–22, 2015
Semifinals	November 4–25, 2015
Final	December 2, 2015

== Teams ==
A total 32 clubs were accepted for the competition. For this edition the teams are from the Primera División and Primera B, only.

== First round ==
On this round every team plays home and away against every other team in its group. The best 2 teams from each group advance to the next round.

=== Group 1 ===
Team	Pld	W	D	L	GF	GA	GD	Pts
Deportes Iquique	6	3	1	2	7	6	+1	10
Cobreloa	6	3	0	2	6	5	+1	9
San Marcos de Arica	6	3	0	2	5	5	0	9
Deportes Antofagasta	6	2	1	3	6	8	-2	7

	CLOA	DANT	DIQU	SMAR
Cobreloa		2–0	0–1	1–0
D. Antofagasta	2–0		0–1	0–2
D. Iquique	2–0	3–3		0–1
San Marcos	0–3	0–1	2–0	

=== Group 2 ===
Team	Pld	W	D	L	GF	GA	GD	Pts
Coquimbo Unido	6	4	2	0	10	6	+4	14
Deportes Copiapó	6	3	1	2	4	2	+2	10
Cobresal	6	1	2	3	9	14	-5	3
Deportes La Serena	6	1	1	4	6	8	-2	0

	CSAL	COQU	DCOP	DLSE
Cobresal		2–2	2–2	3–2
Coquimbo U.	2–1		1–0	1–1
D. Copiapó	4–1	1–2		1–0
D. La Serena	2–0	1–2	0–1	

=== Group 3 ===
Team	Pld	W	D	L	GF	GA	GD	Pts
San Luis	6	2	4	0	8	4	+4	10
Everton	6	2	3	1	10	8	+2	9
Santiago Wanderers	6	1	4	1	10	9	+1	7
Unión La Calera	6	0	3	3	8	15	-7	3

	EVER	SLUI	SWAN	ULCA
Everton		0–1	1–1	1–0
San Luis	1–1		1–1	1–1
S. Wanderers	1–3	1–1		4–1
U. La Calera	4–4	0–3	2–2	

=== Group 4 ===
Team	Pld	W	D	L	GF	GA	GD	Pts
Audax Italiano	6	4	1	1	12	3	+9	13
Universidad Católica	6	4	0	2	16	9	+7	12
Magallanes	6	2	1	3	8	9	-1	7
Barnechea	6	0	2	4	5	20	-15	2

	AUDI	BARN	MAGA	UCAT
A. Italiano		3–0	1–0	3–0
Barnechea	1–1		0–3	1–6
Magallanes	0–3	2–2		1–2
U. Católica	2–1	5–1	1–2	

=== Group 5 ===
Team	Pld	W	D	L	GF	GA	GD	Pts
Unión Española	6	4	2	0	13	6	+7	14
Santiago Morning	6	3	1	2	16	10	+6	10
Palestino	6	2	0	4	8	13	-5	6
Unión San Felipe	6	1	1	4	6	14	-8	4

	PALE	SMOR	UESP	USFE
Palestino		3–2	0–2	2–1
S. Morning	3–1		0–2	6–1
U. Española	4–2	2–2		2–1
U. San Felipe	1–0	1–3	1–1	

=== Group 6 ===
Team	Pld	W	D	L	GF	GA	GD	Pts
Universidad de Chile	6	4	2	0	15	9	+6	14
O'Higgins	6	2	1	3	11	12	-1	7
Rangers	6	2	1	3	7	10	-3	7
Curicó Unido	6	2	0	4	9	11	-2	6

	CURI	OHIG	RANG	UCHI
Curicó U.		0–0	1–0	3–4
O'Higgins	2–1		1–2	2–3
Rangers	1–2	2–1		0–3
U. de Chile	1–0	2–2	2–2	

=== Group 7 ===
Team	Pld	W	D	L	GF	GA	GD	Pts
Colo-Colo	6	4	1	1	16	6	+10	13
Huachipato	6	4	1	1	8	4	+4	13
Deportes Concepción	6	2	1	3	6	9	-3	7
Ñublense	6	0	1	5	2	13	-11	1

	COLO	DCON	HUAC	ÑUBL
Colo-Colo		3–1	1–1	4–2
D. Concepción	1–3		1–0	1–0
Huachipato	1–0	3–2		2–0
Ñublense	0–5	0–0	0–1	

=== Group 8 ===
Team	Pld	W	D	L	GF	GA	GD	Pts
Deportes Puerto Montt	6	4	0	2	9	7	+2	12
Universidad de Concepción	6	3	2	1	10	8	+2	11
Deportes Temuco	6	2	1	3	9	10	-1	7
Iberia	6	1	1	4	9	12	-3	4

	DPM	DTEM	IBER	UCON
D. Puerto Montt		2–1	2–0	1–2
D. Temuco	0–2		3–2	1–2
Iberia	3–0	1–3		1–2
U. de Concepción	1–2	1–1	2–2	

== Second round ==
Team 1	Agg.	Team 2	1st leg	2nd leg
Deportes Copiapó	3–2	Deportes Iquique	1–1	2–1
Coquimbo U.	1–4	Colo-Colo	1–1	0–3
San Luis	3–4	Universidad de Chile	3–1	0–3
Everton	4–4 (5-6p)	Unión Española	1–2	3–2
Santiago Morning	2–4	Audax Italiano	1–3	1–1
Deportes Puerto Montt	4–6	Huachipato	1–1	3–5
Cobreloa	2–2 (4-3p)	Universidad Católica	2–0	0–2
O'Higgins	4–4 (1-4p)	Universidad de Concepción	2–2	2–2

== Quarterfinals ==
Team 1	Agg.	Team 2	1st leg	2nd leg
Deportes Copiapó	4–5	Colo-Colo	2–3	2–2
Cobreloa	0–5	Universidad de Chile	0–2	0–3
Audax Italiano	3–3 (2-4p)	Unión Española	1–0	2–3
Huachipato	1–3	Universidad de Concepción	0–1	1–2

== Semifinals ==
=== First leg ===
4 November 2015	Universidad de Concepción	0−1	Universidad de Chile	Talcahuano
18:30 CLT (UTC−03:00)		Report	85' Rubio	Stadium: CAP; Attendance: 3,603; Referee: Carlos Ulloa

4 November 2015	Colo-Colo	2−1	Unión Española	Macul, Santiago
21:00 CLT (UTC−03:00)	Fierro 16'; Delgado 21'; Baeza (red card) 39'	Report	47' Flores	Stadium: Monumental David Arellano; Attendance: 13,420; Referee: Enrique Osses

=== Second leg ===
19 November 2015	Universidad de Chile	2−0 (3−0 agg.)	Universidad de Concepción	Ñuñoa, Santiago
20:00 CLT (UTC−03:00)	Ubilla 50'; Magalhães 56'	Report	(red card) 90+2' Ponce	Stadium: Nacional; Attendance: 15,836; Referee: Claudio Puga

25 November 2015	Unión Española	2−1 (3−3 agg.) (4−5 p)	Colo-Colo	Independencia, Santiago
20:00 CLT (UTC−03:00)	Salom 21' (pen.); Berardo 90+5'	Report	62' Vilches	Stadium: Santa Laura; Attendance: 3,960; Referee: Patricio Polic
	Penalties
	Ferreyra (penalty scored); Berardo (penalty missed); Salom (penalty scored); Galdames (penalty scored); Sandoval (penalty scored)		(penalty scored) Valdés; (penalty scored) Fierro; (penalty scored) Barroso; (penalty scored) Paredes; (penalty scored) Vecchio

== Final ==
2 December 2015
20:00

Universidad de Chile	1–1	Colo-Colo
Corujo 25'	Report	Figueroa 90+2'
Penalties
Valencia (penalty scored); Espinoza (penalty scored); Matías Rodríguez (penalty scored); Corujo (penalty scored); Herrera (penalty scored)	5–3	(penalty scored) Valdés; (penalty missed) Martín Rodríguez; (penalty scored) Barroso; (penalty scored) Fierro

Estadio La Portada, La Serena
Attendance: 12,342
Referee: Julio Bascuñán

Copa Chile MTS
2015 Champion
U. de Chile
Fifth title

== Top goalscorers ==
Pos	Player	Club	Goals
1	(Chile) Felipe Mora	Audax Italiano	7
1	(Chile) Esteban Paredes	Colo-Colo	7
3	(Argentina) Juan Muriel Orlando	Deportes Copiapó	6
3	(Argentina) Gastón Lezcano	O'Higgins	6
3	(Argentina) David Escalante	Santiago Morning	6
3	(Chile) David Llanos	Universidad Católica	6
3	(Chile) Gustavo Canales	Universidad de Chile	6
8	(Chile) Manuel Villalobos	Deportes Iquique	5
8	(Argentina) Carlos Salom	Unión Española	5
8	(Argentina) Juan Carlos Ferreyra	Unión Española	5
