= Ignacio Tapia (footballer, born 1999) =

Chilean footballer

Personal information
- Full name: Ignacio Tapia Bustamante
- Date of birth: 22 February 1999 (age 27)
- Place of birth: Concepción, Chile
- Height: 1.89 m (6 ft 2 1/2 in)
- Position: Defender

Team information
- Current team: Atlético Grau

Youth career
- Huachipato

Senior career*
Years	Team	Apps	(Gls)
2016–2021	Huachipato	64	(2)
2022–2025	Universidad de Chile	49	(1)
2026–	Atlético Grau	0	(0)

International career^{‡}
2018	Chile U20	5	(0)
Medal record
Men's football
Representing Chile
South American Games
Gold medal – first place	2018 Cochabamba
- * Club domestic league appearances and goals as of 7 December 2025 ‡ National team caps and goals as of 8 February 2025

Ignacio Tapia Bustamante (born 22 February 1999) is a Chilean footballer who plays as a defender for Peruvian club Atlético Grau.

== Club career ==
Tapia joined Universidad de Chile from Huachipato in 2022. He left them at the end of the 2025 season.

After leaving Universidad de Chile, Tapia moved abroad and signed with Peruvian club Atlético Grau.

== International career ==
At under-20 level, Tapia represented Chile in the 2018 South American Games, winning the gold medal,

Tapia was called up to the Chile senior squad for the first time in June 2017, and was an unused substitute in a 3–0 win over Burkina Faso.

== Career statistics ==
=== Club ===
As of 2 March 2025.

Club	Season	League			Cup		Continental		Other		Total	
Club	Season	Division	Apps	Goals	Apps	Goals	Apps	Goals	Apps	Goals	Apps	Goals
Huachipato	2016–17	Chilean Primera División	2	0	0	0	–		0	0	2	0
Huachipato	2017	Chilean Primera División	0	0	3 (Note: Appearances in the Copa Chile)	0	–		0	0	3	0
Huachipato	2018	Chilean Primera División	4	0	1	0	–		0	0	5	0
Huachipato	2019	Chilean Primera División	1	0	0	0	–		0	0	1	0
Huachipato	2020	Chilean Primera División	28	1	0	0	4 (Note: Appearances in Copa Sudamericana)	0	0	0	32	1
Huachipato	2021	Chilean Primera División	29	1	1	0	8	0	2 (Note: Appearances in promotion/relegation play-offs)	0	40	1
Huachipato	Total		64	2	5	0	12	0	2	0	83	2
Universidad de Chile	2022	Chilean Primera División	20	0	2	0	–		–		22	0
Universidad de Chile	2023	Chilean Primera División	11	1	1	0	–		–		12	1
Universidad de Chile	2024	Chilean Primera División	10	0	5	0	–		–		15	0
Universidad de Chile	2025	Chilean Primera División	3	0	6	0	0	0	–		9	0
Universidad de Chile	Total		44	1	14	0	0	0	–		58	1
Career total			108	3	19	0	12	0	2	0	141	3

=== International ===
As of match played 8 February 2025

Appearances and goals by national team and year
National team	Year	Apps	Goals
Chile	2025	0	0
Total		0	0

== Honours ==
Universidad de Chile

- Copa Chile: 2024
- Supercopa de Chile: 2025

Chile U20

- South American Games Gold medal: 2018
