= 2015 Supercopa de Chile =

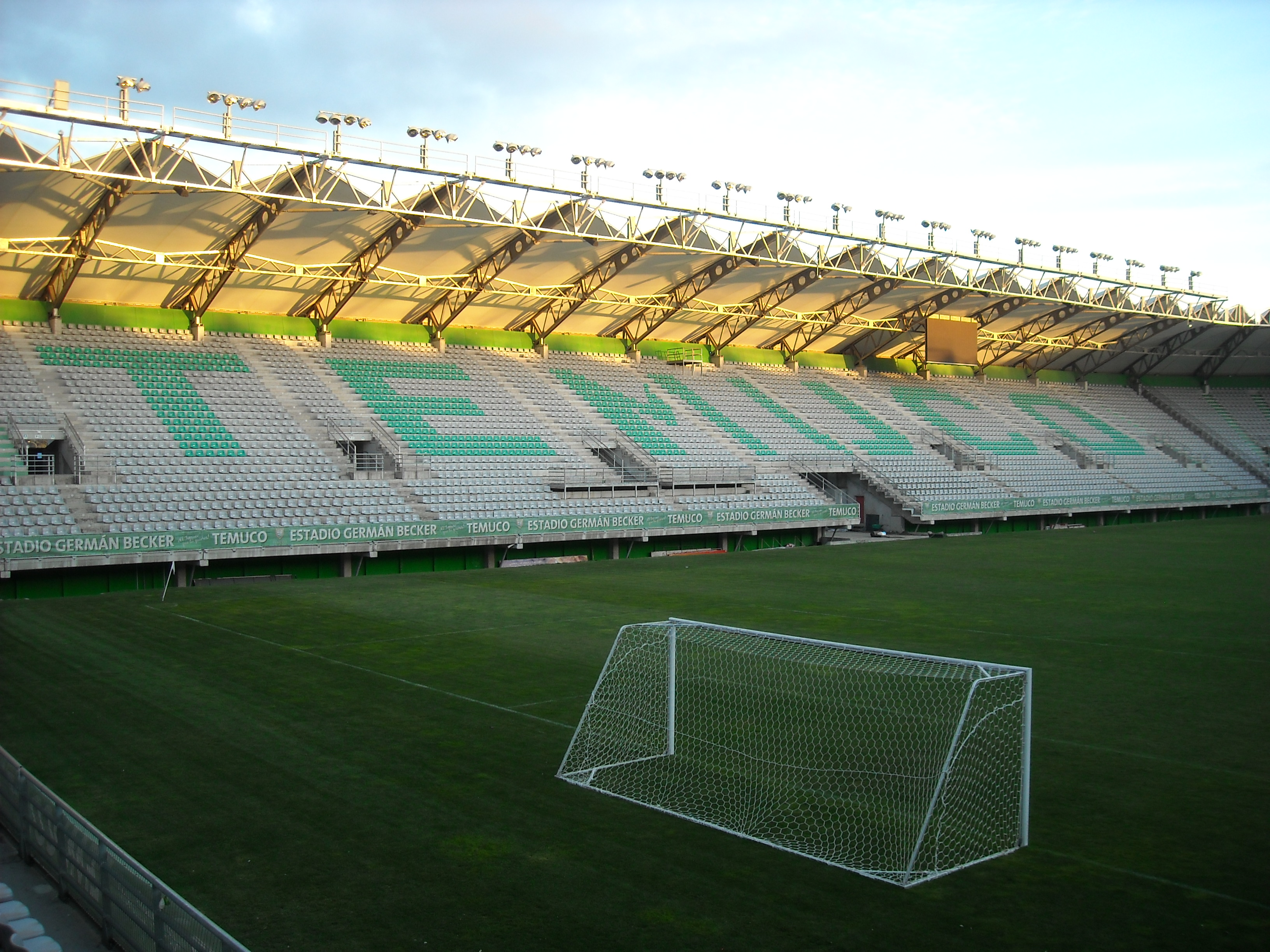
- Germán Becker Stadium, venue of the match
- Event: Supercopa de Chile 2015
Universidad de Chile	Universidad de Concepción
2	1
- Date: 30 September 2015
- Venue: Estadio Germán Becker, Temuco
- Weather: Clear; 11 °C (52 °F)

The 2015 Supercopa de Chile was the third edition of this championship organised by the ANFP.

The match was played between the 2014-15 Primera División Best-Champions Universidad de Chile, and the 2014–15 Copa Chile Winners Universidad de Concepción.

== Road to the final ==
The two teams that contested the Supercopa were Universidad de Chile, that qualified as Apertura 2014 Champion and the Best Champion in the accumulated table, and Universidad de Concepción, that qualified for the match as the winner of the 2014–15 Copa Chile, defeating Palestino 3:2 at the Estadio Fiscal de Talca.

Universidad de Chile	Universidad de Concepción
Apertura 2014 Champion and Best-Champion	Winner of the 2014–15 Copa Chile

== Details ==
30 September 2015
20:00

Universidad de Chile	2–1	Universidad de Concepción
Suárez 9'; Rodríguez 80'	Report	Manríquez 90'

Estadio Germán Becker, Temuco
Attendance: 12,522
Referee: Patricio Polic

== Champion ==
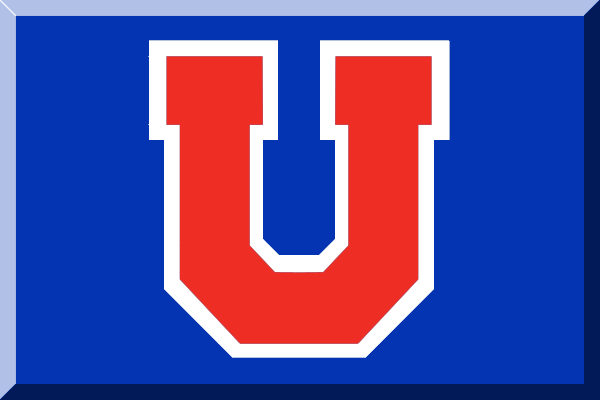
Champion
Universidad de Chile
1st title
