= 2018 Supercopa de Chile =

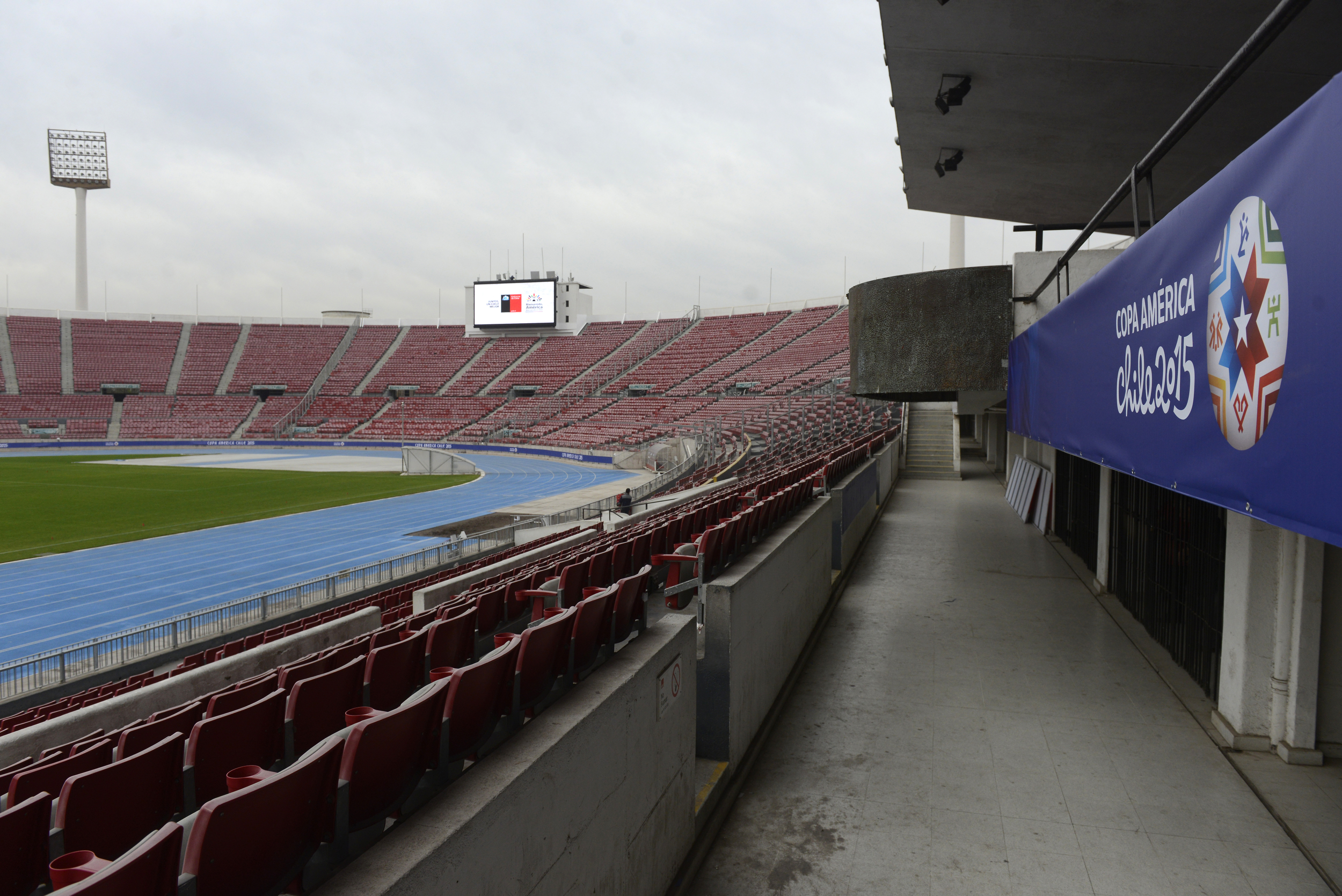
- Event: Súper Copa MG 2018
Colo-Colo	Santiago Wanderers
3	0
- Date: 26 January 2018
- Venue: Estadio Nacional, Santiago
- Referee: César Deischler
- Attendance: 25,000

The 2018 Supercopa de Chile (known as the 2018 Súper Copa MG for sponsorship purposes) was the sixth edition of the Supercopa de Chile, championship organised by the Asociación Nacional de Fútbol Profesional (ANFP). The match was played by the 2017 Chilean Primera División champions Colo-Colo and the 2017 Copa Chile winners Santiago Wanderers. Colo-Colo were the champions after winning 3–0 in normal time.

== Teams ==
The two teams that contested the Supercopa were Colo-Colo, who qualified as 2017 Transición champions and Santiago Wanderers, who qualified for the match as the 2017 Copa Chile winners, defeating Universidad de Chile 3–1 at the Estadio Ester Roa.

Colo-Colo	Santiago Wanderers
2017 Transición champions	2017 Copa Chile winners

== Details ==
26 January 2018
19:00 UTC−3

Colo-Colo	3–0	Santiago Wanderers
Opazo 28'; Véjar 38'; Valdés 44'	Report

Estadio Nacional, Santiago
Attendance: 25,000
Referee: César Deischler
