= Pablo Milad =

Chilean politician (born 1964)

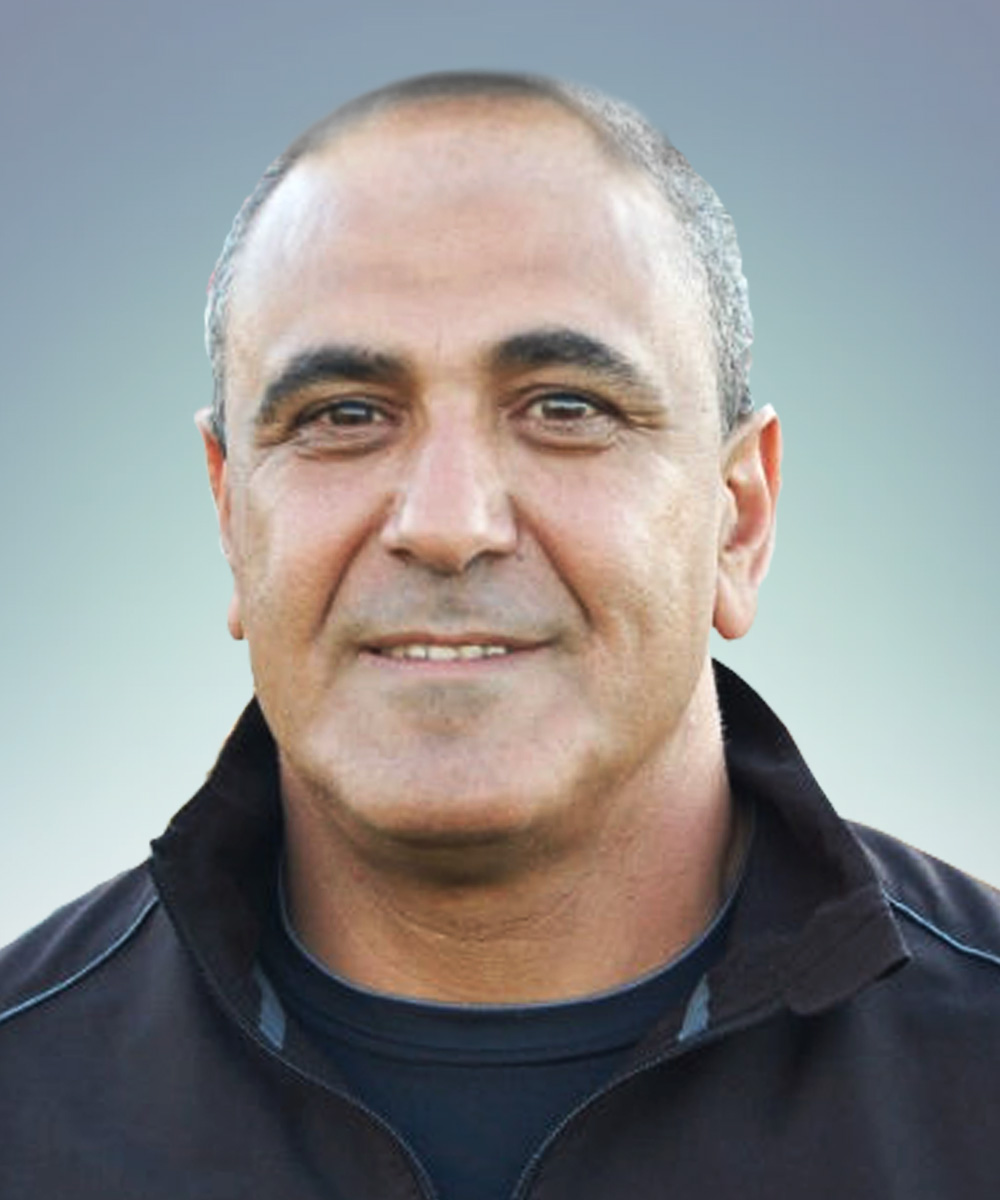

President of the ANFP
- Incumbent
- Assumed office 30 July 2020
- Preceded by: Sebastián Moreno

Intendant of the Maule Region
- In office 11 March 2018 – 3 June 2020
- President: Sebastián Piñera
- Preceded by: Pablo Meza
- Succeeded by: Juan Eduardo Prieto

Personal details
- Born: 15 February 1964 (age 62) Curicó, Chile
- Party: Evópoli
- Children: Two
- Education: Metropolitan University of Technology
- Occupation: Licensed in Physical Education

Pablo Antonio Milad Abusleme (born 15 February 1964) is a Chilean politician and leader who currently serves as president of the Asociación Nacional de Fútbol Profesional (ANFP).

== Sports career ==
Milad did throwing sports, becoming South American champion in shot put. In 2014, he also became national masters athletics champion in combined track and field (shot put, discus throw, hammer throw, javelin throw).
