= 2017 Supercopa de Chile =

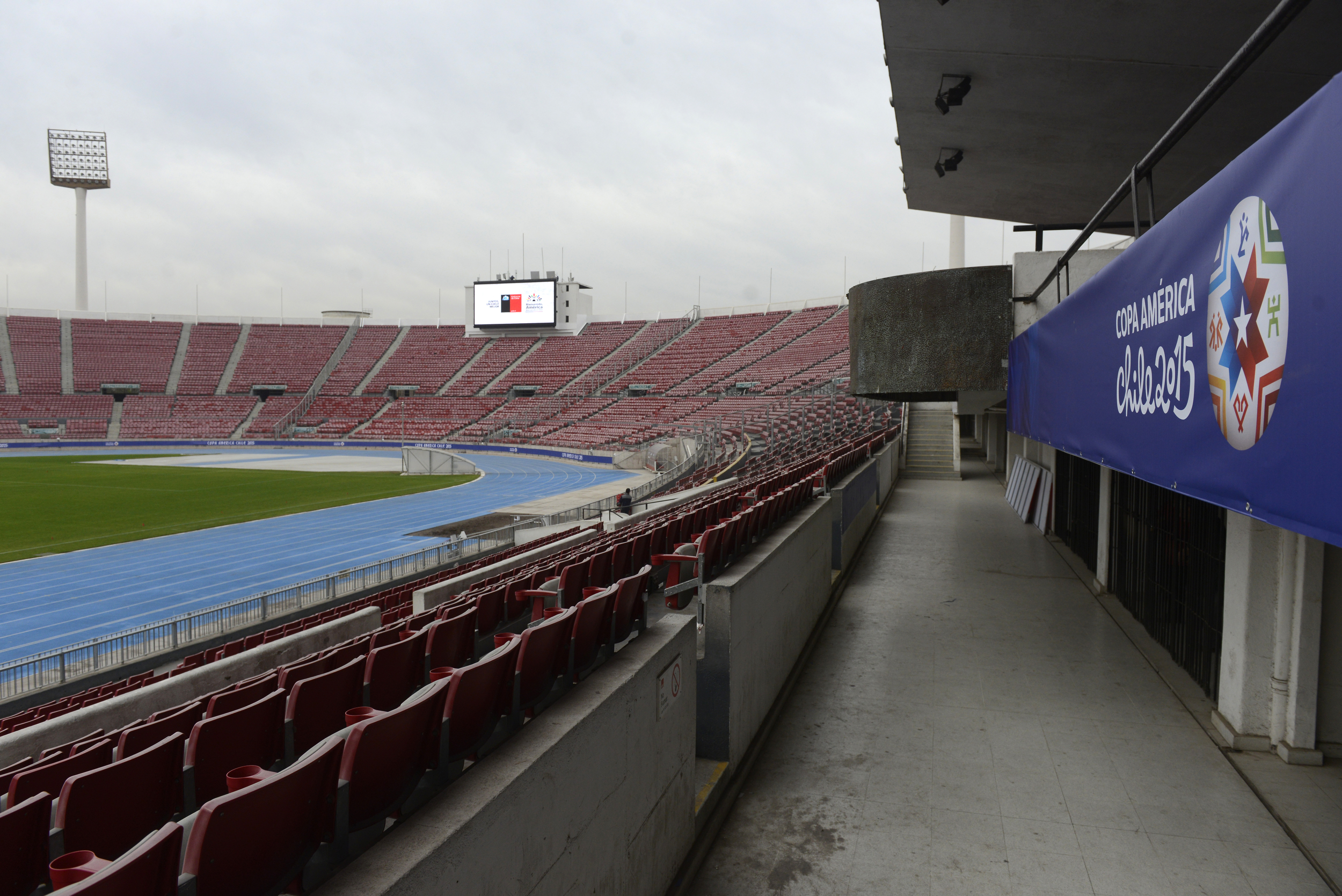
- Event: Supercopa de Chile 2017
Universidad Católica	Colo-Colo
1	4
- Date: 23 July 2017
- Venue: Estadio Nacional, Santiago
- Weather: Clear; 20 °C (68 °F)

The 2017 Supercopa de Chile was the fourth edition of the championship organised by the Asociación Nacional de Fútbol Profesional (ANFP).

The match was played between the 2016-17 Primera División Best-Champions Universidad Católica, and the 2016 Copa Chile Winners Colo-Colo.

== Road to the final ==
The two teams that contested the Supercopa were Universidad Católica, that qualified as Apertura 2016-17 Champion and the Best Champion in the accumulated table, and Colo-Colo, that qualified for the match as the winner of the 2016 Copa Chile, defeating Everton 4:0 at the Estadio Nacional.

Universidad Católica	Colo-Colo
Apertura 2016-17 Champion and Best-Champion	Winner of the 2016 Copa Chile

== Details ==
23 July 2017
12:00

Universidad Católica	1–4	Colo-Colo
Kuscevic 29'	Report	Paredes 31'; Vilches 54'; Valdés 61'; Paredes 74'

Estadio Nacional, Santiago
Attendance: 35,000
Referee: Julio Bascuñán
