= Asociación Nacional de Fútbol Profesional =

Governing body of association football in Chile

Football Federation of Chile
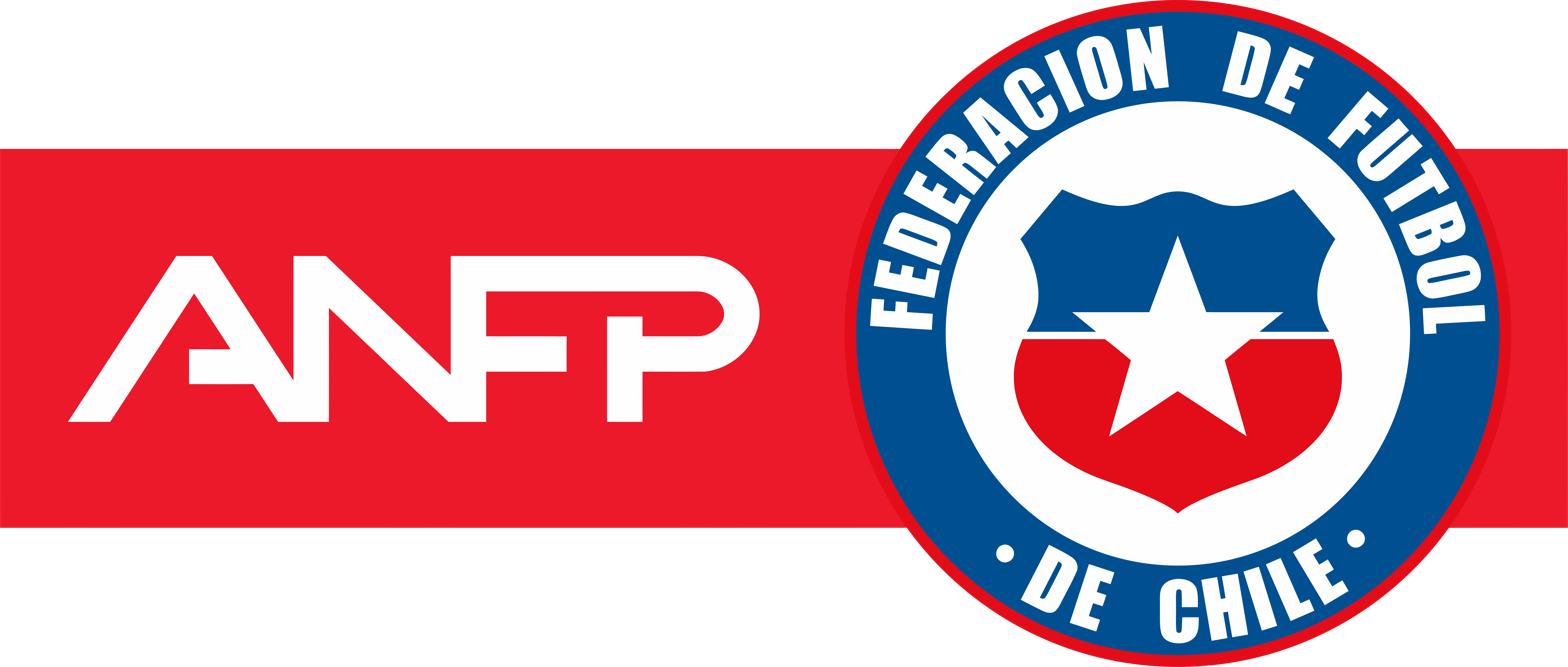
- Founded: 23 October 1987; 38 years ago
- Headquarters: Santiago, Chile
- FIFA affiliation: 1914
- Football Federation of Chile affiliation: 1916
- President: Pablo Milad Abusleme
- Website: anfp.cl

The Asociación Nacional de Fútbol Profesional (ANFP) monitors all the conforming clubs and acts as the organizational body for professional competitions, governing the Primera División de Chile and Primera B with 32 associate clubs all together. In 2008, it also established the Primera División of the national female football league, which comprises 14 teams.

== Structure and functions ==
Legally, it is a corporation of deprived right, different from and independent of the clubs that integrate with it, and comprises the Federación de Fútbol de Chile. Through this linkage, it is related to the Olympic Committee of Chile, the CONMEBOL and FIFA, accepting the statutes, regulations and rules of the game promulgated by the International Board F.A.

== History ==
Before the formal establishment of the ANFP on 23 October 1987, there were four organisations performing the same functions in different eras. The first one was the Liga Profesional de Fútbol (LPF) created in 1933 by the dissident clubs of the Asociación de Fútbol de Santiago (AFS), the first organizer of a national football competition, after a dispute over the policy of paying salaries to their players. The dissident clubs included Unión Española, Bádminton, Colo-Colo, Audax Italiano, Green Cross, Morning Star, Magallanes and Santiago National, which used the percentage of their income which they originally had to submit to the AFS to establish the LPF. In 1934, a compromise was reached between the LPF and the AFS, resulting in their merger. The newly formed body was renamed the Sección Profesional de la Asociación Santiago, and three years later, on 18 February 1937, there arose the Asociación de Fútbol Profesional. Then, on 29 May 1938, the Asociación Central de Fútbol (ACF) replaced the Asociación de Fútbol Profesional, and functioned as the governing body of professional football in Chile until the mid-eighties. Finally, the ANFP was established in 1987 and has been performing the job of its predecessors since then. In summary, the different eras of the organization of professional football in Chile are:

- 1933: Liga Profesional de Fútbol (LPF)
- 1934-1936: Sección Profesional de la Asociación de Fútbol de Santiago
- 1937: Asociación de Fútbol Profesional
- 1938-1986: Asociación Central de Fútbol (ACF)
- Since 1987: Asociación Nacional de Fútbol Profesional (ANFP)

== Youth Players Rule ==
In the 2015–16 Chilean football season the Youth Players Rule was adopted, the rule specifies that all professional teams must include at least two Chilean players born on or after 1 July 1995 in their team lineup, and that a youth player of the team plays at least 675 minutes. The rule is for Campeonato Nacional, Primera B de Chile, Segunda División de Chile and Copa Chile. The rule does not apply to international competitions such as Copa Libertadores or Copa Sudamericana. Teams that do not comply with this regulation will suffer the loss of three points plus a fine of five hundred development units (500 UF), which will be deducted from both the table of the regular season, and the cumulative standings.

== Authorities ==
The Association is under the leadership of the following authorities:

- Council of Presidents, the body with highest authority, composed of the chairmen of all clubs from Primera División and Primera B;
- Board of Directors, composed of the President of ANFP with six directors;
- President, the legal representative of the Association;
- Court, the body being responsible for affairs concerning discipline, heritage and honor;
- Permanent and Transitional Commissions, which establish the Council and the Board of Directors.

== Organizations of the Association ==
The following bodies are responsible for different aspects of the Association:

- Committee on Operations
- Youth Football Committee
- Arbitration Commission
- Legal Commission
- Doping Control Commission: responsible for ensuring compliance with international doping regulations
- National Technical Commission: responsible for planning for the Chile national football team
- Review Commission of Audits: responsible for inspecting and reviewing the bookkeeping of the Association, all its agencies, and associated clubs
- Disciplinary Tribunal: responsible for dealing with sanctions due to violations of rules and regulations of the Federation, the foundation of competition, and the regulations of FIFA.
- Tribunal of Honor
- Tribunal of Hereditary Affairs: responsible for resolving conflicts that arise between the clubs or between the clubs and the Association, regarding the interpretation, application, compliance, denial, resolution, invalidity, etc. of a contract or agreement. It also has jurisdiction over and judges situations arising from contractual liability of the Association and clubs that breach a contract or agreement

== See also ==
- Asociación Nacional de Fútbol Amateur de Chile
