= Supercopa de Chile =

- Founded: 2013
- Region: Chile
- Teams: 2 (until 2025); 4 (2026–present)
- Current champions: Coquimbo Unido (1st title)
- Most championships: Colo-Colo; Universidad Católica (4 titles each)
- Broadcaster(s): TNT Sports; Canal 13
- Website: ANFP Website
- 2026 Supercopa de Chile

The Supercopa de Chile (Supercup of Chile) is an annual one-match football official competition in Chile organised by the Asociación Nacional de Fútbol Profesional (ANFP).

This competition serves as the season opener and is played between the Campeonato Nacional Champions and the winners of the Copa Chile of the previous season. On 14 October 2025, it was announced that the Supercopa would expand to four teams, the winners and runners-up of the Copa Chile and Campeonato Nacional.

== History ==
On 14 May 2013, Sergio Jadue, president of the National Association of Professional Football of Chile (ANFP) decided to approve the creation of a supercup competition to be played by the champions of both the Campeonato Nacional and the Copa Chile. The first Supercopa was held that same year when Unión Española faced Universidad de Chile at Estadio Regional in Antofagasta.

The stadium that hosted the match and the date are defined when the two teams are qualified, for reason of distance between the two clubs. In 2013, the trophy was played in Antofagasta, and in 2014 was played in Santiago.

== Sponsorships ==
Year	Sponsor
2013	(Germany) Stihl
2014	(Spain) Movistar
2015	(None)
2016-2017	(Chile) (Canada) Scotiabank
2018	(China) MG Motor
2019–2023	(Chile) Easy
2024	(United States) Coca-Cola Sin Azúcar
2025	(Chile) Construmart
2026–present	(Puerto Rico) Lanco

== Finals by year ==
=== Two-team format ===
Ed.	Year	Champion	Scores	Runner-up	Venue
1	2013	Unión Española (1)	2–0	Universidad de Chile	Estadio Regional, Antofagasta
2	2014	O'Higgins (1)	1–1 (3–2 p)	Deportes Iquique	Estadio San Carlos de Apoquindo, Santiago
3	2015	Universidad de Chile (1)	2–1	Universidad de Concepción	Estadio Germán Becker, Temuco
4	2016	Universidad Católica (1)	2–1	Universidad de Chile	Estadio Ester Roa, Concepción
5	2017	Colo-Colo (1)	4–1	Universidad Católica	Estadio Nacional, Santiago
6	2018	Colo-Colo (2)	3–0	Santiago Wanderers	Estadio Nacional, Santiago
7	2019	Universidad Católica (2)	5–0	Palestino	Estadio Sausalito, Viña del Mar
8	2020	Universidad Católica (3)	4–2	Colo-Colo	Estadio Nacional, Santiago
9	2021	Universidad Católica (4)	1–1 (7–6 p)	Ñublense	Estadio Ester Roa, Concepción
10	2022	Colo-Colo (3)	2–0	Universidad Católica	Estadio Ester Roa, Concepción
11	2023	Magallanes (1)	1–1 (4–3 p)	Colo-Colo	Estadio Sausalito, Viña del Mar
12	2024	Colo-Colo (4)	2–0	Huachipato	Estadio Nacional, Santiago (Note: Final minutes of the match played at Estadio El Teniente, Rancagua.)
13	2025	Universidad de Chile (2)	3–0	Colo-Colo	Estadio Santa Laura, Santiago

=== Four-team format ===
Ed.	Year	Champion	Scores	Runner-up	Semi-finalists	Venue
14	2026	Coquimbo Unido (1)	0–0 (8–7 p)	Universidad Católica	Deportes Limache; Huachipato	Estadio Sausalito, Viña del Mar

== Performance ==
=== Performance by club ===
Club	Titles	Runners-up	Semi-finalists	Seasons won	Seasons runner-up	Season semi-finalist	Appearances
Colo-Colo	4	3	—	2017, 2018, 2022, 2024	2020, 2023, 2025	—	7
Universidad Católica	4	3	—	2016, 2019, 2020, 2021	2017, 2022, 2026	—	7
Universidad de Chile	2	2	—	2015, 2025	2013, 2016	—	4
Coquimbo Unido	1	—	—	2026	—	—	1
Magallanes	1	—	—	2023	—	—	1
O'Higgins	1	—	—	2014	—	—	1
Unión Española	1	—	—	2013	—	—	1
Huachipato	—	1	1	—	2024	2026	2
Ñublense	—	1	—	—	2021	—	1
Palestino	—	1	—	—	2019	—	1
Santiago Wanderers	—	1	—	—	2018	—	1
Universidad de Concepción	—	1	—	—	2015	—	1
Deportes Iquique	—	1	—	—	2014	—	1
Deportes Limache	—	—	1	—	—	2026	1
