= 2015–16 Campeonato Nacional Primera División =

Campeonato Nacional
- Season: 2015–16
- Champions: 2015 Apertura: Colo-Colo (31st title); 2016 Clausura: Universidad Católica (11th title)
- 2016 Copa Libertadores: Colo-Colo
- 2016 Copa Sudamericana: Universidad Católica
- 2017 Copa Libertadores: Universidad Católica

The 2015–16 Campeonato Nacional season was the 85th season of top-flight football in Chile. Cobresal was the defending champion.

== Format changes ==
Same as last season: Apertura and Clausura format, without playoffs.

== Teams ==
=== Stadia and locations ===
Locations of the 2015 Chile Primera División teams.

Team	City	Stadium
Audax Italiano	Santiago	Bicentenario de La Florida
Cobresal	El Salvador	El Cobre
Colo-Colo	Santiago	Monumental David Arellano
Deportes Antofagasta	Antofagasta	Calvo y Bascuñán
Deportes Iquique	Iquique	Tierra de Campeones
Huachipato	Talcahuano	CAP
O'Higgins	Rancagua	El Teniente
Palestino	Santiago	Municipal de La Cisterna
San Luis de Quillota	Quillota	Lucio Fariña Fernández
San Marcos de Arica	Arica	Carlos Dittborn
Santiago Wanderers	Valparaíso	Elías Figueroa Brander
Unión Española	Santiago	Santa Laura Universidad-SEK
Unión La Calera	La Calera	Municipal Nicolás Chahuán
Universidad Católica	Santiago	San Carlos de Apoquindo
Universidad de Chile	Santiago	Nacional Julio Martínez Pradanos
Universidad de Concepción	Concepción	Alcaldesa Ester Roa Rebolledo

=== Personnel and kits ===
Team	Head coach	Captain	Kit manufacturer	Sponsors
Audax Italiano	(Chile) Jorge Pellicer	(Chile) Rafael Olarra	Dalponte	Ideal
Cobresal	(Argentina) Dalcio Giovagnoli	(Chile) Johan Fuentes	Lotto	PF
Colo-Colo	(Chile) José Luis Sierra	(Chile) Gonzalo Fierro	Under Armour	DirecTV
Deportes Antofagasta	(Spain) Beñat San José	(Chile) Cristián Rojas	Training	Minera Escondida
Deportes Iquique	(Chile) Jaime Vera	(Chile) Rodrigo Naranjo	Lotto	ZOFRI
Huachipato	(Chile) Miguel Ponce	(Chile) Claudio Muñoz	Mitre	
O'Higgins	(Argentina) Cristián Arán	(Chile) Braulio Leal	New Balance	VTR
Palestino	(Chile) Nicolás Córdova	(Chile) Leonardo Valencia	Training	Bank of Palestine
San Luis de Quillota	(Chile) Miguel Ramírez	(Argentina) Fernando de Paul	Delpotte	PF
San Marcos de Arica	(Chile) Emiliano Astorga	(Chile) Pedro Carrizo	Dalponte	Terminal Puerto Arica
Santiago Wanderers	(Uruguay) Alfredo Arias	(Chile) Jorge Ormeño	Mitre	Terminal Pacifico Sur Valparaiso
Unión Española	(Chile) Fernando Vergara	(Chile) Jorge Ampuero	Joma	Universidad SEK
Unión La Calera	(Uruguay) Leonardo Ramos	(Argentina) Lucas Giovini	Training	PF
Universidad Católica	(Chile) Mario Salas	(Chile) Cristian Álvarez	Umbro	DirecTV
Universidad de Chile	(Argentina) Sebastián Becaccece	(Chile) Johnny Herrera	Adidas	Claro
Universidad de Concepción	(Chile) Ronald Fuentes	(Chile) Gabriel Vargas	KS7	Universidad de Concepción

== Torneo Apertura ==
=== Standings ===
Pos	Team	Pld	W	D	L	GF	GA	GD	Pts	Qualification
1	Colo-Colo	15	11	0	4	24	14	+10	33	2016 Copa Libertadores group stage
2	Universidad Católica	15	10	2	3	33	15	+18	32	Apertura Liguilla
3	Universidad de Concepción	15	9	1	5	29	19	+10	28	Apertura Liguilla
4	Palestino	15	8	4	3	23	17	+6	28	Apertura Liguilla
5	Audax Italiano	15	7	5	3	22	19	+3	26	Apertura Liguilla
6	Unión Española	15	7	3	5	30	20	+10	24	
7	O'Higgins	15	7	2	6	23	23	0	23	
8	Santiago Wanderers	15	5	5	5	20	19	+1	20	
9	Cobresal	15	6	0	9	23	28	−5	18	
10	San Marcos de Arica	15	5	2	8	18	20	−2	17	
11	Universidad de Chile	15	4	5	6	24	30	−6	17	
12	Huachipato	15	4	4	7	16	21	−5	16	
13	Deportes Iquique	15	4	4	7	20	28	−8	16	
14	Unión La Calera	15	4	3	8	13	27	−14	15	
15	San Luis de Quillota	15	4	1	10	18	24	−6	13	
16	Deportes Antofagasta	15	2	5	8	11	22	−11	11	

=== Apertura Liguilla ===
Following the conclusion of the regular season, the teams placed 2nd to 5th advanced to the Liguilla in order to determine the "Chile 1" spot to the 2016 Copa Sudamericana.

Semifinals
Universidad Católica	1	2	3
Audax Italiano	2	0	2
Universidad de Concepción	1	0	1
Palestino	2	1	3

Final
Universidad Católica	1	4	5
Palestino	2	1	3

==== Semifinals ====
10 December 2015 1st Leg	Audax Italiano	2–1	Universidad Católica	Estadio Bicentenario de La Florida, Santiago
20:00	Mora 65'; Vallejos 76'	Report	Fuentes 51'	Attendance: 1,760; Referee: Julio Bascuñán

13 December 2015 2nd Leg	Universidad Católica	2–0	Audax Italiano	Estadio San Carlos de Apoquindo, Santiago
19:30	Vargas 70'; Ríos (red card) 73'; Rojas 76'	Report		Attendance: 4,105; Referee: Eduardo Gamboa

Universidad Católica won 3–2 on aggregate.

10 December 2015 1st Leg	Palestino	2–1	Universidad de Concepción	Estadio Municipal de La Cisterna, Santiago
17:30	Gutiérrez 63', 87'	Report	Manríquez 50'	Attendance: 824; Referee: Claudio Puga

13 December 2015 2nd Leg	Universidad de Concepción	0–1	Palestino	Estadio Municipal, Yumbel
17:00		Report	Zacaría 45'	Attendance: 853; Referee: Roberto Tobar

Palestino won 3–1 on aggregate.

==== Finals ====
17 December 2015 1st Leg	Palestino	2–1	Universidad Católica	Estadio Santa Laura-Universidad SEK, Santiago
20:00	Alarcón 31'; Zacaría 78'	Report	Sierralta 13'	Attendance: 3,334; Referee: Julio Bascuñán

20 December 2015 2nd Leg	Universidad Católica	4–1	Palestino	Estadio San Carlos de Apoquindo, Santiago
19:30	Llanos 31'; Farías 71' (o.g.); Vargas 75'; Ríos 85'	Report	Riquelme 68'	Attendance: 7,237; Referee: Eduardo Gamboa

Universidad Católica won 5–3 on aggregate and qualified for the 2016 Copa Sudamericana.

== Torneo Clausura ==
=== Standings ===
Pos	Team	Pld	W	D	L	GF	GA	GD	Pts	Qualification
1	Universidad Católica	15	9	2	4	33	25	+8	29	2017 Copa Libertadores group stage
2	Colo-Colo	15	8	4	3	19	11	+8	28	
3	O'Higgins	15	8	4	3	28	24	+4	28	Clausura Liguilla
4	Palestino	15	6	7	2	24	18	+6	25	
5	Universidad de Concepción	15	8	1	6	22	24	−2	25	
6	Santiago Wanderers	15	6	5	4	31	26	+5	23	Clausura Liguilla
7	Deportes Antofagasta	15	6	3	6	23	18	+5	21	Clausura Liguilla
9	Deportes Iquique	15	4	7	4	23	22	+1	19	Clausura Liguilla
9	Huachipato	15	4	7	4	26	27	−1	19	
10	Universidad de Chile	15	3	7	5	29	25	+4	16	
11	Audax Italiano	15	3	7	5	16	19	−3	16	
12	San Luis de Quillota	15	3	7	5	22	25	−3	16	
13	Unión Española	15	2	9	4	20	24	−4	15	
14	Cobresal	15	3	5	7	14	21	−7	14	
15	San Marcos de Arica	15	2	6	7	10	17	−7	12	
16	Unión La Calera	15	2	5	8	16	30	−14	11	

Updated to match(es) played on 26 April 2016. Source: Standings
Rules for classification: 1) points; 2) goal difference; 3) number of goals scored.

=== Clausura Liguilla ===
Following the conclusion of the regular season, the teams placed 2nd to 5th qualify for the Liguilla in order to determine the "Chile 2" spot to the 2016 Copa Sudamericana. However, teams that already played the 2016 Copa Libertadores (from second stage onwards) and both finalists of Copa Chile are ineligible to compete in the Liguilla. These teams are the following:

- Colo-Colo (2nd), played in Copa Libertadores. Despite having qualified for Copa Sudamericana as being runners-up of Copa Chile, their spot was removed and given to a team in the aggregate table, as a team cannot qualify for two international tournaments in a calendar year.
- Palestino (4th), already qualified for the Copa Sudamericana through the aggregate table.
- Universidad de Concepción (5th), already qualified for the Copa Sudamericana through the aggregate table.

Semifinals
O'Higgins	3	0	3
Deportes Iquique	1	1	2
Santiago Wanderers (p)	0	0	0 (4)
Deportes Antofagasta	0	0	0 (3)

Final
O'Higgins	0	1	1
Santiago Wanderers	0	0	0

==== Semifinals ====
4 May 2016 1st Leg	Deportes Iquique	1–3	O'Higgins	Estadio Tierra de Campeones, Iquique
22:00	Zenteno (red card) 51'; Villalobos 70'	Report	San Juan 17'; Acevedo 38'; Insaurralde 49'	Attendance: 3,180; Referee: Carlos Ulloa

8 May 2016 2nd Leg	O'Higgins	0–1	Deportes Iquique	Estadio El Teniente, Rancagua
18:00		Report	Ríos 82'	Attendance: 6,320; Referee: Eduardo Gamboa

O'Higgins won 3–2 on aggregate.

4 May 2016 1st Leg	Deportes Antofagasta	0–0	Santiago Wanderers	Estadio Regional Calvo y Bascuñán, Antofagasta
19:30		Report		Attendance: 2,532; Referee: Cristián Andaur

8 May 2016 2nd Leg	Santiago Wanderers	0–0 (4–3 p)	Deportes Antofagasta	Estadio Elías Figueroa Brander, Valparaíso
16:00		Report		Attendance: 4,482; Referee: Patricio Polic
	Penalties
	Muñoz (penalty missed); Fernández (penalty scored); Luna (penalty missed); Ramos (penalty scored); Viana (penalty scored); Saldías (penalty missed); Rosales (penalty missed); Cuadra (penalty scored)		(penalty scored) Ciampichetti; (penalty missed) Villagra; (penalty scored) Leyton; (penalty missed) Riquelme; (penalty scored) Dituro; (penalty missed) Delfino; (penalty missed) Jerez; (penalty missed) Cabrera

0–0 on aggregate. Santiago Wanderers won 4–3 on penalties.

==== Finals ====
11 May 2016 1st Leg	Santiago Wanderers	0–0	O'Higgins	Estadio Elías Figueroa Brander, Valparaíso
20:00		Report	Insaurralde (red card) 49'	Attendance: 4,628; Referee: Claudio Puga

15 May 2016 2nd Leg	O'Higgins	1–0	Santiago Wanderers	Estadio El Teniente, Rancagua
16:00	Acevedo 10'	Report		Attendance: 7,242; Referee: Julio Bascuñán

O'Higgins won 1–0 on aggregate and qualified for the 2016 Copa Sudamericana.

== Aggregate table ==
Pos	Team	Pld	W	D	L	GF	GA	GD	Pts	Qualification or relegation
1	Universidad Católica	30	19	4	7	66	40	+26	61	2016 Copa Sudamericana first stage and 2016 Supercopa de Chile match
2	Colo-Colo	30	19	4	7	42	24	+18	61	
3	Palestino	30	14	11	5	47	35	+12	53	2016 Copa Sudamericana first stage
4	Universidad de Concepción	30	17	2	11	51	43	+8	53	2016 Copa Sudamericana first stage
5	O'Higgins	30	15	6	9	51	47	+4	51	
6	Santiago Wanderers	30	11	10	9	51	45	+6	43	
7	Audax Italiano	30	10	12	8	38	38	0	42	
8	Unión Española	30	9	12	9	50	44	+6	39	
9	Huachipato	30	8	11	11	41	47	−6	35	
10	Deportes Iquique	30	8	11	11	43	50	−7	35	
11	Universidad de Chile	30	7	12	11	53	55	−2	33	2016 Supercopa de Chile match
12	Deportes Antofagasta	30	8	8	14	34	41	−7	32	
13	Cobresal	30	9	5	16	37	49	−12	32	
14	San Luis de Quillota	30	7	8	15	40	49	−9	29	
15	San Marcos de Arica	30	7	8	15	28	37	−9	29	Relegation to 2016–17 Primera B de Chile
16	Unión La Calera	30	6	8	16	29	57	−28	26	Relegation to 2016–17 Primera B de Chile

== See also ==
- 2015–16 Primera B de Chile
- 2015–16 Segunda División Profesional de Chile
