= 2014–15 Campeonato Nacional Primera División =

Campeonato Nacional
- Season: 2014–15
- Champions: 2014 Apertura: Universidad de Chile (17th title); 2015 Clausura: Cobresal (1st title)
- 2015 Copa Libertadores: Universidad de Chile; Palestino
- 2015 Copa Sudamericana: Santiago Wanderers; U. de Concepción; Huachipato; Univ. Católica
- 2016 Copa Libertadores: Cobresal

The 2014–15 Campeonato Nacional season was the 84th season of top-flight football in Chile. Colo-Colo was the defending champion.

== Format changes ==
Same as last season: Apertura and Clausura format, without playoffs.

== Teams ==
=== Stadia and locations ===
Locations of the 2015 Chile Primera División teams.

Team	City	Stadium
Antofagasta	Antofagasta	Regional de Antofagasta
Audax Italiano	Santiago	Municipal de La Florida
Barnechea	Santiago	San Carlos de Apoquindo
Cobreloa	Calama	Municipal de Calama
Cobresal	El Salvador	El Cobre
Colo-Colo	Santiago	Monumental David Arellano
Huachipato	Talcahuano	CAP
Iquique	Iquique	Tierra de Campeones
Ñublense	Chillán	Nelson Oyarzún
O'Higgins	Rancagua	El Teniente
Palestino	Santiago	Municipal de La Cisterna
San Marcos	Arica	Carlos Dittborn
Santiago Wanderers	Valparaíso	Elías Figueroa Brander
Unión Española	Santiago	Santa Laura
Unión La Calera	La Calera	Municipal Nicolás Chahuán
Universidad Católica	Santiago	San Carlos de Apoquindo
Universidad de Chile	Santiago	Nacional Julio Martínez Pradanos
Universidad de Concepción	Concepción	Estadio Municipal de Concepción

=== Personnel and kits ===
Team	Head coach	Captain	Kit manufacturer	Sponsors
Antofagasta	(Chile) José Cantillana	(Chile) Cristián Rojas	Training	Minera Escondida
Audax Italiano	(Chile) Jorge Pellicer	(Chile) Rafael Olarra	Dalponte	Ideal
Barnechea	(Chile) Francisco Bozán	(Argentina) Jorge Manduca	Mitre	MTS
Cobreloa	(Chile) Marco Antonio Figueroa	(Chile) Diego Silva	Lotto	Finning
Cobresal	(Argentina) Dalcio Giovagnoli	(Chile) Johan Fuentes	Lotto	PF
Colo-Colo	(Chile) Héctor Tapia	(Chile) Gonzalo Fierro	Under Armour	DirecTV
Huachipato	(Chile) Hugo Vilches	(Chile) Claudio Muñoz	Mitre	Campeón del Sur
Iquique	(Chile) Nelson Acosta	(Chile) Rodrigo Naranjo	Lotto	ZOFRI
Ñublense	(Chile) Fernando Díaz	(Uruguay) Mathías Riquero	Cafu	PF
O'Higgins	(Argentina) Pablo Sánchez	(Chile) Braulio Leal	New Balance	VTR
Palestino	(Argentina) Pablo Guede	(Chile) Leonardo Valencia	Training	Bank of Palestine
San Marcos	(Chile) Fernando Vergara	(Chile) Pedro Carrizo	Dalponte	Terminal Puerto Arica
Santiago Wanderers	(Chile) Emiliano Astorga	(Chile) Jorge Ormeño	Mitre	Terminal Pacifico Sur Valparaiso
Unión Española	(Chile) José Luis Sierra	(Chile) Gonzalo Villagra	Joma	Universidad SEK
Unión La Calera	(Argentina) Ariel Pereyra	(Chile) Mario Berríos	Training	PF
Universidad Católica	(Chile) Mario Salas	(Chile) Cristian Álvarez	Umbro	DirecTV
Universidad de Chile	(Uruguay) Martín Lasarte	(Chile) José Rojas	Adidas	Claro
Universidad de Concepción	(Chile) Ronald Fuentes	(Chile) Gabriel Vargas	Dalponte	PF

== Torneo Apertura ==
=== Standings ===
Pos	Team	Pld	W	D	L	GF	GA	GD	Pts	Qualification
1	Universidad de Chile	17	14	2	1	37	13	+24	44	2015 Copa Libertadores group stage
2	Santiago Wanderers	17	14	1	2	31	14	+17	43	Apertura Liguilla
3	Colo-Colo	17	13	2	2	34	11	+23	41	
4	Palestino	17	10	1	6	28	21	+7	31	Apertura Liguilla
5	Huachipato	17	8	2	7	30	25	+5	26	Apertura Liguilla
6	Unión Española	17	8	1	8	22	24	−2	25	Apertura Liguilla
7	Audax Italiano	17	6	5	6	26	21	+5	23	
8	O'Higgins	17	6	5	6	27	25	+2	23	
9	Unión La Calera	17	6	4	7	25	22	+3	22	
10	Barnechea	17	6	2	9	16	26	−10	20	
11	Ñublense	17	5	4	8	21	29	−8	19	
12	Universidad de Concepción	17	4	6	7	18	23	−5	18	
13	San Marcos	17	5	3	9	12	21	−9	18	
14	Universidad Católica	17	5	2	10	20	25	−5	17	
15	Cobresal	17	4	5	8	24	30	−6	17	
16	Iquique	17	3	7	7	22	31	−9	16	
17	Antofagasta	17	4	4	9	13	25	−12	16	
18	Cobreloa	17	3	2	12	19	39	−20	11	

=== Results ===
Home \ Away	ANT	AUD	COB	CSL	CC	BAR	IQUI	HUA	ÑUB	OHI	PAL	SMA	SW	UE	ULC	UC	UCH	UDC
Antofagasta		0–0	2–1			1–1	1–0	2–2	2–0	2–1			0–2				0–3	
Audax Italiano				2–2		3–1	2–1		0–1			3–0		0–1	2–2		2–3	4–1
Cobreloa		0–1				1–2	3–3		4–2				1–2		1–1		0–4	0–2
Cobresal	1–1		2–1		0–1			2–2		3–1	0–1	0–0		1–3		0–1		
Colo-Colo	4–0	2–1					2–0		0–0	2–3				2–0			2–0	
Barnechea					0–3			3–0		1–2		1–0		1–0	0–3	1–0		
Iquique				2–2		1–0			1–1	0–0	2–4						2–2	1–1
Huachipato		1–2	2–0		1–3		5–0		3–0		2–0		4–0	1–3	0–4			
Ñublense				2–3		0–1				1–1		2–1		3–1		2–1		2–1
O'Higgins		1–1	4–1					3–0			0–1	3–1		1–3			1–3	2–2
Palestino	3–1	1–0	1–2		1–3	2–0			2–2				0–1		3–2	2–1		
San Marcos	1–0		0–1		1–1						1–0			2–1	2–1			0–0
Santiago Wanderers		2–2		4–1	2–0	3–0	2–0		2–1	1–0		2–1		1–0				
Unión Española	1–0		2–1				2–5				2–5				2–0	1–0	0–1	0–0
Unión La Calera	3–1			2–1	0–2		1–1		3–2	1–2						1–0		
Universidad Católica	1–0	2–1	5–1		1–2			0–3		2–2		2–0	0–1					2–2
Universidad de Chile				3–1		1–1		2–1			2–1	2–0	3–2		1–0	3–0		1–0
Universidad de Concepción	1–0			3–2	0–1	3–2		0–1			0–1		1–3		1–1			

Updated to match(es) played on November 2014. Source: Soccerway.com
Legend: Blue = home team win; Yellow = draw; Red = away team win.

=== Apertura Liguilla ===
Following the conclusion of the regular season, the teams placed 2nd to 5th qualify for the Liguilla in order to determine qualifying spots for the following international tournaments:

- Winner qualified for 2015 Copa Libertadores first stage (Chile 3).
- Runner-up qualified for 2015 Copa Sudamericana first stage (Chile 4).

Colo-Colo, placed 3rd, was ineligible to compete due to having already qualified for Copa Libertadores as champions of the previous tournament.

Semifinals
1	Santiago Wanderers	4	2	6
4	Unión Española	2	3	5
2	Palestino	3	3	6
3	Huachipato	1	0	1

Final
1	Santiago Wanderers	1	1	2
2	Palestino	3	6	9

==== Semifinals ====
10 December 2014 1st Leg	Unión Española	2–4	Santiago Wanderers	Estadio Santa Laura-Universidad SEK, Santiago
19:00	Salom 4', 78'; Navarrete (red card) 78'	Report	Fernández 24'; Gutiérrez 51'; Medel 60'; Luna 81'	Attendance: 3,304; Referee: Carlos Ulloa

14 December 2014 2nd Leg	Santiago Wanderers	2–3	Unión Española	Estadio Elías Figueroa Brander, Valparaíso
18:30	Gutiérrez 45+2'; Luna 51' (pen.)	Report	Currimilla 16'; Barriga 82' (o.g.); Salom 90+2'	Attendance: 11,023; Referee: Julio Bascuñán

Santiago Wanderers won 6–5 on aggregate.

10 December 2014 1st Leg	Huachipato	1–3	Palestino	Estadio CAP, Talcahuano
21:15	Vilches 46'	Report	Silva 16'; Ramos 45+2' (pen.); Valencia 90+2'	Attendance: 3,728; Referee: Roberto Tobar

14 December 2014 2nd Leg	Palestino	3–0	Huachipato	Estadio Municipal de La Cisterna, Santiago
16:00	Márquez 20'; Lanaro 52', 67'	Report		Attendance: 2,343; Referee: Claudio Puga

Palestino won 6–1 on aggregate.

==== Finals ====
17 December 2014 1st Leg	Palestino	3–1	Santiago Wanderers	Estadio Municipal de La Cisterna, Santiago
16:30	Valencia 16', 68'; Valenzuela 33'	Report	Prieto 87'	Attendance: 1,575; Referee: Jorge Osorio

21 December 2014 2nd Leg	Santiago Wanderers	1–6	Palestino	Estadio Elías Figueroa Brander, Valparaíso
18:30	Fernández 24'; Luna (red card) 26'	Report	Contreras 4'; Riquelme 6'; Silva (red card) 29'; Ramos 44'; Lanaro 48'; Valencia 57', 70'	Attendance: 9,436; Referee: Carlos Ulloa

Palestino won 9–2 on aggregate and qualified for the 2015 Copa Libertadores. Santiago Wanderers, as runners-up, qualified for the 2015 Copa Sudamericana.

== Torneo Clausura ==
=== Standings ===
Pos	Team	Pld	W	D	L	GF	GA	GD	Pts	Qualification
1	Cobresal	17	10	4	3	29	20	+9	34	2016 Copa Libertadores second stage
2	Colo-Colo	17	10	2	5	32	21	+11	32	
3	Huachipato	17	9	4	4	29	28	+1	31	
4	Universidad Católica	17	8	5	4	40	31	+9	29	Advance to Clausura Liguilla
5	Unión La Calera	17	8	3	6	33	26	+7	27	Advance to Clausura Liguilla
6	Universidad de Concepción	17	8	3	6	27	26	+1	27	
7	Universidad de Chile	17	8	2	7	36	27	+9	26	
8	San Marcos	17	6	6	5	26	19	+7	24	Advance to Clausura Liguilla
9	O'Higgins	17	6	6	5	21	23	−2	24	Advance to Clausura Liguilla
10	Unión Española	17	6	5	6	20	23	−3	23	
11	Cobreloa	17	6	4	7	22	23	−1	22	
12	Audax Italiano	17	5	6	6	23	24	−1	21	
13	Iquique	17	6	3	8	27	30	−3	21	
14	Antofagasta	17	6	2	9	25	27	−2	20	
15	Ñublense	17	5	4	8	19	21	−2	19	
16	Palestino	17	5	4	8	26	34	−8	19	
17	Santiago Wanderers	17	4	5	8	21	26	−5	17	
18	Barnechea	17	2	2	13	13	40	−27	8	

Updated to match(es) played on 2 March 2015. Source: https://www.soccerway.com/chile/liga-de-primera-2014-2015/results/

=== Results ===
Home \ Away	ANT	AUD	BAR	COB	CSL	CC	IQUI	HUA	ÑUB	OHI	PAL	SMA	SW	UE	ULC	UC	UCH	UDC
Antofagasta					2–0	1–2					1–2	0–2		1–2	3–4	2–3		0–1
Audax Italiano	1–1			1–0		0–1		0–0		3–0	1–2		2–1			0–0		
Barnechea	1–3	0–0		0–1			1–0		1–3		2–1		0–2				1–4	1–2
Cobreloa	3–1				1–3	0–4		6–0		0–0	3–0	1–0		1–1		1–3		
Cobresal		3–1	3–2				4–2		1–0				1–0		1–1		1–1	2–1
Colo-Colo			4–1		1–2			2–2			1–1	0–1	3–1		1–4	0–3		3–0
Iquique	1–2	1–0		0–0		3–2		1–2				4–1	2–1	0–1	2–1			
Huachipato	2–0		4–1		2–1					3–2		1–0				3–5	2–2	1–2
Ñublense	0–1	1–0		3–2		0–1	2–0	3–1			0–3		1–1		1–2			
O'Higgins	2–2		3–1		2–0	0–2	1–0		1–0				1–1		2–1	1–1		
Palestino					0–1		2–2			3–3		0–4		2–3			1–3	3–2
San Marcos		3–0	0–0		1–1				0–0	0–0			3–3			3–3	0–1	
Santiago Wanderers	0–2			0–1				0–1			0–3				4–2	2–0	3–2	0–0
Unión Española		0–2	2–1		1–1	1–3		0–1	1–1	1–2		1–2	2–2					
Unión La Calera		0–0	3–0	0–0	1–1			0–1			4–0	1–4		2–0				2–0
Universidad Católica			5–0		2–4		3–3		2–1		3–2			0–0	4–2		2–4	
Universidad de Chile	1–3	2–3		4–0		1–2	2–3		2–1	3–0				1–2				
Universidad de Concepción		2–2		3–2			3–1		2–2	2–1		3–2		1–2		2–0	1–2	

Updated to match(es) played on 2 March 2015. Source: Soccerway.com
Legend: Blue = home team win; Yellow = draw; Red = away team win.

=== Clausura Liguilla ===
Following the conclusion of the regular season, the teams placed 2nd to 5th qualified for the Liguilla in order to determine the "Chile 3" spot to the 2015 Copa Sudamericana. However, teams that already played the 2015 Copa Libertadores (from second stage onwards) and the winners of Copa Chile are ineligible to compete in the Liguilla. These teams are the following:

- Colo-Colo (2nd), played in Copa Libertadores.
- Huachipato (3rd), already qualified for the Copa Sudamericana through the aggregate table.
- Universidad de Concepción (6th), winners of Copa Chile.
- Universidad de Chile (7th), played in Copa Libertadores.

Semifinals
1	Universidad Católica	2	3	5
4	O'Higgins	2	1	3
2	San Marcos	1	1	2 (4)
3	Unión La Calera	1	1	2 (2)

Final
1	Universidad Católica	1	3	4 (6)
2	San Marcos	3	1	4 (5)

==== Semifinals ====
9 May 2015 1st Leg	O'Higgins	2–2	Universidad Católica	Estadio El Teniente, Rancagua
15:30	Calandria 81', 84' (pen.)	Report	Muñoz 10'; Llanos 89'	Attendance: 6,615; Referee: Patricio Polic

13 May 2015 2nd Leg	Universidad Católica	3–1	O'Higgins	Estadio San Carlos de Apoquindo, Santiago
20:00	Gutiérrez 35'; Cordero 47'; Ríos 68' (pen.)	Report	Pinto 11'	Attendance: 7,407; Referee: Roberto Tobar

Universidad Católica won 5–3 on aggregate.

9 May 2015 1st Leg	San Marcos	1–1	Unión La Calera	Estadio Carlos Dittborn, Arica
21:00	Harbottle 53'	Report	Tévez 90+7'	Attendance: 5,000; Referee: Carlos Ulloa

14 May 2015 2nd Leg	Unión La Calera	1–1 (2–4 p)	San Marcos	Estadio Lucio Fariña, Quillota
20:00	Vidal 58'	Report	Ramos 65'	Attendance: 4,000; Referee: Jorge Osorio
	Penalties
	González (penalty scored); Rosales (penalty scored); Costa (penalty missed); Tévez (penalty missed)		(penalty missed) Harbottle; (penalty scored) Ramos; (penalty scored) Rivera; (penalty scored) Sandoval; (penalty scored) Lobos

2–2 on aggregate. San Marcos won 4–2 on penalties.

==== Finals ====
17 May 2015 1st Leg	San Marcos	3–1	Universidad Católica	Estadio Carlos Dittborn, Arica
16:00	Ramos 14', 49'; Oyarzún 39'	Report	Llanos 90+1'	Attendance: 7,004; Referee: Claudio Puga

20 May 2015 2nd Leg	Universidad Católica	3–1 (6–5 p)	San Marcos	Estadio San Carlos de Apoquindo, Santiago
20:00	Llanos 51'; Rojas 59'; Pulgar 70'	Report	Oberman 90+6'	Attendance: 8,966; Referee: Roberto Tobar
	Penalties
	González (penalty scored); Manzano (penalty missed); Rojas (penalty missed); Pulgar (penalty scored); Cordero (penalty scored); Biskupović (penalty scored); Magnasco (penalty scored); Maripán (penalty scored)		(penalty missed) Harbottle; (penalty scored) Sandoval; (penalty missed) Oberman; (penalty scored) Ramos; (penalty scored) Lobos; (penalty scored) Medina; (penalty scored) Coronado; (penalty missed) Oyarzún

4–4 on aggregate. Universidad Católica won 6–5 on penalties and qualified for the 2015 Copa Sudamericana.

== Aggregate table ==
Pos	Team	Pld	W	D	L	GF	GA	GD	Pts	Qualification
1	Colo-Colo	34	23	4	7	66	32	+34	73	
2	Universidad de Chile	34	22	4	8	73	40	+33	70	
3	Santiago Wanderers	34	18	6	10	52	40	+12	60	2015 Copa Sudamericana first stage
4	Huachipato	34	17	6	11	59	53	+6	57	2015 Copa Sudamericana first stage
5	Cobresal	34	14	9	11	53	50	+3	51	
6	Palestino	34	15	5	14	54	55	−1	50	
7	Unión La Calera	34	14	7	13	58	48	+10	49	
8	Unión Española	34	14	6	14	42	47	−5	48	
9	O'Higgins	34	12	11	11	48	48	0	47	
10	Universidad Católica	34	13	7	14	60	56	+4	46	2015 Copa Sudamericana first stage
11	Universidad de Concepción	34	12	9	13	45	49	−4	45	2015 Copa Sudamericana first stage
12	Audax Italiano	34	11	11	12	49	45	+4	44	
13	San Marcos	34	11	9	14	38	40	−2	42	
14	Ñublense	34	10	8	16	40	50	−10	38	
15	Iquique	34	9	10	15	49	61	−12	37	
16	Antofagasta	34	10	6	18	38	52	−14	36	
17	Cobreloa	34	9	6	19	41	62	−21	33	
18	Barnechea	34	8	4	22	29	66	−37	28	

== Relegation ==
Pos	Team	2013–14 Pts	2014–15 Pts	Total Pts	Total Pld	Avg	Relegation
1	Colo-Colo	66	73	139	68	2.044	
2	Universidad Católica	72	45	118	68	1.735	
3	Universidad de Chile	47	70	117	68	1.721	
4	O'Higgins	69	47	116	68	1.706	
5	Palestino	53	50	103	68	1.515	
6	Santiago Wanderers	40	60	100	68	1.471	
7	Unión Española	50	48	98	68	1.441	
8	Cobresal	45	51	96	68	1.412	
9	Huachipato	38	57	95	68	1.397	
10	Universidad de Concepción	49	45	94	68	1.382	
11	Iquique	51	37	88	68	1.294	
12	Unión La Calera	35	49	84	68	1.235	
13	San Marcos	—	42	42	34	1.235	
14	Audax Italiano	36	44	80	68	1.176	
15	Antofagasta	44	36	80	68	1.176	
16	Ñublense	41	38	79	68	1.162	Relegation to Primera B
17	Cobreloa	45	30	75	68	1.103	Relegation to Primera B
18	Barnechea	—	28	28	34	0.824	Relegation to Primera B
