= 2017 Sporting Cristal season =

Football league season

Sporting Cristal
2017 season
- President: Federico Cúneo
- Coach: José del Solar
- Stadium: Alberto Gallardo, Lima
- Torneo Descentralizado: Torneo Apertura: Seventh (7°); Torneo Clausura: Nineth (9°); Aggregate Table: Eighth (8°); Eighth National (8°)
- Torneo de Verano: Third (3°) (Group A)
- Copa Libertadores: Second stage
- Top goalscorer: League: All: Irven Ávila (22)
Home colours	Away colours	Third colours

The 2017 Sporting Cristal season were the Sixty-Second (62.º) of the club from its foundation in 1955, Sixty-Two (62) participations consecutives in the top-flight of Peruvian Primera División (of 101 Editions) with denomination Torneo Descentralizado. In Previous Season the club qualified as Champions National 1st Place of the 2016 Torneo Descentralizado.

Sporting Cristal were a of sixteen (16) clubs in the Fifty-Second edition (52.º) Torneo Descentralizado, the competition most important of the Peruvian football. The club played the Peruvian Primera División and Copa Libertadores for fifth consecutive year and played for the Thirty-Third (33rd) Time.

== Kits ==
Supplier: Adidas

Sponsor(s): Cerveza Cristal

== Players ==
Note: Flags indicate national team as defined under FIFA eligibility rules; some limited exceptions apply. Players may hold more than one non-FIFA nationality.

No.	Pos.	Nation	Player
1	GK	PER	Carlos Grados
3	DF	PER	Marcos López
4	DF	PER	Gianfranco Chávez
5	MF	PER	Pedro Aquino
6	MF	PER	Alexis Rojas
7	MF	ARG	Horacio Calcaterra
8	MF	URU	Gabriel Costa
10	MF	PER	Joel Sánchez
11	FW	PER	Irven Ávila
12	GK	CHI	Mauricio Viana
15	DF	PER	Renzo Garcés

No.	Pos.	Nation	Player
17	MF	PER	Ray Sandoval
21	MF	PER	Josepmir Ballón
22	DF	PER	Jair Céspedes
23	MF	URU	Jorge Cazulo
24	FW	PER	Fernando Pacheco
25	MF	PER	Martín Távara
27	MF	PER	Carlos Lobatón (Captain)
28	DF	PER	Edinson Chávez
29	DF	PER	Luis Abram
59	FW	ARG	Christian Ortiz

== Competitions ==
=== Overall ===
Competition	Started round	Final position / round	First match	Last match
Torneo Descentralizado	Torneo de Verano	8th	Feb 5	Dec 3
Copa Libertadores	Second stage	Second stage	Mar 9	May 23

=== Torneo Descentralizado ===
==== Torneo de Verano ====
===== Group stage =====
Pos	Team	Pld	W	D	L	GF	GA	GD	Pts	Qualification	MEL	SRO	CRI	CAN	USM	AYA	UCO	AAS
1	Melgar	14	7	6	1	20	12	+8	27	Advance to Finals	—	—	2–2	—	—	—	—	—
2	Sport Rosario	14	6	6	2	13	7	+6	24		—	—	2–1	—	—	—	—	—
3	Sporting Cristal	14	6	4	4	27	16	+11	22		2–0	1–0	—	1–4	3–0	4–0	0–0	4–1
4	Cantolao	14	5	4	5	16	15	+1	19		—	—	2–0	—	—	—	—	—
5	Universidad San Martín	14	5	2	7	18	19	−1	17		—	—	1–0	—	—	—	—	—
6	Ayacucho	14	4	4	6	18	21	−3	16		—	—	2–2	—	—	—	—	—
7	Unión Comercio	14	4	4	6	16	20	−4	16		—	—	2–2	—	—	—	—	—
8	Alianza Atlético	14	3	2	9	10	28	−18	11		—	—	0–5	—	—	—	—	—

Source: ADFP
Legend: Blue = home team win; Yellow = draw; Red = away team win.
Rules for classification: 1) points; 2) goal difference; 3) goals scored; 4) draw.

==== Torneo Apertura ====
Pos	Team	Pld	W	D	L	GF	GA	GD	Pts
6	Deportivo Municipal	15	6	5	4	17	13	+4	23
7	Sporting Cristal	15	6	5	4	22	20	+2	23
8	Sport Rosario	15	5	6	4	16	18	−2	21

===== Results =====
Home \ Away	AAS	ALI	AYA	CAN	COM	JA	MEL	MUN	RGA	SHU	SRO	CRI	UCO	USM	UTC	UNI
Alianza Atlético	—	—	—	—	—	—	—	—	—	—	—	2–3	—	—	—	—
Alianza Lima	—	—	—	—	—	—	—	—	—	—	—	—	—	—	—	—
Ayacucho	—	—	—	—	—	—	—	—	—	—	—	—	—	—	—	—
Cantolao	—	—	—	—	—	—	—	—	—	—	—	1–1	—	—	—	—
Comerciantes Unidos	—	—	—	—	—	—	—	—	—	—	—	4–2	—	—	—	—
Juan Aurich	—	—	—	—	—	—	—	—	—	—	—	—	—	—	—	—
Melgar	—	—	—	—	—	—	—	—	—	—	—	4–1	—	—	—	—
Deportivo Municipal	—	—	—	—	—	—	—	—	—	—	—	—	—	—	—	—
Real Garcilaso	—	—	—	—	—	—	—	—	—	—	—	1–0	—	—	—	—
Sport Huancayo	—	—	—	—	—	—	—	—	—	—	—	—	—	—	—	—
Sport Rosario	—	—	—	—	—	—	—	—	—	—	—	1–3	—	—	—	—
Sporting Cristal	—	0–1	2–0	—	—	0–0	—	2–2	—	2–0	—	—	—	2–1	1–0	1–1
Unión Comercio	—	—	—	—	—	—	—	—	—	—	—	2–2	—	—	—	—
Universidad San Martín	—	—	—	—	—	—	—	—	—	—	—	—	—	—	—	—
UTC	—	—	—	—	—	—	—	—	—	—	—	—	—	—	—	—
Universitario	—	—	—	—	—	—	—	—	—	—	—	—	—	—	—	—

Source: ADFP - official fixture
Legend: Blue = home team win; Yellow = draw; Red = away team win.

==== Torneo Clausura ====
Pos	Team	Pld	W	D	L	GF	GA	GD	Pts
8	UTC	15	6	2	7	17	17	0	20
9	Sporting Cristal	15	5	3	7	27	24	+3	18
10	Juan Aurich	15	5	2	8	22	28	−6	17

===== Results =====
Home \ Away	AAS	ALI	AYA	CAN	COM	JA	MEL	MUN	RGA	SHU	SRO	CRI	UCO	USM	UTC	UNI
Alianza Atlético	—	—	—	—	—	—	—	—	—	—	—	—	—	—	—	—
Alianza Lima	—	—	—	—	—	—	—	—	—	—	—	2–1	—	—	—	—
Ayacucho	—	—	—	—	—	—	—	—	—	—	—	5–3	—	—	—	—
Cantolao	—	—	—	—	—	—	—	—	—	—	—	—	—	—	—	—
Comerciantes Unidos	—	—	—	—	—	—	—	—	—	—	—	—	—	—	—	—
Juan Aurich	—	—	—	—	—	—	—	—	—	—	—	2–1	—	—	—	—
Melgar	—	—	—	—	—	—	—	—	—	—	—	—	—	—	—	—
Deportivo Municipal	—	—	—	—	—	—	—	—	—	—	—	3–2	—	—	—	—
Real Garcilaso	—	—	—	—	—	—	—	—	—	—	—	—	—	—	—	—
Sport Huancayo	—	—	—	—	—	—	—	—	—	—	—	2–1	—	—	—	—
Sport Rosario	—	—	—	—	—	—	—	—	—	—	—	—	—	—	—	—
Sporting Cristal	4–0	—	—	3–0	2–2	—	1–2	—	0–0	—	2–1	—	2–0	—	—	—
Unión Comercio	—	—	—	—	—	—	—	—	—	—	—	—	—	—	—	—
Universidad San Martín	—	—	—	—	—	—	—	—	—	—	—	2–3	—	—	—	—
UTC	—	—	—	—	—	—	—	—	—	—	—	1–0	—	—	—	—
Universitario	—	—	—	—	—	—	—	—	—	—	—	2–2	—	—	—	—

Source: ADFP - official fixture
Legend: Blue = home team win; Yellow = draw; Red = away team win.

==== Aggregate table ====
Pos	Team	Pld	W	D	L	GF	GA	GD	Pts	Qualification
7	Sport Rosario	44	16	17	11	49	42	+7	65	
8	Sporting Cristal	44	17	12	15	76	60	+16	64	Qualification to Copa Sudamericana first stage
9	Deportivo Municipal	44	16	12	16	53	49	+4	60	

=== Copa Libertadores ===
Pos	Team	Pld	W	D	L	GF	GA	GD	Pts
1	Santos	6	3	3	0	11	4	+7	12
2	The Strongest	6	2	3	1	9	5	+4	9
3	Santa Fe	6	2	2	2	8	6	+2	8
4	Sporting Cristal	6	0	2	4	2	15	−13	2

9 March 2017	Sporting Cristal (Peru)	1–1	(Brazil) Santos	Estadio Nacional, Lima
19:45 UTC−5	Cazulo 13'	Report	Thiago Maia 66'	Attendance: 20,000; Referee: José Argote (Venezuela)

16 March 2017	Santa Fe (Colombia)	3–0	(Peru) Sporting Cristal	Estadio El Campín, Bogotá
19:45 UTC−5	Arango 9'; Gómez 77', 90+1'	Report		Attendance: 17,464; Referee: Carlos Orbe (Ecuador)

18 April 2017	Sporting Cristal (Peru)	0–0	(Bolivia) The Strongest	Estadio Nacional, Lima
19:45 UTC−5		Report		Attendance: 10,000; Referee: Mario Díaz de Vivar (Paraguay)

4 May 2017	The Strongest (Bolivia)	5–1	(Peru) Sporting Cristal	Estadio Hernando Siles, La Paz
18:30 UTC−4	Alonso 18' (pen.), 36'; Chumacero 30'; Martelli 61'; Veizaga 70'	Report	D. Bejarano 52' (o.g.)	Attendance: 14,000; Referee: Mauro Vigliano (Argentina)

17 May 2017	Sporting Cristal (Peru)	0–2	(Colombia) Santa Fe	Estadio Nacional, Lima
17:30 UTC−5		Report	Arango 19'; Plata 90+1'	Attendance: 5,000; Referee: Néstor Pitana (Argentina)

23 May 2017	Santos (Brazil)	4–0	(Peru) Sporting Cristal	Estádio Urbano Caldeira, Santos
21:45 UTC−3	David Braz 19', 71'; Ricardo Oliveira 22'; Vitor Bueno 66'	Report		Attendance: 6,632; Referee: José Méndez (Paraguay)

== See also ==
- Club Sporting Cristal
- 2017 Torneo Descentralizado
