= Vehicle registration plates of Easter Island =

Easter Island and Robinson Crusoe Island require their residents to register their motor vehicles and display vehicle registration plates. Both had plates with the provincial name (I. de Pascua for Isla de Pascua and J. Fernández for Juan Fernández Islands) until 1984. Since 1984, plates are Chilean standard plates without the provincial name.

Image	First issued	Design	Serial format	Serials issued	Notes
		Red on white	ABC 123		
		Blue on orange	ABC 123		
