= Jorge Luna =

Jorge Luna may refer to:

- Jorge Luna (Argentine footballer) (born 1986)
- Jorge Luna (Venezuelan footballer) (born 1994)
