= Gabriel Sandoval =

Chilean footballer (born 1984)

Personal information
- Full name: Gabriel Eduardo Sandoval Alarcón
- Date of birth: 13 March 1984 (age 42)
- Place of birth: Lanco, Chile
- Height: 1.70 m (5 ft 7 in)
- Position: Midfielder

Youth career
- Huachipato

Senior career*
Years	Team	Apps	(Gls)
2002–2014	Huachipato	329	(18)
2014–2015	San Marcos	35	(0)
2015–2016	Unión Española	29	(0)
2016–2019	Deportes Antofagasta	72	(3)
2019	→ Cobreloa (loan)	10	(0)
2020–2021	Rangers	13	(0)
2021	Independiente Cauquenes	20	(0)
2022	Iberia	17	(0)
Total		525	(21)
- * Club domestic league appearances and goals

Gabriel Eduardo Sandoval Alarcón (born 13 March 1984), is a Chilean former professional footballer who played as a midfielder.

== Career ==
He was Huachipato record appearance holder, with 329 matches played, until 2026, when he was surpassed by Claudio Sepúlveda.

He retired at the end of the 2022 season as a player of Iberia in the Chilean Segunda División.

== Career statistics ==
As of match played on 18 March 2018

Appearances and goals by club, season and competition
Club	Season	League			Cup		League Cup		Other		Total	
Club	Season	Division	Apps	Goals	Apps	Goals	Apps	Goals	Apps	Goals	Apps	Goals
Huachipato	2009	Primera División of Chile	25	1	0	0	—				25	1
Huachipato	2010	Primera División of Chile	30	1	1	0	—				31	1
Huachipato	2011	Primera División of Chile	33	2	2	2	—				35	4
Huachipato	2012	Primera División of Chile	33	5	5	0	—				38	5
Huachipato	2013	Primera División of Chile	13	0	9	0	—		5	0	27	0
Huachipato	2013–14	Primera División of Chile	27	1	0	0	—				27	1
Huachipato	Total		161	10	17	2	0	0	5	0	183	12
San Marcos	2014–15	Primera División of Chile	35	0	3	0	—				38	0
Unión Española	2015–16	Primera División of Chile	29	0	10	0	—				39	0
Antofagasta	2016–17	Chilean Primera División	20	2	2	0	—				22	2
Antofagasta	2017	Chilean Primera División	12	0	2	0	—				14	0
Antofagasta	2018	Chilean Primera División	29	1	0	0	—				29	1
Antofagasta	Total		61	3	4	0	0	0	0	0	65	3
Career totals			286	13	34	2	0	0	5	0	325	15

== Honours ==
Huachipato

- Clausura Tournament: 2012
