= Vehicle registration plates of Chile =

Republic of Chile
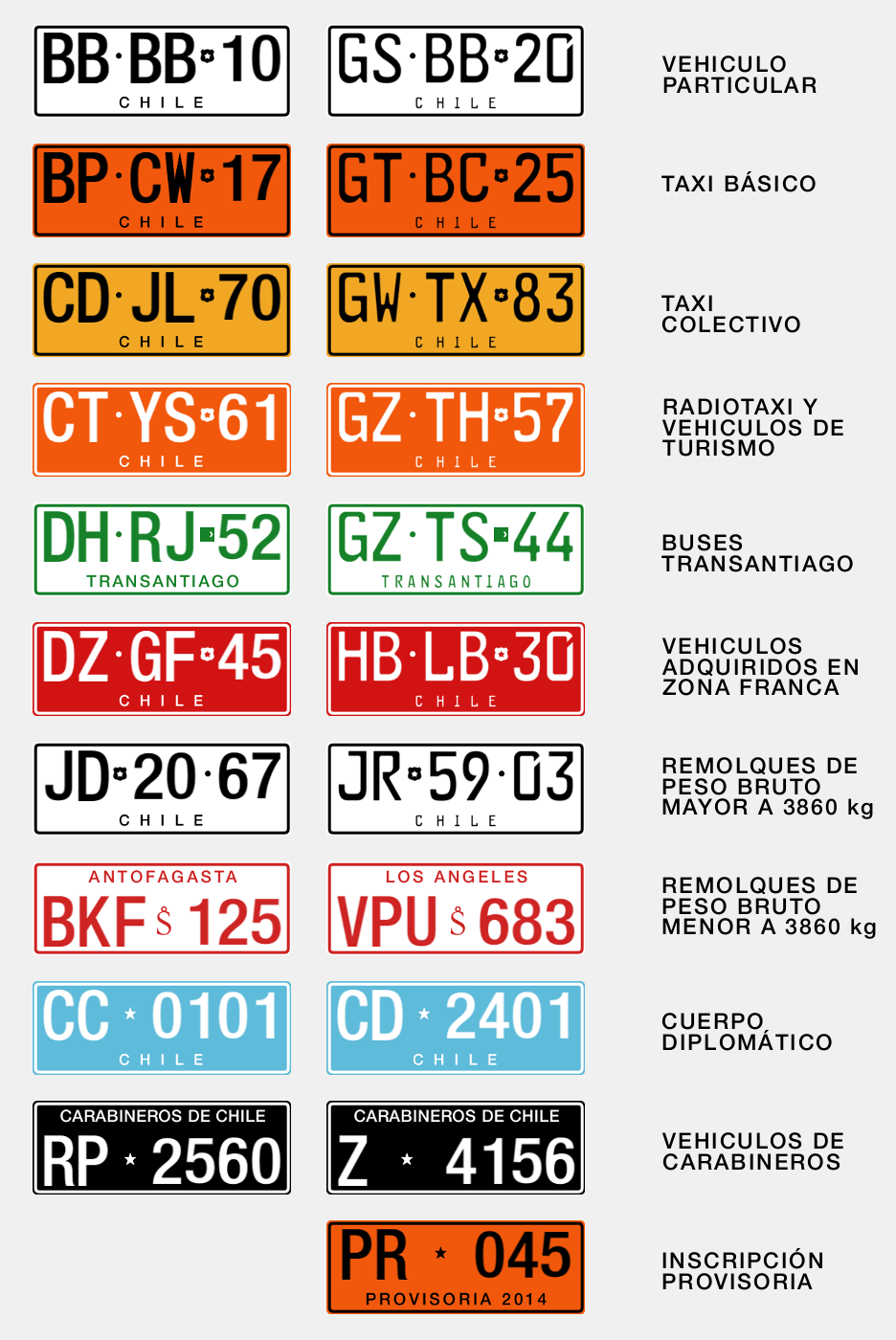
- New Chilean license plates (from 2014)
- Country: Chile
- Country code: RCH

Current series
- Size: 360 mm × 130 mm 14.2 in × 5.1 in
- Serial format: AB CD 12
- Colour (front): Black on white
- Colour (rear): Black on white

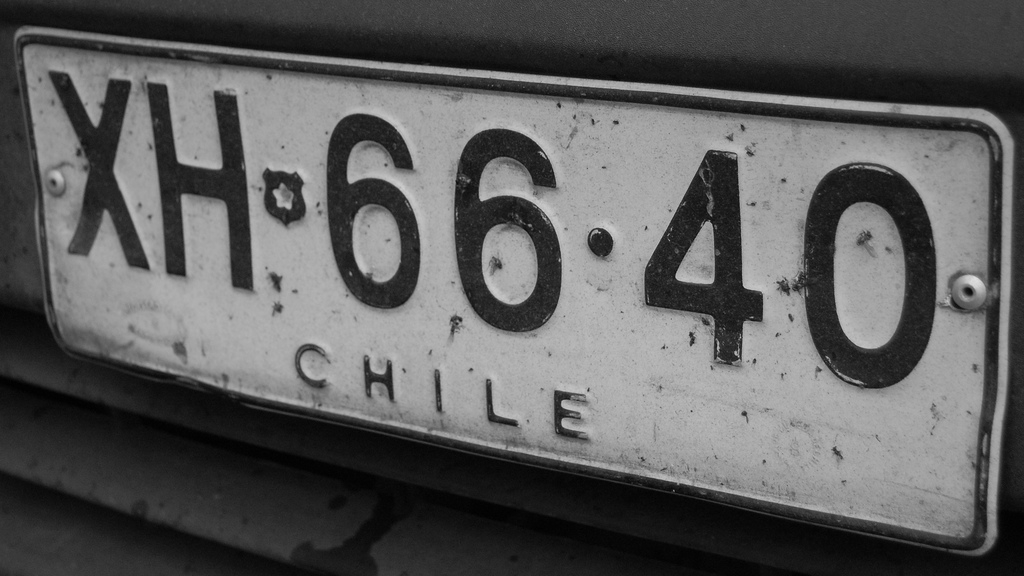
Old Chilean license plate (until 2007)

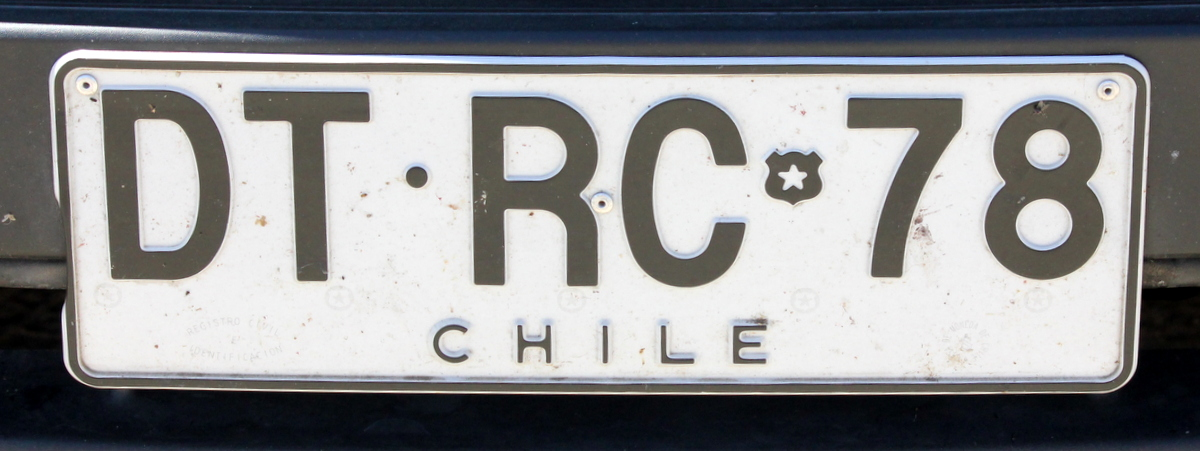
New Chilean license plate (until 2014)

Chile requires its residents to register their motor vehicles and display vehicle registration plates called patentes.

The current vehicle registration plates also are officially known as PPU (Placa Patente Única in Spanish). This designation was introduced in 1985 when vehicle registration was unified at the national level, ensuring that each vehicle would have a unique plate across the country.

== Formats ==
=== Old format (before December 31, 1984) ===
In the first registration system, vehicles were registered in each municipality, and this assigned a record independently, whose combinations were governed by a certain geographical distribution.

These license plates featured combinations of letters and numbers. They also varied in color depending on the type of vehicle, its use, or the year of issuance. The layout of the information (such as the municipality, combination, year, etc.) on the plate's lines (top or bottom) also varied according to each municipality's regulations.

The amounts of letters and numbers depend on the era:

Grades:

The vertical line / indicates the separation between the upper and lower line.
The separation indicated between the year and the symbol of the Mint is marked in such a way that the first written data is above the second. For example, if it is found as " · [70] " it indicates that the symbol is placed over the year.

- until 1940: Numbers only. Example:
  - 39 718 / 38 VALPARAISO PR
- 1940s and 1950s
  - for Santiago: Two letters and two numbers separated by a star, includes the year and type of vehicle. Example:
    - BC 98 / 58 SANTIAGO P (Individual)
  - for the rest of the country: Two letters and three numbers separated by a star (upper line), includes the year and type of vehicle (lower line). Examples:
    - TC 104 / 59 PUNTA ARENAS P (Individual)
    - YH 477 / 58 QUILICURA SW (Station wagon)

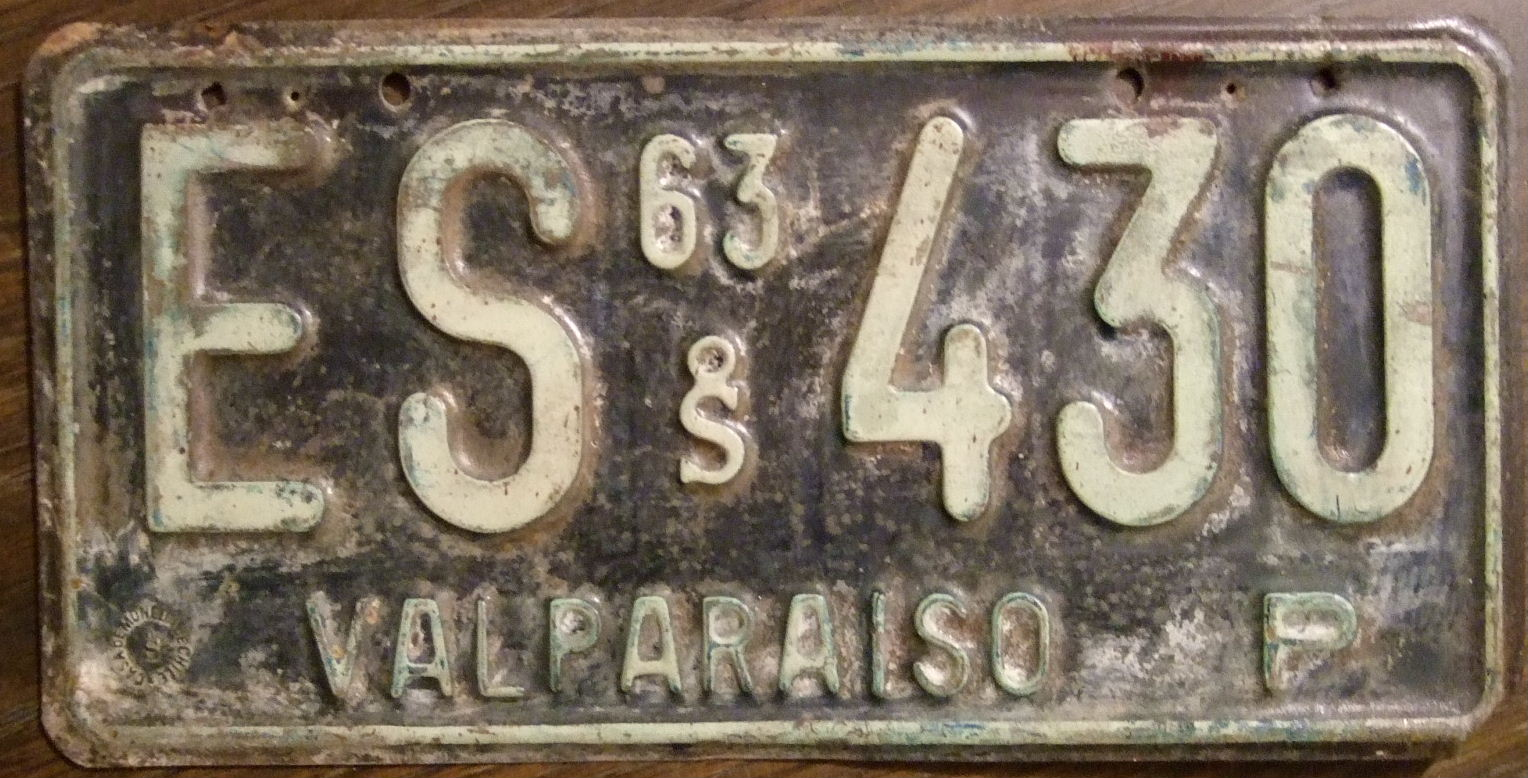
Chilean license plate from the commune of Valparaíso in 1963.

- 1960s
  - for Santiago: Two letters and two numbers separated by the symbol of the Casa de Moneda de Chile (S̊) and the year (bottom line). Example
    - SANTIAGO WAGONS / CZ ·[62] 85 (Station wagon)
  - for the rest of the country: Two letters and three numbers separated by the symbol of the House of Mint of Chile and the year (bottom line). Example:
    - FREIRE P / UL · [64] 274 (Individual)

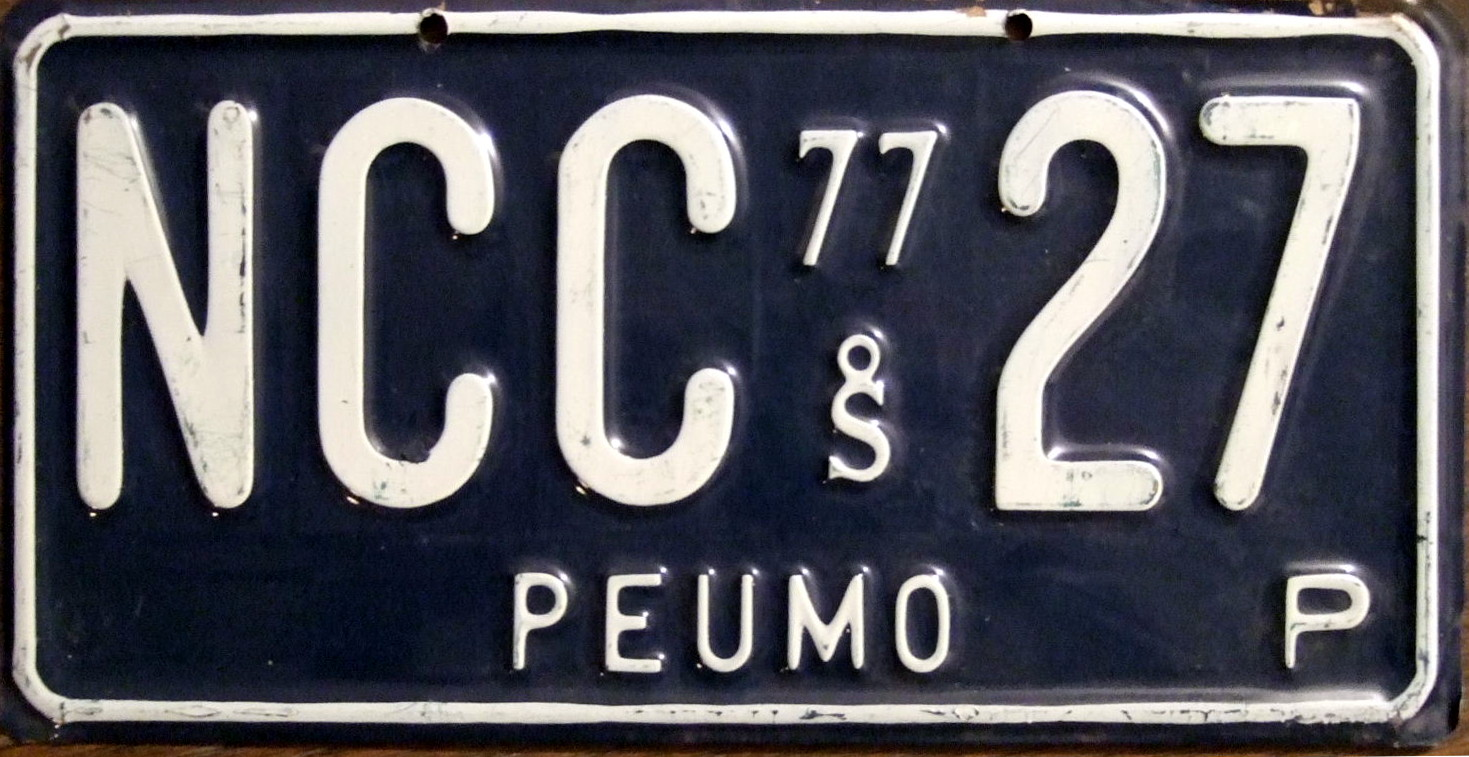
Chilean license plate from the commune of Peumo in 1977.

- 1970s
  - for Santiago: Two letters and two numbers separated by the year and the symbol of the Chilean Mint (top line). Example:
    - BG [71] · 51 / SANTIAGO P (Individual)
  - for the rest of the country: Two letters and three numbers or three letters and two numbers (without leading zeros), separated by the year and the symbol of the Chilean Mint. examples
    - BOD [73] · 37 / PUEBLO HUNDIDO C (Commercial)
    - QUILACO P / ULA · [78] 19 (Individual)
    - QUIRIHUE A / RBJ · [76] 4 (Taxi)
    - RL [75] · 409 / PROVIDENCIA C (Commercial)

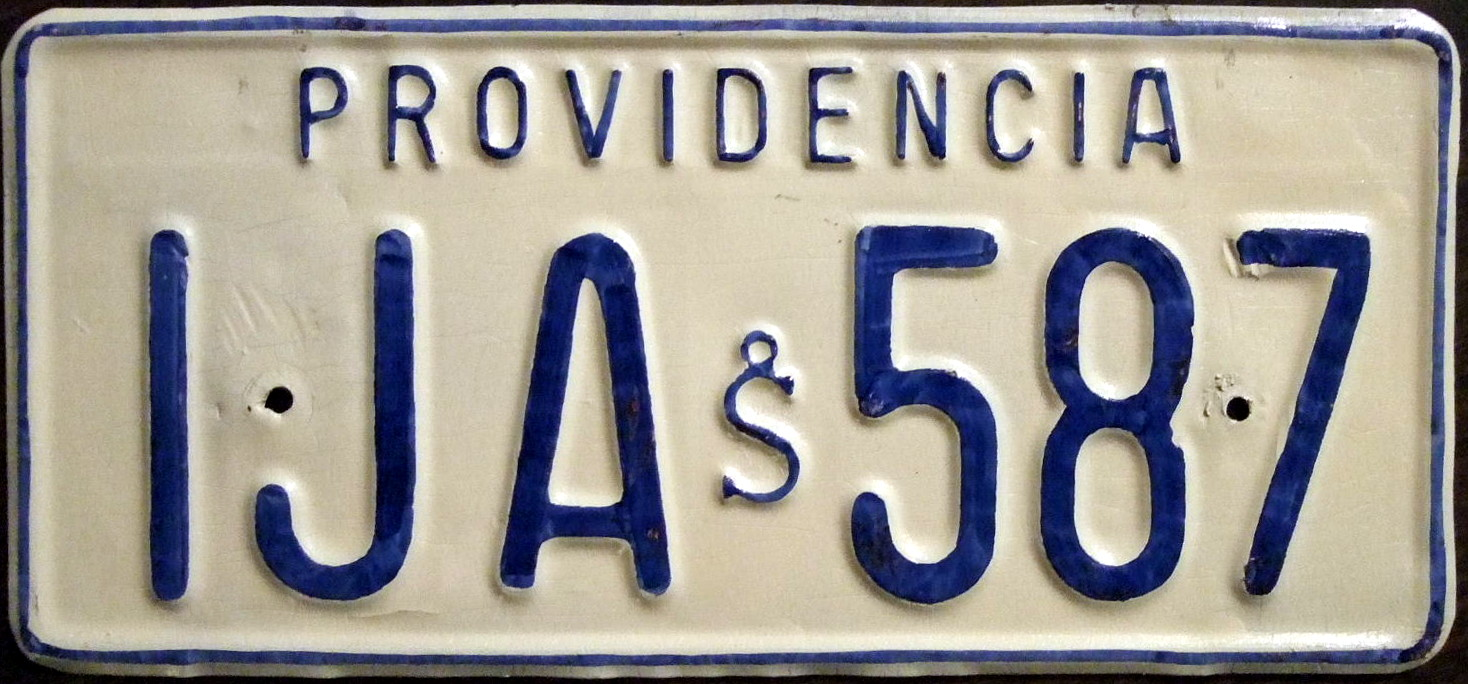
Chilean registration plate from the commune of Providencia from the early 1980s.

- 1980s
  - for the whole country: Three letters and three numbers separated by the symbol of the House of Mint of Chile. The colors determine the type of vehicle, although they also depend on the year. Example:
    - HDU 376 / SANTIAGO 81
    - XIC 791 / TEMUCO 81
    - GRAL. LAKES 82 / AAA 452
    - TJE 813 / TALCA 83
    - GVC 629 / RENCA 84

The initial letters between 1981 and 1984 were distributed as follows:

- Arica and Parinacota, and Tarapacá Regions: A.
- Antofagasta Region: B.
- Atacama and Coquimbo Regions: C.
- Valparaiso Region: D, E, F.
- Santiago Metropolitan Region: G, H, I, J, K, L, N, O, P, R.
- Libertador General Bernardo O'Higgins Region: S.
- Maule Region: T.
- Ñuble and Bio Bio Regions: U, V.
- Araucanía Region: X.
- Los Ríos and Los Lagos Regions: Y.
- Aysén del General Carlos Ibáñez del Campo and Magallanes Regions: Z.

=== 2 Letters and 4 Numbers Series (1985-2007) ===
The format consists of two letters and four numbers (AA·10-00); the letters are separated from the numbers by a simplified figure of the National Coat of Arms, while the numbers are grouped in two pairs of digits separated by a small circle. In addition to the numbers visible on the license plate, the registration additionally incorporates a verifier digit, the one that appears in the vehicle documentation.

The first letter can be one of the following 23 (with specific sequences following): A, B, C, E, F, G, H, D, K, L, N, P, R, S, T, U, V, X, Y, Z, W, and M. The letters I, Ñ, and Q were not used due to their resemblance to other letters, except in specific cases. Diplomatic vehicles may start with O. The letter J is now used for national trailer registration, replacing the old municipal system. The M series starts from MZ to MX in reverse order, allowing for 5,289,999 vehicles.

The first letter of the square allows to identify the year of the vehicle, although without exact precision and only from the letter D onwards. It is possible to observe vehicles whose plates begin with a letter that does not correspond to their year of registration, which may be because the vehicle was re-registered, or it was registered in an office where so few vehicles are registered that the combinations are delayed.

The second letter can be one of the following 23: A, B, C, D, E, F, G, H, I, J, K, L, N, P, R, S, T, U, V, X, Y, Z and W. M and W were left out for being too wide, Ñ for its resemblance to N, O for its resemblance to zero, and Q for its resemblance to O and zero. The I was only used in the combination DI.

In plates beginning with letters A, B, C, E, F, G and H, the sequential order is expressed in the second letter, for example, the sequential order of the first series was AA - BA - CA - EA, and so on; the next series was AB - CB - EB - FB, and so on. Initially, the letter D was not used at the beginning of the combination, due to its resemblance to zero, and the combinations BB, AD, AK, AY, GG and HZ were not used either, but until much later.

Also in the beginning there was a certain unintentional geographical distribution, some series assigned according to the table, for example:

Region	Assigned Combination
Arica-Parinacota	AA and BA
Tarapacá	AB and CB
Antofagasta	EB, FA, FB, GA and HA
Atacama	GB and HB
Coquimbo	AC, FD, GD and HD
Valparaíso	AH, CH, CX, EH, EX, FX and GY; FH (Los Andes); GH (San Felipe)
O'Higgins	AX (San Fernando); CJ (Codegua); EA, FV and GV (Rancagua)
Maule	BC, ER, ET, FE, FT, GE, and HS
Ñuble & Bío-Bío	EU, FF and HF; EC and GF (Chillán); AF and GT (Talcahuano); BF, BU, EF, HE and HT (Concepción)
Araucanía	FU, GC, GU and HU
Los Ríos & Los Lagos	AV, BG, BV, CV, EG, EV and HC
Aysén	BD (partial)
Magallanes	AE, BE, CE and CF (partial)
Metropolitana	Rest of original series (between AG and HY); CT (San Bernardo); EL (Santiago); GX (Paine); HH (Maipú); HR (Las Condes)

The combinations that begin with the letters A, B, C, E, F, G and H, were not issued following a correlative order, unlike what was done from 1990 (D) and until the end of the system. In 1990 plates began to be issued following a correlative order marked on the second letter, beginning with D: DA - DB - DD ( DC was not used), and so on. E, F, G, and H had already been used in the previous system and J had been discarded because it resembled I, so K was continued: KA - KB - KC - KD, etc. This order allows to identify, with moderate precision, the year of registration of the vehicle, for example, the letter S began to be issued from the end of 1997, the letter X corresponds to the middle of 2003, etc.

When the combinations reached ZZ in 2006, the system's lifespan was extended by incorporating the letters W and M, which were initially excluded due to their width. The sequence began with WA and progressed to WZ. Then, the second letter was used, starting from ZW and moving backward to KW. The M series was also introduced, with plates issued in reverse order from MZ to part of MX, which was the last combination issued under that system.

There is no certainty that (almost) all the combinations have been used.

The numbers start from 1000 (AA·10-00) and go up consecutively until they reach 9999 (AA·'99-99).

All license plates in Chile display the word CHILE at the bottom, except for Transantiago buses, which say TRANSANTIAGO, with a special symbol separating the letters from the numbers. Additionally, on the left side, the phrase REGISTRO CIVIL E IDENTIFICACION (CIVIL REGISTRY AND IDENTIFICATION) is inscribed in an oval, while on the right side, CASA DE MONEDA DE CHILE appears in a circle with its emblem. These inscriptions are embossed on the metal plate without paint, making them only visible up close.

The font used throughout this system is Helvetica Medium Condensed.

=== 4 Letters and 2 Numbers Series (2007-present) ===
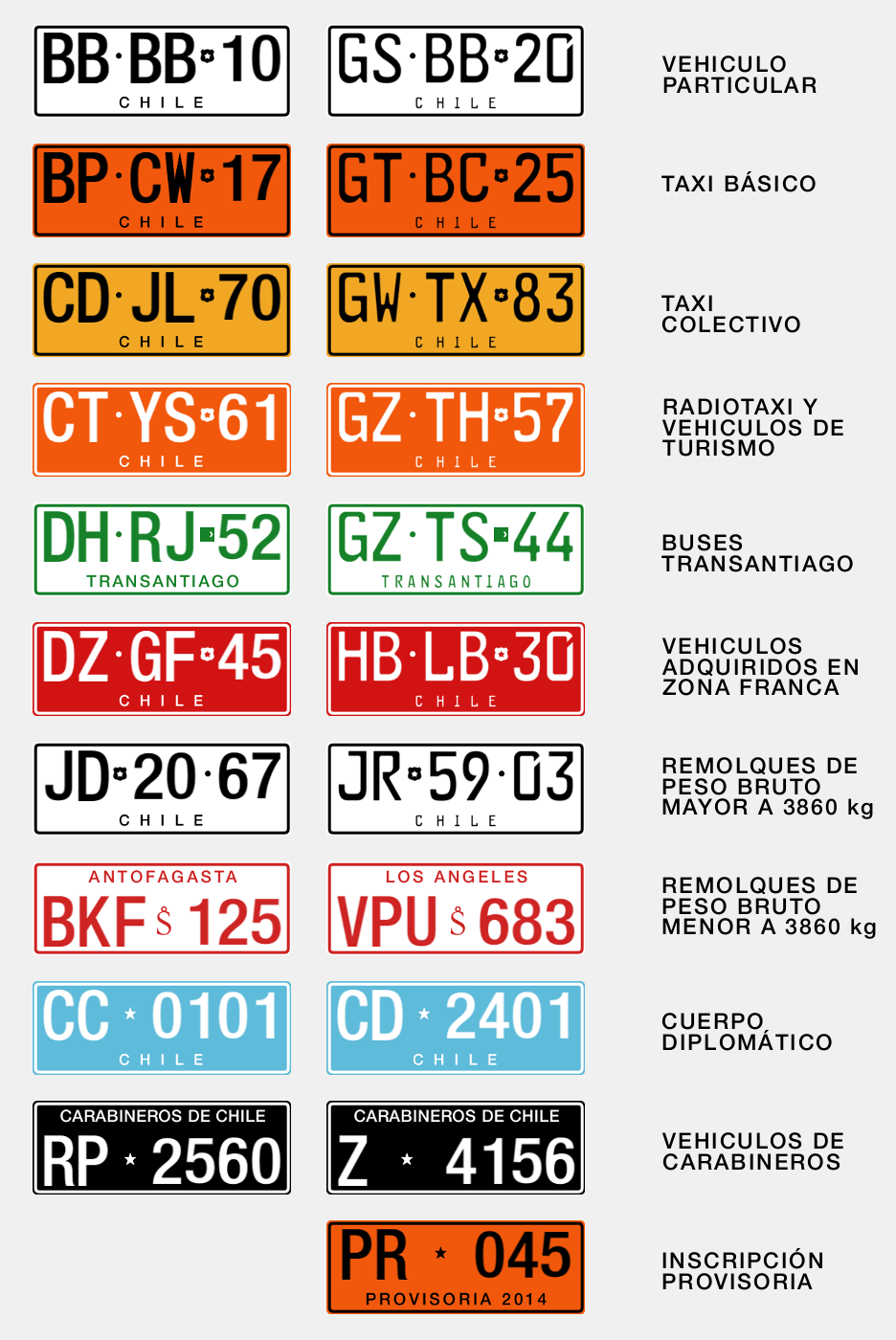
Examples of Chilean license plates: Although the current format is BB-BB·10, older plates were not replaced.

In September 2007 the new format began to be used, which is made up of 4 letters and 2 numbers ('BB-BB·10). This system uses 18 letters, which are: B, C, D, F, G, H, J, K, L, P, R, S, T, V, W, X, Y, Z. The letters M, N, Ñ, Q (for its resemblance to the O and the number 0), and the vowels (to avoid combinations that form words and thus bother vehicle drivers)) are not used. Although new vehicle plates use the BB·BB-10 format, the previous plates were not superseded, so the two formats currently coexist. The combination allows for a vehicle park of 9,447,840 (excluding Police, Armed Forces and Firefighters vehicles).

The numbers start at 10 for each series of letters, up to 99. The letters continue to be separated from the numbers by a simplification of the National emblem, and the 4 letters in 2 groups of 2 letters by a black circle. The design (frame and font) are the same as in the previous format.

Considering the pace of vehicle registrations before the current format began, it was expected that the numbering system would last around 38 to 40 years. However, due to the surge in vehicle sales, the first four initial letters (B to F) were exhausted in just 6 years, and half of the series (B to L) in only 12 years. As a result, it's unlikely that the combinations will last 25 to 30 years unless more letters are added to the sequence (for example, increasing from 18 to 20 letters would boost the number of combinations by 52%).

As in the old format, the license plates have the word CHILE included at the bottom, except for the Transantiago bus plates, which have the word TRANSANTIAGO and its corresponding isotype. Also, like the previous format, they include the signs of the Civil Registry and the Mint, with the difference that they are now printed on the plate.

Since 2014, all license plates were updated with the FE-Schrift font (Car-Go typeface) to prevent counterfeiting. A new feature was added: an indicator on the left side of the plate specifying whether it belongs on the front or rear of the vehicle.

=== Trailer license plates - National Registry of Ground Freight Transport ===
According to Law 19,872, which entered into force on December 20, 2003, trailers and semi-trailers (in addition to trucks and tractor-trailers) whose gross vehicle weight is equal to or greater than 3,860 kg. they must be registered in the National Land Freight Transport Registry, replacing the Municipal Car and Trailer Registries. Trailer and semi-trailer license plates use the same design as motor vehicle license plates, following the old format (AA·10–00) and using the full series of the letter J, notwithstanding what is established when you start using the license plate. new format (BB-BB 10) once the series is over. Only the series between JA and JP were used, being replaced by the current four-letter format identifying a hologram stamped on R (trailer) and SR (semi-trailer).

Trailers and semi-trailers with a lower gross vehicle weight continue to be registered in the municipal registries. The license plates for trailers of said registries are white, have three letters and three numbers (ABC·123) written in red, and on them indicate the commune in which they were registered. The series used are distributed geographically by commune, which could be explained by the fact that they derive from the old municipal registers of motor vehicles (until 1985).

Meanwhile, trucks and tractor-trailers registered in the National Registry of Ground Freight Transport are also enrolled in the Motor Vehicle Registry, which means they do not carry special license plates. They use the same standard vehicle plates as other motor vehicles, without any distinctive markings specific to their classification as freight transport vehicles.

=== Motorcycle license plates ===
They are small in size. They consist of 2 letters and 3 numbers (AB·123), separated by a period. Above them is the word CHILE, below these start numbered from 100 to 999. Lately they have completed the series with the letters I, J, M, O, Q and W only in the use of two-wheelers.

Each license plate contains a pair (front and rear), just like other motorized vehicles, except for Carabineros motorcycles.

As of 2014, a new format is used, that of three letters and two numbers (BBB·10) under FE-Schrift characters and the size of the plates larger than the previous ones. The combinations are identical to those of other vehicles, but started from 10 to 99.

== Special Formats ==
=== Temporary plates ===
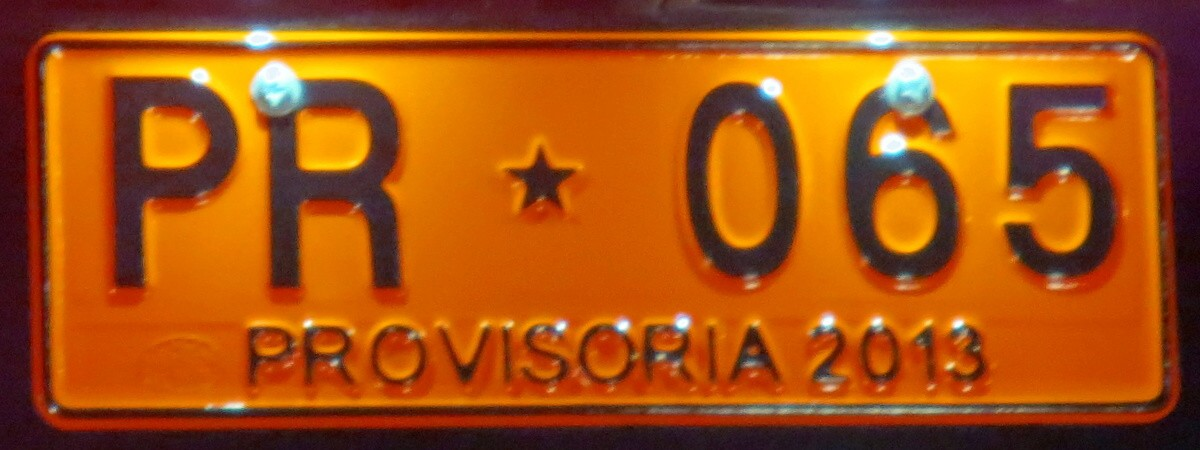
Provisional license plate.

They are the same size as regular plates, with an orange background and black characters. The format includes the letters PR followed by 3 or 4 numbers (e.g., PR·064, PR·1009), separated by a black star. The bottom of the plate features the word PROVISORIA (year) and the year it was issued (e.g., PROVISORIA 2007). These plates are used by exporters or dealerships to move vehicles without registering them, commonly for cars undergoing testing.

=== Carabineros ===
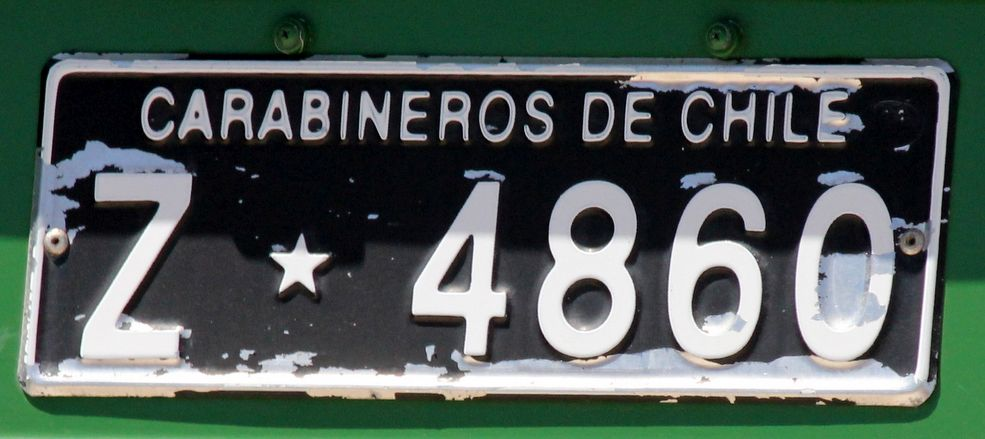
Carabineros Registration. Z = Police van

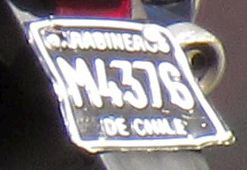
Carabinero motorcycle license plate

In the format corresponding to the vehicle fleet of Carabineros de Chile, the combinations and/or letters are used:

- Radio Patrols: RP
- Ambulances: A
- Buses: B
- Trucks: C
- Trucks (Police Support): AP
- Funeral floats: F
- Armored cars: CB
- Cranes: AG
- Vans and mobile checkpoints: Z
- Jeeps (usually gassing): J
- Water cannons: LA
- Boats: LC
- Motorcycles: M
- Cavalry School Transportation: TC
- Rolling carts (trailers): CR

They are followed by the corresponding numerical assignment which belongs only to CARABINEROS DE CHILE. Above the alphanumeric combination is the inscription CARABINEROS DE CHILE.

=== Firefighters ===
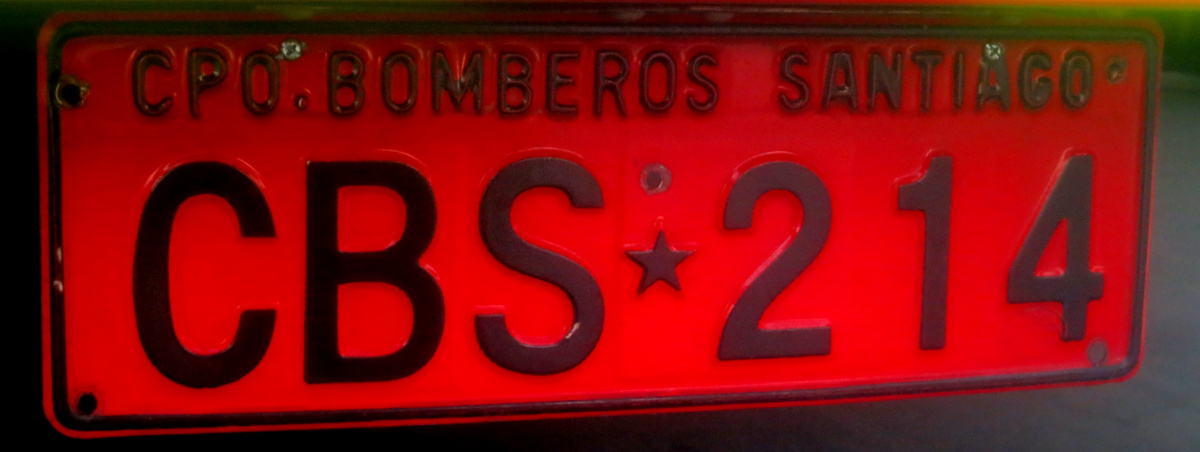
Fire Department license plate.

In some fire departments of the country, those institutional plates are used under the combination CB (Fire Department), followed by one or two letters per municipality, plus a star and an identifying number. Above it is the inscription CPO. FIREFIGHTERS and the name of the corresponding municipality.

=== Armed Forces ===
Army license plate

The Army license plates use the combination EJTO, plus the correlative numbering.

=== Diplomatic, consular and foreign mission plate prefixes ===
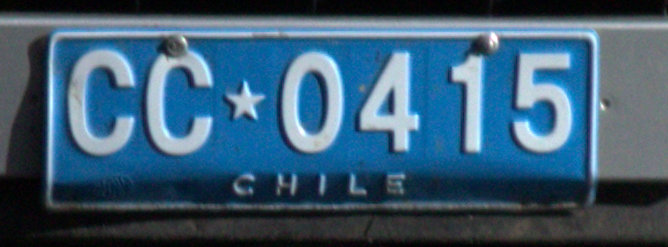
Consular Body. 04 = Argentina

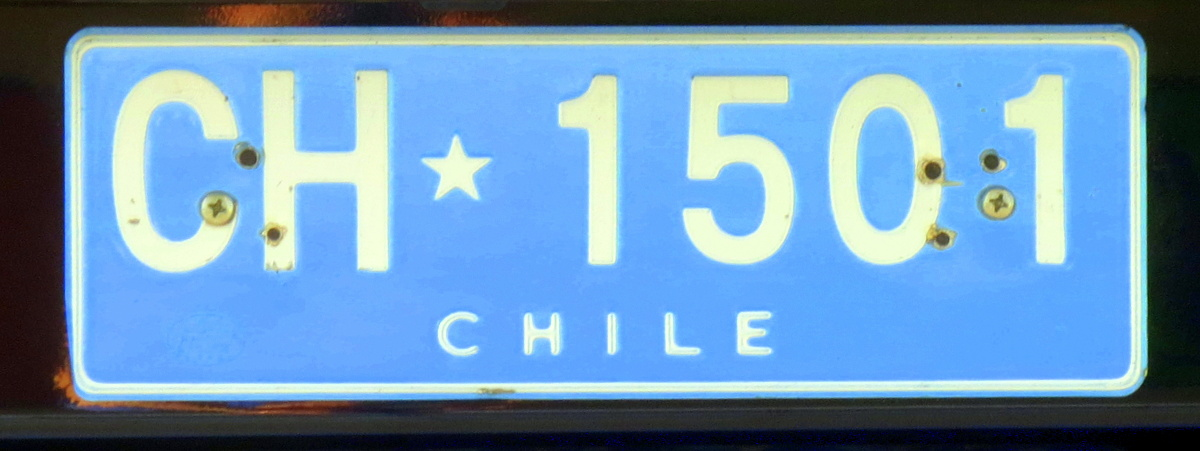
Honorary Consul. 15 = Costa Rica

The diplomatic corps series uses the following combinations: CD (Diplomatic Corps), CC (Consular Corps), AT (Personal Technical Assistance), CH (Honorary Consul), OI (International Organization) and PAT (Temporary Admission Permit), followed by their corresponding numbers, separated by a small star. Under this is the inscription CHILE. The first double digits identify the country or organization arranged in alphabetical order.

These are some of the countries that they represent by two first digits:

Digit	Country or Organization	Digit	Country or Organization	Digit	Country or Organization
01	Vatican City	02	Germany	04	Argentina
05	Australia	06	Austria	07	Belgium
09	Brazil	10	Bulgaria	11	Canada
12	Czech Republic	13	Colombia	14	South Korea
15	Costa Rica	16	Croatia	17	Cuba
18	Denmark	20	Egypt	21	El Salvador
22	Kuwait	23	Spain	24	United States
25	United States	26	Ethiopia	27	Russia
28	Philippines	29	Finland	30	France
31	Saudi Arabia	32	Greece	33	Guatemala
34	Haiti	35	Honduras	36	Hungary
37	India	38	Indonesia	39	Israel
40	Italy	41	Japan	42	Jordan
43	Lebanon	44	Malaysia	45	Morocco
46	Mexico	47	Nicaragua	48	Norway
49	New Zealand	51	Netherlands	52	Panama
53	Paraguay	54	Peru	55	Poland
56	Portugal	57	United Kingdom	58	Syria
59	Algeria	60	Dominican Republic	61	Iran
62	China	63	Romania	65	South Africa
66	Sweden	67	Switzerland	68	Thailand
69	Turkey	70	Uruguay	71	Venezuela
72	Vietnam	73	Pakistan	76	Iraq
77	United Arab Emirates	78	Ukraine	80	European Union
81	Palestine	99	Bolivia		

== Material, colors and measurements ==
The license plate is a metal sheet made of aluminum, with specific colors depending on the vehicle's use. These colors apply to the formats AA·10·00 and BB·BB·10.

- Private vehicles (AA·00·00, AA·AA·00), trailers (JA·00·00, AA·AA·00) and motorcycles (AA*000, AAA*00): white background with black letters.
- Carabineros de Chile: black background with white letters. (some of these plates are plastic, made by entities outside the Chilean Mint)
- Diplomats: Plates AT, CC, CD, OI, PAT (Transitory Access Permit), CH (Honorary Consul) blue background with white letters.
- Basic Taxi: dark orange background with black letters.
- Radiotaxi tourism: light orange background with white letters.
- Share taxis: yellow background with black letters.
- Buses of Transantiago: white background with green letters.
- Vehicles purchased in ZOFRI: red background with white letters (formats AA·10·00 and AA·AA·00, cars and trucks).
- Temporary Plates: orange background with black characters. (PR*000 and PR*0000 from 2014)
- Firefighters: red background with black or white letters.
- Electric vehicles (since 2026): green background with black characters.

== Trivia ==
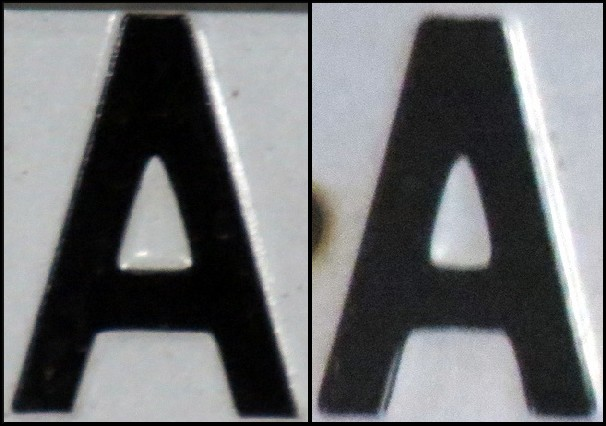
Comparison of characters before and after the transition.

- The combinations that were never used in the old system, and therefore do not appear in the combination list of the Instructivo para Validación de Patentes (Instructions for License Plate Validation) from the Civil Registry and Identification Service, include: BB, AD, AK, AY, GG, HZ, DC and VW. These were later incorporated only for motorcycles (except GG and VW). The only combinations that ended in M and Q, and used I and O, according to the same guidelines, were: XM, XQ, DI, ZI, JO, AI, BI, BM, BO, CI, CM, CO, DM and DO.
  - Despite being included in said document, the combinations JO, XM, XQ and ZI do not exist in No vehicle registered or in the records.
- 582 2-letter combinations are recorded in that instruction manual, including combinations of trailers and motorcycles.
- For 7 years, the combination UE was used only for taxis and collective taxis of all kinds, except for tourist taxis, this between 2000 and 2007. Other combinations used exclusively in smaller collective locomotion vehicles were ZC, ZG, ZZ -the latter mostly used in basic taxis-, WP and some XH and YC. For the new 4-letter, 2-digit format some combinations for these vehicles are: BC, BJ, BX, CX, DK, FD, FL, GB, GP, HG, HW, JW and the last ones have been KC, KD, KY, LZ and PV.
- Since 2014, certain combinations for new system trailers and semitrailers are GR, HG, HX, JW, KD , KY, PT, PW and PX.
- As of 2008, most buses Transantiago (today RED) began to have exclusive serials for their new buses, these began with the combination BJFxxx (from BJFB10 to BJFZ99), then they occupied the combinations CJRxxx, the combinations FLXxxx, and the combinations GCBxxx. However, there are new buses that arrived in the system that were registered with whatever serials were assigned at the time. Also, there are buses of these serials that were withdrawn and are distributed to provinces and regions.
- Formerly, free zone plates had a red background and white letters, this plate configuration towards the end of 2004 began to be used on the plates of vehicles entered by free zone (Iquique and Punta Arenas). As an annex, it can be mentioned that the combinations ZD, ZE, ZF, WL, WN and some ZZ were only assigned to plates of this category in their early days.
- The design of license plates changed in 1991, starting with the combination DP. The characters' strokes were made slightly thinner, and the stamping process was standardized.
- Also switched between the MX combination (the last of the old system, except for motorcycles and J-combinations for trailers) and BB.BB-10. The new plates have the letters stamped at right angles, so the relief is flat, while in the previous plates, the relief was rounded. As of the font change, the current string is maintained, starting the combination GK.
  - From the PV combination, a little more thickness is observed in the letter together with a hologram-type stamp on them, which are reflected through light.
