= Jonathan Zacaría =

Argentine footballer

Personal information
- Full name: Jonathan Fabián Zacaría
- Date of birth: 6 February 1990 (age 36)
- Place of birth: Ramos Mejía, Argentina
- Height: 1.72 m (5 ft 8 in)
- Positions: Left winger; left-back

Youth career
- Almirante Brown

Senior career*
| Years | Team | Apps | (Gls) |
| 2007–2013 | Almirante Brown | 88 | (11) |
| 2011–2012 | → Platense (loan) | 34 | (9) |
| 2013–2016 | Quilmes | 44 | (2) |
| 2015–2016 | → Palestino (loan) | 28 | (4) |
| 2016–2020 | Universidad de Chile | 19 | (5) |
| 2020–2022 | Aldosivi | 25 | (1) |
| 2023 | Almirante Brown | 24 | (0) |
| 2024 | San Martín SJ | 16 | (0) |
| 2025 | Almirante Brown | 6 | (0) |
| Total | | 284 | (32) |
- * Club domestic league appearances and goals

Jonathan Fabián Zacaría (born 6 February 1990) is an Argentine former footballer who played as a left-back.

== Career ==
In October 2020, Zacaría joined Aldosivi. He scored his first goal for his new team on December 6, 2021, against Argentinos Juniors.

In 2025, Zacaría returned to Almirante Brown from San Martín de San Juan.

On 19 May 2026, Zacaría announced his retirement.

== Post-retirement ==
Zacaría graduated as a sporting director.

== Honours ==
Universidad de Chile

- Primera División (1): 2017–C
