= Adrián Cuadra =

Chilean footballer (born 1997)

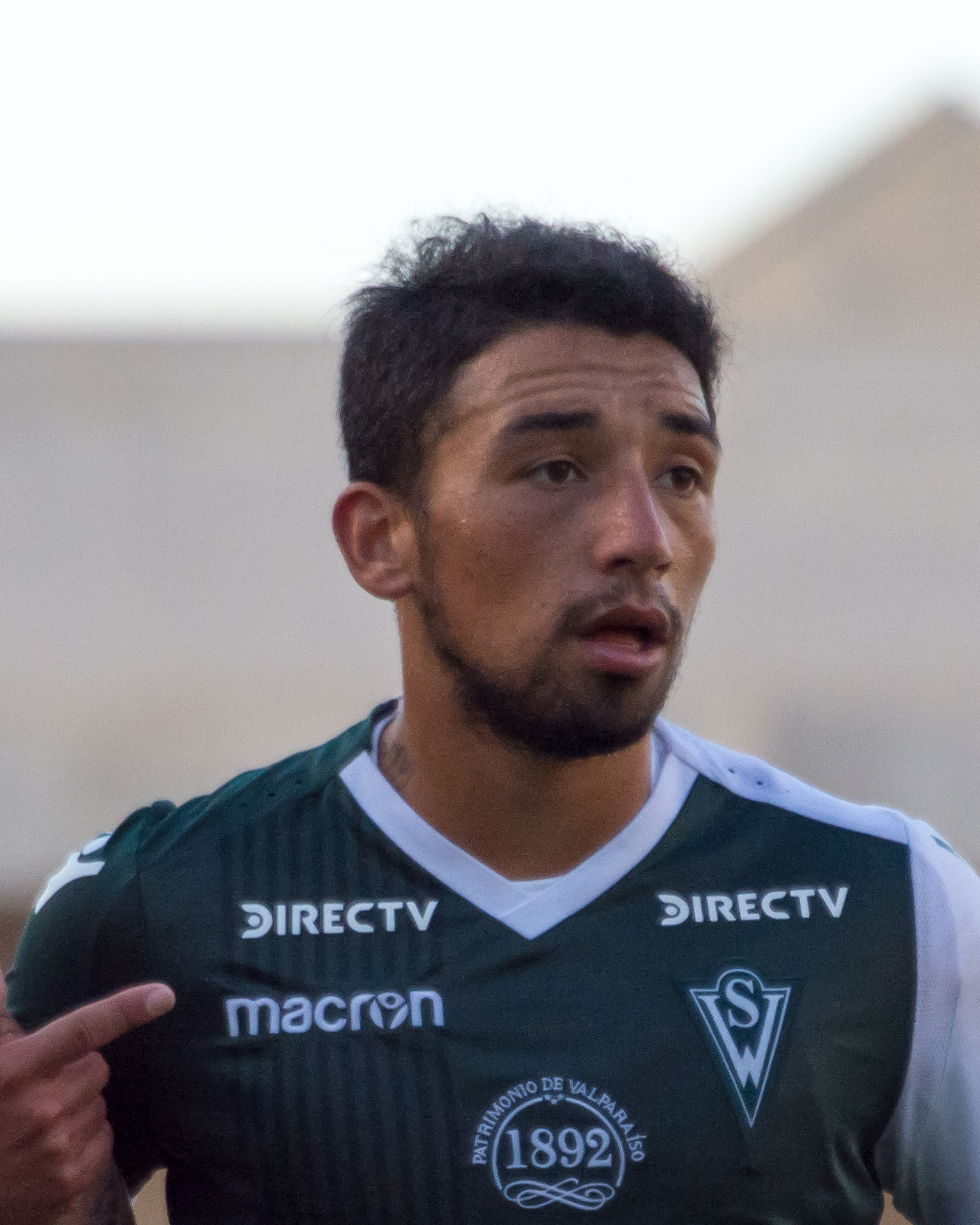

Personal information
- Full name: Adrián Ignacio Cuadra Cabrera
- Date of birth: 23 October 1997 (age 29)
- Place of birth: Valparaíso, Chile
- Height: 1.71 m (5 ft 7 1/2 in)
- Position: Midfielder

Team information
- Current team: Deportes Antofagasta
- Number: 3

Youth career
- Santiago Wanderers

Senior career*
Years	Team	Apps	(Gls)
2015–2019	Santiago Wanderers	94	(3)
2020–	Deportes Antofagasta	32	(0)

International career^{‡}
2016–2017	Chile U20	7	(0)
2020	Chile U23	4	(0)
- * Club domestic league appearances and goals as of 14 December 2021 ‡ National team caps and goals as of 14 December 2021

Adrián Ignacio Cuadra Cabrera (born 23 October 1997) is a professional Chilean football midfielder currently playing for C.D. Antofagasta in the Primera División of Chile.

== International career ==
He was called up for the senior national team to face Mexico in June 2016, but failed to make an appearance.
