= Jason Silva (footballer) =

Chilean footballer (born 1991)

Personal information
- Full name: Jason Alejandro Silva Pérez
- Date of birth: 13 February 1991 (age 35)
- Place of birth: Santiago, Chile
- Height: 1.70 m (5 ft 7 in)
- Position: Midfielder

Youth career
- Palestino

Senior career*
Years	Team	Apps	(Gls)
2011–2017	Palestino	113	(8)
2013–2014	→ Colo-Colo (loan)	15	(0)
2015	→ Deportes Antofagasta (loan)	10	(0)
2016	→ Unión La Calera (loan)	9	(0)
2017–2018	Apollon Limassol	0	(0)
2018–2019	San Marcos	9	(0)
2022	Real San Joaquín	0	(0)
- * Club domestic league appearances and goals as of 18 December 2023

Jason Alejandro Silva Pérez (born February 13, 1991) is a Chilean footballer who plays as a midfielder. He last played for Real San Joaquín.

== Career ==
A product of Palestino youth system, he played on loan at Colo-Colo from 2013 to 2014. In 2017, he joined Cypriot side Apollon Limassol, playing at the Europa League. On second half 2018, he joined San Marcos de Arica in the Primera B de Chile.

He tried to return to football by joining Ecuadorian side Fuerza Amarilla in 2020 and Deportes Concepción in 2021. In 2022, he returned to the activity after joining Real San Joaquín in the Segunda División Profesional de Chile.

== Controversies ==
On 6 April 2014, while he played for Colo-Colo in the Chilean Superclásico, he trampled a Universidad de Chile flag, being arrested for inciting to violence.

In 2019, he was arrested for drunk driving, carrying a fake driver license and bribing the police.

In 2020, he was arrested in the context of a police operation called Operación Clon (Clone Operation), what investigated a criminal band focused on a kind of crime called portonazo (gate robbery) in Chile and South America consisting of taking cars violently.

== Honours ==
Colo-Colo

- Chilean Primera División (1): 2014 Clausura

Apollon Limassol

- Cypriot Super Cup (1): 2017
