= Miguel Coronado =

Chilean footballer (born 1987)

Personal information
- Full name: Miguel Coronado
- Date of birth: February 6, 1987 (age 39)
- Place of birth: Peñalolén, Chile
- Height: 1.77 m (5 ft 9 1/2 in)
- Positions: Winger; striker

Youth career
- Universidad de Chile

Senior career*
| Years | Team | Apps | (Gls) |
| 2007–2009 | Universidad de Chile | 16 | (0) |
| 2008 | → Unión La Calera (loan) | 0 | (0) |
| 2010 | Unión San Felipe | 12 | (0) |
| 2011 | San Marcos de Arica | 32 | (0) |
| 2012 | Curicó Unido | 21 | (2) |
| 2013–2017 | San Marcos de Arica | 70 | (1) |
- * Club domestic league appearances and goals as of 16 October 2017

Miguel Coronado (born February 6, 1987) is a Chilean footballer. He began his career in the youth system of Universidad de Chile before making his debut in the 2007 Apertura tournament.

== Honours ==
=== Club ===
Universidad de Chile

- Primera División de Chile (1): 2009 Apertura
