= Roberto Saldías =

Chilean footballer (born 1993)

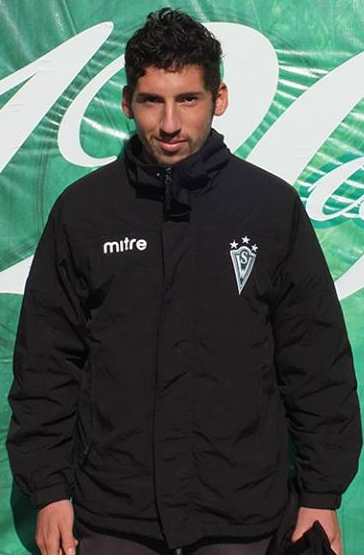

Personal information
- Full name: Roberto Jesús Saldías Díaz
- Date of birth: 20 February 1991 (age 35)
- Place of birth: Santiago, Chile
- Height: 1.73 m (5 ft 8 in)
- Position: Forward

Youth career
- Santiago Wanderers

Senior career*
Years	Team	Apps	(Gls)
2012–2018	Santiago Wanderers	36	(3)
2018	→ Rangers (loan)	4	(0)
2019	Rangers	4	(0)
2020–2021	Deportes Linares	7	(0)
- * Club domestic league appearances and goals as of 21 July 2022

Roberto Jesús Saldías Díaz (born 25 February 1993) is a Chilean footballer who last played for Deportes Linares in the Segunda División Profesional de Chile.

== Personal life ==
He is son of the Chilean popular humorist known as El Chino (The Chinese) from Los Atletas de la Risa (The Laugh Athletes).
