= Pedro Carrizo =

Chilean footballer (born 1980)

Personal information
- Full name: Pedro Alex Carrizo Cordova
- Date of birth: 9 November 1980 (age 46)
- Place of birth: Antofagasta, Chile
- Height: 1.83 m (6 ft 0 in)
- Position: Goalkeeper

Youth career
- Deportes La Serena

Senior career*
Years	Team	Apps	(Gls)
1999–2008	Deportes La Serena	124	(0)
2005	→ Ovalle (loan)	38	(0)
2009–2010	Antofagasta	67	(0)
2011–2016	San Marcos de Arica	161	(0)
2017	Deportes La Serena	15	(0)
2018	Santiago Morning	26	(0)
2019	Deportes La Serena	16	(0)
- * Club domestic league appearances and goals as of 29 June 2020

Pedro Alex Carrizo Cordova (born 9 November 1980) is a retired Chilean former professional footballer who played as a goalkeeper and his last team was Deportes La Serena.

== Honours ==
=== Club ===
San Marcos de Arica

- Primera B: 2012
