= Mauricio Viana =

Chilean footballer (born 1989)

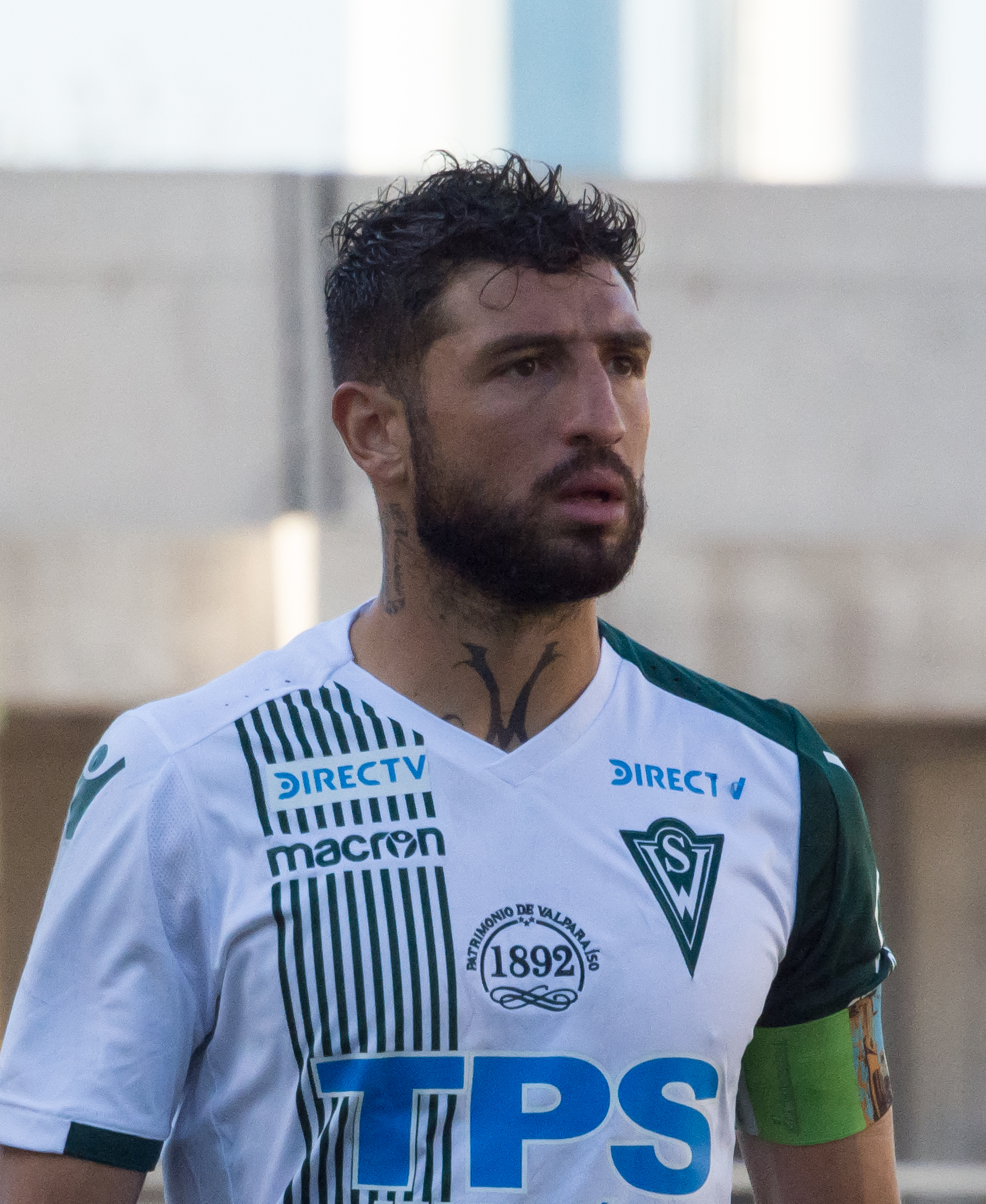
- Viana with Santiago Wanderers in 2019

Personal information
- Full name: Mauricio Alejandro Viana Caamaño
- Date of birth: 14 June 1989 (age 37)
- Place of birth: São Paulo, Brazil
- Height: 1.85 m (6 ft 1 in)
- Position: Goalkeeper

Youth career
- Lautaro de Limache
- Municipal Limache
- Everton
- Santiago Wanderers

Senior career*
Years	Team	Apps	(Gls)
2008–2021	Santiago Wanderers	264	(0)
2008	→ Unión Quilpué (loan)	–	(–)
2016	→ Chiapas (loan)	0	(0)
2016	→ Chiapas Premier (loan)	1	(0)
2017	→ Sporting Cristal (loan)	42	(0)
2022–2023	Deportes Puerto Montt	49	(0)
2024	Trasandino	13	(0)

International career
2012	Chile U25	1	(0)
- * Club domestic league appearances and goals

Mauricio Alejandro Viana Caamaño (born 14 June 1989) is a former footballer who played as a goalkeeper. Born in Brazil, he represented Chile at youth level.

== Early life ==
Viana was born in São Paulo, Brazil to a Brazilian father and a Chilean mother. When he was 5, he and his mother moved to Limache, where he was raised.

== Club career ==
On 4 August 2013, Viana was injured towards the end of a match against Audax Italiano, but played on to the end and saved a late penalty to keep the score goalless. After the match, he received emergency surgery for a perforated intestine.

In 2024, Viana signed with Trasandino in the Segunda División Profesional de Chile. In July of the same year, he announced his retirement due to a serious physical degeneration.

== International career ==
He was a substitute at the friendly matches of the Chile senior team against Paraguay and Peru in December 2011 and April 2012 respectively. After defeating Peru, Chile won the Copa del Pacífico.

In addition, he represented Chile in a match against Uruguay U23 played in Maldonado, Uruguay. The squad only included under-25 players and was a loss by 6–4.

== Honours ==
Santiago Wanderers

- Primera B: 2019

Chile

- Copa del Pacífico: 2012
