= Universidad Internacional SEK =

University in Ecuador

Coordinates: 0.0910°S 78.4845°W

- Type: Private university
- Established: 1993
- Affiliations: Institución Internacional SEK
- Rector: Raimon Salazar
- Location: Quito, Ecuador
- Campus: Three in Quito
- Colours: Blue & White
- Website: (in Spanish)

Universidad Internacional SEK is an Ecuadorian university that has campuses in Ecuador, Chile and Spain.

== Santa Laura ==
Universidad SEK also is owner of a football stadium in Chile. It is the fourth largest stadium in Chile and the home grounds to Unión Española.

== See also ==
- Universities in Ecuador
