= Jorge Luna (Argentine footballer) =

Argentine footballer

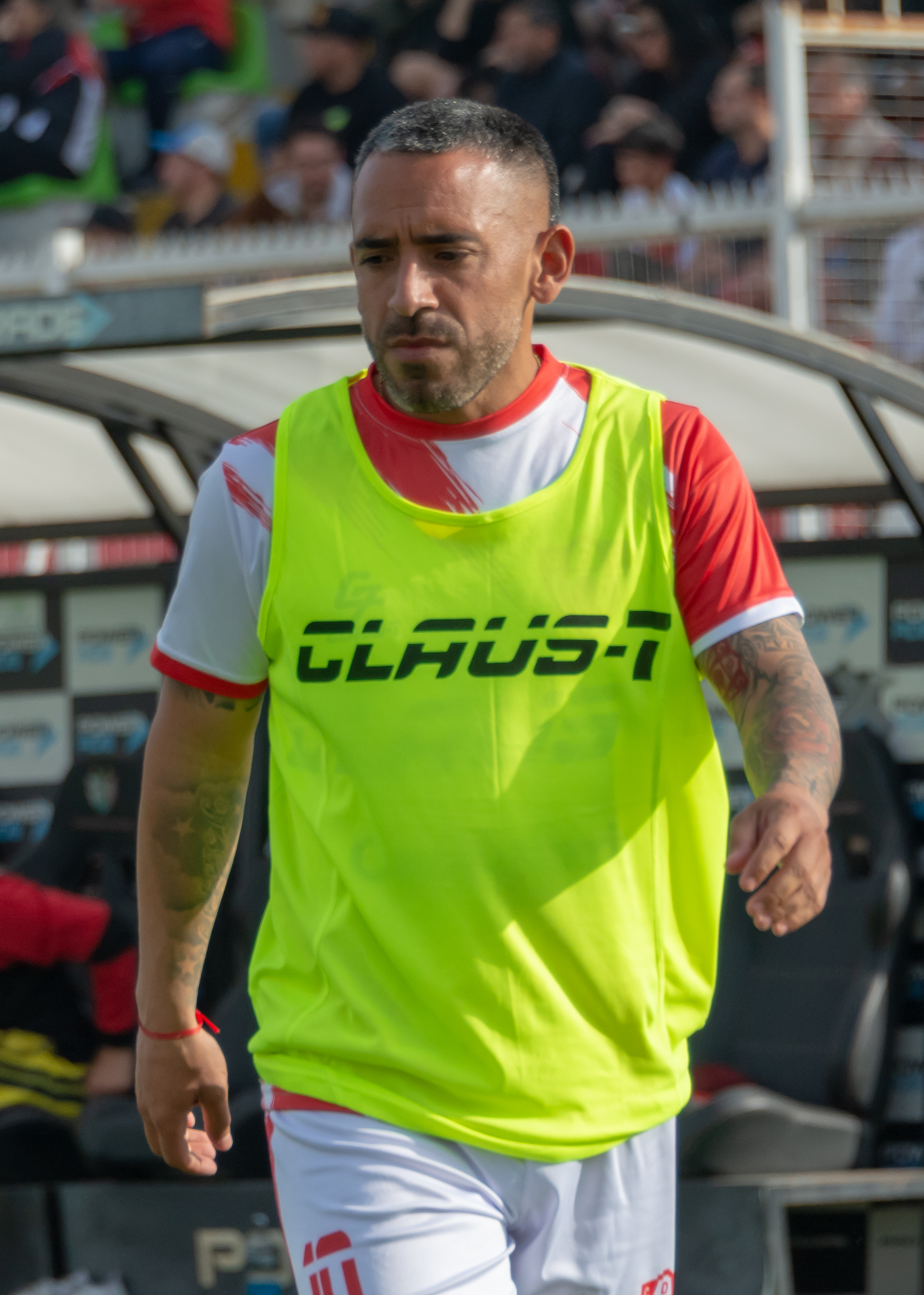
- Luna with Deportes Copiapó in 2023

Personal information
- Full name: Jorge Luis Luna Vacca
- Date of birth: 14 December 1986 (age 39)
- Place of birth: Buenos Aires, Argentina
- Height: 1.67 m (5 ft 6 in)
- Position: Midfielder

Team information
- Current team: Santiago Wanderers
- Number: 10

Youth career
- Caza y Pesca
- Deportivo Armenio

Senior career*
Years	Team	Apps	(Gls)
2003–2007	Deportivo Armenio	62	(9)
2007–2012	Gimnasia de Jujuy	135	(18)
2012–2013	San Martín SJ	35	(7)
2013–2014	Estudiantes LP	17	(0)
2014–2015	Santiago Wanderers	32	(14)
2015–2016	Al Dhafra	5	(0)
2016	San Martín SJ	6	(1)
2017	Universidad de Concepción	9	(0)
2018	Cobreloa	25	(3)
2019	Rangers	25	(4)
2020	Deportivo Armenio	4	(0)
2020–2024	Deportes Copiapó	129	(17)
2025–	Santiago Wanderers	0	(0)
- * Club domestic league appearances and goals as of 11 December 2024

Jorge Luis Luna Vacca (born December 14, 1986) is an Argentine footballer who plays as a midfielder for Santiago Wanderers.

== Career ==
Luna returned to Santiago Wanderers for the 2025 season after ten years and five seasons with Deportes Copiapó.
