= Free Zone of Iquique =

Coordinates: 20°12′25.47″S 70°08′00.99″W

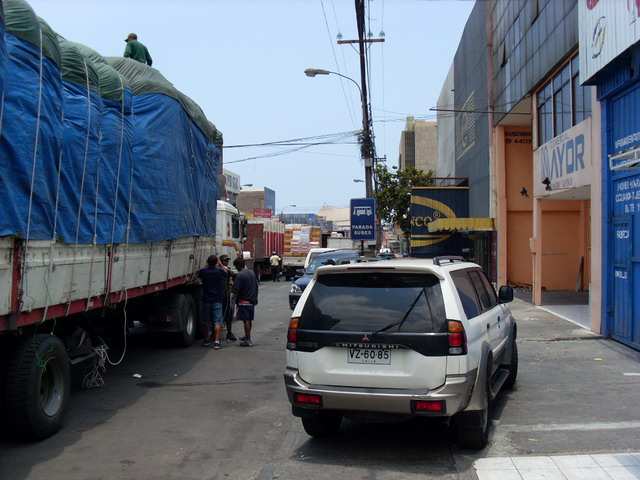
The walled enclosure of ZOFRI, truck loading place Bolivians, Peruvians and Paraguayans.

The Zona Franca de Iquique (Free Zone of Iquique; acronym Zofri) is a free-trade zone located in the coastal port city of Iquique, in Iquique Province of the Tarapacá Region, northwestern Chile.

== History ==
It was created under the military government of Chile (1973–1990) of Augusto Pinochet on June 25 of 1975, and zone by Ordonnance, in order to support the economic development of the area, as far as jobs and economic integration is about.

It has become an important center of trade in foreign countries in the region as Argentina, Brazil, Paraguay, Peru and Bolivia. Its strategic location allows it to be the entrance and exit to products that make trade between the Mercosur, Latin America, and Asia.

The ZOFRI administration, by law transfers the equivalent of 15% of its revenue to municipalities in the Tarapacá Region and Arica y Parinacota Region.

== Business lines ==
Among its business lines include:

Logistics service
receiving merchandise, documentation management, transportation, inventory and shipments.
Real estate business
sale or lease of industrial land and lease space at the mall. This line of business represents 75% of revenues.

== Administration ==
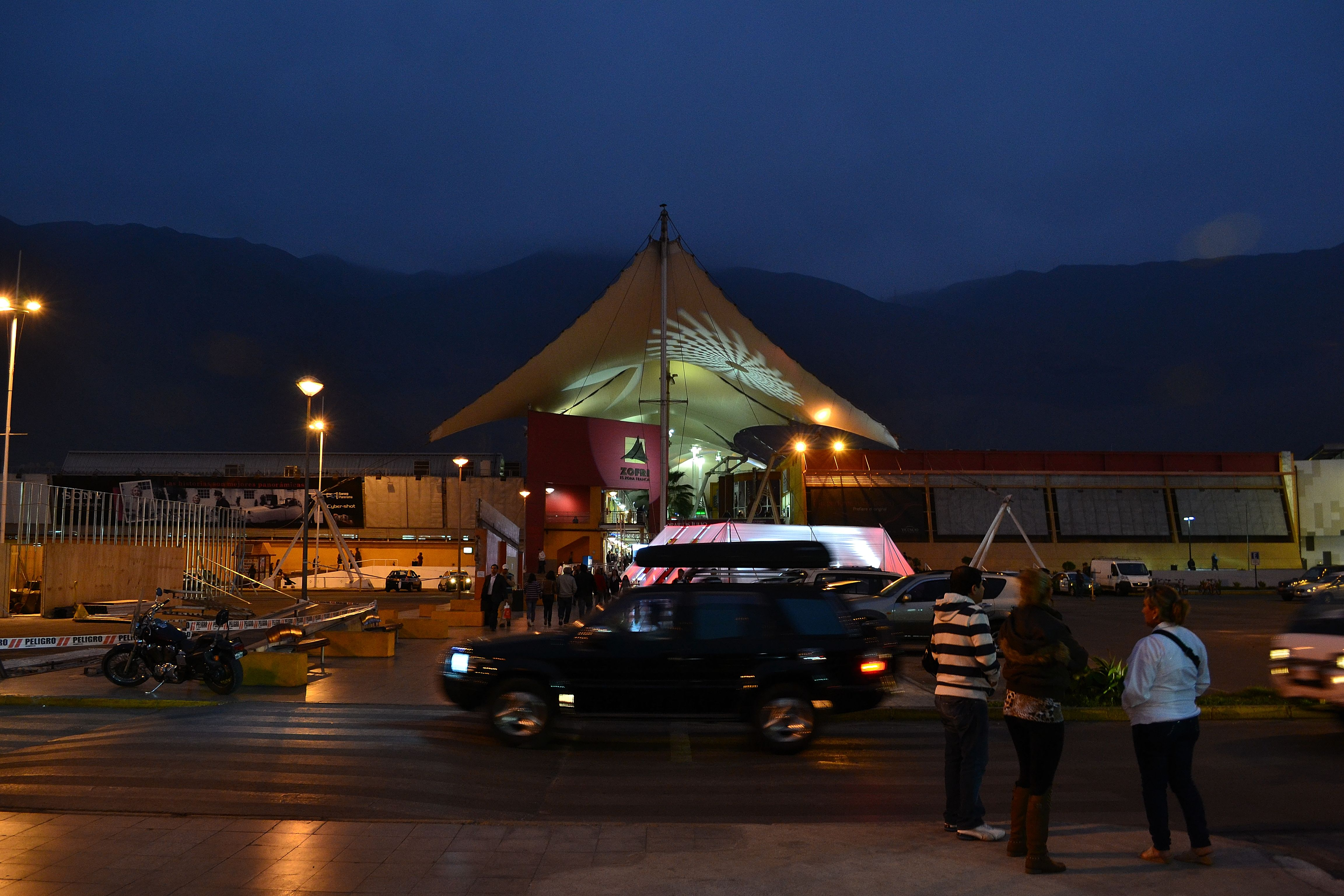
Commercial Center Of Zofri.

ZOFRI S.A. Is the management company and operator of the Zona Franca de Iquique, in concession for 40 years, signed with the State of Chile. Its property is in the hands of CORFO (over 70% of shares) and the rest in private investors. Its shares are traded on the Santiago Stock Exchange

The zone consists of a 240 ha enclosure built north of downtown Iquique known as the «walled enclosure» or «industrial district». Inside a 1650 operating companies that trade goods free of duties and taxes, with annual sales of U.S. $ 2.1 billion (2006). Goods can be stored, processed, finished or sold without restriction. It also has a mall (Mall ZOFRI) of 30,000 m^{2} where more than 600 stores (known as "modules") offer various retail products, highlighting Perfume, appliance, electronics, equipment computing, cigarettes, liquor, toys and costumes.

Currently the ZOFRI has entered a new expansion that will include more than 1,000 new stores and a new station Fast Food.

ZOFRI S.A. has other assets in the nearby commune Alto Hospicio, with 129 ha in area, and Arica, a city 310 km north of Iquique, 122 ha.

The 50% of its revenue comes from leasing and sale of commercial and industrial land. The other 50% is obtained the lease of commercial and service delivery.

ZOFRI has been the engine that has driven the economy of this city. Currently generates over 20,000 direct and indirect jobs. One attraction of the city is to go shopping at the Mall ZOFRI where visitors to the city can take up to U.S. $ 1,200 (or 900 €) in free merchandise from payment of customs duty of 6%, Alcohol Law and Tax tax 19%.

Sales mainly abroad are: Bolivia, Peru and Paraguay. Its imports are led by Asia (China, Hong Kong and Taiwan), representing 60% of purchases of ZOFRI. The main products are automobiles, machinery, equipment and apparel.

== Tax and customs benefits ==
Companies operating in ZOFRI have the following franchises:

- Exemption from payment of the First Category tax.
- Exemption from payment of VAT (Value Added Tax) in operations conducted under the free zone regime.
- Exemption from payment of VAT (Value Added Tax) for services provided within the enclosure Zofri.

From a customs standpoint goods remain within the precincts of Zofri are considered as if they were abroad, therefore the goods leaving the premises ZOFRI to destinations abroad are not taxed. For sales within Chile, there is differentiated tax treatment for sales on the I region or the rest of the country.
