= 2011 Colo-Colo season (Clausura) =

Colo-Colo
2011 season
- Chairman: (Chile) Guillermo Mackenna
- Manager: (Argentina) Américo Gallego (until 18 August) (Chile) Luis Pérez (caretaker) (Chile) Ivo Basay (since 30 August)
- Torneo Clausura: Semifinals
- Copa Libertadores: Group stage
- Copa Chile: Third round (21st position)
- Top goalscorer: Esteban Paredes (14 goals)
Home colours	Away colours

The 2011 season was Club Social y Deportivo Colo-Colo's 80th season in Primera División Chilena. This article shows player statistics and all official matches that the club have and will play during the 2011 season, from July to December.

The 2011 season consisted of two local tournaments, the Clausura and the local Copa Chile competition.

== Campeonato Clausura ==
=== Players ===
==== Squad ====
Note: Flags indicate national team as defined under FIFA eligibility rules; some limited exceptions apply. Players may hold more than one non-FIFA nationality.

No.	Pos.	Nation	Player
1	GK	URU	Juan Guillermo Castillo
2	DF	CHI	Cristián Vilches
3	DF	CHI	Luis Mena
5	MF	PAR	Osmar Molinas
6	FW	CHI	Mario Salgado
7	FW	CHI	Esteban Paredes (captain)
9	FW	CHI	Daud Gazale
10	MF	CHI	Marco Medel
11	FW	CHI	Carlos Muñoz
12	GK	CHI	Raúl Olivares
13	MF	CHI	José Pedro Fuenzalida
14	MF	CHI	Rodrigo Millar
15	MF	CHI	Boris Rieloff
16	MF	CHI	Mauro Olivi
17	MF	CHI	José Luis Cabión

No.	Pos.	Nation	Player
18	MF	ARG	Lucas Wilchez
19	DF	URU	Andrés Scotti
20	DF	CHI	Álvaro Ormeño
21	MF	CHI	Bryan Rabello
22	FW	CHI	Roberto Gutiérrez
23	MF	CHI	Luis Pavez
24	DF	CHI	Jose Luis Jeréz
25	GK	CHI	Francisco Prieto
26	DF	CHI	Sebastián Toro
27	DF	CHI	Cristián Magaña
28	DF	CHI	Manuel Bravo
30	MF	CHI	Jorge Aravena
31	FW	CHI	Phillip Araos
33	DF	PAR	Nelson Cabrera
34	FW	CHI	Jorge Troncoso

==== Squad stats ====
				Total				Apertura		Copa Libertadores		Copa Chile		
N	Pos.	Name	Nat.	GS	App	Gls	Min	App	Gls	App	Gls	App	Gls	Notes
1	GK	J. Castillo	(Uruguay)											
2	DF	C. Vilches	(Chile)	1	1			1						
3	DF	L. Mena	(Chile)											
4	DF	A. Ormeño	(Chile)											
5	MF	O. Molinas	(Paraguay)											
6	FW	M. Salgado	(Chile)											
7	FW	E. Paredes	(Chile)											
10	MF	M. Medel	(Chile)											
11	FW	C. Muñoz	(Chile)											
12	GK	R. Olivares	(Chile)											
13	MF	J.P. Fuenzalida	(Chile)											
14	MF	R. Millar	(Chile)	1	1			1						
15	DF	B. Rieloff	(Chile)											
16	DF	M. Olivi	(Argentina)											
17	MF	J.L. Cabión	(Chile)	1	1			1						
18	MF	L. Wílchez	(Argentina)		1			1						
19	DF	A. Scotti	(Uruguay)	1	1			1						
20	MF	M. Villanueva	(Chile)											
21	MF	B. Rabello	(Chile)											
22	FW	R. Gutiérrez	(Chile)											
23	MF	L. Pavez	(Chile)	1	1			1						
24	DF	P. Jeréz	(Chile)											
25	GK	F. Prieto	(Chile)											
26	DF	S. Toro	(Chile)											
27	DF	C. Magaña	(Chile)											
28	DF	M. Bravo	(Chile)											
30	DF	J. Aravena	(Chile)											
31	FW	P. Araos	(Chile)											
33	DF	N. Cabrera	(Chile)											
34	FW	J. Troncoso	(Chile)											

Last updated: 23 January
Source: Competitive matches
Ordered by {{{o}}}
0 shown as blank

=== Competitions ===
==== Torneo Clausura (regular stage) ====
Pos	Team	Pld	W	D	L	GF	GA	GD	Pts	Qualification
1	Universidad de Chile	17	11	6	0	39	15	+24	39	Play-offs
2	Cobreloa	17	9	4	4	27	17	+10	31	Play-offs
3	Colo-Colo	17	9	3	5	27	28	−1	30	Play-offs
4	Audax Italiano	17	8	5	4	29	23	+6	29	Play-offs
5	Universidad Católica	17	8	4	5	29	18	+11	28	Play-offs

Source: RSSSF

7 August 2011 Week 2	Colo-Colo	3–1	Santiago Wanderers	Macul, Santiago
18:30	R. Gutiérrez 32', 55'; Paredes 75'	Report	Pérez 40'	Stadium: Monumental; Attendance: 12,000; Referee: Carlos Rumiano

14 August 2011 Week 3	Universidad de Concepción	3–0	Colo-Colo	Concepción
15:30	Carvallo 46'; R. Ramos 54'; Contreras 65'	Report		Stadium: Collao; Attendance: 16,178; Referee: Enrique Osses

21 August 2011 Week 4	Colo-Colo	2–2	Unión San Felipe	Macul, Santiago
18:30	Paredes 27'; Fuenzalida 89'	Report	Merlo 21'; Prichoda 23'	Stadium: Monumental; Attendance: 10,191; Referee: Patricio Polic

24 August 2011 Week 5	Colo-Colo	3–1	Palestino	Macul, Santiago
20:00	Paredes 8', 21'; Muñoz 90+2' (pen.)	Report	Canales 64'	Stadium: Monumental; Attendance: 2,000; Referee: Enrique Osses

27 August 2011 Week 6	Huachipato	1–2	Colo-Colo	Talcahuano
17:30	Sandoval 85'	Report	Muñoz 24'; Paredes 63'	Stadium: CAP; Attendance: 10,000; Referee: Julio Bascuñán

3 September 2011 Week 1(*)	Cobresal	0–2	Colo-Colo	El Salvador
12:00	Cabión (red card) 82'	Report	Paredes 41', 45' (red card) 82'	Stadium: El Cobre; Attendance: 4,348; Referee: Eduardo Gamboa
Note: The match was originally scheduled for 31 July, but was postponed due to a snow storm that affected the Estadio El Cobre in El Salvador.

10 September 2011 Week 7	Colo-Colo	3–2	Unión Española	Macul, Santiago
20:30	Scotti 10'; Millar 40'; Muñoz 60'	Report	Delgado 14'; Ligüera 37'	Stadium: Monumental; Attendance: 11,792; Referee: Claudio Puga

17 September 2011 Week 8	Unión La Calera	3–0	Colo-Colo	Independencia, Santiago
15:30	Simón 5', 17'; Fernández 56'	Report	Toro (red card) 78'; Olivi (red card) 83'	Stadium: Santa Laura; Attendance: 5,003; Referee: Eduardo Gamboa

25 September 2011 Week 9	Cobreloa	0–1	Colo-Colo	Calama
16:00		Report	Paredes 56'	Stadium: Municipal; Attendance: 9,158; Referee: Patricio Polic

29 September 2011 Week 10	Colo-Colo	3–0	Audax Italiano	Macul, Santiago
20:30	Muñoz 10'; Millar 64'; Medel 90+1'	Report		Stadium: Monumental; Attendance: 13,191; Referee: Jorge Osorio

2 October 2011 Week 11	Deportes La Serena	4–0	Colo-Colo	La Serena
16:00	García 19'; Vidangossy 21'; Meneses 40'; Sánchez Sotelo 86'	Report		Stadium: La Portada; Attendance: 11,330; Referee: Claudio Fuenzalida

16 October 2011 Week 12	Universidad Católica	4–0	Colo-Colo	Las Condes, Santiago
16:00	Mirošević 15', 33'; F. Gutiérrez 41'; Cereceda 43'	Report		Stadium: San Carlos de Apoquindo; Attendance: 10,000; Referee: Eduardo Gamboa

23 October 2011 Week 13	Colo-Colo	3–1	Santiago Morning	Macul, Santiago
18:30	Fuenzalida 43'; Vilches 61'; Olivi 71' (pen.)	Report	Silva 39'	Stadium: Monumental; Attendance: 25,059; Referee: Patricio Polic

30 October 2011 Week 14	Colo-Colo	2–2	Universidad de Chile	Macul, Santiago
17:00	Paredes 45+2' (pen.), 59'; J. Castillo (red card) 73'	Report	Aránguiz 5' (pen.) (red card) 31'; González (red card) 44'; Molinas 90+10' (o.g.)	Stadium: Monumental; Attendance: 40,306; Referee: Claudio Puga

6 November 2011 Week 15	O'Higgins	2–0	Colo-Colo	Rancagua
16:00	Pinto 29', 32'	Report	R. Gutiérrez (red card) 44'	Stadium: El Teniente; Attendance: 7,199; Referee: Enrique Osses

19 November 2011 Week 16	Deportes Iquique	1–1	Colo-Colo	Iquique
16:00	Á. Ramos 56'	Report	Salgado 79'	Stadium: Tierra de Campeones; Attendance: 9,485; Referee: Eduardo Ponce

26 November 2011 Week 17	Colo-Colo	2–1	Ñublense	Macul, Santiago
20:00	Wilchez 46'; Fuenzalida 84'	Report	Montesinos 58'	Stadium: Monumental; Attendance: 0 Referee: Christian Rojas
Note: The match was played behind closed doors following an incident in the match against Universidad de Chile, in which fans of the Garra Blanca entered the visitors' dressing room in order to attack their rival players.

Results summary

Overall								Home						Away					
Pld	W	D	L	GF	GA	GD	Pts	W	D	L	GF	GA	GD	W	D	L	GF	GA	GD
17	9	3	5	27	28	−1	30	6	2	0	21	10	+11	3	1	5	6	18	−12

Last updated: 2011.
Source: cdf.cl

Result round by round

Round	1	2	3	4	5	6	7	8	9	10	11	12	13	14	15	16	17
Ground	A	H	A	H	H	A	H	A	A	H	A	A	H	H	A	A	H
Result	W	W	L	D	W	W	W	L	W	W	L	L	W	D	L	D	W
Position	4	2	5	5	3	2	2	2	2	2	2	2	2	2	4	5	3

Source: cdf.cl
A = Away; H = Home; W = Win; D = Draw; L = Loss

==== Torneo Clausura (play-offs) ====
Quarter-finals

3 December 2011 Leg 1	Deportes La Serena	2–6	Colo-Colo	La Serena
16:30 (CLST)	García 2'; Pezzarossi 25'	Report	Paredes 11', 57'; Wilchez 18', 28'; Gutiérrez 72'; Muñoz 90'	Stadium: La Portada; Attendance: 8,355; Referee: Manuel Acosta

10 December 2011 Leg 2	Colo-Colo	3–1 (9–3 agg.)	Deportes La Serena	Macul, Santiago
18:15 (CLST)	Gutiérrez 26', 76'; Muñoz 90'	Report	Pezzarossi 36'	Stadium: Monumental; Attendance: 24,209; Referee: Carlos Ulloa

Semi-finals

17 December 2011 Leg 1	Colo-Colo	2–3	Cobreloa	Macul, Santiago
19:00 (CLST)	Fuenzalida 18'; Paredes 88'	Report	Elizondo 21'; Roco 60'; Trecco 90+3'	Stadium: Monumental; Attendance: 36,623; Referee: Jorge Osorio

20 December 2011 Leg 2	Cobreloa	1–2 (4a–4 agg.)	Colo-Colo	Calama
18:00 (CLST)	Barrios 80'	Report	Muñoz 14'; Paredes 24'	Stadium: Municipal; Attendance: 9,837; Referee: Eduardo Gamboa

==== Copa Chile ====
Colo-Colo finished in 21st position (of 36 teams) with 8 points, being eliminated from the tournament as they were placed outside the Top 8.

25 June 2011 Matchday 2	Colo-Colo	0–3	Universidad Católica	Macul, Santiago
17:00 (CLT)		Report	N. Castillo 31', 72'; Pizarro 53'	Stadium: Monumental

9 July 2011 Matchday 4	Colo-Colo	4–1	Lota Schwager	Macul, Santiago
17:00 (CLT)	Medel 3'; Fuenzalida 24'; Villanueva 32'; Wilchez 72'	Report	Vladimir Herrera 50'	Stadium: Monumental

13 July 2011 Matchday 3	Deportes Concepción	1–1	Colo-Colo	Concepción
19:00 (CLT)	Figueroa 48'	Report	Medel 24'	Stadium: Collao

16 July 2011 Matchday 5	Universidad Católica	0–0	Colo-Colo	Ñuñoa, Santiago
15:00 (CLT)				Stadium: Nacional

21 July 2011 Matchday 1	Lota Schwager	2–1	Colo-Colo	Concepción
19:00 (CLT)	Vladimir Herrera 22'; Gustavo Moreno 73'	Report	Gutiérrez 33'	Stadium: Collao
Note: The match was suspended at the 54th minute due to a fog. Play was resumed on 22 July.

24 July 2011 Matchday 6	Colo-Colo	3–2	Deportes Concepción	Macul, Santiago
12:00 (CLT)	Fuenzalida 4'; Rieloff 15'; Gutiérrez 56'	Report	Alegría 63'; González 70' (pen.)	Stadium: Monumental

==== Friendly matches ====
3 February 2011 Copa Gato (summer)	Universidad de Chile	3–1	Colo-Colo	Temuco
22:15 (CLST)	Canales 21' (pen.); Rodríguez 36'; Díaz (red card) 88'; Rivarola 90+1'	Report	Paredes 14'; Wilchez (red card) 61'	Stadium: Germán Becker; Attendance: 15,000; Referee: Julio Bascuñán

10 August 2011 Copa Gato (winter)	Colo-Colo	3–1	Universidad Católica	Iquique
22:15 (CLT)	Muñoz 2'; Olivi 32'; Medel 50'	Report	Henríquez (red card) 45+2'; Pizarro 47'	Stadium: Tierra de Campeones; Attendance: 8,000; Referee: Jorge Osorio

6 October 2011 Copa de la Hermandad	Colo-Colo	0–0	(Peru) Alianza Lima	Macul, Santiago
19:00 (CLST)		Report		Stadium: Monumental; Referee: Julio Bascuñán

12 November 2011 International friendly	Colo-Colo	2–3	(Peru) Alianza Lima	Arica
22:15 (CLST)	Millar 69'; Olivi 81'	Report	Arroe 8', 13'; Fleitas 90+2'	Stadium: Carlos Dittborn; Attendance: 7,000
