= Mauro Olivi =

Argentine footballer

Personal information
- Full name: Mauro Andrés Olivi
- Date of birth: 18 March 1983 (age 43)
- Place of birth: Jacinto Aráuz, Argentina
- Height: 1.74 m (5 ft 9 in)
- Position: Striker

Youth career
- 2000–2003: Liniers

Senior career*
Years	Team	Apps	(Gls)
2003–2005	Liniers	94	(61)
2004–2005	→ Sporting (loan)	16	(8)
2005–2009	Olimpo	53	(49)
2010–2011	Audax Italiano	61	(22)
2011–2014	Colo-Colo	74	(15)
2014–2015	Audax Italiano	23	(3)
2015	León de Huánuco	15	(10)
2016	Selangor FA	25	(9)
2017–2018	Liniers	0	(0)
Total		361	(177)
- * Club domestic league appearances and goals

Mauro Andrés Olivi (Spanish pronunciation: [ˈmawɾo oˈliβi]; born 18 March 1983) is an Argentine former professional footballer. He played as striker or also as an attacking midfielder.

== Career ==
=== Early career ===
Olivi made his youth career at hometown club Liniers, where was promoted to the first-team in 2000, making his career debut in the Torneo Argentino A. Seasons later, Mauro was loaned to Sporting Punta Alta, scoring eight goals in 16 games during the 2004–05 season. After his loan spell at Punta Alta, he was hired by Olimpo, professional football team of the Primera División.

He made his professional debut in a 2–0 away win against Colón at Santa Fe.

=== Audax Italiano ===
On 6 July 2009, Audax Italiano signed Olivi for an undisclosed fee. He signed a five–year contract with the Chilean Primera División club. He made his league debut in a 1–0 win over Santiago Morning and his first goal came against Unión Española, in a 4−2 away win. In the debut season of Olivi in Chile scored 2 goals in 19 matches.

Olivi got off to a good start for the 2010 season scoring twice in Audax's opening league match against Ñublense. On 15 March, he scored another twice against Deportes La Serena in a 3−1 away win and in the next week scored in the loss against Universidad Católica after a very good free kick in the 13th minute. He incremented his tally goal during weeks thirteen and fourteen against Universidad de Concepción and Palestino. During FIFA World Cup break, with the likes of Matías Quiroga, Roberval and Cristian Canio all departing from the club in June, Olivi was inserted into the lead striker role. After forming a special relationship with Omar Labruna — new manager — he responded with important goals in games like the 2−2 draw with Universidad de Chile or the 3–1 victory over Colo-Colo. He ended the tournament with 18 goals behind midfielder Milovan Mirosevic with 20 goals, but in the 2010 ANFP awards, Olivi was awarded with the Golden Ball and was included in the Ideal Teams of El Gráfico and of the ANFP.

In the next season, Olivi had a very regular start of tournament, being red carded two times in his first games against Católica and Unión La Calera, but he scored two goals against Unión San Felipe and Santiago Morning in his first four games. However, he had a poor performance in the tournament scoring 2 goals in 12 appearances.

=== Colo-Colo ===
On 21 July 2011, Claudio Tessa — Audax's director of football — confirmed to the web page Emol that both clubs reached an agreement for Olivi's transfer to Colo-Colo, believed to be for around US$1 million. In the popular club, he reunited with Boris Rieloff, Marco Medel and Christian Vilches, his former teammates at Audax. He made his official debut against Santiago Wanderers at Estadio Monumental as substitute for Sebastián Toro. In a friendly game for the Copa Gato, Olivi scored the first goal of the 3–1 victory to Universidad Católica. On 23 October, the player scored his first goal for Colo-Colo in a 3–1 victory against Santiago Morning, which ended a run of 685 minutes of football without a goal. In December 2011, after the club's elimination in the playoffs against Cobreloa, was rumours that Olivi would be made available on a free transfer or be loaned due to the striker's poor performances.

After several speculations of his departure, Ivo Basay considered him in the pre–season at Temuco, despite his possibilities to go to a team on loan or also the chance to left Colo-Colo for a Brazilian Série A club or also an Asian side. On 25 February 2012, he scored his side's goal in a 2–1 defeat with Universidad de Concepción, generating thus improving his image, after a complicated last season, not obstant Basay failed to call-up Olivi for the next week game in Valparaíso against Wanderers. However, after the coach's departure, he was chosen by the caretaker Luis Pérez in the starting lineup, recovering his well performances, scoring goals in a 2–2 regular phase draw against Rangers and a twice with Deportes Iquique in the playoffs, being a key player during that instance, after being eliminated by the rival Universidad de Chile in the semifinals.

=== Return to Audax ===
In 2014, he returned to Audax Italiano.

=== León de Huánuco ===
In 2015, he joined León de Huánuco.

=== Selangor ===
In 2016, Olivi signed with Selangor from León de Huánuco, ahead of the upcoming Malaysia Super League season.

=== Liniers ===
In 2017 he joined Liniers.

He announced his retirement in 2018.

== Controversies ==
On 31 August 2011, Olivi was arrested by the police after physically assaulting his then girlfriend, dancer Valentina Roth. The events occurred at the footballer's apartment at 3:00 AM, where Roth had a violent discussion with the player. The dancer then called the police and Olivi was arrested, being visited by his club's general manager Jaime Pizarro at the police station. The same day that Pizarro visited Olivi it was revealed that the striker would be formalized at the court. Finally, he was sentenced with the prohibition of approaching Roth in a radius of 100 meters.

Some days later, he was linked once again to a TV personality, this time Vaithiare Muñoz of Chilevisión's youth program Yingo. After having been involved in several disciplinary events, Colo Colo's then coach Ivo Basay marginated him from the squad, which led to speculations that he might leave the club.

== Career statistics ==
Appearances and goals by club, season and competition
Club	Season	League		Cup		Continental		Other		Total	
Club	Season	Apps	Goals	Apps	Goals	Apps	Goals	Apps	Goals	Apps	Goals
Audax Italiano	2009–C	15	2	0	0	–	–	–	–	15	2
Audax Italiano	2010	34	18	0	0	–	–	3 (Note: Appearances in 2011 Liguilla Pre-Libertadores)	0	37	18
Audax Italiano	2011–A	12	2	–	–	–	–	–	–	12	2
Audax Italiano	Total	61	22	0	0	–	–	3	0	64	22
Colo-Colo	2011–C	16	1	–	–	–	–	–	–	16	1
Colo-Colo	2012	27	10	7	3	–	–	–	–	27	10
Colo-Colo	2013	12	2	0	0	–	–	–	–	12	1
Colo-Colo	2013–14	17	2	4	2	–	–	–	–	12	1
Colo-Colo	2014–15	0	0	5	2	–	–	–	–	12	1
Colo-Colo	Total	74	15	16	7	4	0	–	–	94	22
Audax Italiano	2014–15	23	3	0	0	–	–	–	–	23	3
Audax Italiano	Total	23	3	0	0	–	–	0	0	23	3
Career total		158	40	16	7	4	0	3	0	181	47

== Honours ==
Olimpo

- Primera B Nacional: 2006-07

Colo-Colo

- Primera División de Chile: 2014 Torneo Apertura
