= Marcelo Díaz =

Chilean footballer (born 1986)

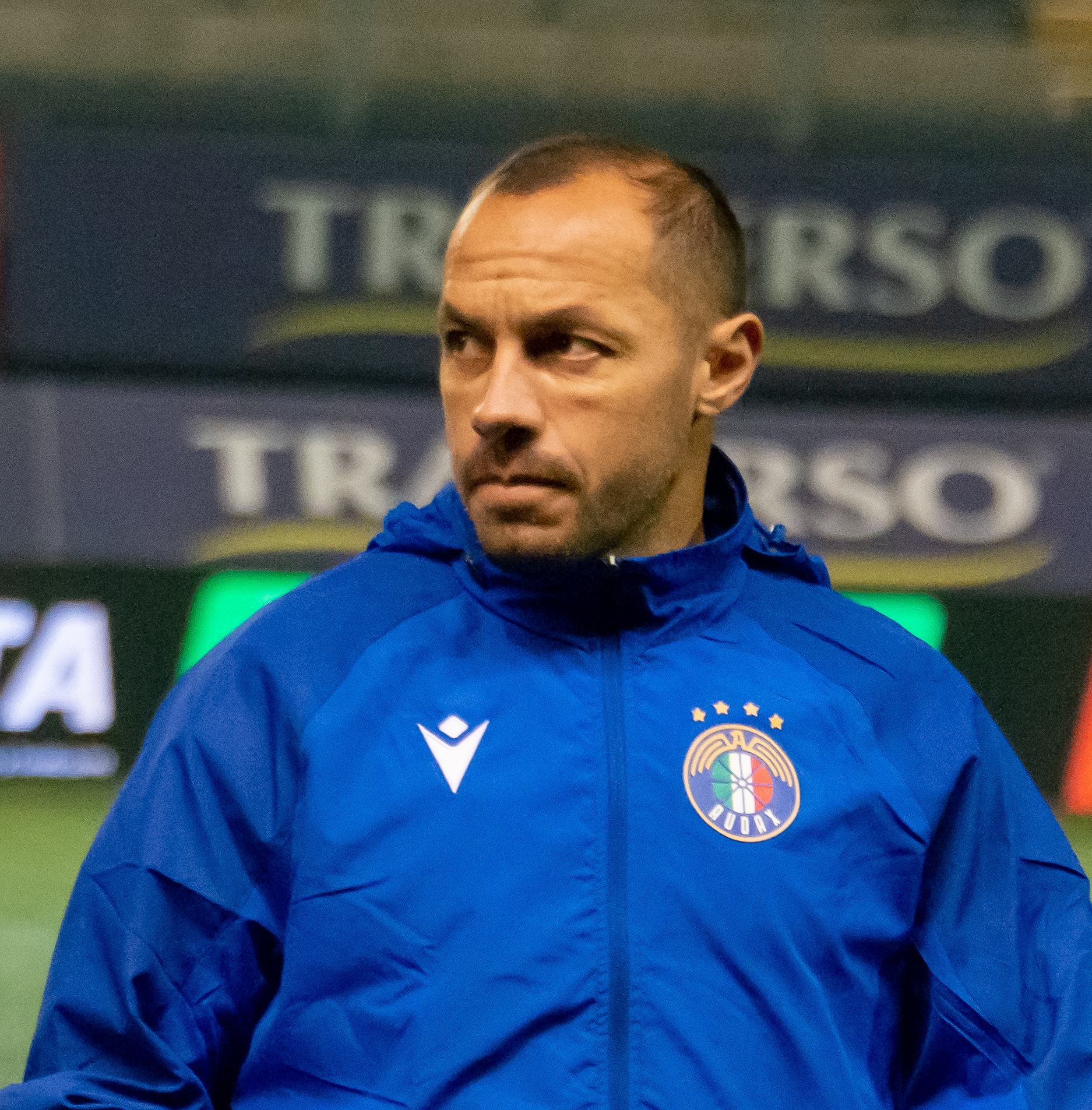
- Díaz with Audax Italiano in 2023

Personal information
- Full name: Marcelo Alfonso Díaz Rojas
- Date of birth: 30 December 1986 (age 39)
- Place of birth: Santiago, Chile
- Height: 1.65 m (5 ft 5 in)
- Position: Central midfielder

Team information
- Current team: Universidad de Chile
- Number: 21

Youth career
- 2002–2005: Universidad de Chile

Senior career*
Years	Team	Apps	(Gls)
2005–2012	Universidad de Chile	164	(4)
2010	→ Deportes La Serena (loan)	13	(5)
2012–2015	Basel	58	(7)
2015	Hamburger SV	19	(1)
2016–2017	Celta Vigo	40	(1)
2017–2018	Pumas UNAM	31	(5)
2018–2021	Racing Club	36	(1)
2021–2022	Libertad	21	(0)
2023	Audax Italiano	21	(0)
2024–	Universidad de Chile	43	(0)

International career^{‡}
2005	Chile U20	7	(0)
2011–2025	Chile	62	(1)
Medal record
Representing Chile
Winner	Copa América	2015
Winner	Copa América Centenario	2016
Runner-up	FIFA Confederations Cup	2017
- * Club domestic league appearances and goals as of 12 July 2025 ‡ National team caps and goals as of 8 February 2025

Marcelo Alfonso Díaz Rojas (Spanish pronunciation: [maɾˈselo ˈði.as]; born 30 December 1986) is a Chilean professional footballer who plays as a central midfielder for Liga de Primera club Universidad de Chile.

Díaz came through Universidad de Chile youth academy, and was promoted to the first team in 2004, when he was 18. Making over 150 appearances Díaz was an integral part of the team with the club that won five titles including three consecutive national championships and the 2011 Copa Sudamericana; the club's first international title. In 2012, he moved to Swiss side Basel, where he won two consecutive league titles, before moving to Hamburger SV in 2015.

Díaz has earned over 60 caps for Chile since his senior debut in 2011, and represented the nation at the 2014 FIFA World Cup as well as the 2015 Copa América, winning the latter while being named in the Team of the tournament.

Díaz has earned the nickname of "South American Xavi", as both of them have a great ball control capabilities and excellent passing skills. In June 2015, he scored a 91st minute free-kick goal that helped save Hamburger SV from its first ever relegation from the Bundesliga and is considered to be one of the most important goals in the club's 128-year history.

== Club career ==
=== Universidad de Chile ===
==== Early years ====
Díaz began his career in Universidad de Chile youth academy, being immediately accepted by Jorge Cabrera, then coach of the club's lower divisions. He played in the Club Julio Covarrubias of Padre Hurtado before arriving to Universidad de Chile, with Díaz saying that he felt kind of lucky for being accepted in the club, because he was a very low profile player. He progressed over all categories in the lower divisions, mainly acting as a playmaker. He was promoted to the first team in 2004 at the age of 18, but he was only called to three matches and not debuted in any of them. The next season, Díaz made his professional debut in a 3–2 loss with Everton for the first week of the 2005 Apertura Tournament. In the 2006 season, he played 29 matches between the Apertura and the Clausura Tournament.

After the one season, in the Apertura Tournament 2008, Díaz was a frequently starter in the squad of Arturo Salah, and scored his first professional goal with the club on 23 March, in a 3–2 loss with Huachipato, it was his first goal for Universidad de Chile. During the year he played 36 games between the Apertura and Clausura tournaments. After of the departure of Arturo Salah and the arrival of the Uruguayan coach Sergio Markarián, Díaz was used as a left back, unlike Salah that used him as an attacking midfielder. On 28 January 2009, he scored his first international goal in a 1–0 home victory to Pachuca. In the first semester of the season he won his first professional title, the Apertura Tournament, that his club won after beating 1–0 Unión Española in the playoffs final. The next season, now with the arrival of Gerardo Pelusso as the coach, Díaz was being used as right back and only played five league games.

On 13 August 2010, the player confirmed his incorporation to Deportes La Serena. There, he returned to the midfield, being deployed as an attacking midfielder. On 22 August, Díaz debuted in a 4–0 home win over Santiago Wanderers at La Portada Stadium. In his third match for the club against Audax Italiano, he scored his side's goal in a 2–1 defeat in the 86th minute. On 3 October, Díaz scored a brace in a 3–3 draw with Everton, being red carded in the 91st minute. After a one match absence, and his return in the game against Unión Española, he again scored his side's goal in a 2–1 away defeat with Universidad Católica. On 28 November, Díaz had a successful performance against Cobresal, being named the man-of-the-match and scoring a goal in a 2–0 win. Having finished the 2010 season, Díaz had a deal with Huachipato for a loan, but Universidad de Chile's new coach Jorge Sampaoli wanted him to play for his team in 2011 and the player remained in the club.

==== Breakthrough seasons ====
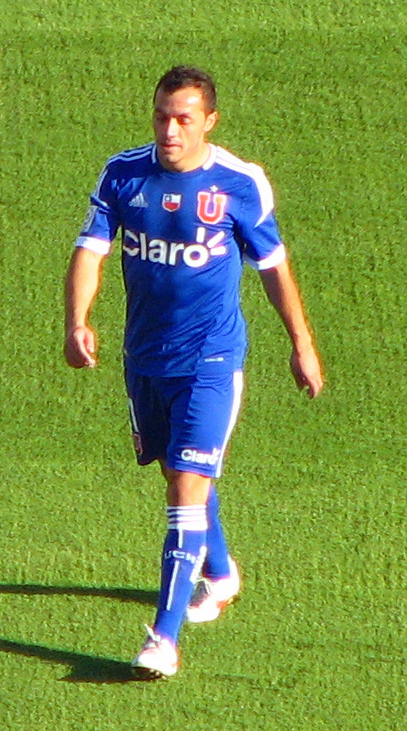
Díaz playing for Universidad de Chile in 2012.

Díaz began the season as a substitute player replacing to Guillermo Marino in all second halves of a game, but due to his good performances, he ended up replacing Marino on the starting lineup. On 4 June 2011, he scored a wonderful 26-yard free-kick versus O'Higgins, in Universidad de Chile's amazing 7–1 rout for the playoff's semi-final. Following the title obtained in the Apertura Tournament and the departure of Felipe Seymour to Italian Serie A side Genoa, Díaz started to play in Seymour's former position in the starting lineup as a central midfielder, with a more defensive role.

When the Clausura Tournament began, former Universidad de Chile midfielder Manuel Iturra was heavy linked with the club, to replace to Seymour, but Sampaoli decided finally against Iturra and for Díaz, who with the given confidence stepped up his game and became one of the key players of the team. His great performances in the local tournament and in the 2011 Copa Sudamericana caught the eye of national team's coach Claudio Borghi to play in the 2014 World Cup qualifiers. On 19 October, Díaz played in the Copa Sudamericana's round of 16 match against Flamengo. In that match, Universidad de Chile historically beat 4–0 as visitors, something never done by a Chilean team. In the second leg match, Díaz scored the only goal of the game in a 1–0 win at Estadio Nacional, winning the man of the match award. The next game of his club against the rivals, Colo-Colo, and he again was the man of the match in a 2–2 away draw. In that same match, Díaz was punished by the Anfp for obscene gestures to the Garra Blanca, the barra brava of Colo-Colo. After his performances, he was called up by Borghi for play against the Uruguay national football team at Centenario Stadium for the World Cup qualifiers. On 23 November, for the semi-finals of the Copa Sudamericana against Vasco da Gama, Díaz played in a 1–1 away draw at São Januário Stadium. He played an important role in the match, winning important balls in the middle of the pitch and assisting Osvaldo González, with a free kick to score the equalizing goal in the 79th minute. In the second leg game against the Brazilians, Díaz was named once again the man of the match in a 2–0 win. In the next game against LDU Quito for the first leg final, he made another assist to Eduardo Vargas, who scored the only goal of game. On 14 December, in the final of the tournament, Díaz played a good role in a 3–0 win over LDU, being crowned as the best champion of this tournament. According to the South American media, they compared to Universidad de Chile with Barcelona and Díaz with Xavi. Winning the Clausura Tournament, Universidad de Chile made a successful season earning three titles in one year, with Díaz as one of the key players of the season along with Johnny Herrera, Eduardo Vargas, Marcos González and José Rojas.

On 4 January 2012, the club received a US$1.5 million bid of Argentine Primera División side Newell's Old Boys for Díaz, but the same player rejected the deal, to play the Copa Libertadores, being also retained with pay rise of part of directive. He was candidate for be the club's captain, with the departures of José Rojas and Marcos González to the Brazilian Série A, but finally with the return of Rojas to the club because of problems with his new contract, Pepe remained as captain. Díaz started the season of fine form scoring a penalty goal in a 3–1 win over his old club Deportes La Serena in the first game of Universidad de Chile at the Apertura Tournament. On 25 February, he missed a penalty kick against O'Higgins in a 3–0 loss, that was saved by the adversary's keeper Luis Marín for the fifth week of the Apertura. On 10 March, he played a great match giving two notable assists in a 6–0 thrashing over Audax Italiano, then being called up by Borghi to the national team for play the Copa del Pacífico against Peru at Arica and Tacna. On 4 April, he was named the man of the match in a Libertadores 1–0 victory over Godoy Cruz at Mendoza, making another excellent match for his team on 29 April in the Chilean derby against Colo-Colo, in where he scored the first goal of the game and also made three assists, after a successful free kick in a 5–0 home win at the Estadio Nacional. On 9 May, was confirmed that Díaz was sold to Swiss Super League side Basel for $4 million. On 11 May, he scored a 30-yard goal in a 6–0 rout over Deportivo Quito for the Libertadores.

=== FC Basel ===
After winning the Apertura with Universidad de Chile, Díaz joined the Swiss side Basel in the summer of 2012, on a four-year deal. He joined Basel's first team during their 2012–13 season under head coach Heiko Vogel. Díaz played his club debut on 17 July in the 2–0 away win against Flora Tallinn in the 1st Leg of the second qualifying round to the 2012–13 UEFA Champions League and he received good compliments. He played his domestic league debut for the club in the home game in the St. Jakob-Park four days later, on 21 July 2012, as Basel played a 2–2 draw with Luzern. Another three days later, on 24 July, Díaz scored his first goal for his new team during the return leg against Flora Tallinn. It was a direct free kick and it was the final goal in the team's 3–0 win. He scored his first league goal for them during the 2–1 away win in the Stade Olympique de la Pontaise against Lausanne-Sport on 17 February 2013.

At the end of the Swiss Super League season 2012–13 he won the Championship title with the team. In the 2012–13 Swiss Cup Basel reached the final, but were runners up behind Grasshopper Club, being defeated 4–3 on penalties, following a 1–1 draw after extra time. Basel had started in the 2012–13 UEFA Champions League in the qualifying rounds. But were knocked out of the competition by CFR Cluj in the play-off round. They then continued in the 2012–13 UEFA Europa League group stage. Ending the group in second position, Basel continued in the knockout phase. Winning in the round of 32 against Dnipro Dnipropetrovsk, Basel were matched against Zenit St. Petersburg in the round of 16. Following a 2–0 home win, the second leg was played in the Petrovsky Stadium. The home team took a goal lead in the 30th minute and after his second yellow card in the 44th minute Diaz was dismissed, but Basel held the result and advanced. Beating Tottenham Hotspur in a thrilling quarter-final, 4–4 on aggregate then 4–1 on penalties, Basel advanced as far as the semi-finals, there being matched against the reigning UEFA Champions League holders Chelsea. Chelsea won both games advancing 5–2 on aggregate, eventually winning the competition.

At the start of their 2013–14 season, Díaz was a member of the Basel team that won the 2013 Uhrencup, beating Red Star Belgrade in the final. Basel joined the 2013–14 Champions League in the qualifying rounds and they advanced to the group stage. Finishing in third place in their group, Basel qualified for Europa League knockout phase and here they advanced as far as the quarter-finals. But eventually they were beaten by Valencia 5–3 on aggregate, after extra time. At the end of the 2013–14 Super League season Díaz won his second league championship with Basel. The team also reached the final of the Swiss Cup on 21 April 2014. Gastón Sauro and Giovanni Sio were both sent off as Basel fell to rivals FC Zürich 2–0 in added extra time, after a goalless 90 minutes.

The 2014–15 season was also a successful one for Basel, but for Díaz it was an unlucky and unthankful season under their new trainer Paulo Sousa. Despite the fact that Basel won the championship later that season and despite the fact that Basel had entered the Champions League in the group stage reaching the knockout phase on 9 December 2014 as they managed a 1–1 draw at Anfield against Liverpool, Díaz totaled just 24 appearances, the larger part as substitute, during the first half of the season, 13 (from 18) League, 2 Cup (of 3), and just 3 (of 6) in the Champions League, as well 6 further appearances in test games. Because Sousa did not rely upon Díaz, he was forced to leave the club during the winter break.

On 2 February 2015 Basel announced that Díaz had joined Hamburger SV. During his time with the club, Díaz played a total of 118 games for Basel scoring a total of 15 goals. 58 of these games were in the Swiss Super League, 10 in the Swiss Cup, 51 in the UEFA competitions (Champions League and Europa League) and 19 were friendly games. He scored seven goals in the domestic league, two in the cup, four in the European games and the other two were scored during the test games.

=== Hamburger SV ===
On 2 February 2015, Díaz signed for German Bundesliga club Hamburger SV on a three-and-a-half-year deal. On 1 June 2015, he scored his first goal for the club in its relegation play-off match which took place at the end of the 2014–15 Bundesliga season, against Karlsruher SC. Many Hamburg fans consider Díaz's 91st minute free-kick goal which helped save Hamburg from its first ever relegation to be one of the most important goals ever scored in the club's 128-year history. After the match, it was revealed that Rafael van der Vaart, Hamburg's captain and first choice for free-kicks, was to take the kick. Diaz, however, spontaneously told Van der Vaart that he could take a shot "tomorrow, my friend" and went on to perform the free-kick himself.

=== Celta de Vigo ===
In January 2016, Díaz transferred to Spanish La Liga side Celta de Vigo. He scored his first goal for the club on 16 April 2017, in a 3–0 away win against Granada CF.

On 17 August 2017, Díaz left Celta by mutual consent.

=== Pumas UNAM ===
On 17 August 2017, Díaz signed a contract with Liga MX side Pumas UNAM as a free agent.

=== Libertad ===
In June 2021, Paraguay's D10 announced that would join Libertad. In July 2021, the announcement was made official by the club.

=== Last years ===
On 13 August 2026, Díaz announced his retirement at the end of the 2026 season.

== International career ==
=== Youth ===
In January 2005, aged 19, Díaz caught the attention of José Sulantay, who called up the player to play the South American Youth Championship held in Colombia. He made his U-20 debut during the championship. Following the qualification of the Chilean national youth team to the 2005 FIFA World Youth Championship, he was in the 23-man squad to play the world championship, but he didn't play during the tournament.

=== Senior ===
Six years after his participation with the U-20 team, on 7 September 2011, Díaz was called up by Claudio Borghi to play in the 2014 World Cup qualification against Uruguay and Paraguay, in place of Carlos Carmona, who was banned for his participation in the scandal of "Bautizazo". On 11 November, Díaz officially debuted for the Chile senior team in a 4–0 away loss at Centenario Stadium, being replaced by Milovan Mirosevic in the 61st minute. Due to his good performances for Universidad de Chile, he was called up for the match against Ghana at PPL Park, in where he played well in a 1–1 draw. He started again the qualifiers against Bolivia and Venezuela, both 2–0 away victories, where Díaz excelled.

==== 2015 Copa América ====
Díaz started all six matches in the 2015 Copa América, helping Chile win in a penalty shootout against Argentina, to win their first major international honor. For his performances he was named in the Team of the tournament.

== Personal life ==
Still a player of Universidad de Chile, Díaz graduated as a football manager at INAF (National Institute of Football, Sports and Physical Activity of Chile) in December 2024.

== Career statistics ==
=== Club ===
As of match played 16 July 2025

Appearances and goals by club, season and competition
Club	Season	League			National cup		Continental		Other		Total	
Club	Season	Division	Apps	Goals	Apps	Goals	Apps	Goals	Apps	Goals	Apps	Goals
Universidad de Chile	2005	Chilean Primera División	4	0	0	0	—		—		4	0
Universidad de Chile	2006	Chilean Primera División	29	0	0	0	—		—		29	0
Universidad de Chile	2007	Chilean Primera División	37	0	0	0	—		—		37	0
Universidad de Chile	2008	Chilean Primera División	15	1	1	0	—		—		16	1
Universidad de Chile	2009	Chilean Primera División	23	0	1	0	13 (Note: Nine appearances and one goal in Copa Libertadores, four appearances in Copa Sudamericana)	1	—		37	1
Universidad de Chile	2010	Chilean Primera División	5	0	2	0	2 (Note: Appearances in Copa Libertadores)	0	—		9	0
Universidad de Chile	2011	Chilean Primera División	33	1	4	0	11 (Note: Appearances in Copa Sudamericana)	1	1 (Note: Appearance in Copa Sudamericana play-offs)	0	49	2
Universidad de Chile	2012	Chilean Primera División	18	2	0	0	12	2	—		30	4
Universidad de Chile	Total		164	4	8	0	38	4	1	0	211	8
Deportes La Serena (loan)	2010	Chilean Primera División	13	5	—		—		—		13	5
Basel	2012–13	Swiss Super League	26	4	5	1	17 (Note: Six appearances and one goal in UEFA Champions League, eleven appearances and one goal in UEFA Europa League)	2	0	0	48	7
Basel	2013–14	Swiss Super League	19	2	3	1	11 (Note: Eight appearances and two goals in UEFA Champions League, three appearances in UEFA Europa League)	2	0	0	33	5
Basel	2014–15	Swiss Super League	13	1	2	0	3 (Note: Appearances in UEFA Champions League)	0	0	0	18	1
Basel	Total		58	7	10	2	31	4	0	0	99	9
Hamburger SV	2014–15	Bundesliga	6	0	0	0	—		2 (Note: Appearances in Relegation play-offs)	1	8	1
Hamburger SV	2015–16	Bundesliga	11	0	1	0	—		—		12	0
Hamburger SV	Total		17	0	1	0	—		2	1	20	1
Celta Vigo	2015–16	La Liga	14	0	2	0	—		—		16	0
Celta Vigo	2016–17	La Liga	26	1	8	1	5 (Note: Appearances in UEFA Europa League)	0	—		39	2
Celta Vigo	Total		40	1	10	1	5	0	—		55	2
Pumas UNAM	2017–18	Liga MX	30	3	1	0	—		—		31	3
Pumas UNAM	2018–19	Liga MX	1	0	1	1	—		—		2	1
Pumas UNAM	Total		31	3	2	1	—		—		33	4
Racing Club	2018–19	Argentine Primera División	19	0	4	0	1	0	1 (Note: Appearance in Trofeo de Campeones de la Superliga Argentina)	0	25	0
Racing Club	2019–20	Argentine Primera División	16	1	0	0	4	0	1 (Note: Appearance in 2020 Copa Maradona)	0	21	1
Racing Club	Total		35	1	4	0	5	0	2	0	46	1
Club Libertad	2021	Paraguayan Primera División	1	0	—		2	0	—		3	0
Club Libertad	2022	Paraguayan Primera División	20	0	0	0	2	0	—		22	0
Club Libertad	Total		21	0	0	0	4	0	—		25	0
Audax Italiano	2023	Chilean Primera División	21	0	0	0	9	0	—		30	0
Universidad de Chile	2024	Chilean Primera División	29	0	4	0	—		—		33	0
Universidad de Chile	2025	Chilean Primera División	14	0	6	0	7 (Note: Six appearances in Copa Libertadores, one appearance in Copa Sduamericana)	0	—		27	0
Universidad de Chile	Total		43	0	10	0	7	0	—		60	0
Career total			417	20	37	3	91	8	5	1	553	32

=== International ===
As of match played 8 February 2025

Appearances and goals by national team and year
National team	Year	Apps	Goals
Chile	2011	1	0
Chile	2012	8	0
Chile	2013	10	0
Chile	2014	12	1
Chile	2015	11	0
Chile	2016	10	0
Chile	2017	9	0
Chile	2025	1	0
Total		62	1

Scores and results list Chile's goal tally first.

#	Date	Venue	Opponent	Score	Result	Competition
1	30 May 2014	Estadio Nacional Julio Martínez Prádanos, Santiago, Chile	Egypt	1–2	3–2	Friendly

== Honours ==
Universidad de Chile

- Chilean Primera División: 2009 Apertura, 2011 Apertura, 2011 Clausura, 2012 Apertura
- Copa Sudamericana: 2011

Basel

- Swiss Super League: 2012–13, 2013–14
- Swiss Cup runner-up: 2012–13, 2013–14

Racing Club

- Superliga Argentina: 2018–19
- Trofeo de Campeones: 2019

Libertad

- Paraguayan Primera División: 2022 Apertura

Chile

- Copa América: 2015, 2016
- FIFA Confederations Cup runner-up: 2017
- Copa del Pacífico: 2012

Individual

- Primera División de Chile Team of the Season : 2011
- Copa América Team of the Tournament: 2015.

== Career statistics ==
=== International ===
As of match played 8 February 2025

Appearances and goals by national team and year
National team	Year	Apps	Goals
Chile	2011	1	0
Chile	2012	8	0
Chile	2013	10	0
Chile	2014	12	1
Chile	2015	11	0
Chile	2016	10	0
Chile	2017	9	0
Chile	2025	1	0
Total		62	1

Chile score listed first, score column indicates score after each Brereton goal

List of international goals scored by Marcelo Díaz
No.	Date	Venue	Opponent	Score	Result	Competition
1	30 May 2014	Egypt	1–2	3–2	Friendly	
