= Villanueva (surname) =

Villanueva is a Spanish surname. Notable people with the surname include:

- Alejandro Villanueva (footballer) (1908–1944), Peruvian football (soccer) player
- Alejandro Villanueva (American football) (born 1988), American Football Player for Pittsburgh Steelers
- Alex Villanueva, American law enforcement officer, Los Angeles County sheriff since 2018
- Alex Villanueva (soccer) (born 2002), American soccer player
- Anthony Villanueva (1945–2014), Filipino boxer, represented Philippines in Olympics
- Antonio Villanueva (born 1940), Mexican runner
- Armando Villanueva (1915–2013), Peruvian politician, full name Armando Villanueva del Campo
- Carlos Villanueva (baseball) (born 1983), Dominican professional baseball player in USA
- Carlos Villanueva (footballer) (born 1986), Chilean football (soccer) player
- Carlos Raúl Villanueva (1900–1975), Venezuelan architect
- Cesar L. Villanueva, Philippine attorney and professor
- Charlie Villanueva (born 1984), Dominican-American basketball player for the NBA
- Christian Villanueva (born 1991), Mexican professional baseball player
- Danny Villanueva (1937–2015), American football kicker for the NFL
- Darío Villanueva, Spanish literary critic
- Eddie Villanueva (Eduardo Villanueva, born 1946), religious and political figure in the Philippines
- Eduar Villanueva (born 1984), Venezuelan Olympic middle distance runner
- Edgar David Villanueva, Peruvian congressman
- Enrico Villanueva, Filipino professional basketball player in the Philippines
- Héctor Villanueva (born 1964), Puerto Rican professional baseball player in USA
- Idalis Villanueva, American engineering educator from Puerto Rico
- José Villanueva, amateur boxer from the Philippines
- Joaquín Lorenzo Villanueva, Spanish priest, historian and writer.
- José Luis Villanueva (born 1981), Chilean football (soccer) player
- Juan de Villanueva (1739–1811), Spanish neoclassical architect
- Karen Villanueva (born 1998), Mexican rhythmic gymnast
- Laila Villanueva, American LGBTQ activist and military non-commissioned officer
- Lord Villanueva (born 1975), Filipino associate justice of the Sandiganbayan
- Mariana Villanueva (born 1964), Mexican composer
- Matthías Villanueva (born 1993), Chilean football (soccer) player
- Muriel Villanueva i Perarnau (born 1976), Spanish writer
- Nathanael Villanueva (born 1995), Filipino football (soccer) player
- Raul Villanueva (born 1963), Filipino associate justice of the Supreme Court
- Rene Villanueva (1954–2007), Filipino author published in the Philippines
- Ron Villanueva (born 1970), American politician serving in the Virginia House of Delegates
- Sal Villanueva, American record producer (1999–2007)
- Vicente Villanueva (1924–2014), Peruvian footballer
