= Cristóbal Jorquera =

Chilean footballer (born 1988)

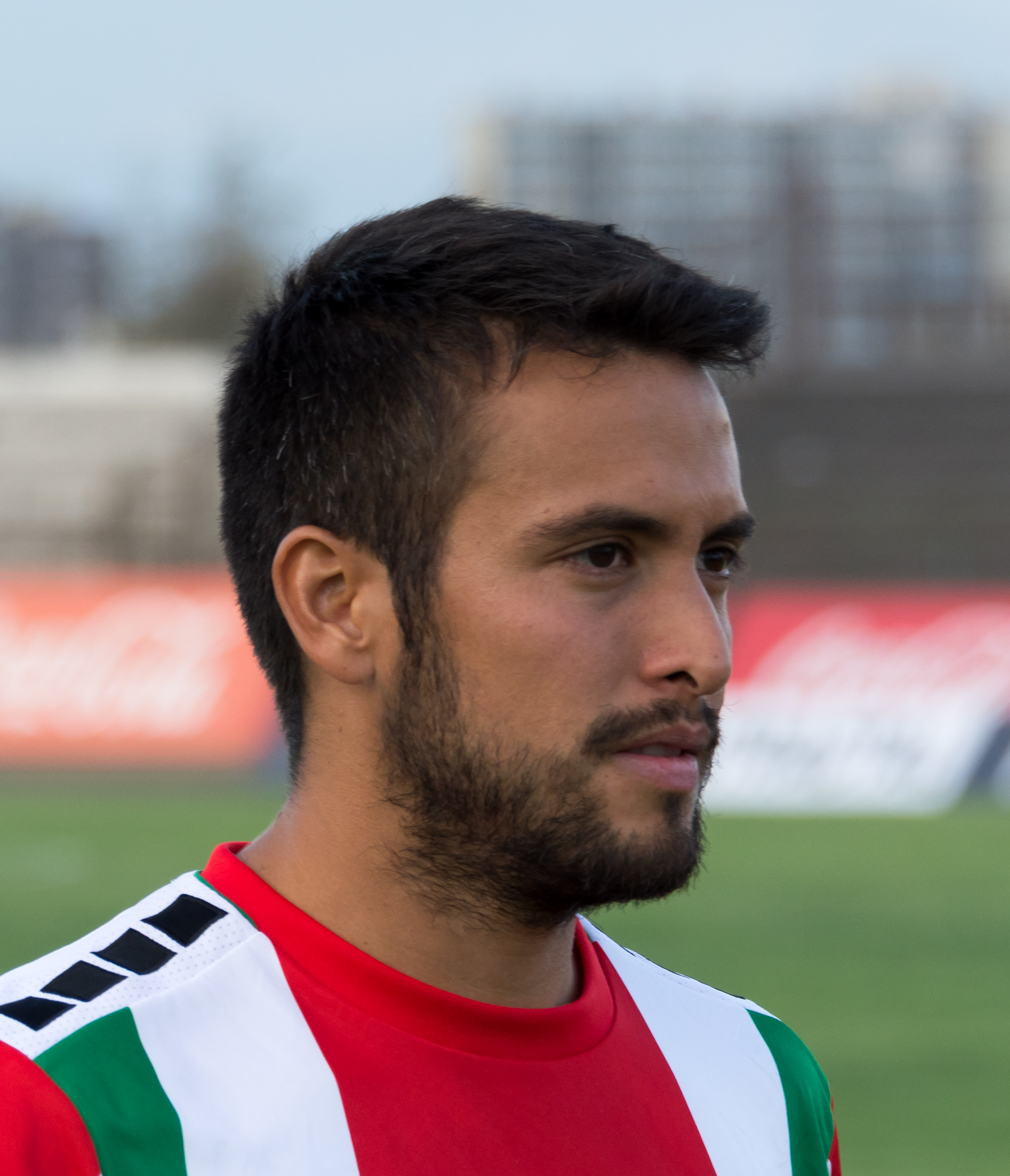
- Jorquera with Palestino in 2019

Personal information
- Full name: Cristóbal Andrés Jorquera Torres
- Date of birth: 4 August 1988 (age 38)
- Place of birth: Santiago, Chile
- Height: 1.74 m (5 ft 8 1/2 in)
- Position: Midfielder

Team information
- Current team: Magallanes
- Number: 10

Youth career
- Colo-Colo

Senior career*
| Years | Team | Apps | (Gls) |
| 2006–2011 | Colo-Colo | 64 | (14) |
| 2007 | → Ñublense (loan) | 6 | (0) |
| 2007 | → Unión Española (loan) | 14 | (0) |
| 2009 | → O'Higgins (loan) | 30 | (3) |
| 2011–2013 | Genoa | 35 | (2) |
| 2013–2015 | Parma | 17 | (1) |
| 2013–2014 | → Eskişehirspor (loan) | 22 | (4) |
| 2015–2018 | Bursaspor | 64 | (8) |
| 2019–2020 | Palestino | 19 | (3) |
| 2020–2021 | Fatih Karagümrük | 9 | (5) |
| 2021 | Bursaspor | 2 | (0) |
| 2022 | Deportes La Serena | 15 | (0) |
| 2023–2024 | Magallanes | 47 | (9) |
| 2025 | Rangers | 12 | (0) |
| 2026– | Magallanes | 0 | (0) |

International career
| 2009–2010 | Chile U20 | 2 | (0) |
| 2009–2012 | Chile | 4 | (0) |
- * Club domestic league appearances and goals as of 10 February 2026

Cristóbal Andrés Jorquera Torres (born 4 August 1988) is a Chilean footballer who plays as a midfielder for Magallanes.

== Club career ==
He began his career at Chilean giants Colo-Colo, being promoted to first team in 2006, when the club was led by Claudio Borghi. Nevertheless, the following season Jorquera was loaned to Ñublense, freshly promoted to top-tier.

After a season on loan at Ñublense and Unión Española, he returned to Colo-Colo in 2008 and with Borghi still in the bench, Jorquera settled as starter player. On 20 March 2008, he scored his first competitive goal for the club in a 2–0 home win over Boca Juniors for the Copa Libertadores. After being eclipsed with Macnelly Torres arrival and Borghi's departure, Jorquera wasn't considered by Marcelo Barticciotto and was loaned to O'Higgins F.C. for gain experience.

Following a regular season with O'Higgins, he returned to Colo-Colo as back-up of Macnelly Torres. Nevertheless, he ended up winning the post to Torres with Diego Cagna as coach. For the 2011 season and the definitive departure of Macnelly from the club, Jorquera was an undisputed player in the Apertura and in the Copa Libertadores.

On 31 August 2011, Jorquera joined Serie A side Genoa in four-year contract, after being sold in €2,6 million during May of the same year. For the 2013–14 season, he was loaned to Turkey's Eskişehirspor, completing 4 goals in 22 appearances. After ending his spell at Turkey as well as his contract with Genoa, Jorquera joined Parma F.C. to face the 2014–15 league season. However, he only managed to score a goal in 17 appearances because in December 2014 he injured in his left foot, so that he missed the rest of the tournament.

Following Parma's bankruptcy (and a successor club re-founded in Serie D), on 18 July 2015, it was confirmed that Jorquera joined Bursaspor, thereby returning to Turkey.

In 2023 and 2024, Jorquera played for Magallanes. In March 2025, he switched to Rangers de Talca. The next year, he returned to Magallanes.

== International career ==
He has earned four caps for Chile.

== Honours ==
Colo-Colo

- Primera División de Chile (2): 2006 Apertura, 2006 Clausura
- Copa Sudamericana: Runner-up 2006

== Career statistics ==
| Season | Club | League | | Cup | | Continental | | Total | |
| Season | Club | Apps | Goals | Apps | Goals | Apps | Goals | Apps | Goals |
|---|---|---|---|---|---|---|---|---|---|
| Colo-Colo | 2006 | 10 | 0 | — | | 2 | 0 | 12 | 0 |
| Colo-Colo | 2008 | 30 | 4 | 0 | 0 | 4 | 1 | 34 | 5 |
| Colo-Colo | 2010 | 18 | 6 | 0 | 0 | 2 | 0 | 20 | 6 |
| Colo-Colo | 2011 | 17 | 4 | 0 | 0 | 5 | 2 | 22 | 6 |
| Colo-Colo | Total | 74 | 14 | 0 | 0 | 13 | 3 | 87 | 17 |
| Ñublense (loan) | 2007 | 14 | 1 | — | | — | | 14 | 1 |
| Ñublense (loan) | Total | 14 | 1 | — | | — | | 14 | 1 |
| Unión Española (loan) | 2007 | 15 | 0 | — | | — | | 15 | 0 |
| Unión Española (loan) | Total | 15 | 0 | — | | — | | 15 | 0 |
| O'Higgins (loan) | 2009 | 30 | 3 | 1 | 0 | — | | 31 | 3 |
| O'Higgins (loan) | Total | 30 | 3 | 1 | 0 | — | | 31 | 3 |
| Genoa | 2011–12 | 22 | 4 | 2 | 1 | — | | 24 | 5 |
| Genoa | 2012–13 | 13 | 0 | 0 | 0 | — | | 13 | 0 |
| Genoa | Total | 35 | 4 | 2 | 1 | — | | 37 | 5 |
| Eskişehirspor (loan) | 2013–14 | 22 | 4 | 9 | 2 | — | | 31 | 6 |
| Eskişehirspor (loan) | Total | 22 | 4 | 9 | 2 | — | | 31 | 6 |
| Parma | 2014–15 | 17 | 1 | 0 | 0 | — | | 17 | 1 |
| Parma | Total | 17 | 1 | 0 | 0 | — | | 17 | 0 |
| Bursaspor | 2015–16 | 22 | 2 | 5 | 3 | — | | 27 | 5 |
| Bursaspor | 2016–17 | 30 | 6 | 5 | 1 | — | | 35 | 7 |
| Bursaspor | 2017–18 | 12 | 0 | 2 | 1 | — | | 14 | 1 |
| Bursaspor | Total | 64 | 8 | 12 | 5 | — | | 76 | 13 |
| Total | | 271 | 35 | 24 | 8 | 13 | 3 | 308 | 46 |
