= Manuel Bravo (footballer, born 1993) =

Chilean footballer

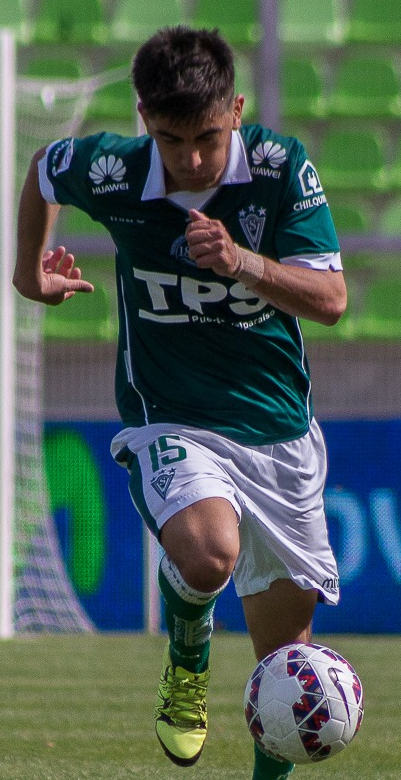

Personal information
- Full name: Johan Manuel Bravo Díaz
- Date of birth: 15 February 1993 (age 33)
- Place of birth: Molina, Maule, Chile
- Height: 1.74 m (5 ft 9 in)
- Positions: Left back; left midfielder

Youth career
- 2008–2011: Colo-Colo

Senior career*
Years	Team	Apps	(Gls)
2011–2016	Colo-Colo	13	(1)
2012–2013	Colo-Colo B	17	(1)
2013–2014	→ Barnechea (loan)	28	(1)
2014–2015	→ Unión San Felipe (loan)	31	(4)
2015–2016	→ Santiago Wanderers (loan)	10	(2)
2016–2017	O'Higgins	15	(0)
2017–2018	San Luis	18	(0)
2019	Deportes Iquique	10	(0)
2020–2021	Cobreloa	36	(1)

International career^{‡}
2012–2013	Chile U20	7	(0)
- * Club domestic league appearances and goals as of 15 June 2022 ‡ National team caps and goals as of 21 March 2012

Johan Manuel Bravo Díaz (born 15 February 1993), known as Manuel Bravo, is a Chilean footballer who last played for Primera B de Chile club Cobreloa as a left back and also as left midfielder.

== Club career ==
=== Colo-Colo ===
Bravo was born in Molina, Maule Region and joined the Colo-Colo academy at the age of fifteen, coming to the club thanks to Fernando Astengo, the coach of the club's youth ranks. When he arrived to the team, Bravo played as a striker, but after the departure of Astengo and the arrival of Luis Pérez as youth academy coach, he began to play in the left band.

In April 2011, after Roberto Cereceda's departure of the club before the Clausura Tournament left an opening in Colo-Colo's left band, because the other players in the position like Patricio Jerez and Álvaro Ormeño had not a good pace of game, even they were older. Bravo has been identified by manager Américo Gallego as a potential homegrown replacement for Cereceda, making after his competitive debut on 25 July, in a 3–0 home loss against Universidad Católica for the Copa Chile at the Estadio Monumental. During the Copa Chile, he played four of six games for the local cup, in where Bravo played of very good form despite the elimination of Colo-Colo by Primera B side Lota Schwager. On 24 August, he made his Chilean Primera División debut in a 3–1 home victory over Palestino. In that game he was used as left midfielder by his former coach in the youth ranks, Luis Pérez, after the departure of Gallego. That match he realized a good start, being replaced in the 72nd minute by Boris Rieloff. Following the appointment of Ivo Basay as coach, Bravo began to play as left back or defensive midfielder in the left band. After weeks with a good shape, on 16 October, against Católica at San Carlos, he played his worst game in the season in a 4–0 defeat, and also Bravo not made an appearance after that match.

For the season 2013/2014 he went on loan to AC Barnechea, where he played 28 games (27 as first team player, being replaced only in 3 matches and scoring 1 goal) and achieved an excellent season with his team, winning the promotion to the Premier Division for first time in the history of this small club.

In season 2014/2015 he spent a year on loan in Unión San Felipe. He played 35 games (34 as first team player, being replaced only 3 times and scoring 4 goals). This time he and his team weren't able to achieve the promotion.

His good performances in the last two years caught the attention of Premier Division team Santiago Wanderers. He went on loan again from Colo Colo. He was signed up for the local competition and Copa Sudamericana. He played 10 games and scored 2 goals in the team that ended as runner up of the 2015/2016 Ending Tournament.
