= Bryan Rabello =

Chilean footballer (born 1994)

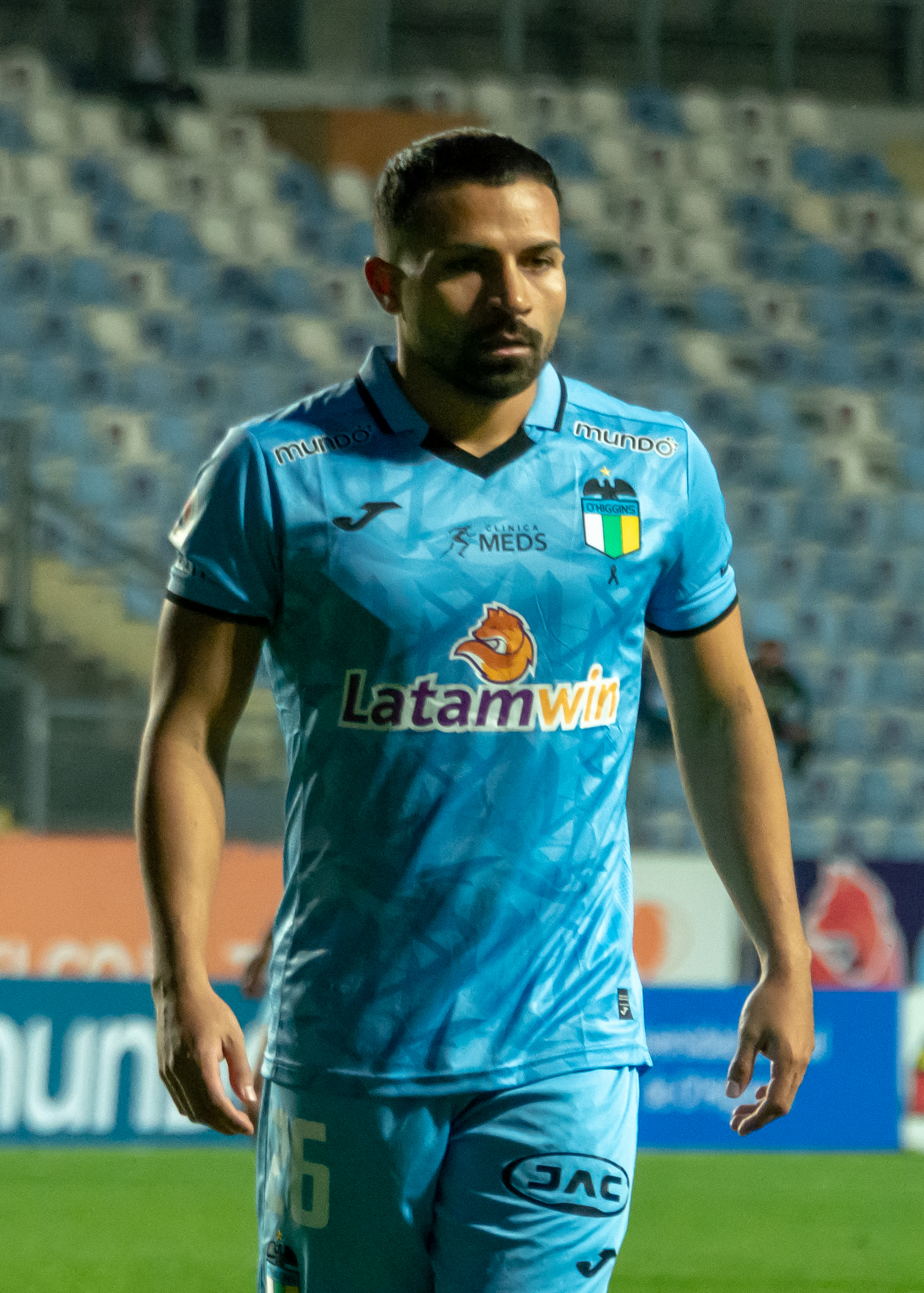
- Rabello with O'Higgins in 2023.

Personal information
- Full name: Bryan Martín Rabello Mella
- Date of birth: 16 May 1994 (age 32)
- Place of birth: Rancagua, Chile
- Height: 1.67 m (5 ft 6 in)
- Position: Attacking midfielder

Team information
- Current team: O'Higgins
- Number: 26

Youth career
- 2006–2009: Colo-Colo

Senior career*
Years	Team	Apps	(Gls)
2009–2012	Colo-Colo	20	(2)
2012	Colo-Colo B	3	(0)
2012–2013	Sevilla B	27	(2)
2012–2015	Sevilla	9	(0)
2014	→ Deportivo La Coruña (loan)	19	(0)
2014	→ Luzern (loan)	9	(0)
2015	→ Leganés (loan)	14	(0)
2015–2017	Santos Laguna	47	(5)
2017	→ UNAM (loan)	31	(2)
2018–2019	Lobos BUAP	33	(2)
2019–2020	Universidad de Concepción	6	(3)
2020–2021	Atromitos	28	(1)
2021–2022	Unión Española	29	(2)
2023	Grêmio Novorizontino	0	(0)
2023–	O'Higgins	70	(15)

International career^{‡}
2010–2011	Chile U17	9	(0)
2013	Chile U20	12	(1)
2012–2016	Chile	5	(0)
- * Club domestic league appearances and goals as of 19 July 2023 ‡ National team caps and goals as of 4 April 2012

Bryan Martín Rabello Mella (born 16 May 1994) is a Chilean professional footballer who plays for Chilean Primera División side O'Higgins as an attacking midfielder.

== Club career ==
=== Colo-Colo ===
Rabello made his competitive first team debut for Colo-Colo against Lota Schwager on 7 October 2009, aged 15, as a 36th-minute substitute for Charles Aránguiz in a Copa Chile 1–0 away victory. In the next season, Rabello made his home debut in a Copa Chile game. Within the same season, he played again as a substitute in a 4–2 victory against Curicó Unido. On 22 August 2010, the coach of the club Diego Cagna announced that Rabello would make his first start in a league game against Unión Española. His Copa Sudamericana debut came on 25 August against Universitario de Sucre as a substitute in a 3–1 home victory at Estadio Monumental.

Because of the injury of the Colombian playmaker Macnelly Torres, Diego Cagna opted to start Rabello during the club's last games. His impressive performances made many clubs of Europe interested in him. On 5 December 2010, in the last game of the 2010 Chilean Primera División, Rabello scored his first goal for the Cacique in the 50th minute in a 4–2 home victory.

=== Sevilla ===
Rabello signed a contract with Sevilla in Spain confirmed by Míchel González, where he began playing on the reserve team, Sevilla Atlético. He scored in his first-team debut in a pre-season match against UD Roteña. Rabello made his official debut with the first-team on 3 December 2012 against Real Valladolid in La Liga as a first-half substitute, replacing Cicinho in the 27th minute.

=== Loans & Mexico ===
In the next two seasons, he was played in Deportivo La Coruña, Luzern, Leganés on loan from Sevilla, and in 2015 signed a year contract with Mexican Liga MX club Santos Laguna. He played in Mexico with UNAM and BUAP until the summer of 2019. In the summer of 2019, he signed a year contract with Chilean Primera División club C.D. Universidad de Concepción.

=== Atromitos ===
On 5 February 2020, he signed a contract until the summer of 2021 with Greek Super League 1 club Atromitos for an undisclosed fee.

=== Grêmio Novorizontino ===
In March 2023, Rabello joined Grêmio Novorizontino in the Brazilian Série B.

=== O'Higgins ===
In the second half 2023, he returned to Chile and signed with O'Higgins.

== International career ==
Rabello has been capped at under-17, under-20 and senior levels for Chile. He participated with the under-17 squad in the 2010 South American Games and a tournament organized by Universidad Católica, in 2011. With the under-20 squad, he played an instrumental part in the 2013 South American U-20 Championship, playing eight matches and scoring a goal from a free kick against Peru, in a 1–1 draw, being the goal which decided Chile's qualification to the 2013 FIFA U-20 World Cup.

Rabello has played two matches for the senior squad both in friendlies. His debut came as a substitute in a friendly against Peru on 21 April 2012. His second match came after his performances in the 2013 South American U-20 Championship, starting the friendly against Egypt on 8 February 2013, being substituted at half-time.

== Career statistics ==
=== Club ===
As of 9 February 2020

Club	Season	League		Cup		Continental		Total	
Club	Season	Apps	Goals	Apps	Goals	Apps	Goals	Apps	Goals
Colo-Colo	2009	0	0	1	0	–	–	1	0
Colo-Colo	2010	6	1	1	0	1	0	8	1
Colo-Colo	2011	6	0	2	0	0	0	8	0
Colo-Colo	2012	8	1	–	–	–	–	8	1
Colo-Colo	Total	20	2	4	0	1	0	25	2
Colo-Colo B	2012	3	0	–	–	–	–	3	0
Colo-Colo B	Total	3	0	–	–	–	–	3	0
Sevilla B	2012–13	27	2	-	-	–	–	27	2
Sevilla B	Total	27	2	-	-	–	–	27	2
Sevilla	2012–13	3	0	0	0	0	0	3	0
Sevilla	2013–14	6	0	1	0	8	1	15	1
Sevilla	Total	9	0	1	0	8	1	18	1
Deportivo La Coruña	2013–14	19	0	0	0	-	-	19	0
Deportivo La Coruña	Total	19	0	0	0	-	-	19	0
FC Luzern	2014–15	9	0	1	0	-	-	10	0
FC Luzern	Total	9	0	1	0	-	-	10	0
Leganés	2014–15	14	0	0	0	-	-	14	0
Leganés	Total	14	0	0	0	-	-	14	0
Santos Laguna	2015–16	33	5	0	0	6	1	39	6
Santos Laguna	2016–17	14	0	3	0	-	-	17	0
Santos Laguna	2017–18	0	0	2	0	-	-	2	0
Santos Laguna	Total	47	5	5	0	6	1	58	6
Pumas UNAM	2016–17	17	2	0	0	2	0	19	2
Pumas UNAM	2017–18	14	0	3	0	-	-	17	0
Pumas UNAM	Total	31	2	3	0	2	0	36	2
Lobos BUAP	2018–19	33	2	1	0	-	-	34	2
Lobos BUAP	Total	33	2	1	0	-	-	34	2
C.D. Universidad de Concepción	2019	6	3	0	0	-	-	6	3
C.D. Universidad de Concepción	Total	6	3	0	0	-	-	6	3
Atromitos	2019–20	1	0	1	0	-	-	2	0
Atromitos	Total	1	0	1	0	-	-	2	0
Career total		219	16	12	0	17	2	248	18

== Honours ==
=== Club ===
Colo-Colo

- Campeonato Nacional: 2009 Clausura

Sevilla

- UEFA Europa League: 2014

Santos Laguna

- Liga MX: Clausura 2018
- Campeón de Campeones: 2015
