= Manuel Bravo =

Manuel Bravo may refer to:

- Manuel Bravo (footballer, 1897–1974), Chilean football forward
- Manuel Bravo (footballer, born 1993), Chilean football left-back
- Manuel Álvarez Bravo, Mexican photographer

== See also ==
- Manuela Bravo (born 1957), Portuguese singer
