= Roberto Gutiérrez =

Chilean footballer (born 1983)

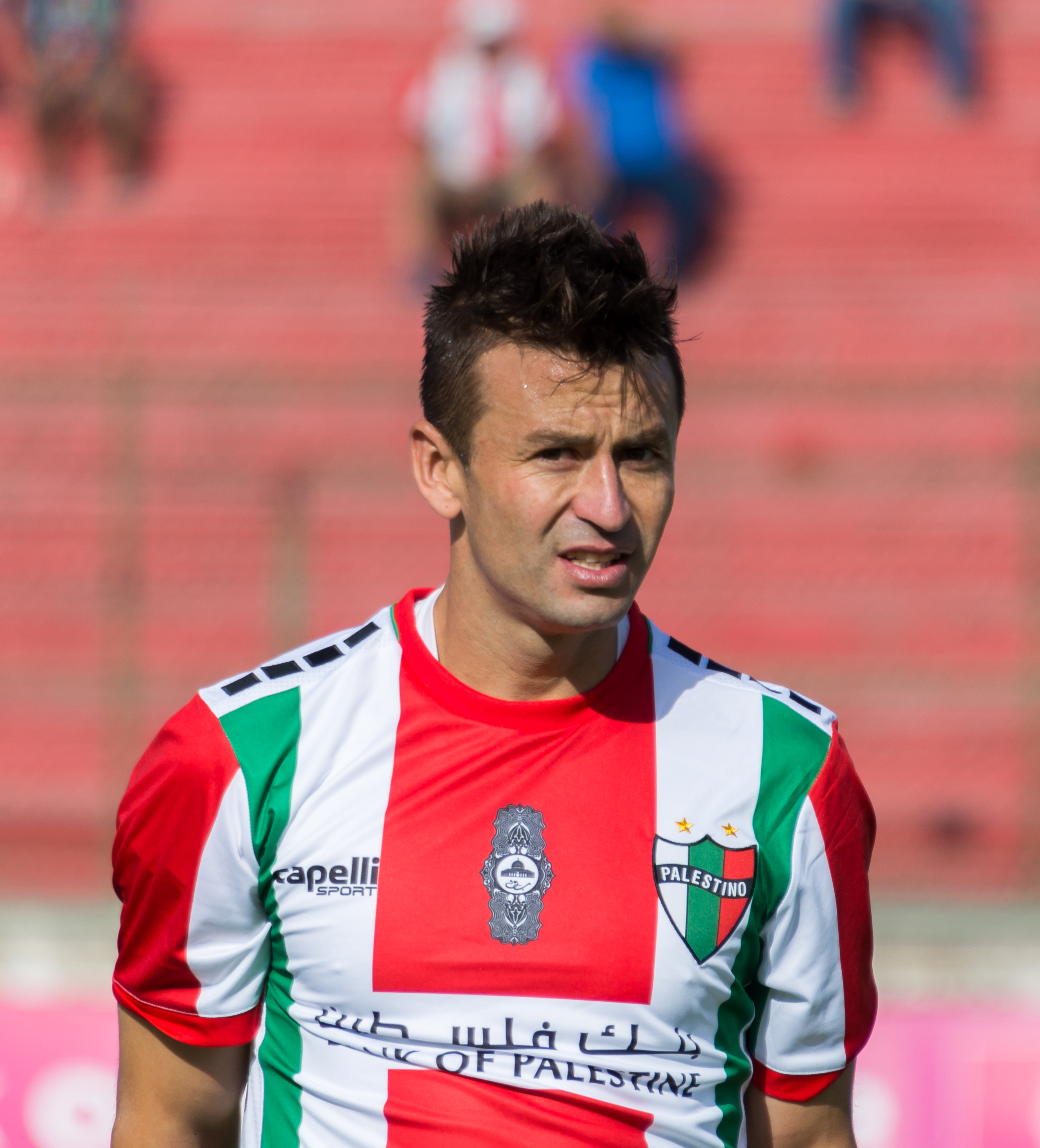
- Gutiérrez with Palestino in 2019

Personal information
- Full name: Roberto Carlos Gutiérrez Gamboa
- Date of birth: 18 April 1983 (age 43)
- Place of birth: Curacaví, Chile
- Height: 1.78 m (5 ft 10 in)
- Position: Striker

Youth career
- 1995–2003: Universidad Católica

Senior career*
Years	Team	Apps	(Gls)
2003–2008	Universidad Católica	40	(15)
2005	→ Deportes Melipilla (loan)	6	(1)
2005–2006	→ Cruz Azul Jasso (loan)	24	(2)
2008–2010	Tecos	14	(1)
2009	→ Everton (loan)	19	(3)
2009	→ Universidad Católica (loan)	15	(10)
2010–2011	Universidad Católica	33	(19)
2011–2013	Colo-Colo	36	(6)
2012–2013	Colo-Colo B	2	(1)
2013–2014	Palestino	21	(13)
2014	Atlante	11	(4)
2014	Santiago Wanderers	17	(13)
2015–2017	Universidad Católica	39	(16)
2017–2019	Palestino	51	(26)
2020	O'Higgins	21	(6)
2021	Ñublense	21	(3)
2022	Cobreloa	23	(3)
2023	Deportes Recoleta	6	(1)
Total		399	(143)

International career
2007–2015	Chile	10	(3)
- * Club domestic league appearances and goals

Roberto Carlos Gutiérrez Gamboa (born 18 April 1983) is a Chilean former footballer who played as a striker. He played in his country and Mexico.

Gutiérrez made his senior team debut in 2007 and has made 10 appearances, scoring 3 goals.

== Club career ==
Born in Curacaví, a town close to the capital Santiago, Gutiérrez joined Universidad Católica youth set-up aged 12 for be promoted to the first-adult team eight years later by the coach Óscar Meneses in 2003.

In 2005, he was loaned to Deportes Melipilla. In July 2006, Gutiérrez was loaned to the Mexican side Cruz Azul, finally playing with the team affiliation of Oaxaca. He returned to Las Condes' side for play the 2006 Torneo de Clausura, making his re-debut for the club against O'Higgins in a 1–0 away loss.

Gutiérrez made his 2007 Torneo de Apertura debut in a 1–0 home win over Santiago Wanderers, playing the full 90 minutes, and scored his first goal of the season against Lota Schwager on 18 February. With the pass of time, he broke into the first team and was an undisputed starter in the squad of the Peruvian coach José del Solar. On 16 June 2007, he suffered a serious cruciate ligament injury for second time in his career, in the 2–0 victory over Coquimbo Unido for the Apertura's last game, although after a scan it was revealed to be not as bad as first thought, with Católica optimistic that he would return before the early of the next season.

In January 2008, fully recovered of his injury, Gutiérrez signed a four-year contract with the Mexican side UAG Tecos, but he was loaned six months to the pre-cordilleran side for play the Copa Libertadores, remaining of this form in Católica. He returned to play in an 8–2 home win to Santiago Morning for the Torneo de Apertura first week, scoring the last goal in the 87th minute of game. Gutiérrez made his Libertadores debut in the 1–0 win over the Peruvian club Universidad San Martín de Porres, and scored his first goal for this contest in the next game in a 2–1 defeat against River Plate, putting the equalizer goal in the 47th minute. During the season, he appeared in 16 games, scoring in six opportunities.

After his participation in those tournaments with Católica, Gutiérrez joined the club in June 2008. He made his league debut in a 2–0 defeat against the Mexican last champion Santos Laguna, as a 77th-minute substitution. Gutiérrez only made 3 appearances for Tecos in the Torneo de Apertura.

In January 2009, it was revealed that Gutiérrez was loaned to Everton on a six-months deal for newly play the Copa Libertadores. His move to this team was on order from the coach Nelson Acosta. He made his season debut in a 1–0 defeat against Unión Española. The birdie scored the first Libertadores goal of the Acosta era in the 1–0 home win to the Venezolan club Caracas, defining after a great pass of his teammate Ezequiel Miralles.

In July of that year, he returned to Universidad Catolica, scoring 14 goals in 13 matches.

Signed by Colo-Colo for the "Clausura", he scored twice against Santiago Wanderers on 7 July 2011. After two years in the club, Colo Colo entered into one of its worst crises, and on 27 June 2013, he rescinded his contract with the team.

After leaving Cobreloa in the Primera B de Chile at the end of the 2022 season, he signed with Deportes Recoleta in the same division in July 2023.

His last club was Deportes Recoleta in 2023.

== International career ==
=== International goals ===
Scores and results list Chile's goal tally first.

No	Date	Venue	Opponent	Score	Result	Competition
1.	9 May 2007	Estadio Rubén Marcos Peralta, Osorno, Chile	Cuba	1–0	3–0	Friendly
2.	16 May 2007	Estadio Municipal Germán Becker, Temuco, Chile	Cuba	1–0	2–0	Friendly
3.	29 January 2015	Estadio El Teniente, Rancagua, Chile	United States	1–1	3–2	Friendly

== Personal life ==
Gutiérrez is nicknamed Pájaro (Bird).

In 2024, Gutiérrez started a football academy in his hometown, Curacaví.

== Post-retirement ==
In August 2025, Gutiérrez joined the Chile national team for the Influencers World Cup Johor 2025 in Malaysia, alongside Jaime Valdés and Mark González.

== Career statistics ==
As of match played on 17 February 2018

Appearances and goals by club, season and competition
Club	Season	League			Cup		Other		Total	
Club	Season	Division	Apps	Goals	Apps	Goals	Apps	Goals	Apps	Goals
Tecos	2008	Primera División de México	3	0	0	0	0	0	3	0
Tecos	2009–10	Primera División de México	11	1	0	0	4 (Note: Three appearances in InterLiga, One appearance in Copa Libertadores)	0	15	1
Tecos	Total		14	1	0	0	4	0	18	1
Everton (loan)	2009	Primera División of Chile	19	3	0	0	6 (Note: Appearances in Copa Libertadores)	3	25	6
Everton (loan)	Total		19	3	0	0	6	3	25	6
Universidad Católica (loan)	2009	Primera División of Chile	15	10	0	0	0	0	15	10
Universidad Católica (loan)	2010	Primera División of Chile	17	14	1	0	0	0	18	14
Universidad Católica (loan)	2011	Primera División of Chile	16	5	0	0	7	1	23	6
Universidad Católica (loan)	Total		48	29	1	0	7	1	56	30
Colo-Colo	2011	Primera División of Chile	16	5	5	2	0	0	21	7
Colo-Colo	2012	Primera División of Chile	19	1	5	2	0	0	24	3
Colo-Colo	2013	Primera División of Chile	7	0	0	0	0	0	7	0
Colo-Colo	Total		42	6	10	4	0	0	52	10
Colo-Colo B	2012	Segunda División de Chile	1	0	—				1	0
Colo-Colo B	2013	Segunda División de Chile	1	1	—				1	1
Colo-Colo B	Total		2	1	0	0	0	0	2	1
Palestino	2013–14	Primera División of Chile	21	13	3	3	0	0	24	16
Palestino	Total		21	13	3	3	0	0	24	16
Atlante	2013–14	Liga MX	11	4	0	0	0	0	11	4
Atlante	Total		11	4	0	0	0	0	11	4
Santiago Wanderers	2014–15	Primera División of Chile	17	13	2	1	0	0	19	14
Santiago Wanderers	Total		17	13	2	1	0	0	19	4
Universidad Católica	2014–15	Primera División of Chile	17	6	0	0	0	0	17	6
Universidad Católica	2015–16	Primera División of Chile	12	6	4	1	2 (Note: Appearances in Copa Sudamericana)	1	18	8
Universidad Católica	2016–17	Primera División of Chile	10	4	2	0	5	0	17	4
Universidad Católica	Total		39	16	6	1	7	1	52	18
Palestino	2017	Chilean Primera División	15	8	3	2	2	0	20	10
Palestino	2018	Chilean Primera División	24	8	5	1	0	0	3	3
Palestino	Total		39	16	8	3	2	0	23	13
Career totals			241	88	30	12	26	5	297	105

== Honours ==
Universidad Católica

- Primera División (3): 2010, 2016–C, 2016–A
- Supercopa de Chile (1): 2016

Palestino

- Copa Chile (1): 2018
