= Alejandro Figueroa =

Alejandro Figueroa may refer to:

- Alejandro Figueroa (footballer, born 1980), Chilean footballer
- Alejandro Figueroa (footballer, born 1978), Colombian footballer
