= 2010 Primera Division of Chile =

Campeonato Nacional Petrobras
- Season: 2010
- Champions: Universidad Católica (10th title)
- Relegated: Everton; San Luis
- 2011 Copa Libertadores: Universidad Católica; Colo-Colo; Unión Española
- 2010 Copa Sudamericana: Colo-Colo; Universidad de Chile
- Matches played: 306
- Goals scored: 901 (2.94 per match)
- Top goalscorer: Milovan Mirosevic (19 goals)
- Biggest home win: Colo-Colo 6–1 La Serena (March 19)
- Biggest away win: Ñublense 1–5 Audax Italiano (August 1)
- Highest scoring: Audax Italiano 5–6 Ñublense (January 25)
- Highest attendance: 40,149 Colo-Colo 3–2 Universidad Católica (17 October)
- Total attendance: 1,548,515
- Average attendance: 4,963

The 2010 Primera División del Fútbol Profesional Chileno season (known as the 2010 Campeonato Nacional Petrobras for sponsorship reasons) was the 79th season of top-flight football in Chile. Originally comprising two tournaments, the 2010 season was the first single-stage season since 2001. This was due to the devastating 8.8 magnitude earthquake on February 27, 2010. Universidad Católica won their tenth title.

== Format changes ==
Due to Chile's qualification to the 2010 FIFA World Cup, the format for the season had seen a minor modification in the Apertura, which would not have the playoff stage. The Clausura remained unchanged. In the wake of the 8.8 magnitude earthquake that struck the country on February 27, the format was further changed to a double round-robin format by the ANFP, because many teams could not fulfill their Apertura fixtures in time as a result of the earthquake damage. After the Round 1 (the first 17 dates), the team with the most points qualified to the 2010 Copa Sudamericana and the 2011 Copa Libertadores. The next best-placed team played a playoff against Municipal Iquique for the last berth in the 2010 Copa Sudamericana. The season champion (the team with the most points after all 34 dates) also earned a berth to the 2011 Copa Libertadores. The Chile 3 berth for that competition have gone to the winner of a Liguilla of the 2nd, 3rd, 4th, and 5th best-placed teams at the end of the season.

== Teams ==
Locations of the 2010 Primera División teams

Team	City	Stadium	Manager
Audax Italiano	Santiago	Municipal de La Florida	Omar Labruna
Cobreloa	Calama	Municipal de Calama	Mario Soto
Cobresal	El Salvador	El Cobre	Luis Musrri
Colo-Colo	Santiago	Monumental David Arellano	Diego Cagna
Everton	Viña del Mar	Sausalito	Diego Osella
Huachipato	Talcahuano	CAP	Arturo Salah
Deportes La Serena	La Serena	La Portada	Víctor Hugo Castañeda
Ñublense	Chillán	Municipal Nelson Oyarzún Arenas	Luis Marcoleta
O'Higgins	Rancagua	El Teniente	Marco Antonio Figueroa
Palestino	Santiago	Municipal de La Cisterna	Gustavo Benítez
San Luis	Quillota	Municipal Lucio Fariña Fernández	Cristian Ochoa
Santiago Morning	Santiago	Municipal de La Pintana	Fernando Díaz Seguel
Santiago Wanderers	Valparaíso	Regional Chiledeportes	Jorge Garcés
Unión Española	Santiago	Santa Laura	José Luis Sierra
Unión San Felipe	San Felipe	Municipal de San Felipe	Ivo Basay
Universidad Católica	Santiago	San Carlos de Apoquindo	Juan Antonio Pizzi
Universidad de Chile	Santiago	Nacional	Gerardo Pelusso
Universidad de Concepción	Concepción	Municipal de Concepción	Yuri Fernandez

== Standings ==
Pos	Team	Pld	W	D	L	GF	GA	GD	Pts	Qualification or relegation
1	Universidad Católica	34	23	5	6	77	39	+38	74	2011 Copa Libertadores Second Stage
2	Colo-Colo	34	22	5	7	67	34	+33	71	2011 Copa Libertadores Second Stage (Note: Colo-Colo qualified as the best team after Round 1.)
3	Audax Italiano	34	20	5	9	75	58	+17	65	Pre-Copa Libertadores Liguilla
4	Universidad de Chile	34	20	4	10	75	48	+27	64	Pre-Copa Libertadores Liguilla
5	Unión Española	34	14	10	10	58	50	+8	52	Pre-Copa Libertadores Liguilla
6	Huachipato	34	12	12	10	44	40	+4	48	Pre-Copa Libertadores Liguilla
7	Santiago Wanderers	34	12	9	13	48	52	−4	45	
8	Deportes La Serena	34	13	6	15	45	59	−14	45	
9	Unión San Felipe	34	12	7	15	38	47	−9	43	
10	Cobresal	34	12	6	16	47	52	−5	42	
11	Palestino	34	11	9	14	35	41	−6	42	
12	O'Higgins	34	10	11	13	46	44	+2	41	
13	Ñublense	34	9	13	12	54	66	−12	40	
14	Cobreloa	34	10	9	15	45	47	−2	39	
15	Universidad de Concepción	34	9	11	14	39	50	−11	38	Relegation/Promotion Playoffs
16	Santiago Morning	34	9	9	16	34	45	−11	36	Relegation/Promotion Playoffs
17	Everton	34	8	10	16	38	58	−20	34	Relegated to the Primera División B
18	San Luis	34	5	9	20	36	71	−35	24	Relegated to the Primera División B

Rules for classification: 1st points; 2nd wins; 3rd goal difference; 4th goals scored; 5th away goals; 6th red cards received; 7th yellow cards received; 8th draw

== Results ==
Home \ Away	AUD	CLA	CSL	COL	SER	EVE	HUA	ÑUB	O'HI	PAL	SLU	SAM	SAW	UES	USF	UCA	UCH	UCO
Audax Italiano		3–1	4–2	2–3	2–1	2–0	1–1	5–6	2–1	1–3	2–2	1–0	0–4	5–2	1–0	1–3	1–2	4–1
Cobreloa	1–1		2–1	2–1	4–0	4–0	1–1	3–2	1–1	0–0	5–0	2–1	2–1	3–1	0–0	2–3	0–2	1–1
Cobresal	2–1	0–1		2–5	0–2	1–2	2–1	0–0	1–2	2–1	4–2	3–0	1–0	1–0	0–0	3–1	1–2	3–1
Colo-Colo	1–3	3–1	1–0		6–1	2–0	0–0	2–2	2–0	3–0	3–1	0–1	3–0	1–0	5–2	3–2	1–0	4–2
D. La Serena	1–3	1–0	3–0	1–2		2–1	0–3	1–0	4–2	0–0	1–3	2–0	4–0	3–1	3–1	1–1	2–4	0–0
Everton	1–2	2–1	2–2	0–2	3–3		0–1	2–3	1–0	1–1	1–1	1–1	0–2	0–1	3–0	1–1	2–1	1–1
Huachipato	1–2	2–0	4–3	1–2	0–0	1–1		1–1	2–1	0–0	2–1	1–0	3–2	1–2	1–1	1–3	1–2	3–0
Ñublense	1–5	1–1	3–1	0–0	3–1	0–2	1–1		0–3	1–0	4–0	1–1	2–2	1–1	2–0	1–4	0–2	2–2
O'Higgins	5–1	2–2	0–1	2–1	4–0	0–0	0–0	2–2		4–1	0–0	1–0	2–2	0–0	1–2	1–0	3–3	1–2
Palestino	2–5	1–0	1–0	1–2	3–0	2–2	2–1	2–0	1–0		3–2	2–1	0–1	0–0	1–0	0–1	0–1	1–1
San Luis	1–2	2–1	1–1	0–2	0–1	0–2	1–4	3–3	1–2	0–0		2–2	3–4	3–1	0–1	1–1	0–3	1–0
S. Morning	0–1	0–0	1–1	0–2	2–3	3–0	0–3	4–1	2–1	2–1	2–0		2–1	1–1	1–0	0–2	1–2	2–0
S. Wanderers	1–0	2–1	0–4	0–1	5–0	2–0	0–0	2–2	1–1	2–0	0–2	1–1		1–1	2–1	2–4	3–3	1–0
U. Española	2–2	3–1	2–0	1–0	1–1	3–2	5–0	1–3	1–1	3–2	2–1	2–2	3–0		1–2	2–1	2–1	3–0
U. San Felipe	1–2	1–0	1–0	3–2	1–0	1–3	1–1	3–1	2–0	1–1	3–0	1–0	1–1	2–4		1–3	1–2	0–0
Univ. Católica	2–3	2–1	0–2	0–0	2–1	5–0	2–0	4–2	4–1	2–1	4–1	4–0	3–1	2–0	2–1		4–2	1–0
Univ. de Chile	2–2	3–1	5–1	2–2	1–2	5–1	3–0	1–2	0–1	1–2	4–0	2–1	1–0	4–3	4–2	1–2		4–2
U. de Concepción	1–3	3–0	1–1	2–0	1–0	2–1	0–2	4–1	2–1	1–0	1–1	0–0	1–2	3–3	0–1	2–2	2–0	

Legend: Blue = home team win; Yellow = draw; Red = away team win.

=== Relegation/promotion playoffs ===
Teams			Scores		Tie-breakers	
Team #1	Points	Team #2	1st leg	2nd leg	GD	Pen.
Santiago Morning	3:3	Antofagasta	1–2	3–1 (aet)	+1:–1	—
Universidad de Concepción	6:0	Curicó Unido	2–0	3–2	—	—

== Internationals qualification ==
=== Round 1 standings ===
The team that occupies first-place after the first 17 matches of the season automatically qualified for the group stage of the 2011 Copa Libertadores and the 2010 Copa Sudamericana. The second-placed team advanced to a playoff and face-off the 2009 Copa Chile runner-up Municipal Iquique for a spot in the 2010 Copa Sudamericana.

Pos	Team	Pld	W	D	L	GF	GA	GD	Pts	Qualification
1	Colo-Colo	17	12	2	3	38	15	+23	38	2011 Copa Libertadores Second Stage & 2010 Copa Sudamericana First Stage
2	Universidad de Chile	17	11	3	3	45	24	+21	36	Copa Sudamericana Playoff
3	Universidad Católica	17	10	4	3	31	18	+13	34	
4	O'Higgins	17	7	5	5	25	17	+8	26	
5	Unión Española	17	6	7	4	24	22	+2	25	
6	Unión San Felipe	17	7	4	6	22	22	0	25	2010 Copa Sudamericana Second Stage (Note: Unión San Felipe qualified to the 2010 Copa Sudamericana as the 2009 Copa Chile champion.)
7	Cobresal	17	7	3	7	27	29	−2	24	
8	Audax Italiano	17	7	3	7	33	38	−5	24	
9	Huachipato	17	6	5	6	20	21	−1	23	

=== Pre-Copa Sudamericana Playoff ===
Universidad de Chile, The second best-placed team after Round 1, will play a two-legged tie against Municipal Iquique, the 2009 Copa Chile runner-up, for the Chile 3 berth in the 2010 Copa Sudamericana.

Pos	Team	Pld	W	D	L	GF	GA	GD	Pts	Qualification
1	Universidad de Chile	2	2	0	0	6	1	+5	6	2010 Copa Sudamericana First Stage
2	Municipal Iquique	2	0	0	2	1	6	−5	0	

Rules for classification: 1st points; 2nd goal difference; 3rd away goals; 4th extra-time; 5th penalty shoot-out.

August 12, 2010	Municipal Iquique	0–2	Universidad de Chile	Estadio Tierra de Campeones, Iquique
22:20 UTC-4		Report	G. Vargas 7'; A. Rojas 81'	Attendance: 5,935; Referee: Julio Bascuñán

August 18, 2010	Universidad de Chile	4–1	Municipal Iquique	Estadio Francisco Sánchez Rumoroso, Coquimbo
22:20 UTC-4	Puch 24'; Rodríguez 70', 84'; G. Vargas 73' (pen.)	Report	Contreras 44'	Attendance: 2,500; Referee: Claudio Puga

=== Pre-Copa Libertadores Liguilla ===
Universidad de Chile, Audax Italiano, Unión Española and Huachipato qualified for the Copa Libertadores Liguilla. The winner of the Liguilla will qualify to the 2011 Copa Libertadores as Chile 3.

The format for the Liguilla was a single elimination tournament, with two legs in each round. The team that finished 2nd in the final league standings played the team that finished 5th, and the team that finished 3rd played the team that finished 4th. The team that finished higher in the standings played the second leg at home. Ties were settled by points (3 for a win, 1 for a draw, 0 for a loss). If there was a tie in point at the end of regulation of the second leg, the team with the best goal difference advances/wins. If a tie remains, the away goals rule is applied, followed by two 15-minute extra-time, and a penalty shootout if necessary.

==== First round ====
===== Tie 1 =====
Pos	Team	Pld	W	D	L	GF	GA	GD	Pts	Qualification
1	Audax Italiano	2	1	0	1	3	2	+1	3	Finals
2	Huachipato	2	1	0	1	2	3	−1	3	

Rules for classification: 1st points; 2nd goal difference; 3rd away goals; 4th extra-time; 5th penalty shoot-out.

December 8, 2010	Huachipato	2–1	Audax Italiano	Estadio CAP, Talcahuano
20:00	Zelaye 34'; Rebolledo 78'	Report	Zalazar 1'	Attendance: 6,039; Referee: Claudio Puga

December 12, 2010	Audax Italiano	2–0	Huachipato	Estadio Municipal de La Florida, Santiago
19:30	Medel 2'; Rieloff 49'	Report		Attendance: 7,145; Referee: Pablo Pozo

===== Tie 2 =====
Pos	Team	Pld	W	D	L	GF	GA	GD	Pts	Qualification
1	Unión Española	2	1	1	0	4	1	+3	4	Finals
2	Universidad de Chile	2	0	1	1	1	4	−3	1	

Rules for classification: 1st points; 2nd goal difference; 3rd away goals; 4th extra-time; 5th penalty shoot-out.

December 9, 2010	Unión Española	0–0	Universidad de Chile	Estadio Santa Laura, Santiago
19:30		Report		Attendance: 5,652; Referee: Eduardo Gamboa

December 12, 2010	Universidad de Chile	1–4	Unión Española	Estadio Nacional, Santiago
17:00	Gallegos 77'	Report	Monje 3'; Canales 5', 65', 87'	Attendance: 9,260; Referee: Enrique Osses

==== Finals ====
Pos	Team	Pld	W	D	L	GF	GA	GD	Pts	Qualification
1	Unión Española	2	1	1	0	3	2	+1	4	2011 Copa Libertadores First Stage
2	Audax Italiano	2	0	1	1	2	3	−1	1	

Rules for classification: 1st points; 2nd goal difference; 3rd away goals; 4th extra-time; 5th penalty shoot-out.

December 15, 2010	Unión Española	2–1	Audax Italiano	Estadio Santa Laura, Santiago
20:00	Leal 17'; Canales 90' (pen.)	Report	Pinto 73'	Attendance: 5,523; Referee: Jorge Osorio

December 19, 2010	Audax Italiano	1–1	Unión Española	Estadio Municipal de La Florida, Santiago
19:00	Campos 30'	Report	Canales 43'	Attendance: 11,953; Referee: Pablo Pozo

== Top goalscorers ==
Pos	Player	Player nationality	Club	Goals
1	Milovan Mirosevic	Chilean	Universidad Católica	19
2	Mauro Olivi	Argentine	Audax Italiano	18
3	Carlos Muñoz	Chilean	Santiago Wanderers	17
4	Juan Manuel Olivera	Uruguayan	Universidad de Chile	16
4	Diego Rivarola	Argentine	Universidad de Chile	16
6	Roberto Gutiérrez	Chilean	Universidad Católica	14
6	Ezequiel Miralles	Argentine	Colo-Colo	14
6	Gabriel Rodríguez	Argentine	Ñublense	14
