= Cristian Magaña =

Chilean footballer (born 1991)

Personal information
- Full name: Cristian Javier Magaña Leyton
- Date of birth: 26 March 1991 (age 35)
- Place of birth: Pichidegua, Chile
- Height: 1.78 m (5 ft 10 in)
- Position: Centre-back

Team information
- Current team: Santiago Morning
- Number: 17

Youth career
- 2006–2009: Colo-Colo

Senior career*
Years	Team	Apps	(Gls)
2010–2014	Colo-Colo	5	(0)
2010	→ Unión San Felipe (loan)	12	(0)
2012	→ Everton (loan)	16	(2)
2012	Colo-Colo B	12	(1)
2013–2014	→ Universidad de Concepción (loan)	5	(0)
2015–2017	Deportes Puerto Montt	59	(1)
2018	Deportes Copiapó	21	(0)
2019–2021	Deportes Melipilla	41	(0)
2021	Lautaro de Buin	18	(0)
2022–2025	Deportes Melipilla	84	(0)
2026–	Santiago Morning	0	(0)

International career
2011	Chile U20	8	(0)
- * Club domestic league appearances and goals as of 25 January 2026

Cristian Javier Magaña Leyton (born 26 March 1991) is a Chilean professional footballer who plays as a centre-back for Santiago Morning.

== Career ==
Magaña spent four seasons with Deportes Melipilla from 2022 to 2025. The next year, he joined Santiago Morning in the Segunda División Profesional de Chile.
