= Idalis Villanueva =

American engineering educator

Idalis Villanueva Alarcón is an American scholar of engineering education, and a professor at the University of Florida, where she chairs the Department of Engineering Education. Her publications have considered the hidden curriculum in engineering,^{[A]} applied critical pedagogy to engineering education,^{[B]} and explored the nomenclature of Latin Americans in engineering.^{[C]}

== Education and career ==
Villanueva is originally from Aguadilla, Puerto Rico, and majored in chemical engineering at the University of Puerto Rico at Mayagüez. She continued her studies in chemical and biological engineering at the University of Colorado Boulder, receiving a master's degree and completing her Ph.D. there.

After postdoctoral research at the National Institutes of Health, she became a lecturer in bioengineering at the University of Maryland, College Park. In 2013, she moved to Utah State University as an assistant professor of engineering education, and in 2020, she moved to the University of Florida as an associate professor.

== Recognition ==
Villanueva was a 2019 recipient of the Presidential Early Career Award for Scientists and Engineers. She was the 2025 recipient of the IEEE Leon K. Kirchmayer Graduate Teaching Award, given "for international leadership in diversifying graduate engineering education, mentorship, professional development, and impact spanning multiple disciplines".

== Selected publications ==
A.	Villanueva, Idalis; Gelles, Laura; Di Stefano, Marialuisa; Smith, Buffy; Tull, Renetta; Lord, Susan; Benson, Lisa; Hunt, Anne; Riley, Donna; Ryan, Gery (June 2018), "What Does Hidden Curriculum in Engineering Look Like and How Can It Be Explored?", 2018 ASEE Annual Conference & Exposition Proceedings, doi:10.18260/1-2--31234

B.	Mejia, Joel Alejandro; Revelo, Renata A.; Villanueva, Idalis; Mejia, Janice (September 2018), "Critical Theoretical Frameworks in Engineering Education: An Anti-Deficit and Liberative Approach", Education Sciences, 8 (4): 158, doi:10.3390/educsci8040158

C.	Villanueva Alarcón, Idalis; Mejia, Joel Alejandro; Mejia, Janice; Revelo, Renata (September 2022), "Latiné, Latinx, Latina, Latino, or Hispanic: Problematizing terms often used in engineering education", Journal of Engineering Education, 111 (4): 735–739, doi:10.1002/jee.20486
