= Matthías Villanueva =

Chilean footballer (born 1993)

Personal information
- Full name: Claudio Matthías Villanueva Gutiérrez
- Date of birth: 16 February 1993 (age 33)
- Place of birth: Santiago, Chile
- Height: 1.78 m (5 ft 10 in)
- Position: Attacking midfielder

Youth career
- 2005–2011: Colo-Colo

Senior career*
| Years | Team | Apps | (Gls) |
| 2011–2014 | Colo-Colo | 1 | (0) |
| 2012–2014 | Colo-Colo B | 37 | (15) |
| 2015–2016 | Deportes Linares | 13 | (3) |
| 2016 | Municipal Santiago | – | (–) |
| 2018 | Municipal Santiago | – | (–) |
| Total | | 51 | (18) |
- * Club domestic league appearances and goals

Claudio Matthías Villanueva Gutiérrez (born 16 February 1993), known as Matthías Villanueva, is a Chilean former footballer who played as an attacking midfielder.

He began his football career at Colo-Colo youth ranks during a young age, being promoted to the first adult team by the coach Américo Gallego for a 2011 Copa Chile match against Universidad Católica. Villanueva made his first Primera División appearance the same season for the Clausura Tournament in a 2–0 away defeat against O'Higgins, that occasion, with Ivo Basay as coach. The next season, Villanueva was relegated to the reserve team Colo-Colo B that play at the Segunda División Profesional.
