= Garra Blanca =

Supporters' group of Chilean football club Colo-Colo

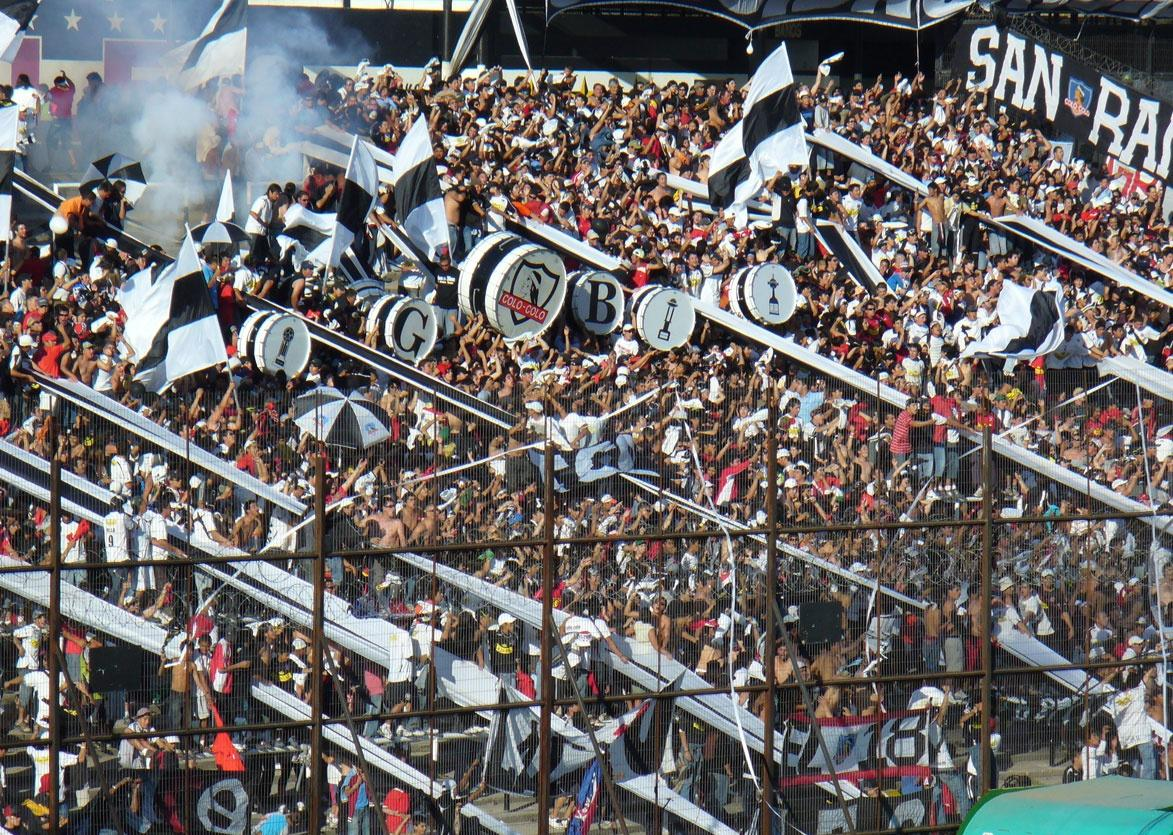
- Garra Blanca
- Established: 1986
- Type: Supporters' group Ultras group
- Team: Colo-Colo
- Location: Santiago, Chile
- Arena: Estadio Monumental David Arellano
- Colors: White, black

Garra Blanca (Spanish: White Claw) is the name of a barra brava formed by fans of the Santiago-based football club Colo-Colo in Chile. It is considered one of the three largest and most influential barras bravas in the country, alongside Universidad de Chile's Los de Abajo ("Those from Below") and Universidad Catolica's Los Cruzados ("The Crusaders").

== History ==
Garra Blanca emerged in early 1986 as part of a youth movement among Colo-Colo supporters, inspired by European football hooliganism. During the military dictatorship of Augusto Pinochet, the group attracted individuals from marginalized sectors of Chilean society seeking collective identity and expression. Over time, Garra Blanca has become associated with frequent episodes of violence, including clashes with stadium security personnel, Chilean national police, and rival barra brava groups.

Leaders of Garra Blanca are reported to maintain an unofficial relationship with Blanco y Negro S.A., the corporate entity that manages Colo-Colo. While the board of directors denies any formal alliance, it has acknowledged the group's presence for reasons related to stadium safety and coordination.
