= Gerardo Pelusso =

Uruguayan footballer and manager (born 1954)

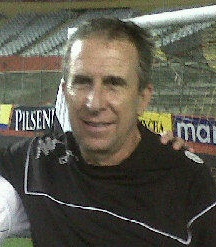
- Pelusso in 2011

Personal information
- Full name: Gerardo Cono Pelusso Boyrie
- Date of birth: 25 February 1954 (age 72)
- Place of birth: Florida, Uruguay
- Height: 1.85 m (6 ft 1 in)
- Position: Midfielder

Senior career*
Years	Team	Apps	(Gls)
1970–1971	Nacional		
1972–1973	Colón		
1975	Liverpool MVD		
1976–1977	Atlético Potosino		
1978	Deportivo Quito		
1979–1980	LDU Quito		
1981–1982	Emelec		

Managerial career
- 1984: Emelec
- 1985–1988: Florida
- 1989–1990: Florida Regional Team (UY)
- 1991: Liverpool MVD
- 1992: Quilmes Florida (UY)
- 1993–1995: Cerro
- 1996–1997: Iquique
- 1997: O'Higgins
- 1998: Everton Viña
- 1999: Frontera Rivera
- 2000: Racing Montevideo
- 2001–2002: Aucas
- 2003: Cerro
- 2004–2005: Danubio
- 2006–2007: Alianza Lima
- 2007–2009: Nacional
- 2010: Universidad de Chile
- 2011–2012: Olimpia
- 2012–2013: Paraguay
- 2014: Nacional
- 2015–2016: Santa Fe
- 2016: Al-Arabi
- 2017–2018: Deportivo Cali
- * Club domestic league appearances and goals

Gerardo Cono Pelusso Boyrie (born February 25, 1954) is a Uruguayan football manager. In 2006 season, he was chosen as the best coach in the country in all sport disciplines by the Uruguayan Olympic Committee.

== Al-Arabi ==
On 28 June 2016, Gerardo Pelusso become manager of Al-Arabi, replacing Gianfranco Zola as manager.

== Honours ==
=== Clubs ===
Honour	Club	Year
Copa Nacional de Selecciones del Interior	Florida Regional Team	1990
Liga de Florida	Florida	1992
Campeonato de Clubes del Interior	Frontera Rivera	1999
Copa Sudamericana	Santa Fe	2015

=== National teams ===
Honour	Club	Country	Year
Uruguayan First Division	Danubio	Uruguay	2004
Peruvian First Division	Alianza Lima	Peru	2006
Uruguayan First Division	Nacional	Uruguay	2008-09
Paraguayan First Division	Olimpia	Paraguay	2011
