= Álvaro Ormeño =

Chilean footballer (born 1979)

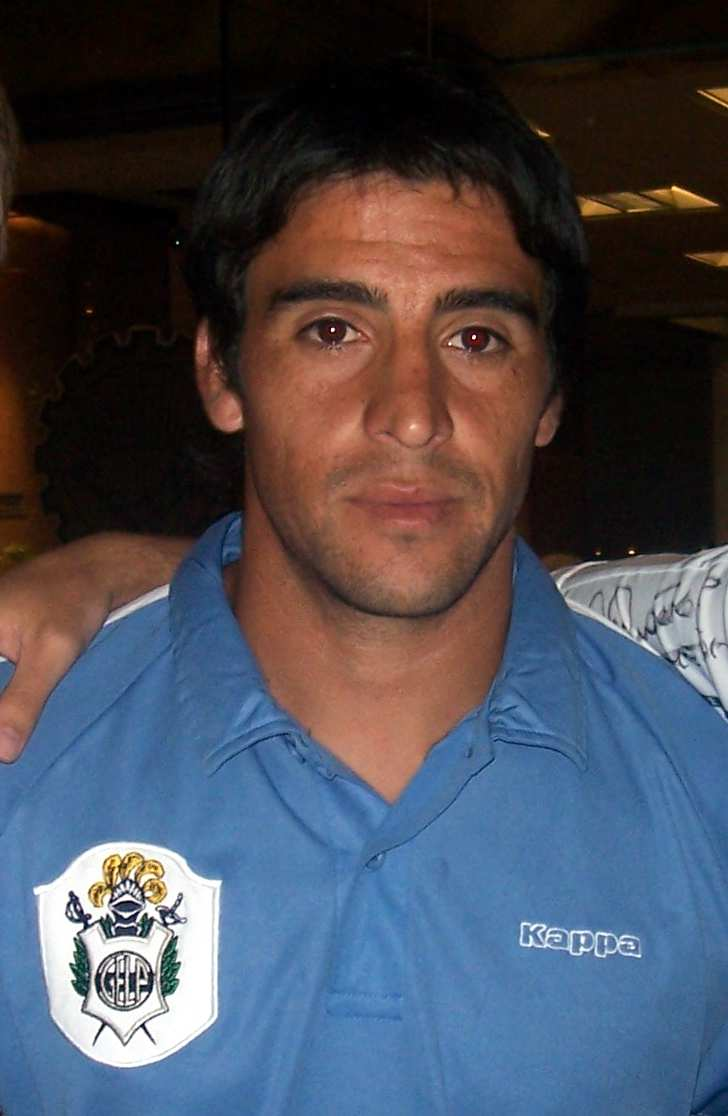
- Ormeño in January 2009

Personal information
- Full name: Álvaro Andrés Ormeño Salazar
- Date of birth: 4 April 1979 (age 47)
- Place of birth: Viña del Mar, Chile
- Height: 1.73 m (5 ft 8 in)
- Position: Right back

Youth career
- 1994–1999: Colo-Colo

Senior career*
Years	Team	Apps	(Gls)
1999	Hosanna	–	(–)
2000	Ñublense	29	(0)
2001	Deportes Ovalle	31	(2)
2002	Santiago Morning	19	(1)
2003–2005	Everton	51	(2)
2005–2006	Colo-Colo	45	(2)
2007–2010	Gimnasia LP	104	(3)
2011–2012	Colo-Colo	46	(0)
2012–2013	Deportes Iquique	20	(0)
2014–2015	Rangers	17	(1)
Total		362	(11)

International career
2007	Chile	8	(0)
- * Club domestic league appearances and goals

Álvaro Andrés Ormeño Salazar (Spanish pronunciation: [ˈalβaɾo oɾˈmeɲo]; born 4 April 1979) is a Chilean former professional footballer who operated as a right back or wing back.

== Club career ==
Ormeño began his career at Colo-Colo youth ranks aged fifteen. After failing to be promoted to first adult team, he played for Club Social y Deportivo Cristiano Hosanna in the Chilean Tercera División. Next, he joined Ñublense in the 2000–01 season and then to Deportes Ovalle. In January 2002, he signed for Primera División club Santiago Morning. Ormeño returned to Colo-Colo after his two-year spell at Everton.

== International career ==
In 2007, he made five appearances for Chile national team at both the Copa América and friendly matches.

== Personal life ==
He is the son of Raúl Ormeño, a historical player of Colo-Colo and the Chile national team, and the older brother of the also footballer Martín Ormeño.

== Honours ==
=== Club ===
Colo-Colo

- Primera División de Chile: 2006 Apertura, 2006 Clausura
- Copa Sudamericana: Runner-up 2006
