= Alejandro Figueroa (footballer, born 1980) =

Chilean footballer

Personal information
- Full name: Alejandro Andrés Figueroa Irribarra
- Date of birth: 11 May 1980 (age 46)
- Place of birth: Concepción, Chile
- Height: 1.69 m (5 ft 7 in)
- Position: Midfielder

Senior career*
Years	Team	Apps	(Gls)
2001–2003	Huachipato	12	(0)
2004	Santiago Wanderers	10	(0)
2005	Temuco	33	(1)
2006	Ñublense		
2007	Lota Schwager	29	(2)
2008–2009	Osorno	53	(1)
2010–2012	Concepción	99	(6)
2013	Unión Temuco	10	(0)
2014–2015	Lota Schwager	71	(0)
- * Club domestic league appearances and goals as of 28 July 2021

Alejandro Andrés Figueroa Irribarra (born 11 May 1980) is a Chilean retired footballer.

His last club was Lota Schwager.
