= Boris Rieloff =

Chilean footballer (born 1984)

Personal information
- Full name: Boris Alexis Rieloff Venegas
- Date of birth: 8 January 1984 (age 42)
- Place of birth: Santiago, Chile
- Height: 1.86 m (6 ft 1 in)
- Position: Right back

Youth career
- 1993–2003: Audax Italiano

Senior career*
Years	Team	Apps	(Gls)
2004–2010	Audax Italiano	245	(21)
2011	Gimnasia La Plata	10	(0)
2011–2013	Colo-Colo	20	(0)
2012	→ Deportes Iquique (loan)	36	(6)
2013	Colo-Colo B	7	(0)
2013–2014	Audax Italiano	14	(1)
2013	Audax Italiano B	2	(0)
2014–2015	Deportes Iquique	28	(1)
2015–2016	Ñublense	24	(3)
2018	Deportes Melipilla	11	(0)
Total		397	(32)

International career
2006–2007	Chile	5	(0)
- * Club domestic league appearances and goals

Boris Alexis Rieloff Venegas (born 8 January 1984) is a Chilean former professional footballer who played as a right back.

He spent much of his career at Audax Italiano, where he was promoted to the first team in 2004. He remained with the club until December 2010, when he was transferred to Club de Gimnasia y Esgrima La Plata of the Argentine Primera División. However, he had an inconsistent spell there and, after his contract was not renewed, he signed for Colo-Colo, the most successful team in his country.

Rieloff failed to establish himself as a regular at Colo-Colo, which led to loan spells in 2012 and during the 2013–14 and 2014–15 seasons at Audax, his original club, and Deportes Iquique, where he did manage to play regularly.

In 2015, his contract with Colo-Colo ended. His final clubs were Ñublense and Deportes Melipilla; he retired at the age of 33 in 2018.

== Club career ==
Rieloff began his career at Audax Italiano football academy. He arrived at Audax Italiano in 1993 when he was nine for then be promoted to the first-adult team in 2004. His good performances under the coach Raúl Toro Fuenzalida during 2006 and 2007 seasons made his services as a right back a great value.

After 2008, the decline of Audax in the national concert —in comparison with his previous campaigns— was eclipsing his showy game and projections that he achieved in Toro's team (who was fired by the club's board in November of that year). After playing six seasons at the Italic club, Rieloff did not renew his contract in December 2010, so Audax board honored him for his years playing at Estadio Bicentenario de La Florida during a game with Unión Española.

After his departure from Audax Italiano, he was heavy linked with Universidad de Chile and Colo-Colo, but he refused them for an alleged offer from Argentina. Finally, on 15 January 2011, Rieloff was presented at Argentine Primera División side Gimnasia La Plata as club's new signing, which he reached a six-month deal.

Despite his good game in the brief revaluation of Audax through the 2010 annual championship (where they achieved a third place), later he didn't manage to have regularity either in his time at Gimnasia y Esgrima de La Plata or, later, in Colo-Colo, institution of unstable seasons during the 2011–2013 period.

== International career ==
His performance in Audax in 2006 allowed him being called up to the Chile football team (between that season and 2007), team which in that time was in a slow process of change that included a temporary period between 1998 FIFA World Cup and 2010 FIFA World Cup. Although the prolongation of Rieloff's good performance allowed him to be summoned by Nelson Acosta to 2007 Copa América, later he was not called up by Marcelo Bielsa during qualifiers road to South Africa (2007–2009) considering that he didn't play with right wings and in this position he commonly adapted to Mauricio Isla as a right midfielder, who had to Hugo Droguett or Gonzalo Fierro as substitutes.

== Post-retirement ==
Rieloff graduated as a football manager.

Rieloff was a shortlisted candidate to councillor for La Florida commune in the 2024 Chilean municipal elections.

== Honours ==
Individual

- El Gráfico's League Season Team: 2007, 2010
- ANFP Golden Ball League Season Team: 2010
