= Marco Medel =

Chilean footballer (born 1989)

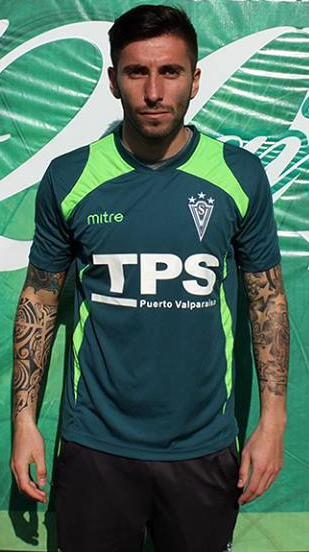
- Medel with Santiago Wanderers in 2014

Personal information
- Full name: Marco Antonio Medel De la Fuente
- Date of birth: 30 June 1989 (age 37)
- Place of birth: Santiago, Chile
- Height: 1.75 m (5 ft 9 in)
- Position: Midfielder

Team information
- Current team: Santiago City
- Number: 10

Youth career
- 2002–2006: Audax Italiano

Senior career*
Years	Team	Apps	(Gls)
2007–2014	Audax Italiano	135	(19)
2011	→ Colo-Colo (loan)	24	(2)
2012–2013	Audax Italiano B	8	(6)
2014–2015	Santiago Wanderers	28	(6)
2015–2016	Universidad Católica	25	(0)
2016–2017	O'Higgins	23	(1)
2017–2021	Santiago Wanderers	117	(9)
2021	Magallanes	9	(0)
2022–2024	Deportes Copiapó	70	(0)
2025–	Santiago City	6	(2)

International career^{‡}
2009	Chile U20	4	(0)
2009–2011	Chile U23	7	(0)
2015	Chile	1	(0)
- * Club domestic league appearances and goals as of 5 May 2025 ‡ National team caps and goals as of 20 January 2015

Marco Antonio Medel de la Fuente (born 30 June 1989) is a Chilean professional footballer who plays as a midfielder for Santiago City.

== Club career ==
Medel had started in the lower divisions of Audax Italiano which would debut in 2007 when the club was going through a great time having great figures like Carlos Villanueva, Fabian Orellana or Franco Di Santo, among others. Gradually he was taking regularly since his debut coming to play the 2008 Copa Libertadores but would consolidation in 2009.

On his return to Audax Italiano again would be one of the key pieces of equipment, with figure of this for the following seasons but all end abruptly in mid-2014 when he and two other players rescind contract by not cumplírseles respective clauses, 3 after this sign Huachipato as a free player but with the sale of the club to a sporting society handover would fall finally saturating in the Santiago Wanderers.

On 2 September 2021, Medel moved to Magallanes in the Primera B de Chile after being released from Santiago Wanderers.

== International career ==
Medel debuted in the Chile national under-20 football team led by Ivo Basay in friendly matches with Argentina and Uruguay before being summoned to the Under-20 2009 South American Championship which took place in Venezuela5 where his team failed to qualify for the world cup category. That same year the Under-21s to dispute the hopes 2009 Toulon Tournament where Chile tournament champion being crowned undisputed owner of that team.

He got his first call up to the senior Chile squad for a friendly against the United States in January 2015 and made his international debut in the match. He was named in the preliminary squad for the 2015 Copa America but was omitted from the final squad.

== Honours ==
Universidad Católica

- Primera División: 2015–16 Clausura

Santiago Wanderers

- Primera B: 2019
- Copa Chile: 2017

Chile U21

- Toulon Tournament: 2009
