= Milovan Mirošević =

Chilean footballer (born 1980)

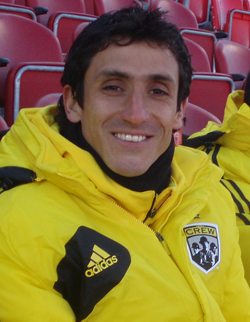
- Mirošević with Columbus Crew in 2012

Personal information
- Full name: Milován Petar Mirošević Albornoz
- Date of birth: 20 June 1980 (age 46)
- Place of birth: Santiago, Chile
- Height: 1.79 m (5 ft 10 in)
- Position: Attacking midfielder

Youth career
- 1992–1997: Universidad Católica

Senior career*
Years	Team	Apps	(Gls)
1997–2002	Universidad Católica	108	(25)
2003–2006	Racing Club	91	(11)
2006–2007	Beitar Jerusalem	41	(5)
2008	Argentinos Juniors	7	(1)
2008–2011	Universidad Católica	108	(65)
2012	Columbus Crew	26	(4)
2013–2014	Universidad Católica	38	(7)
2014–2016	Unión Española	41	(12)
2016–2017	Universidad Católica	3	(0)
Total		463	(130)

International career
1997	Chile U17		
1998	Chile B	1	(0)
1999	Chile U20	8	(1)
2001–2011	Chile	25	(3)

Managerial career
- 2022–2023: Chile U20 (assistant)
- 2025–: Universidad Católica (assistant)
- * Club domestic league appearances and goals

Milovan Petar Mirošević Albornoz (Spanish pronunciation: [miˈɾoseβitʃ]; born 20 June 1980) is a Chilean football coach and former footballer. He spent the majority of his playing career as an attacking midfielder for Universidad Católica. He is also commonly known as Milo Mirosevic.

== Club career ==
Mirošević began his football career with one of the biggest Chilean football clubs Universidad Católica in 1992. His professional debut at the age of 17 in 1997 occurred in part due to a strike by professional footballers which saw players of the youth squads compete in the Torneo Apertura 1997. Mirošević's debut with Catolica ended in a 4–1 win over rivals Colo-Colo at Estadio San Carlos de Apoquindo.

in 2000, after two seasons with the reserves team, Mirošević became a regular in Católica's starting eleven. In 2002, under coach Juvenal Olmos, Mirosevic was the star of the club's win of the Apertura.

After 2002 he was transferred to Racing Club of Argentina where he obtained mixed results. He was then transferred from Racing to Beitar Jerusalem FC, winning the 2006–07 Israeli Premier League. In 2008, he returned to Argentina signing with Argentinos Juniors. Mirošević finally returned to Universidad Católica in June 2008 as one of the new players brought in for the Clausura Tournament. He holds the current record of scoring in 5 consecutive matches against Universidad de Chile. In his time back with Católica he captained the club and helped capture the league title in 2010 and the 2011 Copa Chile.

On 4 January 2012 Mirošević joined Major League Soccer club Columbus Crew on a multi-year deal. Columbus Crew head coach Robert Warzycha described Mirošević by saying, "He is a good passer, very technical, has good speed, and can shoot from distance." However, his stay in Columbus lasted only one season and he was released by the club on 20 January 2013. Immediately upon his release Mirošević signed with one of his former sides, Universidad Católica.

== International career ==
He represented Chile U17 at the 1997 South American U-17 Championship and Chile U20 at the 1999 South American U-20 Championship. In addition, he played for Chile B against England B on 10 February 1998. Chile won by 2–1.

Mirosevic received his first opportunity with the Chile national team under Juvenal Olmos' tenure as manager. During these World Cup qualifying games, Mirošević scored twice, once against Argentina and once against Uruguay.

During the 2010 World Cup qualifiers, Marcelo Bielsa called Mirosevic up for the first games against Uruguay and Paraguay, without getting the chance to play. After four years of not being called up by the national team, on 10 November 2011, he was called up by Claudio Borghi to fill in after some suspensions were in effect, getting the chance to play as a substitute during one of the games.

== Managerial career ==
Despite he graduated as a Football Manager, he didn't accept an offer to make an internship at the C.D. Universidad Católica, but he has worked as Promotion Coordinator for the youth players of the same club. In April 2022, he left his job at the Universidad Católica to begin his managerial career as the assistant coach of Patricio Ormazábal of Chile U20.

In 2023, Mirosevic served as sport director of Deportes Colina. In the second half of 2024, he returned to Universidad Católica as head of the youth system. In May 2025, he assumed as assistant coach of Rodrigo Valenzuela.

== Personal life ==
He is the cousin of politician Vlado Mirosevic and he is of Croatian descent.

== Titles ==
Universidad Católica

- Primera División: 2002-A, 2010, 2016-C
- Copa Chile: 2011
- Supercopa de Chile: 2016

Beitar Jerusalem

- Ligat Ha'al: 2007
