= Colo-Colo B =

Chilean football club

- Full name: Club Social y Deportivo Colo-Colo B
- Nickname: La Filial
- Founded: 1999; 27 years ago
- Ground: Estadio Monumental David Arellano; Macul, Santiago, Chile
- Capacity: 45,953
- Owner: Carlos Tapia
- Manager: Rodolfo Madrid
- League: Chilean Segunda División
- Website: http://www.colocolo.cl
Home colours	Away colours

Club Deportivo y Social Colo-Colo B, usually called Colo-Colo B, is a Chilean football team from Santiago. They are the reserve team of Colo-Colo, and are currently competing in the third tier of Chilean football, the Segunda División.

Founded in January 1999, the club played its first season in the Chilean Third Division, via an under–23 team of the club called Colo-Colo Junior, in where players like Sebastián González and Luis Ignacio Quinteros, become to stars. After the bankruptcy of Colo-Colo in 2001, the club was dissolved because of the financial requirements that the team needed, despite the sport's success.

In January 2007, thanks to the success of the coach Claudio Borghi in the bench of Colo-Colo, the reserve team again was founded thanks to Gabriel Ruíz–Tagle's management, playing again in the third level of the Chilean football league system, but after another problem that affected in the reserve's team existence was the ANFA's controversial that established the rule that prevented to the filial teams in play at the Third division.

In December 2011, after the approval of the Asociación de Fútbol Profesional de Chile in create a new Segunda División, the club was re-established for play in that tournament, debuting the next season with a 1–0 defeat with the reserve team of Rangers at the Estadio Fiscal de Talca.

== Club history ==
=== Amateur era ===
==== Colo-Colo Junior ====
Founded in 1937, with the reserve team of Colo-Colo, playing in the Serie B, the former Chilean second division, was immediately dissolved due to financial problems of that level, but however, was re-established in 1999, under the name of Colo-Colo Junior, where players like Sebastián González, Luis Ignacio Quinteros become stars with the passing of time, being champions after with the club. Despite the sport success, the club again was dissolved, now due to the financial problems of Colo-Colo, that led the team to bankruptcy.

=== Professional era ===
==== Inaugural season ====
After of the approval of the Segunda División on 23 November 2011, and the confirmation on 21 February of the next year, the club debuted against Rangers B at the Estadio Fiscal de Talca, in a 1–0 defeat with a goal of Eduardo Saldaña in the 83rd minute. During that game, also the club played with some players of the first team like, winning the next week 5–0 to Fernández Vial at the Estadio Monumental David Arellano, only with the presence of Osmar Molinas and Miguel Ángel González, players of the first team, on difference of the last game in where the club used to five players of the first team.

== Stadium ==
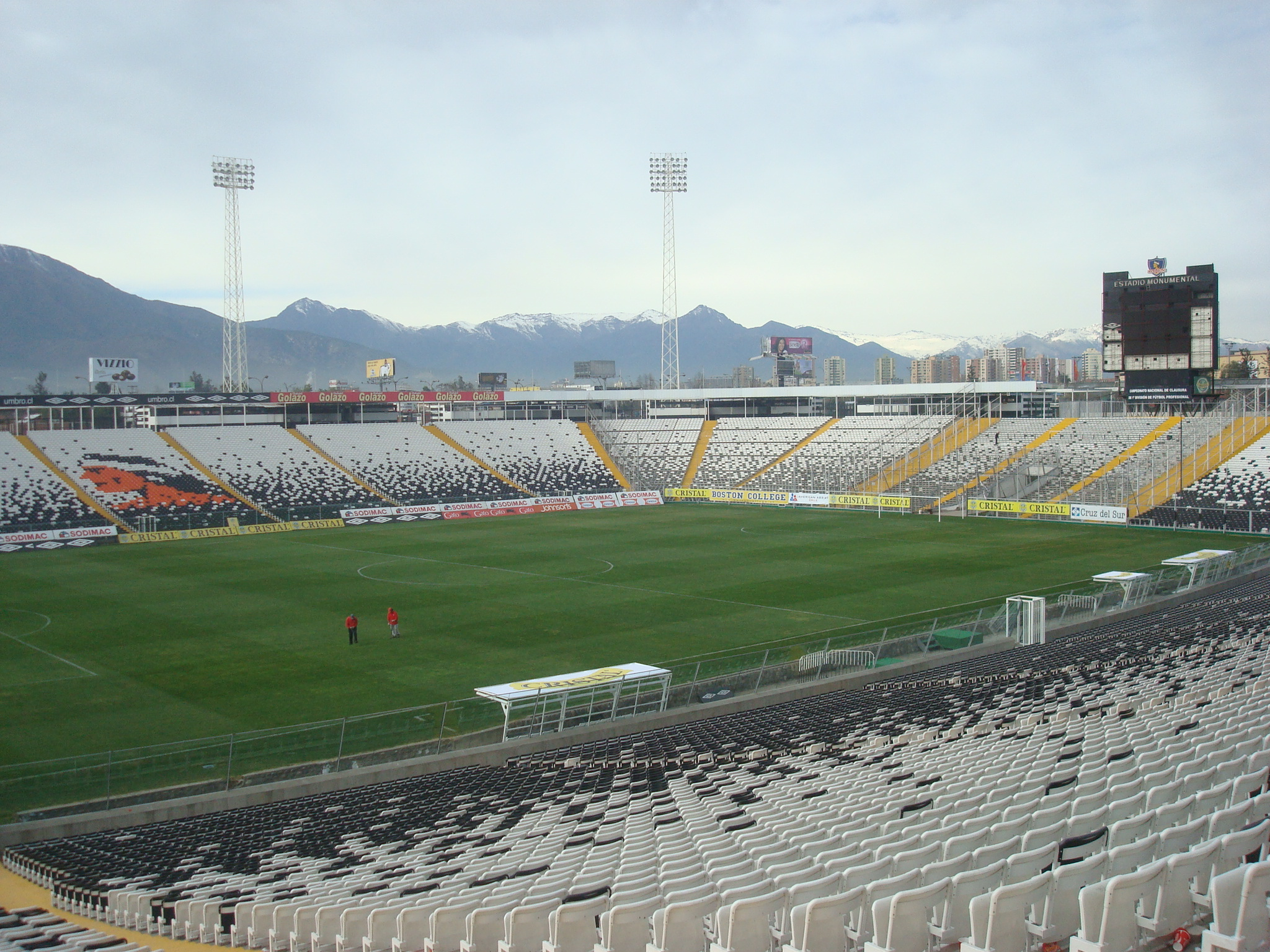
Colo-Colo's stadium

Colo-Colo's stadium, Estadio Monumental David Arellano, is located in Macul, Santiago and has a 45,953 capacity. Colo-Colo inaugurated the stadium on September 30, 1989, with a match against Peñarol. The home team went on to win by a final score of 2–1.

=== Facilities ===
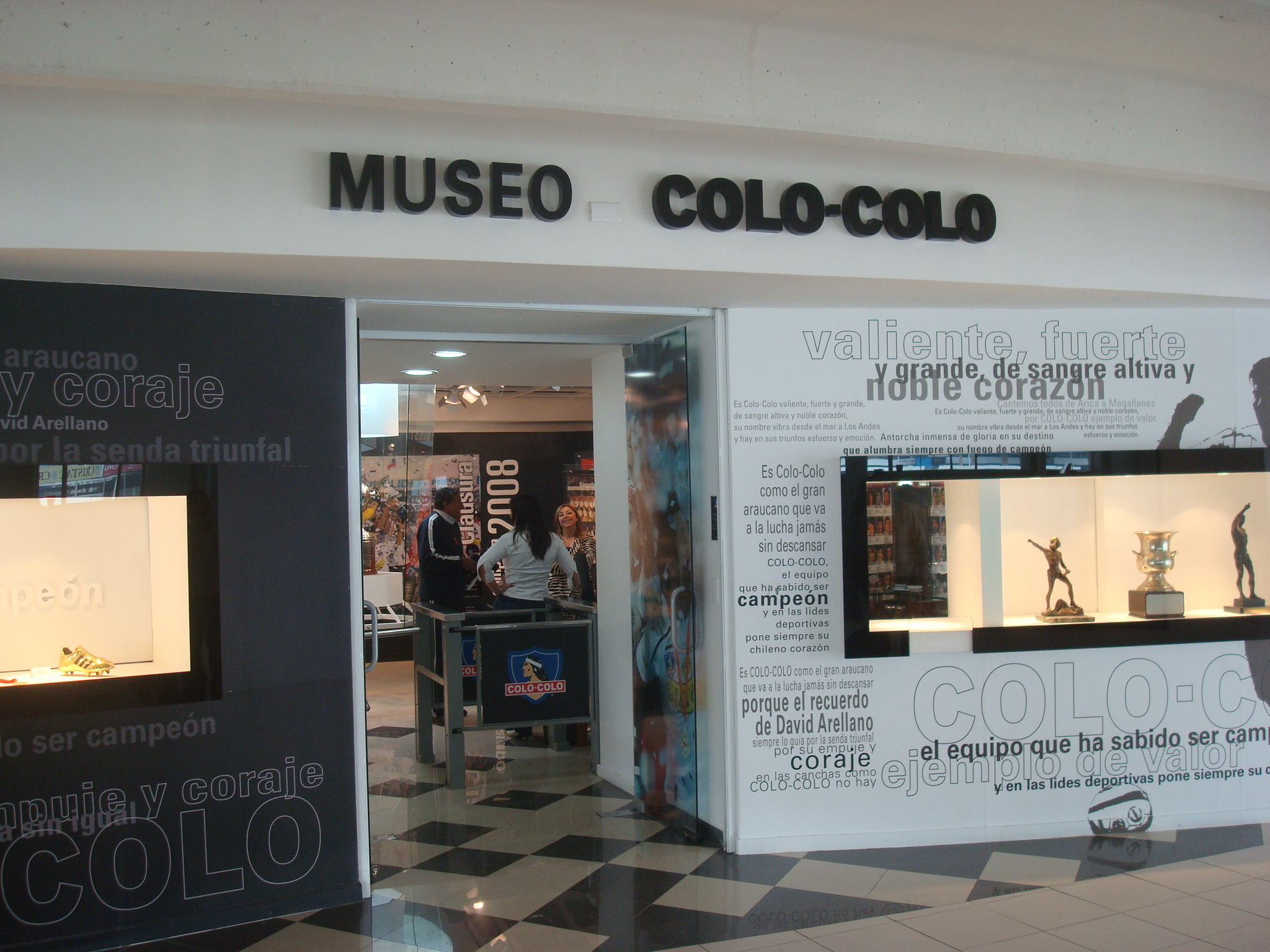
The entrance to Colo-Colo's museum.

Construction began in early 2007 of the Casa Alba (White House) to house Colo-Colo's youth players. Casa Alba has an area of 1156.24 square meters and a carrying capacity of 64 youth cadets. The facility includes gyms, dormitories, recreation rooms, and study.

Inaugurated in June 2009, The Colo-Colo museum houses the national championship trophies won by the club, the replica of the Copa Libertadores achieved in 1991, the shirts worn by the club, and a model of the stadium. The museum also features special sections dedicated to events such as when Colo-Colo went unbeaten in 1937 and 1941, the Colo-Colo of 1973, the three peat winning championship team between 1989 and 1991, and the 4 time in a row winning championship teams between 2006 and 2007.
