= Estadio Monumental David Arellano =

Football stadium in Macul, Chile

Estadio Monumental
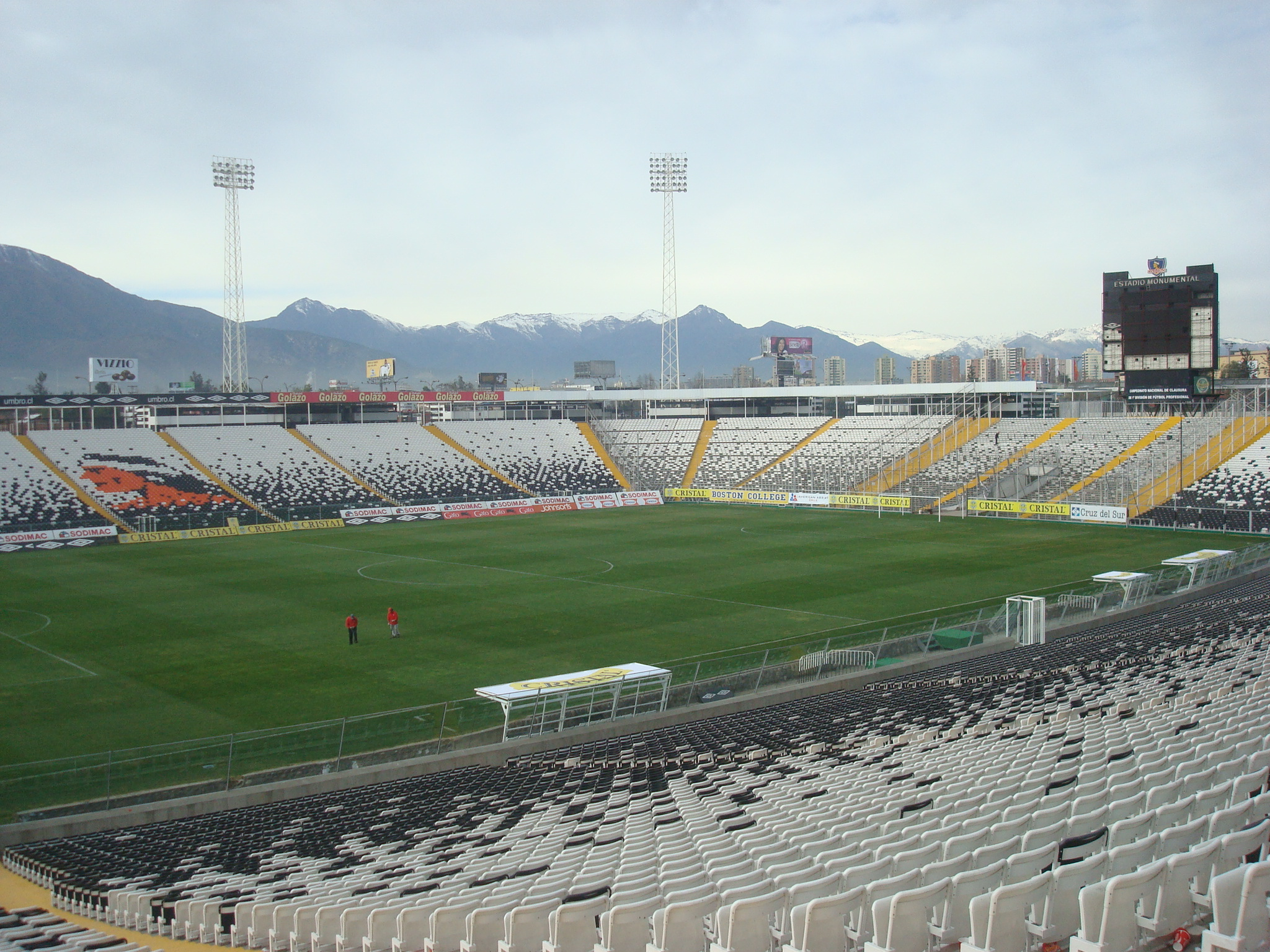
- Interactive map of Estadio Monumental
- Full name: Estadio Monumental
- Location: Macul, Santiago, Chile
- Coordinates: 33°30′24″S 70°36′21″W
- Owner: Colo-Colo
- Operator: Colo-Colo
- Capacity: 47,000; 43,595 (international)
- Field size: 105 x 72 m

Construction
- Built: 1956
- Opened: 1975 / 1989
- Architect: Mario Recordón
- Project manager: Antonio labán

Tenants
- Colo-Colo (1975–1976, 1989–present); Chile national football team (selected matches)

The Estadio Monumental is a football stadium in Macul, south-east of the centre of the Chilean capital Santiago. It serves as the home ground of Colo-Colo, and on occasions also for other clubs and the national football team. The stadium has a current spectator capacity of 47,347. The actual playing field is named after David Arellano, the founder of Colo-Colo; therefore, on occasions the whole stadium is referred to as Estadio Monumental David Arellano.

== Use by Colo-Colo ==
The stadium was first opened in 1975 with a double-header in front of 25,599 people. In the first match Santiago Morning and Santiago Wanderers drew 1-1 and in the main event Colo-Colo defeated Deportes Aviación 1-0, Carlos Orellana being the scorer. However, the stadium proved unsuitable for ongoing use, and therefore only five more matches took place there for the time being.

Completed in its current form in 1989, it was reopened in September of that year with a match between Colo-Colo and CA Peñarol from Uruguay, which the hosts won 2-1, thanks to goals by Marcelo Barticciotto and Leonel Herrera. The official capacity of the stadium then was between 62,500 and 65,000 spectators. The highest ever recorded attendance when 69,305 spectators saw a league match between Colo-Colo and Club Universidad de Chile in 1992. The stadium was in 1991 home to the second Copa Libertadores final, won by Colo-Colo 3-0, making it the sole Chilean club to win the trophy.

Accidents, including a fatality in 1993, prompted various modernisations which led to a reduction of the capacity to the current 47,000 spectators. In the 2016-17 season, Colo-Colo drew an average home league attendance of 21,509 for the Apertura and 23,229 for the Clausura.

== International matches ==
The stadium is also rented out to club Santiago Morning and other Chilean teams that require holding games on the international tournament scale.

As well as hosting club teams, Estadio Monumental has held seven games of the Chile national football team when the Estadio Nacional, the main football stadium of the country, is unavailable. In 1997, Ivan Zamorano scored five goals for Chile in a 6-0 win over Venezuela during a France 1998 World Cup qualifier. In 2009, Chile drew 2-2 in another qualifier against Venezuela for the South Africa 2010 World Cup, and won 1-0 against Ecuador for a qualifier in the same competition. In 2012, Chile played two qualifiers for the Brazil 2014 World Cup at the Estadio Monumental, winning 4-2 against Peru, and losing 1-3 against Colombia. Two international friendly matches have been held the stadium: a 2-0 win for Chile over Uruguay in 2010, and a 4-0 Chilean victory over Estonia in 2011.

=== 2015 Copa América ===
Date	Time (GMT−3)	Team #1	Res.	Team #2	Round	Attendance
June 17, 2015	21:00	Brazil	0–1	Colombia	Group C	44,008
June 21, 2015	18:30	Brazil	2–1	Venezuela	Group C	33,284

== Concerts ==
The American rock band Pearl Jam played at the stadium on November 16, 2011, as part of their 20th anniversary tour. The hard rock band Guns N' Roses performed at the stadium during their Not In This Lifetime...Tour on September 29, 2017 with The Who. The hip hop and rap artist Kendrick Lamar performed at this stadium during his Grand National Tour on October 7, 2025.

== Owner ==
Its principal tenant and owner is the corporate entity Blanco y Negro that runs Colo-Colo and for which Chilean billionaire and President Sebastián Piñera was a major shareholder.

== Average attendances ==
Tenants	League season	Home games	Average attendance
Colo-Colo	2023	15	27,327
Colo-Colo	2022	15	18,843
