= 2010 Toulon Tournament squads =

Below are the rosters for the 2010 Toulon Tournament.

== Group A ==
=== Ivory Coast ===
Head coach: Alain Gouamene

| No. | Pos. | Player | Date of birth (age) | Caps | Goals | Club |
|---|---|---|---|---|---|---|
| 1 | GK | Clovis Tahourou | 25 December 1989 (aged 20) | 0 | 0 | (Ivorian Football Federation) AFAD Djékanou |
| 2 | DF | Mamadou Bagayoko | 31 December 1989 (aged 20) | 0 | 0 | (Slovak Football Association) Slovan Bratislava |
| 3 | DF | Ali Vanomo Bamba | 2 July 1991 (aged 18) | 0 | 0 | (French Football Federation) Le Mans |
| 4 | DF | Soumahoro Johnson | 27 February 1988 (aged 22) | 0 | 0 | (French Football Federation) Amiens |
| 5 | DF | Cheick Touré | 16 December 1988 (aged 21) | 14 | 0 | (The Football Association) Fulham |
| 6 | MF | Alassane Koné | 26 September 1989 (aged 20) | 0 | 0 | (Royal Belgian Football Association) Standard Liège |
| 7 | FW | Abdul Moustapha | 9 June 1988 (aged 21) | 0 | 0 | (Portuguese Football Federation) Trofense |
| 8 | FW | Yannick Boli | 13 January 1988 (aged 22) | 0 | 0 | (French Football Federation) Nîmes |
| 9 | FW | Bakary Saré | 5 May 1990 (aged 20) | 5 | 0 | (Royal Belgian Football Association) Anderlecht |
| 10 | MF | Yacoub Meite | 10 February 1990 (aged 20) | 0 | 0 | (Swiss Football Association) Sion II |
| 11 | FW | Moussa Koné | 12 February 1990 (aged 20) | 0 | 0 | (Italian Football Federation) Atalanta Primavera |
| 12 | FW | Giovanni Sio | 23 December 1990 (aged 19) | 0 | 0 | (Swiss Football Association) Sion |
| 13 | DF | Brice Dja Djedje | 31 December 1989 (aged 20) | 0 | 0 | (French Football Federation) Paris Saint-Germain |
| 14 | DF | Tiecoura Coulibaly | 4 May 1988 (aged 22) | 0 | 0 | (Ivorian Football Federation) Stella Club d'Adjamé |
| 15 | MF | Moustapha Traoré | 5 March 1991 (aged 19) | 0 | 0 | (French Football Federation) Sète |
| 16 | GK | Ibrahim Koné | 5 December 1989 (aged 20) | 0 | 0 | (French Football Federation) Boulogne |
| 17 | MF | Edmond Ogou Akichi | 24 April 1990 (aged 20) | 0 | 0 | (Ivorian Football Federation) AFAD Djékanou |
| 18 | FW | Yannick Sagbo | 12 April 1988 (aged 22) | 0 | 0 | (French Football Federation) Monaco |
| 19 | FW | Gerard Gohou | 29 December 1988 (aged 21) | 0 | 0 | (Swiss Football Association) Neuchâtel Xamax |
| 20 | FW | Serges Déblé | 21 January 1991 (aged 19) | 0 | 0 | (French Football Federation) Angers |

=== France ===
Head coach: Patrick Gonfalone

| No. | Pos. | Player | Date of birth (age) | Caps | Goals | Club |
|---|---|---|---|---|---|---|
| 1 | GK | Yohann Thuram-Ulien | 25 December 1989 (aged 20) | 0 | 0 | (French Football Federation) Monaco |
| 2 | DF | Paul Baysse | 31 December 1989 (aged 20) | 0 | 0 | (French Football Federation) Sedan |
| 3 | DF | Frédéric Duplus | 2 July 1991 (aged 18) | 0 | 0 | (French Football Federation) Sochaux |
| 4 | DF | Marvin Esor | 21 July 1989 (aged 20) | 0 | 0 | (French Football Federation) Arles-Avignon |
| 5 | DF | Thomas Heurtaux | 16 December 1988 (aged 21) | 0 | 0 | (French Football Federation) Caen |
| 6 | DF | Lamine Koné | 26 September 1989 (aged 20) | 0 | 0 | (French Football Federation) Châteauroux |
| 7 | MF | Tripy Makonda | 9 June 1988 (aged 21) | 0 | 0 | (French Football Federation) Paris Saint-Germain |
| 8 | DF | Loïc Nestor | 13 January 1988 (aged 22) | 0 | 0 | (French Football Federation) Le Havre |
| 9 | MF | Younès Belhanda | 25 February 1990 (aged 20) | 0 | 0 | (French Football Federation) Montpellier |
| 10 | MF | Alfred N'Diaye | 10 February 1990 (aged 20) | 0 | 0 | (French Football Federation) Nancy |
| 11 | MF | Loïc Poujol | 12 February 1990 (aged 20) | 0 | 0 | (French Football Federation) Sochaux |
| 12 | MF | Morgan Schneiderlin | 23 December 1990 (aged 19) | 0 | 0 | (The Football Association) Southampton |
| 13 | FW | Thibault Bourgeois | 31 December 1989 (aged 20) | 0 | 0 | (French Football Federation) Metz |
| 14 | MF | Yacine Brahimi | 8 February 1990 (aged 20) | 0 | 0 | (French Football Federation) Clermont |
| 15 | FW | Edouard Butin | 5 March 1991 (aged 19) | 0 | 0 | (French Football Federation) Sochaux |
| 16 | GK | Rémi Pillot | 27 July 1990 (aged 19) | 0 | 0 | (French Football Federation) Nancy |
| 17 | MF | Mathieu Dossevi | 24 April 1990 (aged 20) | 0 | 0 | (French Football Federation) Le Mans |
| 18 | FW | Magaye Gueye | 6 July 1990 (aged 19) | 0 | 0 | (French Football Federation) Strasbourg |
| 19 | FW | Lynel Kitambala | 29 December 1988 (aged 21) | 0 | 0 | (French Football Federation) Dijon |
| 20 | FW | Jérémy Pied | 21 January 1991 (aged 19) | 0 | 0 | (French Football Federation) Metz |

=== Colombia ===
Head coach: Eduardo Lara Lozano

| No. | Pos. | Player | Date of birth (age) | Caps | Goals | Club |
|---|---|---|---|---|---|---|
| 1 | GK | Andrés Mosquera | 15 June 1988 (aged 21) | 0 | 0 | (Colombian Football Federation) Bogotá |
| 2 | DF | Luciano Ospina | 18 February 1991 (aged 19) | 0 | 0 | (Argentine Football Association) Huracán |
| 3 | DF | Pedro Franco | 23 April 1991 (aged 19) | 0 | 0 | (Colombian Football Federation) Millonarios |
| 4 | DF | Santiago Arias | 28 February 1989 (aged 21) | 0 | 0 | (Colombian Football Federation) La Equidad |
| 5 | DF | Juan David Diaz | 17 August 1989 (aged 20) | 0 | 0 | (Colombian Football Federation) Deportivo Pasto |
| 6 | MF | Deiner Córdoba | 21 April 1992 (aged 18) | 0 | 0 | (Colombian Football Federation) Deportivo Pereira |
| 7 | FW | Luis Muriel | 16 April 1991 (aged 19) | 0 | 0 | (Italian Football Federation) Udinese |
| 8 | MF | Edwin Cardona | 25 June 1988 (aged 21) | 0 | 0 | (Colombian Football Federation) Atlético Nacional |
| 9 | FW | Fabián Castillo | 17 June 1992 (aged 17) | 2 | 1 | (Colombian Football Federation) Deportivo Cali |
| 10 | MF | Michael Ortega | 6 April 1991 (aged 19) | 0 | 0 | (Colombian Football Federation) Deportivo Cali |
| 11 | MF | Yesinguer Jiménez | 13 January 1991 (aged 19) | 5 | 4 | (Colombian Football Federation) Once Caldas |
| 12 | GK | Juan Sebastián Villate | 14 February 1991 (aged 19) | 0 | 0 | (Colombian Football Federation) Millonarios |
| 13 | DF | Juan David Cabezas | 27 February 1991 (aged 19) | 0 | 0 | (Colombian Football Federation) Deportivo Cali |
| 14 | MF | Javier Calle | 19 April 1991 (aged 19) | 0 | 0 | (Colombian Football Federation) Independiente Medellín |
| 15 | MF | Juan Andrés Bolaños | 22 July 1991 (aged 18) | 0 | 0 | (Colombian Football Federation) Academia |
| 16 | FW | Miguel Julio | 21 February 1991 (aged 19) | 1 | 1 | (Colombian Football Federation) Independiente Medellín |
| 17 | FW | José Izquierdo | 7 July 1992 (aged 17) | 0 | 0 | (Colombian Football Federation) Deportivo Pereira |
| 18 | MF | Orlando Berrío | 14 February 1991 (aged 19) | 6 | 0 | (Colombian Football Federation) Atlético Nacional |
| 19 | MF | Sebastián Viafara | 2 April 1990 (aged 20) | 0 | 0 | (Colombian Football Federation) Deportes Quindío |
| 20 | FW | Stiven Mendoza | 27 July 1992 (aged 17) | 0 | 0 | (Colombian Football Federation) Envigado |

=== Japan ===
Head coach: Akihiro Nishimura

| No. | Pos. | Player | Date of birth (age) | Caps | Club |
|---|---|---|---|---|---|
| 1 | GK | Koki Otani | 8 April 1989 (aged 21) | | (Japan) Urawa Red Diamonds |
| 2 | DF | Kazunari Ono | 4 August 1989 (aged 20) | | (Japan) Albirex Niigata |
| 3 | DF | Yusuke Higa | 15 May 1989 (aged 21) | | (Japan) Ryutsu Keizai University F.C. |
| 4 | DF | Shunya Suganuma | 17 May 1990 (aged 20) | | (Japan) Gamba Osaka |
| 5 | DF | Takefumi Toma | 21 March 1989 (aged 21) | | (Japan) Kashima Antlers |
| 6 | DF | Yuki Yoshida | 3 May 1989 (aged 21) | | (Japan) Kawasaki Frontale |
| 7 | DF | Takumi Yamada | 25 November 1989 (aged 20) | | (Japan) Montedio Yamagata |
| 8 | MF | Fumiya Kogure | 28 June 1989 (aged 20) | | (Japan) Albirex Niigata |
| 9 | FW | Yuya Osako | 18 May 1990 (aged 20) | | (Japan) Kashima Antlers |
| 10 | FW | Ryohei Yamazaki | 14 March 1989 (aged 21) | | (Japan) Júbilo Iwata |
| 11 | MF | Kyohei Noborizato | 13 November 1990 (aged 19) | | (Japan) Kawasaki Frontale |
| 12 | MF | Hiroyuki Abe | 5 July 1989 (aged 20) | | (Japan) Kwansei Gakuin University |
| 13 | MF | Takuya Marutani | 30 May 1989 (aged 20) | | (Japan) Sanfrecce Hiroshima |
| 14 | MF | Shohei Otsuka | 11 April 1990 (aged 20) | | (Japan) Gamba Osaka |
| 15 | MF | Tsubasa Yokotake | 30 August 1989 (aged 20) | | (Japan) Sanfrecce Hiroshima |
| 16 | DF | Yusuke Muta | 22 September 1990 (aged 19) | | (Japan) Fukuoka University |
| 17 | MF | Kohei Shimizu | 30 April 1989 (aged 21) | | (Japan) Sanfrecce Hiroshima |
| 18 | GK | Yutaro Hara | 23 April 1990 (aged 20) | | (Japan) Sanfrecce Hiroshima |
| 19 | FW | Yuki Oshitani | 23 September 1989 (aged 20) | | (Japan) FC Gifu |
| 20 | FW | Yohei Hayashi | 16 July 1989 (aged 20) | | (Japan) Chuo University |

== Group B ==
=== Chile ===
Head coach: (Chile) César Vaccia

| No. | Pos. | Player | Date of birth (age) | Caps | Goals | Club |
|---|---|---|---|---|---|---|
| 1 | GK | Cristopher Toselli | 15 June 1988 (aged 21) | 0 | 0 | (Football Federation of Chile) Universidad Católica |
| 2 | DF | Carlos Labrín | 2 December 1990 (aged 19) | 0 | 0 | (Football Federation of Chile) Huachipato |
| 3 | DF | Sebastián Toro | 2 February 1990 (aged 20) | 0 | 0 | (Football Federation of Chile) Colo-Colo |
| 4 | DF | Rodolfo González | 28 February 1989 (aged 21) | 0 | 0 | (Football Federation of Chile) Cobreloa |
| 5 | DF | Bastián Arce | 17 August 1989 (aged 20) | 0 | 0 | (Football Federation of Chile) Santiago Morning |
| 6 | DF | Juan Abarca (c) | 7 December 1988 (aged 21) | 0 | 0 | (Football Federation of Chile) Huachipato |
| 7 | FW | Eduardo Vargas | 20 November 1989 (aged 20) | 0 | 0 | (Football Federation of Chile) Cobreloa |
| 8 | MF | Luis Pavez | 25 June 1988 (aged 21) | 0 | 0 | (Football Federation of Chile) Colo-Colo |
| 9 | FW | Matías Rubio | 8 August 1988 (aged 21) | 2 | 1 | (Football Federation of Chile) Universidad Católica |
| 10 | MF | Cristóbal Jorquera | 4 August 1988 (aged 21) | 0 | 0 | (Football Federation of Chile) Colo-Colo |
| 11 | FW | Gerson Martínez | 10 January 1989 (aged 21) | 5 | 4 | (Football Federation of Chile) San Luis |
| 12 | GK | Raúl Olivares | 17 April 1988 (aged 22) | 0 | 0 | (Football Federation of Chile) Colo-Colo |
| 13 | DF | Agustín Parra | 10 June 1989 (aged 20) | 0 | 0 | (Football Federation of Chile) Santiago Wanderers |
| 14 | MF | Marco Medel | 6 June 1989 (aged 20) | 2 | 2 | (Football Federation of Chile) Audax Italiano |
| 15 | MF | Esteban Carvajal | 9 February 1988 (aged 22) | 0 | 0 | (Football Federation of Chile) Santiago Morning |
| 16 | FW | Carlos Muñoz | 21 April 1989 (aged 21) | 1 | 1 | (Football Federation of Chile) Santiago Wanderers |
| 17 | DF | Rafael Caroca | 18 July 1989 (aged 20) | 0 | 0 | (Football Federation of Chile) Colo-Colo |
| 18 | MF | Eugenio Mena | 18 July 1988 (aged 21) | 6 | 0 | (Football Federation of Chile) Santiago Wanderers |
| 19 | MF | Sebastián Ubilla | 9 August 1990 (aged 19) | 0 | 0 | (Football Federation of Chile) Santiago Wanderers |
| 20 | FW | Kevin Harbottle | 8 June 1990 (aged 19) | 0 | 0 | (Football Federation of Chile) O'Higgins |

=== Denmark ===
Head coach: Keld Bordinggaard

| No. | Pos. | Player | Date of birth (age) | Caps | Goals | Club |
|---|---|---|---|---|---|---|
| 1 | GK | Nicklas Højlund | 3 June 1990 (aged 19) | 2 | 0 | (Danish Football Association) Lyngby |
| 2 | DF | Frederik Krabbe | 10 March 1988 (aged 22) | 11 | 0 | (Danish Football Association) AGF |
| 3 | DF | Mathias Jørgensen | 23 April 1990 (aged 20) | 5 | 0 | (Danish Football Association) Copenhagen |
| 4 | DF | Andreas Bjelland | 11 July 1988 (aged 21) | 8 | 0 | (Danish Football Association) Nordsjælland |
| 5 | DF | Michael Lumb | 9 January 1988 (aged 22) | 7 | 0 | (Russian Football Union) Zenit Saint Petersburg |
| 6 | MF | Kasper Povlsen | 29 September 1988 (aged 21) | 7 | 0 | (Danish Football Association) AGF |
| 7 | MF | Matti Lund Nielsen | 8 May 1988 (aged 22) | 10 | 1 | (Danish Football Association) Nordsjælland |
| 8 | MF | Mike Jensen | 19 February 1988 (aged 22) | 16 | 2 | (Danish Football Association) Brøndby |
| 9 | FW | Patrick Mortensen | 13 July 1989 (aged 20) | 3 | 0 | (Danish Football Association) Lyngby |
| 10 | FW | Emil Lyng | 3 August 1989 (aged 20) | 4 | 0 | (Royal Belgian Football Association) Zulte Waregem |
| 11 | FW | Henrik Dalsgaard | 27 July 1989 (aged 20) | 4 | 0 | (Danish Football Association) AaB |
| 12 | DF | Mads Fenger | 10 September 1990 (aged 19) | 1 | 0 | (Danish Football Association) Randers |
| 13 | DF | Brian Hamalainen | 29 May 1989 (aged 20) | 7 | 1 | (Danish Football Association) Lyngby |
| 14 | MF | Mads Albæk | 14 January 1990 (aged 20) | 6 | 0 | (Danish Football Association) Midtjylland |
| 15 | MF | Şaban Özdoğan | 14 March 1990 (aged 20) | 0 | 0 | (Danish Football Association) Copenhagen |
| 16 | GK | Mikkel Andersen | 17 December 1988 (aged 21) | 3 | 0 | (The Football Association) Bristol Rovers |
| 17 | MF | Andreas Laudrup | 10 November 1990 (aged 19) | 2 | 1 | (Danish Football Association) Nordsjælland |
| 18 | MF | Mads Jessen | 14 October 1989 (aged 20) | 0 | 0 | (Danish Football Association) SønderjyskE |
| 19 | FW | Søren Frederiksen | 7 August 1989 (aged 20) | 4 | 1 | (Danish Football Association) SønderjyskE |
| 20 | FW | Nicki Bille Nielsen | 7 February 1988 (aged 22) | 7 | 2 | (Danish Football Association) Nordsjælland |

=== Qatar ===
Head coach: (Denmark) Jacobus Adriaanse

| No. | Pos. | Player | Date of birth (age) | Caps | Goals | Club |

GK Saad Abdulla Al-Sheeb Al-Sadd Qatar GK Muhannad Naim Hussain Al-Sadd Qatar FW Ali Hassan Afif Al-Sadd Qatar FW Hassan Khaled Al Haydos Al-Sadd Qatar MF Mohammed Al Yazidi Al-Sadd Qatar MF Abdulkareem Al-Ali Al-Rayyan SC Qatar DF Khaled Abulraaof Al Zerequi Al-Saad Qatar FW Moayad Hassan Al-Gharafa Qatar DF Murad Naji Kamal Hussein Al-Rayyan Qatar DF Khalid Muftah Mayuuf Al-Wakrah Qatar DF Al-Mahdi Ali Mukhtar Al-Sadd Qatar MF Nasser Saad Nabil Saleem Al-Sadd Qatar MF Fadhi Said Omar Qatar SC Qatar DF Abdul Ghafoor Murad Al-Rayyan Qatar DF Hamood Al-Yazidi Al-Sadd Qatar FW Abdulaziz Al-Anzari Al-Sadd Qatar DF Ziad Mohammed Al-Khatib Al-Arabi Qatar MF Hamad Al-Obeidi Al-Rayyan SC Qatar DF Tahir Zakaria Muhammad Al-Sadd Qatar MF Abdelaziz Hatem Mohammed Abdullah Al-Arabi SC Qatar

=== Russia ===
Head coach (Russia) Igor Kolyvanov

| No. | Pos. | Player | Date of birth (age) | Caps | Goals | Club |
|---|---|---|---|---|---|---|
| 1 | GK | Sergei Pesyakov | 16 December 1988 (aged 21) | 10 | 0 | (Russian Football Union) Spartak Moscow |
| 2 | DF | Sergei Parshivlyuk | 18 March 1989 (aged 21) | 10 | 0 | (Russian Football Union) Spartak Moscow |
| 3 | DF | Yevgeni Makeyev | 24 July 1989 (aged 20) | 9 | 0 | (Russian Football Union) Spartak Moscow |
| 4 | MF | Pavel Mamayev | 17 September 1988 (aged 21) | 10 | 5 | (Russian Football Union) CSKA Moscow |
| 5 | DF | Anton Vlasov | 11 May 1989 (aged 21) | 7 | 0 | (Russian Football Union) Volga Nizhny Novgorod |
| 6 | DF | Sergei Morozov | 3 March 1989 (aged 21) | 1 | 0 | (Russian Football Union) Amkar Perm |
| 7 | MF | Yevgeni Balyaikin | 19 May 1988 (aged 21) | 8 | 3 | (Russian Football Union) Rubin Kazan |
| 8 | FW | Vladimir Dyadyun | 12 July 1988 (aged 21) | 1 | 0 | (Russian Football Union) Spartak Nalchik |
| 9 | FW | Igor Portnyagin | 7 January 1989 (aged 21) | 1 | 0 | (Russian Football Union) Rubin Kazan |
| 10 | MF | Aleksei Ionov | 18 February 1989 (aged 21) | 8 | 1 | (Russian Football Union) Zenit Saint Petersburg |
| 11 | FW | Aleksandr Prudnikov | 24 February 1989 (aged 21) | 16 | 7 | (Russian Football Union) Tom Tomsk |
| 12 | GK | Maksim Shumailov | 2 May 1990 (aged 20) | 0 | 0 | (Russian Football Union) Amkar Perm |
| 13 | DF | Mikhail Badyautdinov | 11 October 1989 (aged 20) | 1 | 0 | (Russian Football Union) Rubin Kazan |
| 14 | MF | Anton Sosnin | 27 January 1990 (aged 20) | 6 | 0 | (Russian Football Union) Zenit Saint Petersburg |
| 15 | MF | Artur Valikayev | 8 January 1988 (aged 22) | 5 | 0 | (Russian Football Union) Rostov |
| 16 | DF | Mikhail Mischenko | 27 June 1989 (aged 20) | 1 | 0 | (Russian Football Union) Rubin Kazan |
| 17 | FW | Fyodor Smolov | 9 February 1990 (aged 20) | 11 | 3 | (Russian Football Union) Dynamo Moscow |
| 18 | MF | Aleksandr Sapeta | 28 June 1989 (aged 20) | 1 | 0 | (Russian Football Union) Saturn Moscow Oblast |
| 19 | MF | Yuri Kirillov | 19 January 1990 (aged 20) | 1 | 0 | (Russian Football Union) Alania Vladikavkaz |
| 20 | DF | Basel Abdoulfattakh | 6 March 1990 (aged 20) | 0 | 0 | (Russian Football Union) Zenit Saint Petersburg |
| 21 | DF | Viktor Vasin | 6 October 1988 (aged 21) | 1 | 0 | (Russian Football Union) Spartak Nalchik |
| 22 | MF | Aleksey Pomerko | 3 May 1990 (aged 20) | 1 | 0 | (Russian Football Union) Amkar Perm |
| 23 | GK | Sergei Panov | 13 July 1989 (aged 20) | 0 | 0 | (Russian Football Union) Dynamo Moscow |
