= 2009 Toulon Tournament squads =

Below are the rosters for the 2009 Toulon Tournament.

== Group A ==
=== Argentina ===
Head coach: Sergio Batista

No.	Pos.	Player	Date of birth (age)	Caps	Goals	Club
1	GK	Agustín Marchesín	March 16, 1988 (age 21)	0	0	(Argentine Football Association) Lanús
2	DF	Germán Pezzella	June 27, 1991 (Age 17)	0	0	(Argentine Football Association) River Plate
3	DF	Lucas Kruspzky	April 6, 1992 (Age 17)	0	0	(Argentine Football Association) Independiente
4	DF	Leandro Marín	January 22, 1992 (Age 17)	0	0	(Argentine Football Association) Boca Juniors
5	MF	Éver Banega	June 29, 1988 (Age 20)	14	0	(Royal Spanish Football Federation) Atlético Madrid
6	MF	Hugo Nervo	June 6, 1991 (Age 18)	0	0	(Argentine Football Association) Arsenal
7	FW	Franco Jara	July 15, 1988 (Age 20)	0	0	(Argentine Football Association) Arsenal
8	MF	Santiago Gallucci	March 8, 1991 (Age 18)	0	0	(Argentine Football Association) River Plate
9	MF	Diego Buonanotte	April 19, 1988 (Age 21)	5	0	(Argentine Football Association) River Plate
10	MF	Alejandro Gómez	February 15, 1988 (Age 21)	0	0	(Argentine Football Association) San Lorenzo
11	FW	Diego Perotti	July 26, 1988 (Age 20)	0	0	(Royal Spanish Football Federation) Sevilla
12	GK	Esteban Andrada	January 26, 1991 (Age 18)	0	0	(Argentine Football Association) Lanús
13	DF	Esteban Espíndola	March 22, 1992 (Age 17)	0	0	(Argentine Football Association) River Plate
14	DF	Leandro González Pírez	February 26, 1992 (Age 17)	0	0	(Argentine Football Association) River Plate
15	MF	Mauro Díaz	March 10, 1991 (Age 18)	0	0	(Argentine Football Association) River Plate
16	MF	Héctor Emiliano Cardozo	January 15, 1991 (Age 18)	0	0	(Argentine Football Association) Estudiantes
17	MF	Lucas Trecarichi	February 12, 1991 (Age 18)	0	0	(Royal Spanish Football Federation) Sevilla
18	FW	Germán Pacheco	May 19, 1991 (Age 18)	0	0	(Royal Spanish Football Federation) Atlético
19	DF	David Achucarro	January 5, 1991 (Age 18)	0	0	(Argentine Football Association) Boca Juniors
20	MF	Gerardo Bruna	January 21, 1991 (Age 18)	0	0	(The Football Association) Liverpool

=== Egypt ===
Head coach: Miroslav Soukup

No.	Pos.	Player	Date of birth (age)	Caps	Goals	Club
1	GK	Mohamed Abou Gabal	January 29, 1989 (age 20)	0	0	(Egyptian Football Association) ENPPI
2	MF	Hamada Lamloum	July 1, 1991 (Age 17)	0	0	(Egyptian Football Association) Al-Mokawloon
3	DF	Sayed Hassan	January 11, 1989 (Age 20)	0	0	(Egyptian Football Association) ENPPI
4	DF	Saad Samir	April 1, 1989 (Age 20)	0	0	(Egyptian Football Association) Nasr Lybie
5	DF	Moaz El-Henawy	January 29, 1990 (Age 20)	0	0	(Egyptian Football Association) Al-Ahly
6	DF	Ahmed Hegazy	January 25, 1991 (Age 18)	0	0	(Egyptian Football Association) Ismaily
7	DF	Mohamed Ahmed	January 1, 1989 (Age 20)	0	0	(Egyptian Football Association) ENPPI
8	MF	Mohamed Ibrahim	January 20, 1990 (Age 19)	0	0	(Egyptian Football Association) El-Mehalla
9	MF	Mohamed Talaat	March 14, 1989 (Age 20)	0	0	(Egyptian Football Association) Al-Ahly
10	MF	Ahmed Shoukry	July 21, 1989 (Age 18)	0	0	(Egyptian Football Association) Al-Ahly
11	MF	Mostafa Afroto	March 17, 1989 (Age 20)	0	0	(Egyptian Football Association) Smoha
12	DF	Islam Ramadan	November 1, 1990 (Age 18)	0	0	(Egyptian Football Association) El Hodood
13	DF	Ayman Ashraf	April 9, 1991 (Age 18)	0	0	(Egyptian Football Association) Al-Ahly
14	MF	Marzouk Salah	January 1, 1990 (Age 19)	0	0	(Egyptian Football Association) El-Mehalla
15	FW	Yasin Allam	May 14, 1990 (Age 19)	0	0	(Austrian Football Association) Austria Wien
16	GK	Ali Lotfi	October 14, 1989 (Age 19)	0	0	(Egyptian Football Association) ENPPI
17	MF	Mahmoud Tobah	October 1, 1989 (Age 19)	0	0	(Egyptian Football Association) Al-Ahly
18	MF	Ahmed Magdi	December 9, 1989 (Age 19)	0	0	(Egyptian Football Association) El-Mehalla
19	MF	Ahmed Bakr	September 16, 1989 (Age 19)	0	0	(Egyptian Football Association) Tanta
20	MF	Hossam Arafat	January 18, 1990 (Age 19)	0	0	(Egyptian Football Association) El Zamalek

=== Netherlands ===
Head coach: Hans Schrijver

No.	Pos.	Player	Date of birth (age)	Caps	Goals	Club
1	GK	Erwin Mulder	March 3, 1989 (age 20)	0	0	(Royal Dutch Football Association) Excelsior
2	DF	Tom Hiariej	September 25, 1988 (Age 20)	1	0	(Royal Dutch Football Association) Groningen
3	DF	Rens van Eijden	March 3, 1988(Age 21)	0	0	(Royal Dutch Football Association) Willem II
4	DF	Vito Wormgoor	November 16, 1988 (Age 20)	0	0	(Royal Dutch Football Association) Utrecht
5	DF	Erik Pieters	August 7, 1988 (Age 20)	11	0	(Royal Dutch Football Association) PSV
6	MF	Geert Arend Roorda	March 2, 1988 (Age 21)	1	0	(Royal Dutch Football Association) Heerenveen
7	MF	Jeffrey Sarpong	August 3, 1988 (Age 20)	0	0	(Royal Dutch Football Association) Ajax
8	MF	Erik Falkenburg	May 5, 1988 (Age 21)	0	0	(Royal Dutch Football Association) Sparta
9	FW	Ricky van Wolfswinkel	January 27, 1989 (Age 20)	0	0	(Royal Dutch Football Association) Vitesse
10	FW	Diego Biseswar	March 8, 1988 (Age 21)	0	0	(Royal Dutch Football Association) Feyenoord
11	MF	Alexander Büttner	February 11, 1989 (Age 20)	0	0	(Royal Dutch Football Association) Vitesse
12	DF	Daryl Janmaat	July 22, 1989 (Age 19)	0	0	(Royal Dutch Football Association) Heerenveen
13	MF	Olivier ter Horst	April 6, 1989 (Age 20)	0	0	(Royal Dutch Football Association) PSV
14	MF	Kai van Hese	June 15, 1989 (Age 19)	0	0	(Royal Dutch Football Association) ADO Den Haag
15	MF	Donny Gorter	June 15, 1988 (Age 20)	0	0	(Royal Dutch Football Association) NAC Breda
16	GK	Mustafa Amezrine	January 11, 1989 (age 20)	0	0	(Royal Dutch Football Association) De Graafschap
17	FW	Xander Houtkoop	March 26, 1989 (Age 19)	0	0	(Royal Dutch Football Association) Heerenveen
18	MF	Donovan Deekman	June 23, 1988 (Age 21)	0	0	(Royal Dutch Football Association) Heerenveen
19	FW	Bas Dost	May 31, 1989 (Age 20)	0	0	(Royal Dutch Football Association) Heracles
20	FW	Oussama Assaidi	August 15, 1988 (Age 20)	0	0	(Royal Dutch Football Association) De Graafschap

=== United Arab Emirates ===
Head coach: Mahdi Ali Hassan Redha GK Mohammed Saif Youssuf Al Ahli United Arab Emirates FW Ali Ahmed Al Hajeri Al Jazira United Arab Emirates DF Saad Surour Baniyas Al Ahli United Arab Emirates DF Fahad Sebil Ibrahim Obaid Al Nasr United Arab Emirates MF Adnan Ali Shanbih Al Nasr United Arab Emirates MF Habib Al Fardan Al Wasl F.C. United Arab Emirates DF Mohamed Fawzi Abdalla Al Ahli United Arab Emirates MF Ahmed Ali Khamis Al Arbi Al Wahda United Arab Emirates FW Theyeb Awana Baniyas Sports United Arab Emirates FW Salem Saleh Al Rejaibi United Arab Emirates DF Abdelaziz Mohammed Sanqour Al Ahli United Arab Emirates FW Mohammed Al Alawi Fayez Al Ain United Arab Emirates DF Abdulaziz Hussain Al Balooshi Al Shabab United Arab Emirates GK Yousif Abdelrahman Albairaq Ittihad Kalba United Arab Emirates FW Ahmed Al Junaibi Khalil Shabbab Al Ahli Club United Arab Emirates MF Maher Ghuloom Jassim Al Wasl F.C. United Arab Emirates MF Sultan Saleh Bargash Al Menhali Al Jazira United Arab Emirates DF Hamdan Ismaeel Al Kamali Al Wahda United Arab Emirates MF Omar Al-Amoodi Abdulrahman Al Ain United Arab Emirates DF Mohammed Ahmed Juma Gharib Al Shabab United Arab Emirates

== Group B ==
=== Chile ===
Head coach: Ivo Basay

No.	Pos.	Player	Date of birth (age)	Caps	Goals	Club
1	GK	Cristopher Toselli	June 15, 1988 (age 20)	0	0	(Football Federation of Chile) Universidad Católica
2	DF	Paulo Magalhaes	December 14, 1989 (Age 19)	0	0	(Football Federation of Chile) Cobreloa
3	DF	Carlos Labrín	December 2, 1990 (Age 18)	0	0	(Football Federation of Chile) Huachipato
4	DF	Nélson Saavedra	April 6, 1988 (Age 21)	0	0	(Brazilian Football Confederation) Vitória
5	DF	Bastián Arce	August 17, 1989 (Age 19)	0	0	(Football Federation of Chile) Rangers
6	DF	Juan Abarca	December 7, 1988 (Age 20)	0	0	(Football Federation of Chile) Huachipato
7	FW	Eduardo Vargas	November 20, 1989 (Age 19)	0	0	(Football Federation of Chile) Cobreloa
8	MF	Luis Pavez	June 25, 1988 (Age 20)	0	0	(Football Federation of Chile) Palestino
9	FW	Mauricio Gómez	March 5, 1989 (Age 20)	0	0	(Football Federation of Chile) Universidad de Chile
10	MF	Cristóbal Jorquera	August 4, 1988 (Age 20)	0	0	(Football Federation of Chile) O'Higgins
11	FW	Gerson Martínez	January 10, 1989 (Age 20)	0	4	(Football Federation of Chile) San Luis
12	GK	Raúl Olivares	April 17, 1988 (age 21)	0	0	(Football Federation of Chile) Colo-Colo
13	DF	Agustín Parra	June 10, 1989 (Age 19)	0	0	(Football Federation of Chile) Santiago Wanderers
14	MF	Marco Medel	June 6, 1989 (Age 19)	0	0	(Football Federation of Chile) Audax Italiano
15	MF	José Barrera	February 9, 1988 (Age 21)	0	0	(Football Federation of Chile) Santiago Morning
16	DF	Eugenio Mena	July 18, 1988 (age 20)	0	0	(Football Federation of Chile) Santiago Wanderers
17	MF	Rafael Caroca	July 18, 1989 (Age 19)	0	0	(Football Federation of Chile) Colo-Colo
18	FW	David Llanos	July 27, 1989 (Age 19)	0	0	(Football Federation of Chile) Huachipato
19	FW	Michael Silva	March 12, 1988 (Age 21)	0	0	(Football Federation of Chile) Cobreloa

=== France ===
Head coach: Erick Mombaerts

No.	Pos.	Player	Date of birth (age)	Caps	Goals	Club
1	GK	Johny Placide	January 29, 1988 (age 21)	1	0	(French Football Federation) Le Havre
2	DF	Garry Bocaly	April 19, 1988 (Age 21)	5	0	(French Football Federation) Montpellier
3	DF	Quentin Othon	March 27, 1988 (age 21)	0	0	(French Football Federation) Strasbourg
4	DF	Dorian Dervite	January 25, 1988 (Age 21)	2	0	(The Football Association) Southend United
5	DF	Mamadou Sakho	February 13, 1990 (Age 19)	3	0	(French Football Federation) Paris Saint-Germain
6	MF	Étienne Capoue	July 11, 1988 (Age 20)	3	0	(French Football Federation) Toulouse
7	FW	Gabriel Obertan	February 26, 1989 (Age 20)	3	1	(French Football Federation) Lorient
8	MF	Moussa Sissoko	August 16, 1989 (Age 19)	7	1	(French Football Federation) Toulouse
9	FW	David Ngog	April 1, 1989 (Age 20)	4	1	(The Football Association) Liverpool
10	MF	Younousse Sankharé	September 10, 1989 (Age 19)	2	1	(French Football Federation) Reims
11	FW	Bakary Sako	April 26, 1988 (Age 21)	1	0	(French Football Federation) Châteauroux
12	DF	Jean-Armel Kana-Biyik	July 3, 1989 (Age 19)	1	1	(French Football Federation) Le Havre
13	DF	Cheikh M'Bengue	July 23, 1988 (Age 20)	4	0	(French Football Federation) Toulouse
14	MF	Hérold Goulon	June 12, 1988 (Age 20)	0	0	(French Football Federation) Le Mans
15	MF	Damien Marcq	December 8, 1988 (Age 20)	0	0	(French Football Federation) Boulogne
16	GK	Kévin Olimpa	March 10, 1988 (age 21)	0	0	(French Football Federation) Bordeaux
17	MF	Marvin Martin	January 10, 1988 (Age 21)	4	0	(French Football Federation) Sochaux
18	MF	Grégory Sertic	August 5, 1989 (Age 19)	0	0	(French Football Federation) Bordeaux
19	FW	Sambou Yatabaré	March 2, 1989 (Age 20)	0	0	(French Football Federation) Caen
20	FW	Jirès Kembo Ekoko	January 8, 1988 (Age 21)	3	2	(French Football Federation) Rennes
21	DF	Paul Baysse	May 18, 1988 (Age 21)	4	0	(French Football Federation) Sedan

=== Portugal ===
Head coach: Rui Caçador

No.	Pos.	Player	Date of birth (age)	Caps	Goals	Club
1	GK	Rui Patrício	February 15, 1988 (age 21)	3	0	(Portuguese Football Federation) Sporting CP
2	DF	Rúben Lima	August 3, 1988 (Age 20)	0	0	(Portuguese Football Federation) Aves
3	DF	André Pinto	October 5, 1989 (age 19)	0	0	(Portuguese Football Federation) Santa Clara
4	DF	Bernardo Tengarrinha	February 17, 1989 (Age 20)	0	0	(Portuguese Football Federation) Estrela da Amadora
5	DF	Miguel Vítor	June 20, 1989 (Age 19)	1	0	(Portuguese Football Federation) Benfica
6	MF	Adrien Silva	March 15, 1989 (Age 20)	3	0	(Portuguese Football Federation) Sporting CP
7	MF	Daniel Candeias	February 25, 1988 (Age 21)	2	0	(Portuguese Football Federation) Rio Ave
8	MF	André Castro	April 2, 1988 (Age 21)	0	0	(Portuguese Football Federation) Olhanense
9	FW	Rabiola	July 25, 1989 (Age 19)	0	0	(Portuguese Football Federation) Porto
10	MF	Rui Pedro	July 2, 1988 (Age 20)	1	0	(Portuguese Football Federation) Estrela Amadora
11	MF	Bruno Pereirinha	March 2, 1988 (Age 21)	8	0	(Portuguese Football Federation) Sporting CP
12	GK	Hugo Ventura	January 14, 1988 (age 21)	0	0	(Portuguese Football Federation) Porto
13	DF	Bura	December 17, 1988 (Age 20)	0	0	(Portuguese Football Federation) Covilhã
14	FW	Yazalde	September 21, 1988 (Age 20)	0	0	(Portuguese Football Federation) Rio Ave
15	MF	Stanislas Oliveira	March 27, 1988 (Age 21)	0	0	(French Football Federation) Sedan
16	MF	Fábio Coentrão	March 11, 1988 (Age 21)	2	0	(Portuguese Football Federation) Rio Ave
17	FW	Ukra	March 16, 1988 (Age 21)	0	0	(Portuguese Football Federation) Olhanense
18	MF	Paulo Regula	March 12, 1989 (Age 20)	0	0	(Portuguese Football Federation) Vitória de Setúbal
19	DF	Igor Pita	May 31, 1989 (Age 20)	0	0	(Portuguese Football Federation) Nacional
20	MF	João Aurélio	August 17, 1988 (Age 20)	0	0	(Portuguese Football Federation) Nacional

=== Qatar ===
Head coach: Jean-Dominique Paternoga

No.	Pos.	Player	Date of birth (age)	Caps	Goals	Club
1	GK	Ghaith Jumah	November 2, 1988 (age 20)	0	0	(Qatar Football Association) Al-Khor
2	MF	Hamad Aldosari	March 8, 1990 (Age 19)	0	0	(Qatar Football Association) Al-Wakrah
3	DF	Khalid Fareed	January 7, 1988 (age 21)	0	0	(Qatar Football Association) Al-Arabi
4	DF	Isam Dad	September 3, 1990 (Age 18)	0	0	(Qatar Football Association) Al-Khor
5	DF	Johar Alkaabi	June 9, 1988 (Age 21)	0	0	(Qatar Football Association) Al-Arabi
6	DF	Dheyyab Alinabi	June 20, 1990 (Age 18)	0	0	(Qatar Football Association) Al-Sadd
7	MF	Khaled Abdulraaof	November 14, 1990 (Age 18)	0	0	(Qatar Football Association) Al-Sadd
8	MF	Fadhl Omar	November 15, 1989 (Age 19)	0	0	(Qatar Football Association) Qatar
9	FW	Abdulrahman Tariq	February 17, 1989 (Age 20)	0	0	(Qatar Football Association) Al-Rayyan
10	MF	Saoud Salim	October 29, 1989 (Age 19)	0	0	(Qatar Football Association) Al-Rayyan
11	MF	Mahdy Redha	May 10, 1990 (Age 19)	0	0	(Qatar Football Association) Al-Khor
12	GK	Ahmed Sofyan	August 9, 1990 (Age 18)	0	0	(Qatar Football Association) Umm-Salal
13	FW	Mohamed Mudather	April 13, 1988 (age 21)	0	0	(Qatar Football Association) Al-Wakrah
14	DF	Abdelaziz Hatem	January 1, 1990 (Age 19)	0	0	(Qatar Football Association) Al-Arabi
15	FW	Abdulghafoor Abdulla	March 12, 1989 (Age 20)	0	0	(Qatar Football Association) Al-Rayyan
16	MF	Abdulla Mustafa	March 6, 1988 (Age 21)	0	0	(Qatar Football Association) Al-Ahli
17	DF	Hamood Alyazidi	May 28, 1989 (Age 20)	0	0	(Qatar Football Association) Al-Sadd
18	FW	Saoud Khames	January 5, 1990 (Age 19)	0	0	(Qatar Football Association) Al-Rayyan
19	DF	Naser Nabeel	February 11, 1990 (Age 19)	0	0	(Qatar Football Association) Al-Sadd
20	MF	Masheel Meqbel	August 7, 1989 (Age 19)	0	0	(Qatar Football Association) Al-Sadd
