= 2010 Toulon Tournament =

Toulon Youth Festival

Tournament details
- Host country: France
- Dates: 18–27 May
- Teams: 8 (from 4 confederations)
- Venues: 6 (in 6 host cities)

Final positions
- Champions: Ivory Coast (1st title)
- Runners-up: Denmark

Tournament statistics
- Matches played: 16
- Goals scored: 58 (3.63 per match)
- Top scorer: (Denmark) Nicki Bille Nielsen (5 goals)

The 2010 Toulon Tournament was the 38th edition of the Toulon Tournament and began on 18 May and ended on 27 May 2010. Chile were the defending champions.

== Participant teams ==
- France
- Colombia
- Ivory Coast
- Japan
- Chile
- Qatar
- Russia
- Denmark

== Venues ==
The matches were played in these communes:

- Aubagne
- Hyères
- La Seyne
- Le Lavandou
- Nice
- Toulon

== Results ==
=== Group A ===
Team	Pld	W	D	L	GF	GA	GD	Pts	Qualification
France	3	3	0	0	8	2	+6	9	Advance to Semi-final
Ivory Coast	3	2	0	1	6	2	+4	6	Advance to Semi-final
Colombia	3	1	0	2	3	4	−1	3	
Japan	3	0	0	3	1	10	−9	0	

Source: Toulon Tournament

All times local (CEST)

18 May 2010
18:30 CEST

Ivory Coast	3–0	Japan
Boli 2'; Déblé 26' (pen.); Sagbo 65'	Report

Stade du Ray, Nice
Referee: Thomas Vejlgaard (Denmark)

18 May 2010
20:45 CEST

France	2–0	Colombia
Schneiderlin 33'; Kitambala 44'	Report

Stade du Ray, Nice
Referee: Maksim Layushkin (Russia)

20 May 2010
18:00 CEST

Colombia	0–2	Ivory Coast
	Report	Goua Gohou 62', 66'

Stade Perruc, Hyères
Referee: Khamis Al-Mari (Qatar)

20 May 2010
20:00 CEST

France	4–1	Japan
Bourgeois 6'; Gueye 33' (pen.); Butin 70'; Brahimi 72'	Report	Suganuma 17'

Stade Perruc, Hyères
Referee: Jorge Osorio Reyes (Chile)

22 May 2010
19:00 CEST

Japan	0–3	Colombia
	Report	Calle 13'; Cardona 33'; Muriel 35'

Le Grand Stade, Le Lavandou
Referee: Thomas Vejlgaard (Denmark)

22 May 2010
19:00 CEST

Ivory Coast	1–2	France
Saré 54'	Report	Nestor 46'; Dossevi 60'

Stade de Lattre, Aubagne
Referee: Jorge Osorio Reyes (Chile)

=== Group B ===
Team	Pld	W	D	L	GF	GA	GD	Pts	Qualification
Chile	3	2	1	0	10	3	+7	7	Advance to Semi-final
Denmark	3	2	1	0	7	3	+4	7	Advance to Semi-final
Qatar	3	0	1	2	5	9	−4	1	
Russia	3	0	1	2	3	10	−7	1	

Source: Toulon Tournament

All times local (CEST)

19 May 2010
18:30 CEST

Chile	4–2	Qatar
Muñoz 12'; Abarca 14'; Toro 45'; Medel 67'	Report	Al Haidos 32'; Afif 55'

Stade Marquet, La Seyne
Referee: Ryuji Sato (Japan)

19 May 2010
20:45 CEST

Denmark	3–1	Russia
Bjelland 6'; Lyng 11'; Bille 56'	Report	Mamayev 36' (pen.)

Stade Marquet, La Seyne
Referee: Wimar Roldan Perez (Colombia)

21 May 2010
17:45 CEST

Denmark	3–1	Qatar
Dalsgaard 4'; Bille 49'; Lyng 72'	Report	Al Haidos 8'

Stade Mayol, Toulon
Referee: Monetchet Leonard Nahi (Ivory Coast)

21 May 2010
20:00 CEST

Russia	0–5	Chile
	Report	Rubio 37'; Pavez 46'; Medel 55'; Martínez 67'; Ubilla 77'

Stade Mayol, Toulon
Referee: Abdel Ismail (Jordan)

23 May 2010
19:00 CEST

Chile	1–1	Denmark
Mena 49'	Report	Jessen 48'

Le Grand Stade, Le Lavandou
Referee: Ryuji Sato (Japan)

23 May 2010
19:00 CEST

Qatar	2–2	Russia
Al Haidos 18'; Vlasov 70' (o.g.)	Report	Smolov 3'; Sapeta 52'

Stade de Lattre, Aubagne
Referee: Wilmar Roldan Perez (Colombia)

== Knockout stage ==
=== Semifinals ===
25 May 2010
18:30 CEST

Chile	0–2	Ivory Coast
	Report	Sagbo 65'; Déblé 90+3'

Stade Mayol, Toulon
Referee: Maksim Layushkin (Russia)

25 May 2010
21:00 CEST

France	2–3	Denmark
Butin 29'; Kitambala 68'	Report	Koné 24' (o.g.); Bille 48', 73'

Stade Mayol, Toulon
Referee: Abdel Ismail (Jordan)

=== Third place play-off ===
27 May 2010
18:30 CEST

Chile	1–2	France
Muñoz 53'	Report	Kitambala 12', 80'

Stade Mayol, Toulon
Referee: Khamis Al-Marri (Qatar)

=== Final ===
27 May 2010
21:00 CEST

Ivory Coast	3–2	Denmark
Ouedraogo 19'; Goua Gohou 39'; Sio 74'	Report	Bille 46'; Mortensen 80'

Stade Mayol, Toulon
Referee: Jorge Osorio Reyes (Chile)

== Goal scorers ==
5 goals

- (Denmark) Nicki Bille Nielsen

4 goals

- (France) Lynel Kitambala

3 goals

- (Ivory Coast) Gerard Bi Goua Gohou
- (Qatar) Hassan Al Haidos

2 goals

- (France) Edouard Butin
- (Chile) Marco Medel
- (Chile) Carlos Muñoz
- (Denmark) Emil Lyng
- (Ivory Coast) Serge Déblé
- (Ivory Coast) Yannick Sagbo

1 goal

- (France) Thibaut Bourgeois
- (France) Yacine Brahimi
- (France) Mathieu Dossevi
- (France) Magaye Gueye
- (France) Loïc Nestor
- (France) Morgan Schneiderlin
- (Chile) Juan Abarca
- (Chile) Gerson Martínez
- (Chile) Eugenio Mena
- (Chile) Luis Pavez
- (Chile) Matías Rubio
- (Chile) Sebastián Toro
- (Chile) Sebastián Ubilla
- (Colombia) Javier Calle
- (Colombia) Edwin Cardona
- (Colombia) Luis Muriel
- (Denmark) Andreas Bjelland
- (Denmark) Henrik Dalsgaard
- (Denmark) Mads Jessen
- (Denmark) Patrick Mortensen
- (Ivory Coast) Yannick Boli
- (Ivory Coast) Moustapha Ouedraogo
- (Ivory Coast) Bakary Saré
- (Ivory Coast) Giovanni Sio
- (Japan) Shunya Suganuma
- (Qatar) Ali Yahya
- (Russia) Pavel Mamayev
- (Russia) Alexander Sapeta
- (Russia) Fedor Smolov

Own goal

- (France) Lamine Koné (for Denmark)
- (Russia) Anton Vlasov (for Qatar)
