= Felipe Gutiérrez =

Chilean footballer (born 1990)

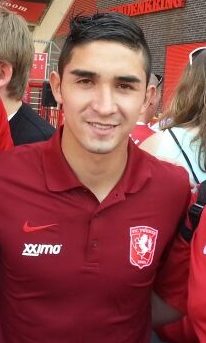
- Gutiérrez with Twente in 2013

Personal information
- Full name: Felipe Alejandro Gutiérrez Leiva
- Date of birth: 8 October 1990 (age 36)
- Place of birth: Quintero, Chile
- Height: 1.71 m (5 ft 7 in)
- Position: Midfielder

Team information
- Current team: Deportes La Serena (manager)

Youth career
- 2004–2007: Everton
- 2008–2009: Universidad Católica

Senior career*
| Years | Team | Apps | (Gls) |
| 2009–2012 | Universidad Católica | 65 | (19) |
| 2012–2016 | Twente | 94 | (9) |
| 2015–2016 | Twente II | 1 | (0) |
| 2016–2018 | Betis | 14 | (1) |
| 2017 | → Internacional (loan) | 16 | (1) |
| 2018–2020 | Sporting Kansas City | 52 | (19) |
| 2021–2022 | Universidad Católica | 37 | (6) |
| 2022 | → Colorado Rapids (loan) | 12 | (0) |
| 2023 | Al Wasl | 10 | (1) |
| 2023 | Sporting Kansas City | 8 | (0) |
| 2024 | Quintero Unido | – | (–) |
| 2024 | Universidad de Concepción | 3 | (0) |
| Total | | 312 | (56) |

International career
| 2010–2017 | Chile | 35 | (4) |

Managerial career
- 2025: Sport Boys (assistant)
- 2025: Deportes La Serena (assistant)
- 2025: Concón National (assistant)
- 2025: Quintero Unido
- 2025: Sport Boys (assistant)
- 2026–: Deportes La Serena
Medal record
Representing Chile
| Winner | Copa América | 2015 |
| Runner-up | FIFA Confederations Cup | 2017 |
- * Club domestic league appearances and goals

Felipe Alejandro Gutiérrez Leiva (Spanish pronunciation: [feˈlipe ɣuˈtjeres]; born 8 October 1990) is a Chilean former footballer who played as a midfielder. He is the current manager of Deportes La Serena.

== Club career ==
=== Universidad Católica ===
Gutiérrez began his youth career at Everton de Viña del Mar in 2004. Four years later, after being scouted, he moved to Universidad Católica. He made his professional debut on 7 November 2009 at only 18 years of age, in a 4–1 win over Universidad de Concepción.

In the 2010 season, Gutiérrez marked his first goal for the club in Copa Chile in a 4–0 win against San Pedro de Atacama and scored his first league goal for the club, in a 4–1 win over O'Higgins on 31 July 2010. Gutiérrez then scored his second goal for the club in the last game of the season, in a 5–0 win over Everton. Later in the 2010 season, Gutiérrez won the Chilean championship with Universidad Católica and went to score two times in fifteen appearances.

In the Torneo Apertura, Gutiérrez started well in the tournament and made an impressive display, including scoring important goals against Colo-Colo twice in four encounters on 26 May 2011 and 16 October 2011. and Universidad de Chile on 15 May 2011. Later in the 2011 season, Gutiérrez scored ten goals in thirty–eight appearances in all competitions and he became runners-up in the championship with Universidad Católica, losing 4–1 in the final against Universidad de Chile, and won the Chilean Cup. He was also voted "revelation of the season" by readers of the Chilean edition of the El Gráfico magazine. His performance attracted interests from La Liga side Málaga, where he could link up his compatriot Manager Manuel Pellegrini. However, Gutiérrez dismissed the move to Málaga.

In the 2012 Apertura, he became the club's top scorer with seven goals, including scoring two braces against Cobreloa and Cobresal.

=== FC Twente ===
In June 2012, Gutiérrez signed for FC Twente of the Eredivisie who paid a fee between U.S. $3.5 and 4 million to Universidad Catolica for 70% of the transfer rights.

Gutiérrez made his professional debut for the club on 2 August 2012 in the third qualifying round of the Europa League against FK Mladá Boleslav, being substituted on in the 73rd minute. A week later on 14 August 2012, Gutiérrez made his league debut for the club, in the opening game of the season, coming on as a substitute in the 84th minute, in a 4–1 win over Groningen. He scored his first goal for Twente on 30 August 2012 in a Europa League play-off match against Bursaspor in a 4–1 win, helping the Dutch team qualify for the group stage. On 15 September 2012, Gutiérrez scored his first Twente goal, in a 6–2 win over Willem II. During a match against Hannover 96 in the Europa League, Gutiérrez suffered a knee injury and after the match, it was announced that he would be out for two months. After making his return from injury against Feyenoord on 27 January 2013, Gutiérrez scored his second league goal for the club on 28 April 2013, in a 5–2 win over NEC. Gutiérrez then scored two times against Groningen in both legs of the plays–off, which Twente won 4–3 on aggregate. Despite this, Gutiérrez finished his first season at Twente, making forty–three appearances and scoring six times in all competitions.

In the 2013–14 season, Gutiérrez began to establish himself in the first team and then scored his first goal for the club on 14 December 2013, in a 3–1 win over Go Ahead Eagles. Gutiérrez then scored two goals in two matches on 2 April 2014 and 5 April 2014 against ADO Den Haag and NAC Breda. For his performance against NAC Breda, Gutiérrez was named Team of the Week by Algemeen Dagblad. Gutiérrez appeared in thirty–three matches and scoring three times in the 2013–14 season, but missed one game, due to squad rotation. Gutiérrez's performance was a standout that Algemeen Dagblad named him as a favourite to win the Most Valuable Player of the Eredivisie. Eventually, Gutiérrez went to win the award.

However, in the 2014–15 season, Gutiérrez missed most of the season following the conclusion of the World Cup with a knee injury. The knee injury kept him sidelined until January and the club received compensation from the FIFA Club Protection Programme. While on the sidelines, Gutiérrez had an operation in Spain and found himself in a difficult situation following the death of his friend and his grandfather. By March, Gutiérrez made his return to training for the time in nine months and made his first appearance on 4 April 2015, coming on as a substitute for Kyle Ebecilio, in a 5–0 loss against PSV Eindhoven. Since making his return to the first team, Gutiérrez went on to make five appearances for the club.

Ahead of the 2015–16 season, Twente faced a major uncertainty when they faced consequences of financial problems and faced cuts along the way. Despite this, Gutiérrez, once again, became a first team regular following his return from injury. Gutiérrez then scored his first goal of the season, in a 2–2 draw against Ajax on 12 September 2015. Following Hakim Ziyech's departure to Ajax in the January transfer window, Gutiérrez was appointed as the new club captain and appeared as a captain in the first match on 15 January 2016, where he set up one of the goals, in a 4–0 win over Heracles Almelo. Gutiérrez scored his second goal of the season on 31 January 2016, in a 3–1 win over Utrecht. However, as the season progressed, Gutiérrez missed four matches between 10 April 2016 and 1 May 2016, due to his wife giving birth and a knee injury, which expected him to be out for the rest of the season. However, he made his return in the last game of the season, in a 2–2 draw against Vitesse. Gutiérrez finished the 2015–16 season, making twenty–nine appearances and scoring two times.

=== Real Betis ===
In May 2016, Spanish newspaper El Desmarque claimed that newly promoted La Liga side Real Betis interested signing Gutiérrez. Despite a knee injury setback, the medical went ahead and it was announced on 6 July 2016, Gutiérrez signed a four-year deal with Real Betis.

Gutiérrez made his Real Betis debut, playing 55 minutes before being substituted, in a 6–2 loss against Barcelona in the opening game of the season. At the start of the 2016–17 season, he quickly established himself in the first team, playing in the midfield position. He then scored his first goal for the club, in a 2–1 win over Osasuna on 21 October 2016. However, by December, Gutiérrez was soon dropped by the squad by new Manager Víctor Sánchez. This was followed up a month later by suffering a knee injury in training. After returning to training in February, he made his return from injury, coming on as a late substitute, in a 2–1 loss against rivals' Sevilla on 25 February 2017. He made another appearance for the side in a follow-up match and played 45 minutes before being substituted at half–time, in a 2–1 win over Málaga on 28 February 2017. Following this, Gutiérrez was dropped from the squad and never played for Real Betis again this season. In his first season at Real Betis, Gutiérrez made 16 appearances and scoring once in all competitions.

On 30 January 2018, Gutiérrez agreed the termination of his contract with Betis.

=== Internacional (loan) ===
On 1 April 2017, Gutiérrez was loaned to Internacional for the 2017 season. It came after when he was expecting to be loaned out to a Brazilian club, which turns out to be Internacional. The move also included an option to buy 2 million euros (about R $6.71 million) at the end of the season.

Gutiérrez made his Sport Club Internacional debut, in a 1–1 draw against Corinthians in the Copa do Brasil, but was eliminated from the tournament after losing 4–3 on penalty shootout. Then, on 13 May 2017, he made his league debut for the club, where he set up a goal for Nicolás López, in a 3–0 win over Londrina. After spending two months away from the team, due to international commitment, Gutiérrez made his return to the first team on 8 July 2017, in a 1–1 draw against Criciúma. It was not until on 8 September 2017 when he scored his first goal, in a 2–1 loss against Juventude.

However, he struggled to establish himself in the first team at Sport Club Internacional, as he spent the rest of the season on the substitute bench, and went on to make 16 appearances and scoring once for the side. At the end of 2017 season, the club decided against taking up option to buy Gutiérrez.

=== Sporting Kansas City ===
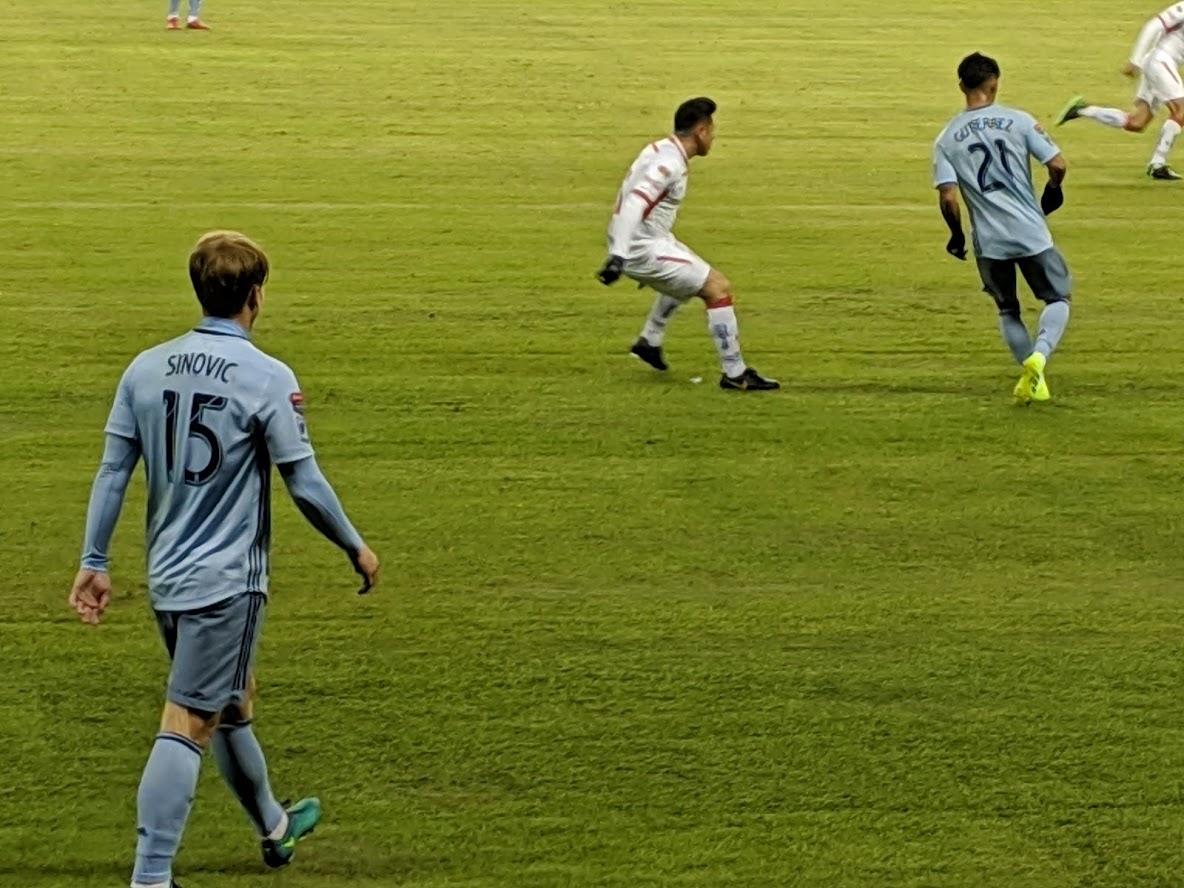
Gutierrez in the background against Deportivo Toluca F.C. in CONCACAF Champions League

After being released by Real Betis, it was announced on 6 February 2018 that Gutiérrez signed with Sporting Kansas City in Major League Soccer as a Designated Player and signing a three-year contract through 2020 with an option for 2021.

Gutiérrez made his Sporting Kansas City debut, where he started the whole game, in a 2–0 loss against New York City in the opening game of the season. Gutiérrez scored his first goals in a follow-up match, in a 4–3 win over Chicago Fire. He then scored three goals in the next three match against San Jose Earthquakes, Colorado Rapids and D.C. United. For his performance, he was named March's MLS Player of the Month. However, he spent the next three months on the sidelines, due to separate injuries. He then returned to the first team from injury on 15 July 2018, coming on as a substitute for Yohan Croizet in the 78th minute, in a 3–2 loss against New York Red Bulls.

=== Colorado Rapids (loan) ===
In August 2022, he was loaned to Colorado Rapids in the MLS on a deal until December.

=== Al Wasl ===
After ending his contract with Universidad Católica, Gutiérrez moved to the United Arab Emirates and joined Al Wasl.

=== Sporting Kansas City ===
On 6 July 2023 Gutiérrez re-joined Sporting Kansas City through 2023 with a club option for 2024. Gutiérrez announced his retirement on 24 January 2024.

=== Return to play ===
Following to announce his retirement, Gutiérrez signed with Quintero Unido on 27 January 2024. However, he only joined the local team, not the squad in the Tercera B, according to the President of the club, Carlos Rajano.

On 13 March 2024, he joined Universidad de Concepción. After making three appearances, he announced his definitive retirement on 13 May 2024.

== International career ==
Due to his impressive display at Universidad Católica, Gutiérrez made his Chile debut on 30 May 2010, where he came on as a late substitute, in a 1–0 win over Northern Ireland. Gutiérrez then scored his first Chile goal after coming on as a substitute in the 75th minute, in a 2–1 loss against Argentina on 17 October 2012.

Gutiérrez was included in three major tournament for Chile: he was called up into the squad for the Copa América and appeared four times on the substitute bench. Prior to his successful call–up in the FIFA World Cup in Brazil, Gutiérrez suffered a knee injury in training that required examination and putting his World Cup place in doubt. It turns out that Gutiérrez was given an all-clear, regarding to his injury and expected to be in the World Cup squad for Chile. Gutiérrez made his first World Cup appearance against Australia, where he came on as a substitute for Arturo Vidal in the 60th minute, in a 3–1 win on 13 June 2014. Gutiérrez then made his first World Cup start in the final game of the group–stage, in a 2–0 loss against Netherlands. Gutiérrez played four times in the World Cup, as Chile progressed through the group stage, but was eliminated by Brazil in the round of 16.

Despite missing out most of the 2014–15 season with a knee injury, Gutiérrez was included in the Chile squad for the Copa América. Up until then, Gutiérrez was on the substitute bench in the first four matches of the tournament and appeared once in the semi–final of the Copa América when he came on as a substitute for Jorge Valdivia in the 86th minute, in a 1–0 win over Peru on 30 June 2015. Despite this, Chile went on to win their first Copa América.

Two months after the conclusion of the Copa América, Gutiérrez scored his first Chile goals in two years, in a 3–2 win over Paraguay on 5 September 2015. However, because of his knee injury, Gutiérrez was left out of the squad for the Copa América Centenario, but Chile went on to win the Copa América Centenario. He made his return on 2 September 2016, where he came on as a substitute for Francisco Silva in the 73rd minute, in a 2–1 loss against Paraguay. Gutiérrez was called up by the national side for the FIFA Confederations Cup but did not play a single game throughout the tournament, as Chile finished runner up after losing to Germany in the final.

== Coaching career ==
In December 2024, Gutiérrez graduated as a football manager at INAF (National Institute of Football, Sports and Physical Activity of Chile). In January 2025, he joined the technical staff of Cristian Paulucci in Peruvian club Sport Boys and next Deportes La Serena.

On 26 August 2025, Gutiérrez was appointed as the manager of Quintero Unido in the Chilean Tercera A. After returning to Sport Boys as assistant of Jaime de la Pava in December 2025, he returned to Chile few days later and assumed as manager of Deportes La Serena in the Liga de Primera.

== Personal life ==
Born in Quintero, Chile, Gutiérrez grew up with six–half sisters, which three of them came from his father side and the three other came from his mother side. Because of Pinochet, his father fled to live in Netherlands, and two of his half–sisters from his father side continued to live there. Gutiérrez has an older brother, Orlando Gutiérrez, who is also a footballer. However, unlike Felipe, Orlando have so far spent most of his career, playing for clubs in Chile. He is also the uncle of the Dutch golfer Nicolás Blaha Gutierrez, who was with the Feyenoord youth ranks.

Gutiérrez speaks Spanish and upon moving to Twente, he began learning Dutch, having stated he had been taking Dutch lessons twice a week. Gutiérrez also has a wife, Carla, and a son, Matias. In April 2016, Gutiérrez became a father for a second time when his wife gave birth to another son, Gael.

Gutiérrez has a school named after him in the city of Lautaro.

== Career statistics ==
=== Club ===
As of 30 June 2022

| Club | Season | League | | | National cup | | Continental | | Other | | Total | |
| Club | Season | Division | Apps | Goals | Apps | Goals | Apps | Goals | Apps | Goals | Apps | Goals |
|---|---|---|---|---|---|---|---|---|---|---|---|---|
| Universidad Católica | 2009 | C. Primera División | 2 | 0 | — | | — | | — | | 2 | 0 |
| Universidad Católica | 2010 | C. Primera División | 15 | 2 | 1 | 1 | — | | — | | 16 | 3 |
| Universidad Católica | 2011 | C. Primera División | 31 | 10 | 4 | 0 | 13 | 0 | — | | 48 | 10 |
| Universidad Católica | 2012 | C. Primera División | 17 | 7 | — | | 6 | 2 | — | | 23 | 9 |
| Universidad Católica | Total club | | 65 | 19 | 5 | 1 | 19 | 2 | 0 | 0 | 89 | 22 |
| FC Twente | 2012-13 | Eredivisie | 27 | 4 | 2 | 0 | 9 | 1 | — | | 38 | 5 |
| FC Twente | 2013-14 | Eredivisie | 33 | 3 | 1 | 0 | — | | — | | 34 | 3 |
| FC Twente | 2014-15 | Eredivisie | 5 | 0 | 1 | 0 | — | | — | | 6 | 0 |
| FC Twente | 2015-16 | Eredivisie | 29 | 2 | 1 | 0 | — | | — | | 30 | 2 |
| FC Twente | Total club | | 94 | 9 | 5 | 0 | 9 | 1 | 0 | 0 | 108 | 10 |
| Twente II (loan) | 2014-15 | Eerste Divisie | 1 | 0 | — | | — | | — | | 1 | 0 |
| Real Betis | 2016-17 | La Liga | 14 | 1 | 2 | 0 | — | | — | | 16 | 1 |
| SC Internacional (loan) | 2017 | Brasileiro Série B | 16 | 1 | 4 | 0 | — | | — | | 20 | 1 |
| Kansas City | 2018 | Major League Soccer | 24 | 7 | 1 | 0 | — | | — | | 25 | 7 |
| Kansas City | 2019 | Major League Soccer | 32 | 12 | 1 | 0 | 5 | 0 | — | | 38 | 12 |
| Kansas City | Total club | | 56 | 19 | 2 | 0 | 5 | 0 | 0 | 0 | 63 | 19 |
| Universidad Católica | 2021 | C. Primera División | 21 | 3 | 4 | 0 | 6 (Note: Appearance(s) in the Copa Libertadores) | 0 | — | | 31 | 3 |
| Universidad Católica | 2022 | C. Primera División | 14 | 3 | 2 | 0 | 6 (Note: 5 appearances in Copa Libertadores, 1 in Copa Sudamericana) | 0 | 1 (Note: Appearances in the Supercopa de Chile) | 0 | 23 | 3 |
| Universidad Católica | Total club | | 35 | 6 | 6 | 0 | 12 | 0 | 1 | 0 | 54 | 6 |
| Career total | | | 281 | 55 | 24 | 1 | 45 | 3 | 1 | 0 | 351 | 59 |

=== International ===
As of 5 October 2017.

Appearances and goals by national team and year
| National team | Year | Apps | Goals |
|---|---|---|---|
| Chile | 2010 | 2 | 0 |
| Chile | 2011 | 3 | 0 |
| Chile | 2012 | 5 | 1 |
| Chile | 2013 | 5 | 0 |
| Chile | 2014 | 7 | 0 |
| Chile | 2015 | 4 | 2 |
| Chile | 2016 | 6 | 1 |
| Chile | 2017 | 3 | 0 |
| Total | | 35 | 4 |

=== International goals ===
Scores and results list Chile's goal tally first.

| No | Date | Venue | Opponent | Score | Result | Competition |
|---|---|---|---|---|---|---|
| 1. | 16 October 2012 | Estadio Nacional Julio Martínez Prádanos, Santiago, Chile | Argentina | 1–2 | 1–2 | 2014 FIFA World Cup qualification |
| 2. | 5 September 2015 | Estadio Nacional Julio Martínez Prádanos, Santiago, Chile | Paraguay | 1–0 | 3–2 | Friendly |
| 3. | 5 September 2015 | Estadio Nacional Julio Martínez Prádanos, Santiago, Chile | Paraguay | 2–2 | 3–2 | Friendly |
| 4. | 24 March 2016 | Estadio Nacional Julio Martínez Prádanos, Santiago, Chile | Argentina | 1–0 | 1–2 | 2018 FIFA World Cup qualification |

== Honours ==
Universidad Católica

- Primera División de Chile: 2010, 2021
- Copa Chile: 2011
- Supercopa de Chile: 2020, 2021

Chile

- Copa América: 2015
