= Matías Leiva =

Chilean footballer (born 1999)

Personal information
- Full name: Matías Armando Leiva Arancibia
- Date of birth: 24 July 1999 (age 27)
- Place of birth: Viña del Mar, Chile
- Position: Forward

Team information
- Current team: Quintero Unido
- Number: 11

Youth career
- Everton

Senior career*
Years	Team	Apps	(Gls)
2017–2021	Everton	38	(3)
2020	→ San Luis (loan)	1	(1)
2022	San Marcos	8	(0)
2023	Fernández Vial	24	(3)
2024	Concón National	21	(0)
2025	Deportivo Chillepín	–	(–)
2026–	Quintero Unido	26	(30)

International career
2018	Chile U20		
Medal record
Men's football
Representing Chile
South American Games
Gold medal – first place	2018 Cochabamba
- * Club domestic league appearances and goals as of 28 October 2026

Matías Armando Leiva Arancibia (born 24 July 1999) is a Chilean footballer who plays as a forward for Quintero Unido.

== Club career ==
In 2024, Leiva played for Concón National in the Segunda División Profesional de Chile. The next year, he joined amateur club Deportivo Chillepín from Salamanca.

In 2026, Leiva joined Quintero Unido in the Tercera A and won the league title as the top goalscorer with 30 goals.

== International career ==
At under-20 level, Leiva represented Chile in the 2018 South American Games, winning the gold medal.

== Honours ==
San Marcos

- Segunda División Profesional: 2022

Quintero Unido

- Tercera A: 2026

Chile U20

- South American Games Gold medal: 2018

Individual

- Tercera A Top goalscorer: 2026
