= Agustín Parra =

Chilean footballer (born 1989)

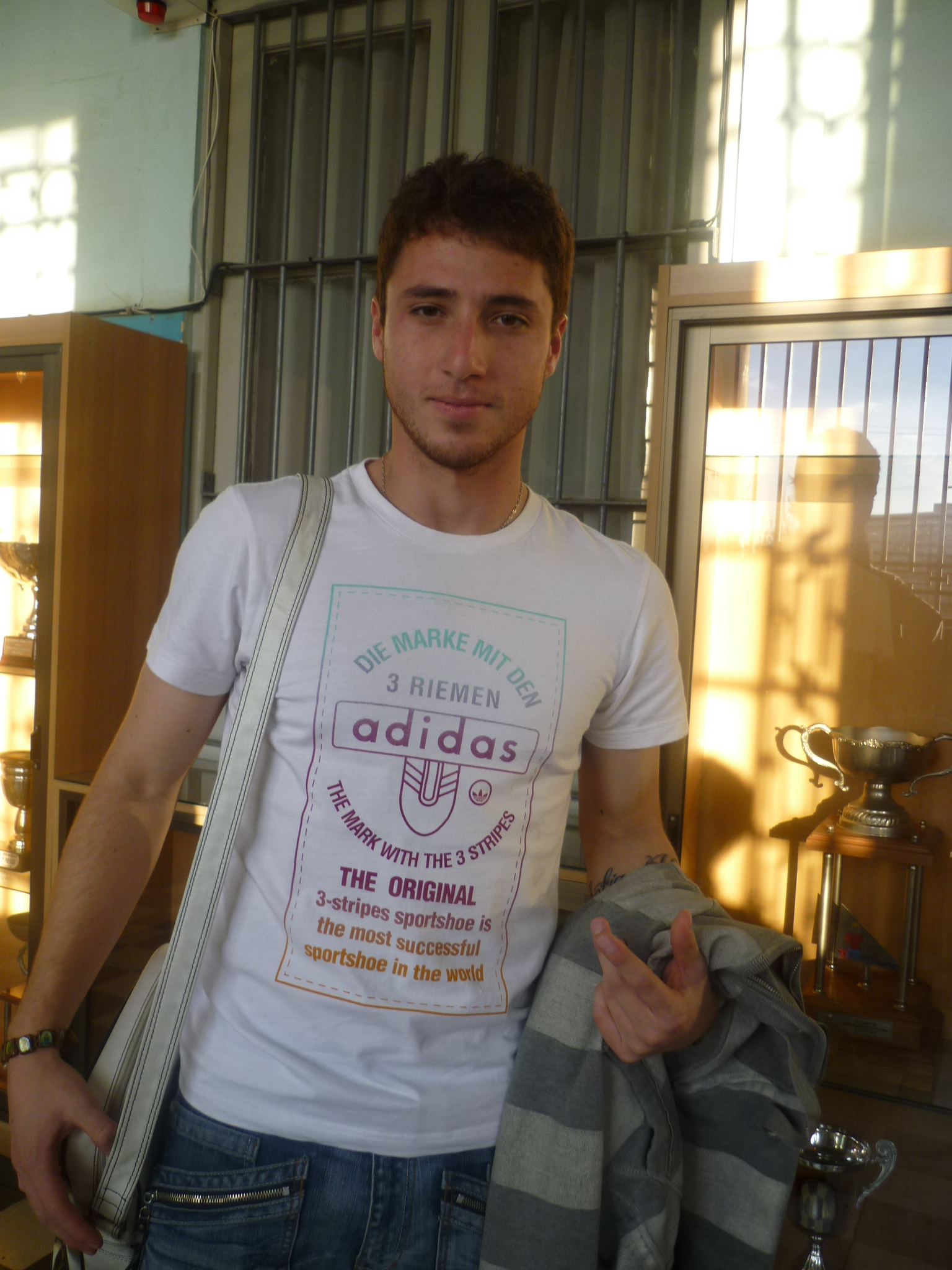
- Parra in 2010

Personal information
- Full name: Agustín Hernán Felipe Parra Repetto
- Date of birth: 6 October 1989 (age 37)
- Place of birth: Viña del Mar, Chile
- Height: 1.76 m (5 ft 9 1/2 in)
- Position: Defender

Youth career
- Santiago Wanderers

Senior career*
Years	Team	Apps	(Gls)
2010–2018	Santiago Wanderers	177	(4)
Total		177	(4)

International career
2008	Chile U23	1	(0)
2009	Chile U21	3	(0)
2010	Chile U22	2	(0)
2012–2013	Chile		

Managerial career
- 2022–2023: Santiago Wanderers (youth)
- 2024: Concón National
- * Club domestic league appearances and goals

Agustín Hernán Felipe Parra Repetto (born June 10, 1989) is a Chilean football manager and former player who played as a defender.

== International career ==
He represented Chile U23 at the 2008 Inter Continental Cup in Malaysia. After, he represented Chile U21 and Chile U22 at the Toulon Tournament in 2009 and 2010, respectively. Chile won the 2009 edition.

At senior level, Parra represented the Chile national team in the 4–6 loss against the Uruguay Olympic team on 11 July 2012. He also was a substitute in the friendly match against Haiti on January 19, 2013.

== Coaching career ==
Following his retirement, Parra graduated as a football mamager and began his career at the Santiago Wanderers youth ranks. In January 2024, he assumed as the manager of Concón National in the Segunda División Profesional de Chile.

== Honours ==
=== Player ===
Santiago Wanderers

- Copa Chile (1): 2017

Chile U21

- Toulon Tournament (1): 2009
