= Kevin Harbottle =

Chilean footballer (born 1990)

Personal information
- Full name: Kevin Andrew Harbottle Carrasco
- Date of birth: 8 June 1990 (age 36)
- Place of birth: Antofagasta, Chile
- Height: 1.65 m (5 ft 5 in)
- Position: Second striker

Team information
- Current team: Deportes Santa Cruz

Youth career
- 2004–2008: Deportes Antofagasta

Senior career*
Years	Team	Apps	(Gls)
2008	Deportes Antofagasta	21	(6)
2009–2012	Argentinos Juniors	10	(2)
2009–2010	→ O'Higgins (loan)	22	(6)
2010–2011	→ Unión Española (loan)	25	(9)
2011–2012	→ Universidad Católica (loan)	32	(4)
2013	Colorado Rapids	4	(0)
2013	Colorado Rapids 2	4	(3)
2013–2014	Deportes Antofagasta	24	(2)
2014	Unión San Felipe	0	(0)
2014–2015	San Marcos	36	(8)
2015–2016	Unión Española	25	(4)
2016–2017	Deportes Antofagasta	25	(3)
2017–2019	Deportes Temuco	26	(1)
2018–2019	→ Tampico Madero (loan)	21	(1)
2020–2022	Fernández Vial	79	(25)
2023	Cobreloa	28	(4)
2024	Curicó Unido	28	(1)
2025–	Deportes Santa Cruz	0	(0)

International career
2008–2010	Chile U20	16	(8)
2010	Chile U22	3	(0)
2010	Chile	1	(0)
- * Club domestic league appearances and goals as of 12 January 2025

Kevin Andrew Harbottle Carrasco (born 8 June 1990) is a Chilean footballer who currently plays for Deportes Santa Cruz in the Primera B de Chile.

== Club career ==
Harbottle was raised in Iquique, with his mother and stepfather. It is in this city where he started playing futsal. Was later discovered by a football teacher who took him to play for Racing of Taltal, where he had early success. At 14, he reached the lower divisions of Deportes Antofagasta and from the under 15 squad moved up in the youth system.

Harbottle made his professional debut on 6 June 2008, wearing the shirt of Deportes Antofagasta, a club which trained him as a player. In this match, Antofagasta defeated Rangers by a 2–1 score. His first goal as a professional was against Cobreloa, after only 21 days of his debut. Later, and with few only having played a few matches, he dazzled the leaders of Argentinos Juniors, who purchased his pass from Antofagasta and he was tested on the reserve team. In Argentina he remained only one semester before joining O'Higgins on loan, who was managed at that time by Jorge Sampaoli, where he did not have much continuity.

With the arrival of Roberto Hernandez as new manager of the "celestes", Harbottle scored six goals in the Chilean Apertura 2010. In June 2010, he prompted the interest of directors from Unión Española, who signed him on loan for one year. However, despite the fact he scored in crucial matches (he scored the only goal for Unión Española in a Copa Libertadores match against Universidad Católica), he wasn't a first option at attacking midfielder for manager José Luis Sierra, reason for which the colony club didn't opt for purchasing his contract.

In June 2011, he signed for Universidad Católica for a year and a half deal. During his time with Católica Harbottle helped the club in capturing the 2011 Copa Chile.

On 17 January 2013, he signed with the Colorado Rapids of Major League Soccer. Harbottle was released on 31 July after playing fewer than 300 minutes.

In 2024, Harbottle joined Curicó Unido from Cobreloa. The next year, he switched to Deportes Santa Cruz.

== National team ==
In 2008, Harbottle was selected for the first time for the Chilean under-20 team, managed by Ivo Basay, where he scored a goal against Bolivia U20. Nevertheless, Basay decided not to include him in the final roster for the South American U-20 Championship in 2009. Later, in 2010 he was selected again for the U-22 team, now managed by César Vacchia to participate in the 2010 Toulon Tournament.

In the same year, he made his debut for Chile's senior team managed by Marcelo Bielsa in a friendly against Trinidad and Tobago before the FIFA World Cup 2010.

== Career statistics ==
As of match played on 16 March 2018

Appearances and goals by club, season and competition
Club	Season	League			Cup		League Cup		Other		Total	
Club	Season	Division	Apps	Goals	Apps	Goals	Apps	Goals	Apps	Goals	Apps	Goals
Antofagasta	2008	Primera División of Chile	14	2	0	0	—				14	2
O'Higgins (loan)	2009	Primera División of Chile	9	0	0	0	—				9	0
O'Higgins (loan)	2010	Primera División of Chile	13	6	0	0	—				13	6
O'Higgins (loan)	Total		22	6	0	0	0	0	0	0	22	6
Unión Española (loan)	2010	Primera Division of Chile	9	5	1	0	—				10	5
Unión Española (loan)	2011	Primera Division of Chile	16	4	0	0	—		7	1	23	5
Unión Española (loan)	Total		25	9	1	0	0	0	7	1	33	10
Universidad Católica (loan)	2011	Primera División of Chile	15	3	3	1	—		1	0	19	4
Universidad Católica (loan)	2012	Primera División of Chile	17	1	3	2	—		4	0	24	3
Universidad Católica (loan)	Total		32	4	6	3	0	0	5	0	43	7
Colorado Rapids	2013	Major League Soccer	4	0	1	0	—				5	0
Colorado Rapids B	2013	USL Pro	4	3	—						4	3
Antofagasta	2013–14	Primera División of Chile	24	2	0	0	—				24	2
Unión San Felipe	2014–15	Primera B de Chile	?	?	5	3	—				5	3
San Marcos	2014–15	Primera División of Chile	36	8	4	1	—				40	9
Unión Española	2015–16	Primera División of Chile	25	4	10	2	—				35	6
Antofagasta	2016–17	Chilean Primera División	25	3	1	0	—				26	3
Deportes Temuco	2017	Chilean Primera División	14	0	3	0	—				17	0
Deportes Temuco	2018	Chilean Primera División	3	1	0	0	—				3	1
Deportes Temuco	Total		17	1	0	0	0	0	0	0	17	1
Career totals			228	42	31	9	0	0	12	1	271	52

== Honours ==
=== Club ===
- Universidad Católica
  - Copa Chile: 2011
