= Gabriel Rojas =

Gabriel Rojas may refer to:

- Gabriel Rojas (footballer, born 1997), Argentine defender for Cruzeiro
- Gabriel Rojas (footballer, born 1999), Chilean forward for Santiago Wanderers
