= Luis Pavez =

Luis Pavez may refer to:

- Luis Pavez (footballer, born 1988), Chilean midfielder, playing for Ñublense
- Luis Pavez (footballer, born 1995), Chilean footballer, currently playing for Colo-Colo
