= Raúl Olivares =

Chilean footballer (born 1988)

Personal information
- Full name: Raúl Alejandro Olivares Gálvez
- Date of birth: 17 April 1988 (age 38)
- Place of birth: Santiago, Chile
- Height: 1.85 m (6 ft 1 in)
- Position: Goalkeeper

Team information
- Current team: Santiago Wanderers

Youth career
- 2001–2006: Colo-Colo

Senior career*
Years	Team	Apps	(Gls)
2006–2014	Colo-Colo	14	(0)
2007	→ Santiago Morning (loan)	23	(0)
2008	→ Unión San Felipe (loan)	13	(0)
2012	→ Deportes La Serena (loan)	9	(0)
2013–2014	→ Unión Española (loan)	5	(0)
2013	→ Unión Española B (loan)	4	(0)
2015	Estudiantes BA	0	(0)
2015	Universitario de Sucre	9	(0)
2015–2017	Jorge Wilstermann	63	(1)
2018	Cobreloa	24	(0)
2019	Always Ready	40	(0)
2020–2021	Deportes La Serena	2	(0)
2022–2024	Universitario de Vinto	63	(1)
2025	Monagas	10	(0)
2025–	Santiago Wanderers	10	(0)

International career^{‡}
2009	Chile U21	1	(0)
2011	Chile U25	1	(0)
- * Club domestic league appearances and goals as of 30 July 2025 ‡ National team caps and goals as of 7 September 2011

Raúl Alejandro Olivares Gálvez (born 17 April 1988) is a Chilean footballer who plays as a goalkeeper for the Santiago Wanderers.

== Club career ==
After ending his contract with Colo-Colo, on 2015 he signed with Estudiantes de Buenos Aires, but he didn't make his debut and canceled the contract to join Bolivian club Universitario de Sucre.

On May 5, 2017, he scored the first goal of his professional career, a penalty kick against Sport Boys.

In 2025, Olivares moved to Venezuela and joined Monagas from Bolivian club Universitario de Vinto.

Back to Chile, Olivares joined Santiago Wanderers in the Liga de Ascenso on 30 July 2025.

== International career ==
He was called up to the Chile U21 squad for the 2009 Toulon Tournament, playing the match against France U21 at the group stage. Chile became champion of the tournament. In addition, he was part of the Chile squad for both 2008 Toulon Tournament (U23) and 2010 Toulon Tournament (U22), but he didn't make any appearance.

On September 7, 2011, he represented Chile in a match against Mexico U22 played in Curicó, Chile. The squad only included under-25 players and was a draw by 2–2.

== Honours ==
Colo-Colo

- Chilean Primera División (2): 2006 Clausura, 2009 Clausura

Santiago Morning

- Primera B Promotion Playoffs (1): 2007

Unión Española

- Chilean Primera División (1): 2013 Transición
- Supercopa de Chile (1): 2013

Jorge Wilstermann

- Bolivian Primera División (1): 2015–16 Clausura

Chile U21

- Toulon Tournament (1): 2009
