= Michael Silva =

Chilean footballer (born 1988)

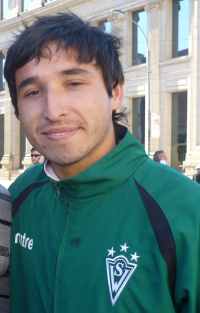
- Silva with Santiago Wanderers in 2010

Personal information
- Full name: Michael Andrés Silva Torres
- Date of birth: 12 March 1988 (age 38)
- Place of birth: Valparaíso, Chile
- Height: 1.65 m (5 ft 5 in)
- Position: Forward

Youth career
- Unión Placilla
- Santiago Wanderers

Senior career*
Years	Team	Apps	(Gls)
2004–2007	Santiago Wanderers	42	(6)
2007–2009	Atlante	0	(0)
2007	→ León (loan)	4	(0)
2008	→ Provincial Osorno (loan)	10	(1)
2008	→ Potros Chetumal (loan)	14	(0)
2009	→ Cobreloa (loan)	33	(6)
2010–2012	Santiago Wanderers	75	(7)
2013–2014	Deportes Antofagasta	32	(5)
2014–2016	Unión La Calera	44	(3)
2016–2017	San Marcos	39	(15)
2018	Ñublense	30	(7)
2019	Deportes La Serena	15	(5)
2020–2021	Rangers	14	(1)
2021	Deportes Iquique	15	(2)
2022	Deportes Melipilla	25	(1)
2023	San Antonio Unido	12	(1)

International career
2007	Chile U20	2	(0)
2009	Chile U21	1	(0)
- * Club domestic league appearances and goals

Michael Andrés Silva Torres (born 12 March 1988) is a Chilean former professional footballer who played as a forward.

== Club career ==
As a child Silva was with Unión Placilla, the club of his neighborhood in Valparaíso. A product of Santiago Wanderers youth system, in 2007 he signed with Mexican side Atlante, being loaned to León, Provincial Osorno, Potros Chetumal and Cobreloa.

Back in Chile, he returned to Santiago Wanderers and next he has played for several clubs, mainly at the Primera B.

His last club was San Antonio Unido in the 2023 Segunda División Profesional de Chile.

== International career ==
Silva represented Chile at under-20 level in the 2007 FIFA World Cup, where he made two appearances. In addition, he represented Chile in the 2009 Toulon Tournament, where Chile was the champion.

== Honours ==
Chile U20

- FIFA U-20 World Cup third place: 2007

Chile U21

- Toulon Tournament: 2009
