= Orlando Gutiérrez (Chilean footballer) =

Chilean footballer (born 1989)

Personal information
- Full name: Orlando Salvador Gutiérrez Leiva
- Date of birth: 19 August 1989 (age 37)
- Place of birth: Quintero, Chile
- Height: 1.78 m (5 ft 10 in)
- Position: Left-back

Team information
- Current team: Concón National

Youth career
- AGC Provincial

Senior career*
Years	Team	Apps	(Gls)
–2009	AGC Provincial	–	(–)
2010	Coquimbo Unido	0	(0)
2010	Trasandino	27	(2)
2010–2012	Barnechea	25	(1)
2013–2014	Everton	31	(1)
2014–2015	Ñublense	18	(0)
2015–2017	Deportes Temuco	45	(3)
2018–2019	Deportes Puerto Montt	35	(2)
Total		181	(9)

Managerial career
- 2019: Quintero Unido (caretaker)
- 2019–2021: Deportes Puerto Montt (youth)
- 2021: Deportes Puerto Montt (women)
- 2022: Quintero Unido (assistant)
- 2022: Quintero Unido
- 2024–: Concón National (assistant)
- 2024–2025: Concón National (caretaker)
- 2025–: Concón National
- * Club domestic league appearances and goals

Orlando Salvador Gutiérrez Leiva (born 19 August 1989) is a Chilean former professional football player and current manager who played as a defender. He is the current manager of Concón National.

== Personal life ==
He is the older brother of the Chilean international footballer Felipe Gutiérrez.

== Managerial career ==
While still he was a player of Deportes Puerto Montt, he graduated as a Football Manager at the INAF (Football National Institute of Chile) and ran a training workshop for youth female football players in July 2019.

On 2021, Gutiérrez became manager of Deportes Puerto Montt (women).

In 2022, he assumed as the assistant coach, and later as the head coach, in Quintero Unido.
