= Alexis Delgado =

Chilean footballer (born 1987)

Personal information
- Full name: Alexis Nicolás Delgado Navarrete
- Date of birth: 31 December 1987 (age 38)
- Place of birth: Talcahuano, Chile
- Height: 1.73 m (5 ft 8 in)
- Position: Midfielder

Youth career
- 1994–2006: Huachipato
- 2006: → Villarreal (loan)

Senior career*
Years	Team	Apps	(Gls)
2007–2009	Huachipato	12	(0)
2009–2010	Iberia	–	(–)
2011	Deportes Copiapó	33	(6)
2012	Magallanes	28	(1)
2013–2017	Audax Italiano	10	(1)
2013–2014	Audax Italiano B	28	(11)
2015–2016	→ Deportes Concepción (loan)	12	(1)
2017–2018	Iberia	12	(0)
Total		135	(20)
- * Club domestic league appearances and goals

Alexis Nicolás Delgado Navarrete (born 31 December 1987) is a Chilean former footballer who played as a midfielder.

== Career ==
A product of Huachipato, he had a stint with Villarreal in Spain alongside his fellow footballer Juan Abarca in 2006.

In his homeland, he also played for Iberia, Deportes Copiapó, Magallanes, Audax Italiano and Deportes Concepción.

== Personal life ==
Both his father and his brother of the same name, Patricio, were footballers who played for Huachipato. In addition, he is the nephew of Sandro Navarrete, a former Chile international player at under-20 level.
