= Franco Ragusa =

Chilean footballer (born 1993)

Personal information
- Full name: Franco Marcelo Ragusa Nappe
- Date of birth: 22 July 1993 (age 33)
- Place of birth: Viña del Mar, Chile
- Height: 1.84 m (6 ft 0 in)
- Position: Midfielder

Team information
- Current team: Concón National
- Number: 10

Youth career
- 2007–2009: Everton

Senior career*
Years	Team	Apps	(Gls)
2010–2019	Everton	59	(4)
2012	→ Barnechea (loan)	23	(4)
2016	→ Deportes Concepción (loan)	6	(0)
2018	→ Rangers (loan)	29	(6)
2019	Zamora CF	4	(0)
2020–2021	Cobresal	56	(3)
2022	Universidad de Concepción	31	(1)
2023–2024	Deportes Recoleta	45	(1)
2025–	Concón National	6	(1)

International career
2013	Chile U20	7	(0)
- * Club domestic league appearances and goals as of 4 May 2025

Franco Marcelo Ragusa Nappe (Latin American Spanish pronunciation: [ˈfɾaŋko maɾˈselo raˈɣusa]; born 22 July 1993) is a Chilean footballer who plays as a midfielder for Concón National.

== Personal life ==
His older brother, Stefano, is a former football forward who was a member of the Everton squad that won the 2008 Apertura of the Primera División.
