= Jimmy Cisterna =

Chilean footballer (born 1993)

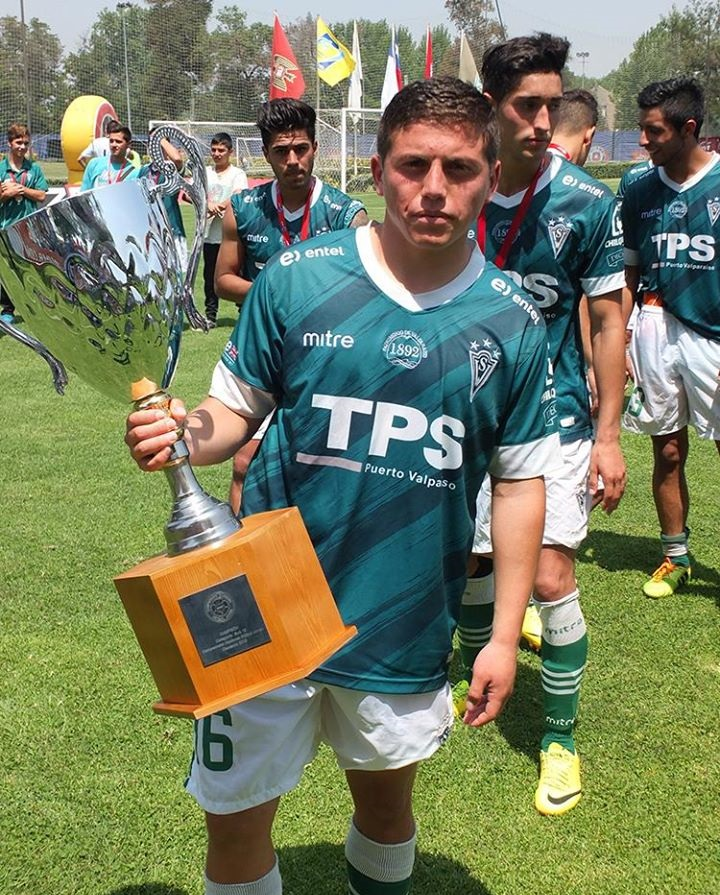
- Cisterna with Santiago Wanderers in 2014

Personal information
- Full name: Jimmy Andrés Cisterna Moya
- Date of birth: 5 April 1993 (age 33)
- Place of birth: Viña del Mar, Chile
- Height: 1.59 m (5 ft 2 1/2 in)
- Position: Midfielder

Team information
- Current team: Concón National

Youth career
- 2007–2012: Santiago Wanderers

Senior career*
Years	Team	Apps	(Gls)
2012–2017	Santiago Wanderers	35	(0)
2017	→ Unión San Felipe (loan)	7	(1)
2018–2020	Unión San Felipe	73	(10)
2021–2022	Deportes Temuco	50	(3)
2023–2024	San Marcos	28	(3)
2024	San Antonio Unido	12	(0)
2025	Deportes Recoleta	10	(0)
2026–	Concón National	0	(0)
- * Club domestic league appearances and goals as of 6 March 2026

Jimmy Andrés Cisterna Moya (born 5 April 1993) is a Chilean footballer who plays as a midfielder for Concón National in the Segunda División Profesional de Chile.

== Club career ==
He began his career at Santiago Wanderers youth set-up aged 14, joining Valparaíso-based after playing for several neighborhood clubs. In mid-2012 he was promoted to the first adult team and made his professional debut in a 1–1 away draw with O'Higgins on 21 October.

In the second half of 2024, Cisterna joined San Antonio Unido in the Segunda División Profesional de Chile.

In 2025, Cisterna played for Deportes Recoleta. The next year, he joined Concón National.
