= Joaquín Plaza =

Argentine footballer (born 2004)

Personal information
- Full name: Francisco Joaquín Plaza Molina
- Date of birth: 23 July 2004 (age 22)
- Place of birth: Maipú, Mendoza, Argentina
- Height: 1.75 m (5 ft 9 in)
- Position: Striker

Team information
- Current team: Concón National (on loan from Deportes Limache)
- Number: 7

Youth career
- Deportivo Maipú
- Independiente Rivadavia
- 2021–2023: Newell's Old Boys

Senior career*
Years	Team	Apps	(Gls)
2023–2025	Newell's Old Boys	2	(0)
2023	→ Defensores de Belgrano VR (loan)	8	(0)
2023	→ FADEP (loan)	1	(0)
2025–	Deportes Limache	6	(1)
2026–	→ Concón National (loan)	2	(1)
- * Club domestic league appearances and goals as of 8 November 2025

Francisco Joaquín Plaza Molina (born 25 July 2004), known as Joaquín Plaza, is an Argentine footballer who plays as a striker for Chilean club Concón National.

== Club career ==
Born in Maipú, Argentina, Plaza was with Deportivo Maipú and Independiente Rivadavia before joining Newell's Old Boys in January 2021. During 2023, he was loaned out to Defensores de Belgrano de Villa Ramallo and Fundación Amigos del Deportes (FADEP). Back to Newell's Old Boys, he signed his first professional contract on 8 October 2024 and made his debut with the first team in the 2–0 away loss against Central Córdoba de Santiago del Estero on 8 February 2025.

In the second half of 2025, Plaza moved to Chile and signed with Deportes Limache on a deal for two years. He scored his first goal in the 4–0 win against Audax Italiano on 11 August 2025. In March 2026, he moved to Concón National.

== Personal life ==
His father was a professional footballer for Deportivo Maipú.
