= Fadhl Omar =

Qatari footballer (born 1989)

Personal information
- Full name: Fadhl Omar Said
- Date of birth: November 18, 1989 (age 36)
- Height: 1.75 m (5 ft 9 in)
- Position: Midfielder

Senior career*
Years	Team	Apps	(Gls)
2006–2017	Qatar	169	(20)
2017–2018	Al Ahli	10	(0)
2018–2020	Qatar	16	(0)
2019–2020	→ Umm Salal (loan)	1	(0)
2020–2021	Al-Shamal		

International career
2009–	Qatar	2	(0)
- * Club domestic league appearances and goals as of 30/12/11

Fadhl Omar is a Qatari footballer who plays as a midfielder. He has a brother, Mohammed Omar, who is also a footballer. He is a member of the Qatar national football team.
