= Igor Pita =

Portuguese footballer (born 1989)

Personal information
- Full name: Carlos Igor Silveira Pita
- Date of birth: 31 May 1989 (age 37)
- Place of birth: Camacha, Portugal
- Height: 1.82 m (6 ft 0 in)
- Position: Left-back

Youth career
- 1998–2003: Camacha
- 2003–2008: Nacional

Senior career*
Years	Team	Apps	(Gls)
2008–2010	Nacional	8	(0)
2009–2010	→ Beira-Mar (loan)	27	(1)
2010–2011	Doxa	2	(0)
2011–2013	Marítimo B	17	(0)
2011–2012	→ Belenenses (loan)	14	(0)
Total		68	(1)

International career
2007	Portugal U18	2	(0)
2007–2008	Portugal U19	9	(2)
2009	Portugal U21	5	(0)
- * Club domestic league appearances and goals

Carlos Igor Silveira Pita (born 31 May 1989 in Camacha, Madeira) is a Portuguese former footballer who played as a left-back.
