= Mohammed Omar (footballer, born 1983) =

Qatari footballer

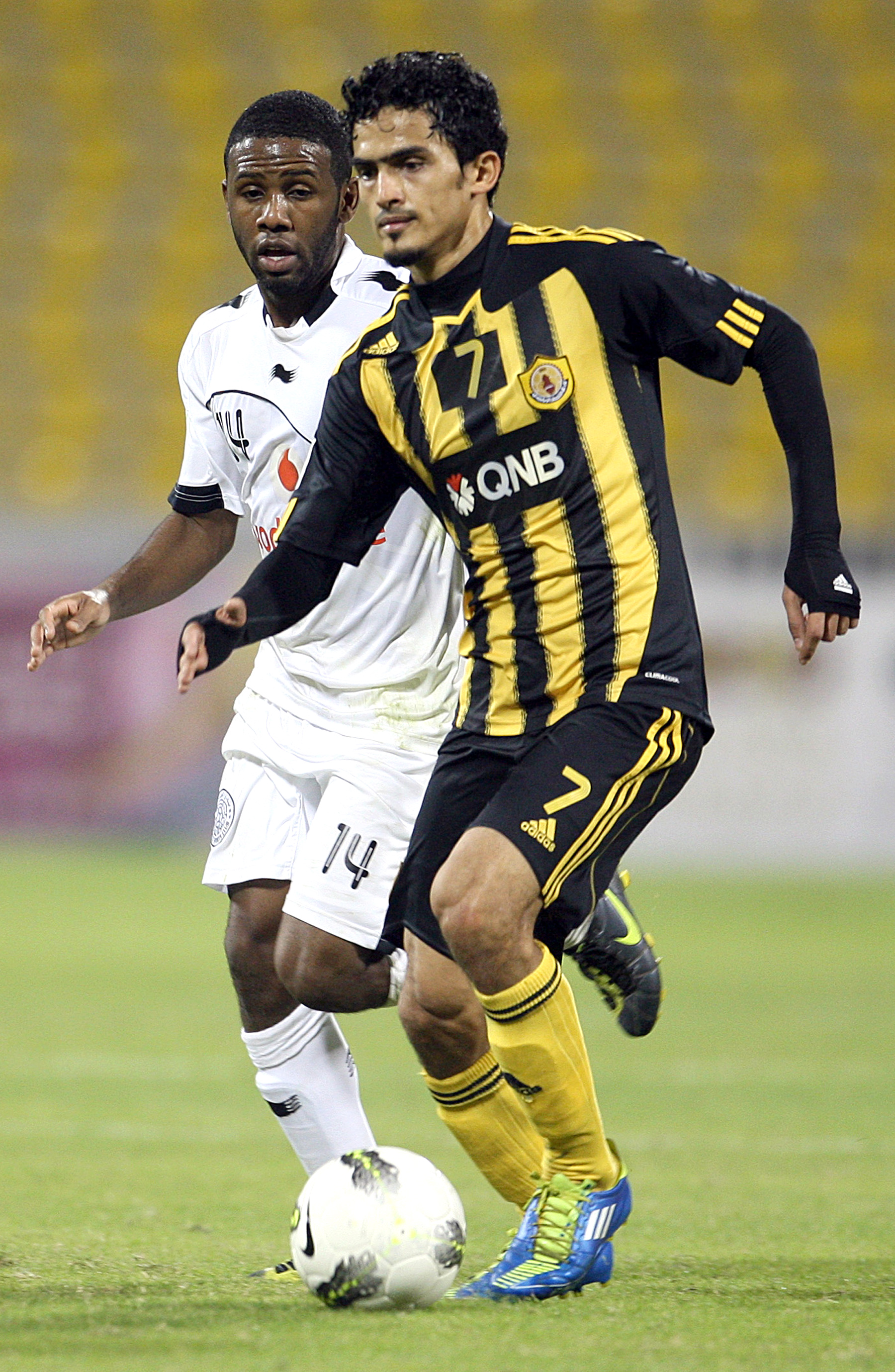
- Omar (right) playing for Qatar SC in 2011

Personal information
- Full name: Mohammed Omar Hashim Ali Saeed
- Date of birth: 27 January 1983 (age 43)
- Place of birth: Qatar
- Position: Midfielder

Senior career*
Years	Team	Apps	(Gls)
2001–2018	Qatar SC	456	(42)
2018–2019	Al-Shamal		

International career
2006–2011	Qatar	9	(0)
- * Club domestic league appearances and goals

Mohammed Omar Hashim Ali Said (Arabic: محمد عمر هاشم علي سعيد; born 27 January 1983) is a Qatari former professional footballer who played as a midfielder. He played for the Qatar national team between 2006 and 2011.
