= Maksim Shumailov =

Russian footballer

Personal information
- Full name: Maksim Alekseyevich Shumailov
- Date of birth: 2 May 1990 (age 36)
- Height: 1.88 m (6 ft 2 in)
- Position: Goalkeeper

Youth career
- SDYuSShOR Perm

Senior career*
Years	Team	Apps	(Gls)
2006–2011	FC Amkar Perm	0	(0)
2010	→ FC Tyumen (loan)	8	(0)
2011–2012	→ FC Oktan Perm (loan)	19	(0)
2012–2014	FC Oktan Perm	25	(0)
2014	FC Kaluga	1	(0)
2015	FC Okean Kerch		
2015	FC Volga-Olimpiyets Nizhny Novgorod	0	(0)
2016–2017	FC Okean Kerch		
2018	FC TSK Simferopol		
2018–2022	FC Zvezda Perm	34	(0)

International career
2008–2009	Russia U-19	7	(0)
2011	Russia U-21	1	(0)
- * Club domestic league appearances and goals

Maksim Alekseyevich Shumailov (Russian: Максим Алексеевич Шумайлов; born 2 May 1990) is a Russian former football goalkeeper.

== Career ==
Shumailov made his professional debut for Amkar on 15 July 2009 in the Russian Cup game against FC Avangard Kursk.
