= Gabriel Rojas (footballer, born 1999) =

Chilean footballer

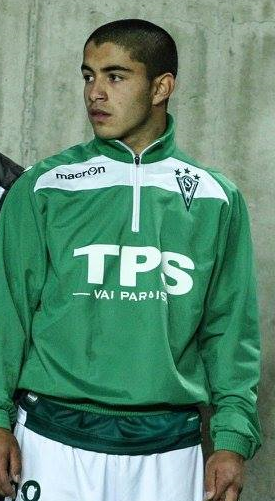
- Rojas with Santiago Wanderers in 2016

Personal information
- Full name: Gabriel Ignacio Rojas Muñoz
- Date of birth: 9 March 1999 (age 27)
- Place of birth: Puchuncaví, Chile
- Height: 1.66 m (5 ft 5 in)
- Position: Forward

Team information
- Current team: Concón National

Youth career
- 2012–2016: Santiago Wanderers

Senior career*
Years	Team	Apps	(Gls)
2016–2022	Santiago Wanderers	43	(1)
2019	→ San Marcos (loan)	7	(0)
2022	Colchagua	–	(–)
2023	Unión San Felipe	4	(1)
2023–2024	Provincial Osorno	29	(2)
2025–2026	Cobreloa	8	(0)
2026–	Concón National	0	(0)

International career
- Chile U16
2017–2018	Chile U20	5	(1)
Medal record
Men's football
Representing Chile
South American Games
Gold medal – first place	2018 Cochabamba
- * Club domestic league appearances and goals as of 21 June 2026

Gabriel Ignacio Rojas Muñoz (born 9 March 1999) is a Chilean professional footballer who plays as a forward for Segunda División Profesional de Chile club Concón National.

== Club career ==
Rojas signed for Santiago Wanderers in 2012. After five years in the youth ranks, he made his senior debut during September 2017 in a Copa Chile win versus Iberia. A month later, Rojas appeared in league football for the first time when he was selected for the second half of a fixture with Colo-Colo on 15 October. In July 2019, Rojas agreed a loan deal with Segunda División team San Marcos. Seven appearances followed as they won promotion as champions.

On second half 2022, he left Santiago Wanderers and joined Colchagua in the Segunda División Profesional de Chile.

Rojas joined Cobreloa for the 2025 season.

== International career ==
Internationally, Rojas played for Chile U16s and was also selected for U20 training in July 2017.

At under-20 level, Rojas represented Chile in the 2018 South American Games, winning the gold medal.

== Career statistics ==
As of 30 August 2020.

Club statistics
Club	Season	League			Cup		League Cup		Continental		Other		Total	
Club	Season	Division	Apps	Goals	Apps	Goals	Apps	Goals	Apps	Goals	Apps	Goals	Apps	Goals
Santiago Wanderers	2016–17	Primera División	0	0	0	0	—		—		0	0	0	0
Santiago Wanderers	2017	Primera División	1	0	1	0	—		—		0	0	2	0
Santiago Wanderers	2018	Primera B de Chile	8	0	3	0	—		0	0	0	0	11	0
Santiago Wanderers	2019	Primera B de Chile	1	0	0	0	—		—		0	0	1	0
Santiago Wanderers	2020	Primera División	0	0	0	0	—		—		0	0	0	0
Santiago Wanderers	Total		10	0	4	0	—		0	0	0	0	14	0
San Marcos (loan)	2019	Segunda División	7	0	0	0	—		—		0	0	7	0
Career total			17	0	4	0	—		0	0	0	0	21	0

== Honours ==
Santiago Wanderers

- Copa Chile: 2017

San Marcos

- Segunda División: 2019

Chile U20

- South American Games Gold medal: 2018
