= Yesinguer Jiménez =

Colombian footballer (born 1991)

Personal information
- Full name: Yesinguer Jiménez Bustamante
- Date of birth: 13 January 1991 (age 35)
- Place of birth: Medellín, Colombia
- Height: 1.89 m (6 ft 2 in)
- Position: Defensive midfielder

Youth career
- Once Caldas

Senior career*
Years	Team	Apps	(Gls)
2009–2011	Once Caldas	17	(1)
2011	UB Conquense	2	(0)
2012	Once Caldas	1	(0)
2012	Deportivo Pereira	4	(0)
2013	Jaguares de Córdoba	8	(0)
2015	Boyacá Chicó	4	(1)
2017–2018	Sanarate		
2018	Cerro Largo	2	(0)
2020	Deportivo Mictlán	0	(0)
- * Club domestic league appearances and goals

Yesinguer Jiménez (born January 13, 1991) is a Colombian football midfielder.

== Titles ==
Season	Club	Title
2009	Once Caldas	Categoría Primera A - Torneo Apertura
2010	Once Caldas	Categoría Primera A - Torneo Finalización
