= Luciano Ospina =

Colombian footballer (born 1991)

Personal information
- Full name: Luciano Alejandro Ospina Londoño
- Date of birth: February 18, 1991 (age 35)
- Place of birth: Medellín, Colombia
- Height: 1.90 m (6 ft 3 in)
- Position: Centre back

Team information
- Current team: Alianza Petrolera
- Number: 3

Youth career
- 2008–2009: Huracán

Senior career*
Years	Team	Apps	(Gls)
2009–2012	Huracán	10	(0)
2012	→ América de Cali (loan)	33	(1)
2013	→ Envigado (loan)		
2013	UT Arad	0	(0)
2014	Deportivo Rionegro	32	(2)
2015	Boyacá Chicó	4	(0)
2015–2017	Fortaleza	56	(3)
2017–	Alianza Petrolera	196	(7)
2020–2021	→ Millonarios (loan)	0	(0)

International career
2010	Colombia U20	8	(0)
- * Club domestic league appearances and goals as of 26 April 2020

Luciano Alejandro Ospina Londoño (born February 18, 1991) is a Colombian footballer who currently plays for Alianza Petrolera. He was a member of the Colombia national under-20 football team at the 2011 FIFA U-20 World Cup.
