= Juan Sebastián Villate =

Colombian footballer (born 1991)

Personal information
- Full name: Juan Sebastián Villate Lemos
- Date of birth: February 14, 1991 (age 35)
- Place of birth: Medellín, Antioquia, Colombia
- Height: 1.94 m (6 ft 4 1/2 in)
- Position: Goalkeeper

Youth career
- 2008–2011: Millonarios

Senior career*
Years	Team	Apps	(Gls)
2011–2012	Millonarios		
2012	Real Cartagena		

International career
2009–2011	Colombia U-20	0	(0)
- * Club domestic league appearances and goals as of September 28, 2012

Juan Sebastián Villate Lemos (born February 14, 1991) is a Colombian football goalkeeper.

== Club career ==
Villate is a product of the Millonarios youth system and played with the Millonarios first team since July, 2010.
