= Stanislas Oliveira =

French-born Portuguese footballer (born 1988)

Personal information
- Date of birth: 27 March 1988 (age 38)
- Place of birth: Mont-Saint-Aignan, France
- Height: 1.79 m (5 ft 10 in)
- Position: Midfielder

Youth career
- 2005–2008: Sedan

Senior career*
Years	Team	Apps	(Gls)
2008–2012	Sedan	122	(5)
2012–2013	Boulogne	36	(1)
2013–2015	Strasbourg	26	(0)
2015–2021	Quevilly-Rouen	130	(4)

International career^{‡}
2009	Portugal U21	1	(1)
- * Club domestic league appearances and goals as of 16:46, 4 December 2020 (UTC) ‡ National team caps and goals as of 6 November 2016

Stanislas Oliveira (born 27 March 1988) is a professional footballer. Born in France, his parents are from Bragança in the North Region of Portugal.

== Football career ==
Born in Mont-Saint-Aignan, Stanislas joined Sedan in 2005 and ascending the ranks until finally settling in with the club's under-18 side. After performing well, he was promoted to the senior squad for the latter part of the 2007–08 Ligue 2 season and made his debut on 28 March 2008, a day after 20th birthday, in a league match against Châteauroux starting the match and playing the full 90 minutes in a 2–1 victory. Two weeks later, he signed his first professional contract agreeing to a three-year deal. Later that same day, he started his second straight match in a 2–0 victory over Stade Brest.

For the 2008–09 season, with the club focusing more on youth, Stanislas was promoted to the senior squad permanently and giving the squad number 18. After beginning the season in the reserves, he returned to the first team in October 2008 starting in a 1–0 victory over Boulogne. Over the course of the season, he has made 23 league appearances, starting the majority of them. He was particularly instrumental in helping Sedan reach the quarter-finals of the Coupe de France, where they were eliminated by the eventual champions Guingamp. Of the five matches Sedan contested, he started four of them and appeared as a substitute in one.

== International career ==
Stanislas is eligible to represent both France and Portugal, due to being born in France and raised by parents from Portugal. In January 2009, he was called up to the France under-21 team for supervised training at Clairefontaine. During the training, he appeared in a FIFA non-sanctioned friendly against the Paris Saint-Germain Reserves. Had the match been sanctioned, he would have been tied to France, though rules limited players to only one nationality have since subsided. Following this, he announced his desire to play for Portugal and on 21 May 2009, he was called up to the Portugal under-21 team to play in the 2009 Toulon Tournament. He cited his father as his reason for choosing Portugal. In his only appearance in the competition, against Qatar, he scored a goal.
