= Mads Jessen =

Danish footballer (born 1989)

Personal information
- Full name: Mads S. Jessen
- Date of birth: 14 October 1989 (age 37)
- Place of birth: Denmark
- Height: 1.83 m (6 ft 0 in)
- Position: Attacking midfielder

Senior career*
Years	Team	Apps	(Gls)
2007–2012	SønderjyskE	60	(3)
2012–2013	Vendsyssel FF	21	(4)
2013–2017	Hobro IK	94	(8)
- * Club domestic league appearances and goals as of 13 June 2017 (UTC)

Mads S. Jessen (born 14 October 1989) is a Danish professional football attacking midfielder, who last played for Hobro IK.
