= Abdul Moustapha Ouédraogo =

Ivorian footballer

Abdul Moustapha
Personal information
- Full name: Abdul Moustapha Ouédraogo
- Date of birth: 9 June 1988 (age 38)
- Place of birth: Abidjan, Ivory Coast
- Height: 1.80 m (5 ft 11 in)
- Position: Winger

Senior career*
Years	Team	Apps	(Gls)
2006–2007	ASEC Mimosas		
2008	Stella Club d'Adjamé		
2009–2012	Trofense	33	(4)
2012–2013	Al Jazirah Al-Hamra		
2013–2014	Pogoń Szczecin II	9	(1)
2013–2014	Pogoń Szczecin	15	(0)
2014–2015	CA Bizertin	5	(0)
2015	→ AS Marsa (loan)	14	(1)
2015–2018	Stilon Gorzów Wielkopolski	18+	(4+)
- * Club domestic league appearances and goals

Abdul Moustapha Ouédraogo (born 9 June 1988) is an Ivorian former professional footballer who played as a winger.

== Career ==
Moustapha previously played for ASEC Mimosas and Stella Club d'Adjamé, before signing in January 2009 with C.D. Trofense. He played his first professional game on 8 March 2009 against Académica Coimbra in the Liga Sagres. Moustapha was transferred to Pogoń Szczecin in 2013.

== Honours ==
Stilon Gorzów Wielkopolski

- IV liga Lubusz: 2016–17
