= Juan Abarca =

Chilean footballer (born 1988)

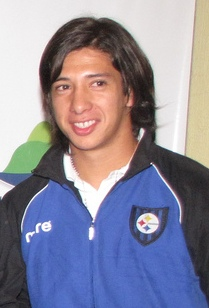
- Abarca with Huachipato in 2009

Personal information
- Full name: Juan René Abarca Fuentes
- Date of birth: December 7, 1988 (age 37)
- Place of birth: San Vicente de Tagua Tagua, Chile
- Height: 1.75 m (5 ft 9 in)
- Position: Centre-back

Team information
- Current team: General Velásquez

Youth career
- Huachipato
- 2006–2007: Villarreal C

Senior career*
Years	Team	Apps	(Gls)
2007–2009	Huachipato	57	(1)
2010–2015	Universidad de Chile	44	(2)
2012	→ Cobreloa (loan)	26	(2)
2013	→ Huachipato (loan)	4	(0)
2013–2015	→ Santiago Wanderers (loan)	45	(0)
2015–2016	San Marcos	20	(0)
2016–2017	Iberia	18	(1)
2017–2018	Atlante	11	(0)
2018	San Luis	6	(0)
2019	Rangers	21	(2)
2020–2021	Universidad de Concepción	15	(0)
2021–2022	General Velásquez	24	(3)
2022–2023	Rangers	24	(1)
2024–2025	Provincial Osorno	18	(1)
2026–	General Velásquez	0	(0)

International career^{‡}
2008	Chile U23	3	(0)
2009	Chile U21	5	(0)
2010–2011	Chile	2	(0)
- * Club domestic league appearances and goals as of 19 March 2026 ‡ National team caps and goals as of 14 October 2017

Juan René Abarca Fuentes (born December 7, 1988) is a Chilean footballer who plays as a centre back for General Velásquez.

== Career ==
In January 2012, he was on trial at Dutch side FC Twente but was not offered a contract.

In 2022, Abarca returned to Rangers de Talca after his stint with them in 2019.

In 2026, Abarca returned to General Velásquez after two years with Provincial Osorno.

== Honours ==
Universidad de Chile

- Primera División de Chile (2): 2011 Apertura, 2011–C
- Copa Sudamericana (1): 2011

Chile U21

- Toulon Tournament (1): 2009
