= Donovan Deekman =

Dutch footballer (born 1988)

Personal information
- Full name: Donovan Demian Lucien Deekman
- Date of birth: 23 June 1988 (age 38)
- Place of birth: Amsterdam, Netherlands
- Height: 1.82 m (5 ft 11 1/2 in)
- Position: Striker

Youth career
- Heerenveen

Senior career*
Years	Team	Apps	(Gls)
2007–2009	Heerenveen	1	(0)
2009–2012	Lokeren	32	(3)
2012–2014	Sparta	61	(20)
2014–2015	Concordia Chiajna	3	(0)
2015	Naft Tehran	3	(0)
2016	Telstar	3	(1)
2017	Club Eagles	3	(1)
2017-2018	Voorwaarts Gijzel Oosterzele		
- * Club domestic league appearances and goals as of 7 June 2016

Donovan Demian Lucien Deekman (born 23 June 1988) is a Dutch retired footballer who played as a striker.

== Club career ==
Born in Amsterdam, Deekman has played for Heerenveen, Lokeren, Sparta Rotterdam, Concordia Chiajna and Naft Tehran.

He returned to Holland to play for Telstar in February 2016, only to sign with Maldivian side Club Eagles in February 2017. He left them for Belgian amateur side Voorwaarts Gijzel Oosterzele.
