= Concón National =

Chilean football club

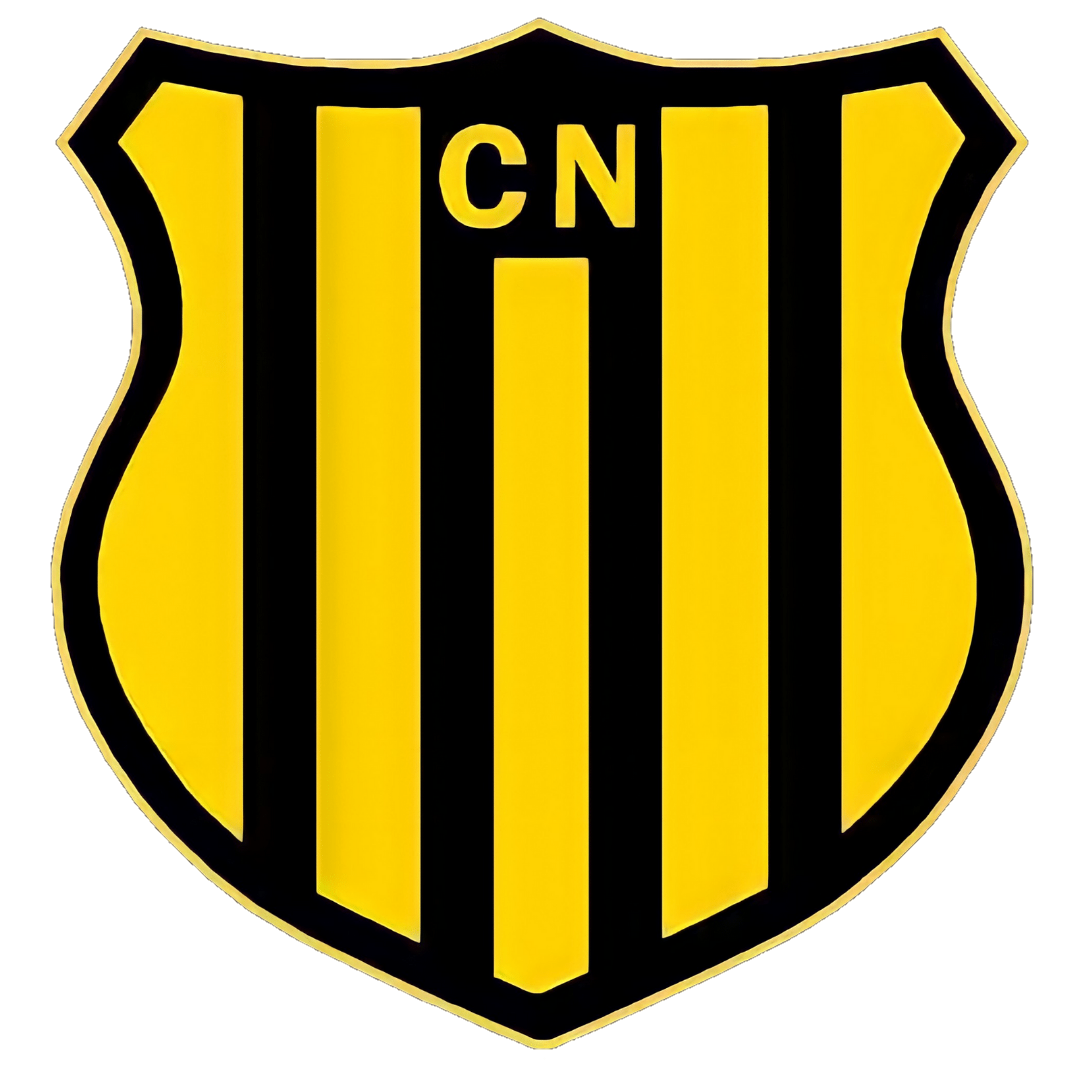
- Full name: Club de Deportes Concón National
- Founded: May 8, 1914
- Ground: Estadio Atlético Municipal; Concón, Chile
- Capacity: 3.000
- Manager: Orlando Gutiérrez
- League: Segunda División Profesional
- 2025: 6th
Home colours	Away colours

Concón National, officially known as Club de Deportes Concón National, is a Chilean football club based in the city of Concón, Valparaíso Region. It was founded on 8 May 1914 and is one of the oldest clubs in the area. The team currently competes in the Segunda División Profesional, the professional third tier of the Chilean football league system.

The club's colours—black and yellow vertical stripes—were established at its founding assembly, along with its first board of directors. Initially participating in local amateur leagues, Concón National joined the Concón Football Association in the 1950s and made its national debut in then-amateur third tier, Tercera A, in 1982.

After fluctuating between amateur and semi-professional levels, the team won the Tercera B (fourth tier) title in 2001, earning promotion back to the third tier. However, it was relegated in 2005 and returned to regional competition. In 2023, the club re-entered the national scene via the Tercera B (now the fifth level), where it finished as runner-up and earned promotion to Tercera A.

The following season, it achieved a second consecutive promotion, reaching the Segunda División Profesional, its first professional league in its history. Concón National plays its home matches at the Estadio Atlético Municipal, a 3,000-seat venue that hosted its first professional match in October 2024.

== History ==
Concón National was founded in 1914 by prominent local figures and the mayor, Daniel Navarro, who were strongly influenced by the English—commonly cited as the inventors of football and who had long arrived in Chilean coastal territories via the Strait of Magellan.

The intention was to establish a sporting institution that represented Concón, promoted local athletics, and encouraged broad civic participation. Early efforts included football events to publicise the new club and the formation of a board led by Navarro. Its members agreed upon a yellow-and-black kit with vertical stripes, and registrations were opened to all interested residents.

A women’s football section was created in 1946, later falling inactive before its reactivation in 2018. The men's team began in the Concón League and later affiliated with the Viña del Mar Association, eventually joining the Concón Football Association. Its sporting peak came in the 1980s with entry into national competition in the 1982 Tercera División de Chile, followed by more than 20 consecutive seasons across Tercera División and Tercera División B de Chile, winning the latter in 2001.

In 2005 the club rebranded as Deportes Concón S.A., a project led by former footballer Elías Figueroa and former tennis player Álvaro Fillol, with the backing of the Municipality of Concón. Aiming to reach the top tiers of Chilean football within five years, the project included plans for a modern multi-sport complex. The team debuted as Deportes Concón S.A. on 29 March 2005 in a friendly against Santiago Wanderers, then entered the 2005 Tercera División de Chile season, but financial difficulties—such as sustaining a squad valued at 4 million pesos—led to the project’s collapse. As a result, the club lost its rights to remain in the division and was disaffiliated.

By mid-2007 Concón National recovered its original legal identity and resumed sport-related projects. Its stadium was remodelled with support from local personalities, the Municipality of Concón, and the Instituto Nacional de Deportes de Chile (IND), with an investment of 18 million pesos for improvements and the construction of a multi-use hall.

=== Professional football ===
In 2023, the club reached the promotion to the third level of Chilean football after beating to Deportes Colchagua.

In its first professional season, Concón finished in the 9th place of the 2024 Segunda División Profesional de Chile. Nevertheless, the club began the tournament with six consecutive defeats under the command of the young coach Agustín Parra, a former Santiago Wanderers player who asked to sign his former teammates Ezequiel Luna and Jefferson Castillo. After Parra's departure, the obtained its first professional victory in a 2–1 away victory over Deportes Rengo, a match that Concón won after a penalty score by Luna in the 90th minute.

At Copa Chile level, the team had a remarkable performance in the round of 32 against Wanderers, to whom they lost by a hard-fought 5–3 at the Estadio Elías Figueroa Brander in Valparaíso.

After finishing in the last positions of the first round of the 2024 league tournament, during the second round Concón achieved important results, such as its victories against Deportes Melipilla, Trasandino, or Lautaro de Buin, which finally left the team in 9th place.

The 2025 season started with the signing of experienced players such as Rodrigo Gattas and Franco Ragusa, the latter having played in the 2013 South American U-20 Championship. By the other hand, the team managed the remodelation of its stadium.

== Titles ==
- Cuarta División de Chile: 1 (2001)

== Players ==
Current squad of Concón National as of 8 August 2026 (edit)
Sources: ConconNational.cl

No.		Position	Player
1	CHI	GK	Christian Fuentes
3	CHI	DF	Marcos Velásquez
4	CHI	DF	Benjamín Fuentes
5	CHI	DF	Gonzalo Santelices
6	ARG	MF	Valentín Demateis
7	ARG	FW	Joaquín Plaza
8	CHI	MF	Bruno Álvarez
9	CHI	FW	Luis Vargas
10	CHI	MF	Franco Ragusa (c)
11	CHI	FW	Giovanni Bustos
12	CHI	GK	Pedro Pizarro
14	CHI	FW	Matías Beltrán
15	CHI	FW	Gabriel Rojas
16	CHI	DF	Franco Cubillos

No.		Position	Player
17	CHI	DF	Kevin Araya
18	CHI	FW	Juan Romero
19	CHI	MF	Jimmy Cisterna
20	CHI	MF	Bastián Bravo
21	CHI	FW	Axel Cerda (loan from Universidad Católica)
22	CHI	FW	Rodrigo Gattas
23	CHI	DF	Cristian Vega
24	CHI	FW	Martín Cárcamo (loan from Everton)
25	CHI	MF	Alexis Ugarte (loan from Everton)
27	CHI	GK	Marcelo Salcedo
28	CHI	FW	Diego Opazo (loan from Santiago Wanderers)
30	CHI	MF	Esteban Luco (loan from Santiago Wanderers)
31	CHI	DF	Ariel Guzmán
36	CHI	DF	Byron Navarro (loan from Everton)

Manager: Orlando Gutiérrez

== Managers ==
- (Chile) Wilson Castillo
- Uruguay Graffigna
- (Chile) Daniel Torres
- (Chile) Mario Salas
- (Argentina) (Chile) Mario Véner
- (Chile) Jorge García (1997–1998)
- (Chile) Ilich Reyes (1999–2003)
- (Chile) Leonardo Vinés (2003)
- (Chile) Ignacio Benavente (2022)
- (Chile) Rodrigo Bendeck (2023)
- (Chile) Cristián Salazar (2023)
- (Chile) Ítalo Pinochet (2023)
- (Chile) Agustín Parra (2024)
- (Chile) Orlando Gutiérrez (2024)
- (Chile) Jonathan Orellana (2024)
- (Chile) Cristián Salazar (2025)
- (Chile) Sebastián Núñez (2025)
- (Chile) Orlando Gutiérrez (2025–Present)
