= Luis Pavez (footballer, born 1988) =

Chilean footballer (born 1988)

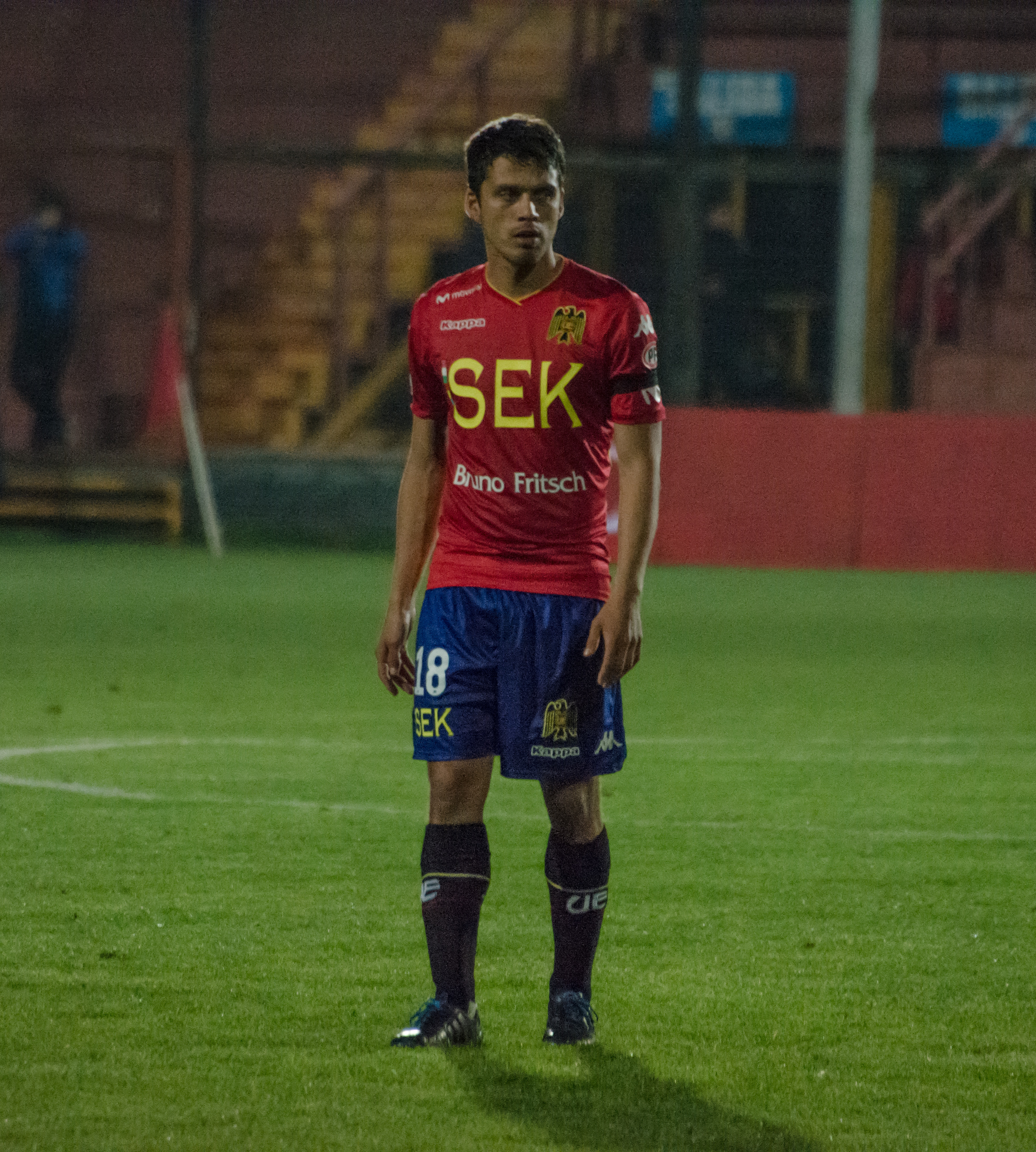
- Pavez with Unión Española in 2018

Personal information
- Full name: Luis Antonio Pavez Contreras
- Date of birth: 23 January 1988 (age 38)
- Place of birth: Santiago, Chile
- Height: 1.74 m (5 ft 9 in)
- Position: Defensive midfielder

Youth career
- Palestino

Senior career*
Years	Team	Apps	(Gls)
2006–2009	Palestino	31	(1)
2007	→ Rangers (loan)	26	(2)
2010–2012	Colo-Colo	24	(1)
2012	→ Cobresal (loan)	28	(0)
2013–2014	Unión Española	20	(0)
2013	Unión Española B	6	(1)
2014–2015	Ñublense	18	(0)
2015–2016	Coquimbo Unido	20	(0)
2016–2017	Potros UAEM	34	(0)
2017–2018	Celaya	20	(0)
2018–2022	Unión Española	70	(0)
2023	Coquimbo Unido	13	(0)
2024	San Luis	11	(0)
Total		321	(5)

International career
2009–2010	Chile U23	7	(0)

Managerial career
- 2025–2026: Unión Española (sport manager)
- * Club domestic league appearances and goals

Luis Antonio Pavez Contreras (born 25 June 1988) is a Chilean former football player who played as a midfielder.

== Club career ==
Pavez was trained at Palestino. As a youth player, he took part in the reality TV show Adidas Selection Team from Fox Sports, where a squad made up by youth players from professional clubs faced players from schools, standing out future professional footballers such as Felipe Seymour, Jean Paul Pineda, Eduardo Vargas, among others.

For the 2023 season, Pavez signed with Coquimbo Unido in the Chilean Primera División. The next year, he switched to San Luis de Quillota.

Pavez ended his contract with San Luis in July 2024 and confirmed his retirement in March 2025.

== International career ==
Pavez represented Chile U21 and Chile U22 at both the 2009 Toulon Tournament and 2010 Toulon Tournament, winning the 2009 edition.

== Post-retirement ==
Following his retirement, Pavez served as coach for the football academy Vitale, whose owner is the former footballer Benjamín Ruiz. Next, he assumed as coordinator for the Unión Española squad.

== Honours ==
Unión Española

- Primera División de Chile (1): 2013 Transición
- Supercopa de Chile (1): 2013

Chile U21

- Toulon Tournament (1): 2009
