= Quintero Unido =

Chilean football club

- Full name: Club de Deportes Quintero Unido
- Founded: June 10, 1962
- Ground: Estadio Municipal Raúl Vargas Verdejo; Quintero, Chile
- Capacity: 2.500
- League: Tercera División
Home colours	Away colours

Club de Deportes Quintero Unido is a Chilean football club, their home town is Quintero, Chile.

The club was founded on June 10, 1962 and participated for 5 years in Primera B, 12 years in Tercera División A and 2 seasons in Tercera División B.

Carlos Rejano was the club's president as of 2024.

== Seasons played ==
- 5 seasons in Primera B
- 12 seasons in Tercera División A
- 2 seasons in Tercera División B

== Honours ==
- Tercera A
  - Champions (1): 2026
- Campeonato de Apertura de la Tercera División de Chile
  - Winners (1): 1983
- Asociación Quintero
  - Winners (1): 1975

== See also ==
- Chilean football league system
