= Gerson Martínez =

Chilean footballer (born 1989)

Personal information
- Full name: Gerson Sebastián Martínez Arredondo
- Date of birth: 10 January 1989 (age 37)
- Place of birth: El Melón, Nogales, Chile
- Height: 1.78 m (5 ft 10 in)
- Position: Striker

Youth career
- 2003: Unión La Calera
- 2003: Universidad Católica
- 2004–2006: San Luis

Senior career*
Years	Team	Apps	(Gls)
2006–2011	San Luis	60	(10)
2012–2013	Colo-Colo	7	(0)
2012	→ Cobreloa (loan)	25	(3)
2013	Colo-Colo B	3	(4)
2013–2016	Deportes Iquique	37	(7)
2014–2016	→ Deportes Antofagasta (loan)	42	(6)
2016–2018	San Luis	56	(5)
2019–2021	Deportes Colina	55	(22)
Total		285	(57)

International career
2009–2010	Chile U20	9	(5)
- * Club domestic league appearances and goals

Gerson Sebastián Martínez Arredondo (born 10 January 1989) is a Chilean former footballer who played as a striker.

== Career ==
He retired at the end of the 2021 season, as a player of Deportes Colina.

Martínez was part of a Chile under-25 squad in a training session led by Claudio Borghi in May 2011, alongside his teammate in San Luis de Quillota, Eusebio Díaz.

== Personal life ==
He is the uncle of Rubén Farfán, a professional footballer who has played for Universidad de Chile and other Chilean clubs.

Following his retirement, Martínez started a purified water and ice making business.

== Honours ==
San Luis de Quillota

- Primera B (1): 2009

Deportes Iquique

- Copa Chile (1): 2013–14

Chile U21

- Toulon Tournament (1): 2009
