= 2009 Toulon Tournament =

Toulon Youth Festival

Tournament details
- Host country: France
- Dates: 3–12 June
- Teams: 8 (from 4 confederations)
- Venues: 5 (in 1 host city)

Final positions
- Champions: Chile (1st title)
- Runners-up: France

Tournament statistics
- Matches played: 16
- Goals scored: 34 (2.13 per match)
- Top scorer(s): (Argentina) Diego Buonanotte (Chile) Gerson Martínez (4 goals each)

The 2009 Toulon Tournament was the 37th edition of the Toulon Tournament, and was held from 3 June to 12 June 2009. The tournament concluded with the final between France and Chile at Stade Mayol in Toulon as Chile won their first title after the final score of 1–0, scored by Gerson Martínez on 73rd minute.

== Participant teams ==
- Argentina
- Egypt
- Netherlands
- United Arab Emirates
- France (host)
- Portugal
- Chile
- Qatar

== Venues ==
The matches are being played in these communes:

- Aubagne
- Bormes
- La Seyne
- Saint-Cyr-sur-Mer
- Toulon

== Results ==
=== Group A ===
Team	Pld	W	D	L	GF	GA	GD	Pts	Qualification
Argentina	3	2	1	0	8	3	+5	7	Advance to Semi-final
Netherlands	3	1	1	1	2	5	−3	4	Advance to Semi-final
United Arab Emirates	3	1	1	1	2	2	0	4	
Egypt	3	0	1	2	3	5	−2	1	

Source: Oleole

==== Fixtures ====
2009-06-03
18:30 CET

Egypt	0–1	United Arab Emirates
	Report	Abdalla 32'

Stade Mayol, Toulon
Referee: Damien Ledentu (France)

2009-06-03
20:45 CET

Argentina	4–0	Netherlands
Jara 10'; Perotti 47'; Banega 65'; Buonanotte 81'	Report

Stade Mayol, Toulon
Referee: Jérôme Laperrière (Switzerland)

2009-06-05
18:30 CET

Netherlands	1–0	United Arab Emirates
Van Wolfswinkel 36'	Report

Stade Marquet, La Seyne
Referee: Carlos Xistra (Portugal)

2009-06-05
20:45 CET

Argentina	3–2	Egypt
Banega 39' (pen.); Gómez 53'; Buonanotte 71'	Report	Ahmed Mohamed 37'; Ramadan 58' (pen.)

Stade Marquet, La Seyne
Referee: Banjar Al-Dosari (Qatar)

2009-06-07
19:00 CET

United Arab Emirates	1–1	Argentina
Al-Menhali 45'	Report	Trecarichi 53'

Stade Saulnier, Saint-Cyr
Referee: Halis Özkahya (Turkey)

2009-06-07
19:00 CET

Egypt	1–1	Netherlands
Afroto 13'	Report	Deekman 67'

Stade H. Delon, Bormes
Referee: Damien Ledentu (France)

=== Group B ===
Team	Pld	W	D	L	GF	GA	GD	Pts	Qualification
Chile	3	3	0	0	5	0	+5	9	Advance to Semi-final
France	3	2	0	1	2	1	+1	6	Advance to Semi-final
Portugal	3	1	0	2	6	2	+4	3	
Qatar	3	0	0	3	0	10	−10	0	

Source: Oleole

==== Fixtures ====
2009-06-04
18:30 CET

Portugal	0–1	Chile
	Report	Martínez 78'

Stade Mayol, Toulon
Referee: Halis Özkahya (Turkey)

2009-06-04
20:45 CET

France	1–0	Qatar
Sako 80+2'	Report

Stade Mayol, Toulon
Referee: Gehad Grisha (Egypt)

2009-06-06
18:30 CET

France	1–0	Portugal
Sankharé 27'	Report

Stade Mayol, Toulon
Referee: Jérôme Laperrière (Switzerland)

2009-06-06
20:45 CET

Qatar	0–3	Chile
	Report	Vargas 23', 65'; Martínez 68'

Stade Mayol, Toulon
Referee: Abdulla Mohamed (United Arab Emirates)

2009-06-08
19:00 CET

Portugal	6–0	Qatar
Coentrão 18' (pen.), 24', 36'; Yazalde 30', 62'; Oliveira 31'	Report

Stade Saulnier, Saint-Cyr
Referee: Abdulla Mohamed (United Arab Emirates)

2009-06-08
19:00 CET

Chile	1–0	France
Martínez 80+1'	Report

Stade De Lattre, Aubagne
Referee: Gehad Grisha (Egypt)

=== Semi-finals ===
2009-06-10
18:00 CET

Chile	1–1	Netherlands
Vargas 20'	Report	Van Wolfswinkel 11'
Penalties
Martínez (penalty scored); Medel (penalty scored); Vargas (penalty scored); Pavez (penalty scored); Barrera (penalty scored)	5–4	(penalty scored) Deekman; (penalty scored) Ter Horst; (penalty scored) Janmaat; (penalty scored) Roorda; (penalty missed) Van Wolfswinkel

Stade Mayol, Toulon
Referee: Carlos Xistra (Portugal)

2009-06-10
20:00 CET

Argentina	1–1	France
Buonanotte 10'	Report	Kembo Ekoko 6'
Penalties
Perotti (penalty missed); Banega (penalty scored); Pezzella (penalty missed); Jara (penalty missed)	1–3	(penalty scored) Sertic; (penalty missed) Capoue; (penalty scored) Ngog; (penalty scored) Sako

Stade Mayol, Toulon
Referee: Halis Özkahya (Turkey)

=== Third-place playoff ===
2009-06-12
18:00 CET

Netherlands	0–1	Argentina
	Report	Buonanotte 78'

Stade Mayol, Toulon
Referee: Damien Ledentu (France)

=== Final ===
2009-06-12
20:45 CET

Chile	1–0	France
Martínez 73'	Report

Stade Mayol, Toulon
Referee: Jérôme Laperrière (Switzerland)

== Winners ==
2009 Toulon Tournament winners

Chile
First title

== Goal scorers ==
4 goals

- (Argentina) Diego Buonanotte
- (Chile) Gerson Martínez

3 goals

- (Portugal) Fábio Coentrão
- (Chile) Eduardo Vargas

2 goals

- (Argentina) Éver Banega
- (Portugal) Yazalde
- (Netherlands) Ricky van Wolfswinkel

1 goal

- (Argentina) Alejandro Gómez
- (Argentina) Franco Jara
- (Argentina) Diego Perotti
- (United Arab Emirates) Mohamed Fawzi Abdalla
- (France) Bakary Sako
- (Egypt) Marzouk Salah
- (Egypt) Islam Ramadan
- (France) Younousse Sankharé
- (Netherlands) Donovan Deekman
- (Egypt) Afroto
- (Argentina) Lucas Trecarichi
- (United Arab Emirates) Sultan Al-Menhali
- (Portugal) Stanislas Oliveira
- (France) Jirès Kembo Ekoko
