= 2012 Santiago Wanderers season =

Santiago Wanderers
2012 season
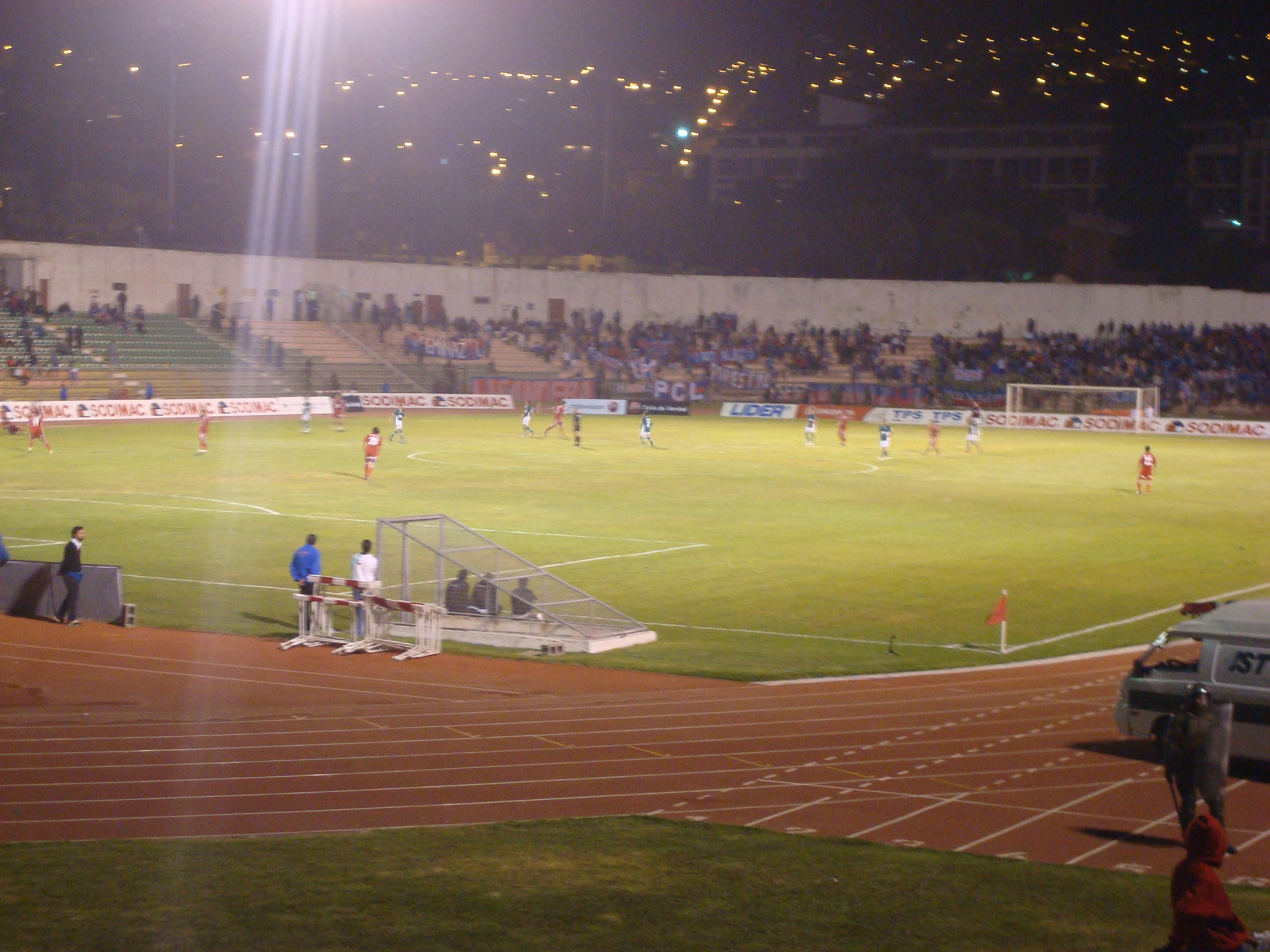
- The Estadio Playa Ancha was closed after the end of the season in order to start its renovation process.
- President: (Chile) Jorge Lafrentz
- Coach: (Chile) Arturo Salah (until 15 August) (Chile) Ivo Basay
- Stadium: Estadio Playa Ancha
- Torneo Apertura: 11th
- Torneo Clausura: 15th
- Copa Chile: Group stage
- Top goalscorer: League: Sebastián Ubilla (11); All: Sebastián Ubilla (11)
- Highest home attendance: 11,719 (vs Colo-Colo, 4 Mar)
- Lowest home attendance: 1,269 (vs Unión La Calera, 29 Aug)
- Average home league attendance: 6,269

The 2012 season was Santiago Wanderers's 55th season at the Campeonato Nacional and the 3rd consecutive season in the top flight of Chilean football, since their last promotion in 2009. The club participated in both tournaments of the Primera División, the Apertura and the Clausura, and also participated in the Copa Chile.

In this season, the club celebrated its 120th anniversary since its foundation in 1892. In July 2012, it was announced that the Estadio Playa Ancha will be renovated, renamed as Elías Figueroa Stadium and expanded to 25,000 seats in order to become a host venue for the upcoming 2015 Copa América. The stadium was closed in October 2012 and partially demolished afterwards, right after the end of the regular season.

In football, the team had regular results during this season, being unable to qualify to the playoffs in both Apertura and Clausura tournaments. The team was managed by Arturo Salah for most of the season, but the bad results and a 14-match winless streak forced him to resign in mid-August. During the last 10 matches of the Clausura tournament, Ivo Basay took the team and managed to save it from relegation to Primera B.

The season covers the period from 1 January to 31 December 2012.

== Kits ==
Supplier: (England) Mitre
Sponsor(s): (Chile) Terminal Pacífico Sur, (Chile) Entel (shoulders), (Chile) Clos de Pirque (socks)

| Home | Away |

== Transfers ==
=== Apertura 2012 ===
The following players joined the team during the Apertura.

- (Chile) Boris Sandoval (from (Chile) Huachipato)
- (Chile) Eladio Herrera (from (Chile) Deportes Puerto Montt)
- (Chile) Roberto Órdenes (from (Chile) Unión La Calera)
- (Chile) Juan Gonzalo Lorca (from (France) US Boulogne)
- (Chile) Rodrigo Toloza (from (Chile) Universidad Católica)
- (Argentina) Pablo Calandria (from (Chile) Universidad Católica)

=== Clausura 2012 ===
In

- (Chile) Jorge Ormeño (from (Chile) Universidad Católica)
- (Argentina) Ariel Cólzera (from (Chile) Unión La Calera)
- (Uruguay) Mauricio Prieto (from (Uruguay) River Plate)
- (Colombia) Tressor Moreno (from (United States) San Jose Earthquakes)
- (Argentina) Luis Salmerón (from (Argentina) Ferro Carril Oeste)

Out

- (Chile) Juan Gonzalo Lorca (to (Ecuador) Deportivo Quito)
- (Argentina) Sebastián Rusculleda (to (Ecuador) Deportivo Quito)
- (Argentina) Nicolás Martínez (to (Spain) Real Murcia)
- Sebastián Ubilla (to Universidad de Chile)

== Friendly matches ==
=== Pre-season ===
| 14 January 2012 Pirate night | Coquimbo Unido | 0–1 | Santiago Wanderers | Coquimbo |
| | | Report | Toloza 44' (pen.) | Stadium: Francisco Sánchez Rumoroso |

| 17 January 2012 Green night | Santiago Wanderers | 1–1 | Unión San Felipe | Valparaíso |
| | Sandoval 13' | Report | Carballo 42' | Stadium: Playa Ancha |

| 19 January 2012 Friendly | Unión La Calera | 1–0 | Santiago Wanderers | Concón |
| 11:00 | Carreño 26' | Report | | Stadium: Complejo Deportivo de Mantagua |

| 21 January 2012 Seaport derby | Everton | 3–3 | Santiago Wanderers | Viña del Mar |
| 18:00 | Maureira 23'; Rojas 67'; Ragusa 83' | Report | Toloza 7'; Martínez 48'; Sandoval 73' | Stadium: Sausalito; Referee: Cristián Basso |

=== Mid-season ===
| 26 September 2012 Friendly | Santiago Wanderers | 1–0 | San Luis de Quillota | Villa Alemana |
| | Núñez | Report | | Stadium: Estadio Ítalo Composto; Attendance: 4,000 |

=== Copa Decanos de los Andes ===
| 15 August 2012 1st Leg | Santiago Wanderers | 1–4 | (Argentina) Quilmes | Valparaíso, Chile |
| 16:00 UTC−4 | Cólzera 90' (pen.) | Report | Núñez 35'; Díaz 38'; Sandoval 50' (o.g.); Insaurralde 69' | Stadium: Playa Ancha; Attendance: 3,500; Referee: Claudio Puga (Chile) |

| 27 November 2012 2nd Leg | Quilmes (Argentina) | 2–0 (6–1 agg.) | Santiago Wanderers | Quilmes, Argentina |
| 19:15 UTC−3 | Toloza 77'; Núñez 83' | Report | | Stadium: Centenario José Luis Meiszner; Attendance: 10,000; Referee: Federico Beligoy (Argentina) |

== Season results ==
=== Torneo Apertura ===
==== League table ====
| Pos | Team | Pld | W | D | L | GF | GA | GD | Pts |
|---|---|---|---|---|---|---|---|---|---|
| 9 | Huachipato | 17 | 6 | 5 | 6 | 25 | 28 | −3 | 23 |
| 10 | Universidad de Concepción | 17 | 5 | 6 | 6 | 23 | 27 | −4 | 21 |
| 11 | Santiago Wanderers | 17 | 6 | 2 | 9 | 28 | 30 | −2 | 20 |
| 12 | Audax Italiano | 17 | 5 | 5 | 7 | 24 | 32 | −8 | 20 |
| 13 | Deportes La Serena | 17 | 5 | 4 | 8 | 24 | 33 | −9 | 19 |

Source: Asociación Nacional de Fútbol Profesional
Rules for classification: 1st points; 2nd wins; 3rd goal difference; 4th goals scored; 5th away goals; 6th red cards; 7th yellow cards; 8th draw.

| Pos | Team | Pld | W | D | L | GF | GA | GD | Pts |
|---|---|---|---|---|---|---|---|---|---|
| 13 | Deportes Antofagasta | 17 | 6 | 2 | 9 | 26 | 29 | −3 | 20 |
| 14 | O'Higgins | 17 | 5 | 5 | 7 | 22 | 27 | −5 | 20 |
| 15 | Santiago Wanderers | 17 | 4 | 7 | 6 | 27 | 28 | −1 | 19 |
| 16 | Universidad de Concepción | 17 | 3 | 6 | 8 | 17 | 28 | −11 | 15 |
| 17 | Unión La Calera | 17 | 2 | 9 | 6 | 11 | 18 | −7 | 15 |

Source: Asociación Nacional de Fútbol Profesional
Rules for classification: 1st points; 2nd wins; 3rd goal difference; 4th goals scored; 5th away goals; 6th red cards; 7th yellow cards; 8th draw.

==== Results summary ====
| Overall | | | | | | | | Home | | | | | | Away | | | | | |
| Pld | W | D | L | GF | GA | GD | Pts | W | D | L | GF | GA | GD | W | D | L | GF | GA | GD |
|---|---|---|---|---|---|---|---|---|---|---|---|---|---|---|---|---|---|---|---|
| 17 | 6 | 2 | 9 | 28 | 30 | −2 | 20 | 4 | 2 | 2 | 15 | 11 | +4 | 2 | 0 | 7 | 13 | 19 | −6 |

Source: Sólo Fútbol

==== Result round by round ====
| Round | 1 | 2 | 3 | 4 | 5 | 6 | 7 | 8 | 9 | 10 | 11 | 12 | 13 | 14 | 15 | 16 | 17 |
|---|---|---|---|---|---|---|---|---|---|---|---|---|---|---|---|---|---|
| Ground | A | H | A | H | A | H | A | H | A | H | A | A | H | H | A | H | A |
| Result | L | W | W | W | L | D | L | W | W | W | L | L | D | L | L | L | L |
| Position | 13 | 7 | 4 | 2 | 4 | 6 | 8 | 5 | 3 | 3 | 3 | 6 | 7 | 7 | 7 | 10 | 11 |

Source: Sólo Fútbol
A = Away; H = Home; W = Win; D = Draw; L = Loss

==== Matches ====
| 28 January 2012 1 | Huachipato | 2–1 | Santiago Wanderers | Talcahuano |
| 20:30 | Rodríguez 61', 68' | Report | Toloza 14' | Stadium: CAP; Attendance: 2,576; Referee: Claudio Puga |

| 4 February 2012 2 | Santiago Wanderers | 2–1 | Universidad Católica | Valparaíso |
| 16:00 | Godoy 40'; Ubilla 63' | Report | Ríos 75' | Stadium: Playa Ancha; Attendance: 6,931; Referee: Eduardo Gamboa |

| 12 February 2012 3 | Rangers | 2–3 | Santiago Wanderers | Talca |
| 11:00 | Caraglio 53', 78' | Report | Ubilla 40', 61'; Silva 89' | Stadium: Fiscal; Attendance: 3,327; Referee: Cristian Rojas |

| 18 February 2012 4 | Santiago Wanderers | 4–2 | Audax Italiano | Valparaíso |
| 16:00 | Ubilla 34', 67'; Parra 77'; Rusculleda 82' (pen.) | Report | Villarroel 65' (o.g.); Mora 86' | Stadium: Playa Ancha; Attendance: 5,053; Referee: Roberto Tobar |

| 25 February 2012 5 | Deportes La Serena | 3–1 | Santiago Wanderers | La Serena |
| 20:30 | Salazar 21', 49'; Jadue 76' | Report | Ubilla 37' | Stadium: La Portada; Attendance: 2,882; Referee: Patricio Polic |

| 4 March 2012 6 | Santiago Wanderers | 0–0 | Colo-Colo | Valparaíso |
| 17:00 | | Report | | Stadium: Playa Ancha; Attendance: 11,719; Referee: Eduardo Gamboa |

| 11 March 2012 7 | Deportes Antofagasta | 1–0 | Santiago Wanderers | Antofagasta |
| 12:00 | Portillo 64' | Report | | Stadium: Parque Juan López; Attendance: 2,560; Referee: Claudio Fuenzalida |

| 16 March 2012 8 | Santiago Wanderers | 1–0 | Unión San Felipe | Valparaíso |
| 20:00 | Méndez 90+1' | Report | | Stadium: Playa Ancha; Attendance: 4,067; Referee: Claudio Puga |

| 23 March 2012 9 | Universidad de Concepción | 2–5 | Santiago Wanderers | Concepción |
| 20:15 | Guerra 38'; Muñoz 62' (pen.) | Report | Calandria 5'; Ubilla 20', 54', 80'; Toloza 53' | Stadium: Collao; Attendance: 1,500; Referee: Álvaro García |

| 31 March 2012 10 | Santiago Wanderers | 5–2 | Cobresal | Valparaíso |
| 12:30 | Rusculleda 12' (pen.); Lorca 17', 34'; Ubilla 42', 70' | Report | Pallante 50'; Cuéllar 58' (pen.) | Stadium: Playa Ancha; Attendance: 5,301; Referee: Cristián Andaur |

| 8 April 2012 11 | Universidad de Chile | 3–0 | Santiago Wanderers | Ñuñoa, Santiago |
| 16:00 | Henríquez 24'; J. Fernandes 51'; Hernández 89' | Report | | Stadium: Nacional; Attendance: 6,538; Referee: Claudio Puga |

| 14 April 2012 12 | Palestino | 2–1 | Santiago Wanderers | La Cisterna, Santiago |
| 12:30 | Flores 19'; Henríquez 32' | Report | Villarroel 90+2' | Stadium: Municipal; Attendance: 1,720; Referee: Claudio Fuenzalida |

| 21 April 2012 13 | Santiago Wanderers | 2–2 | Unión Española | Valparaíso |
| 16:00 | Calandria 28'; Méndez 50' | Report | Herrera 9'; Jaime 80' | Stadium: Playa Ancha; Attendance: 5,236; Referee: Álvaro García |

| 28 April 2012 14 | Santiago Wanderers | 0–1 | O'Higgins | Valparaíso |
| 20:30 | | Report | Gutiérrez 63' | Stadium: Playa Ancha; Attendance: 6,811; Referee: Enrique Osses |

| 5 May 2012 15 | Deportes Iquique | 2–1 | Santiago Wanderers | Iquique |
| 16:00 | Ramos 37'; Bogado 72' | Report | Méndez 59' | Stadium: Tierra de Campeones; Attendance: 5,684; Referee: Claudio Puga |

| 12 May 2012 16 | Santiago Wanderers | 1–3 | Cobreloa | Valparaíso |
| 16:00 | Toloza 47' | Report | Díaz 4'; Canío 26'; Flores 33' | Stadium: Playa Ancha; Attendance: 5,612; Referee: Claudio Fuenzalida |

| 18 May 2012 17 | Unión La Calera | 2–1 | Santiago Wanderers | Quillota |
| 20:00 | Cellerino 4'; Simón 53' | Report | Calandria 48' | Stadium: Lucio Fariña; Attendance: 3,000; Referee: Patricio Polic |

=== Torneo Clausura ===
==== League table ====
| Pos | Team | Pld | W | D | L | GF | GA | GD | Pts |
|---|---|---|---|---|---|---|---|---|---|
| 9 | Huachipato | 17 | 6 | 5 | 6 | 25 | 28 | −3 | 23 |
| 10 | Universidad de Concepción | 17 | 5 | 6 | 6 | 23 | 27 | −4 | 21 |
| 11 | Santiago Wanderers | 17 | 6 | 2 | 9 | 28 | 30 | −2 | 20 |
| 12 | Audax Italiano | 17 | 5 | 5 | 7 | 24 | 32 | −8 | 20 |
| 13 | Deportes La Serena | 17 | 5 | 4 | 8 | 24 | 33 | −9 | 19 |

Source: Asociación Nacional de Fútbol Profesional
Rules for classification: 1st points; 2nd wins; 3rd goal difference; 4th goals scored; 5th away goals; 6th red cards; 7th yellow cards; 8th draw.

| Pos | Team | Pld | W | D | L | GF | GA | GD | Pts |
|---|---|---|---|---|---|---|---|---|---|
| 13 | Deportes Antofagasta | 17 | 6 | 2 | 9 | 26 | 29 | −3 | 20 |
| 14 | O'Higgins | 17 | 5 | 5 | 7 | 22 | 27 | −5 | 20 |
| 15 | Santiago Wanderers | 17 | 4 | 7 | 6 | 27 | 28 | −1 | 19 |
| 16 | Universidad de Concepción | 17 | 3 | 6 | 8 | 17 | 28 | −11 | 15 |
| 17 | Unión La Calera | 17 | 2 | 9 | 6 | 11 | 18 | −7 | 15 |

Source: Asociación Nacional de Fútbol Profesional
Rules for classification: 1st points; 2nd wins; 3rd goal difference; 4th goals scored; 5th away goals; 6th red cards; 7th yellow cards; 8th draw.

==== Results summary ====
| Overall | | | | | | | | Home | | | | | | Away | | | | | |
| Pld | W | D | L | GF | GA | GD | Pts | W | D | L | GF | GA | GD | W | D | L | GF | GA | GD |
|---|---|---|---|---|---|---|---|---|---|---|---|---|---|---|---|---|---|---|---|
| 17 | 4 | 7 | 6 | 27 | 28 | −1 | 19 | 3 | 4 | 2 | 15 | 12 | +3 | 1 | 3 | 4 | 12 | 16 | −4 |

Source: Sólo Fútbol

==== Result round by round ====
| Round | 1 | 2 | 3 | 4 | 5 | 6 | 7 | 8 | 9 | 10 | 11 | 12 | 13 | 14 | 15 | 16 | 17 |
|---|---|---|---|---|---|---|---|---|---|---|---|---|---|---|---|---|---|
| Ground | H | A | H | A | H | A | H | A | H | A | H | H | A | A | H | A | H |
| Result | D | L | D | L | D | D | L | L | W | L | D | L | D | D | W | W | W |
| Position | 9 | 14 | 14 | 17 | 18 | 17 | 17 | 18 | 17 | 17 | 17 | 17 | 17 | 18 | 16 | 15 | 15 |

Source: Sólo Fútbol
A = Away; H = Home; W = Win; D = Draw; L = Loss

==== Matches ====
| 7 July 2012 1 | Santiago Wanderers | 1–1 | Huachipato | Valparaíso |
| 18:15 | Merlo 70' (o.g.) | Report | B. Rodríguez 59' | Stadium: Playa Ancha; Attendance: 4,706; Referee: Eduardo Gamboa |

| 14 July 2012 2 | Universidad Católica | 3–2 | Santiago Wanderers | Las Condes, Santiago |
| 18:15 | Álvarez 24'; Valenzuela 78'; Peralta 80' | Report | Silva 30'; Órdenes 89' | Stadium: San Carlos de Apoquindo; Attendance: 6,273; Referee: Claudio Puga |

| 21 July 2012 3 | Santiago Wanderers | 2–2 | Rangers | Valparaíso |
| 18:15 | Órdenes 22'; Tapia 47' (o.g.) | Report | Llanos 64'; Gómez 85' | Stadium: Playa Ancha; Attendance: 4,555; Referee: Álvaro García |

| 28 July 2012 4 | Audax Italiano | 4–1 | Santiago Wanderers | La Florida, Santiago |
| 18:15 | García 45'; Canuhé 72'; Drocco 87'; G. Rodríguez 90' | Report | Toloza 86' | Stadium: Bicentenario; Attendance: 5,348; Referee: Julio Bascuñán |

| 4 August 2012 5 | Santiago Wanderers | 1–1 | Deportes La Serena | Valparaíso |
| 17:45 | Núñez 90' | Report | Salazar 44' | Stadium: Playa Ancha; Attendance: 5,719; Referee: Claudio Fuenzalida |

| 12 August 2012 6 | Colo-Colo | 1–1 | Santiago Wanderers | Macul, Santiago |
| 18:00 | Muñoz 67'; Contreras (red card) 49'; Vega (red card) 84' | Report | Herrera 29' | Stadium: Monumental; Attendance: 2,520; Referee: Jorge Osorio |

| 18 August 2012 7 | Santiago Wanderers | 0–1 | Deportes Antofagasta | Valparaíso |
| 20:30 | | Report | Herrera 64' (o.g.) | Stadium: Playa Ancha; Attendance: 4,957; Referee: Julio Bascuñán |

| 25 August 2012 8 | Unión San Felipe | 1–0 | Santiago Wanderers | San Felipe |
| 20:30 | Muñoz 50' | Report | | Stadium: Municipal; Attendance: 2,364; Referee: Manuel Acosta |

| 1 September 2012 9 | Santiago Wanderers | 3–1 | Universidad de Concepción | Valparaíso |
| 12:30 | Cólzera 22' (pen.); Calandria 55'; Castillo 83' | Report | Vargas 10' | Stadium: Playa Ancha; Attendance: 6,888; Referee: Roberto Tobar |

| 15 September 2012 10 | Cobresal | 2–1 | Santiago Wanderers | El Salvador |
| 16:00 | Cuéllar 2'; Herrera 58' | Report | Salmerón 13' | Stadium: El Cobre; Attendance: 536; Referee: Manuel Acosta |

| 22 September 2012 11 | Santiago Wanderers | 2–2 | Universidad de Chile | Valparaíso |
| 16:00 | Castillo 28'; Silva 80'; Prieto (red card) 90+2' | Report | Gutiérrez 83'; Castro 90+1' | Stadium: Playa Ancha; Attendance: 11,592; Referee: Jorge Osorio |

| 30 September 2012 12 | Santiago Wanderers | 2–3 | Palestino | Valparaíso |
| 18:30 | Toloza 11'; Cólzera 27' (pen.) | Report | Silva 11'; Riquelme 39'; Rosende 84' | Stadium: Playa Ancha; Attendance: 8.953; Referee: Roberto Tobar |

| 5 October 2012 13 | Unión Española | 2–2 | Santiago Wanderers | Independencia, Santiago |
| 20:00 | Rubio 59'; Barriga 67' | Report | Lobos 47' (o.g.); Schultz 73' | Stadium: Santa Laura; Attendance: 2,644; Referee: Julio Bascuñán |

| 20 October 2012 14 | O'Higgins | 1–1 | Santiago Wanderers | Rancagua |
| 20:30 | Fernández 1' | Report | Ormeño 66'; Parra (red card) 83' | Stadium: El Teniente; Attendance: 5,303; Referee: Claudio Puga |

| 24 October 2012 15 | Santiago Wanderers | 2–1 | Deportes Iquique | Valparaíso |
| 20:00 | Cólzera 11'; Ormeño 44' | Report | Díaz 24' (pen.) | Stadium: Playa Ancha; Attendance: 8,342; Referee: Jorge Osorio |

| 4 November 2012 16 | Cobreloa | 2–4 | Santiago Wanderers | Calama |
| 16:00 | Martínez 80'; Díaz (red card) 90'; Comba 90+1' | Report | Sandoval 28'; Toloza 52'; Salmerón 58'; Calandria 81' | Stadium: Municipal; Attendance: 4,462; Referee: Claudio Fuenzalida |

| 14 November 2012 17 | Santiago Wanderers | 2–0 | Unión La Calera | Valparaíso |
| 20:00 | Prieto 18'; Salmerón 23' | Report | Cellerino (red card) 90' | Stadium: Playa Ancha; Attendance: 11,138; Referee: Claudio Puga |

=== Copa Chile ===
| Team | Pld | W | D | L | GF | GA | GD | Pts | SMOR | UCHI | ULCA | SWAN |
|---|---|---|---|---|---|---|---|---|---|---|---|---|
| Santiago Morning | 6 | 3 | 2 | 1 | 10 | 11 | −1 | 11 | | 0–5 | 2–1 | 2–0 |
| Universidad de Chile | 6 | 2 | 3 | 1 | 15 | 8 | +7 | 9 | 3–3 | | 1–2 | 2–2 |
| Unión La Calera | 6 | 2 | 2 | 2 | 6 | 8 | −2 | 8 | 1–1 | 0–0 | | 2–1 |
| Santiago Wanderers | 6 | 1 | 1 | 4 | 8 | 12 | −4 | 4 | 1–2 | 1–4 | 3–0 | |

| 8 August 2012 1 | Santiago Wanderers | 1–2 | Santiago Morning | Valparaíso |
| 19:00 | Salmerón 8' | Report | Espinoza 33'; Vranjicán 45' (pen.) | Stadium: Playa Ancha; Attendance: 1,892; Referee: Patricio Blanca |

| 29 August 2012 2 | Santiago Wanderers | 3–0 | Unión La Calera | Valparaíso |
| 19:00 | H. Núñez 20'; Calandria 45'; Salmerón 90' | Report | | Stadium: Playa Ancha; Attendance: 1,269; Referee: Enrique Osses |

| 9 September 2012 3 | Universidad de Chile | 2–2 | Santiago Wanderers | Ñuñoa, Santiago |
| 18:30 | Carmona 13'; Leyton 45+6' | Report | Salmerón 14', 74' | Stadium: Nacional; Attendance: 14,832; Referee: Patricio Polic |

| 10 October 2012 4 | Santiago Morning | 2–0 | Santiago Wanderers | La Pintana, Santiago |
| 17:00 | J. Núñez 40'; Vranjicán 90' | Report | | Stadium: Municipal; Attendance: 389; Referee: Francisco Caamaño |

| 13 October 2012 5 | Santiago Wanderers | 1–4 | Universidad de Chile | Valparaíso |
| 16:00 | Cólzera 39' | Report | Castro 36'; Marino 51'; Ubilla 53'; Lorenzetti 64' | Stadium: Playa Ancha; Attendance: 3,536; Referee: Roberto Tobar |

| 17 October 2012 6 | Unión La Calera | 2–1 | Santiago Wanderers | La Calera |
| | Berríos 5'; Valencia 43' | Report | H. Núñez 53' | Stadium: Nicolás Chahuán; Attendance: 1,905 |
