= List of foreign Liga Bantrab players =

This is a list of foreign players in Liga Bantrab. The following players:

1. have played at least one official game for their respective clubs.
2. are listed as squad members for the current .
3. have not been capped for the Guatemala national team at any level.
4. includes uncapped players with dual nationality.

In italic: Players currently signed, but have yet to play a league match.

In bold: players that played at least one Liga Nos Une game in 2025–26 season, and the clubs they have played for.

== Naturalized Players (Note: Players that have been born abroad, moved to Guatemala later than the age of twelve, acquired Guatemalan citizenship and waived the opportunity to play for the national teams of their native countries in order to be eligible to play for Guatemala) ==
- (Honduras) Darwin Oliva – Municipal
- (Honduras) Gerson Tinoco
- (Honduras) Dennis López - Deportes Savio, Deportivo Petapa, Deportivo Mixco, Deportivo Marquense and C.S.D. Municipal
- (Honduras) Rigoberto Gómez - Comunicaciones
- (Brazil) Israel Silva - Teculutan, Xelaju, Municipal, Jalapa, Antigua

== Africa (CAF) ==
=== Ghana ===
- James Owusu-Ansah – Aurora FC

=== Nigeria ===
- Adeola Ibidokun - Deportivo Heredia
- Ortega Deniran - Suchitepéquez
- Kamar Oshioke - Deportivo Carchá
- Agustine Nwoko - Aurora FC

=== Sierra Leone ===
- Abdul Thompson Conteh – Comunicaciones – 1999–00

== Asia (AFC) ==
=== Palestine ===
- Matías Jadue - Suchitepéquez (2022)

=== South Korea ===
- You Ki Sun - Siquinalá

== Europe (UEFA) ==
=== Czech Republic ===
- Petr Kostelník - Municipal

=== Italy ===
- Andrés Masoni - Zacapa

=== Slovakia ===
- Jan Kusy - Municipal, USAC, Aurora

=== Spain ===
- Alvaro Portero Diez - Siquinalá
- José Ortega - Siquinalá
- **David Grande** - Marquense

== North and Central America, Caribbean (CONCACAF) ==
=== Belize ===
- Shane Orio - Suchitepéquez
- Randy Padilla - Mictlan
- Selvin de León - Xelaju, Comunicaciones, Petapa, Malacateco

=== Canada ===
- Andrés Matías Fresenga - Suchitepéquez
- David Monsalve - Suchitepéquez

=== Costa Rica ===
- Álvaro Aguilar - Xelaju
- Víctor Andrey Bolívar - Antigua, Petapa, Malacateco, Sanarate
- Daniel Cambronero - Malacateco
- Aaron Navarro Cespedes - Guastatoya
- Jhonny Cubero - Comunicaciones, Xelajú, Juventud Escuintleca, Coatepeque
- Kenny Cunningham - Malacateco
- Diego Alonso Estrada - Comunicaciones
- Rolando Fonseca - Comunicaciones
- Andrey Francis - CSD Municipal, Malacateco
- Andy Furtado - Comunicaciones
- Jorge Ignacio Gatgens - Guastatoya
- Ronald Gomez - Municipal
- Rónald González - Comunicaciones
- Carlos Hernández - Municipal
- Carlos Herrera
- Andy Herron - USAC
- Gabriel Leiva - Malacateco
- Adrián de Lemos - Antigua, Guastatoya
- Rafael Andrés Lezacano - Carcha, Malacateco, Antigua
- Luis Marín - USAC
- José Mena - Antigua
- Allan Miranda - Antigua, Malacateco
- Josué Mitchell - Malacateco, Coban Imperial
- Nestor William Monge - Comunicaciones
- Aaron Navarro - Guastatoya
- Anllel Porras - Antigua
- Alexis Rivera
- Eric Arnoldo Scott - Comunicaciones
- Verny Scott - Siquinala
- Mauricio Solís - Comunicaciones
- William Sunsing - Cobán Imperial, Xelajú MC, Sayaxché
- Michael Umaña - Comunicaciones
- Luis Daniel Vallejos - Deportivo Ayutla
- Mauricio Wright – Comunicaciones

=== Cuba ===
- **Karel Espino** – Comunicaciones – 2021–
- Aricheell Hernández – Mixco
- Yasniel Matos – Municipal, Marquense
- **Dairon Reyes** – Comunicaciones – 2025–
- Yasniel Matos - Municipal
- Yunior Pérez - Municipal, Achuapa, Santa Lucia
- Yosel Piedra - Sanarate
- Eduardo Hernandez - Municipal

=== El Salvador ===
- José Rolando Aguirre – Juventud Retalteca, CSD Municipal, Xelajú
- Jaime Alas – Municipal, Antigua, Guastatoya
- Carlos Castro Borja – Zacapa
- Efrain Burgos – Coban Imperial
- Rafael Burgos – Petapa, USAC
- Josué Flores – Guastatoya
- Óscar Fuentes – Peñarol La Mesilla
- Mauricio Ernesto González – Xelajú
- Norberto Huezo – Jalapa, Deportivo Escuintla
- Alexander Larín – Comunicaciones
- Raúl Magaña – Tipografía Nacional, Municipal, USAC
- Juan Ramon Martinez – Municipal
- Edgardo Mira – Siquinala – 2017–18
- Luis Guevara Mora – Aurora, Xelaju MC
- Eliseo Quintanilla – Municipal
- Mauricio Quintanilla – Xelaju MC
- Guillermo Rivera – USAC
- José Luis Rugamas – Municipal
- Kevin Santamaria – Suchitepéquez
- José Alberto Tobar – Siquinalá

=== Honduras ===
- Quiarol Arzú – Guastatoya, Siquinalá
- Mario Castellanos – Heredia
- Santos Crisanto – Iztapa, Carcha, Gustatoya
- Nelson Martín Crossa – Municipal
- Rigoberto Gomez – Communicaciones
- Óscar Isaula – Malacateco
- Dennis Elias López – Municipal
- Walter Martinez – Xelaju
- Juan Cruz Murillo - Cobán Imperial
- Sergio Mendoza - USAC
- Rommel Murillo - Halcones de La Mesilla
- Milton Núñez - USAC
- Darwin Eusebio Oliva - Saranate
- Carlos Pavón - Communicaciones
- Francisco Antonio Pavón - Xelaju
- Orvin Paz - Malacateco
- Jonathan Posas - Marquense, Suchitepequez, Sanarate
- Luis Rene Rodas - Siquinalá
- Angel Dionisio Rodríguez – Guastatoya
- Henry Suazo – Petapa, USAC, Marquense, Halcones de La Mesilla
- Ángel Tejeda – Santa Lucia Cotzumalguapa
- Danilo Turcios – Communicaciones
- Jorge Zaldivar – Antigua, USAC, Sanarate

=== Jamaica ===
- Nicholas Nelson – Xelajú MC
- Akeem Priestley - Antigua

=== Mexico ===
- Othoniel Arce – Siquinalá, Suchitepéquez, CSD Municipal
- Marco Bueno – Comunicaciones – 2021–22
- Luis Gerardo Arroyo – Siquinalá
- Sergio Blancas – Chiantla, Siquinalá, Iztapa
- Darío Carreño – Comunicaciones
- Miguel Casanova – Peñarol
- Omar Dominguez – Gustatoya
- Carlos Kamiani – Municipal, USAC, Xelaju
- César Ivan García – Siquinalá
- Agustín Enrique Herrera – Antigua, Comunicaciones
- Luis Angel Landín – CSD Municipal, Guastatoya
- Raúl Nava López – Iztapa
- Brayan Adán Martínez – Xelaju
- Juan Carlos Meza – Sanarate
- Daniel Guzmán Miranda – Suchitepéquez, Chiantla, Guastatoya
- César Rosario Morales – Antigua, Comunicaciones, Xelajú
- Edgar Iván Pacheco – Antigua
- Mario Alberto Polanco – Marquense
- Ricardo Elionai Rocha – Malacateco
- Isaac Acuña Sánchez – Sanarate
- Liborio Vicente Sánchez – Chiantla, Iztapa
- Juan Carlos Silva – Malacateco, Sanarate, Xelaju
- Emmanuel Tapia – Guastatoya, Suchitepéquez

=== Nicaragua ===
- Juan Barrera – Comunicaciones, Municipal, Xelajú, Guastatoya
- Eulises Pavón – Suchitepéquez
- Roger Mayorga – Aurora
- Jonathan Moncada - Comunicaciones

=== Panama ===
- Felipe Baloy - Municipal
- José Calderón - Heredia, Deportivo Coatepeque, Comunicaciones
- Adolfo Machado - Marquense, Comunicaciones
- Jaime Penedo - Municipal
- Blas Perez - Municipal
- Johnny Ruiz - Marquense
- Álvaro Luis Salazar - Sanarate
- Edgardo Fariña - Municipal

=== Saint Kitts and Nevis ===
- Devaughn Elliott – Antigua – 2017

=== Trinidad and Tobago ===
- **Aubrey David** – Municipal – 2023–
- Darren Dwayn Melández - Guastatoya
- Dwane James - Antigua
- Jomal Williams - Achuapa
- Reon Moore - Municipal
- Mekeil Williams - Antigua
- Jamal Jack - Sacachispas
- Jerrel Britto - Malacateco

== South America (CONMEBOL) ==
=== Argentina ===
- Lucas Emanuel Acosta - Sanarate
- Ricardo Carreño - Xelajú, Municipal, Comunicaciones
- Fabián Castillo - Antigua, Sanarate
- Luis Carlos Contini - Comunicaciones
- Alejandro Diaz - Antigua, CSD Municipal
- Marcelo Ferreira
- Fernando Gallo - Juventud Retalteca, Peñarol
- Cristian Alexis Hernández - Sanarate, Comunicaciones
- Omar Larrosa - Comunicaciones
- Jorge Luis Lopez - Comunicaciones
- Juan Lovato - Petapa, Sanarate
- Alberto Ramírez
- Jorge Sotomayor - Coban Imperial
- Cristian Daniel Taborda - Sanarate
- Héctor Tambasco - Comunicaciones
- Marcelo Verón - Suchitepéquez
- Domingo Zalazar - Suchitepéquez

=== Bolivia ===
- Vladimir Castellón - Xelaju
- José Gabriel Ríos - Guastatoya

=== Brazil ===
- Juliano de Andrade - Marquense, Xelaju, Petapa
- Janderson Kione Pereira - Petapa, CSD Municipal, Coban Imperial
- Marcio Leandro Barbosa - Xelajú
- Roger Bastos Coitinho - Coban
- Evandro Ferreira - Heredia, Suchitepéquez
- Thiago Augusto Leite - Marquense
- Neto Mineiro - Marquense
- Terencio de Oliveira - Marquense
- Guilherme de Paula - Peñarol
- Rafael Da Roza - Santa Lucia
- Jurandir Dos Santos -
- Milton Queiroz “Tita” - Comunicaciones
- Sandro Zamboni - Petapa

=== Chile ===
- Wilfredo Barrientos - Juventud Católica (1974), Xelajú MC (1979–82)
- Claudio Chavarría - Heredia (2006)
- Carlos Díaz - Aurora (1974–75, 1978), Deportivo Zacapa (1976–77), Cobán Imperial (1979), Galcasa (1979)
- Fernando Espinosa - Tipografía Nacional (1978)
- Hernán Godoy - Comunicaciones (1968–69, 1971)
- Miguel Hermosilla - Municipal (1969)
- Mario Iubini - Comunicaciones (1977), Aurora (1978)
- Juan Koscina - Aurora (1981–82)
- Francisco Labraña - Xelajú MC, Deportivo Marquense, Suchitepéquez, Universidad SC, Tipografía Nacional
- Alejandro Maureira - Deportivo Zacapa (2007–08)
- Leonardo Monje - Municipal (2013)
- José Moris - Juventud Católica (1975)
- Fabián Muñoz - Deportivo Zacapa (2006, 2008–09), Comunicaciones (2007–08), Cobán Imperial (2009–10), Universidad SC (2010)
- Héctor Núñez - Cobán Imperial (2017)
- Hugo Ottensen - Cementos Novella (1973–74)
- Carlos Pacheco - Deportivo Zacapa (1977)
- Sergio Pardo - Aurora (197?), Deportivo Zacapa (197?), Universidad SC (197?), Juventud Retalteca (198?), Deportivo Pensamiento (1982)
- Efraín Santander - Municipal (1972–73, 1974), Juventud Católica (1973–74)
- Claudio Santis - Sacachispas (2022)
- Eduardo Soto
- Héctor Suazo - Deportivo Zacapa (2011–12)
- José Sulantay - Aurora (1970)
- Manuel Ulloa - Comunicaciones (197?), Suchitepéquez (197?)

=== Colombia ===
- Luis Carlos Asprilla - Petapa
- **José Corena** - Guastatoya, Comunicaciones
- William Zapata Brand - Xelajú, Sanarate
- Juan Camilo García - Xelajú
- Henry Javier Hernández - Juventud Retalteca, Heredia
- Juan David Osorio - Marquense, Antigua
- Roberto Carlos Peña - Antigua, Marquense, Malacateco, Coatepeque
- Yeison Daniel Pérez - Marquense
- Julio Andrés Valdez - Siquinala

=== Paraguay ===
- Lauro Ramón Cazal - Coban Imperial
- Carlos González - Municipal
- Carlos Leguizamón - Suchitepéquez
- Orlando Javier Moreira - Coban, CSD Municipal
- Joel Benítez - Comunicaciones FC
- Pedro Báez - Antigua, Malacateco, Xelaju
- Víctor Solalinde - Coban Imperial
- Milciades Portillo - CSD Municipal
- Juan Rubén López - Universidad San Carlos
- Jacinto Zorrilla - CSD Municipal
- Marcelo Ferreira - Guastatoya, Iztapa
- Víctor Avalos - Deportivo Guastatoya
- Rubén Escobar - Deportivo Guastatoya
- Roque Caballero - Mixco, Guastatoya
- Isidro Candía - Comunicaciones FC
- Walter Gaona - Santa Lucía Cotzumalguapa FC
- Manuel Romero - CSD Xelajú MC
- Milton Maciel - Antigua GFC
- Edgar Aguilera - CSD Municipal
- Miguel Ángel Acosta - Comunicaciones FC
- Julio Rodríguez - Mictlan, Aurora
- Hernán Torres - Universidad San Carlos
- Diego Alfonso - CSD Municipal
- Gustavo Colman - Deportivo Iztapa
- Jorge Armando Melgarejo - Comunicaciones

=== Peru ===
- Carlos Rivas - Comunicaciones
- Juan Diego Gutiérrez - Sololá FC
- Julio García - Sololá FC
- Martín Dall'Orso - Xelajú MC
- Raúl Tito - Marquense
- Jair Vásquez - Deportivo Zacapa

=== Uruguay ===
- Adrián Apellaniz - Comunicaciones
- Egidio Arévalo – Sacachispas – 2021–22
- Rodrigo Bengua - Mictlán
- José Luis Cardozo
- Jonathan Charquero - Coban Imperial
- Martín Crossa - Xelajú
- Rodrigo Cubilla - Petapa
- Darío Ferreira - Xelaju
- Ignacio Flores - Coban Imperial
- Matías Fracchia – Comunicaciones
- Álvaro Marcelo García - Xelajú, Coban Imperial, Guastatoya
- José Luis González
- Gonzalo Gutiérrez - Suchitepéquez
- Enzo Herrera - Malacateco
- Claudio Inella - Malacateco
- Cono Javier Irazún - Comunicaciones
- Adrián Elois Leites - Coban Imperial
- Gastón Linares - Heredia
- Bernardo Long - Xelaju
- Gonzalo Nicolás da Luz - Malacateco
- Santiago Ostolaza - Aurora
- Nestor Raul Pereira - Amatitlán
- Leonardo Gastón Puerari - Municipal
- Carlos Ramírez - Comunicaciones
- Jorge Rivaga
- Maximiliano Lombardi Rodríguez - Coban, Comunicaciones
- Hector Santos -
- Alberto Eiraldi Sellanes - Suchitepéquez
- Dario Silva - Sanarate
- Wilinton Techera - Mictlan, Malacateco, Siquinalá

=== Venezuela ===
- Charles Martinez - Suchitepequez
- Robinson Flores - Antigua
