= Bryan Danesi =

Chilean footballer (born 1989)

Personal information
- Full name: Bryan Ricardo Danesi Mora
- Date of birth: 6 May 1989 (age 37)
- Place of birth: Quilpué, Chile
- Height: 1.71 m (5 ft 7 in)
- Position: Midfielder

Youth career
- O'Higgins

Senior career*
Years	Team	Apps	(Gls)
2007–2012	O'Higgins	33	(4)
2009–2010	→ San Luis (loan)	20	(1)
2011–2012	→ Deportes Temuco (loan)	21	(2)
2013–2014	Deportes Concepción	18	(0)
2014–2015	Deportes Linares	9	(1)
2015–2016	Cobreloa	1	(0)
2016–2017	San Antonio Unido	25	(0)

International career
2008	Chile U18		
- * Club domestic league appearances and goals as of 11:02, 9 March 2020 (UTC)

Bryan Ricardo Danesi Mora (born 6 May 1989) is a Chilean former footballer. His last club was San Antonio Unido.

== Club career ==
=== O'Higgins ===
Danesi was promoted to adult team of O'Higgins in mid-2007. On 21 July, he scored his first professional goal against Everton de Viña del Mar in a 2–0 home win for Torneo Clausura's first matchday.

On 11 February 2008, during Torneo Apertura's fourth matchday, he scored his side's goal in a 1–2 away win over Cobreloa at Calama. He scored his second professional goal one month later in a 2–1 home win over Rangers de Talca on March 16. The next matchday he again scored his third goal in a 2–1 away defeat with Ñublense on 22 March.

=== San Luis de Quillota ===
In 2009, Danesi netted a goal for San Luis de Quillota during the Primera B de Chile promotion playoffs against Curicó Unido. Specifically, he scored in his side's 3–0 victory over Curicó Unido, which allowed Quillota–based side the promotion to 2010 Primera División de Chile.

=== Deportes Concepción ===
In 2013, he was signed by Deportes Concepción.

=== Deportes Linares ===
He scored his only one goal for Deportes Linares on 19 October 2014, in a 1–3 home defeat against Municipal Mejillones.

=== Cobreloa ===
On 29 June 2015, it was reported that Danesi would be the new playmaker of Cobreloa, signing which concreted in early June. He was officially presented on June 7 alongside Paulo Olivares, Enzo Guerrero, José Barrera, Manuel Simpertegui, Carlos Santibáñez, Boris Sandoval, Facundo Peraza from Uruguay and the four Argentinian players Nahuel Pansardi, Walter Gómez, Jorge De Olivera and Jorge Piris.

=== San Antonio Unido ===
On 10 September 2016, Danesi joined Segunda División de Chile (third-tier) side San Antonio Unido.

== International career ==
Along with Chile U18 he won the 2008 João Havelange Tournament.

== Honour ==
=== International ===
Chile U18

- João Havelange Tournament (1): 2008
