= Facundo Peraza =

Uruguayan footballer (born 1992)

Personal information
- Full name: Facundo Peraza Fontana
- Date of birth: 27 July 1992 (age 34)
- Place of birth: Canelones, Uruguay
- Height: 1.84 m (6 ft 0 in)
- Position: Forward

Team information
- Current team: Magallanes

Youth career
- Boston River

Senior career*
| Years | Team | Apps | (Gls) |
| 2012–2014 | Boston River | 41 | (8) |
| 2014 | Aucas | 8 | (0) |
| 2015 | Atenas | 20 | (8) |
| 2015–2016 | Cobreloa | 10 | (2) |
| 2015–2016 | Cerro | 39 | (8) |
| 2017–2018 | River Plate Montevideo | 27 | (0) |
| 2018 | Puerto Cabello | 15 | (0) |
| 2019 | Cerro | 26 | (4) |
| 2020 | Progreso | 23 | (2) |
| 2021 | Rentistas | 17 | (0) |
| 2022–2023 | UTC | 68 | (25) |
| 2024 | Al Urooba | | |
| 2024 | Uruguay Montevideo | 10 | (4) |
| 2025 | Cerro Largo | 19 | (1) |
| 2025– | Magallanes | 0 | (0) |
- * Club domestic league appearances and goals as of 19:13, 6 October 2022 (UTC)

Facundo Peraza Fontana (Note: In this Spanish name, the first or paternal surname is Peraza and the second or maternal family name is Fontana.) (born 27 July 1992) is a Uruguayan footballer who plays for Chilean club Magallanes.

== Club career ==
Born in Canelones, Uruguay, Peraza debuted for Boston River in a 1–1 draw against Huracán de Paso de la Arena for the 2012–13 Uruguayan Segunda División season.

On 7 June 2015 he was presented at Primera B de Chile (second-tier) side Cobreloa algonside other 11 players: the four Argentinian players Nahuel Pansardi, Walter Gómez, Jorge De Olivera and Jorge Piris and the seven Chilean players Bryan Danesi, Paulo Olivares, Enzo Guerrero, José Barrera, Manuel Simpertegui, Carlos Santibáñez, Boris Sandoval.

In the second half of 2025, Peraza returned to Chile and joined Magallanes.

== Personal life ==
Facundo is the older brother of the former professional footballer Agustín Peraza. Another family members who have played football or five-a-side football are Jorge, Gustavo, Horacio (brother of Gustavo) and Luca (son of Gustavo), all of them surnamed Peraza.
