= 2009 Campeonato Nacional Primera B =

Primera B de Chile
- Season: 2009 Primera B
- Champions: Unión San Felipe
- Promoted: Unión San Felipe; Santiago Wanderers; San Luis de Quillota
- Relegated: Deportes Melipilla

The Primera B de Chile season was the 59th completed season of the Primera B de Chile in the Chilean football league system.

== Torneo Apertura ==
Unión San Felipe was tournament’s champion.

Pos	Team	Pld	W	D	L	GF	GA	GD	Pts
1	Unión San Felipe	19	12	4	3	35	18	+17	40
2	Santiago Wanderers	19	9	6	4	33	19	+14	33
3	San Luis de Quillota	19	8	7	4	25	12	+13	31
4	Deportes Melipilla	19	8	6	5	30	28	+2	30
5	San Marcos de Arica	19	7	6	6	17	21	−4	27
6	Coquimbo Unido	19	7	5	7	21	20	+1	26
7	Lota Schwager	19	7	5	7	21	25	−4	26
8	Provincial Osorno	19	6	7	6	22	27	−5	25
9	Deportes Antofagasta	19	5	8	6	26	26	0	23
10	Naval	19	6	5	8	20	24	−4	23
11	Deportes Puerto Montt	19	5	5	9	26	30	−4	20
12	Unión La Calera	19	4	7	8	27	31	−4	19
13	Deportes Concepción	19	4	6	9	25	35	−10	18
14	Deportes Copiapó	19	4	5	10	12	24	−12	17

Source: RSSSF

== Torneo Clausura ==
San Luis de Quillota was tournament’s champion.

Pos	Team	Pld	W	D	L	GF	GA	GD	Pts
1	San Luis de Quillota	19	11	6	2	24	12	+12	39
2	Santiago Wanderers	19	10	8	1	29	12	+17	38
3	Unión San Felipe	19	11	4	4	33	15	+18	37
4	Deportes Antofagasta	19	8	4	7	25	30	−5	28
5	Deportes Concepción	19	7	5	7	29	22	+7	26
6	San Marcos de Arica	19	6	8	5	29	30	−1	26
7	Coquimbo Unido	19	6	7	6	28	31	−3	25
8	Provincial Osorno	19	6	6	7	35	32	+3	24
9	Deportes Puerto Montt	19	5	6	8	22	24	−2	21
10	Naval	19	4	9	6	16	26	−10	21
11	Unión La Calera	19	3	8	8	19	29	−10	17
12	Deportes Melipilla	19	8	4	7	35	30	+5	13 (Note: 15 points deducted)
13	Deportes Copiapó	19	3	4	12	15	30	−15	13
14	Lota Schwager	19	3	5	11	18	31	−13	8 (Note: 6 points deducted)

== Final of Champions ==
In order to determine the 2nd promoted team to Primera División, the two best teams from both Apertura and Clausura tournaments will face in a two-legged tie. The winning team will be promoted, while the losing team will qualify to the promotion play-offs.

As Apertura winners Unión San Felipe were already promoted due to the overall table (77 pts.), their spot was awarded to Santiago Wanderers, which were finished in 2nd place. San Luis de Quillota had their spot granted as Clausura winners.

4 November 2009
19:45
1st Leg

San Luis de Quillota	1–2	Santiago Wanderers
Zarosa 31'	Report	López 30'; Jiménez 64'

Estadio Sausalito, Viña del Mar
Attendance: 15,000
Referee: Jorge Osorio

8 November 2009
17:30
2nd Leg

Santiago Wanderers	1–1	San Luis de Quillota
Alfaro 4'	Report	Flores 65' (pen.)

Estadio Regional Chiledeportes, Valparaíso
Attendance: 16,587
Referee: Carlos Chandía

Santiago Wanderers won 3–2 on aggregate and were promoted to Primera División.

== Promotion play-offs ==
San Luis de Quillota, as losers of the Final of Champions, and San Marcos de Arica, 4th place of the overall table, faced Palestino and Curicó Unido, placed 15th and 16th in Primera División respectively, for the final two spots to the top-flight division. The play-offs were split into two draws involving a Primera Disivión team against a Primera B team, in two-legged ties.

=== Draw A ===
2 December 2009
19:00
1st Leg

San Luis de Quillota	1–2	Curicó Unido
Pierani 14'	Report	Albornoz 11', 48'

Estadio Ángel Navarrete Candía, Limache
Attendance: 2,500
Referee: Manuel Acosta

6 December 2009
17:00
2nd Leg

Curicó Unido	0–3	San Luis de Quillota
	Report	Alves Machado 50'; Flores 63' (pen.); Danesi 90+1'

Estadio Jorge Silva Valenzuela, San Fernando
Attendance: 6,000
Referee: Enrique Osses

San Luis de Quillota won 4–2 on aggregate and were promoted to Primera División. Curicó Unido were relegated to Primera B.

=== Draw B ===
2 December 2009
22:00
1st Leg

San Marcos de Arica	0–2	Palestino
	Report	Pereira 7'; Ibáñez 62'

Estadio Carlos Dittborn, Arica
Attendance: 13,000
Referee: Patricio Polic

6 December 2009
19:10
2nd Leg

Palestino	0–2 (a.e.t.)	San Marcos de Arica
	Report	Gálvez 73'; Celedón 78'
Penalties
Olea (penalty scored); Riquelme (penalty scored); Ibáñez (penalty scored); Pavez (penalty scored)	4–2	(penalty missed) Montecinos; (penalty scored) A. González; (penalty scored) Pérez; (penalty missed) V. González

Estadio Monumental, Santiago
Attendance: 2,873
Referee: Claudio Puga

2–2 on aggregate. Palestino won 4–2 on penalties and remain in Primera División. San Marcos de Arica remain in Primera B.
