= Frank Schulz =

Frank Schulz may refer to:

- Frank Schulz (footballer, born 1961), German footballer
- Frank Schulze (born 1970), German footballer
- Frank F. Schulz (1863–1941), American politician from New York

== See also ==
- Franz Schultz (born 1991), Chilean footballer
