= Ramon Perez =

Ramon Perez may refer to:

- Ramón Pérez de Ayala (1880-1962), Spanish writer
- Ramon Perez Blackburn (1927-2018), American entertainer
- Ramón Pérez (footballer) (born 1963), Chilean footballer
- Ramon Perez (politician) (born 1971), American politician
- Ramón Pérez, comics artist who worked on Jim Henson's Tale of Sand

== See also ==
- Esteban Ramón Pérez (born 1989), American artist
