= Nibaldo Alegre =

Chilean footballer

Personal information
- Full name: Nibaldo Antonio Alegre González
- Date of birth: 17 July 1945 (age 81)
- Place of birth: Talca, Chile
- Positions: Defensive midfielder; centre-back

Youth career
- Bohemios del Sur
- Talca National
- Deportivo Calaf
- 1964: Santiago Wanderers

Senior career*
Years	Team	Apps	(Gls)
1965–1970	Santiago Wanderers		
1969	→ Unión La Calera (loan)	16	(1)
1971	Naval de Talcahuano		
1973	Iberia de Los Ángeles		
1974	The Miner's Japo		
1975	San José de Trinidad		
1976	Universitario de Trinidad		
1977	20 de Agosto		
- * Club domestic league appearances and goals

Nibaldo Antonio Alegre González (born 17 July 1945) is a Chilean former football player who played as a defensive midfielder or centre-back for clubs in Chile and Bolivia.

== Club career ==
Born in Talca, Chile, Alegre was with Bohemios del Sur, Talca National, with whom he won the local youth championship, and Deportivo Calaf in his hometown before joining the Santiago Wanderers reserve team in 1964. The next year, he made his professional debut in a Chilean Primera División match against Green-Cross Temuco. As a member of them, he won the 1968 league title, the second one for the club.

In 1969, he joined Unión La Calera on loan, making sixteen appearances.

For the 1970 season, he returned to Santiago Wanderers. In his career with them, he coincided with well-known players such as Elías Figueroa, Eugenio Méndez, Vicente Cantatore, among others.

The next two years, he played for Naval de Talcahuano (1971) and Iberia de Los Ángeles (1972).

In 1974, he emigrated to Bolivia and played for four teams: The Miner's Japo from Oruro, coinciding with his compatriot Alfredo Carrasco, San José, Universitario and 20 de Agosto from Trinidad.

== Personal life ==
His brother, César, also played for Santiago Wanderers. His other brothers also played for Talca National.

Alegre made his home in Valparaíso, Chile, where he owns a bakery.

In August 2023, he was honored as a historical player of Santiago Wanderers alongside another former players such as Juan Álvarez, Hernán Godoy and Manuel Ulloa, by the Corporación Santiago Wanderers.

== Honours ==
Santiago Wanderers

- Chilean Primera División: 1968
