= Claudio Álvarez =

Chilean footballer (born 1967)

Personal information
- Full name: Claudio Andrés Álvarez González
- Date of birth: 19 April 1967 (age 59)
- Place of birth: Viña del Mar, Chile
- Position: Striker

Youth career
- Santiago Wanderers

Senior career*
Years	Team	Apps	(Gls)
1985–1990	Santiago Wanderers		
1986	→ Defensor Casablanca (loan)	–	(–)
1987	→ Ferroviarios (loan)	–	(–)
1990	→ Unión San Felipe (loan)		(5)
1991	Unión Española	1	(1)
1991	FC Baden		
1991	Deportes Puerto Montt		(4)
1992	Cobresal	27	(10)
1993	Deportes Antofagasta		
1993–1994	Deportes La Serena	17	(3)
1994	Deportes Puerto Montt	3	(0)
1994	Provincial Osorno	18	(5)
1995	Santiago Wanderers	12	(2)
1996	Unión Santa Cruz	7	(1)
- * Club domestic league appearances and goals

Claudio Andrés Álvarez González (born 19 April 1967) is a Chilean former footballer who played as a striker. Besides Chile, he played in Switzerland.

== Career ==
A forward from the Santiago Wanderers youth system, Álvarez began his career with them in the Chilean second division and after he was with Defensor Casablanca and Ferroviarios in the third level.

In the Chilean top division, Álvarez played for Unión Española, Cobresal, Deportes La Serena and Provincial Osorno. He also made appearances for Deportes Antofagasta in the 1993 Copa Chile.

In the second division, he also played for Unión San Felipe, Deportes Puerto Montt and Unión Santa Cruz. With Santiago Wanderers, he got three promotions to the top level in 1985, 1989 and 1995, winning the league title in the last.

In 1991, he had a stint with Swiss side FC Baden, alongside his compatriots Eduardo Soto and Ramón Pérez.

== Personal life ==
He is nicknamed Tanque (Tank), as his father Juan Álvarez, a former footballer and historical player of Santiago Wanderers.

He has worked as a football coach for children in his city of birth in a municipal project called Casa del Deporte (Sports Place) alongside former footballers such as Luis Alberto Lufi and Juan Carlos Ceballos.
