= Manuel Ulloa =

Chilean footballer

Personal information
- Full name: Manuel Segundo Ulloa Ravanales
- Date of birth: 28 February 1945 (age 81)
- Place of birth: Valparaíso, Chile
- Position: Centre-back

Youth career
- Caupolicán
- Deportivo Playa Ancha

Senior career*
Years	Team	Apps	(Gls)
1967–1971	Santiago Wanderers	126	(0)
1972–1977	Rangers	184	(3)
- Comunicaciones
- Suchitepéquez
- Houston Hurricane

International career
1966	Chile (amateur)		
- * Club domestic league appearances and goals

Manuel Segundo Ulloa Ravanales (born 28 February 1945) is a Chilean former footballer who played as a centre-back for clubs in Chile and abroad.

== Career ==
Born in Valparaíso, Chile, as a youth player Ulloa was with both Club Caupolicán and Deportivo Playa Ancha in his hometown.

At professional level, he spent eleven seasons in the Chilean football playing for two teams at the top division: Santiago Wanderers (1967–71) and Rangers de Talca (1972–77).

Ulloa made his professional debut with Santiago Wanderers in the match against Unión San Felipe on 9 April 1967 and was considered the replaicing player of Elías Figueroa after his retirement. He was an important member of the squad that won the 1968 league title, the second one for the club, alongside teammates such as Juan Álvarez, Vicente Cantatore, Nibaldo Alegre, among others, a team known as The Panzers.

In the late 1970s, he moved to Guatemala and played for Comunicaciones and Suchitepéquez.

His last club was Houston Hurricane in the United States.

== International career ==
Ulloa represented Chile at the 1966 Juegos PE-CHI in Peru.

== Personal life ==
Ulloa is nicknamed Profesor (Teacher).

He has served as secretary of "Los Panzers 1968", a group of players from the 1968 season that cooperates with the Santiago Wanderers Corporation.

In August 2023, he was honored as a historical player of Santiago Wanderers alongside another former players by the Santiago Wanderers Corporation.
