= Patricio Jerez (footballer, born 1987) =

Chilean footballer

Personal information
- Full name: Patricio Felipe Jerez Aguayo
- Date of birth: 29 June 1987 (age 39)
- Place of birth: Concepción, Chile
- Height: 1.80 m (5 ft 11 in)
- Position: Right-back

Youth career
- Huachipato

Senior career*
Years	Team	Apps	(Gls)
2006–2007	Huachipato B		
2007	Huachipato		
2008	Deportes Valdivia		
2009	Trasandino		
2010	Iberia		
2011–2012	Deportes Concepción	43	(1)
2011–2017	Cobresal	134	(3)
2018–2021	Deportes Temuco	10	(0)
2019	→ Deportes Valdivia (loan)	10	(0)
2021–2022	Fernández Vial	34	(1)
- * Club domestic league appearances and goals as of 20 November 2023

Patricio Felipe Jerez Aguayo (born 29 June 1987) is a Chilean footballer who plays as a right-back. He last played for Fernández Vial.

== Career ==
In May 2021, he joined Fernández Vial in the Primera B de Chile.

At international level, he was part of a Chile under-25 squad in a training session led by Claudio Borghi in May 2011, alongside his teammates in Deportes Concepción, David Llanos and Manuel Simpertegui.

== Honours ==
Cobresal

- Primera División (1): 2015 Clausura
