= Eduardo Soto (footballer, born 1965) =

Chilean footballer and manager (born 1965)

Personal information
- Full name: Eduardo Óscar Soto Ortiz
- Date of birth: February 20, 1965 (age 61)
- Place of birth: Santiago, Chile
- Position: Centre back

Youth career
- Universidad Católica

Senior career*
Years	Team	Apps	(Gls)
1983–1985	Súper Lo Miranda		
1986	Everton	25	(1)
1987-1988	Regional Atacama		
1989–1990	Unión San Felipe	25	(0)
1990–1991	Regional Atacama		
1991–1992	FC Baden	9	(0)
1993	Deportes La Serena	28	(0)
1994	O'Higgins	19	(0)
1994–1995	América	14	(0)
1995	Palestino	13	(1)
1996–1997	Audax Italiano	49	(1)
1998	Deportes La Serena	16	(0)
1999	Unión Española	8	(0)

Managerial career
- 2004–2005: Audax Italiano (assistant)
- 2007: Deportes Valdivia
- 2008–2009: Deportes Valdivia
- 2010–2011: O'Higgins (assistant)
- 2012: Unión Molina
- 2013: Colchagua
- * Club domestic league appearances and goals

Eduardo Óscar Soto Ortiz (born 20 February 1965) is a Chilean football manager and former footballer who played as a Centre back for clubs in Chile and abroad.

== Playing career ==
Soto is a product of Universidad Católica youth system, where he coincided with players such as Carlos Soto, Luis Abarca and Mario Lepe.

With an extensive career in his homeland, he began his career with Súper Lo Miranda and next he played for Regional Atacama Everton, Unión San Felipe, Deportes La Serena, O'Higgins, Palestino Audax Italiano and Unión Española.

Abroad, he played in Switzerland for FC Baden in the second level alongside his compatriots Claudio Álvarez and Ramón Pérez, América in Mexico, where he coincided with well-known players such as François Omam-Biyik and Luis García, and in the Guatemalan football.

== Coaching career ==
In 2005 he graduated as a football manager at the INAF (National Football Institute) alongside former players such as Fernando Astengo, José Cantillana, Eduardo Nazar, among others.

He has worked as assistant coach in both Audax Italiano and O'Higgins. As a head coach, he has worked for Deportes Valdivia and Unión Molina in the third and the fifth level of the Chilean football, respectively.

He also has served as coach at the INAF (National Football Institute), the trade union of professional footballers of Chile, and coaches youth teams from Caja de Compensación La Araucana since 2014.

== Honours ==
Unión Española

- Primera B de Chile: 1999
