= David Portillo =

Paraguayan footballer (born 1984)

José David Portillo
Personal information
- Full name: José David Portillo
- Date of birth: 24 November 1984 (age 41)
- Place of birth: San Juan Bautista, Paraguay
- Height: 1.83 m (6 ft 0 in)
- Position: Centre-back

Senior career*
Years	Team	Apps	(Gls)
2003–2006	Olimpia		
2007	Sportivo Trinidense		
2008–2014	Deportes Antofagasta	189	(6)
2013–2014	→ Deportes Copiapó (loan)	35	(1)
2014–2017	Deportes Copiapó	104	(6)
2018	Cobresal	16	(2)

Managerial career
- 2023: Sportivo Obrero
- * Club domestic league appearances and goals

José David Portillo (born 24 November 1984) is a former Paraguayan footballer who played as a centre-back.

== Career ==
A centre-back from Olimpia, Portillo made his debut with them in 2003. In 2007, he had a stint with Sportivo Trinidense.

In 2008, Portillo moved to Chile and spent five seasons with Deportes Antofagasta. In 2013, he switched to Deportes Copiapó.

In 2018, he moved to Cobresal.

In 2023, he served as coach of Club Sportivo Obrero from his city of birth.

== Personal life ==
Portillo is the maternal half-brother of the Paraguay international Gustavo Gómez.

== Honours ==
=== Player ===
Deportes Antofagasta

- Primera B: 2011
