= Ramón Pérez (footballer) =

Chilean footballer (born 1963)

Personal information
- Full name: Ramón Osvaldo Pérez Araya
- Date of birth: June 28, 1963 (age 63)
- Place of birth: Santiago, Chile
- Height: 1.74 m (5 ft 9 in)
- Position: Forward

Youth career
- Unión Española

Senior career*
Years	Team	Apps	(Gls)
1979–1987	Unión Española	122	(35)
1984	→ Rangers (loan)	23	(8)
1987	Everton	21	(6)
1988–1989	Palestino	34	(13)
1989–1992	AC Bellinzona	15	(7)
1991–1992	→ FC Baden (loan)	11	(1)
1992–1993	Cobreloa	40	(6)
1994	Palestino	13	(0)
1995	Deportes Concepción	18	(0)
1996	Deportes Linares	11	(6)
1997	Magallanes	3	(0)
Total		311	(85)

International career
1988–1989	Chile	4	(0)
- * Club domestic league appearances and goals

Ramón Osvaldo Pérez Araya (born 28 June 1963) is a Chilean former footballer who played as a forward for clubs in Chile and Switzerland.

== Club career ==
A product of Unión Española youth system, Pérez also played for Rangers de Talca, Everton, Palestino, Cobreloa, with whom he won the league title in 1992, Deportes Concepción, Deportes Linares and Magallanes in his homeland.

Abroad, he played in Switzerland for both AC Bellinzona and FC Baden (loan). In FC Baden, he coincided with his compatriots Eduardo Soto and Claudio Álvarez.

== International career ==
Pérez made four appearances for the Chile senior team from 1988 to 1989.

== Personal life ==
He is better known by his nickname Peraca.

He has worked as a taxi driver.

In 2018, he involved in a quarrel in the Club Hípico de Santiago and got shot in the right leg while he tried to help a cousin.
