= Carlos Díaz (footballer, born 1945) =

Chilean footballer

Personal information
- Full name: Carlos Guillermo Díaz López
- Date of birth: 27 June 1945 (age 81)
- Place of birth: Santiago, Chile
- Position: Midfielder

Youth career
- Club México
- 1961–1965: Ferrobádminton

Senior career*
Years	Team	Apps	(Gls)
1966	Ferrobádminton	22	(1)
1967–1970	Rangers	133	(20)
1971	Colo-Colo	23	(5)
1972–1973	Naval	53	(6)
1974–1975	Aurora		
1976–1977	Deportivo Zacapa		
1978	Aurora		
1979	Cobán Imperial		
1979	Galcasa		
1980	Universidad SC		
- * Club domestic league appearances and goals

Carlos Guillermo Díaz López (born 27 June 1945) is a Chilean former footballer who played as a midfielder for clubs in Chile and Guatemala.

== Career ==
A versatile midfielder, Díaz is a product of Ferrobádminton, the club after Bádminton FC, and made his debut in the 1966 season wearing the number 6 in a match against Audax Italiano. In his homeland, he also played for Rangers, Colo-Colo and Naval, only in the top division.

He was a member of the Rangers squad that became the runner-up in the 1969 season, won the Torneo Provincial and qualified to the 1970 Copa Libertadores. In the tournament, Díaz scored against Deportivo Cali and Universidad de Chile. The next year, he also took part in the Copa Libertadores with Colo-Colo.

After the 1973 Chilean coup d'état, he emigrated to Guatemala and played for Aurora, Deportivo Zacapa, Cobán Imperial, Galcasa and Universidad SC. He won league titles with Aurora in 1975 and 1978. In Deportivo Zacapa, he coincided with his compatriot Carlos Pacheco.

At international level, he was called up to the Chile national team in 1972 for a tournament in Brazil. However, Rangers did not give him permission.

== Personal life ==
He was nicknamed Carita de Toni (Little Clown Face) since he was a child due to his sense of humour.
