= Bernardo Long =

Uruguayan footballer (born 1989)

Personal information
- Full name: Bernardo Enzo Long Baccino
- Date of birth: 27 September 1989 (age 37)
- Place of birth: Colonia Valdense, Uruguay
- Height: 1.82 m (6 ft 0 in)
- Position: Goalkeeper

Senior career*
Years	Team	Apps	(Gls)
2010–2015	Rampla Juniors	69	(0)
2015	→ S.D. Quito (loan)	9	(0)
2016	Lincoln Red Imps		
2016–2017	C.D. Guastatoya	46	(0)
2017	Racing Club de Montevideo	10	(0)
2018	Rentistas	13	(0)
2018	Xelajú MC	22	(0)
2019	Rentistas	26	(0)
2020–2021	Defensor Sporting	15	(0)
2022	Rampla Juniors	11	(0)
2022	Atenas	1	(0)
- * Club domestic league appearances and goals

Bernardo Enzo Long Baccino (born September 27, 1989 in Colonia, Uruguay) is an Uruguayan footballer.
