= Miguel Ángel Cuéllar =

Paraguayan footballer (born 1982)

Personal information
- Date of birth: 25 September 1982 (age 44)
- Place of birth: Saltos del Guaira, Paraguay
- Height: 1.82 m (6 ft 0 in)
- Position: Striker

Senior career*
Years	Team	Apps	(Gls)
2004–2005	Sportivo Luqueño	8	(0)
2005	12 de Octubre	0	(0)
2006	Bolívar	31	(11)
2007	CFR Cluj	2	(0)
2007	Sol de América	19	(5)
2008	Tigre	0	(0)
2009	Oriente Petrolero	21	(4)
2010	3 de Febrero	19	(7)
2010	Deportivo Pereira	11	(1)
2011–2012	Cobresal	60	(26)
2013	Cobreloa	15	(4)
2014	Deportes La Serena	14	(3)
2014	Rubio Ñu	7	(0)
2015	San José	11	(2)
Total		218	(63)
- * Club domestic league appearances and goals as of 27 March 2018

Miguel Ángel Cuéllar (born 25 September 1982) is a retired Paraguayan footballer who played as a striker. He had a short spell in Europe when he was transferred alongside teammate André Galiassi from Bolívar to CFR Cluj in Romania.

== Honours ==
Bolívar

- Bolivian Primera División: 2005–06 Clausura
