= Luis Salmerón =

Argentine footballer

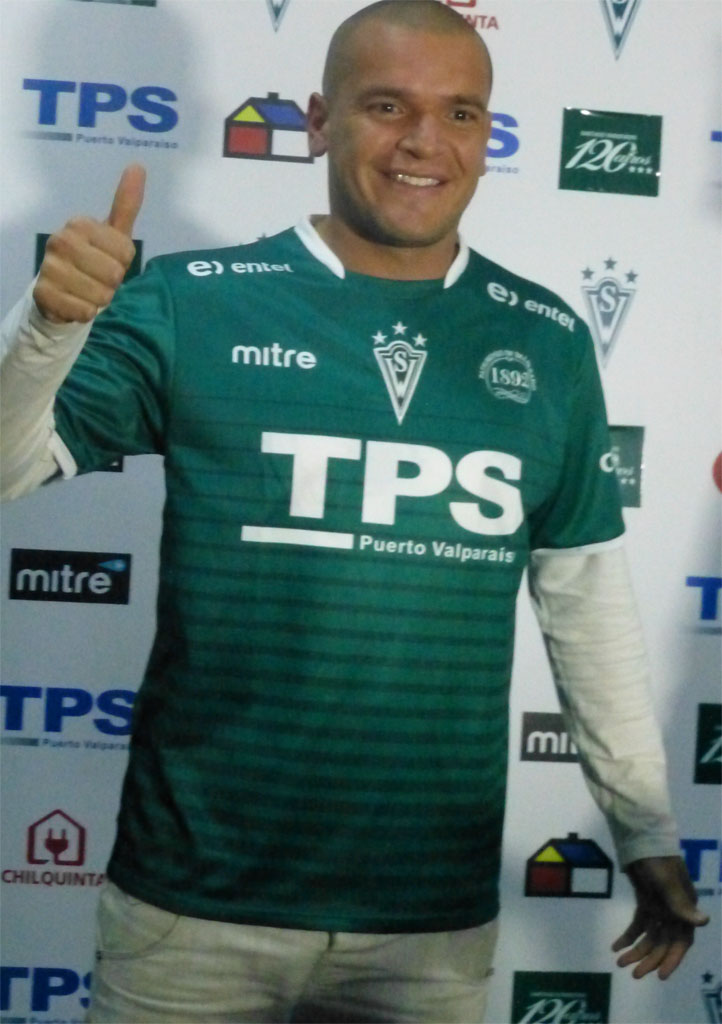
- Salmerón with Santiago Wanderers in 2012

Personal information
- Full name: Luis Ángel Salmerón
- Date of birth: 18 March 1982 (age 44)
- Place of birth: Córdoba, Argentina
- Height: 1.85 m (6 ft 1 in)
- Position: Forward

Youth career
- Ferro Carril Oeste

Senior career*
Years	Team	Apps	(Gls)
1999–2003	Ferro Carril Oeste	78	(9)
2000–2001	→ Deportivo Armenio (loan)	24	(3)
2003–2004	Atlanta	6	(5)
2006–2007	Tigre	37	(2)
2007–2008	Ferro Carril Oeste	76	(29)
2008–2014	Talleres de Córdoba	43	(18)
2009–2010	→ Banfield (loan)	15	(0)
2010–2011	→ Independiente Rivadavia (loan)	16	(6)
2011–2012	→ Shanghai Shenhua (loan)	24	(12)
2012	→ Ferro Carril Oeste (loan)	18	(4)
2012–2013	→ Santiago Wanderers (loan)	26	(4)
2014	→ Atlético Venezuela (loan)	12	(5)
2014–2017	Ferro Carril Oeste	109	(29)
2017–2019	Tristán Suárez	60	(21)
2020	Los Andes	5	(0)
- * Club domestic league appearances and goals

Luis Ángel Salmerón (Spanish pronunciation: [ˈlwis salmeˈɾon]; born March 18, 1982, in Córdoba, Argentina) is a retired Argentine footballer, who played as a forward.

== Club career ==
Salmerón began playing for Ferro Carril Oeste in 2000. He spent several years playing lower league football with the likes of Deportivo Armenio, Atlanta, Tigre and Talleres de Córdoba before joining Primera División side Banfield in 2009.

He was a bit part player in the Apertura 2009 championship appearing in 4 games. On 13 December 2009 he celebrated with his teammates when Banfield won the Argentine championship for the first time in the history of the club.

In 2010, after a scoreless season in Banfield, Salmerón joined Independiente Rivadavia in the second division.

He moved to China and signed with Shanghai Shenhua in January 2011.

His last club was Los Andes in 2020.

== Coaching career ==
Following his retirement, Salmerón served as a coach for the Ferro Carril Oeste youth ranks for about three years. He returned to them in April 2026.

== Honours ==
Banfield

- Primera División Argentina: Apertura 2009
