= Carlos Pacheco (footballer) =

Chilean footballer

Personal information
- Full name: Carlos Gilberto Pacheco Cajas
- Date of birth: 21 December 1942
- Place of birth: Valparaíso, Chile
- Date of death: 22 November 2021 (aged 78)
- Place of death: Valparaíso, Chile
- Height: 1.77 m (5 ft 10 in)
- Position: Midfielder

Youth career
- Yelcho
- 1960–1962: Everton

Senior career*
Years	Team	Apps	(Gls)
1963–1966	Everton	39	(2)
1967–1971	Unión Española	111	(7)
1972	Naval	25	(1)
1973	Palestino	3	(0)
1973	Bolívar		
1974	Magallanes	13	(0)
1975	Santa Fe	1	(0)
1976	Deportivo Zacapa		

International career
1963	Chile B		
1971–1972	Chile	10	(1)
- * Club domestic league appearances and goals

Carlos Gilberto Pacheco Cajas (21 December 1942 – 22 November 2021) was a Chilean football player who played as a midfielder for clubs in Chile and abroad and the Chile national team.

== Club career ==
Born in Valparaíso, Chile, Pacheco was with Club Deportivo Yelcho from Las Zorras neighbourhood before joining the Everton youth system in 1960.

After playing for Everton until 1966, he switched to Unión Española, becoming the team captain alongside well known players such as Leonardo Véliz, Francisco Valdés, Juan Rodríguez Vega, among others. In total, he made one hundred thirty nine appearances and scored seven goals for them until the 1971 season.

In his homeland, he also played for Naval de Talcahuano (1972), Palestino (1973) and Magallanes (1974).

Abroad, he had stints with Bolívar (1974) in Bolivia, where he coincided with his compatriot Esteban Varas, Independiente Santa Fe in Colombia and Deportivo Zacapa in Guatemala, where he coincided with his compatriot Carlos Díaz.

== International career ==
Pacheco was called up to the Chile B squad by the coach Francisco Hormazábal with views to the 1966 World Cup qualifiers.

Pacheco made ten appearances for the Chile national team and scored a goal against Uruguay on 3 November 1971. As a member of them, he won both the Copa del Pacífico and the Copa Juan Pinto Durán in 1971.

== Personal life ==
As a student, he attended both the Agustín Edwards school in Valparaíso and La Gratitud Nacional in Santiago.
