= Jefferson Castillo =

Chilean footballer (born 1990)

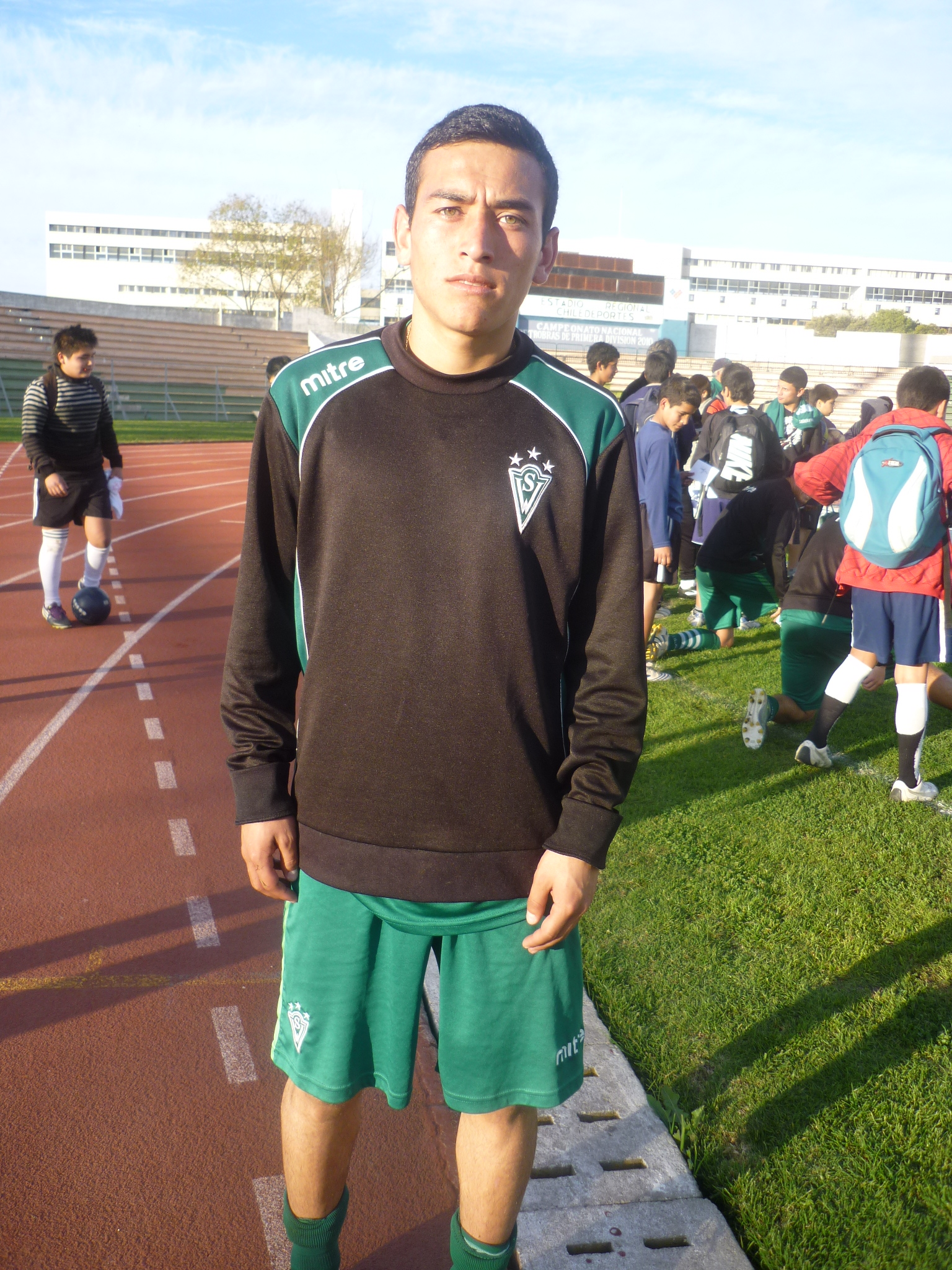
- Castillo with Santiago Wanderers in 2010

Personal information
- Full name: Jefferson Alexis Castillo Marin
- Date of birth: 10 June 1990 (age 36)
- Place of birth: Valparaíso, Chile
- Height: 1.62 m (5 ft 4 in)
- Position: Midfielder

Youth career
- Águilas del Valle
- Santiago Wanderers

Senior career*
Years	Team	Apps	(Gls)
2009–2016	Santiago Wanderers	60	(4)
2014	→ Curicó Unido (loan)	17	(3)
2015	→ Deportes Puerto Montt (loan)	23	(2)
2016	→ Rangers (loan)	8	(0)
2017	→ Deportes Puerto Montt (loan)	12	(2)
2017–2019	Deportes Copiapó	61	(7)
2020–2021	Santiago Morning	43	(3)
2022	Santiago Wanderers	30	(4)
2023	Deportes Puerto Montt	19	(0)
2024	Concón National	12	(1)
Total		285	(26)

International career
2011	Chile U20		
- * Club domestic league appearances and goals

Jefferson Alexis Castillo Marín (born 10 June 1990) is a Chilean former footballer who played as a midfielder.

He officially retired in 2025.
