= Sebastián Rusculleda =

Argentine footballer

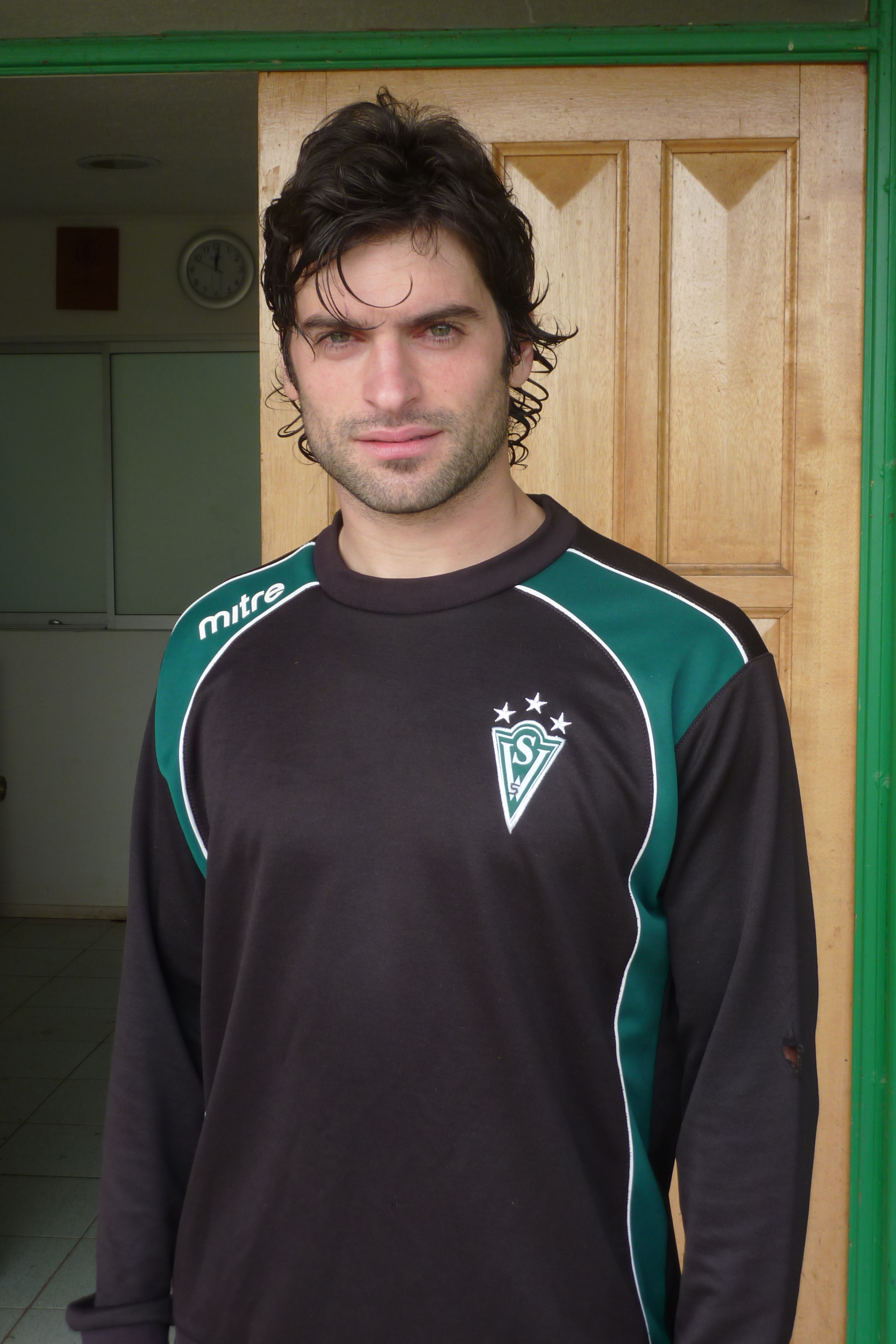
- Rusculleda with Santiago Wanderers in 2011

Personal information
- Full name: Sebastián Rusculleda
- Date of birth: April 28, 1985 (age 41)
- Place of birth: Laboulaye, Argentina
- Height: 1.75 m (5 ft 9 in)
- Position: Left winger

Youth career
- Boca Juniors

Senior career*
Years	Team	Apps	(Gls)
2004–2006	Boca Juniors	0	(0)
2004–2005	→ Ajax (loan)	0	(0)
2006–2007	Quilmes	17	(3)
2007–2009	Tigre	55	(2)
2009–2010	Al-Ahli	1	(0)
2010–2011	San Lorenzo	10	(0)
2011–2012	Santiago Wanderers	19	(3)
2012–2013	Deportivo Quito	14	(0)
2013–2014	Tigre	5	(0)
2015–2016	Panetolikos	31	(1)
2016–2017	San Martín SJ	9	(0)
2017	Defensores de Belgrano	4	(0)
2018	PS Kemi	7	(0)
2021	Deportivo Merlo	2	(0)

Managerial career
- 2022–2023: Cañuelas (assistant)
- 2023: Aldosivi (assistant)
- 2024: Huracán (reserves) (assistant)
- * Club domestic league appearances and goals

Sebastián Rusculleda (born 28 April 1985 in Laboulaye, Córdoba) is an Argentine former footballer who played as a left winger.

== Club career ==
Rusculleda started his football career in the Boca Juniors youth team, he spent some time at Ajax in the Netherlands before returning to Boca. In 2006, he joined Quilmes but after a disastrous 2006-2007 season the club was relegated from the Argentine Primera.

Rusculleda then joined Tigre where he established himself as an important member of the team that finished 2nd in the Apertura 2007, Tigre's highest ever league position. He signed for Al-Ahli in July 2009. On 2 January 2010 CA San Lorenzo have signed the left winger from Al-Ahli Jeddah.

On 12 January 2015, Rusculleda signed a 1.5-year contract with Greek club Panetolikos F.C.

His last club was Deportivo Merlo in 2021.

== Coaching career ==
Rusculleda has served as assistant coach in Cañuelas, Aldosivi and Huracán (reserves).
