= Sebastián Ubilla =

Chilean footballer (born 1990)

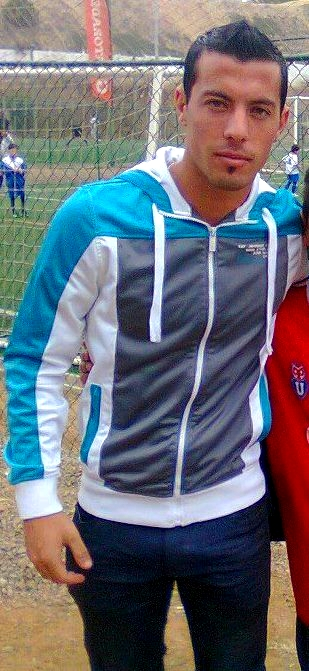
- Ubilla with Universidad de Chile in 2013

Personal information
- Full name: Sebastián Andrés Ubilla Cambón
- Date of birth: August 9, 1990 (age 36)
- Place of birth: Quilpué, Chile
- Height: 1.72 m (5 ft 8 in)
- Position: Forward

Youth career
- Colo-Colo Quilpué
- Pedro Montt Quilpué
- Colo-Colo
- 2003–2008: Santiago Wanderers

Senior career*
Years	Team	Apps	(Gls)
2008–2012	Santiago Wanderers	103	(23)
2012–2017	Universidad de Chile	104	(38)
2018	Al Shabab	6	(2)
2018–2019	Universidad de Chile	28	(4)
2020–2021	Santiago Wanderers	46	(8)
2022	O'Higgins	13	(0)
2023–2024	Deportes Antofagasta	48	(6)
2025	Concón National	11	(5)

International career^{‡}
2011–2013	Chile	2	(0)
- * Club domestic league appearances and goals as of 25 March 2026 ‡ National team caps and goals as of 19 January 2013

Sebastián Andrés Ubilla Cambón (born August 9, 1990) is a Chilean footballer who plays as a forward.

== Career ==
On 2 July 2025, Ubilla joined Concón National in the Segunda División Profesional de Chile.

== Career statistics ==
As of 27 August 2022.

Club statistics
Club	Division	League			Cup		Continental		Total	
Club	Division	Season	Apps	Goals	Apps	Goals	Apps	Goals	Apps	Goals
Santiago Wanderers	Primera B de Chile	2008	9	0	1	0	—		10	0
Santiago Wanderers	Primera B de Chile	2009	18	3	—		—		18	3
Santiago Wanderers	Chilean Primera División	2010	28	2	1	0	—		29	2
Santiago Wanderers	Chilean Primera División	2011	33	7	5	0	—		38	5
Santiago Wanderers	Chilean Primera División	2012	15	11	—		—		15	11
Santiago Wanderers	Chilean Primera División	2020	31	7	—		—		31	7
Santiago Wanderers	Chilean Primera División	2021	15	1	5	0	—		20	1
Santiago Wanderers	Total		149	31	12	0	0	0	161	31
Universidad de Chile	Chilean Primera División	2012	10	4	6	1	8	1	24	6
Universidad de Chile	Chilean Primera División	2013	10	6	—		5	2	15	8
Universidad de Chile	Chilean Primera División	2013–14	13	3	1	0	3	0	17	3
Universidad de Chile	Chilean Primera División	2014–15	23	10	4	3	6	2	33	15
Universidad de Chile	Chilean Primera División	2015–16	27	8	11	1	1	0	39	9
Universidad de Chile	Chilean Primera División	2016–17	9	2	—		2	0	11	2
Universidad de Chile	Chilean Primera División	2017	12	5	6	1	—		18	6
Universidad de Chile	Chilean Primera División	2018	7	2	2	0	—		9	2
Universidad de Chile	Chilean Primera División	2019	21	2	5	0	2	0	28	2
Universidad de Chile	Total		132	42	35	6	27	5	194	53
Al Shabab	Saudi Pro League	2017–18	6	2	1	1	—		7	3
O'Higgins	Chilean Primera División	2022	18	0	4	0	—		22	0
C.D. Antofagasta	Primera B de Chile	2023	27	3	0	0	—		27	3
C.D. Antofagasta	Primera B de Chile	2024	18	2	1	1	—		19	3
C.D. Antofagasta	Total		45	5	1	1	0	0	46	6
Career total			350	80	53	8	27	5	430	93

== Honours ==
Universidad de Chile

- Copa Chile (2): 2012–13, 2015
- Chilean Primera División (2): 2014 Apertura, 2017 Clausura
- Supercopa de Chile (1): 2015
