= David Llanos =

Chilean footballer (born 1989)

Personal information
- Full name: David Antonio Llanos Almonacid
- Date of birth: 27 July 1989 (age 37)
- Place of birth: Talcahuano, Chile
- Height: 1.73 m (5 ft 8 in)
- Position: Forward

Youth career
- 2006–2009: Huachipato

Senior career*
Years	Team	Apps	(Gls)
2006–2014	Huachipato	82	(21)
2010–2011	→ Deportes Concepción (loan)	56	(15)
2012	→ Palestino (loan)	16	(1)
2012	→ Rangers (loan)	15	(7)
2014–2018	Universidad Católica	81	(26)
2019	Unión Española	7	(0)
2020	Deportes La Serena	5	(0)
2021	Unión San Felipe	10	(1)
2022	Deportes Santa Cruz	7	(0)
2023	Fernández Vial	2	(0)
Total		281	(71)

International career
2007	Chile U17		
2008	Chile U23	2	(1)
2009	Chile U20	4	(0)
2009	Chile U21	2	(0)
- * Club domestic league appearances and goals

David Antonio Llanos Almonacid (born 27 July 1989) is a Chilean former footballer who played as a forward.

== Club career ==
Llanos was trained at Huachipato and made his professional debut in 2006.

His last club was Fernández Vial in the 2023 Segunda División Profesional de Chile. It was confirmed his retirement two years later.

== International career ==
In 2008, Llanos represented Chile U23 at the 2008 Inter Continental Cup in Malaysia, scoring a goal. The next year, along with Chile U21 he won the 2009 Toulon Tournament and represented Chile U20 at the 2009 South American U-20 Championship.

He also was part of a Chile under-25 squad in a training session led by Claudio Borghi in May 2011, alongside his teammates in Deportes Concepción, Patricio Jerez and Manuel Simpertegui.

== Honors ==
Universidad Católica

- Primera División de Chile (3): 2016–C, 2016–A, 2018
- Supercopa de Chile (1): 2016

Chile U21

- Toulon Tournament (1): 2009
