= Sebastián Méndez (footballer) =

Chilean footballer (born 1986)

Sebastián Antonio Méndez Plaza (born 6 June 1986 in Quilpué, Chile) is a Chilean former footballer who played as a midfielder.

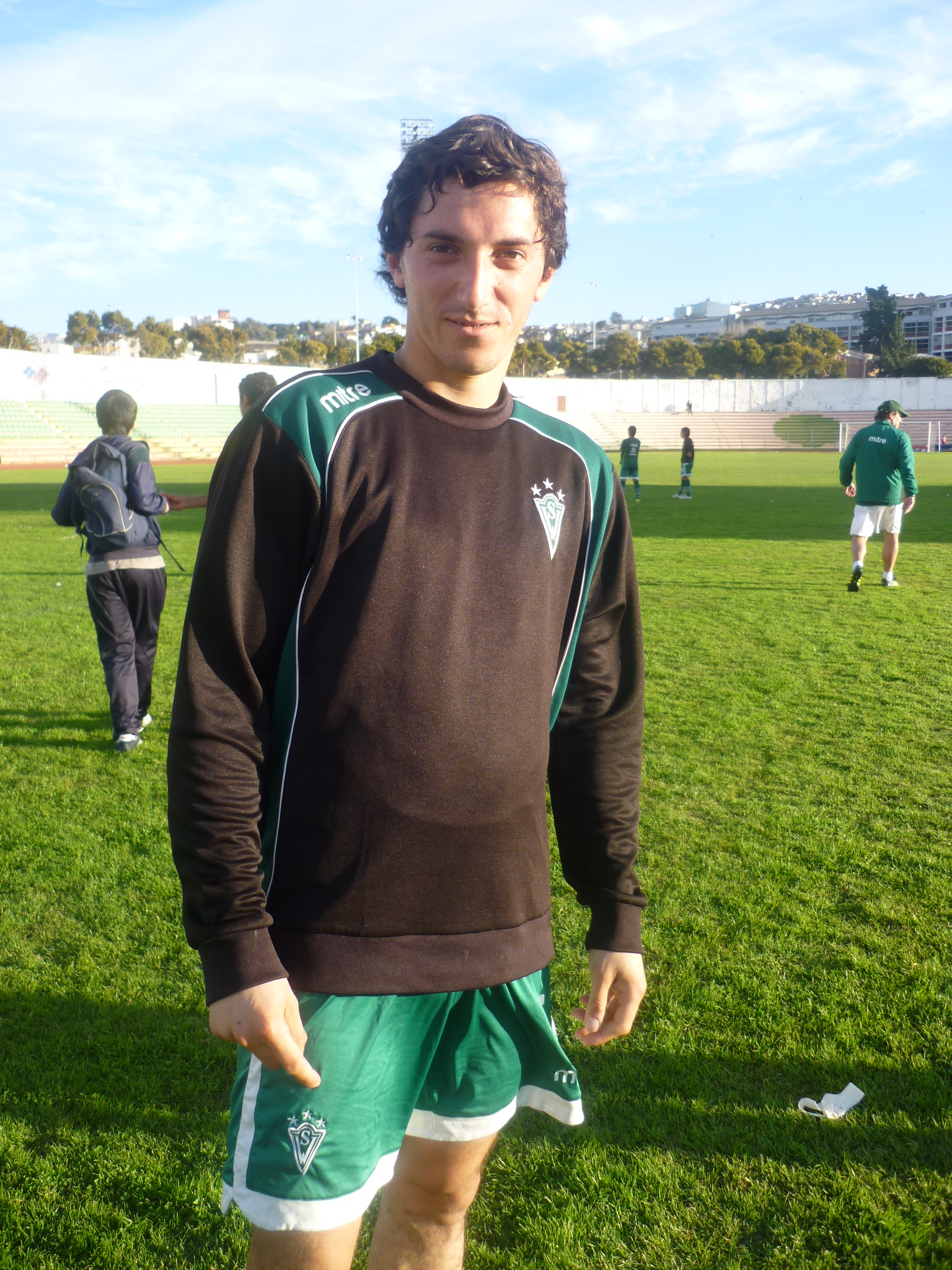

== Teams ==
- (Chile) Santiago Wanderers 2005–2015
- (Chile) San Marcos 2015–2018
- (Chile) San Luis 2019

== National team ==
- Chile U23 2008
