= Frank F. Schulz =

American politician (1863–1941)

Frank F. Schulz (1863 – April 6, 1941) was an American politician from New York.

== Life ==
Schulz was born in 1863 in Brooklyn, New York state. He initially worked as a clothing manufacturer. He was the son of Henry and Christina Schulz.

In 1893, Schulz was elected to the New York State Assembly as a Republican, representing the Kings County 10th District. He served in the Assembly in 1894 and 1895. In the 1912 United States House of Representatives election he was the Republican candidate for New York's 3rd congressional district. He lost to Frank E. Wilson. He also served as Brooklyn Supervisor of Records, and was a clerk in the Brooklyn County Court for thirty years.

Schulz's wife was Mattie B. He was president of the Williamsburg and Greenpoint Board of Trade. He was active in the Boards of Trade and the Eastern District Subway League. He was member of the Freemasons and the Odd Fellows.

Schulz died at home on April 6, 1941. He was buried in Evergreens Cemetery.

New York State Assembly
Preceded by William E. Melody	New York State Assembly; Kings County, 10th District; 1894-1895	Succeeded by William L. Perkins (New York politician)
