= Alexis Flores (footballer) =

Chilean footballer (born 1980)

Personal information
- Full name: Alexis Flores Cucoch-Petraello
- Date of birth: 14 December 1980 (age 45)
- Place of birth: Santiago, Chile
- Height: 1.83 m (6 ft 0 in)
- Position: Defender

Senior career*
Years	Team	Apps	(Gls)
2000	Deportes Santa Cruz		
2001–2002	Puerto Montt		
2003	Trasandino		
2004–2008	Copiapó		
2009–2011	San Luis de Quillota		
2011–2012	Deportes Copiapó		
2012–2014	Coquimbo Unido		
- * Club domestic league appearances and goals as of 25 March 2020

Alexis Flores Cucoch-Petraello (born 14 December 1980) was a Chilean footballer.
