= Ariel Cólzera =

Argentine footballer (born 1986)

Personal information
- Full name: Ariel Adrián Cólzera
- Date of birth: April 15, 1986 (age 40)
- Place of birth: Resistencia, Argentina
- Height: 1.75 m (5 ft 9 in)
- Positions: Forward; centre back

Team information
- Current team: Deportivo Merlo

Youth career
- Boca Juniors

Senior career*
Years	Team	Apps	(Gls)
2002–2005	Boca Juniors		
2005–2006	Gimnasia (J)	3	(1)
2006–2007	Teplice	2	(0)
2007–2008	Rafaela		
2008–2009	Huracán	23	(1)
2009–2010	Unión Santa Fe	25	(4)
2010	San Martín-SJ	16	(2)
2011–2012	La Calera	31	(4)
2012–2013	Santiago Wanderers	29	(5)
2013–2016	Crucero del Norte	67	(14)
2016–2017	Temperley	37	(4)
2017–2018	Juventud Unida	21	(7)
2018–2020	Sarmiento	21	(2)
2020	Temperley	8	(1)
2021–	Merlo	38	(5)

International career
2003	Argentina U-17		
- * Club domestic league appearances and goals as of 21:53, 7 May 2022 (UTC)

Ariel Adrián Cólzera, also known as Ariel Damián Cólzera, (born April 15, 1986) is an Argentine footballer currently playing for Deportivo Merlo.
