= Pablo Pereira (footballer, born 1986) =

Uruguayan footballer

Personal information
- Full name: Pablo Daniel Pereira Coitiño
- Date of birth: January 30, 1986 (age 40)
- Place of birth: Montevideo, Uruguay
- Height: 1.86 m (6 ft 1 in)
- Position: Forward

Team information
- Current team: Fernández Vial

Youth career
- Villa Española

Senior career*
Years	Team	Apps	(Gls)
2002–2006	Villa Española		
2007–2008	Fernández Vial		
2008	Rampla Juniors		
2009	Progreso		
2009–2010	Palestino	28	(3)
2011	Sport Recife	6	(0)
2011	Vitória	1	(0)
2012	El Tanque Sisley	13	(2)
2012–2013	Atenas		
2013	Unión Temuco	7	(0)
2013–2014	Deportes La Serena	11	(1)
2014	Central Español	4	(0)
2014–2015	Deportivo Carchá	10	(1)
2015	Rampla Juniors	7	(4)
2016	Juventud Unida	7	(0)
2016	Deportivo Carchá	7	(1)
2017	Deportivo Carchá	3	(0)
2017–2018	Central Español	21	(0)
2018	LDU Portoviejo	33	(2)
2019	Rampla Juniors	13	(6)
2019	Rangers	7	(1)
2020	Rampla Juniors	0	(0)
2020	Colón	13	(10)
2021–2022	Rampla Juniors	32	(5)
2022	Villa Española	9	(1)
2023	Deportes Recoleta	20	(3)
2024–	Fernández Vial		
- * Club domestic league appearances and goals as of 27 December 2023

Pablo Daniel Pereira Coitiño (born January 30, 1986, in Montevideo, Uruguay), better known as Pablo Pereira, is an Uruguayan footballer who plays as a forward for Chilean club Fernández Vial.

== Career ==
After a spell in Chile with Rangers de Talca, Pereira returned to Uruguay and re-joined Rampla Juniors in February 2020. In the summer 2020, he then moved to Colón FC. At the end of March 2021, he once again returned to Rampla Juniors.

In 2023, he played for Deportes Recoleta in the Primera B de Chile. The next season, he switched to Fernández Vial.
