= Roberto Órdenes =

Chilean footballer (born 1981)

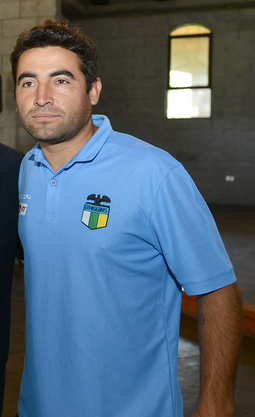
- Órdenes with O'Higgins in 2013

Personal information
- Full name: Roberto Daniel Órdenes Contreras
- Date of birth: January 5, 1981 (age 45)
- Place of birth: Santiago, Chile
- Height: 1.76 m (5 ft 9 1/2 in)
- Position: Midfielder

Youth career
- 1995–1999: Unión Española

Senior career*
Years	Team	Apps	(Gls)
2000–2006	Unión Española	155	(12)
2006	→ FC Locarno (loan)	12	(0)
2007–2008	Universidad de Concepción	65	(8)
2009	Ñublense	17	(3)
2009–2010	Unión Española	35	(3)
2011	Unión La Calera	19	(1)
2012	Santiago Wanderers	20	(2)
2013–2014	O'Higgins	6	(1)
2014–2015	Magallanes	23	(3)
2017	Deportes Melipilla	3	(0)
Total		355	(33)

International career
2001	Chile U20	1	(0)
- * Club domestic league appearances and goals

Roberto Daniel Órdenes Contreras (born 5 January 1981) is a Chilean former footballer who played as midfielder.

== Club career ==
Órdenes was champion with the Unión Española in the Torneo Apertura 2005, where he starred in the great campaign in the red team.

After abruptly leaving the club's preseason Ñublense of Chillan for allegedly calling a club of Israel, after days reappeared wearing the colors in Unión Española.

Órdenes won the Apertura 2013-14 with O'Higgins. In the tournament, he played in 15 of 18 matches.

In 2014, he won the Supercopa de Chile against Deportes Iquique, match that O'Higgins won at the penalty shoot-out.

He participated with the club in the 2014 Copa Libertadores where they faced Deportivo Cali, Cerro Porteño and Lanús, being third and being eliminated in the group stage.

== International career ==
Órdenes was part of Chile U20 team argued that the 2001 FIFA World Youth Championship in 2001.

=== Controversies ===
Previous to 2001 FIFA World Youth Championship, Órdenes and seven other players were arrested in a brothel what must to be closed. The incident was known as "El episodio de las luces rojas" (Chapter of the red lights) due to the excuse employed by Jaime Valdés.

After the tournament, the eight players (Valdés, Millar, Salgado, Pardo, Soto, Droguett, Campos and Órdenes) were suspended for three international matches.

== Coaching career ==
Órdenes has worked as a coach for the Unión Española youth ranks.

== Personal life ==
His son, Agustín, has been with the Colo-Colo youth ranks.

== Honours ==
=== Player ===
Unión Española

- Primera División de Chile: 2005 Apertura

O'Higgins

- Primera División de Chile: 2013 Apertura
- Supercopa de Chile: 2014

Individual

- Medalla Santa Cruz de Triana: 2014
