= Rodrigo Toloza =

Chilean footballer (born 1984)

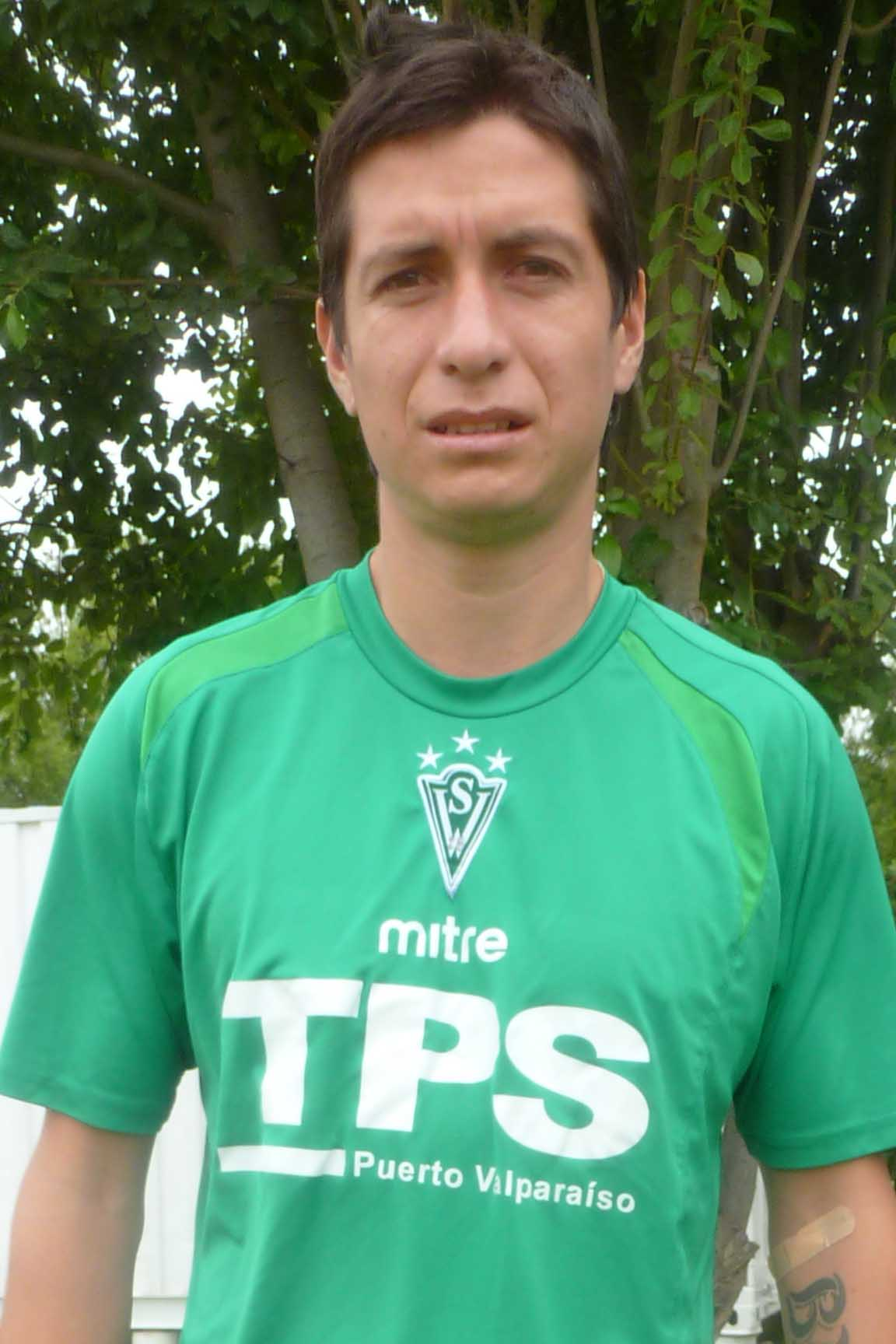

Personal information
- Full name: Rodrigo Alejandro Toloza Vilches
- Date of birth: 3 May 1984 (age 42)
- Place of birth: Chile
- Height: 1.79 m (5 ft 10 1/2 in)
- Position: Attacking midfielder

Senior career*
Years	Team	Apps	(Gls)
2005–2007	Palestino	121	(27)
2007–2011	Universidad Católica	99	(35)
2012–2013	Santiago Wanderers	31	(7)
2014	San Luis de Quillota	10	(0)

International career^{‡}
2005	Chile	1	(0)
- * Club domestic league appearances and goals as of 7 February 2013 ‡ National team caps and goals as of 24 December 2007

Rodrigo Alejandro Toloza Vilches (born 3 May 1984) is a Chilean former footballer who played as an attacking midfielder.

== Club career ==
He arrived at the club from CD Palestino where he appeared in more than 100 matches scoring 27 goals. Toloza has played for the Chile national football team in the sub 17, sub 23 and senior categories. He made his senior debut in 2005 at age 21 in a game against the Peru national football team.

In 2007, he joined Universidad Católica taking a position as quickly and playing quite holder of the matches of the championship. In his first season, he played 19 matches, scored 7 goals being the second scorer of the team.

== Honours ==
=== Club ===
Universidad Católica

- Primera División de Chile (1): 2010
- Copa Chile (1): 2011
