= Leonardo Zarosa =

Argentine footballer

Leonardo Iván Zarosa
Personal information
- Date of birth: September 12, 1989 (age 37)
- Place of birth: Buenos Aires, Argentina
- Position: Midfielder

Team information
- Current team: Rivadavia de Venado Tuerto

Youth career
- Independiente

Senior career*
Years	Team	Apps	(Gls)
2004	Rentistas		
2004-2005	Miramar Misiones		
2006	Tacuarembó		
2006	Durazno FC		
2007-2008	Almirante Brown		
2009-2010	San Luis de Quillota		
2011	Guaraní		
2011	Everton		
2011-2012	Juventud Antoniana		
2012-2013	Trujillanos FC		
2013	Aragua FC		
2013-2014	Llaneros de Guanare		
2014	Deportivo Petare		
- * Club domestic league appearances and goals

Leonardo Iván Zarosa (born September 12, 1989) is an Argentine professional footballer who plays as a midfielder for Rivadavia de Venado Tuerto.

Born in Buenos Aires, Zarosa began playing football in the youth system of local club Independiente. He played professionally in Argentina, Chile, Paraguay, Uruguay and Venezuela.

== Teams ==
- Rentistas 2004
- Miramar Misiones 2004–2005
- Tacuarembó 2006
- Durazno FC 2006
- Almirante Brown 2007–2008
- San Luis de Quillota 2009–2010
- Guaraní 2011
- Everton 2011
- Juventud Antoniana 2011–2012
- Trujillanos FC 2012–2013
- Aragua FC 2013
- Llaneros de Guanare 2013–2014
- Deportivo Petare 2014
- Rivadavia de Venado Tuerto 2014–

== Honours ==
San Luis de Quillota

- Primera B: 2009
