= Ezequiel Carballo =

Argentine footballer

Personal information
- Full name: Ezequiel Damián Carballo
- Date of birth: 10 November 1989 (age 37)
- Place of birth: Morteros, Argentina
- Height: 1.80 m (5 ft 11 in)
- Position: Forward

Senior career*
Years	Team	Apps	(Gls)
2006–2015	9 de Julio de Morteros	137	(35)
2010–2011	→ Ferro Carril Oeste (loan)	18	(5)
2011–2012	→ Unión San Felipe (loan)	23	(5)
2012	→ Unión San Felipe B (loan)	1	(0)
2012	→ Central Español (loan)	7	(0)
2015	Gimnasia y Tiro	11	(1)
2016–2017	Unión de Sunchales	26	(5)
2017–2018	Albissola	27	(4)
2018–2019	Marsala		
2020	9 de Julio Olímpico	3	(0)
2020	Montebelluna	0	(0)
2020–2021	Albenga		
- * Club domestic league appearances and goals as of 19:59, 5 August 2021 (UTC)

Ezequiel Damián Carballo (born 10 November 1989) is an Argentine footballer. He plays as a striker.

== Career ==
After a spell in 2020 at 9 de Julio Olímpico in Freyre, Argentina, Carballo returned to Italy where he joined Calcio Montebelluna 1909 in March 2020. In July 2020, Carballo moved to another Italian club, A.S.D. Albenga 1928.
