= Alves Machado =

Brazilian footballer (born 1981)

Fernando Alves Machado (born December 25, 1981, in Pelotas, Brazil) is a Brazilian footballer currently playing for Sportivo Rivadavia of the Torneo Argentino B.

== Teams ==
- (Brazil) Guarany de Bagé 2003
- (Brazil) Brasil de Pelotas 2003
- (Uruguay) Deportivo Colonia 2004
- (Argentina) Real Arroyo Seco 2005
- (Argentina) Crucero del Norte 2005-2006
- (Argentina) Real Arroyo Seco 2006-2007
- (Argentina) La Emilia 2008
- (Chile) San Luis de Quillota 2009-2010
- (Chile) Everton 2011
- (Argentina) La Emilia 2012-
- (Argentina) Sportivo Rivadavia 2013-

== Titles ==
- (Chile) San Luis Quillota 2009 Primera B
