= Manuel Simpertegui =

Chilean footballer (born 1988)

Personal information
- Full name: Manuel Rodrigo Simpertegui Flores
- Date of birth: 4 January 1988 (age 38)
- Place of birth: Tomé, Chile
- Height: 1.73 m (5 ft 8 in)
- Position: Defender

Senior career*
Years	Team	Apps	(Gls)
2007–2011	Deportes Concepción	58	(5)
2012–2013	Deportes Temuco	36	(5)
2013–2014	Barnechea	37	(9)
2014–2015	Santiago Morning	23	(2)
2015–2016	Cobreloa	16	(2)
2016	Ferrocarril Sud	11	(2)
2017	Santiago Morning	2	(0)
2017	Independiente Cauquenes	12	(0)
Total		195	(25)
- * Club domestic league appearances and goals

Manuel Rodrigo Simpertegui Flores (born 4 January 1988) is a Chilean former footballer who played as a defender.

== Career ==
At international level, he was part of a Chile under-25 squad in a training session led by Claudio Borghi in May 2011, alongside his teammates in Deportes Concepción, David Llanos and Patricio Jerez.
