= Franz Schultz =

Chilean footballer (born 1991)

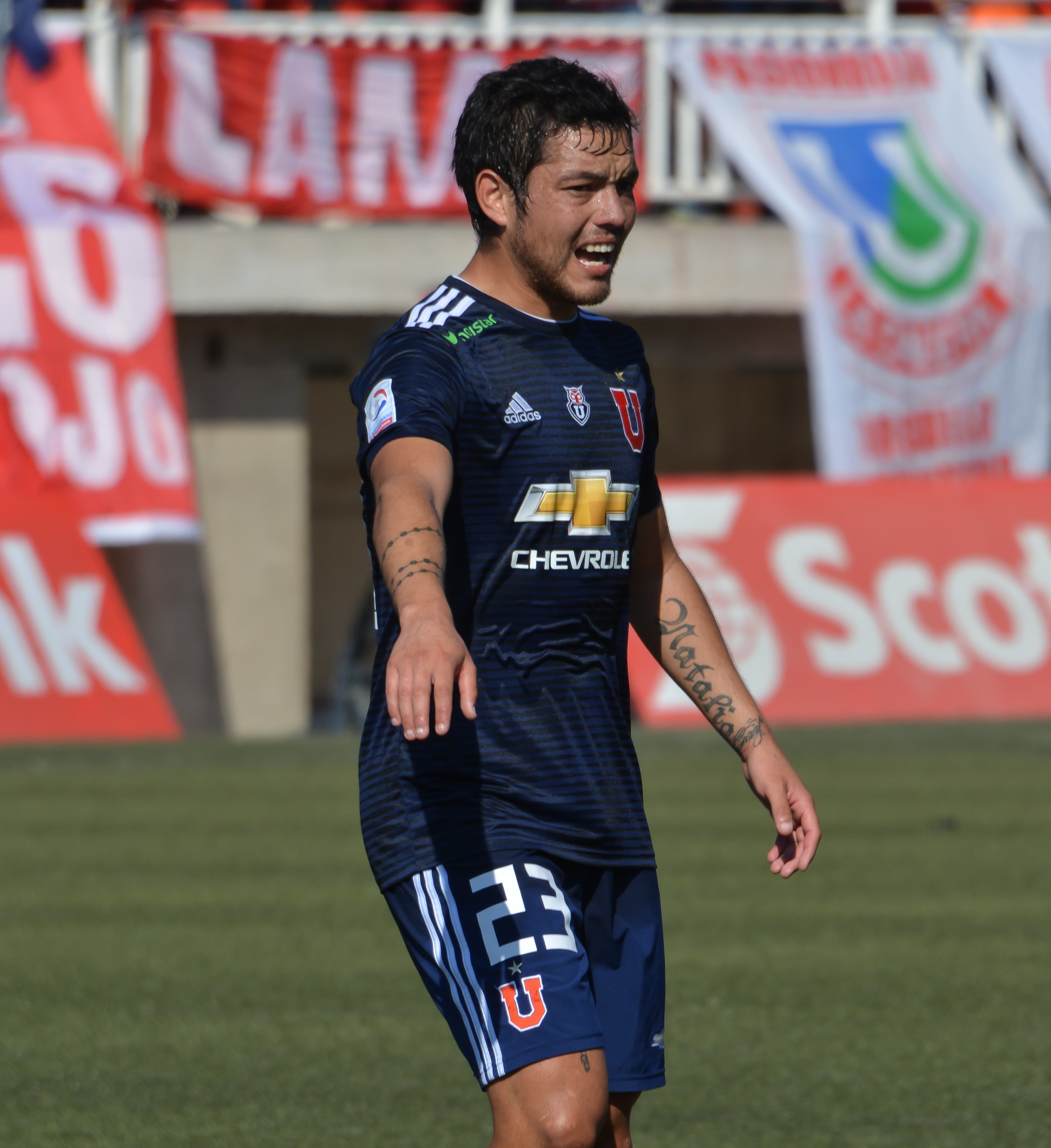
- Schultz with Universidad de Chile in 2018

Personal information
- Full name: Franz Hermann Schultz Ramírez
- Date of birth: 20 July 1991 (age 35)
- Place of birth: Valparaíso, Chile
- Height: 1.72 m (5 ft 8 in)
- Positions: Midfielder; full-back

Team information
- Current team: Unión Glorias Navales
- Number: 8

Youth career
- 1998–2011: Santiago Wanderers

Senior career*
Years	Team	Apps	(Gls)
2009–2016	Santiago Wanderers	100	(3)
2016–2018	Universidad de Chile	30	(0)
2017	→ O'Higgins (loan)	15	(1)
2019	Deportes Antofagasta	8	(1)
2020	Deportes Iquique	18	(0)
2021	Barnechea	23	(0)
2022	Santiago Wanderers	14	(0)
2023	Cipolletti	8	(0)
2024	Deportes Linares	20	(0)
2025–	Unión Glorias Navales	–	(–)
- * Club domestic league appearances and goals as of 17 April 2026

Franz Hermann Schultz Ramírez (born 20 July 1991) is a Chilean footballer who plays as a midfielder or full-back for Unión Glorias Navales in the Tercera B.

== Career ==
In the 2023 season, Schultz move abroad by first time in his career and joined Argentine club Cipolletti in the Torneo Federal A. The next year, he returned to Chile and joined Deportes Linares in the Segunda División Profesional.

Schultz officially retired in 2025.

On 2 May 2025, Schultz joined amateur club Glorias Navales in the Asociación Achupallas from Viña del Mar and also he assumed as a scout. The next season, he continued with them in the Tercera B.

== Coaching career ==
In March 2025, Schultz paused his career to start an eponymous sport academy in Valparaíso.
