= Juan Álvarez (footballer, born 1942) =

Chilean footballer (1942–2023)

Personal information
- Full name: Juan Silvestre Álvarez Rubiño
- Date of birth: 30 October 1942
- Place of birth: Mejillones, Chile
- Date of death: 28 October 2023 (aged 80)
- Place of death: Valparaíso, Chile
- Height: 1.75 m (5 ft 9 in)
- Position: Striker

Youth career
- Rápido de Mejillones
- Viva Chile

Senior career*
Years	Team	Apps	(Gls)
1958–1962	San Luis		
1962–1969	Santiago Wanderers	178	(71)
1969–1970	Lota Schwager		
1971–1972	Deportes La Serena	40	(10)
1972	Palestino		
1973	Bolívar		
1973–1974	Deportes La Serena	11	(4)
1974–1975	Santiago Wanderers	52	(13)
1976	Unión La Calera		

Managerial career
- Santiago Wanderers (youth)
- * Club domestic league appearances and goals

Juan Silvestre Álvarez Rubiño (30 October 1942 – 28 October 2023) was a Chilean football striker who played for clubs in Chile and Bolivia. A historical player of Santiago Wanderers, he is the top goalscorer in the club history.

== Playing career ==
A striker, Álvarez was with both Rápido from Mejillones and Viva Chile from Limache in his youth career. He began his professional career with San Luis de Quillota in 1958, winning the league title of the Segunda División and earning promotion to the top division.

In the top division, he played for San Luis, Santiago Wanderers, Lota Schwager and Deportes La Serena. A historical player of Santiago Wanderers, he won the second league title for the club in 1968 alongside well remembered players such as Vicente Cantatore, Reynaldo Hoffmann, Juan Olivares, among others, a team known as The Panzers. He also became the top goalscorer in the club history with 84 goals and has been chosen as centre-forward of the all-time team by the club fans.

He coincided with his fellow Ricardo Cabrera in Santiago Wanderers, Lota Schwager and Deportes La Serena, becoming his best attacking partner.

He scored the first goal in the history of the Estadio Monumental of Colo-Colo as a player of Santiago Wanderers, in a match against Santiago Morning on 20 April 1975.

In the second division, he played for Lota Schwager, Palestino and Unión La Calera, his last club. At that division, he also won the league titles in 1969 with Lota Schwager and 1972 with Palestino.

Abroad, he had a stint with Bolivian club Bolívar of the Asociación de Fútbol de La Paz in 1973.

Well known for his strong personality, he retired in 1976 as a player of Unión La Calera, due to the fact that he was sanctioned for fifteen matchdays after supposedly assaulting a referee.

== Coaching career ==
Álvarez worked for many years in the Santiago Wanderers youth ranks, taking part in the training of players such as David Pizarro and Reinaldo Navia.

== Personal life ==
Born in Mejillones, Chile, Álvarez moved to Limache along with his family in 1955. As a student, he attended the Rafael Ariztía Institute of the Marist Brothers.

Álvarez, nicknamed Tanque (Tank), is the father of another former player of Santiago Wanderers, Claudio Álvarez, who inherited the nickname.

Álvarez died on 28 October 2023, at the age of 80.

== Legacy ==
The municipal sports complex of Mejillones, his city of birth, was given his name, '"Juan Álvarez Rubiño".
