= José Barrera =

Chilean footballer (born 1988)

Personal information
- Full name: José Hernán Barrera Escobar
- Date of birth: 9 February 1988 (age 38)
- Place of birth: Santiago, Chile
- Height: 1.75 m (5 ft 9 in)
- Position: Midfielder

Senior career*
Years	Team	Apps	(Gls)
2007–2012	Santiago Morning	89	(0)
2011	→ Everton (loan)	5	(0)
2013	Unión La Calera	9	(0)
2014–2015	Magallanes	53	(3)
2015–2016	Cobreloa	10	(3)
2016–2019	Rangers	42	(2)
2020	Lautaro de Buin	3	(0)
2021	Deportes Concepción	0	(0)
Total		211	(8)

International career
2009	Chile U21	3	(0)
- * Club domestic league appearances and goals

José Hernán Barrera Escobar (born 9 February 1988) is a Chilean former footballer who played as a midfielder.

== Career ==
He retired in the 2021 season.

=== Controversies ===
In 2021, he joined Deportes Concepción in the Chilean Segunda División, but he was fired along with his teammate Yerko Rojas due to have taken part in a party at a Deportes Concepción's department in Nonguén, Biobío Region, in the context of COVID-19 pandemic.

== Honours ==
=== International ===
Chile U21

- Toulon Tournament (1): 2009
