= Jorge Piris =

Argentine footballer

Personal information
- Full name: Jorge Maximiliano Piris
- Date of birth: 22 July 1990 (age 36)
- Place of birth: Buenos Aires, Argentina
- Height: 1.67 m (5 ft 6 in)
- Position: Forward

Senior career*
Years	Team	Apps	(Gls)
2011–2014	Chacarita Juniors	68	(13)
2014	Palestino	3	(0)
2015	Acassuso	8	(0)
2015	Cobreloa	11	(1)
2016–2017	San Telmo	15	(2)
2018	Independiente Chivilcoy	1	(0)
2018–2021	Leandro N. Alem	43	(6)
Total		149	(22)
- * Club domestic league appearances and goals

Jorge Maximiliano Piris (born 22 July 1990) is a former Argentine footballer.

== Career ==
Besides Argentina, Piris played in Chile for Palestino in the top level and Cobreloa in the Primera B.
