= Alejandro Maureira =

Chilean footballer (born 1983)

Personal information
- Full name: Alejandro Antonio Maureira Cueto
- Date of birth: 26 July 1983 (age 43)
- Place of birth: Vina del Mar, Chile
- Height: 1.71 m (5 ft 7 in)
- Position: Midfielder

Senior career*
| Years | Team | Apps | (Gls) |
| 2002–2004 | Fernández Vial | | |
| 2005 | San Marcos | 4 | (0) |
| 2006–2007 | Ñublense | 26 | (6) |
| 2007–2008 | Deportivo Zacapa | | |
| 2008 | Lota Schwager | 11 | (0) |
| 2009 | Deportes Concepción | 25 | (5) |
| 2010–2011 | Curicó Unido | 61 | (5) |
| 2012 | Everton | 15 | (1) |
| 2012 | Santiago Morning | 6 | (2) |
| 2013–2014 | Magallanes | 27 | (1) |

Managerial career
- 2017–2021: Curicó Unido (women)
- 2017–2021: Curicó Unido (women) U17
- 2020–2021: Curicó Unido U21
- * Club domestic league appearances and goals

Alejandro Antonio Maureira Cueto (born 26 July 1983) is a Chilean former footballer.

== Playing career ==
He played for Curicó Unido.

== Coaching career ==
From 2017 he worked for Curicó Unido (women) at both senior and under-17 levels. He also was in charge of coaching the men's under-21 team.
