= Héctor Núñez (footballer, born 1992) =

Chilean footballer

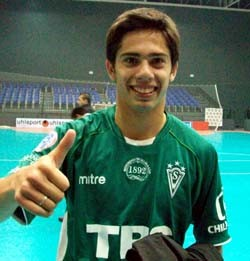
- Núñez with Santiago Wanderers

Personal information
- Full name: Héctor Núñez Segovia
- Date of birth: 15 April 1992 (age 34)
- Place of birth: Asunción, Paraguay
- Height: 1.84 m (6 ft 0 in)
- Position: Forward

Youth career
- Santiago Wanderers

Senior career*
Years	Team	Apps	(Gls)
2009–2015	Santiago Wanderers	29	(5)
2013	→ Unión La Calera (loan)	9	(0)
2014	→ Deportes Concepción (loan)	12	(1)
2015–2016	WSG Wattens	36	(21)
2016	San Antonio Unido	0	(0)
2017	Cobán Imperial	17	(3)
2017–2018	Presidente Hayes	–	(–)
2019	Nõmme Kalju	6	(1)
2019	General Díaz	2	(0)
2021	Presidente Hayes		
- * Club domestic league appearances and goals as of 26 July 2022

Héctor Núñez Segovia (born 15 April 1992) is a Paraguayan-born Chilean footballer who last played as a forward for Presidente Hayes in the Paraguayan Tercera División.

== Career ==
On 12 February 2019, Núñez joined Estonian club Nõmme Kalju on a contract until the end of 2021. He left the club on 10 July 2019.

== Personal life ==
Núñez was born in Asunción, Paraguay, to a Chilean father, Héctor, and a Paraguayan mother, Ada, who is the daughter of the Paraguayan former footballer and President of Cerro Porteño, Nelson Segovia González, deceased in 2013. As a baby, he came to Chile along with his family and has two sisters, Ivonne and Isabela.
