= Enzo Guerrero =

Chilean footballer (born 1991)

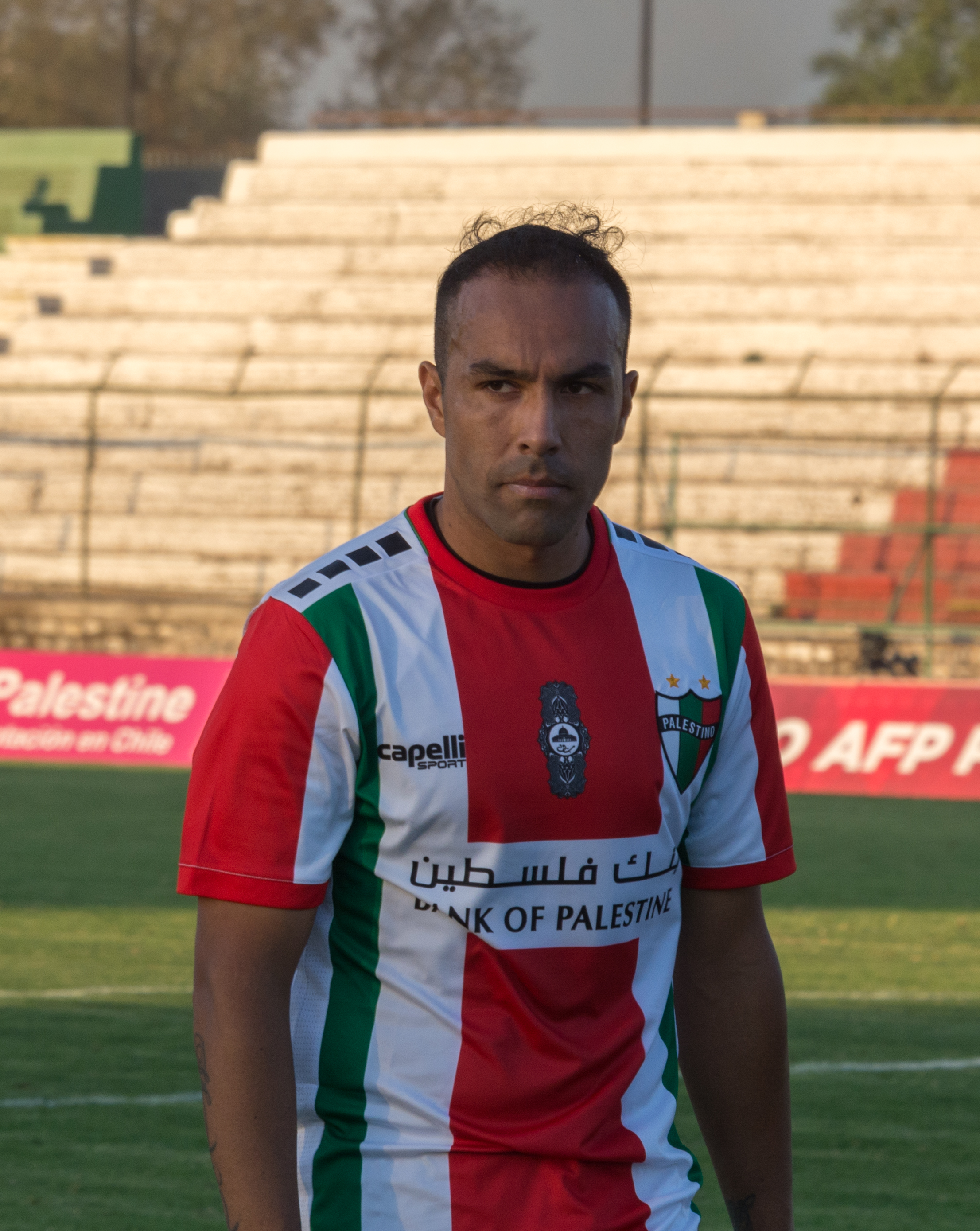
- Guerrero with Palestino in 2019

Personal information
- Full name: Enzo Francesco Guerrero Segovia
- Date of birth: 31 January 1991 (age 35)
- Place of birth: Andacollo, Chile
- Height: 1.75 m (5 ft 9 in)
- Position: Defender

Youth career
- Unión Placoro
- Palestino Andacollo
- 2007–2009: Coquimbo Unido

Senior career*
| Years | Team | Apps | (Gls) |
| 2009–2015 | Coquimbo Unido | 106 | (5) |
| 2015–2016 | Cobreloa | 29 | (1) |
| 2016–2017 | Deportes Iquique | 28 | (1) |
| 2018–2021 | Palestino | 52 | (2) |
| 2021–2023 | Ñublense | 42 | (0) |
| 2024 | Deportes La Serena | 24 | (1) |
| 2025 | Provincial Ovalle | 5 | (0) |
| Total | | 286 | (10) |

International career
| 2011 | Chile U20 | 6 | (0) |
- * Club domestic league appearances and goals

Enzo Francesco Guerrero Segovia (born 31 January 1991) is a Chilean former footballer who played as a defender.

== Club career ==
Born in Andacollo, Chile, Guerrero was with the local clubs Unión Placoro and Palestino before joining the Coquimbo Unido youth ranks in 2007.

From 2021 to 2023, Guerrero played for Chilean Primera División side Ñublense. In 2024, he switched to Deportes La Serena in the second level.

After being a free agent during the first half of 2025, Guerrero signed with Provincial Ovalle in the Segunda División Profesional de Chile on 21 June of the same year.

On 3 March 2026, Guerrero announced his retirement after an 18-year career.

== International career ==
He represented Chile U20 at the 2011 South American U-20 Championship, making appearances in six matches.

== Honours ==
Coquimbo Unido

- Primera B: 2014-C (Note: no promotion to Primera División)

Palestino

- Copa Chile: 2018
