= Boris Sandoval =

Chilean soccer player and manager (born 1987)

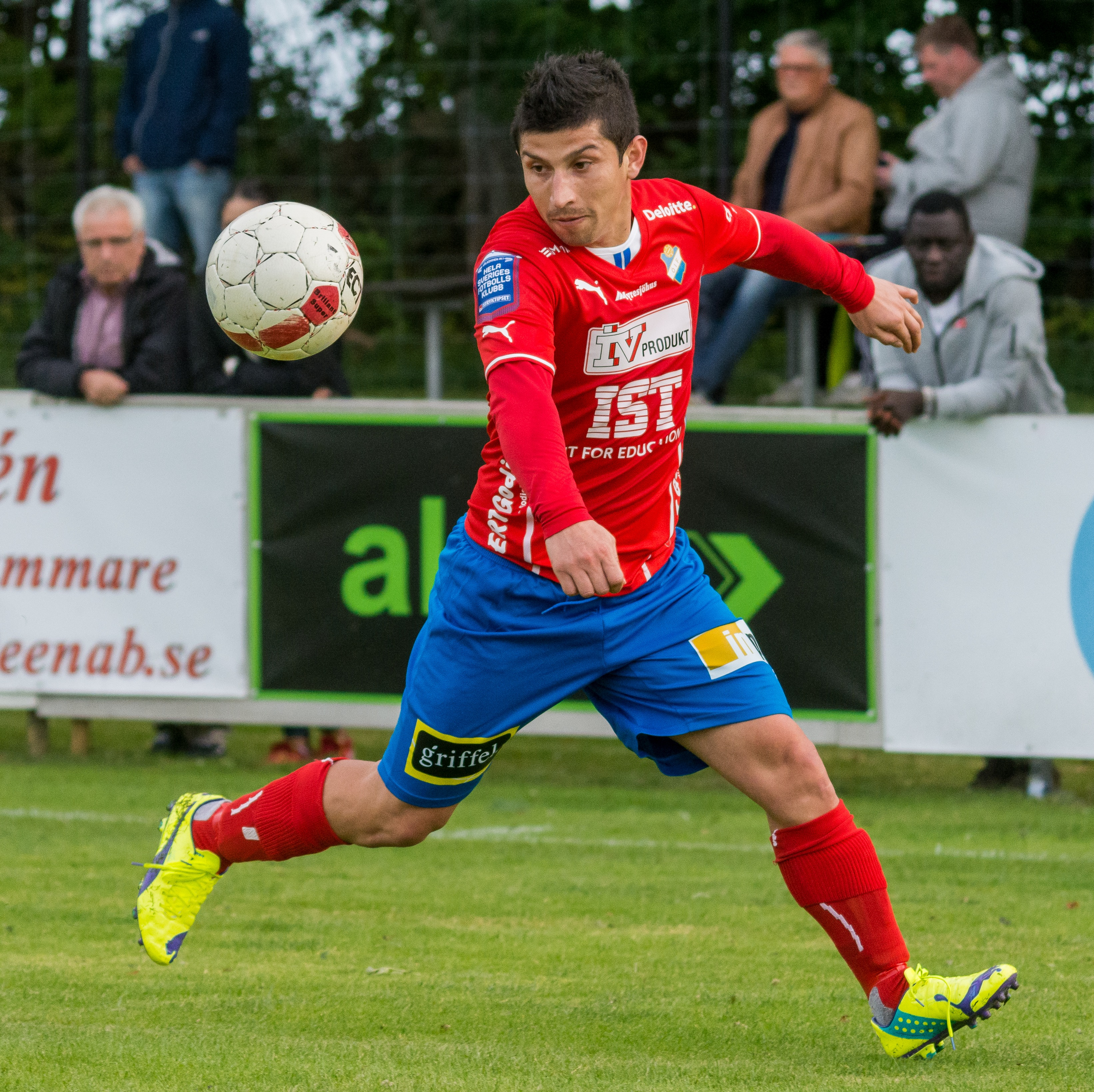

Personal information
- Full name: Boris Abraham Sandoval Molina
- Date of birth: 12 March 1987 (age 39)
- Place of birth: Concepción, Chile
- Height: 1.68 m (5 ft 6 in)
- Position: Defender

Youth career
- Olimpia Talcahuano
- Tigritos Río Negro
- Huachipato

Senior career*
Years	Team	Apps	(Gls)
2008–2011	Naval	27	(1)
2011	Huachipato	16	(0)
2012–2013	Santiago Wanderers	43	(3)
2013–2014	Ñublense	21	(0)
2014	Östers IF	1	(0)
2015	Rangers	11	(0)
2015–2016	Cobreloa	22	(0)
2016–2017	San Marcos	7	(0)
2017	Naval	14	(2)
2018	Santiago Wanderers	6	(0)
2019	Naval	1	(0)
Total		169	(6)
- * Club domestic league appearances and goals

Boris Abraham Sandoval Molina (born March 12, 1987, in Concepción, Chile) is a Chilean former footballer.

== Career ==
Sandoval was part of a Chile under-25 squad in a training session led by Claudio Borghi in May 2011, being a player of Naval.

Sandoval made his last appearance with Naval in on 25 June 2019.
