= 2009 Colo-Colo season =

Colo-Colo
2009 season
- President: (Chile) Gabriel Ruiz-Tagle
- Manager: (Argentina) Hugo Tocalli
- Torneo Apertura: 13th
- Torneo Clausura: Winners
- Copa Chile: Quarterfinals
- Copa Libertadores: Group stage
- Top goalscorer: League: Ezequiel Miralles (11); All: Lucas Barrios (13)
Home colours	Away colours

The 2009 season is Club Social y Deportivo Colo-Colo's 78th season at Chilean Primera División. This article shows player statistics and all matches (official and friendly) that the club have played during the 2009 season.

== Players ==
=== Squad information ===
Note: Flags indicate national team as defined under FIFA eligibility rules; some limited exceptions apply. Players may hold more than one non-FIFA nationality.

No.	Pos.	Nation	Player
1	GK	ARG	Cristián Muñoz
2	DF	CHI	Paulo Magalhães
3	DF	CHI	Luis Mena (1st vice-captain)
4	MF	CHI	Roberto Cereceda
5	DF	CHI	Miguel Riffo (2nd vice-captain)
7	FW	CHI	Esteban Paredes
9	FW	PAR	Cristian Bogado
10	MF	COL	Macnelly Torres
11	FW	ARG	Ezequiel Miralles
12	GK	CHI	Raúl Olivares
14	MF	CHI	Rodrigo Millar
15	DF	CHI	Diego Olate
16	MF	CHI	Charles Aránguiz
17	MF	CHI	Arturo Sanhueza (captain)

No.	Pos.	Nation	Player
18	MF	CHI	Rodrigo Meléndez (3rd vice-captain)
19	MF	CHI	Gerardo Cortés
20	DF	CHI	Rafael Caroca
22	FW	CHI	Daud Gazale
23	MF	CHI	Luis Pavez
24	MF	PAR	Domingo Salcedo
25	GK	CHI	Francisco Prieto
26	DF	CHI	Sebastián Toro
27	DF	VEN	José Manuel Rey
29	FW	CHI	Yashir Pinto
30	FW	CHI	Phillip Araos
31	MF	CHI	Esteban Pavez
33	MF	CHI	Alex von Schwedler
34	GK	CHI	Ignacio González

== Matches ==
=== Torneo Apertura ===
==== Standings ====
Pos	Team	Pld	W	D	L	GF	GA	GD	Pts
11	Universidad de Concepción	17	6	5	6	24	25	−1	23
12	Ñublense	17	5	5	7	16	23	−7	20
13	Colo-Colo	17	5	4	8	28	28	0	19
14	Curicó Unido	17	5	4	8	24	28	−4	19
15	Cobresal	17	4	7	6	23	34	−11	19

Updated to match(es) played on May 21, 2009. Source: RSSSF
Rules for classification: 1st points; 2nd wins; 3rd goal difference; 4th goals scored; 5th away goals

Pos	Team	Pld	W	D	L	GF	GA	GD	Pts	Qualification
2	Deportes La Serena	17	11	0	6	31	19	+12	33	Playoffs
3	Audax Italiano	17	9	5	3	26	22	+4	32	Playoffs
4	Colo-Colo	17	8	4	5	28	19	+9	28	Playoffs
5	Universidad de Concepción	17	8	3	6	23	23	0	27	Playoffs
6	Santiago Morning	17	8	2	7	22	25	−3	26	Playoffs

Updated to match(es) played on November 8, 2009. Source: RSSSF
Rules for classification: 1st points; 2nd wins; 3rd goal difference; 4th goals scored; 5th away goals

==== Regular stage ====
31 January 2009 1	Curicó Unido	2–2	Colo-Colo	Talca
17:00 UTC−3	Moreno 50'; Díaz 90+1'	Report	Barrios 23'; Torres 57'; Cabrera (red card) 64'; Meléndez (red card) 89'	Stadium: Fiscal; Attendance: 12,000; Referee: Claudio Puga
Note: The match, originally scheduled at Estadio La Granja in Curicó, had to be relocated due to its small capacity and safety concerns.

6 February 2009 2	Deportes La Serena	0–3	Colo-Colo	La Serena
21:00 UTC−3		Report	Barrios 24', 86'; Carranza 90+1'	Stadium: La Portada; Attendance: 12,000; Referee: Jorge Osorio

14 February 2009 3	Colo-Colo	2–0	Universidad de Concepción	Macul, Santiago
19:00 UTC−3	Millar 12'; Carranza 19'	Report		Stadium: Monumental; Attendance: 8,000; Referee: Eduardo Gamboa

22 February 2009 4	Audax Italiano	2–1	Colo-Colo	La Florida, Santiago
19:00 UTC−3	Orellana 53'; Quiroga 85'	Report	Carranza 45+1' (pen.); Figueroa (red card) 76'	Stadium: Bicentenario; Attendance: 3,157; Referee: Enrique Osses

25 February 2009 5	Colo-Colo	4–2	Santiago Morning	Macul, Santiago
21:00 UTC−3	Riffo 33'; Barrios 36', 43'; Cortés 53'	Report	Paredes 6'; Rivarola 87'	Stadium: Monumental; Attendance: 7,107; Referee: Carlos Chandía

28 February 2009 6	Rangers	2–1	Colo-Colo	Talca
18:00 UTC−3	Avendaño 8'; C. Arancibia 61'	Report	Araos 34'	Stadium: Fiscal; Attendance: 5,038; Referee: Eduardo Ponce

15 March 2009 8	Colo-Colo	0–1	Universidad Católica	Macul, Santiago
17:00 UTC−4		Report	Rubio 14'	Stadium: Monumental; Attendance: 25,000; Referee: Pablo Pozo

18 March 2009 7(*)	Colo-Colo	1–1	O'Higgins	Macul, Santiago
20:00 UTC−4	Araos 76'	Report	González 14'	Stadium: Monumental; Attendance: 7,052; Referee: Enrique Osses
Note: The match was originally scheduled between 7 and 8 March, but was postponed in order to allow Colo-Colo to play against LDU Quito at the Copa Libertadores (12 March).

21 March 2009 9	Unión Española	5–2	Colo-Colo	Independencia, Santiago
16:30 UTC−4	Ramírez 45+1'; Canales 48', 83'; Neira 52', 89' (pen.)	Report	Torres 24'; Barrios 72'	Stadium: Santa Laura; Attendance: 5,359; Referee: Enrique Osses

4 April 2009 10	Colo-Colo	1–2	Municipal Iquique	Macul, Santiago
17:30 UTC−4	Salcedo 78'	Report	Martel 41', 82' (pen.)	Stadium: Monumental; Attendance: 9,333; Referee: Álvaro García

12 April 2009 12	Ñublense	2–0	Colo-Colo	Chillán
15:30 UTC−4	Ramos 6', 36'	Report	Cereceda (red card) 25'	Stadium: Nelson Oyarzún; Attendance: 9,906; Referee: Patricio Polic

19 April 2009 13	Universidad de Chile	1–3	Colo-Colo	Ñuñoa, Santiago
16:00 UTC−4	Olivera 52'; J. Rojas (red card) 78'	Report	Barrios 12', 33'; Figueroa 68'	Stadium: Nacional; Attendance: 45,000; Referee: Carlos Chandía

25 April 2009 14	Colo-Colo	2–2	Huachipato	Macul, Santiago
19:00 UTC−4	Carranza 59'; Barrios 70'	Report	Quinteros 36'; Monje 43'	Stadium: Monumental; Attendance: 15,873; Referee: Álvaro García

2 May 2009 15	Cobreloa	2–0	Colo-Colo	Calama
15:00 UTC−4	Mannara 72'; Magalhães 86'	Report	Jara (red card) 78'	Stadium: Municipal; Attendance: 8,818; Referee: Enrique Osses

9 May 2009 16	Colo-Colo	5–2	Cobresal	Macul, Santiago
18:00 UTC−4	Millar 14'; Figueroa 39'; Opazo (red card) 48'; Barrios 54', 64'; Mena 62'	Report	Canales 45+2'; Alzamora 78'	Stadium: Monumental; Attendance: 6,280; Referee: Claudio Fuenzalida

13 May 2009 11(*)	Colo-Colo	1–1	Everton	Macul, Santiago
20:00 UTC−4	Salcedo 27'	Report	Miralles 4'	Stadium: Monumental; Attendance: 12,000; Referee: Jorge Osorio
Note: The match was originally scheduled between 27 and 28 March, but was postponed because Everton played against Ñublense at the same day, in a match that was previously postponed in order to allow Everton to play against Guadalajara at the Copa Libertadores (25 February).

16 May 2009 17	Palestino	1–0	Colo-Colo	Ñuñoa, Santiago
16:00 UTC−4	Tapia 27'	Report		Stadium: Nacional; Attendance: 5,000; Referee: Claudio Puga

Results summary

Overall								Home						Away					
Pld	W	D	L	GF	GA	GD	Pts	W	D	L	GF	GA	GD	W	D	L	GF	GA	GD
17	5	4	8	28	28	0	19	3	3	2	16	11	+5	2	1	6	12	17	−5

Last updated: 21 May 2009.
Source: El Mercurio

=== Torneo Clausura ===
==== Standings ====
Pos	Team	Pld	W	D	L	GF	GA	GD	Pts
11	Universidad de Concepción	17	6	5	6	24	25	−1	23
12	Ñublense	17	5	5	7	16	23	−7	20
13	Colo-Colo	17	5	4	8	28	28	0	19
14	Curicó Unido	17	5	4	8	24	28	−4	19
15	Cobresal	17	4	7	6	23	34	−11	19

Updated to match(es) played on May 21, 2009. Source: RSSSF
Rules for classification: 1st points; 2nd wins; 3rd goal difference; 4th goals scored; 5th away goals

Pos	Team	Pld	W	D	L	GF	GA	GD	Pts	Qualification
2	Deportes La Serena	17	11	0	6	31	19	+12	33	Playoffs
3	Audax Italiano	17	9	5	3	26	22	+4	32	Playoffs
4	Colo-Colo	17	8	4	5	28	19	+9	28	Playoffs
5	Universidad de Concepción	17	8	3	6	23	23	0	27	Playoffs
6	Santiago Morning	17	8	2	7	22	25	−3	26	Playoffs

Updated to match(es) played on November 8, 2009. Source: RSSSF
Rules for classification: 1st points; 2nd wins; 3rd goal difference; 4th goals scored; 5th away goals

==== Regular stage ====
12 July 2009 1	Colo-Colo	1–1	Curicó Unido	Macul, Santiago
16:00 UTC−4	Morquio 90+4' (o.g.)	Report	Páez 46'; Parada (red card) 90+2'	Stadium: Monumental; Attendance: 25,000; Referee: Claudio Puga

18 July 2009 2	Colo-Colo	2–1	Deportes La Serena	Macul, Santiago
18:00 UTC−4	Barrios 10'; Paredes 81'	Report	F. Rojas 67'	Stadium: Monumental; Attendance: 30,000; Referee: Carlos Chandía

25 July 2009 3	Universidad de Concepción	1–3	Colo-Colo	Concepción
17:00 UTC−4	Vargas 58' (pen.)	Report	Paredes 25', 48', 90+3'	Stadium: Collao; Attendance: 22,900; Referee: Pablo Pozo

2 August 2009 4	Colo-Colo	0–1	Audax Italiano	Macul, Santiago
15:30 UTC−4		Report	Medel 27'; Yáñez (red card) 78'	Stadium: Monumental; Attendance: 35,000; Referee: Patricio Polic

8 August 2009 5	Santiago Morning	2–1	Colo-Colo	Macul, Santiago
15:00 UTC−4	Comba 5', 55'	Report	Bogado 68'	Stadium: Monumental; Attendance: 4,632; Referee: Eduardo Gamboa

16 August 2009 6	Colo-Colo	3–0	Rangers	Macul, Santiago
15:30 UTC−4	Miralles 32', 47'; Paredes 72'	Report	Millape (red card) 54'	Stadium: Monumental; Attendance: 13,932; Referee: Eduardo Gamboa

22 August 2009 7	O'Higgins	2–2	Colo-Colo	Rancagua
15:30 UTC−4	Meneses 44' (pen.), 60' (pen.)	Report	Riffo 38'; Millar (red card) 61'; Miralles 89'	Stadium: El Teniente; Attendance: 14,159; Referee: Pablo Pozo

29 August 2009 8	Universidad Católica	2–1	Colo-Colo	Ñuñoa, Santiago
16:00 UTC−4	Mirošević 72' (pen.), 77'	Report	Magalhães 60'; Olate (red card) 72'	Stadium: Nacional; Attendance: 23,479; Referee: Enrique Osses

13 September 2009 9	Colo-Colo	1–1	Unión Española	Macul, Santiago
18:30 UTC−4	Salcedo 90+2'	Report	Aravena 76'	Stadium: Monumental; Attendance: 15,000; Referee: Julio Bascuñán

20 September 2009 10	Municipal Iquique	1–1	Colo-Colo	Iquique
16:00 UTC−4	Campozano 34'	Report	Taucare 42' (o.g.)	Stadium: Tierra de Campeones; Attendance: 10,434; Referee: Eduardo Gamboa

24 September 2009 11	Everton	3–2	Colo-Colo	Viña del Mar
20:00 UTC−4	Riveros 2'; Rey 23' (o.g.); Guevgeozián 76'	Report	Miralles 11'; Magalhães 75'	Stadium: Sausalito; Attendance: 13,000; Referee: Eduardo Ponce

27 September 2009 12	Colo-Colo	3–1	Ñublense	Macul, Santiago
18:30 UTC−4	Miralles 46', 66', 68'	Report	Ramos 31'	Stadium: Monumental; Attendance: 8,000; Referee: Álvaro García

3 October 2009 13	Colo-Colo	1–0	Universidad de Chile	Macul, Santiago
16:00 UTC−4	Paredes 57'	Report	Olarra (red card) 85'	Stadium: Monumental; Attendance: 40,000; Referee: Pablo Pozo

18 October 2009 14	Huachipato	0–2	Colo-Colo	Talcahuano
16:00 UTC−3		Report	Bogado 69'; Torres 75'	Stadium: CAP; Attendance: 7,000; Referee: Eduardo Ponce

24 October 2009 15	Colo-Colo	2–1	Cobreloa	Macul, Santiago
19:30 UTC−3	Miralles 6'; Tordoya 43' (o.g.)	Report	Salinas 83'	Stadium: Monumental; Attendance: 10,579; Referee: Claudio Puga

31 October 2009 16	Cobresal	0–2	Colo-Colo	El Salvador
16:00 UTC−3		Report	Bogado 43'; Millar 88'	Stadium: El Cobre; Attendance: 8,000; Referee: Patricio Polic

7 November 2009 17	Colo-Colo	1–2	Palestino	Macul, Santiago
17:00 UTC−3	Araos 62'	Report	Ibáñez 13', 58'	Stadium: Monumental; Attendance: 18,000; Referee: Eduardo Gamboa

Results summary

Overall								Home						Away					
Pld	W	D	L	GF	GA	GD	Pts	W	D	L	GF	GA	GD	W	D	L	GF	GA	GD
17	8	4	5	28	19	+9	28	5	2	2	14	8	+6	3	2	3	14	11	+3

Last updated: 8 November 2009.
Source: El Mercurio

==== Play-offs ====
Quarter-finals

22 November 2009 Leg 1	Universidad de Concepción	1–2	Colo-Colo	Talcahuano
17:00	Vargas 35' (pen.)	Report	Aránguiz 71'; Miralles 85' (pen.)	Stadium: CAP; Attendance: 7,000; Referee: Julio Bascuñán

25 November 2009 Leg 2	Colo-Colo	4–3 (6–4 agg.)	Universidad de Concepción	Macul, Santiago
21:15	Aránguiz 12'; Bogado 18'; Giménez 36' (o.g.); Millar 90+3'	Report	Vargas 2', 33' (pen.), 53' (pen.)	Stadium: Monumental; Attendance: 22,000; Referee: Jorge Osorio

Semi-finals

29 November 2009 Leg 1	Colo-Colo	1–0	Deportes La Serena	Macul, Santiago
19:30	Paredes 55'	Report		Stadium: Monumental; Attendance: 30,000; Referee: Carlos Chandía

2 December 2009 Leg 2	Deportes La Serena	0–3 (0–4 agg.)	Colo-Colo	La Serena
21:45		Report	Torres 23', 49'; Miralles 57'	Stadium: La Portada; Attendance: 15,000; Referee: Pablo Pozo

Finals

5 December 2009 Leg 1	Colo-Colo	2–2	Universidad Católica	Macul, Santiago
19:00	Miralles 9'; Zenteno 75' (o.g.)	Report	Mirošević 70' (pen.); Martínez 88'	Stadium: Monumental; Attendance: 45,000; Referee: Carlos Chandía

9 December 2009 Leg 2	Universidad Católica	2–4 (4–6 agg.)	Colo-Colo	Independencia, Santiago
18:00	Valenzuela 1'; Gutiérrez 65'	Report	Aránguiz 13'; Paredes 33', 66'; Bogado 90'	Stadium: Santa Laura; Attendance: 17,000; Referee: Pablo Pozo

=== Copa Chile ===
5 August 2009 Fourth Round	CF Rapa Nui	0–4	Colo-Colo	Easter Island
16:00 UTC−6		Report	Álvaro Sánchez 30' (o.g.); Bogado 32', 59'; Araos 70' (pen.)	Stadium: Hanga Roa Stadium; Attendance: 3,000; Referee: Carlos Chandía

16 September 2009 Fifth Round	Deportes Temuco	0–4	Colo-Colo	Temuco
22:00 UTC−4		Report	Bogado 8', 39'; Paredes 13'; Magalhães 74'	Stadium: Germán Becker; Attendance: 15,000; Referee: Carlos Chandía

7 October 2009 Round of 16	Lota Schwager	0–1	Colo-Colo	Concepción
22:00 UTC−4		Report	Miralles 65'	Stadium: Collao; Attendance: 15,000; Referee: Patricio Polic

21 October 2009 Quarter-finals	Unión San Felipe	1–1 (6–5 p)	Colo-Colo	San Felipe
22:00 UTC−3	Enzo Vargas 85' (pen.)	Report	Aránguiz 34'	Stadium: Municipal; Attendance: 6,000; Referee: Jorge Osorio
	Penalties
	Pérez (penalty scored); Piña (penalty scored); Aravena (penalty missed); Ormazábal (penalty scored); Vildozo (penalty scored); Toloza (penalty scored); Luis Quijanes (penalty scored)		(penalty scored) Rey; (penalty scored) Aránguiz; (penalty scored) Paredes; (penalty missed) Millar; (penalty scored) Torres; (penalty scored) Olate; (penalty missed) Pavez

=== Copa Libertadores ===
Pos	Team	Pld	W	D	L	GF	GA	GD	Pts	(Brazil) RFE	(Brazil) PAL	(Chile) CC	(Ecuador) LDU
1	(Brazil) Sport Recife	6	4	1	1	10	7	+3	13	—	0–2	2–1	2–0
2	(Brazil) Palmeiras	6	3	1	2	9	7	+2	10	1–1	—	1–3	2–0
3	(Chile) Colo-Colo	6	2	1	3	9	7	+2	7	1–2	0–1	—	3–0
4	(Ecuador) LDU Quito	6	1	1	4	6	13	−7	4	2–3	3–2	1–1	—

Source: RSSSF

18 February 2009 Matchday 1	Colo-Colo (Chile)	1–2	(Brazil) Sport Recife	Santiago, Chile
21:50 UTC−3	Barrios 70'	Report	Ciro 6'; Wilson 44'	Stadium: Monumental; Attendance: 23,427; Referee: Saúl Laverni (Argentina)

3 March 2009 Matchday 2	Palmeiras (Brazil)	1–3	(Chile) Colo-Colo	São Paulo, Brazil
20:00 UTC−3	Keirrison 70'	Report	Barrios 43'; Meléndez (red card) 49'; Torres 53'; González 77'	Stadium: Parque Antártica; Attendance: 23,285; Referee: Sergio Pezzotta (Argentina)

12 March 2009 Matchday 3	Colo-Colo (Chile)	3–0	(Ecuador) LDU Quito	Santiago, Chile
21:15 UTC−4	Carranza 56'; Cereceda 61'; Barrios 65'	Report		Stadium: Monumental; Attendance: 35,000; Referee: Carlos Amarilla (Paraguay)

9 April 2009 Matchday 4	LDU Quito (Ecuador)	1–1	(Chile) Colo-Colo	Quito, Ecuador
15:00 UTC−5	Campos 47'	Report	Bieler 90+1' (o.g.)	Stadium: Casa Blanca; Attendance: 25,000; Referee: Benito Archundia (Mexico)

22 April 2009 Matchday 5	Sport Recife (Brazil)	2–1	(Chile) Colo-Colo	Recife, Brazil
21:50 UTC−3	Moacir 59'; Vandinho 75'	Report	Millar 50'	Stadium: Ilha do Retiro; Attendance: 20,050; Referee: Héctor Baldassi (Argentina)

29 April 2009 Matchday 6	Colo-Colo (Chile)	0–1	(Brazil) Palmeiras	Santiago, Chile
20:50 UTC−4		Report	Marcão (red card) 62'; Cleiton Xavier 86'	Stadium: Monumental; Attendance: 31,038; Referee: Carlos Torres (Paraguay)

=== Friendlies and other matches ===
23 January 2009 Copa Entel PCS	Colo-Colo	0–3	Universidad Católica	Temuco
22:00 UTC−3	Moya (red card) 30'; Cabrera (red card) 39'; Sanhueza (red card) 80'	Report	Toloza 74' (pen.); Núñez 76', 83'	Stadium: Germán Becker; Attendance: 17,000; Referee: Álvaro García

28 January 2009 Noche Alba	Colo-Colo	1–3	(Argentina) Newell's Old Boys	Macul, Santiago
22:00 UTC−3	Barrios 64'	Report	Insaurralde 15'; Armani 30'; Sperduti 53'	Stadium: Monumental; Attendance: 25,000

3 July 2009 Mid-season friendly	Municipal Iquique	1–1 (6–7 p)	Colo-Colo	Iquique
22:00 UTC−4	Ramos 29'	Report	Araos 19'; Torres (red card) 28'	Stadium: Tierra de Campeones; Attendance: 10,000

12 August 2009 Copa Gato	Colo-Colo	1–2	Universidad de Chile	Antofagasta
22:00 UTC−4	Bogado 90+1'	Report	Olivera 44' (pen.); Rojas 83'	Stadium: Regional; Attendance: 25,000

8 September 2009 Copa Ciudad de La Serena	Deportes La Serena	1–3	Colo-Colo	La Serena
22:00 UTC−4	Bolados 41'	Report	Miralles 8'; Torres 16'; Bogado 71' (pen.); Gazale (red card); Meléndez (red card)	Stadium: La Portada; Attendance: 5,000; Referee: Francisco Caamaño
