= Avendaño =

Avendaño is a Spanish surname. It is believed to have originated in Galicia, then passed to the Basque Country, and later spread to other areas of Spain and Portugal as well as Latin America.

== People ==
Notable people with the surname include:

- Dr. Diego Núñez de Avendaño, Peruvian 16th century judge and, briefly, viceroy of Peru
- Diego de Avendaño, Spanish-Peruvian 17th century Jesuit academic
- Fernando Avendaño, Peruvian 17th century priest
- Guillermo Flores Avendaño, President of Guatemala briefly in 1957–58
- Hugo Avendaño, Mexican singer and actor
- Jaime Abdul Gutiérrez Avendaño, Salvadoran military officer
- Jorge Avendaño, Mexican pianist, composer, songwriter and music producer
- Juan Avendaño, Spanish tennis player
- Juan Pablo Avendaño, Argentine footballer
- Manuel Avendaño, Chilean footballer
- Nazareth Avendaño, Costa Rican diplomat
- Pedro de Avendaño, Spanish conquistador
- Pedro Medina Avendaño, Colombian poet
- Serafín Avendaño, Spanish painter
- Víctor Avendaño, Argentine boxer
- Justin Avendano, Cricketer

== Famous Criminals ==
- The Avendaño brothers of the 2017 Netflix and Univision series, El Chapo, based on the real-life drug lords of the Tijuana drug cartel (a.k.a. the Arellano-Félix Organization):
  - Benjamín Arellano Félix
  - Ramón Arellano Félix
