= 2024 Campeonato Nacional Primera División =

Campeonato Nacional
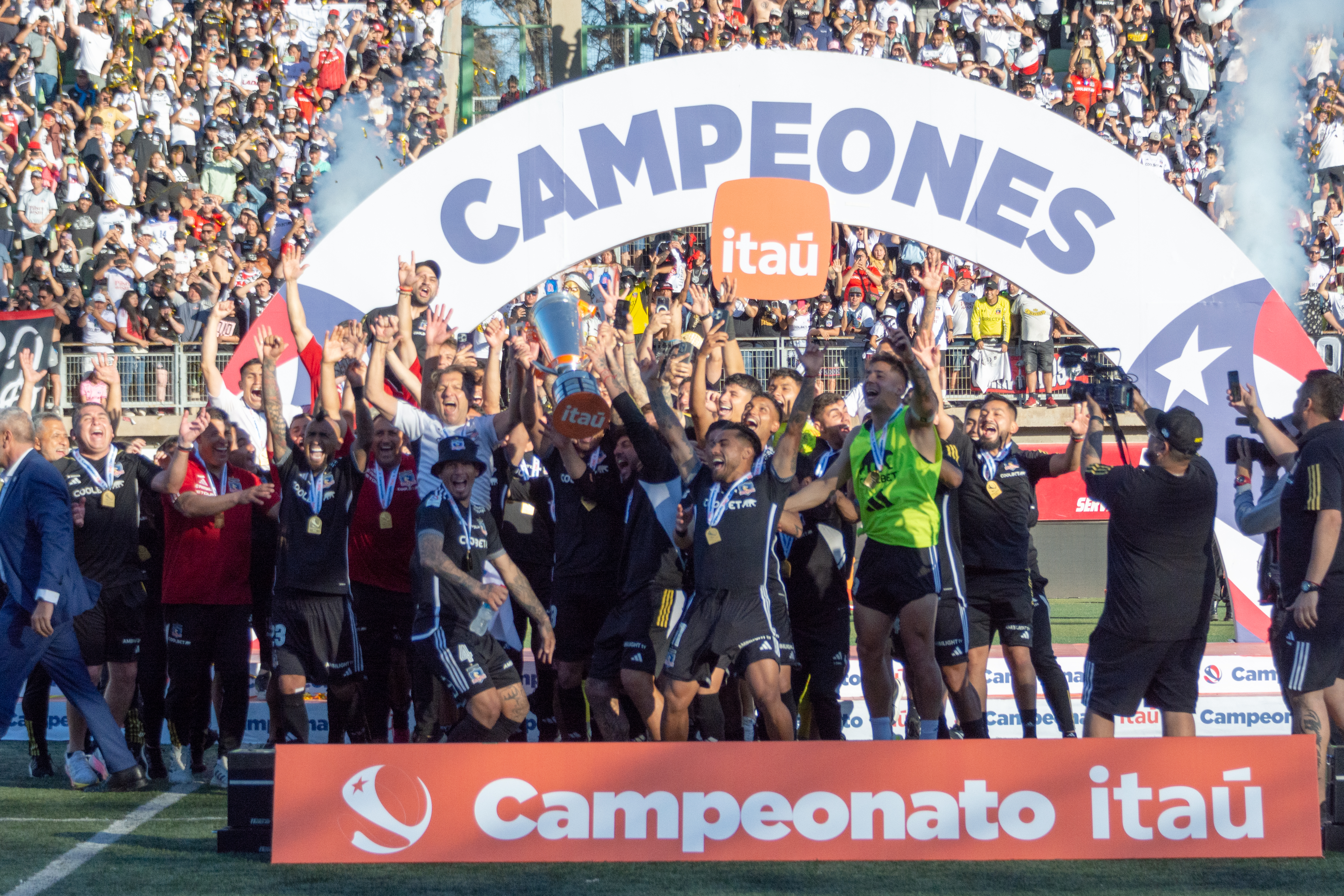
- Colo-Colo lifting up their thirty-fourth league title.
- Season: 2024
- Dates: 16 February – 10 November 2024
- Champions: Colo-Colo (34th title)
- Relegated: Cobreloa; Deportes Copiapó
- Copa Libertadores: Colo-Colo; Universidad de Chile; Deportes Iquique; Ñublense (via Copa Chile)
- Copa Sudamericana: Palestino; Universidad Católica; Unión Española; Everton
- Matches: 240
- Goals: 666 (2.78 per match)
- Top goalscorer: Fernando Zampedri (19 goals)
- Biggest home win: Ñublense 6–0 Cobreloa (27 April)
- Biggest away win: O'Higgins 0–5 Audax Italiano (5 May)
- Highest scoring: Unión Española 5–3 Ñublense (31 March); Unión Española 5–3 Dep. Copiapó (21 April); Dep. Copiapó 3–5 Everton (20 October)
- Highest attendance: 44,987 (U. de Chile vs. Colo-Colo)
- Total attendance: 1,888,569
- Average attendance: 7,869

The 2024 Campeonato Nacional de la Primera División del Fútbol Profesional Chileno, known as Campeonato Itaú 2024 for sponsorship purposes, was the 94th season of the Campeonato Nacional, Chile's top-flight football league. The season began on 16 February and ended on 10 November 2024.

Colo-Colo won their thirty-fourth league title in this tournament, clinching the championship with a 1–1 draw with Deportes Copiapó and another 1–1 draw for Universidad de Chile against Everton on the final day of the season. Huachipato were the defending champions.

== Teams ==
Locations of the 2024 Chilean Primera División teams.
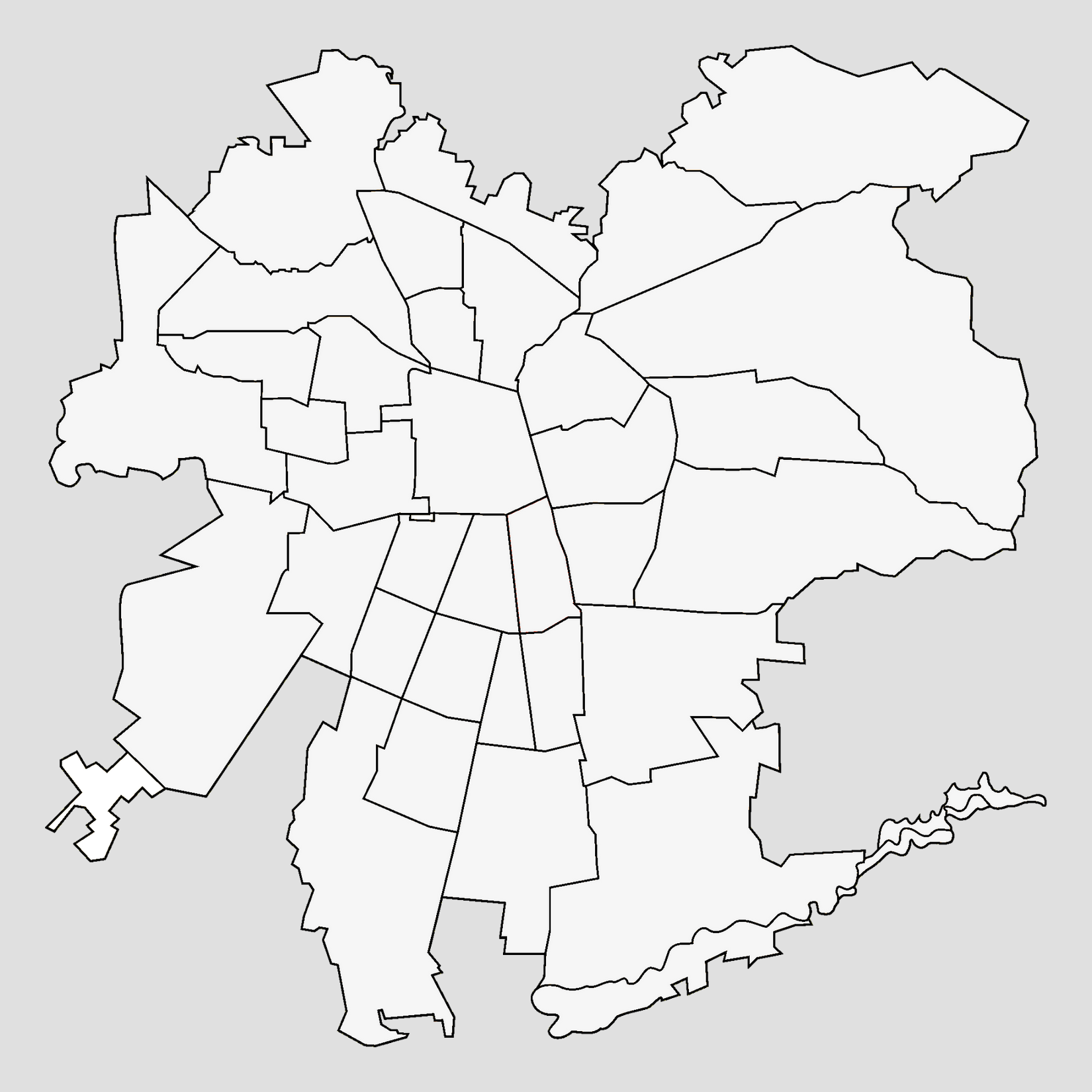
Locations of the 2024 Chilean Primera División teams – Santiago.

16 teams took part in the league in this season: the top 14 teams from the 2023 tournament, plus the 2023 Primera B champions Cobreloa and the winners of the promotion play-off Deportes Iquique. Cobreloa secured promotion to the top tier after eight years on 15 October 2023, winning the Primera B tournament with a 2–1 over Rangers, whilst Deportes Iquique sealed their promotion after three seasons on 10 December 2023 by defeating Santiago Wanderers in the promotion play-off finals. The promoted teams replaced Curicó Unido and Magallanes, who were relegated to Primera B at the end of the 2023 season.

=== Stadia and locations ===
| Team | City | Stadium | Capacity |
|---|---|---|---|
| Audax Italiano | Santiago (La Florida) | Bicentenario de La Florida | 12,000 |
| Cobreloa | Calama | Zorros del Desierto | 12,102 |
| Cobresal | El Salvador | El Cobre | 12,000 |
| Colo-Colo | Santiago (Macul) | Monumental David Arellano | 47,347 |
| Coquimbo Unido | Coquimbo | Francisco Sánchez Rumoroso | 18,750 |
| Deportes Copiapó | Copiapó | Luis Valenzuela Hermosilla | 8,000 |
| Deportes Iquique | Iquique | Tierra de Campeones | 13,171 |
| Everton | Viña del Mar | Sausalito | 22,360 |
| Huachipato | Talcahuano | Huachipato-CAP Acero | 10,500 |
| Ñublense | Chillán | Nelson Oyarzún Arenas | 12,000 |
| O'Higgins | Rancagua | El Teniente | 13,849 |
| Palestino | Santiago (La Cisterna) | Municipal de La Cisterna | 8,000 |
| Unión Española | Santiago (Independencia) | Santa Laura-Universidad SEK | 19,000 |
| Unión La Calera | La Calera | Nicolás Chahuán Nazar | 9,200 |
| Universidad Católica | Santiago (Las Condes) | San Carlos de Apoquindo (Note: Universidad Católica play their home matches at Estadio Santa Laura-Universidad SEK in Santiago since Estadio San Carlos de Apoquindo is closed for remodeling works.) | 14,118 |
| Universidad de Chile | Santiago (Ñuñoa) | Nacional Julio Martínez Prádanos | 48,665 |

=== Personnel and kits ===
| Team | Manager | Kit manufacturer | Main shirt sponsors |
|---|---|---|---|
| Audax Italiano | (Chile) Juan José Ribera | Macron | Traverso |
| Cobreloa | (Chile) César Bravo | KS7 | Finning |
| Cobresal | (Chile) Gustavo Huerta | KS7 | Huilco |
| Colo-Colo | (Argentina) Jorge Almirón | Adidas | Coolbet |
| Coquimbo Unido | (Chile) Esteban González (caretaker) | Capelli Sport | RojaBet |
| Deportes Copiapó | (Argentina) Hernán Caputto | Claus-7 | Kinross |
| Deportes Iquique | (Chile) Miguel Ramírez | Rete | Collahuasi |
| Everton | (Argentina) Esteban Solari | Charly | Claro, MallMarina |
| Huachipato | (Spain) Igor Oca | Marathon | Novibet |
| Ñublense | (Chile) Mario Salas | Capelli Sport | JugaBet |
| O'Higgins | (Chile) Víctor Fuentes | Joma | LatamWin |
| Palestino | (Argentina) Lucas Bovaglio | Capelli Sport | Bank of Palestine |
| Unión Española | (Chile) José Luis Sierra | Kappa | Universidad SEK, Starken, SsangYong |
| Unión La Calera | (Argentina) Walter Lemma | Givova | GWM, Suzuval |
| Universidad Católica | (Brazil) Tiago Nunes | Puma | BICE |
| Universidad de Chile | (Argentina) Gustavo Álvarez | Adidas | JugaBet |

=== Managerial changes ===
| Team | Outgoing manager | Manner of departure | Date of vacancy | Position in table | Incoming manager | Date of appointment |
|---|---|---|---|---|---|---|
| Unión La Calera | (Argentina) Martín Cicotello | End of contract | 9 December 2023 | Pre-season | (Argentina) Manuel Fernández | 5 January 2024 |
| Universidad de Chile | (Argentina) Mauricio Pellegrino | End of contract | 9 December 2023 | Pre-season | (Argentina) Gustavo Álvarez | 23 December 2023 |
| Unión Española | (Chile) Ronald Fuentes | End of contract | 10 December 2023 | Pre-season | (Chile) Miguel Ponce | 20 December 2023 |
| Deportes Iquique | (Chile) Miguel Ponce | End of contract | 12 December 2023 | Pre-season | (Chile) Miguel Ramírez | 15 December 2023 |
| Ñublense | (Argentina) Hernán Caputto | End of contract | 13 December 2023 | Pre-season | (Chile) Mario Salas | 23 December 2023 |
| Audax Italiano | (Chile) Francisco Arrué | Sacked | 14 December 2023 | Pre-season | (Argentina) Walter Erviti | 30 December 2023 |
| Colo-Colo | (Bolivia) Gustavo Quinteros | Mutual agreement | 15 December 2023 | Pre-season | (Argentina) Jorge Almirón | 4 January 2024 |
| Huachipato | (Argentina) Gustavo Álvarez | Signed by Universidad de Chile | 22 December 2023 | Pre-season | (Argentina) Javier Sanguinetti | 27 December 2023 |
| Universidad Católica | (Chile) Nicolás Núñez | Sacked | 7 March 2024 | 10th | (Chile) Rodrigo Valenzuela (Note: Caretaker manager.) | 7 March 2024 |
| Everton | (Argentina) Francisco Meneghini | Sacked | 10 March 2024 | 14th | (Chile) Davis González | 10 March 2024 |
| Audax Italiano | (Argentina) Walter Erviti | Resigned | 12 March 2024 | 14th | (Chile) Nelson Tapia | 12 March 2024 |
| Everton | (Chile) Davis González | End of caretaker spell | 14 March 2024 | 9th | (Argentina) Esteban Solari | 14 March 2024 |
| Audax Italiano | (Chile) Nelson Tapia | End of caretaker spell | 21 March 2024 | 14th | (Chile) Francisco Arrué | 21 March 2024 |
| Universidad Católica | (Chile) Rodrigo Valenzuela | End of caretaker spell | 22 March 2024 | 12th | (Brazil) Tiago Nunes | 22 March 2024 |
| O'Higgins | (Argentina) Juan Manuel Azconzábal | Mutual agreement | 6 May 2024 | 10th | (Chile) Víctor Fuentes (Note: Originally as caretaker manager, appointed on a permanent basis on 9 May 2024.) | 6 May 2024 |
| Cobreloa | (Chile) Emiliano Astorga | Mutual agreement | 6 May 2024 | 11th | (Chile) Nelson Soto and (Palestine) Pablo Abdala | 7 May 2024 |
| Huachipato | (Argentina) Javier Sanguinetti | Mutual agreement | 20 May 2024 | 12th | (Chile) Francisco Troncoso | 20 May 2024 |
| Cobreloa | (Chile) Nelson Soto and (Palestine) Pablo Abdala | End of caretaker spell | 26 May 2024 | 13th | (Argentina) Dalcio Giovagnoli | 26 May 2024 |
| Unión La Calera | (Argentina) Manuel Fernández | Mutual agreement | 27 May 2024 | 16th | (Argentina) Walter Lemma (Note: Carlos Galdames was the caretaker manager for the 2024 Copa Sudamericana group stage round 6 match.) | 28 May 2024 |
| Palestino | (Argentina) Pablo Sánchez | Resigned | 19 June 2024 | 5th | (Argentina) Lucas Bovaglio (Note: Jorge Schwager was the caretaker manager for both legs of the 2024 Copa Chile regional quarter-finals.) | 26 June 2024 |
| Audax Italiano | (Chile) Francisco Arrué | Sacked | 22 July 2024 | 15th | (Chile) Juan José Ribera | 24 July 2024 |
| Huachipato | (Chile) Francisco Troncoso | End of caretaker spell | 25 July 2024 | 11th | (Spain) Igor Oca | 25 July 2024 |
| Deportes Copiapó | (Chile) Ivo Basay | Mutual agreement | 2 September 2024 | 16th | (Argentina) Hernán Caputto | 4 September 2024 |
| Unión Española | (Chile) Miguel Ponce | Sacked | 3 September 2024 | 8th | (Chile) José Luis Sierra | 4 September 2024 |
| Cobreloa | (Argentina) Dalcio Giovagnoli | Sacked | 30 September 2024 | 15th | (Chile) César Bravo | 30 September 2024 |
| Coquimbo Unido | (Chile) Fernando Díaz | Sacked | 14 October 2024 | 8th | (Chile) Esteban González | 14 October 2024 |

== Standings ==
| Pos | Team | Pld | W | D | L | GF | GA | GD | Pts | Qualification or relegation |
|---|---|---|---|---|---|---|---|---|---|---|
| 1 | Colo-Colo (C) | 30 | 21 | 4 | 5 | 49 | 21 | +28 | 67 | Qualification for Copa Libertadores group stage |
| 2 | Universidad de Chile | 30 | 19 | 8 | 3 | 53 | 24 | +29 | 65 | Qualification for Copa Libertadores group stage |
| 3 | Deportes Iquique | 30 | 14 | 6 | 10 | 53 | 48 | +5 | 48 | Qualification for Copa Libertadores second stage |
| 4 | Palestino | 30 | 13 | 7 | 10 | 46 | 33 | +13 | 46 | Qualification for Copa Sudamericana first stage |
| 5 | Universidad Católica | 30 | 13 | 7 | 10 | 44 | 34 | +10 | 46 | Qualification for Copa Sudamericana first stage |
| 6 | Unión Española | 30 | 13 | 6 | 11 | 53 | 45 | +8 | 45 | Qualification for Copa Sudamericana first stage |
| 7 | Everton | 30 | 12 | 9 | 9 | 47 | 41 | +6 | 45 | Qualification for Copa Sudamericana first stage |
| 8 | Coquimbo Unido | 30 | 12 | 9 | 9 | 37 | 34 | +3 | 45 | |
| 9 | Ñublense | 30 | 11 | 7 | 12 | 40 | 34 | +6 | 40 | Qualification for Copa Libertadores second stage (Note: Ñublense qualified for the Copa Libertadores second stage as 2024 Copa Chile runners-up, since champions Universidad de Chile qualified for the Copa Libertadores group stage through league performance.) |
| 10 | Audax Italiano | 30 | 10 | 4 | 16 | 36 | 39 | −3 | 34 | |
| 11 | Unión La Calera | 30 | 9 | 7 | 14 | 29 | 40 | −11 | 34 | |
| 12 | Huachipato | 30 | 9 | 7 | 14 | 28 | 44 | −16 | 34 | |
| 13 | Cobresal | 30 | 8 | 9 | 13 | 42 | 51 | −9 | 33 | |
| 14 | O'Higgins | 30 | 8 | 7 | 15 | 34 | 53 | −19 | 31 | |
| 15 | Cobreloa (R) | 30 | 9 | 4 | 17 | 33 | 62 | −29 | 31 | Relegation to Primera B |
| 16 | Deportes Copiapó (R) | 30 | 7 | 3 | 20 | 40 | 61 | −21 | 24 | Relegation to Primera B |

Source: ANFP, Soccerway
Rules for classification: 1) Points, 2) Playoff game (only if needed to decide championship between two teams), 3) Goal difference, 4) Matches won, 5) Goals for, 6) Away goals for, 7) Red cards, 8) Yellow cards, 9) Drawing of lots.
(C) Champions; (R) Relegated

== Results ==
| Home \ Away | AUD | COB | CSL | CC | COQ | CDC | IQQ | EVE | HUA | ÑUB | OHI | PAL | UE | ULC | UC | UCH |
|---|---|---|---|---|---|---|---|---|---|---|---|---|---|---|---|---|
| Audax Italiano | — | 2–0 | 0–1 | 1–4 | 0–1 | 4–1 | 2–3 | 1–2 | 0–2 | 0–1 | 2–0 | 1–2 | 1–1 | 2–2 | 2–1 | 1–0 |
| Cobreloa | 0–3 | — | 2–1 | 0–1 | 1–0 | 4–1 | 2–2 | 1–2 | 1–1 | 0–1 | 0–4 | 3–1 | 1–0 | 2–0 | 2–2 | 1–3 |
| Cobresal | 0–1 | 3–2 | — | 2–2 | 2–3 | 3–0 | 2–1 | 2–1 | 1–2 | 2–2 | 3–1 | 0–2 | 2–2 | 2–1 | 3–1 | 3–3 |
| Colo-Colo | 2–1 | 0–2 | 2–0 | — | 2–0 | 0–1 | 3–0 | 4–1 | 2–0 | 2–1 | 2–1 | 2–0 | 2–1 | 3–1 | 1–0 | 0–1 |
| Coquimbo Unido | 1–1 | 2–1 | 2–0 | 0–0 | — | 3–1 | 1–2 | 2–2 | 3–1 | 1–0 | 2–0 | 0–0 | 2–2 | 0–0 | 2–0 | 0–1 |
| Deportes Copiapó | 2–1 | 4–0 | 2–2 | 1–1 | 3–0 | — | 3–0 | 3–5 | 0–2 | 0–1 | 1–3 | 2–1 | 2–3 | 2–0 | 0–1 | 1–3 |
| Deportes Iquique | 2–1 | 4–1 | 1–0 | 0–3 | 4–2 | 2–1 | — | 1–1 | 3–1 | 2–1 | 1–3 | 2–1 | 2–0 | 1–1 | 2–3 | 3–0 |
| Everton | 2–0 | 2–0 | 3–3 | 0–1 | 1–2 | 1–0 | 1–1 | — | 1–0 | 3–2 | 1–1 | 0–0 | 3–2 | 0–1 | 0–0 | 1–2 |
| Huachipato | 0–1 | 1–1 | 0–0 | 1–2 | 3–2 | 2–1 | 2–1 | 1–0 | — | 1–0 | 1–0 | 2–2 | 2–2 | 0–1 | 0–0 | 0–4 |
| Ñublense | 1–2 | 6–0 | 1–0 | 3–0 | 0–0 | 1–0 | 2–0 | 1–1 | 3–0 | — | 2–2 | 0–2 | 0–0 | 0–1 | 1–2 | 1–4 |
| O'Higgins | 0–5 | 0–3 | 2–2 | 1–0 | 1–1 | 2–0 | 0–3 | 2–1 | 0–0 | 1–3 | — | 0–1 | 2–2 | 1–1 | 0–2 | 0–4 |
| Palestino | 2–0 | 5–0 | 3–0 | 2–3 | 2–0 | 3–1 | 2–0 | 1–4 | 2–0 | 1–1 | 4–1 | — | 0–1 | 0–0 | 0–2 | 2–2 |
| Unión Española | 3–0 | 3–0 | 2–1 | 0–3 | 1–0 | 5–3 | 4–3 | 4–2 | 3–1 | 5–3 | 0–1 | 2–3 | — | 0–1 | 1–2 | 0–1 |
| Unión La Calera | 2–1 | 0–2 | 3–0 (Note: Match abandoned after 89 minutes of play due to incidents by Unión La Calera fans.) | 0–1 | 1–2 | 3–3 | 1–3 | 0–1 | 2–1 | 2–1 | 2–3 | 2–1 | 0–2 | — | 0–0 | 1–3 |
| Universidad Católica | 0–0 | 4–1 | 2–0 | 0–1 | 1–2 | 4–1 | 2–2 | 2–4 | 4–0 | 0–1 | 3–2 | 1–1 | 0–2 | 2–0 | — | 1–2 |
| Universidad de Chile | 1–0 | 4–0 | 2–2 | 0–0 | 1–1 | 1–0 | 2–2 | 1–1 | 2–1 | 0–0 | 1–0 | 1–0 | 2–0 | 1–0 | 1–2 | — |

Source: ANFP, Soccerway
Legend: Blue = home team win; Yellow = draw; Red = away team win.

== Top scorers ==
| Rank | Player | Club | Goals |
|---|---|---|---|
| 1 | (Argentina) Fernando Zampedri | Universidad Católica | 19 |
| 2 | (Argentina) Rodrigo Contreras | Everton | 16 |
| 3 | (Chile) Steffan Pino | Deportes Iquique | 13 |
| 4 | (Chile) Ignacio Jeraldino | Audax Italiano | 12 |
| 5 | (Argentina) Leandro Fernández | Universidad de Chile | 11 |
| 5 | (Uruguay) Cristian Palacios | Universidad de Chile | 11 |
| 7 | (Chile) Bryan Carrasco | Palestino | 9 |
| 7 | (Argentina) Franco Frías | Unión Española | 9 |
| 7 | (Argentina) Maximiliano Quinteros | Deportes Copiapó | 9 |
| 7 | (Chile) Patricio Rubio | Ñublense | 9 |
| 7 | (Chile) Gonzalo Tapia | Universidad Católica | 9 |
| 7 | (Chile) Leonardo Valencia | Cobresal | 9 |

Source: Soccerway

== Season awards ==
On 11 November 2024, a ceremony was held by the league's broadcaster TNT Sports to announce the winners of the season awards, who were chosen based on voting by fans, local sports journalists, and captains and managers of the Primera División teams.

| Award | Winner | Club |
|---|---|---|
| Player of the Year (Jugador Crack 2024) | (Argentina) Fernando Zampedri | Universidad Católica |
| Manager of the Year | (Argentina) Gustavo Álvarez | Universidad de Chile |
| Top goalscorer (Goleador Experto Easy) | (Argentina) Fernando Zampedri | Universidad Católica |
| Te Quiero Ver Campeón Award | (Chile) Arturo Vidal | Colo-Colo |
| Best Save | (Chile) Brayan Cortés (against Audax Italiano) | Colo-Colo |
| Best Goal | (Argentina) Fernando Zampedri (against Universidad de Chile) | Universidad Católica |
| Legend Award (Premio Leyenda) | (Chile) Elías Figueroa | |
| Best U-21 Player | (Chile) Lucas Cepeda | Colo-Colo |
| Best Referee | José Cabero | |

=== Team of the Season ===

Team of the Season
| Goalkeeper | Defenders | Midfielders | Forwards |
|---|---|---|---|
| (Chile) Brayan Cortés (Colo-Colo) | Fabián Hormazábal (Universidad de Chile) (Uruguay) Alan Saldivia (Colo-Colo); Matías Zaldivia (Universidad de Chile); Marcelo Morales (Universidad de Chile) | (Chile) Arturo Vidal (Colo-Colo) (Chile) Esteban Pavez (Colo-Colo) (Chile) Carlos Palacios (Colo-Colo) | Maximiliano Guerrero (Universidad de Chile) (Argentina) Fernando Zampedri (Universidad Católica); Edson Puch (Deportes Iquique) |

== Attendances ==
| # | Football club | Average attendance |
|---|---|---|
| 1 | Universidad de Chile | 36,767 |
| 2 | Colo-Colo | 27,092 |
| 3 | Universidad Católica | 9,225 |
| 4 | Deportes Iquique | 9,023 |
| 5 | Coquimbo Unido | 6,393 |
| 6 | O'Higgins | 5,716 |
| 7 | Cobreloa | 5,591 |
| 8 | Everton | 5,518 |
| 9 | Ñublense | 4,967 |
| 10 | Unión Española | 4,199 |
| 11 | Deportes Copiapó | 3,098 |
| 12 | Huachipato | 2,751 |
| 13 | Unión La Calera | 2,124 |
| 14 | Palestino | 2,007 |
| 15 | Audax Italiano | 1,890 |
| 16 | Cobresal | 817 |

== See also ==
- 2024 Primera B de Chile
- 2024 Copa Chile
- 2024 Supercopa de Chile
