= Antonio de la Calancha =

Bolivian anthropologist

- Born: 1584; Sucre, Bolivia
- Died: March 1, 1654 (aged 69–70); Lima, Peru
- Scientific career
- Fields: Ethnography

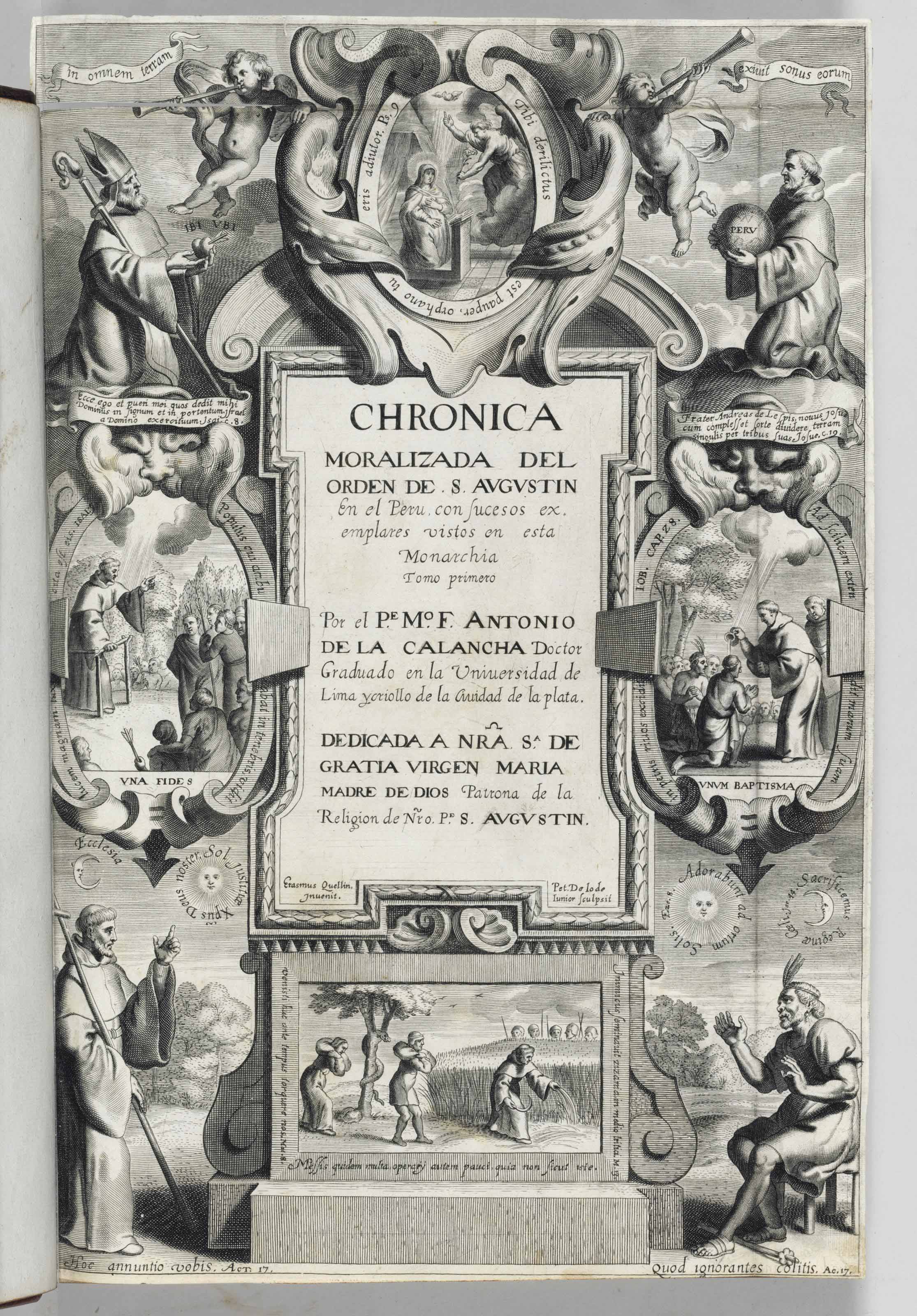
Antonio de la Calancha. "Cronica moralizada del Orden de San Agustin en el Peru", 1638

Antonio de la Calancha (1584–1654) was a pioneering anthropologist studying the South American natives and a senior Augustinian friar.

Calancha was the son of an Andalusian holder of an encomienda, Captain Francisco de la Calancha, and Doña Maria de Benavides. Although he himself declares in his chronicle that his parents were Andalusian, it is known for sure that his mother, Doña María de Benavides, was a "Criolla". His father, Francisco de la Calancha, had the rank of Captain and received the commission of Ambana in Larecaja, whose succession, which corresponded to him, Antonio resigned.

At fourteen he took the Augustinian habit in the convent of his native city. He then went to the school of his Order called San Ildefonso, in Lima, and graduated in theology at the University of San Marcos, also in the capital of Lima. He renounced the encomienda and took vows as an Augustinian friar in the city of Chuquisaca (also called Ciudad de la Plata de la Nueva Toledo and later Sucre). He moved to study in Lima, where he received Doctor degree of Theology at the University of San Marcos and became one of the most famous preachers of his time.

He reached high positions in his order, which led him to travel throughout the viceroyalty of Peru: he lived in Potosí (1610-1614), he held a chair in the convent of his order in Cusco; in Trujillo he was prior and witness of the earthquake of 1619, which destroyed the city.

In those places he gathered a great number of news for his Coronica moralizada de la orden de San Agustín en Perú, published in Barcelona in 1631, translated shortly after to Latin and French and reissued in Lima in 1653. Calancha continued gathering data with a view to write another volume, but his work was left unfinished. His disciple, Father Bernardo de Torres, reviewed the second part that Calancha left unfinished, completed it and published it in 1655 under the title of Chronicle of the Shrines of Our Lady of Copacabana and Prado. This work contains a lot of data on religion, customs, mores the Indians of Peru and Bolivia, about geography, theology, and is one of the most important works concerning the origin of the Indians and their history.

He read the unpublished manuscripts of the chroniclers Polo de Ondegardo, Miguel Cabello de Balboa, Fernando Avendaño, and Pablo José Arriaga and he collected folk beliefs and customs.

Calancha posited the similarity of Indians and Mongoloid (Tatars), but the migration of Asians he deduced through the lens of biblical information, such extravagant and naive as well as Montesinos. Like other authors, the beginning of the history of the Indians he traces to the era of ayllu and barbarism, when there were no class differences. His chronicle includes many tales and legends, he carefully studied the gods and religious traditions, languages, messages about idols. The information is unsystematic and often intertwined with Catholic religious teachings.

Calancha died in Lima in the morning of March 1, 1654.
