= The Extirpation of Idolatry in Peru =

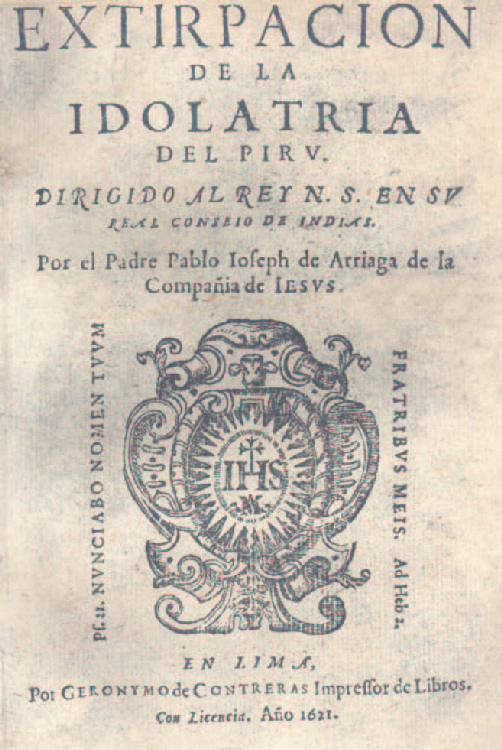
- Extirpación de la idolatría del Pirú (Lima, 1621), title page
- Author: Pablo José de Arriaga
- Language: Spanish
- Published: 1621 (Gerónimo de Contreras) (Spanish)
- Publication place: Peru

Extirpación de la idolatría del Pirú (in English translation: The Extirpation of Idolatry in Peru) by the Spanish Jesuit missionary Pablo José de Arriaga (1564, Vergara/Bergara - 1622, at sea) is a classical account of the early Spanish efforts to convert the indigenous peoples of Peru.

== History ==
The book was published in 1621 by Gerónimo de Contreras in Lima. The work, designed as a manual for the rooting out of paganism, was later included in the series Colección de libros y documentos referentes a la historia del Perú (CLDRHP, “Collection of Books and Documents Concerning the History of Peru”).

Christian missionaries tried to convert the local indigenous peoples to Christianity. They journeyed to remote native villages and recorded what they found there. They reported on the deities, rituals, customs, sacrifices, and the worldviews and value systems of the natives. The author was one of the earliest missionaries in that region, and describes these phenomena as an eyewitness and reports on the enormous difficulties faced by the Christian mission.

== Editions ==
- La extirpación de la idolatría en el Pirú (1621). Centro de Estudios Regionales Andinos “Bartolomé de Las Casas”, Cusco, 1999.

Translations:

- (English) The Extirpation of Idolatry in Peru. University of Kentucky Press, Lexington, 1968.
- (German) Eure Götter werden getötet: Ausrottung des Götzendienstes in Peru (1621). Wissenschaftliche Buchgesellschaft, Darmstadt 1992.
