= Miguel Ponce =

Chilean footballer and manager

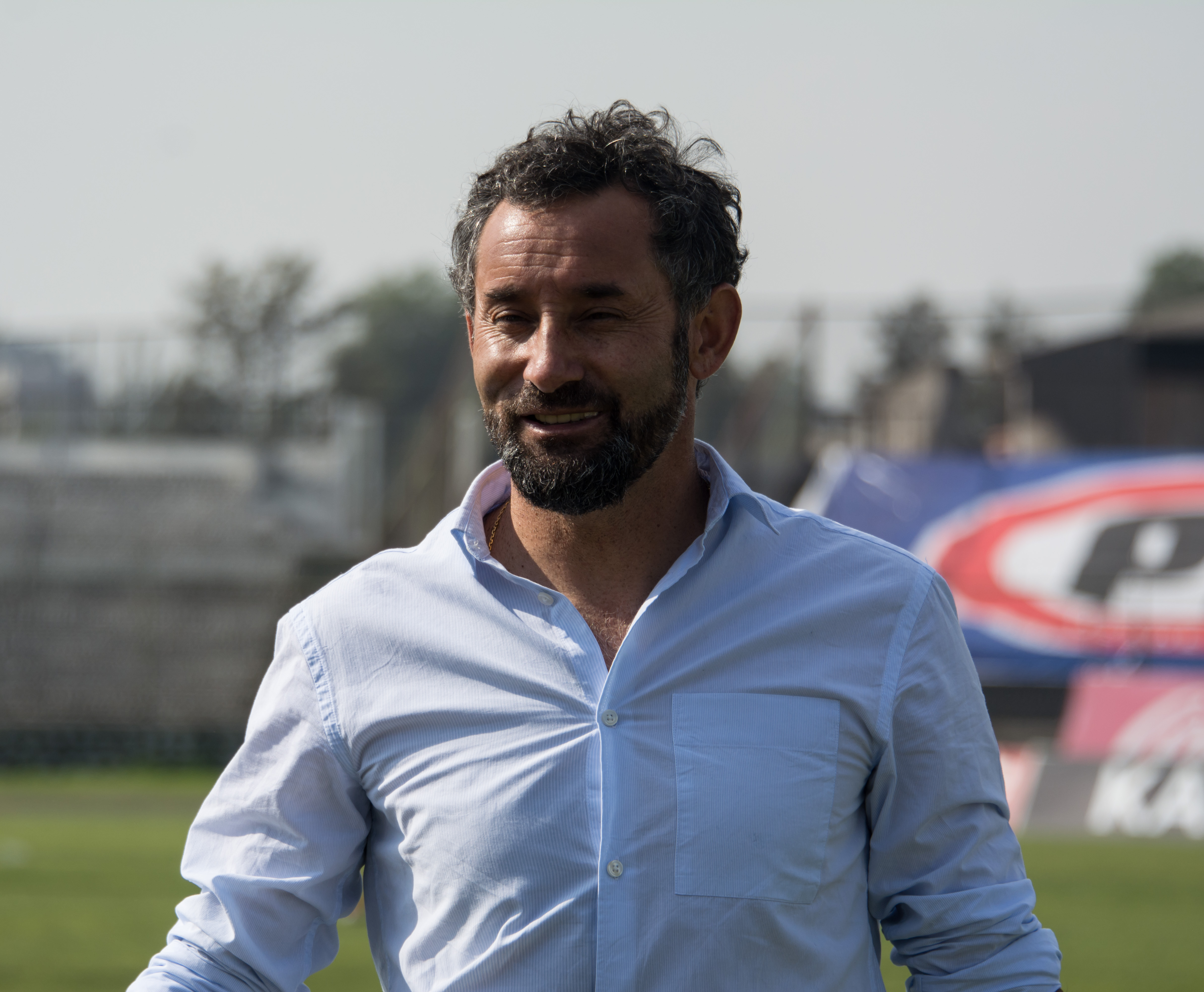
- Ponce as manager of Deportes Temuco in 2018

Personal information
- Full name: Miguel Andrés Ponce Torres
- Date of birth: 19 August 1971 (age 55)
- Place of birth: Santiago, Chile
- Height: 1.75 m (5 ft 9 in)
- Position: Defender

Team information
- Current team: Magallanes (manager)

Senior career*
Years	Team	Apps	(Gls)
1989–1994	Universidad Católica	28	(1)
1993	→ Deportes Temuco (loan)	9	(0)
1994	→ Everton (loan)	20	(1)
1995–1998	Universidad de Chile		
1999–2006	Universidad Católica		

International career
1991–2001	Chile	18	(0)

Managerial career
- 2011–2012: Deportes La Serena
- 2013–2014: San Luis
- 2014–2015: Unión San Felipe
- 2015: Chile U17
- 2016–2017: Huachipato
- 2017–2018: Universidad de Chile (youth)
- 2018: Deportes Temuco
- 2019: San José
- 2020: Blooming
- 2020–2021: Deportes La Serena
- 2022: Jorge Wilstermann
- 2023: Deportes Iquique
- 2024: Unión Española
- 2025: Rangers
- 2025–: Magallanes
- * Club domestic league appearances and goals

Miguel Andrés Ponce Torres (born 19 August 1971) is a Chilean football manager and former player who played as a defender. He is the current manager of Magallanes.

== Coaching career ==
Ponce signed with Unión Española for the 2024 season after getting promotion with Deportes Iquique to the top division in 2023. He was released on 3 September of the same year. The next year, he switched to Rangers de Talca.

== Honours ==
=== Player ===
Universidad Católica

- Primera División de Chile: 2005 Clausura
