= List of banks in Palestine =

The following is a list of banks in Palestine:

== Central bank ==
- Palestine Monetary Authority

== Major banks ==
1. Bank of Palestine
2. Arab Islamic Bank
3. Palestine Islamic Bank
4. Palestine Investment Bank
5. Al Quds Bank
6. The National Bank TNB
7. Safa Bank
8. Arab Bank (Palestine)
9. Cairo Amman Bank
10. Bank of Jordan
11. Housing Bank
12. Egyptian Arab Land Bank
13. Jordan Ahli Bank
14. Commercial Bank of Jordan
15. Jordan Kuwait Bank
16. The National Christian Bank
