= Arab Bank Palestine =

Bank of Palestine

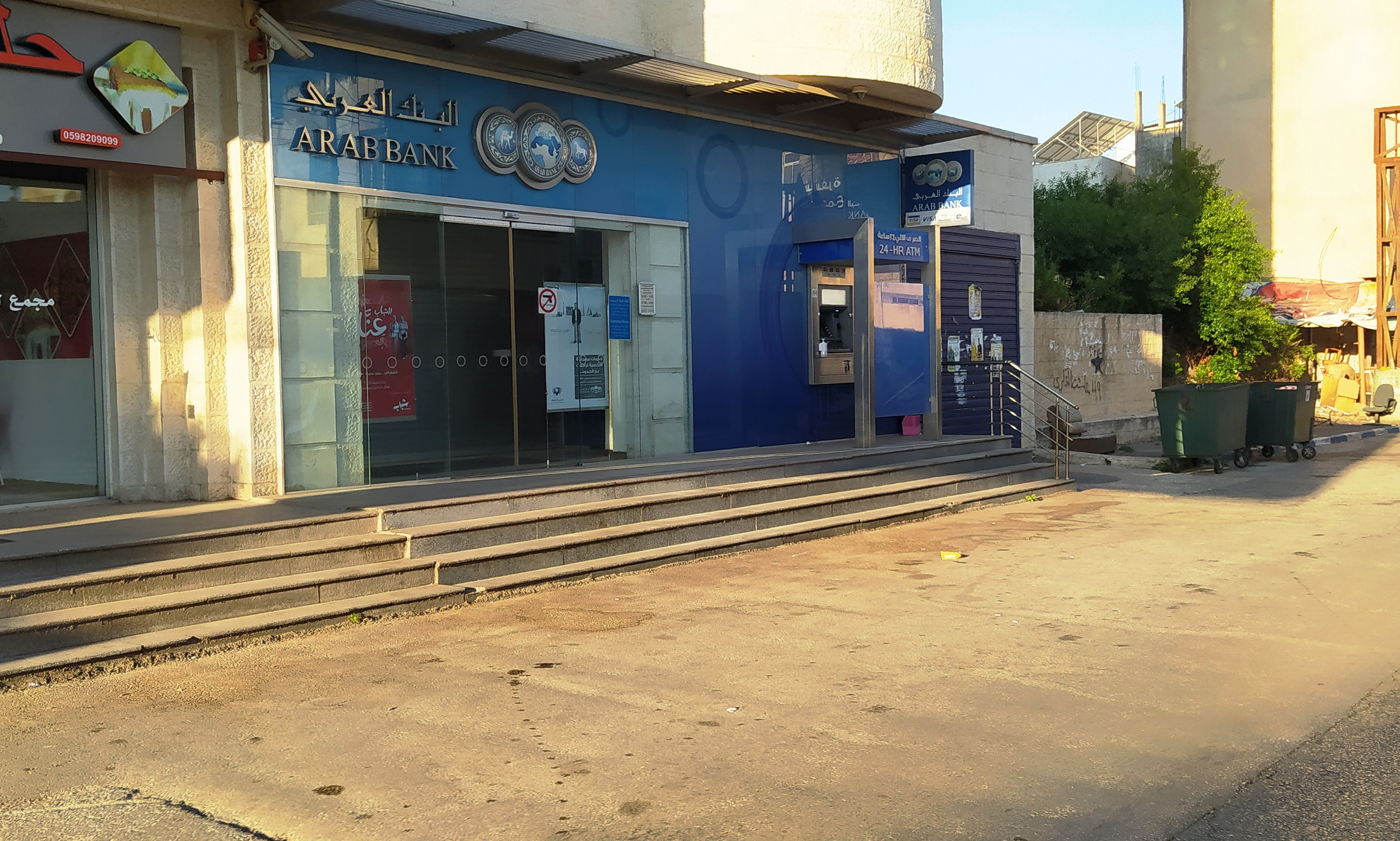
- Branch in Salfit
- Native name: البنك العربي
- Type: Subsidiary
- Industry: Financial services
- Founded: 1930; 96 years ago
- Headquarters: Ramallah, Palestine
- Number of locations: 33 (2025)
- Area served: Palestine
- Key people: Jamal Hurani (Country Manager)
- Products: Banking services
- Number of employees: 903 (2025)
- Parent: Arab Bank
- Website: www.arabbank.ps

The Arab Bank Palestine, (arabic: البنك العربي فلسطين) is a major Palestian bank which is a subsidiary of the Jordanian Arab Bank.

As of 2025, the bank represents 20% of Market share.

== History ==
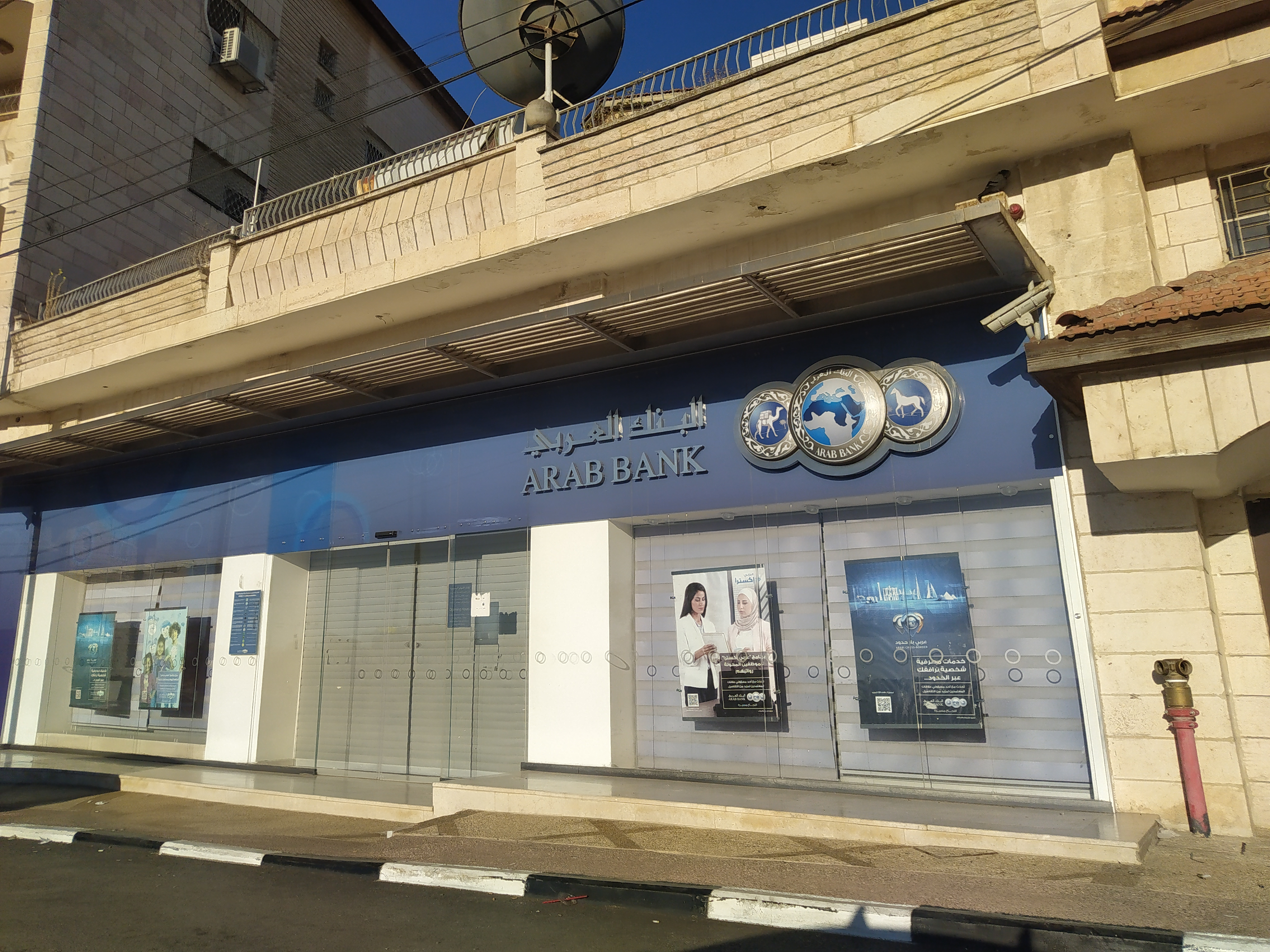
Agency in Birzeit.

Arab Bank was founded in 1930 in Jerusalem, Mandatory Palestine, as the first private sector financial institution in the Arab world.

After the British Mandate Authority withdrew from Palestine in 1948, the Bank lost its branches in Jaffa and Haifa. When customers who were obliged to leave the country asked for their deposits, Arab Bank fully redeemed all claims. This decision won the Arab Bank a great reputation and became a historical turning point in its growth. The lost branches were re-established: Haifa branch was relocated to Beirut followed by Amman, Jaffa branch in Nablus and later Ramallah. When the branch in Jerusalem was caught up in the civil disturbance, the Bank’s activities were moved to offices within the old city of Jerusalem.

In 1948, the Bank's headquarters were transferred to Amman, Jordan, where it was officially incorporated as a public shareholding company.

Following the relocation to Amman, Arab Bank continued to operate in the West Bank (then under Jordanian administration) and the Gaza Strip (then under Egyptian administration). After the 1967 War and the subsequent Israeli occupation of these territories, the bank's branches were closed by the Israeli military authorities.

For nearly three decades, Arab Bank maintained a "dormant" presence in Palestine until the Oslo Accords. In 1994, it became one of the first major financial institutions to re-establish a physical presence in the West Bank and Gaza under the newly formed Palestinian Authority.

On 25 February 2004, Israeli police, Internal Security Agency (Shabak) officers and Border Police raided branches of Arab Bank and the Cairo Amman Bank in Ramallah, seizing in cash from the bank vaults more than 35 million shekels (equivalent of US$ 7 million).

In 2023, with the start of the Gaza war, the bank's branch operations in the Gaza strip were closed. In October 2025, the gradual resumption of the bank's operations was announced.

== See also ==
- List of banks in Palestine
