= Gustavo Álvarez =

Argentine footballer and manager

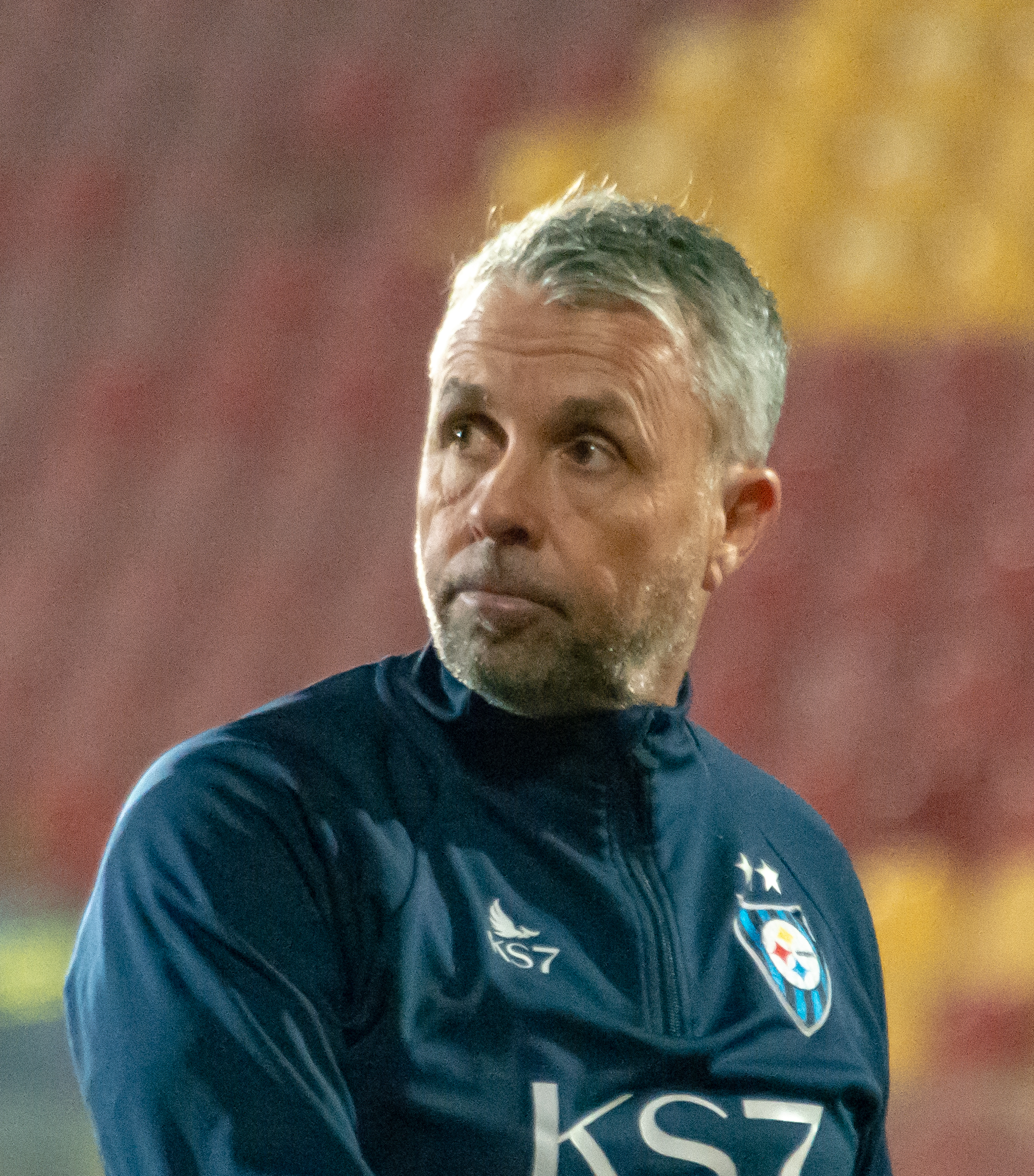
- Álvarez with Huachipato in 2023

Personal information
- Full name: Gustavo Álvarez
- Date of birth: 27 October 1972 (age 54)
- Place of birth: Haedo, Argentina
- Height: 1.69 m (5 ft 7 in)
- Position: Left-back

Team information
- Current team: LDU Quito (head coach)

Youth career
- Racing Club
- Lanús

Senior career*
Years	Team	Apps	(Gls)
1992–1993	Arsenal de Sarandí		
1993–1996	Temperley		
1996–1997	Barracas Central	19	(0)
1997–1998	Centro Español	1	(0)

Managerial career
- 2015–2016: Temperley (reserves)
- 2016: Temperley (interim)
- 2016–2017: Temperley
- 2017–2019: Aldosivi
- 2019–2020: Patronato
- 2021: Sport Boys
- 2022: Atlético Grau
- 2023: Huachipato
- 2024–2025: Universidad de Chile
- 2026: San Lorenzo
- 2026–: LDU Quito
- * Club domestic league appearances and goals

Gustavo Álvarez (born 27 October 1972) is an Argentine football manager and former player who played as a left back. He is the manager of LDU Quito.

== Playing career ==
After representing Racing Club and Lanús, Álvarez made his senior debut with Arsenal de Sarandí in 1992, in the Primera B Nacional. He moved to Temperley in the following year, and helped in their promotion to the second division in 1995.

In 1996, Álvarez joined Barracas Central. He signed for Centro Español in the following year, but featured in just one match before retiring.

== Managerial career ==
After retiring, Álvarez worked as a youth coordinator at his former club Temperley, before becoming a manager of their reserve team in September 2015. On 4 May 2016, he was named interim manager of the side for the remainder of the season, replacing Iván Delfino.

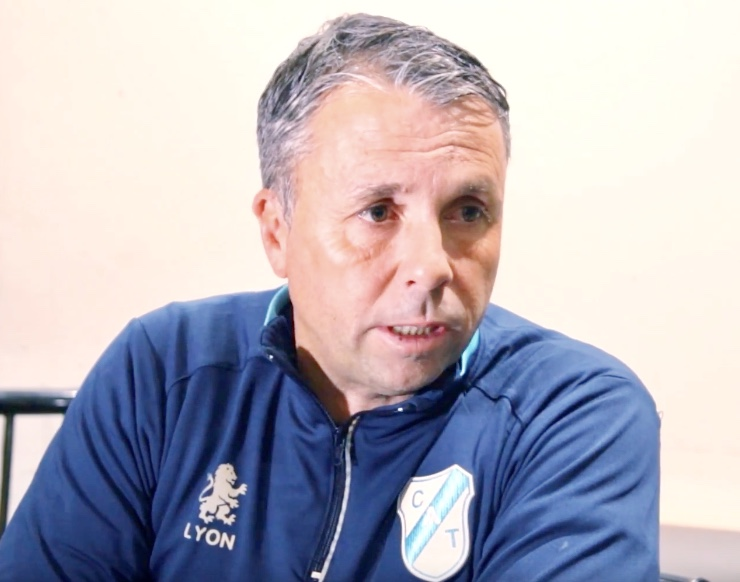
Álvarez as manager of Temperley in 2017

Back to the reserves after the appointment of Carlos Mayor, Álvarez again became an interim of the side on 8 November 2016, after Mayor was sacked. Despite only one draw in four matches in charge, he was permanently named manager of the club on 28 December, but resigned on 5 November 2017.

On 21 November 2017, Álvarez was named manager of Aldosivi in the second division. He led the club to a top tier promotion in his first season, but resigned on 28 September 2019.

On 30 November 2019, Álvarez was appointed in charge of Patronato also in the top tier, but was sacked on 15 December of the following year. On 12 May 2021, he moved abroad for the first time in his career, taking over Peruvian side Sport Boys.

After leaving the Boys by mutual consent on 1 September 2021, Álvarez took over fellow league team Atlético Grau on 9 November. After resigning from the latter on 11 November 2022, he moved to Chile and was named Huachipato manager four days later.

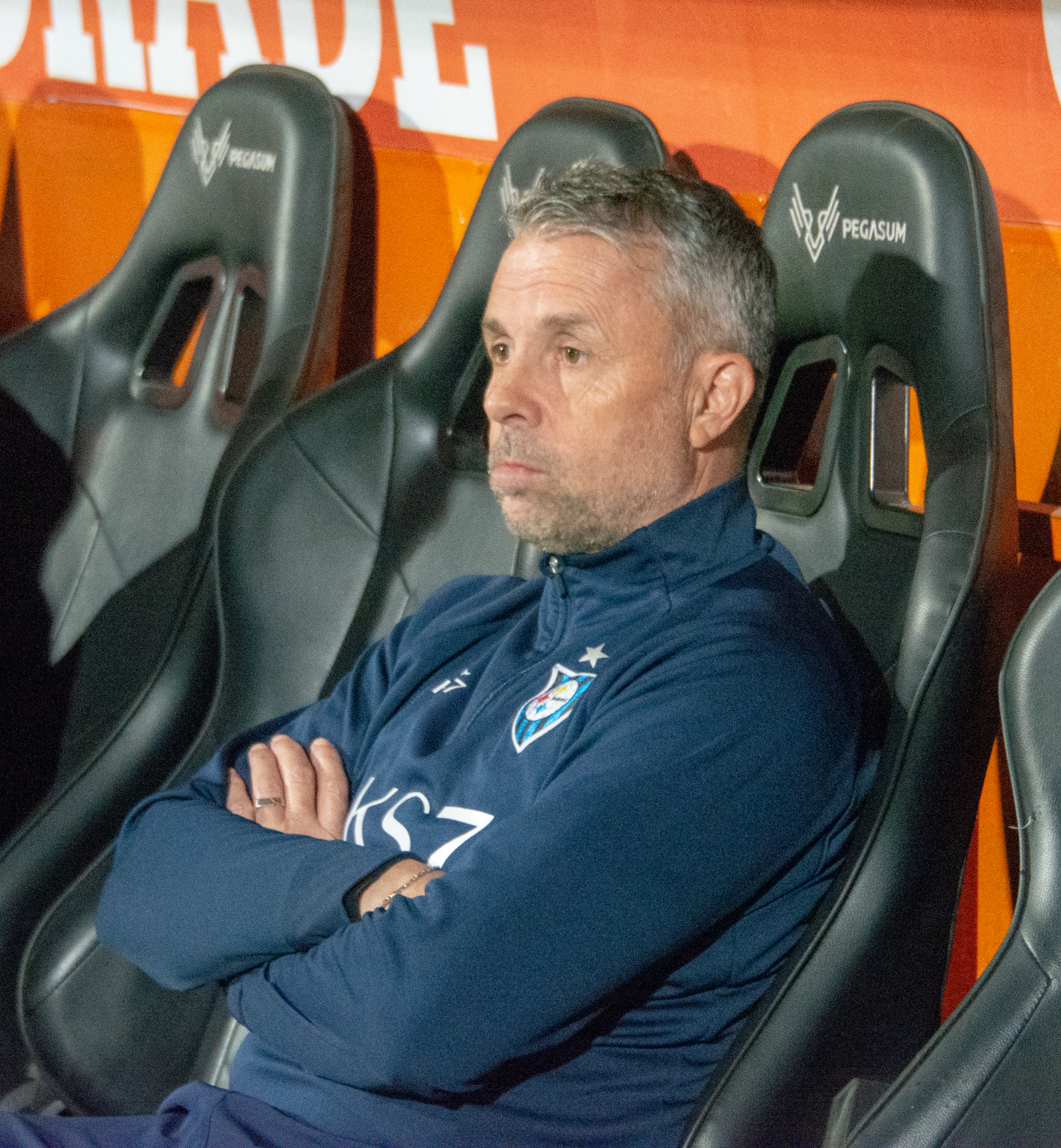
Álvarez managing Huachipato in 2023

On 23 December 2023, Álvarez left Huachipato to take over Universidad de Chile. Exactly two years later, he left the club by mutual consent.

On 22 March 2026, Álvarez returned to his home country after being appointed at the helm of San Lorenzo. Exactly three months later, he resigned.

== Managerial statistics ==
As of match played 17 October 2026

Managerial record by team and tenure
Team	Nat	From	To	Record							
Team	Nat	From	To	G	W	D	L	GF	GA	GD	Win %
Temperley (interim)	(Argentina)	4 May 2016	16 June 2016	4	1	0	3	3	6	−3	25.00
Temperley	(Argentina)	8 November 2016	5 November 2017	31	10	6	15	32	46	−14	32.26
Aldosivi	(Argentina)	21 November 2017	28 September 2019	55	20	14	21	53	55	−2	36.36
Patronato	(Argentina)	2 December 2019	16 December 2020	17	2	7	8	14	27	−13	11.76
Sport Boys	(Peru)	12 May 2021	1 September 2021	11	5	4	2	13	10	+3	45.45
Atlético Grau	(Peru)	9 November 2021	11 November 2022	36	15	10	11	50	42	+8	41.67
Huachipato	(Chile)	1 January 2023	31 December 2023	32	18	7	7	54	34	+20	56.25
Universidad de Chile	(Chile)	1 January 2024	23 December 2025	93	53	20	20	174	82	+92	56.99
San Lorenzo	(Argentina)	22 March 2026	22 June 2026	13	3	8	2	12	10	+2	23.08
LDU Quito	(Ecuador)	24 July 2026	present	17	9	5	3	26	14	+12	52.94
Total				309	136	81	92	431	329	+102	44.01

== Honours ==
=== Player ===
Temperley

- Primera C Metropolitana: 1994–95

=== Manager ===
Aldosivi

- Primera B Nacional: 2017–18

Huachipato

- Chilean Primera División: 2023

Universidad de Chile

- Copa Chile: 2024
- Supercopa de Chile: 2025

Individual

- Chilean Primera División Best Manager: 2024
