= Pablo José Arriaga =

Spanish Jesuit missionary (1564-1622)

Pablo José Arriaga, SJ (Arriga; Vergara, Biscay, 1564 – died at sea, 1622) was a Spanish Jesuit missionary in colonial Peru.

== Life ==
He entered the Society of Jesus in 1579, and in 1585 went to Peru, where he was ordained. In 1588 he was appointed rector of the College of San Martin at Lima, which post he filled thrice in the course of twenty-four years.

He visited Europe in 1601, sent to Rome by his superiors. Returning in 1604, he became Rector of the College of Arequipa, (1612–15).

It was during the period from 1604 to 1622 that Father Arriaga became identified with the task of uprooting the survivals of indigenous religion in Peru. He accompanied one of the earliest official visitors, Father Fernando de Avendano. He also directed the construction of a college for sons of indigenous rulers, caciques, and of a house of correction for indigenous shamans.

In 1620 he completed his Extirpacion de l'Idolatría en el Perú (Lima, 1621), translated to English as The Extirpation of Idolatry. The year following he was again sent to Europe on a confidential mission. Embarking at Portobelo, the fleet to which his vessel belonged was struck by a storm. His ship and four others were beached and wrecked.

He also wrote an ecclesiastic rhetoric: Rhetoris Christiani partes septem: exemplis cum sacris tum philosophicis illustratae. Nunc primum in lucem prodeunt. Lyon, Sumptibus Horatij Cardon, 1619, [24], 391 p.; reedited in Amberes, 1659.
