= Boris Aravena =

Chilean footballer (born 1982)

Personal information
- Full name: Boris Mauricio Aravena Chamorro
- Date of birth: 31 July 1982 (age 44)
- Place of birth: Talca, Chile
- Height: 1.70 m (5 ft 7 in)
- Positions: Centre back; right back

Senior career*
Years	Team	Apps	(Gls)
2002–2007	Curicó Unido	150	(1)
2008–2009	Unión San Felipe	72	(8)
2010	Unión La Calera	34	(2)
2011	Cobresal	31	(1)
2013	Deportes Concepción	9	(0)
2013–2014	San Luis	33	(2)
2014–2015	Coquimbo Unido	26	(0)
Total		355	(14)
- * Club domestic league appearances and goals

Boris Mauricio Aravena Chamorro (born 31 July 1982) is a Chilean former footballer who played as a defender. His last club was then Primera B side Coquimbo Unido.

== Honours ==
=== Club ===
Curicó Unido

- Tercera División de Chile (1): 2005

Unión San Felipe

- Primera B (1): 2009
- Copa Chile (1): 2009
