= Bank of Palestine =

Banking corporation in the State of Palestine

Bank of Palestine بنك فلسطين
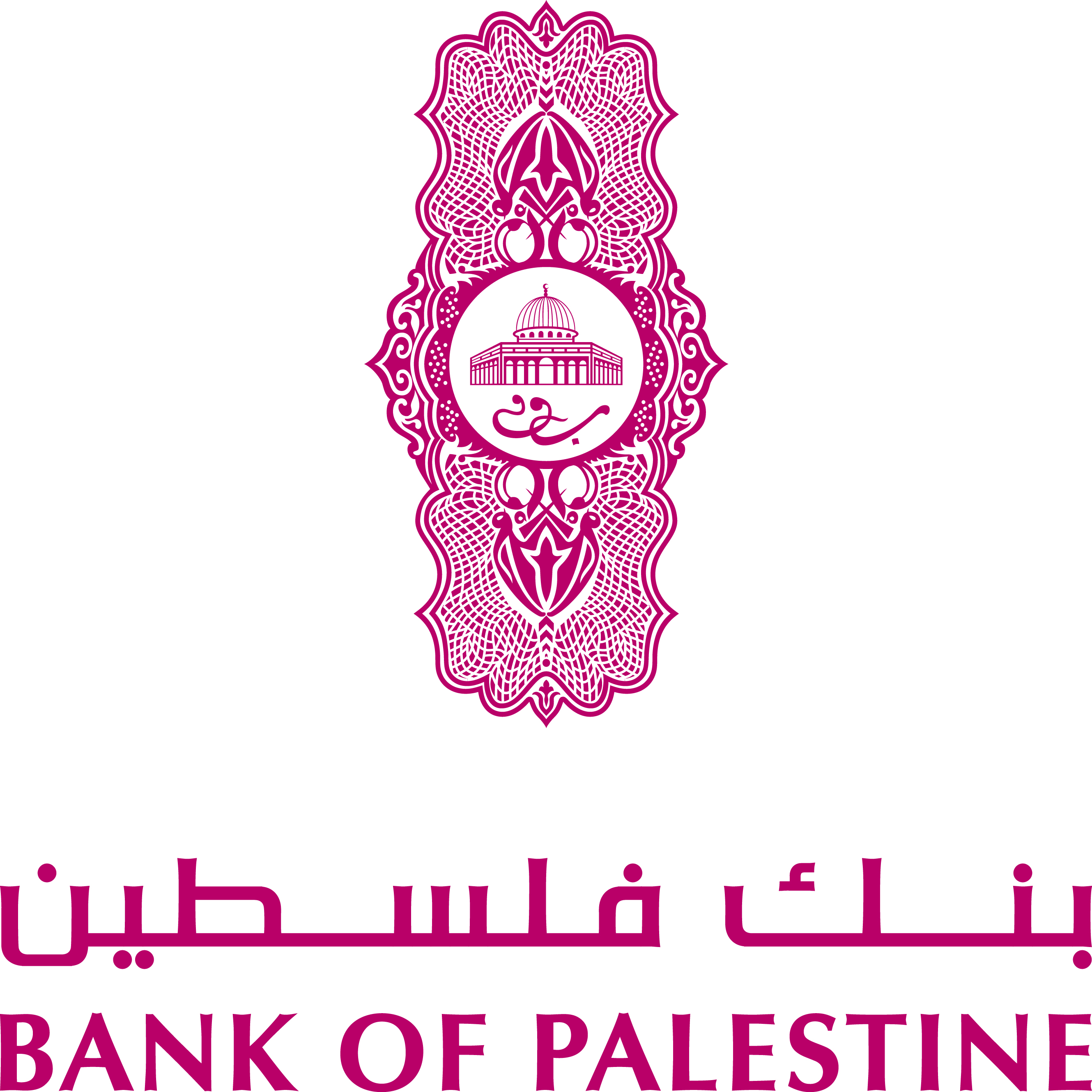
- Logo of the Bank of Palestine
- Headquarters: Ramallah, Ain Misbah, Palestine
- Established: 1960
- Chairman: Hashim Shawa
- Website: https://bop.ps

The Bank of Palestine (BoP; Arabic: بنك فلسطين), is a Palestinian multinational banking organization founded in Gaza in 1960. It is headquartered in Ramallah, West Bank and is the leading financial institution in Palestine, with a net worth of $6.5 billion USD.

== History ==
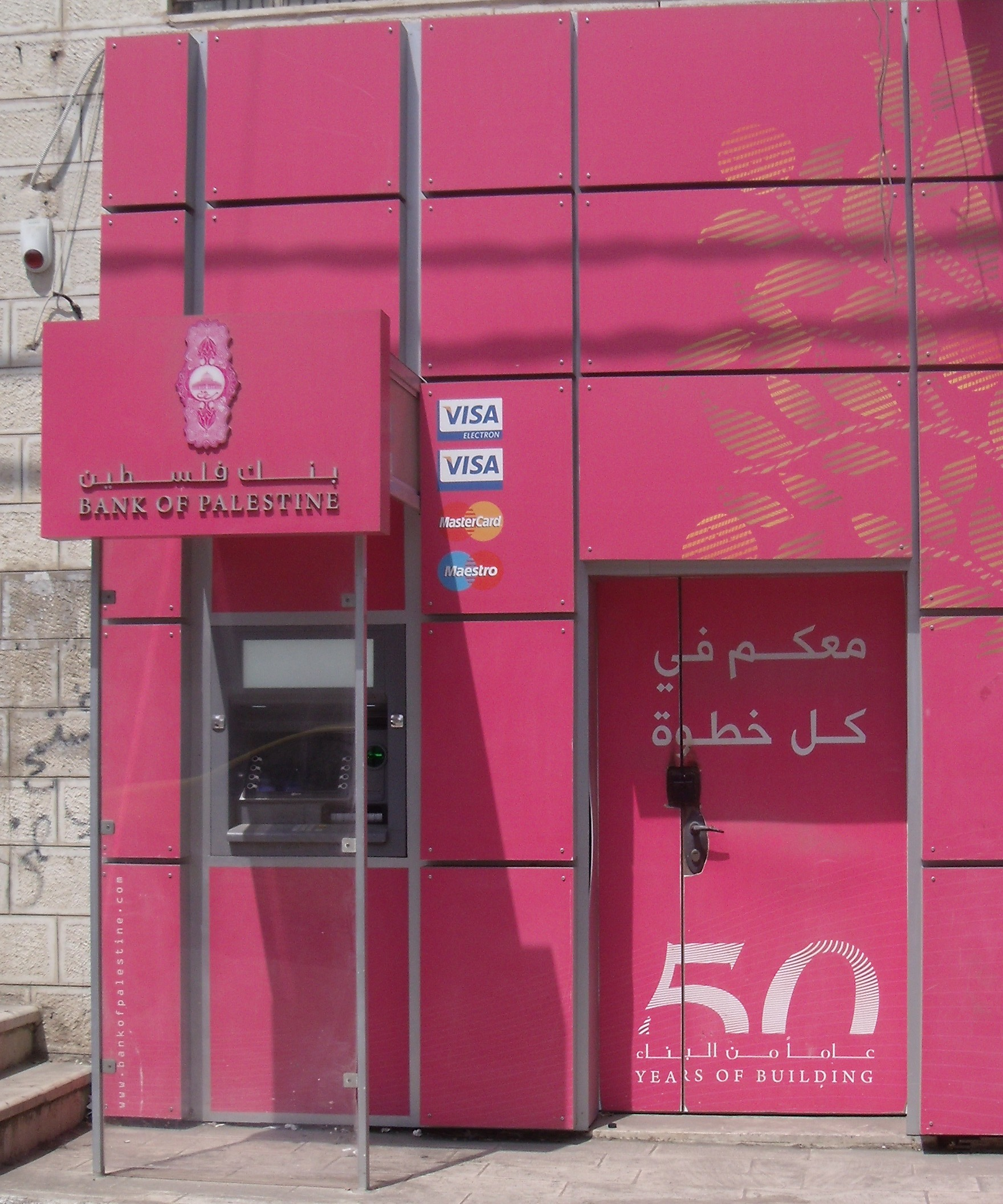
Bank of Palestine automated teller machine in Ramallah

The bank was established in Gaza City in 1960, making it the first in Palestine. Haj Hashim Atta Shawa founded it as an agricultural bank to help farmers develop their citrus business since Shawa's family was also in the citrus business at the time. The bank helped farmers with loans for farming equipment.

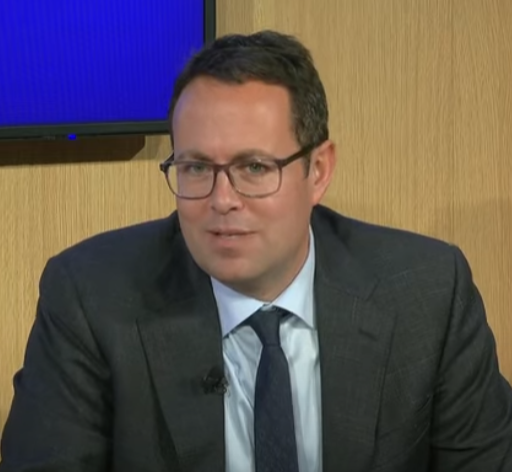
Hashim Shawa, CEO of the bank since 2007

In the early 1990s, Hani Shawa took over in running the bank. Hashim Shawa, aged 31, became chairman and CEO of the bank after his father died in 2007. Since then, the bank has about 1,980 employees and serves over 900,000 customers.

In 2019, the bank was the target of an amended complaint titled Singer v. Bank of Palestine (case number: 1:19-cv-00006) which claimed that the bank aided the Palestinian militant group Hamas by providing financial services and maintaining accounts for the organization. The Bank of Palestine claimed that there was no legal basis behind the plaintiffs' claims and that they were taking "prompt and strong measures" to get the lawsuit dismissed.

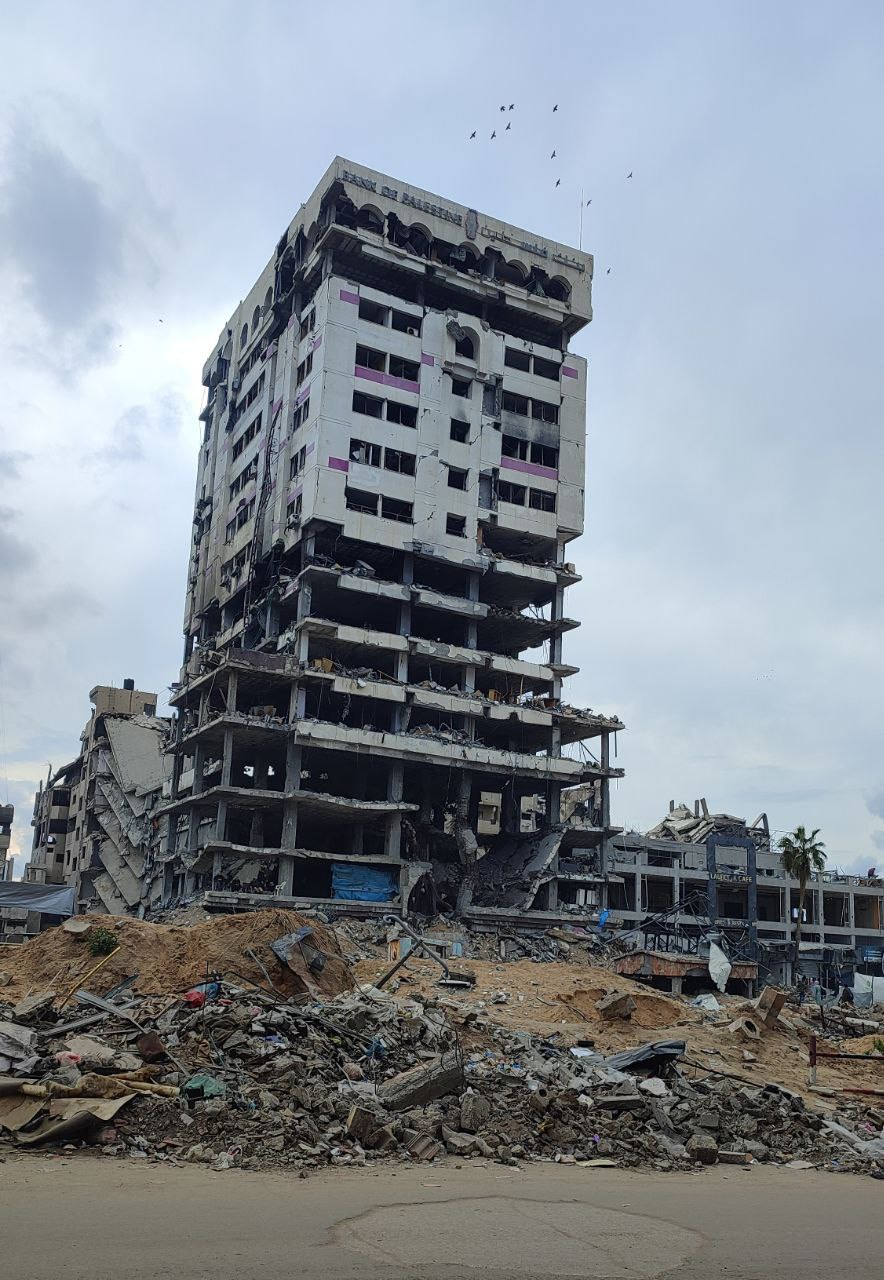
Gaza head office, destroyed by Israeli bombing, September 2024

According to a report in the French newspaper Le Monde, the bank informed its partners about a series of robberies by armed gangs in Gaza with alleged ties to Hamas, that occurred over a series of several days that resulted in the loss of €66 million euros or 70 million dollars, during the Gaza war in 2024.

The theft of €2.8 million in Israeli shekels was discovered on 16 April, after perpetrators had broken into a vault. The staff tried to secure remaining cash reserves by pouring concrete over the cash boxes, but the concrete block was opened the next day with the help of explosives, and the attackers stole the equivalent of €29 million in various currencies. On 18 April gunmen got away with the equivalent of €33.6 million from the second largest branch of the bank in Gaza, by identifying themselves as representatives of the authorities and forcing their way into the building.

== Locations ==
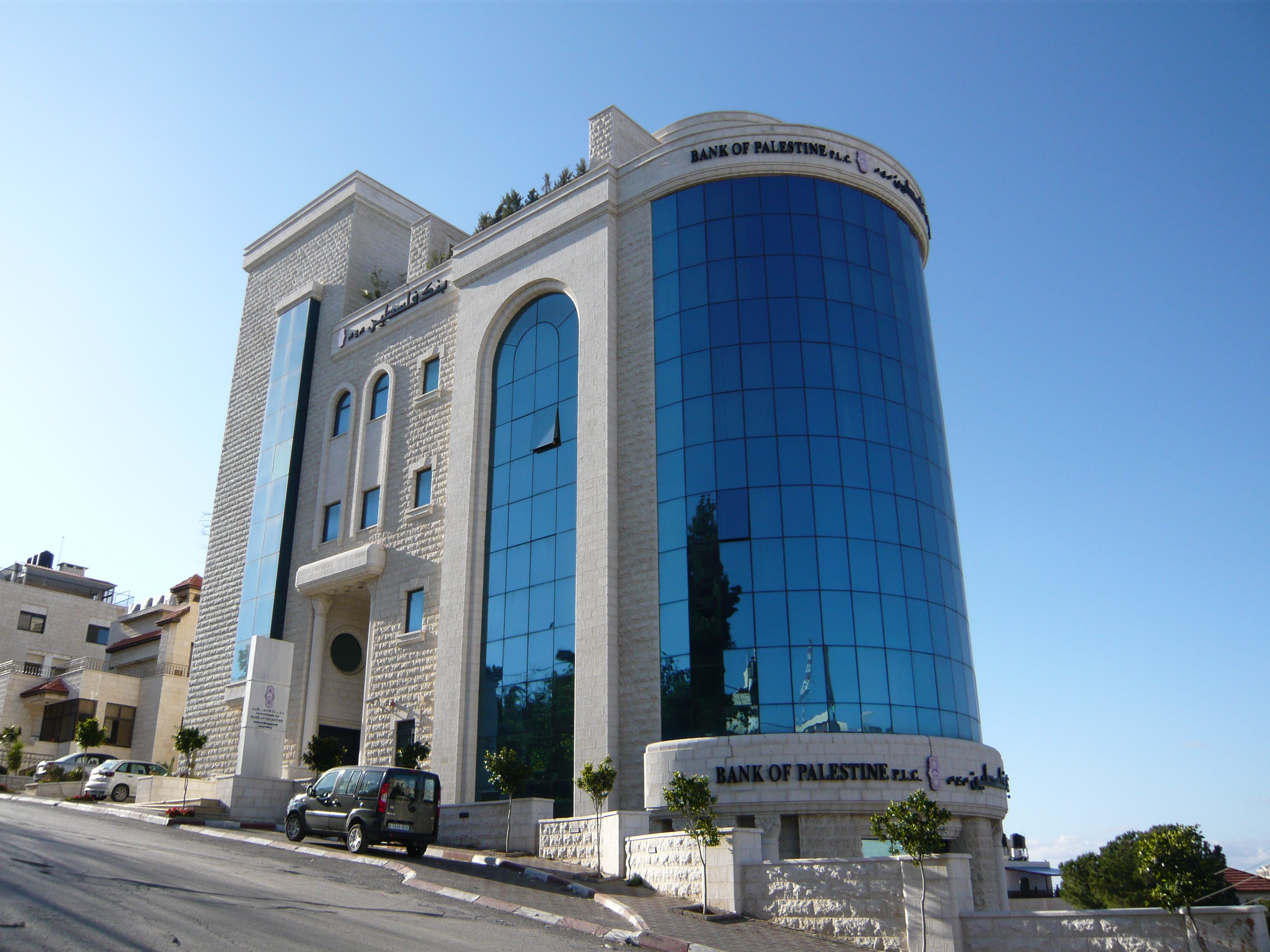
Head office in Ramallah, 2010

The Bank of Palestine is the most geographically distributed banking corporation in Palestine, with 74 branches and sub-branches. The bank's head office is located in Ramallah, Palestine. It also has representative offices in Dubai, United Arab Emirates, and Santiago, Chile.

== Philanthropy ==
In 2016, Bank of Palestine launched "NAHJ Project" to support school entrepreneurship in Jerusalem schools.

== See also ==
- List of banks in Palestine
