= Felipe Salinas =

Chilean manager (born 1982)

Personal information
- Full name: Felipe Alejandro Salinas Gatica
- Date of birth: 12 May 1982 (age 44)
- Place of birth: Quillota, Chile
- Height: 1.78 m (5 ft 10 in)
- Position: Defender

Youth career
- 1987–1999: San Luis

Senior career*
Years	Team	Apps	(Gls)
1999–2007	San Luis	45	(1)
1999	→ Manuela Figueroa (loan)	–	(–)
2002	→ San Antonio Unido (loan)	–	(–)
2008–2010	Cobreloa	83	(3)
2010–2012	Unión San Felipe	49	(2)
2013–2014	Cobresal	45	(2)
2014–2015	San Luis	31	(0)
2015–2016	Everton	27	(3)
2016–2018	Unión La Calera	42	(1)
Total		322	(12)

Managerial career
- 2019–2021: San Luis (youth)
- 2020–2021: San Luis (assistant)
- 2022: Trasandino (assistant)
- 2023: San Marcos (assistant)
- 2023: Audax Italiano (assistant)
- 2024: Audax Italiano (assistant)
- 2025–: Santiago Wanderers (youth)
- 2026–: Santiago Wanderers (assistant)
- * Club domestic league appearances and goals

Felipe Alejandro Salinas Gatica (born 12 May 1982) is a Chilean football coach and former player who coaches Santiago Wanderers.

He played as a defender for Cobreloa, Unión San Felipe and San Luis de Quillota. Salinas obtained his professional degree at the Pontifical Catholic University of Valparaíso (PUCV) while playing for San Luis.

== Playing career ==
A product of San Luis de Quillota, he was loaned to Manuela Figueroa F.C. in the Chilean fourth level in 1999 before joining the first team of San Luis in 2000. In 2002, he again was loaned, now to San Antonio Unido.

In the second half of 2008, Salinas was transferred to Cobreloa for play the Torneo Clausura, then managed by Marco Antonio Figueroa. During that campaign, the team reached the playoffs semifinals against Chilean powerhouse Colo-Colo. He remained at the club until the 2010 season.

After spells with Unión San Felipe and Cobresal, Salinas returned to San Luis, where he contributed to the club's promotion by winning the 2014–15 Primera B title. Despite this, he signed for Everton for the 2015–16 Primera B season, which was split into the Apertura (first half of 2015) and Clausura (second half of 2016) tournaments. He stayed with the club until the end of 2016.

At the beginning of 2017, he ended his contract with Everton and joined Unión La Calera, which was also competing in Primera B at the time. There, he helped the team win the Torneo Transición, a competition introduced to transition away from European-style calendar used in Chilean football since August 2013.

Salinas remained with Unión La Calera until 2018, when he retired from professional football.

== Coaching career ==
Following his retirement, Salinas has developed a coaching career at the youth ranks of San Luis de Quillota and later as assistant coach of clubs such as San Marcos de Arica and Audax Italiano.

In 2026, he led the Santiago Wanderers under-20 team at the U-20 Copa Libertadores.

== Personal life ==
During his playing career Salinas studied at university and graduated in geography.

== Honours ==
=== Player ===
San Luis de Quillota

- Tercera División de Chile: 2003
- Primera B: 2014–15

Unión La Calera

- Primera B: 2017

=== Manager ===
Santiago Wanderers

- U-20 Copa Libertadores: 2026
