= Phillip Araos =

Chilean footballer (born 1990)

Personal information
- Full name: Phillip Michael Thomas Araos Maita
- Date of birth: June 10, 1990 (age 36)
- Place of birth: Antofagasta, Chile
- Height: 1.70 m (5 ft 7 in)
- Position: Forward

Youth career
- Colo-Colo

Senior career*
Years	Team	Apps	(Gls)
2009–2013	Colo-Colo	12	(3)
2010	→ Everton (loan)	7	(0)
2011	→ Coquimbo Unido (loan)	3	(0)
2012	Colo-Colo B	13	(8)
2013	→ Deportes Puerto Montt (loan)	14	(4)
2013	Glyfadas	1	(0)
2014–2015	Colchagua	–	(–)
2015	→ Real San Joaquín (loan)	–	(–)
2016	Buenos Aires	–	(–)
- * Club domestic league appearances and goals as of 19:23, 20 February 2010 (UTC)

Phillip Michael Thomas Araos Maita (born June 30, 1990) is a Chilean footballer.

He played for Deportes Colchagua.

He was named after Miami Vice actor Philip Michael Thomas.

== Honours ==
=== Club ===
Colo-Colo

- Primera División de Chile (1): 2009 Clausura

Colchagua

- Tercera A (1): 2014
