= Jorge Schwager =

Chilean footballer (born 1983)

Personal information
- Full name: Jorge Osvaldo Schwager Navarrete
- Date of birth: 4 July 1983 (age 43)
- Place of birth: Osorno, Chile
- Height: 1.72 m (5 ft 8 in)
- Positions: Left-back; midfielder

Senior career*
Years	Team	Apps	(Gls)
2005	Provincial Osorno	?	(?)
2006–2008	Deportes Puerto Montt	?	(?)
2009	Deportes La Serena	27	(2)
2010–2012	Universidad de Concepción	53	(1)
2013–2014	Unión La Calera	34	(0)
2014–2015	Palestino	14	(0)

Managerial career
- 2015: Palestino (assistant)
- 2016–2018: Colo-Colo (assistant)
- 2018: Colo-Colo (youth)
- 2019: Universidad Concepción (assistant)
- 2020–2023: Deportes Recoleta (assistant)
- 2024–: Palestino (reserves)
- 2024: Palestino (interim)
- * Club domestic league appearances and goals

Jorge Osvaldo Schwager Navarrete (born 4 July 1983) is a Chilean football manager and former player who played as either a left-back or a midfielder.

== Coaching career ==
After retiring, Schwager began coaching, starting his new experience in July 2016, when he was appointed assistant coach of Pablo Guede at Colo-Colo. From 2018, Schwager also functioned as a youth coach at Colo.

In January 2019, Schwager was appointed assistant coach of Francisco Bozán at Universidad de Concepción They left the club at the end of 2019.

On 3 February 2020, Schwager signed as an assistant coach for Deportes Recoleta under the management of his former teammate, Felipe Núñez.
