= Cristóbal González =

Chilean footballer (born 1982)

Cristobal Gonzalez
Personal information
- Full name: Cristobal Alejandro González Urzua
- Date of birth: February 15, 1982 (age 44)
- Place of birth: Rancagua, Chile
- Height: 1.77 m (5 ft 10 in)
- Position: Defender

Team information
- Current team: Ñublense
- Number: 27

Senior career*
Years	Team	Apps	(Gls)
2003–2004	O'Higgins	8	(0)
2005–2006	Deportes Colchagua	?	(?)
2007–2009	O'Higgins	52	(5)
2010–2011	Deportes Concepción	53	(3)
2012	Ñublense	27	(0)
2013	Cobresal		
2013–present	Puerto Montt		
- * Club domestic league appearances and goals

Cristobal Alejandro González Urzua (Rancagua, Chile, February 15, 1982) is a Chilean footballer. Play as the wheel and defense in Ñublense of Primera División de Chile using the jersey No. 27.

== See also ==
- Football in Chile
- List of football clubs in Chile
