= Nazareth Avendaño Incera =

Costa Rican diplomat

Ambassador Nazareth Avendaño Incera (born in 1941) is a career officer of the Costa Rican foreign service. She is currently the Director of the Worship Department of the Ministry Foreign Affairs and Worship of Costa Rica.

From 2007 to 2009, she was the Consul General of Costa Rica in San Juan, Puerto Rico. Between 2005 and 2009, she was Deputy Director of the Protocol Department of Costa Rican Foreign Ministry. From 1999 to 2004, she was a member of the United Nations Advisory Committee on Administrative and Budgetary Questions (ACABQ). Between 1998 and 1999, she was vice-chairman of the Fifth Committee of the United Nations General Assembly, which deals with budgetary and administrative issues.

Between 1978 and 1999, she was posted to the Permanent Mission of Costa Rica to the United Nations in New York City, where she rose from Counsellor (1978–1983), to Minister Counsellor (1983–1989), and then to Ambassador and second alternate delegate (1989–1999). During that period, she was an alternate representative of Costa Rica to the United Nations Security Council, dealing mostly with European issues (1997–1998) and she represented Costa Rica in the Fifth, Fourth (Decolonization) and Second (Development) Committees of the United Nations General Assembly. In 1977, she headed the Costa Rican Delegation to Ministerial Meeting of the Movement of Non-Aligned Countries (NAM) held in New Delhi, while, in 1994, she headed the Costa Rican Delegation to the NAM Ministerial Meeting held in Indonesia.

Ambassador Avendaño Incera began her diplomatic service as Vice-consul of Costa Rica in Milan, Italy (1964–1967). She was also Consul in Milan (1967–1972) and in New York (1972–1978).

She studied at the Multinational Institute of American Studies on Contemporary American politics of New York University, the Università Cattolica del Sacro Cuore in Milan, and at the University of Southern Mississippi.
