= Manuel Ormazábal =

Chilean footballer (born 1983)

Personal information
- Full name: Manuel Alejandro Ormazábal Pino
- Date of birth: 10 March 1983 (age 43)
- Place of birth: Santiago, Chile
- Height: 1.78 m (5 ft 10 in)
- Position: Midfielder

Team information
- Current team: San Antonio Unido
- Number: 5

Youth career
- Universidad Católica

Senior career*
Years	Team	Apps	(Gls)
2003–2006	Universidad Católica	8	(0)
2005	→ U. de Conce (loan)	14	(0)
2007–2008	Provincial Osorno	68	(2)
2009	Unión San Felipe	39	(1)
2010	Deportes Concepción	26	(0)
2011	Rangers	36	(2)
2012	Coquimbo Unido	31	(0)
2013–2014	Deportes Concepción	27	(0)
2014–2015	Deportes Temuco	41	(0)
2015–2016	Rangers	23	(0)
2016–2017	Cobreloa	14	(0)
2017–	San Antonio Unido	6	(1)
- * Club domestic league appearances and goals as of 20 September 2017

Manuel Alejandro Ormazábal Pino (born 10 March 1983) is a Chilean footballer that currently plays for Chilean Second Division club San Antonio Unido as defender.

== Honours ==
=== Club ===
Provincial Osorno

- Primera B: 2007

Unión San Felipe

- Primera B: 2009
- Copa Chile: 2009

Rangers

- Primera B: 2011
