= Diego de Avendaño =

Peruvian Jesuit theologian and jurist

Diego de Avendaño (1594 in Segovia – 1688), was a Peruvian Jesuit, a theologian, jurist and moral philosopher. He was the author of the monumental Thesaurus Indicus, a study of the legal and moral issues typical of life in the Spanish-American colonies.

== Life ==
Diego de Avendaño was born in Segovia in 1594 and moved to Peru in 1610. Two years later, while a student of the college of Saint-Matin in Lima, he entered the Jesuit novitiate (12 April 1612). He was ordained a priest in 1618, in Lima, and later taught philosophy at the Jesuit College of Cusco, of which he was the rector from 1628 to 1630. Twice he was the rector of the Colegio Máximo de San Pablo de Lima: 1651-1662 and 1666-1669. Between the two he was vice-provincial and then provincial of the Jesuits of Peru (1663–1666).

== Works ==
His work Thesaurus Indicus is an extensive treatise that presents, among other topics, the debate between the Caesarean and theocratic currents that Avendaño had to face. Departing for the most part from a probabilist perspective, it gives the benefit of the probability to positions that go against theirs. In this sense, in the opinion of the scholar Gabriel Andrade Campo Redondo, he never completely discards a range of positions that, however, he himself does not accept.

Until the 1990s, Avendaño's work was virtually unknown, as being written in Latin, few contemporary authors had been interested in it. The Spanish-Venezuelan academic Ángel Muñoz García rescued original editions of Thesaurus Indicus has already published five volumes of the work between 2001 and 2010.

Diego de Avendaño is the only Spanish cited as abolitionist in the work of Henri Grégoire's De la littérature des negroes published in 1808. Another abolitionist, Joseph-Elzéar Morénas described him in 1828 as a person “......the Jesuit Avendaño, who wrote against the slave trade and in favour of the Indigenous peoples of the Americas. He stated unequivocally to the slave traders of his time that one could not, in good conscience, enslave negroes.”

=== Selected works ===
- Epithalamium Christi et Sacrae Sponsae (Lyon, 1653).
- Amphitheatrum misericordiae (Lyon, 1656).
- Cartas annuas de la Provincia del Perú de la Compañía de Jesús de los años 1663 a 1665 al R. P. General de la misma Compañía (manuscript, now lost).
- Expositio Psalmi LXVIII (Lyon, 1666).
- Thesaurus Indicus (Antwerp, 1668-1686).
- Auctarium Indicum (Antwerp, 1675-1686).
- Problemata theologica (Antwerp, 1678).
- Cursus consummatus (Antwerp, 1686).

== Sources ==
- G. Andrade, "En torno a Avendaño y Sahagún: diferentes encuentros con el Otro en la colonia", Revista de Filosofía 45:3 (2003): 7-25.
- F. Arvizu Y Galarraga, "El pensamiento jurídico del P. Diego de Avendaño S.I.: Notas de interés para el Derecho Indiano", IX Congreso del Instituto Internacional de Historia del Derecho Indiano. Actas y Estudios, vol. 1 (Madrid, 1991), pp. 137–150.
- J. Ballon, "Diego de Avendaño (1594-1688) y los orígenes coloniales de la filosofía en el Perú", Patio de Letras 2:2 (2004): 97-107.
- Vincent P. Franklin, "Alonso De Sandoval and the Jesuit Conception of the Negro", The Journal of Negro History 58:3 (1973): 349-360.
- P. Hernández Aparicio, "La doctrina de Avendaño sobre los repartimientos de indios", in Proyección y presencia de Segovia en América. Actas del Congreso Internacional (23-28 de abril de 1991), ed. M. Cuesta Domingo (Segovia, 1992), pp. 411–419.
- A. Losada, "Diego de Avendaño S. I. moralista y jurista, defensor de la dignidad humana de indios y negros en América", Missionalia Hispanica 15 (1982): 1-18.
- Angel Muñoz Garcia, Diego de Avendaño (1594-1698): filosofía, moralidad, derecho y política en el Perú colonial (Lima, 2003)
