= Rubén Taucare =

Chilean footballer (born 1982)

Personal information
- Full name: Rubén Andrés Taucare Espinoza
- Date of birth: 5 July 1982 (age 44)
- Place of birth: Iquique, Chile
- Height: 1.82 m (6 ft 0 in)
- Position: Centre back

Youth career
- 1994–1997: Cobreloa
- 1997–1999: Deportes Iquique

Senior career*
Years	Team	Apps	(Gls)
1999–2000	Deportes Iquique	22	(0)
2001	Universidad de Concepción		
2002–2004	Huachipato	70	(3)
2005–2010	Municipal Iquique	101	(14)
2011–2014	Deportes Iquique	59	(0)

Managerial career
- 2025: Deportes Iquique (youth)
- 2025–: Deportes Iquique (assistant)
- * Club domestic league appearances and goals

Rubén Andrés Taucare Espinoza (born 5 July 1982) is a Chilean former footballer who played as a centre back.

== Playing career ==
Taucare made his debut playing for Deportes Iquique in the 1999 Chilean Primera División.

== Coaching career ==
Taucare assumed as coach of the Deportes Iquique under-15 team in May 2025. In October of the same year, he assumed as assistant coach of Rodrigo Guerrero for the senior team.

== Personal life ==
Taucare is of Mapuche descent.

== Honours ==
Deportes Iquique

- Primera B (1): 2010
- Copa Chile (2): 2010, 2013–14
