= Pablo Abdala (footballer) =

Palestinian footballer

Personal information
- Full name: Pablo Andrés Abdala Kovasevic
- Date of birth: May 6, 1972 (age 54)
- Place of birth: Rosario, Argentina
- Height: 1.72 m (5 ft 7 1/2 in)
- Position: Midfielder

Team information
- Current team: Cobreloa (youth manager)

Youth career
- Rosario Central

Senior career*
Years	Team	Apps	(Gls)
1993	Rosario Central	4	(0)
1994	Deportes Arica	28	(1)
1995–1996	Millonarios	13	(0)
1997	Técnico Universitario	10	(0)
1997–2003	Cobreloa	128	(3)
2003	Universidad de Concepción	13	(0)
2004	Deportes Temuco	5	(0)
2005	Deportes Melipilla	27	(0)
2006-2007	Argentino de Rosario	8	(0)
Total		236	(4)

International career
2002–2006	Palestine	18	(0)

Managerial career
- 2021: Cobreloa (assistant)
- 2023–: Cobreloa (youth)
- 2024: Cobreloa (caretaker)
- * Club domestic league appearances and goals

Pablo Andrés Abdala Kovasevic (Arabic: بابلو عبد الله; born 6 May 1972) is a football manager and former player who played as a midfielder. He is the current manager of Cobreloa's youth categories.

Born in Argentina, Abdala represented the Palestine national team.

== Playing career ==
Born in Rosario, Abdala started his career with Rosario Central in his homeland. He spent almost all his career abroad playing in Chile, Colombia and Ecuador.

A historical player of Cobreloa, he also played for Deportes Arica, Universidad de Concepción, Deportes Temuco and Deportes Melipilla in Chile.

In Colombia, he played for Millonarios.

In Ecuador, he played for Técnico Universitario.

== Coaching career ==
In 2021, Abdala served as assistant of Rodrigo Meléndez in Cobreloa. In charge of the under-20 team, he assumed as caretaker coach after Emiliano Astorga left the club in May 2024.

== Personal life ==
He is of Palestinian (Abdala) and Croatian (Kovasevic or Kovacevic) origin.
