= Francisco Piña =

Chilean footballer (born 1988)

Personal information
- Full name: Francisco Javier Piña Correa
- Date of birth: 16 January 1988 (age 38)
- Place of birth: Calama, Chile
- Height: 1.71 m (5 ft 7 1/2 in)
- Position: Midfielder

Youth career
- Cobreloa

Senior career*
Years	Team	Apps	(Gls)
2006–2007	Cobreloa	10	(0)
2008	Fernández Vial	32	(11)
2009–2012	Unión San Felipe	39	(1)
2010	→ Unión La Calera (loan)	14	(1)
2011	→ San Marcos (loan)	36	(7)
2012	Unión San Felipe B	3	(0)
2012–2013	San Marcos	29	(8)
2013–2014	Curicó Unido	30	(3)
2014–2017	Deportes Temuco	78	(5)
2017–2018	Santiago Wanderers	24	(1)
2019–2021	Santiago Morning	38	(2)
Total		333	(39)

International career
2004	Chile U17		
- * Club domestic league appearances and goals

Francisco Javier Piña Correa (born January 16, 1988) is a Chilean former footballer who played as a midfielder.

== Career ==
He retired at the end of the 2021 season. His last club was Santiago Morning of the Primera B de Chile.

At international level, Piña took part in the Chile under-17 team in 2004.

== Titles ==
- Unión San Felipe 2009 Primera B de Chile and Copa Chile
- San Marcos de Arica 2012 Primera B de Chile
