= Colo Colo–Cobreloa rivalry =

Football rivalry in Chile

- Other names: Clásico Albo–Loíno (Spanish); Derby Albo–Loíno
- Location: Chile
- Teams: Colo-Colo, Cobreloa
- First meeting: Cobreloa 4–2 Colo-Colo; 1978 Campeonato Nacional (4 March 1978)
- Latest meeting: Cobreloa 0–1 Colo-Colo; 2024 Chilean Primera División (1 September 2024)
- Broadcasters: TNT Sports

Statistics
- Total meetings: 115
- All-time series: Official: Colo-Colo (43); Cobreloa (39)
- Largest victory: Colo-Colo 6–5 Cobreloa (2 February 1990); Cobreloa 5–2 Colo-Colo (27 January 2013)

The Colo Colo–Cobreloa rivalry also known as Clásico Albo-Loíno is a footballing rivalry between Chilean clubs Colo-Colo and Cobreloa. It is considered to be one of the biggest rivalry matches in Chile.
