= Fernando Avendaño =

Fernando Avendaño or Fernando de Avendaño (c. 1600 – 1665), born and died in Lima, Peru, was a Catholic priest.

He died shortly after being appointed Bishop of Santiago, Chile. He was an investigator into survivals of the primitive rites and customs of the Peruvian Indians. Fragments of his notes on the subject are preserved in the work of Pablo José Arriaga.

Avendaño's Sermones de los misterios de nuestra santa Fe católica were delivered in Quechua, and published alongside a Spanish translation in 1649 by the order of the Archbishop of Lima, Petro Villagomez.
