= Manuel Avendaño =

Chilean footballer (born 1982)

Manuel Valenzuela
Personal information
- Full name: Manuel Jesús Avendaño Valenzuela
- Date of birth: April 7, 1982 (age 44)
- Place of birth: Talca, Chile
- Height: 1.78 m (5 ft 10 in)
- Position: Defender

Senior career*
| Years | Team | Apps | (Gls) |
| 2001–2010 | Rangers | 168 | (5) |
| 2011–2012 | Curicó Unido | 27 | (0) |
| Total | | 195 | (5) |
Medal record
| Second place | Chilean Primera División - Apertura | 2002 |
- * Club domestic league appearances and goals

Manuel Jesús Avendaño Valenzuela (Note: In this Spanish name, the first or paternal surname is Avendaño and the second or maternal family name is Valenzuela.) (born April 7, 1982), known as Manuel Valenzuela, is a Chilean former footballer who played as a defender for Rangers de Talca and Curicó Unido.
