= 2019–20 Club Atlético Independiente season =

Independiente
2019–20 season
- President: Hugo Moyano
- Manager: Sebastián Beccacece
- Stadium: Estadio Libertadores de América
- Copa Sudamericana: Quarter-finals
- Top goalscorer: League: Sebastián Palacios (1); Silvio Romero (1); All: Silvio Romero (3)

The 2019–20 season is Independiente's 7th consecutive season in the top division of Argentine football. In addition to the Primera División, the club are competing in the Copa Argentina, Copa de la Superliga and Copa Sudamericana.

The season generally covers the period from 1 July 2019 to 30 June 2020.

== Review ==
=== Pre-season ===
Brown completed the loan signing of young midfielder Elías Contreras on 26 June 2019. Independiente purchased centre-back Alexander Barboza from River Plate on 29 June. Numerous loans from the previous campaign officially expired on and around 30 June. Saúl Nelle was loaned out to Nueva Chicago on 1 July. Temperley announced the incoming of Nicolás Messiniti on 2 July. A goal from Alan Franco helped them beat Temperley in their opening pre-season friendly on 3 July, which preceded a further victory soon after following strikes from Mauro Molina, Fernando Chávez and Diego Mercado. Hours later, Damián Martínez joined Unión Santa Fe permanently; having spent 2016–17 and 2017–18 on loan. Independiente failed to defeat Platense in two friendlies on 6 July.

Independiente communicated their second transaction on 8 July, as Cristian Chávez was captured from Aldosivi. Independiente fell to back-to-back exhibition losses on 10 July at home to Arsenal de Sarandí. Andrés Roa, who had been on loan with Huracán in the past season, was signed on a full-time contract from Deportivo Cali on 12 July. Nicolás Del Priore went out on loan to Villa Dálmine on 12 July. Independiente put eight goals past Aldosivi in pre-season matches on 13 July, though the secondary encounter was against their reserves. Lucas Albertengo headed on loan to Newell's Old Boys on 13 July. Fernando Gaibor agreed terms with Al-Wasl of the United Arab Emirates on 15 July. Tristán Suárez confirmed the loan of Mauricio del Castillo on 17 July.

Sergio Alegre, an attacking midfielder, left for Estudiantes (BA) on 19 July. Independiente lost to Newell's Old Boys in an opening friendly on 17 July, though responded with a victory later in the day thanks to a Silvio Romero hat-trick. On 20 July, Independiente met Temperley for the third time in pre-season, in Wilde, and played out a tie. Jony went off to Talleres on loan on 25 July. Sebastián Palacios transferred from Liga MX's Pachuca on 25 July.

=== July ===
Ecuador's Universidad Católica were defeated in the Copa Sudamericana round of sixteen on 25 July, as Pablo Hernández's goal gave Independiente a first leg advantage. Villa Dálmine signed reserve team player Sergio Díaz on 26 July. 28 July saw Independiente start their 2019–20 Primera División campaign with three points on the road against Defensa y Justicia.

=== August ===
Gonzalo Verón left on loan to Aldosivi on 1 August. Chilean central midfielder Francisco Silva made a return to his homeland on 2 August, as he agreed a contract with Universidad Católica. Newell's matchday two fixture with Newell's Old Boys in the Primera División and their Copa Argentina tie with Patronato were postponed in early August, due to scheduling conflicts with CONMEBOL regarding Independiente's quarter-final tie in the Copa Sudamericana. Lucas Romero became Independiente's fifth reinforcement for 2019–20 as he arrived from Brazil's Cruzeiro on 5 August. Independiente came from behind to defeat Independiente del Valle in a Copa Sudamericana quarter-final first leg on 6 August. Gastón del Castillo agreed a move to Atlético Saltillo Soccer on 9 August.

Independiente drew and lost to Gimnasia y Esgrima in friendlies on 10 August. Independiente were eliminated from the Copa Sudamericana on 13 August, as a Dani Nieto strike put Independiente del Valle through to the semi-finals on away goals. Independiente suffered their fourth competitive loss of 2019–20 on 19 August, as they conceded three unanswered goals away to Estudiantes in the Primera División. Independiente achieved their third win in four league matches on 24 August, having beaten Colón at home after a Lucas Acevedo own-goal was coupled with a late Lucas Romero strike. Independiente progressed through to the round of sixteen in the Copa Argentina on 28 August, eliminating Patronato after a narrow one-goal victory at the Estadio Único de Villa Mercedes.

Days later, on 31 August, Independiente and Patronato faced each other again in league action as Patronato reversed the scoreline.

== Squad ==
| Squad No. | Nationality | Name | Position(s) | Date of Birth (age) | Signed from |
Goalkeepers
| 1 | Argentina | Gonzalo Rehak | GK | 11 January 1994 (age 32) | Academy |
| 12 | Argentina | Franco Vélez | GK | 8 February 1997 (age 29) | Academy |
| 13 | Argentina | Milton Álvarez | GK | 26 January 1989 (age 37) | Deportivo Morón |
| 25 | Uruguay | Martín Campaña | GK | 29 May 1989 (age 37) | Defensor Sporting |
| 31 | Uruguay | Renzo Bacchia | GK | 23 January 1999 (age 27) | Academy |
Defenders
| 2 | Argentina | Alan Franco | CB | 11 October 1996 (age 30) | Academy |
| 3 | Argentina | Guillermo Burdisso | CB | 26 September 1988 (age 38) | Club León |
| 4 | Argentina | Nicolás Figal | CB | 3 April 1994 (age 32) | Academy |
| 16 | Argentina | Fabricio Bustos | RB | 28 April 1996 (age 30) | Academy |
| 20 | Uruguay | Gastón Silva | CB | 5 March 1994 (age 32) | Torino |
| 24 | Argentina | Sergio Barreto | CB | 20 April 1999 (age 27) | Academy |
| 26 | Argentina | Alexander Barboza | CB | 16 March 1995 (age 31) | River Plate |
| | Argentina | Juan Di Lorenzo | CB | 6 July 1998 (age 28) | Academy |
| | Argentina | Lucas Villalba | LB | 19 August 1994 (age 32) | Academy |
Midfielders
| 5 | Argentina | Nicolás Domingo | DM | 8 April 1985 (age 41) | River Plate |
| 6 | Argentina | Juan Sánchez Miño | CM | 1 January 1990 (age 36) | Torino |
| 7 | Colombia | Andrés Roa | AM | 25 May 1993 (age 33) | Deportivo Cali |
| 8 | Argentina | Pablo Pérez | RM | 10 August 1985 (age 41) | Boca Juniors (loan) |
| 9 | Argentina | Alan Velasco | AM | 27 July 2002 (age 24) | Academy |
| 14 | Argentina | Lucas González | MF | 27 July 1997 (age 29) | Academy |
| 15 | United States Argentina | Alan Soñora | MF | 3 August 1998 (age 28) | Academy |
| 19 | Chile Argentina | Pablo Hernández | CM | 24 October 1986 (age 40) | Celta |
| 21 | Uruguay | Carlos Benavídez | DM | 30 March 1998 (age 28) | Defensor Sporting |
| 22 | Argentina | Lucas Romero | CM | 18 April 1994 (age 32) | Cruzeiro |
| 23 | Argentina | Domingo Blanco | AM | 22 April 1995 (age 31) | Academy |
| 28 | Argentina | Cristian Chávez | LW | 4 June 1987 (age 39) | Aldosivi |
| | Argentina | Matías La Mastra | MF | 18 April 1997 (age 29) | Academy |
| | Argentina | Diego Mercado | DM | 3 January 1997 (age 29) | Academy |
| | Argentina | Julián Vitale | CM | 21 July 1995 (age 31) | Academy |
Forwards
| 10 | Argentina | Martín Benítez | LW | 17 June 1994 (age 32) | Academy |
| 11 | Paraguay | Cecilio Domínguez | LW | 11 August 1994 (age 32) | América |
| 18 | Argentina | Silvio Romero | CF | 22 July 1988 (age 38) | América |
| 26 | Argentina | Mauro Molina | CF | 29 July 1999 (age 27) | Academy |
| 29 | Argentina | Francisco Pizzini | RW | 19 September 1993 (age 33) | Academy |
| 34 | Argentina | Sebastián Palacios | RW | 20 January 1992 (age 34) | Pachuca |
| | Argentina | Ezequiel Denis | FW | 4 April 1996 (age 30) | Academy |
| | Argentina | Franco Shea | FW | 28 November 1997 (age 28) | Academy |
| | Argentina | Gastón Togni | LW | 20 September 1997 (age 29) | Academy |
| Out on loan | | | | | Loaned to |
| 30 | Argentina | Gonzalo Verón | CF | 24 December 1989 (age 36) | Aldosivi |
| | Argentina | Lucas Albertengo | CF | 30 January 1991 (age 35) | Newell's Old Boys |
| | Argentina | Gonzalo Asis | RB | 28 March 1996 (age 30) | Temperley |
| | Argentina | Elías Contreras | MF | 7 March 1997 (age 29) | Brown |
| | Argentina | Mauricio del Castillo | FW | 10 March 1996 (age 30) | Tristán Suárez |
| | Argentina | Nicolás Del Priore | AM | 14 August 1996 (age 30) | Villa Dálmine |
| | Argentina | Francisco Delorenzi | CB | 3 January 1998 (age 28) | Deportivo Cali |
| | Argentina | Leandro Fernández | LW | 12 March 1991 (age 35) | Vélez Sarsfield |
| | Ecuador | Fernando Gaibor | AM | 8 October 1991 (age 35) | Al-Wasl |
| | Argentina | Jony | LW | 5 March 1994 (age 32) | Talleres (loan) |
| | Argentina | Saúl Nelle | CM | 24 November 1993 (age 32) | Nueva Chicago |
| | Argentina | Braian Romero | CF | 15 June 1991 (age 35) | Athletico Paranaense |

== Transfers ==
Domestic transfer windows:
3 July 2019 to 24 September 2019
20 January 2020 to 19 February 2020.

=== Transfers in ===
| Date from | Position | Nationality | Name | From | Ref. |
|---|---|---|---|---|---|
| 3 July 2019 (Note: Deal agreed on 29 June 2019) | CB | Argentina | Alexander Barboza | River Plate | |
| 8 July 2019 | LW | Argentina | Cristian Chávez | Aldosivi | |
| 12 July 2019 | LW | Colombia | Andrés Roa | Deportivo Cali | |
| 25 July 2019 | RW | Argentina | Sebastián Palacios | Pachuca | |
| 5 August 2019 | CM | Argentina | Lucas Romero | Cruzeiro | |

=== Transfers out ===
| Date from | Position | Nationality | Name | To | Ref. |
|---|---|---|---|---|---|
| 3 July 2019 (Note: Deal agreed on 2 July 2019) | CF | Argentina | Nicolás Messiniti | Temperley | |
| 3 July 2019 | RB | Argentina | Damián Martínez | Unión Santa Fe | |
| 19 July 2019 | AM | Argentina | Sergio Alegre | Estudiantes (BA) | |
| 26 July 2019 | CB | Argentina | Sergio Díaz | Villa Dálmine | |
| 2 August 2019 | CM | Argentina | Francisco Silva | Universidad Católica | |
| 9 August 2019 | CF | Argentina | Gastón del Castillo | Atlético Saltillo Soccer | |

=== Loans out ===
| Start date | Position | Nationality | Name | To | End date | Ref. |
|---|---|---|---|---|---|---|
| 3 July 2019 (Note: Deal agreed on 26 June 2019) | MF | Argentina | Elías Contreras | Brown | 30 June 2020 | |
| 3 July 2019 (Note: Deal agreed on 29 June 2019) | RB | Argentina | Gonzalo Asis | Temperley | 30 June 2020 | |
| 3 July 2019 (Note: Deal agreed on 1 July 2019) | CM | Argentina | Saúl Nelle | Nueva Chicago | 30 June 2020 | |
| 12 July 2019 | AM | Argentina | Nicolás Del Priore | Villa Dálmine | 30 June 2020 | |
| 13 July 2019 | CF | Argentina | Lucas Albertengo | Newell's Old Boys | 30 June 2020 | |
| 15 July 2019 | AM | Ecuador | Fernando Gaibor | Al-Wasl | 30 June 2020 | |
| 17 July 2019 | FW | Argentina | Mauricio del Castillo | Tristán Suárez | 30 June 2020 | |
| 25 July 2019 | LW | Argentina | Jony | Talleres | 30 June 2020 | |
| 1 August 2019 | CF | Argentina | Gonzalo Verón | Aldosivi | 30 June 2020 | |

== Friendlies ==
=== Pre-season ===
Arsenal de Sarandí were revealed to be a pre-season opponent of Independiente on 11 June 2019, as were Aldosivi on 24 June. Matches with Temperley, Platense and Newell's Old Boys was scheduled for 3/6/17 July. An encounter match with Temperley was set for 21 July.

Win Draw Loss

| 3 July 2019 Friendly | Independiente | 1–0 | Temperley | Ezeiza, Argentina |
| | A. Franco | Independiente; Marca; 30 min. match | | Stadium: Complejo Deportivo de Ezeiza |

| 3 July 2019 Friendly | Independiente | 3–0 | Temperley | Ezeiza, Argentina |
| | M. Molina; F. Chávez; D. Mercado | Independiente; Marca; 30 min. match | | Stadium: Complejo Deportivo de Ezeiza |

| 6 July 2019 Friendly | Independiente | 0–0 | Platense | Ezeiza, Argentina |
| | | Independiente; Marca; 60 min. match | | Stadium: Complejo Deportivo de Ezeiza; Attendance: 0 (Note: Behind closed doors.) |

| 6 July 2019 Friendly | Independiente | 0–1 | Platense | Ezeiza, Argentina |
| | | Independiente; Marca; 60 min. match | G. Pugliese | Stadium: Complejo Deportivo de Ezeiza; Attendance: 0 (Note: Behind closed doors.) |

| 10 July 2019 Friendly | Independiente | 0–1 | Arsenal de Sarandí | Avellaneda, Argentina |
| | | Independiente; TyC Sports; 60 min. match | F. Torrent | Stadium: Estadio Libertadores de América; Attendance: 0 (Note: Behind closed doors.) |

| 10 July 2019 Friendly | Independiente | 0–1 | Arsenal de Sarandí | Avellaneda, Argentina |
| | | Independiente; TyC Sports; 60 min. match | A. Soñora | Stadium: Estadio Libertadores de América; Attendance: 0 (Note: Behind closed doors.) |

| 13 July 2019 Friendly | Independiente | 4–0 | Aldosivi | Avellaneda, Argentina |
| | P. Hernández; F. Pizzini; C. Domínguez; M. Benítez | Independiente; TyC Sports; 60 min. match | | Stadium: Estadio Libertadores de América |

| 13 July 2019 Friendly | Independiente | 4–0 | Aldosivi Reserves | Avellaneda, Argentina |
| | A. Soñora; A. Velasco; M. Molina | Independiente; TyC Sports; 60 min. match | | Stadium: Estadio Libertadores de América |

| 17 July 2019 Friendly | Independiente | 0–1 | Newell's Old Boys | Avellaneda, Argentina |
| | | Independiente; TyC Sports; 80 min. match | A. Rodríguez | Stadium: Estadio Libertadores de América |

| 17 July 2019 Friendly | Independiente | 3–0 | Newell's Old Boys | Avellaneda, Argentina |
| | S. Romero | Independiente; TyC Sports; 80 min. match | | Stadium: Estadio Libertadores de América |

| 21 July 2019 Friendly | Independiente | 1–1 | Temperley | Wilde, Argentina |
| | C. Chávez | Independiente; TyC Sports; 50 min. match | M. Guevgeozián | Stadium: Predio Villa Domínico |

=== Mid-season ===
Independiente travelled to Villa Domínico for friendlies with Gimnasia y Esgrima on 10 August.

Win Draw Loss

| 10 August 2019 Friendly | Gimnasia y Esgrima | 0–0 | Independiente | Villa Domínico, Argentina |
| | | Gimnasia y Esgrima; Grupo La Provincia; 30 min. match | | Stadium: Complejo Santa Domingo |

| 10 August 2019 Friendly | Gimnasia y Esgrima | 2–0 | Independiente | Villa Domínico, Argentina |
| | P. Velázquez; M. Caire | Gimnasia y Esgrima; Grupo La Provincia; 30 min. match | | Stadium: Complejo Santa Domingo |

== Competitions ==
=== Primera División ===
==== League table ====
| Pos | Team | Pld | W | D | L | GF | GA | GD | Pts |
|---|---|---|---|---|---|---|---|---|---|
| 12 | Talleres (C) | 23 | 10 | 4 | 9 | 34 | 30 | +4 | 34 |
| 13 | Estudiantes (LP) | 23 | 8 | 6 | 9 | 23 | 22 | +1 | 30 |
| 14 | Independiente | 23 | 8 | 5 | 10 | 27 | 25 | +2 | 29 |
| 15 | Atlético Tucumán | 23 | 7 | 8 | 8 | 22 | 25 | −3 | 29 |
| 16 | Unión | 23 | 7 | 6 | 10 | 21 | 30 | −9 | 27 |

Source: AFA
Rules for classification: 1) points; 2) play-off (only if needed to decide championship); 3) goal difference; 4) goals scored; 5) head-to-head points; 6) head-to-head goal difference; 7) head-to-head goals scored.

==== Relegation table ====
| Pos | Team | 2017–18 Pts | 2018–19 Pts | 2019–20 Pts | Total Pts | Total Pld | Avg | Relegation |
|---|---|---|---|---|---|---|---|---|
| 4 | Defensa y Justicia | 44 | 53 | 4 | 101 | 57 | 1.772 | |
| 5 | River Plate | 45 | 45 | 8 | 98 | 57 | 1.719 | |
| 6 | Independiente | 46 | 38 | 6 | 90 | 56 | 1.607 | |
| 7 | Godoy Cruz | 56 | 32 | 3 | 91 | 57 | 1.596 | |
| 8 | Talleres (C) | 46 | 33 | 10 | 89 | 57 | 1.561 | |

Source: AFA

==== Results summary ====
| Overall | | | | | | | | Home | | | | | | Away | | | | | |
| Pld | W | D | L | GF | GA | GD | Pts | W | D | L | GF | GA | GD | W | D | L | GF | GA | GD |
|---|---|---|---|---|---|---|---|---|---|---|---|---|---|---|---|---|---|---|---|
| 4 | 2 | 0 | 2 | 3 | 4 | −1 | 6 | 1 | 0 | 0 | 2 | 0 | +2 | 1 | 0 | 2 | 1 | 4 | −3 |

Last updated: 31 August 2019.
Source: Soccerway

==== Matches ====
The fixtures for the 2019–20 campaign were released on 10 July.

Win Draw Loss

| 28 July 2019 1 | Defensa y Justicia | 0–1 | Independiente | Buenos Aires, Argentina |
| 17:45 GMT-3 | | Independiente; Infobae; Soccerway | S. Palacios 33' | Stadium: Estadio Norberto "Tito" Tomaghello; Referee: Patricio Loustau (Argentina) |

| 5 August 2019 2 | Independiente | Postponed | Newell's Old Boys | Avellaneda, Argentina |
| 21:10 GMT-3 | | Infobae | | Stadium: Estadio Libertadores de América |

| 19 August 2019 2 | Estudiantes | 3–0 | Independiente | La Plata, Argentina |
| 20:00 GMT-3 | A. González 47'; D. García 72'; E. Kalinski 83' | Independiente; Infobae; Soccerway | | Stadium: Estadio Ciudad de La Plata; Referee: Néstor Pitana (Argentina) |

| 24 August 2019 3 | Independiente | 2–0 | Colón | Avellaneda, Argentina |
| 20:00 GMT-3 | L. Acevedo 12' (o.g.); S. Romero 90+4' | Independiente; Infobae; Soccerway | | Stadium: Estadio Libertadores de América; Referee: Diego Abal (Argentina) |

| 31 August 2019 4 | Patronato | 1–0 | Independiente | Paraná, Argentina |
| 17:45 GMT-3 | L. Comas 35' | Independiente; Infobae; Soccerway | | Stadium: Estadio Presbítero Bartolomé Grella; Referee: Silvio Trucco (Argentina) |

| 5 | Independiente | – | Lanús | Avellaneda, Argentina |
| | | | | Stadium: Estadio Libertadores de América |

=== Copa Argentina ===
Independiente were drawn to meet Patronato in the Copa Argentina R32.

Win Draw Loss

| 28 August 2019 (Note: Originally set for 14 August 2019.) R32 | Patronato | 0–1 | Independiente | Villa Mercedes, Argentina |
| 17:00 GMT-3 | | Independiente; Infobae; Soccerway | D. Blanco 57' | Stadium: Estadio Único de Villa Mercedes; Referee: Nicolás Lamolina (Argentina) |

=== Copa de la Superliga ===
Win Draw Loss

| | – |
| 00:00 GMT-3 |

=== Copa Sudamericana ===
==== 2019 Copa Sudamericana ====
Universidad Católica of the Ecuadorian Serie A were, on 3 June 2019, revealed to be Independiente's opponents in the Copa Sudamericana round of sixteen. They defeated Universidad Católica, which saw them advance to the quarter-finals where they'd face another trip to Ecuador in Independiente del Valle.

Win Draw Loss

| 25 July 2019 R16 L1 | Independiente | 1–0 | Universidad Católica | Avellaneda, Argentina |
| 21:30 GMT-3 | P. Hernández 55' | Independiente; Infobae; Soccerway | | Stadium: Estadio Libertadores de América; Referee: Jesús Valenzuela (Venezuela) |

| 1 August 2019 R16 L2 | Universidad Católica | 3–2 (3–3a agg.) | Independiente | Quito, Ecuador |
| 19:30 GMT-5 | B. Vides 20' (pen.); W. Chalá 79'; L. Amarilla 90+2' | Independiente; Infobae; Soccerway | M. Benítez 49'; P. Hernández 72' | Stadium: Estadio Olímpico Atahualpa; Referee: Piero Maza (Chile) |

| 6 August 2019 QF L1 | Independiente | 2–1 | Independiente del Valle | Avellaneda, Argentina |
| 21:30 GMT-3 | S. Romero 74' (pen.), 90+1' | Independiente; Infobae; Soccerway | J. Sánchez 60' | Stadium: Estadio Libertadores de América; Referee: Diego Haro (Peru) |

| 13 August 2019 QF L2 | Independiente del Valle | 1–0 (a2–2 agg.) | Independiente | Quito, Ecuador |
| 19:30 GMT-5 | D. Nieto 78' | Independiente; Infobae; Soccerway | | Stadium: Estadio Olímpico Atahualpa; Referee: Roberto Tobar (Chile) |

==== 2020 Copa Sudamericana ====
Win Draw Loss

| 13 February 2020 First stage L1 | Independiente (Argentina) | 1–0 | (Brazil) Fortaleza | Avellaneda, Argentina |
| 21:30 UTC−3 | Fernández 51' | Report | | Stadium: Estadio Libertadores de América; Referee: Wilmar Roldán (Colombia) |

| 27 February 2020 First stage L2 | Fortaleza (Brazil) | 2–1 (2–2a agg.) | (Argentina) Independiente | Fortaleza, Brazil |
| 21:30 UTC−3 | Juninho 27' (pen.); Marlon 79' | Report | Bruno Melo 90+3' (o.g.) | Stadium: Estádio Castelão; Referee: Roberto Tobar (Chile) |

The tournament was suspended after its first round due to the COVID-19 pandemic and resumed on 27 October 2020.

== Squad statistics ==
=== Appearances and goals ===
| No. | Pos. | Nationality | Name | League | | Cup | | League Cup | | Continental | | Total | | Discipline | | Ref |
| No. | Pos. | Nationality | Name | Apps | Goals | Apps | Goals | Apps | Goals | Apps | Goals | Apps | Goals | Yellow card | Red card | Ref |
|---|---|---|---|---|---|---|---|---|---|---|---|---|---|---|---|---|
| 1 | GK | Argentina | Gonzalo Rehak | 0 | 0 | 0 | 0 | 0 | 0 | 0 | 0 | 0 | 0 | 0 | 0 | |
| 2 | CB | Argentina | Alan Franco | 2 | 0 | 0(1) | 0 | 0 | 0 | 2 | 0 | 4(1) | 0 | 0 | 0 | |
| 3 | CB | Argentina | Guillermo Burdisso | 0 | 0 | 0 | 0 | 0 | 0 | 0 | 0 | 0 | 0 | 0 | 0 | |
| 4 | CB | Argentina | Nicolás Figal | 4 | 0 | 1 | 0 | 0 | 0 | 3 | 0 | 8 | 0 | 6 | 1 | |
| 5 | DM | Argentina | Nicolás Domingo | 1(1) | 0 | 1 | 0 | 0 | 0 | 3 | 0 | 5(1) | 0 | 1 | 0 | |
| 6 | CM | Argentina | Juan Sánchez Miño | 4 | 0 | 1 | 0 | 0 | 0 | 3 | 0 | 8 | 0 | 1 | 0 | |
| 7 | AM | Colombia | Andrés Roa | 0(1) | 0 | 0 | 0 | 0 | 0 | 0(1) | 0 | 0(2) | 0 | 0 | 0 | |
| 8 | RM | Argentina | Pablo Pérez | 3 | 0 | 1 | 0 | 0 | 0 | 1(1) | 0 | 5(1) | 0 | 3 | 0 | |
| 9 | AM | Argentina | Alan Velasco | 0 | 0 | 0 | 0 | 0 | 0 | 0(1) | 0 | 0(1) | 0 | 0 | 0 | |
| 10 | LW | Argentina | Martín Benítez | 3 | 0 | 0(1) | 0 | 0 | 0 | 2(1) | 0 | 5(2) | 0 | 0 | 0 | |
| 11 | LW | Paraguay | Cecilio Domínguez | 2(2) | 0 | 0 | 0 | 0 | 0 | 2 | 0 | 4(2) | 0 | 0 | 0 | |
| 12 | GK | Argentina | Franco Vélez | 0 | 0 | 0 | 0 | 0 | 0 | 0 | 0 | 0 | 0 | 0 | 0 | |
| 13 | GK | Argentina | Milton Álvarez | 0 | 0 | 0 | 0 | 0 | 0 | 0 | 0 | 0 | 0 | 0 | 0 | |
| 14 | LW | Argentina | Lucas González | 0 | 0 | 0 | 0 | 0 | 0 | 0(1) | 0 | 0(1) | 0 | 0 | 0 | |
| 15 | MF | United States Argentina | Alan Soñora | 0 | 0 | 0 | 0 | 0 | 0 | 0 | 0 | 0 | 0 | 0 | 0 | |
| 16 | RB | Argentina | Fabricio Bustos | 2(2) | 0 | 1 | 0 | 0 | 0 | 3 | 0 | 6(2) | 0 | 1 | 0 | |
| 18 | CF | Argentina | Silvio Romero | 2 | 1 | 1 | 0 | 0 | 0 | 0(3) | 2 | 3(3) | 3 | 0 | 0 | |
| 19 | CM | Chile Argentina | Pablo Hernández | 0 | 0 | 0 | 0 | 0 | 0 | 2 | 1 | 2 | 1 | 1 | 0 | |
| 20 | CB | Uruguay | Gastón Silva | 2(1) | 0 | 1 | 0 | 0 | 0 | 3 | 0 | 6(1) | 0 | 1 | 0 | |
| 21 | DM | Uruguay | Carlos Benavídez | 0 | 0 | 0 | 0 | 0 | 0 | 0 | 0 | 0 | 0 | 0 | 0 | |
| 22 | CM | Argentina | Lucas Romero | 3 | 0 | 0 | 0 | 0 | 0 | 0 | 0 | 3 | 0 | 0 | 0 | |
| 23 | AM | Argentina | Domingo Blanco | 4 | 0 | 1 | 1 | 0 | 0 | 0 | 0 | 5 | 1 | 1 | 0 | |
| 24 | CB | Argentina | Sergio Barreto | 0 | 0 | 0 | 0 | 0 | 0 | 0 | 0 | 0 | 0 | 0 | 0 | |
| 25 | GK | Uruguay | Martín Campaña | 4 | 0 | 1 | 0 | 0 | 0 | 3 | 0 | 8 | 0 | 0 | 0 | |
| 26 | CB | Argentina | Alexander Barboza | 3 | 0 | 1 | 0 | 0 | 0 | 0 | 0 | 4 | 0 | 2 | 0 | |
| 28 | LW | Argentina | Cristian Chávez | 0(4) | 0 | 0 | 0 | 0 | 0 | 1(1) | 0 | 1(5) | 0 | 0 | 0 | |
| 29 | RW | Argentina | Francisco Pizzini | 1 | 0 | 0(1) | 0 | 0 | 0 | 3 | 0 | 4(1) | 0 | 0 | 0 | |
| 30 | CF | Argentina | Gonzalo Verón | 0 | 0 | 0 | 0 | 0 | 0 | 0 | 0 | 0 | 0 | 0 | 0 | |
| 31 | GK | Uruguay | Renzo Bacchia | 0 | 0 | 0 | 0 | 0 | 0 | 0 | 0 | 0 | 0 | 0 | 0 | |
| 34 | RW | Argentina | Sebastián Palacios | 4 | 1 | 1 | 0 | 0 | 0 | 2 | 0 | 7 | 1 | 1 | 0 | |
| – | CF | Argentina | Lucas Albertengo | 0 | 0 | 0 | 0 | 0 | 0 | 0 | 0 | 0 | 0 | 0 | 0 | |
| – | RB | Argentina | Gonzalo Asis | 0 | 0 | 0 | 0 | 0 | 0 | 0 | 0 | 0 | 0 | 0 | 0 | |
| – | MF | Argentina | Elías Contreras | 0 | 0 | 0 | 0 | 0 | 0 | 0 | 0 | 0 | 0 | 0 | 0 | |
| – | FW | Argentina | Mauricio del Castillo | 0 | 0 | 0 | 0 | 0 | 0 | 0 | 0 | 0 | 0 | 0 | 0 | |
| – | AM | Argentina | Nicolás Del Priore | 0 | 0 | 0 | 0 | 0 | 0 | 0 | 0 | 0 | 0 | 0 | 0 | |
| – | CB | Argentina | Francisco Delorenzi | 0 | 0 | 0 | 0 | 0 | 0 | 0 | 0 | 0 | 0 | 0 | 0 | |
| – | FW | Argentina | Ezequiel Denis | 0 | 0 | 0 | 0 | 0 | 0 | 0 | 0 | 0 | 0 | 0 | 0 | |
| – | CB | Argentina | Juan Di Lorenzo | 0 | 0 | 0 | 0 | 0 | 0 | 0 | 0 | 0 | 0 | 0 | 0 | |
| – | LW | Argentina | Leandro Fernández | 0 | 0 | 0 | 0 | 0 | 0 | 0 | 0 | 0 | 0 | 0 | 0 | |
| – | AM | Ecuador | Fernando Gaibor | 0 | 0 | 0 | 0 | 0 | 0 | 0 | 0 | 0 | 0 | 0 | 0 | |
| – | LW | Argentina | Jony | 0 | 0 | 0 | 0 | 0 | 0 | 0 | 0 | 0 | 0 | 0 | 0 | |
| – | MF | Argentina | Matías La Mastra | 0 | 0 | 0 | 0 | 0 | 0 | 0 | 0 | 0 | 0 | 0 | 0 | |
| – | DM | Argentina | Diego Mercado | 0 | 0 | 0 | 0 | 0 | 0 | 0 | 0 | 0 | 0 | 0 | 0 | |
| – | CF | Argentina | Mauro Molina | 0 | 0 | 0 | 0 | 0 | 0 | 0 | 0 | 0 | 0 | 0 | 0 | |
| – | CM | Argentina | Saúl Nelle | 0 | 0 | 0 | 0 | 0 | 0 | 0 | 0 | 0 | 0 | 0 | 0 | |
| – | CF | Argentina | Braian Romero | 0 | 0 | 0 | 0 | 0 | 0 | 0 | 0 | 0 | 0 | 0 | 0 | |
| – | FW | Argentina | Franco Shea | 0 | 0 | 0 | 0 | 0 | 0 | 0 | 0 | 0 | 0 | 0 | 0 | |
| – | LW | Argentina | Gastón Togni | 0 | 0 | 0 | 0 | 0 | 0 | 0 | 0 | 0 | 0 | 0 | 0 | |
| – | LB | Argentina | Lucas Villalba | 0 | 0 | 0 | 0 | 0 | 0 | 0 | 0 | 0 | 0 | 0 | 0 | |
| – | CM | Argentina | Julián Vitale | 0 | 0 | 0 | 0 | 0 | 0 | 0 | 0 | 0 | 0 | 0 | 0 | |
| Own goals | | | | — | 0 | — | 0 | — | 0 | — | 0 | — | 0 | — | — | — |
Players who left during the season
| – | CF | Argentina | Gastón del Castillo | 0 | 0 | 0 | 0 | 0 | 0 | 0 | 0 | 0 | 0 | 0 | 0 | |

Statistics accurate as of 31 August 2019.

=== Goalscorers ===
| Rank | Pos | No. | Nat | Name | League | Cup | League Cup | Continental | Total | Ref |
|---|---|---|---|---|---|---|---|---|---|---|
| 1 | CF | 18 | Argentina | Silvio Romero | 1 | 0 | 0 | 2 | 3 | |
| 2 | CM | 19 | Chile Argentina | Pablo Hernández | 0 | 0 | 0 | 1 | 1 | |
| 2 | RW | 34 | Argentina | Sebastián Palacios | 1 | 0 | 0 | 0 | 1 | |
| 2 | AM | 23 | Argentina | Domingo Blanco | 0 | 1 | 0 | 0 | 1 | |
| Own goals | | | | | 1 | 0 | 0 | 0 | 1 | |
| Totals | | | | | 3 | 1 | 0 | 3 | 7 | — |
