= Domingo Martínez =

Domingo Martínez may refer to:

- Domingo Martínez (baseball) (born 1965), former baseball player
- Domingo Martínez (footballer) (born 1982), Paraguayan footballer
- Domingo Martinez (author), Mexican-American author known for his memoirs (2012)
- Domingo Martínez de Irala (c. 1509–c. 1556), Spanish Basque conquistador
- Domingo Martinez (politician), American politician and New Mexico State Auditor
