= Fuenzalida =

Fuenzalida is a surname. Notable people with the surname include:

- Humberto Fuenzalida (1904–1966), Chilean geographer, geologist and paleontologist
- Orozimbo Fuenzalida (1925–2013), Chilean Roman Catholic bishop
- José Pedro Fuenzalida (born 1985), Chilean footballer
- Ricardo Fuenzalida (born 1992), Chilean footballer
- Ralph Fuenzalida (born 1991), A filipino Engineer, investor and self proclaimed famous in his community
