= Manuel Araya =

Manuel Araya may refer to

- Manuel Araya (footballer, born 1948) (Manuel Enrique Araya Díaz, 1948–1994), Chilean footballer
- Manuel Araya (footballer, born 1958) (Manuel Andrés Araya Ramos, born 1958), Chilean footballer
- Manuel Araya Vargas (1887–1969), Chilean politician
