= Nelson Garrido =

Chilean footballer

Personal information
- Full name: Nelson Omar Garrido Muñoz
- Date of birth: 12 February 1977 (age 49)
- Place of birth: Curicó, Chile
- Position: Left-back

Youth career
- 1992–1993: Universidad Católica

Senior career*
| Years | Team | Apps | (Gls) |
| 1994–1998 | Universidad Católica | 63 | (1) |
| 1999 | Coquimbo Unido | 18 | (1) |
| 2000 | Ñublense | | |
| 2001 | Rangers | 18 | (2) |
| 2002 | Cobresal | 21 | (0) |

International career
| 1993 | Chile U17 | 13 | (0) |
| 1995 | Chile U20 | 8 | (0) |

Managerial career
- 2011–2014: Chile U15 (fitness coach)
- 2014–2015: Chile U20 (fitness coach)
- 2016–2017: Palestino (fitness coach)
- 2017–2018: Santiago Wanderers (fitness coach)
- 2018–2019: Universitario (fitness coach)
- 2020: Al-Kharaitiyat (fitness coach)
- 2021–2023: Chile U17 (fitness coach)
- 2023: Ñublense (fitness coach)
- 2024–: Deportes Santa Cruz (youth) (director)
- 2025: Deportes Santa Cruz (caretaker)
- 2026: Deportes Santa Cruz (caretaker)
- * Club domestic league appearances and goals

Nelson Omar Garrido Muñoz (born 12 February 1977) is a Chilean former footballer who played as a left-back.

== Club career ==
Born in Curicó, Chile, Garrido joined the Universidad Católica youth ranks in 1992 and made his senior debut in a friendly against Argentinos Juniors in 1994 under Manuel Pellegrini. With them, he won the 1995 Copa Chile and the 1997 Torneo Apertura.

Once Garrido left Universidad Católica in 1998, he played for Coquimbo Unido, Ñublense, Rangers de Talca and Cobresal, mainly in the Chilean Primera División.

== International career ==
In 1993, Garrido represented Chile at under-17 level in both the South American Championship and the 1993 FIFA World Cup, where Chile reached the third place.

Later, he represented the under 20's in the 1995 South American Championship and the 1995 FIFA World Cup.

== Coaching career ==
Garrido has developed a career as a fitness coach for the Chile youth national teams and clubs in Chile and abroad such as Universitario and Al-Kharaitiyat. With Al-Kharaitiyat, he won the 2019–20 Qatari Second Division.

In April 2024, Garrido was appointed as head of the Deportes Santa Cruz youth system. He assumed as caretaker manager of the senior team replacing Felipe Núñez in May 2025 and replacing John Armijo in April 2026.
