= Mirko Serrano =

Chilean footballer (born 1991)

Personal information
- Full name: Mirko Matías Serrano Panes
- Date of birth: 28 May 1991 (age 35)
- Place of birth: El Salvador, Chile
- Height: 1.78 m (5 ft 10 in)
- Position: Midfielder

Youth career
- Cobresal

Senior career*
Years	Team	Apps	(Gls)
2011–2012	Cobresal	1	(0)
2013–2014	Deportes Melipilla	39	(4)
2014–2015	Lota Schwager	15	(0)
2015–2017	Unión La Calera	45	(3)
2017–2019	Magallanes	49	(0)
2020–2021	Deportes Santa Cruz	23	(0)
2021–2022	San Marcos	40	(0)
2023	Deportes Melipilla	23	(0)
2024	Provincial Ovalle	23	(1)
- * Club domestic league appearances and goals as of 2 February 2026

Mirko Matías Serrano Panes (born 28 de mayo 1991) is a Chilean footballer who plays as a midfielder.

== Career ==
In 2021, Serrano signed with San Marcos de Arica.

In 2024, he signed with Provincial Ovalle in the Segunda División Profesional de Chile.
