= Diego Arias =

Diego Arias may refer to:

- Diego Arias de Miranda (1845–1929), Spanish politician
- Diego Arias (Colombian footballer) (born 1985), Colombian football defensive midfielder
- Diego Arias (Chilean footballer) (born 1999), Chilean football forward
- Diego Arias (cyclist), Colombian mountain biker
