= Nazareno Romero =

Argentine footballer

Personal information
- Full name: Nazareno Andrés Romero
- Date of birth: 26 February 2000 (age 26)
- Place of birth: Monte Grande, Buenos Aires, Argentina
- Height: 1.72 m (5 ft 8 in)
- Position: Left-back

Team information
- Current team: Deportes Santa Cruz

Youth career
- 2004–2007: Los Robles
- 2007–2021: Vélez Sarsfield

Senior career*
Years	Team	Apps	(Gls)
2021–2023	Vélez Sarsfield	8	(0)
2022	→ Rosario Central (loan)	2	(0)
2023	→ Ferro Carril Oeste (loan)	10	(0)
2024	Deportivo Cuenca	21	(1)
2025	Orense	14	(0)
2026–	Deportes Santa Cruz	0	(0)

International career
2015	Argentina U15		
- * Club domestic league appearances and goals as of 19 March 2026

Nazareno Andrés Romero (born 26 February 2000) is an Argentine footballer who plays as a left-back for Chilean club Deportes Santa Cruz.

== Club career ==
Born in Monte Grande, Buenos Aires, Argentina, Romero was with club Los Robles before joining Vélez Sarsfield at the age of 7. He made his professional debut in 2021 under Mauricio Pellegrino. He was loaned out to Rosario Central and Ferro Carril Oeste in 2022 and 2023, respectively.

In February 2024, Romero moved to Ecuador and joined Deportivo Cuenca. The next year, he switched to Orense.

In March 2026, Romero moved to Chile and signed with Chilean club Deportes Santa Cruz.

== International career ==
In 2015, Romero was called up to the Argentina under-15 team.
