= Deportes Santa Cruz =

Chilean football club

- Full name: Club de Deportes Santa Cruz
- Nickname: Santacruzanos
- Founded: May 25, 1913
- Ground: Estadio Municipal Joaquín Muñoz García; Santa Cruz, Chile
- Capacity: 3,500
- Chairman: Cristian San Miguel
- Manager: Nelson Garrido
- League: Primera B
- 2025: Primera B, 14th of 16
Home colours	Away colours

Club de Deportes Santa Cruz is a football club based in Santa Cruz, Chile. The club currently plays in the Chilean Primera Division B, the second tier of Chilean football. The club was founded on May 25, 1913 as Unión Comercio. In 1983 the club was rechristened Unión Santa Cruz and a second time in 1998 to the current club name.

== Managers ==
- (Chile) Gustavo Velásquez (1989)
- (Chile) Jorge González (1991)
- (Chile) Víctor Adriazola (1993)
- (Chile) Eugenio Jara (1993-1995)
- (Chile) Guillermo Duarte (1996)
- (Chile) Hernán Godoy (1996-1997)
- (Chile) Eugenio Jara (1997)
- (Chile) Sergio Martínez (1998)
- (Chile) Ítalo Díaz (2007)
- (Chile) Christian Muñoz (2008)
- (Chile) Manuel López (2010)
- (Chile) Francisco Bozán (2011)
- (Chile) Manuel López (2011-2013)
- (Chile) Ítalo Díaz (2013)
- (Chile) Jaime Riveros (2014-2015)
- (Chile) Gustavo Huerta (2016-2017)
- (Chile) Ronnie Radonich (2017)
- (Chile) Osvaldo Hurtado (2017-2022)
- (Chile) Fabián Pacheco (2022)
- (Argentina) Héctor Adomaitis (2022)
- (Chile) Fabián Marzuca (2023)
- (Chile) Hernán Peña (2023-2024)
- (Chile) Felipe Núñez (2025)
- (Chile) Nelson Garrido (2025)
- (Chile) John Armijo (2025-2026)
- (Chile) Nelson Garrido (2026)
- (Argentina) Dalcio Giovagnoli (2026-)

== Current squad ==
According to ESPN, the squad has been in flux.

Current squad of Deportes Santa Cruz as of 6 August 2026 (edit)
Sources: Deportes Santa Cruz Official Web Site

No.		Position	Player
1	CHI	GK	Maximiliano Henríquez
2	CHI	DF	Icker Quiroz
3	CHI	DF	Nicolás Guerrero
4	CHI	DF	Gino Alucema
5	ARG	DF	Braian Camisassa
6	CHI	MF	Felipe Orellana
7	CHI	FW	Cristian Pardo
8	CHI	MF	Diego Acevedo
9	ARG	FW	Nadir Zeineddin
10	URU	MF	Santiago Mederos
11	CHI	FW	Mathías Pinto
12	CHI	DF	Felipe Alvarado
13	CHI	FW	Benjamín Faúndez
14	CHI	MF	Diego Plaza
15	CHI	DF	Juan Delgado
16	CHI	FW	Joaquín González
18	CHI	MF	Hugo Herrera

No.		Position	Player
19	CHI	DF	Esteban Flores
20	CHI	DF	Hardy Cavero
21	CHI	FW	Joahn Saavedra
22	CHI	DF	David Tati
23	CHI	FW	Nicolás Barrios
24	CHI	MF	Benjamin Miranda
25	CHI	MF	Gabriel Moya
26	CHI	FW	Cristóbal Moreno
28	CHI	GK	Martín Quezada
29	ARG	GK	Juan Dobboletta (c)
30	CHI	FW	Diego Arias
31	ARG	DF	Nazareno Romero
32	CHI	MF	Jonathan Henríquez
34	CHI	MF	Cristóbal Castillo
–	CHI	FW	Pablo Brito
–	PLE	FW	Yashir Islame

Manager: Dalcio Giovagnoli

=== 2021 Summer transfers ===
==== In ====
Note: Flags indicate national team as defined under FIFA eligibility rules; some limited exceptions apply. Players may hold more than one non-FIFA nationality.

No.	Pos.	Nation	Player
2	DF	CHI	Gastón Zúñiga (loan from O'Higgins)
3	DF	CHI	Cristóbal Vergara (from Deportes Temuco)
4	DF	CHI	José Martínez (from Barnechea)
7	FW	CHI	César González (from Magallanes)
9	FW	ARG	Cristian Duma (from Salamanca UDS)
10	FW	CHI	Bryan Taiva (from Deportes Temuco)
11	MF	ARG	Albano Becica (from Rangers)
14	MF	CHI	Diego Pezoa (from Rangers)
16	GK	ARG	Manuel García (from Deportes Recoleta)

No.	Pos.	Nation	Player
17	FW	CHI	Ricardo Fuenzalida (from Deportes Melipilla)
18	MF	CHI	Alonso Rodríguez (from Independiente de Cauquenes)
19	DF	CHI	Esteban Flores (from Deportes Puerto Montt)
21	DF	CHI	Joaquín Aros (from Deportes Temuco)
22	FW	CHI	David Henríquez (loan from Universidad Católica)
23	DF	CHI	Sebastián Navarro (from Arturo Prat Hualañé)
26	DF	CHI	Ronald Guzmán (loan from O'Higgins)
33	MF	CHI	Luciano Gaete (from Rangers)

==== Out ====
Note: Flags indicate national team as defined under FIFA eligibility rules; some limited exceptions apply. Players may hold more than one non-FIFA nationality.

No.	Pos.	Nation	Player
2	DF	CHI	Braulio Ávalos (to Fernández Vial)
3	MF	ARG	Mauro Aguirre (released)
5	DF	CHI	Fidel Córdova (to Deportes Colina)
6	MF	ARG	Javier Bayk (loan return to Deportes La Serena)
7	FW	CHI	Diego Huerta (to Deportes Limache)
9	FW	CHI	David Salazar (loan return to O'Higgins)
10	MF	CHI	Ronaldo Abarca (released)
11	FW	COL	Alexander Valencia (loan return to Universidad de Chile)
12	GK	CHI	Matías Olguín (to Deportes Recoleta)
14	MF	CHI	Bryan Rojas (to Deportes Recoleta)

No.	Pos.	Nation	Player
16	MF	CHI	Francisco Arenas (to Coquimbo Unido)
17	DF	CHI	Diego Díaz (retired)
18	MF	CHI	Fabián Carmona (to Audax Italiano)
19	DF	CHI	Diego Silva (to Deportes Recoleta)
20	GK	CHI	Ignacio Azúa (to Independiente de Cauquenes)
22	DF	CHI	Benjamín Jerez (loan return to Colo-Colo)
23	MF	CHI	Carlos Cisternas (to Rodelindo Román)
29	FW	ARG	Mauro Siergiejuk (to Sportivo Las Parejas)
30	MF	CHI	Mirko Serrano (to San Marcos)
32	MF	ARG	Nicolás Del Priore (loan return to Independiente)
