= Nicolás Díaz (footballer) =

Chilean footballer (born 1999)

Personal information
- Full name: Nicolás Andrés Díaz Huincales
- Date of birth: 20 May 1999 (age 27)
- Place of birth: San Ramón, Santiago, Chile
- Height: 1.80 m (5 ft 11 in)
- Position: Defender

Team information
- Current team: Alianza Lima (on loan from Tijuana)

Youth career
- Palestino

Senior career*
Years	Team	Apps	(Gls)
2017–2019	Palestino	36	(0)
2020	Morelia	0	(0)
2020	→ Palestino (loan)	4	(0)
2020–2022	Mazatlán	55	(5)
2022–	Tijuana	70	(0)
2025	→ Unión Española (loan)	10	(0)
2025–2026	→ Puebla (loan)	28	(0)
2026–	→ Alianza Lima (loan)	0	(0)

International career^{‡}
2020–	Chile	5	(0)
- * Club domestic league appearances and goals as of 1 July 2025 ‡ National team caps and goals as of 19:00, 29 January 2022 (UTC)

Nicolás Andrés Díaz Huincales (born 20 May 1999) is a Chilean professional footballer who plays as a defender for Peruvian club Alianza Lima on loan from Liga MX club Tijuana.

== Club career ==
In June 2022, Díaz joined Tijuana. In 2025, he was loaned out to Chilean club Unión Española and Puebla. In July 2026, he switched to Peruvian club Alianza Lima.

== International career ==
Díaz made his senior national team debut on 8 October 2020 in a World Cup qualifier game against Uruguay.

== Personal life ==
He is the son of the former Chile international Ítalo Díaz. His older brother, Paulo, is also a Chile international footballer.

Díaz Huincales is of Mapuche descent.

== Honours ==
Palestino

- Copa Chile (1): 2018
