= Gino Alucema =

Chilean footballer (born 1992)

Personal information
- Full name: Gino Paolo Alucema Dinamarca
- Date of birth: 26 September 1992 (age 34)
- Place of birth: Viña del Mar, Chile
- Position: Defensive midfielder

Team information
- Current team: Deportes Santa Cruz

Youth career
- Everton

Senior career*
Years	Team	Apps	(Gls)
2011–2021	Everton	110	(0)
2019	→ Deportes Puerto Montt (loan)	21	(0)
2020–2021	→ Magallanes (loan)	25	(1)
2021–2022	Magallanes	39	(2)
2023–2024	Barnechea	45	(2)
2025	Magallanes	15	(1)
2026–	Deportes Santa Cruz	0	(0)
- * Club domestic league appearances and goals as of 6 January 2026

Gino Paolo Alucema Dinamarca (born 26 September 1992) is a Chilean footballer who plays as a defensive midfielder for Primera B de Chile side Deportes Santa Cruz.

== Career ==
On 5 January 2025, Alucema joined Deportes Santa Cruz.
