= Matías Olguín =

Chilean footballer

Personal information
- Full name: Matías Alejandro Olguín Lucero
- Date of birth: 20 March 1996 (age 30)
- Place of birth: Santiago, Chile
- Height: 1.85 m (6 ft 1 in)
- Position: Goalkeeper

Team information
- Current team: Cobresal
- Number: 36

Youth career
- 2011–2014: Santiago Morning

Senior career*
| Years | Team | Apps | (Gls) |
| 2014–2015 | Santiago Morning | 0 | (0) |
| 2016 | Estación Central | – | (–) |
| 2017 | Brujas de Salamanca | – | (–) |
| 2018–2021 | Deportes Santa Cruz | 4 | (0) |
| 2021–2022 | Deportes Recoleta | 27 | (0) |
| 2023 | San Antonio Unido | 11 | (0) |
| 2024 | Santiago Morning | 0 | (0) |
| 2025 | Brujas de Salamanca | 23 | (0) |
| 2026 | Magallanes | 3 | (0) |
| 2026– | Cobresal | 8 | (0) |
- * Club domestic league appearances and goals as of 12 October 2026

Matías Alejandro Olguín Lucero (born 20 March 1996) is a Chilean professional footballer who plays as a goalkeeper for Chilean Primera División club Cobresal.

== Club career ==
Born in Santiago, Chile, Olguín joined the Santiago Morning youth ranks at the age of 16. Following Santiago Morning, he played for Deportivo Estación Central and Brujas de Salamanca in the Tercera A in 2016 and 2017, respectively.

The next years, Olguín spent seasons with Deportes Santa Cruz, Deportes Recoleta, San Antonio Unido, Santiago Morning and Brujas de Salamanca between 2018 and 2025. He won the Segunda División Profesional de Chile in with Deportes Santa Cruz in 2018 and Deportes Recoleta in 2021.

In February 2026, Olguín signed with Magallanes and switched to Cobresal in the Liga de Primera in July of the same year.
