= Antonio Castillo (footballer) =

Chilean footballer

Personal information
- Full name: Antonio Andrés Castillo Navarrete
- Date of birth: 15 November 1998 (age 27)
- Place of birth: Futrono, Chile
- Height: 1.75 m (5 ft 9 in)
- Position: Left-back

Team information
- Current team: Cobresal

Youth career
- Colo-Colo
- Deportes Valdivia

Senior career*
Years	Team	Apps	(Gls)
2017–2019	Deportes Valdivia	33	(1)
2021	→ Deportes Rengo (loan)	–	(–)
2019–2025	Huachipato	96	(2)
2026–	Cobresal	0	(0)
- * Club domestic league appearances and goals as of 23 December 2025

Antonio Andrés Castillo Navarrete (born 15 November 1998) is a Chilean footballer who plays as an left-back for Chilean Primera División club Cobresal.

== Club career ==
Born in Futrono, Chile, Castillo was with Colo-Colo before joining the Deportes Valdivia youth ranks. He made his senior debut in the 2018 Primera B de Chile. In 2021, he had a stint on loan with Deportes Rengo.

On 24 June 2019, Castillo signed with Huachipato in the Chilean Primera División. They won the 2023 league title.

In December 2025, Castillo joined Cobresal.

== International career ==
Castillo was called up to the Chile U23 squad for the friendly against Brazil on 9 September 2019, but he didn't enter in the match.

== Honours ==
Huachipato

- Chilean Primera División: 2023
- Copa Chile: 2025
