= Gustavo Huerta =

Chilean footballer and manager (born 1957)

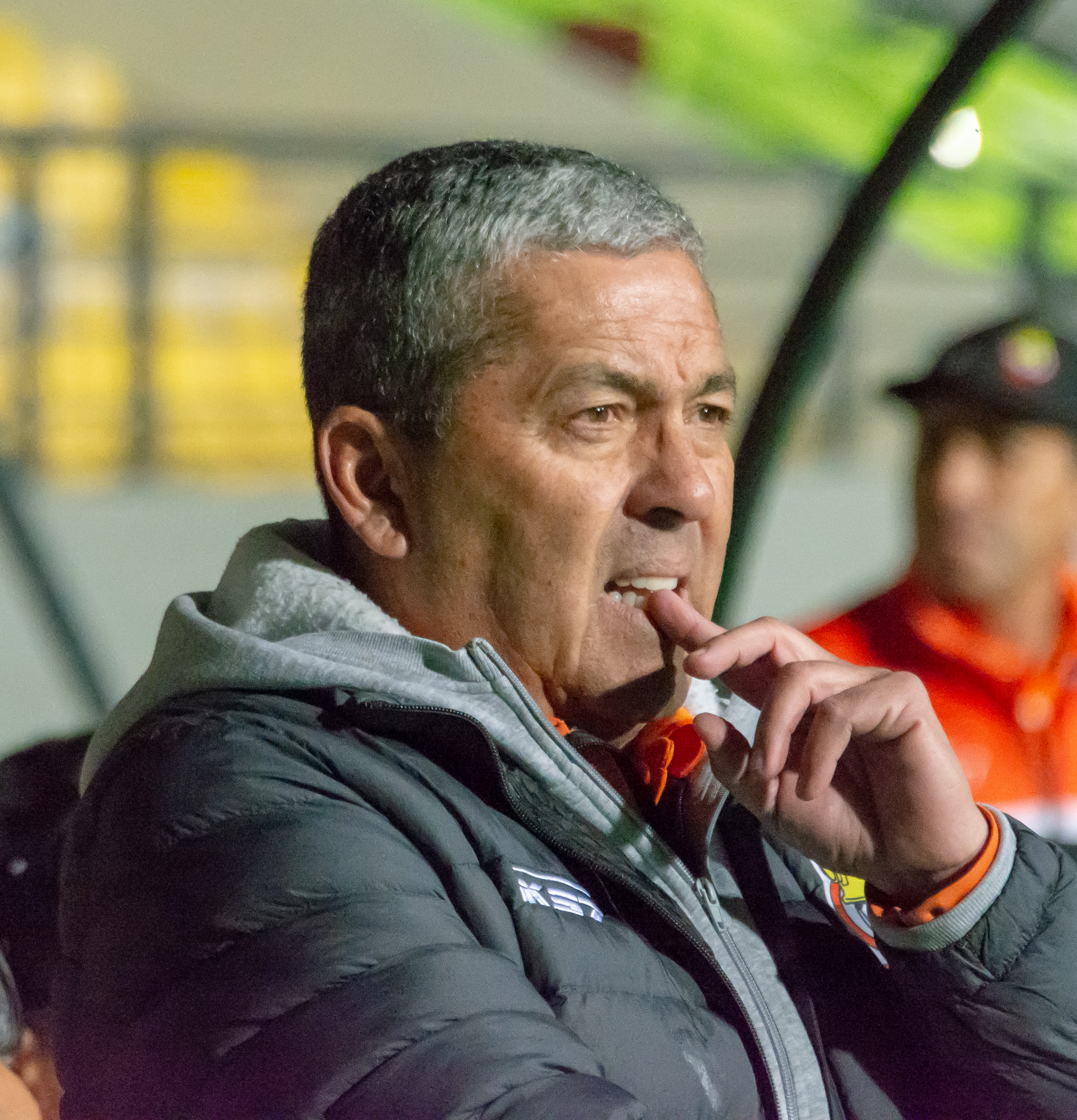

Personal information
- Full name: Gustavo Ernesto Huerta Araya
- Date of birth: 15 October 1957 (age 69)
- Place of birth: Ovalle, Chile
- Height: 1.76 m (5 ft 9 1/2 in)
- Position: Midfielder

Team information
- Current team: Cobresal (Head coach)

Youth career
- Universidad de Chile

Senior career*
Years	Team	Apps	(Gls)
1976	Deportes Ovalle		
1977–1981	Ferroviarios		
1982	Deportes Antofagasta		
1983–1990	Cobresal	182	(0)

International career
1987	Chile	1	(0)

Managerial career
- 1991–1992: Cobresal
- 1993–1995: Deportes Ovalle
- 1996–1999: Deportes La Serena
- 1997–1998: Chile (assistant)
- 1998: Chile B
- 2002: Deportes Melipilla
- 2003: Cobresal
- 2003: Bolívar
- 2004–2005: Cobresal
- 2006: Universidad de Chile
- 2007: Cobreloa
- 2008: Santiago Wanderers
- 2009: Coquimbo Unido
- 2009–2010: Deportes Iquique
- 2011–2014: Deportes Antofagasta
- 2015–2016: Deportes Santa Cruz
- 2017–: Cobresal
- * Club domestic league appearances and goals

Gustavo Ernesto Huerta Araya (born 15 October 1957) is a Chilean former footballer and manager. He is currently the head coach of Cobresal.

== Managerial career ==
Before the 1998 FIFA World Cup, Huerta was the assistant of the Head Coach of Chile, Nelson Acosta. He managed Chile B in a friendly match against England B on February 10, 1998. Chile won by 2–1.

== Personal life ==
Both his father, Gustavo Sr., and his younger brothers, Fernando and Carlos, were professional footballers. All of them played for Deportes Ovalle among other clubs. Also, his son Gustavo is a sport journalist who has worked for Televisión Nacional de Chile and ESPN Chile.

== Honours ==
=== Player ===
Cobresal

- Copa Chile: 1987

== See also ==
- List of football managers with the most matches
