= Diego Díaz (footballer, born 1986) =

Chilean footballer

Personal information
- Full name: Diego Armando Díaz Ahumada
- Date of birth: 12 June 1986 (age 40)
- Place of birth: Curicó, Chile
- Height: 1.75 m (5 ft 9 in)
- Position: Centre-back

Youth career
- Colo-Colo

Senior career*
Years	Team	Apps	(Gls)
2006–2007	Curicó Unido	41	(1)
2008–2016	Universidad de Concepción	173	(3)
2016–2017	Deportes Temuco	41	(1)
2018–2019	Curicó Unido	27	(0)
2020	Deportes Santa Cruz	12	(0)
2021	Deportes Recoleta	0	(0)
Total		294	(5)
- * Club domestic league appearances and goals

Diego Armando Díaz Ahumada (born 12 June 1986), nicknamed Pescadito (Little Fish), is a Chilean former professional footballer.

== Career ==
In January 2021, he announced his retirement from playing football at professional level due to a knee injury.

== Honours ==
Universidad de Concepción

- Copa Chile (2): 2008–09, 2014–15
- Primera B (1): 2013 Transición
