= Christian Mauvezin =

Uruguayan footballer (born 1984)

Personal information
- Full name: Christian Mauvezin Perna
- Date of birth: 31 March 1984 (age 42)
- Place of birth: Montevideo, Uruguay
- Height: 1.68 m (5 ft 6 in)
- Position: Midfielder

Senior career*
| Years | Team | Apps | (Gls) |
| 2000–2004 | Rentistas | 17 | (0) |
| 2005 | Cobresal | 12 | (1) |
| 2006–2009 | Villa Española | 23 | (1) |
| 2010 | Basáñez | | |
- * Club domestic league appearances and goals

Christian Mauvezin Perna (born 31 March 1984) is a former Uruguayan footballer who played as a midfielder.

== Teams ==
- (Uruguay) Rentistas 2000–2005
- (Chile) Cobresal 2005
- (Uruguay) Villa Española 2006–2009
- (Uruguay) Basáñez 2010
