= Pablo Brito =

Chilean footballer

Personal information
- Full name: Pablo Brian Brito Oyarzún
- Date of birth: 29 May 1998 (age 28)
- Place of birth: San José de Maipo, Chile
- Height: 1.80 m (5 ft 11 in)
- Position: Left winger

Team information
- Current team: Deportes Santa Cruz

Youth career
- Colo-Colo
- Universidad de Chile
- Cobreloa

Senior career*
Years	Team	Apps	(Gls)
2017–2021	Cobreloa	32	(2)
2019	→ Deportes Limache (loan)	–	(–)
2022	Deportes Santa Cruz	29	(1)
2023	Santiago Morning	17	(0)
2024	Trasandino	23	(1)
2025	Cajón del Maipo	–	(–)
2025	Penya Encarnada	11	(1)
2026	Atlètic d'Escaldes	10	(1)
2026–	Deportes Santa Cruz	0	(0)
- * Club domestic league appearances and goals as of 1 June 2026

Pablo Brian Brito Oyarzún (born 29 May 1998) is a Chilean professional footballer who plays as a left winger for Deportes Santa Cruz.

== Club career ==
Brito was with Chilean giants Colo-Colo and Universidad de Chile before joining the Cobreloa youth ranks. He made his professional debut with Cobreloa and was with them until the 2021 season, with a brief loan to Deportes Limache in 2019.

The following years, Brito played for Deportes Santa Cruz, Santiago Morning, Trasandino de Los Andes and Cajón del Maipo in his homeland.

In the second half of 2025, Brito moved to Europe and joined Andorran club Penya Encarnada in the Primera Divisió. The next year, he switched to Atlètic d'Escaldes, winning the 2026 Copa Constitució and qualifying to the 2026–27 UEFA Conference League.

Back to Chile, Brito joined Deportes Santa Cruz on 6 August 2026.

== Honours ==
Atlètic d'Escaldes

- Copa Constitució: 2026
