= Francisco Delorenzi =

Argentine footballer (born 1998)

Personal information
- Full name: Francisco Manuel Delorenzi
- Date of birth: 3 January 1998 (age 28)
- Place of birth: Luján, Argentina
- Height: 1.82 m (6 ft 0 in)
- Position: Centre-back

Team information
- Current team: Patacona

Youth career
- Jorge Newbery Luján
- Flandria
- 2012–2019: Independiente

Senior career*
Years	Team	Apps	(Gls)
2019–2020	Independiente	0	(0)
2019–2020	→ Deportivo Cali (loan)	18	(0)
2020–2021	Salamanca	6	(0)
2021	Ierapetra	8	(0)
2022	Almagro	10	(0)
2023	Talavera	1	(0)
2023–2024	Acero	29	(3)
2024–	Patacona	1	(0)
- * Club domestic league appearances and goals as of 7 September 2024

Francisco Manuel Delorenzi (born 3 January 1998) is an Argentine professional footballer who plays as a centre-back for Spanish club Patacona.

== Career ==
Delorenzi, after coming through the youth ranks of Jorge Newbery Luján and Flandria, joined Independiente's ranks in 2012. In January 2019, Delorenzi departed on loan to join Categoría Primera A's Deportivo Cali. He made his bow in senior football on 7 March during a 0–3 win against Patriotas, he had previously been an unused substitute for fixtures with Deportes Tolima, Unión Magdalena and Independiente Medellín. In the succeeding May, Delorenzi appeared in continental competition for the first time after featuring in matches with Guaraní and Peñarol in the Copa Sudamericana.

On 29 July 2020, it was announced that Delorenzi had joined Salamanca but a day later all articles relating to the transfer on the club's official site were removed. He was eventually unveiled again on 7 September.

== Career statistics ==
As of 16 December 2020.

Appearances and goals by club, season and competition
Club	Season	League			Cup		League Cup		Continental		Other		Total	
Club	Season	Division	Apps	Goals	Apps	Goals	Apps	Goals	Apps	Goals	Apps	Goals	Apps	Goals
Independiente	2018–19	Primera División	0	0	0	0	0	0	0	0	0	0	0	0
Independiente	2019–20	Primera División	0	0	0	0	0	0	0	0	0	0	0	0
Independiente	Total		0	0	0	0	0	0	0	0	0	0	0	0
Deportivo Cali (loan)	2019	Categoría Primera A	18	0	3	0	—		2 (Note: Appearance(s) in the Copa Sudamericana)	0	5 (Note: Appearance(s) in the Categoría Primera A play-offs)	0	28	0
Salamanca	2020–21	Segunda División B	6	0	0	0	0	0	0	0	0	0	6	0
Career total			24	0	3	0	0	0	2	0	5	0	34	0
