= Mauro Aguirre =

Argentine footballer (born 1990)

Personal information
- Full name: Mauro Nicolás Aguirre Miño
- Date of birth: 21 April 1990 (age 36)
- Place of birth: San Luis, Argentina
- Height: 1.80 m (5 ft 11 in)
- Positions: Left wing-back; left midfielder

Youth career
- Sportivo Estudiantes
- Juventud Unida SL

Senior career*
Years	Team	Apps	(Gls)
2010–2016	Juventud Unida SL	101	(12)
2016	Iberia	15	(0)
2016–2017	Coquimbo Unido	28	(2)
2017	DEPRO	–	(–)
2017	Iberia	15	(0)
2018	Deportes Santa Cruz	25	(0)
2019	Magallanes	18	(1)
2020–2021	Deportes Santa Cruz	22	(0)
2022	Deportes Santa Cruz	16	(0)
- * Club domestic league appearances and goals as of 21 April 2024

Mauro Nicolás Aguirre Miño (born 21 April 1990) is an Argentine footballer who plays as a left wing-back. He last played for Deportes Santa Cruz in the Primera B de Chile.

== Career ==
Born in San Luis, Argentina, Aguirre started his career with Juventud Unida Universitario from his city of birth.

In 2016, he moved to Chile and joined Iberia. In the second half of the same year, he switched to Coquimbo Unido.

After a brief stint with Defensores de Pronunciamiento (DEPRO), he returned to Iberia in 2017. The next year, he signed with Deportes Santa Cruz. In 2019, he played for Magallanes.

In 2020, Aguirre rejoined Deportes Santa Cruz. After leaving them in January 2021, he joined them by third time in 2022.
