= My Heart Is a Drunken Compass =

2014 book by Domingo Martinez

- First edition
- Author: Domingo Martinez
- Language: English
- Genre: Memoir
- Publisher: Lyons Press
- Publication date: November 18, 2014
- Publication place: United States
- Pages: 296

My Heart Is a Drunken Compass is a 2014 memoir by Domingo Martinez. Martinez's motivation for writing this memoir was to use writing as a therapeutic outlet to cope with his feelings following accidents involving his brother and ex-fiancée.
