= César González (Chilean footballer) =

Chilean footballer (born 1997)

Personal information
- Full name: César Alejandro González Ramírez
- Date of birth: 11 January 1997 (age 29)
- Place of birth: Champa, Paine, Chile
- Height: 1.76 m (5 ft 9 in)
- Position: Forward

Team information
- Current team: Deportes Iquique
- Number: 17

Youth career
- 2007–2014: O'Higgins

Senior career*
Years	Team	Apps	(Gls)
2014–2019	O'Higgins	3	(0)
2015–2016	→ Deportes Santa Cruz (loan)	32	(6)
2016–2017	→ Magallanes (loan)	21	(0)
2018	→ Magallanes (loan)	14	(0)
2019	→ Deportes Santa Cruz (loan)	23	(1)
2020–2021	Magallanes	19	(0)
2021	Deportes Santa Cruz	27	(2)
2022–	Deportes Iquique	105	(11)
- * Club domestic league appearances and goals as of 31 December 2025

César Alejandro González Ramírez (born 11 January 1997) is a Chilean footballer who plays as a forward for Deportes Iquique.

== Career ==
González started his career at Primera División de Chile club O'Higgins. He progressed from the under categories club all the way to the senior team.

On 1 February 2015, Cubillos debuted against Huachipato replacing Damián Lizio at the 75' on the 3–0 win at the Estadio El Teniente.

In 2022, González signed with Deportes Iquique.

== Career statistics ==
=== Club ===
As of 16 January 2015

Club	Season	League			Copa Chile		Supercopa		Continental		Total	
Club	Season	Division	Apps	Goals	Apps	Goals	Apps	Goals	Apps	Goals	Apps	Goals
O'Higgins	2014–15	Primera División	1	0	0	0	—				1	0
Career total			1	0	0	0	0	0	0	0	1	0
