= Felipe Villagrán =

Chilean footballer (born 1997)

Personal information
- Full name: Felipe Andrés Villagrán Rivera
- Date of birth: 17 March 1997 (age 29)
- Place of birth: Santiago, Chile
- Position: Midfielder

Team information
- Current team: Cobresal

Youth career
- Universidad de Chile
- 2015–2016: Alcanenense

Senior career*
Years	Team	Apps	(Gls)
2016–2017	Varzim B	6	(1)
2016–2017	Varzim	24	(1)
2017–2019	Braga B	10	(0)
2020–2022	Coquimbo Unido	36	(1)
2021	→ Curicó Unido (loan)	13	(2)
2023	Cobreloa	23	(3)
2024–2026	Everton	22	(0)
2025	→ Deportes Temuco (loan)	9	(0)
2026–	Cobresal	0	(0)
- * Club domestic league appearances and goals as of 6 July 2026

Felipe Andrés Villagrán Rivera (born 17 March 1997) is a Chilean footballer who plays as a midfielder for Cobresal.

== Career ==
Villagrán started his career at Primera División de Chile club Club Universidad de Chile. In the summer of 2015, he moved to Portugal signing a deal with Alcanenense.

On 1 June 2016, Villagrán signed a one-year deal with Varzim S.C. He made his professional debut on 6 August 2016, coming on as a substitute in a 1–0 away loss with Gil Vicente F.C., a week later, on 13 August he scored his first goal in a 2–0 win over S.L. Benfica B.

After playing for Coquimbo Unido, Villagrán signed with Cobreloa for the 2023 season. For the 2024 season, he switched to Everton. In July 2025, he was loaned out to Deportes Temuco.

In July 2026, Villagrán switched to Cobresal from Everton de Viña del Mar.
