= Alan Soñora =

American soccer player

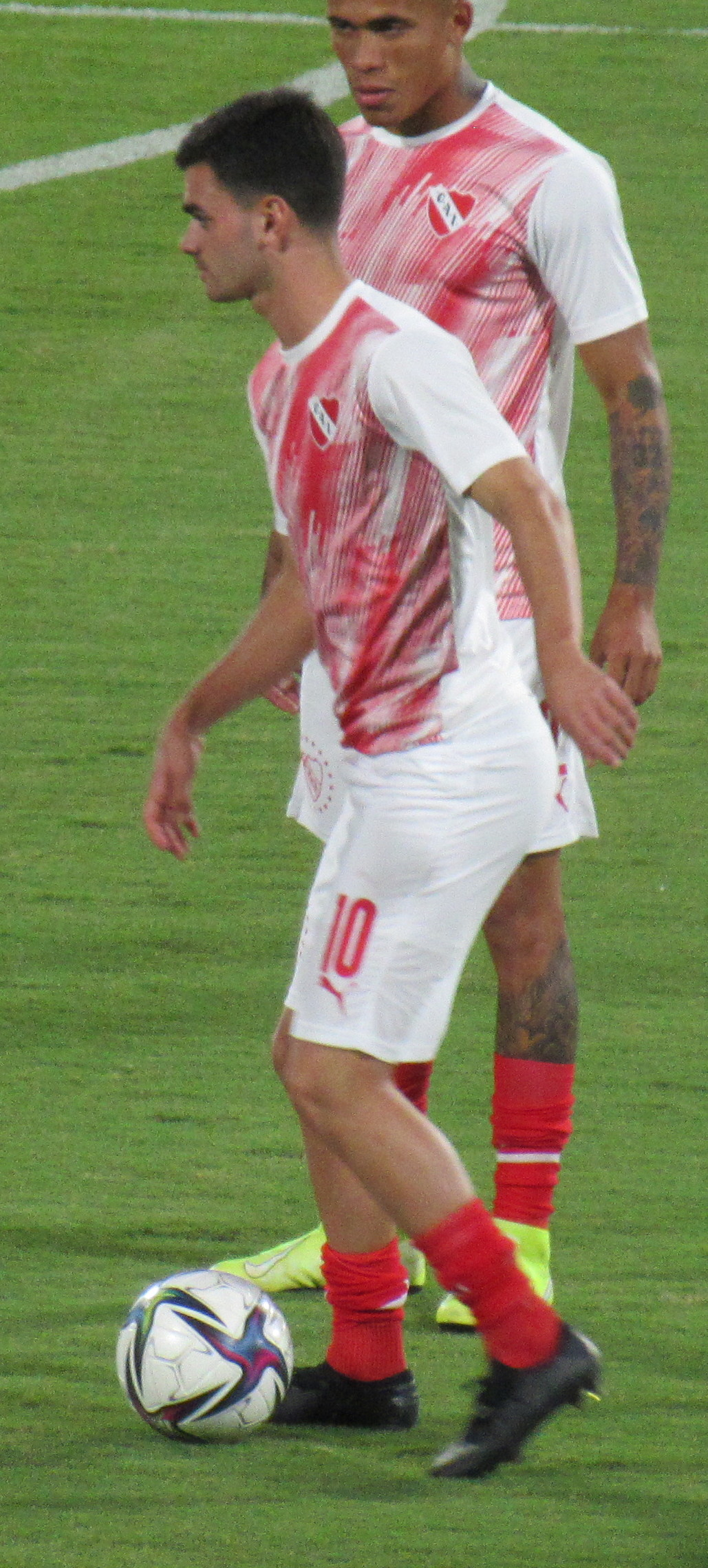
- Soñora with Independiente in 2022

Personal information
- Full name: Alan Soñora
- Date of birth: August 3, 1998 (age 28)
- Place of birth: New Jersey, United States
- Height: 5 ft 7 in (1.71 m)
- Position: Midfielder

Team information
- Current team: Newell's Old Boys
- Number: 15

Youth career
- 2012–2018: Boca Juniors
- 2018–2020: Independiente

Senior career*
| Years | Team | Apps | (Gls) |
| 2019–2022 | Independiente | 67 | (9) |
| 2023 | Juárez | 8 | (0) |
| 2023–2024 | Huracán | 24 | (2) |
| 2025–2026 | Cerro Porteño | 13 | (1) |
| 2026– | Newell's Old Boys | 0 | (0) |

International career^{‡}
| 2023 | United States | 5 | (0) |
- * Club domestic league appearances and goals as of 16:41, 26 July 2026 (UTC) ‡ National team caps and goals as of June 28, 2023

Alan Soñora (born August 3, 1998) is an American professional soccer player who plays as a midfielder for Argentine Primera División club Newell's Old Boys.

== Club career ==
Born in the United States, Soñora played for Boca Juniors and Independiente at youth level. He was moved into Independiente's senior set-up in 2019–20, with manager Sebastián Beccacece selecting him on the bench five times across the Primera División and Copa Sudamericana in the early months of the campaign. Soñora's professional debut arrived on September 26, 2019, as he came off the substitutes bench to replace Silvio Romero after sixty-six minutes of a Copa Argentina victory over Defensa y Justicia.

Soñora joined Mexican club FC Juárez in February 2023, joining his brother Joel Soñora on the squad. After only eight appearances he left the club by mutual consent in July.

== International career ==
Soñora is eligible for Argentina and the United States at international level, and has expressed an interest in appearing for the latter alongside his brother Joel.

He made his international debut for the United States in a 2-1 friendly loss to Serbia on January 25, 2023. Soñora was named to the United States' 23-man roster for the 2023 Gold Cup. He started in a group stage match against Jamaica, and came on in substitution against Saint Kitts & Nevis.

== Personal life ==
Soñora's brother, Joel, is also a professional soccer player. They are the sons of Diego Soñora, who was playing in Major League Soccer at the time of their respective births.

== Career statistics ==
=== Club ===
As of February 23, 2025

Appearances and goals by club, season and competition
| Club | Season | League | | | National cup (Note: Includes Copa Argentina) | | Continental | | Other | | Total | |
| Club | Season | Division | Apps | Goals | Apps | Goals | Apps | Goals | Apps | Goals | Apps | Goals |
|---|---|---|---|---|---|---|---|---|---|---|---|---|
| Independiente | 2019–20 | Argentine Primera División | 2 | 0 | 1 | 0 | 6 (Note: Appearance(s) in Copa Sudamericana) | 0 | — | | 19 | 1 |
| Independiente | 2021 | Argentine Primera División | 31 | 5 | 1 | 0 | 4 | 0 | — | | 26 | 4 |
| Independiente | 2022 | Argentine Primera División | 34 | 4 | 2 | 0 | 6 | 2 | — | | 42 | 6 |
| Independiente | Total | | 67 | 9 | 4 | 0 | 16 | 2 | — | | 87 | 11 |
| Juárez | 2022–23 | Liga MX | 8 | 0 | — | | — | | — | | 8 | 0 |
| Huracán | 2023 | Argentine Primera División | 10 | 1 | 2 | 0 | — | | — | | 12 | 1 |
| Huracán | 2024 | Argentine Primera División | 14 | 1 | 4 | 0 | — | | — | | 18 | 1 |
| Huracán | Total | | 24 | 2 | 6 | 0 | — | | — | | 30 | 2 |
| Cerro Porteño | 2025 | Paraguayan Primera División | 5 | 0 | — | | 1 (Note: Appearance in Copa Libertadores) | 0 | — | | 6 | 0 |
| Career total | | | 104 | 11 | 10 | 0 | 17 | 2 | 0 | 0 | 131 | 13 |

=== International ===
As of match played June 28, 2023

Appearances and goals by national team and year
| National team | Year | Apps | Goals |
|---|---|---|---|
| United States | 2023 | 5 | 0 |
| Total | | 5 | 0 |

== Honors ==
United States

- CONCACAF Nations League: 2022–23
