= Franco Shea =

Argentine professional footballer

Personal information
- Full name: Franco David Shea
- Date of birth: 28 November 1997 (age 28)
- Place of birth: Rosario, Argentina
- Height: 1.84 m (6 ft 0 in)
- Position: Forward

Team information
- Current team: Nestos Chrysoupoli
- Number: 97

Youth career
- Independiente

Senior career*
Years	Team	Apps	(Gls)
2018–2019	Independiente	0	(0)
2018	→ Colegiales (loan)	3	(0)
2019	→ Ferrocarril Midland (loan)	1	(0)
2019–2020	Paleochora		
2021–2022	AEP Kozani		
2022	San Benito		
2022–2023	AEP Kozani		
2023–2024	Nestos Chrysoupoli		
2025	Ilioupoli	9	(0)
2025	Zakynthos		
2026–	Nestos Chrysoupoli	12	(3)
- * Club domestic league appearances and goals as of 22 April 2026

Franco David Shea (born 28 November 1997) is an Argentine professional footballer who plays as a forward for the Super League Greece 2 club Nestos Chrysoupoli.

== Career ==
Shea is a graduate of Independiente. In June 2018, Shea agreed a loan move to Primera B Metropolitana side Colegiales. His professional football debut came in a defeat away from home to UAI Urquiza on 29 August, which preceded further appearances in goalless draws with Justo José de Urquiza and Deportivo Riestra in 2018–19; though he'd return to his parent Primera División team Independiente mid-season. Shea was immediately loaned back out, as he joined Ferrocarril Midland in Primera C Metropolitana. He remained for six months in tier four, but only appeared twice in competitive action.

On 3 August 2019, Shea switched Argentina for Greece after agreeing terms with Chania regional league side Paleochora. He renewed his contract twelve months later, following the club's promotion to the Gamma Ethniki. In April 2021, Shea joined fellow country club AEP Kozani.

== Career statistics ==
As of 18 June 2019.

Appearances and goals by club, season and competition
Club	Season	League			Cup		League Cup		Continental		Other		Total	
Club	Season	Division	Apps	Goals	Apps	Goals	Apps	Goals	Apps	Goals	Apps	Goals	Apps	Goals
Independiente	2018–19	Primera División	0	0	0	0	0	0	0	0	0	0	0	0
Independiente	2019–20	Primera División	0	0	0	0	0	0	0	0	0	0	0	0
Independiente	Total		0	0	0	0	0	0	0	0	0	0	0	0
Colegiales (loan)	2018–19	Primera B Metropolitana	3	0	0	0	—		—		0	0	3	0
Ferrocarril Midland (loan)	2018–19	Primera C Metropolitana	1	0	1	0	—		—		0	0	2	0
Career total			4	0	1	0	0	0	0	0	0	0	5	0
