= Diego Acevedo =

Chilean footballer

Personal information
- Full name: Diego Antonio Acevedo Godoy
- Date of birth: 23 February 2001 (age 25)
- Place of birth: Chillán, Chile
- Height: 1.72 m (5 ft 8 in)
- Position: Midfielder

Team information
- Current team: Deportes Santa Cruz
- Number: 8

Youth career
- 2011–2020: Unión Española

Senior career*
Years	Team	Apps	(Gls)
2021–2023	Unión Española	30	(2)
2025	Cobreloa	15	(1)
2026–	Deportes Santa Cruz	0	(0)
- * Club domestic league appearances and goals as of 1 February 2026

Diego Antonio Acevedo Godoy (born 23 February 2001) is a Chilean footballer who plays as a midfielder for Deportes Santa Cruz.

== Club career ==
Born in Chillán, Chile, Acevedo is a product of Unión Española and signed his first professional contract on 2 February 2021. He made his debut in the 4–1 away loss against Huachipato on 19 January 2021 for the 2020 Chilean Primera División. and took part in the 2022 Copa Sudamericana. He ended his contract in December 2023.

On 30 December 2024, Acevedo signed with Cobreloa for the 2025 season.

In January 2026, Acevedo joined Deportes Santa Cruz.

== International career ==
During 2022, Acevedo took part in training microcycles of the Chile national team at under-23 level.
