= Cristóbal Castillo =

Chilean footballer (born 2003)

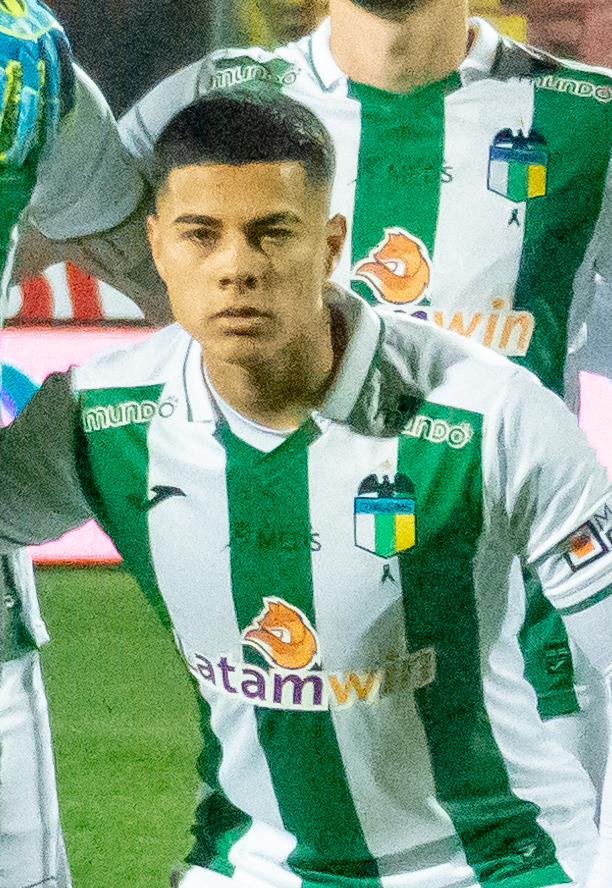
- Castillo with O'Higgins in 2023

Personal information
- Full name: Cristóbal Alonso Castillo Espinaza
- Date of birth: 4 February 2003 (age 23)
- Place of birth: Machalí, Chile
- Height: 1.78 m (5 ft 10 in)
- Position: Midfielder

Team information
- Current team: Deportes Santa Cruz

Youth career
- 2013–2021: O'Higgins

Senior career*
Years	Team	Apps	(Gls)
2021–2026	O'Higgins	42	(0)
2025	→ Deportes Santa Cruz (loan)	24	(0)
2026–	Deportes Santa Cruz	0	(0)

International career^{‡}
2021–2023	Chile U20	18	(0)
- * Club domestic league appearances and goals as of 2 July 2026 ‡ National team caps and goals as of 20 February 2023

Cristóbal Alonso Castillo Espinaza (born 4 February 2003) is a Chilean professional footballer who plays as a midfielder for Deportes Santa Cruz.

== Club career ==
Born in Machalí, Castillo came to O'Higgins at the age of 10. He became the team captain of the under-13 level, winning the 2016 Youth Football National Championship. He made his professional debut in the 2021 Primera División match against Everton de Viña del Mar on 27 March. In 2025, he was loaned out to Deportes Santa Cruz. He left them in June 2026.

In July 2026, Castillo rejoined Deportes Santa Cruz.

== International career ==
Castillo represented Chile U20 at the friendly tournament Copa Rául Coloma Rivas, playing all the matches, and at three friendly matches against Paraguay U20 and Peru U20 on 2022. In September 2022, he made three appearances in the Costa Cálida Supercup. In the 2022 South American Games, he made three appearances. In 2023, he made three appearances in the South American U20 Championship.
