= Ronnie Radonich =

Chilean football manager

Personal information
- Full name: Ronnie Finlay Radonich Morrison
- Date of birth: 14 February 1957 (age 69)
- Place of birth: Magallanes, Chile

Senior career*
Years	Team	Apps	(Gls)
1981–1984	Universidad Católica	15	(0)
1985	Palestino	1	(0)
1986–1990	Deportes Temuco		

Managerial career
- –2001: Universidad Católica (youth)
- 2005–2008: Universidad Católica (youth)
- 2008: Chile U17 (women)
- 2010: Chile U17 (women)
- 2013–2014: Chile (women)
- 2017: Deportes Santa Cruz (sporting director)
- 2017: Deportes Santa Cruz
- 2018–2022: Universidad Católica U17 (women)
- 2018–2022: Universidad Católica (women)
- * Club domestic league appearances and goals

Ronnie Finlay Radonich Morrison (born 14 February 1957) is a Chilean football manager and former footballer.

== Playing career ==
Born in Magallanes Region, Chile, Radonich played for Universidad Católica and Palestino in the Chilean Primera División. With Universidad Católica, he won the 1984 league title. He also played for Deportes Temuco in the Chilean Segunda División and retired in 1992.

== Managerial career ==
As a football coach, Radonich started working at the Universidad Católica youth ranks until 2001 and from 2005 to 2008.

In 2010, Radonich was appointed as the manager of the Chile women under-17 team and led them in the South American Championship, qualifying to the 2010 FIFA World Cup. Previously, he had led them in the 2008 South American Championship.

In 2013, Radonich assumed as the manager of the Chile women senior team and led them in the 2014 Copa América.

In June 2017, Radonich assumed as manager of Deportes Santa Cruz in the Segunda División Profesional de Chile.

From July 2018 to 2022, Radonich coached the Universidad Católica women's team at the same time the under 17's.

== Other works ==
A PE teacher, Radonich also has served as chief of women's football for ANFP, program director and teacher of National Institute of Football, Sport and Physical Activity (INAF), football instructor, among other activities.

== Personal life ==
Radonich is of Croatian descent.
