= Hardy Cavero =

Chilean footballer (born 1996)

Personal information
- Full name: Hardy Fabián Cavero Vargas
- Date of birth: 31 May 1996 (age 30)
- Place of birth: Puerto Montt, Chile
- Height: 1.81 m (5 ft 11 in)
- Position: Defender

Team information
- Current team: Deportes Santa Cruz
- Number: 5

Youth career
- Colo-Colo

Senior career*
Years	Team	Apps	(Gls)
2011–	Colo-Colo	3	(0)
2012–2013	Colo-Colo B	17	(0)
2016	→ San Marcos (loan)	13	(1)
2018	→ Deportes Antofagasta (loan)	1	(0)
2019	→ Barnechea (loan)	23	(0)
2020–2022	Universidad de Concepción	69	(1)
2023	Deportes Antofagasta	12	(0)
2024	San Luis	16	(0)
2025–	Deportes Santa Cruz	1	(0)

International career^{‡}
2013	Chile U20	0	(0)
- * Club domestic league appearances and goals as of 3 May 2025 ‡ National team caps and goals as of 21 November 2021

Hardy Fabián Cavero Vargas (born 31 May 1996) is a Chilean footballer who plays for Deportes Santa Cruz of the Primera B de Chile as a defender.

== Career ==
For the 2024 season, Cavero signed with San Luis de Quillota. The next season, he switched to Deportes Santa Cruz.

== Personal life ==
Cavero is of Mapuche descent.
