= Dalcio Giovagnoli =

Argentine football coach

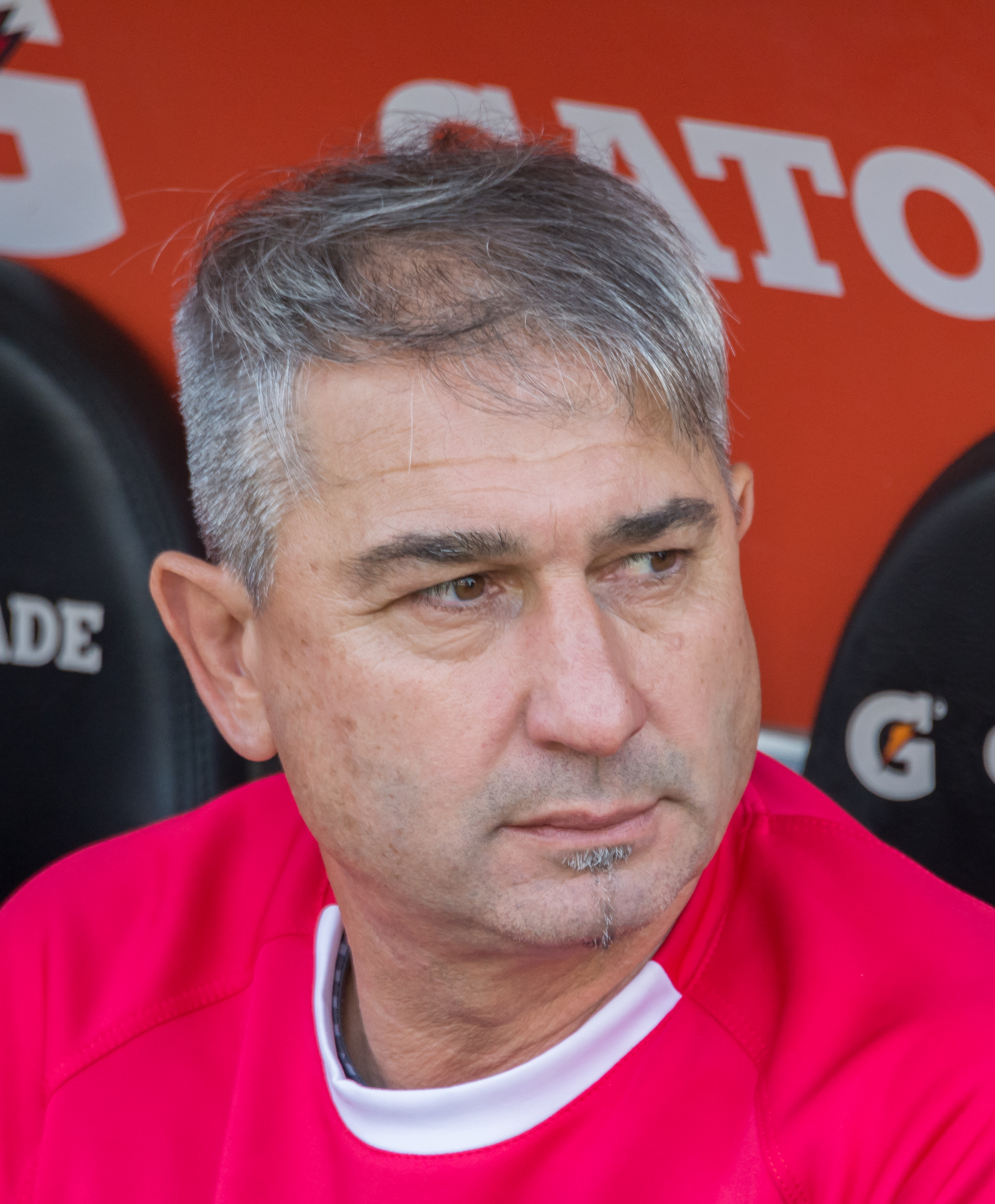
- Giovagnoli managing Curicó Unido in 2019

Personal information
- Full name: Dalcio Víctor Giovagnoli
- Date of birth: 5 June 1963 (age 63)
- Place of birth: Rosario, Argentina
- Height: 1.82 m (6 ft 0 in)
- Position: Centre-back

Team information
- Current team: Deportes Santa Cruz (manager)

Youth career
- 1974–1983: Newell's Old Boys

Senior career*
Years	Team	Apps	(Gls)
1983–1989	Newell's Old Boys		
1990–1991	Instituto		
1992–1993	Nueva Chicago	16	(1)
1994	Central Córdoba		
Total		16	(1)

Managerial career
- 1996: Renato Cesarini
- 1997: Guabirá
- 1998: Wilstermann
- 1999: San Martín SJ
- 1999: Oriente Petrolero
- 2000: Central Córdoba
- 2001: Oriente Petrolero
- 2002: Deportivo Cuenca
- 2002–2003: Wilstermann
- 2003: Bolivia
- 2003–2004: San Martín Mendoza
- 2004–2006: C.A.I.
- 2006: Aldosivi
- 2007: Tiro Federal
- 2008: Chacarita Juniors
- 2009: Belgrano
- 2010: Ferro Carril Oeste
- 2010: Sol de América
- 2011: Real Potosí
- 2011–2012: Guillermo Brown
- 2012–2013: Rangers de Talca
- 2014: Sportivo Belgrano
- 2014–2015: Cobresal
- 2016–2017: Cobresal
- 2017–2018: Deportes Temuco
- 2019: Curicó Unido
- 2020–2021: O'Higgins
- 2022–2023: Rangers de Talca
- 2024: Cobreloa
- 2025: GV San José
- 2026–: Deportes Santa Cruz
- * Club domestic league appearances and goals

Dalcio Víctor Giovagnoli (born 5 June 1963) is an Argentine football manager and former player who played as a centre-back. He is the current manager of Deportes Santa Cruz.

== Career ==
In 2024, Giovagnoli led Chilean club Cobreloa until September. He returned to Chile to led Deportes Santa Cruz in May 2026.

== Honours ==
=== Manager ===
Jorge Wilstermann

- Primera División de Bolivia (1): 1998 Apertura, Runner–up 1998 Clausura

Oriente Petrolero

- Primera División de Bolivia (1): 2001

San Martín de San Juan

- Primera B Nacional (1): Runner–up 2003 Apertura

C.A.I.

- Primera B Nacional (1): Runner–up 2006 Clausura

Cobresal

- Primera División de Chile (1): 2015 Clausura
