= Nadir Zeineddin =

Argentine footballer (born 2000)

Personal information
- Full name: Nadir Hassan Zeineddin
- Date of birth: 15 May 2000 (age 26)
- Place of birth: Vicente López, Argentina
- Height: 1.83 m (6 ft 0 in)
- Position: Striker

Team information
- Current team: Deportes Santa Cruz
- Number: 9

Youth career
- 2011–2014: Vélez Sarsfield
- 2014–2020: Platense

Senior career*
Years	Team	Apps	(Gls)
2020–2024	Platense	14	(0)
2022	→ Villa Dálmine (loan)	13	(0)
2024	Defensores de Belgrano	14	(1)
2025	Deportivo Merlo	34	(4)
2026–	Deportes Santa Cruz	4	(0)
- * Club domestic league appearances and goals as of 17:10, 21 November 2025 (UTC)

Nadir Hassan Zeineddin (born 15 May 2000) is an Argentine professional footballer who plays as a striker for Chilean club Deportes Santa Cruz.

== Career ==
=== Platense ===
Zeineddin joined Platense at the age of 14, having previously spent three years with Vélez Sarsfield. He was promoted to Platense's first-team squad during the 2020 season, with the striker signing his first professional contract on 13 November. Zeineddin made the substitute's bench for a Primera Nacional match with Deportivo Morón on 5 December, with manager Juan Manuel Llop subsequently selecting him to come on with 33 minutes remaining of a 1–1 home draw; he replaced Daniel Vega. He made his first start on 11 December away to Estudiantes, which preceded one further appearance in a campaign that ended with promotion.

His Liga Profesional debut arrived on 6 March 2021 at the Estadio Malvinas Argentinas against Godoy Cruz, as he started and played 81 minutes of a 3–1 defeat.

==== Villa Dalmine (loan) ====
On 9 June 2022, Zeineddin was loaned out to Villa Dálmine until 31 December 2023, ahead of the second half of the 2022 Primera Nacional season.

=== Defensores de Belgrano ===
On 27 June 2024, Zeineddin signed for in the 2024 Primera Nacional.

=== Deportivo Merlo ===
On 7 January 2025, Zeineddin joined Primera B Metropolitana club Deportivo Merlo for the 2025 season.

=== Deportes Santa Cruz ===
In January 2026, Zeineddin moved abroad and signed with Chilean club Deportes Santa Cruz in the Campeonato Nacional Primera B.

== Personal life ==
Zeineddin is of Lebanese descent. He is affectionately nicknamed "El Turco", a reference to his family origins.

== Career statistics ==
As of match played 16 November 2025

Appearances and goals by club, season and competition
Club	Season	League			Copa Argentina		Copa LFP		Total	
Club	Season	Division	Apps	Goals	Apps	Goals	Apps	Goals	Apps	Goals
Platense	2020	Primera Nacional	3	0	—		—		3	0
Platense	2021	Liga Profesional	2	0	—		6	0	8	0
Platense	2022	Liga Profesional	—		—		11	3	11	3
Platense	2023	Liga Profesional	9	0	0	0	4	0	13	0
Platense	Total		14	0	0	0	21	3	35	3
Villa Dálmine (loan)	2022	Primera Nacional	13	0	—		—		13	0
Defensores de Belgrano	2024	Primera Nacional	14	1	—		—		14	1
Deportivo Merlo	2025	Primera B Metropolitana	34	4	—		—		34	4
Career total			75	5	0	0	21	3	96	8
