= Gonzalo Asis =

Argentine footballer (born 1996)

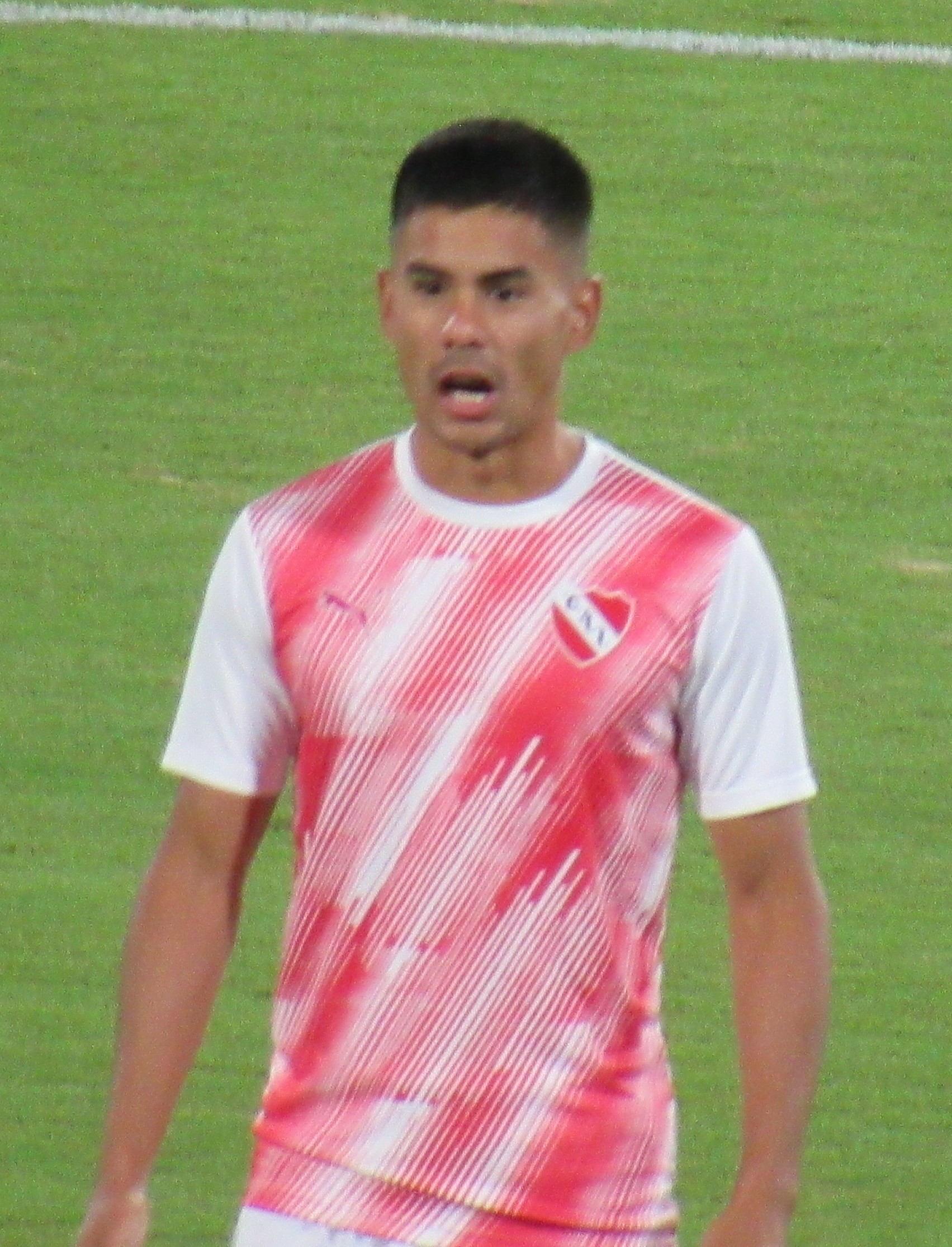

Personal information
- Date of birth: 28 March 1996 (age 30)
- Place of birth: Lomas de Zamora, Argentina
- Height: 1.74 m (5 ft 9 in)
- Position: Right-back

Team information
- Current team: Almagro

Youth career
- 2009–2017: Independiente

Senior career*
Years	Team	Apps	(Gls)
2017–2023	Independiente	24	(0)
2019–2020	→ Temperley (loan)	19	(0)
2023–2024	Platense	6	(0)
2024–2026	Patronato	50	(1)
2026–	Almagro	7	(0)
- * Club domestic league appearances and goals as of 16:43, 22 April 2026 (UTC)

Gonzalo Asis (born 28 March 1996) is an Argentine professional footballer who plays as a right-back for Almagro.

== Career ==
Asis was promoted into the first-team of Primera División side Independiente in 2017. He was an unused substitute for both legs of a 2017 Copa Sudamericana second stage victory against Deportes Iquique, prior to making his professional debut on 25 November in a league win away to Racing Club. After five total appearances for Independiente, Asis spent the 2019–20 campaign out on loan in Primera B Nacional with Temperley. Nineteen appearances followed.

== Career statistics ==
As of 1 September 2020.

Club statistics
Club	Season	League			Cup		League Cup		Continental		Other		Total	
Club	Season	Division	Apps	Goals	Apps	Goals	Apps	Goals	Apps	Goals	Apps	Goals	Apps	Goals
Independiente	2016–17	Primera División	0	0	0	0	—		0	0	0	0	0	0
Independiente	2017–18	Primera División	3	0	0	0	—		0	0	0	0	3	0
Independiente	2018–19	Primera División	2	0	0	0	0	0	0	0	0	0	2	0
Independiente	2019–20	Primera División	0	0	0	0	0	0	0	0	0	0	0	0
Independiente	Total		5	0	0	0	0	0	0	0	0	0	5	0
Temperley (loan)	2019–20	Primera B Nacional	19	0	0	0	—		—		0	0	19	0
Career total			24	0	0	0	0	0	0	0	0	0	24	0
