= Ítalo Díaz =

Chilean footballer (born 1971)

Personal information
- Full name: Ítalo Andrés Díaz Muñoz
- Date of birth: 21 June 1971 (age 55)
- Place of birth: Santiago, Chile
- Height: 1.71 m (5 ft 7 in)
- Position: Centre back

Senior career*
Years	Team	Apps	(Gls)
1994	Deportes Santa Cruz	32	(1)
1995–1998	Provincial Osorno	65	(3)
1999–2000	Audax Italiano	47	(2)
2001	Cobreloa	22	(0)
2002–2004	Coquimbo Unido	53	(2)
2004	Santiago Morning	14	(0)
2005	Magallanes	13	(0)
2005	Deportes Melipilla	18	(0)
2006	Curicó Unido	21	(0)

International career^{‡}
2001	Chile	2	(0)

Managerial career
- 2010: San Antonio Unido
- 2013–2014: Deportes Santa Cruz
- * Club domestic league appearances and goals as of 16 September 2014 ‡ National team caps and goals as of 16 September 2014

Ítalo Andrés Díaz Muñoz (Spanish pronunciation: [ˈitalo ˈðias], born 21 June 1971) is a Chilean former footballer and current manager. His last team coached was Deportes Santa Cruz.

His oldest son Paulo plays as centre back for Argentine Primera División club San Lorenzo. His younger son Nicolas plays for Palestino.
