= Juan Dobboletta =

Argentine professional footballer

Personal information
- Date of birth: 6 January 1993 (age 33)
- Place of birth: Carcarañá, Argentina
- Height: 1.85 m (6 ft 1 in)
- Position: Goalkeeper

Team information
- Current team: Deportes Santa Cruz
- Number: 36

Youth career
- Racing Club

Senior career*
Years	Team	Apps	(Gls)
2014–2015	Defensa y Justicia	0	(0)
2016	Juventud Unida Universitario	0	(0)
2016–2018	Defensores de Belgrano VR	18	(0)
2017–2018	→ Acassuso (loan)	34	(0)
2018–2019	Villa Dálmine	14	(0)
2020–2021	Acassuso	44	(0)
2022–2023	San Marcos	46	(0)
2024	Deportivo Riestra	0	(0)
2024–2025	Gimnasia de Jujuy	0	(0)
2025–	Deportes Santa Cruz	7	(0)
- * Club domestic league appearances and goals as of 3 May 2025

Juan Ignacio Dobboletta (born 6 January 1993) is an Argentine professional footballer who plays as a goalkeeper for Chilean club Deportes Santa Cruz.

== Career ==
Dobboletta started out in the youth ranks of Racing Club. Defensa y Justicia signed Dobboletta on 30 June 2014. He remained for the 2014 and 2015 seasons in the Primera División, but didn't make an appearance for the club; though was on the substitutes bench six times. In January 2016, Dobboletta completed a move to Juventud Unida Universitario. Like with his former team, the goalkeeper didn't play for the San Luis outfit; only appearing as a sub once, versus Atlético Paraná on 12 June. Later that month, on 30 June, Dobboletta joined Defensores de Belgrano. Twenty-seven total appearances followed.

On 2 August 2017, Dobboletta swapped Torneo Federal A for fellow third tier league Primera B Metropolitana by agreeing a loan deal with Acassuso. He participated thirty-five times in 2017–18, including for his debut against Barracas Central on 2 September, as they were eliminated from the promotion play-offs by UAI Urquiza. June 2018 saw Dobboletta join Villa Dálmine of Primera B Nacional.

In 2025, Dobboletta returned to Chile after his stint with San Marcos de Arica in 2022–2023 and joined Deportes Santa Cruz.

== Career statistics ==
As of 30 March 2019.

Appearances and goals by club, season and competition
Club	Season	League			Cup		Continental		Other		Total	
Club	Season	Division	Apps	Goals	Apps	Goals	Apps	Goals	Apps	Goals	Apps	Goals
Defensa y Justicia	2014	Primera División	0	0	0	0	—		0	0	0	0
Defensa y Justicia	2015	Primera División	0	0	0	0	—		0	0	0	0
Defensa y Justicia	Total		0	0	0	0	—		0	0	0	0
Juventud Unida Universitario	2016	Primera B Nacional	0	0	0	0	—		0	0	0	0
Defensores de Belgrano	2016–17	Torneo Federal A	18	0	3	0	—		6 (Note: Appearance(s) in the Torneo Federal A play-offs)	0	27	0
Defensores de Belgrano	2017–18	Torneo Federal A	0	0	0	0	—		0	0	0	0
Defensores de Belgrano	Total		18	0	3	0	—		6	0	27	0
Acassuso (loan)	2017–18	Primera B Metropolitana	34	0	0	0	—		1 (Note: Appearance(s) in the Primera B Metropolitana play-offs)	0	35	0
Villa Dálmine	2018–19	Primera B Nacional	13	0	3	0	—		0	0	16	0
Career total			65	0	6	0	—		7	0	78	0
