= Felipe Alvarado =

Chilean footballer

Personal information
- Full name: Felipe Andre Alvarado Inzunza
- Date of birth: 8 February 1999 (age 27)
- Place of birth: Valparaíso, Chile
- Height: 1.78 m (5 ft 10 in)
- Position: Left-back

Team information
- Current team: Deportes Santa Cruz

Youth career
- Santiago Wanderers

Senior career*
Years	Team	Apps	(Gls)
2018–2022	Santiago Wanderers	43	(1)
2020–2021	→ Deportes Colina (loan)	20	(0)
2023	Deportes Antofagasta	20	(1)
2024	Santiago Morning	13	(0)
2025	Deportes Recoleta	23	(1)
2026–	Deportes Santa Cruz	0	(0)

International career
- Chile U17
- * Club domestic league appearances and goals as of 26 December 2025

Felipe Andre Alvarado Inzunza (8 February 1999) is a Chilean footballer who plays as a left-back for Deportes Santa Cruz.

== Club career ==
A product of Santiago Wanderers, Alvarado made his professional debut in the 1–1 draw against Deportes La Serena on 21 April 2018 and signed his first professional contract on 25 May of the same year. The next year, they won the 2019 Primera B. In 2020, he was loaned out to Deportes Colina in the Segunda División Profesional de Chile. Back to Santiago Wanderers, he was a regular player during 2021 in the Chilean Primera División and 2022.

In January 2023, Alvarado joined Deportes Antofagasta. The next season, he switched to Santiago Morning.

In 2025, Alvarado signed with Deportes Recoleta. The next season, he switched to Deportes Santa Cruz.

== International career ==
Alvarado took part of training sessions of Chile at both under-17 and under-20 level in 2015 and 2017, respectively.
