= Mauro Siergiejuk =

Argentine footballer

Personal information
- Full name: Mauro Nicolás Siergiejuk
- Date of birth: 18 April 1997 (age 29)
- Place of birth: Leandro N. Alem, Misiones, Argentina
- Height: 1.86 m (6 ft 1 in)
- Position: Striker

Team information
- Current team: Sportivo Italiano
- Number: 18

Youth career
- Crucero del Norte

Senior career*
Years	Team	Apps	(Gls)
2016–2019	Crucero del Norte	39	(3)
2019–2020	DePro	21	(7)
2020–2021	Deportes Santa Cruz	10	(1)
2021	Sportivo Las Parejas	9	(0)
2021	Chaco For Ever	16	(2)
2022–2023	Douglas Haig	29	(4)
2024–	Sportivo Italiano	3	(0)
- * Club domestic league appearances and goals as of 22 April 2024

Mauro Nicolás Siergiejuk (born 18 April 1997) is an Argentine footballer who plays as a striker for Sportivo Italiano.

== Club career ==
Born in Leandro N. Alem, Misiones, Argentina, Siergiejuk started his career with Crucero del Norte in the Primera Nacional and made his debut in the 3–0 win against Estudiantes de San Luis on 5 March 2016, scoring a goal.

In the second half of 2019, he switched to Defensores de Pronunciamiento (DEPRO).

In October 2020, he moved abroad and signed with Chilean club Deportes Santa Cruz.

Back in Argentina, Siergiejuk played for Sportivo Las Parejas and Chaco For Ever during 2021. With Chaco For Ever, he got promotion to the 2022 Primera Nacional. The next two years, he played for Douglas Haig.

In 2024, he signed with Sportivo Italiano.
