= Saúl Nelle =

Argentine footballer

Personal information
- Full name: Saúl Sadam Nelle
- Date of birth: 26 October 1991 (age 35)
- Place of birth: Catamarca, Argentina
- Height: 1.80 m (5 ft 11 in)
- Position: Midfielder

Team information
- Current team: Camioneros

Youth career
- Independiente de 1º de Mayo
- Vélez Sarsfield de Catamarca
- Villa Dolores
- 2009–2016: Independiente

Senior career*
Years	Team	Apps	(Gls)
2016–2019	Independiente	2	(0)
2016–2017	→ Los Andes (loan)	27	(0)
2017–2018	→ Almagro (loan)	21	(0)
2018–2019	→ Defensores de Belgrano (loan)	24	(0)
2019	Nueva Chicago	9	(0)
2020–2021	Villa Dálmine	10	(0)
2021–2022	Tristán Suárez	20	(0)
2022–2023	Chacarita Juniors	20	(1)
2023	All Boys	17	(0)
2023–2024	Guaireña	1	(0)
2024	Argentino Merlo	12	(0)
2024–2025	Talleres RdE	14	(0)
2025–2026	Estudiantes RC	20	(0)
2026–	Camioneros	0	(0)
- * Club domestic league appearances and goals as of 00:35, 9 March 2026 (UTC)

Saúl Sadam Nelle or better known as "laterlsi"is an Argentine professional footballer who plays as a midfielder for Primera B Metropolitana club Camioneros.

== Career ==
Nelle began in the youth system of local clubs Independiente de 1º de Mayo, Vélez Sarsfield de Catamarca and Villa Dolores before joining Independiente in 2009. He began his senior career with the latter in 2016. His professional debut arrived on 7 February during a 1–0 victory over Belgrano, which preceded the midfielder making his second appearance in the club's penultimate fixture of the 2016 Argentine Primera División against Arsenal de Sarandí on 14 May. Two months later, Nelle completed a loan move to Primera B Nacional's Los Andes. Twenty-eight appearances in all competitions followed.

On 14 August 2017, Nelle joined Almagro on loan. He remained for 2017–18, featuring in twenty-three fixtures as Almagro lost in a championship play-off to Aldosivi. July 2018 saw Nelle loaned to Defensores de Belgrano. His first appearance came on 24 July in the Copa Argentina against Atlético de Rafaela, with their opponents winning 4–1.

== Career statistics ==
As of 15 December 2018.

Club statistics
Club	Season	League			Cup (Note: Includes the Copa Argentina)		League Cup		Continental (Note: Includes the Copa Libertadores and Copa Sudamericana)		Other		Total	
Club	Season	Division	Apps	Goals	Apps	Goals	Apps	Goals	Apps	Goals	Apps	Goals	Apps	Goals
Independiente	2016	Primera División	2	0	0	0	—		—		0	0	2	0
Independiente	2016–17	Primera División	0	0	0	0	—		0	0	0	0	0	0
Independiente	2017–18	Primera División	0	0	0	0	—		0	0	0	0	0	0
Independiente	2018–19	Primera División	0	0	0	0	—		0	0	0	0	0	0
Independiente	Total		2	0	0	0	—		0	0	0	0	2	0
Los Andes (loan)	2016–17	Primera B Nacional	27	0	1	0	—		—		0	0	28	0
Almagro (loan)	2017–18	Primera B Nacional	21	0	0	0	—		—		2 (Note: Two appearances in the 2017–18 Primera B Nacional play-offs)	0	23	0
Defensores de Belgrano (loan)	2018–19	Primera B Nacional	12	0	1	0	—		—		0	0	13	0
Career total			62	0	2	0	—		0	0	2	0	66	0
