= Ricardo Fuenzalida =

Chilean footballer (born 1992)

Personal information
- Full name: Ricardo Fuenzalida
- Date of birth: 23 November 1992 (age 33)
- Place of birth: Punta Arenas, Chile
- Position: Forward

Team information
- Current team: Provincial Osorno
- Number: 7

Youth career
- Deportes Puerto Montt

Senior career*
Years	Team	Apps	(Gls)
2012–2015	Deportes Puerto Montt	26	(0)
2015–2016	Deportes Linares	16	(2)
2016–2021	Deportes Melipilla	77	(3)
2019	→ Audax Italiano (loan)	6	(0)
2021	Deportes Santa Cruz	8	(0)
2022	Fénix	14	(1)
2023	Fernández Vial	20	(2)
2024	Concón National	18	(1)
2025–	Provincial Osorno	6	(0)
- * Club domestic league appearances and goals as of 5 May 2025

Ricardo Fuenzalida (born 23 November 1992) is a Chilean footballer who currently plays for Provincial Osorno.

== Career ==
In 2024, Fuenzalida signed with Concón National, then the recent promoted club to the Segunda División Profesional de Chile.
