= Manuel Araya (footballer, born 1958) =

Chilean footballer

Personal information
- Full name: Manuel Andrés Araya Ramos
- Date of birth: 30 November 1958 (age 67)
- Place of birth: Ovalle, Chile
- Position: Defender

Youth career
- Deportes Ovalle

Senior career*
Years	Team	Apps	(Gls)
1978–1982	Deportes Ovalle		
1983–1986	Cobresal	89	(3)
1986–1987	Tampico Madero	30	(2)
1987	Everton	27	(0)
1988–1989	Deportes La Serena	24	(1)

International career
1984	Chile Pre-Olympic	5	(0)
1984–1986	Chile	2	(0)
- * Club domestic league appearances and goals

Manuel Andrés Araya Ramos (born 30 November 1958) is a Chilean former footballer who played as a defender.

== Club career ==
Born in Ovalle, Chile, Araya is a historical player of the local team, Deportes Ovalle. In 1983, he joined Cobresal, winning the Segunda División and getting the promotion to the Chilean Primera División. He was part of the successful stint between 1984 and 1986, becoming the runners-up in the 1984 Primera División and taking part in the 1986 Copa Libertadores.

In the Chilean top level, Araya also played for Everton de Viña del Mar in 1987 and Deportes La Serena in 1988–89.

Abroad, Araya played for Primera División de México club Tampico Madero ion 1986–87.

== International career ==
Araya represented the Chile national team twice in the 0–0 draw against England on 17 June 1984 and the 1–1 draw against Brazil on 7 May 1986, playing alongside Manuel Pellegrini.

Previously, he represented Chile at the 1984 CONMEBOL Pre-Olympic Tournament, where they became the runners-up. However, he did not enter in the final squad for the 1984 Summer Olympics.

== Personal life ==
Araya is better known by his nickname Lechuga (Lettuce) due to the fact that he grew that vegetable while also his hairstyle.

On 12 March 2022, some media reported his death by misunderstanding with the homonym Manuel "Lechuga" Araya, a historical player of Curicó Unido.
