= Cobresal =

Chilean football club

- Full name: Club de Deportes Cobresal
- Nicknames: Mineros (Miners); Legionarios; El Milagro del Desierto (The Desert's Miracle)
- Founded: 5 May 1979; 47 years ago
- Ground: Estadio El Cobre; El Salvador, Chile
- Capacity: 12,000
- President: David Agüero Martinez
- Manager: Gustavo Huerta
- League: Liga de Primera
- 2025: Liga de Primera, 7th of 16
- Website: www.cdcobresal.cl
Home colours	Away colours

Club de Deportes Cobresal, or simply Cobresal, is a Chilean football club based in El Salvador, Atacama, a Chilean mining camp, and participates in Campeonato Nacional. The team was founded on 5 May 1979, and the name of the club comes from the local copper mine establishment. Since its inception, the club has played its home games at the El Cobre Stadium. With a capacity of approximately 12,000, the stadium is able to seat more than the entire population of the town (7,000).

During the history of Cobresal, the club has been champion once (2015 Clausura) and achieved one Copa Chile title in 1987, with players like the Chilean legend Iván Zamorano, Rubén Martínez and the club's historic top-scorer Sergio Salgado, footballers that also played in the 1986 Copa Libertadores, in the first international tournament for the club.

Cobresal's classic rival was Regional Atacama, where both teams disputed the III Region derby, but since the disappearance of that team as a result of financial problems, the team now plays the Copper derby with Cobreloa of Calama. Another important rivalry has been formed with another team from the Atacama region, Deportes Copiapó.

== Club history ==
=== First seasons ===
On 5 May 1979, Cobresal was officially founded as an amateur club, with Luis Sugarret as the first president. The club began to play friendly matches in preparation for the first game of the club against a professional team. On 14 June, the club played the first match of its history against Incabus of Diego de Almagro, debuting with a 3–2 win, playing in August of that year against the professional team of Coquimbo Unido, where Cobresal drew 3–3, playing of very well form. On 14 December 1979, Cobresal postulated to the National Association of Professional football for play in the Second Division. For this was necessary that the Club Deportivo Hospital, a club of El Salvador, a mining camp of the Atacama Region, offered its affiliation to the ANFA. Finally, on 26 February 1980, the incorporation of Cobresal was confirmed to the Second division as a professional team.

In 1980, Cobresal kicked off its inaugural season in the Second Division at the Luis Valenzuela Hermosilla Stadium with a 2–1 away defeat to Regional Atacama on 20 April, with goals of Franklin Lobos and Rubén Gonzáles, under the guidance of Cobresal's first head coach Juan Zárate. The club's first professional victory was a 2–1 win over Ñublense for the sixth round of the tournament. Cobresal finished his first season in the 14th place with 39 points. After a regular 1981 season, finishing in 10th place of the table, the next season thanks to the 5th place achieved, Cobresal qualified to the Promotion play-offs and the club was promoted to the Chilean Primera División, under the guidance of Manuel Rodríguez Araneda.

The club debuted in the Primera División with a 1–0 win over Arturo Fernández Vial at Concepción. However, Cobresal had the best season of its history finishing in the second place of the Group A, qualifying to the Championship play-offs. In the play-offs, Cobresal was runner-up of the tournament, achieving the second place under only two points of Universidad Católica. The 1985 season, the team qualified to the 1986 Copa Libertadores liguilla, and qualify to the first international tournament in its history, having in the 1986 year the most successful season in the history of the club, the next season, Cobresal won its first Copa Chile title in 1987 with players like Iván Zamorano, Rubén Martínez and Sergio Salgado. After the success in their last seasons, in 1989 suffered the departure Zamorano and Martínez.

=== The complicated 1990s ===
Cobresal began the 1990s with the left foot, when the club was relegated to the Primera B in 1992, after an eight-year stay in the topflight. For the next season, the club signed again to Manuel Rodríguez Araneda as coach, who achieves the mission of return to Cobresal to the Chilean Primera División, but being relegated again for the poor season of the club in the 15th place, after losing the Promotion play-offs.

With the signing of Sergio Nichiporuk on replace of Rodríguez, the club after two good season in Primera B, returned to the first tier of the Chilean football in 1998, being champion of the tournament of notable form not losing any match in the 1997 season, but again lost the category of be defeated 7–5 by Provincial Osorno in the aggregate result, via the Promotion play-offs. Finally, in 2001, thanks to the coach Jorge Socías, the club returned to the Chilean Primera División.

=== Successful seasons in the Primera División ===
With Socías at the bench for the 2002 Apertura Tournament, Cobresal won his first match since his return to the first division, 2–1 to Santiago Morning as visitor with goals of André Gómez and Jorge Baeza, receiving a goal of Carlos Cáceres from the other side. After a game win to Rangers, the club lost 4–1 their first game in the tournament against Unión San Felipe with a hat-trick of Francis Ferrero and a goal Cristian Leiva, and a goal of Jorge Baeza for Cobresal. The club began to lose the games that disputed and made a poor season finishing last of his group in the fifth place with 12 points. After the bad season in the Apertura, in the next tournament still with Socías as coach, Cobresal reached the play-offs quarter-finals, being eliminated by Colo-Colo, who finished be the champion of the Clausura.

After the departure of Jorge Socías, because the directive not renewed his contract, arrived Gustavo Huerta as coach, a former footballer of the club that played at Cobresal during the 1980s. After two defeats in the tournament, against Unión Española reached its first victory in the 2003 Apertura Tournament. They won 5–1 in home condition with goals of Juan Silva, Pedro Rivera, the Uruguayan centre back Alejandro Acosta, Damián Araya and Víctor González at El Cobre Stadium. The next week, Cobresal achieved an important 0–0 away draw with Universidad Católica at San Carlos. After the draw with Católica in Santiago, the club did not lose several matches, in where the most important results were a 4–0 home win over Coquimbo Unido and a 3–3 draw in the same condition with Universidad de Chile, that had good players like Mauricio Pinilla, Faustino Asprilla, Waldo Ponce and Marcos González. On 23 May, Cobresal achieved a very important victory 1–0 to Colo-Colo, who had as a key player to the former player of the club Iván Zamorano (aged 35 in 2003), who was an historic footballer in the club's short history at the moment. The club made a good campaign in the Apertura, qualifying in the 7th place of the table to the play-offs, winning in the first round to Colo-Colo, qualifying of rare form both teams, because the adversary of Cobresal qualified as best loser along with Huachipato, but in the next round the team was eliminated of the contest after a 7–1 loss with Universidad de Concepción. After the Huerta's departure of Cobresal, who accepted a bid of the Bolivian side Bolívar, arrived the coach Julio Acuña on his replace. Acuña reached the Clausura Tournament's semi-finals, being eliminated by Colo-Colo at the Estadio Monumental with goals of Silvio Fernández Dos Santos in the 81st minute and in the 83rd minute. If Cobresal won the semi-finals key, could have faced to his rival Cobreloa in the Clausura's tournament. In the 2004 season, after the bad results of Acuña, for the Clausura Tournament, the club re–signed to Huerta and achieved that Cobresal finished in the fourth place of the aggregate table.

In the 2005 Apertura Tournament, Cobresal achieved to qualify in the play-offs repechaje, but lost 4–3 against Deportes Concepción, in which scored in two times for the purple team Cristián Montecinos, Javier Cámpora and Hugo Centurión, whilst for Cobresal scored Diego Ruíz, Renzo Yáñez and César Carvajal. On 31 July, Huerta debuted the Clausura Tournament of the year with a 2–0 home win over Huachipato with goals of Yáñez and César Díaz. One week later, on 7 August, the club lost his first game in the tournament against Deportes Puerto Montt at Chinquihue, being defeated by that club 1–0 with a goal of Domingo Martínez in the 84th minute. After another defeat with Santiago Wanderers and a 1–1 draw with Coquimbo Unido, the club return to the triumphs against Unión San Felipe at El Cobre Stadium, winning with a goal of Yáñez and a twice of Díaz. The following week, Cobresal achieved an important 3–2 away victory over Deportes La Serena at La Portada with goals of Díaz again, Patricio Lira and Christian Mauvezin for Cobresal, the next match achieving another important result in the tournament, now at El Salvador, drawing 2–2 with Colo-Colo that is playing very well in this moment. The goals of Cobresal was of César Díaz and Renzo Yáñez in the 32nd minute and in the 47th minute, respectively. The team including was winning 2–0 the match, but with goals of Gonzalo Fierro in the 60th minute and a goal of Héctor Tapia in the 77th minute, Colo-Colo equalized the game, having also opportunities of win it. Cobresal after one loss with Everton, the club won the Copper derby with a hat-trick of Díaz at El Cobre Stadium, achieving the next week an important 1–1 home draw Universidad de Chile, team that won the game with a goal of Waldo Ponce, but a goal of Luis Díaz in the 92nd minute equalized the game. The following match of the team in the Clausura against Universidad Católica was lost 1–0 with a goal of Jorge Ormeño in the 29th minute, game in also the keeper of the adversary José María Buljubasich achieved 1,323 minutes without conceding a goal. Cobresal finally qualified to the play-offs, being in the first position of his group with 27 points. After the defeat to Huachipato in the aggregate result, the club advanced to the semi-finals against Universidad de Chile, the first semi-final the club won 2–1 with goals from Juan Quiroga and Patricio Lira, whilst Marcelo Salas scored for "La U", but Cobresal lost the second 4–2 in the Estadio Nacional.

== Stadium ==
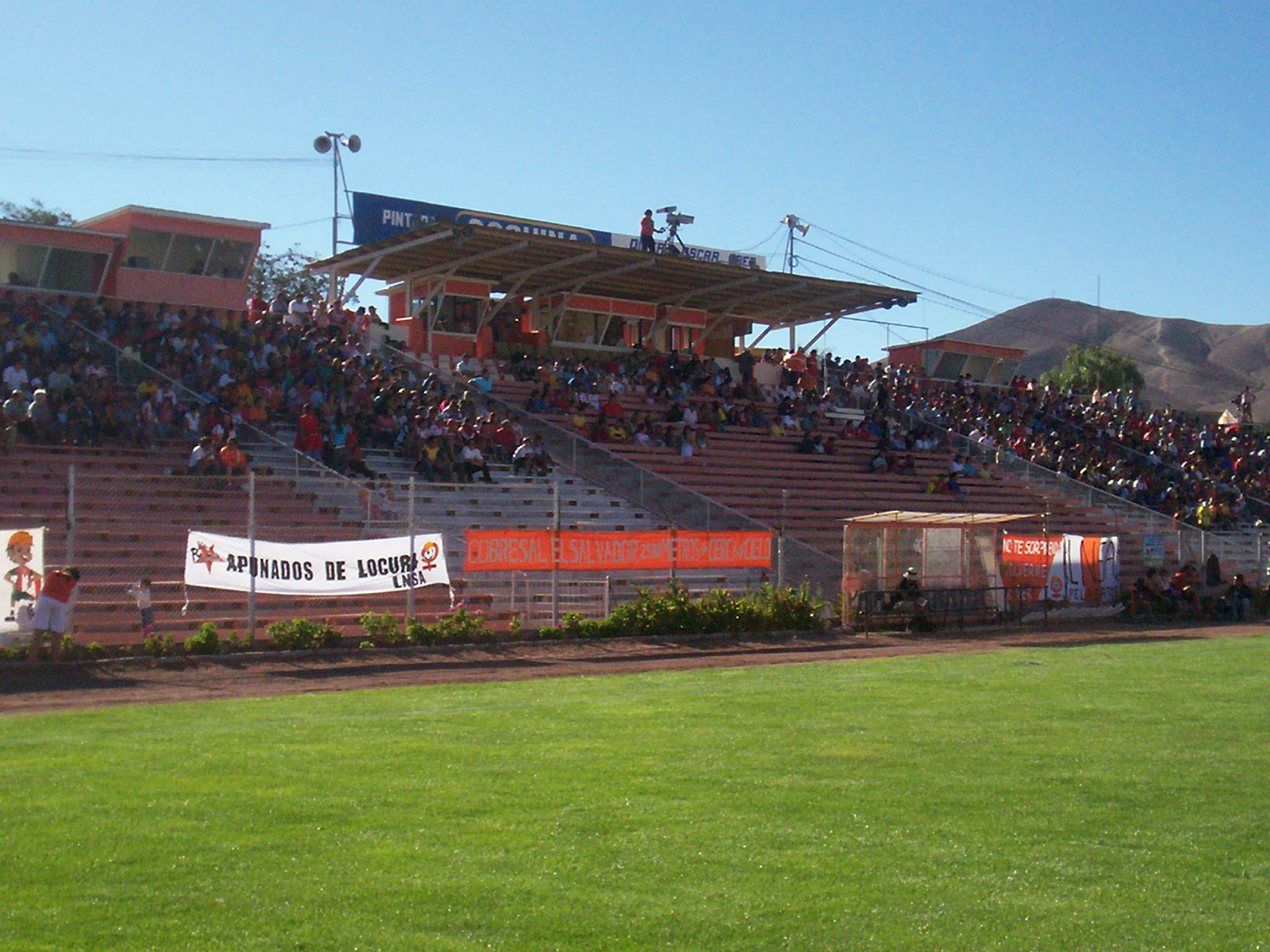
El Cobre Stadium during the afternoon

When Cobresal postulated for play in the Second division, one of the requirements was an appropriate stadium with a grass field. This was a great problem for the club, because El Salvador is located in the middle of the Atacama Desert it would be expensive to place grass. But the directive and the population's people achieved the construction of a new stadium that would have grass in the zone of the Sausalito field. Finally, after nearly a year of construction, El Cobre Stadium was opened on 1 June 1980.

Years later, the capacity was increased to 20,752 persons to conform with CONMEBOL rules due to the participation of Cobresal in the 1986 Copa Libertadores, despite the village's population being only a third of the stadium's capacity. In 1999, the artificial lights were installed to facilitate television broadcasts. The current capacity is 12,000 people, due to the elimination of standing-only zones for security reasons.

== Honours ==
=== National ===
- Primera División
  - Winners (1): 2015 Clausura
- Copa Chile
  - Winners (1): 1987
- Primera B de Chile
  - Winners (2): 1983, 1998

== Club facts ==
- 30 Seasons in Primera División: (1984–1992, 1994, 1999, 2002–2016/17, 2019–)
- 13 Seasons in Primera B: (1980–1983, 1993, 1995–1998, 2000–2001, 2017–2018)
- 2 Participations in Copa Libertadores (1986, 2016)
- 3 Participations in Copa Sudamericana (2014, 2021, 2023)
- Record Primera División victory – 8–1 v. Provincial Osorno (1991)
- Record Primera División defeat – 0–7 v. Universidad Católica (2002-A)
- Most goals scored Primera División matches – 83, Sergio Salgado (1984–88, 1994)
- Most goals scored overall – 274, Sergio Salgado (1980–88, 1993–96)
- Highest home attendance – 15,229 v. América de Cali Copa Libertadores, (18 April 1986)

== South American cups history ==
Season	Competition	Round	Country	Club	Home	Away	Aggregate
1986	Copa Libertadores	Group stage Group 4	(Chile)	Universidad Católica	1–1	1–0	3rd Place
1986	Copa Libertadores	Group stage Group 4	(Colombia)	América de Cali	2–2	0–0	3rd Place
1986	Copa Libertadores	Group stage Group 4	(Colombia)	Deportivo Cali	1–1	1–1	3rd Place
2014	Copa Sudamericana	First Round	(Paraguay)	General Díaz	2–2	1–2	3–4
2016	Copa Libertadores	Second stage Group 8	(Brazil)	Corinthians	0–1	0–6	4th Place
2016	Copa Libertadores	Second stage Group 8	(Paraguay)	Cerro Porteño	2–0	1–2	4th Place
2016	Copa Libertadores	Second stage Group 8	(Colombia)	Independiente Santa Fe	1–2	0–3	4th Place
2021	Copa Sudamericana	First Round	(Chile)	Palestino	0–0	1–2	1–2
2023	Copa Sudamericana	First Round	(Chile)	Palestino	0–1	—	0–1

== Players ==
=== Current squad ===
Current squad of C.D. Cobresal as of 31 July 2026 (edit)
Sources: ANFP Official Web Site

No.		Position	Player
1	CHI	GK	Renato González
2	CHI	DF	Axel Fuentes
3	CHI	DF	Benjamín Villarroel
4	CHI	DF	Rodrigo Sandoval
6	CHI	MF	Esteban Valencia
7	PAN	FW	César Yanis
8	CHI	FW	Steffan Pino (loan from Deportes Iquique)
10	CHI	MF	Bryan Carvallo
11	ARG	FW	Julián Brea
12	CHI	GK	Alejandro Santander
13	CHI	MF	Benjamín Valenzuela
14	CHI	FW	Renato Huerta (loan from Universidad de Chile)
15	CHI	DF	Antonio Castillo
16	ARG	DF	Franco Bechtholdt
17	CHI	MF	Juan Fuentes
18	ARG	DF	Christian Moreno
19	CHI	FW	Sergio Carrasco
20	CHI	DF	José Tiznado (c)
21	CHI	FW	Matías Sepúlveda
22	VEN	DF	Aaron Astudillo

No.		Position	Player
23	CHI	DF	Guillermo Pacheco
24	CHI	MF	Benjamín Ramírez
25	CHI	GK	Matías Vásquez
26	CHI	MF	Vicente Belmar
27	CHI	MF	Milan Roki
28	CHI	FW	Francisco Moreno
31	CHI	MF	Dennis Leyton
32	ARG	FW	Franco Frías (loan from Rosario Central)
34	CHI	DF	Anibal Gajardo
35	CHI	MF	Matías Contreras
36	CHI	GK	Matías Olguín
37	CHI	FW	Martín Espinoza (loan to Universidad de Chile)
38	CHI	MF	Felipe Villagrán
39	PAN	FW	Janpol Morales
40	CHI	FW	Facundo Vergara
41	VEN	MF	Edgar Nava
42	CHI	DF	Vicente Torres
43	CHI	DF	Víctor Campos (loan from Colo-Colo)
44	CHI	GK	Camilo Sepúlveda

Manager: Gustavo Huerta

=== 2026 Winter Transfers ===
==== In ====
Note: Flags indicate national team as defined under FIFA eligibility rules; some limited exceptions apply. Players may hold more than one non-FIFA nationality.

No.	Pos.	Nation	Player
36	GK	CHI	Matías Olguín (from Magallanes)
37	FW	CHI	Martín Espinoza (loan from Universidad de Chile)
38	MF	CHI	Felipe Villagrán (from Everton)

No.	Pos.	Nation	Player
39	FW	PAN	Janpol Morales (from Comunicaciones)
43	DF	CHI	Víctor Campos (loan from Colo-Colo)
—	DF	PAR	Fernando González (from Universidad de Chile)

==== Out ====
Note: Flags indicate national team as defined under FIFA eligibility rules; some limited exceptions apply. Players may hold more than one non-FIFA nationality.

No.	Pos.	Nation	Player
5	MF	URU	Agustín Nadruz (to Sarmiento de Junín)
29	MF	CHI	Oliver Ramis (loan to Trasandino)

No.	Pos.	Nation	Player
30	GK	ECU	Jorge Pinos (released)

=== Notable players ===
- (Chile) Manuel Araya
- (Chile) Gustavo Huerta
- (Chile) Rubén Martínez
- (Chile) Sergio Salgado
- (Chile) Iván Zamorano
- (Paraguay) Ever Cantero

== Managers ==
- (Chile) Kid Larco (1979)
- (Chile) Onofre Tito (1979)
- (Argentina) Juan Zárate (1979)
- (Chile) Óscar Andrade (1980)
- (Argentina) Juan Zárate (1980)
- (Chile) Guillermo Díaz (1981)
- (Chile) Alicel Belmar (1982)
- (Chile) Manuel Rodríguez (1983–1989)
- (Chile) Reynaldo Hoffmann (1989–1991)
- (Chile) Gustavo Huerta + (Argentina) Juan Zárate (1991–1992)
- (Chile) Manuel Rodríguez (1993–1994)
- (Paraguay) Sergio Nichiporuk (1995–1996)
- (Chile) Rolando García (1997)
- (Paraguay) Sergio Nichiporuk (1998–1999)
- (Uruguay) Ricardo Ortiz (1999)
- (Chile) Manuel Soto (2000)
- (Chile) Hermes Navarro (2000)
- (Chile) Jorge Socías (2001–2002)
- (Chile) Gustavo Huerta (2003)
- (Uruguay) Julio Acuña (2003–2004)
- (Chile) Gustavo Huerta (2004–2005)
- (Chile) Fernando Díaz (2006)
- (Paraguay) Sergio Nichiporuk (2006)
- (Chile) José Cantillana (2007–2009)
- (Chile) Luis Musrri (2010–2012)
- (Chile) Óscar del Solar (2012–2013)
- (Chile) José Cantillana (2013–2014)
- (Argentina) Dalcio Giovagnoli (2014–2015)
- (Chile) Arturo Norambuena (2015)
- (Chile) Rubén Vallejos (2015)
- (Argentina) Dalcio Giovagnoli (2016)
- (Chile) Emiliano Astorga (2017)
- (Chile) Rubén Vallejos (2017)
- (Chile) Gustavo Huerta (2017–present)
