= Domingo Martinez (author) =

American author

- Writing career
- Years active: 2012 -
- Genre: Memoir
- Subject: Life of immigrant Mexican families in Texas
- Notable works: The Boy Kings of Texas (2012); My Heart Is a Drunken Compass (2014)

Domingo Martinez is an American author best known for his memoirs The Boy Kings of Texas (published 2012) and My Heart Is a Drunken Compass (published 2014). The Boy Kings of Texas was a non-fiction finalist for the 2012 National Book Award and a New York Times Best Seller. These books describe his difficult childhood in Brownsville, Texas, as well as his later struggles as an adult while living in Seattle, Washington. The Boy Kings of Texas is a Gold Medal Winner of the Independent Publishers Book Award 2012, a Non-Fiction Finalist for The Washington State Book Awards, and was nominated for a 2013 Pushcart Prize among other accolades.

His writing has appeared in The New York Times, Texas Monthly, The New Republic, Saveur Magazine, Huisache Literary Magazine, Epiphany Literary Journal, and he is a regular contributor to This American Life and NPR's All Things Considered, and was the recipient of the Bernard De Voto Fellowship for Non-Fiction at Bread Loaf Writer’s Colony.
