= Diego Arias (Chilean footballer) =

Chilean footballer (born 1999)

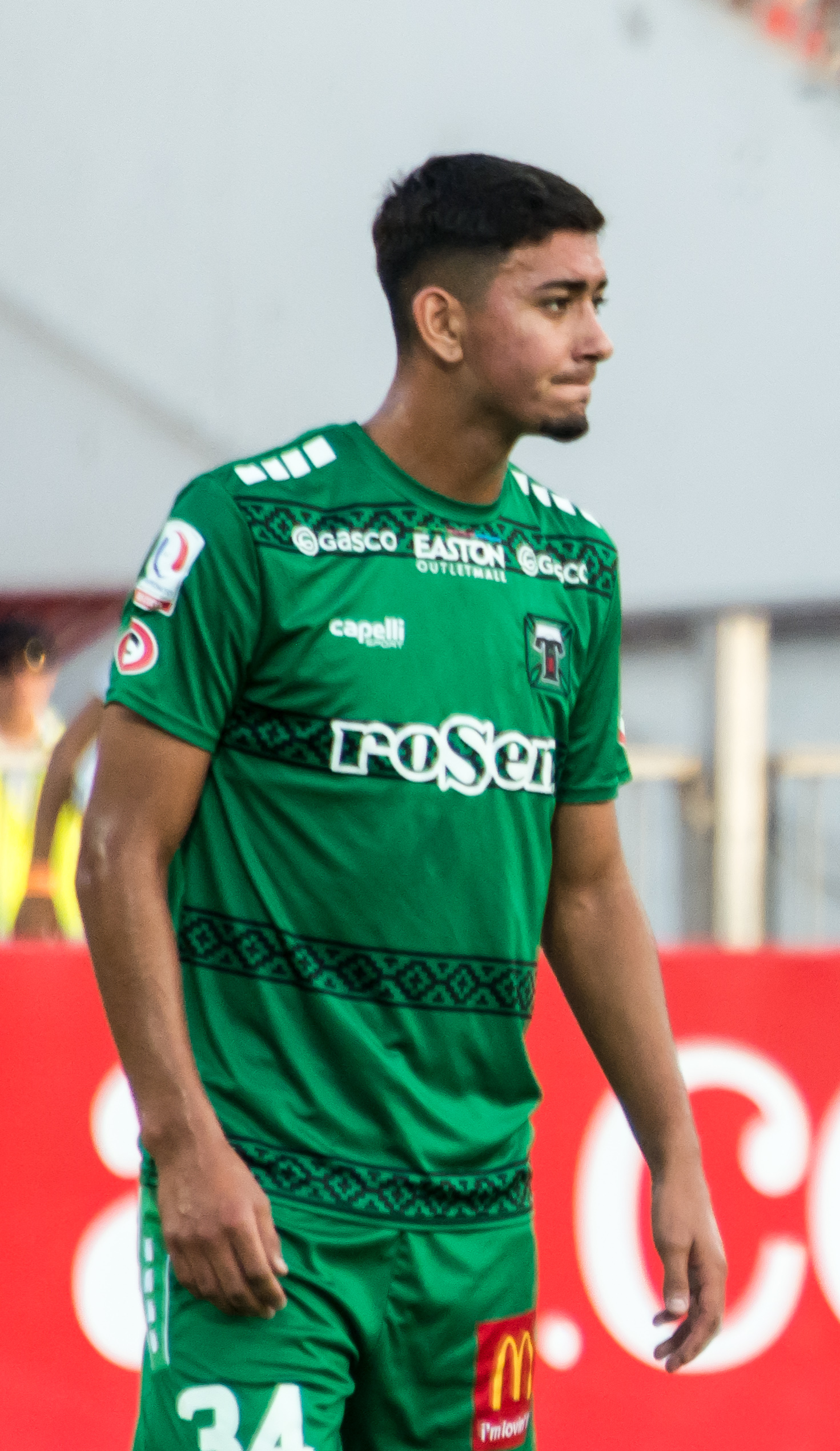
- Arias with Deportes Temuco in 2020

Personal information
- Full name: Diego Rafael Nicolás Arias Quero
- Date of birth: 8 December 1999 (age 26)
- Place of birth: Angol, Chile
- Position: Forward

Youth career
- Deportes Temuco

Senior career*
Years	Team	Apps	(Gls)
2018–2021	Deportes Temuco	45	(2)
2022	Deportes Santa Cruz	29	(3)
2023	Deportes La Serena	21	(0)
2024–2025	Santiago Wanderers	17	(1)
2025	→ Santiago Morning (loan)	11	(2)
2026	Deportes Santa Cruz	24	(17)
- * Club domestic league appearances and goals as of 19 November 2026

Diego Rafael Nicolás Arias Quero (born 8 December 1999) is a Chilean footballer who plays as a forward.

== Career ==
In February 2024, Arias signed with Santiago Wanderers. In the second half of 2025, he moved to Santiago Morning.

In January 2026, Arias joined Deportes Santa Cruz. On 21 March, he scored the four winning goals in the 4–2 against Curicó Unido.
