= Nicolás Del Priore =

Argentine footballer (born 1996)

Personal information
- Full name: Matías Nicolás Del Priore
- Date of birth: 14 August 1996 (age 30)
- Place of birth: Lomas de Zamora, Argentina
- Height: 1.82 m (5 ft 11 1/2 in)
- Position: Midfielder

Team information
- Current team: Tristán Suárez

Youth career
- Independiente

Senior career*
| Years | Team | Apps | (Gls) |
| 2018–2022 | Independiente | 0 | (0) |
| 2018–2019 | → Defensores (loan) | 18 | (0) |
| 2019–2020 | → Villa Dálmine (loan) | 18 | (1) |
| 2020 | → Deportes Santa Cruz (loan) | 13 | (0) |
| 2021 | → Estudiantes BA (loan) | 9 | (0) |
| 2021 | → Almirante Brown (loan) | 4 | (0) |
| 2022–2025 | Deportivo Maipú | 76 | (1) |
| 2022 | → Politehnica Iași (loan) | 6 | (0) |
| 2025– | Tristán Suárez | 29 | (1) |
- * Club domestic league appearances and goals as of 17:16, 6 May 2026 (UTC)

Matías Nicolás Del Priore (born 14 August 1996) is an Argentine professional footballer who plays as a midfielder for Tristán Suárez.

== Career ==
Del Priore started in the ranks of Independiente. In July 2018, Del Priore was loaned out to Primera B Nacional side Defensores de Belgrano. Having been an unused substitute six times in all competitions, he made his professional debut on 3 November during a 1–1 draw with Independiente Rivadavia. Seventeen further appearances arrived in 2018–19. Del Priore spent the subsequent 2019–20 campaign on loan with Villa Dálmine. He featured eighteen times and scored once; netting in his final match on 1 March 2020 in a defeat away from home versus Gimnasia y Esgrima.

On 3 November 2020, Del Priore was loaned out for a third time as he agreed a six-month deal with Primera B de Chile team Deportes Santa Cruz. His debut arrived a day later during a home win over Unión San Felipe. However, the spell was cut short and he was recalled at the end of January 2021. Following the spell in Chile, he had to loan spells at Estudiantes de Buenos Aires and Almirante Brown in 2021.

In February 2022, Del Priore joined Primera Nacional side Deportivo Maipú on a three-year deal.

== Career statistics ==
As of 28 December 2020.

Club statistics
| Club | Season | League | | | Cup | | League Cup | | Continental | | Other | | Total | |
| Club | Season | Division | Apps | Goals | Apps | Goals | Apps | Goals | Apps | Goals | Apps | Goals | Apps | Goals |
|---|---|---|---|---|---|---|---|---|---|---|---|---|---|---|
| Independiente | 2018–19 | Primera División | 0 | 0 | 0 | 0 | 0 | 0 | 0 | 0 | 0 | 0 | 0 | 0 |
| Independiente | 2019–20 | Primera División | 0 | 0 | 0 | 0 | 0 | 0 | 0 | 0 | 0 | 0 | 0 | 0 |
| Independiente | 2020–21 | Primera División | 0 | 0 | 0 | 0 | 0 | 0 | 0 | 0 | 0 | 0 | 0 | 0 |
| Independiente | Total | | 0 | 0 | 0 | 0 | 0 | 0 | 0 | 0 | 0 | 0 | 0 | 0 |
| Defensores de Belgrano (loan) | 2018–19 | Primera B Nacional | 18 | 0 | 0 | 0 | — | | — | | 0 | 0 | 18 | 0 |
| Villa Dálmine (loan) | 2019–20 | Primera B Nacional | 18 | 1 | 0 | 0 | — | | — | | 0 | 0 | 18 | 1 |
| Deportes Santa Cruz (loan) | 2020 | Primera B | 10 | 0 | 0 | 0 | — | | — | | 0 | 0 | 10 | 0 |
| Career total | | | 46 | 1 | 0 | 0 | 0 | 0 | 0 | 0 | 0 | 0 | 46 | 1 |
