= Mauro Molina (Argentine footballer) =

Argentine footballer (born 1999)

Personal information
- Full name: Mauro Julián Molina
- Date of birth: 29 July 1999 (age 27)
- Place of birth: Florencio Varela, Argentina
- Height: 1.83 m (6 ft 0 in)
- Position: Forward

Team information
- Current team: Dock Sud

Youth career
- 2005–2017: Independiente

Senior career*
Years	Team	Apps	(Gls)
2017–2024	Independiente	6	(0)
2020–2021	→ Temperley (loan)	29	(3)
2022	→ Quilmes (loan)	14	(2)
2023	→ Def. de Belgrano (loan)	13	(1)
2024	Güemes	2	(0)
2024–2026	Dock Sud	46	(12)
2026–	Estudiantes RC	0	(0)
- * Club domestic league appearances and goals as of 18:21, 23 February 2026 (UTC)

Mauro Julián Molina (born 29 July 1999) is an Argentine professional footballer who plays as a forward for Estudiantes RC.

== Career ==
Molina joined Independiente's youth system in 2005. He began his senior career with the club in the Primera División in 2017. His professional debut came on 9 December, appearing for the final moments of a 1–2 win over Arsenal de Sarandí. Seven appearances followed across 2018–19, as did his first senior goal in a 4–0 Copa Argentina win over Atlas on 6 March 2019. Molina didn't feature competitively in 2019–20, partly due to injury and the COVID-19 pandemic. In September 2020, Molina was loaned to Primera B Nacional with Temperley.

On 15 February 2022, Molina joined Primera Nacional club Quilmes until the end of the year.

== Personal life ==
In August 2020, it was announced that Molina had tested positive for COVID-19 amid the pandemic; he isolated with mild symptoms.

== Career statistics ==
As of 26 October 2020.

Club statistics
Club	Season	League			Cup		League Cup		Continental		Other		Total	
Club	Season	Division	Apps	Goals	Apps	Goals	Apps	Goals	Apps	Goals	Apps	Goals	Apps	Goals
Independiente	2017–18	Primera División	1	0	0	0	—		0	0	0	0	1	0
Independiente	2018–19	Primera División	5	0	1	1	0	0	1 (Note: Appearance(s) in the Copa Sudamericana)	0	0	0	7	1
Independiente	2019–20	Primera División	0	0	0	0	0	0	0	0	0	0	0	0
Independiente	2020–21	Primera División	0	0	0	0	0	0	0	0	0	0	0	0
Independiente	Total		6	0	1	1	0	0	1	0	0	0	8	1
Temperley (loan)	2020–21	Primera B Nacional	0	0	0	0	—		—		0	0	0	0
Career total			6	0	1	1	0	0	1	0	0	0	8	1
