= Domingo Martínez (footballer) =

Paraguayan footballer (born 1982)

Domingo Gabriel Martínez Saucedo (born 4 August 1982) is a Paraguayan former professional footballer who played as a centre-back or defensive midfielder.

== Career ==
- Nacional Asunción 2004
- Cobreloa 2005
- Deportes Puerto Montt 2005–2006
- Nacional Asunción 2006–2008
- 2 de Mayo 2009
- Independiente José Terán 2010–2011
- Macará 2011–2013
- Aucas 2013
