= 2017–18 Club Atlético Independiente season =

Club Atlético Independiente
2017–18 season
- President: Hugo Moyano
- Manager: Ariel Holan
- Stadium: Estadio Libertadores de América
- Primera División: 6th
- 2016–17 Copa Argentina: Round of 32
- 2017–18 Copa Argentina: Round of 64
- 2017 Copa Sudamericana: Winners
- 2018 Copa Libertadores: Round of 16
- Top goalscorer: League: Leandro Fernández (6); Martín Benítez (6); All: Leandro Fernández (10)

The 2017–18 season is Club Atlético Independiente's 5th consecutive season in the top-flight of Argentine football. The season covers the period from 1 July 2017 to 30 June 2018.

== Current squad ==
As of 19 March 2018.

Note: Flags indicate national team as defined under FIFA eligibility rules; some limited exceptions apply. Players may hold more than one non-FIFA nationality.

No.	Pos.	Nation	Player
1	GK	ARG	Damián Albil
2	DF	ARG	Alan Franco
4	DF	ARG	Jorge Figal
5	MF	ARG	Nicolás Domingo
6	MF	ARG	Juan Sánchez Miño
7	FW	ARG	Martín Benítez
8	MF	ARG	Maximiliano Meza
9	FW	ARG	Emmanuel Gigliotti
10	MF	ECU	Fernando Gaibor
11	FW	ARG	Leandro Fernández
13	GK	ARG	Gonzalo Rehak
14	DF	VEN	Fernando Amorebieta
15	MF	URU	Diego Martín Rodríguez
16	DF	ARG	Fabricio Bustos
17	FW	ARG	Braian Romero
18	FW	ARG	Silvio Romero
19	FW	ARG	Gastón Togni

No.	Pos.	Nation	Player
20	MF	URU	Gastón Silva
21	MF	ARG	Domingo Blanco
22	FW	ARG	Juan Manuel Martínez
23	DF	ARG	Emanuel Brítez
24	DF	ARG	Rodrigo Miguel Moreira
25	GK	URU	Martín Campaña
26	MF	ARG	Jonás Gutiérrez
27	FW	ARG	Jonathan Menéndez
30	MF	ARG	Gonzalo Verón
31	DF	ARG	Gonzalo Asis
32	MF	ARG	Christian Ortiz
33	FW	ARG	Francisco Pizzini
34	DF	ARG	Sergio Barreto
35	MF	ARG	Diego Mercado
36	DF	ARG	Juan Di Lorenzo
38	FW	ARG	Mauro Molina

=== Out on loan ===
Note: Flags indicate national team as defined under FIFA eligibility rules; some limited exceptions apply. Players may hold more than one non-FIFA nationality.

No.	Pos.	Nation	Player
4	DF	ARG	Gustavo Toledo (at Colón until 30 June 2018)
5	MF	ARG	Julián Vitale (at Unión Santa Fe until 30 June 2018)
20	DF	ARG	Damián Martínez (at Unión Santa Fe until 30 June 2018)
—	MF	ARG	Franco Bellocq (at Olimpo until 30 June 2018)
—	FW	ARG	Gastón del Castillo (at Arsenal de Sarandí until 30 June 2018)
—	DF	ARG	Néstor Breitenbruch (at Correcaminos UAT until 30 June 2018)

No.	Pos.	Nation	Player
—	MF	ARG	Jorge Ortiz (at Belgrano until 30 June 2018)
—	FW	ARG	Mauricio del Castillo (at Defensores de Belgrano until 30 June 2018)
—	FW	ARG	Nicolás Messiniti (at San Martín until 30 June 2018)
—	DF	ARG	Sergio Ojeda (at Olimpo until 30 June 2018)
—	MF	ARG	Walter Erviti (at Alvarado until 30 June 2018)
—	FW	ARG	Lucas Albertengo (at Monterrey until 31 December 2018)

== Transfers ==
=== In ===
Date	Pos.	Name	From	Fee
6 July 2017	MF	(Argentina) Jonás Gutiérrez	(Argentina) Defensa y Justicia	Undisclosed
10 July 2017	DF	(Venezuela) Fernando Amorebieta	(Spain) Sporting Gijón	Undisclosed
19 July 2017	MF	(Argentina) Nicolás Domingo	(Argentina) River Plate	Undisclosed
30 August 2017	DF	(Uruguay) Gastón Silva	(Italy) Torino	Undisclosed
23 January 2018	FW	(Argentina) Jonathan Menéndez	(Argentina) Talleres de Córdoba	US$3 Million
23 January 2018	FW	(Argentina) Braian Romero	(Argentina) Argentinos Juniors	US$2.3 Million
25 January 2018	MF	(Ecuador) Fernando Gaibor	(Ecuador) Emelec	US$4.2 Million
30 January 2018	FW	(Argentina) Silvio Romero	(Mexico) América	US$4.2 Million
30 January 2018	FW	(Argentina) Gonzalo Verón	(United States) D.C. United	Free

=== Out ===
Date	Pos.	Name	To	Fee
1 July 2017	MF	(Argentina) Jorge Márquez	(Argentina) Las Palmas	Undisclosed
22 July 2017	MF	(Argentina) Claudio Aquino	(Argentina) Unión Santa Fe	Undisclosed
30 July 2017	GK	(Argentina) Diego Rodríguez	(Argentina) Rosario Central	Undisclosed
16 August 2017	FW	(Argentina) Jonathan Cañete	(Argentina) Argentinos Juniors	Undisclosed
22 August 2017	MF	(Argentina) Emiliano Rigoni	(Russia) Zenit	Undisclosed
4 January 2018	MF	(Argentina) Nicolás Tagliafico	(Netherlands) Ajax	US$4.9 Million
16 January 2018	MF	(Argentina) Ezequiel Barco	(United States) Atlanta United	US$15 Million

=== Loan in ===
Date from	Date to	Pos.	Name	From
31 December 2017	31 December 2018	DF	(Argentina) Emanuel Brítez	(Argentina) Unión de Santa Fe

=== Loan out ===
Date from	Date to	Pos.	Name	To
19 July 2017	30 June 2018	FW	(Argentina) Gastón del Castillo	(Argentina) Arsenal de Sarandí
19 July 2017	30 June 2018	DF	(Argentina) Gustavo Toledo	(Argentina) Colón
22 July 2017	30 June 2018	FW	(Argentina) Nicolás Messiniti	(Argentina) San Martín
25 July 2017	30 June 2018	DF	(Argentina) Sergio Ojeda	(Argentina) Olimpo
26 July 2017	30 June 2018	MF	(Argentina) Franco Bellocq	(Argentina) Olimpo
2 August 2017	30 June 2018	DF	(Argentina) Damián Martínez	(Argentina) Unión Santa Fe
2 August 2017	30 June 2018	MF	(Argentina) Julián Vitale	(Argentina) Unión Santa Fe
8 August 2017	30 June 2018	FW	(Argentina) Mauricio del Castillo	(Argentina) Defensores de Belgrano

== Pre-season and friendlies ==
=== Friendlies ===
Win Draw Loss

26 July 2017 Friendly	Independiente (Argentina)	3–0	(Argentina) Villa San Carlos	Avellaneda, Argentina
10:00	N. Domínguez; M. Meza; L. Fernández (pen.)	Report		Stadium: Estadio Libertadores de América

26 July 2017 Friendly	Independiente (Argentina)	2–0	(Argentina) Villa San Carlos	Avellaneda, Argentina
11:30	L. Albertengo; M. Benítez	Report		Stadium: Estadio Libertadores de América

29 July 2017 Friendly	Independiente (Argentina)	1–0	(Argentina) Tristán Suárez	Avellaneda, Argentina
10:00	G. Togni	Report		Stadium: Estadio Libertadores de América

29 July 2017 Friendly	Independiente (Argentina)	1–0	(Argentina) Tristán Suárez	Avellaneda, Argentina
11:30	E. Denis	Report		Stadium: Estadio Libertadores de América

4 August 2017 Friendly	Independiente (Argentina)	4–1	(Argentina) UAI Urquiza	Avellaneda, Argentina
10:00	L. Albertengo; G. Togni	Report	E. Díaz	Stadium: Estadio Libertadores de América

12 August 2017 Friendly	Independiente (Argentina)	2–0	(Argentina) UAI Urquiza	Avellaneda, Argentina
	L. Fernández; M. Meza	Report		Stadium: Estadio Libertadores de América

1 September 2017 Friendly	Independiente (Argentina)	2–1	(Argentina) San Lorenzo	Avellaneda, Argentina
	L. Fernández; L. Albertengo	Report	N. Reniero	Stadium: Estadio Libertadores de América

1 September 2017 Friendly	Independiente (Argentina)	0–1	(Argentina) San Lorenzo	Avellaneda, Argentina
		Report	Goal	Stadium: Estadio Libertadores de América

=== Torneos de Verano ===
13 January 2018 Friendly	Independiente (Argentina)	0–0 (3–5 p)	(Argentina) Gimnasia y Esgrima La Plata	Mar del Plata, Argentina
	Campaña (yellow card) 37'; Togni (yellow card) 82'	Report	Bonifacio (yellow card) 34'; Alemán (yellow card) 61'	Stadium: Estadio José María Minella

19 January 2018	Independiente (Argentina)	2–2 (3–1 p)	(Argentina) Racing Club	Mar del Plata, Argentina
	Fernández 9' (pen.), 22'; Amorebieta (yellow card) 56'; Albertengo (yellow card) 81'	Report	Martínez 26', 90'; González (yellow card) 86'; Barbieri (red card) 91'	Stadium: Estadio José María Minella

== Competitions ==
=== Overview ===
Competition	First match	Last match	Starting round	Final position	Record							
Competition	First match	Last match	Starting round	Final position	Pld	W	D	L	GF	GA	GD	Win %
Primera División	26 August 2017	13 May 2018	Matchday 1	6th	27	13	7	7	29	19	+10	48.15
Copa Argentina	17 May 2017	19 September 2017	Round of 64	Round of 32	2	1	0	1	1	2	−1	50.00
Copa Sudamericana	4 April 2017	13 December 2017	First stage	Winners	12	8	2	2	21	9	+12	66.67
Recopa Sudamericana	14 February 2018	21 February 2018	Final	Runners-up	2	0	1	1	1	1	+0	0.00
Copa Libertadores	1 March 2018		Group stage		6	3	1	2	6	4	+2	50.00
Total					49	25	11	13	58	35	+23	51.02

Last updated: 4 April 2018.
Source: Competitions

=== Primera División ===
==== Standings ====
Pos	Team	Pld	W	D	L	GF	GA	GD	Pts	Qualification
4	Huracán	27	13	9	5	35	24	+11	48	Qualification for Copa Libertadores group stage
5	Talleres (C)	27	13	7	7	33	20	+13	46	Qualification for Copa Libertadores second stage
6	Independiente	27	13	7	7	29	19	+10	46	Qualification for Copa Sudamericana first stage
7	Racing	27	13	6	8	46	32	+14	45	Qualification for Copa Sudamericana first stage
8	River Plate	27	13	6	8	39	26	+13	45	Qualification for Copa Libertadores group stage (Note: River Plate qualified for the Copa Libertadores group stage by winning the 2018 Copa Libertadores.)

Source: AFA
Rules for classification: 1) points; 2) play-off (only if needed to decide championship); 3) goal difference; 4) goals scored; 5) head-to-head points; 6) head-to-head goal difference; 7) head-to-head goals scored.

==== Results by round ====
Round	1	2	3	4	5	6	7	8	9	10	11	12	13	14	15	16	17	18	19	20	21	22	23	24	25	26	27
Ground	H	A	H	A	H	A	H	A	H	A	H	A	H	A	H	A	H	A	H	A	H	A	H	H	A	H	A
Result	W	D	L	L	W	W	D	D	W	W	W	D	L	W	L	D	W	W	W	D	L	W	W	L	W	D	L
Position	4	5	5	13	15	15	11	12	11	8	7	6	4	8	5	6	7	4	3	5	6	5	4	6	5	5	6

Updated to match(es) played on 19 March 2018. Source: ESPN
A = Away; H = Home; W = Win; D = Draw; L = Loss

==== Matchday ====
26 August 2017 1	Independiente	3–1	Huracán	Avellaneda
20:05 ART	Benítez 21', 78'; Fernández 60'; Bustos (yellow card) 72'		Ábila 18'; Compagnucci (yellow card) 29'; Villalba (yellow card) 82'	Stadium: Estadio Libertadores de América; Attendance: 20,000; Referee: Patricio Loustau

8 September 2017 2	Olimpo	1–1	Independiente	Bahía Blanca
21:15 ART	Nasuti (yellow card) 44'; Vila 71'		Fernández 31'; Domínguez (yellow card) 60'	Stadium: Estadio Roberto Natalio Carminatti; Attendance: 8,500; Referee: José Ignacio Baliño

16 September 2017 3	Independiente	0–1	Lanús	Avellaneda
20:05 ART	Barco (yellow card) 24'; Martínez (yellow card) 65'; Gutiérrez (yellow card) 77'		García (yellow card) 35'; Denis (yellow card) 90+1'; Denis 90+6' (pen.)	Stadium: Estadio Libertadores de América; Attendance: 25,000; Referee: Fernando Espinoza

23 September 2017 4	Godoy Cruz	1–0	Independiente	Mendoza
20:05 ART	Angileri (yellow card) 41'; Fernández (yellow card) 44'; García 60' (pen.); Giménez (yellow card) 90+3'		Rodríguez (yellow card) 22'; Sánchez Miño (yellow card) 58'	Stadium: Estadio Malvinas Argentinas; Referee: Patricio Loustau

1 October 2017 5	Independiente	1–0	Vélez Sarsfield	Avellaneda
16:05 ART	Domingo (yellow card) 18'; Meza 51'; Amorebieta (yellow card) 86'; Sánchez Miño (yellow card) 90+2'		Díaz (yellow card) 19'; Grillo (yellow card) 41'; Desábato (yellow card) 49'; Pérez Acuña (yellow card) 79'; Grillo (yellow card) 85' (yellow-red card); Cáseres (yellow card) 90+4'	Stadium: Estadio Libertadores de América; Referee: Facundo Tello

15 October 2017 6	Chacarita Juniors	1–2	Independiente	Villa Maipú
11:05 ART	Imbert 1'; Menéndez (yellow card) 69'; Mellado (yellow card) 90+4'		Bustos 10'; Barco 55'; Barco (yellow card) 90+3'	Stadium: Estadio de Chacarita Juniors; Referee: Fernando Echenique

29 October 2017 7	Independiente	1–1	Patronato	Avellaneda
20:05 ART	Silva (yellow card) 57'; Meza 89'		Márquez (yellow card) 17'; Rivero (yellow card) 30'; Ribas 34'; Arciero (yellow card) 40'; Sosa (yellow card) 74'; Urribarri (yellow card) 90'	Stadium: Estadio Libertadores de América; Referee: Juan Pablo Pompei

5 November 2017 8	Belgrano	0–0	Independiente	Córdoba
14:05 ART	Ramis (red card) 81'		Rodríguez (yellow card) 43'; Sánchez Miño (yellow card) 62'; Fernández (yellow card) 65'	Stadium: El Gigante de Alberdi; Referee: Mauro Vigliano

18 November 2017 9	Independiente	1–0	River Plate	Avellaneda
21:30 ART	Amorebieta (yellow card) 16'; Albertengo (yellow card) 56'; Gutiérrez (yellow card) 61'; Domingo 82'		Maidana (yellow card) 15'; Lux (red card) 20'; Pérez (yellow card) 73'	Stadium: Estadio Libertadores de América; Referee: Silvio Trucco

25 November 2017 10	Racing Club	0–1	Independiente	Avellaneda
21:30 ART	González (yellow card) 21'; Arévalo Ríos (yellow card) 25'; Saravia (yellow card) 45'; Martínez (yellow card) 90'		Moreira (yellow card) 27'; Fernández 30'; Moreira (yellow card) 36' (yellow-red card); Rehak (yellow card) 82'; Albil (yellow card) 90'	Stadium: Estadio Presidente Juan Domingo Perón; Referee: Germán Delfino

24 January 2018 (postponed) 11	Independiente	1–1	Rosario Central	Avellaneda
21:10 ART	Amorebieta (yellow card) 4'; Sánchez Miño (yellow card) 54'; Gigliotti 65'; Domingo (yellow card) 71'		Zampedri 35'; Parot (yellow card) 37'; Ledesma (yellow card) 63'; González (yellow card) 83'	Stadium: Estadio Libertadores de América; Referee: Ariel Penel

9 December 2017 12	Arsenal	1–2	Independiente	Sarandí
21:30 ART	Wilchez 80'; Monteseirín (yellow card) 82'		Fernández 18'; Denis 90'	Stadium: Estadio Julio Humberto Grondona; Referee: Federico Beligoy

29 January 2018 13	Independiente	1–2	Estudiantes de La Plata	Avellaneda
21:15 ART	Gigliotti 51'; Domingo (yellow card) 69'		Giménez (yellow card) 27'; Sánchez (yellow card) 29'; Campi (yellow card) 45'; Gómez 60'; Braña (yellow card) 66'; Otero 72'; Campi (yellow card) 84' (yellow-red card)	Stadium: Estadio Libertadores de América; Referee: José Ignacio Baliño

3 February 2018 14	Colón	0–1	Independiente	Santa Fe
19:15 ART	Chancalay (yellow card) 32'; Ceballos (yellow card) 70'		Fernández 72' (pen.); Figal (yellow card) 81'	Stadium: Estadio Brigadier General Estanislao López; Referee: Fernando Echenique

4 April 2018 (postponed) 15	Independiente	0–1	San Lorenzo	Avellaneda
20:00 ART	Bustos (yellow card) 31'; Bustos (yellow card) 75' (yellow-red card); Amorebieta (yellow card) 85'; Franco (yellow card) 87'		Botta 15'; Díaz (yellow card) 39'; Caruzzo (yellow card) 41'; Botta (yellow card) 66'; Rojas (yellow card) 72'; Piris Da Motta (yellow card) 82'; Senesi (yellow card) 85'; Blandi (yellow card) 87'	Stadium: Estadio Libertadores de América; Referee: Patricio Lousteau

17 February 2018 16	Temperley	0–0	Independiente	Temperley
19:15 ART	Scifo (yellow card) 14'; Bogino (yellow card) 50'; Nani (red card) 70'		Figal (yellow card) 38'	Stadium: Estadio Alfredo Beranger; Referee: Diego Abal

25 February 2018 17	Independiente	1–0	Banfield	Avellaneda
17:00 ART	Benítez 24'; Fernández (yellow card) 63'; Sánchez Miño (yellow card) 81'		Remedi (yellow card) 56'; Remedi (yellow card) 85' (yellow-red card); Ortiz (yellow card) 87'; Bertolo (yellow card) 90'	Stadium: Estadio Libertadores de América; Referee: Facundo Tello

5 March 2018 18	San Martín de San Juan	0–4	Independiente	San Juan
19:00 ART	Rodríguez (yellow card) 17'; Goitía (yellow card) 39'; Maná (yellow card) 50'; Fernández (yellow card) 73'; Goitía (yellow card) 76' (yellow-red card)		Benítez 16'; Gutiérrez (yellow card) 35'; Fernández (yellow card) 40'; Bustos 51'; Fernández 53'; Gigliotti (yellow card) 63'; B. Romero 81'	Stadium: Estadio del Bicentenario; Referee: Germán Delfino

11 March 2018 19	Independiente	2–1	Argentinos Juniors	Avellaneda
21:30 ART	Gigliotti 20'; Meza 42'		K. Mac Allister (yellow card) 17'; Montero (yellow card) 52'; Barrios 87'	Stadium: Estadio Libertadores de América; Referee: Silvio Trucco

19 March 2018 20	Tigre	1–1	Independiente	Victoria
21:15 ART	Pérez García (yellow card) 39'; Menossi (yellow card) 42'; González 73'		Menéndez (yellow card) 23'; S. Romero 32'; Figal (yellow card) 39'; Gutiérrez (yellow card) 59'; Franco (yellow card) 61'	Stadium: Estadio José Dellagiovanna; Referee: Fernando Rapallini

31 March 2018 21	Independiente	0–2	Atlético Tucumán	Avellaneda
20:00 ART	Fernández (yellow card) 88'; Gaibor (yellow card) 89'		García (yellow card) 29'; Acosta 54'; Aliendro (yellow card) 67'; Aliendro (yellow card) 81' (yellow-red card); Toledo (yellow card) 83'; Acosta 90+2'	Stadium: Estadio Libertadores de América; Referee: Fernando Echenique

8 April 2018 22	Talleres de Córdoba	0–2	Independiente	Córdoba
17:45 ART	Quintana (yellow card) 36'; Silva (yellow card) 60'; J. Ramírez (yellow card) 61'; Komar (yellow card) 76'	Report	Verón 23'; Amorebieta (yellow card) 57'; Sánchez Miño (yellow card) 62'; Brítez (yellow card) 78'; Gigliotti 89'	Stadium: Estadio Mario Alberto Kempes; Referee: Germán Delfino

15 April 2018 23	Independiente	1–0	Boca Juniors	Avellaneda
20:00 ART	Silva (yellow card) 37'; Fernández (yellow card) 50'; Benítez 56'	Report	Vergini (yellow card) 8'; Mas (yellow card) 78'; P. Pérez (yellow card) 81'; P. Pérez (yellow card) 90' (yellow-red card); Nández (yellow card) 90+2'	Stadium: Estadio Libertadores de América; Referee: Ariel Penel

23 April 2018 24	Independiente	0–1	Defensa y Justicia	Avellaneda
21:15 ART	Bustos (yellow card) 28'; Amorebieta (yellow card) 30'	Report	Molina (yellow card) 33'; Bareiro (yellow card) 51'; Bareiro 55'; Almeida (yellow card) 72'; Cubas (yellow card) 74'	Stadium: Estadio Libertadores de América; Referee: Hernán Mastrángelo

28 April 2018 25	Newell's Old Boys	0–1	Independiente	Rosario
15:30 ART	Bernardello (yellow card) 27'; San Román (yellow card) 48'; Cabrera (yellow card) 87'	Report	Franco (yellow card) 37'; Figal (yellow card) 40'; Silva 45'	Stadium: Estadio Marcelo Bielsa; Referee: Nicolás Lamolina

6 May 2018 26	Independiente	2–2	Gimnasia y Esgrima La Plata	Avellaneda
13:15 ART	Benítez 9'; Figal (red card) 20'; Rodríguez (yellow card) 29'; Bustos (yellow card) 59'; Gigliotti 78'	Report	Dibble (yellow card) 17'; Alemán 22' (pen.); Rinaudo (yellow card) 24'; Contín (yellow card) 81'; Bonifacio 90'	Stadium: Estadio Libertadores de América; Referee: Silvio Trucco

13 May 2018 27	Unión de Santa Fe	1–0	Independiente	Santa Fe
17:00 ART	Soldano 46'; M. Pittón (yellow card) 56'	Report	Franco (yellow card) 54'; Fernández (yellow card) 71'; Gaibor (yellow card) 82'; Campaña (yellow card) 87'; Amorebieta (yellow card) 90+4'	Stadium: Estadio 15 de Abril; Referee: Fernando Echenique

=== Copa Argentina ===
Win Draw Loss

==== Round of 64 ====
17 May 2017 R64	Independiente (Argentina)	0–0 (5–4 p)	(Argentina) Camioneros	Quilmes, Argentina
21:10 ART	Benítez (yellow card) 57'	Report		Stadium: Estadio Centenario Dr. José Luis Meiszner; Referee: Ariel Penel

==== Round of 32 ====
19 September 2017 (Note: Match was originally scheduled for 17 August 2017 before being postponed.) R32	Independiente (Argentina)	1–2	(Argentina) Atlético Tucumán	Mendoza, Argentina
21:10 ART	M. Meza 14'	Report	G. Freitas 57'; R. Aliendro 76'	Stadium: Estadio Malvinas Argentinas (Note: Original match was set to take place at the Estadio Ciudad de Lanús – Néstor Díaz Pérez.); Referee: Fernando Echenique (Argentina)

=== Copa Sudamericana ===
Win Draw Loss

==== First stage ====
4 April 2017 First leg	Independiente (Argentina)	0–0	(Peru) Alianza Lima	Avellaneda, Argentina
21:45 ART	Barco (yellow card) 26'	Report	de la Haza (yellow card) 18'; L. Ramírez (yellow card) 21'; Cossio (yellow card) 54'; Pacheco (yellow card) 75'	Stadium: Estadio Libertadores de América; Attendance: 23,000; Referee: Patricio Polic (Chile)

31 May 2017 Second leg	Alianza Lima (Peru)	0–1 (agg: 0–1)	(Argentina) Independiente	Lima, Peru
19:45 PET	Riojas (yellow card) 48'; Riojas (yellow card) 90' (yellow-red card)	Report	Rigoni 31'; Rigoni (yellow card) 67'	Stadium: Estadio Alejandro Villanueva; Attendance: 27,500; Referee: Anderson Daronco (Brazil)

==== Second stage ====
12 July 2017 First leg	Independiente (Argentina)	4–2	(Chile) Deportes Iquique	Avellaneda, Argentina
21:45 ART	Franco 21'; Barco 34'; Fernández 40'; Bustos (yellow card) 43'; Domínguez 44'; Meza (yellow card) 70'	Report	Charles (yellow card) 8'; Guerrero (yellow card) 27'; Bielkiewicz 75' (pen.); Torres (yellow card) 82'; Espinoza 90+1'	Stadium: Estadio Libertadores de América; Attendance: 28,200; Referee: Enrique Cáceres (Paraguay)

2 August 2017 Second leg	Deportes Iquique (Chile)	1–2 (agg: 3–6)	(Argentina) Independiente	Calama, Chile
20:45 CLT	Villalobos 7'; Torres (yellow card) 20'; Cubillos (yellow card) 88'	Report	Meza (yellow card) 17'; Barco (yellow card) 20'; Meza 27'; Franco (yellow card) 43'; Amorebieta (yellow card) 66'; Albertengo 81'	Stadium: Estadio Zorros del Desierto; Attendance: 4,500; Referee: Raphael Claus (Brazil)

==== Round of 16 ====
22 August 2017 First leg	Atlético Tucumán (Argentina)	1–0	(Argentina) Independiente	San Miguel de Tucumán, Argentina
21:45 ART	Núñez (yellow card) 32'; Rodríguez 43'; Cabral (yellow card) 71'; Sbuttoni (yellow card) 88'	Report	Amorebieta (yellow card) 77'; Meza (yellow card) 83'; Tagliafico (yellow card) 85'; Fernández (yellow card) 88'; Domínguez (yellow card) 90+4'	Stadium: Estadio Monumental José Fierro; Attendance: 30,000; Referee: Anderson Daronco (Brazil)

12 September 2017 Second leg	Independiente (Argentina)	2–0 (agg: 2–1)	(Argentina) Atlético Tucumán	Avellaneda, Argentina
21:45 ART	Fernández 17'; Tagliafico (yellow card) 20'; Sánchez Miño (yellow card) 40'; Tagliafico (yellow card) 52' (yellow-red card); Benítez 83'; Benítez (yellow card) 84'; Campaña (yellow card) 90+2'	Report	Miloc (yellow card) 30'; Aliendro (yellow card) 38'; Núñez (yellow card) 64'; Cabral (yellow card) 85'; Cabral (yellow card) 90+2' (yellow-red card)	Stadium: Estadio Libertadores de América; Attendance: 30,000; Referee: Andrés Cunha (Uruguay)

==== Quarter-finals ====
25 October 2017 First leg	Nacional (Paraguay)	1–4	(Argentina) Independiente	Asunción, Paraguay
19:15 PYT	Caballero 33'; Rojo (yellow card) 82'; Rojas (yellow card) 90+1'	Report	Meza 28'; Fernández 49', 70'; Albertengo 77'	Stadium: Estadio Defensores del Chaco; Attendance: 7,000; Referee: Leodán González (Uruguay)

2 November 2017 Second leg	Independiente (Argentina)	2–0 (agg: 6–1)	(Paraguay) Nacional	Avellaneda, Argentina
19:15 ART	Domingo (yellow card) 27'; Gigliotti (yellow card) 31'; Martínez 52'; Domingo (yellow card) 59'; Rodríguez (yellow card) 59'	Report	Roa Jiménez (yellow card) 21'; Salgueiro (yellow card) 40'; Canale (yellow card) 65'; Paniagua (yellow card) 80'; Rojo (yellow card) 83'	Stadium: Estadio Libertadores de América; Attendance: 34,408; Referee: Roddy Zambrano (Ecuador)

==== Semi-finals ====
21 November 2017 First leg	Libertad (Paraguay)	1–0	(Argentina) Independiente	Asunción, Paraguay
21:15 PYT	O. Cardozo 1'; Bareiro (yellow card) 44'; O. Cardozo (red card) 74'	Report	Domingo (yellow card) 45+2'; Barco (yellow card) 50'; Fernández (yellow card) 68'; Benítez (yellow card) 80'	Stadium: Estadio Defensores del Chaco; Attendance: 12,000; Referee: Víctor Carrillo (Peru)

28 November 2017 Second leg	Independiente (Argentina)	3–1 (agg: 3–2)	(Paraguay) Libertad	Avellaneda, Argentina
21:15 ART	Barco 17' (pen.); Gigliotti 19', 31'; Rodríguez (yellow card) 36'; Campaña (yellow card) 82'	Report	A. Cardozo 25'; L. Cardozo (yellow card) 45+1'	Stadium: Estadio Libertadores de América; Attendance: 44,350; Referee: Roddy Zambrano (Ecuador)

==== Finals ====
6 December 2017 First leg	Independiente (Argentina)	2–1	(Brazil) Flamengo	Avellaneda, Argentina
20:45 ART	Tagliafico (yellow card) 20'; Gigliotti 29'; Meza 53'; Amorebieta (yellow card) 86'; Campaña (yellow card) 90+1'	Report	Réver 9'; Diego (yellow card) 24'	Stadium: Estadio Libertadores de América; Attendance: 45,000; Referee: Mario Díaz de Vivar (Paraguay)

13 December 2017 Second leg	Flamengo (Brazil)	1–1 (agg: 2–3)	(Argentina) Independiente	Rio de Janeiro, Brazil
20:45 BRT	Paquetá 29'; Éverton (yellow card) 74'; Vinícius Jr. (yellow card) 78'; Juan (yellow card) 90+1'; Diego (yellow card) 90+2'; Cuéllar (red card) 90+4'	Report	Barco 38' (pen.); Albertengo (yellow card) 73'; Meza (yellow card) 78'; Campaña (yellow card) 80'; Barco (yellow card) 88'; Rodríguez (yellow card) 90+2'	Stadium: Estádio do Maracanã; Attendance: 62,657; Referee: Wilmar Roldán (Colombia)

=== Recopa Sudamericana ===
14 February 2018 First leg	Independiente (Argentina)	1–1	(Brazil) Grêmio	Avellaneda, Argentina
21:00 ART	Cortez 33' (o.g.); Gigliotti (red card) 22'; Domingo (yellow card) 45+3'; Fernández (yellow card) 70'; Amorebieta (yellow card) 90'	Report	Luan 22'; Moura (yellow card) 32'; Geromel (yellow card) 39'; Alisson (yellow card) 89'	Stadium: Estadio Libertadores de América; Attendance: 47,000; Referee: Roddy Zambrano (Ecuador)

21 February 2018 Second leg	Grêmio (Brazil)	0–0 (5–4 p)	(Argentina) Independiente	Porto Alegre, Brazil
21:45 BRT	Alisson (yellow card) 2'; Geromel (yellow card) 25'; Paulo Miranda (yellow card) 36'	Report	Rodríguez (yellow card) 16'; Silva (yellow card) 24'; Gaibor (yellow card) 35'; Amorebieta (red card) 42'	Stadium: Arena do Grêmio; Attendance: 42,291; Referee: Enrique Cáceres (Paraguay)

=== Copa Libertadores ===
==== Group stage ====
Pos	Team	Pld	W	D	L	GF	GA	GD	Pts	Qualification	COR	IND	MIL	LAR
1	(Brazil) Corinthians	6	3	1	2	11	5	+6	10	Round of 16	—	1–2	0–1	2–0
2	(Argentina) Independiente	6	3	1	2	6	4	+2	10	Round of 16	0–1	—	1–0	2–0
3	(Colombia) Millonarios	6	2	2	2	7	4	+3	8	Copa Sudamericana	0–0	1–1	—	4–0
4	(Venezuela) Deportivo Lara	6	2	0	4	5	16	−11	6		2–7	1–0	2–1	—

Source: CONMEBOL

1 March 2018 1	Deportivo Lara (Venezuela)	1–0	(Argentina) Independiente	Cabudare, Venezuela
18:15 UTC−4	Sierra 11'; Pernía (yellow card) 45+2'; Falcón (yellow card) 64'; Aponte (yellow card) 75'; Reyes (yellow card) 85'	Report	Domingo (yellow card) 62'; Meza (yellow card) 90+2'	Stadium: Estadio Metropolitano de Cabudare; Attendance: 5,100; Referee: Diego Haro (Peru)

15 March 2018 2	Independiente (Argentina)	1–0	(Colombia) Millonarios	Avellaneda, Argentina
21:30 UTC−3	Benítez 24'; Franco (yellow card) 70'; Sánchez Miño (yellow card) 79'	Report	Silva (yellow card) 40'	Stadium: Estadio Libertadores de América; Attendance: 5,100; Referee: Leodán González (Uruguay)

18 April 2018 3	Independiente (Argentina)	0–1	(Brazil) Corinthians	Avellaneda, Argentina
21:45 UTC−3	Verón (yellow card) 63'; Meza (yellow card) 90+3'; Bustos (yellow card) 90+4'	Report	Henrique (yellow card) 71'; Jádson 80'; Fagner (yellow card) 85'	Stadium: Estadio Libertadores de América; Referee: Daniel Fedorczuk (Uruguay)

2 May 2018 4	Corinthians (Brazil)	1–2	(Argentina) Independiente	São Paulo, Brazil
21:45 UTC−3	Jádson 31'; Emerson Sheik (red card) 79'	Report	Benítez 1'; Romero 24' (o.g.); Sánchez Miño (yellow card) 37'; Amorebieta (yellow card) 44'; Meza (yellow card) 75'; Romero (yellow card) 80'; Figal (yellow card) 88'	Stadium: Arena Corinthians; Attendance: 36,508; Referee: Víctor Carrillo (Peru)

17 May 2018 5	Millonarios (Colombia)	1–1	(Argentina) Independiente	Bogotá, Colombia
19:30 UTC−5	Cadavid 58' (pen.); Rojas (yellow card) 60'; Cadavid (yellow card) 62'	Report	B. Romero (yellow card) 23'; Franco (yellow card) 40'; Figal (yellow card) 62'; Gigliotti 74'; Gaibor (yellow card) 78'; Campaña (yellow card) 90+2'	Stadium: Estadio El Campín; Referee: Roberto Tobar (Chile)

24 May 2018 6	Independiente (Argentina)	2–0	(Venezuela) Deportivo Lara	Avellaneda, Argentina
21:30 UTC−3	Figal (yellow card) 13'; Benítez 37'; Silva (yellow card) 51'; Gigliotti 80'; Franco (yellow card) 83'	Report	Carrillo (yellow card) 29'; Carrillo (yellow card) 59' (yellow-red card); Falcón (yellow card) 83'; Soto (yellow card) 89'	Stadium: Estadio Libertadores de América; Referee: Éber Aquino (Paraguay)
