= 2017 Copa Sudamericana finals =

- Event: 2017 Copa Sudamericana
| Independiente | Flamengo |
| (Argentina) | (Brazil) |
| 3 | 2 |
- on aggregate

First leg
| Independiente | Flamengo |
| 2 | 1 |
- Date: 6 December 2017
- Venue: Estadio Libertadores de América, Avellaneda
- Referee: Mario Díaz de Vivar (Paraguay)
- Attendance: 45,000

Second leg
| Flamengo | Independiente |
| 1 | 1 |
- Date: 13 December 2017
- Venue: Estádio do Maracanã, Rio de Janeiro
- Referee: Wilmar Roldán (Colombia)
- Attendance: 62,567

The 2017 Copa Sudamericana finals were the two-legged final that decides the winner of the 2017 Copa Sudamericana, the 16th edition of the Copa Sudamericana, South America's secondary international club football tournament organized by CONMEBOL.

The finals were contested in two-legged home-and-away format between Argentinian team Independiente and Brazilian team Flamengo. The first leg was hosted by Independiente at Estadio Libertadores de América in Avellaneda on 6 December 2017, while the second leg was hosted by Flamengo at Estádio do Maracanã in Rio de Janeiro on 13 December 2017.

Independiente defeated Flamengo 3–2 on aggregate to win their second Copa Sudamericana title. As champions, Independiente earned the right to play against the winners of the 2017 Copa Libertadores in the 2018 Recopa Sudamericana, and the winners of the 2017 J.League Cup in the 2018 Suruga Bank Championship. They also automatically qualified for the 2018 Copa Libertadores group stage.

== Teams ==
| Team | Previous finals appearances (bold indicates winners) |
|---|---|
| (Argentina) Independiente | 1 (**2010**) |
| (Brazil) Flamengo | None |

== Venues ==
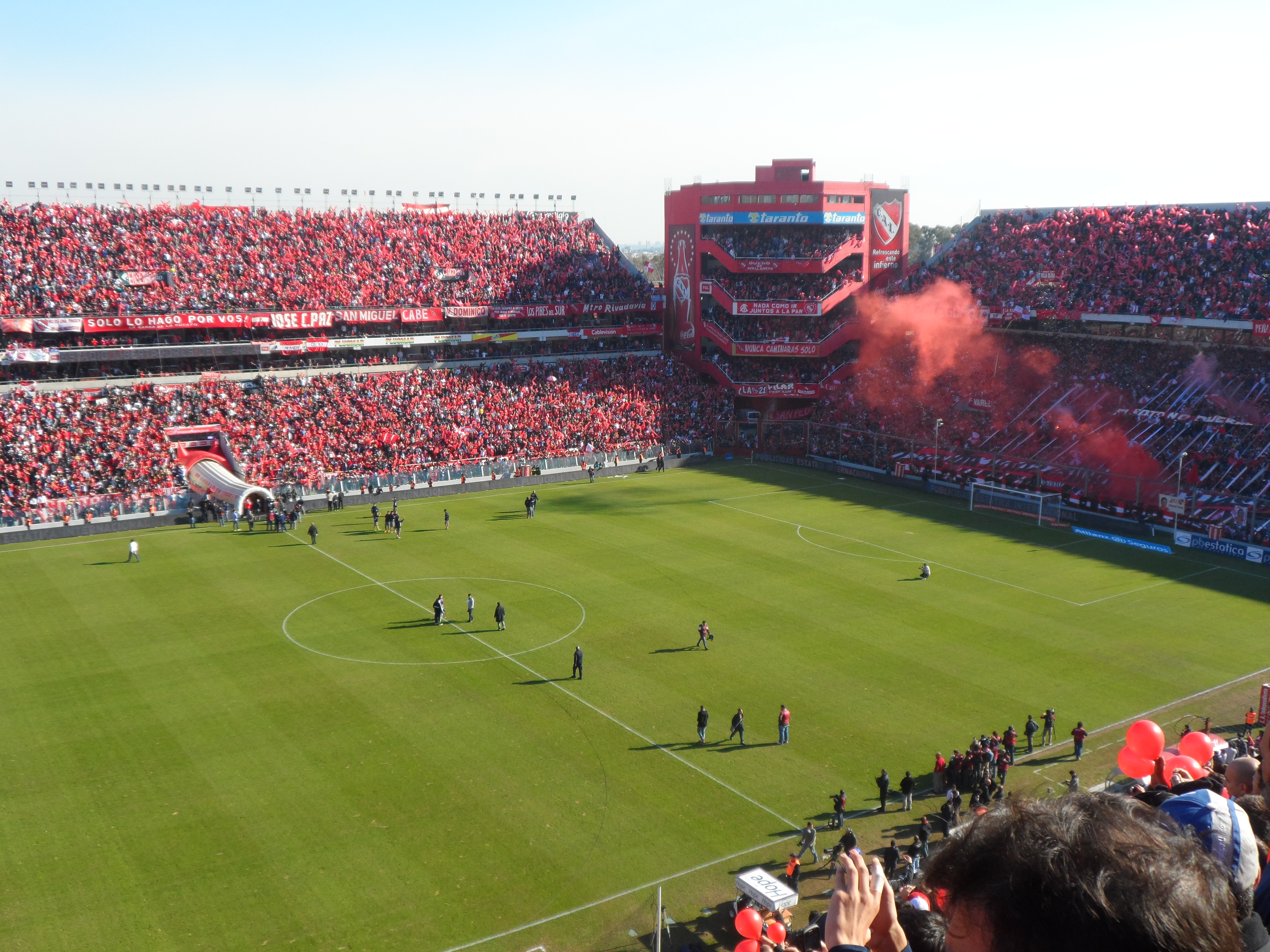
Estadio Libertadores de América in Avellaneda, Argentina, hosted the first leg.

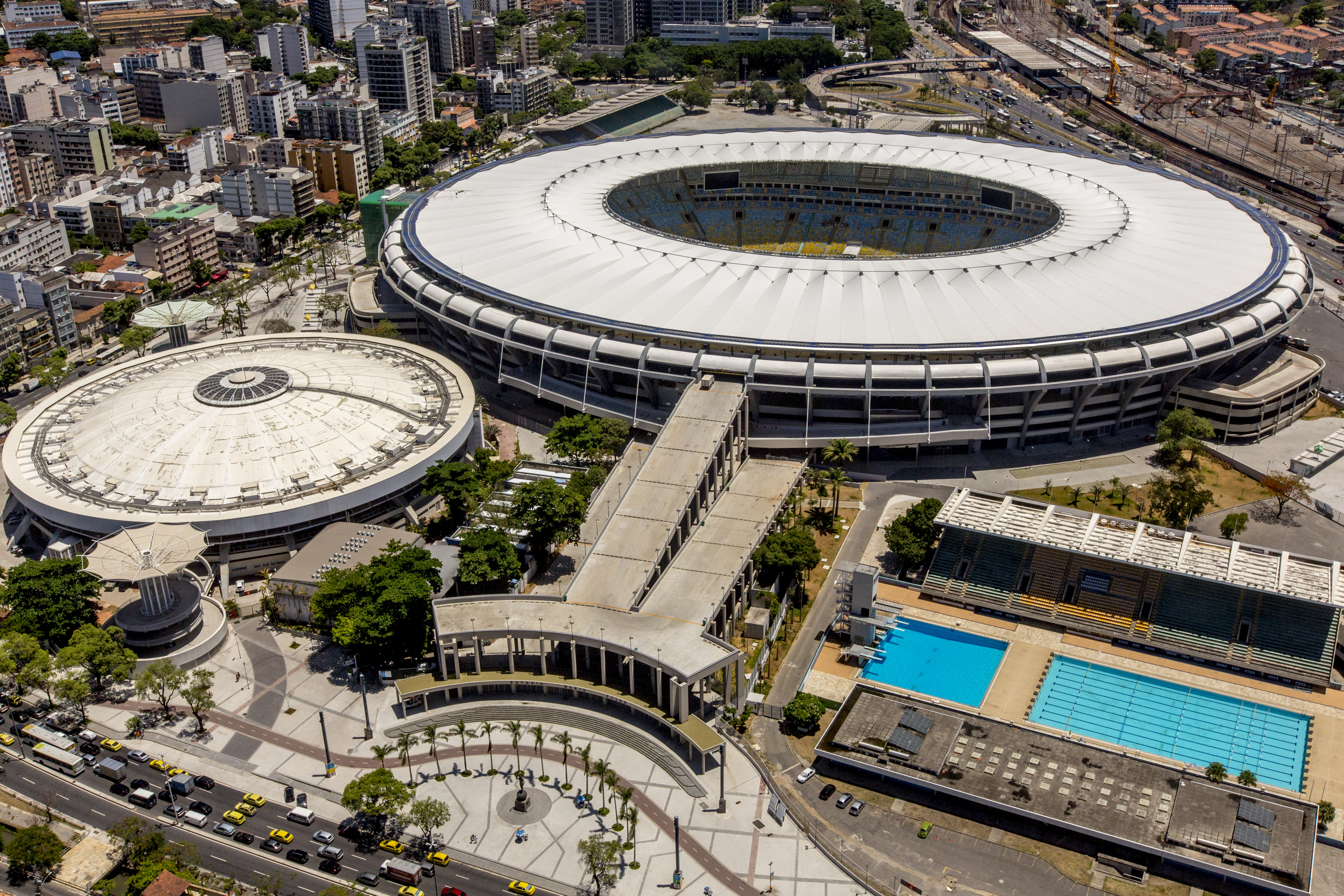
Estádio do Maracanã in Rio de Janeiro, Brazil, hosted the second leg.

== Road to the final ==
| (Argentina) Independiente | | | Round | (Brazil) Flamengo | | |
|---|---|---|---|---|---|---|
| Opponent | Venue | Score | **Elimination** | Opponent | Venue | Score |
| (Peru) Alianza Lima (won 1–0 on aggregate) | Home | 0–0 | First stage | Automatically advanced to Second stage | | |
| (Peru) Alianza Lima (won 1–0 on aggregate) | Away | 0–1 | First stage | Automatically advanced to Second stage | | |
| (Chile) Deportes Iquique (won 6–3 on aggregate) | Home | 4–2 | Second stage | (Chile) Palestino (won 10–2 on aggregate) | Away | 2–5 |
| (Chile) Deportes Iquique (won 6–3 on aggregate) | Away | 1–2 | Second stage | (Chile) Palestino (won 10–2 on aggregate) | Home | 5–0 |
| **Seed 5** | | | final stages | **Seed 3** | | |
| (Argentina) Atlético Tucumán (won 2–1 on aggregate) | Away | 1–0 | Round of 16 | (Brazil) Chapecoense (won 4–0 on aggregate) | Away | 0–0 |
| (Argentina) Atlético Tucumán (won 2–1 on aggregate) | Home | 2–0 | Round of 16 | (Brazil) Chapecoense (won 4–0 on aggregate) | Home | 4–0 |
| (Paraguay) Nacional (won 6–1 on aggregate) | Away | 1–4 | Quarterfinals | (Brazil) Fluminense (won 4–3 on aggregate) | Away | 0–1 |
| (Paraguay) Nacional (won 6–1 on aggregate) | Home | 2–0 | Quarterfinals | (Brazil) Fluminense (won 4–3 on aggregate) | Home | 3–3 |
| (Paraguay) Libertad (won 3–2 on aggregate) | Away | 1–0 | Semifinals | (Colombia) Junior (won 4–1 on aggregate) | Home | 2–1 |
| (Paraguay) Libertad (won 3–2 on aggregate) | Home | 3–1 | Semifinals | (Colombia) Junior (won 4–1 on aggregate) | Away | 0–2 |

== Format ==
The finals were played on a home-and-away two-legged basis, with the higher-seeded team hosting the second leg. If tied on aggregate, the away goals rule would not be used, and 30 minutes of extra time would be played. If still tied after extra time, the penalty shoot-out would be used to determine the winner. If extra time was played, a fourth substitution would be allowed.

== Matches ==
Paolo Guerrero (Flamengo), provisionally suspended for failing doping test, missed the first leg. On 7 December 2017, the FIFA Disciplinary Committee decided to suspend Guerrero for one year, missing the second leg. After the finals, FIFA Appeal Committee reduced the sanction to a six-month suspension.

=== First leg ===
Flamengo scored after eight minutes when Réver headed a free kick from Trauco. Independiente equalized through Emmanuel Gigliotti, who combined with Benitez and finished a counter attack. Seven minutes after halftime, Barco crossed from the left side and Maximiliano Meza scored the winning goal with a right-footed volley.

6 December 2017
20:45 UTC−3

| Independiente (Argentina) | 2–1 | (Brazil) Flamengo |
|---|---|---|
| Gigliotti 28'; Meza 52' | Report | Réver 8' |

Estadio Libertadores de América, Avellaneda
Attendance: 45,000
Referee: Mario Díaz de Vivar (Paraguay)

| **Independiente** | **Flamengo** |

| GK | 25 | (Uruguay) Martín Campaña |
| RB | 16 | (Argentina) Fabricio Bustos | (yellow card) 90' |
| CB | 2 | (Argentina) Alan Franco | | (substituted off) 84' |
| CB | 5 | (Uruguay) Gastón Silva |
| LB | 3 | (Argentina) Nicolás Tagliafico (c) | (yellow card) 19' |
| CM | 15 | (Uruguay) Diego Martín Rodríguez |
| CM | 6 | (Argentina) Juan Sánchez Miño |
| RW | 7 | (Argentina) Martín Benítez | | (substituted off) 72' |
| AM | 8 | (Argentina) Maximiliano Meza | | (substituted off) 78' |
| LW | 27 | (Argentina) Ezequiel Barco |
| CF | 9 | (Argentina) Emmanuel Gigliotti |
Substitutes:
| GK | 1 | (Argentina) Damián Albil |
| DF | 14 | (Venezuela) Fernando Amorebieta | (yellow card) 85' | (substituted on) 84' |
| MF | 10 | (Argentina) Walter Erviti |
| MF | 23 | (Argentina) Nery Domínguez |
| MF | 29 | (Argentina) Nicolás Domingo | | (substituted on) 78' |
| FW | 11 | (Argentina) Leandro Fernández |
| FW | 24 | (Argentina) Juan Manuel Martínez | | (substituted on) 72' |
Manager:
(Argentina) Ariel Holan

| GK | 24 | (Brazil) César |
| RB | 21 | (Brazil) Pará |
| CB | 15 | (Brazil) Réver (c) |
| CB | 4 | (Brazil) Juan |
| LB | 13 | (Peru) Miguel Trauco |
| CM | 5 | (Brazil) Willian Arão |
| CM | 26 | (Colombia) Gustavo Cuéllar |
| RW | 7 | (Brazil) Éverton Ribeiro |
| AM | 10 | (Brazil) Diego | (yellow card) 23' | (substituted off) 72' |
| LW | 29 | (Brazil) Lucas Paquetá | | (substituted off) 56' |
| CF | 25 | (Brazil) Felipe Vizeu |
Substitutes:
| GK | 1 | (Brazil) Thiago |
| DF | 2 | (Brazil) Rodinei |
| DF | 30 | (Brazil) Rhodolfo |
| MF | 8 | (Brazil) Márcio Araújo |
| MF | 22 | (Brazil) Éverton | | (substituted on) 56' |
| MF | 27 | (Brazil) Rômulo |
| FW | 20 | (Brazil) Vinícius Júnior | | (substituted on) 72' |
Manager:
(Colombia) Reinaldo Rueda

Assistant referees:
Milcíades Saldívar (Paraguay)
Darío Gaona (Paraguay)
Fourth official:
Éber Aquino (Paraguay)
VAR:
Enrique Cáceres (Paraguay)
AVAR:
Roddy Zambrano (Ecuador)
VAR2:
Eduardo Cardozo (Paraguay)

=== Second leg ===
Lucas Paquetá opened the scoring meters away from the line in the 29th minute after a low cross from Réver. Ten minutes later, Independiente were awarded a penalty for a foul on Meza by Cuéllar. Ezequiel Barco scored to tie the match.

13 December 2017
21:45 UTC−2

| Flamengo (Brazil) | 1–1 | (Argentina) Independiente |
|---|---|---|
| Lucas Paquetá 29' | Report | Barco 39' (pen.) |

Estádio do Maracanã, Rio de Janeiro
Attendance: 62,567
Referee: Wilmar Roldán (Colombia)

| **Flamengo** | **Independiente** |

| GK | 24 | (Brazil) César |
| RB | 21 | (Brazil) Pará |
| CB | 15 | (Brazil) Réver (c) |
| CB | 4 | (Brazil) Juan | (yellow card) 90' |
| LB | 13 | (Peru) Miguel Trauco | | (substituted off) 54' |
| CM | 5 | (Brazil) Willian Arão |
| CM | 26 | (Colombia) Gustavo Cuéllar | | (substituted off) 78' |
| RW | 29 | (Brazil) Lucas Paquetá | | (substituted off) 84' |
| AM | 10 | (Brazil) Diego |
| LW | 22 | (Brazil) Éverton | (yellow card) 73' |
| CF | 25 | (Brazil) Felipe Vizeu |
Substitutes:
| GK | 1 | (Brazil) Thiago |
| DF | 2 | (Brazil) Rodinei |
| DF | 30 | (Brazil) Rhodolfo |
| MF | 7 | (Brazil) Éverton Ribeiro | | (substituted on) 78' |
| MF | 8 | (Brazil) Márcio Araújo |
| FW | 16 | (Brazil) Lincoln | | (substituted on) 84' |
| FW | 20 | (Brazil) Vinícius Júnior | (yellow card) 77' | (substituted on) 54' |
Manager:
(Colombia) Reinaldo Rueda

| GK | 25 | (Uruguay) Martín Campaña | (yellow card) 79' |
| RB | 16 | (Argentina) Fabricio Bustos | | (substituted off) 84' |
| CB | 2 | (Argentina) Alan Franco |
| CB | 14 | (Venezuela) Fernando Amorebieta |
| LB | 3 | (Argentina) Nicolás Tagliafico (c) |
| CM | 29 | (Argentina) Nicolás Domingo |
| CM | 15 | (Uruguay) Diego Martín Rodríguez |
| RW | 7 | (Argentina) Martín Benítez | | (substituted off) 33' |
| AM | 8 | (Argentina) Maximiliano Meza | (yellow card) 77' | (substituted off) 82' |
| LW | 27 | (Argentina) Ezequiel Barco | (yellow card) 87' |
| CF | 9 | (Argentina) Emmanuel Gigliotti |
Substitutes:
| GK | 1 | (Argentina) Damián Albil |
| DF | 5 | (Uruguay) Gastón Silva | | (substituted on) 84' |
| MF | 6 | (Argentina) Juan Sánchez Miño | | (substituted on) 82' |
| MF | 10 | (Argentina) Walter Erviti |
| MF | 23 | (Argentina) Nery Domínguez |
| FW | 11 | (Argentina) Leandro Fernández |
| FW | 18 | (Argentina) Lucas Albertengo | (yellow card) 72' | (substituted on) 33' |
Manager:
(Argentina) Ariel Holan

Assistant referees:
Alexander Guzmán (Colombia)
Cristian de la Cruz (Colombia)
Fourth official:
Gustavo Murillo (Colombia)
VAR:
Daniel Fedorczuk (Uruguay)
AVAR:
Roberto Tobar (Chile)
VAR2:
Nicolás Tarán (Uruguay)

== See also ==
- 2017 Copa Libertadores finals
- 2018 Recopa Sudamericana
- 2018 Suruga Bank Championship
