= 2018 Recopa Sudamericana =

CONMEBOL Recopa 2018
- Event: Recopa Sudamericana
Independiente	Grêmio
(Argentina)	(Brazil)
1	1
- on aggregate Grêmio won 5–4 on penalties

First leg
Independiente	Grêmio
1	1
- Date: 14 February 2018
- Venue: Estadio Libertadores de América, Avellaneda
- Referee: Roddy Zambrano (Ecuador)
- Attendance: 47,000

Second leg
Grêmio	Independiente
0	0
- After extra time
- Date: 21 February 2018
- Venue: Arena do Grêmio, Porto Alegre
- Referee: Enrique Cáceres (Paraguay)
- Attendance: 42,921

The 2018 CONMEBOL Recopa was the 26th edition of the CONMEBOL Recopa (also referred to as the Recopa Sudamericana, or Portuguese: Recopa Sul-Americana), the football competition organized by CONMEBOL between the winners of the previous season's two major South American club tournaments, the Copa Libertadores and the Copa Sudamericana.

The competition was contested in two-legged home-and-away format between Brazilian team Grêmio, the 2017 Copa Libertadores champions, and Argentinian team Independiente, the 2017 Copa Sudamericana champions. The first leg was hosted by Independiente at Estadio Libertadores de América in Avellaneda on 14 February 2018, while the second leg was hosted by Grêmio at Arena do Grêmio in Porto Alegre on 21 February 2018.

Tied 1–1 on aggregate, Grêmio won 5–4 on penalties to win their second Recopa Sudamericana title.

== Format ==
The Recopa Sudamericana was played on a home-and-away two-legged basis, with the Copa Libertadores champions hosting the second leg. If tied on aggregate, the away goals rule would not be used, and 30 minutes of extra time would be played. If still tied after extra time, the penalty shoot-out would be used to determine the winner. If extra time was played, a fourth substitution would be allowed.

== Teams ==
Team	Qualification	Previous app.
(Brazil) Grêmio	2017 Copa Libertadores champions	1 (**1996**)
(Argentina) Independiente	2017 Copa Sudamericana champions	3 (**1995**, 1996, 2011)

Bold indicates winning years

== Venues ==
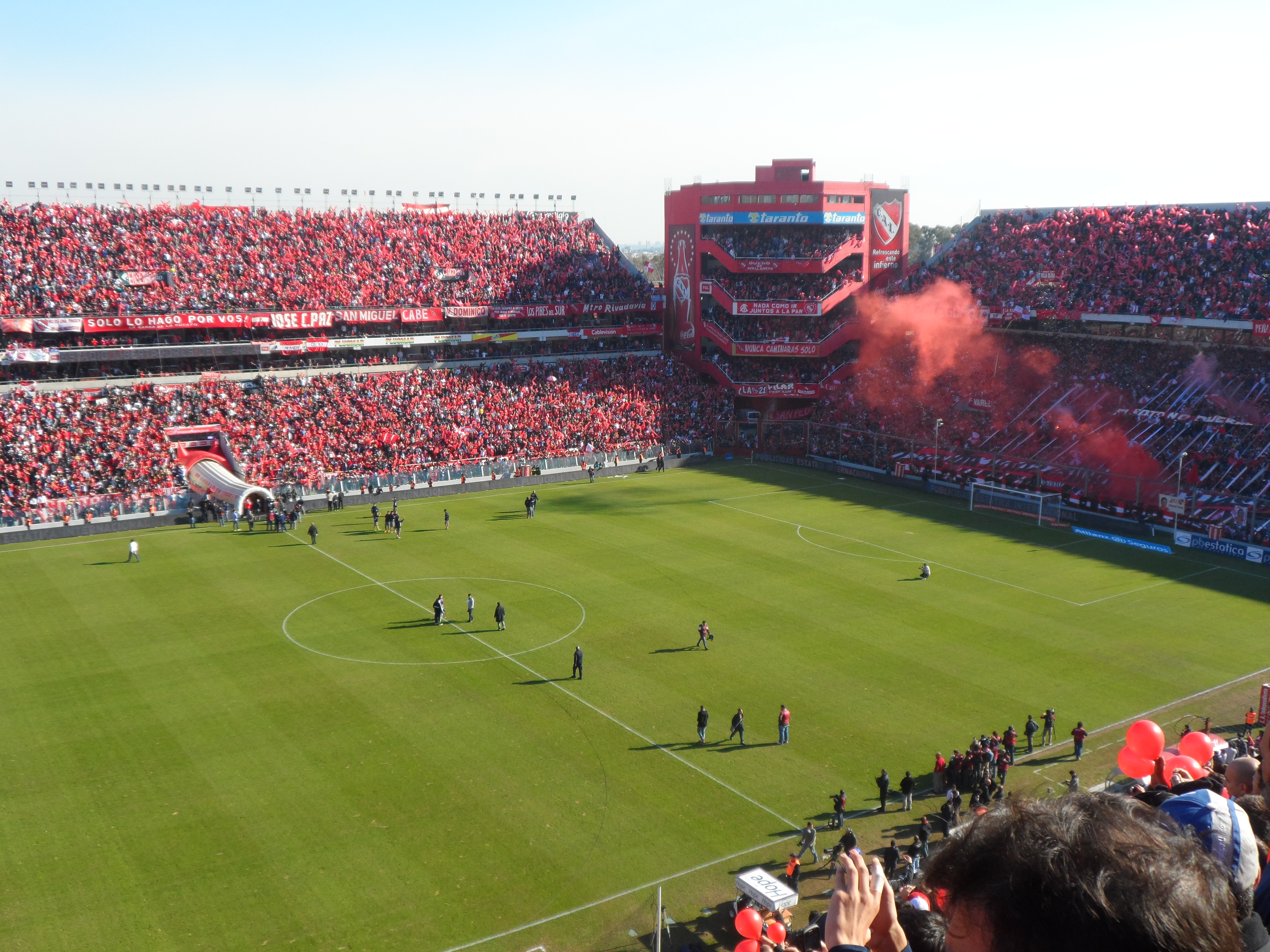
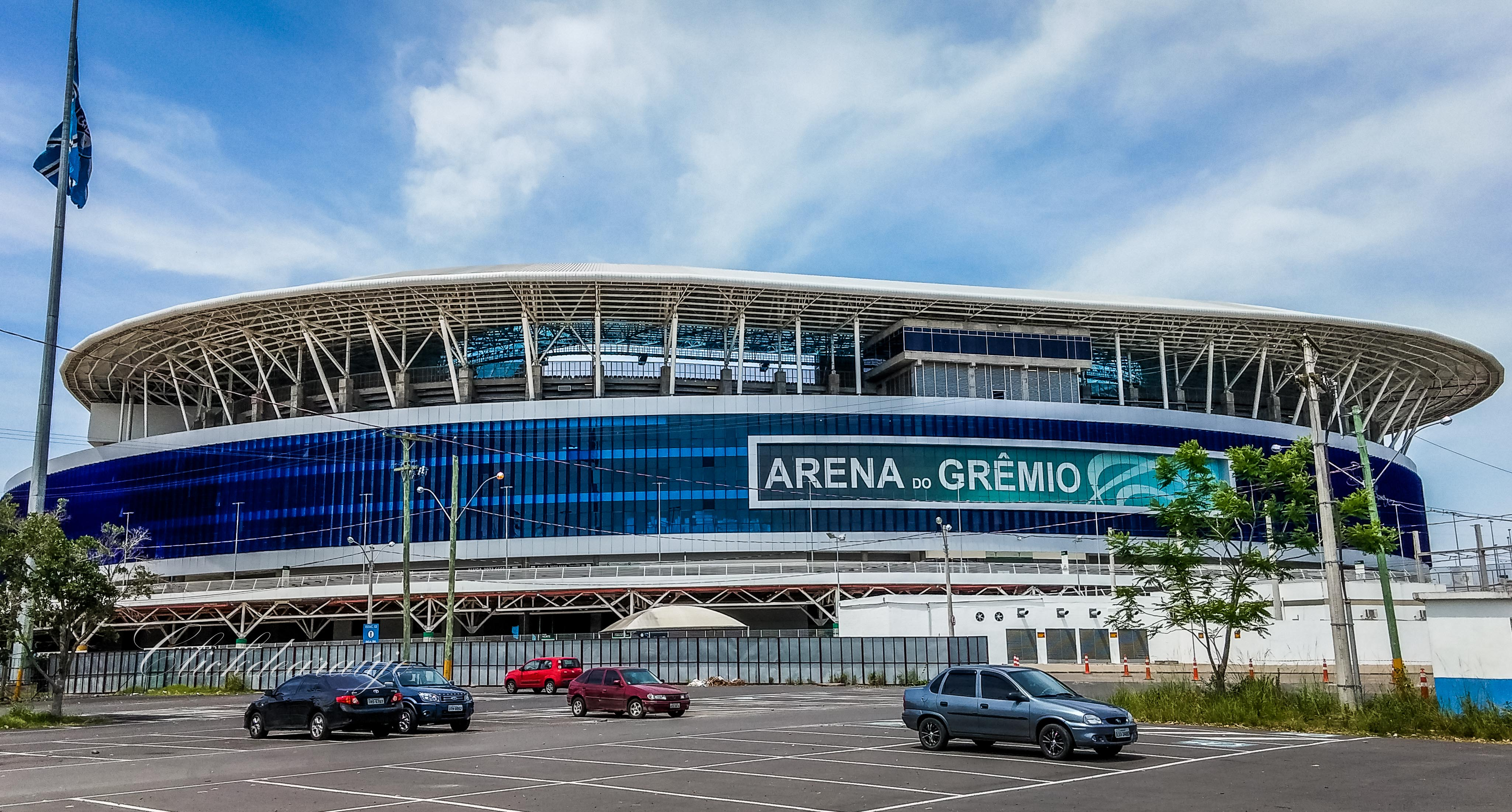
Estadio Libertadores de América in Avellaneda (left) and Arena do Grêmio in Porto Alegre, hosted the series.

== Matches ==
=== First leg ===
14 February 2018
21:00 UTC−3
First leg

Independiente (Argentina)	1–1	(Brazil) Grêmio
Cortez 33' (o.g.)	Report	Luan 21'

Estadio Libertadores de América, Avellaneda
Attendance: 47,000
Referee: Roddy Zambrano (Ecuador)

**Independiente**	**Grêmio**

GK	25	(Uruguay) Martín Campaña (c)
RB	16	(Argentina) Fabricio Bustos		(substituted off) 83'
CB	2	(Argentina) Alan Franco
CB	14	(Venezuela) Fernando Amorebieta	(yellow card) 90'
LB	20	(Uruguay) Gastón Silva
CM	5	(Argentina) Nicolás Domingo	(yellow card) 45+3'
CM	10	(Ecuador) Fernando Gaibor		(substituted off) 67'
RW	7	(Argentina) Martín Benítez		(substituted off) 64'
AM	8	(Argentina) Maximiliano Meza
LW	21	(Argentina) Jonathan Menéndez
CF	9	(Argentina) Emmanuel Gigliotti	(red card) 28'
Substitutes:
GK	1	(Argentina) Damián Albil
DF	4	(Argentina) Jorge Figal		(substituted on) 83'
MF	6	(Argentina) Juan Sánchez Miño
MF	24	(Argentina) Jonás Gutiérrez		(substituted on) 67'
FW	11	(Argentina) Leandro Fernández	(yellow card) 70'	(substituted on) 64'
FW	18	(Argentina) Silvio Romero
FW	22	(Argentina) Juan Manuel Martínez
Manager:
(Argentina) Ariel Holan

GK	1	(Brazil) Marcelo Grohe
RB	2	(Brazil) Léo Moura	(yellow card) 32'
CB	3	(Brazil) Pedro Geromel	(yellow card) 39'
CB	4	(Argentina) Walter Kannemann
LB	6	(Brazil) Bruno Cortez
DM	25	(Brazil) Jailson
RM	14	(Brazil) Lima		(substituted off) 53'
CM	8	(Brazil) Maicon (c)
CM	17	(Brazil) Cícero		(substituted off) 85'
LM	11	(Brazil) Éverton		(substituted off) 85'
CF	7	(Brazil) Luan
Substitutes:
GK	12	(Brazil) Paulo Victor
DF	20	(Brazil) Marcelo Oliveira
DF	22	(Brazil) Bressan
MF	5	(Brazil) Michel
MF	18	(Brazil) Maicosuel		(substituted on) 85'
MF	23	(Brazil) Alisson	(yellow card) 89'	(substituted on) 53'
FW	9	(Brazil) Jael		(substituted on) 85'
Manager:
(Brazil) Renato Portaluppi

Assistant referees:
Byron Romero (Ecuador)
Christian Lescano (Ecuador)
Fourth official:
Luis Quiroz (Ecuador)
Video assistant referee:
Mario Díaz de Vivar (Paraguay)
Milcíades Saldívar (Paraguay)
Assistant video assistant referee:
Gery Vargas (Bolivia)

=== Second leg ===
21 February 2018
21:45 UTC−3
Second leg

Grêmio (Brazil)	0–0 (a.e.t.)	(Argentina) Independiente
	Report
Penalties
Maicon (penalty scored); Cícero (penalty scored); Jael (penalty scored); Éverton (penalty scored); Luan (penalty scored)	5–4	(penalty scored) Gaibor; (penalty scored) Meza; (penalty scored) Domingo; (penalty scored) Romero; (penalty missed) Benítez

Arena do Grêmio, Porto Alegre
Attendance: 42,921
Referee: Enrique Cáceres (Paraguay)

**Grêmio**	**Independiente**

GK	1	(Brazil) Marcelo Grohe
RB	2	(Brazil) Léo Moura		(substituted off) 22'
CB	3	(Brazil) Pedro Geromel	(yellow card) 25'
CB	4	(Argentina) Walter Kannemann
LB	6	(Brazil) Bruno Cortez		(substituted off) 116'
CM	8	(Brazil) Maicon (c)
CM	25	(Brazil) Jailson		(substituted off) 62'
RW	23	(Brazil) Alisson	(yellow card) 2'	(substituted off) 81'
AM	7	(Brazil) Luan
LW	11	(Brazil) Éverton
CF	17	(Brazil) Cícero
Substitutes:
GK	12	(Brazil) Paulo Victor
DF	13	(Brazil) Paulo Miranda	(yellow card) 36'	(substituted on) 22'
DF	20	(Brazil) Marcelo Oliveira
MF	5	(Brazil) Michel
MF	14	(Brazil) Lima		(substituted on) 116'
MF	18	(Brazil) Maicosuel		(substituted on) 81'
FW	9	(Brazil) Jael		(substituted on) 62'
Manager:
(Brazil) Renato Portaluppi

GK	25	(Uruguay) Martín Campaña (c)
RB	16	(Argentina) Fabricio Bustos		(substituted off) 108'
CB	2	(Argentina) Alan Franco
CB	14	(Venezuela) Fernando Amorebieta	(red card) 42'
LB	20	(Uruguay) Gastón Silva	(yellow card) 24'
CM	15	(Uruguay) Diego Martín Rodríguez	(yellow card) 16'	(substituted off) 46'
CM	5	(Argentina) Nicolás Domingo
RW	8	(Argentina) Maximiliano Meza
AM	10	(Ecuador) Fernando Gaibor	(yellow card) 35'
LW	21	(Argentina) Jonathan Menéndez		(substituted off) 75'
CF	11	(Argentina) Leandro Fernández		(substituted off) 45'
Substitutes:
GK	1	(Argentina) Damián Albil
DF	4	(Argentina) Jorge Figal		(substituted on) 45'
MF	6	(Argentina) Juan Sánchez Miño
MF	7	(Argentina) Martín Benítez		(substituted on) 46'
MF	24	(Argentina) Jonás Gutiérrez		(substituted on) 108'
FW	18	(Argentina) Silvio Romero		(substituted on) 75'
FW	22	(Argentina) Juan Manuel Martínez
Manager:
(Argentina) Ariel Holan

Assistant referees:
Eduardo Cardozo (Paraguay)
Juan Zorrilla (Paraguay)
Fourth official:
Éber Aquino (Paraguay)
Video assistant referee:
Andrés Cunha (Uruguay)
Nicolás Tarán (Uruguay)
Assistant video assistant referee:
José Argote (Venezuela)

== See also ==
- 2018 Copa Libertadores Finals
- 2018 Copa Sudamericana Finals
