= 2017 Copa Sudamericana final stages =

The 2017 Copa Sudamericana final stages was played from 22 August to 13 December 2017. A total of 16 teams competed in the final stages to decide the champions of the 2017 Copa Sudamericana.

== Qualified teams ==
The 16 winners of the second stage advanced to the round of 16. Starting from the round of 16, the teams were seeded according to the second stage draw, with each team assigned a "seed" 1–16 corresponding to the tie they won (O1–O16).

Seed	Match	Second stage winners
1	O1	(Argentina) Racing
2	O2	(Colombia) Junior
3	O3	(Brazil) Flamengo
4	O4	(Argentina) Estudiantes
5	O5	(Argentina) Independiente
6	O6	(Ecuador) LDU Quito
7	O7	(Brazil) Ponte Preta
8	O8	(Colombia) Santa Fe
9	O9	(Paraguay) Libertad
10	O10	(Brazil) Sport Recife
11	O11	(Brazil) Fluminense
12	O12	(Argentina) Atlético Tucumán
13	O13	(Paraguay) Nacional
14	O14	(Brazil) Chapecoense
15	O15	(Paraguay) Cerro Porteño
16	O16	(Brazil) Corinthians

== Format ==
Starting from the round of 16, the teams played a single-elimination tournament with the following rules:

- Each tie was played on a home-and-away two-legged basis, with the higher-seeded team hosting the second leg (Regulations Article 4.12).
- In the round of 16, quarterfinals, and semifinals, if tied on aggregate, the away goals rule would be used. If still tied, extra time would not be played, and the penalty shoot-out would be used to determine the winner (Regulations Article 6.1).
- In the finals, if tied on aggregate, the away goals rule would not be used, and 30 minutes of extra time would be played. If still tied after extra time, the penalty shoot-out would be used to determine the winner (Regulations Article 6.2).

== Bracket ==
The bracket starting from the round of 16 was determined as follows:

Round	Matchups
Round of 16	(Higher-seeded team host second leg): Match A: Winner O1 vs. Winner O16; Match B: Winner O2 vs. Winner O15; Match C: Winner O3 vs. Winner O14; Match D: Winner O4 vs. Winner O13; Match E: Winner O5 vs. Winner O12; Match F: Winner O6 vs. Winner O11; Match G: Winner O7 vs. Winner O10; Match H: Winner O8 vs. Winner O9
Quarterfinals	(Higher-seeded team host second leg): Match S1: Winner A vs. Winner H; Match S2: Winner B vs. Winner G; Match S3: Winner C vs. Winner F; Match S4: Winner D vs. Winner E
Semifinals	(Higher-seeded team host second leg): Match F1: Winner S1 vs. Winner S4; Match F2: Winner S2 vs. Winner S3
Finals	(Higher-seeded team host second leg): Winner F1 vs. Winner F2

The bracket was decided based on the second stage draw, which was held on 14 June 2017.

Round of 16
9	(Paraguay) Libertad	1	1	2
8	(Colombia) Santa Fe	0	1	1
16	(Brazil) Corinthians	1	0	1
1	(Argentina) Racing (a)	1	0	1
13	(Paraguay) Nacional	1	1	2
4	(Argentina) Estudiantes	0	0	0
12	(Argentina) Atlético Tucumán	1	0	1
5	(Argentina) Independiente	0	2	2
11	(Brazil) Fluminense (a)	1	1	2
6	(Ecuador) LDU Quito	0	2	2
14	(Brazil) Chapecoense	0	0	0
3	(Brazil) Flamengo	0	4	4
10	(Brazil) Sport Recife	3	0	3
7	(Brazil) Ponte Preta	1	1	2
15	(Paraguay) Cerro Porteño	0	1	1
2	(Colombia) Junior	0	3	3

Quarterfinals
9	(Paraguay) Libertad	1	0	1
1	(Argentina) Racing	0	0	0
13	(Paraguay) Nacional	1	0	1
5	(Argentina) Independiente	4	2	6
11	(Brazil) Fluminense	0	3	3
3	(Brazil) Flamengo	1	3	4
10	(Brazil) Sport Recife	0	0	0
2	(Colombia) Junior	2	0	2

Semifinals
9	(Paraguay) Libertad	1	1	2
5	(Argentina) Independiente	0	3	3
3	(Brazil) Flamengo	2	2	4
2	(Colombia) Junior	1	0	1

Finals
5	(Argentina) Independiente	2	1	3
3	(Brazil) Flamengo	1	1	2

== Round of 16 ==
The first legs were played on 22–24 August and 12–14 September, and the second legs were played on 12, 14 and 19–21 September 2017.

Team 1	Agg.	Team 2	1st leg	2nd leg
Corinthians (Brazil)	1–1 (a)	(Argentina) Racing	1–1	0–0
Cerro Porteño (Paraguay)	1–3	(Colombia) Junior	0–0	1–3
Chapecoense (Brazil)	0–4	(Brazil) Flamengo	0–0	0–4
Nacional (Paraguay)	2–0	(Argentina) Estudiantes	1–0	1–0
Atlético Tucumán (Argentina)	1–2	(Argentina) Independiente	1–0	0–2
Fluminense (Brazil)	2–2 (a)	(Ecuador) LDU Quito	1–0	1–2
Sport Recife (Brazil)	3–2	(Brazil) Ponte Preta	3–1	0–1
Libertad (Paraguay)	2–1	(Colombia) Santa Fe	1–0	1–1

=== Match A ===
13 September 2017
21:45 UTC−3

Corinthians (Brazil)	1–1	(Argentina) Racing
Maycon 29'	Report	Triverio 73'

Arena Corinthians, São Paulo
Attendance: 25,451
Referee: Éber Aquino (Paraguay)

20 September 2017
21:45 UTC−3

Racing (Argentina)	0–0	(Brazil) Corinthians
	Report

Estadio Presidente Juan Domingo Perón, Avellaneda
Attendance: 24,000
Referee: Leodán González (Uruguay)

Tied 1–1 on aggregate, Racing won on away goals and advanced to the quarterfinals (Match S1).

=== Match B ===
12 September 2017
20:45 UTC−4

Cerro Porteño (Paraguay)	0–0	(Colombia) Junior
	Report

Estadio General Pablo Rojas, Asunción
Attendance: 28,000
Referee: Ricardo Marques (Brazil)

19 September 2017
19:45 UTC−5

Junior (Colombia)	3–1	(Paraguay) Cerro Porteño
Díaz 40'; T. Gutiérrez 51'; Chará 80'	Report	Ruiz 90+2'

Estadio Metropolitano Roberto Meléndez, Barranquilla
Attendance: 30,416
Referee: Darío Herrera (Argentina)

Junior won 3–1 on aggregate and advanced to the quarterfinals (Match S2).

=== Match C ===
13 September 2017
19:15 UTC−3

Chapecoense (Brazil)	0–0	(Brazil) Flamengo
	Report

Arena Condá, Chapecó
Attendance: 9,702
Referee: Gery Vargas (Bolivia)

20 September 2017
19:15 UTC−3

Flamengo (Brazil)	4–0	(Brazil) Chapecoense
Cuéllar 6'; Willian Arão 21'; Juan 62'; Lucas Paquetá 88'	Report

Estádio Ilha do Urubu, Rio de Janeiro
Attendance: 12,039
Referee: Michael Espinoza (Peru)

Flamengo won 4–0 on aggregate and advanced to the quarterfinals (Match S3).

=== Match D ===
23 August 2017
20:45 UTC−4

Nacional (Paraguay)	1–0	(Argentina) Estudiantes
Caballero 59'	Report

Estadio Defensores del Chaco, Asunción
Attendance: 8,000
Referee: Wilson Lamouroux (Colombia)

19 September 2017
19:15 UTC−3

Estudiantes (Argentina)	0–1	(Paraguay) Nacional
	Report	Jacquet 64'

Estadio Ciudad de La Plata, La Plata
Attendance: 35,000
Referee: Raphael Claus (Brazil)

Nacional won 2–0 on aggregate and advanced to the quarterfinals (Match S4).

=== Match E ===
22 August 2017
21:45 UTC−3

Atlético Tucumán (Argentina)	1–0	(Argentina) Independiente
Rodríguez 42'	Report

Estadio Monumental José Fierro, Tucumán
Attendance: 30,000
Referee: Anderson Daronco (Brazil)

12 September 2017
21:45 UTC−3

Independiente (Argentina)	2–0	(Argentina) Atlético Tucumán
Fernández 16'; Benítez 82'	Report

Estadio Libertadores de América, Avellaneda
Attendance: 30,000
Referee: Andrés Cunha (Uruguay)

Independiente won 2–1 on aggregate and advanced to the quarterfinals (Match S4).

=== Match F ===
14 September 2017
19:15 UTC−3

Fluminense (Brazil)	1–0	(Ecuador) LDU Quito
Gustavo Scarpa 6'	Report

Estádio do Maracanã, Rio de Janeiro
Attendance: 45,977
Referee: Julio Quintana (Paraguay)

21 September 2017
17:15 UTC−5

LDU Quito (Ecuador)	2–1	(Brazil) Fluminense
Barcos 57'; Cevallos 60'	Report	Pedro 86'

Estadio Rodrigo Paz Delgado, Quito
Attendance: 29,000
Referee: Fernando Rapallini (Argentina)

Tied 2–2 on aggregate, Fluminense won on away goals and advanced to the quarterfinals (Match S3).

=== Match G ===
13 September 2017
19:15 UTC−3

Sport Recife (Brazil)	3–1	(Brazil) Ponte Preta
Ronaldo Alves 7'; Rithely 44'; André 75'	Report	Felipe Saraiva 82'

Estádio Ilha do Retiro, Recife
Attendance: 6,254
Referee: Gustavo Murillo (Colombia)

20 September 2017
19:15 UTC−3

Ponte Preta (Brazil)	1–0	(Brazil) Sport Recife
Lucca 16'	Report

Estádio Moisés Lucarelli, Campinas
Attendance: 3,890
Referee: Roddy Zambrano (Ecuador)

Sport Recife won 3–2 on aggregate and advanced to the quarterfinals (Match S2).

=== Match H ===
24 August 2017
20:45 UTC−4

Libertad (Paraguay)	1–0	(Colombia) Santa Fe
Medina 59'	Report

Estadio Defensores del Chaco, Asunción
Attendance: 1,500
Referee: Darío Herrera (Argentina)

14 September 2017
19:45 UTC−5

Santa Fe (Colombia)	1–1	(Paraguay) Libertad
Tesillo 87'	Report	Ó. Cardozo 25'

Estadio El Campín, Bogotá
Attendance: 11,578
Referee: Diego Haro (Peru)

Libertad won 2–1 on aggregate and advanced to the quarterfinals (Match S1).

== Quarterfinals ==
The first legs were played on 24–26 October, and the second legs were played on 1 and 2 November 2017.

Team 1	Agg.	Team 2	1st leg	2nd leg
Libertad (Paraguay)	1–0	(Argentina) Racing	1–0	0–0
Sport Recife (Brazil)	0–2	(Colombia) Junior	0–2	0–0
Fluminense (Brazil)	3–4	(Brazil) Flamengo	0–1	3–3
Nacional (Paraguay)	1–6	(Argentina) Independiente	1–4	0–2

=== Match S1 ===
24 October 2017
21:45 UTC−3

Libertad (Paraguay)	1–0	(Argentina) Racing
Salcedo 25'	Report

Estadio Defensores del Chaco, Asunción
Attendance: 10,000
Referee: Raphael Claus (Brazil)

1 November 2017
19:15 UTC−3

Racing (Argentina)	0–0	(Paraguay) Libertad
	Report

Estadio Presidente Juan Domingo Perón, Avellaneda
Attendance: 28,000
Referee: Anderson Daronco (Brazil)

Libertad won 1–0 on aggregate and advanced to the semifinals (Match F1).

=== Match S2 ===
26 October 2017
20:45 UTC−3

Sport Recife (Brazil)	0–2	(Colombia) Junior
	Report	González 70', 85'

Estádio Ilha do Retiro, Recife
Attendance: 27,014
Referee: Fernando Rapallini (Argentina)

2 November 2017
19:45 UTC−5

Junior (Colombia)	0–0	(Brazil) Sport Recife
	Report

Estadio Metropolitano Roberto Meléndez, Barranquilla
Attendance: 32,354
Referee: Daniel Fedorczuk (Uruguay)

Junior won 2–0 on aggregate and advanced to the semifinals (Match F2).

=== Match S3 ===
25 October 2017
21:45 UTC−2

Fluminense (Brazil)	0–1	(Brazil) Flamengo
	Report	Éverton 26'

Estádio do Maracanã, Rio de Janeiro
Attendance: 30,945
Referee: Mario Díaz de Vivar (Paraguay)

1 November 2017
21:45 UTC−2

Flamengo (Brazil)	3–3	(Brazil) Fluminense
Diego 9'; Felipe Vizeu 67'; Willian Arão 83'	Report	Lucas 2'; Renato Chaves 40', 54'

Estádio do Maracanã, Rio de Janeiro
Attendance: 41,087
Referee: Patricio Loustau (Argentina)

Flamengo won 4–3 on aggregate and advanced to the semifinals (Match F2).

=== Match S4 ===
25 October 2017
19:15 UTC−3

Nacional (Paraguay)	1–4	(Argentina) Independiente
Caballero 33'	Report	Meza 27'; Fernández 48', 70'; Albertengo 76'

Estadio Defensores del Chaco, Asunción
Attendance: 7,000
Referee: Leodán González (Uruguay)

2 November 2017
19:15 UTC−3

Independiente (Argentina)	2–0	(Paraguay) Nacional
Martínez 51'; Gigliotti 66'	Report

Estadio Libertadores de América, Avellaneda
Attendance: 34,408
Referee: Roddy Zambrano (Ecuador)

Independiente won 6–1 on aggregate and advanced to the semifinals (Match F1).

== Semifinals ==
The first legs were played on 21 and 23 November, and the second legs will be played on 28 and 30 November 2017.

Team 1	Agg.	Team 2	1st leg	2nd leg
Libertad (Paraguay)	2–3	(Argentina) Independiente	1–0	1–3
Flamengo (Brazil)	4–1	(Colombia) Junior	2–1	2–0

=== Match F1 ===
21 November 2017
21:15 UTC−3

Libertad (Paraguay)	1–0	(Argentina) Independiente
Ó. Cardozo 1'	Report

Estadio Defensores del Chaco, Asunción
Attendance: 12,000
Referee: Víctor Carrillo (Peru)

28 November 2017
21:15 UTC−3

Independiente (Argentina)	3–1	(Paraguay) Libertad
Barco 16' (pen.); Gigliotti 18', 30'	Report	Lucena 24'

Estadio Libertadores de América, Avellaneda
Attendance: 44,350
Referee: Roddy Zambrano (Ecuador)

Independiente won 3–2 on aggregate and advanced to the finals.

=== Match F2 ===
23 November 2017
21:45 UTC−2

Flamengo (Brazil)	2–1	(Colombia) Junior
Juan 75'; Felipe Vizeu 81'	Report	T. Gutiérrez 20'

Estádio do Maracanã, Rio de Janeiro
Attendance: 41,804
Referee: José Argote (Venezuela)

30 November 2017
19:30 UTC−5

Junior (Colombia)	0–2	(Brazil) Flamengo
	Report	Felipe Vizeu 51', 90+1'

Estadio Metropolitano Roberto Meléndez, Barranquilla
Attendance: 38,808
Referee: Roberto Tobar (Chile)

Flamengo won 4–1 on aggregate and advanced to the finals.

== Finals ==
In the finals, if tied on aggregate, the away goals rule would not be used, and 30 minutes of extra time would be played. If still tied after extra time, the penalty shoot-out would be used to determine the winner (Regulations Article 6.2).

The first leg was played on 6 December, and the second leg was played on 13 December 2017.

6 December 2017
20:45 UTC−3

Independiente (Argentina)	2–1	(Brazil) Flamengo
Gigliotti 28'; Meza 52'	Report	Réver 8'

Estadio Libertadores de América, Avellaneda
Attendance: 45,000
Referee: Mario Díaz de Vivar (Paraguay)

13 December 2017
21:45 UTC−2

Flamengo (Brazil)	1–1	(Argentina) Independiente
Lucas Paquetá 29'	Report	Barco 39' (pen.)

Estádio do Maracanã, Rio de Janeiro
Attendance: 62,567
Referee: Wilmar Roldán (Colombia)

Independiente won 3–2 on aggregate.
