= Rodrigo Moreira (footballer, born 1996) =

Argentine footballer

Personal information
- Full name: Rodrigo Miguel Moreira
- Date of birth: 15 July 1996 (age 30)
- Place of birth: Villa Constitución, Argentina
- Height: 1.85 m (6 ft 1 in)
- Position: Centre-back

Team information
- Current team: Atlanta

Youth career
- Independiente

Senior career*
Years	Team	Apps	(Gls)
2014–2018	Independiente	3	(0)
2016–2017	→ San Martín Tucumán (loan)	41	(8)
2018–2020	San Martín Tucumán	28	(1)
2020–2023	Quilmes	49	(5)
2023–2024	Defensores de Belgrano	35	(7)
2024–2025	Deportes Limache	32	(3)
2025–	Atlanta	29	(1)

International career
2013	Argentina U17	12	(1)
2015	Argentina U20	6	(0)
- * Club domestic league appearances and goals as of 16:26, 24 April 2026 (UTC)

Rodrigo Miguel Moreira (born 15 July 1996) is an Argentine professional footballer who plays as a centre-back for Atlanta.

== Career ==
=== Club ===
Moreira's senior career with Independiente began in 2014 when he was a substitute for a Copa Argentina match with Belgrano, though he was unused in a 0–2 win on 28 July. On 5 August 2016, Moreira joined Primera B Nacional's San Martín on loan. He scored on his professional debut in a home draw versus Argentinos Juniors, which was the first of eight goals during 2016–17 for San Martín over forty-one appearances. He returned to Independiente in July 2017 and made his debut for the club on 8 September against Olimpo. On 30 June 2018, Moreira completed a return to former club San Martín; joining permanently. In August 2020, Moreira moved to Quilmes.

In 2024, he moved to Chile and joined Deportes Limache in the Primera B.

=== International ===
Moreira represented Argentina at U17 and U20 level. He won twelve caps for the U17s, winning the 2013 South American Under-17 Football Championship and scoring one goal (versus Ivory Coast) in six games at the 2013 FIFA U-17 World Cup in the United Arab Emirates. He played six times for the U20s, five of which came during the 2015 South American Youth Football Championship which Argentina won whilst the other cap came during the 2015 FIFA U-20 World Cup in New Zealand.

== Career statistics ==
As of 5 September 2018.

Club statistics
Club	Season	League			Cup (Note: Includes the Copa Argentina)		League Cup		Continental (Note: Includes the Copa Libertadores and Copa Sudamericana)		Other		Total	
Club	Season	Division	Apps	Goals	Apps	Goals	Apps	Goals	Apps	Goals	Apps	Goals	Apps	Goals
Independiente	2014	Primera División	0	0	0	0	—		—		0	0	0	0
Independiente	2015	Primera División	0	0	0	0	—		0	0	0	0	0	0
Independiente	2016	Primera División	0	0	0	0	—		—		0	0	0	0
Independiente	2016–17	Primera División	0	0	0	0	—		0	0	0	0	0	0
Independiente	2017–18	Primera División	3	0	0	0	—		2 (Note: Two appearances in 2017 Copa Sudamericana)	0	0	0	5	0
Independiente	Total		3	0	0	0	—		2	0	0	0	5	0
San Martín (loan)	2016–17	Primera B Nacional	41	8	0	0	—		—		0	0	41	8
San Martín	2018–19	Primera División	0	0	1	0	—		—		0	0	1	0
San Martín	Total		41	8	1	0	—		—		0	0	42	8
Career total			44	8	1	0	—		2	0	0	0	47	8

== Honours ==
=== Club ===
Independiente

- Copa Sudamericana: 2017

=== International ===
Argentina U17

- South American Under-17 Football Championship: 2013

Argentina U20

- South American Youth Football Championship: 2015
