= Mauricio del Castillo =

Argentine footballer (born 1996)

Personal information
- Full name: Mauricio Jordan del Castillo Agüero
- Date of birth: 10 March 1996 (age 30)
- Place of birth: Avellaneda, Argentina
- Height: 1.69 m (5 ft 6 1/2 in)
- Position: Forward

Senior career*
Years	Team	Apps	(Gls)
2016–2021	Independiente	1	(0)
2016–2017	→ Deportivo Morón (loan)	4	(0)
2017–2018	→ Defensores de Belgrano (loan)	2	(0)
2019–2020	→ Tristán Suárez (loan)	1	(0)

International career
2013	Argentina U17	1	(0)
- * Club domestic league appearances and goals as of 23:05, 7 December 2020 (UTC)

Mauricio Jordan del Castillo Agüero (born 10 March 1996) is an Argentine professional footballer who plays as a forward. He is currently a free agent.

== Club career ==
Del Castillo started his senior career with Independiente in 2016. On 3 July, del Castillo joined Deportivo Morón of Primera B Metropolitana on loan. He made his professional debut on 3 September in a 2–1 victory over Estudiantes, which was the first of six appearances in all competitions for the club. Ahead of the 2017–18 season, del Castillo signed for Primera B Metropolitana side Defensores de Belgrano. Just two appearances followed, with both occurring off the bench in March during home matches with Villa San Carlos and San Telmo. He returned to his parent club in June 2018.

After twelve months in Independiente's reserves, a spell which also saw the forward extend his contract, del Castillo was loaned out to Tristán Suárez in July 2019. His debut arrived in October against Los Andes, which would be his only match for them. Upon returning to Independiente, he again signed a new contract in August 2020. del Castillo made an Independiente competitive, first-team teamsheet for the first time on 1 November, though wasn't selected to come on in a Copa de la Liga Profesional win over Central Córdoba. His debut for the club soon arrived in that competition, as he appeared for the final moments of a 1–0 win over Defensa y Justicia on 6 December.

== International career ==
Del Castillo represented Argentina U17s at the 2013 South American Under-17 Football Championship, winning one cap against Venezuela.

== Personal life ==
Del Castillo is the brother of fellow footballers Gastón del Castillo and Sergio Agüero.

== Career statistics ==
As of 7 December 2020.

Club statistics
Club	Season	League			Cup		League Cup		Continental		Other		Total	
Club	Season	Division	Apps	Goals	Apps	Goals	Apps	Goals	Apps	Goals	Apps	Goals	Apps	Goals
Independiente	2016–17	Primera División	0	0	0	0	—		0	0	0	0	0	0
Independiente	2017–18	Primera División	0	0	0	0	—		0	0	0	0	0	0
Independiente	2018–19	Primera División	0	0	0	0	0	0	0	0	0	0	0	0
Independiente	2019–20	Primera División	0	0	0	0	0	0	0	0	0	0	0	0
Independiente	2020–21 (Note: Soccerway counts Copa de la Liga Profesional appearances as league appearances.)	Primera División	1	0	0	0	0	0	0	0	0	0	1	0
Independiente	Total		1	0	0	0	0	0	0	0	0	0	1	0
Deportivo Morón (loan)	2016–17	Primera B Metropolitana	4	0	2	0	—		—		0	0	6	0
Defensores de Belgrano (loan)	2017–18	Primera B Metropolitana	2	0	0	0	—		—		0	0	2	0
Tristán Suárez (loan)	2019–20	Primera B Metropolitana	1	0	0	0	—		—		0	0	1	0
Career total			8	0	2	0	0	0	0	0	0	0	10	0

== Honours ==
=== Club ===
Deportivo Morón

- Primera B Metropolitana: 2016–17

=== International ===
Argentina U17

- South American Under-17 Football Championship: 2013
