= Gastón del Castillo =

Argentine footballer (born 1997)

Personal information
- Full name: Gastón Alexander del Castillo
- Date of birth: 10 June 1997 (age 29)
- Place of birth: Avellaneda, Argentina
- Height: 1.67 m (5 ft 5 1/2 in)
- Position: Forward

Team information
- Current team: Saltillo

Youth career
- Independiente

Senior career*
Years	Team	Apps	(Gls)
2016–2018	Independiente	2	(0)
2016–2017	→ Cádiz B (loan)	2	(0)
2016–2017	→ Cádiz (loan)	1	(0)
2017	→ Arsenal de Sarandí (loan)	0	(0)
2018–2019	Newell's Old Boys II		
2019–	Saltillo		
- * Club domestic league appearances and goals as of 14:31, 17 November 2017 (UTC)

Gastón Alexander del Castillo (born 10 June 1997) is an Argentine professional footballer who plays as a forward for Saltillo FC in Mexico.

== Career ==
Born in Avellaneda, Castillo was promoted to train with the Independiente first-team in August 2015. He made his professional debut for the club on 30 April 2016 in the Primera División against San Lorenzo. He came on as a 79th-minute substitute for Leandro Fernández as Independiente lost 1–0.

On 30 August 2016, Castillo was loaned to Segunda División side Cádiz CF, for one year. He joined Arsenal de Sarandí on loan in August 2017.

In August 2019, Castillo was transferred to Saltillo FC in the Liga Premier Mexicana (3rd Division).

== Personal life ==
Castillo is the brother of fellow footballers Mauricio del Castillo and Sergio Agüero.

== Career statistics ==
As of 22 May 2016

Club	Season	League			Domestic Cup		League Cup		Continental		Total	
Club	Season	Division	Apps	Goals	Apps	Goals	Apps	Goals	Apps	Goals	Apps	Goals
Independiente	2016	Argentine Primera División	2	0	0	0	—	—	—	—	2	0
Career total			2	0	0	0	0	0	0	0	2	0
