= Fausto Grillo =

Argentine footballer (born 1993)

Personal information
- Full name: Lautaro Fausto Grillo
- Date of birth: 20 February 1993 (age 33)
- Place of birth: Bariloche, Rio Negro, Argentina
- Height: 1.81 m (5 ft 11 in)
- Position: Centre back

Team information
- Current team: Deportes Concepción
- Number: 37

Senior career*
Years	Team	Apps	(Gls)
2014–2018	Vélez Sarsfield	47	(1)
2018–2019	Göztepe	0	(0)
2019–2020	Trapani	23	(1)
2021–2022	Volos	30	(1)
2022–2023	O'Higgins	28	(1)
2023	Ibiza	17	(1)
2023–2025	Universidad Católica	34	(2)
2025	Belgrano	10	(0)
2025	Atlético Tucumán	1	(0)
2026–	Deportes Concepción	0	(0)
- * Club domestic league appearances and goals as of 17:03, 21 November 2025 (UTC)

Lautaro Fausto Grillo (born 20 February 1993) is an Argentine professional footballer who plays as a central defender for Chilean club Deportes Concepción.

== Club career ==
On 26 November 2019, Grillo signed a contract with Italian Serie B club Trapani until the end of the 2019–20 season.

In January 2026, Grillo returned to Chile after his stint with O'Higgins in 2022–23 and joined Deportes Concepción.
