= Franco Bellocq =

Argentine footballer (born 1993)

Personal information
- Date of birth: 15 October 1993 (age 33)
- Place of birth: General Levalle, Argentina
- Height: 1.75 m (5 ft 9 in)
- Position: Midfielder

Team information
- Current team: Rangers

Youth career
- Estudiantes
- 2007–2013: Independiente

Senior career*
Years	Team	Apps	(Gls)
2013–2018	Independiente	34	(0)
2016–2017	→ Arsenal de Sarandí (loan)	25	(2)
2017–2018	→ Olimpo (loan)	16	(0)
2018–2021	Asteras Tripolis	33	(0)
2021–2022	Taranto	20	(1)
2022	Atlético Rafaela	13	(0)
2023	Alvarado	28	(0)
2024	Tristán Suárez	18	(0)
2024–	Rangers	0	(0)
- * Club domestic league appearances and goals as of 30 July 2024

Franco Bellocq (born 15 October 1993) is an Argentine professional footballer who plays as a midfielder for Chilean club Rangers.

== Club career ==
Bellocq started in the youth ranks of Buenos Aires club Estudiantes, before joining the Independiente youth team in 2007. Six years later, Bellocq was promoted into Independiente's first-team and featured in the matchday squad for the first-time in May 2013 for a Copa Argentina match against Boca Unidos. He made his debut in Primera B Nacional on 27 February 2014 in a home loss to Atlético Tucumán. He went onto make nine more league appearances in 2013–14 as Independiente won promotion into the 2014 Argentine Primera División. In the subsequent two seasons, Bellocq made twenty-four league appearances.

On 10 January 2016, Bellocq joined fellow Primera División club Arsenal de Sarandí on loan until 2017. In total, he participated in thirty-one games in all competitions and scored four goals. In July 2017, Bellocq joined Olimpo on loan. His first appearance for Olimpo came on 30 October in a 1–1 draw with Defensa y Justicia. He returned to his parent club on 16 May 2018. Bellocq signed for Super League Greece side Asteras Tripolis on 23 June.

On 12 August 2021, he signed with Taranto in the Italian third-tier Serie C.

On 6 February 2022, Bellocq returned to Argentina and signed with Atlético de Rafaela.

In the second half of 2024, Bellocq moved to Chile and signed with Rangers in the Primera B.

== Career statistics ==
As of 8 May 2019.

Club statistics
Club	Season	League			Cup (Note: Includes the Copa Argentina and Greek Football Cup)		League Cup		Continental (Note: Includes the Copa Libertadores, Copa Sudamericana and UEFA Europa League)		Other		Total	
Club	Season	Division	Apps	Goals	Apps	Goals	Apps	Goals	Apps	Goals	Apps	Goals	Apps	Goals
Independiente	2013–14	Primera B Nacional	10	0	0	0	—		—		0	0	10	0
Independiente	2014	Primera División	13	0	2	0	—		—		0	0	15	0
Independiente	2015	Primera División	11	0	1	0	—		0	0	0	0	12	0
Independiente	2016	Primera División	0	0	0	0	—		0	0	0	0	0	0
Independiente	2016–17	Primera División	0	0	0	0	—		0	0	0	0	0	0
Independiente	2017–18	Primera División	0	0	0	0	—		0	0	0	0	0	0
Independiente	Total		34	0	3	0	—		0	0	0	0	37	0
Arsenal de Sarandí (loan)	2016	Primera División	8	2	1	1	—		—		0	0	9	3
Arsenal de Sarandí (loan)	2016–17	Primera División	17	0	3	0	—		2 (Note: Two appearances in 2017 Copa Sudamericana)	1 (Note: One goal in 2017 Copa Sudamericana)	0	0	22	1
Arsenal de Sarandí (loan)	Total		25	2	4	1	—		2	1	0	0	31	4
Olimpo (loan)	2017–18	Primera División	16	0	0	0	—		—		0	0	16	0
Asteras Tripolis	2018–19	Super League Greece	13	0	7	0	—		2	0	0	0	22	0
Career total			88	2	14	1	—		4	1	0	0	106	4
