= Walter Erviti =

Argentine footballer

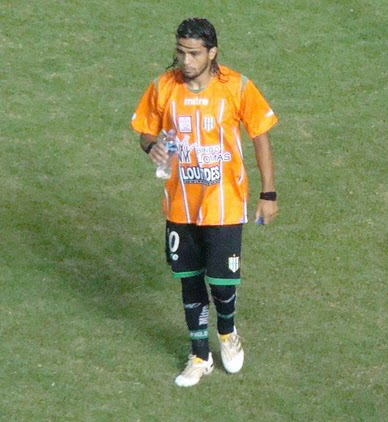

Personal information
- Full name: Walter Daniel Erviti Roldán
- Date of birth: 12 June 1980 (age 46)
- Place of birth: Mar del Plata, Argentina
- Height: 1.69 m (5 ft 6 1/2 in)
- Position: Midfielder

Team information
- Current team: Monterrey (assistant)

Youth career
- San Lorenzo

Senior career*
Years	Team	Apps	(Gls)
1998–2002	San Lorenzo	81	(5)
2002–2008	Monterrey	215	(18)
2008–2010	Banfield	88	(3)
2011–2013	Boca Juniors	78	(10)
2013–2014	Atlante	17	(2)
2014–2017	Banfield	88	(6)
2017	Independiente	19	(1)
2018	Alvarado	3	(1)

International career
2010	Argentina	1	(0)

Managerial career
- 2021–2022: Atlanta
- 2024: Audax Italiano
- 2025: Belgrano
- 2025: Almirante Brown (sporting director)
- 2026–: Monterrey (assistant)
- * Club domestic league appearances and goals

Walter Daniel Erviti Roldán (born 12 June 1980) is an Argentine football manager and former player who played mainly as a deep-lying playmaker.

== Career ==
=== Club career ===
Erviti began his playing career in 1998 with San Lorenzo de Almagro, where he was part of the squad that won the Clausura 2001 championship.

In 2002, he joined the Mexican side of Monterrey. In 2003, he won his second league championship when Monterrey won the Clausura 2003 championship.

In 2008, Erviti returned to Argentina to play for Banfield, and was a key player in the squad that won the Argentine championship for the first time in the history of the club, featuring in every game of the Apertura 2009 championship season.

On January 31, 2011, Erviti left Banfield and signed a three-year contract with Boca Juniors, that paid US$3.2 million for his transfer.

In June 2013 he joined Mexican side Atlante F.C.

=== International career ===
Erviti made his international debut for the Argentina national team on 26 January 2010 at the age of 29 in a 3–2 win in a friendly match against Costa Rica.

== Coaching career ==
On 28 January 2021, Erviti was appointed manager of Atlanta, in what would be his first experience as a coach. After a bad start to the 2022 season, Erviti agreed to step down from the position on 1 May 2022.

== Honours ==
=== Club ===
San Lorenzo

- Argentine Primera División: 1

2001 Clausura

- Copa Mercosur: 1

2001

Monterrey

- Mexican Primera División: 1

2003 Clausura

Banfield

- Argentine Primera División: 1

2009 Apertura

Boca Juniors

- Argentine Primera División: 1

2011 Apertura

- Copa Argentina: 1

2012
