= Fernando Gaibor =

Ecuadorian footballer (born 1991)

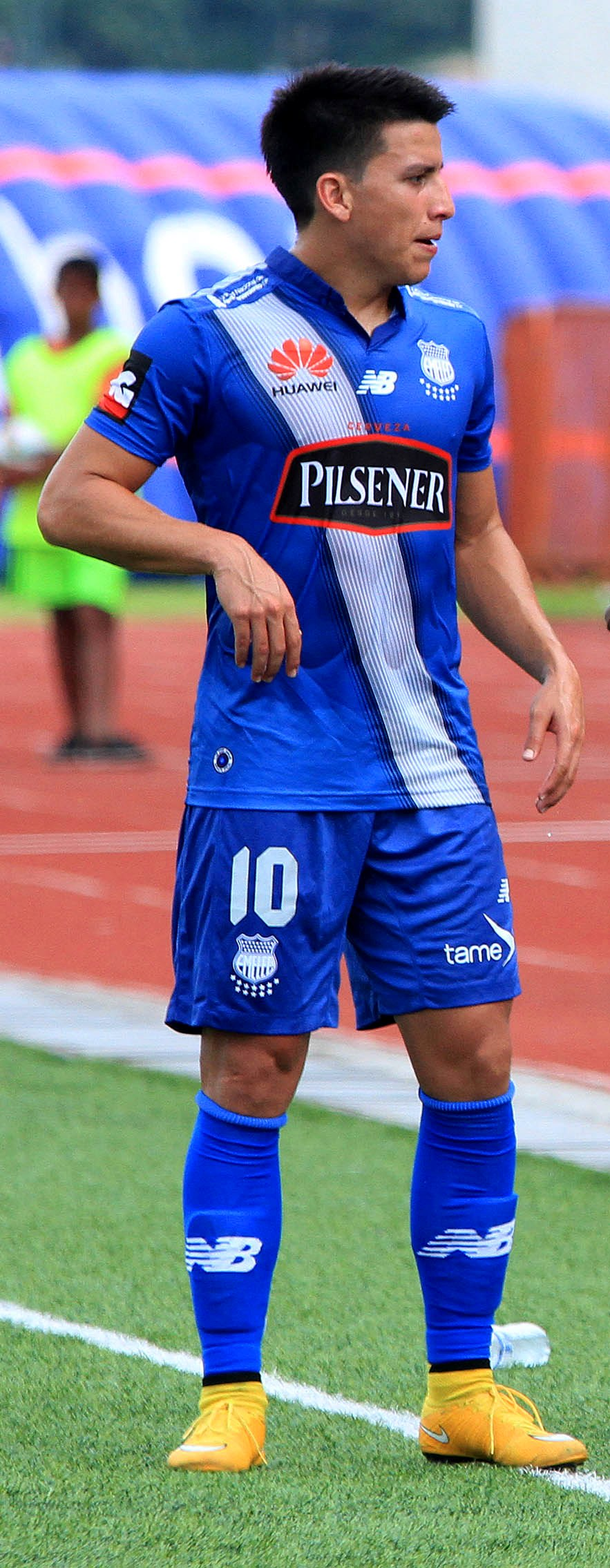

Personal information
- Full name: Fernando Vicente Gaibor Orellana
- Date of birth: October 8, 1991 (age 35)
- Place of birth: Montalvo, Los Ríos, Ecuador
- Height: 1.78 m (5 ft 10 in)
- Position: Midfielder

Team information
- Current team: Alianza Lima
- Number: 7

Youth career
- 2004–2008: Emelec

Senior career*
Years	Team	Apps	(Gls)
2007–2018	Emelec	230	(31)
2018–2020	Independiente	34	(4)
2019–2020	→ Al-Wasl (loan)	12	(3)
2020–2021	→ Guayaquil City (loan)	21	(2)
2021–2022	Independiente del Valle	40	(6)
2023–2024	Barcelona SC	50	(1)
2025–	Alianza Lima	34	(2)

International career^{‡}
2013–	Ecuador	19	(2)
- * Club domestic league appearances and goals as of December 29, 2025 ‡ National team caps and goals as of January 26, 2022

Fernando Vicente Gaibor Orellana (born October 8, 1991) is an Ecuadorian professional footballer who plays as a midfielder for Alianza Lima in the Liga 1 (Peru).

== Club career ==
=== Emelec ===
==== 2010–2012 ====
He came from Emelec's youth system and he is believed to be one of the most promising young players in Ecuador. He has played for Emelec for all of his short career. According to Ecuadorian pundits, he looks like one of the most promising new players of Ecuador. His club debut came on February 28, in a 5–0 away loss to LDU Quito. He scored his first career goals for Emelec on November 27, in a 3–2 away win against Universidad Catolica, scoring 2 goals. He participated in the 2010 Ecuadorian Serie A final matches against LDU Quito, becoming runner-up champions by an aggregate score of 2–1. Gaibor scored 4 goals in the 2011 season. By the end of the 2011 Ecuadorian Serie A, he was given the Best Young Player award for the season. He again participated in the final matches for league champion, losing to Deportivo Quito by an aggregate score of 2–0, once again becoming runners-up. In the 2011 Ecuadorian Serie A season, he scored 6 goals, in 37 league games played. On April 4, in a home 2012 Copa Libertadores match against Brazil giants Flamengo, Gaibor scored the winning penalty after extra-time, winning 3–2.

==== 2013 ====
Gaibor's first game of the season was an emphatic 3–0 home win over Macara. His first league goal of the season was the winning goal in a thrilling 2–1 away win against Ecuadorian giants LDU Quito. His first goal of the 2013 Copa Libertadores was on April 2, scoring the second goal in the 94th minute, winning the home match against Uruguayan team C.A. Peñarol.

== International career ==
Fernando was part of the Ecuadorian Under 20 squad for the U-20 World Cup in Colombia July 19 – August 20.

He was called up for the Friendly matches against Argentina and Honduras on November 15 and 19, 2013. He made his debut as a second-half substitute for Christian Noboa against Argentina.

== Career statistics ==
As of February 6, 2017

Club	Season	League		Cup		Continental		Other		Total	
Club	Season	Apps	Goals	Apps	Goals	Apps	Goals	Apps	Goals	Apps	Goals
Emelec	2010	19	2	—		1	0	—		20	2
Emelec	2011	35	4	—		5	0	—		40	4
Emelec	2012	37	6	—		12	2	—		49	8
Emelec	2013	34	5	—		8	2	—		42	7
Emelec	2014	11	3	—		5	0	—		16	3
Emelec	2015	24	2	—		9	0	—		33	2
Emelec	2016	32	3	—		10	1	—		42	4
Emelec	2017	38	6	—		8	0	—		46	6
Emelec	Total	230	31	—		58	5	—		288	36
Career total		230	31	0	0	58	5	0	0	288	36

=== International goals ===
Scores and results list Ecuador's goal tally first.

No	Date	Venue	Opponent	Score	Result	Competition
1.	13 June 2017	Red Bull Arena, Harrison, United States	El Salvador	3–0	3–0	Friendly
2.	26 June 2017	Estadio George Capwell, Guayaquil, Ecuador	Trinidad and Tobago	2–1	3–1	Friendly

== Honours ==
=== Clubs ===
Emelec

- Serie A Runner-up (4): 2010, 2011, 2012, 2016
- Serie A (3) : 2013, 2014, 2015

=== Individual ===
Emelec

- Serie A: Best Young Player Award 2011
