= Maximiliano Meza (footballer, born 1992) =

Argentine footballer

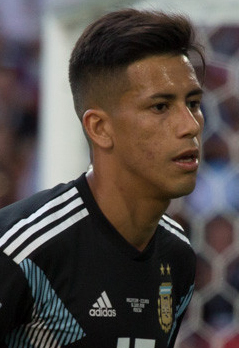
- Meza with Argentina at the 2018 FIFA World Cup

Personal information
- Full name: Maximiliano Eduardo Meza
- Date of birth: 15 December 1992 (age 33)
- Place of birth: Caá Catí, Argentina
- Height: 1.81 m (5 ft 11 in)
- Position: Winger

Team information
- Current team: Independiente
- Number: 8

Youth career
- Club Cambá Porá
- Gimnasia y Esgrima

Senior career*
Years	Team	Apps	(Gls)
2012–2016	Gimnasia y Esgrima	100	(12)
2016–2018	Independiente	55	(6)
2019–2024	Monterrey	200	(29)
2024–2026	River Plate	32	(5)
2026–	Independiente	1	(0)

International career^{‡}
2018–2022	Argentina	11	(0)
- * Club domestic league appearances and goals as of 18:11, 28 July 2026 (UTC) ‡ National team caps and goals as of 02:13, 2 February 2022 (UTC)

Maximiliano Eduardo Meza (born 15 December 1992) is an Argentine professional footballer who plays as a winger or attacking midfielder for Argentine Primera Division club Independiente.

== Club career ==
=== Gimnasia ===
Meza, off a stint with Club Cambá Porá, was promoted into Gimnasia y Esgrima's first-team in 2012 and subsequently made his professional debut on 10 December against Deportivo Merlo in the Primera B Nacional, he made fourteen league appearances in total in Gimansia's promotion-winning season of 2012–13. In the following season, Meza became a regular for the club as he made thirty-six appearances and scored five goals; the first five goals of his career. Over the next three league campaigns he made fifty-three appearances in all competitions while scoring seven goals, the last coming versus Colón on 23 May 2016.

=== Independiente ===
On 18 September 2016, a week after making his 100th league appearance for Gimnasia, he left the club to sign for fellow Primera División club Independiente. His Independiente debut came in a 2016 Copa Sudamericana Round of 16 match against Brazilian side Chapecoense on 22 September. During the 2017–18 season, Meza made nine appearances and scored three goals in Independiente's 2017 Copa Sudamericana winning campaign.

=== Monterrey ===
In January 2019, Meza moved abroad and joined Mexican club Monterrey; signing a five-year contract. He was assigned shirt number 32. He made his Monterrey debut on 13 January 2019 against León, before scoring his first goal in his second appearance on 20 January versus Querétaro. Later that year, Meza appeared eight times as the club won the CONCACAF Champions League; coming off the bench in both legs of the final against Tigres UANL. He was later part of the squads that won the 2019–20 Apertura and 2019–20 Copa MX. Meza also appeared in three matches and scored once, versus Al Hilal, at the 2019 FIFA Club World Cup.

=== River Plate ===
In August 2024, Meza returned to Argentina and joined River Plate.

== International career ==
In March 2018, Meza was called up to the senior squad for friendlies with Italy and Spain later that month. He made his debut on 27 March against Spain, playing the full ninety minutes of a 6–1 defeat at the Wanda Metropolitano. Meza was selected in Argentina's official squad for the 2018 FIFA World Cup on 21 May, having previously made the preliminary squad on 14 May. He made his first World Cup appearance on 16 June versus Iceland. He was part of a team that won the friendly Adidas Cup against Mexico in November 2018 He made Lionel Scaloni's initial forty-man squad for the 2019 Copa América, but was removed for the final tournament.

== Career statistics ==
=== Club ===
As of 16 May 2021

Club statistics
Club	Season	League			Cup		Continental		Other		Total	
Club	Season	Division	Apps	Goals	Apps	Goals	Apps	Goals	Apps	Goals	Apps	Goals
Gimnasia y Esgrima	2012–13	Primera B Nacional	14	0	2	0	—		0	0	16	0
Gimnasia y Esgrima	2013–14	Argentine Primera División	36	5	0	0	0	0	0	0	36	5
Gimnasia y Esgrima	2014	Argentine Primera División	7	0	1	0	0	0	0	0	8	0
Gimnasia y Esgrima	2015	Argentine Primera División	32	4	3	0	—		0	0	35	4
Gimnasia y Esgrima	2016	Argentine Primera División	9	3	1	0	—		0	0	10	3
Gimnasia y Esgrima	2016–17	Argentine Primera División	2	0	1	0	—		0	0	3	0
Gimnasia y Esgrima	Total		100	12	8	0	0	0	0	0	108	12
Independiente	2016–17	Argentine Primera División	25	2	1	0	4 (Note: Appearance(s) in Copa Sudamericana)	0	0	0	30	2
Independiente	2017–18	Argentine Primera División	19	3	1	1	14 (Note: Appearance(s) in Copa Libertadores and Copa Sudamericana)	3	2 (Note: Appearance(s) in Recopa Sudamericana)	0	36	7
Independiente	2018–19	Argentine Primera División	11	1	1	1	4 (Note: Appearance(s) in Copa Libertadores)	0	1 (Note: Appearance in Suruga Bank Championship)	0	17	2
Independiente	Total		55	6	3	2	22	3	3	0	83	11
Monterrey	2018–19	Liga MX	19	2	—		8 (Note: Appearance(s) in CONCACAF Champions League)	0	—		27	2
Monterrey	2019–20	Liga MX	29	1	7	2	—		3 (Note: Appearance(s) in FIFA Club World Cup)	1	39	4
Monterrey	2020–21	Liga MX	36	7	—		1	2	0	0	38	9
Monterrey	Total		84	10	7	2	9	2	3	1	103	15
Career total			239	28	18	4	31	5	6	1	294	38

=== International ===
As of match played 1 February 2022

National team	Year	Apps	Goals
Argentina	2018	10	0
Argentina	2022	1	0
Total		11	0

== Honours ==
Independiente

- Copa Sudamericana: 2017
- Suruga Bank Championship: 2018

Monterrey

- Liga MX: Apertura 2019
- Copa MX: 2019–20
- CONCACAF Champions League: 2019, 2021

Individual

- CONCACAF Champions League Team of the Tournament: 2021
- Liga MX All-Star: 2024
