= Damián Albil =

Argentine footballer (born 1979)

Personal information
- Full name: Damián Gonzalo Albil
- Date of birth: 9 February 1979 (age 47)
- Place of birth: Lomas de Zamora, Argentina
- Height: 1.82 m (6 ft 0 in)
- Position: Goalkeeper

Senior career*
Years	Team	Apps	(Gls)
2000–2004	Independiente	19	(0)
2004–2012	Estudiantes LP	49	(0)
2010–2011	→ San Lorenzo (loan)	9	(0)
2012–2014	Tigre	13	(0)
2014–2016	Ferro	34	(0)
2016	Central Córdoba (SdE)	6	(0)
2016–2018	Independiente	1	(0)
- * Club domestic league appearances and goals

Damián Gonzalo Albil (born 9 February 1979) is an Argentine former football goalkeeper.

== Career ==
Albil started his career with Independiente in 2000. He was part of the championship winning squad in Apertura 2002.

In 2004, he joined Estudiantes de La Plata and was the unused reserve goalkeeper when they won the Apertura 2006 tournament. In 2009, he watched from the bench as Estudiantes won Copa Libertadores 2009 with Mariano Andújar in goal. Albil was the goalkeeper for Estudiantes in the final of the 2009 FIFA Club World Cup, where they lost to FC Barcelona 2–1 after extra time.

In 2010, after 6 years in Estudiantes, the Argentine goalkeeper was loaned to San Lorenzo de Almagro.

== Personal life ==
Damián's father, Domingo, also played for Central Córdoba, spending a majority of his career in El Salvador throughout the 1970s.

== Honours ==
Independiente

- Argentine Primera División: 2002 Apertura
- Copa Sudamericana: 2017

Estudiantes de La Plata

- Argentine Primera División: 2006 Apertura
- Copa Libertadores: 2009
