= Gastón Silva =

Uruguayan footballer (born 1994)

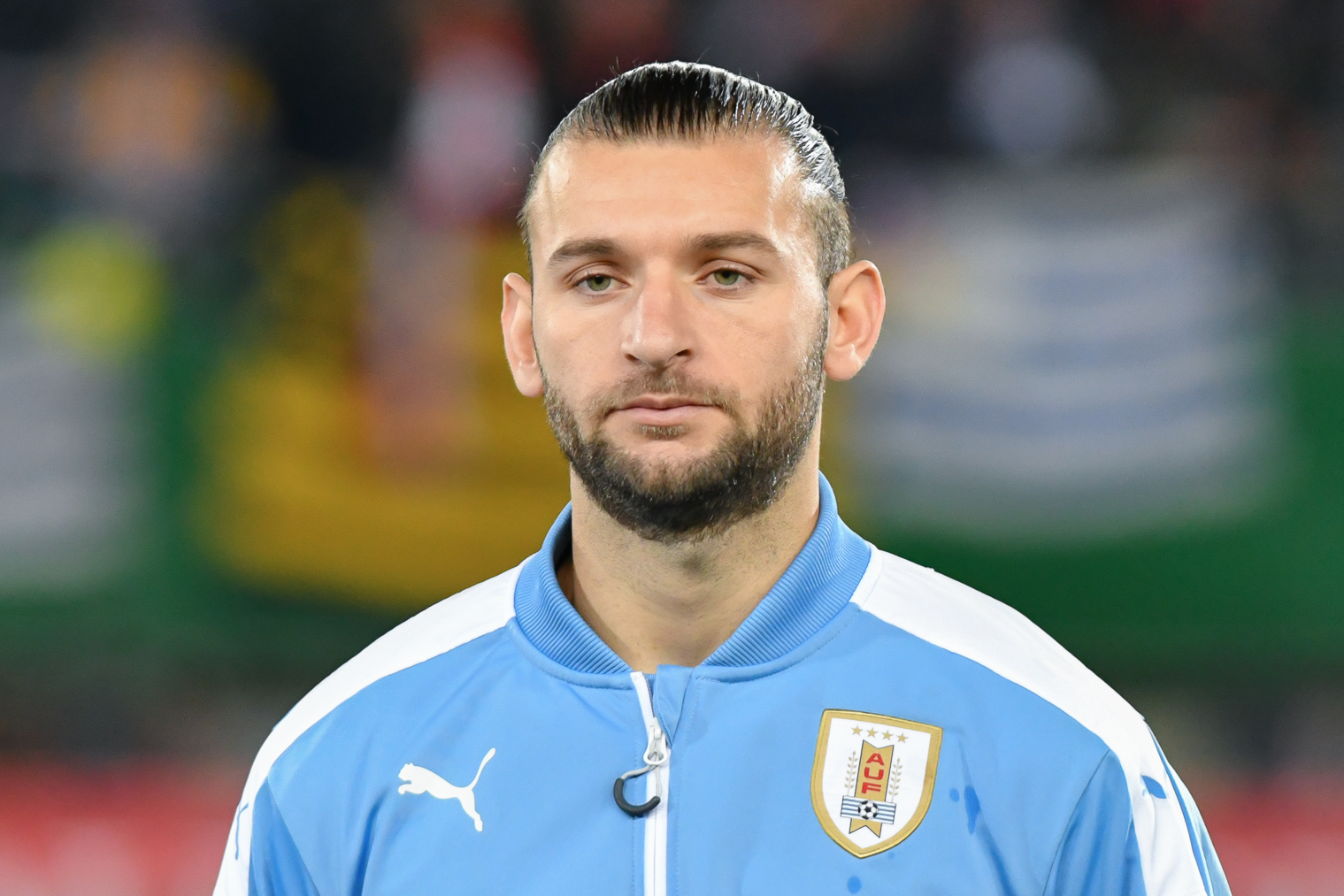
- Silva with Uruguay in 2017

Personal information
- Full name: Gastón Alexis Silva Perdomo
- Date of birth: 5 March 1994 (age 32)
- Place of birth: Salto, Uruguay
- Height: 1.85 m (6 ft 1 in)
- Position: Centre-back

Team information
- Current team: Progreso
- Number: 27

Youth career
- 2007–2011: Defensor Sporting

Senior career*
Years	Team	Apps	(Gls)
2011–2014	Defensor Sporting	25	(0)
2014–2017	Torino	17	(0)
2016–2017	→ Granada (loan)	22	(0)
2017–2020	Independiente	44	(1)
2020–2021	Huesca	12	(0)
2021–2022	Cartagena	27	(1)
2022–2024	Puebla	67	(2)
2025	Peñarol	6	(0)
2026–	Progreso	0	(0)

International career
2008–2009	Uruguay U15	11	(0)
2010–2011	Uruguay U17	44	(2)
2012–2013	Uruguay U20	30	(1)
2011	Uruguay U22	5	(1)
2014–2018	Uruguay	19	(0)
Medal record
Representing Uruguay
Men's Football
Pan American Games
Bronze medal – third place	2011 Guadalajara
FIFA U-20 World Cup
Runner-up	2013 Turkey
South American U-20 Championship
Third place	2013 Argentina
FIFA U-17 World Cup
Runner-up	2011 Mexico
South American U-17 Championship
Runner-up	2011 Ecuador
- * Club domestic league appearances and goals as of 1 October 2025

Gastón Alexis Silva Perdomo (born 5 March 1994) is a Uruguayan professional footballer who plays as a defender for Progreso.

== Club career ==
=== Defensor Sporting ===
He began his professional career in Defensor Sporting, debuting on 8 November 2011, at age 16, in the 0–2 away win against Montevideo Wanderers, substituting Brahian Alemán. On 18 April 2012 he made his official debut in the Copa Libertadores in a 1–3 away win against Argentina's Club Atlético Vélez Sarsfield. He made a total of 29 appearances and provided 2 assists between the Uruguayan Primera División and Copa Libertadores

In the 2011–12 Uruguayan Primera División season he played a game in the Apertura tournament, but was often a starter in the Clausura tournament, contributing to the final victory. The following season, he played in all 17 games in the league and four in the Copa Libertadores, confirming his position as one of the emerging prospects of Uruguayan football.

=== Torino ===
On 21 July 2014 Silva transferred to Serie A side Torino for €2.3 million, signing a four-year contract with an option for a fifth. On 18 September he made his debut for Torino in the UEFA Europa League against Club Brugge; he scored his first goal ever for Torino in the cup against Copenhagen, ending 1–5.

==== Granada (loan) ====
On 18 August 2016, Silva joined Spanish side Granada CF on a season-long loan deal. He made his La Liga debut ten days later, replacing Gabriel Silva in a 1–5 away loss against UD Las Palmas.

=== Pumas UNAM–Independiente Controversy ===
On 24 July 2017, it was announced that Mexican club Pumas UNAM had signed Silvia on a two-year contract. However, on 27 July Italian side Torino (the club that held the contractual rights of the player) had announced that Silva was officially transferred to Pumas UNAM. Silva was expected to appear in Mexico City for the contract signing on 31 July but sources in Argentina indicated that said player had already passed medical examinations and eventually signed with Argentine club Independiente, even though his pay would be much less than that Pumas UNAM had offered. The Mexican side was not aware of this action which generated much disappointment. On 1 August 2017, UNAM stated in a press conference that they would take the proper measures and possibly enact legal action against Gastón Silva by consulting with Liga MX and Femexfut executives.

In June 2018, UNAM lost the case against Silva and had to pay over $1.6 million to Italian side Torino for a player transfer that was never fulfilled.

=== Huesca ===
On 3 September 2020, La Liga club Huesca announced the signing of Silva on a one-year deal.

=== Cartagena ===
On 23 August 2021, free agent Silva signed a contract with Segunda División side FC Cartagena.

== International career ==
During 2011, Silva played with the Uruguay national U17 football team at the 2011 FIFA U-17 World Cup in Mexico. Previously, he played the 2011 South American Under-17 Football Championship in Ecuador. In 2012, Silva played with the Uruguay national U20 football team at the 2013 FIFA U-20 World Cup in Turkey. In 2011, he was named to participate in the Uruguay national football team under-22 squad for the 2011 Pan American Games.

On 1 November 2014, Silva was called up to the Uruguay national team by Óscar Tabárez for two friendly matches on 13 and 18 November against Costa Rica and Chile.

In May 2018 he was named in Uruguay's provisional 26 man squad for the 2018 World Cup in Russia.

== Personal life ==
His older brother Martín Silva is also a footballer who plays for Bra in Serie D.

Silva also holds Italian nationality, thus not restricted by the league regulation on non-European Union citizens.

== Style of play ==
Naturally left-footed, at Defensor Sporting he was fielded as a left full-back, his preferred role, while in the national team he is often used as a central defender.

== Career statistics ==
=== Club ===
As of 24 May 2017

Club	Season	League		Cup		Continental		Total	
Club	Season	Apps	Goals	Apps	Goals	Apps	Goals	Apps	Goals
Defensor	2011–12	2	0	0	0	1	0	3	0
Defensor	2012–13	7	0	0	0	0	0	7	0
Defensor	2013–14	17	0	0	0	4	0	21	0
Defensor	Total	26	0	0	0	5	0	31	0
Torino	2014–15	5	0	0	0	4	1	9	1
Torino	2015–16	12	0	1	0	0	0	13	0
Torino	Total	17	0	1	0	4	1	22	1
Granada	2016–17	22	0	1	0	0	0	23	0
Granada	Total	22	0	1	0	0	0	23	0
Career totals		65	0	2	0	9	1	76	1

=== International ===
Statistics accurate as of match played 12 October 2018.

Uruguay
Year	Apps	Goals
2014	1	0
2015	1	0
2016	9	0
2017	5	0
2018	3	0
Total	19	0

== Honours ==
Independiente

- Copa Sudamericana: 2017

Uruguay U17

- 2011 FIFA U-17 World Cup: Runner-Up
- 2011 South American Under-17 Football Championship: Runner-Up
- 2013 FIFA U-20 World Cup: Runner-Up
