= Juan Sánchez Miño =

Argentine footballer

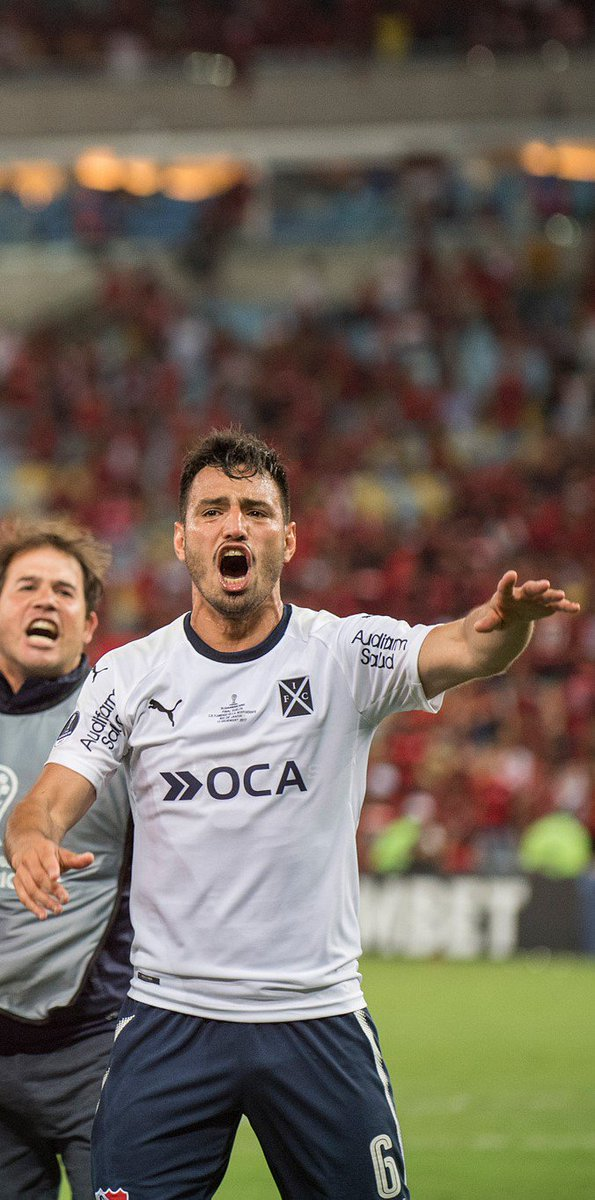

Personal information
- Full name: Juan Manuel Sánchez Miño
- Date of birth: 1 January 1990 (age 36)
- Place of birth: Buenos Aires, Argentina
- Height: 1.68 m (5 ft 6 in)
- Positions: Left midfielder; left-back; midfielder

Youth career
- 2004–2010: Boca Juniors

Senior career*
Years	Team	Apps	(Gls)
2010–2014	Boca Juniors	79	(6)
2014–2016	Torino	11	(0)
2015	→ Estudiantes (loan)	26	(3)
2016	→ Cruzeiro (loan)	15	(1)
2016–2020	Independiente	86	(2)
2020–2021	Elche	9	(0)
2021	Estudiantes	31	(1)
2022–2023	Colón	16	(0)
2023	Lanús	23	(0)
2024	Tigre	8	(0)
- * Club domestic league appearances and goals as of 13:48, 15 April 2024 (UTC)

Juan Manuel Sánchez Miño (born 1 January 1990) is an Argentine former professional footballer who played as a left-back or winger.

He holds an Italian passport.

== Career ==
=== Boca Juniors ===
Sánchez Miño began his playing career in 2004, when he arrived as a teenager in the youth sector of Boca Juniors. He made his official debut for the Xeneizes in 2010 against Quilmes. It was not until 2012 when, entering often as a substitute, he gained recognition during a very good season that included his first goal in the local league, against San Lorenzo, and three goals at the 2012 Copa Libertadores: against Arsenal de Sarandí, against Fluminense on 11 April, and against Universidad de Chile on 14 June in the semifinal.

=== Torino ===
He took part in Torino's pre-season retreat in July 2014, however, his signing was delayed following problems over the players passport, with Torino having already filled their non-EU squad quota. This was resolved, as he received an Italian passport in August, through a confirmed Italian ancestry in Soveria Mannelli, a Calabrian region of southern Italy. On 9 August 2014 Torino officially announced they had signed Sánchez Miño for an undisclosed fee from Boca Juniors. He debuted in Serie A on 1 September 2014 in Torino-Inter, 0–0.

=== Elche ===
On 15 September 2020, Sánchez Miño joined La Liga newcomers Elche CF. On 1 February 2021, Elche and Sánchez parted-ways, making Sánchez Miño a free-agent.

=== Estudiantes de La Plata ===
On 17 February 2021, Sánchez Miño returned to Argentina and signed with Argentine Primera División side Estudiantes de La Plata.

=== Colón ===
In January 2022, Sánchez moved to fellow league club Colón on a deal until the end of 2023.

=== Tigre ===
In May 2024, Sánchez terminated his contract with Tigre.

== Style of play ==
He can play as a left-back or a left-sided winger. He combines good pace with the ability to move into channels, as well as a strong left foot.

== Career statistics ==
=== Club ===
Updated 1 January 2015.

Team	Season	League		Cup		Continental^{1}		Other		Total	
Team	Season	Apps	Goals	Apps	Goals	Apps	Goals	Apps	Goals	Apps	Goals
Boca Juniors	2010–11	4	0	0	0	0	0	–		4	0
Boca Juniors	2011–12	21	1	5	0	8	3	–		34	4
Boca Juniors	2012–13	23	1	2	0	6	1	–		31	2
Boca Juniors	2013–14	31	4	–		–		–		31	4
Boca Juniors	Total	79	6	7	0	14	4	0	0	100	10
Torino	2014–15	11	0	0	0	4	0	–		15	0
Career Total		79	6	7	0	14	4	0	0	100	10

^{1}Continental competitions include the Copa Libertadores, the Copa Sudamericana and the UEFA Cup / UEFA Europa League
