= Nicolás Domingo =

Argentine footballer (born 1985)

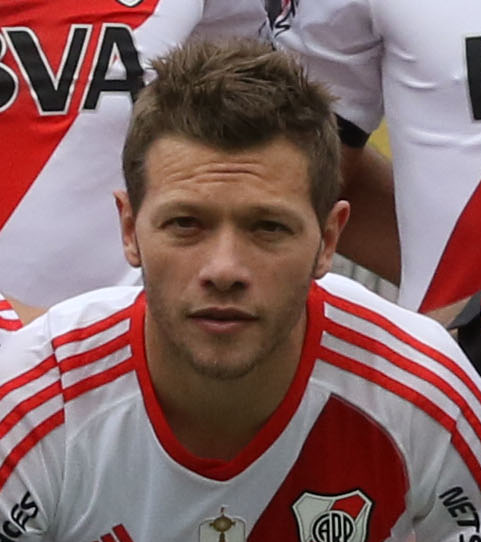

Personal information
- Full name: Nicolás Mario Domingo
- Date of birth: 8 April 1985 (age 41)
- Place of birth: Totoras, Argentina
- Height: 1.74 m (5 ft 9 in)
- Position: Midfielder

Team information
- Current team: Temperley (manager)

Youth career
- River Plate

Senior career*
Years	Team	Apps	(Gls)
2005–2012	River Plate	46	(1)
2008	→ Genoa (loan)	1	(0)
2010	→ Arsenal Sarandí (loan)	3	(0)
2010–2011	→ Peñarol (loan)	17	(0)
2012–2013	Deportivo Cuenca	35	(4)
2013–2015	Banfield	88	(2)
2016	River Plate	13	(1)
2017–2019	Independiente	51	(1)
2020–2021	Olimpia	26	(1)
2021–2023	Banfield	47	(1)
2023–2024	Patronato	34	(0)
2024	Arsenal de Sarandí	36	(2)
Total		397	(13)

Managerial career
- 2026–: Temperley
- * Club domestic league appearances and goals

Nicolás Mario Domingo (born 8 April 1985) is an Argentine football manager and former player who played as a midfielder. He is the current manager of Temperley.

== Career ==
Domingo embarked on his playing career in 2005, making his league debut in a 2–1 home defeat to Gimnasia y Esgrima de La Plata. In 2008, he was loaned to Italian club Genoa but did not make an appearance for the first team.

In 2010 he joined Arsenal de Sarandí, again on loan.

In 2011, he decided to return to River Plate and help the team return to the top flight of Argentine football. River Plate had been recently relegated for the first time in their history.

== Titles ==
Season	Club	Title
Clausura 2008	River Plate	Argentine Primera
