= Juan Manuel Martínez (Argentine footballer) =

Argentine footballer

Personal information
- Full name: Juan Manuel Martínez
- Date of birth: 25 October 1985 (age 41)
- Place of birth: Viedma, Río Negro, Argentina
- Height: 1.77 m (5 ft 10 in)
- Positions: Forward; winger

Team information
- Current team: Almirante Brown

Youth career
- Vélez Sársfield

Senior career*
Years	Team	Apps	(Gls)
2003–2012	Vélez Sársfield	153	(26)
2005–2006	→ Argentinos Jrs. (loan)	13	(1)
2007	→ Cúcuta Deportivo (loan)	9	(2)
2007–2008	→ Al-Shabab (loan)	15	(3)
2012	Corinthians	18	(2)
2013–2015	Boca Juniors	58	(9)
2015–2016	Real Salt Lake	40	(8)
2017	Vélez Sársfield	12	(1)
2017–2018	Independiente	9	(0)
2018–2019	Agropecuario	7	(0)
2019–2021	Almagro	59	(10)
2022	Almirante Brown	5	(0)

International career
2011–2012	Argentina	4	(1)
- * Club domestic league appearances and goals as of 2 July 2022

Juan Manuel Martínez (born October 25, 1985), nicknamed Burrito (in English, "Little Donkey"), is an Argentine footballer who plays as a forward for Almirante Brown. He also holds a Portuguese passport.

== Club career ==
Martínez started playing for Vélez Sársfield on October 1, 2003, in a 2–1 win over Talleres de Córdoba, for the Clausura tournament. Later, he was part of the 2005 Clausura winning squad, playing 13 games and scoring 1 goal. The goal he scored was Vélez's first in that championship, in the fourth match day victory over Lanús (2–1).

After his first period at Vélez, Martínez was loaned to Argentinos Juniors. With his new team, he played 10 games during the 2005 Apertura, suffering a knee injury in the 11th fixture that left him out for almost the entire rest of the season. He returned for the last game of the 2006 Clausura, coming on as a substitute on a 1–0 victory over Colón.

In 2007, after a half-a-year period back at Vélez, Martínez was loaned to Colombian club Cúcuta Deportivo. With the team, he was part of the Copa Libertadores semifinalist campaign. Subsequently, he spent the 2007–08 season on loan at Al-Shabab Riyadh in Saudi Arabia.

Martínez returned to Vélez Sársfield for the 2008–09 Argentine Primera División season. Upon his return, he won the Argentine league for the second time, by being part of the 2009 Clausura squad. The forward played 9 games and scored 1 goal during the tournament (against Colón in a 4–2 away win, helping the team come back from a 0–2). He ended the tournament as a starter after replacing injured Jonathan Cristaldo for the last two games, against Lanús and Huracán, which defined the championship.

Up until the 2010 Apertura, Martínez had scored 6 goals in 91 league games for the club, and had never been a regular starter. However, in that Apertura he started in all 19 games, scoring 10 goals. He also achieved his first hat-trick in Argentina, in Vélez' 6–0 victory over Colón in the 10th fixture. Moreover, his last goal of the championship, in the 2–0 away victory over Racing, was defined by various sources as "Maradona styled". Martínez dribbled with the ball from behind the half-way line, passing 6 rival players in the process, to finally beat the opposing goalkeeper. His team finished the tournament as runner-up to Estudiantes de La Plata.

Due to his performances throughout 2010, Martínez was selected by the Argentine Sports Journalists Circle as the best player of the Argentine league for that year, therefore sharing the Footballer of the Year of Argentina award with Lionel Messi (best Argentine playing abroad). In January 2011, the striker renewed his contract with Vélez until June 2013.

In 2012, after Corinthians won the 2012 Copa Libertadores they hired Juan Manuel Martínez, however he did not feature regularly for team. He entered for a few minutes in the match against Chelsea F.C. in the 2012 FIFA Club World Cup.

Martínez joined Boca Juniors in January 2013. Martínez was injured for much of the beginning of the 2015 season. As a result, he had fallen down the squad depth chart. By early July Martínez wanted to contribute to the squad but found it increasingly difficult to do so. With Tevez's return to Boca being the final straw, he approached the Boca front office and asked for his contract to be rescinded. Martínez trained with Vélez Sarsfield as he worked to sign with a new club during the summer of 2015.

On 13 August 2015, Martínez joined Real Salt Lake as a Designated Player.

Martínez and Salt Lake agreed to mutually terminate his contract at the club on 7 December 2016.

On 18 January 2019, Martínez joined Club Almagro. After three years at Almagro, Martínez moved to fellow league club Almirante Brown in February 2022.

== International career ==
In November 2010, Martínez participated in the Argentina national team that solely consisted of Argentine League players. They trained twice a week and had friendly matches leading up to the 2011 Copa América.

The striker received his first call-up by coach Sergio Batista on January 25, 2011, for a friendly match against Portugal. He was brought down in the penalty area during injury time to win a penalty for his side from which Messi scored the winner.

=== International appearances and goals ===
#	Date	Venue	Opponent	Final score	Goal	Result	Competition
1.	9 February 2011	Geneva, Switzerland	Portugal	2–1	0	Win	Friendly
2.	14 September 2011	Córdoba, Argentina	Brazil	0–0	0	Draw	2011 Superclásico de las Américas
3.	19 September 2012	Goiânia, Brazil	Brazil	1–2	1	Loss	2012 Superclásico de las Américas
4.	21 November 2012	Buenos Aires, Argentina	Brazil	2–1	0	Win	2012 Superclásico de las Américas

== Career statistics ==
As of match played 2 July 2022

Appearances and goals by club, season and competition
Club	Season	League			Cup		Continental		Other		Total	
Club	Season	Division	Apps	Goals	Apps	Goals	Apps	Goals	Apps	Goals	Apps	Goals
Vélez Sársfield	2003–04	Argentine Primera División	23	1	—		0	0	—		23	1
Vélez Sársfield	2004–05	Argentine Primera División	20	1	—		—		—		20	1
Vélez Sársfield	2006–07	Argentine Primera División	3	0	—		—		—		3	0
Vélez Sársfield	2008–09	Argentine Primera División	24	3	—		—		—		27	7
Vélez Sársfield	2009–10	Argentine Primera División	22	2	—		12	1	—		34	3
Vélez Sársfield	2010–11	Argentine Primera División	37	13	—		13	3	—		50	16
Vélez Sársfield	2011–12	Argentine Primera División	24	6	—		16	3	—		40	9
Vélez Sársfield	Total		153	26	—		41	7	—		194	33
Argentinos Juniors (loan)	2005–06	Argentine Primera División	13	1	—		—		—		13	1
Cúcuta (loan)	2007	Categoría Primera A	9	2	—		11	4	—		20	6
Al-Shabab (loan)	2007–08	Saudi Premier League	19	3	7	4	—		—		26	7
Corinthians	2012	Série A	18	2	—		—		1	0	19	2
Boca Juniors	2012–13	Argentine Primera División	12	1	—		9	1	—		21	2
Boca Juniors	2013–14	Argentine Primera División	30	3	—		5	0	—		30	3
Boca Juniors	2014	Argentine Primera División	9	3	1	0	5	0	—		15	3
Boca Juniors	2015	Argentine Primera División	7	2	—		5	2	—		12	4
Boca Juniors	Total		58	9	1	0	19	3	—		78	12
Real Salt Lake	2015	Major League Soccer	8	1	—		2	1	—		10	2
Real Salt Lake	2016	Major League Soccer	32	7	2	1	2	0	1	0	37	8
Real Salt Lake	Total		40	8	2	1	4	1	1	0	47	10
Vélez Sarsfield	2016–17	Argentine Primera División	12	1	—		3	1	—		15	2
Independiente	2017–18	Argentine Primera División	9	0	1	0	1	0	0	0	11	2
Agropecuario	2018–19	Primera B Nacional	8	0	—		—		—		8	0
Almagro	2018–19	Primera B Nacional	14	6	1	0	—		—		15	6
Almagro	2019–20	Primera Nacional	20	3	3	1	—		—		23	4
Almagro	2020	Primera Nacional	7	0	—		—		—		7	0
Almagro	2021	Primera Nacional	18	1	—		—		—		18	1
Almagro	Total		59	10	4	1	—		—		63	11
Almirante Brown	2022	Primera Nacional	5	0	—		—		—		5	0
Career total			403	62	15	6	79	16	2	0	499	84

== Honours ==
Vélez Sársfield

- Argentine Primera División: 2005 Clausura, 2009 Clausura, 2011 Clausura

Corinthians

- FIFA Club World Cup: 2012

Individual

- Footballer of the Year of Argentina: 2010
