= Roddy Zambrano =

Ecuadorian football referee

- Full name: Roddy Alberto Zambrano Olmedo
- Born: 3 February 1978 (age 48); Manabí Province, Ecuador

Domestic
| Years | League | Role |

International
| Years | League | Role |
| 2012– | FIFA listed | Referee |

Roddy Alberto Zambrano Olmedo (born 3 February 1978) is an Ecuadorian professional football referee. He has been a full international for FIFA since 2012. He refereed matches in Copa Libertadores and at the 2019 Copa America.
