= Leandro Fernández (footballer, born 1991) =

Argentine footballer

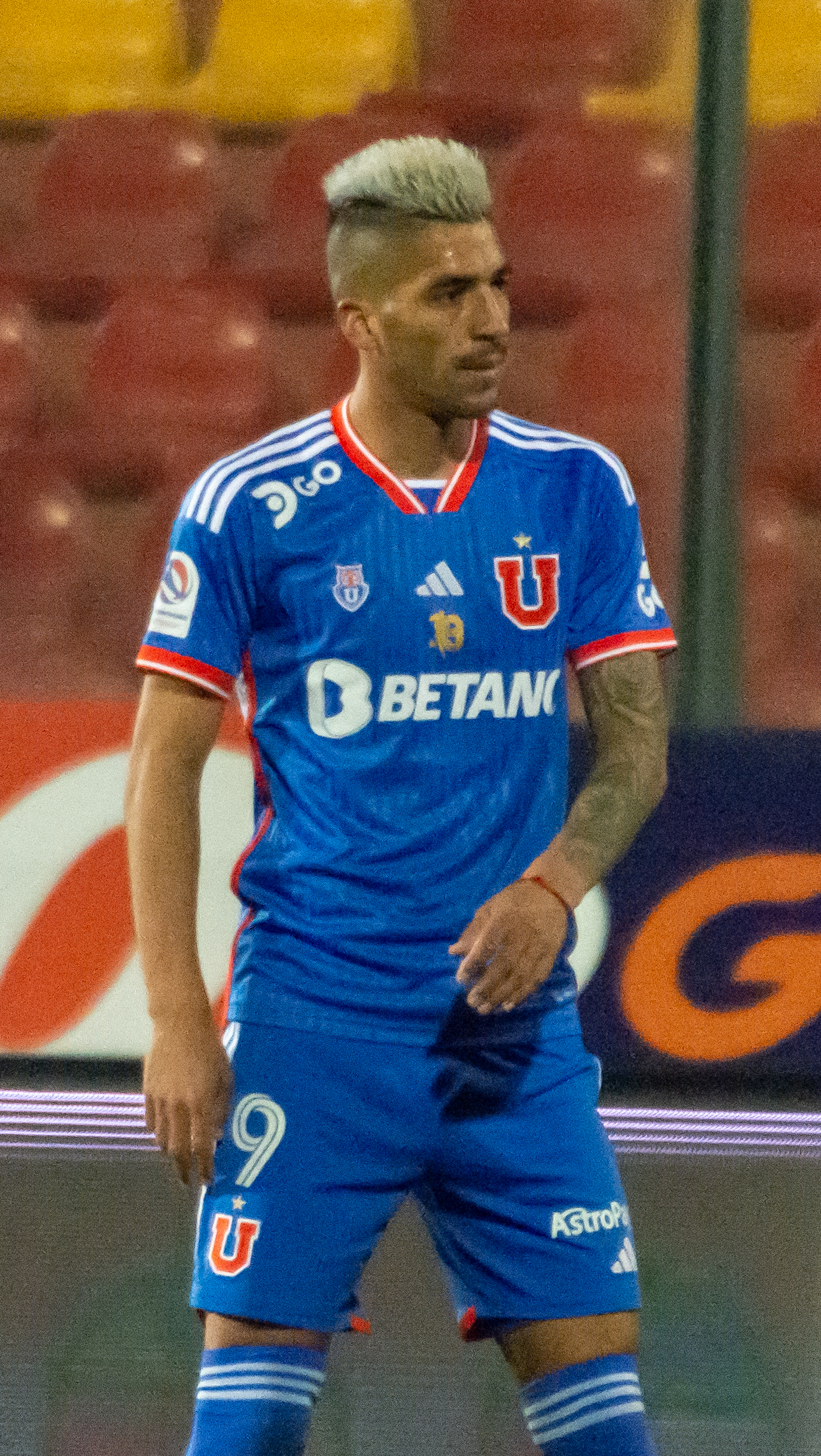
- Fernández with Universidad de Chile in 2023

Personal information
- Full name: Leandro Miguel Fernández
- Date of birth: 12 March 1991 (age 35)
- Place of birth: Santa Fe, Argentina
- Height: 1.78 m (5 ft 10 in)
- Position: Forward

Team information
- Current team: Defensa y Justicia
- Number: 9

Youth career
- Defensa y Justicia

Senior career*
Years	Team	Apps	(Gls)
2009–2012	Defensa y Justicia	51	(9)
2012	Tijuana	7	(0)
2012–2013	Ferro Carril Oeste	20	(2)
2013–2014	Defensa y Justicia	1	(0)
2014	→ Comunicaciones (loan)	22	(4)
2014–2016	Godoy Cruz	42	(20)
2016–2020	Independiente	42	(22)
2019	→ Vélez Sarsfield (loan)	21	(4)
2020–2021	Internacional	9	(0)
2021	→ Nacional (loan)	24	(7)
2022–2023	Independiente	21	(7)
2023–2026	Universidad de Chile	76	(28)
2026	Argentinos Juniors	7	(0)
2026–	Defensa y Justicia	1	(0)
- * Club domestic league appearances and goals as of 17:34, 25 July 2026 (UTC)

Leandro Miguel Fernández (born 12 March 1991) is an Argentine footballer who plays as a forward for Defensa y Justicia.

== Career ==
Born in Santa Fe, Fernández began his career at Defensa y Justicia. He made his debut on 23 May 2009, as a 74th-minute substitute for Omar Zalazar in a 2–1 loss at Tiro Federal, and made two further substitute appearances that season in Primera B Nacional. He went on to score three goals apiece in each of the three subsequent campaigns, including a brace on 8 May 2010 in a 4–0 win at Gimnasia Jujuy. On 21 August 2011, he was sent off in a 3–2 loss at Patronato.

In early 2012, he was loaned to Club Tijuana in the Liga MX. He made seven appearances, without scoring, and spoke of the effects of altitude on his play after his debut on 5 February in a 1–1 draw at Puebla. For the following season, he was loaned to Ferro Carril Oeste, also of Primera B.

On 2 January 2014, Fernández was loaned for a third time, to CSD Comunicaciones in Guatemala. On 29 January, he was provoked by opponents from CD Malacateco and substituted in the first half, causing him to vandalise furniture in the changing room.

Fernández spent three years with Universidad de Chile from 2023 to 2025. Back to Argentina, he signed with Argentinos Juniors on 14 January 2026.

== Personal life ==
Fernández has four footballing brothers: Brian Fernández, Nicolás Fernández, Juan Cruz Villagra and Tomás Villagra; the latter two took their mother's surname.

== Honours ==
Comunicaciones

- Guatemalan Liga Nacional: 2013–14 Clausura

Independiente

- Copa Sudamericana: 2017
- J.League Cup / Copa Sudamericana Championship: 2018

Nacional

- Uruguayan Primera División: 2020
- Supercopa Uruguaya: 2021
- Torneo Intermedio: 2020

Universidad de Chile

- Copa Chile: 2024
