= 2018–19 Club Atlético Independiente season =

Club Atlético Independiente
2018–19 season
- President: Hugo Moyano
- Manager: Ariel Holan
- Stadium: Estadio Libertadores de América
- Primera División: 7th
- Copa Argentina: Round of 32
- Copa Libertadores: Quarterfinals
- Suruga Bank Championship: Winners
- Top goalscorer: League: Emmanuel Gigliotti (12); All: Emmanuel Gigliotti (12)
Home colours	Away colours	Third colours

The 2018–19 season was Club Atlético Independiente's 6th consecutive season in the top-flight of Argentine football. The season covers the period from 20 July 2018 to 30 June 2019.

== Current squad ==
As of 1 September 2018

Note: Flags indicate national team as defined under FIFA eligibility rules; some limited exceptions apply. Players may hold more than one non-FIFA nationality.

No.	Pos.	Nation	Player
2	DF	ARG	Alan Franco
3	DF	ARG	Guillermo Burdisso
4	DF	ARG	Jorge Figal
5	MF	ARG	Nicolás Domingo
6	MF	ARG	Juan Sánchez Miño
7	FW	ARG	Martín Benítez
8	MF	ARG	Maximiliano Meza
9	FW	ARG	Emmanuel Gigliotti
10	MF	ECU	Fernando Gaibor
11	FW	ARG	Leandro Fernández
12	GK	ARG	Gonzalo Rehak
13	GK	ARG	Milton Álvarez
14	DF	VEN	Fernando Amorebieta
15	DF	ARG	Gonzalo Asis

No.	Pos.	Nation	Player
16	DF	ARG	Fabricio Bustos
17	FW	ARG	Braian Romero
18	FW	ARG	Silvio Romero
19	MF	CHI	Pedro Pablo Hernández
20	MF	URU	Gastón Silva
21	MF	URU	Carlos Benavídez
22	MF	CHI	Francisco Silva
23	DF	ARG	Emanuel Brítez
24	DF	ARG	Sergio Barreto
25	GK	URU	Martín Campaña (captain)
26	FW	ARG	Ezequiel Cerutti
28	MF	ARG	Diego Mercado
29	FW	ARG	Francisco Pizzini
30	FW	ARG	Gonzalo Verón
31	GK	ARG	Renzo Rodríguez Bacchia

=== Out on loan ===
Note: Flags indicate national team as defined under FIFA eligibility rules; some limited exceptions apply. Players may hold more than one non-FIFA nationality.

No.	Pos.	Nation	Player
—	MF	ARG	Julián Vitale (at San Martín de Tucumán until 31 December 2018)
—	MF	ARG	Lucas Villalba (at Aldosivi until 31 December 2018)
21	MF	ARG	Domingo Blanco (at Defensa y Justicia until 31 December 2018)
19	FW	ARG	Gastón Togni (at Defensa y Justicia until 31 December 2018)
-	FW	ARG	Lucas Albertengo (at Estudiantes (LP) until 31 December 2018)
—	MF	ARG	Jorge Ortiz (at Belgrano)
—	FW	ARG	Mauricio del Castillo (at Defensores de Belgrano)

No.	Pos.	Nation	Player
—	FW	ARG	Nicolás Messiniti (at San Martín)
—	DF	ARG	Sergio Ojeda (at Olimpo)
—	MF	ARG	Walter Erviti (at Alvarado)
—	DF	ARG	Damián Martínez (at Unión Santa Fe)
—	FW	ARG	Gastón del Castillo (at Arsenal de Sarandí)
—	DF	ARG	Gustavo Toledo (at Colón)
—	FW	ARG	Jonathan Menéndez (at (Qatar) Al-Rayyan SC)

== Transfers ==
=== In ===
Date	Pos.	Player	Age	Moving from	Type	Fee	Notes	Source
	GK	(Argentina) Milton Álvarez	37	(Argentina) Deportivo Morón	Transfer	$150,000		
	DF	(Argentina) Guillermo Burdisso	38	(Mexico) Club León	Free Agent	Free		
	MF	(Argentina) Juan Manuel Trejo	34	(Argentina) Quilmes	Loan returns	Free		
	DF	(Argentina) Lucas Villalba	32	(Argentina) Huracán	Loan returns	Free		
	MF	(Argentina) Franco Bellocq	32	(Argentina) Olimpo	Loan returns	Free		
	DF	(Argentina) Julián Vitale	31	(Argentina) Unión de Santa Fe	Loan returns	Free		
	MF	(Uruguay) Carlos Benavidez	38	(Uruguay) Defensor Sporting	Transfer (60%)	$2,500,000		
	MF	(Chile) Francisco Silva	40	(Mexico) Cruz Azul	Loan returns	Free		
	MF	(Chile) Pedro Pablo Hernández	39	(Spain) RC Celta de Vigo	Transfer	$1,200,000		
	FW	(Argentina) Francisco Pizzini	33	(Argentina) Olimpo	Loan returns	Free		
	FW	(Argentina) Nicolás Messiniti	30	(Argentina) San Martín (SJ)	Loan returns	Free		
	FW	(Argentina) Lucas Albertengo	35	(Mexico) C.F. Monterrey	Loan returns	Free		
	FW	(Argentina) Ezequiel Cerutti	34	(Saudi Arabia) Al-Hilal	Transfer			

=== Out ===
Date	Pos.	Player	Age	Moving to	Type	Fee	Notes	Source
	GK	(Argentina) Damián Albil	47	Free agent	Release	Free		
	DF	(Argentina) Rodrigo Moreira	30	(Argentina) San Martín de Tucumán	Release	Free		
	MF	(Argentina) Juan Manuel Trejo	34	(Argentina) San Martín de Tucumán	Release	Free		
	DF	(Argentina) Lucas Villalba	32	(Argentina) Aldosivi	Loan out	Free		
	MF	(Argentina) Franco Bellocq	32	(Greece) Asteras Tripolis	Release	Free		
	MF	(Uruguay) Diego Martín Rodríguez	37	(Mexico) Club Tijuana	Transfer	$1,000,000		
	MF	(Argentina) Julián Vitale	31	(Argentina) San Martín de Tucumán	Loan out	Free		
	MF	(Argentina) Domingo Blanco	31	(Argentina) Defensa y Justicia	Loan out	Free		
	FW	(Argentina) Gastón Togni	31	(Argentina) Defensa y Justicia	Loan out	Free		
	MF	(Argentina) Jonás Gutiérrez	43	(Argentina) Defensa y Justicia	Release	Free		
	FW	(Argentina) Juan Manuel Martínez	40	Free agent	Release	Free		
	FW	(Argentina) Lucas Albertengo	35	(Argentina) Estudiantes (LP)	Release	Free		
	FW	(Argentina) Jonathan Menéndez	32	(Qatar) Al-Rayyan SC	Loan out	Free		

== Pre-season and friendlies ==
=== Friendlies ===
Win Draw Loss

12 July 2018 Friendly	Independiente (Argentina)	4–0	(Argentina) UAI Urquiza
	Fernando Gaibor; Pedro Pablo Hernández; Braian Romero; Silvio Romero

12 July 2018 Friendly	Independiente (Argentina)	3–0	(Argentina) UAI Urquiza
	Emmanuel Gigliotti; Sergio Barreto; Mauro Molina

== Competitions ==
Competition	First match	Last match	Starting round	Final position	Record							
Competition	First match	Last match	Starting round	Final position	Pld	W	D	L	GF	GA	GD	Win %
Primera División	10 August 2018	8 April 2019	Matchday 1	N/A	3	0	2	1	4	5	−1	0.00
Copa Argentina 2017–18	20 July 2017	N/A	Round of 64	Round of 32	2	1	0	1	8	0	+8	50.00
Copa Argentina 2018–19	N/A	N/A	Round of 64	N/A	0	0	0	0	0	0	+0	—
Copa Libertadores	21 August 2018	N/A	Round of 16	N/A	2	1	1	0	3	0	+3	50.00
2019 Copa Sudamericana	19 March 2019	N/A	First stage	N/A	0	0	0	0	0	0	+0	—
Suruga Bank	8 August 2018		Final	Winners	1	1	0	0	1	0	+1	100.00
Total					8	3	3	2	16	5	+11	37.50

Last updated: 24 February 2019.
Source: Competitions

=== Primera División ===
==== Standings ====
Pos	Team	Pld	W	D	L	GF	GA	GD	Pts	Qualification
5	Atlético Tucumán	25	12	6	7	36	29	+7	42	Qualification for Copa Libertadores second stage
6	Vélez Sarsfield	25	11	7	7	34	25	+9	40	Qualification for Copa Sudamericana first stage
7	Independiente	25	10	8	7	35	28	+7	38	Qualification for Copa Sudamericana first stage
8	Unión	25	9	9	7	29	24	+5	36	Qualification for Copa Sudamericana first stage
9	Tigre	25	9	9	7	39	42	−3	36	Qualification for Copa Libertadores group stage (Note: Tigre qualified for the Copa Libertadores group stage by winning the 2019 Copa de la Superliga.)

Source: AFA
Rules for classification: 1) points; 2) play-off (only if needed to decide championship); 3) goal difference; 4) goals scored; 5) head-to-head points; 6) head-to-head goal difference; 7) head-to-head goals scored.

==== Matches ====
11 August 2018 1	Independiente	4–0	San Martín de Tucumán	Avellaneda
21:45 ART	Hernàndez 26'; Gaibor 79'; Romero 90'; Gigliotti 90+3'	Report		Stadium: Estadio Libertadores de América; Referee: Facundo Tello

18 August 2018 2	Newell's Old Boys	2–2	Independiente	Rosario
21:45 ART	Fértoli 15'; Fontanini 52'; Leonel Ferroni (yellow card) 59'; Amoroso (red card) 67'; Braian Rivero (yellow card) 85'	Report	Gigliotti 3', 43'; Sánchez Miño (yellow card) 20'; Silva (yellow card) 49'; Meza (yellow card) 54'; Domingo (yellow card) 86'	Stadium: Estadio Marcelo Bielsa; Referee: Mauro Vigliano

25 August 2018 3	Independiente	0–1	Defensa y Justicia	Avellaneda
21:45 ART	Gaibor (yellow card) 28'; Domingo (yellow card) 46'	Report	Fernández 34'; Blanco (yellow card) 41'; Hugo Silva (yellow card) 72'; Togni (yellow card) 87'	Stadium: Estadio Libertadores de América; Referee: Jorge Baliño

2 September 2018 4	Estudiantes (LP)	2–2	Independiente	Quilmes
13:15 ART	Apaolaza 7'; Matías Pellegrini 26', (yellow card) 51'; Lugüercio (yellow card) 28'; Iván Erquiaga (yellow card) 36'; Zuqui (yellow card) 72'; Pavone (yellow card) 86'		Figal (red card) 72'; B.Romero 49', (yellow card) 62'; S.Romero 56'; Bustos (yellow card) 67'; Silva (yellow card) 72'; Hernández (yellow card) 90+1'	Stadium: Estadio Centenario Ciudad de Quilmes; Referee: Ariel Penel

15 September 2018 5	Independiente	3–0	Colón	Avellaneda
				Stadium: Estadio Libertadores de América

22 September 2018 6	Banfield	1–1	Independiente	Banfield
				Stadium: Estadio Florencio Sola

28 September 2018 7	Independiente	0–0	Tigre	Avellaneda
				Stadium: Estadio Libertadores de América

6 October 2018 8	Patronato	1–2	Independiente	Paraná
				Stadium: Estadio Presbítero Bartolomé Grella

21 October 2018 9	Independiente	3–1	Huracán	Avellaneda
				Stadium: Estadio Libertadores de América

28 October 2018 10	Atlético Tucumán	4–2	Independiente	San Miguel de Tucumán
				Stadium: Estadio Monumental José Fierro

4 November 2018 11	Argentinos Juniors	0–2	Independiente	Buenos Aires
				Stadium: Estadio Diego Armando Maradona

11 November 2018 12	Independiente	2–1	Belgrano de Córdoba	Avellaneda
				Stadium: Estadio Libertadores de América

27 November 2018 13	Lanús	1–0	Independiente	Lanús
				Stadium: Estadio La Fortaleza

2 December 2018 14	Independiente	0–1	Boca Juniors	Avellaneda
				Stadium: Estadio Libertadores de América

9 December 2018 15	Godoy Cruz	1–1	Independiente	Mendoza
				Stadium: Estadio Malvinas Argentinas

27 January 2019 16	Independiente	1–1	Talleres de Córdoba	Avellaneda
				Stadium: Estadio Libertadores de América

2 February 2019 17	San Lorenzo	0–0	Independiente	Buenos Aires
				Stadium: El Nuevo Gasómetro

9 February 2019 18	Independiente	2–1	Unión (SF)	Avellaneda
				Stadium: Estadio Libertadores de América

17 February 2019 19	San Martín (SJ)	1–1	Independiente	San Juan
				Stadium: Estadio Ingeniero Hilario Sánchez

23 February 2019 20	Independiente	1–3	Racing Club	Avellaneda
	Gaibor 45+3'	Report	Burdisso 5' (Own Goal#Association Football); López 54' (pen.); Zaracho 90+4'	Stadium: Estadio Libertadores de América; Referee: Néstor Pitana

4 March 2019 21	Gimnasia (LP)	1–0	Independiente	La Plata
				Stadium: El Bosque

10 March 2019 22	Independiente	2–0	Aldosivi	Avellaneda
				Stadium: Estadio Libertadores de América

17 March 2019 23	River Plate	3–0	Independiente	Buenos Aires
				Stadium: Estadio Monumental

30 March 2019 24	Independiente	2–1	Vélez Sarsfield	Avellaneda
				Stadium: Estadio Libertadores de América

7 April 2019 25	Rosario Central	1–2	Independiente	Rosario
				Stadium: Estadio Gigante de Arroyito

=== 2017–18 Copa Argentina ===
Win Draw Loss

==== Round of 64 ====
20 July 2018 R64	Independiente	8–0	Central Ballester	Formosa, Argentina
21:10 ART	Benítez 7', 52', 63'; Fernando Gaibor 13'; Silvio Romero 16', 71'; Meza 46' (pen.); Carlos Benavídez 88'			Stadium: Estadio Antonio Romero; Referee: Pablo Echavarría

==== Round of 32 ====
10 September 2018 R32	Independiente	1–1 (3–4 p)	Brown de Adrogué	Lanús
21:10 ART				Stadium: Estadio Ciudad de Lanús – Néstor Díaz Pérez; Referee: Nicolás Lamolina

=== 2018 Copa Libertadores ===
==== Round of 16 ====
21 August 2018 Leg 1	Independiente (Argentina)	3–0; Awarded	(Brazil) Santos	Avellaneda, Argentina
21:45 ART	Silva (yellow card) 25'; Bustos (yellow card) 27'; Cerutti (yellow card) 48'; Campaña (yellow card) 72'; Silva (yellow card) 90'	Report	Sánchez (yellow card) 19'; Veríssimo (yellow card) 30'; Dodô (red card) 82'; Gabriel (yellow card) 90'	Stadium: Estadio Libertadores de América; Referee: (Peru) Diego Haro

28 August 2018 Leg 2	Santos (Brazil)	0–0	(Argentina) Independiente	São Paulo, Brazil
19:30 BRT	Derlis González (yellow card) 39'; Henrique (yellow card) 57'; Alison (yellow card) 59'	Report	Bustos (yellow card) 15'; Meza (penalty missed) 45; Emanuel Brítez (yellow card) 54'	Stadium: Estádio Urbano Caldeira; Attendance: 33,642; Referee: (Chile) Julio Bascuñán

Independiente won 3–0 on aggregate

==== Quarterfinals ====
19 September 2018 Leg 1	Independiente (Argentina)	0–0	(Argentina) River Plate	Avellaneda, Argentina
19:30 ART				Stadium: Estadio Libertadores de América; Referee: Wilton Sampaio (Brazil)

2 October 2018 Leg 2	River Plate (Argentina)	3–1	(Argentina) Independiente	Buenos Aires
19:30 ART				Stadium: Estadio Monumental; Referee: Anderson Daronco (Brazil)

River Plate won 3–1 on aggregate

=== Copa Sudamericana ===
Win Draw Loss

==== First stage ====
3 April 2019 First stage	Independiente (Argentina)	4–1	(Peru) Binacional	Avellaneda
21:30 UTC-3				Stadium: Estadio Libertadores de América

1 May 2019 First stage	Binacional (Peru)	1–2	(Argentina) Independiente	Juliaca
19:30 UTC-5				Stadium: Estadio Guillermo Briceño Rosamedina

=== Suruga Bank Championship ===
8 August 2018 Suruga	Cerezo Osaka (Japan)	0 – 1	(Argentina) Independiente	Osaka, Japan
19:00 UTC+9			Silvio Romero 28'; Gigliotti (yellow card) 90+2'	Stadium: Yanmar Stadium Nagai; Attendance: 10,035; Referee: (New Zealand) Matthew Conger
