= Fabricio Bustos =

Argentine footballer (born 1996)

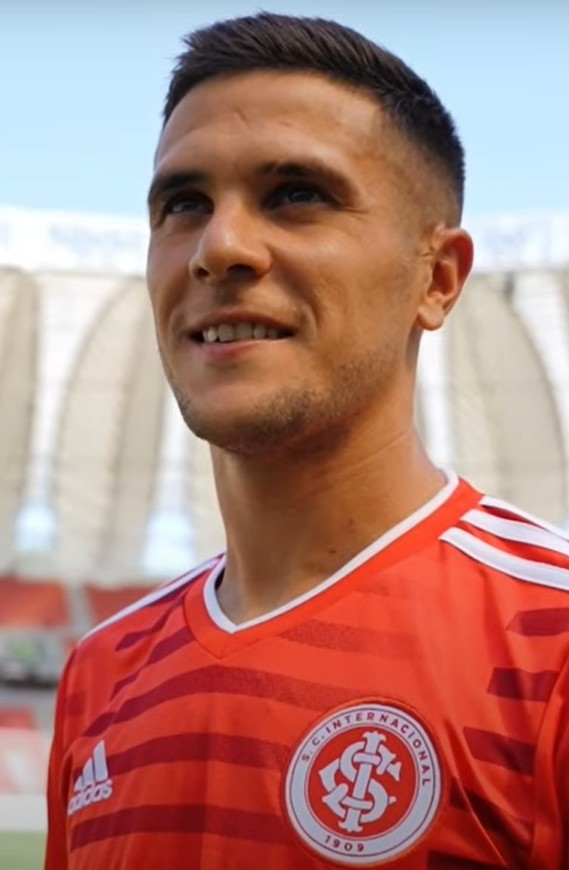
- Bustos playing for Internacional in 2022

Personal information
- Full name: Fabricio Tomás Bustos Sein
- Date of birth: 28 April 1996 (age 30)
- Place of birth: Ucacha, Argentina
- Height: 1.67 m (5 ft 6 in)
- Position: Right-back

Team information
- Current team: Coritiba
- Number: 14

Youth career
- Jorge Newbery
- 2008–2016: Independiente

Senior career*
Years	Team	Apps	(Gls)
2016–2022	Independiente	173	(5)
2022–2024	Internacional	101	(1)
2024–2026	River Plate	38	(0)
2026–	Coritiba	0	(0)

International career^{‡}
2013	Argentina U17	7	(0)
2014	Argentina U20	1	(0)
2018	Argentina	4	(0)
- * Club domestic league appearances and goals as of 17:52, 10 July 2026 (UTC) ‡ National team caps and goals as of 9 December 2018

Fabricio Tomás Bustos Sein (born 28 April 1996) is an Argentine professional footballer who plays for Coritiba. Primarily a right-back, he can also operate as a right-midfielder.

== Club career ==
Born in Ucacha, Córdoba, Bustos first playing years were with local club Jorge Newbery. In 2008, he joined Independiente.

In 2016, Bustos was promoted to the senior squad by coach Gabriel Milito. He made his full professional debut on 5 December 2016, in a 1–0 home win over River Plate. He eventually secured a regular spot in the team, ending the 2016–17 season with an overall of 19 appearances.

In 2022, Bustos signed with Internacional.

On 9 August 2024, Bustos signed with River Plate.

== International career ==
Bustos was a member of the Argentine under-17 side that were crowned champions of the 2013 South American Under-17 Championship, appearing in 7 matches. In 2014, he made an appearance for the under-20 side, in a friendly against Ecuador.

On 27 August 2017, Bustos received his first senior call-up by coach Jorge Sampaoli for Argentina's 2018 World Cup qualifying matches against Uruguay and Venezuela. He made his debut on 23 March 2018, starting in a friendly against Italy which Argentina won by 2–0.

== Career statistics ==
=== Club ===
As of 15 November 2021.

Club	Season	League			National cup		League cup		Continental		Other		Total	
Club	Season	Division	Apps	Goals	Apps	Goals	Apps	Goals	Apps	Goals	Apps	Goals	Apps	Goals
Independiente	2016–17	Argentine Primera División	19	1	0	0	—		2 (Note: Appearances in Copa Sudamericana)	0	—		21	1
Independiente	2017–18	Argentine Primera División	14	2	0	0	—		15 (Note: Nine appearances in Copa Sudamericana, six appearances in Copa Libertadores)	0	2 (Note: Appearances in Recopa Sudamericana)	0	31	2
Independiente	2018–19	Argentine Primera División	22	0	1	0	1	0	8 (Note: Four appearances in Copa Libertadores, four appearances in Copa Sudamericana)	0	1 (Note: Appearances in Suruga Bank Championship)	0	33	0
Independiente	2019–20	Argentine Primera División	22	0	3	0	1	0	6	0	—		32	0
Independiente	2020–21	Argentine Primera División	7	0	0	0	—		6	0	—		13	0
Independiente	2021	Argentine Primera División	33	2	2	0	—		8	0	—		43	2
Career total			117	5	6	0	2	0	45	0	3	0	173	5

=== International ===
As of match played 11 October 2018.

National team	Year	Apps	Goals
Argentina	2018	4	0
Total		4	0

== Honours ==
Independiente

- Copa Sudamericana: 2017
- Suruga Bank Championship: 2018

Argentina U18

- South American Under-17 Championship: 2013
