= Nicolás Figal =

Argentine footballer

Personal information
- Full name: Jorge Nicolás Figal
- Date of birth: 3 April 1994 (age 32)
- Place of birth: América, Argentina
- Height: 5 ft 11 in (1.80 m)
- Position: Centre-back

Team information
- Current team: Boca Juniors
- Number: 4

Senior career*
Years	Team	Apps	(Gls)
2014–2019	Independiente	82	(2)
2016	→ Olimpo (loan)	16	(1)
2020–2022	Inter Miami	46	(1)
2022–	Boca Juniors	80	(4)
- * Club domestic league appearances and goals as of 17:12, 16 June 2026 (UTC)

Jorge Nicolás Figal (born 3 April 1994) is an Argentine professional footballer who plays as a centre-back for Boca Juniors.

== Club career ==
Figal's career began with then-Primera B Nacional side Independiente in 2014, with his debut for the first-team coming on 4 May against Gimnasia de Jujuy; a match Independiente lost 1–0. Figal made five more appearances in all competitions in his first season with the club as they were promoted into the Primera División. His top division debut came on 10 August 2014 in a 3–0 home victory versus Atlético de Rafaela. Eighteen more appearances came in the rest of 2014 and in the following season, 2015, before he was loaned out to Primera División club Olimpo in February 2016. Figal scored his first pro goal against Rosario Central on 2 April.

He returned to Independiente in June ahead of 2016–17, a campaign that saw him net his first goal for the team in; versus Arsenal de Sarandí on 23 April 2017. Sixty-nine total appearances came in the three seasons following his loan away. After being a part of Independiente's 2017 Copa Sudamericana winning squad, Figal appeared at the following year's Suruga Bank Championship; which they also won, following a win in Japan over Cerezo Osaka.

On 30 January 2020, Figal joined Major League Soccer expansion side Inter Miami CF.

== International career ==
In August 2019, Figal received a senior call-up from Lionel Scaloni for friendlies in the succeeding September against Chile and Mexico in the United States.

== Personal life ==
On 14 September 2017, Figal was banned from football for nine months after failing a drugs test, testing positive for diuretic. The ban was backdated, meaning he was unavailable for selection until 4 January 2018; six months after the announcement. He returned to action on 24 January, playing the full ninety minutes in a draw with Rosario Central.

== Career statistics ==
As of 21 November 2020.

Club statistics
Club	Season	League			Cup		League Cup		Continental		Other		Total	
Club	Season	Division	Apps	Goals	Apps	Goals	Apps	Goals	Apps	Goals	Apps	Goals	Apps	Goals
Independiente	2013–14	Primera B Nacional	3	0	2	0	—		—		0	0	5	0
Independiente	2014	Primera División	13	0	1	0	—		—		0	0	14	0
Independiente	2015	Primera División	5	0	0	0	—		0	0	0	0	5	0
Independiente	2016	Primera División	0	0	0	0	—		0	0	0	0	0	0
Independiente	2016–17	Primera División	19	1	1	0	—		5 (Note: Appearance(s) in the Copa Sudamericana)	0	0	0	25	1
Independiente	2017–18	Primera División	14	0	2	0	—		6 (Note: Appearance(s) in the Copa Libertadores)	0	2 (Note: Appearance(s) in the Recopa Sudamericana)	0	24	0
Independiente	2018–19	Primera División	14	0	4	1	2	0	3	0	1 (Note: Appearance(s) in the Suruga Bank Championship)	0	24	1
Independiente	2019–20	Primera División	14	1	0	0	0	0	4	0	—		18	1
Independiente	Total		82	2	10	1	2	0	18	0	3	0	115	3
Olimpo (loan)	2016	Primera División	16	1	1	0	—		—		0	0	17	1
Inter Miami	2020	Major League Soccer	21	0	—		—		—		1 (Note: Appearance(s) in the MLS Cup Playoffs)	0	22	0
Career total			119	3	11	1	2	0	18	0	4	0	154	4

== Honours ==
Independiente

- Copa Sudamericana: 2017
- Suruga Bank Championship: 2018

Boca Juniors

- Copa Sudamericana: 2026
- Primera División: 2022, 2026 Liga
- Copa de la Liga Profesional: 2022
- Supercopa Argentina: 2022
