= Emmanuel Gigliotti =

Argentine footballer

Personal information
- Full name: Emmanuel Gigliotti
- Date of birth: 20 May 1987 (age 39)
- Place of birth: Buenos Aires, Argentina
- Height: 1.87 m (6 ft 2 in)
- Position: Striker

Team information
- Current team: Colón
- Number: 9

Youth career
- Platense
- Comunicaciones
- Lamadrid

Senior career*
Years	Team	Apps	(Gls)
2006–2007	Lamadrid	37	(13)
2007–2008	Argentinos Juniors	0	(0)
2008–2009	All Boys	34	(16)
2009–2010	Atlético Tucumán	28	(5)
2010–2013	Novara Calcio	7	(1)
2011	→ All Boys (loan)	15	(5)
2011–2012	→ San Lorenzo (loan)	33	(10)
2012–2013	→ Colón (loan)	36	(21)
2013–2015	Boca Juniors	53	(21)
2015	→ Chongqing Lifan (loan)	19	(9)
2016	Chongqing Lifan	37	(15)
2017–2018	Independiente	49	(21)
2019–2021	Toluca	34	(9)
2020–2021	→ León (loan)	33	(9)
2021	León	18	(1)
2022–2023	Nacional	50	(15)
2024	Unión La Calera	17	(3)
2025–	Colón	17	(5)

International career
2011	Argentina	1	(0)
- * Club domestic league appearances and goals as of 18:10, 14 June 2025 (UTC)

Emmanuel Gigliotti (Spanish pronunciation: [eˈmanweʎ ɟʝiˈɣljoti], locally [eˈmanwel ʒiˈɣljoti]; born 20 May 1987) is an Argentine professional footballer who plays as a striker for Colón. He is often known as El Puma (The Puma).

== Club career ==
=== Early career ===
Born in Buenos Aires, Gigliotti represented Platense, Comunicaciones and Lamadrid, making his senior debut with the latter during the 2006–07 season, in Primera C Metropolitana. He contributed with 13 goals in 37 appearances as his side reached the play-offs.

In July 2007, Gigliotti joined Primera División side Argentinos Juniors after impressing in a friendly against the side. A request from Ricardo Caruso Lombardi, he was completely ostracized by new coach Néstor Gorosito and failed to make any appearances for the club.

On 25 July 2008, Gigliotti signed for All Boys of the Primera B Nacional, and finished the season as the club's top scorer and third overall.

=== Atlético Tucumán ===
On 9 August 2009, Gigliotti moved to Atlético Tucumán, newly promoted to the top tier. He made his debut for the club on 3 September, coming on as a late substitute for Juan Pablo Pereyra in a 2–0 away win against Huracán.

On 7 November 2009, in his first start, Gigliotti scored his first top tier goal by netting his team's last in a 4–2 home defeat of Tigre. Seven days later, he netted the opener in a 3–1 loss at River Plate, and finished the campaign with five goals.

=== Novara ===
On 10 July 2010, Gigliotti moved abroad for the first time in his career after joining Serie A side Novara. He made his debut for the club on 15 August 2010, replacing Marco Rigoni late into a 4–1 Coppa Italia home routing of Taranto.

Gigliotti made his debut in the first division of Italian football on 25 September 2010, replacing Cristian Bertani in a 4–1 home routing of Livorno. His first goal abroad came on 27 November, as he netted a last-minute equalizer in a 1–1 away draw against Siena.

On 18 January 2011, Gigliotti returned to his homeland, after agreeing to a six-month loan deal at former side All Boys, now in the first division. On 20 July, he moved to fellow league team San Lorenzo in a temporary one-year deal.

On 12 July 2012, Gigliotti signed a one-year loan deal with Colón, with a buyout clause. With the side, he scored a career-best 21 league goals, being the top scorer of the Torneo Final.

=== Boca Juniors ===
On 4 July 2013, after being heavily linked to Pumas UNAM, Gigliotti signed a three-year contract with Boca Juniors. He made his debut for the club on 13 August, replacing goalscorer Nicolás Blandi in a 3–2 away loss against Newell's Old Boys.

Gigliotti scored his first goal for Boca on 15 September 2013, netting the last in a 2–0 home win against Racing. Late in the month, he scored a brace in a 2–0 home defeat of Quilmes, and netted the game's only in an away success over rivals River Plate on 6 October.

On 27 November 2014, during the year's Copa Sudamericana semifinals, Gigliotti missed a penalty kick in a 1–0 loss against River Plate. After that match, he was demoted to backup option behind new signing Dani Osvaldo.

=== Chongqing Lifan ===
On 28 February 2015, Chinese Super League side Chongqing Lifan announced Gigliotti joined the club for one-year loan deal. On 24 July, after scoring nine goals, he was bought outright by US$ 3 million.

=== Independiente ===
On 20 February 2017, Gigliotti returned to his homeland and was signed by Independiente.

=== Deportivo Toluca ===
On 2 January 2019, Gigliotti was signed by Mexican Toluca.

=== Club León ===
On 18 July 2020, Gigliotti was signed by Mexican León.

=== Club Nacional de Football ===
On 15 January 2022, Gigliotti was signed by Uruguayan Nacional.

=== Unión La Calera ===
In 2024, he moved to Chile and signed with Unión La Calera in the top division.

== International career ==
Gigliotti made his full international debut for Argentina on 14 September 2011, replacing injured Mauro Boselli in a 0–0 home draw against Brazil for the 2011 Superclásico de las Américas.

== Personal life ==
Gigliotti's younger brother Sebastián is also a footballer and a forward.

== Career statistics ==
=== Club ===
As of 15 January 2022

Club	Season	League			Cup		Continental		Other		Total	
Club	Season	Division	Apps	Goals	Apps	Goals	Apps	Goals	Apps	Goals	Apps	Goals
Lamadrid	2006–07	Primera C Metropolitana	37	13	—		—		—		37	13
Argentinos Juniors	2007–08	Primera División	0	0	0	0	—		—		0	0
All Boys	2008–09	Primera B Nacional	34	16	0	0	—		—		34	16
Atlético Tucumán	2009–10	Primera División	28	5	0	0	—		—		28	5
Novara	2010–11	Serie A	7	1	3	0	—		—		10	1
All Boys	2010–11	Primera División	15	5	0	0	—		—		15	5
San Lorenzo	2011–12	Primera División	33	10	1	0	—		2 (Note: Appearance(s) in Relegation playoffs)	0	36	10
Colón	2012–13	Primera División	36	21	1	0	4 (Note: Appearance(s) in Copa Sudamericana)	2	—		41	23
Boca Juniors	2013–14	Primera División	37	16	0	0	—		—		37	16
Boca Juniors	2014	Primera División	16	5	1	0	7	2	—		24	7
Boca Juniors	2015	Primera División	0	0	0	0	1	0	—		1	0
Boca Juniors	Subtotal		53	21	1	0	8	2	—		62	23
Chongqing Lifan	2015	Chinese Super League	30	15	0	0	—		—		30	15
Chongqing Lifan	2016	Chinese Super League	26	9	0	0	—		—		26	9
Chongqing Lifan	Subtotal		56	24	0	0	—		—		56	24
Independiente	2016–17	Primera División	12	4	0	0	2	0	—		14	4
Independiente	2017–18	Primera División	22	5	1	0	11 (Note: Six appearances and four goals in Copa Sudamericana, five appearances and two goals in Copa Libertadores)	6	—		34	11
Independiente	2018–19	Primera División	15	12	2	0	3 (Note: Appearance(s) in Copa Libertadores)	0	2 (Note: One appearance in Recopa Sudamericana, one appearance in Suruga Bank Championship)	0	22	12
Independiente	Subtotal		49	21	3	0	16	6	2	0	70	27
Deportivo Toluca F.C.	2019–20	Liga MX	34	9	3	0	—		—		34	9
Club León	2020–21	Liga MX	27	7	1	0	—		—		27	7
Nacional	2022	Uruguayan Primera División	1	1	0	0	—		1	1	2	2
Total			410	154	13	0	28	10	5	1	391	149

=== International ===
As of 25 January 2017

Argentina
Year	Apps	Goals
2011	1	0
Total	1	0

== Honours ==
Independiente

- Copa Sudamericana: 2017
- Suruga Bank Championship: 2018

León

- Liga MX: Guardianes 2020
- Leagues Cup: 2021
