= Gastón Togni =

Argentine footballer

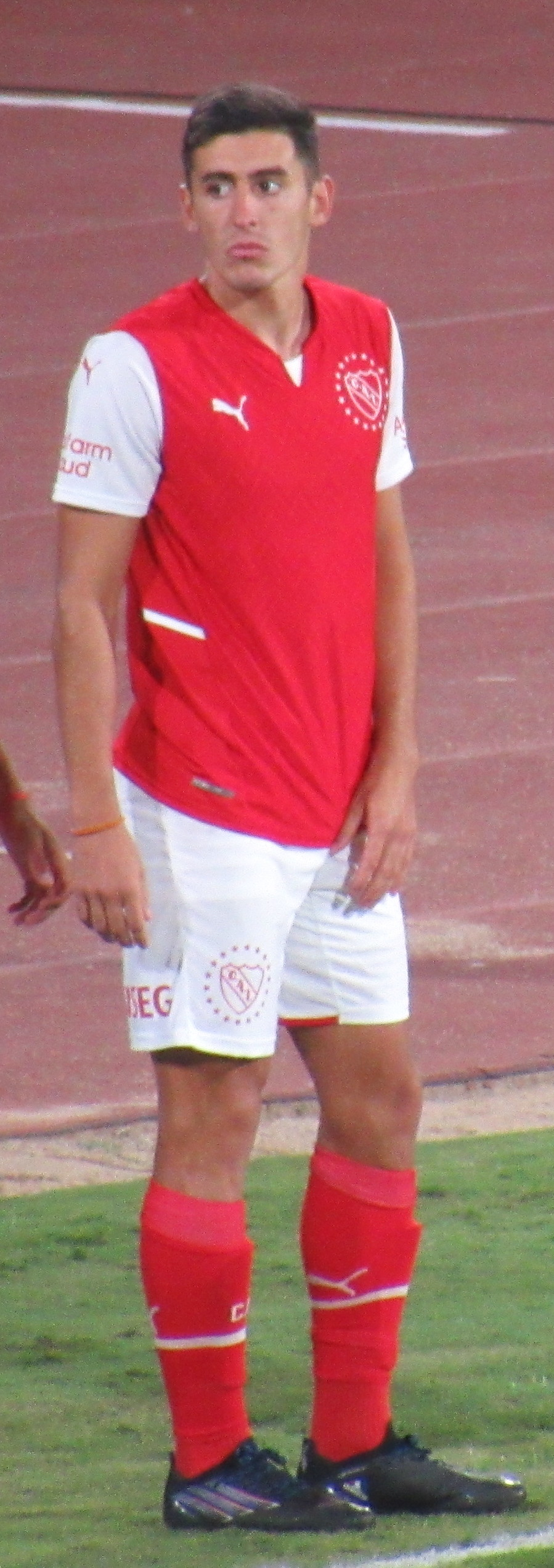
- Gastón Togni in 2022

Personal information
- Full name: Gastón Alberto Togni
- Date of birth: 20 September 1997 (age 29)
- Place of birth: Coronel Granada, Argentina
- Height: 1.80 m (5 ft 11 in)
- Position: Left winger

Team information
- Current team: Platense (on loan from Defensa y Justicia)
- Number: 16

Youth career
- Independiente

Senior career*
Years	Team	Apps	(Gls)
2017–2022	Independiente	47	(2)
2018–2019	→ Defensa y Justicia (loan)	18	(3)
2022–	Defensa y Justicia	78	(16)
2025	→ Pachuca (loan)	4	(2)
2026	→ Peñarol (loan)	18	(1)
2026–	→ Platense (loan)	7	(0)

International career
2017	Argentina U20	1	(0)
- * Club domestic league appearances and goals as of 17:11, 22 November 2026 (UTC)

Gastón Alberto Togni (born 20 September 1997) is an Argentine professional footballer who plays as a left winger for Platense, on loan from Defensa y Justicia.

== Career ==
=== Club ===
Togni's professional footballing career started with Argentine Primera División side Independiente in March 2017, he made his senior debut in a goalless draw at home to San Martín on 18 March. Seven more league appearances followed for Togni during 2016–17. Togni was loaned by Defensa y Justicia on 5 July 2018.

=== International ===
Togni was selected to train with the Argentina U20s ahead of the 2017 FIFA U-20 World Cup in South Korea, but he wasn't selected for the final squad. He did make his debut for the U20s in that period though, featuring in a friendly with Uruguay on 22 March 2017.

== Career statistics ==
As of 11 September 2018.

Club statistics
Club	Season	League			Cup (Note: Includes the Copa Argentina)		League Cup		Continental (Note: Includes the Copa Libertadores and Copa Sudamericana)		Other		Total	
Club	Season	Division	Apps	Goals	Apps	Goals	Apps	Goals	Apps	Goals	Apps	Goals	Apps	Goals
Independiente	2016–17	Primera División	8	0	0	0	—		0	0	0	0	8	0
Independiente	2017–18	Primera División	2	0	0	0	—		3 (Note: Three appearances in 2017 Copa Sudamericana)	0	0	0	5	0
Independiente	2018–19	Primera División	0	0	0	0	—		0	0	0	0	0	0
Independiente	Total		10	0	0	0	—		3	0	0	0	13	0
Defensa y Justicia (loan)	2018–19	Primera División	4	0	1	0	—		3 (Note: Three appearances in 2018 Copa Sudamericana)	0	0	0	8	0
Career total			14	0	1	0	—		6	0	0	0	21	0

== Honours ==
Independiente

- Copa Sudamericana: 2017

Argentina U23

- Pre-Olympic Tournament: 2020
