= Ariel Holan =

Argentine football manager (born 1960)

Personal information
- Full name: Ariel Enrique Holan
- Date of birth: 14 September 1960 (age 66)
- Place of birth: Lomas de Zamora, Argentina
- Height: 1.78 m (5 ft 10 in)

Youth career
- Years: Team
- Banfield

Managerial career
- 2003–2004: Arsenal de Sarandí (assistant)
- 2005: Estudiantes (assistant)
- 2006: Independiente (assistant)
- 2008: Banfield (assistant)
- 2009–2010: Arsenal de Sarandí (assistant)
- 2011: Argentinos Juniors (youth)
- 2011–2012: River Plate (assistant)
- 2013–2015: Banfield (assistant)
- 2015–2016: Defensa y Justicia
- 2017–2019: Independiente
- 2020–2021: Universidad Católica
- 2021: Santos
- 2021–2022: León
- 2022–2023: Universidad Católica
- 2024: Barcelona SC
- 2024–2025: Rosario Central
- 2026: Cerro Porteño
Medal record
Women's field hockey
Representing Uruguay
Pan American Games
Bronze medal – third place	2003 Santo Domingo	Team Competition

Ariel Enrique Holan (Spanish pronunciation: [ˈariel ˈxolan]; born 14 September 1960) is an Argentine professional football manager.

== Field hockey career ==
Holan was born in Lomas de Zamora, in the Buenos Aires Province. Despite stating that his childhood passion was football, he started his career playing field hockey for Lomas Athletic Club. He quit his playing career in 1979, while at San Martín, following the death of his father.

In 1976, aged only 16, Holan took over Lomas' women's B-team, remaining in charge for three years before moving to Club Alemán. After eight years, he was appointed coach of Olivos' women team, being in charge for three seasons.

In 1990, Holan was Gustavo Paolucci's assistant at the Argentina women's national team for the year's World Cup. After the end of the tournament, he returned to Lomas, now as coach of the women's main squad.

Holan subsequently worked with Banfield, San Fernando and Gimnasia y Esgrima de Buenos Aires before taking over Uruguay women's national team in 2003. At the 2003 Pan American Games held in Santo Domingo, his side won the Bronze medal after losing the semifinals to champions Argentina.

== Football career ==
=== Early career ===
In 2003, after attending soccer clinics in Pennsylvania and Atlantic City, Holan was appointed Jorge Burruchaga's assistant at Arsenal de Sarandí. He continued to work with Burrruchaga in the following years, at Estudiantes, Independiente, Banfield and back at Arsenal.

In 2011, Holan took over Argentinos Juniors' youth categories. On 26 June 2011, he was named Matías Almeyda's assistant at River Plate, and was a part of the club's staff during the promotion back to the top tier. He also worked as Almeyda's assistant at Banfield.

=== Defensa y Justicia ===
On 11 June 2015, Holan was named Defensa y Justicia manager, replacing José Oscar Flores. Earning plaudits for the team's performances, he led the club to a Copa Sudamericana qualification (the club's first ever international tournament), but resigned on 14 November 2016.

=== Independiente ===
On 29 December 2016, Holan was appointed manager of Independiente, in the place of fired Gabriel Milito. Roughly one year later, he lifted the 2017 Copa Sudamericana after defeating Flamengo at the Maracanã Stadium.

On 20 December 2017, Holan announced that he would not renew his contract with Independiente, which was due to expire in the end of the year. Three days later, however, he signed a new contract until the end of 2018.

On 27 June 2018, Holan extended his contract with Independiente until 2021. On 10 July of the following year, he left the club on a mutual agreement.

=== Universidad Católica ===
On 16 December 2019, Holan signed a two-year contract with Chilean Primera División side Universidad Católica. He led the side to their Campeonato Nacional accolade in 2020, the club's third consecutive league title, but left the club on 18 February 2021 due to a clause on his contract that allowed him to leave the club at the end of the season.

=== Santos ===
On 22 February 2021, Holan was announced as the new head coach of Brazilian club Santos on a three-year contract. On 26 April 2021, it was announced that he resigned from his post, after an incident with supporters and fireworks in front of his residence. He was the Santos manager for only 12 games (four wins, three ties and five losses).

=== León ===
On 11 May 2021, Holan was announced as the new head coach of Mexican Club León. On 21 April 2022, it was announced that he would no longer manage the club. During his time in the club he was able to win the Leagues Cup final against Seattle Sounders FC. He also reached the Liga MX Apertura 2021 Final, where the team were runner-ups to the championship.

=== Return to Universidad Católica ===
On 30 April 2022, Holan resigned from his position to rejoin Universidad Católica, signing a contract until Dec 31st 2023. He was sacked on 17 July 2023, after a poor run of form in the league.

== Managerial statistics ==
As of match played 23 August 2026

Managerial record by team and tenure
Team	Nat	From	To	Record								Ref
Team	Nat	From	To	G	W	D	L	GF	GA	GD	Win %	Ref
Defensa y Justicia	(Argentina)	11 June 2015	14 November 2016	47	17	13	17	51	42	+9	36.17	
Independiente	(Argentina)	29 December 2016	30 June 2019	104	49	32	23	152	89	+63	47.12	
Universidad Católica	(Chile)	16 December 2019	18 February 2021	47	23	14	10	79	52	+27	48.94	
Santos	(Brazil)	22 February 2021	26 April 2021	12	4	3	5	12	19	−7	33.33	
León	(Mexico)	11 May 2021	21 April 2022	43	18	10	15	46	45	+1	41.86	
Universidad Católica	(Chile)	9 May 2022	21 July 2023	47	20	12	15	77	58	+19	42.55	
Barcelona SC	(Ecuador)	22 April 2024	10 October 2024	22	10	4	8	28	27	+1	45.45	
Rosario Central	(Argentina)	11 November 2024	11 December 2025	42	22	14	6	47	26	+21	52.38	
Cerro Porteño	(Paraguay)	1 April 2026	27 August 2026	22	8	5	9	22	20	+2	36.36	
Total				387	171	107	109	514	381	+133	44.19	

== Honours ==
=== Manager ===
Independiente

- Copa Sudamericana: 2017
- Suruga Bank Championship: 2018

Universidad Católica

- Chilean Primera División: 2020

León

- Leagues Cup: 2021

Rosario Central

- Primera División: 2025 Liga
