= Héctor Urrego (footballer) =

Colombian footballer (born 1992)

Personal information
- Full name: Héctor Antonio Urrego Hurtado
- Date of birth: 10 November 1992 (age 33)
- Place of birth: Apartadó, Colombia
- Height: 1.87 m (6 ft 2 in)
- Position: Centre-back

Team information
- Current team: Laguna

Senior career*
Years	Team	Apps	(Gls)
2008–2009	Juventud Soacha	33	(0)
2010-2012	Juventud Girardot	21	(0)
2012–2020	Santa Fe	96	(8)
2019	→ Independiente Medellín (loan)	18	(1)
2020	→ Curicó Unido (loan)	3	(0)
2020	→ Sol de América (loan)	3	(0)
2021-2022	Jaguares	23	(3)
2022	EC Vitória	0	(0)
2022	Deportes Tolima	4	(0)
2024	Capital	11	(0)
2025	CS Esportiva	5	(0)
2025	Unión Magdalena	15	(1)
2026	Brazlândia	0	(0)
2026–	Laguna	3	(0)
- * Club domestic league appearances and goals as of 15:23, 19 June 2026 (UTC)

Héctor Antonio Urrego Hurtado (born 10 November 1992) is a Colombian professional footballer who plays as centre-back for Laguna.

== Career ==
Urrego plays for Santa Fé since his youth. He made his professional debut on 14 June 2012. He won two Liga Colombiana Finalizacion, a Liga Colombiana Apertura and a Copa Sudamericana with the team.

== Honours ==
Santa Fe

- Categoría Primera A: 2014 Finalización
- Copa Sudamericana: 2015
- Superliga Colombiana: 2015
- Suruga Bank Championship: 2016
