= Francisco Silva (footballer, born 1986) =

Chilean footballer

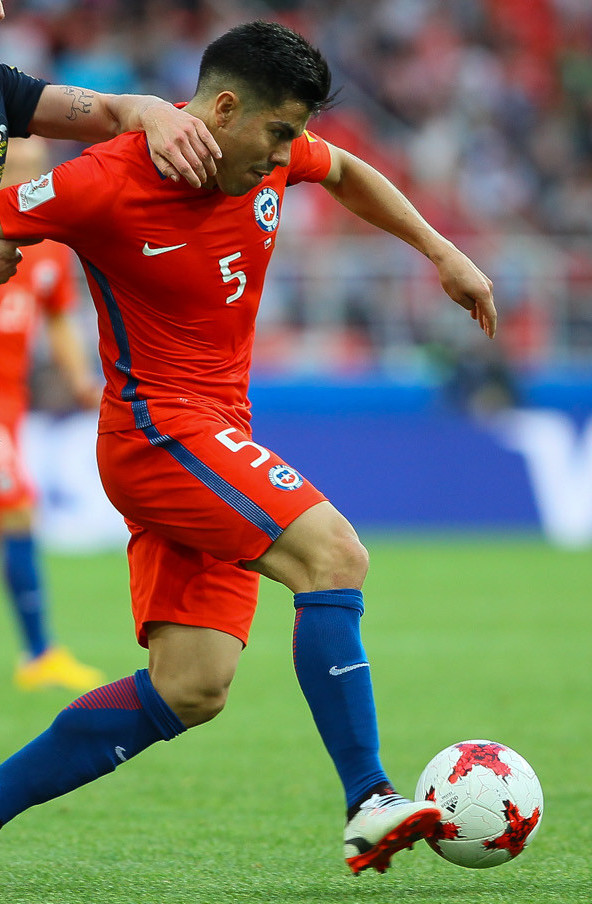
- Silva playing for Chile in 2017

Personal information
- Full name: Francisco Andrés Silva Gajardo
- Date of birth: 11 February 1986 (age 40)
- Place of birth: Quillota, Chile
- Height: 1.78 m (5 ft 10 in)
- Position: Defensive midfielder

Youth career
- 1998–1999: Colo-Colo
- 2000–2005: Universidad Católica

Senior career*
Years	Team	Apps	(Gls)
2005–2013	Universidad Católica	136	(5)
2005	→ Deportes Ovalle (loan)		
2007	→ Provincial Osorno (loan)	33	(1)
2013–2015	Osasuna	47	(1)
2014–2015	→ Club Brugge (loan)	11	(0)
2015–2016	Chiapas	28	(0)
2016–2018	Cruz Azul	54	(7)
2018–2019	Independiente	10	(0)
2019–2021	Universidad Católica	17	(0)
2024	Deportes Limache	20	(0)
2025	Montijo	15	(0)

International career
2007–2018	Chile	37	(0)
Medal record
Representing Chile
Winner	Copa América	2015
Winner	Copa América Centenario	2016
Runner-up	FIFA Confederations Cup	2017
- * Club domestic league appearances and goals as of 31 December 2025

Francisco Andrés 'Gato' Silva Gajardo (born 11 February 1986), known as Francisco Silva, is a Chilean professional footballer who plays as a defensive midfielder. He is considered one of the greatest Chilean defensive midfielders of all time. His winning penalty in Copa America Centenario gave Chile their second consecutive Copa America title.

== Club career ==
Born in Quillota, Silva joined Universidad Católica's youth setup in 2000, aged 14. In 2005, he made his senior debuts, while on loan at lowly Deportes Ovalle, and appeared twice for the first-team in the following year. In 2007, he joined Osorno, also on loan, where he was ever-present in the promotion campaign.

After his return, Silva established himself as a regular for the UC, and scored his first goal on 7 November 2009, in a 4–1 home routing over Universidad Concepción.

=== Lecce ===
In the 2010 summer Silva was linked to Lecce, but due to reductions in the non-EU registration quota (two for one during the summer) the deal collapsed, as the club already signed Rubén Olivera.

=== Osasuna ===
On 22 January 2013, Silva was loaned to La Liga strugglers CA Osasuna until June. He made his debut abroad on 2 February, coming on as a second-half substitute in a 1–0 home win over Celta de Vigo. On 8 March Silva netted his first goal for Osasuna, but in a 1–2 loss at Real Betis; on 4 June the Navarrese side exercised the buyout clause, paying €1.2 million for his services. He featured regularly for the club during the 2013–14 campaign, which ended in relegation.

=== Club Brugge ===
On 29 August 2014, Silva was loaned to Club Brugge KV, in a season-long deal with a buyout clause. On 13 July of the following year he was transferred to Chiapas.

=== Retirement and return to play ===
In September 2021, Silva announced his retirement while he was a player of Universidad Católica after suffering a tibia-fibula fracture. In 2024, he returned to play by signing with Deportes Limache for the 2024 season in the Primera B de Chile. The next year, he moved to Spain and joined UD Montijo.

== International career ==
Silva made his main squad debut on 22 January 2011, starting in a 1–1 draw against United States at Home Depot Center.

Silva was not initially named in Chile's 2015 Copa America squad but was added to the team due to an injury to Edson Puch.

Silva scored the winning goal in the 4–2 penalty shoot-out win against Argentina in the Copa América Centenario Final on 26 June 2016.

== Career statistics ==
As of match played on 15 April 2018

Appearances and goals by club, season and competition
Club	Season	League			National cup		League cup		Other		Total	
Club	Season	Division	Apps	Goals	Apps	Goals	Apps	Goals	Apps	Goals	Apps	Goals
Universidad Católica	2008	Primera División of Chile	?	1	0	0	—		—		?	1
Universidad Católica	2009	Primera División of Chile	36	1	0	0	—		—		36	1
Universidad Católica	2010	Primera División of Chile	29	2	0	0	—		7	2	36	4
Universidad Católica	2011	Primera División of Chile	35	2	4	1	—		13	0	52	3
Universidad Católica	2012	Primera División of Chile	26	0	4	1	—		13	1	43	2
Universidad Católica	Total		126	6	8	2	0	0	33	3	167	11
Osasuna (loan)	2012–13	La Liga	16	1	0	0	—		—		16	1
Osasuna	2013–14	La Liga	31	0	3	0	—		—		34	0
Osasuna	2014–15	Segunda División	1	0	0	0	—		—		1	0
Osasuna	Total		32	0	3	0	0	0	0	0	35	0
Club Brugge (loan)	2014–15	Belgian Pro League	11	0	3	0	—		7	0	21	0
Chiapas	2015–16	Liga MX	28	0	0	0	—		—		28	0
Cruz Azul	2016–17	Liga MX	25	6	7	1	—		—		32	7
Cruz Azul	2017–18	Liga MX	29	1	5	1	—		—		34	2
Cruz Azul	Total		54	7	12	2	0	0	0	0	66	9
Career total			267	14	26	4	0	0	40	3	333	21

== Honours ==
Provincial Osorno

- Primera B de Chile: 2007

Universidad Católica

- Chilean Primera División: 2010, 2019, 2020
- Copa Chile: 2011
- Supercopa de Chile: 2020

Club Brugge

- Belgian Cup: 2014–15

Independiente

- Suruga Bank Championship: 2018

Chile

- Copa América: 2015, 2016
- FIFA Confederations Cup runner-up: 2017
