= Milton Álvarez =

Argentine footballer (born 1989)

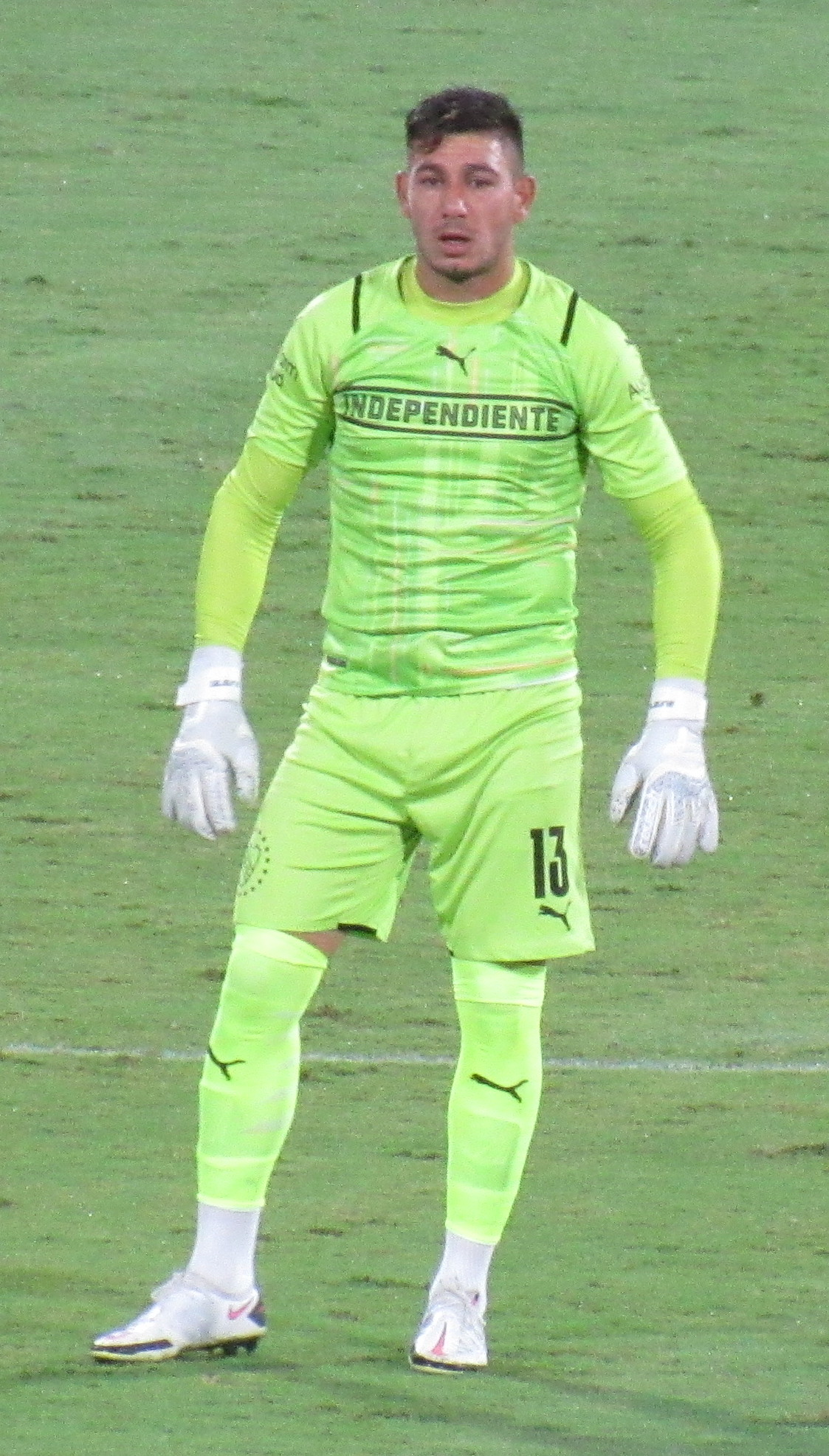
- Álvarez with Independiente in 2022

Personal information
- Full name: Milton David Álvarez
- Date of birth: 26 January 1989 (age 37)
- Place of birth: Munro, Argentina
- Height: 1.85 m (6 ft 1 in)
- Position: Goalkeeper

Team information
- Current team: Gimnasia Jujuy

Youth career
- Colegiales

Senior career*
Years	Team	Apps	(Gls)
2008–2010	Colegiales	0	(0)
2011–2013	Huracán Tres Arroyos	46	(0)
2013–2014	Sportivo Italiano	24	(0)
2015	Colegiales	33	(0)
2016–2018	Deportivo Morón	76	(0)
2018–2023	Independiente	25	(0)
2023–2024	Quilmes	36	(0)
2024–2025	Deportes Limache	20	(0)
2025–	Gimnasia Jujuy	46	(0)
- * Club domestic league appearances and goals as of 17:10, 28 April 2026 (UTC)

Milton David Álvarez (born 26 January 1989) is an Argentine professional footballer who plays as a goalkeeper for Gimnasia Jujuy.

== Career ==
Álvarez began his career in 2008 with Colegiales, being moved into the senior squad during the 2008–09 Primera B Metropolitana season. He departed in 2010 without making an appearance for Colegiales, subsequently signing for Huracán of Torneo Argentino A. He appeared fifteen times in 2011–12, a campaign which ended with relegation in Torneo Argentino B. Álvarez remained with Huracán for one further season, prior to leaving for Sportivo Italiano in 2013. After six months with the club, Álvarez was on the move again in January 2015 when he rejoined Colegiales. His first match back was a 1–1 draw with Deportivo Merlo on 6 April.

He was selected in thirty-three fixtures in the 2015 Primera B Metropolitana. Fellow third tier outfit Deportivo Morón signed Álvarez on 3 January 2016. His stay with the club lasted between 2016 and 2018, which included seventy-six appearances and a promotion to Primera B Nacional in 2016–17. In July 2018, Álvarez joined Independiente of the Argentine Primera División.

In 2024, he moved to Chile and joined Deportes Limache in the Primera B.

== Career statistics ==
As of 29 September 2018.

Club statistics
Club	Season	League			Cup (Note: Includes the Copa Argentina)		League Cup		Continental (Note: Includes the Copa Libertadores)		Other		Total	
Club	Season	Division	Apps	Goals	Apps	Goals	Apps	Goals	Apps	Goals	Apps	Goals	Apps	Goals
Colegiales	2008–09	Primera B Metropolitana	0	0	0	0	—		—		0	0	0	0
Colegiales	2009–10	Primera B Metropolitana	0	0	0	0	—		—		0	0	0	0
Colegiales	Total		0	0	0	0	—		—		0	0	0	0
Huracán	2011–12	Torneo Argentino A	15	0	0	0	—		—		0	0	15	0
Huracán	2012–13	Torneo Argentino B	31	0	0	0	—		—		0	0	31	0
Huracán	Total		46	0	0	0	—		—		0	0	46	0
Sportivo Italiano	2013–14	Primera C Metropolitana	16	0	4	0	—		—		0	0	20	0
Sportivo Italiano	2014	Primera B Metropolitana	8	0	0	0	—		—		0	0	8	0
Sportivo Italiano	Total		24	0	4	0	—		—		0	0	28	0
Colegiales	2015	Primera B Metropolitana	33	0	0	0	—		—		0	0	33	0
Deportivo Morón	2016	Primera B Metropolitana	19	0	0	0	—		—		0	0	19	0
Deportivo Morón	2016–17	Primera B Metropolitana	34	0	0	0	—		—		0	0	34	0
Deportivo Morón	2017–18	Primera B Nacional	23	0	0	0	—		—		0	0	23	0
Deportivo Morón	Total		76	0	0	0	—		—		0	0	76	0
Independiente	2018–19	Primera División	1	0	0	0	—		0	0	0	0	1	0
Career total			147	0	4	0	—		0	0	0	0	151	0

== Honours ==
Sportivo Italiano

- Primera C Metropolitana: 2013–14

Deportivo Morón

- Primera B Metropolitana: 2016–17

Independiente

- Suruga Bank Championship: 2018
