= 2016 Suruga Bank Championship =

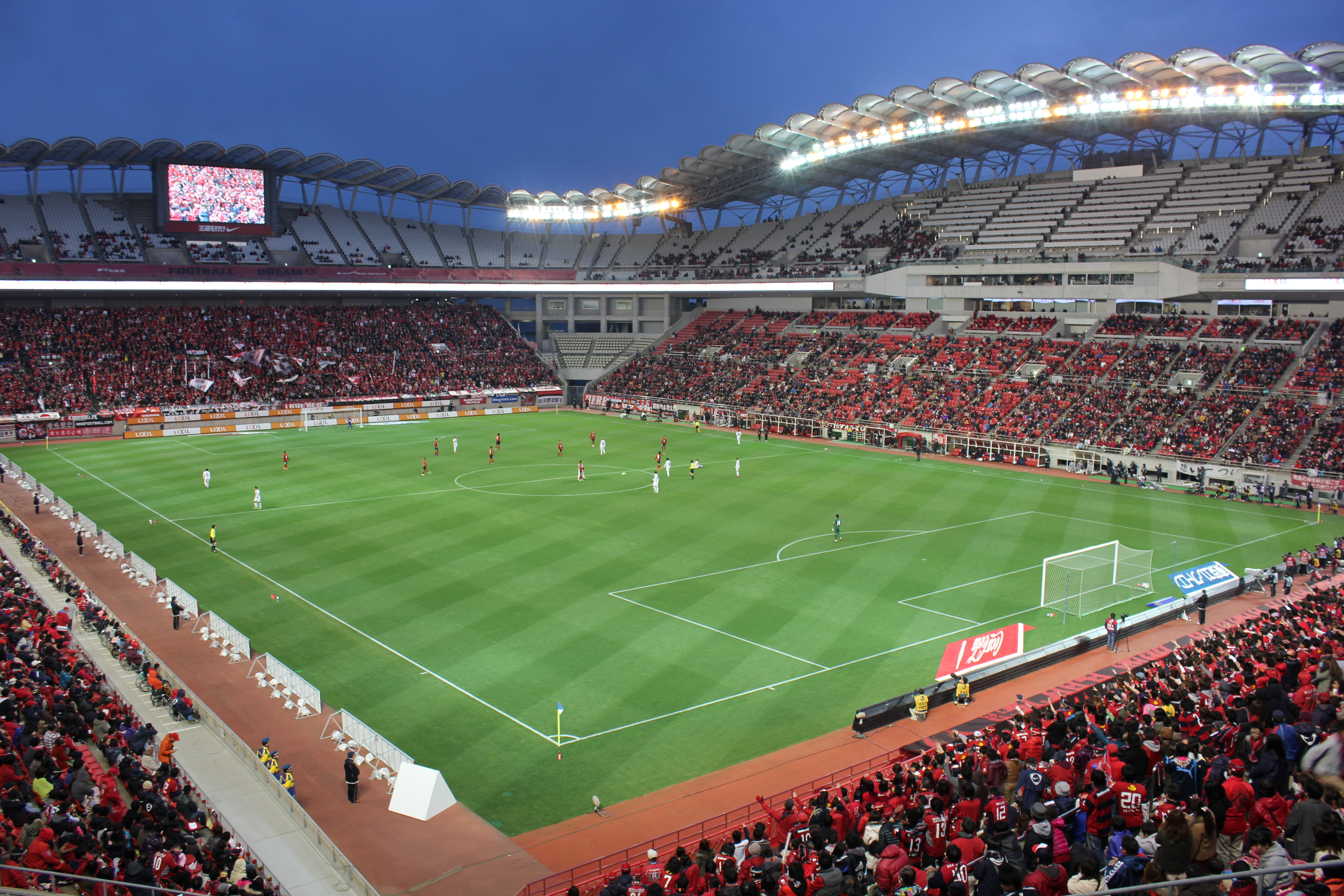
- Kashima Soccer Stadium in Kashima, Japan hosted the match
Kashima Antlers	Santa Fe
(Japan)	(Colombia)
0	1
- Date: 10 August 2016
- Venue: Kashima Soccer Stadium, Kashima
- Referee: Ma Ning (China)
- Attendance: 19,716

The 2016 Suruga Bank Championship (Japanese: スルガ銀行チャンピオンシップ2016; Spanish: Copa Suruga Bank 2016) was the ninth edition of the Suruga Bank Championship, the club football match co-organized by the Japan Football Association, the football governing body of Japan, CONMEBOL, the football governing body of South America, and J.League, the professional football league of Japan, between the winners of the previous season's J.League Cup and Copa Sudamericana.

The match was contested between Japanese team Kashima Antlers, the 2015 J.League Cup winners, and Colombian team Santa Fe, the 2015 Copa Sudamericana winners. It was hosted by Kashima Antlers at the Kashima Soccer Stadium in Kashima on 10 August 2016.

Santa Fe defeated Kashima Antlers 1–0 to win their first Suruga Bank Championship title, and their second international title following their 2015 Copa Sudamericana triumph.

== Teams ==
Team	Association / Confederation	Qualification	Previous appearances (bold indicates winners)
(Japan) Kashima Antlers	Japan Football Association	2015 J.League Cup winners	2 (**2012**, **2013**)
(Colombia) Santa Fe	CONMEBOL	2015 Copa Sudamericana winners	None

== Format ==
The Suruga Bank Championship was played as a single match, with the J.League Cup winners hosting the match. If tied at the end of regulation, extra time would not be played, and the penalty shoot-out would be used to determine the winner. A maximum of seven substitutions may be made during the match.

== Match ==
10 August 2016
19:00 UTC+9

Kashima Antlers (Japan)	0–1	(Colombia) Santa Fe
	Report (JFA); Report (J. League); Report (CONMEBOL)	Osorio 79'

Kashima Soccer Stadium, Kashima
Attendance: 19,716
Referee: Ma Ning (China)

**Kashima Antlers**	**Santa Fe**

GK	21	(Japan) Hitoshi Sogahata
DF	22	(Japan) Daigo Nishi
DF	16	(Japan) Shuto Yamamoto
DF	3	(Japan) Gen Shoji
DF	14	(South Korea) Hwang Seok-ho	(yellow card) 86'
MF	40	(Japan) Mitsuo Ogasawara (c)
MF	33	(Japan) Mu Kanazaki
MF	13	(Japan) Atsutaka Nakamura		(substituted off) 86'
MF	10	(Japan) Gaku Shibasaki		(substituted off) 79'
FW	18	(Japan) Shuhei Akasaki		(substituted off) 70'
FW	34	(Japan) Yuma Suzuki		(substituted off) 70'
Substitutes:
GK	29	(Japan) Shinichiro Kawamata
DF	24	(Japan) Yukitoshi Ito
DF	28	(Japan) Koki Machida
MF	6	(Japan) Ryota Nagaki		(substituted on) 79'
MF	8	(Japan) Shoma Doi		(substituted on) 70'
MF	11	(Brazil) Fabrício		(substituted on) 70'
MF	32	(Japan) Taro Sugimoto		(substituted on) 86'
Manager:
(Japan) Masatada Ishii

GK	1	(Colombia) Róbinson Zapata
DF	26	(Colombia) Javier López	(yellow card) 74'
DF	27	(Colombia) Carlos Mario Arboleda
DF	29	(Colombia) Dairon Mosquera
DF	2	(Uruguay) Horacio Salaberry
MF	17	(Colombia) Juan Daniel Roa	(yellow card) 9'
MF	10	(Argentina) Omar Pérez (c)		(substituted off) 77'
MF	11	(Argentina) Jonathan Gómez		(substituted off) 88'
MF	30	(Colombia) Yeison Gordillo	(yellow card) 62' (yellow-red card) 90+1'
FW	9	(Venezuela) Juan Manuel Falcón		(substituted off) 63'
FW	24	(Colombia) Humberto Osorio		(substituted off) 90+2'
Substitutes:
GK	22	(Colombia) Leandro Castellanos
DF	5	(Colombia) Yulián Anchico		(substituted on) 90+2'
DF	7	(Colombia) Leyvin Balanta		(substituted on) 88'
DF	15	(Colombia) Héctor Urrego
MF	14	(Colombia) Baldomero Perlaza	(yellow card) 84'	(substituted on) 63'
MF	20	(Colombia) Kevin Salazar
FW	16	(Colombia) Anderson Plata		(substituted on) 77'
Manager:
(Argentina) Gustavo Costas

Assistant referees:
Huo Weiming (China)
Shi Xiang (China)
Fourth official:
Ai Kun (China)
