= Ezequiel Cerutti =

Argentine forward

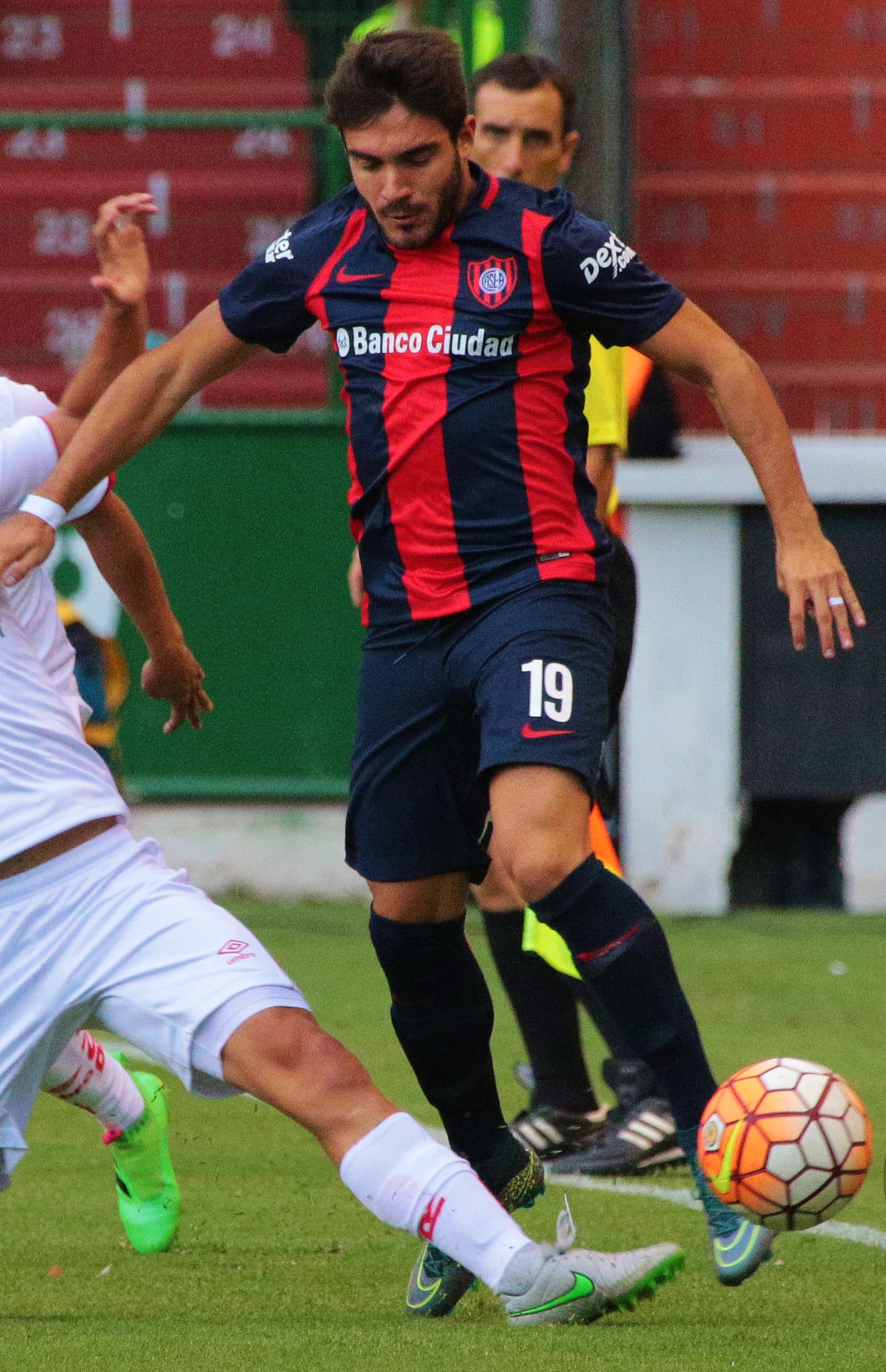
- Cerutti in 2016

Personal information
- Full name: Ezequiel Osvaldo Cerutti
- Date of birth: 17 January 1992 (age 34)
- Place of birth: Junín, Buenos Aires, Argentina
- Height: 1.79 m (5 ft 10 in)
- Positions: Winger; forward

Team information
- Current team: San Lorenzo
- Number: 7

Youth career
- Sarmiento

Senior career*
Years	Team	Apps	(Gls)
2009–2013	Sarmiento	105	(7)
2013–2014	Olimpo	37	(3)
2014–2015	Estudiantes LP	62	(6)
2016–2018	San Lorenzo	73	(6)
2018–2019	Al Hilal	12	(1)
2018–2019	→ Independiente (loan)	17	(0)
2019–	San Lorenzo	124	(4)
2020–2021	→ Coritiba (loan)	13	(2)
- * Club domestic league appearances and goals as of 16:47, 4 June 2026 (UTC)

Ezequiel Osvaldo Cerutti (born 17 January 1992) is an Argentine forward who plays as a winger for San Lorenzo.

== Honours ==
=== Club ===
Club Atlético Sarmiento

- Primera B Metropolitana: 2011–12

San Lorenzo

- Supercopa Argentina: 2015

Al Hilal

- Saudi Professional League: 2017–18

Independiente

- Suruga Bank Championship: 2018
