= Silvio Romero (footballer) =

Argentine footballer

Personal information
- Full name: Silvio Ezequiel Romero
- Date of birth: 22 July 1988 (age 38)
- Place of birth: Córdoba, Argentina
- Height: 1.77 m (5 ft 10 in)
- Position: Striker

Senior career*
Years	Team	Apps	(Gls)
2005–2010	Instituto	68	(22)
2010–2015	Lanús	137	(41)
2013–2014	→ Rennes (loan)	14	(3)
2015–2016	Chiapas	47	(19)
2016–2018	América	53	(15)
2018–2024	Independiente	77	(37)
2022–2023	→ Fortaleza (loan)	99	(23)
2024–2025	Instituto	37	(1)
- * Club domestic league appearances and goals as of 18:20, 16 March 2026 (UTC)

Silvio Ezequiel Romero (born 22 July 1988) is an Argentine professional footballer who plays as a striker.

== Career ==
=== Early career ===
Romero began his career with Instituto de Córdoba at the age of 17, playing with the club until transferring to Lanús in 2010. Romero joined French Ligue 1 side Stade Rennes on loan during the 2013–14 season. After the loan spell, Mexican club Monarcas Morelia succeeded in obtaining him in the summer of 2014; however he failed to pass a medical ahead of the official signing due to a mild virus he had contracted while in France.

In 2015, Romero signed with Mexican club Chiapas. In his first tournament with the club – the 2015 Clausura – he played in 11 matches and only managed to score one goal. In his first full season with the club, Romero's performance had improved, scoring 18 goals (10 in the 2015 Apertura and 8 in the 2016 Clausura), as well as 8 assists.

=== América ===
On 8 June 2016, it was announced that Romero was sold to Club América for a rumored $8 million. He scored 10 league goals as América finished runners-up in the league, as well as scoring two goals at the 2016 FIFA Club World Cup.

== Honours ==
Lanús

- Copa Sudamericana: 2013

Indepediente

- Copa Suruga Bank: 2018

Fortaleza

- Copa do Nordeste: 2022
- Campeonato Cearense: 2022, 2023

Individual

- Copa Sudamericana top scorer: 2019 (5 goals)
