= Domingo Blanco =

Argentine footballer (born 1995)

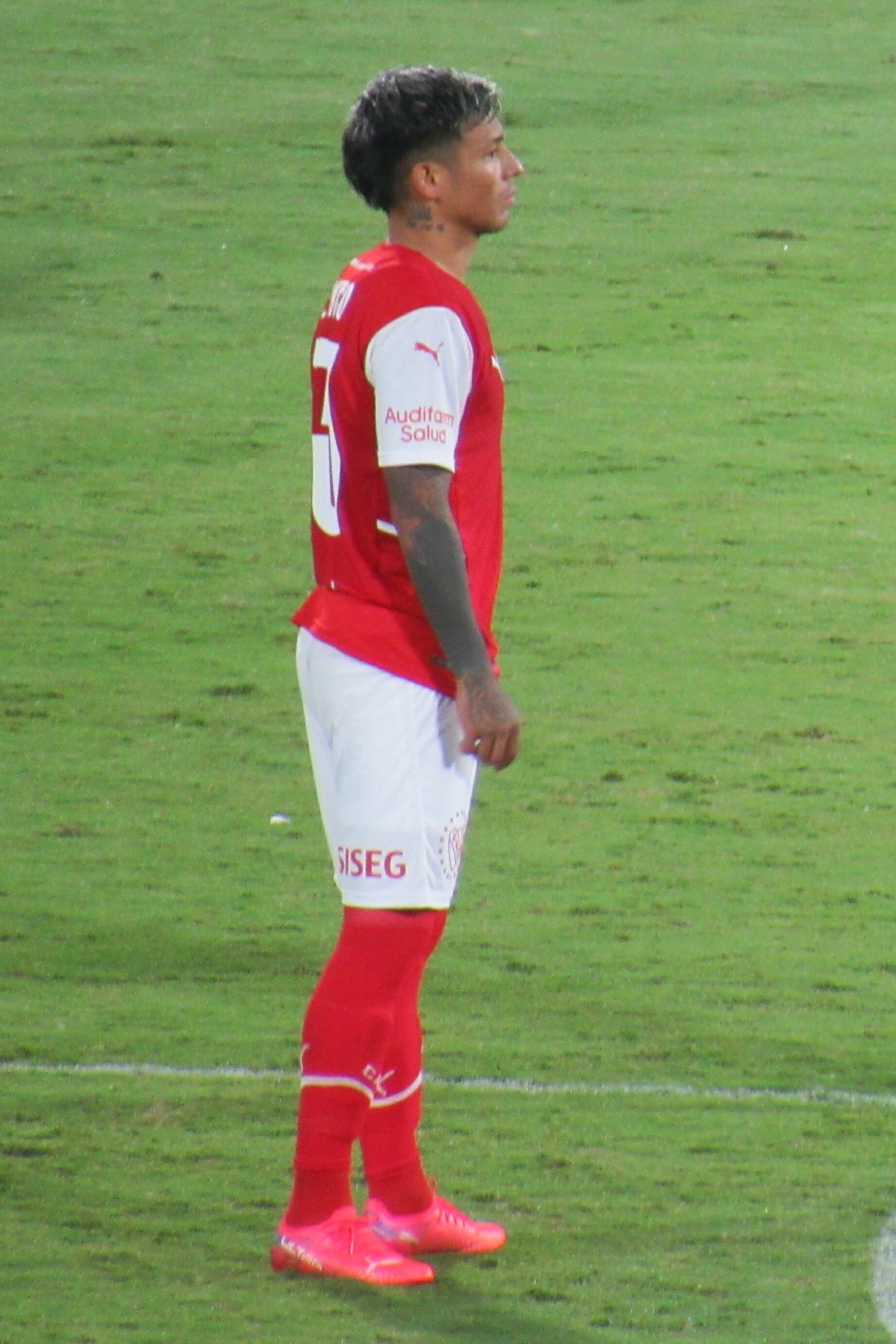

Personal information
- Full name: Domingo Felipe Blanco
- Date of birth: 22 April 1995 (age 31)
- Place of birth: Punta Alta, Argentina
- Height: 1.67 m (5 ft 6 in)
- Position: Central midfielder

Team information
- Current team: Defensa y Justicia (on loan from Tijuana)
- Number: 27

Youth career
- –2015: Olimpo

Senior career*
Years	Team	Apps	(Gls)
2015–2022	Independiente	84	(2)
2018–2019	→ Defensa y Justicia (loan)	24	(0)
2022–2024	Dnipro-1	14	(1)
2023–2024	→ Tijuana (loan)	25	(2)
2024–	Tijuana	55	(4)
2026–	→ Defensa y Justicia (loan)	1	(0)

International career^{‡}
2019	Argentina	1	(0)
- * Club domestic league appearances and goals as of 17:37, 25 July 2026 (UTC) ‡ National team caps and goals as of 21:51, 22 March 2019 (UTC)

Domingo Felipe Blanco (born 22 April 1995) is an Argentine professional footballer who plays as a central midfielder for Defensa y Justicia, on loan from Liga MX club Tijuana.

== Club career ==
Blanco started his senior career with Argentine Primera División side Olimpo in 2014, he was an unused substitute for a Copa Argentina match with Atlético de Rafaela on 22 July. On 9 February 2015, Blanco joined fellow Primera División team Independiente on loan. He made his professional debut on 17 April 2016 during an away win against Vélez Sarsfield. After two further appearances in 2016 and 2016–17, Independiente signed Blanco permanently in March 2017. Just over a year later, Blanco completed a loan move to Defensa y Justicia on 5 July 2018.

== International career ==
On 7 March 2019, Blanco received a call-up from Argentina's Lionel Scaloni for friendlies with Venezuela and Morocco. He won his first cap on 22 March at the Wanda Metropolitano as they lost to Venezuela.

== Career statistics ==
=== Club ===
As of 22 March 2019.

Club statistics
Club	Season	League			Cup		Continental		Other		Total	
Club	Season	Division	Apps	Goals	Apps	Goals	Apps	Goals	Apps	Goals	Apps	Goals
Independiente	2016	Primera División	2	0	0	0	—		0	0	2	0
Independiente	2016–17	Primera División	4	0	1	0	1 (Note: Appearance(s) in the Copa Sudamericana)	0	0	0	6	0
Independiente	2017–18	Primera División	5	0	0	0	1	0	0	0	6	0
Independiente	2018–19	Primera División	0	0	0	0	0	0	0	0	0	0
Independiente	Total		12	0	1	0	2	0	0	0	15	0
Defensa y Justicia (loan)	2018–19	Primera División	22	0	0	0	6	0	0	0	28	0
Career total			34	0	1	0	8	0	0	0	43	0

=== International ===
As of 22 March 2019.

National team	Year	Apps	Goals
Argentina	2019	1	0
Total		1	0

== Honours ==
Independiente

- Copa Sudamericana: 2017
