= Pablo Hernández (footballer, born 1986) =

Argentine-born Chilean footballer

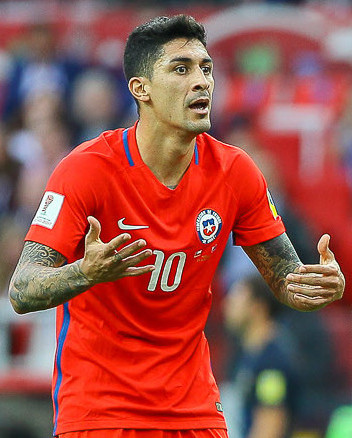
- Hernández with Chile at the 2017 FIFA Confederations Cup

Personal information
- Full name: Pedro Pablo Hernández
- Date of birth: 24 October 1986 (age 40)
- Place of birth: Tucumán, Argentina
- Height: 1.85 m (6 ft 1 in)
- Position: Midfielder

Youth career
- UTA
- –2005: Racing Club
- 2005–2006: Atlético Tucumán

Senior career*
Years	Team	Apps	(Gls)
2006–2008	Atlético Tucumán	35	(12)
2008–2009	Racing Montevideo	15	(2)
2009–2011	Defensor Sporting	14	(3)
2010	→ DC United (loan)	14	(0)
2011–2013	Argentinos Juniors	64	(4)
2013–2014	O'Higgins	29	(11)
2014–2018	Celta Vigo	118	(7)
2018–2021	Independiente	40	(3)
2021–2023	O'Higgins	57	(7)
2024	San Martín Tucumán	23	(1)
Total		409	(50)

International career
2014–2019	Chile	30	(3)
Medal record
Representing Chile
Winner	Copa América Centenario	2016
Runner-up	FIFA Confederations Cup	2017
- * Club domestic league appearances and goals

Pedro Pablo Hernández (born 24 October 1986) is a former professional footballer who played as a midfielder. Born in Argentina, he represented the Chile national team.

== Club career ==
=== Argentina and Uruguay ===
Born in Tucumán, Hernández moved to Buenos Aires at early age, and subsequently joined Racing Club's youth setup. He was released in 2005, aged 19, and returned to his hometown. After failing in a trial at San Martín de Tucumán, Hernández moved to Atlético Tucumán. He made his senior debuts in 2006, and moved abroad two years later, joining Racing Montevideo.

On 7 August 2009 Hernández moved to Defensor Sporting. He made his debut on the 23rd, starting in a 5–1 home routing over Atenas de San Carlos, and scored his first goal roughly a month later, netting the last of a 4–0 win at Central Español.

=== Major League Soccer ===
On 1 July 2010, D.C. United officially announced the loan signing of Hernández from Uruguayan club Defensor Sporting, after he trialed with the club. Despite being a regular starter for DC United, he rescinded his link on 7 January of the following year, and moved to Argentinos Juniors late in the month.

=== O'Higgins ===
In July 2013 Hernández joined O'Higgins, as a replacement for Universidad de Chile-bound Juan Rodrigo Rojas. He was a part of the side which won the campaign's Apertura tournament, scoring seven goals in 18 matches, including the historical goal in the final against Universidad Católica.

Hernández appeared with the side in 2014 Copa Libertadores, appearing in all matches as his side were knocked out in the group stages.

=== Celta de Vigo ===
On 26 June 2014, Hernández moved teams and countries again, after agreeing to a four-year deal with La Liga side Celta de Vigo, for an € 1.6 million fee. He made his debut for the club on 30 August, replacing Nolito in the 85th minute of a 1–1 away draw against Córdoba CF.

Hernández scored his first goal in the main category of Spanish football on 20 September, netting the first of a 2–2 away draw against Atlético Madrid.

=== Independiente ===
On 4 July 2018, Hernández returned to his natal Argentina and signed with Independiente.

=== Return to O'Higgins ===
In July 2021, Hernández returned to Chilean side O'Higgins after ending his contract with Independiente. After two and a half seasons with them, he retired from professional football at the end of the 2023 season.

=== San Martín de Tucumán ===
In 2024, Hernández returned to professional football by signing with San Martín de Tucumán in his city of birth. In June 2025, he confirmed his retirement and was appointed the sport manager of the same club.

== International career ==
=== Eligibility ===
Since Hernández has Chilean Citizenship through Jus sanguinis principles in December 2013, he is eligible to play for Chile. Hernández was born in Argentina and is an Argentine citizen; he thus had the choice of either playing for Chile or Argentina.

When asked about his choice in a 2013 interview, he stated:

I feel Chilean largely. During my first year I lived with my grandmother. I have a great affection despite the short time I've been in Rancagua. It was up the possibility for blood right and thank God, yesterday (Tuesday), I received my documents formalizing and dual nationality.

— Hernández speaking about his switch of allegiance.

=== Chile call-up ===
He then was called up by Jorge Sampaoli to represent his new country's main squad in a friendly against Costa Rica. He made his international debut on 22 January 2014, scoring the second and third in a 4–0 win at the Estadio Municipal Francisco Sánchez Rumoroso.

In June 2014, Hernández was called up to the provisional 30-men squad for the World Cup in Brazil, however an injury ruled him out of the final squad. He was re-called to play in the friendly match against Bolivia on 14 October 2014, where he was victim of a penalty that Arturo Vidal changed for goal and the final 2–2. In November, he was called to play against Venezuela and Uruguay, Hernandez scored the fifth goal in the 5–0 win against Venezuela in Talcahuano.

=== International goals ===
Scores and results list Chile's goal tally first.

#	Date	Venue	Opponent	Score	Result	Competition
1.	22 January 2014	Francisco Sánchez Rumoroso, Coquimbo, Chile	Costa Rica	2–0	4–0	Friendly match
2.	22 January 2014	Francisco Sánchez Rumoroso, Coquimbo, Chile	Costa Rica	3–0	4–0	Friendly match
3.	14 November 2014	Estadio CAP, Talcahuano, Chile	Venezuela	5–0	5–0	Friendly match

== Career statistics ==
=== Club ===
As of 24 November 2018

Appearances and goals by club, season and competition
Club	Season	League			National cup		Continental		Other		Total	
Club	Season	Division	Apps	Goals	Apps	Goals	Apps	Goals	Apps	Goals	Apps	Goals
Racing Montevideo	2008–09	Primera División	15	2	0	0	—		5 (Note: Appearances in Liguilla Pre-Libertadores)	3	20	5
Defensor	2009–10	Primera División	14	3	0	0	—		—		14	3
D.C. United	2010	MLS	14	0	2	1	—		—		16	1
Argentinos Juniors	2010–11	Primera División	6	0	0	0	3 (Note: Appearances in Copa Libertadores)	0	—		9	0
Argentinos Juniors	2011–12	Primera División	36	3	1	0	1 (Note: Appearances in Copa Sudamericana)	0	—		38	3
Argentinos Juniors	2012–13	Primera División	22	1	0	0	2	1	—		24	2
Argentinos Juniors	Total		64	4	1	0	6	1	0	0	71	5
O'Higgins	2013–14	Primera División	29	11	4	4	6	0	1 (Note: Appearances in Súper Final)	1	39	15
Celta de Vigo	2014–15	La Liga	29	1	3	0	0	0	–		32	1
Celta de Vigo	2015–16	La Liga	33	2	7	2	0	0	–		41	4
Celta de Vigo	2016–17	La Liga	26	1	7	0	12	0	–		45	1
Celta de Vigo	2017–18	La Liga	30	3	2	0	0	0	–		33	3
Celta de Vigo	Total		118	7	19	2	12	0	0	0	149	9
Independiente	2018–19	Primera División	7	1	1	0	4	0	1 (Note: Appearances in Suruga Bank Championship)	0	13	1
Career total			261	28	27	7	25	1	7	4	320	40

== Honours ==
=== Club ===
Atlético Tucumán

- Torneo Argentino A: 2007–08

O'Higgins

- Primera División: Apertura 2013–14
- Supercopa de Chile: 2014

Independiente

- Suruga Bank Championship: 2018

=== International ===
Chile

- Copa América Centenario: 2016
- FIFA Confederations Cup: Runner-up 2017

=== Individual ===
O'Higgins

- Medalla Santa Cruz de Triana: 2014

Celta Vigo

- UEFA Europa League Squad of the Season: 2016–17
