= 2018 Suruga Bank Championship =

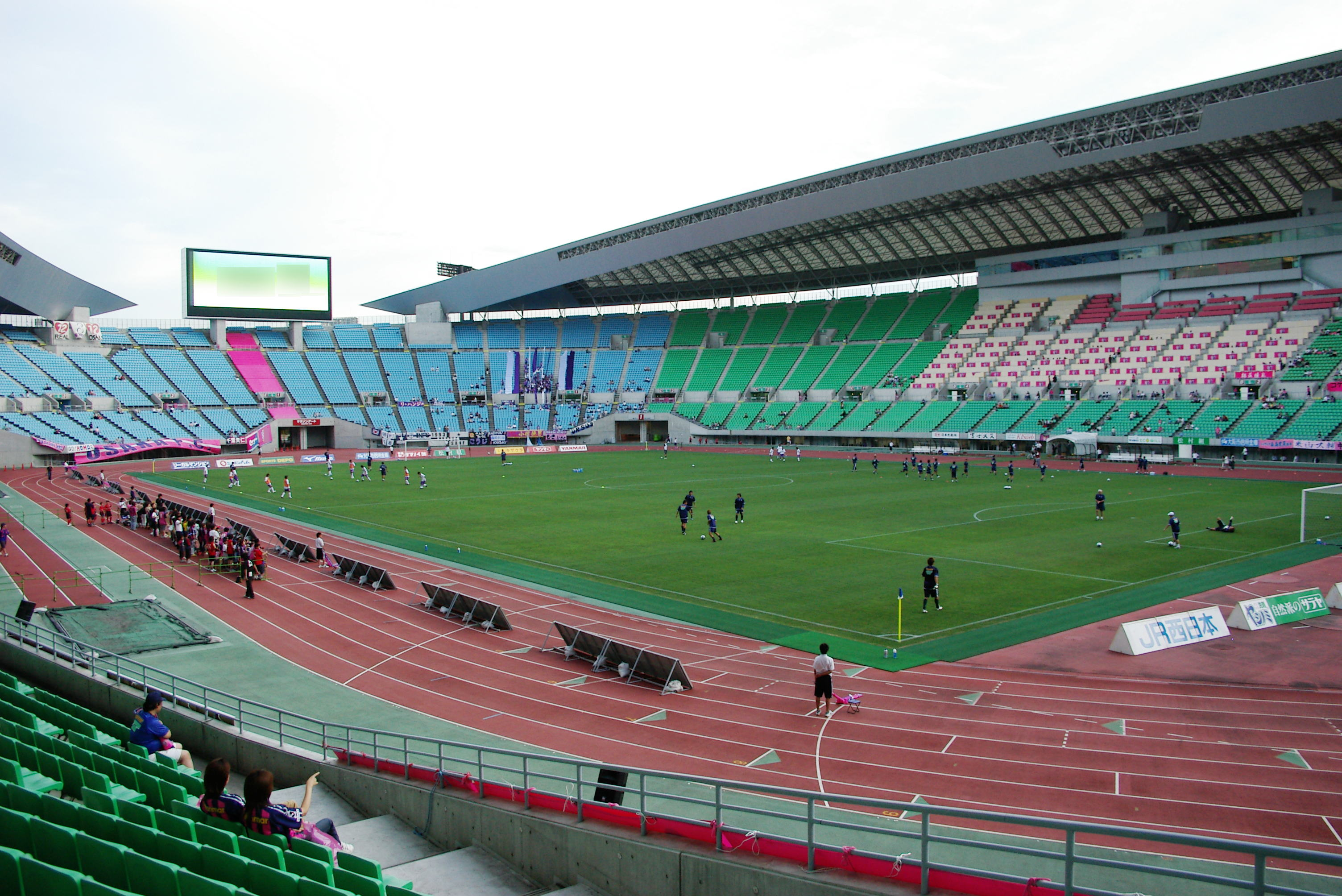
- The Yanmar Stadium Nagai in Osaka hosted the match
Cerezo Osaka	Independiente
(Japan)	(Argentina)
0	1
- Date: 8 August 2018
- Venue: Yanmar Stadium Nagai, Osaka
- Referee: Matthew Conger (New Zealand)
- Attendance: 10,035

The 2018 Suruga Bank Championship (Japanese: スルガ銀行チャンピオンシップ2018; Spanish: Copa Suruga Bank 2018) was the eleventh edition of the Suruga Bank Championship (also referred to as the J.League Cup / Copa Sudamericana Championship Final), the club football match co-organized by the Japan Football Association, the football governing body of Japan, CONMEBOL, the football governing body of South America, and J.League, the professional football league of Japan, between the champions of the previous season's J.League Cup and Copa Sudamericana.

The match was contested between Japanese team Cerezo Osaka, the 2017 J.League Cup champions, and Argentinian team Independiente, the 2017 Copa Sudamericana champions. It was hosted by Cerezo Osaka at the Yanmar Stadium Nagai in Osaka, Japan on 8 August 2018.

Independiente defeated Cerezo Osaka 1–0 to win their first Suruga Bank Championship title.

== Teams ==
Team	Association / Confederation	Qualification	Previous appearances
(Japan) Cerezo Osaka	Japan Football Association	2017 J.League Cup champions	None
(Argentina) Independiente	CONMEBOL	2017 Copa Sudamericana champions	1 (2011)

== Format ==
The Suruga Bank Championship was played as a single match, with the J.League Cup winners hosting the match. If tied at the end of regulation, extra time would not be played, and the penalty shoot-out would be used to determine the winner. A maximum of six substitutions may be made during the match.

== Match ==
=== Details ===
8 August 2018
19:00 UTC+9

Cerezo Osaka (Japan)	0–1	(Argentina) Independiente
	Report (JFA); Report (J.League); Report (CONMEBOL)	Romero 28'

Yanmar Stadium Nagai, Osaka
Attendance: 10,035
Referee: Matthew Conger (New Zealand)

Cerezo Osaka	Independiente

GK	27	(Japan) Kenta Tanno
RB	20	(Japan) Noriyuki Sakemoto
CB	4	(Japan) Kota Fujimoto		(substituted off) 81'
CB	37	(Japan) Reiya Morishita
CB	23	(Japan) Tatsuya Yamashita		(substituted off) 59'
LB	5	(Japan) Yusuke Tanaka		(substituted off) 81'
RM	17	(Japan) Takaki Fukumitsu		(substituted off) 46'
CM	26	(Japan) Daichi Akiyama (c)	(yellow card) 79'
CM	43	(Spain) Osmar
LM	13	(Japan) Toshiyuki Takagi		(substituted off) 46'
CF	25	(Japan) Hirofumi Yamauchi		(substituted off) 59'
Substitutes:
GK	1	(Japan) Takumi Nagaishi
DF	16	(Japan) Eiichi Katayama		(substituted in) 81'
DF	22	(Croatia) Matej Jonjić		(substituted in) 81'
MF	11	(Brazil) Souza		(substituted in) 59'
MF	32	(Japan) Atomu Tanaka		(substituted in) 46'
MF	36	(Japan) Toshiki Onozawa		(substituted in) 46'
FW	40	(Japan) Mizuki Ando		(substituted in) 59'
Manager:
(South Korea) Yoon Jong-hwan

GK	25	(Uruguay) Martín Campaña (c)
RB	16	(Argentina) Fabricio Bustos
CB	2	(Argentina) Alan Franco
CB	4	(Argentina) Jorge Figal
LB	6	(Argentina) Juan Sánchez Miño		(substituted off) 79'
CM	22	(Chile) Francisco Silva		(substituted off) 78'
CM	19	(Chile) Pablo Hernández		(substituted off) 89'
RW	18	(Argentina) Silvio Romero		(substituted off) 68'
AM	8	(Argentina) Maximiliano Meza		(substituted off) 90+1'
LW	7	(Argentina) Martín Benítez		(substituted off) 71'
CF	9	(Argentina) Emmanuel Gigliotti	(yellow card) 90+2'
Substitutes:
GK	13	(Argentina) Milton Álvarez
DF	3	(Argentina) Guillermo Burdisso		(substituted in) 90+1'
DF	20	(Uruguay) Gastón Silva		(substituted in) 79'
MF	5	(Argentina) Nicolás Domingo		(substituted in) 78'
MF	10	(Ecuador) Fernando Gaibor		(substituted in) 89'
MF	21	(Uruguay) Carlos Benavídez		(substituted in) 68'
FW	32	(Argentina) Ezequiel Cerutti		(substituted in) 71'
Manager:
(Argentina) Ariel Holan

Assistant referees:
Mark Rule (New Zealand)
Mark Whitehead (New Zealand)
Fourth official:
Takuto Okabe (Japan)

== See also ==
- 2017 J.League Cup Final
- 2017 Copa Sudamericana Finals
