= Julián Vitale =

Argentine footballer

Personal information
- Date of birth: 21 July 1995 (age 31)
- Place of birth: Buenos Aires, Argentina
- Height: 1.82 m (5 ft 11 1/2 in)
- Position: Midfielder

Team information
- Current team: Almagro

Youth career
- 2002–2015: Independiente

Senior career*
Years	Team	Apps	(Gls)
2015–2020	Independiente	16	(0)
2017–2018	→ Unión Santa Fe (loan)	6	(0)
2018–2019	→ San Martín (loan)	13	(0)
2020–2024	Alvarado	81	(1)
2024–2025	Deportivo Morón	30	(0)
2025–	Almagro	39	(3)
- * Club domestic league appearances and goals as of 16:59, 22 April 2026 (UTC)

Julián Vitale (born 21 July 1995) is an Argentine professional footballer who plays as a midfielder for Almagro.

== Career ==
2015 saw Vitale start his professional as he was promoted into the first-team from the reserves. His debut for the club came on 31 May in a 1–0 win over Tigre at the Estadio Libertadores de América. On 27 August, Vitale made his continental debut in the 2015 Copa Sudamericana second stage first leg against fellow Argentine side Arsenal de Sarandí, a match that he also scored his first career goal in. In total, he made nineteen appearances in all competitions in his first season before making just one appearance in his second, in 2016. In the 2016–17 campaign, Vitale played in three of the club's first six fixtures.

On 2 August 2017, Vitale joined Unión Santa Fe on a season-long loan. He made his debut in the league versus Defensa y Justicia on 16 September. Newly promoted Argentine Primera División team San Martín completed the loan capture of Vitale in June 2018. After returning, Independiente put him to train with the reserve team, having planned to sell him if a good bid arrived. As of January 2020, he was still training with the reserve team. Vitale terminated his contract on 21 July, following an eighteen-year association with the club. He subsequently joined Primera B Nacional's Alvarado.

== Career statistics ==
As of 24 September 2020.

Club statistics
Club	Season	League			Cup		League Cup		Continental		Other		Total	
Club	Season	Division	Apps	Goals	Apps	Goals	Apps	Goals	Apps	Goals	Apps	Goals	Apps	Goals
Independiente	2015	Primera División	12	0	2	0	—		5 (Note: Appearance(s) in Copa Sudamericana)	1	0	0	19	1
Independiente	2016	Primera División	1	0	0	0	—		0	0	0	0	1	0
Independiente	2016–17	Primera División	3	0	2	0	—		0	0	0	0	5	0
Independiente	2017–18	Primera División	0	0	0	0	—		0	0	0	0	0	0
Independiente	2018–19	Primera División	0	0	0	0	0	0	0	0	0	0	0	0
Independiente	2019–20	Primera División	0	0	0	0	0	0	0	0	0	0	0	0
Independiente	Total		16	0	4	0	0	0	5	1	0	0	25	1
Unión Santa Fe (loan)	2017–18	Primera División	6	0	1	0	—		—		0	0	7	0
San Martín (loan)	2018–19	Primera División	13	0	1	0	1	0	—		0	0	15	0
Alvarado	2020–21	Primera B Nacional	0	0	0	0	—		—		0	0	0	0
Career total			35	0	6	0	1	0	5	1	0	0	47	1
