= 2017 Copa Sudamericana =

Copa CONMEBOL Sudamericana 2017

Tournament details
- Dates: 28 February – 13 December 2017
- Teams: 44+10 (from 10 associations)

Final positions
- Champions: (Argentina) Independiente (2nd title)
- Runners-up: (Brazil) Flamengo

Tournament statistics
- Matches played: 106
- Goals scored: 262 (2.47 per match)
- Top scorer(s): (Ecuador) Jhon Cifuente (Brazil) Felipe Vizeu (Argentina) Luis Miguel Rodríguez (5 goals each)

The 2017 Copa CONMEBOL Sudamericana was the 16th edition of the CONMEBOL Sudamericana (also referred to as the Copa Sudamericana, or Portuguese: Copa Sul-Americana), South America's secondary club football tournament organized by CONMEBOL.

Argentinian club Independiente defeated Brazilian club Flamengo in the finals by an aggregate score of 3–2 to win their second tournament title. As champions, Independiente earned the right to play against the winners of the 2017 Copa Libertadores in the 2018 Recopa Sudamericana, and the winners of the 2017 J.League Cup in the 2018 Suruga Bank Championship. They also automatically qualified for the 2018 Copa Libertadores group stage.

Chapecoense were the defending champions, but were eliminated by Flamengo in the round of 16. They qualified for the tournament after finishing third in their 2017 Copa Libertadores group.

== Format changes ==
Starting from this season, the following format changes were implemented:

- The tournament was expanded from 47 to 54 teams.
- A total of 44 teams directly entered the Copa Sudamericana, while a total of 10 teams eliminated from the Copa Libertadores (two best teams eliminated in the third stage of qualifying and eight third-placed teams in the group stage) were transferred to the Copa Sudamericana.
- The schedule of the tournament was extended to year-round so it would start in March and conclude in early December.
- As the Copa Libertadores and the Copa Sudamericana would be held concurrently, no team would be able to qualify for both tournaments in the same year (except those which were transferred from the Copa Libertadores to the Copa Sudamericana).
- The Copa Sudamericana champions would no longer directly qualify for the next edition as they would now directly qualify for the group stage of the Copa Libertadores (although they would still be able to defend their title if they finished third in the group stage).
- Brazil would be allocated six berths, decreased from eight.
- All teams directly entering the Copa Sudamericana would enter the first stage (previously teams from Argentina and Brazil entered the second stage).

Although CONMEBOL proposed to change the format of the final to be played as a single match at a venue to be chosen in advance, they later decided to keep the two-legged home-and-away format.

== Teams ==
The following 44 teams from the 10 CONMEBOL associations qualified for the tournament, entering the first stage:

- Argentina and Brazil: 6 berths each
- All other associations: 4 berths each

Association	Team (Berth)	Qualification method
(Argentina) Argentina; 6 berths	Independiente (Argentina 1)	2016 Primera División best team not qualified for 2017 Copa Libertadores
(Argentina) Argentina; 6 berths	Arsenal (Argentina 2)	2016 Primera División 2nd-best team not qualified for 2017 Copa Libertadores
(Argentina) Argentina; 6 berths	Defensa y Justicia (Argentina 3)	2016 Primera División 3rd-best team not qualified for 2017 Copa Libertadores
(Argentina) Argentina; 6 berths	Huracán (Argentina 4)	2016 Primera División 4th-best team not qualified for 2017 Copa Libertadores
(Argentina) Argentina; 6 berths	Gimnasia y Esgrima (Argentina 5)	2016 Primera División 5th-best team not qualified for 2017 Copa Libertadores
(Argentina) Argentina; 6 berths	Racing (Argentina 6)	2016 Primera División 6th-best team not qualified for 2017 Copa Libertadores
(Bolivia) Bolivia; 4 berths	Bolívar (Bolivia 1)	2015–16 Primera División aggregate table best team not qualified for 2017 Copa Libertadores
(Bolivia) Bolivia; 4 berths	Oriente Petrolero (Bolivia 2)	2015–16 Primera División aggregate table 2nd-best team not qualified for 2017 Copa Libertadores
(Bolivia) Bolivia; 4 berths	Nacional Potosí (Bolivia 3)	2015–16 Primera División aggregate table 3rd best team not qualified for 2017 Copa Libertadores
(Bolivia) Bolivia; 4 berths	Petrolero (Bolivia 4)	2015–16 Primera División aggregate table 4th best team not qualified for 2017 Copa Libertadores
(Brazil) Brazil; 6 berths	Corinthians (Brazil 1)	2016 Campeonato Brasileiro Série A best team not qualified for 2017 Copa Libertadores
(Brazil) Brazil; 6 berths	Ponte Preta (Brazil 2)	2016 Campeonato Brasileiro Série A 2nd-best team not qualified for 2017 Copa Libertadores
(Brazil) Brazil; 6 berths	São Paulo (Brazil 3)	2016 Campeonato Brasileiro Série A 3rd-best team not qualified for 2017 Copa Libertadores
(Brazil) Brazil; 6 berths	Cruzeiro (Brazil 4)	2016 Campeonato Brasileiro Série A 4th-best team not qualified for 2017 Copa Libertadores
(Brazil) Brazil; 6 berths	Fluminense (Brazil 5)	2016 Campeonato Brasileiro Série A 5th-best team not qualified for 2017 Copa Libertadores
(Brazil) Brazil; 6 berths	Sport Recife (Brazil 6)	2016 Campeonato Brasileiro Série A 6th-best team not qualified for 2017 Copa Libertadores
(Chile) Chile; 4 berths	O'Higgins (Chile 1)	2016 Primera División runners-up playoff losers
(Chile) Chile; 4 berths	Palestino (Chile 2)	2016 Apertura best team not qualified for 2017 Copa Libertadores
(Chile) Chile; 4 berths	Universidad de Chile (Chile 3)	2016 Apertura 2nd-best team not qualified for 2017 Copa Libertadores
(Chile) Chile; 4 berths	Everton (Chile 4)	2016 Copa Chile best team not qualified for 2017 Copa Libertadores
(Colombia) Colombia; 4 berths	Deportes Tolima (Colombia 1)	2016 Copa Colombia best team not qualified for 2017 Copa Libertadores
(Colombia) Colombia; 4 berths	Deportivo Cali (Colombia 2)	2016 Primera A aggregate table best team not qualified for 2017 Copa Libertadores
(Colombia) Colombia; 4 berths	Patriotas (Colombia 3)	2016 Primera A aggregate table 2nd-best team not qualified for 2017 Copa Libertadores
(Colombia) Colombia; 4 berths	Rionegro Águilas (Colombia 4)	2016 Primera A aggregate table 3rd best team not qualified for 2017 Copa Libertadores
(Ecuador) Ecuador; 4 berths	LDU Quito (Ecuador 1)	2016 Serie A aggregate table best team not qualified for 2017 Copa Libertadores
(Ecuador) Ecuador; 4 berths	Deportivo Cuenca (Ecuador 2)	2016 Serie A aggregate table 2nd-best team not qualified for 2017 Copa Libertadores
(Ecuador) Ecuador; 4 berths	Universidad Católica (Ecuador 3)	2016 Serie A aggregate table 3rd best team not qualified for 2017 Copa Libertadores
(Ecuador) Ecuador; 4 berths	Fuerza Amarilla (Ecuador 4)	2016 Serie A aggregate table 4th best team not qualified for 2017 Copa Libertadores
(Paraguay) Paraguay; 4 berths	Cerro Porteño (Paraguay 1)	2016 Primera División aggregate table best team not qualified for 2017 Copa Libertadores
(Paraguay) Paraguay; 4 berths	Sol de América (Paraguay 2)	2016 Primera División aggregate table 2nd-best team not qualified for 2017 Copa Libertadores
(Paraguay) Paraguay; 4 berths	Nacional (Paraguay 3)	2016 Primera División aggregate table 3rd-best team not qualified for 2017 Copa Libertadores
(Paraguay) Paraguay; 4 berths	Sportivo Luqueño (Paraguay 4)	2016 Primera División aggregate table 4th-best team not qualified for 2017 Copa Libertadores
(Peru) Peru; 4 berths	Alianza Lima (Peru 1)	2016 Descentralizado aggregate table best team not qualified for 2017 Copa Libertadores
(Peru) Peru; 4 berths	Comerciantes Unidos (Peru 2)	2016 Descentralizado aggregate table 2nd-best team not qualified for 2017 Copa Libertadores
(Peru) Peru; 4 berths	Sport Huancayo (Peru 3)	2016 Descentralizado aggregate table 3rd-best team not qualified for 2017 Copa Libertadores
(Peru) Peru; 4 berths	Juan Aurich (Peru 4)	2016 Descentralizado aggregate table 4th-best team not qualified for 2017 Copa Libertadores
(Uruguay) Uruguay; 4 berths	Danubio (Uruguay 1)	2016 Primera División best team not qualified for 2017 Copa Libertadores
(Uruguay) Uruguay; 4 berths	Defensor Sporting (Uruguay 2)	2016 Primera División 2nd-best team not qualified for 2017 Copa Libertadores
(Uruguay) Uruguay; 4 berths	Liverpool (Uruguay 3)	2016 Primera División 3rd-best team not qualified for 2017 Copa Libertadores
(Uruguay) Uruguay; 4 berths	Boston River (Uruguay 4)	2016 Primera División 4th-best team not qualified for 2017 Copa Libertadores
(Venezuela) Venezuela; 4 berths	Estudiantes de Caracas (Venezuela 1)	2016 Copa Venezuela best team not qualified for 2017 Copa Libertadores
(Venezuela) Venezuela; 4 berths	Atlético Venezuela (Venezuela 2)	2016 Clausura classification table best team not qualified for 2017 Copa Libertadores
(Venezuela) Venezuela; 4 berths	Caracas (Venezuela 3)	2016 Primera División aggregate table best team not qualified for 2017 Copa Libertadores
(Venezuela) Venezuela; 4 berths	Deportivo Anzoátegui (Venezuela 4)	2016 Primera División aggregate table 2nd-best team not qualified for 2017 Copa Libertadores

A further 10 teams eliminated from the 2017 Copa Libertadores were transferred to the Copa Sudamericana, entering the second stage.

Best teams eliminated in third stage
(Paraguay) Olimpia
(Colombia) Junior
Third-placed teams in group stage
(Argentina) Estudiantes
(Colombia) Santa Fe
(Colombia) Independiente Medellín
(Brazil) Flamengo
(Argentina) Atlético Tucumán
(Paraguay) Libertad
(Brazil) Chapecoense
(Chile) Deportes Iquique

== Schedule ==
The schedule of the competition was as follows.

Stage	Draw date	First leg	Second leg
First stage	31 January 2017 (Luque, Paraguay)	28 February – 2 March 2017; 4–6 April 2017	9–11 May 2017; 30 May – 1 June 2017
Second stage	14 June 2017 (Luque, Paraguay)	27–29 June 2017; 11–13 July 2017	25–27 July 2017; 1–3 August 2017
Round of 16	14 June 2017 (Luque, Paraguay)	22–24 August 2017; 12–14 September 2017	12–14 September 2017; 19–21 September 2017
Quarterfinals	14 June 2017 (Luque, Paraguay)	24–26 October 2017	31 October – 2 November 2017
Semifinals	14 June 2017 (Luque, Paraguay)	21, 23 November 2017	28, 30 November 2017
Finals	14 June 2017 (Luque, Paraguay)	6 December 2017	13 December 2017

== Draws ==
Location of teams of the 2017 Copa Sudamericana.
(L) Teams transferred from the 2017 Copa Libertadores

The draw for the first stage was held on 31 January 2017, 21:00 PYST (UTC−3), at the CONMEBOL Convention Centre in Luque, Paraguay. For the first stage, the teams were divided into two pots according to their geographical zones:

- Pot A (South Zone): 22 teams from Argentina, Bolivia, Chile, Paraguay, and Uruguay
- Pot B (North Zone): 22 teams from Brazil, Colombia, Ecuador, Peru, and Venezuela

The 44 teams were drawn into 22 ties (G1–G22) between a team from Pot A and a team from Pot B, with the teams from Pot B hosting the second leg in odd-numbered ties, and the teams from Pot A hosting the second leg in even-numbered ties. This distribution ensured that teams from the same association could not be drawn into the same tie. The draw for the second stage was held on 14 June 2017, 20:00 PYT (UTC−4), at the CONMEBOL Convention Center in Luque, Paraguay. For the second stage, the teams were allocated to two pots according to their previous results in this season:

- Pot 1: 10 teams transferred from the Copa Libertadores and six best winners of the first stage from the Copa Sudamericana
- Pot 2: 16 remaining winners of the first stage from the Copa Sudamericana

The 32 teams were drawn into 16 ties (O1–O16) between a team from Pot 1 and a team from Pot 2, with the teams from Pot 1 hosting the second leg. Teams from the same association could be drawn into the same tie.

== First stage ==
In the first stage, each tie was played on a home-and-away two-legged basis. If tied on aggregate, the away goals rule would be used. If still tied, extra time would not be played, and the penalty shoot-out would be used to determine the winner (Regulations Article 6.1).

The 22 winners of the first stage advanced to the second stage to join the 10 teams transferred from the Copa Libertadores (two best teams eliminated in the third stage of qualifying and eight third-placed teams in the group stage).

Team 1	Agg.	Team 2	1st leg	2nd leg
Nacional Potosí (Bolivia)	4–3	(Peru) Sport Huancayo	3–1	1–2
Deportivo Cali (Colombia)	2–2 (a)	(Paraguay) Sportivo Luqueño	1–0	1–2
Petrolero (Bolivia)	1–6	(Ecuador) Universidad Católica	1–3	0–3
LDU Quito (Ecuador)	4–3	(Uruguay) Defensor Sporting	2–2	2–1
Everton (Chile)	1–1 (3–4 p)	(Colombia) Patriotas	1–0	0–1
Estudiantes de Caracas (Venezuela)	3–10	(Paraguay) Sol de América	2–3	1–7
Cerro Porteño (Paraguay)	3–2	(Venezuela) Caracas	1–1	2–1
Deportivo Anzoátegui (Venezuela)	3–4	(Argentina) Huracán	3–0	0–4
Oriente Petrolero (Bolivia)	2–2 (8–7 p)	(Ecuador) Deportivo Cuenca	1–1	1–1
Corinthians (Brazil)	4–1	Universidad de Chile	2–0	2–1
Independiente (Argentina)	1–0	(Peru) Alianza Lima	0–0	1–0
Ponte Preta (Brazil)	1–1 (a)	(Argentina) Gimnasia y Esgrima	0–0	1–1
Boston River (Uruguay)	4–2	(Peru) Comerciantes Unidos	3–1	1–1
Juan Aurich (Peru)	1–8	(Argentina) Arsenal	0–2	1–6
O'Higgins (Chile)	1–2	(Ecuador) Fuerza Amarilla	1–0	0–2
Deportes Tolima (Colombia)	2–2 (a)	(Bolivia) Bolívar	2–1	0–1
Palestino (Chile)	1–1 (7–6 p)	Atlético Venezuela	0–1	1–0
Sport Recife (Brazil)	3–3 (4–2 p)	(Uruguay) Danubio	3–0	0–3
Racing (Argentina)	2–1	(Colombia) Rionegro Águilas	1–0	1–1
Cruzeiro (Brazil)	3–3 (2–3 p)	(Paraguay) Nacional	2–1	1–2
Defensa y Justicia (Argentina)	1–1 (a)	(Brazil) São Paulo	0–0	1–1
Fluminense (Brazil)	2–1	(Uruguay) Liverpool	2–0	0–1

== Second stage ==
In the second stage, each tie was played on a home-and-away two-legged basis. If tied on aggregate, the away goals rule would be used. If still tied, extra time would not be played, and the penalty shoot-out would be used to determine the winner (Regulations Article 6.1).

The 16 winners of the second stage advanced to the round of 16 of the knockout stages.

Team 1	Agg.	Team 2	1st leg	2nd leg
Racing (Argentina)	6–3	(Colombia) Independiente Medellín	3–1	3–2
Deportivo Cali (Colombia)	2–2 (2–3 p)	(Colombia) Junior	1–1	1–1
Palestino (Chile)	2–10	(Brazil) Flamengo	2–5	0–5
Nacional Potosí (Bolivia)	0–3	(Argentina) Estudiantes	0–1	0–2
Independiente (Argentina)	6–3	(Chile) Deportes Iquique	4–2	2–1
Bolívar (Bolivia)	1–1 (5–6 p)	(Ecuador) LDU Quito	1–0	0–1
Ponte Preta (Brazil)	4–1	(Paraguay) Sol de América	1–0	3–1
Fuerza Amarilla (Ecuador)	1–2	(Colombia) Santa Fe	1–1	0–1
Huracán (Argentina)	1–7	(Paraguay) Libertad	1–5	0–2
Sport Recife (Brazil)	3–2	(Argentina) Arsenal	2–0	1–2
Fluminense (Brazil)	6–1	(Ecuador) Universidad Católica	4–0	2–1
Oriente Petrolero (Bolivia)	2–6	(Argentina) Atlético Tucumán	2–3	0–3
Nacional (Paraguay)	3–3 (a)	(Paraguay) Olimpia	1–1	2–2
Defensa y Justicia (Argentina)	1–1 (2–4 p)	(Brazil) Chapecoense	1–0	0–1
Cerro Porteño (Paraguay)	6–2	(Uruguay) Boston River	2–1	4–1
Patriotas (Colombia)	1–3	(Brazil) Corinthians	1–1	0–2

== Final stages ==
Starting from the round of 16, the teams played a single-elimination tournament with the following rules:

- Each tie was played on a home-and-away two-legged basis, with the higher-seeded team hosting the second leg (Regulations Article 4.12).
- In the round of 16, quarterfinals, and semifinals, if tied on aggregate, the away goals rule would be used. If still tied, extra time would not be played, and the penalty shoot-out would be used to determine the winner (Regulations Article 6.1).
- In the finals, if tied on aggregate, the away goals rule would not be used, and 30 minutes of extra time would be played. If still tied after extra time, the penalty shoot-out would be used to determine the winner (Regulations Article 6.2).

=== Seeding ===
Starting from the round of 16, the teams were seeded according to the second stage draw, with each team assigned a "seed" 1–16 corresponding to the tie they won (O1–O16).

=== Bracket ===
The bracket was decided based on the second stage draw, which was held on 14 June 2017.

Round of 16
9	(Paraguay) Libertad	1	1	2
8	(Colombia) Santa Fe	0	1	1
16	(Brazil) Corinthians	1	0	1
1	(Argentina) Racing (a)	1	0	1
13	(Paraguay) Nacional	1	1	2
4	(Argentina) Estudiantes	0	0	0
12	(Argentina) Atlético Tucumán	1	0	1
5	(Argentina) Independiente	0	2	2
11	(Brazil) Fluminense (a)	1	1	2
6	(Ecuador) LDU Quito	0	2	2
14	(Brazil) Chapecoense	0	0	0
3	(Brazil) Flamengo	0	4	4
10	(Brazil) Sport Recife	3	0	3
7	(Brazil) Ponte Preta	1	1	2
15	(Paraguay) Cerro Porteño	0	1	1
2	(Colombia) Junior	0	3	3

Quarterfinals
9	(Paraguay) Libertad	1	0	1
1	(Argentina) Racing	0	0	0
13	(Paraguay) Nacional	1	0	1
5	(Argentina) Independiente	4	2	6
11	(Brazil) Fluminense	0	3	3
3	(Brazil) Flamengo	1	3	4
10	(Brazil) Sport Recife	0	0	0
2	(Colombia) Junior	2	0	2

Semifinals
9	(Paraguay) Libertad	1	1	2
5	(Argentina) Independiente	0	3	3
3	(Brazil) Flamengo	2	2	4
2	(Colombia) Junior	1	0	1

Finals
5	(Argentina) Independiente	2	1	3
3	(Brazil) Flamengo	1	1	2

=== Round of 16 ===
Team 1	Agg.	Team 2	1st leg	2nd leg
Corinthians (Brazil)	1–1 (a)	(Argentina) Racing	1–1	0–0
Cerro Porteño (Paraguay)	1–3	(Colombia) Junior	0–0	1–3
Chapecoense (Brazil)	0–4	(Brazil) Flamengo	0–0	0–4
Nacional (Paraguay)	2–0	(Argentina) Estudiantes	1–0	1–0
Atlético Tucumán (Argentina)	1–2	(Argentina) Independiente	1–0	0–2
Fluminense (Brazil)	2–2 (a)	(Ecuador) LDU Quito	1–0	1–2
Sport Recife (Brazil)	3–2	(Brazil) Ponte Preta	3–1	0–1
Libertad (Paraguay)	2–1	(Colombia) Santa Fe	1–0	1–1

=== Quarterfinals ===
Team 1	Agg.	Team 2	1st leg	2nd leg
Libertad (Paraguay)	1–0	(Argentina) Racing	1–0	0–0
Sport Recife (Brazil)	0–2	(Colombia) Junior	0–2	0–0
Fluminense (Brazil)	3–4	(Brazil) Flamengo	0–1	3–3
Nacional (Paraguay)	1–6	(Argentina) Independiente	1–4	0–2

=== Semifinals ===
Team 1	Agg.	Team 2	1st leg	2nd leg
Libertad (Paraguay)	2–3	(Argentina) Independiente	1–0	1–3
Flamengo (Brazil)	4–1	(Colombia) Junior	2–1	2–0

=== Finals ===
6 December 2017
20:45 UTC−3

Independiente (Argentina)	2–1	(Brazil) Flamengo
Gigliotti 28'; Meza 52'	Report	Réver 8'

Estadio Libertadores de América, Avellaneda
Attendance: 45,000
Referee: Mario Díaz de Vivar (Paraguay)

13 December 2017
21:45 UTC−2

Flamengo (Brazil)	1–1	(Argentina) Independiente
Lucas Paquetá 29'	Report	Barco 39' (pen.)

Estádio do Maracanã, Rio de Janeiro
Attendance: 62,567
Referee: Wilmar Roldán (Colombia)

Independiente won 3–2 on aggregate.

== Statistics ==
=== Top goalscorers ===
Rank	Player	Team	Goals
1	(Ecuador) Jhon Cifuente	(Ecuador) Universidad Católica	5
1	(Brazil) Felipe Vizeu	(Brazil) Flamengo	5
1	(Argentina) Luis Miguel Rodríguez	(Argentina) Atlético Tucumán	5
4	(Brazil) André	(Brazil) Sport Recife	4
4	(Paraguay) Óscar Cardozo	(Paraguay) Libertad	4
4	(Argentina) Leandro Fernández	(Argentina) Independiente	4
4	(Uruguay) Maximiliano Freitas	(Bolivia) Oriente Petrolero	4
4	(Argentina) Emmanuel Gigliotti	(Argentina) Independiente	4
4	(Brazil) Henrique Dourado	(Brazil) Fluminense	4
4	(Paraguay) Santiago Salcedo	(Paraguay) Libertad	4

Source: CONMEBOL

=== Top assists ===
Rank	Player	Team	Assists
1	(Brazil) Éverton	(Brazil) Flamengo	4
1	(Paraguay) Jorge Rojas	(Paraguay) Cerro Porteño	4
3	(Argentina) Rodrigo Aliendro	(Argentina) Atlético Tucumán	3
3	(Argentina) Ezequiel Barco	(Argentina) Independiente	3
3	(Peru) Miguel Trauco	(Brazil) Flamengo	3

Source: ESPN

== See also ==
- 2017 Copa Libertadores
- 2018 Recopa Sudamericana
- 2018 Suruga Bank Championship
