= J.League Cup / Copa Sudamericana Championship =

- Organiser(s): CONMEBOL; JFA
- Founded: 2008; 18 years ago
- Abolished: 2023
- Region: South America and Japan
- Teams: 2
- Last champions: (Brazil) Athletico Paranaense (1st title)
- Most championships: (Japan) Kashima Antlers (2 titles)
- Broadcaster(s): Fox Sports (Latin America) (until 2018); DirecTV Sports (South America) (2019); ESPN Brasil (2019); Fuji TV (Japan)

The J.League Cup / Copa Sudamericana Championship was an annual intercontinental football match held in Japan, contested by the reigning champions of the J.League Cup and the Copa Sudamericana.

The tournament was previously officially called the Suruga Bank Championship between 2008 and 2018 due to Sponsorship reasons. Starting in 2019, it was the J. League YBC Levain Cup / CONMEBOL Sudamericana Championship Final, using the official names of the two qualifying tournaments.

== History ==
The J.League Cup / Copa Sudamericana Championship was established in early 2008 by the Japan Football Association (JFA), CONMEBOL, and J. League, and sponsored by Suruga Bank in Japan. The championship is hosted annually at the J. League Cup champion's home stadium.

The first match was played on July 30, 2008, at Nagai Stadium in Osaka where Argentina's Arsenal defeated Japan's Gamba Osaka by 1–0.

== Records and statistics ==
=== List of finals ===
Ed.	Year	Country	Winner	Score	Runner-up	Country	Venue	City	Attend.
1	2008	ARG	Arsenal	1–0	Gamba Osaka	JPN	Nagai Stadium	Osaka	19,728
2	2009	BRA	Internacional	2–1	Oita Trinita	JPN	Ōita Stadium	Ōita	16,505
3	2010	JPN	FC Tokyo	2–2 (4–3 p)	LDU Quito	ECU	National Stadium	Tokyo	19,423
4	2011	JPN	Júbilo Iwata	2–2 (4–2 p)	Independiente	ARG	Shizuoka Stadium	Fukuroi	19,034
5	2012	JPN	Kashima Antlers	2–2 (7–6 p)	Universidad de Chile	CHI	Kashima Soccer Stadium	Kashima	20,021
6	2013	JPN	Kashima Antlers	3–2	São Paulo	BRA	Kashima Soccer Stadium	Kashima	26,695
7	2014	JPN	Kashiwa Reysol	2–1	Lanús	ARG	Hitachi Kashiwa Stadium	Kashiwa	10,140
8	2015	ARG	River Plate	3–0	Gamba Osaka	JPN	Osaka Expo '70 Stadium	Osaka	12,722
9	2016	COL	Santa Fe	1–0	Kashima Antlers	JPN	Kashima Soccer Stadium	Kashima	19,716
10	2017	JPN	Urawa Red Diamonds	1–0	Chapecoense	BRA	Saitama Stadium 2002	Saitama	11,002
11	2018	ARG	Independiente	1–0	Cerezo Osaka	JPN	Yanmar Stadium Nagai	Osaka	10,035
12	2019	BRA	Athletico Paranaense	4–0	Shonan Bellmare	JPN	Shonan BMW Stadium	Hiratsuka	9,129
–	2020	(Not held) (Note: Match Kawasaki Frontale vs Independiente del Valle not held due to 2020 Summer Olympics originally scheduled to be held at the same time, which ended up being suspended due to the COVID-19 pandemic.)							
–	2021	(Not held) (Note: Match FC Tokyo vs Defensa y Justicia not held due to 2020 Summer Olympics scheduled to be held at the same time.)							
–	2022	(Canceled)							
–	2023	(Abolished)							

=== Performances by club ===
Club	Titles	Runners-up	Seasons won	Seasons runner-up
(Japan) Kashima Antlers	2	1	2012, 2013	2016
(Argentina) Independiente	1	1	2018	2011
(Argentina) Arsenal	1	0	2008	
(Brazil) Internacional	1	0	2009	
(Japan) FC Tokyo	1	0	2010	
(Japan) Júbilo Iwata	1	0	2011	
(Japan) Kashiwa Reysol	1	0	2014	
(Argentina) River Plate	1	0	2015	
(Colombia) Santa Fe	1	0	2016	
(Japan) Urawa Red Diamonds	1	0	2017	
(Brazil) Athletico Paranaense	1	0	2019	
(Japan) Gamba Osaka	0	2	—	2008, 2015
(Japan) Oita Trinita	0	1	—	2009
(Ecuador) LDU Quito	0	1	—	2010
Universidad de Chile	0	1	—	2012
(Brazil) São Paulo	0	1	—	2013
(Argentina) Lanús	0	1	—	2014
(Brazil) Chapecoense	0	1	—	2017
(Japan) Cerezo Osaka	0	1	—	2018
(Japan) Shonan Bellmare	0	1	—	2019

=== Performances by nation ===
Nation	Titles	Runners-up	Winning clubs	Runners-up
Japan	6	6	Kashima Antlers (2), FC Tokyo (1), Júbilo Iwata (1), Kashiwa Reysol (1), Urawa Red Diamonds (1)	Gamba Osaka (2), Oita Trinita (1), Kashima Antlers (1), Cerezo Osaka (1), Shonan Bellmare (1)
Argentina	3	2	Arsenal (1), River Plate (1), Independiente (1)	Independiente (1), Lanús (1)
Brazil	2	2	Internacional (1), Athletico Paranaense (1)	São Paulo (1), Chapecoense (1)
Colombia	1	0	Santa Fe (1)	
Ecuador	0	1		LDU Quito (1)
Chile	0	1		Universidad de Chile (1)
