= 2016 Copa Sudamericana finals =

2016 Copa Sul-Americana
- Event: 2016 Copa Sudamericana
Atlético Nacional	Chapecoense
(Colombia)	(Brazil)
- Cancelled due to crash of LaMia Flight 2933, title awarded to Chapecoense

First leg
Atlético Nacional	Chapecoense
- Date: 30 November 2016 (cancelled)
- Venue: Estadio Atanasio Girardot, Medellín

Second leg
Chapecoense	Atlético Nacional
- Date: 7 December 2016 (cancelled)
- Venue: Estádio Couto Pereira, Curitiba

The 2016 Copa Sudamericana finals were scheduled to be the two-legged final that would have decided the winners of the 2016 Copa Sudamericana, the 15th edition of the Copa Sudamericana, South America's secondary international club football tournament organized by CONMEBOL.

The finals were scheduled to be contested in two-legged home-and-away format between Colombian team Atlético Nacional and Brazilian team Chapecoense. The first leg was scheduled to be hosted by Atlético Nacional at Estadio Atanasio Girardot in Medellín on 30 November 2016, while the second leg was scheduled to be hosted by Chapecoense at Estádio Couto Pereira in Curitiba on 7 December 2016. The winner would have earned the right to play against the 2016 Copa Libertadores winners in the 2017 Recopa Sudamericana, and against the 2016 J. League Cup winners in the 2017 Suruga Bank Championship. They also automatically qualified for the 2017 Copa Libertadores group stage.

However, the finals never took place. The matches were cancelled after the crash of LaMia Flight 2933, which was carrying the majority of the Chapecoense squad on their way to the first leg of the finals. CONMEBOL awarded the title to Chapecoense on 5 December 2016, following a request by Atlético Nacional.

Both teams would face each other at the 2017 Recopa Sudamericana, since Atlético Nacional won the 2016 edition of the Copa Libertadores, The Recopa title was won by Atlético Nacional.

== Teams ==
Team	Previous finals app.
(Colombia) Atlético Nacional	2 (2002, 2014)
(Brazil) Chapecoense	None

Atlético Nacional would have had the chance to complete the Copa Libertadores and Copa Sudamericana season double, having won the Copa Libertadores title earlier in 2016, while this would be the first South American club final for Chapecoense. Nowadays, that is not possible anymore, given that since 2017, both competitions are played simultaneously.

=== Road to the finals ===
Note: In all scores below, the score of the home team is given first.

(Colombia) Atlético Nacional			Round	(Brazil) Chapecoense		
Opponent	Venue	Score	Elimination stages	Opponent	Venue	Score
(Peru) Deportivo Municipal (won 6–0 on aggregate)	Away	0–5	First stage	Automatically advanced to Second stage		
(Peru) Deportivo Municipal (won 6–0 on aggregate)	Home	1–0	First stage	Automatically advanced to Second stage		
(Bolivia) Bolívar (won 2–1 on aggregate)	Away	1–1	Second stage	(Brazil) Cuiabá (won 3–2 on aggregate)	Away	1–0
(Bolivia) Bolívar (won 2–1 on aggregate)	Home	1–0	Second stage	(Brazil) Cuiabá (won 3–2 on aggregate)	Home	3–1
Seed 4			final stages	Seed 3		
(Paraguay) Sol de América (won 3–1 on aggregate)	Away	1–1	Round of 16	(Argentina) Independiente (tied 0–0 on aggregate, won on penalties)	Away	0–0
(Paraguay) Sol de América (won 3–1 on aggregate)	Home	2–0	Round of 16	(Argentina) Independiente (tied 0–0 on aggregate, won on penalties)	Home	0–0 (5–4 p)
(Brazil) Coritiba (won 4–2 on aggregate)	Away	1–1	Quarterfinals	(Colombia) Junior (won 3–1 on aggregate)	Away	1–0
(Brazil) Coritiba (won 4–2 on aggregate)	Home	3–1	Quarterfinals	(Colombia) Junior (won 3–1 on aggregate)	Home	3–0
(Paraguay) Cerro Porteño (tied 1–1 on aggregate, won on away goals)	Away	1–1	Semifinals	(Argentina) San Lorenzo (tied 1–1 on aggregate, won on away goals)	Away	1–1
(Paraguay) Cerro Porteño (tied 1–1 on aggregate, won on away goals)	Home	0–0	Semifinals	(Argentina) San Lorenzo (tied 1–1 on aggregate, won on away goals)	Home	0–0

== Format ==
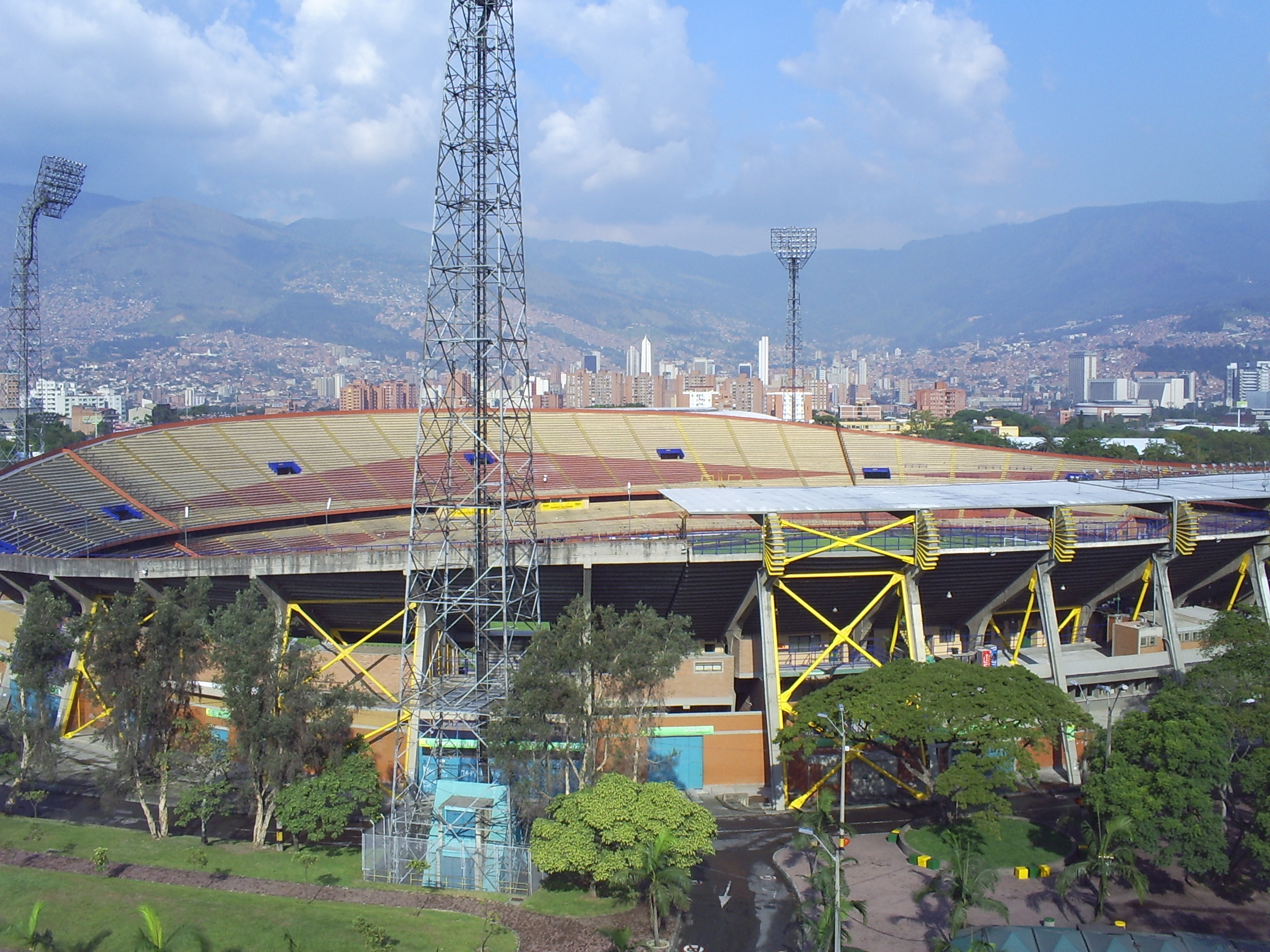
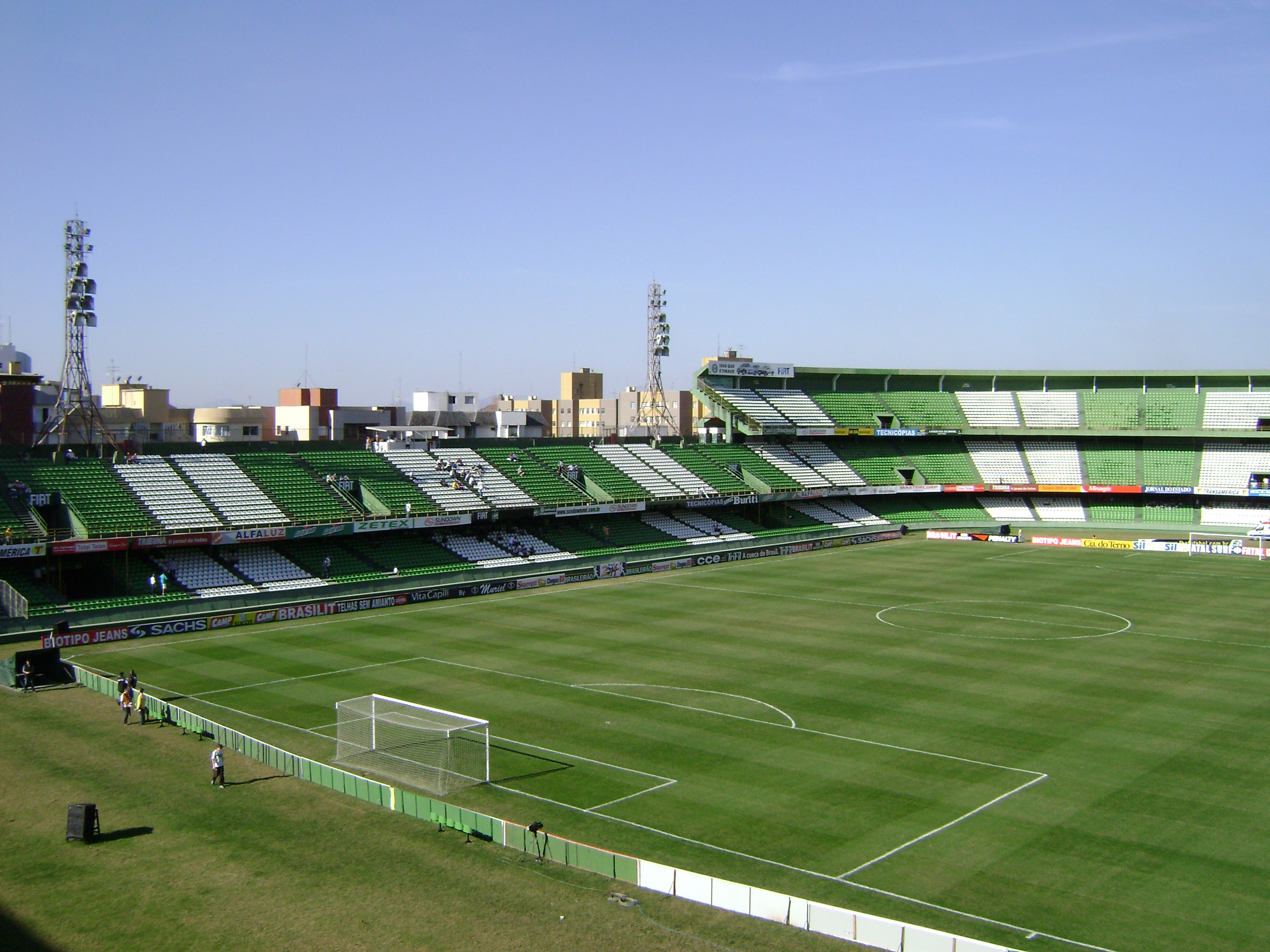
Estadio Atanasio Girardot in Medellín (left) and Estadio Couto Pereira in Curitiba were scheduled to host the series. Couto Pereira venue was chosen since Chapecoense's stadium, Arena Condá in Chapecó, did not have the minimum capacity of 40,000 spectators required by CONMEBOL.

The final would be played on a home-and-away two-legged basis, with the higher-seeded team hosting the second leg. If tied on aggregate, the away goals rule would not be used, and 30 minutes of extra time would be played. If still tied after extra time, the penalty shoot-out would be used to determine the winner.

== LaMia Flight 2933 crash ==
On 28 November 2016, LaMia Flight 2933, carrying the Chapecoense squad to the first leg, crashed on the way to the José María Córdova International Airport. There were 71 fatalities, including 19 of the 22 Chapecoense players on the plane. CONMEBOL immediately suspended all activities, including the scheduled final matches, in the early morning of 29 November.

In light of these events, Atlético Nacional requested that CONMEBOL award the title to Chapecoense. As requested, CONMEBOL awarded Chapecoense the title of the 2016 Copa Sudamericana, their first continental title, on 5 December, while Atlético Nacional received the "CONMEBOL Centenario Fair Play" award for their gesture.

== Match details ==
=== First leg ===
2016 Copa Sudamericana
30 November 2016
18:45 UTC−5
First leg

Atlético Nacional (Colombia)	(Cancelled)	(Brazil) Chapecoense
	Report

Estadio Atanasio Girardot, Medellín

Atlético Nacional invited fans to the Estadio Atanasio Girardot dressed in white with candles at the scheduled time of the first leg, to pay tribute in memory to the victims of the crash. A vigil was held on the same night at Chapecoense's stadium, the Arena Condá.

=== Second leg ===
7 December 2016
21:45 UTC−2
Second leg

Chapecoense (Brazil)	(Cancelled)	(Colombia) Atlético Nacional
	Report

Estádio Couto Pereira, Curitiba

Services were held in both the Estádio Couto Pereira, and Chapecoense's stadium, the Arena Condá, on the night that the second leg was scheduled.

== See also ==
- 2017 Recopa Sudamericana
- 2017 Suruga Bank Championship
- List of accidents involving sports teams
