= Carlos Morales =

Carlos Morales may refer to:

== Arts and entertainment ==
- Carlos Emilio Morales (1939–2014), Cuban jazz guitarist
- Carlos Morales (actor), Filipino actor
- Carlos Morales Macchiavello (1907–2004), Peruvian architect and politician, designed the Church of Our Lady of the Forsaken, Lima

== Government and politics ==
- Carlos Morales Abarzúa (1915–1988), Chilean lawyer and politician
- Carlos Morales Cañas (1908–1983), Chilean physician and politician
- Carlos Morales Languasco (1868–1914), Dominican priest, politician, and military figure
- Carlos Morales San Martín (1897–1972), Chilean physician and politician
- Carlos Morales Troncoso (1940–2014), Dominican vice-president and foreign minister
- Carlos Morales Vázquez (born 1957), Mexican politician
- Carlos Raúl Morales (born 1970), Guatemalan diplomat
- Carlos Augusto Morales López (born 1977), Mexican politician
- Carlos Mireles Morales (born 1937), Mexican politician

== Sports ==
- Carlos Luis Morales (born 1965), Ecuadorian football goalkeeper
- Carlos Morales (athlete) (born 1966), Chilean track and field sprinter
- Carlos Morales (footballer, born 1968), Paraguayan association football player
- Carlos María Morales (born 1970), Uruguayan footballer
- Carlos Adrián Morales (born 1979), Mexican football midfielder
- Carlos Morales (footballer, born 1982), Puerto Rican association football player
- Carlos Morales (footballer, born 2000), Chilean footballer

== Other ==
- Carlos Morales Quintana, Spanish architect and yachtsman, married to Princess Alexia of Greece and Denmark

== See also ==
- Carlos Machado Morales, Cuban soldier and infantry officer
