= Claudio González =

Claudio González may refer to:

- Claudio González (Argentine footballer) (1976–2026), Argentine football forward
- Claudio González (Chilean footballer) (born 1990), Chilean football goalkeeper
