= Giakumis Kodogiannis =

Chilean footballer (born 1992)

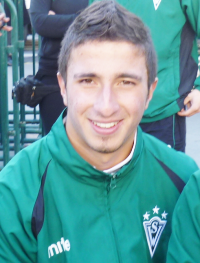

Personal information
- Full name: Giakumis Georgios Kodogiannis Valencia
- Date of birth: 13 April 1992 (age 34)
- Place of birth: Valparaíso, Chile
- Height: 1.70 m (5 ft 7 in)
- Position: Forward

Youth career
- El Esfuerzo
- Santiago Wanderers
- Premier Soccer Academy

Senior career*
Years	Team	Apps	(Gls)
2009–2015	Santiago Wanderers	23	(0)
2012	→ Deportes Puerto Montt (loan)	9	(0)
2013–2014	→ Unión La Calera (loan)	8	(0)
2015	San Luis	1	(0)
2016	Deportes Limache	–	(–)
Total		41	(0)
- * Club domestic league appearances and goals

Giakumis Georgios Kodogiannis Valencia (born April 13, 1992) is a Chilean former footballer who played as a forward.

== Career ==
As a child, Kodogiannis was with El Esfuerzo of the Alejo Barrios Association, joining Santiago Wanderers youth system in 2008. In addition, he was in the Premier Soccer Academy from Ohio, United States. In Chile he also played for Deportes Puerto Montt, Unión La Calera, San Luis and Deportes Limache.
