= Marcelo Flores (Chilean footballer) =

Chilean footballer

Personal information
- Full name: Marcelo Pablo Flores Vivallo
- Date of birth: 10 December 2001 (age 24)
- Place of birth: Los Ángeles, Chile
- Position: Left-back

Team information
- Current team: Deportes Limache
- Number: 4

Youth career
- Iberia

Senior career*
Years	Team	Apps	(Gls)
2019–2023	Iberia	87	(5)
2024–2025	Deportes Recoleta	23	(1)
2026–	Deportes Limache	7	(0)
- * Club domestic league appearances and goals as of 19 March 2026

Marcelo Pablo Flores Vivallo (born 10 December 2001) is a Chilean footballer who plays as a left-back for Deportes Limache in the Chilean Primera División.

== Club career ==
Born in Los Ángeles, Chile, Flores trialed with Colo-Colo and Huachipato before joining his hometown's club Iberia. He made his senior debut in 2019 and spent five seasons with them until 2023, when they were relegated to the Tercera A.

In January 2024, Flores moved to Deportes Recoleta.

In December 2025, Flores signed with Deportes Limache in the Chilean Primera División.
