= Víctor Rivero =

Chilean footballer and manager (born 1980)

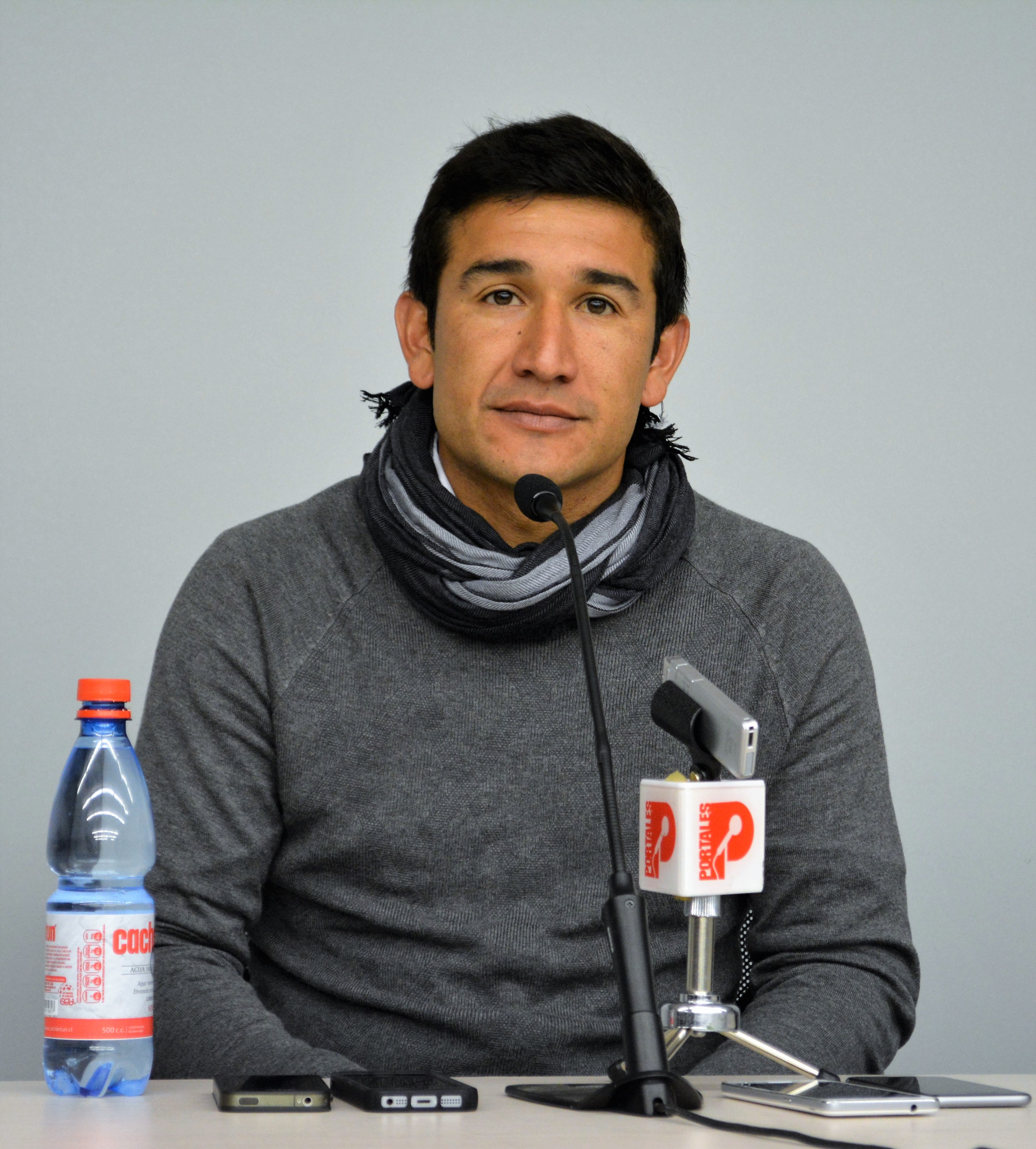
- Rivero in 2015

Personal information
- Full name: Víctor Javier Rivero Faccioli
- Date of birth: 15 March 1980 (age 46)
- Place of birth: Valparaíso, Chile
- Position: Goalkeeper

Team information
- Current team: Deportes Limache (manager)

Youth career
- Santiago Wanderers

Senior career*
Years	Team	Apps	(Gls)
2001	Municipal Limache		
2002–2004	San Luis		
2005–2010	Unión La Calera	27	(0)

Managerial career
- 2011–2012: Unión La Calera (assistant)
- 2012–2014: Palestino (assistant)
- 2014–2015: San Luis
- 2015–2016: Everton
- 2016–2017: Rangers
- 2017–2018: Unión La Calera
- 2019: Cobreloa
- 2020: San Luis
- 2021: Santiago Wanderers
- 2021: Unión San Felipe
- 2021–2022: Deportes Iquique
- 2022: Unión San Felipe
- 2023: Deportes Limache
- 2023: Unión San Felipe
- 2024–: Deportes Limache
- * Club domestic league appearances and goals

Víctor Javier Rivero Faccioli (born 15 March 1980) is a Chilean football manager and former player who played as a goalkeeper, currently in charge of Deportes Limache.

== Playing career ==
As a youth player, Rivero was with Santiago Wanderers. At senior level, he played for Municipal Limache, San Luis de Quillota and Unión La Calera.

== Coaching career ==
After three seasons as assistant coach and leading San Luis de Quillota, Everton de Viña del Mar and Rangers de Talca, he had a successful stint with Unión La Calera in 2017 winning the 2017 Transición of the Primera B.

In 2023, he signed with Deportes Limache in the Segunda División Profesional de Chile. At the end of 2023, he shortly assumed as coach of Unión San Felipe for the promotion mini-league, returning to Deportes Limache for the next season.

== Honors ==
=== As Manager ===
San Luis de Quillota

- Primera B de Chile (1): 2014–15

Unión La Calera

- Primera B de Chile (1): 2017

Deportes Limache

- Segunda División Profesional de Chile (1): 2023
