= Joaquín Montecinos =

Chilean footballer (born 1995)

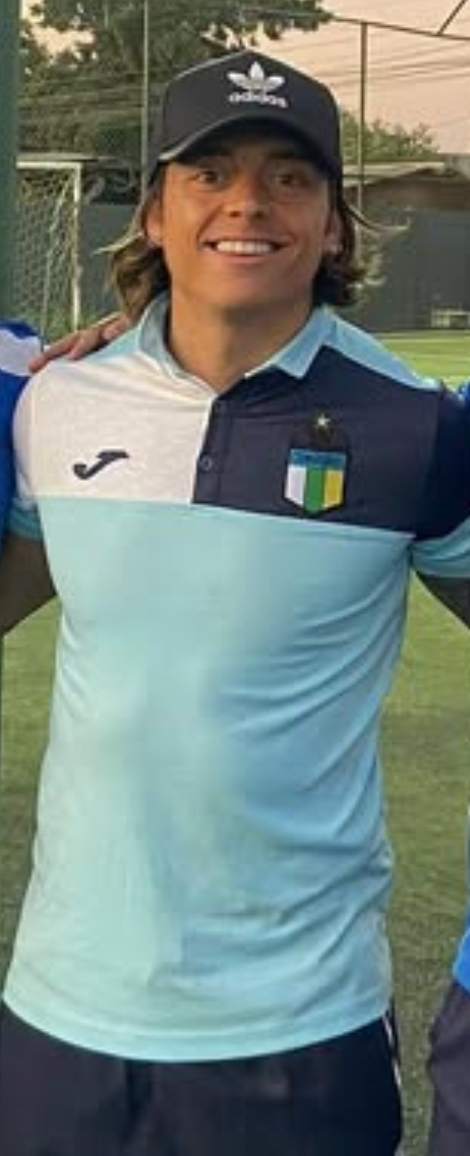
- Montecinos with O'Higgins in 2024

Personal information
- Full name: Joaquín Alberto Montecinos Naranjo
- Date of birth: 7 December 1995 (age 30)
- Place of birth: Barranquilla, Colombia
- Height: 1.70 m (5 ft 7 in)
- Position: Winger

Team information
- Current team: Deportes Concepción

Youth career
- Deportes La Serena

Senior career*
Years	Team	Apps	(Gls)
2012	Unión Temuco	1	(0)
2013–2018	Deportes La Serena	70	(3)
2019	San Luis	24	(3)
2019–2020	Deportes Melipilla	16	(4)
2020–2022	Audax Italiano	42	(8)
2022	→ Tijuana (loan)	13	(3)
2022–2025	Tijuana	27	(2)
2023–2024	→ Querétaro (loan)	9	(0)
2024–2025	→ O'Higgins (loan)	17	(2)
2026	Deportes Limache	19	(3)
2026–	Deportes Concepción	0	(0)

International career^{‡}
2014	Chile U21	2	(0)
2014	Chile U20		
2021–	Chile	7	(0)
- * Club domestic league appearances and goals as of 15 July 2026 ‡ National team caps and goals as of 09:10, 25 March 2022 (UTC)

Joaquín Alberto Montecinos Naranjo (born 7 December 1995) is a professional footballer who plays as a winger for Chilean Primera División club Deportes Concepción. Born in Colombia, he represented the Chile national team.

== Club career ==
In his early career he was with Deportes La Serena, but he was released and then joined Unión Temuco in the Primera B de Chile, making his professional debut at the age of 16. After returning to La Serena, while playing in the Primera B, the Chilean second division, Montecinos had the chance to play for a Chilean top flight team but got injured.

In 2017, he trialed with Celaya in Mexico but never signed because of economic issues.

In 2019, he signed for Deportes Melipilla, another second division team despite offers from the top flight, due to "wanting to go through stages, without rushing".

In 2022, Montecinos was loaned to Liga MX club Tijuana on a deal for a year with an option to buy. In July 2022, the option to buy was made and he was transferred on a deal until 2025.

In June 2023, Montecinos was loaned to Querétaro on a deal for a year. In August 2024, he moved back to Chile and joined O'Higgins on loan until the end of 2025. He ended his contract on 10 October 2025 with both Tijuana and O'Higgins.

On 23 December 2025, Montecinos joined Deportes Limache. On 15 July 2026, Montecinos switched to Deportes Concepción on an unofficial swap for Leonardo Valencia.

== International career ==
At the age of 18, he represented Chile U21 at the 2014 Toulon Tournament, making two appearances. In addition to this, he represented Chile U20 at the Torneo Cuatro Naciones Chile 2014, and was part of the training sessions for the 2015 South American U-20 Championship.

Despite he was born in Colombia, he stated his desire to play for the Chile senior team. So, he was called up to the Chile senior team for the 2022 FIFA World Cup qualifiers in October 2021. He debuted for Chile in a 2–0 loss to Peru on 7 October 2021.

== Personal life ==
Montecinos is the son of the Chilean former international footballer Cristián Montecinos and he was born when his father played for Junior de Barranquilla.

On 29 August 2025, Montecinos married the Argentine model Sabrina Sosa.
