= 2016 Copa Sudamericana final stages =

The 2016 Copa Sudamericana final stages were scheduled to be played from 20 September to 7 December 2016. A total of 16 teams competed in the final stages to decide the champions of the 2016 Copa Sudamericana.

== Qualified teams ==
The 15 winners of the second stage (eight from winners of the first stage, four from Brazil, three from Argentina) and the defending champions qualified for the final stages.

Winners of the second stage			Defending champions
Winners of the first stage	Brazil	Argentina	Defending champions
Winner O13: (Paraguay) Sol de América; Winner O8: (Paraguay) Cerro Porteño; Winner O6: (Colombia) Junior; Winner O10: (Chile) Palestino; Winner O4: (Colombia) Atlético Nacional; Winner O16: (Colombia) Independiente Medellín; Winner O2: (Venezuela) Deportivo La Guaira; Winner O11: (Uruguay) Montevideo Wanderers	Winner O3: (Brazil) Chapecoense; Winner O1: (Brazil) Santa Cruz; Winner O12: (Brazil) Coritiba; Winner O7: (Brazil) Flamengo	Winner O14: (Argentina) Independiente; Winner O15: (Argentina) San Lorenzo; Winner O5: (Argentina) Belgrano	Winner O9: (Colombia) Santa Fe

== Seeding ==
The qualified teams were seeded in the final stages according to the draw of the tournament, with each team assigned a "seed" 1–16 by draw.

Seed	Team	Round of 16
1	(Brazil) Santa Cruz	Match A
2	(Venezuela) Deportivo La Guaira	Match B
3	(Brazil) Chapecoense	Match C
4	(Colombia) Atlético Nacional	Match D
5	(Argentina) Belgrano	Match E
6	(Colombia) Junior	Match F
7	(Brazil) Flamengo	Match G
8	(Paraguay) Cerro Porteño	Match H
9	(Colombia) Santa Fe	Match H
10	(Chile) Palestino	Match G
11	(Uruguay) Montevideo Wanderers	Match F
12	(Brazil) Coritiba	Match E
13	(Paraguay) Sol de América	Match D
14	(Argentina) Independiente	Match C
15	(Argentina) San Lorenzo	Match B
16	(Colombia) Independiente Medellín	Match A

== Format ==
In the final stages, the 16 teams played a single-elimination tournament, with the following rules:

- Each tie was played on a home-and-away two-legged basis, with the higher-seeded team hosting the second leg (Regulations Article 3.2).
- In the round of 16, quarterfinals, and semifinals, if tied on aggregate, the away goals rule would be used. If still tied, extra time would not be played, and the penalty shoot-out would be used to determine the winner (Regulations Article 5.1).
- In the finals, if tied on aggregate, the away goals rule would not be used, and 30 minutes of extra time would be played. If still tied after extra time, the penalty shoot-out would be used to determine the winner (Regulations Article 5.2).

CONMEBOL confirmed that the bracket would remain the same as the draw of the tournament regardless of the nationality of the semifinalists. In previous seasons, if there were two semifinalists from the same association, they had to play each other.

== Bracket ==
The bracket of the final stages was determined by the seeding as follows:

- Round of 16:
  - Match A: Seed 1 vs. Seed 16
  - Match B: Seed 2 vs. Seed 15
  - Match C: Seed 3 vs. Seed 14
  - Match D: Seed 4 vs. Seed 13
  - Match E: Seed 5 vs. Seed 12
  - Match F: Seed 6 vs. Seed 11
  - Match G: Seed 7 vs. Seed 10
  - Match H: Seed 8 vs. Seed 9
- Quarterfinals:
  - Match S1: Winner A vs. Winner H
  - Match S2: Winner B vs. Winner G
  - Match S3: Winner C vs. Winner F
  - Match S4: Winner D vs. Winner E
- Semifinals:
  - Match F1: Winner S1 vs. Winner S4
  - Match F2: Winner S2 vs. Winner S3
- Finals: Winner F1 vs. Winner F2

Round of 16
16	(Colombia) Independiente Medellín (a)	2	1	3
1	(Brazil) Santa Cruz	0	3	3
9	(Colombia) Santa Fe	2	1	3
8	(Paraguay) Cerro Porteño	0	4	4
12	(Brazil) Coritiba (p)	1	2	3 (4)
5	(Argentina) Belgrano	2	1	3 (3)
13	(Paraguay) Sol de América	1	0	1
4	(Colombia) Atlético Nacional	1	2	3
15	(Argentina) San Lorenzo	2	2	4
2	(Venezuela) Deportivo La Guaira	1	0	1
10	(Chile) Palestino (a)	0	2	2
7	(Brazil) Flamengo	1	1	2
11	(Uruguay) Montevideo Wanderers	0	0	0 (3)
6	(Colombia) Junior (p)	0	0	0 (4)
14	(Argentina) Independiente	0	0	0 (4)
3	(Brazil) Chapecoense (p)	0	0	0 (5)

Quarterfinals
16	(Colombia) Independiente Medellín	0	0	0
8	(Paraguay) Cerro Porteño	0	2	2
12	(Brazil) Coritiba	1	1	2
4	(Colombia) Atlético Nacional	1	3	4
15	(Argentina) San Lorenzo	2	0	2
10	(Chile) Palestino	0	1	1
6	(Colombia) Junior	1	0	1
3	(Brazil) Chapecoense	0	3	3

Semifinals
8	(Paraguay) Cerro Porteño	1	0	1
4	(Colombia) Atlético Nacional (a)	1	0	1
15	(Argentina) San Lorenzo	1	0	1
3	(Brazil) Chapecoense (a)	1	0	1

Finals
4	(Colombia) Atlético Nacional	—	—	—
3	(Brazil) Chapecoense (awd.)	—	—	—

== Round of 16 ==
The first legs were played on 20–22 September, and the second legs were played on 27–29 September 2016.

Team 1	Agg.	Team 2	1st leg	2nd leg
Independiente Medellín (Colombia)	3–3 (a)	(Brazil) Santa Cruz	2–0	1–3
San Lorenzo (Argentina)	4–1	(Venezuela) Deportivo La Guaira	2–1	2–0
Independiente (Argentina)	0–0 (4–5 p)	(Brazil) Chapecoense	0–0	0–0
Sol de América (Paraguay)	1–3	(Colombia) Atlético Nacional	1–1	0–2
Coritiba (Brazil)	3–3 (4–3 p)	(Argentina) Belgrano	1–2	2–1
Montevideo Wanderers (Uruguay)	0–0 (3–4 p)	(Colombia) Junior	0–0	0–0
Palestino (Chile)	2–2 (a)	(Brazil) Flamengo	0–1	2–1
Santa Fe (Colombia)	3–4	(Paraguay) Cerro Porteño	2–0	1–4

=== Match A ===
21 September 2016
19:45 UTC−5

Independiente Medellín (Colombia)	2–0	(Brazil) Santa Cruz
Hechalar 38'; Cortés 87'	Report

Estadio Atanasio Girardot, Medellín
Referee: Raúl Orosco (Bolivia)

28 September 2016
21:45 UTC−3

Santa Cruz (Brazil)	3–1	(Colombia) Independiente Medellín
Grafite 13', 30', 70'	Report	Ibargüen 76'

Estádio do Arruda, Recife
Referee: José Argote (Venezuela)

Tied 3–3 on aggregate, Independiente Medellín won on away goals and advanced to the quarterfinals (Match S1).

=== Match B ===
22 September 2016
19:15 UTC−3

San Lorenzo (Argentina)	2–1	(Venezuela) Deportivo La Guaira
Belluschi 10'; Blandi 41'	Report	Lucena 51'

Estadio Pedro Bidegain, Buenos Aires
Referee: Wilson Lamouroux (Colombia)

29 September 2016
18:15 UTC−4

Deportivo La Guaira (Venezuela)	0–2	(Argentina) San Lorenzo
	Report	Más 18'; Blandi 32'

Estadio Metropolitano de Lara, Barquisimeto
Referee: Andrés Cunha (Uruguay)

San Lorenzo won 4–1 on aggregate and advanced to the quarterfinals (Match S2).

=== Match C ===
21 September 2016
19:15 UTC−3

Independiente (Argentina)	0–0	(Brazil) Chapecoense
	Report

Estadio Libertadores de América, Avellaneda
Referee: Carlos Orbe (Ecuador)

28 September 2016
19:15 UTC−3

Chapecoense (Brazil)	0–0	(Argentina) Independiente
	Report
Penalties
Willian Thiego (penalty missed); Cléber Santana (penalty missed); Filipe Machado (penalty scored); Dener (penalty scored); Bruno Rangel (penalty scored); Gil (penalty missed); Matheus Biteco (penalty scored); Tiaguinho (penalty scored)	5–4	(penalty missed) Benítez; (penalty scored) Vera; (penalty missed) Rigoni; (penalty scored) Figal; (penalty scored) Cuesta; (penalty missed) Sánchez Miño; (penalty scored) Toledo; (penalty missed) Tagliafico

Arena Condá, Chapecó
Referee: Roddy Zambrano (Ecuador)

Tied 0–0 on aggregate, Chapecoense won on penalties and advanced to the quarterfinals (Match S3).

=== Match D ===
20 September 2016
19:45 UTC−4

Sol de América (Paraguay)	1–1	(Colombia) Atlético Nacional
Velázquez Ramos 88'	Report	Mosquera 13'

Estadio Luis Alfonso Giagni, Asunción
Referee: Juan Soto (Venezuela)

27 September 2016
19:45 UTC−5

Atlético Nacional (Colombia)	2–0	(Paraguay) Sol de América
Bocanegra 57'; Berrío 82'	Report

Estadio Atanasio Girardot, Medellín
Referee: Christian Ferreyra (Uruguay)

Atlético Nacional won 3–1 on aggregate and advanced to the quarterfinals (Match S4).

=== Match E ===
21 September 2016
21:45 UTC−3

Coritiba (Brazil)	1–2	(Argentina) Belgrano
Leandro 75' (pen.)	Report	Bieler 3'; Luján 49'

Estádio Couto Pereira, Curitiba
Referee: Christian Ferreyra (Uruguay)

28 September 2016
21:45 UTC−3

Belgrano (Argentina)	1–2	(Brazil) Coritiba
Bieler 29'	Report	Iago 42'; Bareiro 64'
Penalties
Suárez (penalty scored); Bieler (penalty scored); Lema (penalty scored); Luna (penalty missed); Álvarez Suárez (penalty missed)	3–4	(penalty missed) Leandro; (penalty scored) Bernardo; (penalty scored) Juan; (penalty scored) González; (penalty scored) Wilson

Estadio Mario Alberto Kempes, Córdoba
Referee: Julio Bascuñán (Chile)

Tied 3–3 on aggregate, Coritiba won on penalties and advanced to the quarterfinals (Match S4).

=== Match F ===
21 September 2016
19:15 UTC−3

Montevideo Wanderers (Uruguay)	0–0	(Colombia) Junior
	Report

Estadio Luis Franzini, Montevideo
Referee: Julio Quintana (Paraguay)

28 September 2016
17:15 UTC−5

Junior (Colombia)	0–0	(Uruguay) Montevideo Wanderers
	Report
Penalties
V. Hernández (penalty scored); Ovelar (penalty scored); J. Sánchez (penalty missed); Rangel (penalty scored); Toloza (penalty scored)	4–3	(penalty scored) Blanco; (penalty scored) Gómez; (penalty scored) Gáspari; (penalty missed) Vergés; (penalty missed) Rivero

Estadio Metropolitano Roberto Meléndez, Barranquilla
Referee: Roberto Tobar (Chile)

Tied 0–0 on aggregate, Junior won on penalties and advanced to the quarterfinals (Match S3).

=== Match G ===
21 September 2016
21:45 UTC−3

Palestino (Chile)	0–1	(Brazil) Flamengo
	Report	Emerson 78'

Estadio Monumental David Arellano, Santiago
Attendance: 6,995
Referee: Jonhatan Fuentes (Uruguay)

28 September 2016
21:45 UTC−3

Flamengo (Brazil)	1–2	(Chile) Palestino
Alan Patrick 64' (pen.)	Report	Cereceda 32'; Valencia 45'

Estádio Kléber Andrade, Cariacica
Referee: Diego Haro (Peru)

Tied 2–2 on aggregate, Palestino won on away goals and advanced to the quarterfinals (Match S2).

=== Match H ===
22 September 2016
19:45 UTC−5

Santa Fe (Colombia)	2–0	(Paraguay) Cerro Porteño
Gómez 14' (pen.), 74'	Report

Estadio Metropolitano de Techo, Bogotá
Referee: Sandro Ricci (Brazil)

29 September 2016
20:45 UTC−4

Cerro Porteño (Paraguay)	4–1	(Colombia) Santa Fe
Domínguez 4' (pen.), 9', 88'; Torales 43'	Report	Gómez 77' (pen.)

Estadio Defensores del Chaco, Asunción
Referee: Patricio Loustau (Argentina)

Cerro Porteño won 4–3 on aggregate and advanced to the quarterfinals (Match S1).

== Quarterfinals ==
The first legs were played on 18–20 October, and the second legs were played on 25–27 October 2016.

Team 1	Agg.	Team 2	1st leg	2nd leg
Independiente Medellín (Colombia)	0–2	(Paraguay) Cerro Porteño	0–0	0–2
San Lorenzo (Argentina)	2–1	(Chile) Palestino	2–0	0–1
Junior (Colombia)	1–3	(Brazil) Chapecoense	1–0	0–3
Coritiba (Brazil)	2–4	(Colombia) Atlético Nacional	1–1	1–3

=== Match S1 ===
18 October 2016
19:00 UTC−5

Independiente Medellín (Colombia)	0–0	(Paraguay) Cerro Porteño
	Report

Estadio Atanasio Girardot, Medellín
Referee: Andrés Cunha (Uruguay)

25 October 2016
21:00 UTC−3

Cerro Porteño (Paraguay)	2–0	(Colombia) Independiente Medellín
Domínguez 33', 72' (pen.)	Report

Estadio Defensores del Chaco, Asunción
Referee: Mauro Vigliano (Argentina)

Cerro Porteño won 2–0 on aggregate and advanced to the semifinals (Match F1).

=== Match S2 ===
20 October 2016
21:00 UTC−3

San Lorenzo (Argentina)	2–0	(Chile) Palestino
Cauteruccio 6'; Blandi 33'	Report

Estadio Pedro Bidegain, Buenos Aires
Referee: Anderson Daronco (Brazil)

27 October 2016
21:00 UTC−3

Palestino (Chile)	1–0	(Argentina) San Lorenzo
Valencia 69'	Report

Estadio Monumental David Arellano, Santiago
Referee: Christian Ferreyra (Uruguay)

San Lorenzo won 2–1 on aggregate and advanced to the semifinals (Match F2).

=== Match S3 ===
19 October 2016
18:45 UTC−5

Junior (Colombia)	1–0	(Brazil) Chapecoense
Escalante 37'	Report

Estadio Metropolitano Roberto Meléndez, Barranquilla
Referee: Juan Soto (Venezuela)

26 October 2016
21:45 UTC−2

Chapecoense (Brazil)	3–0	(Colombia) Junior
Ananias 35'; Gil 43'; William Thiego 76'	Report

Arena Condá, Chapecó
Referee: Enrique Cáceres (Paraguay)

Chapecoense won 3–1 on aggregate and advanced to the semifinals (Match F2).

=== Match S4 ===
19 October 2016
21:45 UTC−2

Coritiba (Brazil)	1–1	(Colombia) Atlético Nacional
Iago 85'	Report	Borja 13'

Estádio Couto Pereira, Curitiba
Referee: Roberto Tobar (Chile)

26 October 2016
18:45 UTC−5

Atlético Nacional (Colombia)	3–1	(Brazil) Coritiba
Borja 51', 59', 72' (pen.)	Report	González 43'

Estadio Atanasio Girardot, Medellín
Referee: Víctor Carrillo (Peru)

Atlético Nacional won 4–2 on aggregate and advanced to the semifinals (Match F1).

== Semifinals ==
The first legs were played on 1–2 November, and the second legs were played on 23–24 November 2016.

Team 1	Agg.	Team 2	1st leg	2nd leg
Cerro Porteño (Paraguay)	1–1 (a)	(Colombia) Atlético Nacional	1–1	0–0
San Lorenzo (Argentina)	1–1 (a)	(Brazil) Chapecoense	1–1	0–0

=== Match F1 ===
1 November 2016
20:45 UTC−3

Cerro Porteño (Paraguay)	1–1	(Colombia) Atlético Nacional
Domínguez 45+4' (pen.)	Report	Pereira 82' (o.g.)

Estadio Defensores del Chaco, Asunción
Referee: Néstor Pitana (Argentina)

24 November 2016
19:45 UTC−5

Atlético Nacional (Colombia)	0–0	(Paraguay) Cerro Porteño
	Report

Estadio Atanasio Girardot, Medellín
Referee: Julio Bascuñán (Chile)

Tied 1–1 on aggregate, Atlético Nacional won on away goals and advanced to the finals.

=== Match F2 ===
2 November 2016
20:45 UTC−3

San Lorenzo (Argentina)	1–1	(Brazil) Chapecoense
Cauteruccio 29'	Report	Ananias 61'

Estadio Pedro Bidegain, Buenos Aires
Referee: Roberto Tobar (Chile)

23 November 2016
21:45 UTC−2

Chapecoense (Brazil)	0–0	(Argentina) San Lorenzo
	Report

Arena Condá, Chapecó
Referee: Daniel Fedorczuk (Uruguay)

Tied 1–1 on aggregate, Chapecoense won on away goals and advanced to the finals.

== Finals ==
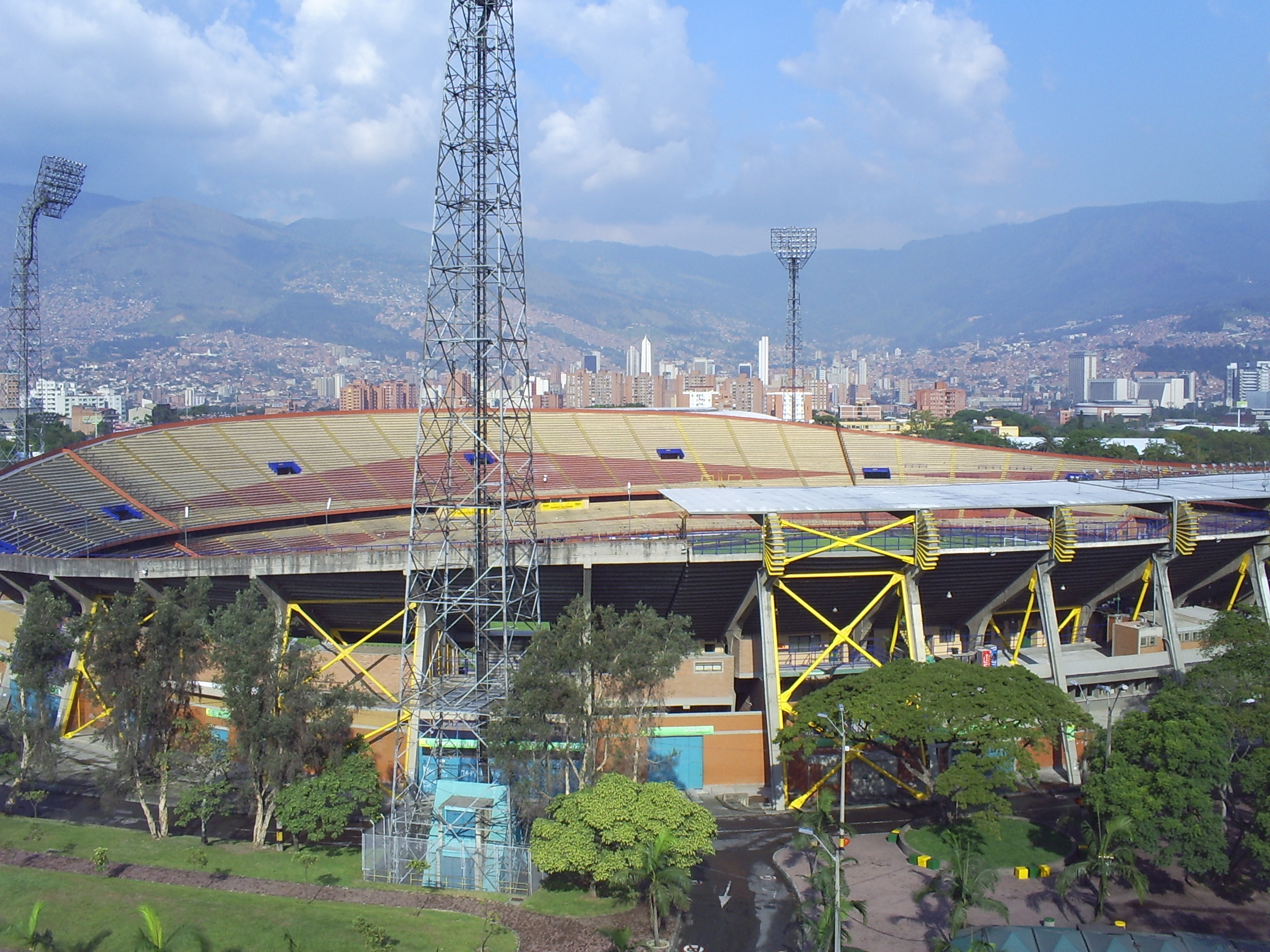
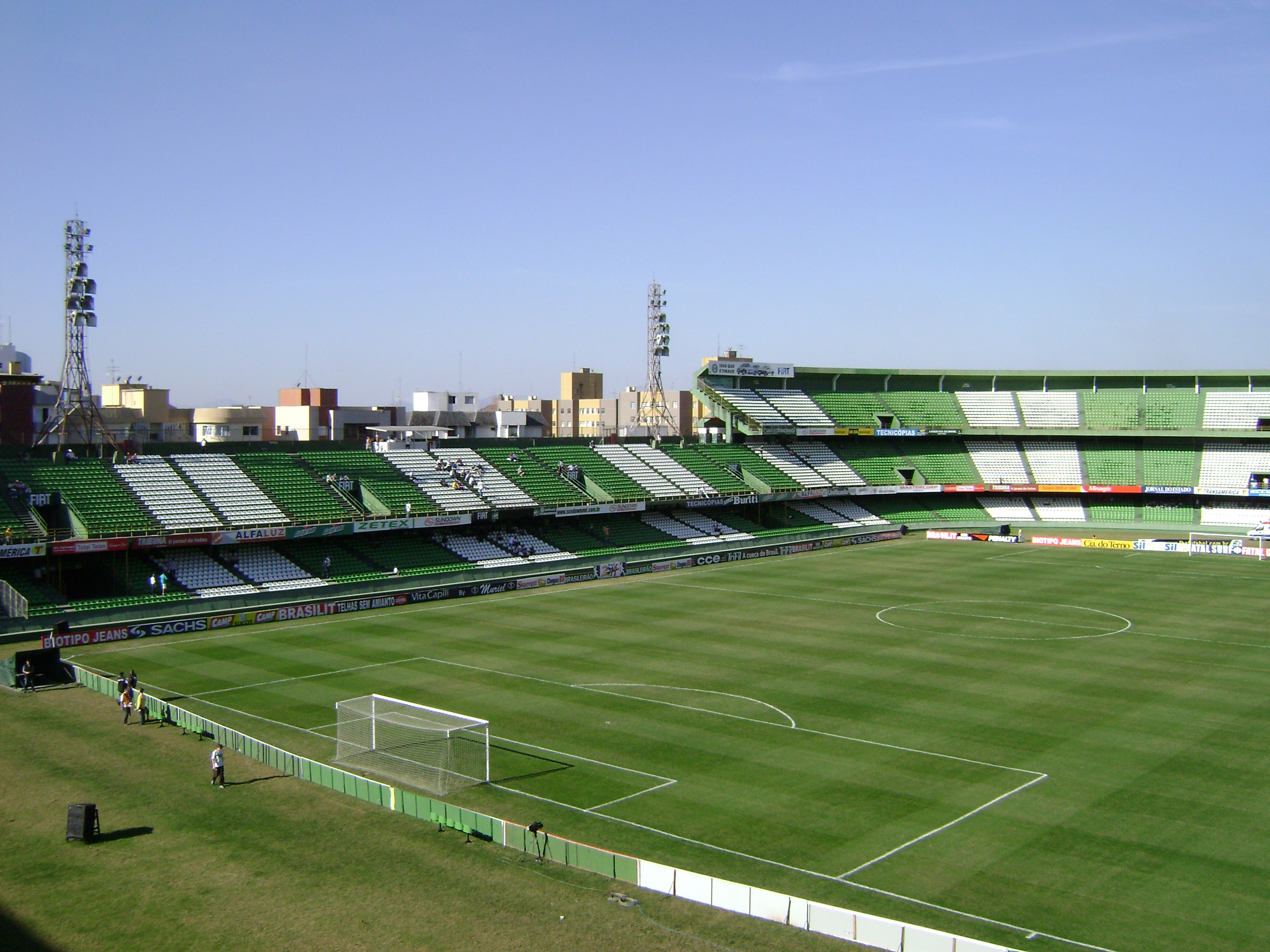
Estadio Atanasio Girardot in Medellín (left) and Estadio Couto Pereira in Curitiba were scheduled to host the series. Couto Pereira venue was chosen since Chapecoense's stadium, Arena Condá in Chapecó, did not have the minimum capacity of 40,000 spectators required by CONMEBOL.

The final would be played on a home-and-away two-legged basis, with the higher-seeded team hosting the second leg. If tied on aggregate, the away goals rule would not be used, and 30 minutes of extra time would be played. If still tied after extra time, the penalty shoot-out would be used to determine the winner.

The first leg was scheduled to be played on 30 November, and the second leg was scheduled to be played on 7 December 2016. The finals were suspended on 29 November following the crash of LaMia Flight 2933. CONMEBOL awarded the title to Chapecoense on 5 December 2016.

Team 1	Agg.	Team 2	1st leg	2nd leg
Atlético Nacional (Colombia)	awd.	(Brazil) Chapecoense	Cancelled	Cancelled

30 November 2016
18:45 UTC−5

Atlético Nacional (Colombia)	Cancelled	(Brazil) Chapecoense

Estadio Atanasio Girardot, Medellín

7 December 2016
21:45 UTC−2

Chapecoense (Brazil)	Cancelled	(Colombia) Atlético Nacional

Estádio Couto Pereira, Curitiba
