= Yerko González =

Chilean footballer

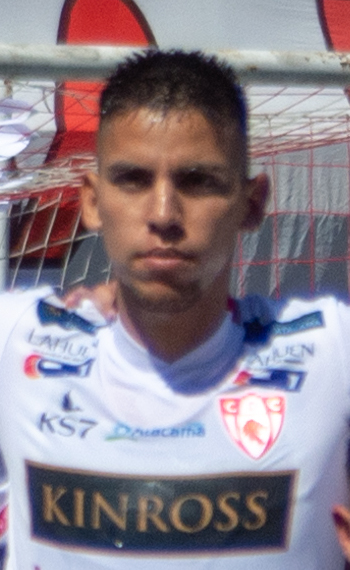
- González with Deportes Copiapó in 2024

Personal information
- Full name: Yerko Alexander González Santis
- Date of birth: 20 August 2001 (age 25)
- Place of birth: Rancagua, Chile
- Height: 1.80 m (5 ft 11 in)
- Position: Right-back

Team information
- Current team: Deportes Limache
- Number: --

Youth career
- O'Higgins

Senior career*
Years	Team	Apps	(Gls)
2019–2020	O'Higgins	2	(0)
2020–2021	Louletano	6	(0)
2021–2025	Unión San Felipe	80	(5)
2024	→ Deportes Copiapó (loan)	17	(1)
2026–	Deportes Limache	0	(0)
- * Club domestic league appearances and goals as of 4 November 2025

Yerko Alexander González Santis (born 20 August 2001) is a Chilean footballer who plays as a right-back for Deportes Limache.

== Club career ==
A product of O'Higgins, González got a youth championship and made his professional debut in the Chilean Primera División under Marco Antonio Figueroa in 2019. In October 2020, he moved to Europe and signed with Portuguese club Louletano.

Back in Chile, González joined Unión San Felipe in the second half of 2021. In 2024, he was loaned out to Deportes Copiapó in the Chilean Primera División. He returned to Unión San Felipe for the 2025 season. He ended his contract with Unión San Felipe at the end of the 2025 season.

In December 2025, González joined Deportes Limache.

== International career ==
In 2019, González took part in training microcycles of Chile U20 under Patricio Ormazábal.
