= Augusto Aguirre =

Argentine footballer

Personal information
- Full name: Augusto Ezequiel Aguirre
- Date of birth: 2 August 1999 (age 27)
- Place of birth: Corrientes, Argentina
- Height: 1.84 m (6 ft 0 in)
- Position: Centre-back

Team information
- Current team: Deportes Limache
- Number: 2

Youth career
- Club Alvear (C)
- Boca Unidos
- 2015–2017: River Plate

Senior career*
| Years | Team | Apps | (Gls) |
| 2017–2022 | River Plate | 1 | (0) |
| 2021 | → Godoy Cruz (loan) | 3 | (0) |
| 2022 | → San Martín SJ (loan) | 22 | (1) |
| 2023 | San Martín SJ | 30 | (1) |
| 2024 | Tigre | 7 | (0) |
| 2024 | Temperley | 18 | (0) |
| 2025– | Deportes Limache | 0 | (0) |
- * Club domestic league appearances and goals as of 31 January 2025

Augusto Ezequiel Aguirre (born 2 August 1999) is an Argentine professional footballer who plays as a centre-back for Chilean club Deportes Limache.

== Career ==
Aguirre played for Club Alvear in his hometown, which preceded him joining Boca Unidos. In 2015, River Plate signed Aguirre. He was selected for his debut at the age of eighteen midway through the 2017–18 Primera División season, with Marcelo Gallardo playing the defender for the full duration of a 4–0 away loss on 28 October 2017 against Talleres. He wouldn't appear for the club across the next three seasons, though did make the substitute's bench four times in 2020–21.

February 2021 saw Aguirre depart on loan to fellow Primera División club Godoy Cruz. He debuted in a home win over newly promoted Platense on 6 March. In January 2022, Aguirre was loaned out once again, this time to Primera Nacional side San Martín SJ until the end of the year.

On 6 January 2024, Aguirre returned to the Primera División to sign for Tigre.

On 19 June 2024, Aguirre moved to Temperley on a 1.5-year contract.

In January 2025, Aguirre moved to Chile and joined Deportes Limache.

== Career statistics ==
As of 15 April 2024.

Club statistics
| Club | Season | League | | | Cup | | League Cup | | Continental | | Other | | Total | |
| Club | Season | Division | Apps | Goals | Apps | Goals | Apps | Goals | Apps | Goals | Apps | Goals | Apps | Goals |
|---|---|---|---|---|---|---|---|---|---|---|---|---|---|---|
| River Plate | 2017–18 | Primera División | 1 | 0 | 0 | 0 | — | | 0 | 0 | 0 | 0 | 1 | 0 |
| River Plate | 2018–19 | Primera División | 0 | 0 | 0 | 0 | 0 | 0 | 0 | 0 | 0 | 0 | 0 | 0 |
| River Plate | 2019–20 | Primera División | 0 | 0 | 0 | 0 | 0 | 0 | 0 | 0 | 0 | 0 | 0 | 0 |
| River Plate | 2020–21 (Note: Soccerway counts 2020 Copa de la Liga Profesional appearances as league appearances.) | Primera División | 0 | 0 | 0 | 0 | 0 | 0 | 0 | 0 | 0 | 0 | 0 | 0 |
| River Plate | 2021 (Note: Soccerway counts 2021 Copa de la Liga Profesional appearances as league appearances.) | Primera División | 0 | 0 | 0 | 0 | — | | 0 | 0 | 0 | 0 | 0 | 0 |
| River Plate | Total | | 1 | 0 | 0 | 0 | 0 | 0 | 0 | 0 | 0 | 0 | 1 | 0 |
| Godoy Cruz (loan) | 2021 | Primera División | 0 | 0 | 0 | 0 | 3 | 0 | — | | 0 | 0 | 3 | 0 |
| San Martín SJ (loan) | 2022 | Primera Nacional | 22 | 1 | 0 | 0 | – | | – | | 0 | 0 | 22 | 1 |
| San Martín SJ | 2023 | Primera Nacional | 30 | 1 | 2 | 0 | – | | – | | 0 | 0 | 32 | 1 |
| Tigre | 2024 | Primera División | 0 | 0 | 0 | 0 | 7 | 0 | – | | 0 | 0 | 7 | 0 |
| Career total | | | 53 | 2 | 2 | 0 | 10 | 0 | 0 | 0 | 0 | 0 | 65 | 2 |
