= Hugo Martínez (footballer) =

Paraguayan footballer (born 2000)

Personal information
- Full name: Hugo Javier Martínez Cantero
- Date of birth: 27 April 2000 (age 26)
- Place of birth: Santa Elena, Paraguay
- Height: 1.70 m (5 ft 7 in)
- Position: Midfielder

Team information
- Current team: Deportes Limache

Youth career
- Libertad

Senior career*
| Years | Team | Apps | (Gls) |
| 2018–2026 | Libertad | 127 | (3) |
| 2026– | Deportes Limache | 0 | (0) |

International career^{‡}
| 2021– | Paraguay | 2 | (0) |
- * Club domestic league appearances and goals as of 8 July 2026 ‡ National team caps and goals as of 2 September 2021

Hugo Javier Martínez Cantero, known as Hugo Martínez (born 27 April 2000) is a Paraguayan professional footballer who plays as a midfielder for Chilean club Deportes Limache.

== Club career ==
A product of Libertad, Martínez moved to Chile and signed with Deportes Limache on 3 July 2026.

== International career ==
He made his debut for the Paraguay national football team on 2 September 2021 in a World Cup qualifier against Ecuador, a 0–2 away loss. He started the game and was substituted after 65 minutes of play.
