= 2016 Copa Sudamericana elimination stages =

The 2016 Copa Sudamericana elimination stages were played from 9 August to 15 September 2016. A total of 46 teams competed in the elimination stages to decide 15 of the 16 places in the final stages of the 2016 Copa Sudamericana.

== Draw ==
The draw of the tournament was held on 12 July 2016, 20:00 CLT (UTC−4), at the Espacio Riesco Convention and Events Center in Huechuraba, Chile.

For the first stage, the 32 teams were divided into two zones:

- South Zone: The 16 teams from Bolivia, Chile, Paraguay, and Uruguay were drawn into eight ties.
- North Zone: The 16 teams from Colombia, Ecuador, Peru, and Venezuela were drawn into eight ties.

Teams which qualified for berths 1 were drawn against teams which qualified for berths 4, and teams which qualified for berths 2 were drawn against teams which qualified for berths 3, with the former hosting the second leg in both cases. Teams from the same association could not be drawn into the same tie.

Pots for the first stage draw
Zone	Berths 1	Berths 2	Berths 3	Berths 4
South Zone	(Bolivia) Bolívar; (Chile) Universidad Católica; (Paraguay) Cerro Porteño; (Uruguay) Peñarol	(Bolivia) Jorge Wilstermann; (Chile) O'Higgins; (Paraguay) Libertad; (Uruguay) Plaza Colonia	(Bolivia) Blooming; (Chile) Palestino; (Paraguay) Sol de América; (Uruguay) Montevideo Wanderers	(Bolivia) Real Potosí; (Chile) Universidad de Concepción; (Paraguay) Sportivo Luqueño; (Uruguay) Fénix
North Zone	(Colombia) Junior; (Ecuador) Emelec; (Peru) Real Garcilaso; (Venezuela) Deportivo La Guaira	(Colombia) Atlético Nacional; (Ecuador) Universidad Católica; (Peru) Sport Huancayo; (Venezuela) Zamora	(Colombia) Independiente Medellín; (Ecuador) Barcelona; (Peru) Deportivo Municipal; (Venezuela) Deportivo Anzoátegui	(Colombia) Deportes Tolima; (Ecuador) Aucas; (Peru) Universitario; (Venezuela) Deportivo Lara

For the second stage, the 30 teams, including the 16 winners of the first stage (eight from South Zone, eight from North Zone), whose identity was not known at the time of the draw, and the 14 teams which entered the second stage, were divided into three sections:

- Winners of the first stage: The 16 winners of the first stage were drawn into eight ties, with the order of legs decided by draw. Teams from the same association could be drawn into the same tie.
- Brazil: The eight teams from Brazil were drawn into four ties. Teams which qualified for berths 1–4 were drawn against teams which qualified for berths 5–8, with the former hosting the second leg.
- Argentina: The six teams from Argentina were drawn into three ties. Teams which qualified for berths 1–3 were drawn against teams which qualified for berths 4–6, with the former hosting the second leg.

Pots for the second stage draw
Winners of the first stage	Brazil		Argentina	
Winners of the first stage	Seeded	Unseeded	Seeded	Unseeded
Winner G1; Winner G2; Winner G3; Winner G4; Winner G5; Winner G6; Winner G7; Winner G8; Winner G9; Winner G10; Winner G11; Winner G12; Winner G13; Winner G14; Winner G15; Winner G16	1. (Brazil) Sport Recife; 2. (Brazil) Flamengo; 3. (Brazil) Chapecoense; 4. (Brazil) Coritiba	5. (Brazil) Figueirense; 6. (Brazil) Vitória; 7. (Brazil) Santa Cruz; 8. (Brazil) Cuiabá	1. (Argentina) San Lorenzo; 2. (Argentina) Independiente; 3. (Argentina) Belgrano	4. (Argentina) Estudiantes; 5. (Argentina) Banfield; 6. (Argentina) Lanús

== Format ==
In the elimination stages (first stage and second stage), each tie was played on a home-and-away two-legged basis. If tied on aggregate, the away goals rule would be used. If still tied, extra time would not be played, and the penalty shoot-out would be used to determine the winner (Regulations Article 5.1). The 15 winners of the second stage (eight from winners of the first stage, four from Brazil, three from Argentina) advanced to the round of 16 to join the defending champions (Santa Fe).

== First stage ==
The first legs were played on 9–11 August, and the second legs were played on 16–18 August 2016.

Team 1	Agg.	Team 2	1st leg	2nd leg
South Zone
Fénix (Uruguay)	1–2	(Paraguay) Cerro Porteño	1–0	0–2
Sportivo Luqueño (Paraguay)	1–1 (a)	(Uruguay) Peñarol	0–0	1–1
Universidad de Concepción (Chile)	2–3	(Bolivia) Bolívar	2–0	0–3
Real Potosí (Bolivia)	4–2	(Chile) Universidad Católica	3–1	1–1
Blooming (Bolivia)	1–1 (4–1 p)	(Uruguay) Plaza Colonia	1–0	0–1
Sol de América (Paraguay)	2–2 (5–4 p)	(Bolivia) Jorge Wilstermann	1–1	1–1
Montevideo Wanderers (Uruguay)	0–0 (5–4 p)	(Chile) O'Higgins	0–0	0–0
Palestino (Chile)	4–0	(Paraguay) Libertad	1–0	3–0
North Zone
Universitario (Peru)	1–6	(Ecuador) Emelec	0–3	1–3
Aucas (Ecuador)	2–2 (a)	(Peru) Real Garcilaso	2–1	0–1
Deportivo Lara (Venezuela)	2–5	(Colombia) Junior	1–3	1–2
Deportes Tolima (Colombia)	0–1	(Venezuela) Deportivo La Guaira	0–0	0–1
Barcelona (Ecuador)	2–2 (0–3 p)	(Venezuela) Zamora	1–1	1–1
Independiente Medellín (Colombia)	2–1	(Ecuador) Universidad Católica	1–1	1–0
Deportivo Anzoátegui (Venezuela)	2–2 (a)	(Peru) Sport Huancayo	2–1	0–1
Deportivo Municipal (Peru)	0–6	(Colombia) Atlético Nacional	0–5	0–1

=== Match G1 ===
9 August 2016
21:15 UTC−3

Fénix (Uruguay)	1–0	(Paraguay) Cerro Porteño
Cantera 3'	Report

Estadio Luis Franzini, Montevideo
Referee: Fernando Rapallini (Argentina)

17 August 2016
20:00 UTC−4

Cerro Porteño (Paraguay)	2–0	(Uruguay) Fénix
Pereira 4'; P. Velázquez 90+2'	Report

Estadio Defensores del Chaco, Asunción
Referee: Wilmar Roldán (Colombia)

Cerro Porteño won 2–1 on aggregate and advanced to the second stage (Match O8).

=== Match G2 ===
9 August 2016
18:15 UTC−4

Sportivo Luqueño (Paraguay)	0–0	(Uruguay) Peñarol
	Report

Estadio Feliciano Cáceres, Luque
Referee: Raphael Claus (Brazil)

16 August 2016
20:30 UTC−3

Peñarol (Uruguay)	1–1	(Paraguay) Sportivo Luqueño
Bressan 90+2'	Report	Mendieta 90+1'

Estadio Campeón del Siglo, Montevideo
Referee: Ricardo Marques (Brazil)

Tied 1–1 on aggregate, Sportivo Luqueño won on away goals and advanced to the second stage (Match O16).

=== Match G3 ===
10 August 2016
18:00 UTC−4

Universidad de Concepción (Chile)	2–0	(Bolivia) Bolívar
Meneses 49', 59'	Report

Estadio Alcaldesa Ester Roa Rebolledo, Concepción
Referee: Éber Aquino (Paraguay)

16 August 2016
17:00 UTC−4

Bolívar (Bolivia)	3–0	(Chile) Universidad de Concepción
Fierro 3', 86'; Cellerino 9'	Report

Estadio Hernando Siles, La Paz
Referee: Daniel Fedorczuk (Uruguay)

Bolívar won 3–2 on aggregate and advanced to the second stage (Match O4).

=== Match G4 ===
9 August 2016
20:30 UTC−4

Real Potosí (Bolivia)	3–1	(Chile) Universidad Católica
Cuesta 8'; Borda 47'; Alpire 50'	Report	Cordero 73'

Estadio Víctor Agustín Ugarte, Potosí
Referee: Jesús Valenzuela (Venezuela)

17 August 2016
21:00 UTC−3

Universidad Católica (Chile)	1–1	(Bolivia) Real Potosí
Noir 31'	Report	Rojano 79'

Estadio San Carlos de Apoquindo, Santiago
Referee: Wilson Lamouroux (Colombia)

Real Potosí won 4–2 on aggregate and advanced to the second stage (Match O8).

=== Match G5 ===
11 August 2016
19:00 UTC−4

Blooming (Bolivia)	1–0	(Uruguay) Plaza Colonia
João Paulo 18'	Report

Estadio Ramón Tahuichi Aguilera, Santa Cruz de la Sierra
Referee: José Argote (Venezuela)

17 August 2016
18:30 UTC−3

Plaza Colonia (Uruguay)	1–0	(Bolivia) Blooming
Ale Corvalán 50'	Report
Penalties
Bogliacino (penalty missed); Caseras (penalty missed); Leyes (penalty scored)	1–4	(penalty scored) Vaca; (penalty scored) João Paulo; (penalty scored) Loras; (penalty scored) Hurtado

Estadio Profesor Alberto Suppici, Colonia del Sacramento
Referee: Víctor Carrillo (Peru)

Tied 1–1 on aggregate, Blooming won on penalties and advanced to the second stage (Match O6).

=== Match G6 ===
10 August 2016
20:00 UTC−4

Sol de América (Paraguay)	1–1	(Bolivia) Jorge Wilstermann
E. Álvarez 80'	Report	G. Álvarez 51'

Estadio Luis Alfonso Giagni, Asunción
Referee: Esteban Ostojich (Uruguay)

18 August 2016
17:30 UTC−4

Jorge Wilstermann (Bolivia)	1–1	(Paraguay) Sol de América
Thomaz 47'	Report	Díaz 55'
Penalties
Thomaz (penalty scored); Chávez (penalty scored); Olego (penalty scored); Bergese (penalty missed); Olivares (penalty scored); Suárez (penalty missed)	4–5	(penalty missed) E. Álvarez; (penalty scored) Sosa; (penalty scored) Samaniego; (penalty scored) Melgarejo; (penalty scored) Díaz; (penalty scored) Paredes

Estadio Félix Capriles, Cochabamba
Referee: Carlos Orbe (Ecuador)

Tied 2–2 on aggregate, Sol de América won on penalties and advanced to the second stage (Match O13).

=== Match G7 ===
10 August 2016
21:00 UTC−3

Montevideo Wanderers (Uruguay)	0–0	(Chile) O'Higgins
	Report

Estadio Luis Franzini, Montevideo
Referee: Carlos Orbe (Ecuador)

16 August 2016
20:30 UTC−3

O'Higgins (Chile)	0–0	(Uruguay) Montevideo Wanderers
	Report
Penalties
Opazo (penalty scored); Medel (penalty scored); Insaurralde (penalty scored); Torrealba (penalty scored); Lezcano (penalty missed); Acevedo (penalty missed)	4–5	(penalty scored) Santos; (penalty scored) González; (penalty missed) Colombino; (penalty scored) Vergés; (penalty scored) de Olivera; (penalty scored) Gómez

Estadio El Teniente, Rancagua
Referee: Enrique Cáceres (Paraguay)

Tied 0–0 on aggregate, Montevideo Wanderers won on penalties and advanced to the second stage (Match O11).

=== Match G8 ===
11 August 2016
19:45 UTC−4

Palestino (Chile)	1–0	(Paraguay) Libertad
Benegas 25'	Report

Estadio Monumental David Arellano, Santiago
Attendance: 3,099
Referee: Darío Herrera (Argentina)

18 August 2016
20:30 UTC−4

Libertad (Paraguay)	0–3	(Chile) Palestino
	Report	Á. Martínez 46' (o.g.); Valencia 76' (pen.); Torres 80'

Estadio Dr. Nicolás Léoz, Asunción
Referee: Patricio Loustau (Argentina)

Palestino won 4–0 on aggregate and advanced to the second stage (Match O10).

=== Match G9 ===
9 August 2016
21:30 UTC−5

Universitario (Peru)	0–3	(Ecuador) Emelec
	Report	Achilier 52'; Stracqualursi 61', 80'

Estadio Nacional, Lima
Referee: Wilson Lamouroux (Colombia)

16 August 2016
21:00 UTC−5

Emelec (Ecuador)	3–1	(Peru) Universitario
Giménez 22'; Stracqualursi 37' (pen.); Mena 68'	Report	Rengifo 32'

Estadio Christian Benítez Betancourt, Guayaquil
Referee: Raúl Orosco (Bolivia)

Emelec won 6–1 on aggregate and advanced to the second stage (Match O2).

=== Match G10 ===
11 August 2016
16:30 UTC−5

Aucas (Ecuador)	2–1	(Peru) Real Garcilaso
Villacrés 34'; Rojas 37'	Report	Cosme 18'

Estadio Gonzalo Pozo Ripalda, Quito
Referee: Gustavo Murillo (Colombia)

17 August 2016
21:15 UTC−5

Real Garcilaso (Peru)	1–0	(Ecuador) Aucas
Valverde 29'	Report

Estadio Monumental de la UNSA, Arequipa
Referee: Jesús Valenzuela (Venezuela)

Tied 2–2 on aggregate, Real Garcilaso won on away goals and advanced to the second stage (Match O10).

=== Match G11 ===
9 August 2016
18:00 UTC−4

Deportivo Lara (Venezuela)	1–3	(Colombia) Junior
J. Hernández 2'	Report	Ovelar 1', 85'; J. Sánchez 75'

Estadio Metropolitano de Lara, Barquisimeto
Referee: Eduardo Gamboa (Chile)

16 August 2016
21:00 UTC−5

Junior (Colombia)	2–1	(Venezuela) Deportivo Lara
Toloza 44'; Viera 51'	Report	C. González 62'

Estadio Metropolitano Roberto Meléndez, Barranquilla
Referee: Jorge Osorio (Chile)

Junior won 5–2 on aggregate and advanced to the second stage (Match O6).

=== Match G12 ===
11 August 2016
20:15 UTC−5

Deportes Tolima (Colombia)	0–0	(Venezuela) Deportivo La Guaira
	Report

Estadio Manuel Murillo Toro, Ibagué
Referee: Dewson Freitas (Brazil)

17 August 2016
17:30 UTC−4

Deportivo La Guaira (Venezuela)	1–0	(Colombia) Deportes Tolima
Mosquera 2' (o.g.)	Report

Estadio Metropolitano de Lara, Barquisimeto
Referee: Mario Díaz de Vivar (Paraguay)

Deportivo La Guaira won 1–0 on aggregate and advanced to the second stage (Match O2).

=== Match G13 ===
10 August 2016
21:15 UTC−5

Barcelona (Ecuador)	1–1	(Venezuela) Zamora
Vera 53'	Report	Soteldo 81' (pen.)

Estadio Monumental Isidro Romero Carbo, Guayaquil
Referee: Óscar Rojas (Uruguay)

18 August 2016
18:00 UTC−4

Zamora (Venezuela)	1–1	(Ecuador) Barcelona
Blanco 86'	Report	M. Caicedo 18'
Penalties
Blanco (penalty scored); Vargas (penalty scored); Soteldo (penalty scored)	3–0	(penalty missed) Oyola; (penalty missed) Velasco; (penalty missed) Esterilla

Estadio Agustín Tovar, Barinas
Referee: Mauro Vigliano (Argentina)

Tied 2–2 on aggregate, Zamora won on penalties and advanced to the second stage (Match O11).

=== Match G14 ===
10 August 2016
21:30 UTC−5

Independiente Medellín (Colombia)	1–1	(Ecuador) Universidad Católica
Castro 20'	Report	Lucas 77'

Estadio Atanasio Girardot, Medellín
Referee: Víctor Carrillo (Peru)

17 August 2016
16:30 UTC−5

Universidad Católica (Ecuador)	0–1	(Colombia) Independiente Medellín
	Report	L. Arias 40'

Estadio Olímpico Atahualpa, Quito
Referee: Darío Herrera (Argentina)

Independiente Medellín won 2–1 on aggregate and advanced to the second stage (Match O16).

=== Match G15 ===
11 August 2016
17:30 UTC−4

Deportivo Anzoátegui (Venezuela)	2–1	(Peru) Sport Huancayo
Centeno 34'; Cumaná 83'	Report	Martínez 8'

Estadio José Antonio Anzoátegui, Barcelona
Referee: Luis Yrusta (Bolivia)

18 August 2016
15:00 UTC−5

Sport Huancayo (Peru)	1–0	(Venezuela) Deportivo Anzoátegui
Corrales 58'	Report

Estadio Huancayo, Huancayo
Referee: Anderson Daronco (Brazil)

Tied 2–2 on aggregate, Sport Huancayo won on away goals and advanced to the second stage (Match O13).

=== Match G16 ===
11 August 2016
21:00 UTC−5

Deportivo Municipal (Peru)	0–5	(Colombia) Atlético Nacional
	Report	Uribe 29'; D. Arias 58'; Berrío 65'; Bernal 76'; Miller 88'

Estadio Alejandro Villanueva, Lima
Referee: Mario Díaz de Vivar (Paraguay)

17 August 2016
21:15 UTC−5

Atlético Nacional (Colombia)	1–0	(Peru) Deportivo Municipal
Bernal 42'	Report

Estadio Atanasio Girardot, Medellín
Referee: Juan Albarracín (Ecuador)

Atlético Nacional won 6–0 on aggregate and advanced to the second stage (Match O4).

== Second stage ==
The first legs were played on 23–25 August, and the second legs were played on 31 August and 13–15 September 2016.

Team 1	Agg.	Team 2	1st leg	2nd leg
Santa Cruz (Brazil)	1–0	(Brazil) Sport Recife	0–0	1–0
Deportivo La Guaira (Venezuela)	4–2	(Ecuador) Emelec	4–2	0–0
Cuiabá (Brazil)	2–3	(Brazil) Chapecoense	1–0	1–3
Bolívar (Bolivia)	1–2	(Colombia) Atlético Nacional	1–1	0–1
Estudiantes (Argentina)	1–2	(Argentina) Belgrano	1–0	0–2
Blooming (Bolivia)	1–3	(Colombia) Junior	0–2	1–1
Figueirense (Brazil)	5–5 (a)	(Brazil) Flamengo	4–2	1–3
Cerro Porteño (Paraguay)	7–0	(Bolivia) Real Potosí	6–0	1–0
Real Garcilaso (Peru)	2–3	(Chile) Palestino	2–2	0–1
Zamora (Venezuela)	0–2	(Uruguay) Montevideo Wanderers	0–1	0–1
Vitória (Brazil)	2–2 (a)	(Brazil) Coritiba	2–1	0–1
Sol de América (Paraguay)	2–1	(Peru) Sport Huancayo	1–0	1–1
Lanús (Argentina)	0–3	(Argentina) Independiente	0–2	0–1
Banfield (Argentina)	3–4	(Argentina) San Lorenzo	2–0	1–4
Independiente Medellín (Colombia)	3–2	(Paraguay) Sportivo Luqueño	3–0	0–2

=== Match O1 ===
24 August 2016
21:45 UTC−3

Santa Cruz (Brazil)	0–0	(Brazil) Sport Recife
	Report

Arena Pernambuco, São Lourenço da Mata
Referee: Julio Bascuñán (Chile)

31 August 2016
21:45 UTC−3

Sport Recife (Brazil)	0–1	(Brazil) Santa Cruz
	Report	Bruno Moraes 81'

Arena Pernambuco, São Lourenço da Mata
Referee: Diego Haro (Peru)

Santa Cruz won 1–0 on aggregate and advanced to the round of 16 (Match A).

=== Match O2 ===
23 August 2016
18:15 UTC−4

Deportivo La Guaira (Venezuela)	4–2	(Ecuador) Emelec
Flores 27'; D. González 37', 48'; Arrieta 70'	Report	Gaibor 52'; Herrera 67' (pen.)

Estadio Metropolitano de Lara, Barquisimeto
Referee: Roberto Tobar (Chile)

14 September 2016
16:00 UTC−5

Emelec (Ecuador)	0–0	(Venezuela) Deportivo La Guaira
	Report

Estadio George Capwell, Guayaquil
Referee: Wilmar Roldán (Colombia)

Deportivo La Guaira won 4–2 on aggregate and advanced to the round of 16 (Match B).

=== Match O3 ===
25 August 2016
18:00 UTC−4

Cuiabá (Brazil)	1–0	(Brazil) Chapecoense
Dakson 19'	Report

Arena Pantanal, Cuiabá
Referee: Jorge Baliño (Argentina)

31 August 2016
21:45 UTC−3

Chapecoense (Brazil)	3–1	(Brazil) Cuiabá
Lucas Gomes 67'; Bruno Rangel 70', 82'	Report	Douglas Mendes 22'

Arena Condá, Chapecó
Referee: Jesús Valenzuela (Venezuela)

Chapecoense won 3–2 on aggregate and advanced to the round of 16 (Match C).

=== Match O4 ===
24 August 2016
18:15 UTC−4

Bolívar (Bolivia)	1–1	(Colombia) Atlético Nacional
Arce 55'	Report	Borja 69'

Estadio Hernando Siles, La Paz
Referee: Enrique Cáceres (Paraguay)

13 September 2016
19:45 UTC−5

Atlético Nacional (Colombia)	1–0	(Bolivia) Bolívar
Borja 60'	Report

Estadio Atanasio Girardot, Medellín
Referee: Roddy Zambrano (Ecuador)

Atlético Nacional won 2–1 on aggregate and advanced to the round of 16 (Match D).

=== Match O5 ===
24 August 2016
21:45 UTC−3

Estudiantes (Argentina)	1–0	(Argentina) Belgrano
F. Sánchez 16'	Report

Estadio Ciudad de La Plata, La Plata
Referee: Julio Quintana (Paraguay)

15 September 2016
21:45 UTC−3

Belgrano (Argentina)	2–0	(Argentina) Estudiantes
Bieler 66' (pen.), 68'	Report

Estadio Mario Alberto Kempes, Córdoba
Referee: Víctor Carrillo (Peru)

Belgrano won 2–1 on aggregate and advanced to the round of 16 (Match E).

=== Match O6 ===
23 August 2016
20:45 UTC−4

Blooming (Bolivia)	0–2	(Colombia) Junior
	Report	Ovelar 22'; Toloza 51'

Estadio Ramón Tahuichi Aguilera, Santa Cruz de la Sierra
Referee: Jonhatan Fuentes (Uruguay)

14 September 2016
19:45 UTC−5

Junior (Colombia)	1–1	(Bolivia) Blooming
Y. González 19'	Report	João Paulo 58' (pen.)

Estadio Metropolitano Roberto Meléndez, Barranquilla
Referee: Raphael Claus (Brazil)

Junior won 3–1 on aggregate and advanced to the round of 16 (Match F).

=== Match O7 ===
24 August 2016
21:45 UTC−3

Figueirense (Brazil)	4–2	(Brazil) Flamengo
Rafael Moura 9', 26', 48'; Marquinhos 17'	Report	Alan Patrick 12'; Marcelo Cirino 75'

Estádio Orlando Scarpelli, Florianópolis
Referee: Daniel Fedorczuk (Uruguay)

31 August 2016
21:45 UTC−3

Flamengo (Brazil)	3–1	(Brazil) Figueirense
Éverton 13'; Jorge 25'; Fernandinho 71'	Report	Rafael Silva 5'

Estádio Kléber Andrade, Cariacica
Referee: Wilson Lamouroux (Colombia)

Tied 5–5 on aggregate, Flamengo won on away goals and advanced to the round of 16 (Match G).

=== Match O8 ===
24 August 2016
18:15 UTC−4

Cerro Porteño (Paraguay)	6–0	(Bolivia) Real Potosí
R. Rojas 13', 71'; Pereira 30'; Beltrán 37', 44', 52'	Report

Estadio Defensores del Chaco, Asunción
Referee: Diego Haro (Peru)

15 September 2016
18:30 UTC−4

Real Potosí (Bolivia)	0–1	(Paraguay) Cerro Porteño
	Report	R. Rojas 86'

Estadio Víctor Agustín Ugarte, Potosí
Referee: Óscar Rojas (Uruguay)

Cerro Porteño won 7–0 on aggregate and advanced to the round of 16 (Match H).

=== Match O10 ===
24 August 2016
15:00 UTC−5

Real Garcilaso (Peru)	2–2	(Chile) Palestino
Valverde 27' (pen.); Santillán 84'	Report	Vidal 7'; Valencia 12' (pen.)

Estadio Inca Garcilaso de la Vega, Cusco
Referee: Raúl Orosco (Bolivia)

15 September 2016
19:15 UTC−3

Palestino (Chile)	1–0	(Peru) Real Garcilaso
Benegas 49'	Report

Estadio Monumental David Arellano, Santiago
Referee: Mario Díaz de Vivar (Paraguay)

Palestino won 3–2 on aggregate and advanced to the round of 16 (Match G).

=== Match O11 ===
25 August 2016
20:45 UTC−4

Zamora (Venezuela)	0–1	(Uruguay) Montevideo Wanderers
	Report	Santos 57'

Estadio Agustín Tovar, Barinas
Referee: Leandro Vuaden (Brazil)

14 September 2016 (Note: The Montevideo Wanderers v Zamora match was scheduled on 13 September 2016, 19:15 UTC−3, but was postponed due to adverse weather conditions.)
16:00 UTC−3

Montevideo Wanderers (Uruguay)	1–0	(Venezuela) Zamora
Santos 88'	Report

Estadio Luis Franzini, Montevideo
Referee: Darío Herrera (Argentina)

Montevideo Wanderers won 2–0 on aggregate and advanced to the round of 16 (Match F).

=== Match O12 ===
25 August 2016
21:45 UTC−3

Vitória (Brazil)	2–1	(Brazil) Coritiba
Diego Renan 65' (pen.); Kieza 69'	Report	Evandro 43'

Arena Fonte Nova, Salvador
Referee: José Argote (Venezuela)

31 August 2016
17:00 UTC−3

Coritiba (Brazil)	1–0	(Brazil) Vitória
Iago 80'	Report

Estádio Couto Pereira, Curitiba
Referee: Carlos Orbe (Ecuador)

Tied 2–2 on aggregate, Coritiba won on away goals and advanced to the round of 16 (Match E).

=== Match O13 ===
25 August 2016
20:45 UTC−4

Sol de América (Paraguay)	1–0	(Peru) Sport Huancayo
Samaniego 7'	Report

Estadio Luis Alfonso Giagni, Asunción
Referee: Germán Delfino (Argentina)

15 September 2016
14:15 UTC−5

Sport Huancayo (Peru)	1–1	(Paraguay) Sol de América
Salcedo 5'	Report	E. Álvarez 79'

Estadio Huancayo, Huancayo
Referee: Néstor Pitana (Argentina)

Sol de América won 2–1 on aggregate and advanced to the round of 16 (Match D).

=== Match O14 ===
25 August 2016
19:15 UTC−3

Lanús (Argentina)	0–2	(Argentina) Independiente
	Report	Fernández 54'; Rigoni 88'

Estadio Ciudad de Lanús, Lanús
Referee: Wilmar Roldán (Colombia)

14 September 2016
19:15 UTC−3

Independiente (Argentina)	1–0	(Argentina) Lanús
Benítez 40'	Report

Estadio Libertadores de América, Avellaneda
Referee: Enrique Cáceres (Paraguay)

Independiente won 3–0 on aggregate and advanced to the round of 16 (Match C).

=== Match O15 ===
23 August 2016
19:15 UTC−3

Banfield (Argentina)	2–0	(Argentina) San Lorenzo
Rodríguez 4'; Sarmiento 36'	Report

Estadio Florencio Sola, Banfield
Referee: Luiz Flávio de Oliveira (Brazil)

13 September 2016
19:15 UTC−3

San Lorenzo (Argentina)	4–1	(Argentina) Banfield
Caruzzo 3'; Blandi 5', 10'; Cauteruccio 37'	Report	Soto 24'

Estadio Pedro Bidegain, Buenos Aires
Referee: Wilton Pereira Sampaio (Brazil)

San Lorenzo won 4–3 on aggregate and advanced to the round of 16 (Match B).

=== Match O16 ===
24 August 2016
19:45 UTC−5

Independiente Medellín (Colombia)	3–0	(Paraguay) Sportivo Luqueño
Hernández 24'; J. Caicedo 75'; L. Arias 90'	Report

Estadio Atanasio Girardot, Medellín
Referee: Roddy Zambrano (Ecuador)

15 September 2016
20:45 UTC−4

Sportivo Luqueño (Paraguay)	2–0	(Colombia) Independiente Medellín
Marín 23' (pen.); Alegre 44'	Report

Estadio Feliciano Cáceres, Luque
Referee: Roberto Tobar (Chile)

Independiente Medellín won 3–2 on aggregate and advanced to the round of 16 (Match A).
