= Misael Llantén =

Chilean footballer

Personal information
- Full name: Misael Benjamín Llantén Letelier
- Date of birth: 7 February 1999 (age 27)
- Place of birth: Santiago, Chile
- Height: 1.76 m (5 ft 9 in)
- Position: Midfielder

Team information
- Current team: Deportes Limache
- Number: 25

Youth career
- Colo-Colo

Senior career*
Years	Team	Apps	(Gls)
2016–2021	Colo-Colo	1	(0)
2019	→ San Antonio Unido (loan)	21	(1)
2020–2021	→ San Luis (loan)	23	(0)
2021	San Marcos	22	(2)
2022–2023	Lautaro de Buin	35	(3)
2024	Barnechea	26	(2)
2025–	Deportes Limache	20	(1)
- * Club domestic league appearances and goals as of 4 September 2025

Misael Benjamín Llantén Letelier (born 7 February 1999) is a Chilean footballer who plays as a midfielder for Deportes Limache in the Chilean Primera División.

== Club career ==
Born in Santiago de Chile, Llantén is a product of Colo-Colo. He made his professional debut in the 2016 Torneo Apertura. Later, he was loaned out to San Antonio Unido and San Luis de Quillota in 2019 and 2020, respectively.

Ended his contract with Colo-Colo at the end of the 2020 season, Llantén played for San Marcos de Arica, Lautaro de Buin and Barnechea.

In January 2025, Llantén joined Deportes Limache in the Chilean Primera División.
