= Vicente Álvarez (footballer, born 2006) =

Chilean footballer

Personal information
- Full name: Vicente Francisco Álvarez Ulloa
- Date of birth: 14 December 2006 (age 19)
- Place of birth: San Felipe, Chile
- Height: 1.75 m (5 ft 9 in)
- Position: Forward

Team information
- Current team: Deportes Limache (on loan from Unión San Felipe)
- Number: 15

Youth career
- Unión San Felipe

Senior career*
Years	Team	Apps	(Gls)
2024–	Unión San Felipe	37	(2)
2026–	→ Deportes Limache (loan)	8	(2)

International career^{‡}
2025	Chile U20	5	(0)
- * Club domestic league appearances and goals as of 15 April 2026 ‡ National team caps and goals as of 15 April 2026

Vicente Francisco Álvarez Ulloa (born 14 December 2006) is a Chilean footballer who plays as a forward for Deportes Limache on loan from Unión San Felipe in the Chilean Primera División.

== Club career ==
Born in San Felipe, Chile, Álvarez is a product of local club, Unión San Felipe. He was promoted to the first team and made his professional debut in the 2024 season.

In January 2026, Álvarez signed his first professional contract and was loaned out to Deportes Limache in the Chilean Primera División.

== International career ==
Álvarez represented the Chile U20 national team in the 2–1 home victory against New Zealand on 7 June 2025. Later, he represented them in the 2025 FIFA World Cup.
