= Flavio Moya =

Chilean footballer (born 2005)

Personal information
- Full name: Flavio Martín Moya Ortega
- Date of birth: 30 December 2005 (age 20)
- Place of birth: Puente Alto, Santiago, Chile
- Height: 1.75 m (5 ft 9 in)
- Position: Midfielder

Team information
- Current team: Deportes Limache (on loan from Universidad de Chile)

Youth career
- Universidad de Chile

Senior career*
| Years | Team | Apps | (Gls) |
| 2024– | Universidad de Chile | 9 | (0) |
| 2024 | → Ñublense (loan) | 19 | (3) |
| 2026– | → Deportes Limache (loan) | 0 | (0) |

International career^{‡}
| 2025 | Chile U20 | 4 | (0) |
- * Club domestic league appearances and goals as of 13 January 2026 ‡ National team caps and goals as of 9 October 2025

Flavio Martín Moya Ortega (born 30 December 2005) is a Chilean footballer who plays as a midfielder for Deportes Limache on loan from Universidad de Chile in the Chilean Primera División.

== Club career ==
Born in Puente Alto commune, Santiago de Chile, Moya is a product of Universidad de Chile. In 2024, Moya was loaned out to Ñublense in the Chilean top division. A regular player during the season, he reached 25 official matches in total and returned to Universidad de Chile for the 2025 season.

Moya made his debut with Universidad de Chile scoring a goal in the 1–3 away win against Magallanes on 5 April 2025 for the Copa Chile. Later, he also made appearances in the 2025 Copa Libertadores and the 2025 Copa Sudamericana.

In January 2026, Moya was loaned out to Deportes Limache.

== International career ==
Since 2024, Moya has been called up to the Chile U20 national team and has taken part in friendlies. He was withdrawn from the squad for the 2025 South American Championship due to injury, but he was called up to the preliminary squad for the 2025 FIFA U20 World Cup.
