= Matías Bórquez =

Chilean footballer

Personal information
- Full name: Matías Ignacio Bórquez Lizana
- Date of birth: 19 August 1998 (age 28)
- Place of birth: Santiago, Chile
- Height: 1.82 m (6 ft 0 in)
- Position: Goalkeeper

Team information
- Current team: Deportes Limache
- Number: 1

Youth career
- Palestino

Senior career*
Years	Team	Apps	(Gls)
2017–2020	Palestino	0	(0)
2020–2021	Deportes Recoleta	2	(0)
2021	Municipal Santiago	–	(–)
2022	San Antonio Unido	16	(0)
2023	Deportes Limache	9	(0)
2023	Los Rezagados (seven-a-side)	11	(16)
2024–	Deportes Limache	34	(0)
- * Club domestic league appearances and goals as of 28 October 2025

Matías Ignacio Bórquez Lizana (born 19 August 1998) is a Chilean footballer who plays as a goalkeeper for Deportes Limache in the Chilean Primera División.

== Club career ==
Born in Santiago de Chile, Bórquez was trained at Palestino and was a first team member from 2017 to 2019.

On 10 March 2020, Bórquez joined Deportes Recoleta. In the second half of 2021, he switched to Municipal Santiago. In 2022, he played for San Antonio Unido.

In 2023, Bórquez joined Deportes Limache, winning the Segunda División Profesional and getting the promotion to the 2024 Primera B. In the second half of the same year, he played for the seven-a-side football club Los Rezagados as a forward.

In 2024, Bórquez rejoined Deportes Limache, getting the promotion to the Chilean Primera División, the first time for the club. He continued with them in the Chilean top level.
