= Axel Alfonzo =

Paraguayan footballer

Personal information
- Full name: Axel Jonatan Alfonzo Villarreal
- Date of birth: 7 May 2004 (age 22)
- Place of birth: Paraguay
- Height: 1.80 m (5 ft 11 in)
- Position: Centre-back

Team information
- Current team: Deportes Limache (on loan from Olimpia)
- Number: 5

Youth career
- Olimpia

Senior career*
Years	Team	Apps	(Gls)
2022–	Olimpia	18	(1)
2026–	→ Deportes Limache (loan)	1	(0)

International career
2023	Paraguay U20	5	(0)
- * Club domestic league appearances and goals as of 1 February 2026

Axel Jonatan Alfonzo Villarreal (born 7 May 2004) is a Paraguayan footballer who plays as a centre-back for Chilean club Deportes Limache on loan from Olimpia.

== Club career ==
A product of Paraguayan giant Olimpia, Alfonzo made his professional debut in the 1–4 away win against Tacuary on 15 May 2022 for the Torneo Apertura. In 2024, he represented the under 20's at the U20 Copa Libertadores. He scored his first goal in the 2–2 away draw against Libertad on 1 November 2025 for the Torneo Clausura.

In January 2026, Alfonzo was loaned out to Chilean Primera División club Deportes Limache on a deal for a year with an option to buy.

== International career ==
Alfonzo represented Paraguay U20 at the 2023 South American Championship.
