= Claudio González (Chilean footballer) =

Chilean footballer (born 1990)

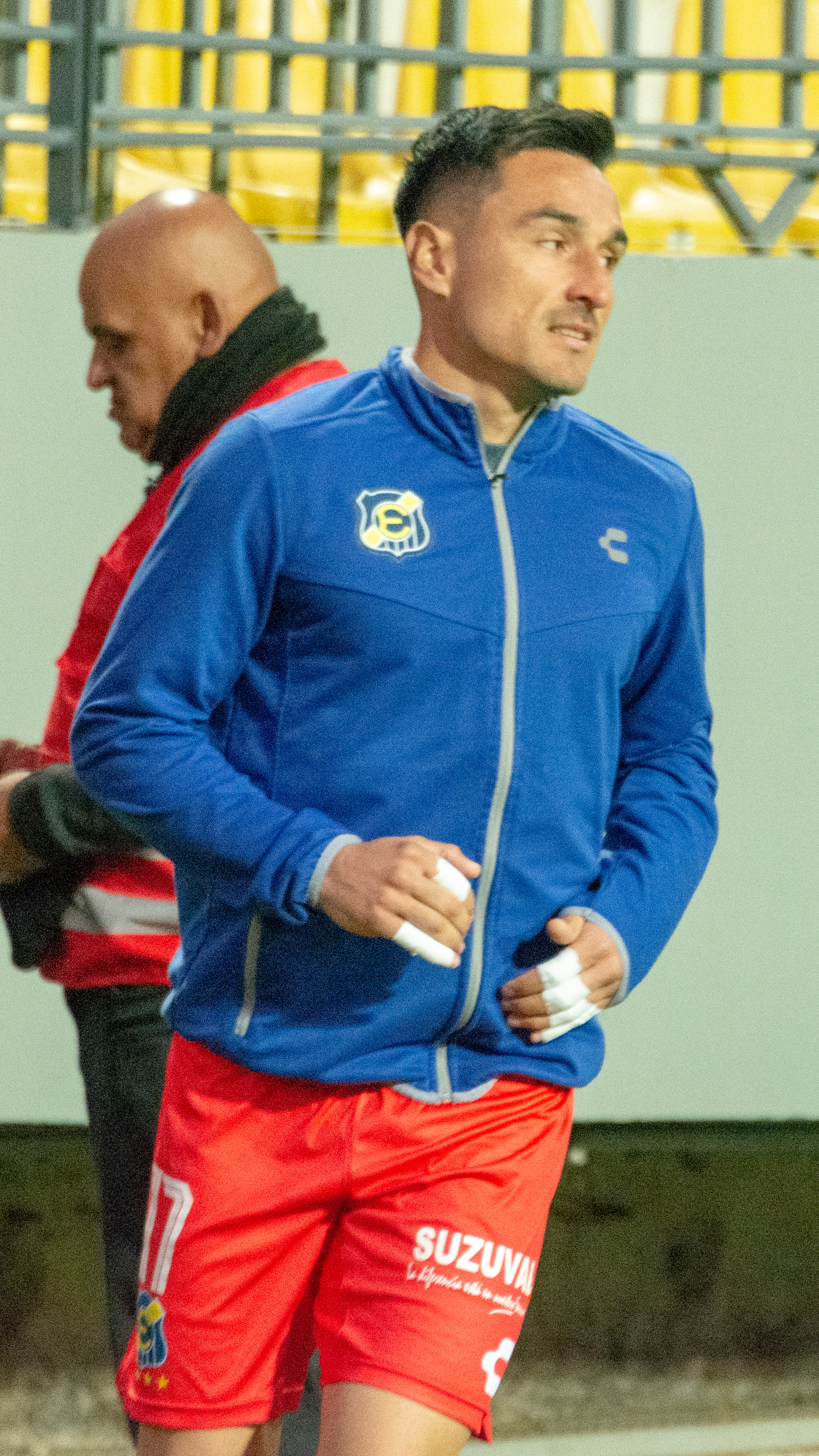
- González with Everton in 2023

Personal information
- Full name: Claudio Iván González Landeros
- Date of birth: 26 April 1990 (age 36)
- Place of birth: Curicó, Chile
- Height: 1.76 m (5 ft 9 in)
- Position: Goalkeeper

Team information
- Current team: Deportes Limache

Youth career
- Universidad de Chile

Senior career*
Years	Team	Apps	(Gls)
2009–2010	Curicó Unido	0	(0)
2011–2012	Deportes Linares	–	(–)
2013	San Antonio Unido	20	(0)
2013–2015	Unión San Felipe	50	(0)
2015–2016	Everton	31	(0)
2016–2017	Deportes Copiapó	17	(0)
2017–2018	Unión La Calera	19	(0)
2019	Cobreloa	25	(0)
2020–2021	Deportes Puerto Montt	36	(0)
2022	Deportes Temuco	8	(0)
2022	Unión La Calera	1	(0)
2023–2025	Everton	5	(0)
2026–	Deportes Limache	0	(0)
- * Club domestic league appearances and goals as of 30 December 2025

Claudio Iván González Landeros (born 26 April 1990) is a Chilean footballer who plays as a goalkeeper for Chilean Primera División side Deportes Limache.

== Career ==
On 30 December 2025, González joined Deportes Limache from Everton de Viña del Mar.

== Honours ==
Deportes Linares

- Tercera B: 2011

Unión La Calera

- Primera B: 2017 Transición
