= Carlos Morales (footballer, born 2000) =

Chilean footballer

Personal information
- Full name: Carlos Jeremy Morales Gatica
- Date of birth: 21 July 2000 (age 26)
- Place of birth: La Pintana, Santiago, Chile
- Height: 1.67 m (5 ft 6 in)
- Position: Right-back

Team information
- Current team: Deportes Limache
- Number: 7

Youth career
- Universidad Católica

Senior career*
Years	Team	Apps	(Gls)
2019	Universidad Católica	0	(0)
2019	→ General Velásquez (loan)	20	(0)
2020–2021	Deportes Copiapó	0	(0)
2021	Rodelindo Román	20	(0)
2022	Colchagua	–	(–)
2023	Iberia	25	(2)
2024–	Deportes Limache	39	(0)
2025	→ Deportes Concepción (loan)	19	(0)
- * Club domestic league appearances and goals as of 30 April 2026

Carlos Jeremy Morales Gatica (born 21 July 2000) is a Chilean footballer who plays as a right-back for Deportes Limache in the Chilean Primera División.

== Club career ==
Morales is a product of Universidad Católica. In 2019, he was loaned out to General Velásquez.

Ended his contract with Universidad Católica, Morales spent seasons with Deportes Copiapó (2020), Rodelindo Román (2021), Colchagua (2022) and Iberia (2023).

In 2024, Morales joined Deportes Limache and helped them to get promotion to the Chilean Primera División. He continued with them in 2025, but he was loaned out to Deportes Concepción for the second half of the year, getting another promotion to the Chilean top division. He moved back to Deportes Limache for the 2026 Liga de Primera.
