= Deportes Limache =

Chilean football club

- Full name: Club de Deportes Limache
- Nicknames: Tomate Mecánico (Mechanical Tomato); Cerveceros (Brewers)
- Founded: 1 November 2012; 13 years ago
- Ground: Estadio Gustavo Ocaranza
- Capacity: 3,000
- Manager: Víctor Rivero
- League: Liga de Primera
- 2025: Liga de Primera, 11th of 16
Home colours	Away colours

Club de Deportes Limache is a Chilean professional association football club based in Limache, Valparaíso Region. Founded in 2012, the club currently competes in the Primera División, the top tier of the Chilean football league system.

Limache entered the Tercera División B in 2013 and won the competition in its first season. It later won the Tercera División A in 2020 and the Segunda División Profesional in 2023, reaching Primera B for the first time.

In its debut season in Primera B, Limache won the 2024 promotion play-offs and earned promotion to the Primera División for the first time. During its first top-flight season, the club also reached the 2025 Copa Chile final, finishing runner-up to Huachipato after a penalty shoot-out.

== History ==
=== Foundation ===
Deportes Limache was founded in 2012 following the disappearance of Municipal Limache, which had previously represented the city in Chilean football. The new institution was established to restore a representative team for Limache and was admitted to the Tercera División B for the 2013 season.

In its first competitive season, Limache advanced to the final stage of the 2013 Tercera División B. On the final matchday, a 1–1 draw with Deportivo Estación Central was sufficient for the club to win the championship and secure promotion to the Tercera División A.

=== Rising ===
Limache competed in the Tercera División A from 2014. The club gradually moved into contention for promotion and, in 2019, reached a decisive match against Deportes Concepción for a place in the Segunda División Profesional. Limache lost 3–2 at the Estadio Ester Roa Rebolledo and remained in the amateur divisions.

The club achieved promotion the following season. In the 2020 Tercera División A, which concluded in early 2021 because of calendar disruptions, Limache advanced through the promotion phase after overcoming Provincial Ranco and Real San Joaquín. It then faced Rodelindo Román in the championship match on 6 February 2021. After a goalless draw, Limache won the penalty shoot-out 5–3 to claim the Tercera División A title. Both finalists were promoted to the Segunda División Profesional.

Limache entered professional football in the Segunda División Profesional in 2021. The club finished third in its first season and ninth in 2022 before competing for the title in 2023.

Under coach Víctor Rivero, Limache led the 2023 Segunda División for much of the season. On 8 September, a 3–0 away victory over Real San Joaquín gave the club an unassailable lead with several rounds remaining, securing both the championship and its first promotion to Primera B. Limache completed the campaign with 18 victories and only one defeat.

Limache made its Primera B debut in 2024. The club spent part of the season among the leading positions before finishing seventh, which qualified it for the promotion play-offs.

In the play-offs, Limache eliminated Deportes Antofagasta and then Magallanes to reach the final against Rangers. Limache won the first leg 3–1 at the Estadio Nicolás Chahuán Nazar.

Rangers won the return match 3–1 after extra time at the Estadio Fiscal de Talca, leaving the tie level at 4–4 on aggregate. Limache then won the penalty shoot-out 4–3 to secure promotion to the Primera División for the first time in its history. The achievement came in the club's first season in Primera B and twelve years after its foundation.

=== Top tier and Copa Chile final ===
Limache made its Primera División debut in 2025. Its first victory in the top flight came on 15 April, when it defeated Deportes Iquique 2–0. The club subsequently retained its place in the division for the 2026 season.

The same season, Limache reached the 2025 Copa Chile final for the first time. In the knockout rounds, the club eliminated Cobreloa, Coquimbo Unido and Deportes La Serena, defeating the latter 8–1 on aggregate in the semi-finals. Limache faced Huachipato in the final at the Estadio El Teniente in Rancagua. The match finished 1–1, with Limache taking the lead through Facundo Pons before Huachipato equalised in stoppage time. Huachipato won the subsequent penalty shoot-out 4–3, leaving Limache as Copa Chile runner-up.

== Current squad ==
Current squad of Deportes Limache as of 10 September 2026 (edit)

No.		Position	Player
1	CHI	GK	Matías Bórquez
2	ARG	DF	Augusto Aguirre
3	CHI	DF	Benjamín Molina (loan from O'Higgins)
4	CHI	DF	Marcelo Flores
5	PAR	DF	Axel Alfonzo (loan from Olimpia)
6	CHI	MF	César Fuentes
7	CHI	DF	Carlos Morales
9	ARG	FW	Gonzalo Sosa
10	CHI	MF	Leonardo Valencia
11	CHI	DF	Javier Rojas (loan from Colo-Colo)
12	CHI	GK	Mártin Smith
14	PAR	MF	Hugo Martínez
15	CHI	FW	Vicente Álvarez (loan from Unión San Felipe)
16	CHI	FW	Jean Meneses
17	CHI	GK	Claudio González
18	ARG	FW	Gonzalo Abán

No.		Position	Player
19	CHI	FW	Daniel Castro
21	CHI	MF	Flavio Moya (loan from Universidad de Chile)
23	BRA	GK	César Dutra (loan from Deportes Concepción)
24	CHI	DF	Alfonso Parot (c)
25	CHI	MF	Misael Llantén
26	ARG	FW	Marcos Arturia
27	URU	MF	Tiago Galletto
28	CHI	MF	Vicente Vargas
29	CHI	FW	Franco Oyarzún
30	CHI	FW	Giovanni Hernández
31	CHI	FW	Darío Martínez
32	CHI	MF	Vicente Cárcamo (loan from Universidad Católica)
33	CHI	DF	Dylan Escobar (loan from Coquimbo Unido)
–	CHI	DF	Yerko González
–	PAR	MF	Ramón Martínez

Manager: Víctor Rivero

=== 2026 Winter transfers ===
==== In ====
Note: Flags indicate national team as defined under FIFA eligibility rules; some limited exceptions apply. Players may hold more than one non-FIFA nationality.

No.	Pos.	Nation	Player
10	MF	CHI	Leonardo Valencia (from Deportes Concepción)
11	DF	CHI	Javier Rojas (loan from Colo-Colo)
14	MF	PAR	Hugo Martínez (from Libertad)
27	MF	URU	Tiago Galletto (from AVS)

No.	Pos.	Nation	Player
32	MF	CHI	Vicente Cárcamo (loan from Universidad Católica)
33	DF	CHI	Dylan Escobar (loan from Coquimbo Unido)
—	GK	BRA	César Dutra (loan from Deportes Concepción)

==== Out ====
Note: Flags indicate national team as defined under FIFA eligibility rules; some limited exceptions apply. Players may hold more than one non-FIFA nationality.

No.	Pos.	Nation	Player
8	FW	CHI	Joaquín Montecinos (to Deportes Concepción)
10	MF	CHI	César Pinares (free)

No.	Pos.	Nation	Player
11	FW	ARG	Facundo Marín (to Ferrocarril Midland)
—	FW	CHI	Josué Ovalle (to Everton)

=== Notable players ===
- (Chile) Yonathan Andía (2017)

== Honours ==
Nationals
Competition	Champion	Runners-up
Tercera División A (1/0)	2020
Tercera División B (1/0)	2013-C
Copa Chile (0/1)		2025

== Kit manufacturers and shirt sponsors ==
Period	Brand	Sponsor
2013–14	JCQ	Bosch
2015–16	Training	La Económica
2016	Penalty
2017	JCQ	CVU
2018	Ocapa	CVU
2019	Claus7	Lada

== Managerial history ==
- (Chile) Mauricio Riffo (2013–2015)
- (Chile) Leonardo Vinés (2016)
- (Chile) Ruperto Rivas (2016)
- (Chile) Carlos Contreras (2016)
- (Chile) Jorge Guzmán (2017)
- (Chile) René Gatica (2017)
- (Argentina) Jeremías Viale (2018)
- (Chile) Erwin Durán (2018)
- (Chile) Jonathan Orellana (2019)
- (Chile) Ramón Climent (2019)
- (Chile) Ítalo Pinochet (2019–2021)
- (Chile) Mauricio Riffo (2022)
- (Chile) Marcelo Ramírez (2022)
- (Chile) Víctor Rivero (2023–)
