= Carlos Mireles Morales =

Mexican politician

- Born: 18 October 1937 (age 88); Sabinas Hidalgo, Nuevo León, Mexico
- Occupation: Politician
- Political party: PRI

Carlos Mireles Morales (born 18 October 1937) is a Mexican politician affiliated with the Institutional Revolutionary Party. As of 2014 he served as Deputy of the LIX Legislature of the Mexican Congress as a plurinominal representative.
