= Leonardo Valencia =

Chilean footballer (born 1991)

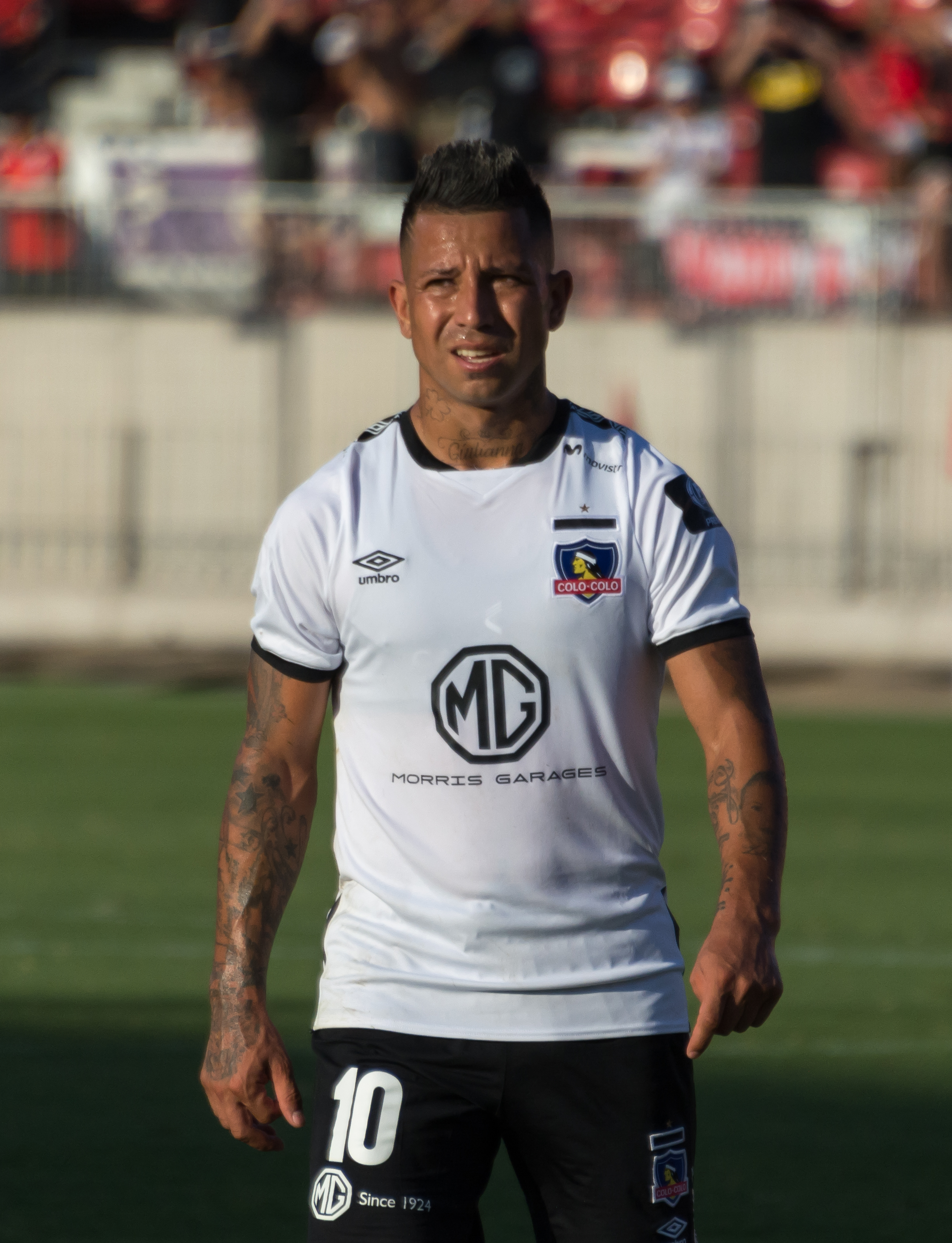
- Valencia with Colo-Colo in 2020

Personal information
- Full name: Leonardo Felipe Valencia Rossel
- Date of birth: 25 April 1991 (age 35)
- Place of birth: Santiago, Chile
- Height: 1.69 m (5 ft 6 1/2 in)
- Position: Midfielder

Team information
- Current team: Deportes Limache

Youth career
- Universidad de Chile

Senior career*
Years	Team	Apps	(Gls)
2008–2011	Universidad de Chile	0	(0)
2008	→ Deportes Melipilla (loan)	1	(0)
2011	→ Unión La Calera (loan)	1	(0)
2012	Unión La Calera	34	(1)
2013–2017	Palestino	80	(23)
2014	→ Santiago Wanderers (loan)	16	(5)
2015–2016	→ Universidad de Chile (loan)	16	(4)
2017–2019	Botafogo	61	(4)
2020–2022	Colo-Colo	31	(6)
2021–2022	→ Deportes La Serena (loan)	30	(11)
2023–2024	Cobresal	51	(15)
2025	Audax Italiano	26	(15)
2026	Deportes Concepción	18	(1)
2026–	Deportes Limache	0	(0)

International career^{‡}
2016–	Chile	9	(1)
Medal record
Representing Chile
Runner-up	FIFA Confederations Cup	2017
- * Club domestic league appearances and goals as of 15 July 2026 ‡ National team caps and goals as of 2 July 2017

Leonardo Felipe Valencia Rossel (Latin American Spanish: [leoˈnaɾðo βaˈlensja]; born 25 April 1991) is a Chilean professional footballer who plays as a midfielder for Deportes Limache.

== Career ==
=== Palestino ===
==== Universidad de Chile (loan) ====
On 9 July 2015 Valencia returned to Universidad de Chile, this time on a one-year loan deal until the end of the 2015–16 season.

=== Botafogo ===
On 11 July 2017 Valencia officially signed with Brazilian Série A club Botafogo a three-year contract.

=== Colo Colo ===
On 23 December 2019, it was announced that Valencia signed for Chilean club Colo Colo.

=== Audax Italiano ===
Valencia signed with Audax Italiano for the 2025 season.

=== Deportes Concepción ===
On 24 December 2025, Valencia agreed a deal with Deportes Concepción.

=== Deportes Limache ===
On 15 July 2026, Valencia signed with Deportes Limache on an unofficial swap for Joaquín Montecinos.

== International career ==
Valencia got his first call up to the senior Chile side for 2018 FIFA World Cup qualifiers against Ecuador and Peru in October 2016.

On 13 June 2017 Valencia scored his first international goal for Chile in a Friendly against Romania at Cluj Arena.

== Career statistics ==
=== Club ===
(Correct As of 4 December 2019.)

Club	Season	League			Cup		Continental		Other		Total	
Club	Season	Division	Apps	Goals	Apps	Goals	Apps	Goals	Apps	Goals	Apps	Goals
Unión La Calera(loan)	2011	Primera División	1	0	–		–		–		1	0
Unión La Calera	2012	Primera División	34	1	6	1	–		–		40	2
Unión La Calera	Total		35	1	6	1	0	0	0	0	41	2
Palestino	2013	Primera División	14	0	6	0	–		–		20	0
Palestino	2013–14	Primera División	7	1	–		–		–		7	1
Palestino	2014–15	Primera División	31	14	10	3	–		–		41	17
Palestino	2016–17	Primera División	28	8	3	0	10 (Note: Appearance(s) in Copa Sudamericana.)	0	–		41	8
Palestino	Total		80	23	19	3	10	0	0	0	109	26
Santiago Wanderers (loan)	2013–14	Primera División	16	5	–		–		–		16	5
Universidad de Chile (loan)	2015–16	Primera División	16	4	9	1	1 (Note: Appearance(s) in Copa Libertadores.)	0	1 (Note: Appearance(s) in Supercopa de Chile.)	0	27	5
Botafogo	2017	Série A	13	0	–		2	0	–		15	0
Botafogo	2018	Série A	27	3	0	0	5	1	17 (Note: Appearance(s) in Rio de Janeiro State League.)	1	49	5
Botafogo	2019	Série A	21	1	1	0	4	0	2 (Note: Appearance(s) in Campeonato Carioca.)	0	28	1
Botafogo	Total		61	4	1	0	11	0	19	1	92	6
Total			208	37	35	5	22	1	20	1	285	44

=== International ===
As of match played 12 November 2019.

Appearances and goals by national team and year
National team	Year	Apps	Goals
Chile	2016	2	0
Chile	2017	7	1
Total		9	1

=== International goals ===
Scores and results list Chile's goal tally first.

No	Date	Venue	Opponent	Score	Result	Competition
1.	13 June 2017	Cluj Arena, Cluj-Napoca, Romania	Romania	2–0	2–3	Friendly

== Honours ==
Universidad de Chile

- Copa Chile (1): 2015
- Supercopa de Chile (1): 2015

Botafogo

- Campeonato Carioca: 2018

Colo-Colo

- Copa Chile (1): 2019

Chile

- Confederations Cup (1): Runner-up 2017
- China Cup (1): 2017

== Notes ==
In isolation, Valencia is pronounced [baˈlensja]
